= 2014 Sport Club do Recife season =

Sport Recife
2014 season
- Chairman: João Humberto Martorelli
- Manager: Geninho; Eduardo Baptista; Pedro Gama (c)
- Stadium: Ilha do Retiro
- Série A: 11th
- Pernambucano: Champions (40th title)
- Copa do Brasil: Second round
- Copa do Nordeste: Champions (3rd title)
- Copa Sudamericana: First round
- Top goalscorer: League: Patric (7); All: Neto Baiano (18)
Home colours	Away colours

The 2014 season was Sport Recife's 110th season in the club's history. Sport competed in the Campeonato Pernambucano, Copa do Nordeste, Copa Sudamericana, Série A and Copa do Brasil.

== Squad ==
Note: Flags indicate national team as defined under FIFA eligibility rules; some limited exceptions apply. Players may hold more than one non-FIFA nationality.

No.	Pos.	Nation	Player
1	GK	BRA	Magrão
2	DF	BRA	Vítor
3	DF	BRA	Ewerton Páscoa
4	DF	BRA	Durval (captain)
5	MF	BRA	Rodrigo Mancha
6	DF	BRA	Renê
8	MF	BRA	Aílton
10	MF	BRA	Régis
11	FW	BRA	Felipe Azevedo
12	DF	BRA	Patric
14	DF	BRA	Danilo
15	MF	BRA	Willian
16	DF	BRA	Igor
17	MF	BRA	Wendel

No.	Pos.	Nation	Player
18	FW	BRA	Érico Júnior
20	FW	BRA	Mike
21	MF	BRA	Rithely
22	DF	BRA	Oswaldo
25	MF	BRA	Neto
26	GK	BRA	Flávio
29	MF	BRA	Ronaldo
30	GK	BRA	Lucas
32	MF	BRA	Anderson Pedra
34	FW	BRA	Joelinton
39	MF	BRA	Welton
40	GK	BRA	Saulo
44	DF	BRA	Henrique Mattos
87	MF	BRA	Diego Souza

== Statistics ==
=== Overall ===
Games played	69 (14 Pernambucano, 12 Copa do Nordeste, 3 Copa do Brasil, 2 Copa Sudamericana, 38 Série A)
Games won	30 (8 Pernambucano, 6 Copa do Nordeste, 2 Copa do Brasil, 0 Copa Sudamericana, 14 Série A)
Games drawn	15 (2 Pernambucano, 3 Copa do Nordeste, 0 Copa do Brasil, 0 Copa Sudamericana, 10 Série A)
Games lost	24 (4 Pernambucano, 3 Copa do Nordeste, 1 Copa do Brasil, 2 Copa Sudamericana, 14 Série A)
Goals scored	78
Goals conceded	70
Goal difference	+8
Best results (goal difference)	3–0 (A) v Náutico - Campeonato Pernambucano - 2014.02.02
Worst result (goal difference)	0–4 (A) v Fluminense - Série A - 2014.08.24
Top scorer	Diego Souza (17)

Source: Sport Recife official website

=== Goalscorers ===
Place	Pos.	Nat.	No.	Name	Campeonato Pernambucano	Copa do Nordeste	Copa do Brasil	Copa Sudamericana	Série A	Total
1	FW	(Brazil)	9	Neto Baiano	8	6	0	0	4	18
2	DF	(Brazil)	2	Patric	3	1	0	0	7	11
3	MF	(Brazil)	11	Felipe Azevedo	3	2	1	0	3	9
4	MF	(Brazil)	7	Ananias	0	1	3	0	2	6
5	DF	(Brazil)	14	Danilo Barcelos	0	1	1	0	3	5
6	FW	(Brazil)	87	Diego Souza	0	0	0	0	4	4
=	MF	(Brazil)	21	Rithely	0	1	0	1	2	4
7	DF	(Brazil)	3	Ewerton Páscoa	2	0	0	0	1	3
=	MF	(Brazil)	20	Mike	0	0	0	0	3	3
8	MF	(Brazil)	7	Augusto César	0	0	1	0	1	2
=	DF	(Brazil)	4	Durval	1	0	0	0	1	2
=	DF	(Brazil)	3	Ferron	1	1	0	0	0	2
=	FW	(Brazil)	9	Joelinton	0	0	0	0	2	2
=	FW	(Brazil)	19	Leonardo	1	0	1	0	0	2
=	MF	(Brazil)	5	Rodrigo Mancha	1	0	0	0	1	2
9	FW	(Brazil)	18	Érico Júnior	0	1	0	0	0	1
=	MF	(Brazil)	10	Régis	0	0	0	0	1	1
				Own goals	0	0	0	0	1	1
				Total	20	14	7	1	36	78

=== Managers performance ===
Name	From	To	P	W	D	L	GF	GA	Avg%	Ref
(Brazil) Geninho	19 January 2014	29 January 2014	4	0	2	2	1	3	16%	
(Brazil) Eduardo Baptista	2 February 2014	7 December 2014	64	30	13	21	76	65	53%	
(Brazil) Pedro Gama (c)	15 May 2014		1	0	0	1	1	2	0%	

(c) Indicates the caretaker manager

=== Home record ===
Recife	São Lourenço da Mata
Ilha do Retiro	Arena Pernambuco
Capacity: 32,983	Capacity: 44,300
27 matches (17 wins 4 draws 6 losses)	7 matches (3 wins 4 draws)

== Official Competitions ==
=== Campeonato Pernambucano ===
==== First stage ====
12 February 2014 2	Sport	4–0	Salgueiro	Recife
20:00 (UTC-3)	Neto Baiano 44', 82'; Ferron 59'; Felipe Azevedo 88'	Report		Stadium: Estádio Adelmar da Costa Carvalho (Ilha do Retiro); Attendance: 11,673; Referee: Emerson Sobral

19 February 2014 3	Porto	0–2	Sport	Caruaru
22:00 (UTC-3)		Report	Patric 22'; Neto Baiano 47'	Stadium: Estádio Luiz José de Lacerda (Lacerdão); Attendance: 8,384; Referee: Gilberto Castro Júnior

22 February 2014 4	Sport	1–1	Central	Recife
19:30 (UTC-3)	Neto Baiano 8'	Report	Jean Batista 50'	Stadium: Estádio Adelmar da Costa Carvalho (Ilha do Retiro); Attendance: 12,277; Referee: Luiz Cláudio Sobral

27 February 2014 1*	Náutico	2–1	Sport	São Lourenço da Mata
20:00 (UTC-3)	Pedro Carmona 9', 71'	Report	Ewerton Páscoa 48'	Stadium: Estádio Governador Carlos Wilson Campos (Arena Pernambuco); Referee: Gleydson Ferreira Leite

6 March 2014 5	Sport	3–0	Santa Cruz	Recife
20:30 (UTC-3)	Felipe Azevedo 5', 29'; Patric 16'	Report		Stadium: Estádio Adelmar da Costa Carvalho (Ilha do Retiro); Attendance: 18,033; Referee: Sandro Meira Ricci

9 March 2014 6	Central	0–2	Sport	Caruaru
(UTC-3)		Report	Neto Baiano 67'; Rodrigo Mancha 79'	Stadium: Estádio Luiz José de Lacerda (Lacerdão); Attendance: 8,058; Referee: Emerson Sobral

16 March 2014 7	Salgueiro	2–1	Sport	Salgueiro
16:00 (UTC-3)	Pio 31'; Aylton Alemão 47'	Report	Neto Baiano 89'	Stadium: Estádio Cornélio de Barros; Attendance: 7,546; Referee: Neilson Vieira Dos Santos

22 March 2014 8	Sport	1–0	Porto	Recife
19:30 (UTC-3)	Neto Baiano 43'	Report		Stadium: Estádio Adelmar da Costa Carvalho (Ilha do Retiro); Attendance: 11,017; Referee: Luiz Cláudio Sobral

26 March 2014 9	Santa Cruz	1–1	Sport	Recife
22:00 (UTC-3)	Léo Gamalho 39'	Report	Ewerton Páscoa 80'	Stadium: Estádio José do Rego Maciel (Arruda)

30 March 2014 10	Sport	0–1	Náutico	Recife
16:00 (UTC-3)		Report	Marcos Vinícius 73'	Stadium: Estádio Adelmar da Costa Carvalho (Ilha do Retiro); Attendance: 14,846; Referee: Emerson Sobral

==== Semi-finals ====
6 April 2014	Santa Cruz	3–0	Sport	Recife
16:00 (UTC-3)	Léo Gamalho 55', 86'; Renatinho 77'	Report		Stadium: Estádio José do Rego Maciel (Arruda); Attendance: 28,366; Referee: Gilberto Castro Júnior

13 April 2014	Sport	1–0 (5–3 p)	Santa Cruz	Recife
16:00 (UTC-3)	Leonardo 86'	Report		Stadium: Estádio Adelmar da Costa Carvalho (Ilha do Retiro); Attendance: 23,721; Referee: Sebastião Rufino Filho
	Penalties
	Leonardo (penalty scored); Renan Oliveira (penalty scored); Patric (penalty scored); Ewerton Páscoa (penalty scored); Neto Baiano (penalty scored)		(penalty scored) Léo Gamalho; (penalty scored) Renan Fonseca; (penalty scored) Sandro Manoel; (penalty missed) Carlos Alberto

==== Finals ====
16 April 2014	Sport	2–0	Náutico	Recife
22:00 (UTC-3)	Patric 64'; Neto Baiano 84'	Report		Stadium: Estádio Adelmar da Costa Carvalho (Ilha do Retiro); Attendance: 26,173; Referee: Wilton Sampaio

23 April 2014	Náutico	0–1	Sport	São Lourenço da Mata
22:00 (UTC-3)		Report	Durval 76'	Stadium: Estádio Governador Carlos Wilson Campos (Arena Pernambuco); Attendance: 30,061; Referee: Leandro Pedro Vuaden

==== Record ====
Final Position	Points	Matches	Wins	Draws	Losses	Goals For	Goals Away	Win%
1st	26	14	8	2	4	20	10	62%

=== Copa do Nordeste ===
==== Group stage ====
19 January 2014 1	Botafogo–PB	1–1	Sport	João Pessoa
17:00 (UTC-3)	Frontini 5'	Report	Felipe Azevedo 54'	Stadium: Estádio José Américo de Almeida Filho (Almeidão); Attendance: 5,694; Referee: Charles Hebert Cavalcante Ferreira

23 January 2014 2	Sport	0–1	Náutico	Recife
22:30 (UTC-3)		Report	Zé Mário 39'	Stadium: Estádio Adelmar da Costa Carvalho (Ilha do Retiro); Attendance: 15,044; Referee: Gilberto Rodrigues Castro Junior

26 January 2014 3	Sport	0–0	Guarany de Sobral	Recife
19:30 (UTC-3)		Report		Stadium: Estádio Adelmar da Costa Carvalho (Ilha do Retiro); Attendance: 9,762; Referee: Flávio Feijo de Omena

29 January 2014 4	Guarany de Sobral	1–0	Sport	Sobral
22:15 (UTC-3)	Gugu 90'	Report		Stadium: Estádio Municipal Plácido Aderaldo Castelo (Junco); Attendance: 5,523; Referee: Leandro Saraiva Dantas de Oliveira

2 February 2014 5	Náutico	0–3	Sport	São Lourenço da Mata
19:30 (UTC-3)		Report	Ananias 14'; Erico Junior 47'; Neto Baiano 87'	Stadium: Estádio Governador Carlos Wilson Campos (Arena Pernambuco); Attendance: 13,062; Referee: Emerson Luiz Sobral

6 February 2014 6	Sport	1–0	Botafogo–PB	Recife
21:30 (UTC-3)	Neto Baiano 60'	Report		Stadium: Estádio Adelmar da Costa Carvalho (Ilha do Retiro); Attendance: 17,413; Referee: Arilson Bispo da Anunciação

==== Quarter-finals ====
16 February 2014	Sport	2–0	CSA	Recife
16:00 (UTC-3)	Neto Baiano 29'; Ferron 65'	Report		Stadium: Estádio Adelmar da Costa Carvalho (Ilha do Retiro); Attendance: 0 Referee: Cláudio Francisco Lima e Silva

25 February 2014	CSA	1–0	Sport	Maceió
20:30 (UTC-3)	Daniel Costa 45+2'	Report		Stadium: Estádio Rei Pelé; Attendance: 9,021; Referee: Jaílson Macedo Freitas

==== Semi-finals ====
12 March 2014	Sport	2–0	Santa Cruz	Recife
22:00 (UTC-3)	Neto Baiano 21'; Felipe Azevedo 46'	Report		Stadium: Estádio Adelmar da Costa Carvalho (Ilha do Retiro); Attendance: 10,326; Referee: Gilberto Rodrigues Castro Junior

19 March 2014	Santa Cruz	1–2	Sport	Recife
22:00 (UTC-3)	Léo Gamalho 47'	Report	Rithely 44'; Patric 55'	Stadium: Estádio José do Rego Maciel (Arruda); Attendance: 15,501; Referee: Sandro Meira Ricci

==== Finals ====
2 April 2014	Sport	2–0	Ceará	Recife
22:00 (UTC-3)	Neto Baiano 11'; Danilo Barcelos 85'	Report		Stadium: Estádio Adelmar da Costa Carvalho (Ilha do Retiro); Attendance: 25,545; Referee: Cláudio Francisco Lima e Silva

9 April 2014	Ceará	1–1	Sport	Fortaleza
22:00 (UTC-3)	Magno Alves 42'	Report	Neto Baiano 51'	Stadium: Estádio Governador Plácido Castelo (Castelão); Attendance: 61,240; Referee: Jailson Macedo Freitas

==== Record ====
Final Position	Points	Matches	Wins	Draws	Losses	Goals For	Goals Away	Win%
1st	21	12	6	3	3	14	6	58%

=== Copa do Brasil ===
==== First round ====
1 May 2014	Brasília	1–3	Sport	Brasília
21:50 (UTC-3)	Kaká 80'	Report	Leonardo 34'; Augusto César 39'; Ananias 59'	Stadium: Estádio Nacional (Mané Garrincha); Attendance: 22,095; Referee: Jânio Pires Gonçalves

==== Second round ====
15 May 2014	Paysandu	2–1	Sport	Belém
19:30 (UTC-3)	Yago Pikachu 50'; Marcos Paraná 74'	Report	Felipe Azevedo 54'	Stadium: Estádio Estadual Jornalista Edgar Augusto Proença (Mangueirão); Attendance: 4,247; Referee: Rodrigo Batista Raposo

24 July 2014	Sport	3–2	Paysandu	Recife
19:30 (UTC-3)	Ananias 2', 40'; Danilo Barcelos 13'	Report	Oswaldo 17' (o.g.); Marcos Paraná 42'	Stadium: Estádio Adelmar da Costa Carvalho (Ilha do Retiro); Attendance: 844; Referee: Raphael Claus

==== Record ====
Final Position	Points	Matches	Wins	Draws	Losses	Goals For	Goals Away	Win%
31st	6	3	2	0	1	7	5	66%

=== Copa Sudamericana ===
28 August 2014	Sport (Brazil)	0–1	(Brazil) Vitória	Recife
22:00 (UTC-3)		Report	Beltrán 9'	Stadium: Estádio Adelmar da Costa Carvalho (Ilha do Retiro); Attendance: 8,320; Referee: Oscar Maldonado (Bolivia)

3 September 2014	Vitória (Brazil)	2–1	(Brazil) Sport	Salvador
22:00 (UTC-3)	Willie 21'; Marcinho 73'	Report	Rithely 50'	Stadium: Estádio Manoel Barradas (Barradão); Attendance: 2,592; Referee: Leandro Vuaden (Brazil)

==== Record ====
Final Position	Points	Matches	Wins	Draws	Losses	Goals For	Goals Away	Win%
30th	0	2	0	0	2	1	3	0%

=== Série A ===
==== Matches ====
20 April 2014 1	Santos	1–1	Sport	Santos
18:30 (UTC-3)	Gabriel 79'	Report	Neto Baiano 69'	Stadium: Estádio Urbano Caldeira (Vila Belmiro); Attendance: 7,964; Referee: Arilson Bispo da Anunciação

27 April 2014 2	Sport	2–1	Chapecoense	Recife
18:30 (UTC-3)	Rithely 11'; Ananias 38'	Report	Ricardo Conceição 36'	Stadium: Estádio Adelmar da Costa Carvalho (Ilha do Retiro); Attendance: 12,686; Referee: Francisco de Assis Almeida Filho

4 May 2014 3	Internacional	2–1	Sport	Porto Alegre
16:00 (UTC-3)	D'Alessandro 13'; Aránguiz 45+1'	Report	Patric 77'	Stadium: Estádio José Pinheiro Borda (Beira-Rio); Attendance: 17,974; Referee: Pablo dos Santos Alves

11 May 2014 4	Coritiba	0–1	Sport	Curitiba
18:30 (UTC-3)		Report	Rithely 86'	Stadium: Estádio Major Antônio (Couto Pereira); Attendance: 10,832; Referee: Jean Pierre Goncalves Lima

21 May 2014 5	Cruzeiro	2–0	Sport	Belo Horizonte
21:00 (UTC-3)	Ricardo Goulart 50'; Marcelo Moreno 77'	Report		Stadium: Estádio Governador Magalhães Pinto (Mineirão); Attendance: 13,679; Referee: Felipe Gomes da Silva

25 May 2014 6	Sport	1–4	Corinthians	Recife
16:00 (UTC-3)	Augusto César 27'	Report	Romarinho 20', 68'; Jádson 38', 54'	Stadium: Estádio Adelmar da Costa Carvalho (Ilha do Retiro); Attendance: 20,718; Referee: Péricles Bassols Pegado Cortez

28 May 2014 7	Sport	0–0	Grêmio	Recife
19:30 (UTC-3)		Report		Stadium: Estádio Adelmar da Costa Carvalho (Ilha do Retiro); Attendance: 6,893; Referee: Marcelo de Lima Henrique

31 May 2014 8	Vitória	0–1	Sport	Feira de Santana
21:00 (UTC-3)		Report	Neto Baiano 48'	Stadium: Estádio Municipal Alberto Oliveira (Joia da Princesa); Attendance: 3,152; Referee: Paulo H Godoy Bezerra

4 June 2014 9	Sport	1–0	Bahia	Recife
21:00 (UTC-3)	Mike 72'	Report		Stadium: Estádio Adelmar da Costa Carvalho (Ilha do Retiro); Attendance: 14,177; Referee: Marcelo Aparecido R de Souza

16 July 2014 10	Sport	1–0	Botafogo	Recife
19:30 (UTC-3)	Neto Baiano 43'	Report		Stadium: Estádio Adelmar da Costa Carvalho (Ilha do Retiro); Attendance: 18,532; Referee: Francisco Carlos do Nascimento

20 July 2014 11	Goiás	0–0	Sport	Goiânia
18:30 (UTC-3)		Report		Stadium: Estádio do Governo do Estado de Goiás (Serra Dourada); Attendance: 2,430; Referee: Péricles Bassols Pegado Cortez

27 July 2014 12	Sport	2–1	Atlético Mineiro	Recife
16:00 (UTC-3)	Felipe Azevedo 51'; Durval 68'	Report	Diego Tardelli 83'	Stadium: Estádio Adelmar da Costa Carvalho (Ilha do Retiro); Attendance: 16,579; Referee: Thiago Duarte Peixoto

3 August 2014 13	Figueirense	3–0	Sport	Florianópolis
16:00 (UTC-3)	Léo Lisboa 41'; Clayton 76'; Marco Antônio 83'	Report		Stadium: Estádio Orlando Scarpelli; Attendance: 5,520; Referee: Jaílson Macedo Freitas

10 August 2014 14	Flamengo	1–0	Sport	Rio de Janeiro
16:00 (UTC-3)	Eduardo da Silva 84'	Report		Stadium: Estádio Jornalista Mário Filho (Maracanã); Attendance: 42,071; Referee: Emerson de Almeida Ferreira

17 August 2014 15	Sport	1–1	Atlético Paranaense	Recife
18:30 (UTC-3)	Régis 40'	Report	Cleberson 25'	Stadium: Estádio Adelmar da Costa Carvalho (Ilha do Retiro); Attendance: 13,223; Referee: Vinícius Furlan

20 August 2014 16	Sport	2–1	Palmeiras	São Lourenço da Mata
19:30 (UTC-3)	Fábio 22' (o.g.); Patric 32'	Report	Henrique Dourado 13'	Stadium: Estádio Governador Carlos Wilson Campos (Arena Pernambuco); Attendance: 21,802; Referee: Héber Roberto Lopes

24 August 2014 17	Fluminense	4–0	Sport	Rio de Janeiro
16:00 (UTC-3)	Cícero 34'; Fred 42', 79'; Conca 49'	Report		Stadium: Estádio Jornalista Mário Filho (Maracanã); Attendance: 13,919; Referee: André Luiz de Freitas Castro

31 August 2014 18	Sport	2–0	Criciúma	Recife
16:00 (UTC-3)	Neto Baiano 50'; Danilo Barcelos 52'	Report		Stadium: Estádio Adelmar da Costa Carvalho (Ilha do Retiro); Attendance: 11,968; Referee: Luiz Flávio de Oliveira

7 September 2014 19	São Paulo	2–0	Sport	São Paulo
16:00 (UTC-3)	Rithely 7' (o.g.); Alexandre Pato 25'	Report		Stadium: Estádio Cícero Pompeu de Toledo (Morumbi); Attendance: 25,072; Referee: Bráulio da Silva Machado

10 September 2014 20	Sport	3–1	Santos	São Lourenço da Mata
21:00 (UTC-3)	Patric 40', 52', 90+1'	Report	Thiago Ribeiro 24'	Stadium: Estádio Governador Carlos Wilson Campos (Arena Pernambuco); Attendance: 13,852; Referee: Grazianni Maciel Rocha

13 September 2014 21	Chapecoense	3–1	Sport	Chapecó
18:30 (UTC-3)	Douglas Grolli 42', 86'; Tiago Luís 46'	Report	Felipe Azevedo 82'	Stadium: Arena Condá; Attendance: 4,737; Referee: Rodrigo Batista Raposo

17 September 2014 22	Sport	0–0	Internacional	São Lourenço da Mata
21:00 (UTC-3)		Report		Stadium: Estádio Governador Carlos Wilson Campos (Arena Pernambuco); Attendance: 14,581; Referee: Felipe Gomes da Silva

21 September 2014 23	Sport	1–0	Coritiba	Recife
16:00 (UTC-3)	Felipe Azevedo 74'	Report		Stadium: Estádio Adelmar da Costa Carvalho (Ilha do Retiro); Attendance: 13,180; Referee: Leandro Pedro Vuaden

24 September 2014 24	Bahia	1–0	Sport	Salvador
21:00 (UTC-3)	Railan dos Santos 72'	Report		Stadium: Itaipava Arena Fonte Nova; Attendance: 13,360; Referee: Flávio Rodrigues Guerra

27 September 2014 25	Sport	0–0	Cruzeiro	São Lourenço da Mata
18:30 (UTC-3)		Report		Stadium: Estádio Governador Carlos Wilson Campos (Arena Pernambuco); Attendance: 22,248; Referee: Marielson Alves Silva

4 October 2014 26	Corinthians	3–0	Sport	São Paulo
18:30 (UTC-3)	Anderson Martins 24'; Guerrero 72'; Luciano 90+2'	Report		Stadium: Arena Corinthians; Attendance: 29,238; Referee: Bráulio da Silva Machado

8 October 2014 27	Grêmio	2–0	Sport	Porto Alegre
22:00 (UTC-3)	Ruiz 29'; Dudu 75'	Report		Stadium: Arena do Grêmio; Attendance: 11,659; Referee: Marcelo de Lima Henrique

12 October 2014 28	Sport	1–2	Vitória	Recife
18:30 (UTC-3)	Diego Souza 40'	Report	Rithely 1' (o.g.); Dinei 28'	Stadium: Estádio Adelmar da Costa Carvalho (Ilha do Retiro); Attendance: 10,895; Referee: Leandro Pedro Vuaden

19 October 2014 29	Botafogo	1–1	Sport	Volta Redonda
18:30 (UTC-3)	Wallyson 59'	Report	Diego Souza 21'	Stadium: Estádio Municipal General Sylvio (Raulino de Oliveira); Attendance: 3,059; Referee: Ricardo Marques Ribeiro

22 October 2014 30	Sport	0–1	Goiás	Recife
22:30 (UTC-3)		Report	Esquerdinha 90'	Stadium: Estádio Adelmar da Costa Carvalho (Ilha do Retiro); Attendance: 7,780; Referee: Marcelo de Lima Henrique

25 October 2014 31	Atlético Mineiro	3–2	Sport	Belo Horizonte
18:30 (UTC-3)	Tiago 34'; Dátolo 47'; Carlos 68'	Report	Rodrigo Mancha 17'; Danilo Barcelos 78'	Stadium: Estádio Raimundo Sampaio (Independência); Attendance: 13,115; Referee: Felipe Gomes da Silva

2 November 2014 32	Sport	1–0	Figueirense	Recife
17:00 (UTC-3)	Diego Souza 64'	Report		Stadium: Estádio Adelmar da Costa Carvalho (Ilha do Retiro); Attendance: 27,779; Referee: Alinor Silva da Paixão

9 November 2014 33	Sport	2–2	Flamengo	São Lourenço da Mata
17:00 (UTC-3)	Danilo Barcelos 88'; Mike 90+1'	Report	Márcio Araújo 8'; Nixon 23'	Stadium: Estádio Governador Carlos Wilson Campos (Arena Pernambuco); Attendance: 36,615; Referee: Elmo Alves Resende Cunha

16 November 2014 34	Atlético Paranaense	0–1	Sport	Curitiba
17:00 (UTC-3)		Report	Diego Souza 54'	Stadium: Estádio Joaquim Américo Guimarães (Arena da Baixada); Attendance: 14,488; Referee: Guilherme Ceretta de Lima

19 November 2014 35	Palmeiras	0–2	Sport	São Paulo
22:00 (UTC-3)		Report	Ananias 77'; Patric 90'	Stadium: Allianz Parque; Attendance: 35,939; Referee: Dewson Fernando Freitas da Silva

23 November 2014 36	Sport	2–2	Fluminense	São Lourenço da Mata
17:00 (UTC-3)	Mike 10'; Joelinton 39'	Report	Ewerton Pascoa 31' (o.g.); Fred 45+1'	Stadium: Estádio Governador Carlos Wilson Campos (Arena Pernambuco); Attendance: 29,165; Referee: Anderson Daronco

29 November 2014 37	Criciúma	2–2	Sport	Criciúma
19:30 (UTC-3)	Lucca 47', 67'	Report	Patric 8'; Ewerton Páscoa 57'	Stadium: Estádio Heriberto Hülse; Attendance: 2,338; Referee: Wagner Reway

7 December 2014 38	Sport	1–0	São Paulo	São Lourenço da Mata
17:00 (UTC-3)	Joelinton 4'	Report		Stadium: Estádio Governador Carlos Wilson Campos (Arena Pernambuco); Attendance: 33,496; Referee: Wagner Reway

==== Record ====
Final Position	Points	Matches	Wins	Draws	Losses	Goals For	Goals Away	Win%
11th	52	38	14	10	14	36	46	46%
