= 2015 Sport Club do Recife season =

Sport Club do Recife 2015 season

Sport Recife
2015 season
- Chairman: João Humberto Martorelli
- Manager: Eduardo Baptista; Daniel Paulista (c); Paulo Roberto Falcão
- Stadium: Ilha do Retiro
- Série A: 6th
- Pernambucano: 3rd
- Copa do Brasil: Third round
- Copa do Nordeste: Semi-finals
- Copa Sudamericana: Round of 16
- Top goalscorer: League: André (13); All: Diego Souza (17)
Home colours	Away colours	Third colours

The 2015 season was Sport Recife's 111th season in the club's history. Sport competed in the Campeonato Pernambucano, Copa do Nordeste, Copa Sudamericana, Série A and Copa do Brasil.

== Final squad ==
Note: Flags indicate national team as defined under FIFA eligibility rules; some limited exceptions apply. Players may hold more than one non-FIFA nationality.

No.	Pos.	Nation	Player
1	GK	BRA	Magrão
3	DF	BRA	Ewerton Páscoa
4	DF	BRA	Durval (captain)
5	MF	BRA	Rodrigo Mancha
6	DF	BRA	Renê
7	MF	BRA	Élber (on loan from Cruzeiro)
8	MF	BRA	Marlone (on loan from Fluminense)
9	FW	BRA	Hernane
11	FW	BRA	Maikon Leite (on loan from Palmeiras)
12	GK	BRA	Danilo Fernandes
14	DF	BRA	Danilo (on loan from América-MG)
16	DF	BRA	Matheus Ferraz
17	MF	BRA	Wendel

No.	Pos.	Nation	Player
18	MF	BRA	Matheus Galdezani
19	FW	BRA	Samuel (on loan from Fluminense)
20	FW	BRA	Mike (on loan from Internacional)
21	MF	BRA	Rithely
22	DF	BRA	Oswaldo
23	GK	BRA	Luiz Carlos
25	MF	BRA	Neto
27	DF	BRA	Samuel Xavier
29	MF	BRA	Ronaldo
33	DF	BRA	Henrique Mattos (on loan from Botafogo-SP)
77	DF	BRA	Ferrugem
87	MF	BRA	Diego Souza (on loan from Metalist Kharkiv)
90	FW	BRA	André

== Statistics ==
=== Overall ===
Games played	72 (14 Pernambucano, 10 Copa do Nordeste, 6 Copa do Brasil, 4 Sudamericana, 38 Série A)
Games won	33 (9 Pernambucano, 4 Copa do Nordeste, 4 Copa do Brasil, 1 Sudamericana, 15 Série A)
Games drawn	20 (3 Pernambucano, 2 Copa do Nordeste, 0 Copa do Brasil, 1 Sudamericana, 14 Série A)
Games lost	19 (2 Pernambucano, 4 Copa do Nordeste, 2 Copa do Brasil, 2 Sudamericana, 9 Série A)
Goals scored	108
Goals conceded	70
Goal difference	+38
Best results (goal difference)	5–0 (A) v Central - Pernambucano - 2015.04.29
Worst result (goal difference)	0–3 (A) v Huracán - Copa Sudamericana - 2015.09.30; 0–3 (A) v São Paulo - Série A - 2015.10.31; 0–3 (A) v Cruzeiro - Série A - 2015.11.15
Top scorer	Diego Souza (17)

Source: Sport Recife official website

=== Goalscorers ===
Place	Pos.	Nat.	No.	Name	Campeonato Pernambucano	Copa do Nordeste	Copa do Brasil	Copa Sudamericana	Série A	Total
1	FW	(Brazil)	87	Diego Souza	4	2	2	0	9	17
2	FW	(Brazil)	90	André	0	0	0	1	13	14
3	MF	(Brazil)	7	Élber	5	1	0	1	5	12
4	MF	(Brazil)	10	Régis	1	1	3	0	3	8
5	MF	(Brazil)	11	Felipe Azevedo	3	2	1	0	0	6
6	FW	(Brazil)	9	Joelinton	2	1	1	0	1	5
=	DF	(Brazil)	16	Matheus Ferraz	0	0	0	0	5	5
=	MF	(Brazil)	21	Rithely	1	1	1	1	1	5
7	FW	(Brazil)	9	Hernane	0	0	0	2	2	4
=	MF	(Brazil)	11	Maikon Leite	0	0	0	0	4	4
=	FW	(Brazil)	20	Mike	1	2	1	0	0	4
=	DF	(Brazil)	6	Renê	0	2	1	0	1	4
8	DF	(Brazil)	14	Danilo Barcelos	2	0	0	0	1	3
=	MF	(Brazil)	8	Marlone	0	0	0	0	3	3
=	FW	(Brazil)	19	Samuel	2	1	0	0	0	3
=	MF	(Brazil)	17	Wendel	1	1	0	0	1	3
9	MF	(Brazil)	25	Neto Moura	0	0	1	0	1	2
10	DF	(Brazil)	4	Durval	1	0	0	0	0	1
=	DF	(Brazil)	3	Ewerton Páscoa	1	0	0	0	0	1
=	DF	(Brazil)	77	Ferrugem	0	0	0	0	1	1
=	DF	(Brazil)	22	Oswaldo	1	0	0	0	0	1
=	DF	(Brazil)	27	Samuel Xavier	0	0	0	0	1	1
				Own goals	0	0	0	0	1	1
				Total	25	14	11	5	53	108

=== Managers performance ===
Name	From	To	P	W	D	L	GF	GA	Avg%	Ref
(Brazil) Eduardo Baptista	24 January 2015	16 September 2015	59	27	18	14	91	56	56%	
(Brazil) Daniel Paulista (c)	20 September 2015	20 September 2015	1	0	0	1	1	2	0%	
(Brazil) Paulo Roberto Falcão	23 September 2015	6 December 2015	13	7	2	4	18	13	58%	

(c) Indicates the caretaker manager

=== Home record ===
Recife	São Lourenço da Mata
Ilha do Retiro	Arena Pernambuco
Capacity: 32,983	Capacity: 44,300
26 matches (18 wins 8 draws)	10 matches (6 wins 3 draws 1 loss)

== Friendlies ==
=== Ariano Suassuna Trophy ===
24 January 2015	Sport (Brazil)	2–1	(Uruguay) Nacional	São Lourenço da Mata
(UTC-3)	Samuel 4'; Danilo Barcelos 14'	Report	Durval (o.g.)	Stadium: Estádio Governador Carlos Wilson Campos (Arena Pernambuco); Referee: Nielson Nogueira

== Official Competitions ==
=== Campeonato Pernambucano ===
==== First stage ====
31 January 2015 1	Santa Cruz	0–3	Sport	Recife
18:30 (UTC-3)		Report	Danilo Barcelos 62' (pen.); Élber 70', 88'	Stadium: Estádio José do Rego Maciel (Arruda); Attendance: 24,143; Referee: Marcelo de Lima Henrique

8 February 2015 2	Sport	1–0	Náutico	São Lourenço da Mata
18:30 (UTC-3)	Samuel 28'	Report		Stadium: Estádio Governador Carlos Wilson Campos (Arena Pernambuco); Attendance: 13,519; Referee: Emerson Sobral

13 February 2015 3	Salgueiro	0–3	Sport	Salgueiro
20:30 (UTC-3)		Report	Danilo Barcelos 16'; Mike 72'; Élber 79'	Stadium: Estádio Cornélio de Barros; Attendance: 6,694; Referee: Sebastião Rufino Ribeiro Filho

22 February 2015 4	Sport	4–2	Serra Talhada	Recife
16:00 (UTC-3)	Joelinton 3'; Rithely 14'; Durval 70'; Régis 82' (pen.)	Report	Diogo 58'; João Carlos 88'	Stadium: Estádio Adelmar da Costa Carvalho (Ilha do Retiro); Attendance: 9,088; Referee: Anderson Freitas

26 February 2015 5	Sport	1–0	Central	Recife
19:30 (UTC-3)	Felipe Azevedo 85'	Report		Stadium: Estádio Adelmar da Costa Carvalho (Ilha do Retiro); Attendance: 9,974; Referee: Nielson Nogueira Dias

1 March 2015 6	Central	1–0	Sport	Caruaru
16:00 (UTC-3)	Janilson Madona 5'	Report		Stadium: Estádio Luiz José de Lacerda (Lacerdão); Attendance: 10,171; Referee: Luiz Cláudio Sobral

8 March 2015 7	Serra Talhada	0–1	Sport	Serra Talhada
16:00 (UTC-3)		Report	Diego Souza 7'	Stadium: Estádio Municipal Nildo Pereira de Menezes; Attendance: 5,000; Referee: Emerson Sobral

14 March 2015 8	Sport	3–1	Salgueiro	São Lourenço da Mata
19:30 (UTC-3)	Oswaldo 4'; Élber 83'; Felipe Azevedo 86'	Report	Anderson Lessa 32'	Stadium: Estádio Governador Carlos Wilson Campos (Arena Pernambuco); Attendance: 7,983; Referee: Gilberto Castro Júnior

22 March 2015 9	Náutico	0–2	Sport	São Lourenço da Mata
16:00 (UTC-3)		Report	Wendel 46'; Ewerton Páscoa 77'	Stadium: Estádio Governador Carlos Wilson Campos (Arena Pernambuco); Attendance: 6,063

5 April 2015 10	Sport	1–1	Santa Cruz	Recife
16:00 (UTC-3)	Samuel 47' (pen.)	Report	João Paulo 90+2'	Stadium: Estádio Adelmar da Costa Carvalho (Ilha do Retiro); Referee: Luiz Cláudio Sobral

==== Semi-finals ====
19 April 2015	Salgueiro	2–0	Sport	Salgueiro
16:00 (UTC-3)	Rogério 76' (pen.), 90+3' (pen.)	Report		Stadium: Estádio Cornélio de Barros

26 April 2015	Sport	1–1	Salgueiro	São Lourenço da Mata
16:00 (UTC-3)	Diego Souza 33'	Report	Valdeir 87'	Stadium: Estádio Governador Carlos Wilson Campos (Arena Pernambuco); Attendance: 25,626; Referee: Marcelo de Lima Henrique

==== Matches for third place ====
29 April 2015	Central	0–5	Sport	Caruaru
20:00 (UTC-3)		Report	Élber 31'; Diego Souza 37', 39'; Felipe Azevedo 59'; Joelinton 70'	Stadium: Estádio Luiz José de Lacerda (Lacerdão)

2 May 2015	Sport	0–0	Central	Recife
16:00 (UTC-3)		Report		Stadium: Estádio Adelmar da Costa Carvalho (Ilha do Retiro); Attendance: 3,469; Referee: Giorgio Wilton

==== Record ====
Final Position	Points	Matches	Wins	Draws	Losses	Goals For	Goals Away	Win%
3rd	30	14	9	3	2	25	8	71%

=== Copa do Nordeste ===
==== Group stage ====
4 February 2015 1	Sampaio Corrêa	3–2	Sport	São Luís
22:20 (UTC-3)	Edvanio 59'; Válber 60'; Robert 88'	Report	Rithely 14'; Régis 90+4'	Stadium: Estádio Governador João Castelo (Castelão); Attendance: 6,887; Referee: Antônio Santos Nunes

11 February 2015 2	Sport	0–0	Coruripe	Recife
20:00 (UTC-3)		Report		Stadium: Estádio Adelmar da Costa Carvalho (Ilha do Retiro); Attendance: 3,668; Referee: Pablo Ramon Goncalves Pinheiro

19 February 2015 3	Sport	3–1	Socorrense	Recife
20:45 (UTC-3)	Joelinton 54'; Mike 75'; Felipe Azevedo 86'	Report	Tiago Orobó 51'	Stadium: Estádio Adelmar da Costa Carvalho (Ilha do Retiro); Attendance: 3,932; Referee: Pablo dos Santos Alves

4 March 2015 4	Socorrense	0–3	Sport	Aracaju
22:00 (UTC-3)		Report	Mike 28'; Felipe Azevedo 75'; Wendel 79'	Stadium: Estádio Lourival Baptista (Batistão); Attendance: 1,234; Referee: Gleidson Santos Oliveira

11 March 2015 5	Coruripe	1–0	Sport	Coruripe
22:00 (UTC-3)	Willames José 62'	Report		Stadium: Estádio Gerson Amaral; Attendance: 1,364; Referee: Arilson Bispo da Anunciação

18 March 2015 6	Sport	3–1	Sampaio Corrêa	Recife
22:00 (UTC-3)	Élber 44'; Diego Souza 77'; Renê 90+2'	Report	Válber 53'	Stadium: Estádio Adelmar da Costa Carvalho (Ilha do Retiro); Attendance: 6,912; Referee: Jailson Macedo Freitas

==== Quarter-finals ====
25 March 2015	Fortaleza	1–0	Sport	Fortaleza
22:00 (UTC-3)	Everton 64'	Report		Stadium: Estádio Governador Plácido Castelo (Castelão); Attendance: 24,971; Referee: Charles Hebert Cavalcante Ferreira

29 March 2015	Sport	1–0 (4–2 p)	Fortaleza	Recife
16:00 (UTC-3)	Samuel 51'	Report		Stadium: Estádio Adelmar da Costa Carvalho (Ilha do Retiro); Attendance: 21,252; Referee: Pablo dos Santos Alves
	Penalties
	Penalty scored		Penalty scored

==== Semi-finals ====
8 April 2015	Sport	0–0	Bahia	Recife
22:00 (UTC-3)		Report		Stadium: Estádio Adelmar da Costa Carvalho (Ilha do Retiro); Attendance: 21,045; Referee: Ítalo Medeiros de Azevedo

12 April 2015	Bahia	3–2	Sport	Salvador
16:00 (UTC-3)	Souza 52', 56', 63'	Report	Diego Souza 22'; Renê 62'	Stadium: Itaipava Arena Fonte Nova; Attendance: 40,205; Referee: Pablo Ramón Goncalves Pinheiro

==== Record ====
Final Position	Points	Matches	Wins	Draws	Losses	Goals For	Goals Away	Win%
4th	14	10	4	2	4	14	10	46%

=== Copa do Brasil ===
==== First round ====
1 April 2015	CENE	1–2	Sport	Campo Grande
22:00 (UTC-3)	Marcelo Tevez 55'	Report	Joelinton 24'; Régis 46'	Stadium: Estádio Universitário Pedro Pedrossian (Morenão); Attendance: 514; Referee: Alinor Silva da Paixao

16 April 2015	Sport	4–1	CENE	Recife
21:50 (UTC-3)	Rithely 15'; Régis 37'; Felipe Azevedo 43'; Neto Moura 79'	Report	Fernando Pavão 54'	Stadium: Estádio Adelmar da Costa Carvalho (Ilha do Retiro); Attendance: 1,290; Referee: Bruno Arleu de Araújo

==== Second round ====
6 May 2015	Chapecoense	2–0	Sport	Chapecó
22:00 (UTC-3)	Hyoran 74'; Maranhão 79'	Report		Stadium: Arena Condá; Attendance: 5,740; Referee: Igor Junio Benevenuto

13 May 2015	Sport	2–0 (4–2 p)	Chapecoense	Recife
22:00 (UTC-3)	Mike 67'; Diego Souza 72' (pen.)	Report		Stadium: Estádio Adelmar da Costa Carvalho (Ilha do Retiro); Attendance: 9,012; Referee: Caio Max Augusto Vieira
	Penalties
	Penalty scored		Penalty scored

==== Third round ====
20 May 2015	Sport	2–1	Santos	Recife
22:00 (UTC-3)	Régis 4'; Renê 74'	Report	Lucas Lima 21'	Stadium: Estádio Adelmar da Costa Carvalho (Ilha do Retiro); Attendance: 6,443; Referee: Cláudio Francisco Lima e Silva

22 July 2015	Santos	3–1	Sport	Santos
22:00 (UTC-3)	Gabriel 2', 35'; Geuvânio 58'	Report	Diego Souza 40'	Stadium: Estádio Urbano Caldeira (Vila Belmiro); Attendance: 8,370; Referee: Paulo Henrique de Melo Salmazio

==== Record ====
Final Position	Points	Matches	Wins	Draws	Losses	Goals For	Goals Away	Win%
19th	12	6	4	0	2	11	8	66%

=== Copa Sudamericana ===
==== Second stage ====
19 August 2015	Bahia (Brazil)	1–0	(Brazil) Sport	Salvador
22:00 (UTC-3)	Biancucchi 25'	Report		Stadium: Itaipava Arena Fonte Nova; Attendance: 4,418; Referee: German Delfino (Argentina)

26 August 2015	Sport (Brazil)	4–1	(Brazil) Bahia	Recife
(UTC-3)	Rithely 52'; Hernane 79', 90+5'; Élber 86'	Report	Biancucchi 74'	Stadium: Estádio Adelmar da Costa Carvalho (Ilha do Retiro); Attendance: 8,201; Referee: Roberto Tobar (Chile)

==== Round of 16 ====
23 September 2015	Sport (Brazil)	1–1	(Argentina) Huracán	Recife
22:00 (UTC-3)	André 52'	Report	Bogado 75' (pen.)	Stadium: Estádio Adelmar da Costa Carvalho (Ilha do Retiro); Attendance: 7,726; Referee: Adrián Velez (Colombia)

30 September 2015	Huracán (Argentina)	3–0	(Brazil) Sport	Buenos Aires
(UTC-3)	Ábila 48', 73'; Bogado 53'	Report		Stadium: Estadio Tomás Adolfo Ducó; Referee: Júlio Quintana (Paraguay)

==== Record ====
Final Position	Points	Matches	Wins	Draws	Losses	Goals For	Goals Away	Win%
16th	4	4	1	1	2	5	6	33%

=== Série A ===
==== Matches ====
10 May 2015 1	Sport	4–1	Figueirense	Recife
16:00 (UTC-3)	Matheus Ferraz 19'; Diego Souza 63', 77'; Régis 87'	Report	Renê 67' (o.g.)	Stadium: Estádio Adelmar da Costa Carvalho (Ilha do Retiro); Attendance: 4,116; Referee: Wilton Pereira Sampaio

17 May 2015 2	Flamengo	2–2	Sport	Rio de Janeiro
16:00 (UTC-3)	Canteros 73'; Everton 85'	Report	Diego Souza 45+1'; Élber 68'	Stadium: Estádio Jornalista Mário Filho (Maracanã); Attendance: 34,459; Referee: Dewson Fernando Freitas da Silva

24 May 2015 3	Sport	1–0	Coritiba	Recife
18:30 (UTC-3)	Neto Moura 28'	Report		Stadium: Estádio Adelmar da Costa Carvalho (Ilha do Retiro); Attendance: 12,119; Referee: Sandro Meira Ricci

31 May 2015 4	Santos	2–2	Sport	Santos
11:00 (UTC-3)	Robinho 42'; Werley 69'	Report	Joelinton 50'; Samuel Xavier 90+2'	Stadium: Estádio Urbano Caldeira (Vila Belmiro); Attendance: 13,481; Referee: Marcos Andre Gomes da Penha

4 June 2015 5	Sport	1–0	Goiás	Recife
21:00 (UTC-3)	Maikon Leite 90+2'	Report		Stadium: Estádio Adelmar da Costa Carvalho (Ilha do Retiro); Attendance: 12,285; Referee: Flávio Rodrigues Guerra

7 June 2015 6	Fluminense	0–0	Sport	Rio de Janeiro
19:30 (UTC-3)		Report		Stadium: Estádio Jornalista Mário Filho (Maracanã); Attendance: 15,411; Referee: Paulo Roberto Alves Junior

13 June 2015 7	Sport	2–1	Joinville	Recife
21:00 (UTC-3)	Maikon Leite 15', 38'	Report	Marcelinho Paraíba 78'	Stadium: Estádio Adelmar da Costa Carvalho (Ilha do Retiro); Attendance: 11,020; Referee: Héber Roberto Lopes

20 June 2015 8	Sport	2–1	Vasco da Gama	São Lourenço da Mata
16:30 (UTC-3)	André 20'; Wendel 80'	Report	Riascos 41'	Stadium: Estádio Governador Carlos Wilson Campos (Arena Pernambuco); Attendance: 19,139; Referee: Anderson Daronco

27 June 2015 9	Chapecoense	1–1	Sport	Chapecó
16:00 (UTC-3)	Bruno Rangel 88'	Report	Rithely 29'	Stadium: Arena Condá; Attendance: 7,203; Referee: Wagner do Nascimento Magalhães

1 July 2015 10	Sport	3–0	Internacional	Recife
19:30 (UTC-3)	André 10', 35'; Marlone 30'	Report		Stadium: Estádio Adelmar da Costa Carvalho (Ilha do Retiro); Attendance: 23,343; Referee: Péricles Bassols Pegado Cortez

5 July 2015 11	Avaí	2–2	Sport	Florianópolis
11:00 (UTC-3)	Renanzinho 37'; Samuel Xavier 39' (o.g.)	Report	Diego Souza 20'; André 90+2'	Stadium: Estádio Aderbal Ramos da Silva (Ressacada); Attendance: 8,116; Referee: Dewson Fernando Freitas da Silva

8 July 2015 12	Atlético Mineiro	2–1	Sport	Belo Horizonte
22:00 (UTC-3)	Pratto 47'; Giovanni Augusto 59'	Report	Matheus Ferraz 49'	Stadium: Estádio Governador Magalhães Pinto (Mineirão); Attendance: 50,684; Referee: Elmo Alves Resende Cunha

12 July 2015 13	Sport	2–2	Palmeiras	São Lourenço da Mata
18:30 (UTC-3)	Matheus Ferraz 21'; André 89'	Report	Leandro Pereira 43', 58'	Stadium: Estádio Governador Carlos Wilson Campos (Arena Pernambuco); Attendance: 35,163; Referee: Emerson de Almeida Ferreira

19 July 2015 14	Sport	2–0	São Paulo	São Lourenço da Mata
16:00 (UTC-3)	Élber 35'; Ferrugem 90+2'	Report		Stadium: Estádio Governador Carlos Wilson Campos (Arena Pernambuco); Attendance: 41,994; Referee: André Luiz de Freitas Castro

25 July 2015 15	Grêmio	1–1	Sport	Porto Alegre
19:30 (UTC-3)	Pedro Rocha 45'	Report	Diego Souza 62'	Stadium: Arena do Grêmio; Attendance: 31,084; Referee: Péricles Bassols Pegado Cortez

2 August 2015 16	Sport	0–0	Cruzeiro	São Lourenço da Mata
18:30 (UTC-3)		Report		Stadium: Estádio Governador Carlos Wilson Campos (Arena Pernambuco); Attendance: 28,018; Referee: Leandro Pedro Vuaden

9 August 2015 17	Atlético Paranaense	1–1	Sport	Curitiba
11:00 (UTC-3)	Vilches 90+7'	Report	Marlone 15'	Stadium: Estádio Joaquim Américo Guimarães (Arena da Baixada); Attendance: 24,826; Referee: Anderson Daronco

12 August 2015 18	Corinthians	4–3	Sport	São Paulo
22:00 (UTC-3)	Luciano 13', 45+1'; Samuel Xavier 59' (o.g.); Jádson 86'	Report	André 16'; Hernane 71', 76'	Stadium: Arena Corinthians; Attendance: 30,941; Referee: Luiz Flavio de Oliveira

16 August 2015 19	Sport	1–1	Ponte Preta	Recife
16:00 (UTC-3)	Diego Souza 9'	Report	Borges 82'	Stadium: Estádio Adelmar da Costa Carvalho (Ilha do Retiro); Attendance: 15,595; Referee: Sandro Meira Ricci

22 August 2015 20	Figueirense	2–1	Sport	Florianópolis
21:00 (UTC-3)	Dudu 63'; Bruno Alves 69'	Report	Renê 31'	Stadium: Estádio Orlando Scarpelli; Attendance: 4,879; Referee: Wágner do Nascimento Magalhães

30 August 2015 21	Sport	0–1	Flamengo	São Lourenço da Mata
16:00 (UTC-3)		Report	Everton 5'	Stadium: Estádio Governador Carlos Wilson Campos (Arena Pernambuco); Attendance: 34,939; Referee: Bráulio da Silva Machado

2 September 2015 22	Coritiba	0–0	Sport	Curitiba
22:00 (UTC-3)		Report		Stadium: Estádio Major Antônio (Couto Pereira); Attendance: 8,303; Referee: Wilton Pereira Sampaio

6 September 2015 23	Sport	1–1	Santos	Recife
18:30 (UTC-3)	André 27'	Report	Ricardo Oliveira 20'	Stadium: Estádio Adelmar da Costa Carvalho (Ilha do Retiro); Attendance: 7,308; Referee: Emerson de Almeida Ferreira

10 September 2015 24	Goiás	1–0	Sport	Goiânia
19:30 (UTC-3)	Carlos Eduardo 80'	Report		Stadium: Estádio Serra Dourada; Attendance: 2,650; Referee: Thiago Duarte Peixoto

13 September 2015 25	Sport	1–0	Fluminense	São Lourenço da Mata
18:30 (UTC-3)	Danilo Barcelos 17'	Report		Stadium: Estádio Governador Carlos Wilson Campos (Arena Pernambuco); Attendance: 6,939; Referee: Héber Roberto Lopes

16 September 2015 26	Joinville	1–1	Sport	Joinville
19:30 (UTC-3)	Edigar Junio 38'	Report	André 90'	Stadium: Arena Joinville; Attendance: 9,512; Referee: Ricardo Marques Ribeiro

20 September 2015 27	Vasco da Gama	2–1	Sport	Rio de Janeiro
16:00 (UTC-3)	Nenê 1'; Rafael Vaz 48'	Report	Élber 39'	Stadium: Estádio Jornalista Mário Filho (Maracanã); Attendance: 22,227; Referee: Héber Roberto Lopes

27 September 2015 28	Sport	3–0	Chapecoense	Recife
18:30 (UTC-3)	Diego Souza 24'; Apodi 77' (o.g.); Régis 84'	Report		Stadium: Estádio Adelmar da Costa Carvalho (Ilha do Retiro); Attendance: 5,754; Referee: Ricardo Marques Ribeiro

3 October 2015 29	Internacional	2–1	Sport	Porto Alegre
18:30 (UTC-3)	López 64'; Rodrigo Dourado 81'	Report	Élber 79'	Stadium: Estádio José Pinheiro Borda (Beira-Rio); Attendance: 14,386; Referee: Bráulio da Silva Machado

14 October 2015 30	Sport	3–0	Avaí	Recife
19:30 (UTC-3)	Régis 60'; André 63', 83'	Report		Stadium: Estádio Adelmar da Costa Carvalho (Ilha do Retiro); Attendance: 5,049; Referee: Péricles Bassols Pegado Cortez

18 October 2015 31	Sport	4–1	Atlético Mineiro	Recife
18:30 (UTC-3)	Matheus Ferraz 7'; Diego Souza 23'; Élber 27'; Maikon Leite 53'	Report	Thiago Ribeiro 83'	Stadium: Estádio Adelmar da Costa Carvalho (Ilha do Retiro); Attendance: 15,459; Referee: Wilton Pereira Sampaio

24 October 2015 32	Palmeiras	0–2	Sport	São Paulo
21:00 (UTC-3)		Report	Marlone 15'; André 58'	Stadium: Estádio Municipal Paulo Machado de Carvalho (Pacaembu); Attendance: 19,395; Referee: André Luiz de Freitas Castro

31 October 2015 33	São Paulo	3–0	Sport	São Paulo
17:00 (UTC-3)	Ganso 18'; Luís Fabiano 43'; Michel Bastos 63'	Report		Stadium: Estádio Cícero Pompeu de Toledo (Morumbi); Attendance: 13,966; Referee: Wagner Reway

8 November 2015 34	Sport	1–0	Grêmio	Recife
19:30 (UTC-3)	André 70'	Report		Stadium: Estádio Adelmar da Costa Carvalho (Ilha do Retiro); Attendance: 11,091; Referee: Héber Roberto Lopes

15 November 2015 35	Cruzeiro	3–0	Sport	Belo Horizonte
17:00 (UTC-3)	Willians 58'; Durval 60' (o.g.); Marcos Vinícius 65'	Report		Stadium: Estádio Governador Magalhães Pinto (Mineirão); Attendance: 25,851; Referee: Marielson Alves Silva

22 November 2015 36	Sport	0–0	Atlético Paranaense	Recife
19:30 (UTC-3)		Report		Stadium: Estádio Adelmar da Costa Carvalho (Ilha do Retiro); Referee: André Luiz de Freitas Castro

29 November 2015 37	Sport	2–0	Corinthians	São Lourenço da Mata
17:00 (UTC-3)	Matheus Ferraz 25'; André 90'	Report		Stadium: Estádio Governador Carlos Wilson Campos (Arena Pernambuco); Attendance: 19,048; Referee: Ricardo Marques Ribeiro

6 December 2015 38	Ponte Preta	0–1	Sport	Campinas
17:00 (UTC-3)		Report	Diego Souza 62'	Stadium: Estádio Moisés Lucarelli; Attendance: 2,542; Referee: Péricles Bassols Pegado Cortez

==== Record ====
Final Position	Points	Matches	Wins	Draws	Losses	Goals For	Goals Away	Win%
6th	59	38	15	14	9	53	38	51%
