= Valber =

Valber may refer to:

- Válber (footballer, born 1967), full name Válber Roel de Oliveira, Brazilian football defender
- Válber (footballer, born 1971), full name Válber da Silva Costa, Brazilian football striker
- Válber (footballer, born 1981), full name Válber Mendes Ferreira, Brazilian football attacking midfielder
- Valber Huerta (born 1993), Chilean football centre-back
