= Ewerton Páscoa =

Brazilian footballer (born 1989)

Éwerton Páscoa
Personal information
- Full name: Éwerton Ribeiro Páscoa
- Date of birth: 14 March 1989 (age 37)
- Place of birth: São Paulo (city), Brazil
- Height: 1.90 m (6 ft 3 in)
- Position: Centre-back

Youth career
- 2002–2005: Palmeiras
- 2006–2009: PAEC
- 2008: → São Paulo (loan)
- 2009: → Grêmio (loan)

Senior career*
Years	Team	Apps	(Gls)
2007–2016	Audax	43	(3)
2011–2012	→ Guarani (loan)	29	(2)
2012	→ Santos (loan)	11	(0)
2013	→ Criciúma (loan)	30	(4)
2014–2016	→ Sport Recife (loan)	44	(4)
2016	→ Ceará (loan)	19	(1)
2017	Náutico	11	(0)
2017	Guarani	17	(1)
2018	Red Bull Brasil	6	(0)
2018–2019	São Bento	28	(2)
2019	CRB	53	(0)
2022	Vitória	11	(0)
2023	Joinville	8	(0)
2024	Uberlândia	1	(0)
2024	São Bento	0	(0)
2025	Villa Nova	6	(0)
Total		317	(17)
- * Club domestic league appearances and goals

Éwerton Ribeiro Páscoa (born 14 March 1989), known as Éwerton Páscoa, is a Brazilian retired footballer who played mainly as a centre-back.

== Club career ==
=== Audax ===
Ewerton began his footballing career on Audax, being included in the first team on late 2009. He then played for Audax in 2010 and 2011 Série A2.

=== Guarani ===
In 2011, Ewerton was loaned to Guarani. He played in Série B for Bugre, scoring once and appearing 20 times (18 as a starter).

=== Santos ===
After a good 2012 Campeonato Paulista, many clubs shown interesting to contract Ewerton Páscoa. On 18 May 2012, Ewerton signed a one-year loan deal with Santos.

=== Criciúma ===
On 19 December 2012, after being left out in Muricy Ramalho's plans for 2013 season, Páscoa left Santos and signed a one-year loan deal with Criciúma, until the end of 2013 season.

== Career statistics ==
Appearances and goals by club, season and competition
Club	Season	League			State League		Cup		Continental		Other		Total	
Club	Season	Division	Apps	Goals	Apps	Goals	Apps	Goals	Apps	Goals	Apps	Goals	Apps	Goals
Audax	2007	Paulista 2ª Divisão	—		1	0	—		—		—		1	0
Audax	2008	Paulista 2ª Divisão	—		28	3	—		—		—		28	3
Audax	2009	Paulista A3	—		—		—		—		10 (Note: Appearance(s) in Copa Paulista)	2	10	2
Audax	2010	Paulista A2	—		3	0	—		—		8	1	11	1
Audax	2011	Paulista A2	—		11	0	—		—		—		11	0
Audax	Subtotal		—		43	3	—		—		18	3	61	6
Guarani (loan)	2011	Série B	20	1	—		—		—		—		20	1
Guarani (loan)	2012	Série B	—		9	1	2	0	—		—		9	1
Guarani (loan)	Subtotal		20	1	9	1	2	0	—		—		31	2
Santos (loan)	2012	Série A	11	0	—		—		—		1 (Note: Appearance(s) in Recopa Sudamericana)	0	12	0
Criciúma (loan)	2013	Série A	18	0	12	4	4	0	—		—		34	4
Sport Recife (loan)	2014	Série A	17	1	11	2	3	0	1 (Note: Appearance(s) in Copa Sudamericana)	0	8 (Note: Appearance(s) in Copa do Nordeste)	0	40	3
Sport Recife (loan)	2015	Série A	7	0	9	1	4	0	1	0	8	0	29	1
Sport Recife (loan)	2016	Série A	—		0	0	1	0	—		0	0	1	0
Sport Recife (loan)	Subtotal		24	1	20	3	8	0	2	0	16	0	70	4
Ceará (loan)	2016	Série B	19	1	—		—		—		—		19	1
Náutico (loan)	2017	Série B	—		11	0	1	0	—		6	0	18	0
Guarani (loan)	2017	Série B	17	1	—		—		—		—		17	1
Red Bull Brasil	2018	Paulista	—		6	0	—		—		—		6	0
São Bento	2018	Série B	20	2	—		—		—		—		20	2
São Bento	2019	Série B	—		8	0	—		—		—		8	0
São Bento	Subtotal		20	2	8	0	—		—		—		28	2
CRB	2019	Série B	18	0	—		—		—		2	0	20	0
CRB	2020	Série B	14	0	6	0	3	0	—		4	0	27	0
CRB	2021	Série B	8	0	7	0	0	0	—		8	0	23	0
CRB	Subtotal		40	0	13	0	3	0	—		14	0	70	0
Vitória	2022	Série C	7	0	4	0	3	0	—		—		14	0
Joinville	2023	Catarinense	—		8	0	—		—		—		8	0
Uberlândia	2024	Mineiro	—		1	0	—		—		—		1	0
São Bento	2024	Paulista A2	—		—		—		—		9	1	9	1
Villa Nova	2025	Mineiro	—		6	0	—		—		—		6	0
Career total			176	6	141	11	21	0	2	0	64	4	404	21

== Honours ==
Santos

- Recopa Sudamericana: 2012

Sport Recife

- Copa do Nordeste: 2014
