= Patric (footballer, born 1989) =

Brazilian footballer

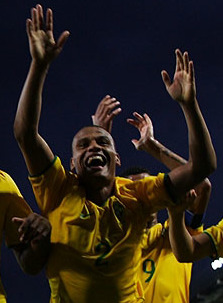

Personal information
- Full name: Patric Cabral Lalau
- Date of birth: 25 March 1989 (age 37)
- Place of birth: Criciúma, Brazil
- Height: 1.72 m (5 ft 7 1/2 in)
- Position: Right-back

Team information
- Current team: Amazonas
- Number: 2

Youth career
- Criciúma

Senior career*
Years	Team	Apps	(Gls)
2007–2009	Criciúma	39	(1)
2009	→ São Caetano (loan)	6	(1)
2009–2010	Benfica	0	(0)
2009	→ Cruzeiro (loan)	2	(0)
2010	→ Avaí (loan)	33	(1)
2011–2020	Atlético Mineiro	137	(6)
2011	→ Ponte Preta (loan)	11	(1)
2012	→ Avaí (loan)	18	(1)
2012	→ Náutico (loan)	22	(1)
2013	→ Coritiba (loan)	20	(1)
2013–2014	→ Sport Recife (loan)	72	(13)
2017	→ Vitória (loan)	39	(1)
2020–2021	Sport Recife	54	(1)
2021–2022	América Mineiro	52	(2)
2023	Athletic Club	5	(0)
2023	Itabirito	19	(1)
2023–	Amazonas	9	(0)

International career
2009	Brazil U20	6	(0)
- * Club domestic league appearances and goals as of 20:27, 19 September 2022 (UTC)

Patric Cabral Lalau (born 25 March 1989), simply known as Patric, is a Brazilian footballer who plays as a right-back for Amazonas.

As an international for the Brazil under-20 team, he was often compared to fellow countryman Maicon.

== Career ==
Patric started his career with local club Criciúma, where he played from 2007 to 2008.

In 2009, he was signed by Brasa, a proxy club for Energy Sports, both football agent and agent for investors. He was immediately loaned to São Caetano, in which he became a youth international player for the Brazilian under-20 team, where he got his first cap in 2008. In 2009, he played for Brazil at the 2009 South American Youth Championship, a tournament which Brazil won. After such fantastic displays for club and country, he received interest from Portuguese club Benfica.

On 18 April 2009, it was reported that Patric would join Benfica at the end of the season for a reported €2 million fee for 70% economic rights. It also revealed that Benfica paid €3 million immediately to Patric's former clubs when he was signed and Brasa paid back Benfica to buy 30% economic rights for €900,000 in 3 annual installments from 2009–10 season to 2011–12 season, despite Benfica signed Patric directly from Brasa.

On 29 Jun 2009, Patric was officially presented at Benfica's Estádio da Luz in Lisbon. In August 2009 Patric returned to Brazil for top division club Cruzeiro.

In January 2010, he left for Avaí on a season's long loan. In 2011 Benfica sold Patric's 100% registration rights (Note: The registration rights or federative rights, refer to the eligibility to register the player to football association, which indivisible, while economic rights, refer to eligibility to receive transfer fee. In the landmark case of Tevez, West Ham registered the player but did not eligible to receive any transfer fee but pre-agreed bonus from MSI. Despite FIFA banned and abolished federative rights or economic rights and stated no third parties had significant influence on player contract, FIFA had no binding power for internal decision of football association. FIFA only protected bonus clause of transfer contract, which involved football clubs only. Lastly, Benfica listed the bonus clause as an asset (20% economic rights of Patric), worth €582,857 in accounting (€2.04 million times 20% over 70%)) and 50% economic rights to Atlético Mineiro for a reported €1 million, Benfica remained eligible to 20% transfer fee that Mineiro received.

On 17 August 2011, in a match against Corinthians had an altercation with his coach, Cuca. He was subsequently told to practise away from the team. A series of loan deals followed. A month later, he signs his first loan deal, with Ponte Preta. There, he won promotion to the 2012 Série A.

In February 2012, Patric moves to Avaí on a second loan. He played his first match at 22 February against Joinville. In July 2012, he moved, this time to Náutico. In January 2013, he moved on loan for fourth time. In June 2013, Patric moved on loan for a fifth time, now to Sport Recife, where he would stay a further year, after a renewal of the loan deal was agreed. On 10 September 2014, he scored a hat-trick against Santos.

On 27 July 2021, Patric returned to Belo Horizonte and was presented as a new player of América Mineiro, after rescinding his contract with Sport Recife. He signed a contract until the end of the 2021 season.

== Honours ==
Avaí

- Campeonato Catarinense: 2010, 2012

Coritiba

- Campeonato Paranaense: 2013

Sport Recife

- Copa do Nordeste: 2014
- Campeonato Pernambucano: 2014

Atlético Mineiro

- Campeonato Mineiro: 2015, 2020

Vitória

- Campeonato Baiano: 2017

Athletic Club

- Recopa Mineira: 2023

Itabirito

- Campeonato Mineiro - Módulo II: 2023

Amazonas

- Campeonato Brasileiro Série C: 2023

Brazil

- 2009 South American Youth Championship: 2009
