= 2021–22 Newcastle United F.C. season =

Newcastle United
2021–22 season
- Owners: Mike Ashley (until 7 October 2021); Public Investment Fund (80%); RB Sports & Media (10%); PCP Capital Partners (10%) (from 7 October 2021)
- Chairman: Lee Charnley (until 7 October 2021); Yasir Al-Rumayyan (from 7 October 2021)
- Head coach: Steve Bruce (until 20 October 2021); Graeme Jones (interim, from 20 October 2021 to 8 November 2021); Eddie Howe (from 8 November 2021)
- Stadium: St James' Park
- Premier League: 11th
- FA Cup: Third round
- EFL Cup: Second round
- Top goalscorer: League: Callum Wilson (8); All: Callum Wilson (8)
- Highest home attendance: 52,281 (30 April 2022 v Liverpool)
- Average home league attendance: 51,443
- Biggest win: 3–0 vs Norwich City, Premier League, 23 April 2022
- Biggest defeat: 0–5 vs Manchester City, Premier League, 8 May 2022
Home colours	Away colours	Third colours

The 2021–22 season was Newcastle United's 129th year in their history and fifth consecutive season in the Premier League. Along with the league, the club also competed in the FA Cup and the EFL Cup. The season covers the period from 1 July 2021 to 30 June 2022.

== Squad ==
Squad no.	Name	Nationality	Position(s)	Date of birth (age)	Signed	Previous club
Goalkeepers
1	Martin Dúbravka	(Slovakia)	GK	15 January 1989 (aged 33)	2018	(Czech Republic) Sparta Prague
26	Karl Darlow	(England)	GK	8 October 1990 (aged 31)	2014	(England) Nottingham Forest
29	Mark Gillespie	(England)	GK	27 March 1992 (aged 30)	2020	(Scotland) Motherwell
Defenders
2	Ciaran Clark	(Republic of Ireland) (Note: Clark was born in Harrow, England.)	CB	26 September 1989 (aged 32)	2016	(England) Aston Villa
3	Paul Dummett	(Wales) (Note: Dummett was born in Newcastle upon Tyne, England.)	CB / LB	26 September 1991 (aged 30)	2010	Academy
5	Fabian Schär	(Switzerland)	CB	20 December 1991 (aged 30)	2018	(Spain) Deportivo
6	Jamaal Lascelles	(England)	CB	11 November 1993 (aged 28)	2014	(England) Nottingham Forest
12	Jamal Lewis	(Northern Ireland) (Note: Lewis was born in Luton, England.)	LB / LWB	25 January 1998 (aged 24)	2020	(England) Norwich City
13	Matt Targett	(England)	LB / LWB	18 September 1995 (aged 26)	2022	(England) Aston Villa (On Loan)
15	Kieran Trippier	(England)	RB / LB	19 September 1990 (aged 31)	2022	(Spain) Atlético Madrid
17	Emil Krafth	(Sweden)	RB / CB	2 August 1994 (aged 27)	2019	(France) Amiens
18	Federico Fernández	(Argentina)	CB	21 February 1989 (aged 33)	2018	(Wales) Swansea City
19	Javier Manquillo	(Spain)	RB / RWB / LB	5 May 1994 (aged 28)	2017	(Spain) Atlético Madrid
33	Dan Burn	(England)	CB / LB	9 May 1992 (aged 30)	2022	(England) Brighton & Hove Albion
Midfielders
7	Joelinton	(Brazil)	CM / LW / ST	16 August 1996 (aged 25)	2019	(Germany) 1899 Hoffenheim
8	Jonjo Shelvey	(England)	CM	27 February 1992 (aged 30)	2016	(Wales) Swansea City
10	Allan Saint-Maximin	(France)	LW / RW / ST	12 March 1997 (aged 25)	2019	(France) Nice
11	Matt Ritchie	(Scotland) (Note: Ritchie was born in Gosport, England.)	LW / LWB	10 September 1989 (aged 32)	2016	(England) Bournemouth
14	Isaac Hayden	(England)	CM / DM / CB	22 March 1995 (aged 27)	2016	(England) Arsenal
21	Ryan Fraser	(Scotland)	LW / RW / AM	24 February 1994 (aged 28)	2020	(England) Bournemouth
23	Jacob Murphy	(England)	RW / RWB / LW	24 February 1995 (aged 27)	2017	(England) Norwich City
24	Miguel Almirón	(Paraguay)	AM / RW / LW	10 February 1994 (aged 28)	2019	(United States) Atlanta United
28	Joe Willock	(England)	CM / AM	20 August 1999 (aged 22)	2021	(England) Arsenal
36	Sean Longstaff	(England)	CM	30 September 1997 (aged 24)	2016	Academy
39	Bruno Guimarães	(Brazil)	CM / DM	16 November 1997 (aged 24)	2022	(France) Lyon
Forwards
9	Callum Wilson	(England)	ST	27 February 1992 (aged 30)	2020	(England) Bournemouth
20	Chris Wood	(New Zealand)	ST	7 December 1991 (aged 30)	2022	(England) Burnley
30	Santiago Muñoz	(Mexico)	ST / AM	14 August 2002 (aged 19)	2021	(Mexico) Santos Laguna (On Loan)
34	Dwight Gayle	(England)	ST	17 October 1989 (aged 32)	2016	(England) Crystal Palace
Out on Loan
4	Matty Longstaff	(England)	CM	21 March 2000 (aged 22)	2019	Academy
16	Jeff Hendrick	(Republic of Ireland)	CM	31 January 1992 (aged 30)	2020	(England) Burnley
27	Freddie Woodman	(England)	GK	4 March 1997 (aged 25)	2014	Academy
32	Elliot Anderson	(Scotland) (Note: Anderson was born in Whitley Bay, England.)	AM	6 November 2002 (aged 19)	2021	Academy

== Transfers ==
=== Transfers in ===
Date	Position	Nationality	Player	From	Fee	Ref.
30 June 2021	CF	(England)	Cameron Ferguson	(England) Tranmere Rovers	Undisclosed	
1 July 2021	CB	(England)	Remi Savage	(England) Liverpool	Free transfer	
1 July 2021	LB	(England)	Charlie Wiggett	(England) Chelsea	Free transfer	
13 August 2021	CM	(England)	Joe Willock	(England) Arsenal	£25,000,000	
7 January 2022	RB	(England)	Kieran Trippier	(Spain) Atlético Madrid	£12,000,000	
13 January 2022	ST	(New Zealand)	Chris Wood	(England) Burnley	£25,000,000	
30 January 2022	CM	(Brazil)	Bruno Guimarães	(France) Lyon	£35,000,000	
31 January 2022	CB	(England)	Dan Burn	(England) Brighton & Hove Albion	£13,000,000	

=== Loans in ===
Date from	Position	Nationality	Player	From	Date until	Ref.
31 August 2021	CF	(Mexico)	Santiago Muñoz	(Mexico) Santos Laguna	January 2023	
31 January 2022	LB	(England)	Matt Targett	(England) Aston Villa	End of season	

=== Loans out ===
Date from	Position	Nationality	Player	To	Date until	Ref.
12 July 2021	CB	(England)	Lewis Cass	(England) Port Vale	1 February 2022 (Note: On 1 February, Lewis Cass' loan was terminated due to injury.)	
7 August 2021	GK	(England)	Jake Turner	(England) Colchester United	1 January 2022	
9 August 2021	CB	(England)	Kelland Watts	(England) Wigan Athletic	End of season	
27 August 2021	CM	(England)	Matty Longstaff	(Scotland) Aberdeen	1 January 2022 (Note: On 1 January, Matty Longstaff returned from his loan spell at Aberdeen.)	
31 August 2021	RW	(England)	Thomas Allan	(Scotland) Greenock Morton	19 January 2022 (Note: On 19 January, Thomas Allan returned from his loan spell at Greenock Morton.)	
31 August 2021	CB	(Republic of Ireland)	Oisin McEntee	(Scotland) Greenock Morton	End of season	
31 August 2021	AM	(Peru)	Rodrigo Vilca	(England) Doncaster Rovers	January 2022	
29 January 2022	AM	(England)	Joe White	(England) Hartlepool United	End of season	
31 January 2022	AM	(Scotland)	Elliot Anderson	(England) Bristol Rovers	End of season	
31 January 2022	CM	(Republic of Ireland)	Jeff Hendrick	(England) Queens Park Rangers	End of season	
31 January 2022	CM	(England)	Matty Longstaff	(England) Mansfield Town	End of season	
31 January 2022	LB	(England)	Matthew Bondswell	(England) Shrewsbury Town	28 March 2022 (Note: On 28 March, Matthew Bondswell returned from his loan spell at Shrewsbury Town.)	
31 January 2022	GK	(England)	Freddie Woodman	(England) Bournemouth	End of season	
1 February 2022	CM	(England)	Jack Young	(England) Wycombe Wanderers	4 April 2022 (Note: On 4 April, Jack Young's loan deal became a permanent deal.)	
12 March 2022	AM	(Peru)	Rodrigo Vilca	(Peru) Universitario	January 2023	

=== Transfers out ===
Date	Position	Nationality	Player	To	Fee	Ref.
22 July 2021	CB	(France)	Florian Lejeune	(Spain) Alavés	Undisclosed	
26 July 2021	CF	(Denmark)	Elias Sørensen	(Denmark) Esbjerg	Undisclosed	
26 August 2021	AM	(England)	Bobby Clark	(England) Liverpool	Undisclosed	
7 January 2022	LB	(England)	Rosaire Longelo	(England) Accrington Stanley	Undisclosed	
4 April 2022	CM	(England)	Jack Young	(England) Wycombe Wanderers	Undisclosed	

=== Released ===
Date	Position	Nationality	Player	To	Notes	Ref.
1 July 2021	LW	(Ghana)	Christian Atsu	(Saudi Arabia) Al-Raed	End of Contract	
1 July 2021	CB	(England)	Owen Bailey	(England) Gateshead	End of Contract	
1 July 2021	CB	(England)	Lewis Brannen		End of Contract	
1 July 2021	CF	(England)	Andy Carroll	(England) Reading	End of Contract	
1 July 2021	RB	(England)	Tai Ebanks		End of Contract	
1 July 2021	CB	(France)	Ludwig Francillette	(England) Crawley Town	End of Contract	
1 July 2021	CB	(England)	Lucas Gamblin		End of Contract	
1 July 2021	CM	(England)	Josh Gilchrist		End of Contract	
1 July 2021	CF	(England)	Josh Harrison		End of Contract	
1 July 2021	AM	(France)	Florent Indalecio		End of Contract	
1 July 2021	GK	(England)	Oliver Marshall		End of Contract	
1 July 2021	LB	(England)	Thomas Midgley		End of Contract	
1 July 2021	DM	(Wales)	George Rounsfell	(United States) Campbell Fighting Camels	End of Contract	
1 July 2021	CM	(Senegal)	Henri Saivet		End of Contract	
1 July 2021	CM	(United States)	Kyle Scott	(United States) FC Cincinnati	End of Contract	
1 July 2021	CB	(England)	Jude Swailes	(United States) College of Charleston Cougars	End of Contract	
1 July 2021	CF	(Switzerland)	Yannick Touré	(Switzerland) Young Boys	End of Contract	
1 July 2021	LB	(England)	Oliver Walters	(England) Hebburn Town	End of Contract	
3 August 2021	CF	(Japan)	Yoshinori Muto	(Japan) Vissel Kobe	Mutual consent	

== Pre-season and friendlies ==
Newcastle United confirmed they would play friendly matches against York City, Doncaster Rovers, Rotherham United, Burton Albion, Burnley, and Norwich City, as part of their pre-season schedule.

Newcastle United were due to play Harrogate Town on 18 July 2021, it was originally decided that half of the first team players would go to the Harrogate Town match whilst the other half would go to the York City match but due to Karl Darlow receiving a positive COVID-19 test, it was decided that Newcastle United's first team would travel to the York City match and the Under-23's team would instead travel to the Harrogate Town match.

On 23 January 2022, Newcastle United announced that the first team squad would travel to Saudi Arabia for a week-long training camp. As part of that visit, it was also confirmed that Newcastle United would play a friendly match against Saudi Professional League side Al-Ittihad on 28 January 2022.

18 July 2021 Friendly	York City	1–0	Newcastle United	Huntington
14:00 BST	Duckworth 87'	Report		Stadium: York Community Stadium; Referee: Rebecca Welch

23 July 2021 Friendly	Doncaster Rovers	2–3	Newcastle United	Doncaster
19:00 BST	Rowe 30'; Bogle 76'	Report	Fraser 12'; S. Longstaff 24'; Wilson 56'	Stadium: Keepmoat Stadium; Attendance: 6,787; Referee: James Bell

27 July 2021 Friendly	Rotherham United	1–1	Newcastle United	Rotherham
19:00 BST	Smith 8'	Report	Hendrick 84'	Stadium: AESSEAL New York Stadium; Attendance: 4,370; Referee: Bobby Madley

30 July 2021 Friendly	Burton Albion	0–2	Newcastle United	Burton upon Trent
19:45 BST		Report	Murphy 6'; Joelinton 46'	Stadium: Pirelli Stadium; Attendance: 3,598; Referee: James Oldham

3 August 2021 Friendly	Burnley	1–0	Newcastle United	Burnley
13:00 BST	Rodriguez 70'	Report		Stadium: Turf Moor; Attendance: 0 Referee: Peter Bankes

7 August 2021 Friendly	Newcastle United	3–0	Norwich City	Newcastle upon Tyne
14:00 BST	Ritchie 55'; Gayle 74', 88'	Report		Stadium: St James' Park; Referee: Michael Salisbury

28 January 2022 Friendly	Al-Ittihad	1–2	Newcastle United	Jeddah
15:50 GMT	Hamdallah 33', (red card)	Report	Saint-Maximin 9'; Fraser 57'; Clark (red card)	Stadium: Prince Abdullah Al Faisal Stadium; Attendance: 0

== Competitions ==
=== Overall summary ===
Competition	First match	Last match	Starting round	Final position	Record							
Competition	First match	Last match	Starting round	Final position	Pld	W	D	L	GF	GA	GD	Win %
Premier League	15 August 2021	22 May 2022	Matchday 1	11th	38	13	10	15	44	62	−18	34.21
FA Cup	8 January 2022		Third round	Third round	1	0	0	1	0	1	−1	0.00
EFL Cup	25 August 2021		Second round	Second round	1	0	1	0	0	0	+0	0.00
Total					40	13	11	16	44	63	−19	32.50

Source: Soccerway

=== Premier League ===
==== League table ====
Pos	Team	Pld	W	D	L	GF	GA	GD	Pts
9	Brighton & Hove Albion	38	12	15	11	42	44	−2	51
10	Wolverhampton Wanderers	38	15	6	17	38	43	−5	51
11	Newcastle United	38	13	10	15	44	62	−18	49
12	Crystal Palace	38	11	15	12	50	46	+4	48
13	Brentford	38	13	7	18	48	56	−8	46

Source: Premier League
Rules for classification: 1) Points; 2) Goal difference; 3) Goals scored; 4) If the champions, relegated teams or qualified teams for UEFA competitions cannot be determined by rules 1 to 3, rules 4.1 to 4.3 are applied – 4.1) Points gained in head-to-head record between such teams; 4.2) Away goals scored in head-to-head record between such teams; 4.3) Play-offs

==== Results summary ====
Overall								Home						Away					
Pld	W	D	L	GF	GA	GD	Pts	W	D	L	GF	GA	GD	W	D	L	GF	GA	GD
38	13	10	15	44	62	−18	49	8	6	5	26	27	−1	5	4	10	18	35	−17

==== Results by matchday ====
Matchday	1	2	3	4	5	6	7	8	9	10	11	12	13	14	15	16	17	18	19	20	21	22	23	24	25	26	27	28	29	30	31	32	33	34	35	36	37	38
Ground	H	A	H	A	H	A	A	H	A	H	A	H	A	H	H	A	A	H	H	H	A	H	H	A	A	H	A	A	A	A	H	H	H	A	H	A	H	A
Result	L	L	D	L	D	D	L	L	D	L	D	D	L	D	W	L	L	L	D	D	W	W	W	D	W	W	W	L	L	L	W	W	W	W	L	L	W	W
Position	15	18	17	19	18	17	19	19	19	19	19	20	20	20	19	19	19	19	19	19	18	17	17	17	14	14	14	14	14	15	15	14	11	9	10	13	12	11

Source: Statto.com
A = Away; H = Home; W = Win; D = Draw; L = Loss

==== Matches ====
The league fixtures were announced on 16 June 2021.

15 August 2021 1	Newcastle United	2–4	West Ham United	Newcastle upon Tyne
14:00 BST	Wilson 5'; Murphy 40'; Shelvey (yellow card) 51'	Report	Cresswell 18'; Benrahma 53'; Souček 63'; Antonio 66'	Stadium: St James' Park; Attendance: 50,673 (2,978 away); Referee: Martin Atkinson

21 August 2021 2	Aston Villa	2–0	Newcastle United	Birmingham
15:00 BST	Douglas Luiz (yellow card) 45+1'; Ings 45+3'; El Ghazi 62' (pen.); Martínez (yellow card) 75'; Buendía (yellow card) 85'	Report	Wilson (yellow card) 41'; Hayden (yellow card) 45'; Murphy (yellow card) 57'; Schär (yellow card) 84'	Stadium: Villa Park; Attendance: 41,964 (2,950 away); Referee: David Coote

28 August 2021 3	Newcastle United	2–2	Southampton	Newcastle upon Tyne
15:00 BST	Schär (yellow card) 40'; Wilson 52'; Saint-Maximin 90', (yellow card) 90+1'; Lascelles (yellow card) 90+5'	Report	Walker-Peters (yellow card) 30'; Djenepo (yellow card) 56'; Elyounoussi 74'; Ward-Prowse (yellow card) 79', (goal) 90+6' (pen.)	Stadium: St James' Park; Attendance: 44,017 (1,278 away); Referee: Paul Tierney

11 September 2021 4	Manchester United	4–1	Newcastle United	Manchester
15:00 BST	Ronaldo 45+2', 62'; Pogba (yellow card) 60'; Fernandes 80'; Lingard 90+2'	Report	Manquillo 56'	Stadium: Old Trafford; Attendance: 72,732 (3,100 away); Referee: Anthony Taylor

17 September 2021 5	Newcastle United	1–1	Leeds United	Newcastle upon Tyne
20:00 BST	Ritchie (yellow card) 8'; Almirón (yellow card) 39'; Saint-Maximin 44'	Report	Raphinha 13'; Rodrigo (yellow card) 57'; Firpo (yellow card) 80'	Stadium: St James' Park; Attendance: 50,407 (3,200 away); Referee: Mike Dean

25 September 2021 6	Watford	1–1	Newcastle United	Watford
15:00 BST	Dennis (yellow card) 17'; Troost-Ekong (yellow card) 40'; Rose (yellow card) 56'; Cathcart (yellow card) 69'; Sarr 72'	Report	Manquillo (yellow card) 18'; S. Longstaff 23'; Ritchie (yellow card) 30'; Darlow (yellow card) 90+1'	Stadium: Vicarage Road; Attendance: 20,650 (2,292 away); Referee: Jarred Gillett

2 October 2021 7	Wolverhampton Wanderers	2–1	Newcastle United	Wolverhampton
15:00 BST	Hwang 20', 58'	Report	Hendrick 41'; Clark (yellow card) 56'; Manquillo (yellow card) 60'	Stadium: Molineux; Attendance: 30,483 (2,963 away); Referee: Graham Scott

17 October 2021 8	Newcastle United	2–3	Tottenham Hotspur	Newcastle upon Tyne
16:30 BST	Wilson 2'; S. Longstaff (yellow card) 34'; Clark (yellow card) 54'; Hayden (yellow card) 68'; Shelvey (yellow card) 78' (yellow-red card) 83'; Dier 89' (o.g.); Joelinton (yellow card) 90+4'	Report	Ndombele 17'; Kane 22'; Son 45+3'; Emerson (yellow card) 64'	Stadium: St James' Park; Attendance: 52,214 (3,227 away); Referee: Andre Marriner

23 October 2021 9	Crystal Palace	1–1	Newcastle United	Selhurst
15:00 BST	Andersen (yellow card) 13'; Ward (yellow card) 27'; Benteke 56', (yellow card) 89'	Report	Wilson (yellow card) 27', (goal) 65'; Lascelles (yellow card) 59'; Joelinton (yellow card) 90+2'; Ritchie (yellow card) 90+4'	Stadium: Selhurst Park; Attendance: 24,609 (2,800 away); Referee: Darren England

30 October 2021 10	Newcastle United	0–3	Chelsea	Newcastle upon Tyne
15:00 BST	Hayden (yellow card) 17'; Ritchie (yellow card) 39'; Lascelles (yellow card) 55'	Report	Kanté (yellow card) 54'; Ziyech (yellow card) 57'; James 65', 77'; Jorginho 81' (pen.)	Stadium: St James' Park; Attendance: 52,208 (3,227 away); Referee: Paul Tierney

6 November 2021 11	Brighton & Hove Albion	1–1	Newcastle United	Falmer
17:30 GMT	Trossard 24' (pen.); Lallana (yellow card) 74'; Bissouma (yellow card) 84'; Maupay (yellow card) 84'; Sánchez (red card) 90+2'	Report	Lascelles (yellow card) 12'; Murphy (yellow card) 61'; Hayden 66'; Shelvey (yellow card) 69'; Wilson (yellow card) 73'	Stadium: Falmer Stadium; Attendance: 31,267 (3,100 away); Referee: David Coote

20 November 2021 12	Newcastle United	3–3	Brentford	Newcastle upon Tyne
15:00 GMT	Lascelles 10'; Joelinton 39'; Wilson (yellow card) 46'; Saint-Maximin 75', (yellow card) 75'	Report	Toney 11'; Henry 31'; Ghoddos (yellow card) 42'; Lascelles 61' (o.g.); Nørgaard (yellow card) 83'	Stadium: St James' Park; Attendance: 52,131 (2,750 away); Referee: Robert Jones

27 November 2021 13	Arsenal	2–0	Newcastle United	Holloway
12:30 GMT	Saka 56'; Martinelli 66'; Aubameyang (yellow card) 76'	Report	Ritchie (yellow card) 44'; Krafth (yellow card) 48'; Lascelles (yellow card) 63'	Stadium: Emirates Stadium; Attendance: 59,886 (3,000 away); Referee: Stuart Attwell

30 November 2021 14	Newcastle United	1–1	Norwich City	Newcastle upon Tyne
19:30 GMT	Clark (red card) 9'; Wilson 61' (pen.)	Report	Pukki 79'	Stadium: St James' Park; Attendance: 50,757 (1,100 away); Referee: Andrew Madley

4 December 2021 15	Newcastle United	1–0	Burnley	Newcastle upon Tyne
15:00 GMT	Wilson 40'; Manquillo (yellow card) 87'	Report	Collins (yellow card) 75'	Stadium: St James' Park; Attendance: 51,948 (1,998 away); Referee: Paul Tierney

12 December 2021 16	Leicester City	4–0	Newcastle United	Leicester
14:00 GMT	Castagne (yellow card) 11'; Tielemans 38' (pen.), 81'; Daka 57'; Söyüncü (yellow card) 65'; Maddison 85'	Report	Lewis (yellow card) 24'; Manquillo (yellow card) 70'; Saint-Maximin (yellow card) 90'	Stadium: King Power Stadium; Attendance: 31,959 (3,300 away); Referee: Peter Bankes

16 December 2021 17	Liverpool	3–1	Newcastle United	Liverpool
20:00 GMT	Jota 21'; Salah 25'; Henderson (yellow card) 70'; Alexander-Arnold 87'	Report	Shelvey 7'; Joelinton (yellow card) 45+2'; Fraser (yellow card) 55'; Hayden (yellow card) 87'	Stadium: Anfield; Attendance: 52,951 (2,936 away); Referee: Mike Dean

19 December 2021 18	Newcastle United	0–4	Manchester City	Newcastle upon Tyne
14:00 GMT	Hayden (yellow card) 21'	Report	Dias 5'; Rodri (yellow card) 25'; Cancelo 27'; Silva (yellow card) 30'; Mahrez 63'; Sterling 86'	Stadium: St James' Park; Attendance: 52,127 (3,135 away); Referee: Martin Atkinson

27 December 2021 19	Newcastle United	1–1	Manchester United	Newcastle upon Tyne
20:00 GMT	Saint-Maximin 7'; Krafth (yellow card) 66'; Joelinton (yellow card) 70'; Manquillo (yellow card) 90+5'	Report	Ronaldo (yellow card) 57'; Fernandes (yellow card) 66'; Maguire (yellow card) 68'; Cavani 71'	Stadium: St James' Park; Attendance: 52,178 (3,185 away); Referee: Craig Pawson

15 January 2022 22	Newcastle United	1–1	Watford	Newcastle upon Tyne
15:00 GMT	Shelvey (yellow card) 6'; Saint-Maximin 49'; Fraser (yellow card) 53'; Dummett (yellow card) 71'	Report	Sissoko (yellow card) 51'; João Pedro 88'; Samir (yellow card) 90'	Stadium: St James' Park; Attendance: 52,223 (1,600 away); Referee: Paul Tierney

22 January 2022 23	Leeds United	0–1	Newcastle United	Leeds
15:00 GMT	James (yellow card) 57'; Dallas (yellow card) 67'; Llorente (yellow card) 74'; Rodrigo (yellow card) 84'	Report	Saint-Maximin (yellow card) 57'; Dummett (yellow card) 62'; Shelvey 75'	Stadium: Elland Road; Attendance: 36,405 (2,600 away); Referee: Chris Kavanagh

8 February 2022 24	Newcastle United	3–1	Everton	Newcastle upon Tyne
19:45 GMT	Shelvey (yellow card) 33'; Holgate 37' (o.g.); Schär (yellow card) 50'; Fraser 56'; Trippier 80'	Report	Holgate (yellow card) 14'; Lascelles 36' (o.g.); Gomes (yellow card) 47'; Allan (yellow card) 79'	Stadium: St James' Park; Attendance: 52,186 (3,150 away); Referee: Anthony Taylor

13 February 2022 25	Newcastle United	1–0	Aston Villa	Newcastle upon Tyne
14:00 GMT	Trippier 35'; Joelinton (yellow card) 39'; Burn (yellow card) 66'; Shelvey (yellow card) 82'	Report	McGinn (yellow card) 42'; Douglas Luiz (yellow card) 89'; Bailey (yellow card) 90+5'; Ramsey (yellow card) 90+7'	Stadium: St James' Park; Attendance: 52,207 (3,209 away); Referee: Craig Pawson

19 February 2022 26	West Ham United	1–1	Newcastle United	Stratford
12:30 GMT	Fredericks (yellow card) 21'; Dawson 32'; Fornals (yellow card) 90'; Bowen (yellow card) 90+5'	Report	Krafth (yellow card) 31'; Willock 45+1'; Fraser (yellow card) 76'; Burn (yellow card) 90+5'	Stadium: London Stadium; Attendance: 59,949 (3,000 away); Referee: Chris Kavanagh

26 February 2022 27	Brentford	0–2	Newcastle United	Brentford
15:00 GMT	Dasilva (red card) 11'; Ajer (yellow card) 45+1'; Mbeumo (yellow card) 84'; Janelt (yellow card) 90+5'	Report	Joelinton 33'; Willock 44'; Dúbravka (yellow card) 68'	Stadium: Brentford Community Stadium; Attendance: 17,039 (1,713 away); Referee: Mike Dean

5 March 2022 28	Newcastle United	2–1	Brighton & Hove Albion	Newcastle upon Tyne
15:00 GMT	Fraser 12'; Schär 14'; Joelinton (yellow card) 87'	Report	Dunk 55'; Duffy (yellow card) 63'	Stadium: St James' Park; Attendance: 52,214 (1,650 away); Referee: Martin Atkinson

10 March 2022 21	Southampton	1–2	Newcastle United	Southampton
19:30 GMT	Armstrong 25'; Bednarek (yellow card) 72'	Report	Murphy (yellow card) 16'; Wood 32'; Bruno Guimarães 52'	Stadium: St. Mary's Stadium; Attendance: 31,016 (3,269 away); Referee: Kevin Friend
Note: The match was originally scheduled for 2 January 2022, but was postponed due to a COVID-19 outbreak and injury problems at Newcastle United.

13 March 2022 29	Chelsea	1–0	Newcastle United	Fulham
14:00 GMT	Havertz (yellow card) 39', (goal) 89'; Ziyech (yellow card) 58'; Kovačić (yellow card) 87'; Rüdiger (yellow card) 90+1'	Report	Murphy (yellow card) 50'; Bruno Guimarães (yellow card) 80'; Gayle (yellow card) 90+2'	Stadium: Stamford Bridge; Attendance: 40,026 (3,000 away); Referee: David Coote

17 March 2022 20	Everton	1–0	Newcastle United	Walton
19:45 GMT	Richarlison (yellow card) 64'; Gordon (yellow card) 76'; Allan (red card) 83'; Iwobi 90+9'	Report	Krafth (yellow card) 76'	Stadium: Goodison Park; Attendance: 39,068 (3,000 away); Referee: Craig Pawson
Note: The match was originally scheduled for 30 December 2021, but was postponed due to a COVID-19 outbreak and injury problems at Newcastle United.

3 April 2022 31	Tottenham Hotspur	5–1	Newcastle United	London
16:30 BST	Kane (yellow card) 26'; Davies 43'; Bentancur (yellow card) 45+3'; Doherty 48'; Son 54'; Emerson 63'; Bergwijn 83'	Report	Schär 39'; Saint-Maximin (yellow card) 45+3'; Joelinton (yellow card) 45+3'; Burn (yellow card) 46'	Stadium: Tottenham Hotspur Stadium; Attendance: 57,553 (3,000 away); Referee: Martin Atkinson

8 April 2022 32	Newcastle United	1–0	Wolverhampton Wanderers	Newcastle upon Tyne
20:00 BST	Schär (yellow card) 56'; Wood 72' (pen.)	Report	Moutinho (yellow card) 87'	Stadium: St James' Park; Attendance: 52,164 (3,199 away); Referee: Peter Bankes

17 April 2022 33	Newcastle United	2–1	Leicester City	Newcastle upon Tyne
14:15 BST	Bruno Guimarães 30', 90+5', (yellow card) 90+6'; Krafth (yellow card) 84'	Report	Amartey (yellow card) 1'; Lookman 19'; Mendy (yellow card) 90+6'	Stadium: St James' Park; Attendance: 52,104 (2,746 away); Referee: Jarred Gillett

20 April 2022 30	Newcastle United	1–0	Crystal Palace	Newcastle upon Tyne
19:45 BST	Almirón 32', (yellow card) 33'	Report	Gallagher (yellow card) 45+2'	Stadium: St James' Park; Attendance: 51,938 (804 away); Referee: Tony Harrington
Note: The match was originally scheduled for 20 March 2022, but was postponed due to Crystal Palace's participation in the FA Cup quarter-finals.

23 April 2022 34	Norwich City	0–3	Newcastle United	Norwich
15:00 BST		Report	Joelinton 35', 41'; Saint-Maximin (yellow card) 39'; Bruno Guimarães 49', (yellow card) 52'	Stadium: Carrow Road; Attendance: 26,910 (2,650 away); Referee: Chris Kavanagh

30 April 2022 35	Newcastle United	0–1	Liverpool	Newcastle upon Tyne
12:30 BST	Joelinton (yellow card) 43'	Report	Keïta 19'; Jota (yellow card) 43'; Gomez (yellow card) 51'; Mané (yellow card) 69'	Stadium: St James' Park; Attendance: 52,281 (3,209 away); Referee: Andre Marriner

8 May 2022 36	Manchester City	5–0	Newcastle United	Manchester
16:30 BST	Sterling 19', 90+3'; Laporte 38'; Rodri 61'; De Bruyne (yellow card) 75'; Foden 90+1'	Report	Bruno Guimarães (yellow card) 31'; Burn (yellow card) 70'; Targett (yellow card) 89'	Stadium: Etihad Stadium; Attendance: 53,336 (3,000 away); Referee: Stuart Attwell

16 May 2022 37	Newcastle United	2–0	Arsenal	Newcastle upon Tyne
20:00 BST	White 55' (o.g.); Bruno Guimarães 85'	Report	White (yellow card) 8'; Nketiah (yellow card) 47'; Xhaka (yellow card) 90+5'	Stadium: St James' Park; Attendance: 52,274 (3,209 away); Referee: Darren England

22 May 2022 38	Burnley	1–2	Newcastle United	Burnley
16:00 BST	Tarkowski (yellow card) 65'; Cornet 69'	Report	Wilson 20' (pen.), 60'	Stadium: Turf Moor; Attendance: 21,361 (2,350 away); Referee: Craig Pawson

=== FA Cup ===
The Magpies were drawn at home to Cambridge United in the third round.

8 January 2022 Third round	Newcastle United	0–1	Cambridge United	Newcastle upon Tyne
15:00 GMT		Report	Ironside 56'; Knibbs (yellow card) 66'; Lankester (yellow card) 79'	Stadium: St James' Park; Attendance: 51,395; Referee: Michael Salisbury

=== EFL Cup ===
The Magpies were drawn at home to Burnley in the second round.

25 August 2021 Second round	Newcastle United	0–0 (3–4 p)	Burnley	Newcastle upon Tyne
19:45 BST		Report	Collins (yellow card) 79'; McNeil (yellow card) 80'	Stadium: St James' Park; Attendance: 30,082; Referee: Oliver Langford
	Penalties
	Saint-Maximin (penalty missed); Willock (penalty scored); Joelinton (penalty scored); S. Longstaff (penalty scored); Almirón (penalty missed)		(penalty scored) Wood; (penalty scored) Barnes; (penalty scored) McNeil; (penalty missed) Brownhill; (penalty scored) Taylor

== Statistics ==
=== Appearances and goals ===
Last updated on 22 May 2022.

No.	Pos	Nat	Player	Total		Premier League		FA Cup		EFL Cup	
No.	Pos	Nat	Player	Apps	Goals	Apps	Goals	Apps	Goals	Apps	Goals
Goalkeepers
1	GK	(Slovakia) SVK	Martin Dúbravka	27	0	26	0	1	0	0	0
26	GK	(England) ENG	Karl Darlow	8	0	8	0	0	0	0	0
Defenders
2	DF	(Republic of Ireland) IRL	Ciaran Clark	14	0	12+1	0	0	0	1	0
3	DF	(Wales) WAL	Paul Dummett	3	0	2+1	0	0	0	0	0
5	DF	(Switzerland) SUI	Fabian Schär	26	2	25	2	1	0	0	0
6	DF	(England) ENG	Jamaal Lascelles	26	1	22+3	1	0	0	1	0
11	DF	(Scotland) SCO	Matt Ritchie	18	0	14+3	0	1	0	0	0
12	DF	(Northern Ireland) NIR	Jamal Lewis	6	0	4+1	0	0	0	1	0
13	DF	(England) ENG	Matt Targett	16	0	16	0	0	0	0	0
15	DF	(England) ENG	Kieran Trippier	7	2	5+1	2	1	0	0	0
17	DF	(Sweden) SWE	Emil Krafth	22	0	18+2	0	1	0	1	0
18	DF	(Argentina) ARG	Federico Fernández	7	0	5+2	0	0	0	0	0
19	DF	(Spain) ESP	Javier Manquillo	21	1	15+4	1	0+1	0	1	0
33	DF	(England) ENG	Dan Burn	16	0	16	0	0	0	0	0
Midfielders
7	MF	(Brazil) BRA	Joelinton	36	4	29+5	4	1	0	1	0
8	MF	(England) ENG	Jonjo Shelvey	25	2	22+2	2	1	0	0	0
10	MF	(France) FRA	Allan Saint-Maximin	37	5	31+4	5	1	0	0+1	0
14	MF	(England) ENG	Isaac Hayden	14	1	12+2	1	0	0	0	0
21	MF	(Scotland) SCO	Ryan Fraser	29	2	18+9	2	1	0	1	0}
23	MF	(England) ENG	Jacob Murphy	33	1	13+19	1	1	0	0	0
24	MF	(Paraguay) PAR	Miguel Almirón	30	1	19+9	1	0+1	0	0+1	0
28	MF	(England) ENG	Joe Willock	31	2	24+5	2	0+1	0	0+1	0
36	MF	(England) ENG	Sean Longstaff	26	1	15+9	1	1	0	1	0
39	MF	(Brazil) BRA	Bruno Guimarães	17	5	11+6	5	0	0	0	0
Forwards
9	FW	(England) ENG	Callum Wilson	18	8	16+2	8	0	0	0	0
20	FW	(New Zealand) NZL	Chris Wood	17	2	15+2	2	0	0	0	0
34	FW	(England) ENG	Dwight Gayle	9	0	0+8	0	0	0	1	0
Player(s) who left on loan but featured this season
16	MF	(Republic of Ireland) IRL	Jeff Hendrick	4	1	0+3	1	0	0	1	0
27	GK	(England) ENG	Freddie Woodman	5	0	4	0	0	0	1	0

== See also ==
- 2021–22 in English football
- List of Newcastle United F.C. seasons
