= Joelinton =

Brazilian footballer (born 1996)

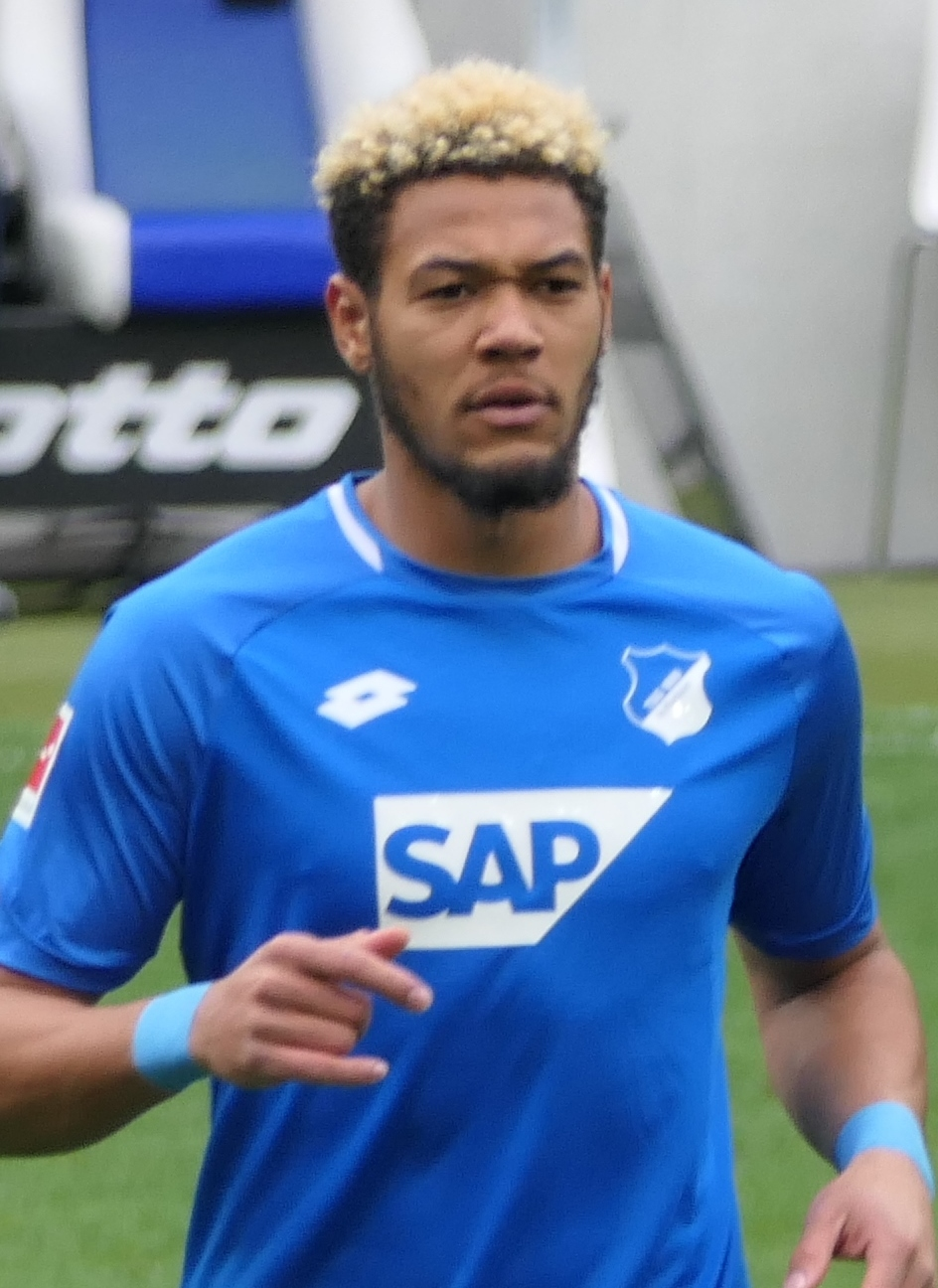
- Joelinton playing for TSG Hoffenheim in 2019

Personal information
- Full name: Joelinton Cássio Apolinário de Lira
- Date of birth: 14 August 1996 (age 30)
- Place of birth: Aliança, Pernambuco, Brazil
- Height: 1.86 m (6 ft 1 in)
- Positions: Midfielder; winger

Team information
- Current team: Newcastle United
- Number: 7

Youth career
- 2010–2014: Sport Recife

Senior career*
Years	Team	Apps	(Gls)
2014–2015	Sport Recife	23	(5)
2015–2019	TSG Hoffenheim	29	(7)
2016–2018	→ Rapid Wien (loan)	60	(15)
2019–	Newcastle United	212	(24)

International career^{‡}
2012	Brazil U17	4	(2)
2023–	Brazil	8	(1)
- * Club domestic league appearances and goals as of 23:59, 10 May 2026 (UTC) ‡ National team caps and goals as of 19:14, 14 October 2025

Joelinton Cássio Apolinário de Lira (Brazilian Portuguese: [ʒoˈɛlĩtõw̃]; born 14 August 1996), known mononymously as Joelinton, as is a Brazilian professional footballer who plays as a midfielder or winger for Premier League club Newcastle United and the Brazil national team.

Starting his career with Sport Recife, Joelinton joined Hoffenheim in 2015, and was loaned to Rapid Wien for two years from 2016, before joining Newcastle United in 2019, where he was converted from a striker to a midfielder under the management of Eddie Howe. He has also been capped for the Brazil under-17 national team, and made his debut for the senior team in 2023.

== Club career ==
=== Sport Recife ===
Born in Aliança, Pernambuco, Joelinton joined Sport Recife in 2012 and spent two years playing in the youth team. He was promoted to the senior squad in 2013, but it was not until March 2014 that he made his professional debut, in a Copa do Nordeste match against city rivals Santa Cruz. He came on as a 62nd-minute substitute for Neto Baiano in the 2–1 away semi-final win (4–1 aggregate). Sport won the cup with a 3–1 aggregate win over Ceará in the final; Joelinton did not play. He was on the bench six times in the Campeonato Pernambucano season, which they also won.

In the 2014 Campeonato Brasileiro Série A season, Joelinton made seven appearances towards the end of the campaign. He scored his first career goal on 23 November in a 2–2 home draw with Fluminense, and on the last day he scored the only goal against São Paulo after four minutes.

Joelinton established himself in the first team in the 2015 state league. However, he received two straight red cards in the second phase, against Santa Cruz and Náutico.

=== TSG Hoffenheim ===
In June 2015, TSG Hoffenheim signed Joelinton on a five-year contract. He played only once in his first season in Germany, as a last-minute substitute for Jonathan Schmid in a 1–0 loss at Schalke 04 on 18 December.

==== Loan to Rapid Wien ====
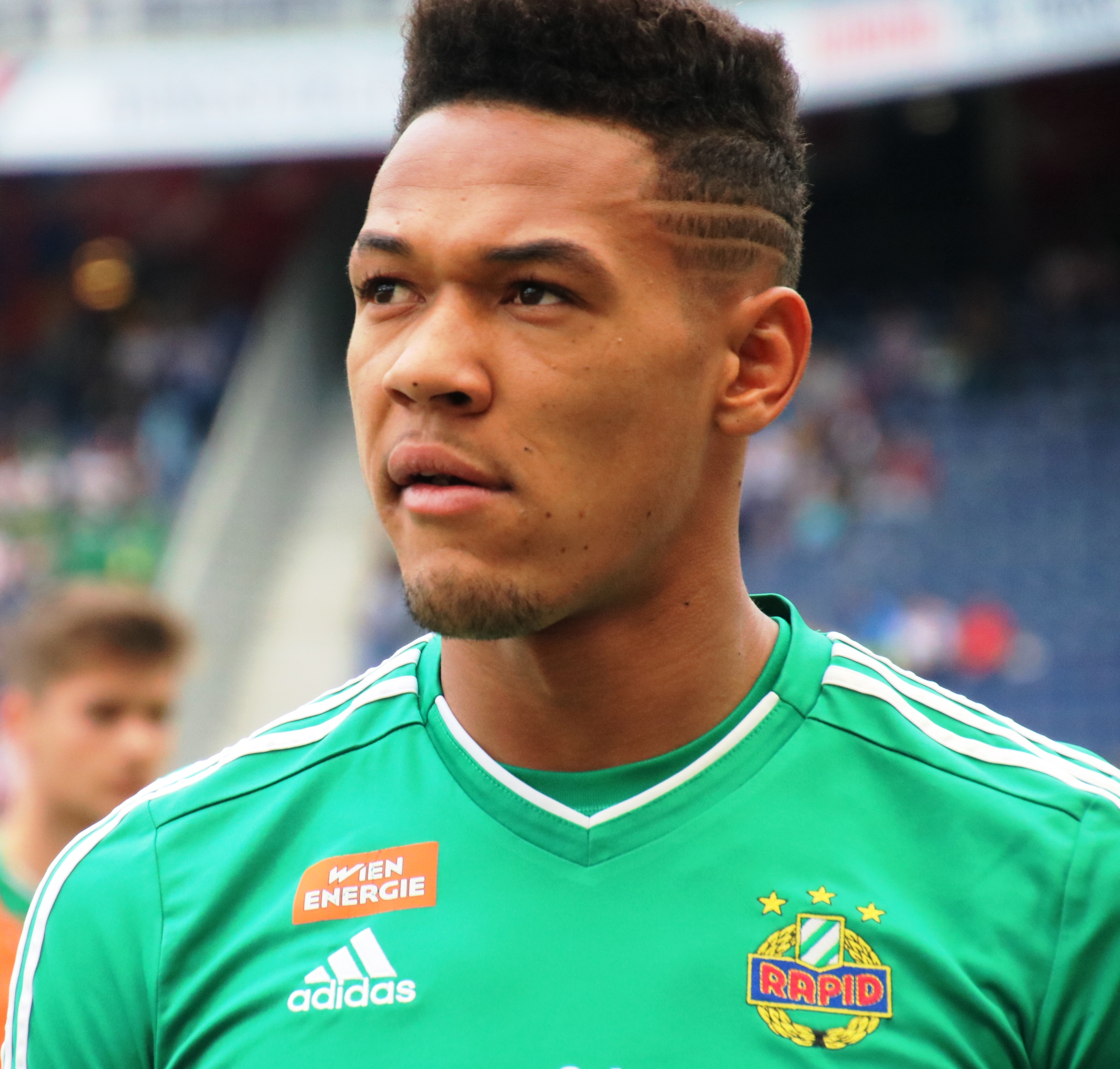
Joelinton playing for Rapid Wien in 2017

On 23 June 2016, Joelinton was loaned to Rapid Wien for two years. He made his debut on 8 July in the first round of the Austrian Cup against Regionalliga Ost club Karabakh Wien, scoring the opening goal of a 3–1 victory. In the semi-finals on 26 April 2017, he scored an added-time winner at home to LASK as Die Grün-Weißen reached the final for the first time in 12 years. He equalised in the final at the Worthersee Stadion on 1 June, but Red Bull Salzburg won 2–1.

Joelinton played all ten of Rapid's 2016–17 UEFA Europa League matches, scoring in a 3–2 win over Genk on 15 September and a 1–1 draw with Athletic Bilbao at the Allianz Stadion on 8 December. On the domestic front in the Austrian Football Bundesliga, he recorded 8 goals in 33 games – including one to cap a 4–1 victory at city rivals Austria Wien on 7 August – but the Viennese club finished fifth out of ten teams, and missed out on European football.

On 22 July 2017, the first game of the new season, Joelinton was sent off after 23 minutes in a 2–2 home draw with SV Mattersburg, for kicking back after being fouled by Michael Novak.

==== Return ====
On his return to Hoffenheim, Joelinton was given a first start in a DFB-Pokal first-round match at 1. FC Kaiserslautern, and scored a hat-trick in a 6–1 victory. He netted his first Bundesliga goal on 22 September to open a 1–1 home draw with Borussia Dortmund, and as a substitute on 23 October he scored an added-time equaliser for a 3–3 draw against Lyon in a Champions League group game at the Rhein-Neckar-Arena.

=== Newcastle United ===
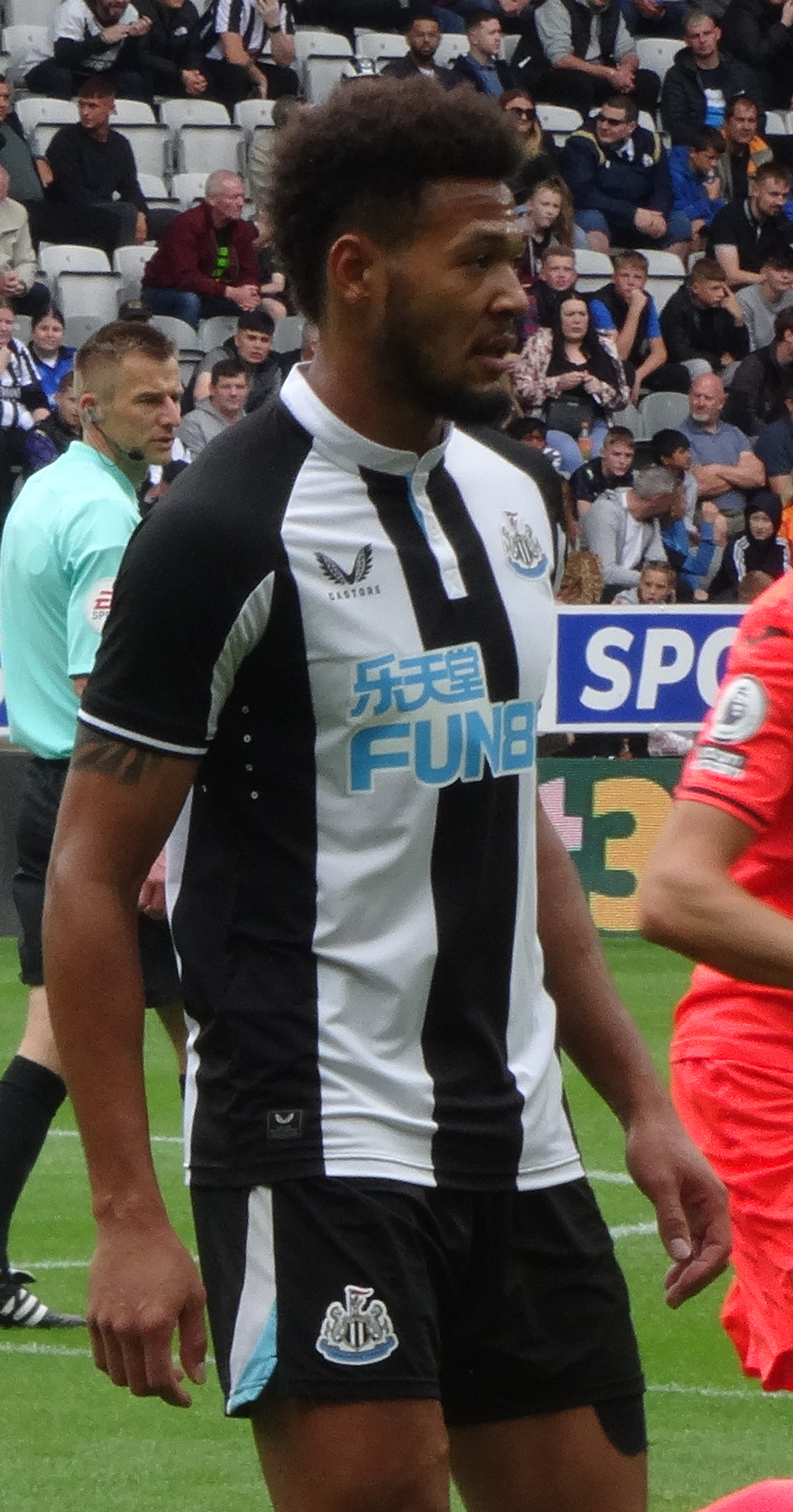
Joelinton playing for Newcastle United in 2021

On 23 July 2019, Joelinton joined Newcastle United on a six-year deal for a reported club record fee of £40 million. He made his debut on 11 August, starting in their 1–0 home loss to Arsenal; he and teammate Miguel Almirón were criticised by the club's all-time record scorer Alan Shearer for their performances.

Joelinton scored his first Premier League goal on 25 August in a 1–0 victory away at Tottenham Hotspur. It took him until 14 January 2020 to score his second goal for the club, netting the final goal in a 4–1 FA Cup third round replay victory over Rochdale. He scored his first home league goal on 21 June in a 3–0 win over Sheffield United, ending a 2,130-minute drought. Joelinton scored two goals in 38 appearances for the club, of which six came from the bench in the 2019–20 season. In the 2020–21 season he doubled his tally to four goals, which came from 31 appearances of which eight were from the bench.

After Eddie Howe took over as Newcastle United manager during the 2021–22 season, Joelinton was moved from a forward to a box-to-box central midfielder, receiving praise from fans and pundits for his efforts and performances. He was awarded the Newcastle United Player of the Year Award for the 2021–22 season.

On 11 April 2024, Joelinton signed a new long-term contract with Newcastle. On 17 March 2025, Joelinton started the 2–1 win in the 2025 EFL Cup final against Liverpool, his performance was described as "aggressive" and "intense".

== International career ==
Joelinton was capped four times by the Brazil national under-17 team in 2012, scoring two goals. On 28 May 2023, Joelinton received his first call-up to the senior team. He made his debut on 17 June, scoring the opening goal in a 4–1 win over Guinea.

== Personal life ==
Joelinton has been in a relationship with Thays Gondim since 2015, whom he married in May 2024. The couple have three children together, announcing their third in December 2022. In February 2023, Joelinton and Gondim held a gender reveal party on the pitch at St James’ Park. On 25 June, the couple announced the arrival of their second son.

Joelinton was arrested in the early hours of 12 January 2023 in Newcastle upon Tyne and charged with drunk-driving in his Mercedes G-Wagen. He pleaded guilty at Newcastle Magistrates Court two weeks later and received a 12-month driving ban, to be reduced to nine months in the event of rehabilitation. He was fined £29,000, in addition to a £2,000 surcharge and £85 costs.

Joelinton's home was broken into by three men in the later hours of 13 January 2024, while he was attending Newcastle United's home match over Manchester City.

== Career statistics ==
=== Club ===
As of match played 10 May 2026

Appearances and goals by club, season and competition
Club	Season	League			National cup (Note: Includes Copa do Brasil, DFB-Pokal, Austrian Cup, FA Cup)		League cup (Note: Includes EFL Cup)		Continental		Other		Total	
Club	Season	Division	Apps	Goals	Apps	Goals	Apps	Goals	Apps	Goals	Apps	Goals	Apps	Goals
Sport Recife	2014	Série A	7	2	1	0	—		—		1 (Note: Appearance in Copa do Nordeste)	0	9	2
Sport Recife	2015	Série A	5	1	5	1	—		—		20 (Note: Eleven appearances and two goals in Campeonato Pernambucano, nine appearances and one goal in Copa do Nordeste)	3	30	5
Sport Recife	Total		12	3	6	1	—		—		21	3	39	7
TSG Hoffenheim	2015–16	Bundesliga	1	0	0	0	—		—		—		1	0
TSG Hoffenheim	2018–19	Bundesliga	28	7	2	3	—		5 (Note: Appearances in UEFA Champions League)	1	—		35	11
TSG Hoffenheim	Total		29	7	2	3	—		5	1	—		36	11
Rapid Wien (loan)	2016–17	Austrian Bundesliga	33	8	5	3	—		10 (Note: Appearances in UEFA Europa League)	2	—		48	13
Rapid Wien (loan)	2017–18	Austrian Bundesliga	27	7	4	1	—		—		—		31	8
Rapid Wien (loan)	Total		60	15	9	4	—		10	2	—		79	21
Newcastle United	2019–20	Premier League	38	2	6	2	0	0	—		—		44	4
Newcastle United	2020–21	Premier League	31	4	1	0	4	2	—		—		36	6
Newcastle United	2021–22	Premier League	35	4	1	0	1	0	—		—		37	4
Newcastle United	2022–23	Premier League	32	6	1	0	7	2	—		—		40	8
Newcastle United	2023–24	Premier League	20	2	1	0	2	0	4	1	—		27	3
Newcastle United	2024–25	Premier League	29	4	2	0	6	0	—		—		37	4
Newcastle United	2025–26	Premier League	27	2	2	0	3	2	10	2	—		42	6
Newcastle United	Total		212	24	14	2	23	6	14	3	—		263	35
Career total			313	49	31	10	23	6	29	6	21	3	417	74

=== International ===
As of match played 14 October 2025

Appearances and goals by national team and year
National team	Year	Apps	Goals
Brazil	2023	5	1
Brazil	2024	0	0
Brazil	2025	3	0
Total		8	1

Scores and results list Brazil's goal tally first.

List of international goals scored by Joelinton
No.	Date	Venue	Cap	Opponent	Score	Result	Competition
1	17 June 2023	Estadi Cornellà-El Prat, Barcelona, Spain	1	Guinea	1–0	4–1	Friendly

== Honours ==
Sport Recife

- Campeonato Pernambucano: 2014
- Copa do Nordeste: 2014

Newcastle United

- EFL Cup: 2024–25; runner-up: 2022–23

Individual

- Newcastle United Player of the Year: 2021–22
