= Felipe Azevedo =

Brazilian footballer (born 1987)

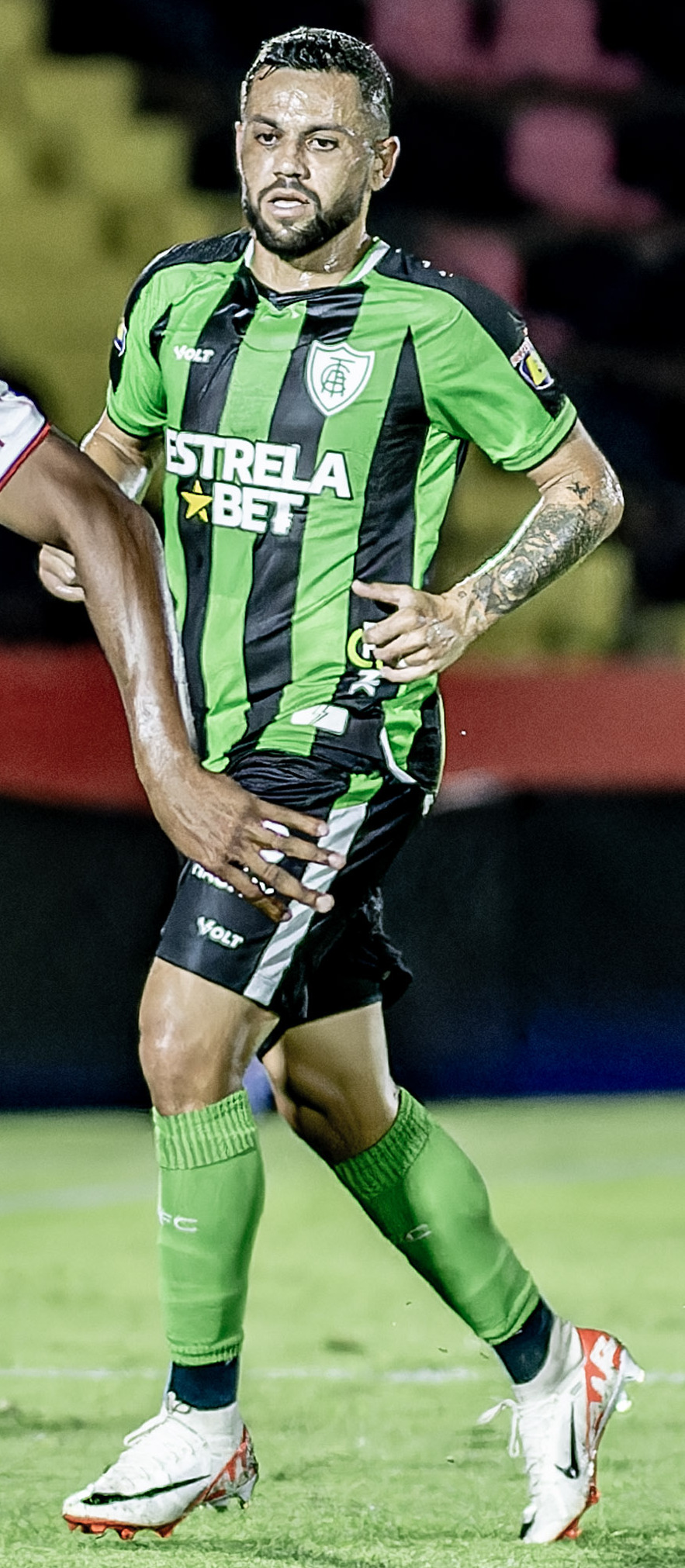

Personal information
- Full name: Felipe Azevedo dos Santos
- Date of birth: 10 January 1987 (age 39)
- Place of birth: Ubatuba, Brazil
- Height: 1.74 m (5 ft 8 1/2 in)
- Positions: Winger; striker

Team information
- Current team: Botafogo-PB

Senior career*
Years	Team	Apps	(Gls)
2006	América-SP		
2006–2007	XV de Piracicaba	11	(1)
2008	Ituano	11	(2)
2008	Juventude	6	(1)
2009–2012	Paulista	33	(7)
2009	→ Santos (loan)	16	(1)
2010	→ Petržalka (loan)	3	(1)
2010–2011	→ Busan I'Park (loan)	14	(3)
2011–2012	→ Ceará (loan)	53	(27)
2012–2015	Sport	149	(25)
2015	→ Ponte Preta (loan)	31	(4)
2016	Ponte Preta	34	(10)
2017	Chiangrai United	30	(18)
2018	Ceará	42	(3)
2019–2024	América Mineiro	229	(29)
2020	→ Água Santa (loan)	9	(1)
2025	São Bernardo	32	(3)
2026	Capivariano	9	(1)
2026–	Botafogo-PB	11	(3)
- * Club domestic league appearances and goals as of 8 November 2026

Felipe Azevedo dos Santos (born 10 January 1987) is a Brazilian footballer who plays for Botafogo-PB as an attacking midfielder.

== Honours ==
Sport Recife

- Copa do Nordeste: 2014

Chiangrai United

- Thai FA Cup: 2017
