= Léo Lisboa =

Brazilian footballer (born 1994)

Personal information
- Full name: Leonardo Santos Lisboa
- Date of birth: 1 June 1994 (age 32)
- Place of birth: Rio de Janeiro, Brazil
- Height: 1.75 m (5 ft 9 in)
- Position: Midfielder

Team information
- Current team: Bangu

Youth career
- 2008–2011: Flamengo
- 2011–2013: Figueirense

Senior career*
| Years | Team | Apps | (Gls) |
| 2012–2016 | Figueirense | 15 | (1) |
| 2016–2017 | Tombense | 3 | (0) |
| 2017 | → Marcílio Dias (loan) | | |
| 2017 | Resende | | |
| 2018– | Bangu | | |
| 2019 | → Real Noroeste (loan) | | |
| 2019 | → Bonsucesso (loan) | | |
- * Club domestic league appearances and goals as of 22:00, 4 January 2020 (UTC)

Leonardo Santos Lisboa (born 1 June 1994), known as Léo Lisboa, is a Brazilian footballer who plays for Bangu Atlético Clube as a midfielder.

== Career ==
Born in Rio de Janeiro, Léo Lisboa graduated with Figueirense's youth setup. On 25 November 2012, he made his first team – and Série A – debut, coming on as a second-half substitute in a 3–2 home loss against Grêmio. He subsequently returned to the youth setup, being promoted to the main squad in 2014.

On 3 August 2014, Léo Lisboa scored his first professional goal, netting the first in a 3–0 home win against Sport.

== Honours ==
- Campeonato Catarinense: 2014
