= Rodrigo Mancha =

Brazilian footballer

Personal information
- Full name: Rodrigo Marcos dos Santos
- Date of birth: 16 June 1986 (age 40)
- Place of birth: Curitiba, Brazil
- Height: 1.89 m (6 ft 2 in)
- Position: Defensive midfielder

Youth career
- Coritiba

Senior career*
Years	Team	Apps	(Gls)
2005–2009	Coritiba	34	(2)
2009–2011	Santos	20	(0)
2010	→ Grêmio Prudente (loan)	23	(0)
2011	→ Botafogo (loan)	0	(0)
2011	→ Vitória (loan)	9	(0)
2012–2013	Vitória	19	(0)
2013	Oita Trinita	29	(0)
2014–2017	Sport	33	(1)
2017	Fortaleza	15	(0)
- * Club domestic league appearances and goals

Rodrigo Marcos dos Santos, better known as Rodrigo Mancha (born 16 June 1986) is a Brazilian former professional footballer, who played as a defensive midfielder

== Career ==
Born in Curitiba, Rodrigo Mancha started his career in the youth of Coritiba, where he played about 90 matches. Regarded as one of the biggest revelations of the team, was sought by several other teams, and in July 2009, was traded to the Saints Football Club. After the game against Gremio Cup semifinals by Brazil, where the Saints won 2–0 Fc to the entrance of Rodrigo Mancha in the field, with two errors that followed enabled the Guild to tie the game, the player was away and on 27 May 2010 loan was negotiated by the Grêmio Prudente. In January 2011, he moved on loan to Botafogo and on 25 May 2011 joined Vitória on loan.

He left Fortaleza in 2017.

== Career statistics ==
(Correct as of 24 November 2023)

Appearances and goals by club, season and competition
Club	Season	State League		National League		National cup		Continental		Other		Total	
Club	Season	Apps	Goals	Apps	Goals	Apps	Goals	Apps	Goals	Apps	Goals	Apps	Goals
Coritiba	2005	–		6	0	–		–		–		6	0
Coritiba	2006	–		9	2	2	0	–		–		11	2
Coritiba	2007	–		11	0	2	0	–		–		13	0
Coritiba	2008	1	0	31	2	1	0	–		–		33	2
Coritiba	2009	14	0	3	0	9	0	–		–		26	0
Santos	2009	–		19	0	–		–		–		19	0
Santos	2010	16	0	1	0	4	0	–		–		21	0
Grêmio Prudente (loan)	2010	–		23	0	–		2	0	–		25	0
Botafogo (loan)	2011	6	1	–		–		–		–		6	1
Vitória (loan)	2011	–		9	0	–		–		–		9	0
Vitória (loan)	2012	13	0	19	0	5	0	–		–		37	0
Vitória (loan)	2013	–		–		–		–		7	0	7	0
Oita Trinita	2013	–		29	0	4	0	–		2	0	35	0
Sport Recife	2014	14	1	17	1	–		–		9	0	40	2
Sport Recife	2015	9	0	16	0	5	0	1	0	9	0	40	0
Sport Recife	2016	0	0	14	0	–		–		–		14	0
Fortaleza	2017	4	0	15	0	–		–		1	0	20	0
São Joseense	2019	14	0	–		–		–		–		14	0
Araucária	2020	11	1	–		–		–		–		11	1
Total		102	3	222	5	32	0	3	0	28	0	387	8

== Honours ==
Coritiba

- Campeonato Brasileiro Série B: 2007
- Campeonato Paranaense: 2008

Santos

- Campeonato Paulista: 2010

Sport Recife

- Copa do Nordeste: 2014
