= Mike (Brazilian footballer) =

Brazilian footballer (born 1993)

Personal information
- Full name: Mike dos Santos Nenatarvicius
- Date of birth: 8 March 1993 (age 33)
- Place of birth: Suzano, Brazil
- Height: 1.75 m (5 ft 9 in)
- Position: Forward

Team information
- Current team: Retrô
- Number: 14

Youth career
- 2007–2011: Paulista

Senior career*
| Years | Team | Apps | (Gls) |
| 2010–2011 | Paulista | 2 | (0) |
| 2012–2017 | Internacional | 14 | (1) |
| 2014 | → Botafogo-SP (loan) | 13 | (5) |
| 2014–2015 | → Sport Recife (loan) | 31 | (4) |
| 2016 | → Audax (loan) | 19 | (4) |
| 2016 | → Oeste (loan) | 15 | (1) |
| 2017 | → América Mineiro (loan) | 18 | (2) |
| 2018 | Paysandu | 48 | (10) |
| 2019 | Atlético Goianiense | 54 | (18) |
| 2020 | Goiás | 15 | (2) |
| 2020–2021 | Chapecoense | 66 | (12) |
| 2022 | Gwangju FC | 25 | (4) |
| 2023–2024 | CRB | 84 | (5) |
| 2025 | Água Santa | 5 | (0) |
| 2025– | Retrô | 1 | (0) |
- * Club domestic league appearances and goals as of 19:02, 4 April 2022 (UTC)

Mike dos Santos Nenatarvicius (born 8 March 1993), simply known as Mike, is a Brazilian footballer who plays as a forward for Retrô.

== Honours ==
Paulista

- Copa Paulista: 2010, 2011

Internacional

- Campeonato Gaúcho: 2012, 2013

América Mineiro

- Campeonato Brasileiro Série B: 2017

Paysandu

- Copa Verde: 2018

Atlético Goianiense

- Campeonato Goiano: 2019

Chapecoense

- Campeonato Brasileiro Série B: 2020

CRB

- Campeonato Alagoano: 2024
