= Neto Baiano =

Brazilian footballer (born 1982)

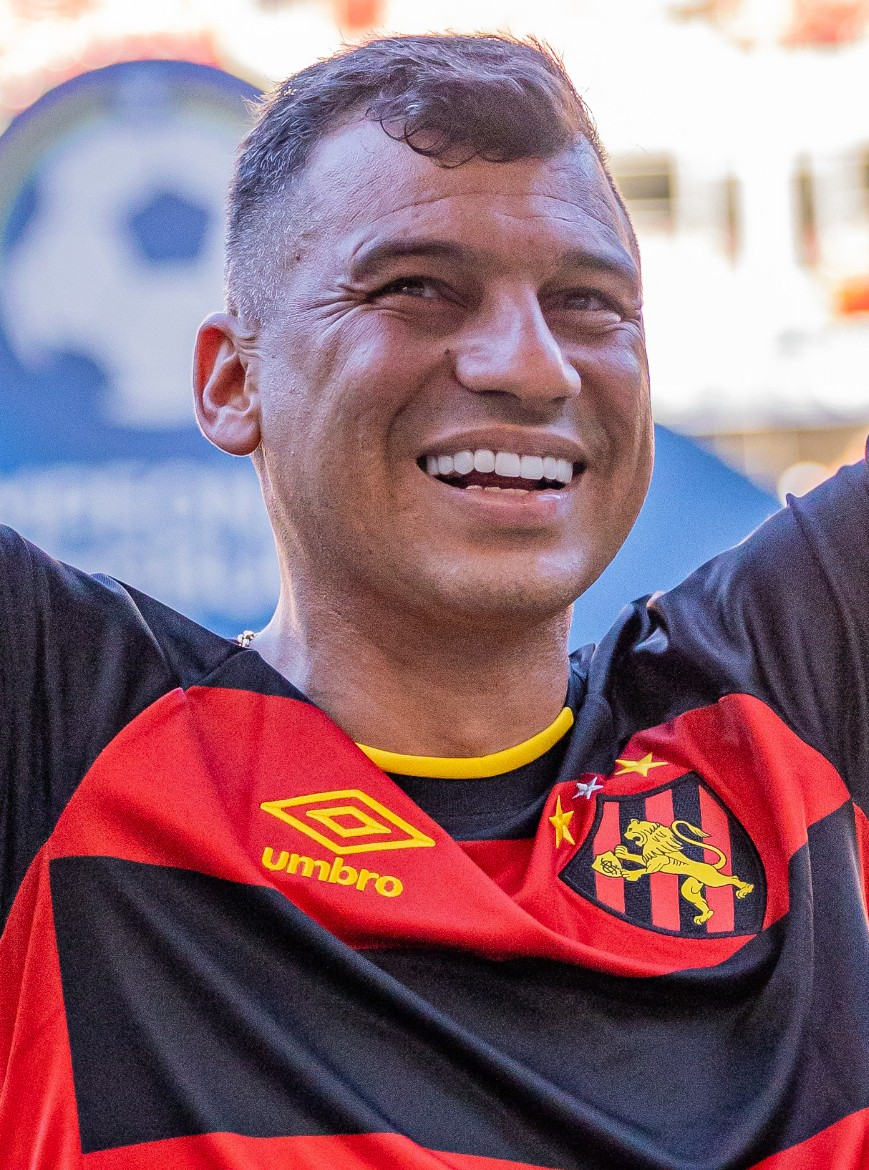
- Neto Baiano in 2024

Personal information
- Full name: Euvaldo José de Aguiar Neto
- Date of birth: September 17, 1982 (age 44)
- Place of birth: Salvador, Bahia, Brazil
- Height: 1.87 m (6 ft 2 in)
- Position: Forward

Team information
- Current team: Brasiliense

Youth career
- 2000: Mirassol
- 2001: Corinthians (AL)
- 2002: Mirassol

Senior career*
| Years | Team | Apps | (Gls) |
| 2003 | São Caetano | | |
| 2004 | Becamex Bình Dương | 9 | (6) |
| 2004 | Internacional | | |
| 2005 | Mogi Mirim | | |
| 2005 | Jeonbuk Hyundai | 20 | (6) |
| 2006 | Paulista | | |
| 2006 | Palmeiras | 4 | (1) |
| 2006 | Fortaleza | 1 | (0) |
| 2006–2007 | Atlético Paranaense | | |
| 2007 | Paulista | 2 | (0) |
| 2007 | Fortaleza | | |
| 2008 | Ipatinga | 10 | (1) |
| 2008 | Ponte Preta | 10 | (2) |
| 2009–2012 | Vitória | 47 | (22) |
| 2009–2010 | → JEF United Chiba (loan) | 43 | (14) |
| 2012 | Kashiwa Reysol | 11 | (1) |
| 2013 | Goiás | 13 | (0) |
| 2013 | → Sport (loan) | 13 | (7) |
| 2014 | Sport | 25 | (4) |
| 2015–2016 | Vitória | 7 | (3) |
| 2015–2016 | → Criciúma (loan) | 23 | (3) |
| 2016–2019 | CRB | 85 | (20) |
| 2019 | Vitória | 8 | (1) |
| 2019 | Remo | 4 | (0) |
| 2020– | Brasiliense | 0 | (0) |
- * Club domestic league appearances and goals as of 21:51, 31 March 2020 (UTC)

Euvaldo José de Aguiar Neto (born September 17, 1982, in Salvador, Bahia), known as Neto Baiano, is a Brazilian footballer who plays for Brasiliense FC as a forward.

His previous clubs include Paulista, Sport Recife, Fortaleza, Atlético-PR, Palmeiras, Jeonbuk Hyundai in South Korea, Mogi Mirim, Internacional, Becamex Bình Dương in Vietnam, São Caetano, Corinthians-AL, Mirassol, Vitória and JEF United Chiba, Kashiwa Reysol in Japan.

== Honours ==
Internacional

- Campeonato Gaúcho: 2004

Vitoria

- Campeonato Baiano: 2009

Goiás

- Campeonato Goiano: 2013

Sport Recife

- Copa do Nordeste: 2014
- Campeonato Pernambucano: 2014

CRB

- Campeonato Alagoano: 2016, 2017
