= Danilo Barcelos =

Brazilian footballer (born 1991)

Personal information
- Full name: Danilo Carvalho Barcelos
- Date of birth: 17 August 1991 (age 35)
- Place of birth: Coronel Fabriciano, Brazil
- Height: 1.86 m (6 ft 1 in)
- Positions: Left back; midfielder

Team information
- Current team: Ponte Preta
- Number: 14

Youth career
- 2002–2007: USIPA
- 2009: Cruzeiro
- 2010: Bahia
- 2011: América Mineiro

Senior career*
Years	Team	Apps	(Gls)
2011–2016	América Mineiro	79	(9)
2011	→ Francana (loan)	0	(0)
2012	→ Poços de Caldas (loan)	9	(2)
2012–2013	→ Anápolis (loan)	26	(2)
2014–2015	→ Sport Recife (loan)	51	(6)
2017–2020	Atlético Mineiro	23	(4)
2017	→ Ponte Preta (loan)	24	(6)
2018	→ Ponte Preta (loan)	32	(3)
2019	→ Vasco da Gama (loan)	42	(5)
2020	Botafogo	12	(1)
2020–2023	Fluminense	41	(1)
2022	→ Goiás (loan)	31	(0)
2023	Ceará	31	(1)
2024	Novorizontino	29	(1)
2025–	Ponte Preta	41	(3)
- * Club domestic league appearances and goals as of 18 November 2026

Danilo Carvalho Barcelos (born 17 August 1991), known as Danilo Barcelos, is a Brazilian footballer who plays for Ponte Preta. As either a left back or a midfielder.

== Club career ==
Danilo was born in Coronel Fabriciano, Minas Gerais. An América Mineiro youth graduate, he made his senior debut while on loan at Francana in 2011; subsequent loans followed, at Poços de Caldas and Anápolis.

Danilo returned to Coelho in 2013, and made his first team debut on 25 May 2013 by starting and being sent off in a 0–1 away loss against Guaratinguetá for the Série B championship. He finished the campaign with 35 appearances and one goal, against Bragantino on 6 October.

On 10 February 2014, Danilo was loaned to Série A club Sport Recife until the end of the year. He made his debut in the competition on 27 April, coming on as a second-half substitute for Renan Oliveira in a 2–1 home win against Chapecoense.

Danilo scored his first goal in the main category of Brazilian football on 31 August 2014, netting the last in a 2–0 home win against Criciúma. He only returned to América in 2016, with the club in the top tier.

Danilo played 51 games and scored ten goals for América during the 2016 season, three of them in the finals of the 2016 Campeonato Mineiro, against Atlético Mineiro, playing a key role in the club's first state league trophy in 15 years. On 21 December of that year, however, he was announced as new player of Atlético Mineiro for the upcoming season.

After failing to make his breakthrough at Galo, Danilo subsequently served loans at Ponte Preta (two stints) and Vasco da Gama.

On 9 March 2022, Barcelos joined Goiás on loan until the end of 2022.

== Honours ==
Anápolis

- Campeonato Goiano Second Division: 2012

Sport

- Copa do Nordeste: 2014
- Campeonato Pernambucano: 2014

América Mineiro

- Campeonato Mineiro: 2016

Atlético Mineiro

- Campeonato Mineiro: 2017

Vasco da Gama

- Taça Guanabara: 2019

Ceará

- Copa do Nordeste: 2023
