= Válber (footballer, born 1981) =

Brazilian footballer

Personal information
- Full name: Válber Mendes Ferreira
- Date of birth: September 22, 1981 (age 45)
- Place of birth: São Luís, Brazil
- Height: 1.73 m (5 ft 8 in)
- Position: Attacking midfielder

Youth career
- 1997–1999: Expressinho-MA

Senior career*
Years	Team	Apps	(Gls)
1999–2000	ASA		
2001	Santa Cruz		
2002–2003	La Louviere		
2003–2004	Santa Cruz		
2004	Sampaio Corrêa		
2005	Goiás		
2006	Moto Club		
2006–2007	Atlético-PR	22	(2)
2008–2011	Avaí	28	(6)
2009–2010	→ Daejeon Citizen (loan)	25	(1)
2011	→ Ponte Preta (loan)	4	(0)
2011	→ Americana (loan)	22	(6)
2012	Red Bull Brasil		
2012	Criciúma	24	(2)
2013	Ceará		
2014	Brasiliense		
2014	CRB		
2015	Sampaio Corrêa		
2016	Paraná		
- * Club domestic league appearances and goals

Válber Mendes Ferreira or simply Válber (born September 22, 1981, in São Luís), is a Brazilian attacking midfielder.

== Honours ==
- Alagoas State League: 2000
- Belgian Cup: 2002, 2003
