= 2014 Copa do Nordeste =

Nordestão

Tournament details
- Country: Brazil
- Dates: 17 January – 9 April
- Teams: 16

Final positions
- Champions: Sport
- Runners-up: Ceará
- 2014 Copa Sudamericana: Sport

Tournament statistics
- Matches played: 62
- Goals scored: 152 (2.45 per match)
- Attendance: 374,107 (6,034 per match)
- Top goal scorer(s): Magno Alves (8 goals)

Awards
- Best player: (Brazil) Neto Baiano (Sport)

The 2014 Copa do Nordeste was the 11th edition of the main football tournament featuring teams from the Brazilian Nordeste. The competition featured 16 clubs, with Bahia and Pernambuco having three seeds each, and Ceará, Rio Grande do Norte, Sergipe, Alagoas and Paraíba with two seeds each. The 2014 Copa do Nordeste did not feature teams from the states of Maranhão and Piauí, though they are slated to enter the tournament in its 2015 edition. The champions, Sport Recife, earned a berth in the 2014 Copa Sudamericana.

== Qualified teams ==
Association	Team (Berth)	Entry stage
(Alagoas) Alagoas; 2 berths	CRB	2013 Campeonato Alagoano champions
(Alagoas) Alagoas; 2 berths	CSA	2013 Campeonato Alagoano runners-up
(Bahia) Bahia; 3 berths	Vitória	2013 Campeonato Baiano champions
(Bahia) Bahia; 3 berths	Bahia	2013 Campeonato Baiano runners-up
(Bahia) Bahia; 3 berths	Vitória da Conquista	2013 Campeonato Baiano champions of the first phase
(Ceará) Ceará; 2 berths	Ceará	2013 Campeonato Cearense champions
(Ceará) Ceará; 2 berths	Guarany	2013 Campeonato Cearense runners-up
(Paraíba) Paraíba; 2 berths	Botafogo	2013 Campeonato Paraibano champions
(Paraíba) Paraíba; 2 berths	Treze	2013 Campeonato Paraibano runners-up
(Pernambuco) Pernambuco; 3 berths	Santa Cruz	2013 Campeonato Pernambucano champions
(Pernambuco) Pernambuco; 3 berths	Sport	2013 Campeonato Pernambucano runners-up
(Pernambuco) Pernambuco; 3 berths	Náutico	2013 Campeonato Pernambucano 3rd place
(Rio Grande do Norte) Rio Grande do Norte; 2 berths	Potiguar	2013 Campeonato Potiguar champions
(Rio Grande do Norte) Rio Grande do Norte; 2 berths	América	2013 Campeonato Potiguar runners-up
(Sergipe) Sergipe; 2 berths	Sergipe	2013 Campeonato Sergipano champions
(Sergipe) Sergipe; 2 berths	Confiança^{[A]}	2013 Campeonato Sergipano third place

A. River Plate was originally qualified as runners-up of the 2013 Campeonato Sergipano. Because of their request to be absent for 2 two years of the Campeonato Sergiano due to financial problems, Confiança earned their spot.

== Group stage ==
=== Group A ===
Team	Pld	W	D	L	GF	GA	GD	Pts	AME	VIT	SER	CON
América	6	3	3	0	10	2	+8	12		0–0	3–0	2–0
Vitória	6	3	2	1	12	8	+4	11	0–3		5–1	2–1
Sergipe	6	1	3	2	8	14	−6	6	1–1	2–2		2–1
Confiança	6	0	2	4	6	12	−6	2	1–1	1–3	2–2	

=== Group B ===
Team	Pld	W	D	L	GF	GA	GD	Pts	CSA	STC	BAH	VCO
CSA	6	3	2	1	10	6	+4	11		1–1	4–1	2–1
Santa Cruz	6	3	2	1	8	6	+2	11	0–1		2–1	3–2
Bahia	6	3	1	2	7	8	−1	10	1–0	1–1		1–0
Vitória da Conquista	6	0	1	5	6	11	−5	1	2–2	0–1	1–2	

=== Group C ===
Team	Pld	W	D	L	GF	GA	GD	Pts	CEA	CRB	POT	TRZ
Ceará	6	3	2	1	10	4	+6	11		5–0	1–1	2–0
CRB	6	3	1	2	7	10	−3	10	2–0		1–1	2–1
Potiguar	6	2	3	1	8	7	+1	9	1–1	1–2		2–1
Treze	6	1	0	5	5	9	−4	3	0–1	2–0	1–2	

=== Group D ===
Team	Pld	W	D	L	GF	GA	GD	Pts	GUA	SPO	NAU	BOT
Guarany	6	2	3	1	5	4	+1	9		1–0	1–1	2–1
Sport	6	2	2	2	5	3	+2	8	0–0		0–1	1–0
Náutico	6	1	3	2	4	7	−3	6	1–1	0–3		0–1
Botafogo	6	2	2	2	5	5	0	4 (Note: Botafogo deducted four points for fielding an ineligible player.)	1–0	1–1 (Note: Botafogo fielded an ineligible player.)	1–1	

== Knockout phase ==
=== Bracket ===
Quarter-finals
América	0	4	4
CRB	2	0	2
Ceará	1	5	6
Vitória	1	1	2
CSA	0	1	1
Sport	2	0	2
Guarany	0	0	0
Santa Cruz	3	1	4

Semi-finals
América	0	2	2
Ceará	4	0	4
Sport	2	2	4
Santa Cruz	0	1	1

Finals
Ceará	0	1	1
Sport	2	1	3

=== Quarterfinals ===
Team 1	Agg.	Team 2	1st leg	2nd leg
Santa Cruz (Pernambuco)	4–0	(Ceará) Guarany	3–0	1–0
CRB (Alagoas)	2–4	(Rio Grande do Norte) América	2–0	0–4
Sport (Pernambuco)	2–1	(Alagoas) CSA	2–0	0–1
Vitória (Bahia)	2–6	Ceará	1–1	1–5

=== Semifinals ===
Team 1	Agg.	Team 2	1st leg	2nd leg
Ceará	4–2	(Rio Grande do Norte) América	4–0	0–2
Sport (Pernambuco)	4–1	(Pernambuco) Santa Cruz	2–0	2–1

=== Finals ===
2 April 2014
22:00 UTC−3

Sport	2–0	Ceará
Neto Baiano 11'; Danilo 85'	Report

Ilha do Retiro, Recife
Attendance: 25,545
Referee: Cláudio Francisco Lima e Silva

9 April 2014
22:00 UTC−3

Ceará	1–1	Sport
Magno Alves 42'	Report	Neto Baiano 51' (pen.)

Castelão, Fortaleza
Attendance: 60,068
Referee: Jailson Macedo Freitas

2014 Copa do Nordeste
champions

3rd title

== Top scorers ==
Rank	Player	Club	Goals
1	(Brazil) Magno Alves	Ceará	8
2	(Brazil) Neto Baiano	Sport	6
3	(Brazil) Bill	Ceará	4
3	(Brazil) Denilson	CRB	4
3	(Brazil) Josimar	CSA	4
