= 2013 Santos FC season =

Santos
2013 season
- President: Luis Álvaro de Oliveira Ribeiro
- Coach: Muricy Ramalho (until 31 May); Claudinei Oliveira
- Stadium: Vila Belmiro
- Campeonato Brasileiro: 7th
- Campeonato Paulista: Runners-up
- Copa do Brasil: Round of 16
- Top goalscorer: League: Cícero (15); All: Cícero (24)
- Highest home attendance: 63,501 vs Flamengo (26 May)
- Lowest home attendance: 3,436 vs Mirassol (21 March)
Home colours	Away colours	Third colours

The 2013 season is Santos FC's 101st season in existence and the club's fifty-fourth consecutive season in the top flight of Brazilian football.

Santos reached the Campeonato Paulista Finals for fifth consecutive season, but failed to win their fourth consecutive title as they lost by 2–3 on aggregate for their biggest rival, Corinthians. On 25 May 2013, Santos announced that they had sold Neymar to Barcelona for a fee of € 57 million. A week later, the club sacked the head coach Muricy Ramalho due to the discontent of the crowd and the club's directors with his results. For his place, Claudinei Oliveira assumed as caretaker. As part of Neymar's sold to Barcelona, Santos played in the Joan Gamper Torphy against them and suffered their third worst defeat in history, losing by 8–0. In the Copa do Brasil, Santos were eliminated in the Round of 16, losing 1–2 on aggregate score to Grêmio. On 30 August, Claudinei Oliveira was promoted to head coach after 3 months as caretaker.

== Players ==
=== Squad information ===
Name	Pos.	Nat.	Place of birth	Date of birth (age)	Club caps	Club goals	Int. caps	Int. goals	Signed from	Date signed	Fee	Contract End
Goalkeepers
Aranha	GK	(Brazil)	Pouso Alegre (Minas Gerais)	17 November 1980 (aged 34)	67	0	–	–	Atlético Mineiro	21 December 2010	Undisc.	31 December 2015
Gabriel Gasparotto	GK	(Brazil)	Lucélia (São Paulo (state))	9 December 1993 (aged 20)	0	0	–	–	Youth System	9 February 2013	Free	31 December 2016
Vladimir	GK	(Brazil)	Ipiaú (Bahia)	16 July 1989 (aged 25)	8	0	–	–	Youth System	1 January 2009	Free	31 December 2014
Defenders
Durval	CB/LB	(Brazil)	Cruz do Esp. Santo (Paraíba)	11 July 1980 (aged 34)	249	7	1	0	Sport	1 January 2010	Undisc.	31 December 2013
Edu Dracena	CB	(Brazil)	Dracena (São Paulo (state))	18 May 1981 (aged 33)	205	17	2	0	Fenerbahçe (Turkey)	16 September 2009	Free	31 December 2015
Gustavo Henrique	CB	(Brazil)	São Paulo (São Paulo (state))	24 March 1993 (aged 21)	30	3	–	–	Youth System	10 January 2013	Free	31 December 2016
Jubal	CB	(Brazil)	Inhumas (Goiás)	29 August 1993 (aged 21)	2	0	–	–	Youth System	5 March 2013	Free	31 December 2017
Neto	CB	(Brazil)	Rio de Janeiro (Rio de Janeiro (state))	16 August 1985 (aged 29)	12	0	–	–	Guarani	8 November 2012	€0,2M	31 December 2014
Rafael Caldeira	CB	(Brazil)	Monte Alto (São Paulo (state))	11 February 1991 (aged 23)	4	1	–	–	Youth System	17 April 2009	Free	31 December 2014
Walace	CB	(Brazil)	São Paulo (São Paulo (state))	25 May 1993 (aged 21)	1	0	–	–	Youth System	3 June 2013	Free	31 December 2014
Bruno Peres	RB	(Brazil)	São Paulo (São Paulo (state))	1 March 1990 (aged 24)	59	3	–	–	Audax SP	18 January 2013	Undisc.	31 December 2016
Cicinho	RB/RW	(Brazil)	Belém (Pará)	26 December 1988 (aged 25)	26	2	–	–	Ponte Preta	26 June 2013	R$7M	31 December 2018
Douglas	RB	(Brazil)	Iúna (Espírito Santo)	23 June 1993 (aged 21)	3	0	–	–	Youth System	1 January 2012	Free	31 December 2013
Emerson Palmieri	LB	(Italy)	Santos (São Paulo (state))	13 March 1994 (aged 20)	23	1	–	–	Youth System	17 June 2012	Free	30 September 2014
Mena	LB	(Chile)	Viña del Mar	18 July 1988 (aged 26)	24	0	22	3	Univ. de Chile	27 June 2013	Loan	30 June 2014
Rafael Galhardo	RB/LB	(Brazil)	Nova Friburgo (Rio de Janeiro (state))	30 October 1991 (aged 23)	28	2	–	–	Flamengo	18 May 2012	Swap	31 December 2016
Midfielders
Alan Santos	DM	(Brazil)	Salvador (Bahia)	24 April 1991 (aged 23)	39	0	–	–	Youth System	26 June 2009	Free	31 December 2015
Alison	DM	(Brazil)	Cubatão (São Paulo (state))	1 March 1993 (aged 21)	30	0	–	–	Youth System	9 September 2011	Free	31 December 2017
Arouca	DM/CM	(Brazil)	Duas Barras (Rio de Janeiro (state))	11 August 1986 (aged 28)	211	2	4	0	São Paulo	23 July 2010	€3,5M	31 December 2016
Lucas Otávio	DM	(Brazil)	Bandeirantes (Paraná (state))	9 October 1994 (aged 20)	1	0	–	–	Youth System	26 April 2012	Free	30 April 2015
Marcos Assunção	CM	(Brazil)	Caieiras (São Paulo (state))	25 July 1976 (aged 38)	123	24	11	1	Palmeiras	11 January 2013	Free	31 December 2013
Misael	DM	(Brazil)	Três de Maio (Rio Grande do Sul)	15 July 1994 (aged 20)	0	0	–	–	Grêmio	19 July 2013	Loan^{1}	31 December 2015
Renê Júnior	DM	(Brazil)	Rio de Janeiro (Rio de Janeiro (state))	16 September 1989 (aged 25)	38	0	–	–	Ponte Preta	2 January 2013	Loan^{1}	31 December 2013
Cícero	CM/AM	(Brazil)	Castelo (Espírito Santo)	26 August 1984 (aged 30)	68	24	–	–	São Paulo	1 January 2013	Loan^{1}	31 December 2014
Leandrinho	CM/AM	(Brazil)	Espinosa (Minas Gerais)	25 September 1993 (aged 21)	28	1	–	–	Youth System	16 August 2013	Free	31 December 2017
Léo	LM/LB	(Brazil)	Campos (Rio de Janeiro (state))	6 July 1975 (aged 39)	454	24	7	0	Benfica (Portugal)	14 January 2009	Free	31 December 2013
Léo Cittadini	AM	(Brazil)	Rio Claro (São Paulo (state))	27 February 1994 (aged 20)	6	1	–	–	Youth System	3 June 2013	Free	31 December 2018
Montillo	AM/SS	(Argentina)	Lanús	14 April 1984 (aged 30)	51	8	6	0	Cruzeiro	3 January 2013	€6M	31 December 2015
Pedro Castro	AM	(Brazil)	Volta Redonda (Rio de Janeiro (state))	5 February 1993 (aged 21)	13	0	–	–	Youth System	5 March 2013	Free	31 May 2016
Renato Abreu	AM	(Brazil)	São Paulo (São Paulo (state))	9 June 1978 (aged 36)	9	1	–	–	Flamengo	15 August 2013	Free	31 December 2013
Forwards
Everton Costa	SS	(Brazil)	Ponta Grossa (Paraná (state))	6 January 1986 (aged 28)	17	2	–	–	Coritiba	20 August 2013	Free	31 December 2013
Gabriel	SS/ST	(Brazil)	São Bernardo (São Paulo (state))	30 August 1996 (aged 18)	15	2	–	–	Youth System	24 May 2013	Free	24 September 2015
Geuvânio	SS	(Brazil)	Ilha das Flores (Sergipe)	5 April 1992 (aged 22)	12	0	–	–	Youth System	1 January 2012	Free	31 December 2015
Giva	ST	(Brazil)	Cachoeira (Espírito Santo)	3 January 1993 (aged 21)	26	6	–	–	Youth System	22 February 2013	Free	31 December 2014
Neílton	SS	(Brazil)	Nanuque (Minas Gerais)	17 February 1994 (aged 20)	20	4	–	–	Youth System	20 March 2013	Free	30 May 2014
Thiago Ribeiro	ST	(Brazil)	Pontes Gestal (São Paulo (state))	24 February 1986 (aged 28)	27	7	–	–	Cagliari (Italy)	20 July 2013	€3,5M	31 December 2017
Victor Andrade	SS	(Brazil)	Carmópolis (Sergipe)	30 September 1995 (aged 19)	27	3	–	–	Youth System	5 June 2012	Free	30 September 2014
Willian José	ST	(Brazil)	Porto Calvo (Alagoas)	23 November 1991 (aged 23)	26	5	–	–	Grêmio	25 May 2013	Loan^{1}	31 December 2014

^{1} Player has his rights assigned to another club where he has never played for (such as Tombense, Deportivo Maldonado and Mirassol).
Last updated: 8 December 2013
Source: Santos FC for appearances and goals.

=== Reserve players ===
Note: Flags indicate national team as defined under FIFA eligibility rules; some limited exceptions apply. Players may hold more than one non-FIFA nationality.

No.	Pos.	Nation	Player
—	MF	BRA	Anderson Carvalho
—	MF	VEN	Breitner

=== Joan Gamper Trophy squad ===
Note: Flags indicate national team as defined under FIFA eligibility rules; some limited exceptions apply. Players may hold more than one non-FIFA nationality.

No.	Pos.	Nation	Player
—	GK	BRA	Aranha
—	GK	BRA	Vladimir
—	DF	BRA	Cicinho
—	DF	BRA	Léo
—	DF	CHI	Mena
—	DF	BRA	Rafael Galhardo
—	DF	BRA	Durval
—	DF	BRA	Edu Dracena
—	DF	BRA	Gustavo Henrique
—	MF	BRA	Alan Santos
—	MF	BRA	Arouca

No.	Pos.	Nation	Player
—	MF	BRA	Cícero
—	MF	BRA	Leandrinho
—	MF	BRA	Léo Cittadini
—	MF	ARG	Walter Montillo
—	MF	BRA	Pedro Castro
—	FW	BRA	Gabriel
—	FW	BRA	Giva
—	FW	BRA	Neílton
—	FW	BRA	Thiago Ribeiro
—	FW	BRA	Victor Andrade
—	FW	BRA	Willian José

=== Appearances and goals ===
Pos.	Nat	Name	Campeonato Brasileiro		Campeonato Paulista		Copa do Brasil		Total	
Pos.	Nat	Name	Apps	Goals	Apps	Goals	Apps	Goals	Apps	Goals
GK	(Brazil)	Aranha	31	0	0	0	4	0	35	0
GK	(Brazil)	Gabriel Gasparotto	0	0	0	0	0	0	0	0
GK	(Brazil)	Vladimir	1	0	0	0	0	0	1	0
DF	(Brazil)	Bruno Peres	6(5)	1	17(1)	0	1(1)	0	31	1
DF	(Brazil)	Cicinho	22(3)	2	0	0	0	0	25	2
DF	(Brazil)	Douglas	0	0	0	0	0	0	0	0
DF	(Brazil)	Emerson Palmieri	8(6)	1	2	0	1	0	17	1
DF	(Chile)	Mena	19(1)	0	0	0	3	0	23	0
DF	(Brazil)	Rafael Galhardo	11(1)	0	3	0	6	1	21	1
DF	(Brazil)	Durval	19(1)	0	22	1	8	1	50	2
DF	(Brazil)	Edu Dracena (c)	33	2	15	1	5	0	53	3
DF	(Brazil)	Gustavo Henrique	24	2	0	0	3	1	27	3
DF	(Brazil)	Jubal	0	0	1	0	0	0	1	0
DF	(Brazil)	Neto	0	0	8(1)	0	1(1)	0	11	0
MF	(Brazil)	Alan Santos	7(13)	0	5(1)	0	2(3)	0	31	0
MF	(Brazil)	Alison	25(1)	0	0	0	3	0	29	0
MF	(Brazil)	Arouca	25(1)	0	18	0	4	0	48	0
MF	(Brazil)	Lucas Otávio	0	0	0	0	0(1)	0	1	0
MF	(Brazil)	Marcos Assunção	2(2)	0	4(2)	0	1(1)	0	12	0
MF	(Brazil)	Renato Abreu	3(6)	1	0	0	0	0	9	1
MF	(Brazil)	Renê Júnior	9(4)	0	19	0	5	0	37	0
MF	(Brazil)	Cícero	37	15	22	9	7	0	66	24
MF	(Brazil)	Leandrinho	14(7)	0	0	0	2(1)	1	24	1
MF	(Brazil)	Léo	11(3)	1	12	0	4	0	30	1
MF	(Brazil)	Léo Cittadini	1(2)	0	0	0	0(2)	1	5	1
MF	(Argentina)	Montillo	26	5	18	2	5	1	49	8
MF	(Brazil)	Pedro Castro	2(8)	0	0	0	1	0	11	0
FW	(Brazil)	Everton Costa	10(7)	2	0	0	0(1)	0	18	2
FW	(Brazil)	Gabriel	3(8)	1	0	0	1(1)	1	13	2
FW	(Brazil)	Geuvânio	6(1)	0	0	0	0	0	7	0
FW	(Brazil)	Giva	3(10)	2	8(2)	3	2(2)	1	27	6
FW	(Brazil)	Neílton	10(4)	4	1(1)	0	3	0	19	4
FW	(Brazil)	Thiago Ribeiro	21(3)	7	0	0	2	0	26	7
FW	(Brazil)	Victor Andrade	0(3)	0	0(3)	0	0	0	6	0
FW	(Brazil)	Willian José	18(5)	5	0	0	1(1)	0	25	5
Players who left the club during the season
MF	(Brazil)	Adriano	0	0	1	0	0	0	1	0
MF	(Brazil)	Pinga	0	0	0(4)	0	0	0	4	0
FW	(Brazil)	André	0	0	13(7)	6	0(2)	0	22	6
FW	(Brazil)	Neymar	1	0	18	12	4	1	23	13
MF	(Brazil)	Felipe Anderson	1(2)	0	4(11)	0	2(1)	0	21	0
DF	(Brazil)	Paulo Henrique Soares	0	0	0	0	0	0	0	0
FW	(Brazil)	João Pedro	0	0	0	0	0	0	0	0
GK	(Brazil)	Rafael	5	0	23	0	4	0	32	0
FW	(Argentina)	Miralles	0	0	7(6)	5	1(1)	0	15	5
MF	(Argentina)	Patricio Rodriguez	1(1)	0	3(8)	0	1(2)	0	16	0
DF	(Brazil)	Guilherme Santos	0	0	9(1)	0	0	0	10	0
FW	(Brazil)	Henrique	2(1)	0	0	0	1	0	4	0

Last updated: 8 December 2013
Source: Match reports in Competitive matches, Soccerway

=== Goalscorers ===
Ran	Pos	Nat	Name	Brasileirão	Paulistão	Copa do Brasil	Total
1	MF	(Brazil)	Cícero	15	9	0	24
2	FW	(Brazil)	Neymar	0	12	1	13
3	MF	(Argentina)	Montillo	5	2	1	8
4	FW	(Brazil)	Thiago Ribeiro	7	0	0	7
5	FW	(Brazil)	André	0	6	0	6
5	FW	(Brazil)	Giva	2	3	1	6
6	FW	(Argentina)	Miralles	0	5	0	5
6	FW	(Brazil)	Willian José	5	0	0	5
7	FW	(Brazil)	Neílton	4	0	0	4
8	DF	(Brazil)	Edu Dracena	2	1	0	3
8	DF	(Brazil)	Gustavo Henrique	2	0	1	3
9	DF	(Brazil)	Durval	0	1	1	2
9	FW	(Brazil)	Gabriel	1	0	1	2
9	FW	(Brazil)	Everton Costa	2	0	0	2
9	DF	(Brazil)	Cicinho	2	0	0	2
10	DF	(Brazil)	Rafael Galhardo	0	0	1	1
10	MF	(Brazil)	Leandrinho	0	0	1	1
10	MF	(Brazil)	Léo Cittadini	0	0	1	1
10	DF	(Brazil)	Emerson Palmieri	1	0	0	1
10	MF	(Brazil)	Renato Abreu	1	0	0	1
10	MF	(Brazil)	Léo	1	0	0	1
10	DF	(Brazil)	Bruno Peres	1	0	0	1
Total				51	39	9	99

Last updated: 8 December 2013
Source: Match reports in Competitive matches

=== Disciplinary record ===
N	Pos.	Nat.	Name	Yellow card	Second yellow card	Red card	Notes
	GK	(Brazil)	Rafael	2			
	FW	(Brazil)	Neymar	4		1	
	DF	(Brazil)	Durval	8			
	DF	(Brazil)	Bruno Peres	4			
	MF	(Brazil)	Renê Júnior	13			
	MF	(Argentina)	Montillo	5			
	MF	(Brazil)	Felipe Anderson	1	1		
	MF	(Brazil)	Marcos Assunção	3			
	DF	(Brazil)	Edu Dracena	13			
	MF	(Brazil)	Arouca	8			
	MF	(Brazil)	Cícero	10			
	MF	(Argentina)	Pato Rodríguez			1	
	DF	(Brazil)	Rafael Galhardo	4			
	MF	(Brazil)	Alan Santos	3			
	FW	(Brazil)	André	1			
	DF	(Brazil)	Neto	1			
	MF	(Brazil)	Léo	2			
	FW	(Brazil)	Henrique	1			
	FW	(Brazil)	Neílton	4			
	DF	(Brazil)	Gustavo Henrique	5			
	MF	(Brazil)	Léo Cittadini	1			
	DF	(Brazil)	Cicinho	7	1		
	MF	(Brazil)	Alison	8		1	
	FW	(Brazil)	Willian José	2		1	
	MF	(Brazil)	Leandrinho	3			
	DF	(Chile)	Eugenio Mena	7			
	FW	(Brazil)	Thiago Ribeiro	4			
	GK	(Brazil)	Aranha	3			
	FW	(Brazil)	Gabriel	2			
	FW	(Brazil)	Giva	1			
	GK	(Brazil)	Vladimir	1			
	FW	(Brazil)	Everton Costa	3			
	DF	(Brazil)	Emerson Palmieri	2			
	FW	(Brazil)	Geuvânio	1			

Last updated: 8 December 2013
Source: Match reports in Competitive matches
Only competitive matches
(yellow card) = Number of bookings; (second yellow card) = Number of sending offs after a second yellow card; (red card) = Number of sending offs by a direct red card.

== Club ==
=== Coaching staff ===
Position	Staff
Coach	Claudinei Oliveira
Assistant coach	Edinho; Marcelo Fernandes
Fitness trainer	Ricardo Rosa; Fernando Fernandez; Marco Alejandro
Goalkeeping coach	Arzul

Source: Santos FC

=== Other staff ===
Position	Staff
Coordinator	Carlos Eiki Baptista
Press Officer	Fábio Maradei
Doctors	Dr. Maurício Zenaide; Dr. Ricardo Nobre; Dr. Rodrigo Zogaib
Physiotherapists	Avelino Buongermino; Rafael Martini; Thiago Lobo
Physiologist	Dr. Luís Fernando de Barros
Massagist	Clóvis Vesco; Jorginho; Valder Bernardo
Nurse	Sylvio Cruz
Nutritionist	Sandra Merouço
Psychologist	Juliane Fechio
Equipment managers	França; Vagner Santos; Zuca
Driver	Arnaldo
Scout	Sandro Orlandelli

Source: Santos FC

=== Club officials ===
Position	Staff
President	Luis Álvaro de Oliveira Ribeiro
Vice-President	Odílio Rodrigues
Management Committee	José Paulo Fernandes; Thiers Fleming; Francisco Cembranelli; Luís Cláudio de Aquino Barroso; Ronald Monteiro
Football manager	Zinho

Last updated: 26 August 2013

=== Kit ===
Home	Away	Third

Source: Home Ayaw Third

==== Official sponsorship ====
- CSU CardSystem
- Seara
- Corr Plastik
- Minds Idiomas
- Zurich Seguros

== Transfers ==
=== Transfers in ===
P	Name	Age	Moving from	Ends	Source	Notes
DF	(Brazil) Neto	27	Guarani	2014		
DF	(Brazil) Maranhão	27	Atlético–PR	2013		Loan return
MF	(Venezuela) Breitner	23	Naútico	2014		Loan return
FW	(Brazil) Tiago Luís	23	Bragantino	2013		Loan return
MF	(Brazil) Pinga	31	Al Dhafra (United Arab Emirates)	2013		
MF	(Argentina) Montillo	28	Cruzeiro	2015		
MF	(Brazil) Marcos Assunção	36	Free Agent	2013		
DF	(Brazil) Rafael Caldeira	22	Botafogo–SP	2014		Loan return
FW	(Brazil) Geuvânio	21	Penapolense	2014		Loan return
DF	(Brazil) Crystian	20	Botafogo–SP	2015		Loan return
FW	(Brazil) Dimba	21	Botafogo–SP	2014		Loan return
MF	(Brazil) Anderson Carvalho	23	Penapolense	2014		Loan return
MF	(Venezuela) Breitner	23	Araxá	2014		Loan return
DF	(Brazil) Vinicius Simon	26	América Mineiro	2014		Loan return
DF	(Brazil) Cicinho	24	Ponte Preta	2018		
FW	(Brazil) Thiago Ribeiro	27	Cagliari (Italy)	2017		
MF	(Brazil) Renato Abreu	35	Free Agent	2013		

=== Loans in ===
P	Name	Age	Loaned from	Loan expires	Source
MF	(Brazil) Renê Júnior	23	Tombense	2013	
DF	(Brazil) Guilherme Santos	24	Atlético Mineiro	2013	
MF	(Brazil) Cícero	28	Tombense	2014	
FW	(Brazil) Henrique	23	Mirassol	2013	
FW	(Brazil) Willian José	21	Deportivo Maldonado (Uruguay)	2014	
DF	(Chile) Mena	24	Universidad de Chile	2014	
MF	(Brazil) Misael	19	Grêmio	2015	
FW	(Brazil) Everton Costa	27	Coritiba	2013	

=== Transfers out ===
P	Name	Age	Moving to	Type	Source
MF	(Brazil) Bernardo	22	Vasco	Loan expiration	
DF	(Brazil) Juan	30	São Paulo	Loan expiration	
DF	(Uruguay) Fucile	28	Porto (Portugal)	Loan expiration	
MF	(Brazil) Ewerton Páscoa	23	Criciúma	Loan expiration	
DF	(Brazil) Bruno Rodrigo	27	Free Agent	End of contract	
DF	(Brazil) Gérson Magrão	27	Free Agent	Contract terminated	
DF	(Brazil) Pará	26	Grêmio	Transferred	
MF	(Brazil) Henrique	27	Cruzeiro	Swapped^{1}	
GK	(Brazil) Felipe	24	Naútico	Transferred	
FW	(Brazil) Tiago Luís	23	Free Agent	End of contract	
FW	(Brazil) Bill	28	Al-Ittihad (Saudi Arabia)	Contract terminated	
MF	(Brazil) Adriano	25	Grêmio	Transferred	
DF	(Brazil) Maranhão	27	Naútico	Transferred	
MF	(Brazil) Pinga	32	Free Agent	End of contract	
FW	(Brazil) André	23	Vasco	Contract terminated	
FW	(Brazil) Neymar	21	Barcelona (Spain)	Transferred	
MF	(Brazil) Felipe Anderson	20	Lazio (Italy)	Transferred	
DF	(Brazil) Paulo Henrique Soares	20	Rio Ave (Portugal)	Contract terminated	
MF	(Brazil) João Pedro	21	Estoril (Portugal)	Contract terminated	
GK	(Brazil) Rafael	23	Napoli (Italy)	Transferred	
FW	(Argentina) Miralles	30	Atlante (Mexico)	Transferred	
DF	(Brazil) Guilherme Santos	25	Atlético–GO	Contract terminated	
FW	(Brazil) Henrique	23	Portuguesa	Contract terminated	

- 1: Included in Montillo transfer

=== Loans out ===
P	Name	Age	Loaned to	Loan expires	Source
FW	(Brazil) Tiago Alves	19	América Mineiro	End of the season	
DF	(Brazil) Crystian	20	Botafogo–SP	19 May 2013	
DF	(Brazil) Rafael Caldeira	21	Botafogo–SP	19 May 2013	
FW	(Brazil) Dimba	20	Botafogo–SP	19 May 2013	
MF	(Brazil) Anderson Carvalho	22	Penapolense	19 May 2013	
DF	(Brazil) David Braz	25	Vitória	End of the season	
MF	(Venezuela) Breitner	23	Araxá	30 May 2013	
FW	(Brazil) Geuvânio	20	Penapolense	19 May 2013	
GK	(Brazil) Fábio Costa	35	São Caetano	End of the season	
DF	(Brazil) Vinicius Simon	26	Sport	End of the season	
MF	(Argentina) Patricio Rodriguez	23	Estudiantes (Argentina)	31 July 2014	
DF	(Brazil) Crystian	20	Boa Esporte	End of the season	
FW	(Brazil) Dimba	20	Boa Esporte	End of the season	

=== Contracts ===
No.	Pos.	Nat.	Name	Age	Status	Contract length	Expiry date	Source
	DF	(Brazil)	Jubal	19	Signed	4 years	December 2017	Estadão
	MF	(Brazil)	Alison	20	Signed	4 years	December 2017	Globo Esporte
	MF	(Brazil)	Leandrinho	19	Signed	4 years	December 2017	Globo Esporte
	MF	(Brazil)	Arouca	27	Signed	3 years	December 2016	Estadão
	MF	(Brazil)	Léo Cittadini	19	Signed	5 years	December 2018	Terra
	GK	(Brazil)	Aranha	32	Signed	2 years	December 2015	UOL Esporte
	GK	(Brazil)	Gabriel Gasparotto	19	Signed	3 years	December 2016	Globo Esporte
	MF	(Brazil)	Pedro Castro	20	Signed	3 years	December 2016	Globo Esporte

== Friendlies ==
16 January Friendly	Santos	4–0	Grêmio Barueri	São Paulo
21:00 UTC-02:00	Neymar 25' (pen.); Rafael Galhardo 45'; Miralles 51'; Bill 55'	Report		Stadium: Pacaembu; Attendance: 14,589; Referee: Renato Canadinho

2 August Joan Gamper Trophy	Barcelona (Spain)	8–0	Santos	Barcelona, Spain
21:30 UTC+02:00	Messi 7'; Léo 11' (o.g.); Alexis Sánchez 21'; Pedro 28'; Fàbregas 52', 67'; Adriano 74'; Dongou 82'	Report		Stadium: Camp Nou; Attendance: 81,251; Referee: Javier Estrada Fernández

29 September Asian tour	Vietnam U–23	3–1	Santos	Ho Chi Minh City, Vietnam
18:00 UTC+07:00	Văn Thắng 43', 87'; Hồng Quân 90+4'	Report	90' Pedro Castro	Stadium: Thống Nhất Stadium

3 October Indonesian Cup	Persipura (Indonesia)	2–1	Santos	Jakarta, Indonesia
	Boaz Solossa 17'; Ian Kabes 48'		2' Geovane

== Competitions ==
=== Overall summary ===
Competition	Started round	Final position / round	First match	Last match
Campeonato Brasileiro	—	7th	26 May 2013	8 December 2013
Campeonato Paulista	First stage	Runners-up	19 January 2013	19 May 2013
Copa do Brasil	First round	Round of 16	10 April 2013	28 August 2013

Updated to match played 8 December 2013
Source: Competitions

=== Detailed overall summary ===
	Total	Home	Away
Games played	69	35	34
Games won	30	18	12
Games drawn	24	14	10
Games lost	15	3	12
Biggest win	5–1 v Náutico	4–1 v Portuguesa	5–1 v Náutico
Biggest loss	0–3 v Portuguesa	1–3 v Paulista	0–3 v Portuguesa
Clean sheets	23	13	10
Goals scored	99	52	47
Goals conceded	69	27	42
Goal difference	+30	+25	+5
Average GF per game	1.43	1.44	1.38
Average GA per game	1.03	0.77	1.24
Yellow cards (yellow card)	138	68	70
Red cards (red card)	6	5	1
Most appearances	Cícero (66)	Cícero (33)	Cícero (33)
Top scorer	Cícero (24)	Cícero (15)	Neymar (9); Cícero (9)
Worst discipline	Renê Júnior (yellow card) (13)	Cícero (yellow card) (6)	Renê Júnior (yellow card) (8)
Points	114/207 (55.07%)	68/105 (64.76%)	46/102 (45.1%)
Winning rate	(44.12%)	(51.43%)	(35.29%)

Last updated: 8 December 2013
Source: Competitive matches

=== Campeonato Brasileiro ===
==== Results summary ====
Overall								Home						Away					
Pld	W	D	L	GF	GA	GD	Pts	W	D	L	GF	GA	GD	W	D	L	GF	GA	GD
38	15	12	11	51	38	+13	57	10	7	2	28	13	+15	5	5	9	23	25	−2

Last updated: 8 December 2013.
Source: Soccerway

==== Results by round ====
Round	1	2	3	4	5	6	7	8	9	10	11	12	13	14	15	16	17	18	19	20	21	22	23	24	25	26	27	28	29	30	31	32	33	34	35	36	37	38
Ground	H	A	H	A	H	A	H	H	A	H	A	H	A	H	A	A	H	A	A	H	A	H	H	A	H	A	A	H	H	A	A	H	A	H	A	H	H	A
Result	D	L	D	L	W	W	W	D	L	D	D	D	D	W	W	L	W	W	L	L	D	W	D	L	W	L	L	W	D	W	D	L	D	W	L	W	W	W
Position	12	14	15	18	16	10	8	7	9	14	15	16	15	13	11	13	9	7	7	9	11	7	6	9	7	8	10	9	9	8	8	9	9	9	10	8	8	7

Updated to match(es) played on 8 December 2013. Source: Globo Esporte
W = Win; D = Draw; L = Loss

==== League table ====
Pos	Team	Pld	W	D	L	GF	GA	GD	Pts	Qualification or relegation
5	Vitória	38	16	11	11	59	53	+6	59	
6	Goiás	38	16	11	11	48	44	+4	59	
7	Santos	38	15	12	11	51	38	+13	57	
8	Atlético Mineiro	38	15	12	11	49	38	+11	57	2014 Copa Libertadores Second Stage (Note: Atlético Mineiro is qualified for the second stage of the 2014 Copa Libertadores as the 2013 Copa Libertadores champion. Flamengo is qualified for the second stage of the 2014 Copa Libertadores as the 2013 Copa do Brasil champion.)
9	São Paulo	38	14	8	16	39	40	−1	50	

Updated to match(es) played on unknown. Source: Soccerway.com
Rules for classification: 1st points; 2nd wins; 3rd goal difference; 4th goals scored; 5th head-to-head results; 6th least red cards received; 7th least yellow cards received; 8th draw.

==== Matches ====
26 May 1	Santos	0–0	Flamengo	Brasília
16:00 UTC-03:00	Henrique (yellow card) 36'	Report	(yellow card) 61' Luiz Antônio	Stadium: Mané Garrincha; Attendance: 63,501; Referee: Wilton Pereira Sampaio (GO)

29 May 2	Botafogo	2–1	Santos	Volta Redonda
19:30 UTC-03:00	Fellype Gabriel 14'; Rafael Marques 21'	Report	(yellow card) 62' Durval; 71' Montillo	Stadium: Raulino de Oliveira; Attendance: 1,186; Referee: Jailson Macedo Freitas (BA)

1 June 3	Santos	1–1	Grêmio	Santos
16:20 UTC-03:00	Léo (yellow card) 22'; Arouca (yellow card) 71'; Willian José 78' (pen.)	Report	11' (yellow card) 90' Vargas; (yellow card) 37' Pará; (yellow card) 47' Werley; (yellow card) 74' Zé Roberto; (yellow card) 76' Souza	Stadium: Vila Belmiro; Attendance: 6,329; Referee: Marcelo de Lima Henrique (RJ)

5 June 4	Criciúma	3–1	Santos	Criciúma
19:30 UTC-03:00	João Vitor 15'; Giancarlo 57' (pen.) (yellow card) 89'; Matheus Ferraz 66'	Report	(yellow card) 29' Renê Júnior; (yellow card) 56' Rafael Galhardo; 90+2' (yellow card) 63' Neílton; (yellow card) 64' Durval	Stadium: Heriberto Hülse; Attendance: 11,392; Referee: Pablo dos Santos Alves (ES)

12 June 5	Santos	1–0	Atlético Mineiro	Santos
19:30 UTC-03:00	Cícero 3' (yellow card) 62'; Gustavo Henrique (yellow card) 30'; Léo Cittadini (yellow card) 85'	Report	(yellow card) 60' Rafael Marques; (red card) 79' Marcos Rocha; (yellow card) 84' Guilherme	Stadium: Vila Belmiro; Attendance: 4,178; Referee: Márcio Chagas da Silva (RS)

7 July 6	São Paulo	0–2	Santos	São Paulo
16:00 UTC-03:00	Denílson (yellow card) 10'; Wellington (yellow card) 86'	Report	(yellow card) 24' Arouca; 57' Giva; 72' Cícero	Stadium: Morumbi; Attendance: 11,819; Referee: Raphael Claus (SP)

13 July 7	Santos	4–1	Portuguesa	Santos
18:30 UTC-03:00	Neílton 1', 75'; Willian José 10'; Rafael Galhardo (yellow card) 68'; Giva 90+2'	Report	(yellow card) 61' Ferdinando; 87' Bruno Moraes	Stadium: Vila Belmiro; Attendance: 5,860; Referee: Rodrigo Guarizo Ferreira do Amaral (SP)

21 July 8	Santos	2–2	Coritiba	Santos
16:00 UTC-03:00	Neílton 20'; Cícero 64'	Report	41', 87' Alex; (yellow card) 46' Leandro Almeida	Stadium: Vila Belmiro; Attendance: 9,577; Referee: Leandro Vuaden (RS)

27 July 9	Ponte Preta	1–0	Santos	Campinas
21:00 UTC-03:00	Rildo 49'; Diego Sacoman (yellow card) 79'	Report	(yellow card) 78' Cicinho	Stadium: Moisés Lucarelli; Attendance: 4,407; Referee: Leandro Bizzio Marinho (SP)

7 August 12	Santos	1–1	Corinthians	Santos
21:50 UTC-03:00	Alison (yellow card) 15'; Willian José 55' (red card) 69'; Edu Dracena (yellow card) 89'; Neílton (yellow card) 90+1'	Report	3' (red card) 70' Paulo André; (yellow card) 65' Edenilson; (yellow card) 80' Douglas	Stadium: Vila Belmiro; Attendance: 8,120; Referee: Marcelo Aparecido de Souza (SP)

11 August 13	Cruzeiro	0–0	Santos	Belo Horizonte
16:00 UTC-03:00	Martinuccio (yellow card) 49'; Vinícius Araújo (yellow card) 59'	Report	(yellow card) 40' Alison; (yellow card) 66' Edu Dracena; (yellow card) 71' Mena; (yellow card) 82' Thiago Ribeiro; (yellow card) 90' Leandrinho	Stadium: Mineirão; Attendance: 27,444; Referee: Paulo Henrique Godoy Bezerra

14 August 14	Santos	1–1	Vasco	Santos
19:30 UTC-03:00	Edu Dracena 76'	Report	90+1' Rafael Vaz	Stadium: Vila Belmiro; Attendance: 3,898; Referee: Edivaldo Elias da Silva

18 August 15	Bahia	0–0	Santos	Salvador
18:30 UTC-03:00	Raul (yellow card) 48'; Titi (yellow card) 61' (yellow-red card) 88'	Report	(yellow card) 21' Cicinho; (yellow card) 35' Mena; (yellow card) 87' Aranha	Stadium: Fonte Nova; Attendance: 12,909; Referee: Dewson Fernando Freitas da Silva

24 August 16	Santos	2–0	Vitória	Santos
18:30 UTC-03:00	Gabriel 8'; Alison (yellow card) 49'; Cícero (yellow card) 50' (goal) 55'; Aranha (yellow card) 76'; Montillo (yellow card) 90'	Report	(yellow card) 41' Renato Cajá	Stadium: Vila Belmiro; Attendance: 8,350; Referee: Pablo dos Santos Alves

31 August 17	Fluminense	0–2	Santos	Rio de Janeiro
21:00 UTC-03:00	Gum (yellow card) 32'	Report	12' Thiago Ribeiro; 28' Cícero; (yellow card) 37' Mena	Stadium: Maracanã; Attendance: 8,136; Referee: Leandro Pedro Vuaden (RS)

4 September 18	Atlético Paranaense	2–1	Santos	Curitiba
19:30 UTC-03:00	Marcelo 6' (yellow card) 74'; Marco Antônio 37'; Felipe (yellow card) 90+1'	Report	(yellow card) 41' Thiago Ribeiro; 86' Emerson Palmieri	Stadium: Vila Capanema; Attendance: 12,595; Referee: Marcelo de Lima Henrique (RJ)

7 September 19	Santos	1–0	Goiás	Santos
18:30 UTC-03:00	Thiago Ribeiro 49'	Report	(yellow card) 12' Dudu Cearense; (yellow card) 72' Neto Baiano; (yellow card) 77' Hugo	Stadium: Vila Belmiro; Attendance: 8,868; Referee: Wagner Reway (MT)

10 September 10	Internacional	1–2	Santos	Novo Hamburgo
19:30 UTC-03:00	D'Alessandro 75' (pen.); Willians (yellow card) 86'; Fabrício (yellow card) 87' (yellow-red card) 87'	Report	(yellow card) 17' Cicinho; 27' Thiago Ribeiro; 66' Renato Abreu; (yellow card) 74' Alison; (yellow card) 84' Edu Dracena	Stadium: Estádio do Vale; Attendance: 7,793; Referee: Marcelo de Lima Henrique (RJ)

12 September 20	Flamengo	2–1	Santos	Rio de Janeiro
21:00 UTC-03:00	Léo Moura 19'; Carlos Eduardo (yellow card) 36'; Hernane 54'; Samir (yellow card) 55'; Víctor Cáceres (yellow card) 86'; Elias (yellow card) 89'	Report	57' (pen.) Cícero; (yellow card) 69' Gabriel; (yellow card) 90+1' Willian José; (yellow card) 90+2' Cicinho	Stadium: Maracanã; Attendance: 16,203; Referee: Sandro Meira Ricci (FPF)

15 September 21	Santos	1–2	Botafogo	Santos
18:30 UTC-03:00	Mena (yellow card) 23'; Alison (yellow card) 62'; Cícero 66'; Cicinho (yellow card) 88'	Report	(yellow card) 3' Seedorf; (yellow card) 24' Dória; 38', 56' Elias; (yellow card) 44' Hyuri; (yellow card) 90+3' Gegê	Stadium: Vila Belmiro; Attendance: 11,301; Referee: André Luiz de Freitas (GO)

18 September 22	Grêmio	1–1	Santos	Porto Alegre
19:30 UTC-03:00	Elano 72'	Report	(yellow card) 24' Cícero; (yellow card) 56' Alison; 84' Willian José	Stadium: Arena do Grêmio; Attendance: 13,641; Referee: Péricles Bassols Cortez (RJ)

22 September 23	Santos	2–1	Criciúma	Santos
19:30 UTC-03:00	Thiago Ribeiro 19' (yellow card) 88'; Willian José 41'; Montillo (yellow card) 44'; Arouca (yellow card) 49'	Report	(yellow card) 7' João Vitor; (yellow card) 36' Elton; (yellow card) 55' Henik; 78' Tony	Stadium: Vila Belmiro; Attendance: 5,147; Referee: Arilson Bispo da Anunciação (BA)

25 September 11	Santos	1–1	Náutico	Santos
21:00 UTC-03:00	Giva (yellow card) 53'; Leandrinho (yellow card) 78'; Cícero 84'	Report	(yellow card) 26' (goal) 82' Maikon Leite; (yellow card) 30' Derley; (yellow card) 71' Rogério; (yellow card) 88' Leandro Amaro; (yellow card) 88' Martinez; (yellow card) 90+2' Maranhão	Stadium: Vila Belmiro; Attendance: 5,108; Referee: Francisco Carlos Nascimento (AL)

29 September 24	Atlético Mineiro	3–1	Santos	Belo Horizonte
18:30 UTC-03:00	Luan 17'; Marcos Rocha 36' (yellow card) 57'; Neto Berola (yellow card) 81'; Alecsandro 87'	Report	14' Cicinho; (yellow card) 70' Gustavo Henrique; (yellow card) 90+3' Mena	Stadium: Independência; Attendance: 8,465; Referee: Marcelo de Lima Henrique (RJ)

2 October 25	Santos	3–0	São Paulo	Santos
21:50 UTC-03:00	Edu Dracena 22'; Cícero (yellow card) 35'; Alison (red card) 42'; Thiago Ribeiro 59' (yellow card) 64'; Léo 89'; Aranha (yellow card) 90+2'	Report	(yellow card) 10' Luís Fabiano	Stadium: Vila Belmiro; Attendance: 7,788; Referee: Ricardo Marques Ribeiro (MG)

6 October 26	Portuguesa	3–0	Santos	São Paulo
18:30 UTC-03:00	Luis Ricardo 15'; Rogério (yellow card) 26'; Bergson (yellow card) 44'; Gilberto 59', 66'	Report	(yellow card) 65' Vladimir; (yellow card) 88' Mena	Stadium: Canindé; Attendance: 7,979; Referee: Péricles Bassols Cortez (RJ)

9 October 27	Coritiba	1–0	Santos	Curitiba
19:30 UTC-03:00	Júlio César 62'; Diogo Goiano (yellow card) 88'; Junior Urso (yellow card) 90+2'	Report	(yellow card) 14' Arouca; (yellow card) 39' Everton Costa; (yellow card) 90+1' Neílton	Stadium: Couto Pereira; Attendance: 14,406; Referee: Alício Pena Júnior (MG)

12 October 28	Santos	2–1	Ponte Preta	São Paulo
21:00 UTC-03:00	Edu Dracena (yellow card) 25'; Alison (yellow card) 33'; Everton Costa 45'; Montillo 69'; Cicinho (yellow card) 80' (yellow-red card) 86'; Leandrinho (yellow card) 90+2'	Report	(yellow card) 39' Elias; (yellow card) 56' Ferron; (yellow card) 78' Édson Bastos; 89' Rafael Ratão	Stadium: Pacaembu; Attendance: 7,230; Referee: Marcelo Aparecido de Souza (SP)

16 October 29	Santos	0–0	Internacional	Santos
19:30 UTC-03:00	Bruno Peres (yellow card) 32'; Emerson Palmieri (yellow card) 68'	Report	(yellow card) 38' Juan; (yellow card) 66' João Afonso	Stadium: Vila Belmiro; Attendance: 3,486; Referee: André Luiz de Freitas (GO)

19 October 30	Náutico	1–5	Santos	São Lourenço da Mata
18:30 UTC-03:00	Martinez (yellow card) 41'; Maikon Leite 50'; Elicarlos (yellow card) 76'; Tiago Real (yellow card) 76'	Report	1' Thiago Ribeiro; 21', 88' Cícero; 24' (yellow card) 88' Everton Costa; 26' (yellow card) 27' Cicinho; (yellow card) 46' Arouca; (yellow card) 63' Edu Dracena	Stadium: Arena Pernambuco; Attendance: 5,452; Referee: Rodrigo Nunes de Sá (RJ)

27 October 31	Corinthians	1–1	Santos	Araraquara
16:00 UTC-02:00	Douglas 26'	Report	61' Gustavo Henrique	Stadium: Fonte Luminosa; Attendance: 17,949; Referee: Leandro Vuaden (RS)

3 November 32	Santos	0–1	Cruzeiro	Santos
17:00 UTC-02:00	Everton Costa (yellow card) 43'; Cicinho (yellow card) 85'	Report	54' Éverton Ribeiro; (yellow card) 84' Tinga	Stadium: Vila Belmiro; Attendance: 9,460; Referee: Marcelo de Lima Henrique (RJ)

10 November 33	Vasco	2–2	Santos	Rio de Janeiro
19:30 UTC-02:00	Edmilson 28'; André 77' (yellow card) 78'; Yotún (yellow card) 85'	Report	22' Bruno Peres; 26' Gustavo Henrique; (yellow card) 72' Willian José; (yellow card) 87' Geuvânio	Stadium: Maracanã; Attendance: 56,756; Referee: Wilton Pereira Sampaio (GO)

14 November 34	Santos	3–0	Bahia	São Paulo
19:30 UTC-02:00	Montillo 36'; Cícero 65', 71'	Report	(yellow card) 75' Hélder	Stadium: Pacaembu; Attendance: 15,273; Referee: Felipe Gomes da Silva (RJ)

17 November 35	Vitória	2–0	Santos	Salvador
17:00 UTC-02:00	Dinei 20'; Kadu (yellow card) 33'; Maxi Biancucchi 83'	Report	(yellow card) 15' Bruno Peres; (yellow card) 66' Alison; (yellow card) 88' Emerson Palmieri	Stadium: Barradão; Attendance: 13,738; Referee: Sandro Meira Ricci (FPF)

24 November 36	Santos	1–0	Fluminense	Presidente Prudente
17:00 UTC-02:00	Mena (yellow card) 56'; Thiago Ribeiro 64'; Arouca (yellow card) 85'	Report	(yellow card) 30' Rhayner; (yellow card) 90+2' Digão	Stadium: Prudentão; Attendance: 4,369; Referee: Francisco Carlos Nascimento (AL)

1 December 37	Santos	2–1	Atlético Paranaense	São José do Rio Preto
19:30 UTC-02:00	Edu Dracena (yellow card) 30'; Cícero 33', 76'; Alan Santos (yellow card) 79'	Report	27' (yellow card) 28' Marcelo; (yellow card) 61' Bruno Silva	Stadium: Teixeirão; Attendance: 11,431; Referee: Wagner Reway (MT)

8 December 38	Goiás	0–3	Santos	Goiânia
17:00 UTC-02:00	Hugo (red card) 89'	Report	5' Cícero; 44', 76' Montillo; (yellow card) 49' Gustavo Henrique; (yellow card) 62' Durval	Stadium: Serra Dourada; Attendance: 25,238; Referee: Jean Pierre Gonçalves Lima (RS)

=== Copa do Brasil ===
==== First round ====
10 April 1st leg	Flamengo–PI	2–2	Santos	Teresina
22:00 UTC-03:00	Niel (yellow card) 16'; Édson Di 33', 54'; Laércio (yellow card) 37' (yellow-red card) 82'; Rafinha (yellow card) 41'	Report	26' Giva; 30' Montillo; (yellow card) 32' Rafael; (yellow card) 71' Edu Dracena; (yellow card) 73' Rafael Galhardo	Stadium: Albertão; Attendance: 25,400; Referee: Pablo Ramon Gonçalves Pinheiro (RN)

17 April Replay	Santos	2–0 (4–2 agg.)	Flamengo–PI	Santos
22:00 UTC-03:00	Edu Dracena (yellow card) 43'; Rafael Galhardo 70'; Neymar 85'	Report	(yellow card) 33' Léo Maceió; (yellow card) 60' Rafael; (yellow card) 62' Niel; (yellow card) 71' Duda; (yellow card) 78' Adairlan	Stadium: Vila Belmiro; Attendance: 8,732; Referee: Paulo Henrique Schleich Vollkopf (MS)

==== Second round ====
8 May 1st leg	Joinville	0–1	Santos	Joinville
22:00 UTC-03:00	Matheus Carvalho (yellow card) 9'; Marcelo Costa (yellow card) 31'; Rafael (yellow card) 34'; Carlos Alberto (yellow card) 82'	Report	(yellow card) 30' Renê Júnior; (yellow card) 77' Marcos Assunção; 82' Durval	Stadium: Arena Joinville; Attendance: 15,991; Referee: Márcio Chagas da Silva (RS)

22 May Replay	Santos	0–0 (1–0 agg.)	Joinville	Santos
22:00 UTC-03:00	Renê Júnior (yellow card) 33'; Durval (yellow card) 83'	Report	(yellow card) 23' Ligüera; (yellow card) 52' Rafael	Stadium: Vila Belmiro; Attendance: 4,758; Referee: Dewson Fernando Freitas da Silva (PA)

==== Third round ====
10 July 1st leg	Santos	1–1	CRAC	Santos
21:50 UTC-03:00	Leandrinho 38'; Alan Santos (yellow card) 74'; Cícero (yellow card) 90+3'	Report	(yellow card) 21' Pantico; (yellow card) 41' Washington; 66' Ben-Hur	Stadium: Vila Belmiro; Attendance: 3,800; Referee: Leandro Júnior Hermes (PR)

24 July 2nd leg	CRAC	0–2 (1–3 agg.)	Santos	Catalão
21:50 UTC-03:00	Diogo Medeiros (yellow card) 33'	Report	8' (yellow card) 62' Gustavo Henrique; 74' Léo Cittadini	Stadium: Genervino da Fonseca; Attendance: 1,568; Referee: Wagner Reway (MT)

==== Round of 16 ====
21 August 1st leg	Santos	1–0	Grêmio	Santos
19:30 UTC-03:00	Montillo (yellow card) 9'; Edu Dracena (yellow card) 31'; Neílton (yellow card) 68'; Durval (yellow card) 69'; Gabriel 76' (yellow card) 77'	Report	(yellow card) 53' Barcos; (yellow card) 72' Bressan; (yellow card) 74' Kléber	Stadium: Vila Belmiro; Attendance: 6,195; Referee: Jailson Macedo Freitas (BA)

28 August 2nd leg	Grêmio	2–0 (2–1 agg.)	Santos	Porto Alegre
21:50 UTC-03:00	Souza 54' (yellow card) 26'; Kléber (yellow card) 60'; Maxi Rodríguez (yellow card) 63'; Werley 87'	Report	(yellow card) 12' Renê Júnior; (yellow card) 14' Gustavo Henrique; (yellow card) 89' Cícero; (red card) 90' Galhardo	Stadium: Arena do Grêmio; Attendance: 26,960; Referee: Felipe Gomes da Silva (RJ)

=== Campeonato Paulista ===
==== Results summary ====
Overall								Home						Away					
Pld	W	D	L	GF	GA	GD	Pts	W	D	L	GF	GA	GD	W	D	L	GF	GA	GD
23	11	9	3	39	26	+13	42	6	5	1	20	13	+7	5	4	2	19	13	+6

Last updated: 19 May 2013.
Source: Soccerway

==== First stage ====
===== League table =====
Pos	Team	Pld	W	D	L	GF	GA	GD	Pts	Qualification or relegation
1	São Paulo	19	13	2	4	34	18	+16	41	Advanced to the Quarter-finals
2	Mogi Mirim	19	12	3	4	36	19	+17	39	Advanced to the Quarter-finals
3	Santos	19	11	6	2	35	21	+14	39	Advanced to the Quarter-finals
4	Ponte Preta	19	10	8	1	27	13	+14	38	Advanced to the Quarter-finals
5	Corinthians	19	9	8	2	31	16	+15	35	Advanced to the Quarter-finals

Updated to match(es) played on unknown. Source:
Rules for classification: 1st points; 2nd games won; 3rd number of goals scored; 4th results between the teams; 5th less red cards; 6th less yellow cards; 7th raffle.

===== Results by round =====
Round	1	2	3	4	5	6	7	8	9	10	11	12	13	14	15	16	17	18	19
Ground	A	H	A	A	H	A	H	A	H	H	A	H	H	A	H	A	H	A	H
Result	W	W	D	W	W	D	L	L	W	D	W	W	W	D	D	W	D	W	W
Position	2	1	1	1	1	1	2	4	4	3	3	3	2	3	3	3	4	4	3

Updated to match(es) played on 21 April 2013. Source: Globo Esporte
W = Win; D = Draw; L = Loss

===== Matches =====
19 January 1	São Bernardo	1–3	Santos	São Bernardo do Campo
19:30 UTC-02:00	Naldinho 21'; Dudu (yellow card) 28' (yellow-red card) 34'; Daniel Marques (yellow card) 39'; Gleidson (yellow card) 59'; Samuel (yellow card) 65'	Report	19', 90+1' (yellow card) 59' Neymar; (yellow card) 44' Rafael; (yellow card) 63' Durval; 79' Miralles	Stadium: Primeiro de Maio; Attendance: 13,436; Referee: Thiago Duarte Peixoto

23 January 2	Santos	3–0	Botafogo–SP	Santos
19:30 UTC-02:00	Cícero 32'; Bruno Peres (yellow card) 34'; Neymar 40'; Miralles 90+1'	Report	(yellow card) 18' Franci; (yellow card) 44' Cris; (yellow card) 54' Francisco Alex; (yellow card) 74' Henrique Mattos; (yellow card) 78' Gilmak	Stadium: Vila Belmiro; Attendance: 12,173; Referee: Marcelo Pietro Alfieri

27 January 3	Bragantino	2–2	Santos	Bragança Paulista
19:30 UTC-02:00	Raphael Andrade 27'; Carlinhos (yellow card) 44'; Preto (yellow card) 54'; Diego Macedo 64' (yellow card) 65'; Serginho (yellow card) 78'; Geandro (yellow card) 80'	Report	50' Cícero; (yellow card) 73' Renê Júnior; (yellow card) 87' Montillo; 90' Neymar	Stadium: Abi Nabi Chedid; Attendance: 7,949; Referee: Raphael Claus

30 January 4	Ituano	0–1	Santos	Itu
22:00 UTC-02:00	Leandro Silva (yellow card) 39' (yellow-red card) 86'; Tiago Bezerra (yellow card) 67'	Report	(yellow card) 12' Durval; 48' Cícero	Stadium: Novelli Júnior; Attendance: 8,910; Referee: Leonardo Ferreira Lima

3 February 5	Santos	3–1	São Paulo	Santos
17:00 UTC-02:00	Miralles 39', 70'; Renê Júnior (yellow card) 41'; Neymar 48'	Report	(yellow card) 29' Denílson; 65' Jádson; (yellow card) 90' Cañete	Stadium: Vila Belmiro; Attendance: 14,283; Referee: Flávio Rodrigues Guerra

6 February 6	Linense	2–2	Santos	Lins
19:30 UTC-02:00	Elias 38'; Leandro Brasília 45+2' (yellow card) 56'; Gilsinho (yellow card) 54'	Report	19' Cícero; 54' Miralles; (yellow card) 66' Felipe Anderson	Stadium: Gilbertão; Attendance: 5,092; Referee: Adriano de Assis Miranda

10 February 7	Santos	1–3	Paulista	São Paulo
17:00 UTC-02:00	Marcos Assunção (yellow card) 60'; Neymar 90+1' (yellow card) 90+2'	Report	(yellow card) 21' Dráusio; (yellow card) 44' (yellow-red card) 83' Matheus Galdezani; 51' Marcelo Macedo; (yellow card) 64' Chiquinho; 84' Rodolfo Testoni; 86' Cassiano Bodini	Stadium: Pacaembu; Attendance: 18,381; Referee: Leandro Bizzio Marinho

17 February 8	Ponte Preta	3–1	Santos	Campinas
18:30 UTC-03:00	Bruno Silva 11' (yellow card) 48'; Édson Bastos (yellow card) 36'; Artur (red card) 45+1'; Alemão 41', 90+2'	Report	(yellow card) 33' Edu Dracena; (yellow card) 39' Bruno Peres; (red card) 45+1' Neymar; 41' André	Stadium: Moisés Lucarelli; Attendance: 11,747; Referee: Luiz Flávio de Oliveira

24 February 9	Santos	2–1	XV de Piracicaba	Santos
18:30 UTC-03:00	André 70' (pen.), 73'; Renê Júnior (yellow card) 71'; Arouca (yellow card) 72'	Report	51' Cesinha; (yellow card) 53' Vinicius Bovi; (yellow card) 69' Luiz Eduardo	Stadium: Vila Belmiro; Attendance: 5,103; Referee: Aurélio Santana Martins

3 March 10	Santos	0–0	Corinthians	São Paulo
16:00 UTC-03:00	Neymar (yellow card) 53'; Marcos Assunção (yellow card) 76'; Cícero (yellow card) 84'	Report	(yellow card) 51' Edenílson	Stadium: Morumbi; Attendance: 17,155; Referee: Guilherme Ceretta de Lima

10 March 11	Atlético Sorocaba	1–2	Santos	Sorocaba
18:30 UTC-03:00	Da Silva (yellow card) 42'; Tiago Marques 48'; Wellington (yellow card) 84'	Report	15' Montillo; (yellow card) 35' Cícero; 45' André	Stadium: Walter Ribeiro; Attendance: 8,472; Referee: Flávio Rodrigues de Souza

16 March 12	Santos	2–1	Guarani	Santos
16:00 UTC-03:00	Cícero (yellow card) 28'; Montillo 34'; André 48'	Report	(yellow card) 40' (goal) 58' Tiago Pagnussat; (yellow card) 90+2' Boiadeiro	Stadium: Vila Belmiro; Attendance: 10,865; Referee: Rodrigo Guarizo Ferreira do Amaral

21 March 13	Santos	2–1	Mirassol	Santos
UTC-03:00	Felipe Anderson (yellow card) 27' (yellow-red card) 86'; Giva 40', 73'; Pato Rodríguez (red card) 87'	Report	20' André Luís; (yellow card) 75' Emerson; (yellow card) 90+1' Diogo	Stadium: Vila Belmiro; Attendance: 3,436; Referee: Rodrigo Braghetto

24 March 14	Palmeiras	0–0	Santos	São Paulo
16:00 UTC-03:00	André Luiz (yellow card) 53'	Report	(yellow card) 4' Renê Júnior	Stadium: Pacaembu; Attendance: 11,912; Referee: Marcelo Aparecido Ribeiro de Souza

28 March 15	Santos	2–2	Mogi Mirim	Santos
19:30 UTC-03:00	Cícero 42'; Giva 67'	Report	(yellow card) 32' (goal) 50' Henrique; (yellow card) 37' Tiago Alves; (yellow card) 73' Roniery; 79' Wagninho	Stadium: Vila Belmiro; Attendance: 6,454; Referee: Guilherme Ceretta de Lima

31 March 16	Oeste	1–2	Santos	Bauru
18:30 UTC-03:00	Lelê (yellow card) 36'; Fernandes (yellow card) 45+1'; Antônio Carlos (yellow card) 74'; Hudson (yellow card) 80'; Fernando Leal (yellow card) 81'; Gilmar 85'	Report	(yellow card) 6' Renê Júnior; 66' Neymar; 86' Cícero	Stadium: Alfredão; Attendance: 12,559; Referee: Rodrigo Guarizo Ferreira do Amaral

4 April 17	Santos	1–1	São Caetano	São Paulo
19:30 UTC-03:00	Neymar (yellow card) 41' (goal) 52'; Durval (yellow card) 79'	Report	6' Jael; (yellow card) 27' Pirão; (yellow card) 36' Éder Prudêncio; (yellow card) 37' Moradei; (yellow card) 43' Bruno Aguiar; (yellow card) 60' Fábio	Stadium: Pacaembu; Attendance: 10,780; Referee: Antonio Rogério Batista do Prado

13 April 18	União Barbarense	0–4	Santos	Santa Barbara d'Oeste
18:30 UTC-03:00	Bruno Pires (yellow card) 21'; Rafael Silva (yellow card) 32'; Claúdio Britto (yellow card) 59'; Hélio (yellow card) 90+1'	Report	7', 26', 46', 50' Neymar; (yellow card) 29' Alan Santos; (yellow card) 43' Renê Júnior	Stadium: Estádio Antônio R. Guimarães; Attendance: 4018; Referee: Aurélio Santanna Martins

21 April 19	Santos	2–1	Penapolense	Santos
16:00 UTC-03:00	André (yellow card) 10' (goal) 25'; Cícero 28'; Rafael Galhardo (yellow card) 57'; Edu Dracena (yellow card) 59'	Report	53' Guarú; (yellow card) 83' Heleno; (yellow card) 89' Luís Felipe; (yellow card) 90+1' Eric	Stadium: Vila Belmiro; Attendance: 8,650; Referee: Luiz Flavio de Oliveira

==== Knockout stage ====
===== Quarter-final =====
27 April Quarter-final	Santos	1–1 (4–2 p)	Palmeiras	Santos
16:15 UTC-03:00	Cícero 13'; Renê Júnior (yellow card) 52'; Neto (yellow card) 76'	Report	(yellow card) 25' Henrique; (yellow card) 40' Márcio Araújo; 84' Kléber; (yellow card) 90+5' Wesley	Stadium: Vila Belmiro; Attendance: 14,172; Referee: Guilherme Ceretta de Lima
	Penalties
	Miralles (penalty scored); Cícero (penalty scored); Montillo (penalty scored); Renê Júnior (penalty scored)		(penalty missed) Kléber; (penalty scored) Souza; (penalty scored) Wesley; (penalty missed) Leandro
Note: Wesley was booked in the penalty shootout

===== Semi-final =====
4 May Semi-final	Mogi Mirim	1–1 (4–5 p)	Santos	Mogi Mirim
18:30 UTC-03:00	Roni 44'; Val (yellow card) 56'; Tiago Alves (yellow card) 57'; Roger (yellow card) 80'	Report	(yellow card) 18' Montillo; 76' Edu Dracena; (yellow card) 87' Renê Júnior	Stadium: Romildo Vitor Gomes Ferreira; Attendance: 16,645; Referee: Flávio Rodrigues Guerra
	Penalties
	Tiago Alves (penalty scored); Carlos Alberto (penalty missed); Roger (penalty scored); Juninho (penalty missed); Wagninho (penalty scored); Val (penalty scored); Roni (penalty missed)		(penalty missed) Miralles; (penalty scored) Cícero; (penalty missed) Renê Júnior; (penalty scored) André; (penalty scored) Neymar; (penalty scored) Léo; (penalty scored) Edu Dracena

===== Finals =====
12 May 1st leg	Corinthians	2–1	Santos	São Paulo
16:00 UTC-03:00	Paulinho 41'; Paulo André 74' (yellow card) 80'	Report	(yellow card) 45+1' Cícero; (yellow card) 77' Léo; 81' Durval	Stadium: Pacaembu; Attendance: 36,306; Referee: Wilson Luiz Seneme

19 May 2nd leg	Santos	1–1 (2–3 agg.)	Corinthians	Santos
16:00 UTC-03:00	Cícero 26'; Renê Júnior (yellow card) 77'; Arouca (yellow card) 90'	Report	(yellow card) 4' Fábio Santos; 28' Danilo; (yellow card) 60' Edenílson; (yellow card) 68' Cássio; (yellow card) 74' Romarinho	Stadium: Vila Belmiro; Attendance: 14,740; Referee: Guilherme Ceretta de Lima
