= 2013 Campeonato Paulista knockout stage =

The knockout stage of the 2013 Campeonato Paulista began on 27 April with the quarter-finals and concluded on 19 May 2013 with the final at Vila Belmiro in Santos.

== Round and draw dates ==
All draws held at Federação Paulista de Futebol headquarters in São Paulo, Brazil.

Round	Draw date	First leg	Second leg
Quarter-finals	22 April 2013	27, 28 April 2013	–
Semi-finals	29 April 2013	4, 5 May 2013	–
Finals	6 May 2013	12 May 2013	19 May 2013

== Format ==
The quarter-finals are played in one match at stadium of the best teams in the first phase. The 1st placed confronts the 8th, 2nd against the 7th, the 3rd against 6th and 4th against 5th. If no goals are scored during the match, the tie is decided by penalty shootout. The semi-finals are played in the same way of the quarter-finals. The final matches are played over two legs, with the best campaign team in previous stages playing the second match at home.

== Qualified teams ==
Pos	Team	Pld	W	D	L	GF	GA	GD	Pts
1	São Paulo	19	13	2	4	34	18	+16	41
2	Mogi Mirim	19	12	3	4	36	19	+17	39
3	Santos	19	11	6	2	35	21	+14	39
4	Ponte Preta	19	10	8	1	27	13	+14	38
5	Corinthians	19	9	8	2	31	16	+15	35
6	Palmeiras	19	9	7	3	34	24	+10	34
7	Botafogo-SP	19	9	4	6	26	23	+3	31
8	Penapolense	19	8	4	7	26	22	+4	28

Source: UOL Esporte
Rules for classification: 1) points; 2) goal difference; 3) number of goals scored.

== Bracket ==
Quarterfinals
1	São Paulo	1
8	Penapolense	0
4	Ponte Preta	0
5	Corinthians	4
2	Mogi Mirim	6
7	Botafogo–SP	0
3	Santos	1 (4)
6	Palmeiras	1 (2)

Semifinals
1	São Paulo	0 (3)
5	Corinthians	0 (4)
2	Mogi Mirim	1 (4)
3	Santos	1 (5)

Finals
5	Corinthians	2	1	3
3	Santos	1	1	2

== Quarter-finals ==
Team 1	Score	Team 2
Santos	1–1 (4–2 pen.)	Palmeiras
Mogi Mirim	6–0	Botafogo–SP
Ponte Preta	0–4	Corinthians
São Paulo	1–0	Penapolense

27 April
16:15 UTC-03:00

Santos	1 – 1	Palmeiras
Cícero 14'	Report	Kléber 84'
Penalties
Miralles (penalty scored); Cícero (penalty scored); Montillo (penalty scored); Renê Júnior (penalty scored)	4 – 2	(penalty missed) Kléber; (penalty scored) Souza; (penalty scored) Wesley; (penalty missed) Leandro

Estádio Urbano Caldeira (Vila Belmiro), Santos
Attendance: 14,172
Referee: Guilherme Ceretta de Lima

27 April
18:30 UTC-03:00

Mogi Mirim	6 – 0	Botafogo–SP
Tiago Alves 10'; Val 62'; Henrique 73', 79', 89'; Roni 76'	Report

Estádio Romildo Vitor Gomes Ferreira (Romildão), Mogi Mirim
Attendance: 5,240
Referee: Marcelo Aparecido Ribeiro de Souza

28 April
16:00 UTC-03:00

Ponte Preta	0 – 4	Corinthians
	Report	Romarinho 32'; Emerson 38'; Guerrero 56' (pen.); Pato 84'

Estádio Moisés Lucarelli (Majestoso), Campinas
Attendance: 12,460
Referee: Raphael Claus

28 April
18:30 UTC-03:00

São Paulo	1 – 0	Penapolense
Jailton 71' (o.g.)	Report

Estádio Cícero Pompeu de Toledo (Morumbi), São Paulo
Attendance: 32,995
Referee: Wilson Luiz Seneme

== Semi-finals ==
Team 1	Score	Team 2
Mogi Mirim	1–1 (4–5 pen.)	Santos
São Paulo	0–0 (3–4 pen.)	Corinthians

4 May
18:30 UTC-03:00

Mogi Mirim	1 – 1	Santos
Roni 44'	Report	Edu Dracena 76'
Penalties
Tiago Alves (penalty scored); Carlos Alberto (penalty missed); Roger (penalty scored); Juninho (penalty missed); Wagninho (penalty scored); Val (penalty scored); Roni (penalty missed)	4 – 5	(penalty missed) Miralles; (penalty scored) Cícero; (penalty missed) Renê Júnior; (penalty scored) André; (penalty scored) Neymar; (penalty scored) Léo; (penalty scored) Edu Dracena

Estádio Romildo Vitor Gomes Ferreira (Romildão), Mogi Mirim
Referee: Flávio Rodrigues Guerra

5 May
16:00 UTC-03:00

São Paulo	0 – 0	Corinthians
Penalties
Rogério Ceni (penalty scored); Toloi (penalty scored); Ganso (penalty missed); Jádson (penalty scored); Luís Fabiano (penalty missed)	3 – 4	(penalty scored) Douglas; (penalty scored) Romarinho; (penalty scored) Fábio Santos; (penalty missed) Alessandro; (penalty scored) Pato

Estádio Cícero Pompeu de Toledo (Morumbi), São Paulo
Attendance: 29,475
Referee: Antonio Rogério Batista do Prado

== Finals ==
Team 1	Agg.	Team 2	1st leg	2nd leg
Santos	2 – 3	Corinthians	1 – 2	1 – 1

12 May
16:00 UTC-03:00

Corinthians	2 – 1	Santos
Paulo André 41'; Paulinho 74'	Report	Durval 81'

Estádio Municipal Paulo Machado de Carvalho (Pacaembu), São Paulo
Referee: Wilson Luiz Seneme

19 May
16:00 UTC-03:00

Santos	1 – 1	Corinthians
Danilo 28'	Report	Cícero 26'

Estádio Urbano Caldeira (Vila Belmiro), Santos
Referee: Guilherme Cereta de Lima
