= DIS Esporte =

D.I.S. Esporte e Organização de Eventos LTDA. is a private football investment fund. It was set up by Rio Grande do Sul native Delcir Sonda and Idi Sonda. They operate one of the São Paulo state supermarket chains, Sonda.

DIS was the strategic partner of Santos FC until the club had a new president. The club sued the fund in order to void the sales of players from Santos to the fund; old Santos president Marcelo Teixeira was accused to sell the young players for un-economic price, but the court rejected the claim. The company paid R$3,203,000 for 25% economic rights of the youth players in 2008

== Investments ==
The following investment were known:

- Anderson Planta
- André (André Felipe Ribeiro de Souza) (?–2010)
- André Santos (2008–2009)
- Bananinha
- Breitner
- Breno (?–2007)
- Andrés D'Alessandro
- Danilo (Danilo Luiz da Silva) (2010–2011)
- Dentinho
- Diego Faria
- Gabriel Silva
- Ganso
- Juan (Juan Guilherme Nunes Jesus)
- Kléber (Kléber de Carvalho Corrêa)
- Neymar
- Nilmar (2007–2009)
- Renato (Renato de Araújo Chaves Júnior)
- Rafael Sóbis
- Thiago Neves (?–2008)
- Tiago Luís
- Tinga (Luiz Otávio Santos de Araújo)
- Vinícius ((Vinícius Santos Silva)
- Wesley (Wesley Lopes Beltrame) (?–2010)

== See also ==
- Third-party ownership in association football
