= Carlos França =

Brazilian footballer (born 1980)

Personal information
- Full name: Carlos Clay de França
- Date of birth: 1 January 1980 (age 46)
- Place of birth: Jaguariúna, Brazil
- Height: 1.81 m (5 ft 11 in)
- Position: Forward

Senior career*
Years	Team	Apps	(Gls)
2005	CE Europa		
2008	Chicago Fire Premier		
2009–2011	Caperanese/Chiavari	61	(46)
2011	Bogliasco	16	(6)
2011–2012	Legnago Salus	14	(4)
2012–2013	Lavagnese	33	(16)
2013–2014	RapalloBogliasco	32	(29)
2014–2015	Cuneo	36	(27)
2015–2016	Lecco	33	(27)
2016–2017	Triestina	31	(23)
2017–2020	Potenza	72	(39)
2020–2021	Seregno	0	(0)
2021	RG Ticino	8	(0)

Managerial career
- 2021: Seregno
- * Club domestic league appearances and goals as of 29 December 2021

Carlos Clay de França (born 1 January 1980) is a Brazilian association football coach and former player.

== Playing career ==
França started his European career playing for the small Barcelona-based club CE Europa. He scored a goal for the team to win a promotion to Tercera División in 2005. He suffered from a spinal tumor in 2006 that almost ended his football career. According to the footballer himself, he also played for Chicago Fire Premier and Chicago Storm. França scored a goal in the last group stage round in 2008 PDL season for Chicago Fire Premier against Michigan Bucks.

He was a player of Caperanese in the 2009–10 season, which won Serie D promotion in 2010 from Eccellenza Liguria (Italian sixth highest level until 2014; top level of Liguria region).

=== Serie D clubs ===
França remained in the squad of Caperanese in 2010–11 Serie D season. In May 2011, he joined Bogliasco.

França joined Cuneo in 2014.

França joined Lecco in 2015. In the following season, he joined fellow Serie D club Triestina.

After winning the Serie D promotion playoffs with Triestina, França signed a new contract with the club on 7 July 2017. The promotion of Triestina was confirmed on 4 August. However, on 31 August 2017, he returned to Serie D for Potenza. França played twice for Triestina in 2017–18 Coppa Italia and once at 2017–18 Coppa Italia Serie C.

=== Potenza ===
França was a player for Potenza since mid-2017. The team won promotion to Serie C as 2017–18 Serie D Group H winner. He also scored 25 league goals that season, as the second in the topscorer table of that group.

=== Seregno ===
On 17 August 2020 he moved to Seregno.

In November, he was sidelined due to a serious knee injury which required surgery.

=== RG Ticino ===
In August 2021, after having guided Seregno to Serie C as a head coach, França decided to accept an offer as a player for Serie D team RG Ticino. He successively left the club by the end of December and retired again from active football.

== Coaching career ==
On 2 March 2021, while still recovering from injury, his club Seregno announced to have promoted França as head coach of the Serie D club. Under his tenure, Seregno managed to climb up the table and win promotion to Serie C with one game still in hand, thus bringing back the Lombardian club to professional football for the first time since 1982. Despite his successes, on 24 July 2021 Seregno announced França was not confirmed as head coach for the club's upcoming Serie C campaign.

In the summer of 2023, França accepted an offer from Sampdoria to be the club's new under-18 coach. He successively worked as Under-19 coach at Pro Vercelli from July 2024 to January 2025.

== Honours ==
=== Player ===
club

- Serie D group stage winner: 2015 (Cuneo)
- Serie D group stage runner-up and promotion playoffs winner: 2017 (Triestina)
- Eccellenza group stage runner-up (Liguria) and promotion playoffs winner: 2010 (Caperanese)

individual

- Serie D Group A topscorer: 2015 (Cuneo)
- Eccellenza Liguria topscorer: 2010 (Caperanese)

=== Manager ===
Seregno

- Serie D Girone B: 2020–21

== Personal life ==
Cassiano Bodini is his brother-in-law.
