= Breitner =

Breitner is a surname. Notable people with the surname include:

- George Hendrik Breitner (1857–1923), Dutch painter and photographer
- Paul Breitner (born 1951), German footballer and commentator

== See also ==
- Breitner Da Silva (born 1989), Venezuelan footballer
