= Giva (footballer, born 1993) =

Brazilian footballer

Personal information
- Full name: Givanildo Pulgas da Silva
- Date of birth: 3 January 1993 (age 33)
- Place of birth: Cachoeira, Brazil
- Height: 1.87 m (6 ft 2 in)
- Position: Forward

Team information
- Current team: Retrô
- Number: 9

Youth career
- –2010: Santo André
- 2010–2012: Vitória
- 2012–2013: Santos

Senior career*
Years	Team	Apps	(Gls)
2013–2014	Santos	31	(6)
2015	Coritiba	6	(1)
2015–2016	Llagostera	13	(2)
2016	Água Santa	1	(0)
2016	Ponte Preta	6	(0)
2016	→ Joinville (loan)	10	(0)
2017	Náutico	1	(0)
2018	CSA	8	(1)
2018–2019	Badalona	14	(0)
2020	Goiânia	2	(1)
2020	Imperatriz	5	(4)
2020	ABC	6	(0)
2021	Figueirense	7	(0)
2021	Goiânia	2	(0)
2022–	Retrô	66	(21)
2023	→ Botafogo-PB (loan)	2	(0)
- * Club domestic league appearances and goals as of 8 July 2023

Givanildo Pulgas da Silva (born 3 January 1993), commonly known as Giva, is a Brazilian professional footballer who plays as a forward for Retrô.

== Career ==
=== Santos ===
Born in Cachoeira, Espírito Santo, Giva joined Santos FC's youth system in May 2012, after starting it out at EC Vitória. He progressed through the youth categories, and won 2013 Copa São Paulo de Futebol Júnior, being the club topscorer along with Neílton (4 goals each).

On 24 February 2013, Giva made his first team debut in a Campeonato Paulista game against XV de Piracicaba. On 21 March he scored his first professional goals, netting a brace in a 2–1 home win against Mirassol FC.

On 7 July, Giva made his Série A debut, starting and scoring the first of a 2–0 victory over São Paulo. Despite appearing regularly in 2013, he was rarely used in 2014.

=== Coritiba ===
On 30 December 2014, Giva signed for fellow league team Coritiba. He made his debut for the club on 31 January of the following year, coming on as a substitute in a 2–1 Campeonato Paranaense away win against Nacional.

Giva scored his first goal for the club on 27 May, netting the last in a 2–1 Copa do Brasil home win against Ponte Preta. He was released on 4 August, after making no league appearances for Coxa.

=== Llagostera ===
On 14 August 2015, Giva signed a two-year deal with Spanish Segunda División side UE Llagostera. On 18 January of the following year, after contributing with two goals in 11 games, he rescinded his link.

=== Náutico ===
On 2 January 2017, Giva signed with Náutico.

=== Badalona ===
After five months at Badalona, Giva left the club by mutual agreement on 1 February 2019. The player had asked to leave the club for personal reasons.

== Career statistics ==
As of 3 November 2023

Appearances and goals by club, season and competition
Club	Season	League			State League		Cup		Continental		Other		Total	
Club	Season	Division	Apps	Goals	Apps	Goals	Apps	Goals	Apps	Goals	Apps	Goals	Apps	Goals
Santos	2013	Série A	13	2	10	3	4	1	—		—		27	6
Santos	2014	Série A	2	0	0	0	2	0	—		—		4	0
Santos	Total		15	2	10	3	6	1	0	0	—		31	6
Coritiba	2015	Série A	1	0	3	0	2	1	—		—		6	1
Llagostera	2015–16	Segunda División	11	2	—		3	0	—		—		14	2
Água Santa	2016	Paulista	—		1	0	—		—		—		1	0
Ponte Preta	2016	Série A	4	0	—		2	0	—		—		6	0
Joinville	2016	Série B	10	0	—		—		—		—		10	0
Náutico	2017	Série B	1	0	9	0	—		—		3 (Note: Appearance(s) in Copa do Nordeste)	4	13	4
CSA	2018	Série B	0	0	8	1	2	1	—		4	1	14	3
Badalona	2018–19	Segunda División B	14	0	—		1	0	—		—		15	0
Goiânia	2020	Goiano	—		2	1	—		—		—		2	1
Imperatriz	2020	Série C	2	1	3	3	—		—		—		5	4
ABC	2020	Série D	6	0	—		—		—		—		6	0
Figueirense	2021	Série C	7	0	3	1	0	0	—		—		10	1
Goiânia	2021	Goiano 2ª Divisão	—		2	0	—		—		—		2	0
Retrô	2022	Série D	6	1	8	3	—		—		—		14	4
Retrô	2023	Série D	16	5	10	3	2	0	—		0	0	28	8
Retrô	Total		22	6	18	6	2	0	—		0	0	42	12
Botafogo–PB	2023	Série C	2	0	—		—		—		—		2	0
Career total			95	11	59	15	18	3	0	0	7	5	179	34

== Honours ==
Santos

- Copa São Paulo de Futebol Júnior: 2013

Retrô

- Campeonato Brasileiro Série D: 2024
