= Dudu (footballer, born 1982) =

Brazilian footballer

Personal information
- Full name: Carlos Eduardo Passos Farias
- Date of birth: 10 February 1982 (age 44)
- Place of birth: São Luís, Brazil
- Height: 1.79 m (5 ft 10 1/2 in)
- Position: Midfielder

Team information
- Current team: Mogi Mirim

Senior career*
| Years | Team | Apps | (Gls) |
| 2002–2006 | Moto Club | | |
| 2007–2012 | América Mineiro | | |
| 2013 | São Bernardo | | |
| 2013–2014 | São Caetano | | |
| 2014 | América–RN | | |
| 2015 | URT | | |
| 2015–2016 | Botafogo–SP | | |
| 2017– | Mogi Mirim | | |
- * Club domestic league appearances and goals as of 9 February 2017

Carlos Eduardo Passos Farias (born February 10, 1982), known as Dudu, is a Brazilian footballer who plays for Mogi Mirim as midfielder.

== Career statistics ==
As of 9 February 2017

| Club | Season | League | | | State League | | Cup | | Conmebol | | Other | | Total | |
| Club | Season | Division | Apps | Goals | Apps | Goals | Apps | Goals | Apps | Goals | Apps | Goals | Apps | Goals |
|---|---|---|---|---|---|---|---|---|---|---|---|---|---|---|
| América Mineiro | 2009 | Série C | 8 | 0 | 8 | 0 | — | | — | | — | | 16 | 0 |
| América Mineiro | 2010 | Série B | 31 | 4 | 8 | 0 | — | | — | | — | | 39 | 4 |
| América Mineiro | 2011 | Série A | 24 | 0 | 10 | 0 | — | | — | | — | | 34 | 0 |
| América Mineiro | 2012 | Série B | 25 | 2 | 5 | 0 | 2 | 0 | — | | — | | 32 | 2 |
| América Mineiro | Subtotal | | 88 | 6 | 31 | 0 | 2 | 0 | — | | — | | 121 | 6 |
| São Bernardo | 2013 | Paulista | — | | 15 | 1 | 2 | 0 | — | | — | | 17 | 1 |
| São Caetano | 2013 | Série B | 15 | 0 | — | | — | | — | | 4 (Note: All appearance(s) in Copa Paulista) | 0 | 19 | 0 |
| São Caetano | 2014 | Série C | — | | 0 | 0 | — | | — | | — | | 0 | 0 |
| São Caetano | Subtotal | | 15 | 0 | 0 | 0 | — | | — | | 4 | 0 | 19 | 0 |
| América–RN | 2014 | Série B | 3 | 0 | — | | — | | — | | — | | 3 | 0 |
| URT | 2015 | Mineiro | — | | 6 | 0 | — | | — | | — | | 6 | 0 |
| Botafogo–SP | 2015 | Série D | 9 | 0 | — | | — | | — | | — | | 9 | 0 |
| Botafogo–SP | 2016 | Série C | — | | 1 | 0 | — | | — | | — | | 1 | 0 |
| Botafogo–SP | Subtotal | | 9 | 0 | 1 | 0 | — | | — | | — | | 10 | 0 |
| Mogi Mirim | 2017 | Paulista A2 | — | | 3 | 0 | — | | — | | — | | 3 | 0 |
| Career total | | | 115 | 6 | 56 | 1 | 4 | 0 | 0 | 0 | 4 | 0 | 179 | 7 |
