= Vinicius Bovi =

Brazilian footballer

Personal information
- Full name: Vinicius Bueno Bovi
- Date of birth: 18 December 1981 (age 44)
- Place of birth: Limeira, Brazil
- Height: 1.80 m (5 ft 11 in)
- Position: Right back

Team information
- Current team: Veranópolis

Senior career*
Years	Team	Apps	(Gls)
2007–2008	Independente–SP		
2008–2009	Flamengo–SP		
2009	Atlético Sorocaba		
2010–2014	XV de Piracicaba		
2012	→ Mogi Mirim (loan)		
2013	→ Avaí (loan)		
2015	Rio Claro		
2015–2016	Independente–SP		
2017–	Veranópolis		
- * Club domestic league appearances and goals as of 20 February 2017

Vinicius Bueno Bovi (born 18 December 1981, in Limeira), known as Vinicius Bovi, is a Brazilian footballer who plays as right back.

== Career statistics ==
As of 20 February 2017

Club	Season	League			State League		Cup		Conmebol		Other		Total	
Club	Season	Division	Apps	Goals	Apps	Goals	Apps	Goals	Apps	Goals	Apps	Goals	Apps	Goals
Flamengo–SP	2009	Paulista A2	—		23	3	—		—		—		23	3
Atlético Sorocaba	2009	Paulista A2	—		—		—		—		13 (Note: All appearance(s) in Copa Paulista)	2	13	2
XV de Piracicaba	2010	Paulista A3	—		23	2	—		—		20	0	43	2
XV de Piracicaba	2011	Paulista A2	—		24	0	—		—		20	0	44	0
XV de Piracicaba	2012	Paulista	—		17	0	—		—		—		17	0
XV de Piracicaba	2013	Paulista	—		16	2	—		—		—		16	2
XV de Piracicaba	2014	Paulista	—		8	0	—		—		19	0	27	0
XV de Piracicaba	Subtotal		—		88	4	—		—		59	0	147	4
Mogi Mirim	2012	Série D	5	0	—		—		—		—		5	0
Avaí	2013	Série B	10	0	—		1	0	—		—		11	0
Rio Claro	2015	Paulista	—		15	0	—		—		—		15	0
Independente–SP	2015	Paulista A2	—		—		—		—		14	0	14	0
Independente–SP	2016	Paulista A2	—		18	1	—		—		—		18	1
Independente–SP	Subtotal		—		18	1	—		—		14	0	32	1
Veranópolis	2017	Gaúcho	—		3	0	—		—		—		3	0
Career total			15	0	147	8	1	0	0	0	86	2	249	10
