= Niel (footballer) =

Brazilian footballer

Personal information
- Full name: Antoniel dos Santos França
- Date of birth: 14 April 1979 (age 47)
- Place of birth: Timon, Brazil
- Position: Right back

Senior career*
Years	Team	Apps	(Gls)
1999–2003	Flamengo do Piauí		
2003	Tiradentes		
2004	Flamengo do Piauí		
2005	Ríver		
2005	América de Natal		
2006	Flamengo do Piauí		
2006	Potiguar		
2007	Ceará		
2007	Barras		
2007	Cascavel		
2007	Cori-Sabbá		
2008	Democrata		
2008	4 de Julho		
2008	Picos		
2009	Flamengo do Piauí		
2010	Mogi Mirim		
2010	Treze		
2011	Mogi Mirim		
2011	ASA		
2012–2013	Cuiabá		
2013	Flamengo do Piauí		
2013	Parnahyba		
2015	Piauí		
2016	Flamengo do Piauí		
- * Club domestic league appearances and goals as of 7 February 2017

Antoniel dos Santos França (born April 14, 1979 in Timon), known as Niel, is a Brazilian footballer who plays as right back.

== Career statistics ==
As of 7 February 2017

Club	Season	League			State League		Cup		Conmebol		Other		Total	
Club	Season	Division	Apps	Goals	Apps	Goals	Apps	Goals	Apps	Goals	Apps	Goals	Apps	Goals
Mogi Mirim	2010	Paulista	—		14	1	—		—		—		14	1
Treze	2010	Série D	8	0	—		—		—		—		8	0
Mogi Mirim	2011	Paulista	—		15	1	—		—		—		15	1
ASA	2011	Série B	4	0	—		—		—		—		4	0
Cuiabá	2012	Série C	13	0	—		2	0	—		—		15	0
Flamengo–PI	2013	Piauiense	—		—		2	0	—		—		2	0
Parnahyba	2013	Série D	7	1	—		—		—		—		7	1
Piauí	2015	Piauiense	—		5	0	1	1	—		—		6	1
Flamengo–PI	2016	Piauiense	—		8	0	—		—		4 (Note: All appearance(s) in Copa do Nordeste)	0	12	0
Career total			32	1	42	3	1	0	0	0	4	0	83	4

== Honours ==
Flamengo do Piauí

- Campeonato Piauiense: 2003, 2009
- Copa Piauí: 2009

Cuiabá

- Campeonato Mato-Grossense: 2013
