= Léo Maceió =

Brazilian footballer

Personal information
- Full name: Leonardo de Magalhães Visgueiro Pereira
- Date of birth: 11 August 1987 (age 39)
- Place of birth: Maceió, Brazil
- Position: Right back

Team information
- Current team: Flamengo–PI

Senior career*
Years	Team	Apps	(Gls)
2007	Camaçariense		
2008	América–SP		
2009–2012	CRB		
2011	→ Bahia de Feira (loan)		
2012	→ CSE (loan)		
2013	Flamengo–PI		
2013	Sete de Setembro		
2014	CSA		
2014–2015	Coruripe		
2015	Icasa		
2016	Jacuipense		
2017–	Flamengo–PI		
- * Club domestic league appearances and goals as of 9 February 2017

Leonardo de Magalhães Visgueiro Pereira (born August 11, 1987 in Maceió), known as Léo Maceió, is a Brazilian footballer who plays for Flamengo–PI as right back.

== Career statistics ==
As of 9 February 2017

Club	Season	League			State League		Cup		Conmebol		Other		Total	
Club	Season	Division	Apps	Goals	Apps	Goals	Apps	Goals	Apps	Goals	Apps	Goals	Apps	Goals
CRB	2009	Série C	5	0	5	0	—		—		—		10	0
CRB	2010	Série C	1	0	15	0	—		—		—		16	0
CRB	2011	Série C	2	0	—		—		—		—		2	0
CRB	Subtotal		8	0	20	0	—		—		—		28	0
Bahia de Feira	2011	Série D	—		20	0	—		—		—		20	0
CSE	2012	Alagoano	—		9	0	—		—		—		9	0
Flamengo–PI	2013	Piauiense	—		7	0	2	0	—		—		9	0
CSA	2014	Alagoano	—		7	0	0	0	—		0	0	7	0
Coruripe	2014	Série D	3	0	—		—		—		—		3	0
Coruripe	2015	Série D	—		10	0	2	0	—		5 (Note: All appearance(s) in Copa do Nordeste)	0	17	0
Coruripe	Subtotal		3	0	10	0	2	0	—		5	0	20	0
Icasa	2015	Série D	5	0	—		—		—		—		5	0
Jacuipense	2016	Baiano	—		2	0	—		—		—		2	0
Flamengo–PI	2017	Piauiense	—		1	0	—		—		—		1	0
Career total			16	0	76	0	4	0	0	0	5	0	101	0
