= Rodolfo Testoni =

Brazilian footballer

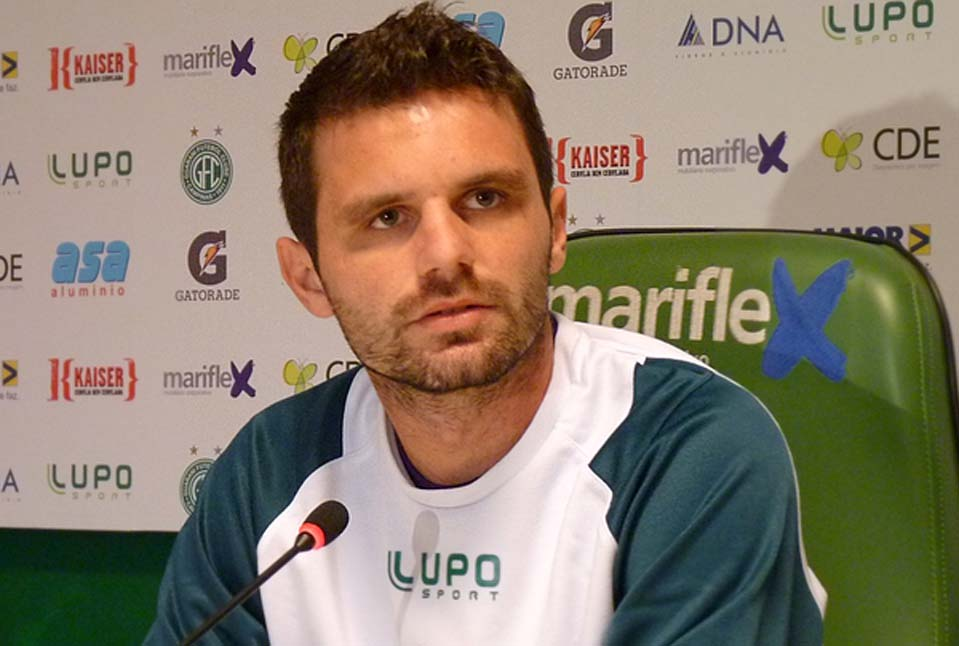

Personal information
- Full name: Rodolfo Custódio Testoni
- Date of birth: 15 December 1988 (age 37)
- Place of birth: Itajaí, Brazil
- Height: 1.79 m (5 ft 10 1/2 in)
- Position: Left back

Team information
- Current team: São Carlos

Senior career*
Years	Team	Apps	(Gls)
2006–2007	Camboriú		
2007	Deols		
2008	Guarani		
2008–2009	Foz do Iguaçu		
2009	Camboriú		
2010	Atibaia		
2010–2012	Camboriú		
2011	→ Operário–PR (loan)		
2012	São Carlos		
2013	Paulista		
2013	→ Guarani (loan)	4	(0)
2013	→ ABC (loan)	7	(0)
2014	Camboriú		
2015	Juventus		
2016	ASA		
2016	Juventus–SC		
2017–	São Carlos	17	(1)
- * Club domestic league appearances and goals as of 23 February 2017

Rodolfo Custódio Testoni (born December 15, 1988, in Itajaí), known as Rodolfo Testoni, is a Brazilian footballer who plays for São Carlos as left back.

== Paulistão 2013 ==
Rodolfo became popular when he played for Paulista in 2013. That year he was one of the best left backs in the Paulista A1 State Championship getting famous for his direct free kick shots with power and accuracy. His goal against Santos of Neymar (10/2/2013, Paulista won 1–3, Neymar scored Santos´goal) with a direct free kick shot from long distance was one of the best goals in the competition and had a global repercussion. His reputation as a free kick specialist started to grow when he scored another one against Atlético Sorocaba and he was unlucky in the games against Palmeiras and São Paulo where his direct free kick shots hit the bar in both games. But he proved against these giant clubs that his goals were not a matter of luck.

== Série B & C ==
His good appearances for Paulista opened the door for a transfer to a bigger club, the traditional Guarani which played at Série C and quickly to another traditional club, ABC Natal which played in the Série B of the Brasileirão. Testoni started the league as a starter, but a serious injury ruined his plans. After that he tried his luck in some well known teams of lower leagues in Brazil like Juventus from São Paulo State and ASA from Alagoas.

== São Carlos ==
In 2017 Rodolfo is having one of his best seasons in the Sâo Paulo state A3 Championship playing for Sâo Carlos. In 17 appearances he scored once with a direct free kick, was constant in the defence being one of the best players in the club and the best left back of the competition. He also gave 5 assists and was selected two times in the best XI of the competition. His contract ends in May 2017.

== Career statistics ==
As of 23 February 2017

Club	Season	League			State League		Cup		Conmebol		Other		Total	
Club	Season	Division	Apps	Goals	Apps	Goals	Apps	Goals	Apps	Goals	Apps	Goals	Apps	Goals
Operário–PR	2011	Série D	—		8	0	—		—		—		8	0
Camboriú	2012	Catarinense	—		16	0	—		—		—		16	0
Paulista	2013	Paulista	—		12	2	—		—		—		12	2
Guarani	2013	Série C	4	0	—		—		—		—		4	0
ABC	2013	Série B	7	0	—		—		—		—		7	0
Juventus	2015	Paulista A3	—		3	0	—		—		—		3	0
ASA	2016	Série C	—		4	1	—		—		—		4	1
São Carlos	2017	Paulista A3	—		17	1	—		—		—		17	1
Career total			11	0	48	3	10	0	0	0	0	0	59	3
