= Geovane (footballer, born 1992) =

Brazilian footballer

Personal information
- Full name: Geovane Batista Loubo
- Date of birth: 9 January 1992 (age 34)
- Place of birth: Teófilo Otoni, Brazil
- Height: 1.77 m (5 ft 9 1/2 in)
- Position: Midfielder

Youth career
- 2006: Cruzeiro
- 2006–2009: Santos
- 2009: Arsenal
- 2010: Santos

Senior career*
Years	Team	Apps	(Gls)
2011–2014	Santos	0	(0)
2011	→ América–TO (loan)	3	(0)
2013	→ Araxá (loan)		
2015	Foz do Iguaçu	7	(2)
2015	Mogi Mirim	3	(0)
- * Club domestic league appearances and goals as of 28 March 2017

Geovane Batista Loubo (born January 9, 1992, in Teófilo Otoni), known as Geovane, is a Brazilian footballer who plays as midfielder. He is known to have teamed with Neymar in Santos Academy. He played in Campeonato Brasileiro Série B for Mogi Mirim in 2015.
