= Neilton =

Brazilian footballer

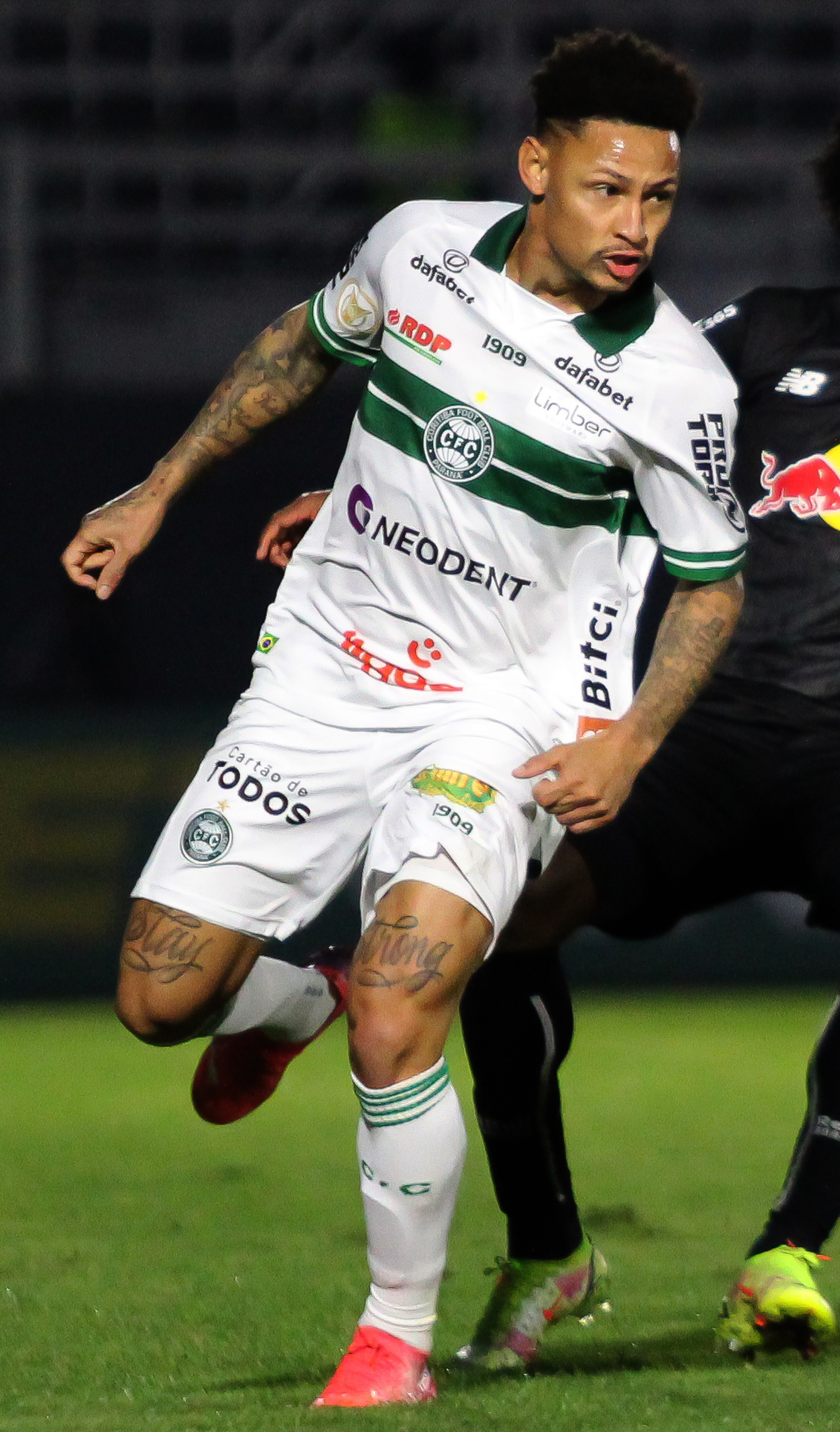
- Neilton with Coritiba in 2022

Personal information
- Full name: Neilton Meira Mestzk
- Date of birth: 17 February 1994 (age 32)
- Place of birth: Nanuque, Brazil
- Height: 1.66 m (5 ft 5 1/2 in)
- Position: Forward

Team information
- Current team: Água Santa

Youth career
- 2000–2008: ADC Basf Suvinil
- 2008–2014: Santos

Senior career*
Years	Team	Apps	(Gls)
2013–2014	Santos	22	(22)
2014–2017	Cruzeiro	12	(1)
2015–2016	→ Botafogo (loan)	46	(14)
2017	→ São Paulo (loan)	0	(0)
2017–2020	Vitória	62	(14)
2019	→ Internacional (loan)	16	(1)
2019–2020	Hatta	7	(1)
2020–2022	Coritiba	42	(21)
2021	→ Sport Recife (loan)	19	(2)
2023	Guarani	14	(2)
2023	Criciúma	2	(0)
2024–	Água Santa	0	(0)
- * Club domestic league appearances and goals as of 13 October 2023

Neilton Meira Mestzk (born 17 February 1994), commonly known as Neilton, is a Brazilian professional footballer who plays as a forward for Água Santa.

== Career ==
=== Santos ===
Neilton joined Santos' youth setup in 2008, aged 14. He was the club's topscorer in 2013 Copa São Paulo de Júnior, along with Giva. After his performances, he was a possible target to Premier League club Chelsea.

On 20 March, Neilton was promoted to first team and was named the "new Neymar". He made his first-team debut on the following day, in the Campeonato Paulista game against Mirassol. He made his Série A debut on 29 May, providing an assist to Walter Montillo's goal of a 1-2 defeat against Botafogo.

On 5 June, Neilton scored his first professional goal, in a 1-3 defeat against Criciúma. On 13 July, he scored twice in a 4-1 home routing over Portuguesa.

=== Cruzeiro ===
On 5 June 2014 Neilton signed a four-year deal with Cruzeiro. On 25 July of the following year, after being rarely used, he was loaned to Botafogo until the end of the year.

On 16 December 2015, Neilton's loan was renewed for a further year.

=== São Paulo ===
On 22 December 2016, São Paulo FC signed for one year with Neilton. Hudson, in other hand, goes to opposite side. On 13 May 2017, after poor performances, Neilton was dismissed by club.

== Career statistics ==
As of 3 January 2020

Club	Season	League			State League		Cup		Continental		Other		Total	
Club	Season	Division	Apps	Goals	Apps	Goals	Apps	Goals	Apps	Goals	Apps	Goals	Apps	Goals
Santos	2013	Série A	14	4	2	0	3	0	—		—		19	4
Cruzeiro	2014	Série A	1	0	0	0	3	0	—		—		4	0
Cruzeiro	2015	Série A	1	0	4	1	—		—		—		5	1
Cruzeiro	Subtotal		2	0	4	1	3	0	—		—		9	1
Botafogo	2015	Série B	18	6	—		—		—		—		18	6
Botafogo	2016	Série A	35	8	13	1	6	3	—		—		54	12
Botafogo	Subtotal		53	14	13	1	6	3	—		—		72	18
São Paulo	2017	Série A	0	0	6	0	2	0	1	0	—		9	0
Vitória	2017	Série A	30	7	—		—		—		—		30	7
Vitória	2018	Série A	32	7	12	7	7	4	—		5	3	56	21
Vitória	Subtotal		62	14	12	7	7	4	—		5	3	86	28
Internacional	2019	Série A	16	1	12	0	0	0	0	0	—		28	1
Total			139	30	49	9	18	6	1	0	4	3	181	48

== Honours ==
Cruzeiro

- Campeonato Brasileiro Série A: 2014

Botafogo

- Campeonato Brasileiro Série B: 2015
