= Cláudio Britto =

Brazilian footballer (born 1976)

Personal information
- Full name: Cláudio Vinícius dos Santos Britto
- Date of birth: 11 March 1976 (age 50)
- Place of birth: Porto Alegre, Brazil
- Height: 1.86 m (6 ft 1 in)
- Position: Midfielder

Senior career*
Years	Team	Apps	(Gls)
2006–2007	Atlético Sorocaba		
2007	Sertãozinho		
2008	Rio Branco de Andradas		
2008	Boa Esporte		
2009	Rio Branco de Andradas		
2009	Esportiva		
2010–2012	União Barbarense		
2012	Santo André		
2013–2014	União Barbarense		
- * Club domestic league appearances and goals as of 1 March 2017

Cláudio Vinícius dos Santos Britto (born March 11, 1976), known as Cláudio Britto, is a Brazilian footballer who plays as midfielder.

== Career statistics ==
As of 1 March 2017

Club	Season	League			State League		Cup		Conmebol		Other		Total	
Club	Season	Division	Apps	Goals	Apps	Goals	Apps	Goals	Apps	Goals	Apps	Goals	Apps	Goals
União Barbarense	2010	Paulista A2	—		15	0	—		—		—		15	0
União Barbarense	2011	Paulista A2	—		15	1	—		—		—		15	1
União Barbarense	2012	Paulista A2	—		16	1	—		—		—		16	1
União Barbarense	2013	Paulista	—		8	0	—		—		11 (Note: All appearance(s) in Copa Paulista)	0	19	0
União Barbarense	2014	Paulista A2	—		18	0	—		—		—		18	0
União Barbarense	Subtotal		—		72	2	—		—		11	0	83	2
Santo André	2012	Série C	16	0	—		—		—		—		16	0
Career total			16	0	72	2	0	0	0	0	11	0	97	2
