= Tiago Alves (footballer, born 1984) =

Brazilian footballer

Personal information
- Full name: Tiago dos Santos Alves
- Date of birth: 29 May 1984 (age 42)
- Place of birth: Belo Horizonte, Brazil
- Height: 1.86 m (6 ft 1 in)
- Position: Centre back

Senior career*
| Years | Team | Apps | (Gls) |
| 2007 | Vilavelhense | | |
| 2008–2010 | Icasa | | |
| 2008 | → Fortaleza (loan) | | |
| 2011–2013 | Mogi Mirim | 0 | (0) |
| 2011 | → ASA (loan) | 23 | (0) |
| 2012 | → Ponte Preta (loan) | 29 | (1) |
| 2013–2014 | Palmeiras | 10 | (0) |
| 2014 | → Ponte Preta (loan) | 27 | (3) |
| 2015–2017 | Ponte Preta | 71 | (6) |
| 2017 | Náutico | 14 | (0) |
| 2017–2018 | Red Bull Brasil | 15 | (0) |
| 2017 | → Ceará (loan) | 8 | (0) |
| 2018–2019 | Ceará | 53 | (3) |
| 2020 | Mirassol | 5 | (0) |
| 2020 | Oeste | 1 | (0) |
| 2021-2022 | Jacuipense-BA | 16 | (0) |
| 2022 | Vitória-ES | 0 | (0) |
- * Club domestic league appearances and goals as of 15:23, 13 April 2022 (UTC)

Tiago dos Santos Alves (born 29 May 1984), known as Tiago Alves, is a Brazilian professional footballer who plays as a central defender.

== Honours ==
Icasa

- Campeonato Cearense 2ª Divisão: 2010

ASA

- Campeonato Alagoano: 2011

Palmeiras

- Campeonato Brasileiro Série B: 2013
