= Diogo Medeiros =

Brazilian footballer (born 1985)

Personal information
- Full name: Diogo Justino Medeiros
- Date of birth: 8 July 1985 (age 41)
- Place of birth: Uberlândia, Brazil
- Height: 1.87 m (6 ft 2 in)
- Position: Midfielder

Senior career*
Years	Team	Apps	(Gls)
2008	Jataiense		
2008	Taboão da Serra		
2008–2010	São Caetano		
2010	→ Monte Azul (loan)		
2011	Icasa		
2011	Deportivo Quito		
2011–2012	Taboão da Serra		
2012	Carpina		
2013	Independente		
2013	CRAC	14	(0)
2013	Unitri		
2014	Batatais		
2014	CRAC	18	(0)
2015–	Independente		
- * Club domestic league appearances and goals as of 7 February 2017

Diogo Justino Medeiros (born July 8, 1985), known as Diogo Medeiros, is a Brazilian footballer who plays as midfielder for Independente. He already played for national competitions such as Copa do Brasil and Campeonato Brasileiro Série C.

== Career statistics ==
As of 7 February 2017

Club	Season	League			State League		Cup		Conmebol		Other		Total	
Club	Season	Division	Apps	Goals	Apps	Goals	Apps	Goals	Apps	Goals	Apps	Goals	Apps	Goals
Monte Azul	2010	Paulista	—		7	1	—		—		—		7	1
Taboão da Serra	2012	Paulista A3	—		14	4	—		—		—		14	4
Independente	2013	Paulista A3	—		20	11	—		—		—		20	11
CRAC	2013	Série C	14	0	—		2	0	—		—		16	0
Batatais	2014	Paulista A2	—		19	1	—		—		—		19	1
CRAC	2014	Série C	18	0	—		—		—		—		18	0
Independente	2015	Paulista A2	—		11	0	—		—		—		11	0
Independente	2016	Paulista A2	—		13	2	—		—		—		13	2
Independente	Subtotal		—		24	2	—		—		—		24	2
Career total			32	0	84	19	2	0	0	0	0	0	118	19
