= Henrique Mattos =

Brazilian footballer (born 1990)

Personal information
- Full name: Henrique Mendonça de Mattos
- Date of birth: 25 July 1990 (age 36)
- Place of birth: Ribeirão Preto, Brazil
- Height: 1.91 m (6 ft 3 in)
- Position: Centre-back

Team information
- Current team: Imperatriz

Youth career
- Botafogo–SP

Senior career*
Years	Team	Apps	(Gls)
2009–2014	Botafogo–SP	10	(0)
2014	→ Oeste (loan)	6	(0)
2014–2016	→ Sport (loan)	9	(0)
2017	Joinville	3	(1)
2018	Audax	0	(0)
2019	Campinense	5	(0)
2020–	Imperatriz	0	(0)
- * Club domestic league appearances and goals as of 19:17, 22 April 2020 (UTC)

Henrique Mendonça de Mattos (born July 25, 1990), known as Henrique Mattos, is a Brazilian footballer who plays for Imperatriz as centre-back.

== Career statistics ==
As of 14 February 2017

Club	Season	League			State League		Cup		Conmebol		Other		Total	
Club	Season	Division	Apps	Goals	Apps	Goals	Apps	Goals	Apps	Goals	Apps	Goals	Apps	Goals
Botafogo–SP	2009	Paulista	—		—		—		—		9 (Note: All appearance(s) in Copa Paulista)	0	9	0
Botafogo–SP	2010	Série D	6	0	0	0	—		—		—		6	0
Botafogo–SP	2011	Paulista	—		—		—		—		12	0	12	0
Botafogo–SP	2012	Paulista	—		4	0	—		—		4	1	8	1
Botafogo–SP	2013	Série D	4	0	9	0	—		—		—		13	0
Botafogo–SP	2014	Paulista	—		9	0	—		—		—		9	0
Botafogo–SP	Subtotal		10	0	22	0	—		—		25	1	57	1
Oeste	2014	Série B	6	0	—		—		—		—		6	0
Sport	2014	Série A	9	0	—		—		0	0	—		9	0
Sport	2015	Série A	0	0	3	0	1	0	—		—		4	0
Sport	Subtotal		9	0	3	0	1	0	0	0	—		13	0
Joinville	2017	Série C	—		4	0	—		—		1 (Note: All appearance(s) in Primeira Liga)	0	5	0
Career total			25	0	29	0	1	0	0	0	26	1	81	1
