= Hélio Batista (footballer, born 1990) =

Brazilian footballer

Personal information
- Full name: Hélio Monteiro Batista
- Date of birth: 28 January 1990 (age 36)
- Place of birth: Teresina, Brazil
- Height: 1.87 m (6 ft 2 in)
- Position: Defender

Team information
- Current team: Chiangrai United
- Number: 28

Youth career
- Santos
- 2008: Desportivo Brasil

Senior career*
Years	Team	Apps	(Gls)
2009–2011	Desportivo Brasil	?	(?)
2009–2010	→ Estoril Praia (loan)	0	(0)
2011	Rio Preto	16	(0)
2012	Noroeste	4	(0)
2013	União Barbarense	2	(0)
2013	Boa	1	(0)
2013	Comercial	0	(0)
2014	Capivariano	18	(1)
2014	Guarani	13	(0)
2015	Capivariano	8	(0)
2015–2016	Zimbru Chișinău	21	(2)
2016	Mirassol	0	(0)
2017	Caldense	10	(0)
2017	Desportivo Brasil	2	(0)
2018–2019	Ventspils	2	(0)
2020-2022	Zakho	40	(2)
2022-2025	Erbil	35	(0)
2025–	Chiangrai United	15	(3)
- * Club domestic league appearances and goals as of 9 January 2026

Hélio Monteiro Batista (born 28 January 1990), sometimes known as just Hélio, is a Brazilian footballer who plays as a defender for Thai League 1 club Chiangrai United.
