= Roger Gaúcho =

Brazilian footballer

Personal information
- Full name: Roger Roberto dos Santos
- Date of birth: 30 March 1986 (age 40)
- Place of birth: São Leopoldo, Brazil
- Height: 1.76 m (5 ft 9 in)
- Position: Attacking midfielder

Youth career
- 2006: Internacional

Senior career*
Years	Team	Apps	(Gls)
2007–2008	Internacional	19	(1)
2008	→ Náutico (loan)	4	(0)
2008	Porto Alegre	0	(0)
2009	Mirassol	18	(3)
2009–2013	São Caetano	33	(2)
2011	→ Oeste (loan)	22	(4)
2011	→ Santos (loan)	7	(0)
2012	→ Oeste (loan)	17	(2)
2012	→ Grêmio Barueri (loan)	7	(0)
2013	→ Mogi Mirim (loan)	16	(3)
2013–2014	Ponte Preta	6	(0)
2013–2014	→ Albirex Niigata (loan)	12	(2)
2014–2015	Oeste	19	(5)
2014	→ Criciúma (loan)	3	(0)
2014	→ Ceará (loan)	8	(2)
2016–2017	Campinense	16	(3)
2016	→ CRB (loan)	25	(2)
2017	Bucheon 1995	0	(0)
2017	Treze	11	(1)
2017	Botafogo-PB	12	(2)
2018	Altos	15	(0)
2018	Aimoré	5	(0)
2019	Real-DF	6	(1)
2019	América de Natal	17	(4)
2020	Portuguesa	15	(1)
2020	Oeste	0	(0)
2021	Altos	32	(0)
2021	Manauara	4	(2)
2022	ASA	24	(4)
2023	Capital	8	(2)
2023	Aimoré	11	(0)
2024	Altos	6	(0)
- * Club domestic league appearances and goals as of 14:53, 8 August 2024 (UTC)

Roger Roberto dos Santos (born 30 March 1986), known as Roger Gaúcho, is a Brazilian footballer who plays asn an attacking midfielder.

== Career ==
=== Internacional ===
Roger made his Campeonato Brasileiro debut for Internacional in a 1-1 draw with Atlético Mineiro on 30 June 2007.

=== Energy Sports ===
In August 2008 his contract was terminated and he left for Porto Alegre in September in short term deal, for 2008 Copa FGF. In December 2008 he signed a 5-year contract with Brasa Futebol Clube, a proxy for football agent Energy Sports (as well as act as an investor). He let for Mirassol, a partner of Energy Sports in temporary deal immediately.

=== São Caetano ===
In April 2009 he left for São Caetano in 1-year loan. In December 2009 São Caetano signed Roger in 3-year contract.

On 20 May 2011, Roger joined Santos FC in 3-month deal In June 2011 he added 1 more year to the contract with São Caetano. In 2012, he spent his career with Oeste and Grêmio Barueri.

In 2013, he was loaned to Mogi Mirim, the new partner of Energy Sports.

=== Ponte Preta ===
In May 2013 he was signed by Ponte Preta. 50% economic rights of Roger still retained by Energy Sports and other investors.

=== Albirex Niigata ===
On 29 July 2013, it was announced Roger had signed a new deal with J1 League team Albirex Niigata.

=== Bucheon FC 1995 ===
On 28 December 2016, South Korean club Bucheon FC 1995 announced that Roger signed a new contract with them.

On 22 February 2017, Roger Gaúcho's contract officially terminated by mutual consent before the season opening.

== Honours ==
Internacional

- Campeonato Gaúcho: 2008
