= Gleidson Souza =

Brazilian footballer (born 1984)

Personal information
- Full name: Gleidson Ricardo Brito de Souza
- Date of birth: 17 April 1984 (age 42)
- Place of birth: Sobradinho, Bahia, Brazil
- Height: 1.70 m (5 ft 7 in)
- Position: Left back

Team information
- Current team: Rio Preto

Senior career*
Years	Team	Apps	(Gls)
2003	Novo Hamburgo		
2003–2006	Criciúma		
2007	Veranópolis		
2007	São Caetano		
2007	Canoas		
2008	Brasiliense		
2008	Brasil de Pelotas		
2009	ABC		
2009	Brasil de Pelotas		
2009–2010	Duque de Caxias		
2011–2012	Noroeste		
2011	→ Paraná (loan)		
2012	→ Itumbiara (loan)		
2012	CRB		
2013	São Bernardo		
2013	Brasiliense		
2014	CRB		
2014	ABC		
2015	Mirassol		
2015–2016	CRB		
2016	América–RN		
2017–	Rio Preto		
- * Club domestic league appearances and goals as of 9 February 2017

Gleidson Ricardo Brito de Souza (born April 17, 1984), known as Gleidson Souza or simply Gleidson, is a Brazilian footballer who plays for Rio Preto as left back.

== Career statistics ==
As of 9 February 2017

Club	Season	League			State League		Cup		Conmebol		Other		Total	
Club	Season	Division	Apps	Goals	Apps	Goals	Apps	Goals	Apps	Goals	Apps	Goals	Apps	Goals
Brasil de Pelotas	2009	Série C	5	0	5	0	—		—		—		10	0
Duque de Caxias	2009	Série B	2	0	—		—		—		—		2	0
Duque de Caxias	2010	Série B	15	0	14	0	—		—		—		29	0
Duque de Caxias	Subtotal		17	0	14	0	—		—		—		31	0
Noroeste	2011	Paulista	—		16	0	—		—		—		16	0
Paraná	2011	Série B	10	2	—		—		—		—		10	2
Itumbiara	2012	Goiano	—		11	1	—		—		—		11	1
CRB	2012	Série B	23	3	—		—		—		—		23	3
São Bernardo	2013	Paulista	—		14	0	3	0	—		—		17	0
Brasiliense	2013	Série C	15	1	—		—		—		—		15	1
CRB	2014	Série C	4	0	12	0	4	0	—		6 (Note: All appearance(s) in Copa do Nordeste)	0	26	0
ABC	2014	Série B	1	0	—		—		—		—		1	0
Mirassol	2015	Paulista A2	—		7	0	—		—		—		7	0
CRB	2015	Série B	15	0	8	1	2	0	—		—		25	1
CRB	2016	Série B	—		7	0	0	0	—		0	0	7	0
CRB	Subtotal		15	0	15	1	2	0	—		0	0	32	1
América–RN	2016	Série B	3	0	—		—		—		—		3	0
Rio Preto	2017	Paulista A2	—		1	0	—		—		—		1	0
Career total			93	6	95	2	9	0	0	0	6	0	203	8
