= Pirão =

Brazilian footballer

Personal information
- Full name: Manoel Almeida Júnior
- Date of birth: 31 December 1985 (age 40)
- Place of birth: Campos dos Goytacazes, Brazil
- Height: 1.85 m (6 ft 1 in)
- Position: Left back

Team information
- Current team: Madureira
- Number: 7

Senior career*
Years	Team	Apps	(Gls)
2005–2009	Americano		
2006	→ Macaé (loan)		
2006	→ Cardoso Moreira (loan)		
2007	→ Jaguaré (loan)		
2008	→ São João da Barra (loan)		
2009–2012	Ponte Preta	49	(2)
2011	→ Criciúma (loan)	27	(3)
2012	→ Avaí (loan)	32	(3)
2013–2014	São Caetano	16	(0)
2014	→ Chapecoense (loan)	0	(0)
2015	CRB	0	(0)
2015	Boa Esporte	22	(1)
2016	Tupi	0	(0)
2016	Desportiva	5	(0)
2017–	Madureira	0	(0)
- * Club domestic league appearances and goals as of 3 March 2017

Manoel Almeida Júnior (born December 31, 1985, in Campos dos Goytacazes), known by his nickname Pirão, is a Brazilian footballer who plays for Madureira as left back.

== Career statistics ==
As of 3 March 2017

Club	Season	League			State League		Cup		Conmebol		Other		Total	
Club	Season	Division	Apps	Goals	Apps	Goals	Apps	Goals	Apps	Goals	Apps	Goals	Apps	Goals
Americano	2008	Carioca	—		13	0	—		—		—		13	0
Americano	2009	Carioca	—		4	0	5	0	—		—		9	0
Americano	Subtotal		—		17	0	5	0	—		—		22	0
Ponte Preta	2009	Série B	25	2	—		—		—		—		25	2
Ponte Preta	2010	Série B	24	0	9	0	1	0	—		—		34	0
Ponte Preta	Subtotal		49	2	9	0	1	0	—		—		59	2
Criciúma	2011	Série B	27	3	20	4	—		—		—		47	7
Avaí	2012	Série B	32	3	17	4	—		—		—		49	7
São Caetano	2013	Série B	16	0	11	0	1	0	—		3 (Note: All appearance(s) in Copa Paulista)	0	31	0
Chapecoense	2014	Série A	—		5	0	—		—		—		5	0
CRB	2015	Série B	—		1	0	—		—		4 (Note: All appearance(s) in Copa do Nordeste)	0	5	0
Boa Esporte	2015	Série B	22	1	—		—		—		—		22	1
Tupi	2016	Série B	—		5	0	—		—		—		5	0
Desportiva	2016	Série D	5	0	—		—		—		—		5	0
Career total			151	9	85	8	7	0	0	0	7	0	250	17
