= Da Silva (footballer, born 1991) =

Brazilian footballer

Personal information
- Full name: Elry Enio Bezerra da Silva
- Date of birth: 26 June 1991 (age 35)
- Height: 1.76 m (5 ft 9 1/2 in)
- Position: Midfielder

Team information
- Current team: Barbalha

Youth career
- 2009: Porto–PE
- 2009–2010: Ferroviária

Senior career*
| Years | Team | Apps | (Gls) |
| 2011 | Vitória–PE | 0 | (0) |
| 2011 | Luziânia | 0 | (0) |
| 2012 | Bahia de Feira | 0 | (0) |
| 2012 | Icasa | 13 | (0) |
| 2013 | Atlético Sorocaba | 0 | (0) |
| 2013–2015 | Icasa | 31 | (0) |
| 2016 | Rio Branco | 0 | (0) |
| 2016 | Treze | 0 | (0) |
| 2016–2018 | Guarani de Juazeiro | 10 | (0) |
| 2019– | Barbalha | 0 | (0) |
- * Club domestic league appearances and goals as of 7 February 2019

Elry Enio Bezerra da Silva (born 26 June 1991), known as Da Silva, is a Brazilian footballer who plays for Barbalha as a midfielder.

== Career statistics ==
As of 1 March 2017

| Club | Season | League | | | State League | | Cup | | Continental | | Other | | Total | |
| Club | Season | Division | Apps | Goals | Apps | Goals | Apps | Goals | Apps | Goals | Apps | Goals | Apps | Goals |
|---|---|---|---|---|---|---|---|---|---|---|---|---|---|---|
| Vitória–PE | 2011 | Pernambucano | — | | 20 | 0 | — | | — | | — | | 20 | 0 |
| Bahia de Feira | 2012 | Baiano | — | | 3 | 1 | — | | — | | — | | 3 | 1 |
| Icasa | 2012 | Série C | 13 | 0 | — | | — | | — | | — | | 13 | 0 |
| Atlético Sorocaba | 2013 | Paulista | — | | 17 | 0 | — | | — | | — | | 17 | 0 |
| Icasa | 2013 | Série B | 22 | 0 | — | | — | | — | | — | | 22 | 0 |
| Icasa | 2014 | Série B | 1 | 0 | — | | — | | — | | — | | 1 | 0 |
| Icasa | 2015 | Série C | 8 | 0 | 2 | 0 | 0 | 0 | — | | — | | 10 | 0 |
| Icasa | Subtotal | | 31 | 0 | 2 | 0 | 0 | 0 | — | | — | | 33 | 0 |
| Rio Branco | 2016 | Paulista A2 | — | | 3 | 0 | — | | — | | — | | 3 | 0 |
| Treze | 2016 | Paraibano | — | | 1 | 0 | — | | — | | — | | 1 | 0 |
| Guarani de Juazeiro | 2016 | Série D | — | | — | | — | | — | | 7 (Note: All appearance(s) in Copa Fares Lopes) | 0 | 7 | 0 |
| Guarani de Juazeiro | 2017 | Cearense | — | | 5 | 0 | 1 | 0 | — | | — | | 6 | 0 |
| Guarani de Juazeiro | Subtotal | | — | | 5 | 0 | 1 | 0 | — | | 7 | 0 | 13 | 0 |
| Career total | | | 44 | 0 | 51 | 1 | 1 | 0 | 0 | 0 | 7 | 0 | 103 | 1 |
