= Pantico =

Brazilian footballer (born 1980)

Personal information
- Full name: Francisco das Chagas Rodrigues Batista
- Date of birth: 10 December 1980 (age 45)
- Place of birth: Oeiras, Brazil
- Height: 1.65 m (5 ft 5 in)
- Position: Forward

Senior career*
Years	Team	Apps	(Gls)
2003	Oeiras		
2003	São Caetano		
2003	Caxiense		
2005	Quixadá		
2006	Ríver		
2006	Parnahyba		
2007	Vitória		
2007	Barras		
2008	Bahia		
2008	Vitória da Conquista		
2008	Bragantino		
2009	CRAC		
2009–2010	Icasa	15	(4)
2010	Brusque		
2010–2011	Joinville	9	(3)
2011	Brusque	2	(0)
2011	Caxias	4	(2)
2012	Metropolitano	1	(1)
2012	Paysandu	6	(1)
2013	Ríver		
2013	CRAC	12	(0)
2014	Anápolis		
2014	Fast Clube		
2015	Socorrense		
2015	Oeiras		
2016–	Altos	3	(0)
- * Club domestic league appearances and goals as of 7 February 2017

Francisco das Chagas Rodrigues Batista (born December 10, 1980), known by his nickname Pantico, is a Brazilian footballer who plays as forward for Altos.

== Career statistics ==
As of 7 February 2017

Club	Season	League			State League		Cup		Conmebol		Other		Total	
Club	Season	Division	Apps	Goals	Apps	Goals	Apps	Goals	Apps	Goals	Apps	Goals	Apps	Goals
Independente	2009	Série C	10	4	—		—		—		—		10	4
Independente	2010	Série B	5	0	—		—		—		—		5	0
Independente	Subtotal		15	4	—		—		—		—		15	4
Joinville	2010	Série D	9	3	—		—		—		—		9	3
Joinville	2011	Série C	—		11	3	—		—		—		11	3
Joinville	Subtotal		9	3	11	3	—		—		—		20	6
Brusque	2011	Série D	2	0	—		—		—		—		2	0
Caxias	2012	Série C	4	2	—		—		—		—		4	2
Metropolitano	2012	Série D	1	1	12	2	—		—		—		13	3
Paysandu	2012	Série C	6	1	—		—		—		—		6	1
CRAC	2013	Série C	12	0	9	4	5	3	—		—		26	7
Anápolis	2014	Goiano	—		7	0	—		—		—		7	0
Socorrense	2015	Sergipano	—		7	2	—		—		1 (Note: All appearance(s) in Copa do Nordeste)	1	7	0
Altos	2016	Série D	3	0	19	3	—		—		—		22	3
Career total			52	11	65	14	5	3	0	0	1	1	123	29
