= Franci (footballer) =

Brazilian footballer (born 1990)

Personal information
- Full name: Valmir Aparecido Franci de Campos Júnior
- Date of birth: 16 April 1990 (age 36)
- Place of birth: Capivari, Brazil
- Height: 1.78 m (5 ft 10 in)
- Position: Forward

Team information
- Current team: Vila Nova

Youth career
- 2008–2009: Rondoniense
- 2009: Atlético Mineiro

Senior career*
Years	Team	Apps	(Gls)
2010	Votoraty	6	(0)
2011	Monte Azul	12	(1)
2011	Tupi	2	(0)
2011	Jaboticabal	0	(0)
2012	Paranavaí	12	(3)
2012–2013	Botafogo-SP	19	(2)
2013–2014	Joinville	25	(2)
2014	Boa Esporte	10	(0)
2015	Capivariano	17	(3)
2015	Botafogo-SP	14	(6)
2015–2019	Vitória de Guimarães	7	(0)
2017	→ Botafogo-SP (loan)	22	(6)
2018	→ Novorizontino (loan)	17	(3)
2018	→ São Bento (loan)	15	(7)
2019	→ Albirex Niigata (loan)	30	(8)
2020	Botafogo-SP	4	(0)
2020	Vila Nova	4	(0)
2021	Coimbra	5	(0)
2022	São Bento	12	(0)
2023	São Caetano	13	(2)
2024–	Independente FSJ	5	(0)
- * Club domestic league appearances and goals as of 12 December 2024

Valmir Aparecido Franci de Campos Júnior (born April 16, 1990), known as Franci, is a Brazilian footballer who plays as a forward for Independente FSJ.

== Career statistics ==
As of 14 February 2017

Club	Season	League			State League		Cup		Conmebol		Other		Total	
Club	Season	Division	Apps	Goals	Apps	Goals	Apps	Goals	Apps	Goals	Apps	Goals	Apps	Goals
Votoraty	2010	Paulista A2	—		6	0	2	0	—		—		8	0
Monte Azul	2011	Paulista A2	—		12	1	—		—		—		12	1
Tupi	2011	Série D	2	0	—		—		—		—		2	0
Jaboticabal	2011	Paulista B	—		2	0	—		—		—		2	0
Paranavaí	2012	Paranaense	—		12	3	—		—		—		12	3
Botafogo–SP	2012	Paulista	—		—		—		—		15 (Note: Appearance in Copa Paulista)	7	15	7
Botafogo–SP	2013	Série D	—		19	2	—		—		—		19	2
Botafogo–SP	Subtotal		—		19	2	—		—		15	7	34	9
Joinville	2013	Série B	12	1	—		—		—		—		12	1
Joinville	2014	Série B	1	0	11	1	2	0	—		—		14	1
Joinville	Subtotal		13	1	11	1	2	0	—		—		26	2
Boa Esporte	2014	Série B	10	0	—		—		—		—		10	0
Capivariano	2015	Paulista	—		14	3	3	0	—		—		17	3
Botafogo–SP	2015	Série D	14	6	—		—		—		—		14	6
Vitória de Guimarães	2015–16	Primeira Liga	7	0	—		—		—		1 (Note: Appearance in Taça da Liga)	0	8	0
Vitória de Guimarães B	2015–16	LigaPro	5	0	—		—		—		—		5	0
Botafogo–SP	2017	Série C	—		1	1	—		—		—		1	1
Career total			51	7	77	11	7	0	0	0	16	7	151	25
