= Val (footballer, born 1983) =

Brazilian footballer

Personal information
- Full name: Lucivaldo Lázaro de Abreu
- Date of birth: 22 August 1983 (age 43)
- Place of birth: Natal, Brazil
- Height: 1.82 m (6 ft 0 in)
- Position: Midfielder

Team information
- Current team: Força e Luz

Senior career*
Years	Team	Apps	(Gls)
2005–2006	Baraúnas		
2007–2009	Porto–PE		
2008	→ Santa Cruz–RN (loan)		
2008	→ Cruzeiro–RN (loan)		
2009	Alecrim		
2010	Botafogo–PB		
2011	Mogi Mirim		
2011	América–RN	13	(2)
2012–2013	Mogi Mirim	12	(1)
2012	→ Bahia (loan)	0	(0)
2013–2015	Flamengo	12	(0)
2014	→ América–RN (loan)	10	(0)
2015	→ Mogi Mirim (loan)	0	(0)
2016–2017	Botafogo–PB	20	(1)
2018	Cruzeiro-RN	0	(0)
2019	Palmeira	0	(0)
2019	Vitória das Tabocas	6	(0)
2020–	Força e Luz	0	(0)
- * Club domestic league appearances and goals as of 19 January 2017

Lucivaldo Lázaro de Abreu (born August 22, 1983, in Natal), known as Val, is a Brazilian footballer who plays as midfielder for Centro Esportivo Força e Luz.

== Career statistics ==
As of 2 March 2017

Club	Season	League			State League		Cup		Conmebol		Other		Total	
Club	Season	Division	Apps	Goals	Apps	Goals	Apps	Goals	Apps	Goals	Apps	Goals	Apps	Goals
Mogi Mirim	2011	Paulista	—		16	3	—		—		—		16	3
América–RN	2011	Série C	13	2	—		—		—		—		13	2
Mogi Mirim	2012	Série D	12	1	21	3	—		—		—		33	4
Mogi Mirim	2013	Série C	—		16	2	—		—		—		16	2
Mogi Mirim	Subtotal		12	1	37	5	—		—		—		49	6
Flamengo	2013	Série A	12	0	—		2	0	—		—		14	0
Flamengo	2014	Série A	—		2	0	—		—		—		2	0
Flamengo	Subtotal		12	0	2	0	2	0	—		—		16	0
América–RN	2014	Série B	10	0	9	1	7	0	—		2 (Note: All appearance(s) in Copa do Nordeste)	0	28	1
Mogi Mirim	2015	Série B	—		11	0	—		—		—		11	0
Botafogo–PB	2016	Série C	15	1	12	3	3	0	—		4	0	34	4
Career total			62	4	87	12	12	0	0	0	6	0	167	16

== Honours ==
Flamengo

- Copa do Brasil: 2013

América de Natal

- Campeonato Potiguar: 2014

Botafogo da Paraíba

- Campeonato Paraibano: 2017
