= Rafinha (footballer, born 11 August 1988) =

Brazilian footballer

Personal information
- Full name: Rafael Viana de Melo
- Date of birth: 11 August 1988 (age 38)
- Place of birth: Santana do Ipanema, Brazil
- Height: 1.70 m (5 ft 7 in)
- Position: Left back

Senior career*
Years	Team	Apps	(Gls)
2007–2012	CRB	13	(0)
2007	→ Votoraty (loan)		
2008	→ ASA (loan)		
2009	→ Cristal (loan)		
2010	→ Ipatinga (loan)	2	(0)
2012	→ Caldense (loan)	0	(0)
2013	Flamengo–PI	0	(0)
2013	Coruripe	0	(0)
2014	Anapolina	0	(0)
2015	Serra Talhada	0	(0)
2015–2016	Ríver	13	(0)
2017–	Bahia de Feira	0	(0)
- * Club domestic league appearances and goals as of 8 February 2017

Rafael Viana de Melo (born August 11, 1988, in Santana do Ipanema), known as Rafinha, is a Brazilian footballer who plays for Bahia de Feira as left back. He already played for national competitions such as Copa do Brasil and Campeonato Brasileiro Série B.

== Career statistics ==
As of 8 February 2017

Club	Season	League			State League		Cup		Conmebol		Other		Total	
Club	Season	Division	Apps	Goals	Apps	Goals	Apps	Goals	Apps	Goals	Apps	Goals	Apps	Goals
CRB	2009	Série C	5	0	—		—		—		—		5	0
CRB	2010	Série C	3	0	—		—		—		—		3	0
CRB	2011	Série C	4	0	—		—		—		—		4	0
CRB	2012	Série B	1	0	—		—		—		—		1	0
CRB	Subtotal		13	0	—		—		—		—		13	0
Ipatinga	2010	Série B	2	0	—		—		—		—		2	0
Flamengo–PI	2013	Piauiense	—		—		2	0	—		—		2	0
Anapolina	2014	Série D	—		11	0	—		—		—		11	0
Serra Talhada	2015	Série D	—		17	0	—		—		—		17	0
Ríver	2015	Série D	—		8	1	—		—		—		8	1
Ríver	2016	Série C	13	0	6	1	0	0	—		0	0	19	1
Ríver	Subtotal		13	0	14	2	0	0	—		0	0	27	2
Bahia de Feira	2017	Baiano	—		1	0	—		—		—		1	0
Career total			28	0	43	2	2	0	0	0	0	0	73	2
