= Diogo Calixto =

Brazilian footballer (born 1993)

Personal information
- Full name: Diogo Lima Calixto
- Date of birth: 26 January 1993 (age 33)
- Place of birth: Pindamonhangaba, Brazil
- Height: 1.83 m (6 ft 0 in)
- Position: Left back

Team information
- Current team: Inter de Limeira

Youth career
- 2009–2012: Mirassol
- 2010: → Atlético Mineiro (loan)

Senior career*
Years	Team	Apps	(Gls)
2013	Mirassol	0	(0)
2014	Botafogo–SP	0	(0)
2014	Ituano	7	(0)
2015–2016	Velo Clube	0	(0)
2017–	Inter de Limeira	0	(0)
- * Club domestic league appearances and goals as of 1 March 2017

Diogo Lima Calixto (born 26 January 1993), sometimes known as just Diogo or Calixto, is a Brazilian footballer who plays for Inter de Limeira as a left back.

== Career statistics ==
As of 1 March 2017

Club	Season	League			State League		Cup		Continental		Other		Total	
Club	Season	Division	Apps	Goals	Apps	Goals	Apps	Goals	Apps	Goals	Apps	Goals	Apps	Goals
Mirassol	2013	Paulista	—		6	0	—		—		—		6	0
Botafogo–SP	2014	Paulista	—		4	0	—		—		—		4	0
Ituano	2014	Série D	7	0	—		—		—		—		7	0
Velo Clube	2015	Paulista A2	—		15	0	—		—		—		15	0
Velo Clube	2016	Paulista A2	—		14	0	—		—		—		14	0
Velo Clube	Subtotal		—		29	0	—		—		—		29	0
Inter de Limeira	2017	Paulista A3	—		2	0	—		—		—		2	0
Career total			7	0	41	0	0	0	0	0	0	0	48	0
