= Estádio Vail Chaves =

Coordinates: 22°26′22.71″S 46°57′45.22″W

- Interactive map of Estádio Vail Chaves
- Full name: Estádio Vail Chaves
- Former names: Estádio Romildo Vitor Gomes Ferreira; Estádio Papa João Paulo II; Estádio Wilson Fernandes de Barros; Estádio Vail Chaves
- Location: Mogi Mirim, São Paulo Brazil
- Owner: Mogi Mirim Esporte Clube
- Capacity: 19,900
- Surface: Natural grass
- Field size: 105 by 68 metres (114.8 yd × 74.4 yd)

Construction
- Built: 1991
- Opened: July 7, 1991

Tenant
- Mogi Mirim Esporte Clube

Estádio Vail Chaves, is a multi-purpose stadium in Mogi-Mirim, São Paulo, Brazil. It is currently used mostly for football matches. The stadium has a capacity of 19,900 people.

Estádio Vail chaves is owned by Mogi Mirim Esporte Clube.

== History ==
In 1991, the works on the stadium were completed. It was named Estádio Wilson Fernandes de Barros, after a Mogi Mirim Esporte Clube's president, and city's mayor. The inaugural match was played on July 7 of that year, when Mogi Mirim beat Palmeiras 4–2. The first goal of the stadium was scored by Mogi Mirim's Demetrius.
