= Cassiano Bodini =

Brazilian footballer (born 1983)

Personal information
- Full name: Carlos Cassiano Bodini
- Date of birth: 6 September 1983 (age 43)
- Place of birth: Jaguariúna, Brazil
- Height: 1.72 m (5 ft 8 in)
- Position: Forward

Team information
- Current team: Rio Claro

Senior career*
Years	Team	Apps	(Gls)
2002	Marcílio Dias		
2002–2003	Lazio Calcio a 5		
2004	Marcílio Dias		
2004–2005	Pontevecchio		
2005–2006	Ancona		
2006–2007	Cuoiopelli		
2007–2010	Virtus Entella		
2010	Chiavari		
2011	Ypiranga		
2011–2013	Paulista		
2013	São Caetano	8	(1)
2014	Comercial–SP		
2014	Juventude	12	(3)
2015	Atlético Ibirama		
2015	Juventude	2	(0)
2015–2016	Lecco	10	(2)
2016–2017	Pergolettese	24	(11)
2017	Ciliverghe Mazzano	6	(1)
2017–2018	Legnago Salus	11	(4)
2018–2019	Lumignacco Calcio		
2019–	Rio Claro	0	(0)
- * Club domestic league appearances and goals as of 4 March 2018

Carlos Cassiano Bodini (born 6 September 1983), known as Cassiano Bodini, is a Brazilian footballer who plays for Rio Claro as forward.

== Career statistics ==
As of 21 February 2017

Appearances and goals by club, season and competition
Club	Season	League			State League		Cup		Conmebol		Other		Total	
Club	Season	Division	Apps	Goals	Apps	Goals	Apps	Goals	Apps	Goals	Apps	Goals	Apps	Goals
Ypiranga	2011	Gaúcho	—		4	0	1	0	—		—		5	0
Paulista	2011	Paulista	—		—		—		—		8 (Note: Appearance(s) in Copa Paulista)	1	8	1
Paulista	2012	Paulista	—		6	0	2	0	—		12	2	20	2
Paulista	2013	Paulista	—		18	3	—		—		—		18	3
Paulista	Total		0	0	24	3	2	0	0	0	20	3	46	6
São Caetano	2013	Série B	8	1	—		—		—		5	1	13	2
Comercial–SP	2014	Paulista	—		8	0	—		—		—		8	0
Juventude	2014	Série C	12	3	—		—		—		—		12	3
Atlético Ibirama	2015	Catarinense	—		7	2	—		—		—		7	2
Juventude	2015	Série C	2	0	—		—		—		—		2	0
Career total			22	4	43	5	3	0	0	0	25	4	93	13
