= Wesley (footballer, born 1987) =

Brazilian footballer

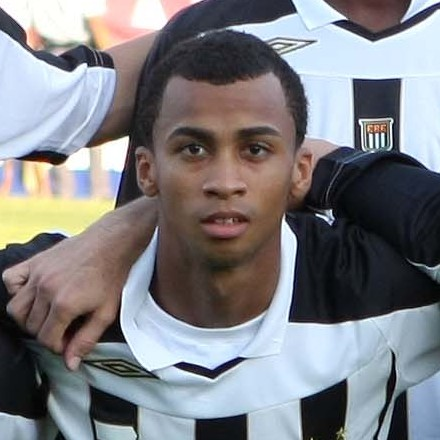
- Wesley with Santos in 2008

Personal information
- Full name: Wesley Lopes Beltrame
- Date of birth: 24 June 1987 (age 39)
- Place of birth: Catanduva, Brazil
- Height: 1.79 m (5 ft 10 in)
- Position: Midfielder

Youth career
- 2005–2006: Botafogo-SP
- 2006: Santos

Senior career*
| Years | Team | Apps | (Gls) |
| 2007–2010 | Santos | 56 | (8) |
| 2009 | → Atlético Paranaense (loan) | 33 | (2) |
| 2010–2012 | Werder Bremen | 26 | (2) |
| 2012–2015 | Palmeiras | 89 | (12) |
| 2015–2017 | São Paulo | 62 | (2) |
| 2017 | Sport Recife | 9 | (0) |
| 2018 | América Mineiro | 19 | (0) |
| 2019 | Criciúma | 35 | (0) |
| 2020 | Avaí | 12 | (0) |
| 2020–2022 | CRB | 22 | (5) |
| 2022–2023 | Ponte Preta | 11 | (0) |

International career
| 2010 | Brazil | 2 | (0) |
- * Club domestic league appearances and goals

Wesley Lopes Beltrame (born 24 June 1987), simply known as Wesley, is a Brazilian former professional footballer who played as a central or defensive midfielder.

== Club career ==
=== Santos ===
Wesley began his career in 2006 with Santos, and was promoted to the senior side in 2007, where he played four games. In 2008, Santos sold 25% economic rights of numbers of footballer to DIS Esporte, including Wesley. Also in 2008, he started to get more playing time making 20 league appearances and nine Copa Libertadores appearances.

On 26 March 2009, Wesley joined Atlético Paranaense on loan until the end of the 2009 season. In total, he played 33 matches, scoring two goals.

In 2010, Wesley returned to Santos where he became a key player in the 2010 Campeonato Paulista and 2010 Copa do Brasil championship which team won, mostly in the right back position. On 22 May 2010, Wesley scored his first goal for Santos in a 2–1 win over Goianiense. His performances at Santos attracted interest from European clubs such as Portuguese side Benfica and German side Werder Bremen

=== Werder Bremen ===
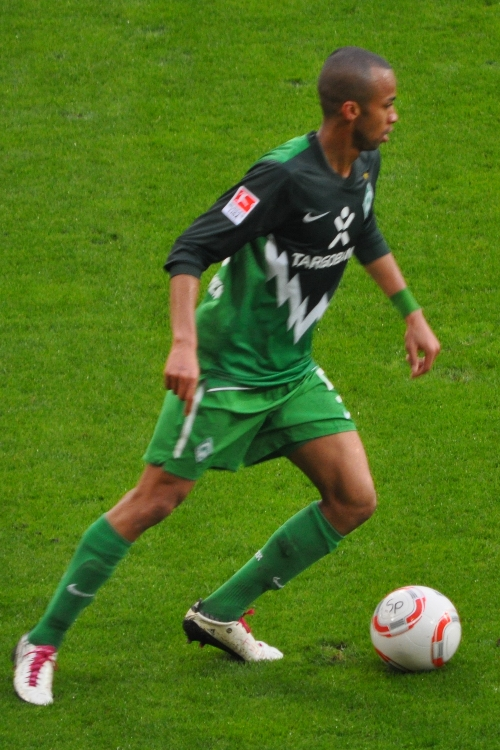
Wesley with Werder Bremen in 2010

In summer 2010, Wesley signed a four-year contract with Werder Bremen for a reported transfer fee of €7.5 million. Santos received R$ 7.735 million for its 35% economic rights with a remaining 40% of economic rights being held by unknown parties. On 11 September 2010, he made his debut in a Werder Bremen shirt in a 0–0 draw against Bayern Munich. On 23 October 2010, he scored his first goal for the club in a 4–1 win over Borussia Mönchengladbach. Wesley was kept out of action by an injury sustained in a match against Schalke 04 on 20 November 2010 before making his return on 7 March 2011 in a match against Borussia Mönchengladbach. On 20 August 2011, he scored his second goal for the club in a 5–3 win over SC Freiburg. He made a total of 26 league matches scoring two goals at Werder Bremen.

=== Palmeiras ===
On 8 March 2012, Wesley returned to Brazil for Palmeiras on a three-year contract for an estimated €6 million (£5 million) transfer fee. During the negotiations, the Brazilian club came to make a campaign to collect money through the crowd to hire the player, since it lacked the 2 million to pay the first installment of the player to the Germans. An investor willing to pay the first installment, however, allowed for the completion of the negotiations. Wesley made his debut for the club in a 1–0 loss against Paulista on 29 March 2012. On 8 April 2012, he suffered a knee ligament injury in a 3–1 loss against Guarani which kept him out of action for the rest of the season with an expected return in 2013.

=== São Paulo ===
On 1 March 2015, Wesley joined São Paulo signing a contract running until 2018.

== International career ==
Wesley made his début for the Brazil national team on 7 October 2010, as a substitute in a 3–0 friendly win over Iran played at the Zayed Sports City Stadium in Abu Dhabi.

== Honours ==
Santos

- Campeonato Paulista: 2010
- Copa do Brasil: 2010

Palmeiras

- Copa do Brasil: 2012
- Campeonato Brasileiro Série B: 2013
