= Breitner (footballer, born 1989) =

Venezuelan footballer

Personal information
- Full name: Overath Breitner da Silva Medina
- Date of birth: September 9, 1989 (age 37)
- Place of birth: Barcelona, Venezuela
- Height: 1.70 m (5 ft 7 in)
- Position: Attacking midfielder

Youth career
- 2002–2009: Santos

Senior career*
Years	Team	Apps	(Gls)
2009–2014	Santos	22	(0)
2011	→ Figueirense (loan)	19	(5)
2011	→ Criciúma (loan)	11	(0)
2012	→ Náutico (loan)	5	(0)
2013	→ Araxá (loan)	9	(1)
2014	→ XV de Piracicaba (loan)	6	(2)
2014	→ Boa Esporte (loan)	0	(0)
2014	Mineros de Guayana	16	(1)
2015–2017	União Madeira	52	(6)
2017–2019	Leixões	39	(7)
2019	Arouca	13	(0)
Total		192	(25)

International career
- Venezuela U-20
- * Club domestic league appearances and goals

Overath Breitner da Silva Medina, known simply as Breitner (born September 9, 1989, in Barcelona), is a Venezuelan retired footballer who played as an attacking midfielder.

== Career ==
Breitner signed for União da Madeira, on 29 May 2015, on a two-year contract.

== Career statistics ==
(Correct as of November 8, 2023)

Club	Season	Domestic League		Domestic Cup		Continental Competitions		Other Tournaments		Total	
Club	Season	Apps	Goals	Apps	Goals	Apps	Goals	Apps	Goals	Apps	Goals
Santos	2010	11	0	1	1	0	0	3	0	15	1
Santos	2011	3	0	–		–		–		3	0
Santos	2012	–		–		–		5	0	5	0
Santos	Subtotal	14	0	1	1	0	0	8	0	23	1
Figueirense (loan)	2011	0	0	0	0	0	0	19	5	19	5
Criciúma (loan)	2011	11	0	–		–		–		11	0
Náutico (loan)	2012	5	0	–		–		–		5	0
Araxá (loan)	2013	0	0	0	0	0	0	9	1	9	1
XV de Piracicaba (loan)	2014	0	0	0	0	0	0	6	2	6	2
Mineros	2014–15	16	1	–		–		–		16	1
União da Madeira	2015–16	27	2	1	0	–		–		28	2
União da Madeira	2016–17	25	4	2	1	–		–		27	5
União da Madeira	Subtotal	52	6	3	1	–		–		55	7
Leixões	2017–18	33	10	4	1	–		–		37	11
Leixões	2018–19	6	0	3	1	–		–		9	1
Leixões	Subtotal	39	10	7	2	–		–		46	12
Arouca	2018–19	13	0	–		–		–		13	0
Total		150	17	11	4	0	0	42	8	203	29

according to combined sources on the soccerway.com

== Personal life ==
He is the son of former Venezuelan footballer Joaquín da Silva, who played during his career under his alias Fariñas. He was namesaked after the German footballers Wolfgang Overath and Paul Breitner.
