= Mogi Mirim Esporte Clube =

Mogi Mirim
- Full name: Mogi Mirim Esport Clube
- Nickname: Sapão (Big Toad)
- Founded: February 1, 1932; 94 years ago
- Ground: Estádio Vail Chaves
- Capacity: 19,900
- 2023: Paulista Segunda Divisão, 33rd of 36
- Website: www.mogimirim.com.br
Home colours	Away colours	Third colours

Mogi Mirim Esporte Clube, more commonly referred to as Mogi Mirim, is a Brazilian football club based in Mogi Mirim, São Paulo. It competes in the Campeonato Paulista Segunda Divisão, the fifth tier of the São Paulo state football league.

Founded on 1 February 1932, the team's home ground is the Estádio Vail Chaves, which has a capacity of 19,900.

The club's home colours are red and white and the team mascot is a toad.

== History ==
The club was founded on February 1, 1932, and since its first year the club has been competing in tournaments organized by the Federação Paulista de Futebol (Paulista Football Federation). The club became a professional team in the 1950s, but its results were poor at the beginning. In the 1980s, after the arrival of Wilson de Barros as club president, Mogi Mirim began to see results and eventually was promoted to the Campeonato Paulista first division. The club was relegated to the second division in 1994, but was promoted again to the first division the following year.

In 2008, Rivaldo, who is one of the most famous Brazilian footballers, became the chairman of the club.

In December 2014, shortly after the club's promotion to the Série B, Rivaldo put the club up for sale on Instagram. In the following year, the club returned to the Série C, and after that, the team suffered a string of consecutive relegations in both national and state levels, ending with a relegation to the state fourth level in 2018. After playing the Campeonato Paulista Segunda Divisão editions in 2021 and 2023, Mogi Mirim has been licensed from professional football.

== Stadium ==
The club plays at Estádio Vail Chaves. The stadium was formerly known as Estádio Papa João Paulo II, named after Pope John Paul II, and later Estádio Romildo Vitor Gomes Ferreira, after the father of ex-player and club president Rivaldo. After Rivaldo sold his stake in the club, it returned to its original name, Estádio Vail Chaves, after the businessman who donated land for its construction.

== Honours ==
=== Official tournaments ===
Inter-state
Competitions	Titles	Seasons
Torneio Ricardo Teixeira	1	1993
State
Competitions	Titles	Seasons
Campeonato Paulista Série A2	2	1985, 1995

- record

=== Others tournaments ===
==== State ====
- Campeonato Paulista do Interior (1): 2012
- Copa 90 Anos de Futebol (1): 1992

==== City ====
- Torneio Mogi Mirim (1): 1993

=== Runners-up ===
- Campeonato Brasileiro Série C (1): 2001
- Torneio João Havelange (1): 1993
