= 2012 Santos FC season =

Santos
2012 season
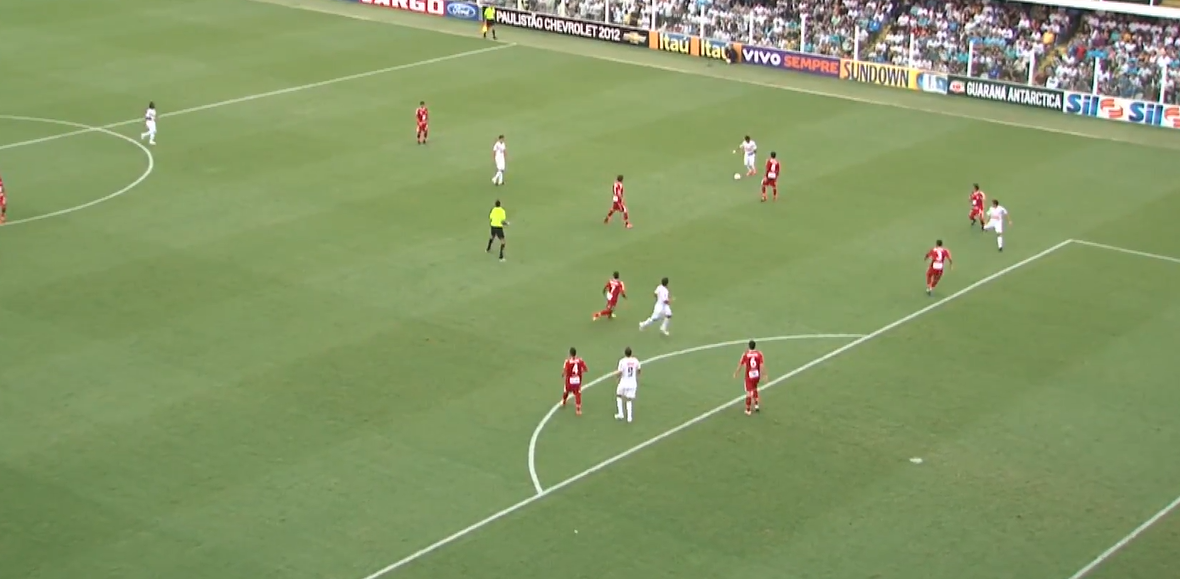
- Santos vs Mogi Mirim at the Vila Belmiro on 22 April
- President: Luis Álvaro de Oliveira Ribeiro
- Coach: Muricy Ramalho
- Stadium: Vila Belmiro
- Campeonato Brasileiro: 8th
- Campeonato Paulista: Winners
- Copa Libertadores: Semi-finals
- Recopa Sudamericana: Winners
- Top goalscorer: League: Neymar (14); All: Neymar (43)
- Highest home attendance: 53,749 vs Guarani (13 May)
- Lowest home attendance: 2,203 vs Ituano (26 January)
- Average home league attendance: 10,013
Home colours	Away colours	Third colours

The 2012 season was Santos Futebol Clube's 100th season in existence and the club's fifty-third consecutive season in the top flight of Brazilian football.

Santos won the Campeonato Paulista title for the third consecutive time and became the first team in 43 years to win three straight São Paulo state championships. Neymar was the top scorer and the best player.

They also competed in the Libertadores as the defending champions, exiting in the semi-finals after a 1–2 aggregate loss against eventual winners Corinthians.

On 26 September, Santos beat Universidad de Chile with an aggregate of 2–0 to win the Recopa Sudamericana for the first time.

Santos' youth team won the U20 Campeonato Paulista by beating São Paulo 2–0 on aggregate score.

Santos finished the Campeonato Brasileiro in eighth place after winning their last match 3–1 against Palmeiras on 1 December.

== Key events ==
- 5 January: Santos announce that Nike Inc. will become club's official kit supplier.
- 9 January: Neymar wins 2011 FIFA Puskás Goal of the Year Award.
- 19 January: Neymar named best footballer in South America in 2011.
- 28 January: Highest scorer in NBA history, Kareem Abdul-Jabbar visits Santos' training ground and plays football with Neymar.
- 2 February: Léo reaches 400 matches as Santos' player.
- 3 February: Santos release new kit produced by Nike Inc.
- 5 February: Neymar scores his 100th goal as professional footballer.
- 10 February: Uruguayan right back Fucile joins the club from Porto on a one-year loan deal.
- 24 February: Santos launch centenary' clock at Santos beach.
- 12 March: Neymar participates a charity dinner with Prince Harry.
- 27 March: The movie "Santos, 100 years of football art" is released in Brazilians theaters
- 4 April: Editora Magma Cultural release the book "Santos, 100 years of football art".
- 14 April: Santos centenary birthday.
- 14 April: Santos release new third kit.
- 29 April: Neymar scores his 100th goal as Santos' player
- 10 May: Neymar scores his 105th and 106th career goals with Santos, becoming the team's top scorer in the post-Pele era.
- 5 July: Rafael, Neymar and Ganso are included in the Brazil squad for the 2012 Summer Olympics.
- 16 July: Santos' coach, Muricy Ramalho renew his contract until December 2013.
- 24 July: Konami announces Vila Belmiro as the first Brazilian stadium in Pro Evolution Soccer's history.
- 19 August: Muricy Ramalho completes 100 matches as Santos' coach.
- 14 September: Santos release new away kit.
- 29 October: Neymar shortlisted for FIFA Ballon d’Or 2012.
- 3 November: Cruzeiro's fans applaud and chant Neymar's name after a hat-trick and an assist at the Estádio Independência.
- 14 November: Neymar nominated for FIFA Puskás Award 2012.

== Players ==
=== Squad information ===
N	Pos.	Nat.	Name	Age	Since	App	Goals	Ends	Transfer fee	Notes
	GK	(Brazil)	Aranha	45	2011	29	0	2012	Undisclosed	
	GK	(Brazil)	Gabriel Gasparotto	33	2012	0	0	2015	Youth system	
	GK	(Brazil)	Rafael	36	2009	161	0	2014	Youth system	
	GK	(Brazil)	Vladimir	37	2009	5	0	2014	Youth system	
	DF	(Brazil)	Bruno Peres	36	2012	24	2	2013	Free	On loan from Audax
	DF	(Brazil)	Crystian	34	2011	16	0	2015	Youth system	
	DF	(Brazil)	Douglas	33	2012	3	0	2013	Youth system	
	DF	(Uruguay)	Fucile	41	2012	14	1	2012	Free	on loan from Porto
	DF	(Brazil)	Juan	44	2012	42	2	2012	Free	on loan from São Paulo
	DF	(Brazil)	Léo (vice-captain)	51	2009	423	23	2013	Free	
	DF	(Brazil)	Paulo Henrique Soares	33	2012	5	0	2013	Youth system	
	DF	(Brazil)	Rafael Galhardo	35	2012	4	0	2016	Free	
	DF	(Brazil)	Bruno Rodrigo	41	2010	79	5	2012	Undisclosed	
	DF	(Brazil)	David Braz	39	2012	7	0	2015	Free	
	DF	(Brazil)	Durval	46	2010	197	5	2013	Undisclosed	
	DF	(Brazil)	Edu Dracena (captain)	45	2009	151	14	2015	Free	
	DF	(Brazil)	Gustavo Henrique	33	2012	1	0	2014	Youth system	
	MF	(Brazil)	Adriano	39	2006	184	0	2013	Youth system	
	MF	(Brazil)	Alan Santos	35	2009	6	0	2013	Youth system	
	MF	(Brazil)	Alison	33	2011	1	0	2013	Youth system	
	MF	(Brazil)	Arouca	40	2010	161	2	2014	€3,5M	
	MF	(Brazil)	Ewerton Páscoa	37	2012	12	0	2012	Free	On loan from Audax
	MF	(Brazil)	Henrique	41	2011	71	2	2015	€3M	
	MF	(Brazil)	Bernardo	36	2012	14	1	2012	Free	On loan from Vasco
	MF	(Brazil)	Felipe Anderson	33	2010	89	9	2016	Youth system	
	DF	(Brazil)	Gérson Magrão	41	2012	25	0	2013	Free	On loan from Primavera
	MF	(Brazil)	Leandrinho	33	2012	3	0	2014	Youth system	
	MF	(Argentina)	Patricio Rodriguez	36	2012	22	2	2016	€1,6M	
	MF	(Brazil)	Pedro Castro	33	2012	1	0	2015	Youth system	
	FW	(Brazil)	André	36	2012	75	35	2013	€2M	On loan from Atlético Mineiro
	FW	(Brazil)	Bill	42	2012	16	1	2014	Free	
	FW	(Brazil)	Geuvânio	34	2012	4	0	2015	Youth system	
	FW	(Brazil)	João Pedro	34	2012	10	0	2014	€500K	
	FW	(Argentina)	Miralles	43	2012	18	6	2014	Free	
	FW	(Brazil)	Neymar (2nd VC)	34	2009	206	124	2014	Youth system	
	FW	(Brazil)	Victor Andrade	31	2012	19	3	2014	Youth system	

- Last updated: 1 December 2012
- Source: Santos FC (for appearances and goals), CBF (for contracts)
- Ordered by Positions and Alphabetical order.

=== Appearances and goals ===
Pos.	Name	Campeonato Brasileiro		Campeonato Paulista		Copa Libertadores		Recopa Sudamericana		Total	
Pos.	Name	Apps	Goals	Apps	Goals	Apps	Goals	Apps	Goals	Apps	Goals
MF	(Brazil) Adriano	27(1)	0	8(1)	0	7(1)	0	2	0	47	0
MF	(Brazil) Alan Santos	1(3)	0	0(1)	0	0	0	0	0	5	0
FW	(Brazil) André	18(1)	7	0	0	0	0	2	0	21	7
GK	(Brazil) Aranha	13	0	9(1)	0	0	0	0	0	23	0
MF	(Brazil) Arouca	31	0	17	1	12	0	2	0	62	1
MF	(Brazil) Bernardo	5(9)	1	0	0	0	0	0	0	14	1
FW	(Brazil) Bill	7(9)	1	0	0	0	0	0	0	16	1
DF	(Brazil) Bruno Peres	24(1)	2	0	0	0	0	2	0	27	2
DF	(Brazil) Bruno Rodrigo	31(2)	3	10	1	0(1)	0	2	1	46	5
DF	(Brazil) Crystian	1	0	2(4)	0	0	0	0	0	7	0
DF	(Brazil) David Braz	5(2)	0	0	0	0	0	0	0	7	0
DF	(Brazil) Douglas	2(1)	0	0	0	0	0	0	0	3	0
DF	(Brazil) Durval	33	1	16	1	12	0	2	0	63	2
DF	(Brazil) Edu Dracena (c)	6	2	13	4	12	1	0	0	31	7
DF	(Brazil) Emerson Palmieri	1	0	3	0	0	0	0	0	4	0
MF	(Brazil) Ewerton Páscoa	9(2)	0	0	0	0	0	0(1)	0	12	0
MF	(Brazil) Felipe Anderson	30(5)	6	7(6)	1	1(3)	0	1(1)	0	54	7
DF	(Uruguay) Fucile	0	0	8(1)	0	5	1	0	0	14	1
DF	(Brazil) Gérson Magrão	15(8)	0	0	0	0	0	0(1)	0	24	0
FW	(Brazil) Geuvânio	0(4)	0	0	0	0	0	0	0	4	0
DF	(Brazil) Gustavo Henrique	1	0	0	0	0	0	0	0	1	0
MF	(Brazil) Henrique	19(3)	0	13	0	11	1	0	0	46	1
MF	(Brazil) João Pedro	1(9)	0	0	0	0	0	0	0	10	0
DF	(Brazil) Juan	15(3)	0	12	2	11	0	1	0	42	2
MF	(Brazil) Leandrinho	3	0	0	0	0	0	0	0	3	0
DF	(Brazil) Léo	17	0	2(2)	0	0(2)	0	1	0	24	0
FW	(Argentina) Miralles	8(8)	6	0	0	0	0	0(2)	0	18	6
FW	(Brazil) Neymar	17	14	16	20	12	8	2	1	47	43
FW	(Argentina) Patricio Rodriguez	14(6)	2	0	0	0	0	2	0	22	2
MF	(Brazil) Pedro Castro	1	0	0	0	0	0	0	0	1	0
DF	(Brazil) Paulo Henrique Soares	0	0	5	0	0	0	0	0	5	0
GK	(Brazil) Rafael	25	0	14	0	12	0	2	0	53	0
DF	(Brazil) Rafael Galhardo	5	0	0	0	0	0	0	0	5	0
FW	(Brazil) Victor Andrade	10(9)	3	0	0	0	0	0	0	19	3
Players who left the club during the season
MF	(Brazil) Ganso	5	1	16	4	12	3	1	0	34	8
FW	(Brazil) Dimba^{1}	3(3)	0	3(5)	3	0(2)	0	0	0	16	3
MF	(Brazil) Anderson Carvalho^{1}	1	0	6(1)	1	0	0	0	0	8	1
MF	(Brazil) Elano	2(1)	0	10(8)	0	6(4)	2	0	0	31	2
DF	(Brazil) Maranhão^{1}	3(3)	0	9(2)	1	1(1)	1	0	0	19	2
FW	(Brazil) Alan Kardec	4	0	13(7)	7	5(6)	4	0	0	35	11
MF	(Venezuela) Breitner^{1}	0	0	0(5)	0	0	0	0	0	5	0
FW	(Brazil) Borges	3	0	10(1)	5	8(3)	2	0	0	25	7
MF	(Brazil) Ibson	0	0	14(5)	4	5(3)	0	0	0	27	4
DF	(Brazil) Vinicius Simon^{1}	0(1)	0	7	1	0	0	0	0	8	1
DF	(Brazil) Pará^{1}	0	0	3(1)	0	1	0	0	0	5	0
DF	(Brazil) Rafael Caldeira^{1}	0	0	2	1	0	0	0	0	2	1
FW	(Colombia) Rentería	4(1)	1	4(4)	0	0(1)	0	0	0	14	1
FW	(Brazil) Tiago Alves^{1}	0	0	2(3)	0	0	0	0	0	5	0
FW	(Brazil) Tiago Luís^{1}	0	0	1(1)	0	0	0	0	0	2	0

^{1}Player was loaned

Last updated: 1 December 2012
Source: Match reports in competitive matches, Santos FC, ESPN Soccernet, Soccerway

=== Goalscorers ===
R	Name	Paulistão	Libertadores	Brasileirão	Sudamericana	Total
1	(Brazil) Neymar	20	8	14	1	43
2	(Brazil) Alan Kardec	7	4	0	0	11
3	(Brazil) Ganso	4	3	1	0	8
4	(Brazil) Borges	5	2	0	0	7
4	(Brazil) Edu Dracena	4	1	2	0	7
4	(Brazil) André	0	0	7	0	7
4	(Brazil) Felipe Anderson	1	0	6	0	7
5	(Argentina) Miralles	0	0	6	0	6
6	(Brazil) Bruno Rodrigo	1	0	3	1	5
7	(Brazil) Ibson	4	0	0	0	4
8	(Brazil) Dimba	3	0	0	0	3
8	(Brazil) Victor Andrade	0	0	3	0	3
9	(Brazil) Juan	2	0	0	0	2
9	(Brazil) Maranhão	1	1	0	0	2
9	(Brazil) Elano	0	2	0	0	2
9	(Brazil) Durval	1	0	1	0	2
9	(Brazil) Bruno Peres	0	0	2	0	2
9	(Argentina) Patricio Rodriguez	0	0	2	0	2
10	(Brazil) Vinicius Simon	1	0	0	0	1
10	(Brazil) Anderson Carvalho	1	0	0	0	1
10	(Brazil) Arouca	1	0	0	0	1
10	(Brazil) Rafael Caldeira	1	0	0	0	1
10	(Brazil) Henrique	0	1	0	0	1
10	(Uruguay) Fucile	0	1	0	0	1
10	(Colombia) Rentería	0	0	1	0	1
10	(Brazil) Bill	0	0	1	0	1
10	(Brazil) Bernardo	0	0	1	0	1
	Own goal	1	0	0	0	1
Total	–	58	23	50	2	133

Last updated: 1 December 2012
Source: Match reports in Competitive matches

=== Disciplinary record ===
N	P	Nat.	Name	Campeonato Paulista			Copa Libertadores			Campeonato Brasileiro			Recopa Sudamericana			Total			Notes
N	P	Nat.	Name	Yellow card	Second yellow card	Red card	Yellow card	Second yellow card	Red card	Yellow card	Second yellow card	Red card	Yellow card	Second yellow card	Red card	Yellow card	Second yellow card	Red card	Notes
	MF	(Brazil)	Adriano	3			3			8			1			15			
	MF	(Brazil)	Alan Santos							2	1					2	1		
	FW	(Brazil)	Alan Kardec	5			1			1						7			
	MF	(Brazil)	Anderson Carvalho	3						1						4			
	FW	(Brazil)	André							6						6			
	GK	(Brazil)	Aranha	2						1						3			
	MF	(Brazil)	Arouca	2			3			3			1			9			
	FW	(Brazil)	Bill							1						1			
	FW	(Brazil)	Borges	1												1			
	DF	(Brazil)	Bruno Peres							4						4			
	DF	(Brazil)	Bruno Rodrigo	3						3						6			
	DF	(Brazil)	Crystian	1												1			
	DF	(Brazil)	David Braz							1						1			
	DF	(Brazil)	Douglas							1						1			
	DF	(Brazil)	Durval	3			1			6			1			11			
	DF	(Brazil)	Edu Dracena				3			2						5			
	MF	(Brazil)	Elano	2			1									3			
	DF	(Brazil)	Emerson Palmieri	1												1			
	MF	(Brazil)	Ewerton Páscoa							1						1			
	MF	(Brazil)	Felipe Anderson	1						8						9			
	DF	(Uruguay)	Fucile	3			2									5			
	MF	(Brazil)	Ganso	1						2			1			4			
	DF	(Brazil)	Gérson Magrão							6						6			
	MF	(Brazil)	Geuvânio							1						1			
	MF	(Brazil)	Henrique	2			2			2						6			
	MF	(Brazil)	Ibson	5	1											5	1		
	FW	(Brazil)	João Pedro							1						1			
	DF	(Brazil)	Juan	4			3			5	1	1				12	1	1	
	DF	(Brazil)	Léo							2						2			
	DF	(Brazil)	Maranhão	3												3			
	FW	(Argentina)	Miralles							3						3			
	FW	(Brazil)	Neymar	4			6			6		1				16		1	
	DF	(Brazil)	Pará	1												1			
	DF	(Brazil)	Patricio Rodriguez							1						1			
	DF	(Brazil)	Paulo Henrique Soares	1												1			
	GK	(Brazil)	Rafael	1			2			1						4			
	DF	(Brazil)	Rafael Galhardo							1						1			
	FW	(Colombia)	Rentería	1												1			
	FW	(Brazil)	Victor Andrade							4						4			
	DF	(Brazil)	Vinicius Simon	1												1			

Last updated: 1 December 2012
Source: Campeonato Paulista, Copa Libertadores, Campeonato Brasileiro
Ordered by (red card) , (second yellow card) and (yellow card)
(yellow card) = Number of bookings; (second yellow card) = Number of sending offs after a second yellow card; (red card) = Number of sending offs by a direct red card.

=== Copa Libertadores squad ===
As of 14 February 2012, according to combined sources on the official website.
In Conmebol competitions players must be assigned numbers between 1 and 25.

Note: Flags indicate national team as defined under FIFA eligibility rules; some limited exceptions apply. Players may hold more than one non-FIFA nationality.

No.	Pos.	Nation	Player
1	GK	BRA	Rafael
2	DF	BRA	Edu Dracena
3	DF	BRA	Léo
4	DF	URU	Jorge Fucile
5	MF	BRA	Arouca
6	DF	BRA	Durval
7	MF	BRA	Henrique
8	MF	BRA	Elano
9	FW	BRA	Borges
10	MF	BRA	Ganso
11	FW	BRA	Neymar
12	GK	BRA	Aranha
13	DF	BRA	Crystian

No.	Pos.	Nation	Player
14	DF	BRA	Bruno Rodrigo
15	MF	BRA	Adriano
16	DF	BRA	Juan
17	MF	BRA	Felipe Anderson
18	MF	BRA	Gérson Magrão^{1}
19	FW	BRA	Alan Kardec
20	FW	COL	Wason Rentería
21	DF	BRA	Maranhão^{1}
22	MF	BRA	Anderson Carvalho
23	MF	BRA	Ewerton Páscoa^{1}
24	GK	BRA	Vladimir
25	FW	BRA	Dimba

^{1}Pará, Ibson and Vinicius Simon left the club during the competition, and for their places, Maranhão, Gérson Magrão and Ewerton Páscoa were entered.

=== Recopa Sudamericana squad ===
As of 20 August 2012, according to combined sources on the official website.
In Conmebol competitions players must be assigned numbers between 1 and 25.

Note: Flags indicate national team as defined under FIFA eligibility rules; some limited exceptions apply. Players may hold more than one non-FIFA nationality.

No.	Pos.	Nation	Player
1	GK	BRA	Rafael
2	DF	BRA	Bruno Rodrigo
3	DF	BRA	Léo
4	DF	BRA	Bruno Peres
5	MF	BRA	Arouca
6	DF	BRA	Durval
7	MF	BRA	Henrique
8	MF	BRA	Felipe Anderson
9	FW	BRA	André
10	MF	BRA	Ganso
11	FW	BRA	Neymar
12	GK	BRA	Aranha
13	DF	BRA	David Braz

No.	Pos.	Nation	Player
14	MF	BRA	Ewerton Páscoa
15	MF	BRA	Adriano
16	DF	BRA	Juan
17	FW	ARG	Pato Rodriguez
18	MF	BRA	Leandrinho
19	FW	BRA	Bill
20	FW	ARG	Miralles
21	DF	BRA	Douglas
22	MF	BRA	Gérson Magrão
23	FW	BRA	João Pedro
24	GK	BRA	Vladimir
25	FW	BRA	Victor Andrade

== Club ==
=== Coaching staff ===
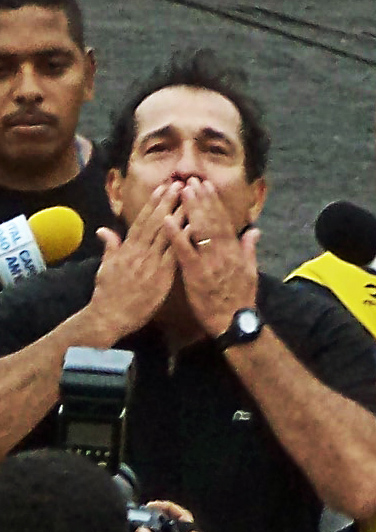
2012 was Muricy Ramalho's second season with Santos.

Position	Staff
Coach	Muricy Ramalho
Assistant coach	Cláudio Grillo; Edinho; Marcelo Fernandes; Tata
Fitness trainer	Ricardo Rosa; Fernando Fernandez; Marco Alejandro
Goalkeeping coach	Oscar Rodriguez; Arzul

Source: Santos FC

=== Other staff ===
Position	Staff
Coordinator	Carlos Eiki Baptista
Press Officer	Fábio Maradei
Doctors	Dr. Maurício Zenaide; Dr. Ricardo Nobre; Dr. Rodrigo Zogaib
Physiotherapists	Avelino Buongermino; Rafael Martini; Thiago Lobo
Physiologist	Dr. Luís Fernando de Barros
Massagist	Clóvis Vesco; Jorginho; Valder Bernardo
Nurse	Sylvio Cruz
Nutritionist	Sandra Merouço
Psychologist	Juliane Fechio
Equipment managers	França; Vagner Santos; Zuca
Lawyer	João Vicente Gazolla
Driver	Arnaldo

Source: Santos FC

=== Club officials ===
Position	Staff
President	Luis Álvaro de Oliveira Ribeiro
Vice-President	Odílio Rodrigues
Management Committee	Alvaro de Souza; Augusto Videira; Caio de Stefano; Eduardo Vassimon; José Berenguer; Luciano Moita; Pedro Luiz Nunes
Football manager	Nei Pandolfo

Source: Santos FC

=== Kit ===
The previous season kit was used until April due an agreement that Santos had with Umbro.

The home kit was released on 3 February 2012. Later, on 14 April 2012, Santos' centenary birthday, the third kit was released with the "sea color". The third kit was used as away kit until 14 October 2012, when the traditional away kit with black and white stripes was released in the match against Vasco valid for the 2013 Campeonato Brasileiro.

Home	Away	Third	Goalkeeper 1	Goalkeeper 2	Goalkeeper 3

==== Official sponsorship ====
- Banco BMG
- Seara
- Netshoes
- CSU CardSystem
- Marabraz.

== Transfers ==
=== In ===
P	Nat.	Name	Age	Moving from	Type	Ends	Source
GK	(Brazil)	Felipe	24	Avaí	Loan Return	2013	Terra Esporte
GK	(Brazil)	Fábio Costa	34	Atlético Mineiro	Loan Return	2013	Terra Esporte
DF	(Brazil)	Rafael Caldeira	20	ABC	Loan Return	2014	Ademir Quintino
DF	(Brazil)	Maranhão	26	Coritiba	Loan Return	2013	Santos FC
MF	(Brazil)	Madson	26	Atlético Paranaense	Loan Return	2012	UOL Esporte
FW	(Brazil)	Tiago Luís	22	Ponte Preta	Loan Return	2013	Santos FC
DF	(Brazil)	Juan	30	São Paulo	Loaned	2012	Globo Esporte
DF	(Uruguay)	Fucile	27	Porto (Portugal)	Loaned	2012	R7 Esportes
MF	(Brazil)	Bernardo	22	Vasco	Loaned	2012	Terra Esportes
DF	(Brazil)	Gérson Magrão	27	Primavera	Loaned	2013	UOL Esporte
FW	(Brazil)	Tiago Luís	23	XV de Piracicaba	Loan Return	2013	Globo Esporte
DF	(Brazil)	David Braz	25	Flamengo	Signed	2014	Santos FC
DF	(Brazil)	Rafael Galhardo	20	Flamengo	Signed	2015	Santos FC
DF	(Brazil)	Ewerton Páscoa	23	Audax	Loaned	2012	Santos FC
DF	(Brazil)	Bruno Peres	22	Audax	Loaned	2013	Santos FC
MF	(Brazil)	João Pedro	20	Palermo (Italy)	Signed	2014	Santos FC
FW	(Argentina)	Miralles	28	Grêmio	Signed	2014	Globo Esporte
MF	(Argentina)	Patricio Rodríguez	22	Independiente (Argentina)	Signed	2016	Santos FC
FW	(Brazil)	Bill	28	Corinthians	Signed	2014	Placar
FW	(Brazil)	André	21	Atlético Mineiro	Loaned	2013	Globo Esporte
FW	(Brazil)	Tiago Alves	19	Boa Esporte	Loan Return	2014	Globo Esporte

=== Out ===
P	Nat.	Name	Age	Moving to	Type	Source
DF	(Brazil)	Danilo	20	Porto (Portugal)	Transferred	Globo Esporte
FW	(Brazil)	Diogo	24	Olympiacos (Greece)	Loan expiration	
DF	(Brazil)	Leandro Silva	22	Atlético Sorocaba	Loan expiration	Futebol Interior
MF	(Brazil)	Rodrigo Possebon	23	Unattached	Contract terminated	Santos FC
MF	(Brazil)	Rodrigo Mancha	25	Vitória	Contract terminated	Santos FC
DF	(Brazil)	Domingos	26	Guarani	End of contract	Terra Esportes
DF	(Brazil)	Bruno Aguiar	26	Sport	Transferred	Lancenet
MF	(Brazil)	Ibson	28	Flamengo	Swapped^{1}	Estadão
FW	(Brazil)	Wason Rentería	26	Caxias	Loan Expiration	Globo Esporte
FW	(Brazil)	Alan Kardec	23	Benfica (Portugal)	Loan Expiration	Globo Esporte
FW	(Brazil)	Borges	31	Cruzeiro	Contract terminated	Globo Esporte
MF	(Brazil)	Elano	31	Grêmio	Swapped^{2}	Globo Esporte
MF	(Brazil)	Ganso	22	São Paulo	Transferred	Globo Esporte

- 1: Included in David Braz and Rafael Galhardo transfers.
- 2: Included in Ezequiel Miralles transfer.

=== Out on loan ===
P	Nat.	Name	Age	Loaned to	Until	Source
MF	(Brazil)	Madson	25	Al-Khor (Qatar)	15 May 2012	Globo Esporte
FW	(Brazil)	Tiago Luís	22	XV de Piracicaba	13 May 2012	Santos FC
GK	(Brazil)	Felipe	24	Náutico	End of the season	Santos FC
DF	(Brazil)	Pará	25	Grêmio	End of the season	Santos FC
DF	(Brazil)	Rafael Caldeira	25	Bragantino	30 November 2012	Santos FC
FW	(Brazil)	Tiago Alves	19	Boa Esporte	30 November 2012	Santos FC
MF	(Venezuela)	Breitner	22	Náutico	End of the season	Globo Esporte
DF	(Brazil)	Vinicius Simon	25	América Mineiro	15 May 2013	Lancenet
DF	(Brazil)	Maranhão	26	Atlético Paranaense	End of the season	Futebol Interior
MF	(Brazil)	Anderson Carvalho	20	Vissel Kobe (Japan)	End of the season	Globo Esporte
FW	(Brazil)	Tiago Luís	23	Bragantino	1 December 2012	Extra
FW	(Brazil)	Dimba	19	Naútico	End of the season	Globo Esporte

== Competitions ==
=== Overall summary ===
Competition	Started round	Final position / round	First match	Last match
Campeonato Brasileiro	–	8th	20 May 2012	2 December 2012
Campeonato Paulista	First stage	Winners	21 January 2012	13 May 2012
Copa Libertadores	Group stage	Semi-finals	15 February 2012	20 June 2012
Recopa Sudamericana	Finals	Winners	22 August 2012	26 September 2012

Updated to match played 2 December 2012
Source: Competitions

=== Detailed overall summary ===
	Total	Home	Away
Games played	75	38	37
Games won	36	24	12
Games drawn	20	10	10
Games lost	19	4	15
Biggest win	8–0 v Bolívar	8–0 v Bolívar	4–0 v Cruzeiro
Biggest loss	0–3 v Náutico	1–3 v Bahia; 1–3 v Portuguesa	0–3 Náutico
Clean sheets	27	18	9
Goals scored	133	84	49
Goals conceded	75	32	43
Goal difference	+58	+52	+6
Average GF per game	1.77	2.21	1.32
Average GA per game	1	0.84	1.16
Yellow cards (yellow card)	169	78	91
Red cards (red card)	5	2	3
Most appearances	Durval (63)	Durval (37)	Arouca (27)
Top scorer	Neymar (43)	Neymar (24)	Neymar (19)
Worst discipline	Juan (12) (yellow card) (2) (red card)	Adriano (8) (yellow card)	Juan (8) (yellow card) (2) (red card)
Points	128/225 (56.89%)	82/114 (71.93%)	46/111 (41.44%)
Winning rate	(48%)	(63.16%)	(32.43%)

Last updated: 1 December 2012
Source: Competitive matches

|}

=== Recopa Sudamericana ===
22 August 1st Leg	Universidad de Chile	0–0	(Brazil) Santos	Santiago, Chile
22:05 UTC-04:00	Cereceda (yellow card) 1'; Lorenzetti (yellow card) 54'	Report	(yellow card) 10' Arouca; (yellow card) 27' Ganso	Stadium: Estadio Nacional; Referee: (Argentina) Néstor Pitana

26 September 2nd Leg	Santos (Brazil)	2–0 (2–0 agg.)	Universidad de Chile	São Paulo, Brazil
19:00 UTC-03:00	Adriano (yellow card) 18'; Neymar 27'; Bruno Rodrigo 60'; Durval (yellow card) 75'	Report	(yellow card) 32' Rojas; (yellow card) 56' Martínez; (yellow card) 59' González; (yellow card) 88' Lorenzetti	Stadium: Pacaembu; Referee: (Uruguay) Martín Vázquez

=== Campeonato Brasileiro ===
==== League table ====
Pos	Team	Pld	W	D	L	GF	GA	GD	Pts	Qualification or relegation
6	Corinthians	38	15	12	11	51	39	+12	57	2013 Copa Libertadores Second Stage (Note: Corinthians qualified for the second stage of the 2013 Copa Libertadores as the 2012 Copa Libertadores champion.)
7	Botafogo	38	15	10	13	60	50	+10	55	
8	Santos	38	13	14	11	50	44	+6	53	
9	Cruzeiro	38	15	7	16	47	51	−4	52	
10	Internacional	38	13	13	12	44	40	+4	52	

Updated to match(es) played on unknown. Source: UOL.com.br
Rules for classification: 1st points; 2nd wins; 3rd goal difference; 4th goals scored; 5th head-to-head results; 6th least red cards received; 7th least yellow cards received; 8th draw

==== Results summary ====
Overall								Home						Away					
Pld	W	D	L	GF	GA	GD	Pts	W	D	L	GF	GA	GD	W	D	L	GF	GA	GD
38	13	14	11	50	44	+6	53	8	8	2	32	22	+10	5	6	9	18	22	−4

Last updated: 1 December 2012.
Source: Soccerway

==== Results by round ====
Round	1	2	3	4	5	6	7	8	9	10	11	12	13	14	15	16	17	18	19	20	21	22	23	24	25	26	27	28	29	30	31	32	33	34	35	36	37	38
Ground	A	H	H	A	A	H	A	H	A	H	A	A	H	A	H	H	A	H	A	H	A	A	H	H	A	H	A	H	A	H	H	A	H	A	A	H	A	H
Result	D	D	D	L	L	D	D	W	D	D	L	L	W	L	W	D	W	W	W	L	L	L	D	W	W	L	D	D	W	W	D	L	D	W	L	W	D	W
Position	11	12	13	15	17	18	18	14	13	14	15	18	16	16	14	14	14	12	10	11	13	14	15	11	10	11	13	14	10	9	10	11	11	9	12	10	10	8

Updated to match(es) played on 2 December 2012. Source: Futpédia
A = Away; H = Home; W = Win; D = Draw; L = Loss

==== Matches ====
20 May 1	Bahia	0–0	Santos	Salvador
18:30 UTC-03:00	Fabinho (yellow card) 35'	Report	(yellow card) 16' Bruno Rodrigo	Stadium: Pituaçu; Attendance: 8,808; Referee: Evandro Roman

27 May 2	Santos	0–0	Sport	Santos
16:00 UTC-03:00	Rafael Galhardo (yellow card) 18'; Arouca (yellow card) 56'	Report	(yellow card) 12' Edcarlos; (yellow card) 62' Thiaguinho	Stadium: Vila Belmiro; Attendance: 5,294; Referee: Márcio Chagas da Silva

6 June 3	Santos	1–1	Fluminense	Santos
21:50 UTC-03:00	Rentería 4'; Edu Dracena (yellow card) 7'; Adriano (yellow card) 25'; Alan Kardec (yellow card) 87'	Report	25' (pen.) Carlinhos; (yellow card) 76' Edinho	Stadium: Vila Belmiro; Attendance: 4,080; Referee: Jaílson Macedo Freitas (FBF)

10 June 4	São Paulo	1–0	Santos	São Paulo
18:30 UTC-03:00	Paulo Miranda 7'; Denílson (yellow card) 70'	Report	(yellow card) 69' Durval; (yellow card) 72' Felipe Anderson; (yellow card) 80' Bruno Rodrigo	Stadium: Morumbi; Attendance: 6,327; Referee: Flávio Rodrigues Guerra

17 June 5	Flamengo	1–0	Santos	Rio de Janeiro
16:00 UTC-03:00	Bottinelli (yellow card) 57' (goal) 87' (pen.)	Report	(yellow card) 65' Geuvânio; (yellow card) 66' Anderson Carvalho; (yellow card) 84' Gérson Magrão	Stadium: Engenhão; Attendance: 17,373; Referee: Francisco Carlos do Nascimento

24 June 6	Santos	2–2	Coritiba	Santos
18:30 UTC-03:00	Léo (yellow card) 26'; Edu Dracena 31' (yellow card) 64'; Neymar 70'	Report	(yellow card) 16' Sérgio Manoel; (yellow card) 41' Éverton Ribeiro; (yellow card) 46' Émerson; 48' Rafinha; (yellow card) 60' Everton Costa; 74' (pen.) Lincoln; (yellow card) 83' Chico	Stadium: Vila Belmiro; Attendance: 5,120; Referee: Péricles Bassols Pegado Cortez

1 July 7	Portuguesa	0–0	Santos	São Paulo
16:00 UTC-03:00	Rogério (yellow card) 7'; Diego Viana (yellow card) 19'; Gustavo (yellow card) 36'; Léo Silva (yellow card) 43'; Boquita (yellow card) 89'	Report	(yellow card) 8' Adriano; (yellow card) 31' Durval; (yellow card) 34' Neymar	Stadium: Canindé; Attendance: 7,942; Referee: Raphael Claus

8 July 8	Santos	4–2	Grêmio	Santos
16:00 UTC-03:00	Edu Dracena 27'; Felipe Anderson 38', 69'; Neymar 62'	Report	(yellow card) 35' Tony; (yellow card) 57' Souza; (yellow card) 63' Kléber; (yellow card) 68' Werley; 77' Vilson; 90+2' Marquinhos	Stadium: Vila Belmiro; Attendance: 9,402; Referee: Nielson Nogueira Dias

15 July 9	Internacional	0–0	Santos	Porto Alegre
16:00 UTC-03:00	Guiñazú (yellow card) 31'; Dagoberto (yellow card) 42'; Fabrício (yellow card) 46'; Nei (yellow card) 50'; Bolívar (yellow card) 78'	Report	(yellow card) 21' (yellow-red card) 47' Juan; (yellow card) 63' Gérson Magrão; (yellow card) 69' João Pedro; (yellow card) 86' Aranha	Stadium: Beira-Rio; Attendance: 14,044; Referee: Wagner Nascimento Magalhães

18 July 10	Santos	0–0	Botafogo	Santos
19:30 UTC-03:00	Miralles (yellow card) 27'; Felipe Anderson (yellow card) 69'	Report	(yellow card) 83' Antônio Carlos	Stadium: Vila Belmiro; Attendance: 7,069; Referee: Cláudio Francisco Lima e Silva

21 July 11	Vasco	2–0	Santos	Rio de Janeiro
18:30 UTC-03:00	Douglas 11'; Alecsandro 47'	Report	(yellow card) 13' Durval; (yellow card) 90+2' Bruno Peres	Stadium: São Januário; Attendance: 17,222; Referee: Wagner Reway

26 July 12	Atlético Mineiro	2–0	Santos	Belo Horizonte
20:30 UTC-03:00	Danilinho 43' (yellow card) 90+1'; Réver 64'; Serginho (yellow card) 85'	Report	(yellow card) 53' Arouca	Stadium: Independência; Attendance: 20,418; Referee: Antônio Denival de Morais

29 July 13	Santos	2–1	Ponte Preta	Santos
18:30 UTC-03:00	Adriano (yellow card) 30'; Bruno Peres 37'; Henrique (yellow card) 53'; Durval (yellow card) 38'; Arouca (yellow card) 77'; Miralles 85'	Report	(yellow card) 45+1' Cicinho; (yellow card) 64' Tiago Alves; 82' Roger	Stadium: Vila Belmiro; Attendance: 4,261; Referee: Paulo Cesar de Oliveira

5 August 14	Náutico	3–0	Santos	Recife
18:30 UTC-03:00w	Ronaldo Alves (yellow card) 38'; Patric 58'; Kieza (yellow card) 55' (goal) 90+1'; Kim 80'	Report	(yellow card) 64' Léo	Stadium: Aflitos; Attendance: 11,086; Referee: Wilton Pereira Sampaio

8 August 15	Santos	4–2	Cruzeiro	Santos
21:50 UTC-03:00	Felipe Anderson 21'; Victor Andrade 31' (yellow card) 70'; Durval 59'; Bill 77' (yellow card) 7'	Report	28' Borges; 50' Ceará; (yellow card) 58' Charles; (yellow card) 71' (yellow-red card) 90+1' Élber	Stadium: Vila Belmiro; Attendance: 3,215; Referee: Rodrigo Nunes de Sá

11 August 16	Santos	2–2	Atlético Goianiense	São Paulo
18:30 UTC-03:00	Durval (yellow card) 30'; Rodríguez 55'; Felipe Anderson (yellow card) 58'; Miralles 82' (pen.)	Report	3' (yellow card) 49' Patric; (yellow card) 25' Dodó; 36' (yellow card) 82' Wesley; (yellow card) 80' Gustavo	Stadium: Pacaembu; Attendance: 11,210; Referee: Péricles Bassols Pegado Cortez

16 August 17	Figueirense	1–3	Santos	Florianópolis
21:00 UTC-03:00	Aloísio (yellow card) 13'; Túlio (red card) 30'; Fernandes 47'; Jackson (yellow card) 58'	Report	(red card) 9' Juan; (yellow card) 35' Gérson Magrão; (yellow card) 49' (goal) 84' Ganso; 50' Neymar; (yellow card) 54' David Braz; 76' Bruno Peres	Stadium: Orlando Scarpelli; Attendance: 10,993; Referee: Emerson Almeida Ferreira

19 August 18	Santos	3–2	Corinthians	Santos
16:00 UTC-03:00	André 35', 48'; Neymar (yellow card) 47'; Ganso (yellow card) 79'; Bruno Rodrigo 83'; Felipe Anderson (yellow card) 89'	Report	28' Danilo; (yellow card) 67' Paulinho; (yellow card) 67' Douglas; 80' Martínez	Stadium: Vila Belmiro; Attendance: 12,413; Referee: Flávio Rodrigues Guerra

25 August 19	Palmeiras	1–2	Santos	São Paulo
18:30 UTC-03:00	Corrêa 40'; João Vitor (yellow card) 52'; Valdivia (yellow card) 61'; Maurício Ramos (yellow card) 89'	Report	43', 62' Neymar; (yellow card) 53' Adriano	Stadium: Pacaembu; Attendance: 22,022; Referee: Guilherme Ceretta de Lima

29 August 20	Santos	1–3	Bahia	Santos
19:30 UTC-03:00	André 14'; Bruno Peres (yellow card) 89'	Report	(yellow card) 6' Jussandro; 59' Souza; 62' Neto; 72' Gabriel; (yellow card) 75' Danny Morais	Stadium: Vila Belmiro; Attendance: 8,612; Referee: Marcelo de Lima Henrique

2 September 21	Sport	2–1	Santos	Recife
16:00 UTC-03:00	Hugo 3'; Edcarlos (yellow card) 14' (yellow-red card) 59'; Felipe Azevedo 36'; Rithely (yellow card) 53'; Cicinho (yellow card) 75'; Magrão (yellow card) 88'; Naldinho (yellow card) 90+1'	Report	51' (yellow card) 78' André; (yellow card) 17' Juan	Stadium: Ilha do Retiro; Attendance: 22,167; Referee: Francisco Carlos do Nascimento

6 September 22	Fluminense	3–1	Santos	Rio de Janeiro
21:00 UTC-03:00	Wágner (yellow card) 1'; Wellington Nem 20', 43' (yellow card) 61'; Samuel 77'	Report	(yellow card) 23' Juan; 28' André; (yellow card) 59' Bruno Rodrigo	Stadium: Engenhão; Attendance: 15,874; Referee: André Luiz de Freitas Castro

9 September 23	Santos	0–0	São Paulo	Santos
16:00 UTC-03:00	Felipe Anderson (yellow card) 18'	Report	(yellow card) 76' (yellow-red card) 82' Denílson; (yellow card) 90+1' Cícero	Stadium: Vila Belmiro; Attendance: 6,379; Referee: Marcelo Aparecido Ribeiro de Souza

12 September 24	Santos	2–0	Flamengo	Santos
22:00 UTC-03:00	Durval (yellow card) 39'; Adriano (yellow card) 45+1'; Felipe Anderson (yellow card) 68'; Victor Andrade 85' (yellow card) 85'; Neymar 86'	Report	(yellow card) 17' Welinton; (yellow card) 24' Léo Moura; (yellow card) 33' Luiz Antônio; (yellow card) 76' Frauches	Stadium: Vila Belmiro; Attendance: 8,015; Referee: Márcio Chagas da Silva

16 September 25	Coritiba	1–2	Santos	Curitiba
16:00 UTC-03:00	Deivid 9'; Escudero (yellow card) 23'	Report	70', 82' (yellow card) 82' Neymar; (yellow card) 74' Douglas; (yellow card) 84' Gérson Magrão	Stadium: Couto Pereira; Referee: Ronan Marques Rosa

22 September 26	Santos	1–3	Portuguesa	São Paulo
21:00 UTC-03:00	Felipe Anderson (yellow card) 49'; André 74'; Victor Andrade (yellow card) 61'	Report	(yellow card) 10' Valdomiro; (yellow card) 28' Rodriguinho; (yellow card) 31' Gustavo; 37', 62' Bruno Mineiro; 42' Léo Silva; (yellow card) 54' Ferdinando; (yellow card) 55' Boquita	Stadium: Pacaembu; Attendance: 15,774; Referee: Raphael Claus

30 September 27	Grêmio	1–1	Santos	Porto Alegre
18:30 UTC-03:00	Zé Roberto (yellow card) 23'; Vilson (yellow card) 24'; Werley 33'; Pará (yellow card) 75'; Kléber (yellow card) 79'; Elano (yellow card) 86'; Léo Gago (red card) 90+4'	Report	(yellow card) 27' Adriano; (yellow card) 36' Ewerton Páscoa; (yellow card) 50' (red card) 51' Neymar; 57' Bruno Rodrigo; (yellow card) 75' André	Stadium: Olímpico; Attendance: 45,762; Referee: Nielson Nogueira Dias

6 October 28	Santos	1–1	Internacional	Santos
16:00 UTC-03:00	Bernardo 15'	Report	51' Cassiano; (yellow card) 66' Rodrigo Moledo	Stadium: Vila Belmiro; Attendance: 9,965; Referee: Péricles Bassols Pegado Cortez

10 October 29	Botafogo	0–2	Santos	Rio de Janeiro
21:00 UTC-03:00		Report	(yellow card) 45' (goal) 56' Ezequiel Miralles; 53' (yellow card) 54' André; (yellow card) 85' Rodríguez	Stadium: Engenhão; Attendance: 4,634; Referee: Wagner Reway

14 October 30	Santos	2–0	Vasco	Santos
16:00 UTC-03:00	Miralles 8', 46'; Henrique (yellow card) 33'; Rafael (yellow card) 85'	Report	(yellow card) 42' Nílton; (yellow card) 89' Fellipe Bastos	Stadium: Vila Belmiro; Attendance: 6,555; Referee: Wilton Pereira Sampaio

17 October 31	Santos	2–2	Atlético Mineiro	Santos
16:00 UTC-03:00	Miralles 1'; Neymar 11'; Adriano (yellow card) 58'	Report	17' Bernard; (yellow card) 24' Rafael Marques; (yellow card) 51' Júnior César; (yellow card) 59' Pierre; 71' Jô; (yellow card) 90' Carlos César	Stadium: Vila Belmiro; Attendance: 10,553; Referee: Héber Roberto Lopes

21 October 32	Ponte Preta	1–0	Santos	Campinas
18:30 UTC-02:00	Luan 12'; Baraka (yellow card) 62'; Renê Júnior (yellow card) 62'; Uendel (yellow card) 70'	Report	(yellow card) 49' André; (yellow card) 82' Bruno Peres	Stadium: Moisés Lucarelli; Attendance: 13,468; Referee: Guilherme Ceretta de Lima

25 October 33	Santos	0–0	Náutico	Santos
21:00 UTC-02:00	Gérson Magrão (yellow card) 32'; Felipe Anderson (yellow card) 62'	Report	(yellow card) 36' Patric; (yellow card) 51' Alemão; (yellow card) 90+2' Martinez	Stadium: Vila Belmiro; Attendance: 6,256; Referee: Fabrício Neves Corrêa

3 November 34	Cruzeiro	0–4	Santos	Belo Horizonte
19:30 UTC-02:00	Rafael Donato (yellow card) 39'; Ceará (yellow card) 48'; Charles (yellow card) 64'; Willian Magrão (yellow card) 71'; Montillo (yellow card) 86'	Report	11', 35', 81' Neymar; 52' Felipe Anderson; (yellow card) 73' André; (yellow card) 84' Juan; (yellow card) 87' Miralles	Stadium: Independência; Attendance: 16,331; Referee: Grazianni Maciel Rocha

10 November 35	Atlético Goianiense	2–1	Santos	Gama
19:30 UTC-02:00	Gustavo (yellow card) 40'; Diego Giaretta (yellow card) 61'; Ernandes (yellow card) 72'; Diogo Campos 84'; Márcio 88' (pen.)	Report	(yellow card) 40' Adriano; 45' Bruno Rodrigo; (yellow card) 67' Gérson Magrão; (yellow card) 85' Neymar	Stadium: Bezerrão; Attendance: 7,276; Referee: Emerson Almeida Ferreira

18 November 36	Santos	2–0	Figueirense	Santos
19:30 UTC-02:00	Bruno Peres (yellow card) 28'; Rodríguez (yellow card) 39' (goal) 41'; Felipe Anderson 63'; Neymar (yellow card) 68'	Report	(yellow card) 7' Jackson; (yellow card) 65' Guti; (yellow card) 80' Américo	Stadium: Vila Belmiro; Attendance: 10,013; Referee: Cláudio Francisco Lima e Silva

24 November 37	Corinthians	1–1	Santos	São Paulo
19:30 UTC-02:00	Romarinho (yellow card) 71'; Wallace 79'; Guilherme Andrade (yellow card) 90+2'	Report	35' Felipe Anderson; (yellow card) 55' Victor Andrade; (yellow card) 62' André; (yellow card) 79' Adriano	Stadium: Pacaembu; Attendance: 36,482; Referee: Raphael Claus

1 December 38	Santos	3–1	Palmeiras	Santos
19:30 UTC-02:00	Victor Andrade 12'; Neymar 22', 39'; Alan Santos (yellow card) 23' (yellow-red card) 55'		4' Maikon Leite; (yellow card) 17' (yellow-red card) 21' Román	Stadium: Vila Belmiro; Attendance: 11,641; Referee: Guilherme Ceretta de Lima

=== Campeonato Paulista ===
==== Results summary ====
Overall								Home						Away					
Pld	W	D	L	GF	GA	GD	Pts	W	D	L	GF	GA	GD	W	D	L	GF	GA	GD
23	16	3	4	58	21	+37	51	10	1	1	35	8	+27	6	2	3	23	13	+10

Last updated: 13 May 2012.
Source: Soccerway

==== First stage ====
===== League table =====
Pos	Team	Pld	W	D	L	GF	GA	GD	Pts	Qualification or relegation
1	Corinthians	19	14	4	1	28	11	+17	46	Advanced to the Knockout stage
2	São Paulo	19	13	4	2	42	21	+21	43	Advanced to the Knockout stage
3	Santos	19	12	3	4	46	18	+28	39	Advanced to the Knockout stage
4	Guarani	19	11	3	5	26	18	+8	36	Advanced to the Knockout stage
5	Palmeiras	19	10	6	3	37	24	+13	36	Advanced to the Knockout stage

Updated to match(es) played on 15 April 2012. Source: Futpédia and UOL Esporte
Rules for classification: 1st points; 2nd goal difference; 3rd number of goals scored; 4th less red cards; 5th less yellow cards; 6th raffle;

===== Results by round =====
Round	1	2	3	4	5	6	7	8	9	10	11	12	13	14	15	16	17	18	19
Ground	A	H	A	H	H	A	H	A	H	H	A	H	A	A	H	H	A	A	H
Result	D	W	D	D	L	W	W	W	W	W	W	W	L	L	W	W	W	L	W
Position	10	7	7	9	10	8	6	5	4	4	4	3	2	4	4	4	3	3	3

Updated to match(es) played on 15 April 2012. Source: Futpédia
W = Win; D = Draw; L = Loss

===== Matches =====
21 January 1	XV de Piracicaba	1–1	Santos	Piracicaba
19:30 UTC−02:00	André Cunha 90'	Report	(yellow card) 6' Anderson Carvalho; 32' (yellow card) 82' Alan Kardec; (yellow card) 41' Rentería; (yellow card) 87' Crystian	Stadium: Barão da Serra Negra; Attendance: 11,282; Referee: Thiago Duarte Peixoto

26 January 2	Santos	2–1	Ituano	São Caetano do Sul
21:00 UTC−02:00	Emerson (yellow card) 67'; Alan Kardec 73', 90'	Report	28' Kleiton Domingues; (yellow card) 50' Thiago Gomes; (yellow card) 59' Alan Mota; (yellow card) 71' Alex Ferreira	Stadium: Anacleto Campanella; Attendance: 2,203; Referee: Alessandro Darcie

29 January 3	Paulista	1–1	Santos	Jundiaí
19:30 UTC−02:00	Renan Marques 8'; Wellington (yellow card) 36'; Júnior Alves (yellow card) 78' (yellow-red card) 85'	Report	75' Alan Kardec; (yellow card) 87' Anderson Carvalho	Stadium: Jayme Cintra; Attendance: 3,029; Referee: Vinicius Gonçalves Dias Araújo

2 February 4	Santos	1–1	Oeste	Barueri
21:00 UTC−02:00	Ibson 66' (yellow card) 76'; Bruno Rodrigo (yellow card) 74'	Report	(yellow card) 16' Adriano Alves; (yellow card) 33' Cris; 41' Wanderson; (yellow card) 59' Leandro Melo; (yellow card) 70' Roger Gaúcho; (yellow card) 90' Gualberto	Stadium: Arena Barueri; Attendance: 10,364; Referee: Robério Pereira Pires

5 February 5	Santos	1–2	Palmeiras	Presidente Prudente
17:00 UTC−02:00	Neymar 64' (yellow card) 69'; Ibson (yellow card) 76' (yellow-red card) 87'; Pará (yellow card) 79'	Report	(yellow card) 70' Cicinho; 88' Fernandão; 90+2' Juninho	Stadium: Prudentão; Attendance: 25,933; Referee: Luiz Flávio de Oliveira

9 February 6	Botafogo	1–4	Santos	Ribeirão Preto
21:00 UTC−02:00	Camilo 36'; Paulinho (yellow card) 51'; Leandro Carvalho (yellow card) 67'; Tiago Ulisses (yellow card) 76'; Marquinhos (yellow card) 78'	Report	76', 79' (pen.), 90+' Neymar; (yellow card) 81' Alan Kardec; 90+' Felipe Anderson	Stadium: Santa Cruz; Attendance: 12,489; Referee: Flávio Rodrigues Guerra

12 February 7	Santos	4–1	Linense	São Bernardo do Campo
19:30 UTC−02:00	Bruno Rodrigo 27' (yellow card) 43'; Vinicius Simon 61'; Anderson Carvalho (yellow card) 29' (goal) 73'; Dimba 75'; Alan Kardec (yellow card) 79'	Report	(yellow card) 24' Anderson Luis; (yellow card) 35' Andrade; (yellow card) 71' Alexandre Silva; 66' Diego Macedo	Stadium: Primeiro de Maio; Attendance: 4,226; Referee: Marcelo Aparecido Ribeiro de Souza

18 February 8	Mirassol	1–3	Santos	Mirassol
18:30 UTC−02:00	Sérgio Manoel (yellow card) 30'; Márcio Careca (yellow card) 43'; Acleisson (yellow card) 46'; Preto 51'; Xuxa (yellow card) 62'; Gilsinho (yellow card) 63'; Eric (yellow card) 82'; Esley (red card) 89'	Report	11' Juan; 48' (pen.) Borges; (yellow card) 57' Aranha; (yellow card) 61' Ganso; (yellow card) 65' Neymar; 63' Edu Dracena	Stadium: José Maria de Campos Maia; Attendance: 8,116; Referee: Philippe Lombard

22 February 9	Santos	2–0	Comercial	Barueri
19:30 UTC−02:00	Ibson 28'; Durval 81'; Borges (yellow card) 82'	Report	(yellow card) 24' Luís Augusto; (yellow card) 30' Fabão; (yellow card) 55' Leandro Camilo; (yellow card) 76' Jordã; (yellow card) 79' Ricardo Conceição	Stadium: Arena Barueri; Attendance: 5,100; Referee: Aurélio Santanna Martin

25 February 10	Santos	6–1	Ponte Preta	Barueri
18:30 UTC−02:00	Durval (yellow card) 15'; Neymar 27', 77' (yellow card) 64'; Ganso 34'; Edu Dracena 58', 67'; Ferron 56' (o.g.)	Report	(yellow card) 18' Xaves; 51' Uendel; (yellow card) 54' (yellow-red card) 61' Guilherme; (yellow card) 6' (yellow-red card) 69' Cicinho; (red card) 81' Renato Cajá	Stadium: Arena Barueri; Attendance: 10,252; Referee: Marcelo Rogério

29 February 11	Guarani	0–2	Santos	Campinas
19:30 UTC−03:00		Report	6' Ibson; (yellow card) 80' Juan; 89' Arouca	Stadium: Brinco de Ouro; Attendance: 10,720; Referee: Vinícius Gonçalves Dias Araújo

4 March 12	Santos	1–0	Corinthians	Santos
16:00 UTC−03:00	Henrique (yellow card) 50'; Ibson 57'; Fucile (yellow card) 77'	Report	(yellow card) 39' Marquinhos; (yellow card) 79' Élton	Stadium: Vila Belmiro; Attendance: 12,818; Referee: Wilson Luiz Seneme

11 March 13	Mogi Mirim	3–1	Santos	Mogi Mirim
18:30 UTC−03:00	Val 6', 59'; Felipe 54'; Piauí (yellow card) 89'	Report	3' Dimba; (yellow card) 20' Vinicius Simon; (yellow card) 48' Bruno Rodrigo; (yellow card) 57' Elano; (yellow card) 81' Maranhão	Stadium: Romildo Ferreira; Attendance: 3,422; Referee: Leandro Bizzio Marinho

18 March 14	São Paulo	3–2	Santos	São Paulo
16:00 UTC−03:00	Casemiro 8'; Rodrigo Caio (yellow card) (yellow-red card) 25'; Luís Fabiano 64' (pen.); Cícero (yellow card) 53'; Lucas 86'	Report	(yellow card) 15' Ibson; (yellow card) 45+1' Adriano; (yellow card) 47' Durval; 51' Edu Dracena; (yellow card) 59' Paulo Henrique Soares; (yellow card) 63' Rafael; (yellow card) 74' Fucile; 76' Neymar; (yellow card) 77' Felipe Anderson	Stadium: Morumbi; Attendance: 31,972; Referee: Marcelo Aparecido Ribeiro de Souza

25 March 15	Santos	2–0	Bragantino	Santos
18:30 UTC−03:00	Alan Kardec 18'; Adriano (yellow card) 32'; Arouca (yellow card) 54'; Borges 55'	Report	(yellow card) 17' Fernando Gabriel; (yellow card) 31' Júnior Lopes; (yellow card) 49' Léo Jaime; (yellow card) 51' (yellow-red card) 52' Jean Pablo; (yellow card) 73' Reinaldo	Stadium: Vila Belmiro; Attendance: 5,416; Referee: Philippe Lombard

28 March 16	Santos	5–0	Guaratinguetá	Santos
21:00 UTC-03:00	Neymar 3', 42' (pen.), 88' (pen.); Borges 25'; Juan 36'; Ibson (yellow card) 69'; Durval (yellow card) 70'; Fucile (yellow card) 76'	Report	(yellow card) 18' Jeovânio; (red card) 41' Gercimar; (yellow card) 86' Mateus Borelli; (yellow card) 88' Jailson	Stadium: Vila Belmiro; Attendance: 4,449; Referee: Jose Claudio Rocha Filho

1 April 17	Portuguesa	0–2	Santos	São Paulo
16:00 UTC-03:00	Rafael Boquita (yellow card) 14'	Report	49' Rafael Caldeira; 58' Dimba; (yellow card) 66' Alan Kardec	Stadium: Canindé; Attendance: 3,811; Referee: Raphael Claus

8 April 18	São Caetano	2–1	Santos	São Caetano do Sul
18:30 UTC-03:00	Augusto Recife (yellow card) 43'; Marcone (yellow card) 45'; Geovane 57'; Marcelo Costa 66'; Gabriel Valongo (yellow card) 82'; Moradei (yellow card) 90+'	Report	30' Neymar; (yellow card) 42' Arouca	Stadium: Anacleto Campanella; Attendance: 4,283; Referee: Mauricio Antonio Fioretti

15 April 19	Santos	5–0	Catanduvense	Santos
16:00 UTC-03:00	Ganso 23', 70'; Elano (yellow card) 29'; Juan (yellow card) 34'; Borges 30', 83'; Neymar 63'	Report	(yellow card) 37' Luís Mário; (yellow card) 42' Ricardo Oliveira; (yellow card) 57' Carlos Eduardo; (yellow card) 60' Moreilândia; (red card) 88' Jeferson	Stadium: Vila Belmiro; Attendance: 11,660; Referee: Marcio Henrique de Gois

==== Knockout stage ====
===== Quarter-final =====
22 April	Santos	2–0	Mogi Mirim	Santos
16:00 UTC-03:00	Maranhão 22' (yellow card) 24'; Neymar 71'; Juan (yellow card) 88'	Report	(yellow card) 5' Roni; (yellow card) 9' Edson Ratinho; (yellow card) 64' Renê Júnior; (yellow card) 87' Luís Felipe	Stadium: Vila Belmiro; Attendance: 10,635; Referee: Flávio Luís Guerra

===== Semi-final =====
29 April	São Paulo	1–3	Santos	São Paulo
16:00 UTC-03:00	Paulo Miranda (yellow card) 2'; Piris (yellow card) 36'; Cícero (yellow card) 36' (yellow-red card) 83'; Willian José 63'; Rodrigo Caio (yellow card) 90'	Report	3' (pen.), 31', 77' Neymar; (yellow card) 13' Maranhão; (yellow card) 90+2' Aranha	Stadium: Morumbi; Attendance: 47,771; Referee: Paulo César de Oliveira

===== Finals =====
6 May 1st Leg	Guarani	0–3	Santos	São Paulo
16:00 UTC-03:00	Ewerton Páscoa (yellow card) 1'; Fábio Bahia (yellow card) 30'	Report	(yellow card) 28' Adriano; (yellow card) 33' Henrique; 42' Ganso; 65', 90+1' Neymar	Stadium: Morumbi; Attendance: 40,116; Referee: Wilson Seneme

13 May 2nd Leg	Santos	4–2 (7–2 agg.)	Guarani	São Paulo
16:00 UTC-03:00	Alan Kardec 1', 90' (yellow card) 79'; Neymar 8' (pen.), 71' (yellow card) 36'; Juan (yellow card) 69'	Report	4' Fabinho; 16' Bruno Mendes; (yellow card) 33' Bruno Recife; (yellow card) 62' Fábio Bahia	Stadium: Morumbi; Attendance: 53,749; Referee: Paulo César de Oliveira

=== Copa Libertadores ===
==== Group stage ====
Pos	Team	Pld	W	D	L	GF	GA	GD	Pts
1	(Brazil) Santos	6	4	1	1	12	5	+7	13
2	(Brazil) Internacional	6	2	2	2	10	6	+4	8
3	(Bolivia) The Strongest	6	2	1	3	5	11	−6	7
4	(Peru) Juan Aurich	6	2	0	4	4	9	−5	6

15 February 1	The Strongest (Bolivia)	2–1	(Brazil) Santos	La Paz, Bolivia
17:45 UTC−04:00	Parada (yellow card) 3'; Lima (yellow card) 8'; Cristaldo 33'; Ramallo 90'; González (yellow card) 90+2'	Report	9' Henrique; (yellow card) 51' Arouca; (yellow card) 59' Rafael; (yellow card) 76' Neymar; (yellow card) 80' Fucile	Stadium: Estadio Hernando Siles; Referee: (Ecuador) Carlos Vera

7 March 2	Santos (Brazil)	3–1	(Brazil) Internacional	Santos, Brazil
19:30 UTC−03:00	Neymar 19' (pen.), 54', 65' (yellow card) 31'; Juan (yellow card) 56'; Elano (yellow card) 90'	Report	(yellow card) 17' Índio; (yellow card) 30' Elton; (yellow card) 51' D'Alessandro; (yellow card) 52' Bolatti; 65' Leandro Damião; (yellow card) 69' Tinga; (yellow card) 70' Dagoberto	Stadium: Vila Belmiro; Attendance: 12,857; Referee: (Brazil) Evandro Rogério Roman

15 March 3	Juan Aurich (Peru)	1–3	(Brazil) Santos	Chiclayo, Peru
20:00 UTC−05:00	Tejada 14'; Quina (yellow card) 20'; Valencia (yellow card) 38'; Guadalupe (yellow card) 54' (yellow-red card) 57'; Fleitas (yellow card) 65'; Contreras (yellow card) 70'; Guizasola (yellow card) 76'	Report	35' (yellow card) 42' Fucile; 39' Ganso; (yellow card) 44' Juan; (yellow card) 61' Henrique; 68' Borges	Stadium: Estadio Elías Aguirre; Referee: (Uruguay) Roberto Silvera

22 March 4	Santos (Brazil)	2–0	(Peru) Juan Aurich	São Paulo, Brazil
22:00 UTC−03:00	Edu Dracena 15'; Arouca (yellow card) 30'; Neymar 58'	Report	(yellow card) 11' Zúñiga; (yellow card) 32' Ugaz	Stadium: Pacaembu; Attendance: 14,436; Referee: (Argentina) Patricio Loustau

4 April 5	Internacional (Brazil)	1–1	(Brazil) Santos	Porto Alegre, Brazil
21:50 UTC−03:00	Nei 8' (yellow card) 25'; Sandro Silva (yellow card) 24'; Elton (yellow card) 45'; Rodrigo Moledo (yellow card) 74' (yellow-red card) 88'	Report	(yellow card) 29' Neymar; 64' Alan Kardec; (yellow card) 81' Edu Dracena	Stadium: Beira Rio; Attendance: 35,530; Referee: (Brazil) Sandro Meira Ricci

19 April 6	Santos (Brazil)	2–0	(Bolivia) The Strongest	Santos, Brazil
19:45 UTC−03:00	Henrique (yellow card) 23'; Adriano (yellow card) 78'; Alan Kardec 85'; Neymar 87'	Report	(yellow card) 19' Vaca; (yellow card) 20' Reyes; (yellow card) 60' Parada	Stadium: Vila Belmiro; Referee: (Paraguay) Julio Quintana Rodríguez

==== Knockout stage ====
===== Round of 16 =====
25 April 1st Leg	Bolívar (Bolivia)	2–1	(Brazil) Santos	La Paz, Bolivia
20:50 UTC-04:00	Rafael 1' (o.g.); Arce (yellow card) 47'; Frontini (yellow card) 71'; Campos 74'	Report	(yellow card) 26' Durval; 34' Maranhão; (yellow card) 44' Edu Dracena; (yellow card) 90' Rafael	Stadium: Hernando Siles; Attendance: 32,500; Referee: (Chile) Enrique Osses

10 May 2nd Leg	Santos (Brazil)	8–0 (9–2 agg.)	(Bolivia) Bolívar	Santos, Brazil
19:30 UTC-03:00	Elano 6', 50'; Neymar 21' (pen.), 37'; Ganso 28', 53'; Alan Kardec 30'; Borges 61'	Report	(yellow card) 7' Campos; (yellow card) 8' Cantero; (yellow card) 51' Frontini; (yellow card) 83' Valverde	Stadium: Vila Belmiro; Attendance: 15,060; Referee: (Uruguay) Martín Vázquez

===== Quarter-finals =====
17 May 1st Leg	Vélez Sársfield (Argentina)	1–0	(Brazil) Santos	Buenos Aires, Argentina
22:00 UTC-03:00	Papa (yellow card) 29'; Obolo 35'; Cerro (yellow card) 47'; Peruzzi (yellow card) 61'	Report	(yellow card) 13' Rafael; (yellow card) 28' Juan; (yellow card) 65' Neymar; (yellow card) 83' Adriano; (yellow card) 90' Edu Dracena	Stadium: José Amalfitani; Referee: (Paraguay) Carlos Amarilla

24 May 2nd Leg	Santos (Brazil)	1–0 (1–1 agg.) (4–2 p)	(Argentina) Vélez Sársfield	Santos, Brazil
20:00 UTC-03:00	Alan Kardec (yellow card) 36' (goal) 77'; Adriano (yellow card) 42'; Arouca (yellow card) 53'; Neymar (yellow card) 84'	Report	(yellow card) 10' Fernández; (red card) 39' Barovero; (yellow card) 54' Cabral	Stadium: Vila Belmiro; Attendance: 13,908; Referee: (Uruguay) Roberto Silvera
	Penalties
	Alan Kardec (penalty scored); Ganso (penalty scored); Elano (penalty scored); Léo (penalty scored)		(penalty scored) Martínez; (penalty missed) Canteros; (penalty missed) Papa; (penalty scored) Sebá

===== Semi-finals =====
13 June 1st Leg	Santos (Brazil)	0–1	(Brazil) Corinthians	Santos, Brazil
21:50 UTC-03:00	Neymar (yellow card) 75'	Report	28' (yellow card) 57' (yellow-red card) 77' Emerson; (yellow card) 35' Leandro Castán; (yellow card) 70' Alessandro; (yellow card) 90' Cássio; (yellow card) 90+3' Chicão	Stadium: Vila Belmiro; Referee: (Brazil) Marcelo de Lima Henrique

20 June 2nd Leg	Corinthians (Brazil)	1–1 (2–1 agg.)	(Brazil) Santos	São Paulo, Brazil
21:50 UTC-03:00	Danilo 47'	Report	39' Neymar	Stadium: Pacaembu; Referee: (Brazil) Leandro Vuaden
