= Ricardo Oliveira (disambiguation) =

Ricardo Oliveira (born 1980), is a Brazil international football striker

Ricardo Oliveira may also refer to:

- Ricardo Oliveira (footballer, born 1976), Brazilian football midfielder
- Ricardo Oliveira (footballer, born 1982), Brazilian football midfielder
- Ricardo Oliveira (roller hockey) (born 1982), Brazilian roller hockey player
