= Jordá =

Jordá, Jordà, Jorda, or Jordã may refer to:

- Alejandro Jordá, Spanish equestrian
- Claude Jorda, French jurist
- Enrique Jordá (1911–1996), Spanish-American conductor
- Jacques Jorda, French rugby player
- Jordã, Brazilian footballer (Jordã Lima Rodrigues)
- Lou Jorda, American umpire
- Luis Jordá, Spanish musician
- Rafa Jordà, Spanish footballer
- Teresa Jordà (b. 1972), Spanish politician
