= Dimba =

Dimba is a nickname. It may refer to:

- Dimba (footballer, born 1973), Editácio Vieira de Andrade, Brazilian football striker
- Dimba (footballer, born 1992), Marcos Vinícius Gomes de Lima, Brazilian football forward
