= Douglas Dias =

Brazilian footballer (born 1993)

Personal information
- Full name: Wesley Douglas Teixeira Dias de Oliveira
- Date of birth: June 23, 1993 (age 33)
- Place of birth: Iúna, Brazil
- Height: 1.73 m (5 ft 8 in)
- Position: Right back

Team information
- Current team: Rio Branco de Venda Nova

Youth career
- 2009–2013: Santos

Senior career*
Years	Team	Apps	(Gls)
2012–2014	Santos	3	(0)
2014	Icasa	27	(1)
2014–2017	Tombense	9	(0)
2016	→ Tupi (loan)	15	(0)
2017	→ Itumbiara (loan)	10	(0)
2017	Atlético Itapemirim	0	(0)
2018	Nacional–SP	5	(0)
2018	→ Novoperário (loan)	8	(0)
2018	Oeste	0	(0)
2019–2020	Penapolense	17	(0)
2021	Rio Branco de Venda Nova	10	(0)
2021	→ Linense (loan)	6	(0)
2022	Linense	9	(1)
2022	Moto Club	12	(0)
2022	Porto Vitória		
2023	Esporte Clube Democrata	22	(1)
2023	Rio Branco de Venda Nova		
2024–	Itabaiana	15	(0)
- * Club domestic league appearances and goals as of 22:43, 30 March 2024 (UTC)

Wesley Douglas Teixeira Dias de Oliveira (born June 23, 1993), known as Douglas Dias or simply Douglas, is a Brazilian footballer who plays as a right back for Itabaiana.

== Career ==
=== Santos ===
Douglas began his footballing career on Santos FC's youth categories, and made his debut on 1 July 2012, against Portuguesa. He finished the year with three first-team appearances, also appearing on the bench during the 2012 Recopa Sudamericana winning campaign.

=== Icasa ===
On 8 January 2014 Douglas joined Icasa, after his link with Santos expired. Douglas made his league debut against Crato on 19 January 2014. He scored his first goal for the club against Fortaleza on 6 April 2014, scoring in the 47th minute.

=== Tombense ===
He was released from Icasa in July, and joined Tombense in the following month. Douglas made his league debut against Moto Club on 12 October 2014.

=== Tupi ===
Douglas made his league debut against URT on 27 March 2016.

=== Itumbiara ===
Douglas made his league debut against Atlético Goianiense on 13 February 2017.

=== Nacional SP ===
Douglas made his league debut against Sertãozinho on 27 February 2018.

=== Novoperário ===
Douglas made his league debut against Aparecidense on 22 April 2018.

=== Penapolense ===
Douglas made his league debut against Taubaté on 20 January 2019.

=== Rio Branco de Venda Nova ===
Douglas made his league debut against Águia Negra on 27 June 2021.

=== Loan to Linense ===
Douglas made his league debut against São José EC on 28 May 2021.

=== Linense ===
Douglas made his league debut against XV de Piracicaba on 29 January 2022. He scored his first goal for the club against Portuguesa Santista on 16 February 2022, scoring in the 71st minute.

=== Moto Club ===
Douglas made his league debut against Fluminense EC on 22 May 2022.

=== Democrata ===
Douglas made his league debut against Democrata Futebol Clube on 23 January 2023. He scored his first goal for the club against AA Portuguesa (Rio de Janeiro) on 11 June 2023, scoring in the 65th minute.

=== Itabaiana ===
Douglas made his league debut against Carmópolis on 14 January 2024.

== Career statistics ==
As of 6 November 2023

Club	Season	League			State League		Cup		Continental		Other		Total	
Club	Season	Division	Apps	Goals	Apps	Goals	Apps	Goals	Apps	Goals	Apps	Goals	Apps	Goals
Santos	2012	Série A	3	0	0	0	—		0	0	—		3	0
Santos	2013	Série A	0	0	0	0	0	0	—		—		0	0
Santos	Subtotal		3	0	0	0	0	0	0	0	—		3	0
Icasa	2014	Série B	8	0	19	1	0	0	—		—		27	1
Tombense	2014	Série D	2	0	0	0	—		—		—		2	0
Tombense	2015	Série C	7	0	0	0	—		—		—		7	0
Tombense	Subtotal		9	0	0	0	0	0	—		—		9	0
Tupi	2016	Série B	14	0	1	0	—		—		—		15	0
Itumbiara	2017	Série D	2	0	8	0	—		—		—		10	0
Atlético Itapemirim	2017	Capixaba	—		—		—		—		7 (Note: Appearance(s) in Copa Espírito Santo)	0	7	0
Nacional–SP	2018	Paulista A2	—		5	0	—		—		—		5	0
Novoperário	2018	Série D	8	0	—		—		—		—		8	0
Oeste	2018	Série B	0	0	—		—		—		—		0	0
Penapolense	2019	Paulista A2	—		13	0	—		—		—		13	0
Penapolense	2020	Paulista A2	—		4	0	—		—		—		4	0
Penapolense	Subtotal		—		17	0	—		—		—		17	0
Rio Branco de Venda Nova	2020	Capixaba	—		6	0	—		—		—		6	0
Rio Branco de Venda Nova	2021	Série D	10	0	14	0	1	0	—		11 (Note: Nine appearances and a gol in Copa Espírito Santo and two appearances in Copa Verde)	1	36	1
Rio Branco de Venda Nova	Subtotal		10	0	20	0	1	0	—		11	1	42	1
Linense	2021	Paulista A3	—		6	0	—		—		—		6	0
Linense	2022	Paulista A2	—		9	1	—		—		—		9	1
Linense	Subtotal		—		15	1	—		—		—		15	1
Moto Club	2022	Série D	12	0	—		—		—		—		12	0
Porto Vitória	2022	Capixaba B	—		7	0	—		—		—		7	0
Democrata–GV	2023	Série D	14	1	8	0	1	0	—		1 (Note: Appearance(s) in Recopa Mineira)	0	24	1
Rio Branco de Venda Nova	2023	Capixaba B	—		9	0	—		—		—		9	0
Career total			80	1	109	2	2	0	0	0	19	1	210	4

== Honours ==
Santos

- Recopa Sudamericana: 2012

Atlético Itapemirim

- Copa Espírito Santo: 2017
