= Leandro Carvalho =

Leandro Carvalho is a given name. It may refer to:

- Leandro Carvalho (footballer, born 1983), Brazilian football defensive midfielder
- Leandro Carvalho (footballer, born 1995), Brazilian football forward
- Leandrinho (footballer, born 1996), born Leandro Alves de Carvalho, Brazilian football midfielder
