= Victor Andrade =

Brazilian footballer (born 1995)

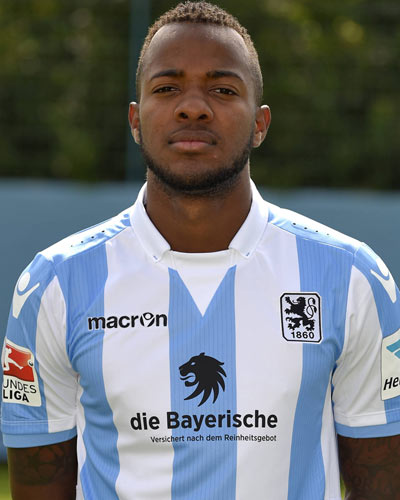
- Andrade in 2016

Personal information
- Full name: Victor Andrade Santos
- Date of birth: 30 September 1995 (age 31)
- Place of birth: Aracaju, Brazil
- Height: 1.71 m (5 ft 7 1/2 in)
- Position: Winger

Team information
- Current team: Náutico
- Number: 11

Youth career
- 2005–2006: Vitória
- 2007: Benfica
- 2007–2012: Santos

Senior career*
Years	Team	Apps	(Gls)
2012–2014	Santos	29	(3)
2014–2016	Benfica B	43	(5)
2015–2017	Benfica	5	(0)
2016	→ Vitória Guimarães (loan)	7	(0)
2016	→ Vitória Guimarães B (loan)	2	(0)
2016–2017	→ 1860 Munich (loan)	7	(1)
2017–2019	Estoril	17	(0)
2018–2019	→ Chapecoense (loan)	15	(1)
2020	Goiás	12	(4)
2021	Suwon FC	2	(0)
2021	Remo	23	(3)
2022–2023	Vila Nova	21	(2)
2023	Juventude	11	(0)
2024	Portuguesa	8	(1)
2024	Ferroviária	15	(2)
2024	Botafogo SP	15	(2)
2025	Ponte Preta	9	(0)
2025–2026	São Bernardo	20	(1)
2026–	Náutico	24	(2)
- * Club domestic league appearances and goals as of 18 November 2026

Victor Andrade Santos (born 30 September 1995) is a Brazilian professional footballer who plays as a winger for Náutico.

== Club career ==
=== Santos ===
Born in Carmópolis, Sergipe, Victor Andrade joined Vitória's youth setup in 2005, aged 10. A year later he moved to Benfica in a trial basis, remaining in the club for a couple of months and appearing in youth tournaments with the Lisbon club. Due to his age, however, he returned to Brazil and signed for Santos in 2007.

In October 2011 he signed a three-year deal with Santos, with a buyout clause set at €50 million. Touted as a next Neymar by the media, he made his professional – and Série A – debut for Santos on 6 June 2012, aged only 16, replacing Alan Kardec in a 1–1 home draw against Fluminense. He went on to score 3 goals in 19 matches in his first season, most notably in a 2–0 home success against Cruzeiro where scored the first and assist another, receiving praise from Muricy Ramalho and Neymar for his performance.

=== Benfica ===
Andrade appeared rarely in the following campaigns, and opted not to renew his contract with Santos. On 11 July 2014, he returned to Benfica, the incumbent title holders, penning a six-year contract and being assigned to the reserves in Segunda Liga. He made his debut on 17 September 2014, replacing Gonçalo Guedes on the 87th minute in a 2–2 home draw with Atlético CP. He scored his first goal on 5 October 2014, netting his side's second in a 2–2 away draw against Feirense, and ended the season with 32 appearances and four goals, including one to Porto B on 17 May 2015.

In 2015–16, Andrade remained assigned to Benfica B; until he received a call-up by Rui Vitória for the match against Estoril on 16 August. He made his debut for the first team against them and assisted Jonas for the 3–0 and also took part in the fourth goal, scored by Nélson Semedo. He played again against Arouca, and Moreirense, but was soon dropped again to the reserve team, as Rui Vitória favoured Gonçalo Guedes for his position. On 31 October, Benfica disclosed on their annual financial report, that Andrade had cost €3.94 million, mostly on agent fees. On 1 February 2016, he joined Vitória de Guimarães on loan until the end of the season. Five days later, he made his debut with Guimarães, and on 20 March, started his first game for them. In April, he was briefly assigned to Vitória Guimarães B. In June 2016, Andrade went on his second loan spell, joining German club 1860 Munich on a season-long deal. On 27 October, he sustained a cruciate ligament rupture to his left knee and was sidelined for six months. He was only fit to play again in May 2017.

=== Estoril ===
On 29 August 2017, Andrade moved to Estoril, penning a three-year deal. A year later, he returned to Brazil to play for Chapecoense, on a one-year loan deal.

=== Back to Brazil ===
On 22 January 2020, after six months without playing at Estoril, Andrade joined Goiás back in his home country. In December, after being rarely used, he left, and moved to South Korean side Suwon FC on 26 February 2021.

On 26 June 2021, after just two matches for Suwon, Andrade moved to Série B side Remo. Regularly used, he cut short his link on 20 November, and signed for fellow league team Vila Nova on 24 January 2022.

Andrade suffered another knee injury on 4 June 2022, being sidelined for the remainder of the year. Back to action only in May 2023, he featured rarely before rescinding his contract on 19 June; on 5 July, he agreed to a deal with Juventude also in the second division.

On 4 November 2023, after only 11 matches, Andrade terminated his contract with Ju, and moved to Portuguesa for the 2024 Campeonato Paulista twenty days later.

== Club statistics ==
As of 18 March 2024

Club	Season	League			State League		Cup		Continental		Other		Total	
Club	Season	Division	Apps	Goals	Apps	Goals	Apps	Goals	Apps	Goals	Apps	Goals	Apps	Goals
Santos	2012	Série A	19	3	—		—		0	0	—		19	3
Santos	2013	Série A	3	0	3	0	0	0	—		—		6	0
Santos	2014	Série A	2	0	2	0	0	0	—		—		4	0
Santos	Total		24	3	5	0	0	0	0	0	—		29	3
Benfica B	2014–15	Segunda Liga	32	4	—		—		—		—		32	4
Benfica B	2015–16	Segunda Liga	11	1	—		—		—		—		11	1
Benfica B	Total		43	5	—		—		—		—		43	5
Benfica	2015–16	Primeira Liga	3	0	—		1	0	1 (Note: Appearance(s) in UEFA Champions League)	0	0	0	5	0
Vitória de Guimarães B	2015–16	Segunda Liga	2	0	—		—		—		—		2	0
Vitória de Guimarães	2015–16	Primeira Liga	7	0	—		—		—		—		7	0
1860 Munich	2016–17	2. Bundesliga	7	1	—		2	0	—		—		9	1
Estoril	2017–18	Primeira Liga	17	0	—		—		—		—		17	0
Chapecoense	2018	Série A	6	0	—		—		—		—		6	0
Chapecoense	2019	Série A	0	0	9	1	2	1	0	0	—		11	2
Chapecoense	Total		6	0	9	1	2	1	0	0	—		17	2
Goiás	2020	Série A	9	2	3	2	3	0	2 (Note: Appearance(s) in Copa Sudamericana)	0	—		17	4
Suwon FC	2021	K League 1	2	0	—		0	0	—		—		2	0
Remo	2021	Série B	23	3	—		—		—		—		23	3
Vila Nova	2022	Série B	8	0	9	2	4	0	—		—		21	2
Vila Nova	2023	Série B	4	0	0	0	0	0	—		—		4	0
Vila Nova	Total		12	0	9	2	4	0	—		—		25	2
Juventude	2023	Série B	11	0	—		—		—		—		11	0
Portuguesa	2024	Paulista	—		8	1	—		—		—		8	1
Career total			166	14	34	6	12	1	3	0	0	0	215	21

== Honours ==
Santos

- Recopa Sudamericana: 2012

Benfica

- Primeira Liga: 2015–16

Brazil U20

- 8 Nations International Tournament: 2012
