= Gercimar =

Brazilian footballer (born 1990)

Personal information
- Full name: Gercimar Maximiliano de Matos Junior
- Date of birth: 28 August 1990 (age 36)
- Place of birth: Planalto, Brazil
- Height: 1.80 m (5 ft 11 in)
- Position: Midfielder

Team information
- Current team: São Caetano

Youth career
- 2008–2009: Ponte Preta

Senior career*
Years	Team	Apps	(Gls)
2009	Ponte Preta		
2010–2012	Guaratinguetá		
2012	CRB		
2013	América–RN		
2013	Rio Branco		
2014–2015	Ituano		
2016–	São Caetano		
- * Club domestic league appearances and goals as of 13 March 2017

Gercimar Maximiliano de Matos Junior (born August 28, 1990), known as Gercimar, is a Brazilian footballer who plays for São Caetano as midfielder.

== Career statistics ==
As of 13 March 2017

Club	Season	League			State League		Cup		Conmebol		Other		Total	
Club	Season	Division	Apps	Goals	Apps	Goals	Apps	Goals	Apps	Goals	Apps	Goals	Apps	Goals
Ponte Preta	2009	Série B	3	0	5	0	1	0	—		—		9	0
Guaratinguetá	2010	Série B	4	0	3	0	—		—		—		7	0
Guaratinguetá	2011	Série B	16	1	16	0	—		—		—		32	1
Guaratinguetá	2012	Série B	—		12	0	—		—		—		12	0
Guaratinguetá	Subtotal		20	1	31	0	—		—		—		51	1
CRB	2012	Série B	9	0	—		—		—		—		9	0
América–RN	2013	Série B	—		2	0	—		—		—		2	0
Rio Branco	2013	Paulista A2	—		—		—		—		6 (Note: All appearance(s) in Copa Paulista)	0	6	0
Ituano	2014	Série D	10	0	11	0	—		—		—		21	0
Ituano	2015	Paulista	—		1	0	2	0	—		8	0	11	0
Ituano	Subtotal		10	0	12	0	2	0	—		8	0	32	0
São Caetano	2016	Paulista A2	—		13	0	—		—		3	0	16	0
São Caetano	2017	Paulista A2	—		7	0	—		—		—		7	0
São Caetano	Subtotal		—		20	0	—		—		3	0	23	0
Career total			42	1	70	0	3	0	0	0	17	0	132	1
