= Vinícius Simon =

Brazilian footballer (born 1986)

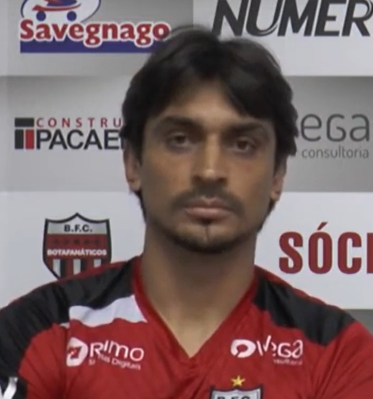
- Vinícius Simon in 2017

Personal information
- Full name: Vinícius Simon
- Date of birth: 17 November 1986 (age 39)
- Place of birth: Limeira, Brazil
- Height: 1.84 m (6 ft 0 in)
- Position: Centre back

Youth career
- 2000–2006: Santos

Senior career*
Years	Team	Apps	(Gls)
2007–2014	Santos	23	(1)
2008	→ Boavista (loan)	5	(0)
2008	→ Portuguesa Santista (loan)	4	(1)
2009	→ Santo André (loan)	8	(1)
2010	→ Criciúma (loan)	10	(1)
2012–2013	→ América Mineiro (loan)	12	(1)
2013	→ Sport Recife (loan)	8	(0)
2015–2016	Vila Nova	50	(1)
2017	XV de Piracicaba	5	(0)
2017	Botafogo–SP	4	(0)
2018	XV de Piracicaba	11	(1)
2018–2022	Confiança	48	(5)
2024	Carmópolis	2	(0)
Total		193	(12)
- * Club domestic league appearances and goals

Vinícius Simon (born 17 November 1986) is a Brazilian retired footballer who played as a central defender.

== Career ==
Born in Limeira, São Paulo, Simon graduated from Santos' prolific youth setup. He made his first team – and Série A – debut on 3 August 2008, starting in a 1–3 home loss against Coritiba.

In January 2009 Simon was loaned to fellow league team Santo André, in a season-long deal. However, he only appeared rarely for Ramalhão, which was subsequently relegated.

On 23 January 2010 Simon joined Criciúma also in a temporary deal. He was regularly used during the year's Campeonato Catarinense, scoring a goal against Joinville on 4 April, and returned to Peixe in May.

Simon was sparingly used in the following years, and moved to América-MG on 26 May 2012, on loan until December. He returned to Santos in January 2013, being again loaned to Sport Recife in July.

In January 2014 Simon was expected to join Goiás, but remained in Santos due to Edu Dracena and Gustavo Henrique's injuries; however, he also suffered an injury, being sidelined until August. On 8 August he returned to action, but only played 26 minutes in a 1–2 away loss against Londrina, being taken off with two hip injuries.

On 6 March 2015 Simon signed a short-term permanent deal with Vila Nova, after being released by Santos in January.

On 1 May 2017 Simon signed with XV de Piracicaba for Campeonato Brasileiro Série D.

== Career statistics ==
Club	Season	League			State League		Cup		Continental		Other		Total	
Club	Season	Division	Apps	Goals	Apps	Goals	Apps	Goals	Apps	Goals	Apps	Goals	Apps	Goals
Santos	2008	Série A	1	0	—		—		—		—		1	0
Santos	2010	Série A	5	0	—		—		—		—		5	0
Santos	2011	Série A	7	0	2	0	—		—		—		9	0
Santos	2012	Série A	1	0	7	1	—		—		—		8	1
Santos	2014	Série A	0	0	0	0	1	0	—		—		1	0
Santos	Subtotal		14	0	9	1	1	0	—		—		24	1
Boavista (loan)	2008	Série C	0	0	5	0	—		—		—		5	0
Portuguesa Santista (loan)	2008	Paulista A2	—		4	1	—		—		—		4	1
Santo André (loan)	2009	Série A	2	0	6	1	—		—		—		8	1
Criciúma (loan)	2010	Série C	0	0	10	1	—		—		—		10	1
América-MG (loan)	2012	Série B	11	1	—		—		—		—		11	1
América-MG (loan)	2013	Série B	0	0	1	0	0	0	—		—		1	0
América-MG (loan)	Subtotal		11	1	1	0	0	0	—		—		12	1
Sport Recife (loan)	2013	Série B	8	0	—		—		1 (Note: Appearance(s) in Copa Sudamericana)	0	—		9	0
Vila Nova	2015	Série C	20	0	7	0	—		—		—		27	0
Vila Nova	2016	Série B	15	1	8	0	—		—		2 (Note: Appearance(s) in Copa Verde)	0	25	1
Vila Nova	Subtotal		35	1	15	0	—		—		2	0	52	1
XV de Piracicaba	2017	Série D	5	0	—		—		—		—		5	0
Botafogo–SP	2017	Série C	4	0	—		—		—		—		4	0
XV de Piracicaba	2018	Paulista A2	—		11	1	—		—		2 (Note: Appearance(s) in Copa Paulista)	0	13	1
Confiança	2018	Série C	12	0	—		—		—		2 (Note: Appearance(s) in Copa do Nordeste)	0	14	0
Confiança	2019	Série C	20	3	9	1	—		—		6	0	35	4
Confiança	2020	Série B	4	1	3	0	—		—		1	0	8	1
Confiança	2021	Série B	0	0	0	0	—		—		0	0	0	0
Confiança	2022	Série C	0	0	3	0	—		—		—		3	0
Confiança	Subtotal		36	4	15	1	—		—		9	0	60	5
Carmópolis	2024	Sergipano	—		2	0	—		—		—		2	0
Career total			115	8	78	4	1	0	1	0	13	0	208	12
