= Eric Goes =

Brazilian footballer (born 1984)

Personal information
- Full name: Eric Batista de Goes
- Date of birth: 23 July 1984 (age 42)
- Place of birth: Osasco, Brazil
- Height: 1.75 m (5 ft 9 in)
- Position: Right back

Senior career*
Years	Team	Apps	(Gls)
2004–2005	Taubaté	19	(2)
2006	Oeste	18	(1)
2007	Rio Claro	11	(1)
2007	Oeste	6	(0)
2008	Rio Claro	16	(0)
2008	Paulista	3	(0)
2008–2009	Juventus	5	(0)
2009–2011	Linense	63	(4)
2011–2012	Mirassol	26	(0)
2012	ASA	0	(0)
2012	Criciúma	14	(2)
2013	Ceará	31	(1)
2013–2014	Oeste	38	(5)
2014	Boa Esporte	11	(1)
2015	Linense	7	(0)
2015	Guarani	2	(0)
2016	Cuiabá	6	(0)
- * Club domestic league appearances and goals as of 31 January 2017

Eric Batista de Goes (born 23 July 1984), simply known as Eric, is a Brazilian retired footballer who played as a right back.

His son Rodrygo is also a footballer, and plays for Spanish La Liga club Real Madrid and Brazil national team.

== Career statistics ==
As of 31 January 2017

Club	Season	League			State League		Cup		Continental		Other		Total	
Club	Season	Division	Apps	Goals	Apps	Goals	Apps	Goals	Apps	Goals	Apps	Goals	Apps	Goals
Linense	2009	Paulista A2	—		—		—		—		13 (Note: All appearance(s) in Copa Paulista)	1	13	1
Linense	2010	Paulista A2	—		18	1	—		—		18	1	36	2
Linense	2011	Paulista	—		14	1	—		—		—		14	1
Linense	Subtotal		—		32	2	—		—		31	2	63	4
Mirassol	2011	Série D	11	0	—		—		—		—		11	0
Mirassol	2012	Série D	—		15	0	—		—		—		15	0
Mirassol	Subtotal		11	0	15	0	—		—		—		26	0
Criciúma	2012	Série B	14	2	—		—		—		—		14	2
Ceará	2013	Série B	4	0	16	0	3	0	—		8 (Note: All appearance(s) in Copa do Nordeste)	1	31	1
Oeste	2013	Série B	21	4	—		—		—		—		21	4
Oeste	2014	Série B	6	0	11	1	—		—		—		17	1
Oeste	Subtotal		27	4	11	1	—		—		—		38	5
Boa Esporte	2014	Série B	11	1	—		—		—		—		11	1
Linense	2015	Paulista	—		7	0	—		—		—		7	0
Guarani	2015	Série C	2	0	—		—		—		—		2	0
Cuiabá	2016	Série C	—		10	1	2	0	—		4 (Note: All appearance(s) in Copa Verde)	0	16	1
Career total			69	7	91	4	5	0	0	0	12	1	177	12
