= Gilsinho (footballer, born 1981) =

Brazilian footballer

Personal information
- Full name: Gilson Adriano de Oliveira
- Date of birth: 13 April 1981 (age 45)
- Place of birth: Monte Azul Paulista, Brazil
- Height: 1.72 m (5 ft 8 in)
- Position: Midfielder

Team information
- Current team: XV de Piracicaba

Senior career*
Years	Team	Apps	(Gls)
2003	Olímpia		
2004	Monte Azul		
2005	Mogi Mirim		
2006	Grêmio Barueri		
2007	Linense		
2008–2009	Noroeste		
2008	→ Ipatinga (loan)		
2009	Taubaté		
2010	Linense		
2010	Remo		
2010	Boa Esporte		
2011	Linense		
2011–2012	Mirassol		
2012	→ América–SP (loan)		
2012	Treze		
2012	Noroeste		
2013	Linense		
2013	ASA		
2014	XV de Piracicaba		
2014	Cuiabá		
2015	Linense		
2015	Cuiabá		
2015	Central		
2016	Barretos		
2016–	XV de Piracicaba		
- * Club domestic league appearances and goals as of 19 January 2017

Gilson Adriano de Oliveira (born April 13, 1981, in Monte Azul Paulista), known as Gilsinho, is a Brazilian footballer who plays as midfielder.

== Career statistics ==
As of 16 January 2017

Club	Season	League			State League		Cup		Conmebol		Other		Total	
Club	Season	Division	Apps	Goals	Apps	Goals	Apps	Goals	Apps	Goals	Apps	Goals	Apps	Goals
Noroeste	2009	Paulista	—		16	0	—		—		—		16	0
Linense	2010	Paulista A2	—		22	5	—		—		—		22	5
Remo	2010	Série D	7	2	—		—		—		—		7	2
Boa Esporte	2010	Série C	6	0	—		—		—		—		6	0
Linense	2011	Paulista	—		16	4	—		—		—		16	4
Mirassol	2011	Série D	11	1	—		—		—		—		11	1
Mirassol	2012	Série D	—		14	2	—		—		—		14	2
Mirassol	Subtotal		11	1	14	2	—		—		—		25	3
Treze	2012	Série C	4	0	—		—		—		—		4	0
Linense	2013	Paulista	—		18	1	—		—		—		18	1
ASA	2013	Série B	3	0	—		2	0	—		—		5	0
XV de Piracicaba	2014	Paulista	—		13	2	—		—		—		13	2
Cuiabá	2014	Série C	14	2	—		3	0	—		—		17	2
Linense	2015	Paulista	—		12	0	—		—		—		12	0
Cuiabá	2015	Série C	12	0	—		2	0	—		—		14	0
Central	2015	Série D	2	0	—		—		—		—		2	0
XV de Piracicaba	2016	Paulista	—		5	0	—		—		15	0	20	0
Career total			59	5	116	14	7	0	0	0	15	0	197	19
