= Adriano (footballer, born May 1987) =

Brazilian footballer

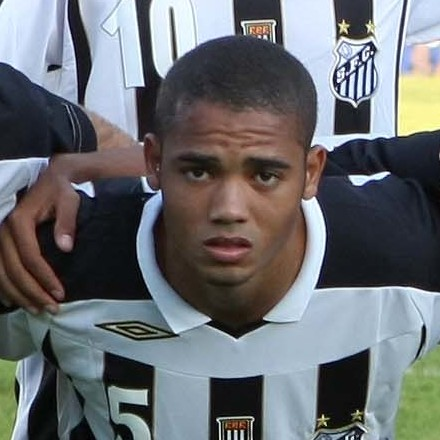
- Adriano with Santos in 2008

Personal information
- Full name: Adriano Bispo dos Santos
- Date of birth: May 29, 1987 (age 39)
- Place of birth: São Vicente, Brazil
- Height: 1.70 m (5 ft 7 in)
- Position: Defensive midfielder

Youth career
- 2002: União Suzano
- 2003: São Vicente
- 2004–2006: Santos

Senior career*
Years	Team	Apps	(Gls)
2006–2013	Santos	151	(0)
2009–2010	→ São Caetano (loan)	34	(1)
2013–2015	Grêmio	26	(0)
2014	→ Vitória (loan)	14	(0)
2015–2016	Avaí	16	(0)
2016	Novorizontino	13	(0)
2016	Goiás	18	(0)
2017–2018	CRB	30	(0)
2018	Santo André	3	(0)
2019	Portuguesa	0	(0)
2020	Imperatriz	10	(0)
2021	Amazonas	6	(0)
Total		321	(1)

International career
2004	Brazil U17		
- * Club domestic league appearances and goals

Adriano Bispo dos Santos (born 29 May 1987), simply known as Adriano, is a Brazilian retired footballer who played as a defensive midfielder.

== Career ==
After progressing on Santos' youth categories, Adriano made his professional debut against Paraná in a 1–0 home victory on November 11, 2006. After 18 minutes on the field, he was sent off with two yellow cards.

On 20 January 2008, Adriano made a performance in a Campeonato Paulista home draw against Palmeiras, marking Jorge Valdivia tightly, and "switching off" the opposition player.

In 2009, Adriano was loaned to São Caetano.

He then returned to Santos in the end of 2010, and in 2011 Copa Libertadores, he became an important first team player, after marking Alejandro Martinuccio (Peñarol's most important player).

Adriano was expected to be a first team player in 2011 FIFA Club World Cup, but he picked up an ankle injury (which needs a surgery) and cannot be registered.

In June 2014, Adriano was loaned by Grêmio to Vitória until the end of the season.

== Career statistics ==
(Correct as of 20 November 2023)

Club	Season	State League		League		Cup		Copa Libertadores		Other^{1}		Total	
Club	Season	Apps	Goals	Apps	Goals	Apps	Goals	Apps	Goals	Apps	Goals	Apps	Goals
Santos	2006	–		1	0	–						1	0
Santos	2007	6	0	24	0	–		0	0	–		30	0
Santos	2008	13	0	21	0	–		6	0	–		40	0
Santos	2009	3	0	–								3	0
Santos	2010	–		5	0	–						5	0
Santos	2011	20	0	21	0	–		14	0	–		55	0
Santos	2012	9	0	29	0	–		8	0	2	0	48	0
Santos	2013	1	0	–								1	0
Santos	Total	52	0	101	0	–		28	0	2	0	183	0
São Caetano (loan)	2009	–		24	1	–						24	1
São Caetano (loan)	2010	10	0	–								10	0
São Caetano (loan)	Total	10	0	24	1	–						34	1
Grêmio	2013	6	0	17	0	–		4	0	–		27	0
Grêmio	2014	3	0	0	0	–		0	0	–		3	0
Grêmio	Total	9	0	17	0	–		4	0	–		30	0
Vitória (loan)	2014	0	0	14	0	–				2	0	16	0
Avaí	2015	0	0	16	0	–						16	0
Novorizontino	2016	13	0	–								13	0
Goiás	2016	0	0	18	0	–						18	0
CRB	2017	15	0	15	0	1	0	–		6	0	37	0
Santo André	2018	3	0	–		–		–		–		3	0
Portuguesa	2019	–		–		–		–		0	0	0	0
Imperatriz	2020	3	0	7	0	1	0	–		7	0	18	0
Amazonas	2021	6	0	–		–		–		–		6	0
Career total		111	0	212	1	2	0	32	0	17	0	374	1

^{1} Including Copa Sudamericana, Recopa Sudamericana and Copa do Nordeste.

== Honours ==
=== Club ===
Santos

- Campeonato Paulista: 2007, 2011, 2012
- Copa Libertadores de América: 2011
- Recopa Sudamericana: 2012
