= Jeferson (footballer, born 1987) =

Brazilian footballer

Personal information
- Full name: Jeferson Francisco dos Santos Barroso
- Date of birth: 17 April 1987 (age 39)
- Place of birth: São Paulo, Brazil
- Height: 1.74 m (5 ft 8 1/2 in)
- Position: Midfielder

Team information
- Current team: São José

Senior career*
Years	Team	Apps	(Gls)
2007–2008	América-SP		
2008–2009	São Bernardo		
2009	Atlético Sorocaba		
2010	Catanduvense		
2010	União Barbarense		
2011–2012	Catanduvense		
2013	Francana		
2013	Concórdia		
2014–2015	Catanduvense		
2016–	São José		
- * Club domestic league appearances and goals as of 12 March 2017

Jeferson Francisco dos Santos Barroso (born April 17, 1987 in São Paulo), known as Jeferson, is a Brazilian footballer who plays for São José as midfielder.

== Career statistics ==
As of 12 March 2017

Club	Season	League			State League		Cup		Conmebol		Other		Total	
Club	Season	Division	Apps	Goals	Apps	Goals	Apps	Goals	Apps	Goals	Apps	Goals	Apps	Goals
Catanduvense	2010	Paulista A2	—		13	0	—		—		—		13	0
Catanduvense	2011	Paulista A2	—		13	1	—		—		—		13	1
Catanduvense	2012	Paulista	—		4	0	—		—		—		4	0
Catanduvense	Subtotal		—		30	1	—		—		—		30	1
Francana	2013	Paulista A3	—		4	0	—		—		—		4	0
Catanduvense	2014	Paulista A2	—		15	0	—		—		—		15	0
Catanduvense	2015	Paulista A2	—		14	1	—		—		—		14	1
Catanduvense	Subtotal		—		29	1	—		—		—		29	1
São José	2016	Paulista A3	—		17	0	—		—		—		17	0
Career total			0	0	80	2	0	0	0	0	0	0	80	2
