= Dimba (footballer, born 1992) =

Brazilian footballer

Personal information
- Full name: Marcos Vinícius Gomes de Lima
- Date of birth: 22 February 1992 (age 34)
- Place of birth: Rialma, Brazil
- Height: 1.79 m (5 ft 10 in)
- Position: Forward

Team information
- Current team: Jaraguá

Youth career
- 2009: Goiás
- 2009–2011: Santos

Senior career*
Years	Team	Apps	(Gls)
2010–2014	Santos	16	(3)
2012	→ Náutico (loan)	5	(1)
2013	→ Botafogo-SP (loan)	10	(2)
2013	→ Boa Esporte (loan)	0	(0)
2014	→ Penapolense (loan)	0	(0)
2014	→ Vila Nova (loan)	15	(1)
2015	Penapolense	4	(0)
2016	CRAC	12	(4)
2016	Audax	4	(0)
2016	Al-Najma	?	(3)
2017	Sertãozinho	5	(0)
2017	Penapolense	0	(0)
2018–2019	Gil Vicente	28	(3)
2019	Aparecida	9	(8)
2020	Vila Nova	6	(0)
2020	Linense	4	(0)
2020	Inhumas	5	(4)
2021–	Jaraguá	2	(0)
- * Club domestic league appearances and goals as of 00:30, 5 March 2021 (UTC)

Marcos Vinícius Gomes de Lima (born 22 February 1992), commonly known as Dimba, is a Brazilian footballer who plays for Jaraguá as a forward.

== Club career ==
Born in Rialma, Goiás, Dimba joined Santos' youth setup in 2009, aged 17, after starting out at Goiás. He made his first-team and Série A debut for Santos on 1 August 2010, coming on as a substitute for Madson in the 79th minute of 2–1 away win against Grêmio Barueri.

On 12 February 2012 Dimba scored his first goal for Peixe, the last of a 4–1 home win against Linense in the Campeonato Paulista championship. He finished the tournament with three goals, as his side were crowned champions.

On 3 September 2012 Dimba was loaned to fellow top-level club Náutico until December. He appeared rarely for the club, scoring once in five matches.

On 8 December 2012, Dimba was loaned to Botafogo-SP, alongside two other players. He appeared sparingly with the club, but managed to score twice in the 2013 Campeonato Paulista.

On 30 July 2013 Dimba joined Boa Esporte, also on loan. After failing to appear with his new side, he joined Penapolense in December, again on loan.

On 10 April 2014 Dimba moved to Vila Nova, yet again in a temporary deal. He was released by Santos in December 2014, after his contract expired.

In January 2015 Dimba returned to Penapolense, now in a permanent deal.

== Career statistics ==
As of 3 November 2023

Club	Season	League			State League		National Cup		Continental		Other		Total	
Club	Season	Division	Apps	Goals	Apps	Goals	Apps	Goals	Apps	Goals	Apps	Goals	Apps	Goals
Santos	2010	Série A	1	0	0	0	—		—		—		1	0
Santos	2011	Série A	0	0	1	0	—		—		—		1	0
Santos	2012	Série A	6	0	8	3	—		2	0	—		16	3
Santos	Subtotal		7	0	9	3	—		2	0	—		18	3
Náutico (loan)	2012	Série A	5	1	—		—		—		—		5	1
Botafogo-SP (loan)	2013	Paulista	—		10	2	—		—		—		10	2
Boa Esporte (loan)	2013	Série B	0	0	—		—		—		—		0	0
Penapolense (loan)	2014	Paulista	—		0	0	—		—		—		0	0
Vila Nova (loan)	2014	Série B	15	1	—		—		—		—		15	1
Penapolense	2015	Paulista	—		4	0	—		—		14	4	18	4
CRAC	2016	Goiano	—		12	4	—		—		—		12	4
Audax	2016	Série D	4	0	—		—		—		—		4	0
Sertãozinho	2017	Paulista A2	—		5	0	—		—		—		5	0
Penapolense	2017	Paulista A2	—		—		—		—		7	3	7	3
Gil Vicente	2017–18	LigaPro	9	1	—		—		—		—		9	1
Gil Vicente	2018–19	Prio	19	3	—		2	0	—		—		21	3
Gil Vicente	Subtotal		28	4	—		2	0	—		—		30	4
Aparecida	2019	Goiano 2ª Divisão	—		9	6	—		—		—		9	6
Vila Nova	2020	Série C	0	0	6	0	2	0	—		—		8	0
Linense	2020	Paulista A3	—		4	0	—		—		—		4	0
Inhumas	2020	Goiano 2ª Divisão	—		5	4	—		—		—		5	4
Jaraguá	2020	Goiano	—		2	0	0	0	—		—		2	0
Jaraguá	2021	Série D	—		7	4	1	0	—		—		8	4
Jaraguá	Subtotal		—		9	4	1	0	—		—		10	4
Patrocinense	2021	Série D	7	0	—		—		—		—		7	0
Inhumas	2021	Goiano 2ª Divisão	—		5	2	—		—		—		5	2
Career total			66	6	78	25	5	0	2	0	21	7	172	38

== Honours ==
Santos

- Campeonato Paulista: 2011, 2012
