= Maranhão (footballer, born 1985) =

Brazilian footballer (born 1985)

Personal information
- Full name: Manoel Messias Barbosa da Silva
- Date of birth: 25 December 1985 (age 40)
- Place of birth: Codó, Brazil
- Height: 1.70 m (5 ft 7 in)
- Position: Right-back

Senior career*
Years	Team	Apps	(Gls)
2005	Gurupi		
2006	Araguaína		
2006	Palmas		
2007	Bragantino		
2008–2009	Guarani	91	(4)
2010–2012	Santos	37	(3)
2011	→ Coritiba (loan)	18	(2)
2012	→ Atlético Paranaense (loan)	24	(1)
2013	Náutico	27	(0)
2014	Boa Esporte	4	(0)
2014–2015	CRB	14	(0)
2016	Itumbiara	8	(0)
2017	Metropolitano	9	(0)
- * Club domestic league appearances and goals

Manoel Messias Barbosa da Silva (born 25 December 1985), commonly known as Maranhão, is a Brazilian retired footballer who played as a right-back.

== Career ==
Born in Codó, Maranhão (which led to his nickname), he began his career in the state of Tocantins, playing for Gurupi (where he nearly quit the sport), Araguaína and Palmas. In 2007, he moved to Bragantino, before joining Guarani in the following year.

Maranhão immediately became a regular starter at Bugre, helping the club to achieve promotion from the 2009 Série B. On 4 January 2010, he agreed to join Santos on a three-year contract.

A backup to Pará, Maranhão became a third-choice after the arrival of Danilo. On 2 January 2011, after a failed move to Avaí, he was loaned to Coritiba.

Back to Santos for the 2012 season, Maranhão was also a second-choice behind new signing Jorge Fucile, and after the arrival of Bruno Peres, he was loaned to Atlético Paranaense on 12 July of that year. On 13 February 2013, he agreed to a two-year deal with Náutico.

In May 2014, after a period without a club, Maranhão joined Boa Esporte. After just four matches, he left for CRB in August.

On 15 January 2016, Maranhão signed for Ituiutaba. On 6 December, he agreed to join Botafogo-PB, but the deal later collapsed and he joined Metropolitano. He retired at the end of the 2017 season, aged 31.

== Career statistics ==
Appearances and goals by club, season and competition
Club	Season	League			State League		Cup		Continental		Other		Total	
Club	Season	Division	Apps	Goals	Apps	Goals	Apps	Goals	Apps	Goals	Apps	Goals	Apps	Goals
Guarani	2008	Série C	29	2	11	0	1	0	—		—		41	2
Guarani	2009	Série B	37	2	14	0	3	0	—		—		54	2
Guarani	Total		66	4	25	0	4	0	—		—		95	4
Santos	2010	Série A	18	2	2	0	4	0	0	0	—		24	2
Santos	2012	Série A	6	0	11	1	—		2 (Note: Appearance(s) in Copa Libertadores)	1	0	0	19	2
Santos	Total		24	2	13	1	4	0	2	1	0	0	43	4
Coritiba (loan)	2011	Série A	13	2	5	0	1	0	—		—		19	2
Atlético Paranaense (loan)	2012	Série B	24	1	—		—		—		—		24	1
Náutico	2013	Série A	18	0	9	0	1	0	—		—		28	0
Boa Esporte	2014	Série B	4	0	—		—		—		—		4	0
CRB	2014	Série C	3	0	—		—		—		—		3	0
CRB	2015	Série B	5	0	6	0	1	0	—		3 (Note: Appearance(s) in Copa do Nordeste)	0	15	0
CRB	Total		8	0	6	0	1	0	—		3	0	18	0
Itumbiara	2016	Goiano	—		8	0	—		—		—		8	0
Metropolitano	2017	Série D	—		9	0	—		—		—		9	0
Career total			167	9	75	1	11	0	2	1	3	0	261	11

== Honours ==
Santos

- Campeonato Paulista: 2012
- Copa do Brasil: 2010

Coritiba

- Campeonato Paranaense: 2011
