= Ricardo Conceição =

Brazilian footballer (born 1984)

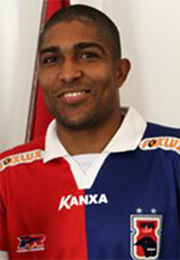

Personal information
- Full name: Ricardo Renato de Conceição
- Date of birth: 16 July 1984 (age 42)
- Place of birth: Campinas, Brazil
- Height: 1.75 m (5 ft 9 in)
- Position: Midfielder

Team information
- Current team: Atlético Tubarão

Senior career*
| Years | Team | Apps | (Gls) |
| 2004–2008 | Ponte Preta | | |
| 2009–2010 | Santo André | | |
| 2010 | Vitória | | |
| 2011 | São Caetano | | |
| 2012 | Comercial–SP | | |
| 2012–2015 | Paraná | | |
| 2014 | → Chapecoense (loan) | | |
| 2015–2016 | Ceará | | |
| 2017– | Atlético Tubarão | | |
- * Club domestic league appearances and goals as of 8 March 2017

Ricardo Renato de Conceição (born July 16, 1984), known as Ricardo Conceição, is a Brazilian footballer who plays for Atlético Tubarão as midfielder.

== Career statistics ==
As of 8 March 2017

| Club | Season | League | | | State League | | Cup | | Conmebol | | Other | | Total | |
| Club | Season | Division | Apps | Goals | Apps | Goals | Apps | Goals | Apps | Goals | Apps | Goals | Apps | Goals |
|---|---|---|---|---|---|---|---|---|---|---|---|---|---|---|
| Ponte Preta | 2008 | Série B | 24 | 1 | 16 | 1 | — | | — | | — | | 40 | 2 |
| Santo André | 2009 | Série A | 31 | 1 | 16 | 0 | — | | — | | — | | 47 | 1 |
| Santo André | 2010 | Série B | — | | 15 | 2 | — | | — | | — | | 15 | 2 |
| Santo André | Subtotal | | 31 | 1 | 31 | 2 | — | | — | | — | | 62 | 3 |
| Vitória | 2010 | Série A | 27 | 1 | — | | — | | 2 | 0 | — | | 29 | 1 |
| São Caetano | 2011 | Série B | 25 | 0 | 9 | 0 | — | | — | | — | | 34 | 0 |
| Comercial–SP | 2012 | Paulista | — | | 13 | 0 | — | | — | | — | | 13 | 0 |
| Paraná Clube | 2012 | Série B | 28 | 0 | — | | — | | — | | — | | 28 | 0 |
| Paraná Clube | 2013 | Série B | 29 | 3 | 15 | 2 | 2 | 0 | — | | — | | 46 | 5 |
| Paraná Clube | 2014 | Série B | — | | 6 | 0 | 1 | 0 | — | | — | | 7 | 0 |
| Paraná Clube | 2015 | Série B | — | | 6 | 0 | 1 | 0 | — | | — | | 7 | 0 |
| Paraná Clube | Subtotal | | 57 | 3 | 27 | 2 | 4 | 0 | — | | — | | 88 | 5 |
| Chapecoense | 2014 | Série A | 19 | 2 | — | | — | | — | | — | | 19 | 2 |
| Ceará | 2015 | Série B | 7 | 0 | — | | — | | — | | — | | 7 | 0 |
| Ceará | 2016 | Série B | — | | 6 | 1 | — | | — | | 3 (Note: All appearance(s) in Copa do Nordeste) | 0 | 9 | 1 |
| Ceará | Subtotal | | 7 | 0 | 6 | 1 | — | | — | | 3 | 0 | 16 | 1 |
| Atlético Tubarão | 2017 | Catarinense | — | | 5 | 1 | — | | — | | — | | 5 | 1 |
| Career total | | | 190 | 8 | 107 | 7 | 4 | 0 | 2 | 0 | 3 | 0 | 306 | 15 |
