= Ricardo Oliveira (footballer, born 1976) =

Brazilian footballer

Personal information
- Full name: Ricardo Lopes de Oliveira
- Date of birth: 28 October 1976 (age 50)
- Place of birth: Rio de Janeiro, Brazil
- Height: 1.72 m (5 ft 7 1/2 in)
- Position: Midfielder

Team information
- Current team: América (RN)

Senior career*
Years	Team	Apps	(Gls)
- ?
2000	Nacional (AM)		
- ?
2003	São Raimundo (AM)		
- ?
2005	Ituano		
2006	Cabofriense	0	(0)
2006–2007	Paysandu		
2007	Remo		
2008	São Bento	0	(0)
2008	Toledo (PR)	9	(1)
2008–2009	Joinville	0	(0)
2009	América (RN)	32	(0)
2010	Mogi Mirim	0	(0)
2010–2011	ABC	24	(0)
2012–	América (RN)		
- * Club domestic league appearances and goals as of 17 October 2011

Ricardo Lopes de Oliveira (born 28 October 1976) is a Brazilian footballer who plays for América de Natal.

== Biography ==
Born in Rio de Janeiro, Ricardo Oliveira had played for Nacional and São Raimundo of Amazonas state at Copa do Brasil.

In December 2004, he signed a 1-year contract with Ituano and played 4 times in 2005 Copa do Brasil. He then left for Cabofriense, signed a contract until the end of 2006 Campeonato Carioca. In April he signed a contract until the end of year 2006 for Paysandu. In January 2007 he extended his contract for another year, and played 4 times in 2007 Copa do Brasil. In August he left for city rival Remo for 2007 Campeonato Brasileiro Série B.

In December he left for São Bento but released in February 2008. He left for Paraná club Toledo Colônia Work in July. He played 9 matches in 2008 Campeonato Brasileiro Série C and the team failed to qualify to the third stage. He was signed by Joinville in October, agreed a contract until May 2009. He finished as the runner-up of 2008 Copa Santa Catarina and the third place of 2009 Campeonato Catarinense.

In May 2009 he signed a 1-year contract with América de Natal and played regularly in 2009 Campeonato Brasileiro Série B.

In December 2009, he was signed by Mogi Mirim and played 18 matches of 2010 Campeonato Paulista. In May he was signed by ABC for 2010 Campeonato Brasileiro Série C and Campeonato do Nordeste. He was the captain of the team, only missed round 2 and round 8 in Série C. ABC won promotion to 2011 Campeonato Brasileiro Série B in November.
