= Alan Mota =

Brazilian footballer (born 1986)

Personal information
- Full name: Alan Girotto Mota
- Date of birth: 12 September 1986 (age 40)
- Place of birth: São Paulo, Brazil
- Height: 1.85 m (6 ft 1 in)
- Position: Midfielder

Team information
- Current team: Taubaté

Senior career*
Years	Team	Apps	(Gls)
2006–2007	Taboão da Serra	0	(0)
2008	Marília	0	(0)
2009	Bragantino	4	(0)
2010–2011	Audax	0	(0)
2011–2012	Ituano	0	(0)
2012	→ Grêmio Barueri (loan)	9	(0)
2013	América Mineiro	0	(0)
2013	Botafogo–SP	8	(0)
2014	Capivariano	0	(0)
2014	Beira-Mar	6	(0)
2015	Nacional–SP	0	(0)
2016	Taubaté	0	(0)
2016	Mogi Mirim	13	(1)
2016	Água Santa	0	(0)
2017–	Taubaté		
- * Club domestic league appearances and goals as of 7 March 2017

Alan Girotto Mota (born September 12, 1986 in São Paulo), known as Alan Mota, is a Brazilian footballer who plays for Taubaté as midfielder.

== Career statistics ==
As of 7 March 2017

Club	Season	League			State League		Cup		Conmebol		Other		Total	
Club	Season	Division	Apps	Goals	Apps	Goals	Apps	Goals	Apps	Goals	Apps	Goals	Apps	Goals
Bragantino	2009	Série B	4	0	8	0	—		—		—		12	0
Audax	2010	Paulista A2	—		19	0	—		—		—		19	0
Audax	2011	Paulista A2	—		4	0	—		—		—		4	0
Audax	Subtotal		—		23	0	—		—		—		23	0
Ituano	2012	Paulista	—		16	0	—		—		—		16	0
Grêmio Barueri	2012	Série B	9	0	—		—		—		—		9	0
América Mineiro	2013	Série B	—		1	0	—		—		—		1	0
Botafogo–SP	2013	Série D	8	0	—		—		—		—		8	0
Capivariano	2014	Paulista A2	—		8	0	—		—		—		8	0
Beira-Mar	2014–15	LigaPro	6	0	—		2	0	—		—		8	0
Taubaté	2016	Paulista A2	—		18	0	—		—		—		18	0
Mogi Mirim	2016	Série C	13	1	—		—		—		—		13	1
Água Santa	2016	Paulista	—		—		—		—		3	0	3	0
Taubaté	2017	Paulista A2	—		8	0	—		—		—		8	0
Career total			40	1	82	0	2	0	0	0	3	0	127	1
