= Américo (footballer) =

Brazilian footballer (born 1993)

Personal information
- Full name: Américo Martins Pereira Júnior
- Date of birth: March 19, 1993 (age 33)
- Position: Defender

Team information
- Current team: Cabofriense

Senior career*
Years	Team	Apps	(Gls)
2012–2013	Figueirense	4	(0)
2014	Nacional Esporte Clube	5	(0)
2015	Inter de Lages	2	(0)
2016	Cascavel	5	(0)
2017	Bonsucesso	11	(0)
2017	Macaé	4	(0)
2018–	Cabofriense	3	(0)
- * Club domestic league appearances and goals as of March 15, 2018

Américo Martins Pereira Júnior, commonly known as Américo, (born March 19, 1993) is a Brazilian professional footballer who plays for Cabofriense as a defender.
