= Leandro Melo =

Brazilian footballer

Personal information
- Full name: Leandro Domingos de Melo
- Date of birth: 11 March 1986 (age 40)
- Place of birth: Tubarão, Brazil
- Height: 1.76 m (5 ft 9 in)
- Position: Midfielder

Team information
- Current team: América RN

Senior career*
| Years | Team | Apps | (Gls) |
| 2007 | Próspera | | |
| 2008–2009 | Oeste | | |
| 2009 | → Camboriu (loan) | | |
| 2010 | São Bento | | |
| 2010 | Oeste | 5 | (0) |
| 2011 | Metropolitano | | |
| 2011 | Farroupilha | | |
| 2011 | Marcílio Dias | | |
| 2011 | → Oeste (loan) | 11 | (0) |
| 2012 | Oeste | 0 | (0) |
| 2012 | Marcílio Dias | 0 | (0) |
| 2012 | Esportivo | | |
| 2013 | Guarani de Palhoça | 0 | (0) |
| 2013 | Metropolitano | 9 | (0) |
| 2014 | Juventude | 0 | (0) |
| 2014–2016 | Oeste | 41 | (0) |
| 2016–2017 | São Bento | 12 | (0) |
| 2018 | Hercílio Luz | 0 | (0) |
| 2018 | Criciúma | 0 | (0) |
| 2019 | Metropolitano | 0 | (0) |
| 2019– | América RN | 8 | (0) |
| 2019 | → Oeste (loan) | 2 | (0) |
- * Club domestic league appearances and goals as of 14:43, 19 February 2020 (UTC)

Leandro Domingos de Melo (born March 11, 1986, in Tubarão), known as Leandro Melo, is a Brazilian footballer who plays for América RN as midfielder.

== Career statistics ==
As of 7 March 2017

| Club | Season | League | | | State League | | Cup | | Conmebol | | Other | | Total | |
| Club | Season | Division | Apps | Goals | Apps | Goals | Apps | Goals | Apps | Goals | Apps | Goals | Apps | Goals |
|---|---|---|---|---|---|---|---|---|---|---|---|---|---|---|
| Oeste | 2009 | Paulista | — | | 9 | 0 | — | | — | | — | | 9 | 0 |
| São Bento | 2010 | Paulista A2 | — | | 15 | 0 | — | | — | | — | | 15 | 0 |
| Oeste | 2010 | Série D | 5 | 0 | — | | — | | — | | — | | 5 | 0 |
| Metropolitano | 2011 | Série D | — | | 11 | 0 | — | | — | | — | | 11 | 0 |
| Oeste | 2011 | Série D | 11 | 0 | — | | — | | — | | — | | 11 | 0 |
| Oeste | 2012 | Série C | — | | 7 | 0 | — | | — | | — | | 7 | 0 |
| Oeste | Subtotal | | 11 | 0 | 7 | 0 | — | | — | | — | | 18 | 0 |
| Marcílio Dias | 2012 | Catarinense | — | | 4 | 0 | — | | — | | — | | 4 | 0 |
| Guarani de Palhoça | 2013 | Catarinense | — | | 16 | 0 | — | | — | | — | | 16 | 0 |
| Metropolitano | 2013 | Série D | 9 | 0 | — | | — | | — | | — | | 9 | 0 |
| Juventude | 2014 | Série C | — | | 12 | 0 | — | | — | | — | | 12 | 0 |
| Oeste | 2014 | Série B | 23 | 0 | — | | — | | — | | — | | 23 | 0 |
| Oeste | 2015 | Série B | 18 | 0 | 12 | 1 | — | | — | | — | | 30 | 1 |
| Oeste | 2016 | Série B | — | | 8 | 0 | — | | — | | — | | 8 | 0 |
| Oeste | Subtotal | | 41 | 0 | 20 | 1 | — | | — | | — | | 61 | 1 |
| São Bento | 2016 | Série D | 11 | 0 | — | | — | | — | | — | | 11 | 0 |
| São Bento | 2017 | Série C | — | | 2 | 0 | 1 | 0 | — | | — | | 3 | 0 |
| São Bento | Subtotal | | 11 | 0 | 2 | 0 | 1 | 0 | — | | — | | 14 | 0 |
| Career total | | | 77 | 0 | 96 | 1 | 1 | 0 | 0 | 0 | 0 | 0 | 174 | 1 |
