= Jackson (footballer, born August 1990) =

Brazilian footballer

Personal information
- Full name: Jackson Fernando de Sousa
- Date of birth: 18 August 1990 (age 36)
- Place of birth: São José, Santa Catarina, Brazil
- Height: 1.73 m (5 ft 8 in)
- Position: Midfielder

Team information
- Current team: Camboriú

Youth career
- 2008–2010: Figueirense

Senior career*
Years	Team	Apps	(Gls)
2011–2015	Figueirense	32	(0)
2013	→ Metropolitano (loan)	0	(0)
2014	→ Tombense	0	(0)
2014–2015	→ Santo André	0	(0)
2015	ABC	3	(0)
2016	Maringá	0	(0)
2017	Ypiranga	0	(0)
2018	Hercílio Luz	0	(0)
2019	Ríver		
2019–	Camboriú		
- * Club domestic league appearances and goals as of 25 February 2018

Jackson Fernando de Sousa (born 18 August 1990), known as Jackson, is a Brazilian footballer who plays for Camboriú as a midfielder.

== Career statistics ==
As of 6 March 2017

Club	Season	League			State League		Cup		Continental		Other		Total	
Club	Season	Division	Apps	Goals	Apps	Goals	Apps	Goals	Apps	Goals	Apps	Goals	Apps	Goals
Figueirense	2011	Série A	7	0	4	0	—		—		—		11	0
Figueirense	2012	Série A	25	0	4	0	—		2	0	—		31	0
Figueirense	2013	Série B	—		10	1	1	0	—		—		11	1
Figueirense	Subtotal		32	0	18	1	1	0	2	0	—		53	1
Metropolitano	2013	Série D	—		—		—		—		6 (Note: All appearance(s) in Copa Santa Catarina)	0	6	0
Tombense	2014	Série D	—		6	0	0	0	—		—		6	0
Santo André	2014	Paulista A2	—		—		—		—		19 (Note: All appearance(s) in Copa Paulista)	0	19	0
Santo André	2015	Paulista A2	—		14	0	1	0	—		—		15	0
Santo André	Subtotal		—		14	0	1	0	—		19	0	34	0
ABC	2015	Série D	3	0	—		—		—		—		3	0
Maringá	2016	Paranaense	—		6	1	—		—		—		6	1
Ypiranga	2017	Série C	—		2	0	—		—		—		2	0
Career total			35	0	46	2	2	0	2	0	25	0	110	2
