= Mateus Borelli =

Brazilian footballer

Personal information
- Full name: Mateus da Silva Santos Borelli
- Date of birth: 19 October 1993 (age 33)
- Place of birth: Brazil
- Position: Midfielder

Team information
- Current team: Almirante Barroso

Youth career
- 2010–2011: Red Bull Brasil

Senior career*
Years	Team	Apps	(Gls)
2012–2013	Guaratinguetá		
2015	Rio Branco		
2017–	Almirante Barroso		
- * Club domestic league appearances and goals as of 13 March 2017

Mateus da Silva Santos Borelli (born October 19, 1993), known as Mateus Borelli, is a Brazilian footballer who plays for Almirante Barroso as midfielder.

== Career statistics ==
As of 13 March 2017

Club	Season	League			State League		Cup		Conmebol		Other		Total	
Club	Season	Division	Apps	Goals	Apps	Goals	Apps	Goals	Apps	Goals	Apps	Goals	Apps	Goals
Guaratinguetá	2012	Série B	3	0	4	0	—		—		—		7	0
Guaratinguetá	2013	Série B	—		1	0	—		—		—		1	0
Guaratinguetá	Subtotal		3	0	5	0	—		—		—		8	0
Rio Branco	2015	Paulista A2	—		5	0	—		—		5 (Note: All appearance(s) in Copa Paulista)	0	10	0
Career total			3	0	10	0	0	0	0	0	5	0	18	0
