= Gérson Magrão =

Brazilian footballer (born 1985)

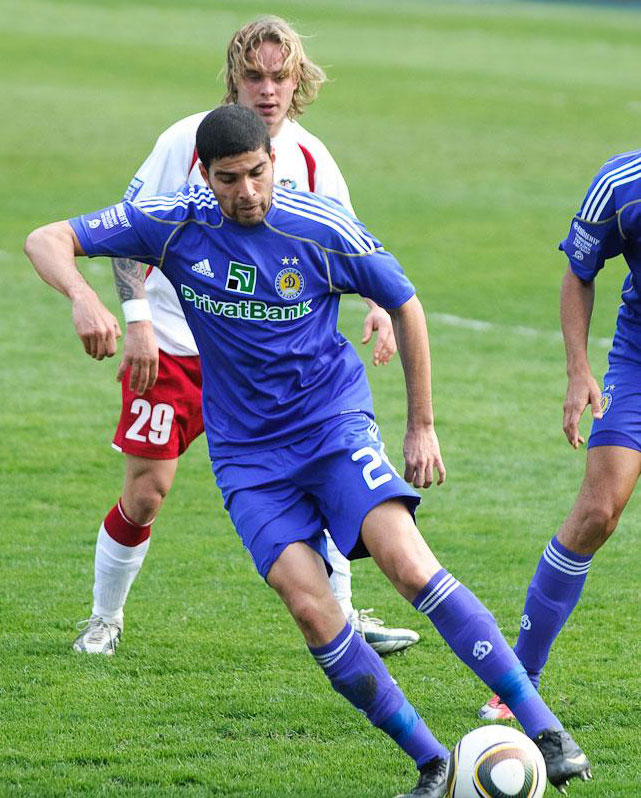
- Magrão playing for Dynamo Kyiv in 2010

Personal information
- Full name: Gérson Alencar de Lima Júnior
- Date of birth: 13 June 1985 (age 41)
- Place of birth: Diadema, Brazil
- Height: 1.81 m (5 ft 11 in)
- Position: Attacking midfielder

Team information
- Current team: Ipatinga

Youth career
- Cruzeiro

Senior career*
Years	Team	Apps	(Gls)
2004	Cruzeiro	0	(0)
2004–2007	Feyenoord	6	(0)
2007	Flamengo	1	(0)
2007–2008	Ipatinga	26	(1)
2008–2009	Cruzeiro	28	(2)
2009–2012	Dynamo Kyiv	27	(3)
2012	Santos	24	(0)
2013	Figueirense	2	(0)
2013–2014	Sporting CP	9	(0)
2013–2014	Sporting CP B	5	(1)
2015	CRB	19	(2)
2016	XV de Piracicaba	5	(1)
2016	CRB	30	(4)
2017–2018	América Mineiro	43	(2)
2019	Ponte Preta	42	(2)
2020–2021	Vitória	27	(0)
2021	Betim Futebol	6	(2)
2021–2022	Ituano	53	(7)
2023	Santo André	11	(1)
2023	Ferroviária	6	(0)
2023–2024	Botafogo-PB	11	(1)
2024–	Ipatinga	8	(1)
- * Club domestic league appearances and goals as of 18:18, 5 May 2024 (UTC)

Gérson Alencar de Lima Júnior (born 13 June 1985), known as Gérson Magrão, is a Brazilian footballer who plays as an attacking midfielder for Ipatinga.

Magrão has played professionally in Brazil, the Netherlands, Ukraine and Portugal.

== Career ==
Born in Diadema, Gérson Magrão started his career with Cruzeiro in 2004 but didn't make a league appearance before leaving to join Dutch Eredivisie club Feyenoord, he remained with the Rotterdam club until 2007 when he left to return to Brazil after appearing in just six league matches. On his return to Brazil, Gérson Magrão had a short stint with Flamengo before signing with Ipatinga for two years. He played 26 times for Ipatinga and scored his first professional league goal in a 4–2 defeat away to Atlético Mineiro on 13 June 2008. After this, he returned to his first professional club, Cruzeiro, where he made 28 appearances between 2008 and 2009, he scored twice for the club during that time. He made his Copa Libertadores debut with Cruzeiro on 19 March 2009 against Club Universitario.

In 2009, Gérson Magrão left Brazil for the second time in his career as he agreed to join Ukrainian side Dynamo Kyiv, who were the defending Premier League champions at the time. He made his Dynamo debut on 23 August against Vorskla Poltava, three weeks later he received his first career red card in a Ukrainian Cup match versus Metalist Kharkiv. Things improved for Gérson Magrão later that month as he played and scored on his UEFA Champions League debut on 16 September against Rubin Kazan, he played in all six of Dynamo's 2009–10 group stage fixtures as the club finished bottom of a group that also included Barcelona and Inter Milan. He made a total of 28 appearances in his debut season with Dynamo. He made just 10 appearances for Dynamo in their 2010–11 season before departing the club at the beginning of the 2011–12 season.

Gérson Magrão spent the 2012 season with Santos, before playing with Figueirense for the 2013 season. He signed for Portuguese club Sporting CP in July 2013. Magrão left Sporting in May 2014, after only one season with the club after making just ten appearances in all competitions; during his time in Portugal he played five times and scored one for Sporting CP B. On 30 April 2015, Gérson Magrão joined Série B side CRB. He made 19 appearances and scored twice for CRB during 2015 in Série B, whilst also making one appearance in the Copa do Brasil. In 2016, Gérson Magrão signed for Piracicaba and made his debut for the team on 17 February in the Campeonato Paulista. In total, he made 5 appearances and scored once (in his penultimate appearance against São Bernardo) before leaving on 12 April.

== Honours ==
Flamengo

- Campeonato Carioca: 2007

Cruzeiro

- Campeonato Mineiro: 2009

Santos

- Campeonato Paulista: 2012
- Recopa Sudamericana: 2012

CRB

- Campeonato Alagoano: 2015

América Mineiro

- Campeonato Brasileiro Série B: 2017
