= Ricardo Oliveira (footballer, born 1982) =

Brazilian footballer

Personal information
- Full name: Ricardo Oliveira dos Santos
- Date of birth: 3 November 1982 (age 44)
- Place of birth: Presidente Epitácio, Brazil
- Height: 1.78 m (5 ft 10 in)
- Position: Midfielder

Senior career*
Years	Team	Apps	(Gls)
2004	Figueirense		
2005	Santacruzense		
2006–2008	São Caetano		
2007–2008	→ XV de Piracicaba (loan)		
2008–2009	Catanduvense		
2009	Guaratinguetá		
2009–2010	Catanduvense		
2010	Américo		
2010	Camboriú		
2011–2012	Catanduvense		
2012–2013	Oeste		
2013	→ Comercial–SP (loan)		
2013	Rio Branco		
2014	Guarani		
2015	Catanduvense		
- * Club domestic league appearances and goals as of 10 March 2017

Ricardo Oliveira dos Santos (born November 3, 1982, in Presidente Epitácio), known as Ricardo Oliveira, is a Brazilian footballer who plays as midfielder.

== Career statistics ==
As of 10 March 2017

Club	Season	League			State League		Cup		Conmebol		Other		Total	
Club	Season	Division	Apps	Goals	Apps	Goals	Apps	Goals	Apps	Goals	Apps	Goals	Apps	Goals
Guaratinguetá	2009	Série B	3	0	—		—		—		—		3	0
Catanduvense	2010	Paulista A2	—		14	1	—		—		—		14	1
Catanduvense	2011	Paulista A2	—		15	0	—		—		—		15	0
Catanduvense	2012	Paulista	—		16	0	—		—		—		16	0
Catanduvense	Subtotal		—		45	1	—		—		—		45	1
Oeste	2012	Série C	17	2	—		—		—		—		17	2
Oeste	2013	Série B	—		3	0	—		—		—		3	0
Oeste	Subtotal		17	2	3	0	—		—		—		20	2
Comercial–SP	2013	Paulista A2	—		10	1	—		—		—		10	1
Rio Branco	2013	Série C	6	0	—		—		—		—		6	0
Guarani	2014	Série C	—		10	1	0	0	—		—		10	1
Catanduvense	2015	Paulista A2	—		15	0	—		—		—		15	0
Career total			26	2	83	3	0	0	0	0	0	0	109	5
