= Júnior Alves (footballer, born 1990) =

Brazilian footballer

Personal information
- Full name: José Teixeira Alves Júnior
- Date of birth: 26 March 1990 (age 36)
- Place of birth: São Paulo, Brazil
- Height: 1.94 m (6 ft 4 in)
- Position: Defender

Youth career
- 2007–2008: União Suzano
- 2008–2009: Avaí

Senior career*
Years	Team	Apps	(Gls)
2010–2011	Avaí		
2010	→ Olé Brasil (loan)		
2011	→ Paulista (loan)		
2012	Paulista		
2013	Grêmio Barueri		
2013	→ Thespakusatsu (loan)		
2014	Mirassol		
2014–2015	São Bernardo		
2015	→ São Caetano (loan)		
2015–2017	São Caetano		
2017–2019	Caxias	12	(4)
2019–2020	São Caetano	32	(3)
2020	São Luiz	11	(1)
2021	Esportivo	11	(1)
2021	Oeste	14	(0)
2022	Lemense	9	(0)
- * Club domestic league appearances and goals

José Teixeira Alves Júnior (born 26 March 1990), known as Júnior Alves, is a Brazilian former professional footballer who played as defender.

== Career statistics ==
As of 7 March 2017

Appearances and goals by club, season and competition
Club	Season	League			State League		Cup		Conmebol		Other		Total	
Club	Season	Division	Apps	Goals	Apps	Goals	Apps	Goals	Apps	Goals	Apps	Goals	Apps	Goals
Olé Brasil	2010	Paulista B	—		17	4	—		—		—		17	4
Paulista	2011	Paulista	—		—		—		—		18 (Note: Appearance(s) in Copa Paulista)	1	18	1
Paulista	2012	Paulista	—		11	1	0	0	—		4	0	15	1
Paulista	Total		0	0	11	1	0	0	0	0	22	1	33	2
Thespakusatsu	2013	J2 League	0	0	—		—		—		—		0	0
Mirassol	2014	Paulista A2	—		18	0	—		—		—		18	0
São Bernardo	2014	Paulista	—		—		—		—		13	1	13	1
São Caetano	2015	Série D	12	0	13	1	—		—		—		25	1
São Caetano	2016	Paulista A2	—		18	1	—		—		—		18	1
São Caetano	2017	Paulista A2	—		1	0	—		—		—		1	0
São Caetano	Total		12	0	32	2	0	0	0	0	0	0	44	2
Career total			12	0	78	7	0	0	0	0	35	2	125	9

== Honours ==
Paulista de Jundiaí

- Copa Paulista: 2011

São Caetano

- Campeonato Paulista Série A2: 2017, 2020
- Copa Paulista: 2019
