= Jordã =

Brazilian footballer (born 1983)

Personal information
- Full name: Jordã Lima Rodrigues
- Date of birth: 10 August 1983 (age 43)
- Place of birth: Salvador, Brazil
- Height: 1.73 m (5 ft 8 in)
- Position: Midfielder

Team information
- Current team: URT

Senior career*
Years	Team	Apps	(Gls)
2006–2008	Linense		
2009	Grêmio Osasco		
2010–2012	Comercial–SP		
2012	→ Brasiliense (loan)		
2013	Brasiliense		
2013	Linense		
2014	Votuporanguense		
2015–2016	Uberlândia		
2016	→ Comercial–SP (loan)		
2016	Comercial–SP		
2017–	URT		
- * Club domestic league appearances and goals as of 8 March 2017

Jordã Lima Rodrigues (born August 10, 1983, in Salvador), simply known as Jordã, is a Brazilian footballer who plays for URT as midfielder.

== Career statistics ==
As of 8 March 2017

Club	Season	League			State League		Cup		Conmebol		Other		Total	
Club	Season	Division	Apps	Goals	Apps	Goals	Apps	Goals	Apps	Goals	Apps	Goals	Apps	Goals
Grêmio Osasco	2009	Paulista A3	—		20	0	—		—		13 (Note: All appearance(s) in Copa Paulista)	0	33	0
Comercial–SP	2010	Paulista A3	—		22	0	—		—		10	0	32	0
Comercial–SP	2011	Paulista A2	—		21	0	—		—		20	1	41	1
Comercial–SP	2012	Paulista	—		14	1	—		—		7	0	21	1
Comercial–SP	Subtotal		—		57	1	—		—		37	1	94	2
Brasiliense	2012	Série C	6	0	—		—		—		—		6	0
Brasiliense	2013	Série C	—		3	0	—		—		—		3	0
Brasiliense	Subtotal		6	0	3	0	—		—		—		9	0
Linense	2013	Paulista	—		—		—		—		12	1	12	1
Votuporanguense	2014	Paulista A3	—		16	1	—		—		12	0	28	1
Uberlândia	2015	Mineiro Módulo II	—		13	0	—		—		—		13	0
Comercial–SP	2016	Paulista A3	—		15	0	—		—		15	0	30	0
URT	2017	Mineiro	—		5	0	0	0	—		—		5	0
Career total			6	0	129	2	0	0	0	0	89	2	224	4
