= Boquita (footballer) =

Brazilian footballer (born 1990)

Personal information
- Full name: Rafael Aparecido da Silva
- Date of birth: 7 April 1990 (age 36)
- Place of birth: São Paulo, Brazil
- Height: 1.79 m (5 ft 10 1/2 in)
- Position: Midfielder

Youth career
- 2004–2008: Corinthians

Senior career*
Years	Team	Apps	(Gls)
2009–2014	Corinthians	28	(4)
2011	→ Bahia (loan)	1	(0)
2011–2012	→ Portuguesa (loan)	48	(2)
2014	Atlético Sorocaba	8	(0)
2014	Vila Nova	3	(0)
2015	Marília	0	(0)
2015–2016	Portuguesa	3	(0)
2017	Brusque	0	(0)
2017–2018	CSA	22	(1)
2019	Brasil de Pelotas	0	(0)
2019	Marcílio Dias	0	(0)
2020	Taubaté	0	(0)
2021	Murici	4	(0)
2022	Juventus-SP	1	(0)

International career
2009	Brazil U20	11	(1)
- * Club domestic league appearances and goals as of 19:30, 25 May 2020 (UTC)

Rafael Aparecido da Silva (born 7 April 1990), commonly known as Boquita, is a Brazilian footballer who plays for Esporte Clube Taubaté as a midfielder.

== Honours ==
Corinthians

- Copa São Paulo de Juniores: 2009
- Campeonato Paulista: 2009
- Copa do Brasil: 2009

Portuguesa

- Campeonato Brasileiro Série B: 2011

CSA

- Campeonato Brasileiro Série C: 2017
