= Leandro Carvalho (footballer, born 1983) =

Brazilian footballer

Personal information
- Full name: Leandro Hercílio Carvalho da Silveira
- Date of birth: 30 September 1983 (age 43)
- Place of birth: Rio de Janeiro, Brazil
- Height: 1.79 m (5 ft 10 in)
- Position: Defensive midfielder

Team information
- Current team: Paduano

Youth career
- 2002–2003: Botafogo

Senior career*
Years	Team	Apps	(Gls)
2004–2006	Botafogo		
2007	Sertãozinho		
2007	Sport		
2008	Figueirense		
2009	Itumbiara		
2009	Atlético Goianiense		
2010	Itumbiara		
2011	Botafogo-SP		
2011–2012	Guarani		
2012	Botafogo-SP		
2012	Joinville		
2013–2015	São Caetano		
2016	Mirassol		
2016–2019	Madureira		
2019–2021	São Gonçalo-RJ		
2021–	Paduano		
2022	→ Imperio EC (loan)		
- * Club domestic league appearances and goals

Leandro Hercílio Carvalho da Silveira (born 30 September 1983), or simply Leandro Carvalho, is a footballer who plays as a defensive midfielder for Paduano.
