= Grêmio Catanduvense de Futebol =

- Full name: Grêmio Catanduvense
- Founded: April 16, 2004; 22 years ago
- Ground: Estádio Municipal Silvio Salles, Catanduva, São Paulo state, Brazil
- Capacity: 16,474
- President: Reginaldo Marcelo Borges
- Head coach: Jorge Saran
- 2019: 2ª Divisão, 16th
- Website: https://web.archive.org/web/20110219222459/http://www.gremiocatanduvense.com.br/
Home colors	Away colors

Grêmio Catanduvense de Futebol, commonly known as Grêmio Catanduvense, is a currently inactive Brazilian football club based in Catanduva, São Paulo state.

== History ==
The club was founded on March 8, 1999. They finished as the Campeonato Paulista Segunda Divisão runners-up in 2006.

== Stadium ==
Grêmio Catanduvense de Futebol play their home games at Estádio Municipal Silvo Salles. The stadium has a maximum capacity of 16,474 people.
