= Clube Atlético Linense =

Linense
- Full name: Clube Atlético Linense
- Nickname: Elefante da Noroeste (Northwestern Elephant)
- Founded: 12 June 1927; 99 years ago
- Ground: Gilbertão
- Capacity: 15,770
- President: José Hugo Gentil Moreira
- Head coach: Xandão
- League: Campeonato Paulista Série A2
- 2025: Paulista Série A2, 12th of 16
Home colors	Away colors	Third colors

Clube Atlético Linense, commonly referred to as Linense, is a Brazilian professional association football club based in Lins, São Paulo. The team competes in the Campeonato Paulista Série A2, the second tier of the São Paulo state football league.

Founded on June 12, 1927, it was reorganized on February 11, 1930. Their colors are red, white and black. They won the Campeonato Paulista Second Division in 1952, and the Série A-2 (Second Division) in 2010, returning to the First Division in 2011, what has not happened since 1957.

The club is associated with several notable figures and events in Brazilian football history. It was one of the clubs involved in the early career of Leivinha, who later played for Portuguesa, Palmeiras, the Brazil national team and Atlético Madrid.The club was also involved in the international transfer of Brazilian striker Americo Murolo to Italy.. The club has a distinctive mascot associated with its history and local identity. Among the traditions associated with the club are celebrations involving elephants: following its victory in the second division in 1952, circus elephants were paraded at the club's grounds. A similar event took place in 2000 at Estádio Gilberto Siqueira Lopes.

The club announced the launch of a professional basketball team, which will begin playing in the second tier division of São Paulo state basketball. In January 2015, it is also expected that Clube Atlético Linense will join Liga Ouro, the second division of Brazil's national basketball league known as NBB.

== Honours ==
- Copa Paulista
  - Winners (1): 2015
- Campeonato Paulista Série A2
  - Winners (2): 1952, 2010
- Campeonato Paulista Série A3
  - Winners (1): 2021
