= 2011 Santos FC season =

Santos
2011 season
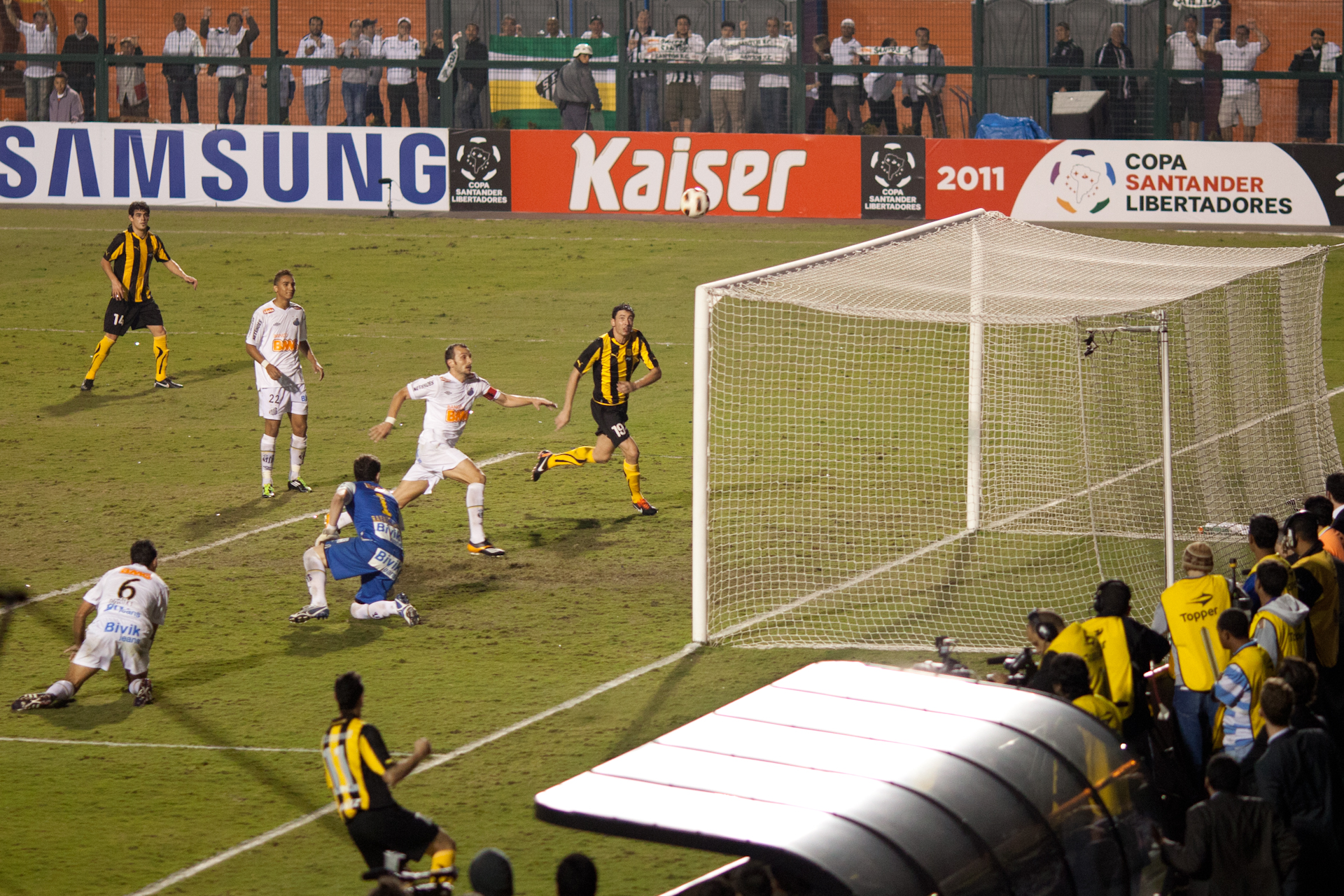
- Santos vs Peñarol in the second leg of the 2011 Copa Libertadores finals on 22 June
- President: Luis Álvaro de Oliveira Ribeiro
- Coach: Adílson Batista (until 27 February); Muricy Ramalho (from 5 April)
- Stadium: Vila Belmiro
- Campeonato Brasileiro: 10th
- Campeonato Paulista: Winners
- Copa Libertadores: Winners
- FIFA Club World Cup: Runners-up
- Top goalscorer: League: Borges (23); All: Borges; Neymar (24)
- Highest home attendance: 37,984 vs Peñarol (22 June)
- Lowest home attendance: 3,477 vs Grêmio (16 October)
Home colours	Away colours

The 2011 season was Santos Futebol Clube's ninety-ninth season in existence and the club's fifty-second consecutive season in the top flight of Brazilian football.

On 8 November 2010, Santos announced Adílson Batista to coach the team and his debut was on January in the Campeonato Paulista. But, on 27 February 2011, Santos sacked him although he had only one defeat in 11 matches. Marcelo Martelotte assumed as caretaker until 5 April when Muricy Ramalho was officially announced as new coach.

On 15 May, Santos won their 19th Campeonato Paulista title beating their rival Corinthians 2–1 on aggregate in the final. Santos also won their 3rd Copa Libertadores title, beating Uruguay's Peñarol 2–1 on aggregate after the first leg had ended scoreless in Montevideo. As they won the Copa Libertadores, they played the 2011 FIFA Club World Cup but lost 4–0 in the final to Spanish's Barcelona.

== Players ==
=== Squad information ===
Name	Nationality	Position	Since	Date of Birth (Age)	Signed from
Rafael	(Brazil)	GK	2009	20 May 1990 (age 36)	(Brazil) Youth team
Vladimir	(Brazil)	GK	2009	16 July 1989 (age 37)	(Brazil) Youth team
Aranha	(Brazil)	GK	2011	17 November 1980 (age 45)	(Brazil) Atlético Mineiro
Alex Sandro	(Brazil)	DF	2010	26 January 1991 (age 35)	(Brazil) Atlético–PR
Bruno Aguiar	(Brazil)	DF	2010	24 February 1981 (age 45)	(Brazil) Guarani
Bruno Rodrigo	(Brazil)	DF	2010	12 April 1985 (age 41)	(Brazil) Portuguesa
Crystian	(Brazil)	DF	2011	10 June 1992 (age 34)	(Brazil) Youth team
Danilo	(Brazil)	DF	2010	15 July 1991 (age 35)	(Brazil) América–MG
Durval	(Brazil)	DF	2010	11 July 1980 (age 46)	(Brazil) Sport
Éder Lima	(Brazil)	DF	2011	5 February 1986 (age 40)	(Brazil) Vila Nova
Edu Dracena	(Brazil)	DF	2009	18 May 1981 (age 45)	(Turkey) Fenerbahçe
Leandro Silva	(Brazil)	DF	2011	22 September 1988 (age 38)	(Brazil) Atlético Sorocaba
Léo	(Brazil)	DF	2009	6 July 1975 (age 51)	(Portugal) Benfica
Pará	(Brazil)	DF	2008	14 February 1985 (age 41)	(Brazil) Santo André
Vinicius Simon	(Brazil)	DF	2007	17 November 1986 (age 39)	(Brazil) Youth team
Adriano	(Brazil)	MF	2006	29 May 1987 (age 39)	(Brazil) Youth team
Anderson Carvalho	(Brazil)	MF	2011	20 May 1990 (age 36)	(Brazil) Youth team
Arouca	(Brazil)	MF	2010	11 August 1986 (age 40)	(Brazil) São Paulo
Elano	(Brazil)	MF	2011	14 June 1981 (age 45)	(Turkey) Galatasaray
Ganso	(Brazil)	MF	2008	12 October 1989 (age 37)	(Brazil) Youth team
Felipe Anderson	(Brazil)	MF	2010	15 April 1993 (age 33)	(Brazil) Youth team
Henrique	(Brazil)	MF	2011	16 May 1986 (age 40)	(Brazil) Cruzeiro
Ibson	(Brazil)	MF	2011	7 November 1983 (age 43)	(Russia) Spartak Moscow
Rodrigo Possebon	(Brazil)	MF	2010	13 February 1989 (age 37)	(England) Manchester United
Alan Kardec	(Brazil)	FW	2011	12 January 1989 (age 37)	(Portugal) Benfica
Borges	(Brazil)	FW	2011	5 October 1980 (age 46)	(Brazil) Grêmio
Diogo	(Brazil)	FW	2011	26 May 1987 (age 39)	(Greece) Olympiacos
Dimba	(Brazil)	FW	2010	22 February 1992 (age 34)	(Brazil) Youth team
Neymar	(Brazil)	FW	2009	5 February 1992 (age 34)	(Brazil) Youth team
Rentería	(Colombia)	FW	2011	4 July 1985 (age 41)	(Brazil) Caxias
Tiago Alves	(Brazil)	FW	2011	12 February 1993 (age 33)	(Brazil) Youth team

=== Appearances and goals ===
				Total			Campeonato Brasileiro		Campeonato Paulista		Copa Libertadores		FIFA Club World Cup	
No.	Pos.	Nat.	Name	Sts	App	Gls	App	Gls	App	Gls	App	Gls	App	Gls
	GK	(Brazil)	Aranha	5	6		5		1					
	GK	(Brazil)	Rafael	68	68		32		20		14		2	
	GK	(Brazil)	Vladimir	2	5		2		3					
	DF	(Brazil)	Alex Sandro	12	24		7		6		11			
	DF	(Brazil)	Bruno Aguiar	11	29	2	18	2	5		5		1	
	DF	(Brazil)	Bruno Rodrigo	23	27		17		7		1		2	
	DF	(Brazil)	Crystian	2	8		6		2					
	DF	(Brazil)	Danilo	52	52	6	23	1	13		14	4	2	1
	DF	(Brazil)	Durval	66	66		31		19		14		2	
	DF	(Brazil)	Éder Lima	5	6		6							
	DF	(Brazil)	Edu Dracena	61	61	3	27	1	19	1	13	1	2	
	DF	(Brazil)	Leandro Silva	3	4		4							
	DF	(Brazil)	Léo	48	50	2	22	1	15	1	12		1	
	DF	(Brazil)	Jonathan	20	20	2			13	1	7	1		
	DF	(Brazil)	Pará	35	48		20		18		10			
	DF	(Brazil)	Rafael Caldeira	1	1		1							
	DF	(Brazil)	Vinicius Simon	8	9		7		2					
	DF	(Brazil)	Walace Novais^{YS}		1		1							
	DF	(Brazil)	Wesley Santos^{YS}	1	1		1							
	MF	(Brazil)	Adriano	43	54		20		20		14			
	MF	(Brazil)	Alan Patrick	6	14	2	2		7	1	5	1		
	MF	(Brazil)	Alison	1	1		1							
	MF	(Brazil)	Anderson Carvalho	4	7		5		2					
	MF	(Brazil)	Arouca	42	43	1	27		4	1	10		2	
	MF	(Brazil)	Charles	3	5		4		1					
	MF	(Brazil)	Elano	40	43	15	12	1	17	11	12	3	2	
	MF	(Brazil)	Ganso	29	31	5	13	2	9	2	7	1	2	
	MF	(Brazil)	Felipe Anderson	12	29	2	18	1	10	1	1			
	MF	(Brazil)	Henrique	24	25	1	23	1					2	
	MF	(Brazil)	Ibson	14	21		19						2	
	MF	(Brazil)	Moisés		4				4					
	MF	(Brazil)	Robson	9	11				11					
	FW	(Brazil)	Renan Mota^{YS}		1		1							
	MF	(Brazil)	Rodrigo Possebon	18	29	1	8		16	1	5			
	MF	(Brazil)	Rodriguinho		2				2					
	MF	(Brazil)	Roger Gaúcho	4	9		9							
	MF	(Brazil)	Rychely	5	7	2	7	2						
	FW	(Brazil)	Alan Kardec	16	29	2	27	2					2	
	FW	(Brazil)	Borges	34	33	24	31	23					2	1
	FW	(Brazil)	Dimba		1				1					
	FW	(Brazil)	Diogo	15	20	1	11	1	6		3			
	FW	(Brazil)	Keirrison	12	20	7	2	1	14	6	4			
	FW	(Brazil)	Maikon Leite	10	21	8	1		14	7	6	1		
	FW	(Brazil)	Neymar	47	47	24	21	13	11	4	13	6	2	1
	FW	(Colombia)	Rentería	3	8	1	8	1						
	FW	(Brazil)	Tiago Alves	4	11	1	8		3	1				
	FW	(Brazil)	Zé Eduardo	28	30	8	1		16	7	13	1		

Last updated: 18 December 2011
Source: Match reports in competitive matches
Ordered by start team
0 shown as blank

YS= Youth system player with first team experience.

=== Top scorers ===
R	Name	Brasileirão	Libertadores	Paulistão	Club World Cup	Total
1	(Brazil) Borges	23	0	0	1	24
1	(Brazil) Neymar	13	6	4	1	24
2	(Brazil) Elano	1	3	11	0	15
3	(Brazil) Maikon Leite	0	1	7	0	8
3	(Brazil) Zé Eduardo	0	1	7	0	8
4	(Brazil) Keirrison	1	0	6	0	7
5	(Brazil) Danilo	1	4	0	1	6
6	(Brazil) Ganso	2	1	2	0	5

=== Disciplinary record ===
N	P	Nat.	Name	Campeonato Paulista			Copa Libertadores			Campeonato Brasileiro			FIFA Club World Cup			Total			Notes
N	P	Nat.	Name	Yellow card	Second yellow card	Red card	Yellow card	Second yellow card	Red card	Yellow card	Second yellow card	Red card	Yellow card	Second yellow card	Red card	Yellow card	Second yellow card	Red card	Notes
	MF	(Brazil)	Adriano	4			1			6						11			
	DF	(Brazil)	Alex Sandro				1			1						2			
	MF	(Brazil)	Anderson Carvalho							1						1			
	GK	(Brazil)	Aranha							1						1			
	MF	(Brazil)	Arouca	2			4			4						10			
	FW	(Brazil)	Borges							3						3			
	DF	(Brazil)	Bruno Aguiar							3						3			
	DF	(Brazil)	Bruno Rodrigo							5						5			
	MF	(Brazil)	Charles							1						1			
	DF	(Brazil)	Cristyan							2	1					2	1		
	MF	(Brazil)	Danilo	6			2			5						13			
	FW	(Brazil)	Diogo	2						1						3			
	DF	(Brazil)	Durval	4						3						7			
	DF	(Brazil)	Éder Lima							1						1			
	DF	(Brazil)	Edu Dracena	3			3		1	8		1	1			15		2	
	MF	(Brazil)	Elano	7			3		1	4						14		1	
	MF	(Brazil)	Felipe Anderson	1						1						2			
	MF	(Brazil)	Ganso	4						2			1			7			
	MF	(Brazil)	Henrique							3	1		1			4	1		
	MF	(Brazil)	Ibson							4						4			
	DF	(Brazil)	Jonathan				1									1			
	DF	(Brazil)	Leandro Silva							2						2			
	DF	(Brazil)	Léo	3			2			8						13			
	MF	(Brazil)	Moisés	1												1			
	FW	(Brazil)	Neymar	4			5	1		10	1					19	2		
	DF	(Brazil)	Pará	4			1			3	1					8	1		
	GK	(Brazil)	Rafael			1	4			1						5		1	
	MF	(Brazil)	Robinho	3												3			
	MF	(Brazil)	Rodrigo Possebon	6			2			1						9			
	MF	(Brazil)	Rodriguinho	1												1			
	MF	(Brazil)	Roger							1						1			
	MF	(Brazil)	Rychely							1						1			
	DF	(Brazil)	Vinicius Simon	1						3	1					4	1		
	GK	(Brazil)	Vladimir	1												1			
	DF	(Brazil)	Walace Novais							1						1			
	FW	(Brazil)	Zé Eduardo	4			3		1							7		1	

Last updated: 18 December 2011
Source: Campeonato Paulista, Campeonato Brasileiro, Copa Libertadores
Ordered by (red card) , (second yellow card) and (yellow card)
(yellow card) = Number of bookings; (second yellow card) = Number of sending offs after a second yellow card; (red card) = Number of sending offs by a direct red card.

=== Copa Libertadores squad ===
As of 13 February 2011, according to combined sources on the official website.

In Conmebol competitions players must be assigned numbers between 1 and 25.

Note: Flags indicate national team as defined under FIFA eligibility rules; some limited exceptions apply. Players may hold more than one non-FIFA nationality.

No.	Pos.	Nation	Player
1	GK	BRA	Rafael
2	DF	BRA	Edu Dracena
3	DF	BRA	Léo
4	DF	BRA	Jonathan
5	MF	BRA	Arouca
6	DF	BRA	Durval
7	MF	BRA	Charles
8	MF	BRA	Elano
9	FW	BRA	Keirrison
10	MF	BRA	Ganso
11	FW	BRA	Neymar
12	GK	BRA	Aranha
13	DF	BRA	Bruno Aguiar
14	DF	BRA	Bruno Rodrigo

No.	Pos.	Nation	Player
15	MF	BRA	Adriano
16	DF	BRA	Alex Sandro
17	FW	BRA	Maikon Leite
18	MF	BRA	Rodrigo Possebon
19	FW	BRA	Diogo
20	FW	BRA	Zé Eduardo
21	DF	BRA	Pará
22	DF	BRA	Danilo
23	MF	BRA	Robson
24	GK	BRA	Vladimir
25	MF	BRA	Alan Patrick

=== FIFA Club World Cup squad ===
Note: Flags indicate national team as defined under FIFA eligibility rules; some limited exceptions apply. Players may hold more than one non-FIFA nationality.

No.	Pos.	Nation	Player
1	GK	BRA	Rafael
2	DF	BRA	Edu Dracena
3	DF	BRA	Léo
4	DF	BRA	Danilo
5	MF	BRA	Arouca
6	DF	BRA	Durval
7	MF	BRA	Henrique
8	MF	BRA	Elano
9	FW	BRA	Borges
10	MF	BRA	Ganso
11	FW	BRA	Neymar
12	GK	BRA	Aranha
13	DF	BRA	Bruno Aguiar
14	DF	BRA	Bruno Rodrigo

No.	Pos.	Nation	Player
15	MF	BRA	Anderson Carvalho
16	DF	BRA	Vinicius Simon
17	FW	BRA	Felipe Anderson
18	MF	BRA	Ibson
19	FW	BRA	Alan Kardec
20	FW	COL	Rentería
21	DF	BRA	Pará
22	DF	BRA	Diogo
23	MF	BRA	Vladimir

== Club ==
=== Coaching staff ===
Position	Staff
Coach	Muricy Ramalho
Assistant coach	Cláudio Grillo; Edinho; Marcelo Fernandes; Tata
Fitness trainer	Ricardo Rosa; Fernando Fernandez; Marco Alejandro
Goalkeeping coach	Oscar Rodriguez; Arzul

Source: Santos FC

=== Kits ===
This season was Santos' last season in which Umbro manufactured their kit. On 2 February, Santos released the kit for Copa Libertadores. On 5 June, Santos released a specific kit to use on Campeonato Brasileiro.

Home	Away	International Home	International Away

== Transfers ==
=== In ===
P	Nat.	Name	Age	Moving from	Type	Source
MF	(Brazil)	Elano	29	Galatasaray (Turkey)	Signed	Estadão
MF	(Brazil)	Charles	26	Lokomotiv Moscow (Russia)	Loaned	Placar
GK	(Brazil)	Aranha	30	Atlético Mineiro	Signed	Globo Esporte
DF	(Brazil)	Jonathan	25	Cruzeiro	Signed	Globo Esporte
MF	(Brazil)	Robson	23	Avaí	Loan Return	
FW	(Brazil)	Maikon Leite	22	Atlético–PR	Loan Return	Lancenet
FW	(Brazil)	Diogo	23	style="text-align:left;"Olympiacos (Greece)	Loaned	SantosFC.com.br
FW	(Brazil)	Rychely	23	Santo André	Loaned	Globo Esporte
DF	(Brazil)	Rafael Caldeira	20	Oeste	Loan return	
MF	(Brazil)	Roger	25	Oeste	Loaned	Lancenet
FW	(Brazil)	Borges	30	Grêmio	Signed	UOL
FW	(Brazil)	Alan Kardec	22	Benfica (Portugal)	Loaned	Globo Esporte
DF	(Brazil)	Leandro Silva	23	Atlético Sorocaba	Loaned	IG
MF	(Brazil)	Henrique	26	Cruzeiro	Signed	Globo Esporte
MF	(Brazil)	Ibson	27	Spartak Moscow (Russia)	Signed	Globo Esporte
MF	(Venezuela)	Breitner	21	Figueirense	Loan Return	ESPBR
DF	(Brazil)	Éder Lima	25	Oeste	Signed	Globo Esporte
FW	(Colombia)	Rentería	25	Caxias	Loaned	Globo Esporte
MF	(Venezuela)	Breitner	21	Criciúma	Loan Return	Futebol Futebol

=== Out ===
P	Nat.	Name	Age	Moving to	Type	Source
FW	(Brazil)	Marcel	29	Benfica (Portugal)	Loan Expiration	Lancenet
GK	(Brazil)	Douglas	27	Vitória de Guimarães (Portugal)	End of contract	O Gol
MF	(Brazil)	Roberto Brum	32	Free agent	Contract Terminated	UOL Esporte
MF	(Brazil)	Zezinho	18	Bahia	Contract Terminated	Folha
MF	(Brazil)	Rodriguinho	29	Neftchi (Azerbaijan)	Transferred	Folha
MF	(Brazil)	Robson	23	Avaí	Contract Terminated	Terra Esporte
MF	(Brazil)	Victor Hugo	19	Free agent	Contract Terminated	SantosFC.com.br
MF	(Brazil)	Marquinhos	29	Grêmio	Swapped^{1}	Globo Esporte
MF	(Brazil)	Moisés	22	Naútico	Contract Terminated	Futebol Interior
MF	(Brazil)	Alan Patrick	20	Shakhtar Donetsk (Ukraine)	Transferred	Shakhtar.com
DF	(Brazil)	Jonathan	25	Internazionale (Italy)	Transferred	UOL Esporte
FW	(Brazil)	Zé Eduardo	23	Genoa (Italy)	Transferred	Terra Esporte
FW	(Brazil)	Maikon Leite	22	Palmeiras	End of contract	Globo Esporte
MF	(Brazil)	Charles	26	Cruzeiro	Contract Terminated	Globo Esporte
DF	(Brazil)	Alex Sandro	20	Porto (Portugal)	Transferred	Globo Esporte
FW	(Brazil)	Keirrison	22	Barcelona (Spain)	Loan Expiration	Placar
MF	(Brazil)	Roger Gaúcho	25	Oeste	Loan Expiration	Globo Esporte
FW	(Brazil)	Rychely	24	Vitória	Contract Terminated	Globo Esporte
DF	(Brazil)	Éder Lima	25	Oeste	End of contract	Globo Esporte

- 1: Included in Borges transfer.

=== Out on loan ===
P	Nat.	Name	Age	moving to	Source
MF	(Venezuela)	Breitner	21	Figueirense	Globo Esporte
MF	(Brazil)	Madson	24	Atlético–PR	Globo Esporte
MF	(Brazil)	Marquinhos	29	Avaí	R7 Esporte
DF	(Brazil)	Maranhão	25	Coritiba	Terra Esporte
DF	(Brazil)	Domingos	25	São Caetano	UOL Esporte
DF	(Brazil)	Rafael Caldeira	19	Oeste	SantosFC.com.br
MF	(Brazil)	Rodrigo Mancha	24	Botafogo	Lancenet
GK	(Brazil)	Felipe	23	Avaí	Globo Esporte
FW	(Brazil)	Tiago Luis	20	Ponte Preta	Lancenet
MF	(Brazil)	Alan Santos	20	Paulista	Futebol Interior
MF	(Brazil)	Rodrigo Mancha	25	Vitória	Terra Esporte
MF	(Venezuela)	Breitner	21	Criciúma	Terra Esporte
DF	(Brazil)	Rafael Caldeira	20	ABC	IG Esporte

== Competitions ==
=== Overview ===
Competition	First match	Last match	Starting round	Final position	Record							
Competition	First match	Last match	Starting round	Final position	Pld	W	D	L	GF	GA	GD	Win %
Série A	21 May 2011	4 December 2011	Matchday 1	10th	38	15	8	15	55	55	+0	39.47
Campeonato Paulista	15 January 2011	15 May 2011	Matchday 1	Winners	23	14	6	3	45	21	+24	60.87
Copa Libertadores	15 February 2011	22 June 2011	Group stage	Winners	14	7	6	1	20	13	+7	50.00
FIFA Club World Cup	14 December 2011	18 December 2011	Semifinal	Runners-up	2	1	0	1	3	5	−2	50.00
Total					77	37	20	20	123	94	+29	48.05

Source: Competitions

=== Detailed overall summary ===
	Total	Home	Away
Games played	77	39	38
Games won	37	24	13
Games drawn	20	9	11
Games lost	20	6	14
Biggest win	4–1 v Atlético–PR; 4–1 v Linense	4–1 v Atlético–PR	4–1 v Linense
Biggest loss	0–4 v Barcelona	0–4 v Barcelona	1–4 São Paulo
Clean sheets	23	15	8
Goals scored	123	68	55
Goals conceded	94	38	56
Goal difference	+29	+30	-1
Average GF per game	1.6	1.74	1.45
Average GA per game	1.22	0.97	1.47
Most appearances	Rafael (68)	Rafael (37)	Rafael and Durval (31)
Top scorer	Neymar and Borges (24)	Neymar (17)	Elano and Borges (9)
Worst discipline	Neymar (yellow card) (19) (red card) (2)	Neymar and Elano; (yellow card) (9) (red card) (1)	Neymar and Edu; Dracena (yellow card) (10) (red card) (1)
Points	131/231 (56.71%)	81/117 (69.23%)	50/114 (43.86%)
Winning rate	(48.05%)	(61.54%)	(34.21%)

Last updated: 18 December 2011
Source: Competitive matches

=== FIFA Club World Cup ===
14 December Semi-final	Kashiwa Reysol (Japan)	1–3	(Brazil) Santos	Toyota, Japan
19:30 UTC+09:00	Leandro Domingues (yellow card) 32'; Sakai 54'; Kurisawa (yellow card) 62'	Report	19' Neymar; 24' Borges; 63' Danilo; (yellow card) 72' Henrique	Stadium: Toyota Stadium; Attendance: 29,173; Referee: Nicola Rizzoli (Italy)

18 December Final	Santos (Brazil)	0–4	(Spain) Barcelona	Yokohama, Japan
19:30 UTC+09:00	Ganso (yellow card) 73'; Edu Dracena (yellow card) 74'	Report	17', 82' Messi; 24' Xavi; (yellow card) 39' Pique; 45' Fabregas; (yellow card) 71' Mascherano	Stadium: International Stadium Yokohama; Attendance: 68,166; Referee: Ravshan Irmatov (Uzbekistan)

=== Campeonato Brasileiro ===
==== League table ====
Pos	Team	Pld	W	D	L	GF	GA	GD	Pts	Qualification or relegation
8	Coritiba	38	16	9	13	57	41	+16	57	2012 Copa Sudamericana Second Stage
9	Botafogo	38	16	8	14	52	49	+3	56	2012 Copa Sudamericana Second Stage
10	Santos	38	15	8	15	55	55	0	53	2012 Copa Libertadores Second Stage (Note: Santos is qualified for the second stage of the 2012 Copa Libertadores as the 2011 Copa Libertadores champion.)
11	Palmeiras	38	11	17	10	43	39	+4	50	2012 Copa Sudamericana Second Stage
12	Grêmio	38	13	9	16	49	57	−8	48	2012 Copa Sudamericana Second Stage

Rules for classification: 1st points; 2nd wins; 3rd goal difference; 4th goals scored; 5th head-to-head results; 6th least red cards received; 7th least yellow cards received; 8th draw

==== Results summary ====
Overall								Home						Away					
Pld	W	D	L	GF	GA	GD	Pts	W	D	L	GF	GA	GD	W	D	L	GF	GA	GD
38	15	8	15	55	55	0	53	10	5	4	31	20	+11	5	3	11	24	35	−11

Last updated: 4 December 2011.
Source: Competitive matches

==== Results by match ====
Round	1	2	3	4	5	6	7	8	9	10	11	12	13	14	15	16	17	18	19	20	21	22	23	24	25	26	27	28	29	30	31	32	33	34	35	36	37	38
Ground	H	A	H	A	H	H	A	H	A	H	A	H	A	A	H	A	H	A	H	A	H	A	H	A	A	H	A	H	A	H	A	H	H	A	H	A	H	A
Result	D	L	W	D	D	W	L	W	L	W	L	L	L	L	W	L	L	W	D	D	W	W	W	W	W	L	L	W	L	L	D	W	W	W	D	L	D	L
Position	10	15	11	13	13	10	11	10	11	9	13	13	14	14	12	15	16	14	15	15	15	13	11	8	6	9	10	8	8	11	10	10	9	8	9	10	10	10

Updated to match(es) played on 4 December 2011. Source: Futpédia
A = Away; H = Home; W = Win; D = Draw; L = Loss

==== Matches ====
21 May 1	Santos	1–1	Internacional	Santos
21:00 UTC−03:00	Charles (yellow card) 17'; Keirrison 28' (pen.); Bruno Aguiar (yellow card) 76'	Report	(yellow card) 26' Bolatii; (yellow card) 27' Daniel; 34' Zé Roberto	Stadium: Vila Belmiro; Attendance: 4,532; Referee: Sandro Meira Ricci

28 May 2	Botafogo	1–0	Santos	Rio de Janeiro
18:30 UTC−03:00	Fábio Ferreira 36'; Thiago Galhardo (yellow card) 83'	Report	(yellow card) 41' Alex Sandro; (yellow card) 43' Bruno Rodrigo; (yellow card) 84' Vinicius Simon	Stadium: Engenhão; Attendance: 8,662; Referee: Heber Roberto Lopes

5 June 3	Santos	3–1	Avaí	Santos
18:30 UTC−03:00	Borges 9' 53'; Roger Gaúcho (yellow card) 63'; Rychely 90+3'	Report	(yellow card) 34' Gustavo Bastos; (yellow card) 55' Fabiano; (yellow card) 71' Marcinho Guerreiro; 90' Maurício Alves; (yellow card) 90+5' Julinho	Stadium: Vila Belmiro; Attendance: 4,109; Referee: Jose de Caldas Souza

11 June 4	Cruzeiro	1–1	Santos	Sete Lagoas
18:30 UTC−03:00	Montillo 55' (pen.); Henrique (yellow card) 76'; Pablo (yellow card) 89'; Dudu (yellow card) 90+2'	Report	(red card) 49' Vinicius Simon; (yellow card) 53' Walace; 90' Borges; (yellow card) 90+1' Rychely	Stadium: Arena do Jacaré; Attendance: 6,073; Referee: Marcelo de Lima Henrique

10 August 5	Santos	0–0	Corinthians	Santos
19:30 UTC−03:00	Elano (yellow card) 73'; Edu Dracena (yellow card) 90+1'	Report		Stadium: Vila Belmiro; Attendance: 9,714; Referee: Luis Flávio de Oliveira

2 July 6	Santos	1–0	América–MG	São Paulo
18:30 UTC−03:00	Anderson 7' (o.g.); Bruno Rodrigo (yellow card) 90'	Report	(yellow card) 37' Willian Rocha; (yellow card) 42' Marcos Rocha	Stadium: Pacaembu; Attendance: 5,912; Referee: Wilton Pereira Sampaio

29 June 7	Figueirense	2–1	Santos	Florianópolis
21:50 UTC−03:00	Aloísio 5', 32', (yellow card) 84'; Édson (yellow card) 42'	Report	6' Rychely; (yellow card) 83' Edu Dracena	Stadium: Orlando Scarpelli; Attendance: 5,322; Referee: Márcio Chagas da Silva

24 August 8	Santos	2–1	Fluminense	Santos
20:30 UTC−03:00	Borges 13', 41'; Arouca (yellow card) 7'; Danilo (yellow card) 25'; Elano (yellow card) 62'; Ganso (yellow card) 72'	Report	(yellow card) 15' Marquinho; (yellow card) 32' Digão; 38' (yellow card) 80' Rafael Moura; (yellow card) 43' Edinho; (yellow card) 79' Diogo	Stadium: Vila Belmiro; Attendance: 6,855; Referee: Paulo Henrique de Godoy Bezerra

10 July 9	Palmeiras	3–0	Santos	São Paulo
18:30 UTC−03:00	Maikon 21'; Ramos 29'; Patrik 45'; João Vitor (yellow card) 90'	Report	(yellow card) 51' Léo; (yellow card) 90' Pará	Stadium: Pacaembu; Attendance: 16,751; Referee: Luis Flávio de Oliveira

16 July 10	Santos	2–1	Atlético Mineiro	Santos
21:00 UTC−03:00	Danilo (yellow card) 16' (goal) 23'; Bruno Rodrigo (yellow card) 25'; Borges 41' (pen.) (yellow card) 88'	Report	26' Jônatas Obina; (yellow card) 27' Toró; (yellow card) 37' Caio; (yellow card) 40' Réver; (yellow card) 90' Neto Berola	Stadium: Vila Belmiro; Attendance: 4,717; Referee: Arilson Bispo da Anunciação

5 October 11	Grêmio	1–0	Santos	Porto Alegre
20:30 UTC−03:00	Brandão 9'; Júlio César (yellow card) 12'; Escudero (yellow card) 56'; Douglas (yellow card) 65'	Report	(yellow card) 19' Borges; (yellow card) 20' Ibson; (yellow card) 28' Léo; (yellow card) 44' Danilo; (yellow card) 53' Arouca; (yellow card) 79' Edu Dracena	Stadium: Olímpico; Attendance: 21,102; Referee: Pablo dos Santos Alves

27 July 12	Santos	4–5	Flamengo	Santos
21:50 UTC−03:00	Borges 5', 16'; Neymar 26', 51', (yellow card) 90'	Report	28', 68', 81' Ronaldinho; (yellow card) 30' Welinton; 32' (yellow card) 64' Thiago Neves; (yellow card) 41' Willians; 44' Deivid; (yellow card) 74' Renato Abreu; (yellow card) 79' Bottinelli	Stadium: Vila Belmiro; Attendance: 12,968; Referee: André Luiz de Freitas Castro

31 July 13	Atlético–PR	3–2	Santos	Curitiba
18:30 UTC−03:00	Cléber Santana 5'; Manoel 9'; Edílson (yellow card) 53'; Rodriguinho (yellow card) 72'; Marcinho 90'	Report	13' (yellow card) 61' Neymar; (yellow card) 16' Ibson; (yellow card) 36' Elano; 63' Borges; (yellow card) 81' Durval	Stadium: Arena da Baixada; Attendance: 18,898; Referee: Marcelo de Lima Henrique

3 August 14	Vasco	2–0	Santos	Rio de Janeiro
21:50 UTC−03:00	Diego Souza 2'; Dedé 19'; Rômulo (yellow card) 52'; Felipe (yellow card) 53'; Diego Rosa (yellow card) 59'	Report	(yellow card) 27' Edu Dracena; (yellow card) 43' Neymar; (yellow card) 74' Léo	Stadium: São Januário; Attendance: 17,118; Referee: Héber Roberto Lopes

7 August 15	Santos	1–0	Ceará	São Paulo
16:00 UTC−03:00	Leandro Silva (yellow card) 17'; Henrique (yellow card) 22'; Borges 32'; Elano (yellow card) 87'	Report	(yellow card) 26' Rudnei; (yellow card) 37' Heleno; (yellow card) 57' Fabrício	Stadium: Pacaembu; Attendance: 10,105; Referee: Fabrício Neves Corrêa

13 August 16	Atlético–GO	2–0	Santos	Goiânia
18:30 UTC−03:00	Agenor (yellow card) 36'; Anselmo 69'; Diogo Campos 79' (yellow card) 80'	Report	(yellow card) 30' Neymar	Stadium: Serra Dourada; Attendance: 11,668; Referee: Sandro Meira Ricci

17 August 17	Santos	2–3	Coritiba	Santos
21:50 UTC−03:00	Borges 4', 56'; Durval (yellow card) 33'; Arouca (yellow card) 67'; Pará (yellow card) 57' (yellow-red card) 75'; Neymar (yellow card) 85'; Felipe Anderson (yellow card) 86'; Edu Dracena (red card) 90+2'	Report	(yellow card) 24' Émerson; (yellow card) 29' (goal) 33' Jeci; (yellow card) 30' Bill; (yellow card) 57' Tcheco; (yellow card) 58' Rafinha; (yellow card) 58' Leandro Donizete; 65' Marcos Aurélio; (yellow card) 68' (goal) 87' Léo Gago; (yellow card) 69' Édson Bastos; (yellow card) 73' Leonardo; (yellow card) 81' Jonas	Stadium: Vila Belmiro; Attendance: 5,143; Referee: Antonio de Carvalho Schneider

21 August 18	Bahia	1–2	Santos	Salvador
18:00 UTC−03:00	Marcone (yellow card) 5'; Júnior 29'; Carlos Alberto (yellow card) 58'; Fahel (yellow card) 79'	Report	3' (pen.) Neymar; (yellow card) 18' Léo; (yellow card) 71' Adriano; 81' Alan Kardec	Stadium: Pituaçu; Attendance: 32,157; Referee: Ricardo Marques Ribeiro

28 August 19	Santos	1–1	São Paulo	Santos
16:00 UTC−03:00	Adriano (yellow card) 33'; Pará (yellow card) 68'; Ganso 80'	Report	(yellow card) 10' João Filipe; (red card) 27' Carlinhos Paraíba; 45' Lucas; (yellow card) 61' Piris	Stadium: Vila Belmiro; Attendance: 12,498; Referee: Wilson Luiz Seneme

31 August 20	Internacional	3–3	Santos	Porto Alegre
21:50 UTC−03:00	Bolívar 8' (yellow card) 65'; Leandro Damião 18' (yellow card) 25'; Elton (yellow card) 42'; Dellatorre (yellow card) 47'; Índio (yellow card) 63'; Oscar 71' (pen.); Nei (yellow card) 87'	Report	(yellow card) 2' Durval; (yellow card) 65' Léo; (yellow card) 70' Edu Dracena; 75', 87' Borges; 80' Alan Kardec	Stadium: Beira-Rio; Attendance: 14,701; Referee: Arilson Bispo da Anunciação

19 October 21	Santos	2–0	Botafogo	Santos
20:30 UTC−02:00	Adriano (yellow card) 14'; Neymar 15'; Borges 28' (yellow card) 38'; Danilo (yellow card) 31'; Arouca (yellow card) 78'	Report	(yellow card) 3' Bruno Tiago; (yellow card) 87' Léo; (yellow card) 90' Alessandro	Stadium: Vila Belmiro; Attendance: 5,770; Referee: Evandro Rogério Roman

7 September 22	Avaí	1–2	Santos	Florianópolis
16:00 UTC−03:00	William 33' (pen.), (yellow card) 39'; Lincoln (yellow card) 27'; Robinho (yellow card) 35'; Romano (yellow card) 72'	Report	(yellow card) 16' Elano; (yellow card) 31' Edu Dracena; (yellow card) 39' Danilo; (yellow card) 43' Adriano; (yellow card) 47' Bruno Rodrigo; 70' Borges; 77' Felipe Anderson	Stadium: Ressacada; Attendance: 5,630; Referee: Gutemberg de Paula Fonseca

10 September 23	Santos	1–0	Cruzeiro	Santos
18:00 UTC−03:00	Borges 13'; Anderson Carvalho (yellow card) 31'; Bruno Aguiar (yellow card) 65'	Report	(yellow card) 37' Leandro Guerreiro; (yellow card) 58' Roger; (yellow card) 65' Naldo; (yellow card) 9' (yellow-red card) 67' Léo; (red card) 90+1' Fabrício	Stadium: Vila Belmiro; Attendance: 9,637; Referee: Francisco Carlos Nascimento

18 September 24	Corinthians	1–3	Santos	São Paulo
16:00 UTC−03:00	Liédson 12'; Ralf (yellow card) 72'; Emerson (yellow card) 85'	Report	37' (yellow card) 58' (yellow-red card) 66' Henrique; 53' Borges; 80' (o.g.) Chicão	Stadium: Pacaembu; Attendance: 34,308; Referee: Wilson Luiz Seneme

21 September 25	América Mineiro	1–2	Santos	Uberlândia
20:30 UTC−03:00	Marcos Rocha (yellow card) 45'; Anderson (yellow card) 57'; Kempes 68'	Report	61' Borges; (yellow card) 77' Adriano; 79' Edu Dracena; (yellow card) 90+3' Neymar	Stadium: Parque do Sabiá; Attendance: 18,562; Referee: Jean Pierre Gonçalves Lima

24 September 26	Santos	2–3	Figueirense	Santos
18:00 UTC−03:00	Borges 24'; Léo 45+1' (yellow card) 83'	Report	45', 84' (pen.) Júlio César; 21' Wellington Nem; (yellow card) 31' Jean Deretti; (yellow card) 79' Édson Silva	Stadium: Vila Belmiro; Attendance: 7,059; Referee: Héber Roberto Lopes

1 October 27	Fluminense	3–2	Santos	Rio de Janeiro
18:00 UTC−03:00	Marquinho 39'; Deco (yellow card) 58'; Leandro Euzébio (yellow card) 66'; Rafael Sóbis 72'; Digão (red card) 82'; Márcio Rozário 90+5'	Report	(yellow card) 24' Éder Lima; 32' Neymar; 89' Rentería	Stadium: Engenhão; Attendance: 15,255; Referee: Evandro Rogério Roman

9 October 28	Santos	1–0	Palmeiras	Santos
16:00 UTC−03:00	Ibson (yellow card) 38'; Borges 75'	Report	(yellow card) 42' Pedro Carmona	Stadium: Vila Belmiro; Attendance: 7,373; Referee: Guilherme Ceretta de Lima

13 October 29	Atlético Mineiro	2–1	Santos	Sete Lagoas
20:30 UTC−03:00	Réver 6' (yellow card) 72'; Pierre (yellow card) 12'; Leonardo Silva (yellow card) 48'; Magno Alves 58' (pen.); Triguinho (yellow card) 63'; Bernard (yellow card) 64'	Report	49' (pen.) Borges; (yellow card) 57' Léo; (yellow card) 14' (yellow-red card) 57' Crystian; (yellow card) 84' (yellow-red card) 84' Neymar	Stadium: Arena do Jacaré; Attendance: 12,351; Referee: Wilton Pereira Sampaio

16 October 30	Santos	0–1	Grêmio	Santos
16:00 UTC−02:00	Rafael (yellow card) 19'; Edu Dracena (yellow card) 36'	Report	20' Escudero; (yellow card) 45' Fernando; (yellow card) 54' André Lima	Stadium: Vila Belmiro; Attendance: 3,477; Referee: Emerson de Almeida Ferreira

23 October 31	Flamengo	1–1	Santos	Rio de Janeiro
18:00 UTC−02:00	Negueba (yellow card) 11'; Willians (yellow card) 51'; Deivid 77'; Maldonado (yellow card) 82'	Report	48' (pen.) Neymar	Stadium: Engenhão; Attendance: 13,853; Referee: Paulo H. Godoy Bezerra

29 October 32	Santos	4–1	Atlético–PR	São Paulo
18:00 UTC−02:00	Neymar 2' (pen.), 54' (pen.), 56', 70', (yellow card) 32'	Report	(yellow card) 5' Cléber Santana; (yellow card) 41' Wagner Diniz; 51' (yellow card) 72' Paulo Baier; (yellow card) 90' Edílson	Stadium: Pacaembu; Attendance: 16,679; Referee: Francisco Carlos Nascimento

6 November 33	Santos	2–0	Vasco	Santos
16:00 UTC−02:00	Neymar 3'; Borges 74'	Report	(yellow card) 46' Diego Souza	Stadium: Vila Belmiro; Attendance: 12,305; Referee: André Luiz de Freitas Castro

13 November 34	Ceará	2–3	Santos	Fortaleza
16:00 UTC−02:00	Felipe Azevedo 24' (pen.); Osvaldo 35'; João Marcos (yellow card) 37'	Report	10', 50' (yellow card) 23' Bruno Aguiar; (yellow card) 57' (goal) 73' Diogo; (yellow card) 71' Ibson; (yellow card) 90+3' Aranha	Stadium: Presidente Vargas; Attendance: 15,406; Referee: Anderson Daronco

16 November 35	Santos	1–1	Atlético–GO	São Paulo
21:00 UTC−02:00	Edu Dracena (yellow card) 8'; Adriano (yellow card) 38'; Neymar (yellow card) 83'; Ganso 90+5'	Report	(yellow card) 12' Joílson; (yellow card) 30' (goal) 36' Leonardo; (yellow card) 18' (yellow-red card) 62' Agenor; (yellow card) 67' Dodô; (yellow card) 70' Anselmo; (yellow card) 75' Bida	Stadium: Pacaembu; Attendance: 18,044; Referee: Alício Pena Júnior

20 November 36	Coritiba	1–0	Santos	Curitiba
16:00 UTC−02:00	Leonardo 61'; Willian (yellow card) 76'	Report	(yellow card) 37' Leandro Silva; (yellow card) 69' Ibson; (yellow card) 81' Rodrigo Possebon	Stadium: Couto Pereira; Attendance: 16,447; Referee: Elmo Alves Resende Cunha

27 November 37	Santos	1–1	Bahia	Santos
16:00 UTC−02:00	Neymar 31'; Bruno Rodrigo (yellow card) 42'; Ganso (yellow card) 58'	Report	8' Souza; (yellow card) 43' Marcos; (yellow card) 55' Paulo Miranda; (yellow card) 65' Diones; (yellow card) 66' Ricardinho; (yellow card) 85' Fahel	Stadium: Vila Belmiro; Attendance: 12,052; Referee: Leandro Pedro Vuaden

4 December 38	São Paulo	4–1	Santos	Mogi Mirim
16:00 UTC−02:00	Luís Fabiano 13', 80'; Cícero 33'; Lucas 38'; Wellington (yellow card) 62'	Report	(yellow card) 46' Felipe Anderson; 61' Elano; (yellow card) 75' Bruno Aguiar	Stadium: Vail Chaves; Attendance: 4,948; Referee: Rodrigo Braghetto

=== Campeonato Paulista ===
==== Results summary ====
Overall								Home						Away					
Pld	W	D	L	GF	GA	GD	Pts	W	D	L	GF	GA	GD	W	D	L	GF	GA	GD
23	14	6	3	45	21	+24	48	9	2	1	25	8	+17	5	4	2	20	13	+7

Last updated: 15 May 2011.
Source: Competitive matches

==== First stage ====
===== League table =====
Pos	Team	Pld	W	D	L	GF	GA	GD	Pts	Qualification or relegation
2	Palmeiras	19	12	5	2	28	8	+20	41	Advanced to the Knockout stage
3	Corinthians	19	11	5	3	33	12	+21	38	Advanced to the Knockout stage
4	Santos	19	11	5	3	40	20	+20	38	Advanced to the Knockout stage
5	Ponte Preta	19	9	5	5	22	16	+6	32	Advanced to the Knockout stage
6	Oeste	19	9	4	6	25	17	+8	31	Advanced to the Knockout stage

Updated to match(es) played on 17 April 2011. Source: UOL Esporte
Rules for classification: 1st points; 2nd wins; 3rd goal difference; 4th goals scored; 5th red cards received; 6th yellow cards received; 7th public draw

===== Results by round =====
Round	1	2	3	4	5	6	7	8	9	10	11	12	13	14	15	16	17	18	19
Ground	A	H	A	H	H	A	A	H	A	H	A	H	H	A	H	A	H	A	H
Result	W	W	W	D	W	D	D	W	L	D	W	W	W	L	W	W	L	D	W
Position	1	1	1	1	1	2	2	2	5	5	4	3	3	4	4	4	4	4	4

W = Win; D = Draw; L = Loss

Last updated: 17 April 2011.
Source: Futpédia
Ground: A = Away; H = Home. Result: D = Draw; L = Lose; W = Win; P = Postponed.

===== Matches =====
15 January 1	Linense	1–4	Santos	Lins
19:30 UTC−02:00	Fausto 88'	Report	8', 67' Maikon Leite; 33' Zé Eduardo; 42' (pen.) Keirrison	Stadium: Gilberto Siqueira Lopes; Attendance: 4,875; Referee: Rodrigo Braghetto

19 January 2	Santos	3–0	Mirassol	São Paulo
19:30 UTC−02:00	Maikon Leite 27'; Zé Eduardo 47', 75'	Report		Stadium: Pacaembu; Attendance: 11,496; Referee: Marcelo Aparecido Ribeiro de Souza

23 January 3	Gremio Prudente	2–4	Santos	Presidente Prudente
17:00 UTC−02:00	Rômulo 71' (pen.); Bruno Ribeiro 81'	Report	13', 23' (pen.) Elano; 54' Keirrison; 61' Maikon Leite	Stadium: Prudentão; Attendance: 6,670; Referee: Luiz Flavio de Oliveira

26 January 4	Santos	3–3	São Caetano	Barueri
19:30 UTC−02:00	Elano 8' (pen.), 53'; Keirrison 48'	Report	37' Arthur; 44' Vandinho; 80' (o.g.) Durval	Stadium: Arena Barueri; Attendance: 6,765; Referee: Luiz Flavio de Oliveira

30 January 5	Santos	2–0	São Paulo	Barueri
17:00 UTC−02:00	Elano 10'; Maikon Leite 57'	Report		Stadium: Arena Barueri; Attendance: 9,334; Referee: Sálvio Spínola Fagundes Filho

2 February 6	Ponte Preta	2–2	Santos	Campinas
19:30 UTC−02:00	Romulo 23'; Renatinho 57' (pen.)	Report	40' Elano; 85' Maikon Leite	Stadium: Moisés Lucarelli; Attendance: 8,101; Referee: Luiz Flavio de Oliveira

5 February 7	Santo André	1–1	Santos	São Paulo
19:30 UTC−02:00	Marcelo Godri 5'	Report	44' Rodrigo Possebon	Stadium: Pacaembu; Attendance: 8,310; Referee: Aurélio Santanna Martins

11 February 8	Santos	2–0	Noroeste	Santos
21:00 UTC−02:00	Zé Eduardo 9'; Felipe Anderson 70'	Report		Stadium: Vila Belmiro; Attendance: 10,054; Referee: Leandro Bizzio Marinho

20 February 9	Corinthians	3–1	Santos	São Paulo
16:00 UTC−02:00	Fabio Santos 23', 61' (pen.); Liédson 86'	Report	41' Elano	Stadium: Pacaembu; Attendance: 19,448; Referee: Raphael Claus

26 February 10	Santos	1–1	São Bernardo	Santos
18:30 UTC-03:00	Elano 44' (pen.)	Report	68' Raul	Stadium: Vila Belmiro; Attendance: 8,945; Referee: Milton Etsuo Ballerini

5 March 11	Oeste	0–2	Santos	Itápolis
21:00 UTC-03:00		Report	44' (pen.), 70' Zé Eduardo	Stadium: Amaros; Attendance: 2,003; Referee: Jose Claudio Rocha Filho

9 March 12	Santos	3–0	Portuguesa	Santos
21:50 UTC-03:00	Neymar 41', 50'; Léo 68'	Report		Stadium: Vila Belmiro; Attendance: 7,843; Referee: Vinicius Furlan

12 March 13	Santos	2–1	Botafogo	Santos
18:30 UTC-03:00	Elano 46'; Ganso 55'	Report	88' Anselmo	Stadium: Vila Belmiro; Attendance: 12,134; Referee: Rodrigo Braghetto

19 March 14	Bragantino	2–1	Santos	Bragança Paulista
18:30 UTC-03:00	Léo Jaime 25'; Marcelinho 88'	Report	31' (pen.) Elano	Stadium: Estádio Nabi Abi Chedid; Attendance: 11,146; Referee: Leandro Bizzio Marinho

23 March 15	Santos	3–1	Mogi Mirim	Santos
19:30 UTC-03:00	Zé Eduardo 6'; Keirrison 49'; Edu Dracena 75'	Report	72' Cristiano	Stadium: Vila Belmiro; Attendance: 3,785; Referee: Antonio Rogério Batista do Prado

27 March 16	Ituano	2–3	Santos	Itu
18:30 UTC-03:00	Jefferson 24'; Allan 82'	Report	27' Tiago Alves; 34' Keirrison; 66' Jonathan	Stadium: Estádio Novelli Júnior; Attendance: 5,301; Referee: Philippe Lombard

3 April 17	Santos	0–1	Palmeiras	Santos
16:00 UTC-03:00		Report	79' Kléber	Stadium: Vila Belmiro; Attendance: 10,719; Referee: Vinicius Furlan

10 April 18	Americana	0–0	Santos	Americana
18:30 UTC-03:00		Report		Stadium: Estádio Décio Vitta; Attendance: 11,030; Referee: Aurélio Santanna Martins

17 April 19	Santos	3–0	Paulista	Santos
16:00 UTC-03:00	Keirrison 1'; Alan Patrick 2'; Maikon Leite 79'	Report		Stadium: Vila Belmiro; Attendance: 4,263; Referee: Luiz Vanderlei Martinucho

==== Knockout stage ====
===== Quarter-final =====
24 April	Santos	1–0	Ponte Preta	Santos
16:00 UTC-03:00	Neymar 20'	Report		Stadium: Vila Belmiro; Attendance: 12,225; Referee: Rodrigo Braghetto

===== Semi-final =====
30 April	São Paulo	0–2	Santos	São Paulo
16:00 UTC-03:00		Report	60' Elano; 72' Ganso	Stadium: Morumbi; Attendance: 44,675; Referee: Raphael Claus

===== Finals =====
8 May 1st Leg	Corinthians	0–0	Santos	São Paulo
16:00 UTC-03:00		Report		Stadium: Pacaembu; Attendance: 34,547; Referee: Cleber Wellington Abade

15 May 2nd Leg	Santos	2–1 (2–1 agg.)	Corinthians	Santos
16:00 UTC-03:00	Arouca 16'; Neymar 83'	Report	16' Morais	Stadium: Vila Belmiro; Attendance: 14,322; Referee: Luiz Flavio de Oliveira

=== Copa Libertadores ===
==== Group stage ====
Pos	Team	Pld	W	D	L	GF	GA	GD	Pts
1	(Paraguay) Cerro Porteño	6	3	2	1	13	8	+5	11
2	(Brazil) Santos	6	3	2	1	11	8	+3	11
3	(Chile) Colo-Colo	6	3	0	3	15	16	−1	9
4	(Venezuela) Deportivo Táchira	6	0	2	4	5	12	−7	2

15 February 1	Deportivo Táchira (Venezuela)	0–0	(Brazil) Santos	San Cristóbal, Colombia
22:45 UTC−02:00	Fernández (yellow card) 36'	Report	(yellow card) 15' Danilo; (yellow card) 62' Rodrigo Possebon	Stadium: Polideportivo Pueblo Nuevo; Referee: (Ecuador) Carlos Vera

2 March 2	Santos (Brazil)	1–1	(Paraguay) Cerro Porteño	Santos
21:55 UTC−03:00	Elano (yellow card) 8' (goal) 55' (pen.); Léo (yellow card) 39'; Zé Eduardo (yellow card) 41'; Neymar (yellow card) 88'	Report	(yellow card) 9' Formica; (yellow card) 33' Burgos; (yellow card) 54' Barreto; (yellow card) 78' Pedro Benítez; 90+2' (pen.) Nanni	Stadium: Vila Belmiro; Referee: (Argentina) Héctor Baldassi

16 March 3	Colo-Colo (Chile)	3–2	(Brazil) Santos	Santiago, Chile
21:50 UTC−03:00	Paredes 27' (yellow card) 29'; Mena (yellow card) 34'; Miralles 35'; Scotti (yellow card) 41' (goal) 42'; Cabión (yellow card) 45'; Cabrera (yellow card) 59'	Report	5' (yellow card) 90+3' Elano; (yellow card) 37' Pará; 49' (yellow card) 62' Neymar; (yellow card) 52' Rodrigo Possebon	Stadium: Monumental David Arellano; Referee: (Argentina) Sergio Pezzotta

6 April 4	Santos (Brazil)	3–2	(Chile) Colo-Colo	Santos
21:50 UTC−03:00	Neymar 52' (yellow card) 9' (yellow-red card) 53'; Elano 34' (yellow card) 39' (red card) 90'; Danilo 36'; Léo (yellow card) 51'; Zé Eduardo (red card) 56'; Rafael (yellow card) 90+5'	Report	(yellow card) 39' Wilchez; (yellow card) 43' (goal) 82' Jerez; (red card) 56' Scotti; (yellow card) 66' Magalhaes; (yellow card) 75' Cabión; 87' Rubio; (yellow card) 90+5' Cabrera; (red card) 90+6' Jorquera	Stadium: Vila Belmiro; Referee: (Uruguay) Roberto Silvera

14 April 5	Cerro Porteño (Paraguay)	1–2	(Brazil) Santos	Asunción, Paraguay
20:30 UTC−03:00	Burgos (yellow card) 51'; Cardozo (yellow card) 60'; Pedro Benítez 90+4'	Report	12' Danilo; 48' Maikon Leite; (yellow card) 51' Adriano; (yellow card) 83' Arouca; (yellow card) 89' Edu Dracena	Stadium: General Pablo Rojas; Referee: (Uruguay) Martín Vázquez

20 April 6	Santos (Brazil)	3–1	(Venezuela) Deportivo Táchira	São Paulo
19:30 UTC−03:00	Neymar 4'; Jonathan 13'; Danilo 72'	Report	(yellow card) 10' Yégüez; (yellow card) 25' Zafra; (yellow card) 58' Fernández; 69' (yellow card) 77' Chacón; (yellow card) 79' Rouga	Stadium: Pacaembu; Referee: (Argentina) Nelson Pittana

==== Knockout stage ====
===== Round of 16 =====
27 April 1st Leg	Santos (Brazil)	1–0	(Mexico) América	Santos
21:50 UTC−03:00	Danilo (yellow card) 17'; Ganso 38'; Adriano (yellow card) 90+1'	Report	(yellow card) 14' Rojas; (yellow card) 50' Mosquera; (red card) 90+2' Layún	Stadium: Vila Belmiro; Referee: (Uruguay) Jorge Larrionda

3 May 2nd Leg	América (Mexico)	0–0 (0–1 agg.)	(Brazil) Santos	Santiago de Querétaro, Mexico
22:45 UTC−03:00	Sánchez (yellow card) 52'; Valenzuela (yellow card) 55'; Reyes (yellow card) 59'; Reyna (yellow card) 90'	Report	(yellow card) 85' Léo	Stadium: La Corregidora; Referee: (Ecuador) Carlos Vera

===== Quarter-finals =====
11 May 1st Leg	Once Caldas (Colombia)	0–1	(Brazil) Santos	Manizales, Colombia
21:55 UTC−03:00	Calle (red card) 59'; Palacios (yellow card) 65'	Report	42' Alan Patrick; (yellow card) 56' Rafael; (yellow card) 58' Edu Dracena; (yellow card) 90' Zé Eduardo	Stadium: Palogrande; Referee: (Venezuela) Juan Soto

18 May 2nd Leg	Santos (Brazil)	1–1 (2–1 agg.)	(Colombia) Once Caldas	São Paulo
22:00 UTC−03:00	Neymar 12'; Arouca (yellow card) 89'; Rafael (yellow card) 90+3'	Report	(yellow card) 19' Henriquez; 30' Rentería; (yellow card) 90+1' Moreno	Stadium: Pacaembu; Referee: (Chile) Enrique Osses

===== Semi-finals =====
25 May 1st Leg	Santos (Brazil)	1–0	(Paraguay) Cerro Porteño	São Paulo
21:50 UTC−03:00	Arouca (yellow card) 12'; Neymar (yellow card) 24'; Edu Dracena 43'	Report	(yellow card) 9' Villarreal; (yellow card) 28' Caceres; (yellow card) 51' Torres; (yellow card) 88' Nanni	Stadium: Pacaembu; Referee: (Uruguay) Jorge Larrionda

1 June 2nd Leg	Cerro Porteño (Paraguay)	3–3 (3–4 agg.)	(Brazil) Santos	Asunción, Paraguay
21:50 UTC−03:00	César Benítez 31'; Iturbe (yellow card) 45'; Lucero 60'; Uglessich (yellow card) 72'; Fabbro 81'	Report	2' Zé Eduardo; (yellow card) 10' Alex Sandro; (yellow card) 25' Jonathan; 28' (o.g.) Barreto; (yellow card) 38' Elano; 45+2' Neymar; (yellow card) 90+1' Rafael; (yellow card) 90+1' (red card) 90+4' Edu Dracena	Stadium: General Pablo Rojas; Referee: (Colombia) Wilmar Roldán

===== Finals =====
15 June 1st Leg	Peñarol (Uruguay)	0–0	(Brazil) Santos	Montevideo, Uruguay
21:55 UTC−03:00	Martinuccio (yellow card) 30'; Corujo (yellow card) 66'; González (yellow card) 76'	Report	(yellow card) 19' Neymar; (yellow card) 60' Arouca	Stadium: Centenario; Referee: (Paraguay) Carlos Amarilla

22 June 2nd Leg	Santos (Brazil)	2–1 (2–1 agg.)	(Uruguay) Peñarol	São Paulo
21:50 UTC−03:00	Neymar (yellow card) 35' (goal) 47'; Zé Eduardo (yellow card) 58'; Danilo 69'	Report	(yellow card) 31' González; (yellow card) 54' Corujo; (yellow card) 74' Freitas; 80' (o.g.) Durval	Stadium: Pacaembu; Referee: (Argentina) Sergio Pezzotta
