= Éder Lima =

Éder Lima may refer to:

- Éder Lima (futsal player) (born 1984), Russian futsal player
- Éder Lima (footballer, born 1986), Brazilian football centre-back
- Éder Lima (footballer, born 1987), Brazilian football forward
