= Bastos (surname) =

Bastos is a habitational surname of from Portugal and Galicia. Notable people with the name include:

== Arts and entertainment ==
- Augusto Roa Bastos (1917–2005), Paraguayan novelist and short story writer
- Carlos Bastos (1925–2004), Brazilian artist and painter, leader of the Brazilian Modernist Movement
- Juan Fernando Bastos (born 1958), American portrait artist of Bolivian descent
- Lionel Bastos (born 1956), Mozambique singer, songwriter and music producer
- Maria João Bastos (born 1975), Portuguese actress
- Othon Bastos (born 1933), Brazilian film actor
- Rafinha Bastos (born 1976), Brazilian comedian, journalist and television personality
- Vânia Bastos (born 1956), Brazilian singer
- Waldemar Bastos (1954–2020), Angolan musician
- Patrícia Bastos (born 1970), Brazilian singer-songwriter

== Sports ==
- Alberto Bastos Lopes (born 1959), Portuguese former footballer
- Ángel Bastos (born 1992), Spanish footballer
- António Bastos Lopes (born 1953), Portuguese footballer
- Édson Bastos (born 1979), Brazilian footballer
- Fabrício Bastos (born 1981), Brazilian footballer
- Fellipe Bastos (born 1990), Brazilian footballer
- Fransérgio Bastos (born 1980), Brazilian footballer
- Gustavo Bastos (born 1983), Brazilian footballer known as Gustavo
- José de Bastos (1929–2020), Portuguese footballer
- Leonardo Lourenço Bastos (born 1975), Brazilian footballer, also known as Léo
- Marina Bastos (born 1971), Portuguese athlete
- Mauro Bastos (born 1979), Portuguese footballer
- Michel Bastos (born 1983), Brazilian international footballer
- Tuta (Moacir Bastos, born 1974), Brazilian footballer
- Rafael Bastos (born 1985), Brazilian footballer
- Rafael Alves Bastos (born 1982), Brazilian footballer
- Rodrigo Bastos (born 1967), Brazilian sport shooter
- Tomas Bastos (born 1992), Brazilian footballer
- Vítor Bastos (born 1990), Portuguese footballer
- Yannick Bastos (born 1993), Luxembourger footballer

== Others ==
- Armando Baptista-Bastos (1933–2017), Portuguese journalist and writer
- Aureliano Cândido Tavares Bastos (1839–1875), Brazilian politician, writer and journalist
- Fernando Bastos de Ávila (1918–2010), Brazilian Roman Catholic priest
- Francisco de Paula Bastos (1793–1881), Portuguese noble, military and political figure
- Jean-Claude Bastos de Morais (born 1967), Swiss-Angolan entrepreneur
- José Moreira Bastos Neto (1953–2014), Brazilian Roman Catholic bishop
- Márcio Thomaz Bastos (1935–2014), Brazilian politician and minister
- Regina Bastos (born 1960), Portuguese lawyer and former politician

== See also ==
- Bastos (disambiguation)
