= Rafael Caldeira =

Brazilian footballer (born 1991)

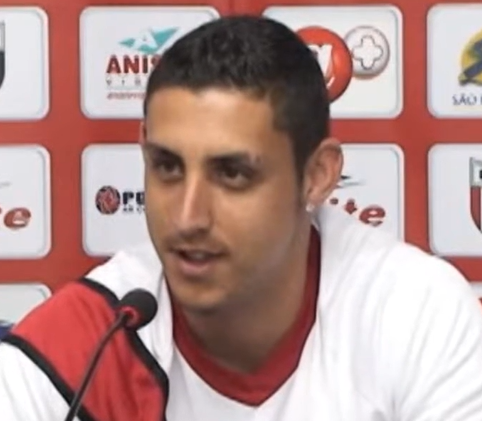
- Rafael Caldeira in 2013

Personal information
- Full name: Rafael Caldeira Pires
- Date of birth: 11 February 1991 (age 35)
- Place of birth: Monte Alto, São Paulo, Brazil
- Height: 1.91 m (6 ft 3 in)
- Position: Centre-back

Youth career
- 2007–2009: Marília
- 2010–2011: Santos

Senior career*
| Years | Team | Apps | (Gls) |
| 2009 | Marília | 7 | (0) |
| 2010–2014 | Santos | 15 | (1) |
| 2010 | → Red Bull Brasil (loan) | 3 | (0) |
| 2011 | → Oeste (loan) | 8 | (0) |
| 2011 | → ABC (loan) | 7 | (0) |
| 2012 | → Bragantino (loan) | 20 | (2) |
| 2013 | → Botafogo-SP (loan) | 4 | (1) |
| 2014 | → Botafogo-SP (loan) | 3 | (0) |
| 2014 | → Mirassol (loan) | 9 | (0) |
| 2015 | Guarani | 10 | (1) |
| 2016 | Marília | 3 | (0) |
| 2016 | Olímpia | 7 | (0) |
| 2017 | Paulista | 9 | (0) |
| 2018 | CEOV | 7 | (0) |
| 2018 | Itumbiara | 6 | (0) |
| 2018 | Jaraguá | 12 | (2) |
| 2018 | Nova Iguaçu | 4 | (0) |
| 2019 | Ji-Paraná | 6 | (0) |
| 2019 | Central | 2 | (0) |
| 2019–2020 | Jaraguá | 1 | (0) |
| 2020 | Operário-MS | 2 | (1) |
| 2020 | Democrata-GV | 5 | (1) |
| 2020 | Operário-MS | 2 | (0) |
| 2021 | Jaraguá | 0 | (0) |
| 2021 | Desportiva Ferroviária | 4 | (0) |
| 2021–2022 | Democrata-GV | 28 | (1) |
| 2022 | Aymorés | 8 | (0) |
| 2022 | Novo Esporte | 8 | (2) |
| 2023 | Democrata-GV | 11 | (0) |
| 2023 | Portuguesa-MS | 5 | (1) |
| 2024 | Democrata-GV | 1 | (1) |
| 2024 | Varginha | 10 | (0) |
| Total | | 200 | (14) |
- * Club domestic league appearances and goals

Rafael Caldeira Pires (born 11 February 1991), known as Rafael Caldeira, is a Brazilian retired footballer who played as a centre-back.

== Club career ==
=== Early career ===
Born in Monte Alto, São Paulo, He was revealed by MAC, where he stayed from 2005 to 2009. Caldera became professional in the MAC in early 2009. After the play the Copa São Paulo de Juniores for the Tiger, the defender was incorporated into the first team, who played the Paulistão. He plays some games for MAC and did not take long to transfer to Santos FC.

=== Santos and loans ===
Caldeira had one game for Santos Futebol Clube professional team, and this debut game was the Santos vs Corinthians (The Alvinegro's Duel), in 22/09/10. He started before the half-time as a substitute, because the injury of Bruno Aguiar. Santos was defeated by Corinthians by 3-2, with a Corinthians' irregular goal.

Caldeira helped Santos to reach the final of the Copa São Paulo de Futebol Júnior 2010, but with a controversial refereeing decision that the team lost by 3–0 on penalties after a 1–1 tie in regulation time. In August 2011, he was loaned to Série B club ABC.

On 16 May 2012, Caldeira was loaned again, this time to Bragantino. On 8 December, he was loaned to Botafogo-SP, alongside two other players.

== Anti-doping rule violation ==
In 2015 Caldeira received a public warning after testing positive for the banned steroid medication Dexamethasone.

== Career statistics ==
Appearances and goals by club, season and competition
| Club | Season | League | | | State League | | National Cup | | Continental | | Other | | Total | |
| Club | Season | Division | Apps | Goals | Apps | Goals | Apps | Goals | Apps | Goals | Apps | Goals | Apps | Goals |
|---|---|---|---|---|---|---|---|---|---|---|---|---|---|---|
| Marília | 2009 | Série C | 0 | 0 | 7 | 0 | — | | — | | — | | 7 | 0 |
| Santos | 2010 | Série A | 2 | 0 | 0 | 0 | 0 | 0 | — | | — | | 2 | 0 |
| Santos | 2011 | Série A | 1 | 0 | 0 | 0 | — | | 0 | 0 | — | | 1 | 0 |
| Santos | 2012 | Série A | 0 | 0 | 2 | 1 | — | | 0 | 0 | — | | 2 | 1 |
| Santos | 2013 | Série A | 0 | 0 | 0 | 0 | 0 | 0 | — | | — | | 0 | 0 |
| Santos | 2014 | Série A | 0 | 0 | 0 | 0 | 0 | 0 | — | | — | | 0 | 0 |
| Santos | Subtotal | | 3 | 0 | 2 | 1 | 0 | 0 | 0 | 0 | — | | 5 | 1 |
| Red Bull Brasil (loan) | 2010 | Paulista A2 | — | | 3 | 0 | — | | — | | — | | 3 | 0 |
| Oeste (loan) | 2011 | Série D | — | | 7 | 0 | — | | — | | — | | 7 | 0 |
| ABC (loan) | 2011 | Série B | 7 | 0 | — | | — | | — | | — | | 7 | 0 |
| Bragantino (loan) | 2012 | Série B | 20 | 2 | — | | — | | — | | — | | 20 | 2 |
| Botafogo-SP (loan) | 2013 | Série D | 0 | 0 | 4 | 1 | — | | — | | — | | 4 | 1 |
| Botafogo-SP (loan) | 2014 | Paulista | — | | 3 | 0 | — | | — | | — | | 3 | 0 |
| Botafogo-SP (loan) | Subtotal | | 0 | 0 | 7 | 1 | — | | — | | — | | 7 | 1 |
| Mirassol (loan) | 2014 | Paulista A2 | — | | — | | — | | — | | 9 (Note: Appearance(s) in Copa Paulista) | 0 | 9 | 0 |
| Guarani | 2015 | Série C | 0 | 0 | 10 | 1 | — | | — | | — | | 10 | 1 |
| Marília | 2016 | Paulista A2 | — | | 3 | 0 | — | | — | | — | | 3 | 0 |
| Olímpia | 2016 | Paulista A3 | — | | — | | — | | — | | 7 | 0 | 7 | 0 |
| Paulista | 2017 | Paulista A3 | — | | 9 | 0 | — | | — | | — | | 9 | 0 |
| CEOV | 2018 | Matogrossense | — | | 7 | 0 | — | | — | | — | | 7 | 0 |
| Itumbiara | 2018 | Série D | 6 | 0 | — | | — | | — | | — | | 6 | 0 |
| Jaraguá | 2018 | Goiano 2ª Divisão | — | | 12 | 2 | — | | — | | — | | 12 | 2 |
| Nova Iguaçu | 2019 | Carioca | — | | 4 | 0 | — | | — | | — | | 4 | 0 |
| Ji-Paraná | 2019 | Rondoniense | — | | 6 | 0 | — | | — | | — | | 6 | 0 |
| Central | 2019 | Série D | 2 | 0 | — | | — | | — | | — | | 2 | 0 |
| Jaraguá | 2019 | Goiano 2ª Divisão | — | | 1 | 0 | — | | — | | — | | 1 | 0 |
| Jaraguá | 2020 | Goiano | — | | 0 | 0 | — | | — | | — | | 0 | 0 |
| Jaraguá | Subtotal | | — | | 1 | 0 | — | | — | | — | | 1 | 0 |
| Operário-MS | 2020 | Sul-Mato-Grossense | — | | 4 | 1 | — | | — | | — | | 4 | 1 |
| Democrata-GV | 2020 | Mineiro Módulo II | — | | 5 | 1 | — | | — | | — | | 5 | 1 |
| Jaraguá | 2021 | Série D | 0 | 0 | 0 | 0 | 0 | 0 | — | | — | | 0 | 0 |
| Desportiva Ferroviária | 2021 | Capixaba | — | | 4 | 0 | — | | — | | — | | 4 | 0 |
| Democrata-GV | 2021 | Mineiro Módulo II | — | | 15 | 1 | — | | — | | — | | 15 | 1 |
| Democrata-GV | 2022 | Mineiro | — | | 13 | 0 | — | | — | | — | | 13 | 0 |
| Democrata-GV | Subtotal | | — | | 28 | 1 | — | | — | | — | | 28 | 1 |
| Aymorés | 2022 | Mineiro Módulo II | — | | 8 | 0 | — | | — | | — | | 8 | 0 |
| Novo Esporte | 2022 | Mineiro 2ª Divisão | — | | 8 | 2 | — | | — | | — | | 8 | 2 |
| Democrata-GV | 2023 | Série D | 10 | 0 | 1 | 0 | — | | — | | 1 (Note: Appearance(s) in Recopa Mineira) | 0 | 12 | 0 |
| Portuguesa-MS | 2023 | Sul-Mato-Grossense Série B | — | | 5 | 1 | — | | — | | — | | 5 | 1 |
| Democrata-GV | 2024 | Mineiro | — | | 1 | 1 | — | | — | | — | | 1 | 1 |
| Varginha | 2024 | Mineiro Módulo II | — | | 10 | 0 | — | | — | | — | | 10 | 0 |
| Career total | | | 48 | 2 | 152 | 12 | 0 | 0 | 0 | 0 | 17 | 0 | 217 | 14 |

== Honours ==
Santos

- Copa do Brasil: 2010
- Copa Libertadores: 2011
- Campeonato Paulista: 2012

Red Bull Brasil

- Campeonato Paulista Série A3: 2010

Portuguesa-MS

- Campeonato Sul-Mato-Grossense Série B: 2023
