= Bruno Aguiar (Brazilian footballer) =

Brazilian footballer (born 1986)

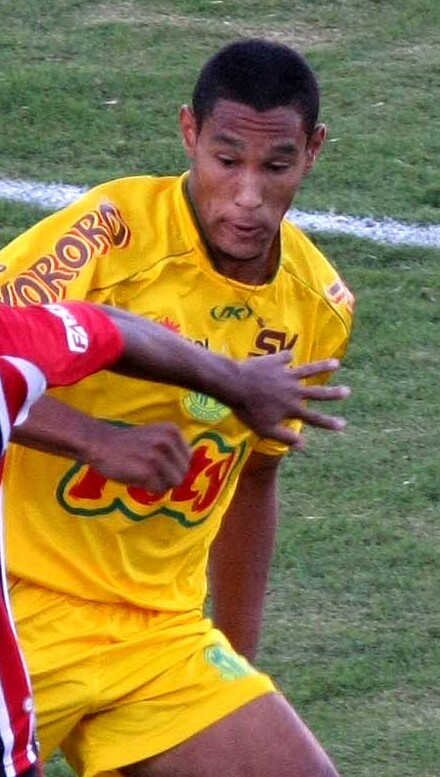
- Bruno Aguiar playing for Mirassol in 2008

Personal information
- Full name: Bruno Henrique Fortunato Aguiar
- Date of birth: 25 March 1986 (age 40)
- Place of birth: Amparo, Brazil
- Height: 1.86 m (6 ft 1 in)
- Position: Centre-back

Youth career
- 2000–2005: Ponte Preta

Senior career*
Years	Team	Apps	(Gls)
2005	Ponte Preta	0	(0)
2006–2007	Barbate		
2007	Barueri	0	(0)
2008–2009	Mirassol	28	(2)
2008	→ Figueirense (loan)	20	(1)
2009	→ Guarani (loan)	36	(2)
2010–2011	Santos	38	(2)
2012–2013	Sport Recife	42	(4)
2013	→ São Caetano (loan)	12	(0)
2014–2017	Joinville	104	(12)
2016–2017	→ Muaither SC (loan)	25	(1)
2017	Goiás	1	(0)
2018	Joinville	14	(0)
2019	Brasil de Pelotas	35	(2)
2020–2022	Novorizontino	78	(4)
2022	Brusque	13	(1)
2023	São Bento	11	(0)
2024	Oeste	7	(0)
Total		464	(31)
- * Club domestic league appearances and goals

Bruno Henrique Fortunato Aguiar (born 25 March 1986), known as Bruno Aguiar, is a Brazilian retired footballer who played as a centre-back.

== Career ==
Born in Amparo, São Paulo, Bruno Aguiar began his career in youth football schools in his hometown before joining Ponte Preta in 2000. He remained six years at the club, being promoted to the first team in 2005, but failed to make any appearances.

In 2006, as his contract was not renewed, Bruno Aguiar moved abroad and joined Spanish Primera Andaluza side Barbate. Back to his home country in the following year, he signed for Grêmio Barueri, but only played for a B-team in the 2007 Copa Paulista.

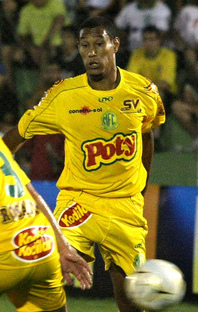
Bruno Aguiar playing for Mirassol in 2008

Ahead of the 2008 season, Bruno Aguiar joined Mirassol. A regular starter in the 2008 Campeonato Paulista, he agreed to a deal with Figueirense on 30 May of that year.

Bruno Aguiar made his Série A debut on 7 June 2008, starting in a 5–0 away loss to Flamengo. He scored his first goal in the category on 23 August, but in a 2–1 home loss to Vitória, and was regularly used as his side suffered relegation.

Back to Mirassol for the 2009 Paulistão, Bruno Aguiar joined Série B side Guarani on 23 April of that year. On 18 December, after being an undisputed starter as the club achieved promotion to the top tier, he left after refusing a new deal.

On 23 December 2009, Bruno Aguiar agreed to a three-year contract with Santos, after the club bought 50% of his economic rights from Energy Sports. A backup option to Edu Dracena and Durval, he was a part of the squad which won the 2010 Copa do Brasil, 2011 Copa Libertadores and two Paulista titles; he also came on in the semifinals of the 2011 FIFA Club World Cup against Kashiwa Reysol, but did not feature in the final.

On 16 January 2012, Bruno Aguiar signed a two-year deal with Sport Recife. Despite being regularly used, he was loaned to São Caetano on 27 February 2013,

On 12 January 2014, Bruno Aguiar joined Joinville on a two-year contract. A first-choice, he helped the club in their top-tier promotion in his first season.

On 20 July 2016, Bruno Aguiar moved abroad and joined Qatar Stars League side Muaither SC for one year. Upon returning, he rescinded his contract with Joinville on 8 June 2017, and was presented at Goiás late in the month.

After only one appearance for Goiás, Bruno Aguiar returned to JEC on 17 January 2018. On 22 December, he moved to Brasil de Pelotas, before returning to his home state with Novorizontino on 19 December 2019.

Bruno Aguiar took part in the Novorizontino squads, which achieved two consecutive promotions, before leaving the club on 31 March 2022. On 5 April, he was announced at Brusque.

On 26 December 2022, Bruno Aguiar joined São Bento for the upcoming season. He played for Oeste in the 2024 Campeonato Paulista Série A2, before retiring shortly after at the age of 38.

== Career statistics ==
Appearances and goals by club, season and competition
Club	Season	League			State League		Cup		Continental		Other		Total	
Club	Season	Division	Apps	Goals	Apps	Goals	Apps	Goals	Apps	Goals	Apps	Goals	Apps	Goals
Ponte Preta	2005	Série A	0	0	0	0	—		—		—		0	0
Barueri	2007	Série B	0	0	0	0	—		—		6 (Note: Appearance(s) in Copa Paulista)	0	6	0
Mirassol	2008	Série C	—		15	2	—		—		—		15	2
Mirassol	2009	Série D	—		13	0	—		—		—		13	0
Mirassol	Subtotal		—		28	2	—		—		—		28	2
Figueirense (loan)	2008	Série A	20	1	—		—		—		—		20	1
Guarani (loan)	2009	Série B	36	2	—		—		—		—		36	2
Santos	2010	Série A	10	0	6	0	3	0	—		—		19	0
Santos	2011	Série A	17	2	5	0	—		5 (Note: Appearance(s) in Copa Libertadores)	0	1 (Note: Appearance(s) in FIFA Club World Cup)	0	28	2
Santos	Subtotal		27	2	11	0	3	0	5	0	1	0	47	2
Sport Recife	2012	Série A	22	1	20	3	2	1	—		—		44	5
São Caetano (loan)	2013	Série B	5	0	7	0	2	0	—		4	0	18	0
Joinville	2014	Série B	33	2	8	0	1	0	—		—		42	2
Joinville	2015	Série A	18	2	14	1	2	0	1 (Note: Appearance(s) in Copa Sudamericana)	0	—		35	3
Joinville	2016	Série B	13	0	18	7	3	0	—		—		34	7
Joinville	Subtotal		64	4	40	8	6	0	1	0	—		111	12
Muaither SC (loan)	2016–17	Qatar Stars League	25	1	—		—		—		—		25	1
Goiás	2017	Série B	1	0	—		—		—		—		1	0
Joinville	2018	Série C	6	0	8	0	2	0	—		—		16	0
Brasil de Pelotas	2019	Série B	34	2	1	0	1	0	—		—		36	2
Novorizontino	2020	Série D	18	1	12	1	1	0	—		—		31	2
Novorizontino	2021	Série C	23	1	14	1	—		—		—		37	1
Novorizontino	2022	Série C	—		11	0	1	0	—		—		12	0
Novorizontino	Subtotal		41	2	37	2	2	0	—		—		80	4
Brusque	2022	Série B	13	1	—		—		—		—		13	1
São Bento	2023	Paulista	—		11	0	—		—		—		11	0
Oeste	2024	Paulista A2	—		7	0	—		—		—		7	0
Career total			294	16	170	15	18	1	6	0	11	0	499	32

== Honours ==
Santos

- Campeonato Paulista: 2010, 2011
- Copa do Brasil: 2010
- Copa Libertadores: 2011

Joinville

- Campeonato Brasileiro Série B: 2014
