= Fausto (footballer, born 1980) =

Brazilian footballer

Personal information
- Full name: Fausto Luis Momente Silva
- Date of birth: 12 December 1980 (age 45)
- Place of birth: Mirandópolis, Brazil
- Height: 1.82 m (6 ft 0 in)
- Position: Forward

Senior career*
| Years | Team | Apps | (Gls) |
| 1998 | América–SP | | |
| 1999–2000 | Linense | | |
| 2001–2002 | Sertãozinho | | |
| 2003 | União Barbarense | | |
| 2003–2005 | Viktoria Aschaffenburg | | |
| 2005–2006 | Diagoras | | |
| 2006 | Anápolis | | |
| 2007–2010 | Linense | | |
| 2008 | → Goiás (loan) | 4 | (0) |
| 2010–2012 | Juventude | 6 | (1) |
| 2011–2012 | → Linense (loan) | | |
| 2012 | Marília | 4 | (1) |
| 2012 | Botafogo–SP | | |
| 2013 | Linense | | |
| 2013 | Botafogo–PB | 13 | (4) |
| 2013 | Linense | | |
| 2014 | Monte Azul | | |
- * Club domestic league appearances and goals as of 16 March 2017

Fausto Luis Momente Silva (born December 12, 1980, in Mirandópolis), known as Fausto, is a retired Brazilian footballer who played as forward.

== Career statistics ==
As of 16 March 2017

| Club | Season | League | | | State League | | Cup | | Conmebol | | Other | | Total | |
| Club | Season | Division | Apps | Goals | Apps | Goals | Apps | Goals | Apps | Goals | Apps | Goals | Apps | Goals |
|---|---|---|---|---|---|---|---|---|---|---|---|---|---|---|
| Linense | 2010 | Paulista A2 | — | | 25 | 24 | — | | — | | — | | 25 | 24 |
| Juventude | 2010 | Série C | 6 | 1 | — | | — | | — | | — | | 6 | 1 |
| Linense | 2011 | Paulista | — | | 8 | 4 | — | | — | | — | | 8 | 4 |
| Linense | 2012 | Paulista | — | | 6 | 1 | — | | — | | — | | 6 | 1 |
| Linense | Subtotal | | — | | 14 | 5 | — | | — | | — | | 14 | 5 |
| Marília | 2012 | Série D | 4 | 1 | — | | — | | — | | — | | 4 | 1 |
| Linense | 2013 | Paulista | — | | 15 | 5 | — | | — | | — | | 15 | 5 |
| Botafogo–PB | 2013 | Série D | 13 | 4 | — | | — | | — | | — | | 13 | 4 |
| Monte Azul | 2014 | Paulista A2 | — | | 9 | 4 | — | | — | | — | | 9 | 4 |
| Career total | | | 23 | 6 | 63 | 38 | 0 | 0 | 0 | 0 | 0 | 0 | 86 | 44 |
