= Bastos =

Bastos may refer to:

- Bastos (surname)
- Bastos (footballer, born 1991) (born 1991)
- Bastos (cigarette), a Spanish brand
- Bastos Racing Team, a 2001–02 Belgian WRC auto racing team
- Bastos, a neighborhood of Yaoundé, Cameroon
- Bastos, Brazil
