= Renan Mota =

Brazilian footballer

Personal information
- Full name: Renan Carvalho Mota
- Date of birth: 1 October 1991 (age 35)
- Place of birth: Marabá, Brazil
- Height: 1.65 m (5 ft 5 in)
- Position: Attacking midfielder

Youth career
- 2007–2011: Santos

Senior career*
Years	Team	Apps	(Gls)
2011–2013	Santos	1	(0)
2011	→ União São João (loan)	3	(0)
2011	→ Sport Barueri (loan)	7	(2)
2012	→ Democrata-GV (loan)	4	(0)
2012	→ Ituano (loan)	0	(0)
2013	→ Araxá (loan)		
2013	→ Penapolense (loan)	5	(0)
2014	Monte Azul	17	(4)
2014	→ Guarani (loan)	14	(1)
2015	São Bento	13	(2)
2015–2016	Oeste	41	(4)
2017	São Bento	11	(0)
2017–2018	Figueirense	58	(6)
2019–2020	Kyoto Sanga	18	(0)
2021	Ponte Preta	9	(0)
2021–2022	Vila Nova	20	(2)
2022	Coimbra	0	(0)
2022	→ Vila Nova (loan)	13	(2)
2022–2023	Floresta	15	(1)
2023	São Bento	9	(0)
2023	Capital CF		
- * Club domestic league appearances and goals as of 5 March 2023

Renan Carvalho Mota (born 1 October 1991), is a Brazilian footballer who plays as an attacking midfielder.

== Club career ==
Born in Marabá, Pará, Renan Mota graduated from Santos' youth setup. On 8 February 2011 he was loaned to União São João, making his senior debuts for the side.

After a short loan stint at Sport Barueri, Renan Mota made his Série A debut for Peixe on 29 June 2011, coming on as a late substitute for Rychely in a 1–2 away loss against Figueirense. He was subsequently loaned to Democrata-GV, Ituano and Araxá, failing to settle with any of them.

In August 2013 Renan Mota joined Monte Azul permanently. On 29 April of the following year he moved to Guarani, in a temporary deal until December.

On 24 November 2014 Renan Mota signed for São Bento, newly promoted to Campeonato Paulista.
