= Walace (footballer, born 1993) =

Brazilian footballer

Personal information
- Full name: Walace de Sousa Novais
- Date of birth: 25 May 1993 (age 33)
- Place of birth: São Paulo, Brazil
- Height: 1.91 m (6 ft 3 in)
- Position: Centre-back

Team information
- Current team: Juventude Samas

Youth career
- 2008–2013: Santos

Senior career*
Years	Team	Apps	(Gls)
2011–2014	Santos	1	(0)
2014	→ Guarani (loan)	1	(0)
2015–2016	Luverdense	3	(0)
2017	URT	0	(0)
2018	Pelotas	9	(0)
2018	Penapolense	0	(0)
2019	Mixto	0	(0)
2019	Jequié	3	(0)
2019	Inter de Limeira	0	(0)
2020	Moto Club	9	(0)
2021–	Juventude Samas	3	(0)
- * Club domestic league appearances and goals as of 00:58, 5 March 2021 (UTC)

Walace de Sousa Novais (born 25 May 1993), simply known as Walace, is a Brazilian professional footballer who plays as a centre-back for Juventude Samas.

== Career ==
Born in São Paulo, Walace joined Santos youth setup in 2008, aged 15. He made his first team debut on 11 June 2011, in a 1–1 away draw against Cruzeiro EC.

On 3 June 2013, he was promoted to Santos' first team alongside Léo Cittadini. On 4 February 2014, he was loaned to Guarani, but appeared rarely.

On 19 December 2014, Walace signed for Luverdense, after his link with Peixe expired.

== Career statistics ==
As of 3 November 2023

Appearances and goals by club, season and competition
Club	Season	League			State League		National cup		Continental		Other		Total	
Club	Season	Division	Apps	Goals	Apps	Goals	Apps	Goals	Apps	Goals	Apps	Goals	Apps	Goals
Santos	2011	Série A	1	0	0	0	0	0	—		—		1	0
Santos	2012	Série A	0	0	0	0	0	0	—		—		0	0
Santos	2013	Série A	0	0	0	0	0	0	—		—		0	0
Santos	2014	Série A	0	0	0	0	0	0	—		—		0	0
Santos	Total		1	0	0	0	0	0	—		—		1	0
Guarani (loan)	2014	Série C	—		1	0	—		—		—		1	0
Luverdense	2015	Série B	2	0	10	0	3	0	—		3 (Note: Appearance(s) in Copa Verde)	0	18	0
Luverdense	2016	Série B	3	0	3	0	—		—		—		6	0
Luverdense	Total		5	0	13	0	3	0	—		3	0	24	0
URT	2017	Série D	—		0	0	0	0	—		—		0	0
Pelotas	2018	Gaúcho A2	—		9	0	—		—		—		9	0
Penapolense	2018	Paulista A2	—		—		—		—		8 (Note: Appearance(s) in Copa Paulista)	0	8	0
Mixto	2019	Mato-Grossense	—		0	0	—		—		—		0	0
Jequié	2019	Baiano	—		3	0	—		—		—		3	0
Inter de Limeira	2019	Paulista A2	—		—		—		—		3	0	3	0
Moto Club	2020	Série D	1	0	8	0	1	1	—		—		10	1
Juventude Samas	2021	Série D	6	0	11	0	1	0	—		—		18	0
Paragominas	2022	Paraense	—		3	0	—		—		—		3	0
4 de Julho	2023	Piauiense	—		10	1	—		—		—		10	1
Career total			13	0	58	1	5	1	0	0	14	0	90	2
