= Leandro Silva (footballer, born 1988) =

Brazilian footballer

Personal information
- Full name: Leandro da Silva
- Date of birth: 22 September 1988 (age 38)
- Place of birth: Sorocaba, Brazil
- Height: 1.81 m (5 ft 11 1/2 in)
- Position: Right back

Team information
- Current team: Betim

Youth career
- 2006–2008: São Caetano

Senior career*
Years	Team	Apps	(Gls)
2008–2011	Atlético Sorocaba	38	(2)
2011	→ Santos (loan)	4	(0)
2012	Guaratinguetá	37	(2)
2013	Ituano	17	(0)
2013	América Mineiro	27	(1)
2014–2016	Figueirense	112	(4)
2017–2018	Avaí	47	(3)
2018	→ Ceará (loan)	12	(1)
2018	→ Coritiba (loan)	25	(0)
2019–2020	América Mineiro	52	(4)
2020–2021	Vitória	10	(0)
2021	Confiança	13	(0)
2021	Paysandu	11	(2)
2022	Água Santa	7	(0)
2022	Paysandu	10	(0)
2023	Inter de Limeira	10	(0)
2023–	Betim		
- * Club domestic league appearances and goals as of 25 February 2023

Leandro da Silva (born 22 September 1988) is a Brazilian footballer who plays as a right back for Betim.

== Club career ==
Born in Sorocaba, São Paulo, Leandro graduated from São Caetano's youth setup, but made his senior debuts with hometown's Atlético Sorocaba in 2008, aged 19. On 14 July 2011 he signed a short-term deal with Santos.

Leandro played his first match as a professional on 7 August 2011, starting and being booked in a 1–0 home win against Ceará for the Série A championship. However, he only appeared in four matches during the campaign, and was subsequently released.

In January 2012 Leandro joined Guaratinguetá. After being used mostly as a backup during that year's Campeonato Paulista, he was an undisputed starter during the Série B season, appearing in 30 matches and scoring once.

On 20 December 2012 Leandro moved to Ituano, appearing regularly in the state leagues. On 9 May 2013 he was presented at América Mineiro.

On 20 January 2014 Leandro signed for Figueirense. Initially as a backup, he appeared in all state league matches, and was an undisputed starter for the side during the campaign.

== Career statistics ==
As of 23 November 2023

Club	Season	League			State League		Cup		Continental		Other		Total	
Club	Season	Division	Apps	Goals	Apps	Goals	Apps	Goals	Apps	Goals	Apps	Goals	Apps	Goals
Atlético Sorocaba	2009	Paulista A2	—		11	0	1	0	—		—		12	0
Atlético Sorocaba	2010	Paulista A2	—		17	2	—		—		—		17	2
Atlético Sorocaba	2011	Paulista A2	—		21	0	—		—		—		21	0
Atlético Sorocaba	Total		—		49	2	1	0	—		—		50	2
Santos	2011	Série A	4	0	—		0	0	—		—		4	0
Guaratinguetá	2012	Série B	30	1	7	1	0	0	—		—		37	2
Ituano	2013	Paulista	—		17	0	—		—		—		17	0
América-MG	2013	Série B	23	1	—		4	0	—		—		27	1
Figueirense	2014	Série A	23	0	16	0	1	0	—		—		40	0
Figueirense	2015	Série A	32	1	15	0	8	1	—		—		55	2
Figueirense	2016	Série A	0	0	14	2	1	0	—		2	0	17	2
Figueirense	Total		55	1	45	2	10	1	—		2	0	112	4
Avaí	2017	Série A	32	1	13	2	2	0	—		0	0	47	3
Ceará (loan)	2018	Série A	0	0	11	1	1	0	—		0	0	12	1
Coritiba (loan)	2018	Série B	25	0	—		—		—		—		25	0
América Mineiro	2019	Série B	31	2	11	2	2	0	—		—		44	4
América Mineiro	2020	Série B	—		7	0	1	0	—		—		8	0
América Mineiro	Total		31	2	18	2	3	0	—		—		52	4
Vitória	2020	Série B	10	0	—		—		—		—		10	0
Confiança	2021	Série B	5	0	8	0	—		—		2	0	15	0
Paysandu	2021	Série C	11	2	—		—		—		2	0	13	2
Água Santa	2022	Paulista	—		7	0	—		—		—		7	0
Paysandu	2022	Série C	10	0	—		—		—		3	0	13	0
Inter de Limeira	2023	Paulista	—		10	0	—		—		—		10	0
Betim	2023	Mineiro II	—		9	0	—		—		—		9	0
Career total			236	8	194	10	21	1	—		9	0	460	19
