= Rômulo (footballer, born April 1990) =

Brazilian footballer

Personal information
- Full name: Rômulo Oliveira Amorim
- Date of birth: 19 April 1990 (age 36)
- Place of birth: Parambu, Brazil
- Position: Forward

Senior career*
Years	Team	Apps	(Gls)
2010	Tauá		
2010–2012	Juazeiro Empreendimentos		
2010	→ Guarani de Juazeiro (loan)		
2011	→ Ponte Preta (loan)	0	(0)
2011	→ Guarany de Sobral (loan)	1	(0)
2012	→ Bahia de Feira (loan)	0	(0)
2012–2013	Bahia de Feira	0	(0)
2013–2016	Vitória	4	(0)
2014	→ Paysandu (loan)	6	(2)
2015	→ Santo André (loan)	0	(0)
2015	→ Confiança (loan)	11	(2)
2016	→ América–RN (loan)	2	(0)
2017	Confiança	9	(1)
2018	ASA	4	(0)
2019	Atlético Cearense	8	(3)
2020	Floresta	0	(0)
2020	América–RN	0	(0)
- * Club domestic league appearances and goals as of 13:17, 20 April 2020 (UTC)

Rômulo Oliveira Amorim (born 19 April 1990), known as Rômulo, is a Brazilian footballer who plays as forward.

== Career ==
On 31 January 2020, América–RN announced that Rômulo had returned to the club. He was released in mid-February 2020.

== Career statistics ==
As of 17 March 2017

Club	Season	League			State League		Cup		Continental		Other		Total	
Club	Season	Division	Apps	Goals	Apps	Goals	Apps	Goals	Apps	Goals	Apps	Goals	Apps	Goals
Ponte Preta	2011	Série B	—		12	2	—		—		—		12	2
Guarany de Sobral	2011	Série C	1	0	—		—		—		—		1	0
Bahia de Feira	2012	Baiano	—		11	4	2	0	—		—		13	4
Bahia de Feira	2013	Baiano	—		15	13	—		—		—		15	13
Bahia de Feira	Subtotal		—		26	17	2	0	—		—		28	17
Vitória	2013	Série A	4	0	—		—		—		—		4	0
Paysandu	2014	Série C	6	2	—		1	0	—		—		7	2
Santo André	2015	Paulista A2	—		7	3	—		—		—		7	3
Confiança	2015	Série C	11	2	—		—		—		—		11	2
América–RN	2016	Série C	2	0	10	6	—		—		4 (Note: All appearance(s) in Copa do Nordeste)	2	16	8
Confiança	2017	Série C	—		5	0	—		—		—		5	0
Career total			24	4	60	28	3	0	0	0	4	2	91	34
