= Rodrigo Possebon =

Brazilian-born Italian footballer (born 1989)

Personal information
- Full name: Rodrigo Pereira Possebon
- Date of birth: 13 February 1989 (age 37)
- Place of birth: Sapucaia do Sul, Brazil
- Height: 1.84 m (6 ft 0 in)
- Position: Central midfielder

Team information
- Current team: Athletico Paranaense (director of football)

Youth career
- 2006–2008: Internacional

Senior career*
Years	Team	Apps	(Gls)
2008–2010	Manchester United	3	(0)
2009–2010	→ Braga (loan)	0	(0)
2010–2011	Santos	11	(0)
2012	Vicenza	0	(0)
2012	Criciúma	9	(0)
2013	Mirassol	0	(0)
2013	Juventude	7	(0)
2014	Náutico	7	(0)
2016	URT	0	(0)
2017	Passo Fundo	0	(0)
2018	Athletico Sports Club	0	(0)
2018	Ho Chi Minh City	0	(0)

International career^{‡}
2009	Italy U20	1	(0)
- * Club domestic league appearances and goals as of 14:30, 15 April 2018 (UTC) ‡ National team caps and goals as of 19:16, 30 June 2009 (UTC)

Rodrigo Pereira Possebon (born 13 February 1989) is a professional football executive and former player who played as a midfielder. He is the current director of football of Athletico Paranaense.

A box-to-box midfielder, as a youth, he played for Internacional in Brazil. He was spotted and signed by Manchester United in 2008. After two unsuccessful years with Manchester United which saw him only making 3 league appearances, he went on loan to Braga of Portugal for the first half of the 2009–10 season. He has since joined various clubs before joining Hồ Chí Minh City in 2018. Due to his ancestry, he was chosen to play for the Italy under-20s, playing one match for them in 2009.

== Club career ==
=== Early career ===
Born in Sapucaia do Sul, Rio Grande do Sul, Possebon began his football career playing for Internacional in a defensive midfield role. Possebon was spotted by Manchester United's Brazil-based scout, John Calvert-Toulmin, while following up the club's interest in twin full backs, Fabio and Rafael da Silva.

=== Manchester United ===
Manchester United signed Possebon in January 2008, and since his father is of Italian descent, Possebon qualified for an Italian passport, and so was not subject to European Union legislation regarding non-Europeans working in Europe. Possebon was allocated the number 34 shirt, which was vacated by Ryan Shawcross, for the remainder of the 2007–08 Premier League season. He made his professional debut for the club as a substitute, coming on for Ryan Giggs during the second half of the 1–1 draw with Newcastle United on 17 August.

On 23 September 2008, during a Football League Cup match, he was injured in a challenge by Middlesbrough captain Emanuel Pogatetz, for which the Austrian player received a straight red card. It was initially feared that he had broken his leg, but Manchester United later confirmed otherwise. Possebon made his return from injury on 22 October 2008, scoring in the Manchester United Reserves' 3–0 win over Manchester City.

Possebon made his FA Cup debut on 13 February 2009, coming on as a 72nd-minute substitute for Cristiano Ronaldo in a Fifth Round fixture with Derby County. On 1 March 2009, Possebon won his second trophy in English football after he was part of the Manchester United squad that beat Tottenham Hotspur 4–1 on penalties after the 2009 League Cup final finished goalless. He had previously been part of the team that captured the 2008 FA Community Shield.

Possebon joined Braga on loan, initially for the entire duration of the 2009–10 season. However, after falling out of favour, he returned to Old Trafford in January, after making just one appearance for the club.

=== Santos ===
On 19 August 2010, Santos announced that they had agreed terms with Possebon for his transfer from Manchester United. The two teams were still negotiating the fee for the transfer, but an announcement by Manchester United indicated that the transfer would be completed by the following day.

Possebon made his Santos debut in an away draw against Atlético Mineiro.

=== Later career ===
After leaving Santos, Possebon had unsuccessful spells with five different clubs in two years before taking a further two years out of the game. He followed his departure from Santos with a short spell with Italian club Vicenza, he didn't make an appearance before returning to Brazil to join Criciúma where he made 9 appearances. After a stint with Mirassol, Possebon joined Juventude and made just 7 appearances for the team before leaving. Before his break from football, he played seven times for Náutico in 2014. In 2016, two years later, Possebon officially signed for URT. He made his debut on 14 February in a 2–1 away win against Boa in the 2016 Campeonato Mineiro. He went on to make 7 appearances in total for URT in the Campeonato Mineiro as his side qualified for the semi-finals before being eliminated by Atlético Mineiro.

In 2017, Possebon joined Passo Fundo. He played eight times for the club during the 2017 Campeonato Gaúcho as they were relegated down to Série A2. On 7 January 2018, Possebon signed a contract with Hồ Chí Minh City in Vietnam. He was released a month later, on 22 February 2018, before the league season started after failing to impress.

== International career ==
Although he was born in Brazil, Possebon was eligible for an Italian passport due to his father's ancestry. He applied for an Italian passport when signing for Manchester United, in order to avoid work permit legislation for non-EU citizens working in the United Kingdom. Following a relatively successful first season with Manchester United, Possebon received a call-up from Italy under-20 coach Francesco Rocca for the penultimate match of the 2008–09 Four Nations tournament against Germany on 22 April 2009.

== Career statistics ==
=== Club ===
Appearances and goals by club, season and competition
Club	Season	League			State League		National cup (Note: Includes FA Cup, Taça de Portugal, Copa do Brasil, Coppa Italia)		League cup (Note: Includes League Cup, Taça da Liga)		Continental		Other		Total	
Club	Season	Division	Apps	Goals	Apps	Goals	Apps	Goals	Apps	Goals	Apps	Goals	Apps	Goals	Apps	Goals
Manchester United	2008-09	Premier League	3	0	—		2	0	3	0	0	0	0	0	8	0
Manchester United	2009-10	Premier League	0	0	—		0	0	0	0	0	0	0	0	0	0
Manchester United	Total		3	0	—		2	0	0	0	0	0	0	0	5	0
Braga (loan)	2009-10	Primeira Liga	0	0	—		0	0	0	0	1 (Note: Appearance(s) in UEFA Europa League)	0	—		1	0
Santos	2010	Série A	3	0	0	0	—		—		0	0	—		3	0
Santos	2011	Série A	8	0	17 (Note: Appearance(s) in Campeonato Paulista)	1	0	0	—		5 (Note: Appearance(s) in Copa Sudamericana)	0	0	0	30	1
Santos	Total		11	0	17	1	0	0	—		5	0	0	0	33	1
Vicenza	2011-12	Serie B	0	0	—		0	0	—		—		0	0	0	0
Criciúma	2012	Série B	9	0	0	0	0	0	—		—		—		9	0
Mirassol	2013	—			4	0	—		—		—		—		4	0
Juventude	2013	Série D	7	0	0	0	—		—		—		—		7	0
Náutico	2014	Série B	2	0	0	0	0	0	—		—		5 (Note: Appearance(s) in Copa do Nordeste)	0	7	0
URT	2016	Série D	0	0	7 (Note: Appearance(s) in Campeonato Mineiro)	1	—		—		—		—		7	1
Passo Fundo	2017	—			8 (Note: Appearance(s) in Campeonato Gaúcho)	0	—		—		—		—		8	0
Career total			32	0	36	2	2	0	3	0	6	0	5	0	84	2

== Honours ==
Internacional

- Campeonato Brasileiro Sub-20: 2006

Manchester United

- Football League Cup: 2008–09
- FA Community Shield: 2008

Santos

- Campeonato Paulista: 2011
- Copa Libertadores: 2011
