= Mirandópolis =

- Municipality
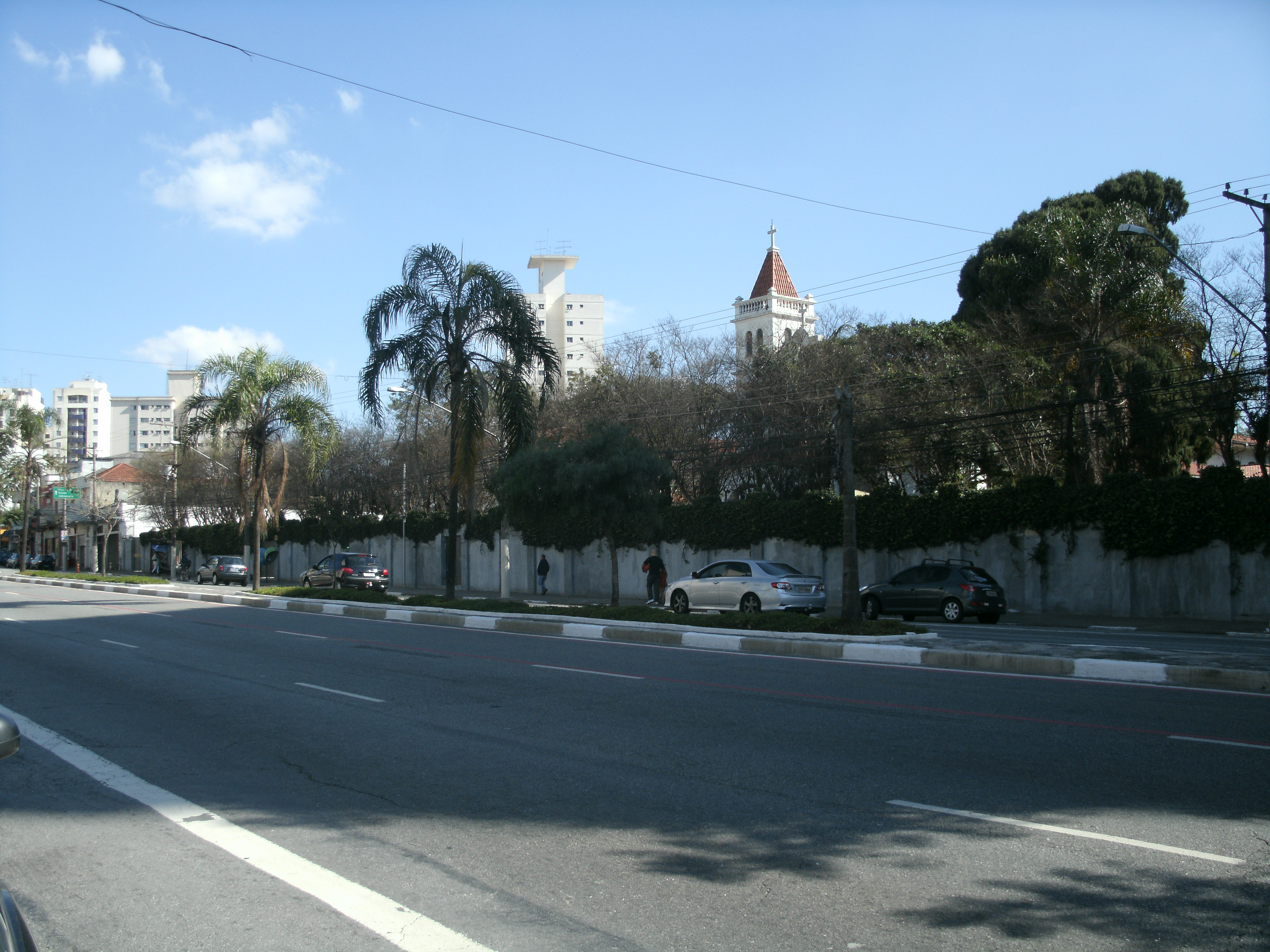

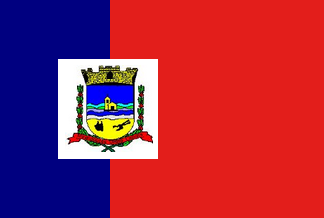
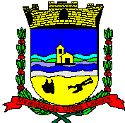
- Flag Coat of arms

- Location in São Paulo state

- Location in Brazil
- Coordinates: 21°8′1″S 51°6′6″W
- Country: Brazil
- Region: Southeast
- State: São Paulo

Government
  - Mayor: Francisco Antonio Passarelli Momesso

Area
  - Total: 918 km^{2} (354 sq mi)

Population (2020)
  - Total: 29,706
  - Density: 32.4/km^{2} (83.8/sq mi)
- Time zone: UTC−3 (BRT)

Mirandópolis is a municipality in the state of São Paulo in Brazil. The population is 29,706 (2020 est.) in an area of 918 km^{2}. The elevation is 429 m. Nickname is Cidade labor (labor city), and Demonymis mirandopolense.

== History ==
The municipality was created by state law in 1944.

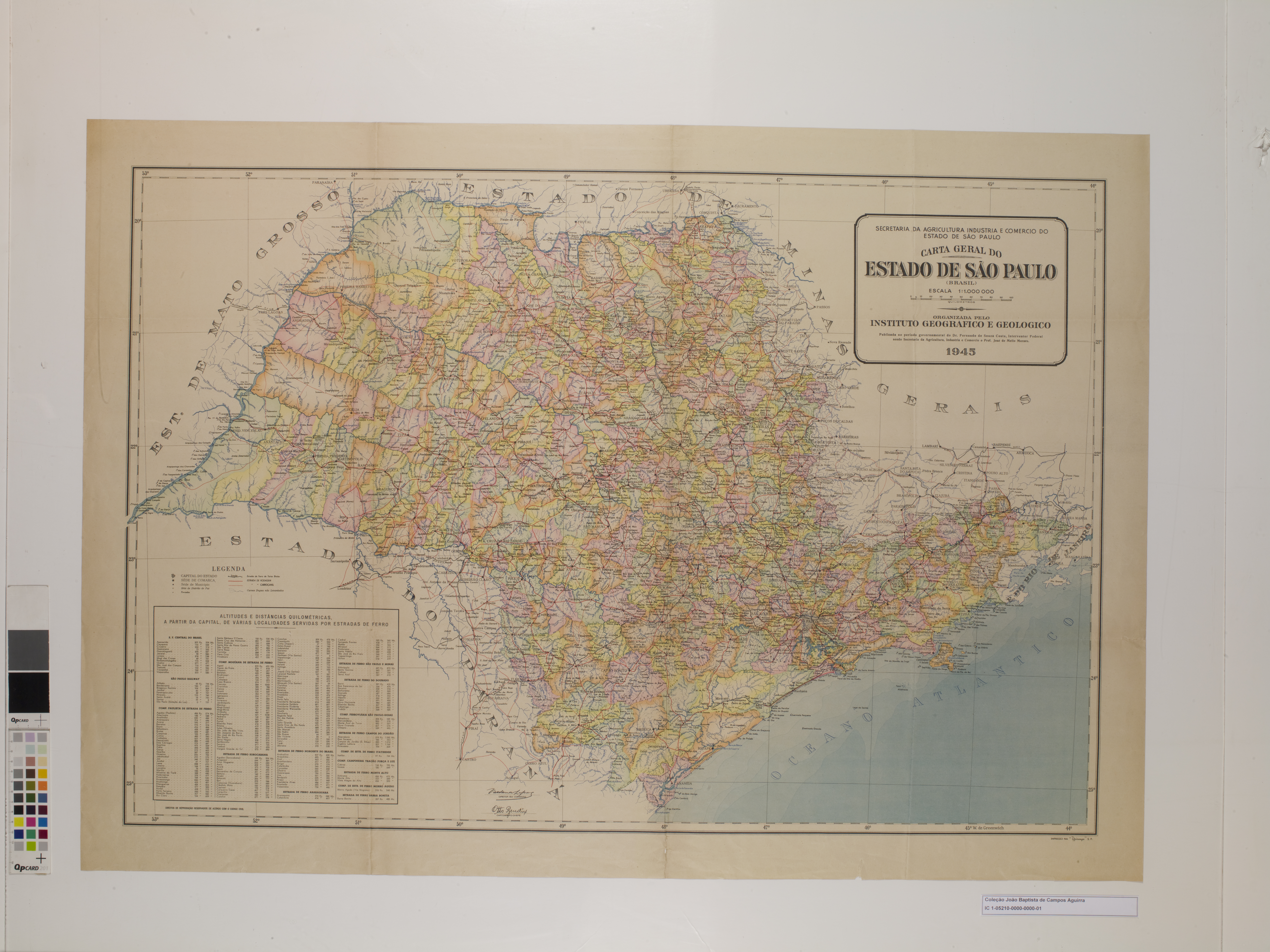
Map of the state of São Paulo (1944).

== Media ==
In telecommunications, the city was served by Telecomunicações de São Paulo. In July 1998, this company was acquired by Telefónica, which adopted the Vivo brand in 2012. The company is currently an operator of cell phones, fixed lines, internet (fiber optics/4G) and television (satellite and cable).

== See also ==
- List of municipalities in São Paulo
- Interior of São Paulo
