= Allan Gomiero =

Brazilian footballer (born 1988)

Personal information
- Full name: Allan Maxwel Borges Gomiero
- Date of birth: 15 February 1988 (age 38)
- Place of birth: Campinas, Brazil
- Position: Midfielder

Senior career*
Years	Team	Apps	(Gls)
2006–2010	Campinas		
2008	→ Lugano (loan)		
2010	→ Ituano (loan)		
2010–2012	Ituano		
2013	Treze		
2014	Capivariano		
2014	Inter de Limeira		
2015	Votuporanguense		
- * Club domestic league appearances and goals as of 16 March 2017

Allan Maxwel Borges Gomiero (born February 15, 1988, in Campinas), known as Allan Borges, Allan Gomiero or simply Allan, is a Brazilian footballer who played as midfielder.

== Career statistics ==
As of 16 March 2017

Club	Season	League			State League		Cup		Conmebol		Other		Total	
Club	Season	Division	Apps	Goals	Apps	Goals	Apps	Goals	Apps	Goals	Apps	Goals	Apps	Goals
Ituano	2010	Paulista	—		2	0	—		—		—		2	0
Ituano	2011	Paulista	—		6	1	—		—		—		6	1
Ituano	2012	Paulista	—		5	0	—		—		—		5	0
Ituano	Subtotal		—		13	1	—		—		—		13	1
Capivariano	2014	Paulista A2	—		5	0	—		—		—		5	0
Inter de Limeira	2014	Paulista A3	—		5	0	—		—		—		5	0
Votuporanguense	2014	Paulista A3	—		20	0	—		—		—		20	0
Career total			0	0	43	1	0	0	0	0	0	0	43	1
