= José Yégüez =

Venezuelan footballer (born 1987)

Personal information
- Full name: José Jesús Yégüez Salgado
- Date of birth: September 16, 1987 (age 39)
- Place of birth: Puerto La Cruz, Venezuela
- Height: 1.76 m (5 ft 9 in)
- Position: Left back

Team information
- Current team: Aragua FC

Senior career*
Years	Team	Apps	(Gls)
2005–2009	Anzoátegui	59	(5)
2010–2012	Táchira	39	(0)
2012–2014	Aragua FC	39	(0)
2014–2015	Zulia FC	17	(1)
2016	Estudiantes de Caracas	24	(1)
2017–2018	Estudiantes de Merida	38	(0)
2019–	Aragua FC	66	(5)

International career
2007	Venezuela U20	4	(0)
2008–	Venezuela	5	(0)
- * Club domestic league appearances and goals as of 28 August 2022

José Jesús Yégüez Salgado (born 16 September 1987) is a Venezuelan footballer that currently plays for Aragua FC of the Venezuelan Primera División as left back.
