= Humberlito Borges =

Brazilian footballer (born 1980)

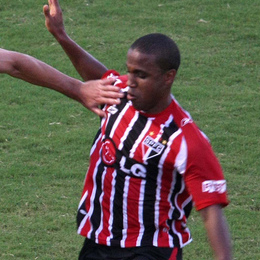
- Borges with São Paulo in 2008

Personal information
- Full name: Humberlito Borges Teixeira
- Date of birth: 5 October 1980 (age 46)
- Place of birth: Salvador, Brazil
- Height: 1.76 m (5 ft 9 in)
- Position: Striker

Senior career*
Years	Team	Apps	(Gls)
2001	Arapongas	5	(2)
2002	Inter de Bebedouro	2	(4)
2003	Jataiense	12	(6)
2004	São Caetano	6	(0)
2005	Paysandu	9	(0)
2005	União São João	18	(12)
2005	Paraná	36	(19)
2006	Vegalta Sendai	41	(26)
2007–2009	São Paulo	84	(27)
2010–2011	Grêmio	13	(3)
2011–2012	Santos	34	(23)
2012–2014	Cruzeiro	75	(28)
2015	Ponte Preta	31	(6)
2016	América Mineiro	16	(2)
Total		382	(158)

International career
2011	Brazil	1	(0)
- * Club domestic league appearances and goals

Humberlito Borges Teixeira or simply Borges (born 5 October 1980) is a Brazilian former professional footballer who played as a striker.

== Club career ==
=== União São João ===
Before coming to União São João started by clubs without much expression. He played extremely well, showing his football for the whole of Brazil, so he was hired by Paraná.

=== Jataiense ===
Borges had a brief spell in Jataiense, he pointed out a lot in Campeonato Goiano.

=== Vegalta Sendai ===
In 2006 Borges attracted the attention of Japanese team Vegalta Sendai. Whilst playing for them, he was top scorer in the J2 League for 2006.

=== São Paulo ===
After his success in Japan, Borges was hired by São Paulo in 2007. In the Campeonato Brasileiro Série A that year, he was one of three top scorers of São Paulo with 7 goals. The other two were Dagoberto and goalkeeper Rogerio Ceni. São Paulo won the Brazilian championship for the second year running.

In 2008, Borges scored 10 goals in the championship for São Paulo who won for the third year in a row. Borges scored five goals less than the top striker of the year, Alex Mineiro of Palmeiras.

On 8 November, Borges scored his first hat-trick in São Paulo's shirt. He achieved this in a match against Portuguesa at the Estádio do Canindé. This season, he scored 16 goals in the Campeonato Brasileiro Série A.

In 2009, Borges was the top scorer of São Paulo in the Copa Libertadores.

=== Grêmio ===
The player was presented by the Guild on 5 January 2010 along with Leandro, William and Maurice. The player has trained with the group and traveled with the delegation towards pre-season in the city of Bento Gonçalves, Rio Grande do Sul in the mountains. Debuted for Grêmio in the first round of the 2010 Campeonato Gaúcho in the game against Pelotas, Estádio Boca do Lobo in Pelotas. It began as the holder of the attack, along with former teammate Leandro from São Paulo. The game ended 3–2 to the Guild, and Borges scored the tie of the tricolor when the match was 2–1 to Pelotas. The other goals were Jonas (penalty) and Maylson.

At the premiere of Grêmio in Brazil Cup 2010, against the Araguaia Atlético Clube, Borges scored two goals, being decisive for the classification of the Guild to advance the next phase. His first goal in Grenal occurred on 25 April 2010, valid for the 1st game of the finals of the Gaucho, 2010. He has played a Grenal for Grêmio in the first round of the Cup Fernando Carvalho (1st round of the Gaucho ) but did not score. His goal was the second victory in the Tri 2–0 at Estádio Beira-Rio in Porto Alegre.

=== Santos ===
On 23 May 2011, the boards of Santos and Grêmio confirmed the transfer of the striker to the team from São Paulo. On his debut, Borges scored two goals in a 3–1 victory over Avai. And he scored a goal late in the game between Cruzeiro and Santos, which was won by a score of 1–0.

Having played for Grêmio previously in the tournament, Borges wasn't allowed to play the finals of the Libertadores with Santos (which ended up as champions), but he was unstoppable in the matches for the national championship, being the absolute owner Santos 9 shirt. He was Brasileirão top scorer with 23 goals in 29 games reaching the mark of Serginho Chulapa, which lasted 28 years (since 1983). He came to be compared with the Cameroonian striker Samuel Eto'o.

==== Cruzeiro ====
On his debut for Cruzeiro, Borges scored against his previous club, Santos in a competitive game in the Brasil Série A.

== Internatıonal career ==
As reward for his great form at Santos in 2011 as top scorer in the Campeonato Brasileiro Série A, Borges was called up on 22 September 2011 for the second game against Argentina in the Superclásico, South American's greatest football grudge match.

== Career statistics ==
Appearances and goals by club, season and competition
Club	Season	League			Cup (Note: Includes Emperor's Cup.)		Total	
Club	Season	Division	Apps	Goals	Apps	Goals	Apps	Goals
Vegalta Sendai	2006	J2 League	41	26	2	1	43	27
Santos	2011	Série A	31	23	0	0	31	23
Total			48	32	2	1	50	33

== Honours ==
São Paulo

- Campeonato Brasileiro Série A: 2007, 2008

Grêmio

- Campeonato Gaúcho: 2010

Santos

- Campeonato Paulista: 2012

Cruzeiro

- Campeonato Brasileiro Série A: 2013, 2014
- Campeonato Mineiro: 2014

América Mineiro

- Campeonato Mineiro: 2016

Brazil

- Superclásico de las Américas: 2011

Individual

- J2 League top scorer: 2006
- Campeonato Brasileiro Série A Top scorer: 2011
