= Agenor (footballer, born 1981) =

Brazilian footballer (1981–2019)

Personal information
- Full name: Agenor Figueiredo Santos
- Date of birth: 7 August 1981
- Place of birth: Rio de Janeiro, Brazil
- Date of death: October 2019 (aged 38)
- Height: 1.79 m (5 ft 10 1/2 in)
- Position: Defensive midfielder

Youth career
- Brasília

Senior career*
Years	Team	Apps	(Gls)
2001–2003	Brasília		
2003–2004	Gama		
2005	Paranoá		
2006–2011	Brasiliense		
2008–2009	→ Paraná (loan)	3	(0)
2009–2011	→ Atlético Goianiense (loan)	71	(4)
2012	Ponte Preta	4	(0)
2012–2013	América Mineiro	23	(1)
2013	Rio Verde	14	(2)
2013	Nacional	4	(1)
2014	Esportivo	7	(0)
2014–2015	Vila Nova	3	(0)
2015–2016	Rio Branco		
2016–?	Santo André	0	(0)
- * Club domestic league appearances and goals as of 7 February 2016

Agenor Figueiredo Santos (7 August 1981 – October 2019), commonly known as Agenor, was professional football defensive midfielder who plays for Brazilian side Santo André. He died in October 2019 as victim of a traffic accident.

== Career ==
Agenor has played for Brasiliense Futebol Clube in the Copa do Brasil.

== Contract ==
- Brasiliense.
