= Romano (footballer) =

Brazilian footballer

Personal information
- Full name: Romano Rodrigues
- Date of birth: November 10, 1987 (age 39)
- Place of birth: Taquara, Brazil
- Height: 1.78 m (5 ft 10 in)
- Position: Left back

Team information
- Current team: Veranópolis

Youth career
- Juventude

Senior career*
Years	Team	Apps	(Gls)
2008	Esportivo	?	(?)
2008	Ulbra	?	(?)
2009–2010	Veranópolis	32	(4)
2010–2012	Portuguesa	9	(0)
2011	→ Avaí (loan)	17	(0)
2012	→ Ceará (loan)	6	(0)
2012	Joinville	10	(0)
2013	Juventude	4	(0)
2014	Veranópolis	15	(3)
2014	ASA	3	(0)
2015–2016	San Marcos	2	(0)
2016	São Paulo-RS	12	(0)
2016–2017	Boa Esporte	19	(0)
2017	ABC	0	(0)
2018–	Veranópolis	0	(0)
- * Club domestic league appearances and goals as of June 1, 2014

Romano Rodrigues (born November 10, 1987) is a Brazilian footballer who plays for San Marcos de Arica, as a left back for Veranópolis.

== Career ==
Romano started his career at Esportivo. The player also had spells at some Rio Grande do Sul clubs, mostly recognized at Veranópolis (2009/10). After his spell at Veranópolis, Romano signed with Portuguesa. After a successful half-season with Lusa, Romano was loaned to Série A club Avaí, in a one-year deal. On 4 January 2012, Romano signed a one-year deal with newly relegated Série B outfit Ceará and in May, moved to Joinville on a loan deal.

=== Career statistics ===
(Correct as of 30 October 2011)

Club	Season	State League		Brazilian Série A		Copa do Brasil		Copa Sudamericana		Total	
Club	Season	Apps	Goals	Apps	Goals	Apps	Goals	Apps	Goals	Apps	Goals
Avaí	2011	7	0	17	0	3	0	-	-	27	0
Total		7	0	17	0	3	0	0	0	27	0
