= Durval =

Brazilian footballer (born 1980)

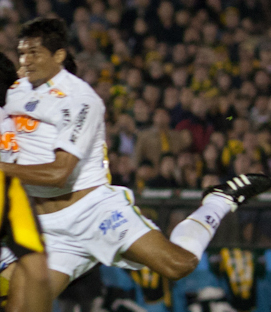
- Durval in action with Santos in the first leg of the 2011 Copa Libertadores finals

Personal information
- Full name: Severino dos Ramos Durval da Silva
- Date of birth: 11 July 1980 (age 46)
- Place of birth: Cruz do Espírito Santo, Brazil
- Height: 1.85 m (6 ft 1 in)
- Position: Centre-back

Youth career
- 1995–1998: Confiança de Sapé

Senior career*
Years	Team	Apps	(Gls)
1999	Confiança de Sapé		
1999–2001	Unibol		
2002–2003	Botafogo-PB		
2004	Brasiliense	22	(1)
2005–2006	Atlético Paranaense	23	(1)
2006	→ Sport Recife (loan)	52	(3)
2007–2009	Sport Recife	149	(19)
2010–2013	Santos	195	(6)
2014–2019	Sport Recife	172	(5)
Total		613	(35)

International career
2012	Brazil	1	(0)
- * Club domestic league appearances and goals

Severino dos Ramos Durval da Silva (born 11 July 1980), known as Durval, is a Brazilian retired footballer who played as a centre-back.

== Club career ==
=== Early career ===
Born in Cruz do Espírito Santo, Paraíba, Durval began his career playing as a midfielder for amateur side Flamengo de São Felipe. Known as Pedrão at the time, he caught the eye of local scouts and was invited to join Confiança de Sapé in 1995, and he would make his first team debut in the 1999 Campeonato Paraibano.

Shortly after making his senior debut, where he would play some matches as a centre-back due to squad shortage, Durval moved to Unibol to play in the 1999 Série C, returning to the midfield position and adopting his current nickname. He returned to his native state in 2002, signing for Botafogo-PB; initially used as a left-back, he established himself as a starter in the centre-back position in the following year, as his side narrowly missed out promotion from the Série C and won the 2003 Paraibano, his first state league title.

Ahead of the 2004 season, Durval moved to Brasiliense, helping the side to win the year's Campeonato Brasiliense and the 2004 Série B. In the latter tournament, he scored the winner in a 1–0 away win over Fortaleza which assured the team's first-ever promotion to the Série A.

=== Atlético Paranaense ===
On 1 January 2005, Atlético Paranaense sign Durval from Brasiliense. Initially a backup option, he established himself as a starter and made his top tier debut on 24 April, starting in a 1–0 home loss to Ponte Preta.

Durval was a regular starter of Atlético in their 2005 Copa Libertadores run, but saw his playing time grow limited after the finals of the competition, where he scored an own goal in the first leg and was criticised for his performance in the second leg. On 4 December 2005, he confirmed his departure from the club.

=== Sport Recife ===
Ahead of the 2006 season, Durval was loaned to Sport Recife in the second division. He immediately established himself as a starter, helping in their top tier promotion at the end of his first season and winning the year's Campeonato Pernambucano.

Durval signed a permanent deal with Sport for the 2007 campaign, and became an important unit of the club in the following years, winning another three Pernambucano titles, aside from lifting the 2008 Copa do Brasil. In December 2009, he was close to a move to Portuguese side Benfica, but the deal later collapsed.

=== Santos ===
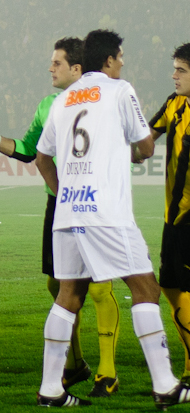
Durval with Santos in the first leg of the 2010 Copa Libertadores finals

On 6 January 2010, Durval signed a two-year contract with Santos. He established a partnership with Edu Dracena in the starting eleven, and helped the club to win the 2010 Campeonato Paulista and the 2010 Copa do Brasil in his first season.

In 2011, Durval won another Paulistão and helped the side to win the 2011 Copa Libertadores; after being named man of the match in the first leg of the finals, he scored an own goal in the second leg. On 3 December 2011, he renewed his contract until December 2013.

Still a first-choice in the following two years, where he won another two Paulista titles and the 2012 Recopa Sudamericana, Durval lost his starting spot to youth graduate Gustavo Henrique midway through the 2013 campaign.

=== Return to Sport Recife ===
On 8 January 2014, Durval returned to Sport on a two-year deal. He won his 11th state league title with the club in April, scoring the winner in a 1–0 away success over Náutico in the second leg of the finals.

An undisputed starter in the following years, Durval renewed his link for a further year on 5 January 2018. He agreed to a one-year extension on 1 February 2019, but was unable to play during that season after sustaining a knee injury.

On 20 January 2020, Durval confirmed his retirement from professional football at the age of 39.

== International career ==
On 13 November 2012, Durval was called up to the Brazil national team by head coach Mano Menezes for the year's Superclásico de las Américas against Argentina, as both sides only called up local players. He made his full international debut eight days later, starting in a 2–1 loss in the second leg at the La Bombonera.

== Career statistics ==
=== Club ===
Appearances and goals by club, season and competition
Club	Season	League			State League (Note: Includes Campeonato Brasiliense, Campeonato Paranaense, Campeonato Pernambucano, Campeonato Paulista)		Cup (Note: Includes Copa do Brasil)		Continental		Other		Total	
Club	Season	Division	Apps	Goals	Apps	Goals	Apps	Goals	Apps	Goals	Apps	Goals	Apps	Goals
Brasiliense	2004	Série B	16	1	6	0	1	0	—		—		23	1
Atlético Paranaense	2005	Série A	15	0	8	1	—		8 (Note: Appearance(s) in Copa Libertadores)	0	—		31	1
Sport Recife	2006	Série B	33	1	19	2	—		—		—		52	3
Sport Recife	2007	Série A	35	3	15	0	5	0	—		—		55	3
Sport Recife	2008	Série A	32	8	20	3	11	3	—		—		63	14
Sport Recife	2009	Série A	31	2	16	3	—		8	0	—		55	5
Sport Recife	Total		131	14	70	8	16	3	8	0	—		225	25
Santos	2010	Série A	34	2	20	1	10	0	2 (Note: Appearance(s) in Copa Sudamericana)	0	—		66	3
Santos	2011	Série A	31	0	19	0	—		14	0	2 (Note: Appearance(s) in FIFA Club World Cup)	0	66	0
Santos	2012	Série A	33	1	16	1	—		12	0	2 (Note: Appearance(s) in Recopa Sudamericana)	0	63	2
Santos	2013	Série A	20	0	22	1	8	1	—		—		50	2
Santos	Total		118	3	77	3	18	1	28	0	4	0	245	7
Sport Recife	2014	Série A	35	1	12	1	—		2	0	9 (Note: Appearance(s) in Copa do Nordeste)	0	58	2
Sport Recife	2015	Série A	36	0	12	1	5	0	4	0	10	0	67	1
Sport Recife	2016	Série A	20	1	13	1	0	0	1	0	7	1	41	3
Sport Recife	2017	Série A	23	0	8	0	8	1	6	0	12	1	57	2
Sport Recife	2018	Série A	9	0	4	0	0	0	—		—		13	0
Sport Recife	Total		123	2	49	3	13	1	13	0	38	2	236	8
Career total			403	20	210	15	48	5	57	0	42	2	760	42

=== International ===
Appearances and goals by national team and year
National team	Year	Apps	Goals
Brazil	2012	1	0
Total		1	0

== Honours ==
Botafogo-PB

- Campeonato Paraibano: 2003

Brasiliense

- Campeonato Brasiliense: 2004

Atlético Paranaense

- Campeonato Paranaense: 2005

Sport

- Campeonato Pernambucano: 2006, 2007, 2008, 2009, 2014
- Copa do Brasil: 2008
- Copa do Nordeste: 2014

Santos

- Campeonato Paulista: 2010, 2011, 2012
- Copa do Brasil: 2010
- Copa Libertadores: 2011
- Recopa Sudamericana: 2012
