= Raul (footballer, born 1986) =

Brazilian footballer

Personal information
- Full name: Raul Ferreira dos Anjos
- Date of birth: 31 October 1986 (age 40)
- Place of birth: São Bernardo do Campo, Brazil
- Height: 1.77 m (5 ft 9 1/2 in)
- Position: Forward

Senior career*
Years	Team	Apps	(Gls)
2006–2013	São Bernardo	0	(0)
2011	→ Santo André (loan)	5	(1)
2011	→ Boa Esporte (loan)	1	(1)
2012	→ Juventude (loan)	2	(0)
2013	→ Ferroviária (loan)	0	(0)
2014–2015	Red Bull Brasil	3	(0)
2016	Campinense	2	(0)
2016–2017	América de Natal	3	(1)
2018	Portuguesa	13	(4)
2018	Linense	5	(0)
2018	Portuguesa	0	(0)
2019	Linense	10	(2)
2019	Ferroviária	2	(0)
2020–2021	EC São Bernardo	14	(3)
- * Club domestic league appearances and goals

Raul Ferreira dos Anjos (born 31 October 1986), known as Raul, is a Brazilian retired footballer who played as forward.

== Career statistics ==
As of 23 June 2018

Club	Season	League			State League		Cup		Continental		Other		Total	
Club	Season	Division	Apps	Goals	Apps	Goals	Apps	Goals	Apps	Goals	Apps	Goals	Apps	Goals
São Bernardo	2010	Paulista A2	—		19	3	—		—		—		19	3
São Bernardo	2011	Paulista	—		11	1	—		—		—		11	1
São Bernardo	2012	Paulista A2	—		14	3	—		—		—		14	3
São Bernardo	2013	Paulista	—		—		2	0	—		15 (Note: All appearance(s) in Copa Paulista)	0	17	0
São Bernardo	Subtotal		—		44	7	2	0	—		15	0	61	7
Santo André	2011	Série C	5	1	—		—		—		—		5	1
Boa Esporte	2011	Série C	1	1	—		—		—		—		1	1
Juventude	2012	Série D	2	0	—		—		—		—		2	0
Ferroviária	2013	Paulista A2	—		10	1	—		—		—		10	1
Red Bull Brasil	2014	Paulista A2	—		19	5	—		—		17	5	36	10
Red Bull Brasil	2015	Série D	3	0	13	0	—		—		—		16	0
Red Bull Brasil	Subtotal		3	0	32	5	—		—		17	5	52	10
Campinense	2016	Série D	2	0	10	2	1	0	—		9 (Note: All appearance(s) in Copa do Nordeste)	0	22	2
América–RN	2016	Série C	3	1	—		—		—		—		3	1
América–RN	2017	Série D	0	0	6	1	1	0	—		4	0	10	1
América–RN	Subtotal		3	1	6	1	1	0	—		4	0	14	2
Portuguesa	2018	Paulista A2	—		13	4	—		—		0	0	13	4
Linense	2018	Série D	5	0	—		—		—		—		5	0
Career total			23	3	115	20	4	0	0	0	45	5	185	28
