= Gustavo Bastos =

Brazilian footballer (born 1983)

Personal information
- Full name: Gustavo Nascimento Bastos
- Date of birth: 15 July 1983 (age 43)
- Place of birth: Pelotas, Brazil
- Height: 1.91 m (6 ft 3 in)
- Position: Centre back

Senior career*
Years	Team	Apps	(Gls)
2004	Pelotas		
2005–2007	Brasil de Farroupilha		
2007	Iguaçu		
2009	União Mogi		
2009	Flamengo de Guarulhos		
2010	Guaratinguetá	58	(2)
2011	Mirassol	17	(4)
2011	Avaí	19	(2)
2012	Botafogo-SP	7	(1)
2013	Comercial-SP	9	(0)
2013	Cuiabá	17	(1)
2014	Guarani-SP	14	(2)
2015	Vila Nova	19	(1)
2016	ABC	24	(0)
2017	Atlético Tubarão	9	(0)
2018	Brasil de Pelotas	2	(0)
2019	Goianésia EC	11	(0)
2019	Anapolina	2	(0)
2020	São Gabriel	3	(0)
- * Club domestic league appearances and goals as of 18:58, 13 May 2021 (UTC)

Gustavo Nascimento Bastos (born 15 July 1983), or simply Gustavo Bastos, is a Brazilian footballer who played as a centre back.

== Career ==
After a good performance in the Campeonato Paulista with Mirassol, Gustavo Bastos was hired by Brasileiro Série A side Avaí in May 2011.
