= Éder Lima (footballer, born 1986) =

Brazilian footballer

Personal information
- Full name: Éder Lima dos Santos
- Date of birth: 5 February 1986 (age 40)
- Place of birth: São Vicente, Brazil
- Height: 1.87 m (6 ft 2 in)
- Positions: Centre back; left back

Team information
- Current team: Ferroviário

Youth career
- Portuguesa

Senior career*
Years	Team	Apps	(Gls)
2007	São Vicente		
2007	CENE		
2008	São José-SP		
2009	Atlético Sorocaba		
2009–2010	Noroeste	13	(0)
2010–2011	Vila Nova	42	(0)
2011	Santos	6	(0)
2012–2013	Oeste	17	(0)
2013–2014	Tianjin Teda	57	(3)
2015	Beijing Enterprises Group	16	(1)
2015–2016	Bragantino	56	(1)
2016	América Mineiro	12	(1)
2017–2019	Ventforet Kofu	108	(3)
2021	River-PI	4	(0)
2021–2022	Sampaio Corrêa	14	(0)
2022–	Ferroviário	50	(1)
- * Club domestic league appearances and goals as of 16 September 2023

Éder Lima dos Santos (born 5 February 1986), known as Éder Lima (エデル・リマ), is a Brazilian footballer who plays as a central defender or left back for Ferroviário.

== Career ==
Born in São Vicente, São Paulo, Éder played for Portuguesa's youth categories, but made his professional debuts with hometown's São Vicente Atlético Clube.

He then played for CENE, São José-SP, Atlético Sorocaba.

=== Noroeste ===
In November 2009, Éder signed with Noroeste. He played 13 matches and was eventually promoted with the club (to Série A-1).

=== Vila Nova ===
In May 2010, he was transferred to Vila Nova.

=== Santos ===
On 6 September 2011, Éder signed with Campeonato Brasileiro Série A giants Santos, with a contract during until 31 December.

On the following day, he made his debut on Santos, against Avaí, playing the last 4 minutes after coming off the bench to replace Elano.

After six games with Peixe, he was released, and signed with Oeste to the following year.

=== Al-Merrikh ===
At 2012, he has joined Sudan Premier League Al-Merrikh(Omdurman).

=== Tianjin Teda ===
At 2 February 2013, he has joined Chinese Super League side Tianjin Teda.

=== Beijing Enterprises Group ===
On 11 February 2015, Lima transferred to China League One side Beijing Enterprises Group.

== Club statistics ==
Updated to end of 2023 season.

Appearances and goals by club, season and competition
Club	Season	League			State League		Cup		League Cup		Other		Total	
Club	Season	Division	Apps	Goals	Apps	Goals	Apps	Goals	Apps	Goals	Apps	Goals	Apps	Goals
Noroeste	2010	Paulista A2	—		13	0	—		—		—		13	0
Vila Nova	2010	Série B	25	0	—		—		—		—		25	0
Vila Nova	2011	Série B	17	0	19	0	—		—		—		36	0
Vila Nova	Total		42	0	19	0	—		—		—		61	0
Santos	2011	Série A	6	0	—		—		—		—		6	0
Oeste	2012	Série C	—		17	0	—		—		—		17	0
Tianjin Teda	2013	Chinese Super League	28	1	—		1	0	—		—		29	1
Tianjin Teda	2014	Chinese Super League	29	2	—		1	0	—		—		30	2
Tianjin Teda	Total		57	3	—		2	0	—		—		59	3
Beijing Enterprises Group	2015	China League One	16	1	—		0	0	—		—		16	1
Bragantino	2015	Série B	13	0	—		—		—		—		13	0
Bragantino	2016	Série B	18	0	20	0	5	1	—		—		43	1
Bragantino	Total		31	0	20	0	5	1	—		—		56	1
América Mineiro	2016	Série A	12	1	—		5	1	—		—		17	2
Ventforet Kofu	2017	J1 League	31	1	—		0	0	1	0	—		32	1
Ventforet Kofu	2018	J2 League	35	1	—		1	0	2	0	—		38	1
Ventforet Kofu	2019	J2 League	37	1	—		0	0	—		1	0	38	1
Ventforet Kofu	Total		103	3	—		1	0	3	0	1	0	108	3
River-PI	2021	Piauiense	—		4	0	—		—		—		4	0
Sampaio Corrêa	2021	Série B	14	0	—		—		—		—		14	0
Ferroviário	2022	Série C	8	0	12	0	1	0	—		—		21	0
Ferroviário	2023	Série D	22	1	8	0	2	0	—		9	0	41	1
Ferroviário	Total		30	1	20	0	3	0	—		9	0	62	1
Total			311	9	93	0	16	2	3	0	10	0	433	11
