= Rychely =

Brazilian footballer

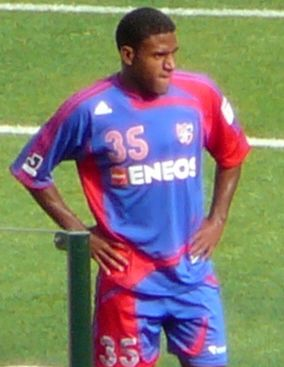

Personal information
- Full name: Rychely Cantanhede de Oliveira
- Date of birth: 6 August 1987 (age 39)
- Place of birth: Santa Luzia, Brazil
- Height: 1.73 m (5 ft 8 in)
- Position: Forward

Team information
- Current team: Operário-MS

Youth career
- 2005: Nacional (PR)

Senior career*
Years	Team	Apps	(Gls)
2005–2007	FC Tokyo	25	(2)
2008	Montedio Yamagata	16	(3)
2009	Bahia	11	(1)
2009	Győri ETO		
2010	América (SP)	6	(5)
2010–2011	Santo André	41	(7)
2011	→ Santos (loan)	7	(2)
2011	Vitória	2	(0)
2012	Paulista	18	(5)
2012–2015	Goiás	19	(2)
2013	→ Ceará (loan)	9	(0)
2014	→ Chapecoense (loan)	2	(0)
2015	→ Red Bull Brasil (loan)	1	(0)
2015	Mirassol	0	(0)
2016	Aparecidense	5	(0)
2016	Aparecida EC		
2017	Taubaté	13	(1)
2017	Anápolis	5	(0)
2018	Patrocinense	2	(0)
2019	Paracatu	14	(3)
2020–	Operário-MS	7	(1)
- * Club domestic league appearances and goals as of 21:57, 21 December 2020 (UTC)

Rychely Cantanhede de Oliveira (born 6 August 1987), known as just Rychely, is a Brazilian footballer who plays for Operário-MS.

== Biography ==
Born in Santa Luzia, Maranhão, Rychely started his career with Nacional Atlético Clube Sociedade Civil Ltda. of Paraná state. In mid-2005 he was signed by Japanese side FC Tokyo. Rychely made his senior debut in the next season, and in January 2008 loaned to Montedio Yamagata of J. League Division 2.

Rychely returned to Brazilian January 2009 and went to Hungary in September. In January 2010 he returned to Brazil again and was signed by teams from São Paulo state.

On 2 May 2011, Rychely signed a one-year contract with Brazilian giant Santos FC.

== Club statistics ==
Club	Season	State League		National League		Cup		Continental Cup		Other Cup		Total	
Club	Season	Apps	Goals	Apps	Goals	Apps	Goals	Apps	Goals	Apps	Goals	Apps	Goals
FC Tokyo	2005	-	-	0	0	-	-	-	-	-	-	0	0
FC Tokyo	2006	-	-	9	1	-	-	-	-	-	-	9	1
FC Tokyo	2007	-	-	16	1	-	-	-	-	4	0	20	1
Total		-	-	25	2	-	-	-	-	4	0	29	2
Montedio Yamagata	2008	-	-	16	3	1	0	-	-	-	-	17	3
Total		-	-	16	3	1	0	-	-	-	-	17	3
Bahia	2009	11	1	1	0	-	-	-	-	-	-	12	1
Total		11	1	1	0	-	-	-	-	-	-	12	1
Gyõri ETO FC	2009–10	-	-	0	0	-	-	-	-	-	-	0	0
Total		-	-	0	0	-	-	-	-	-	-	0	0
América-SP	2010	6	5	-	-	-	-	-	-	-	-	6	5
Total		6	5	-	-	-	-	-	-	-	-	6	5
Santo André	2010	-	-	25	4	-	-	-	-	-	-	25	4
Santo André	2011	16	3	-	-	5	0	-	-	-	-	21	3
Total		16	3	25	4	5	0	-	-	-	-	46	7
Santos	2011	1	0	-	-	-	-	-	-	-	-	1	0
Total		1	0	-	-	-	-	-	-	-	-	1	0
