= List of Santos FC players =

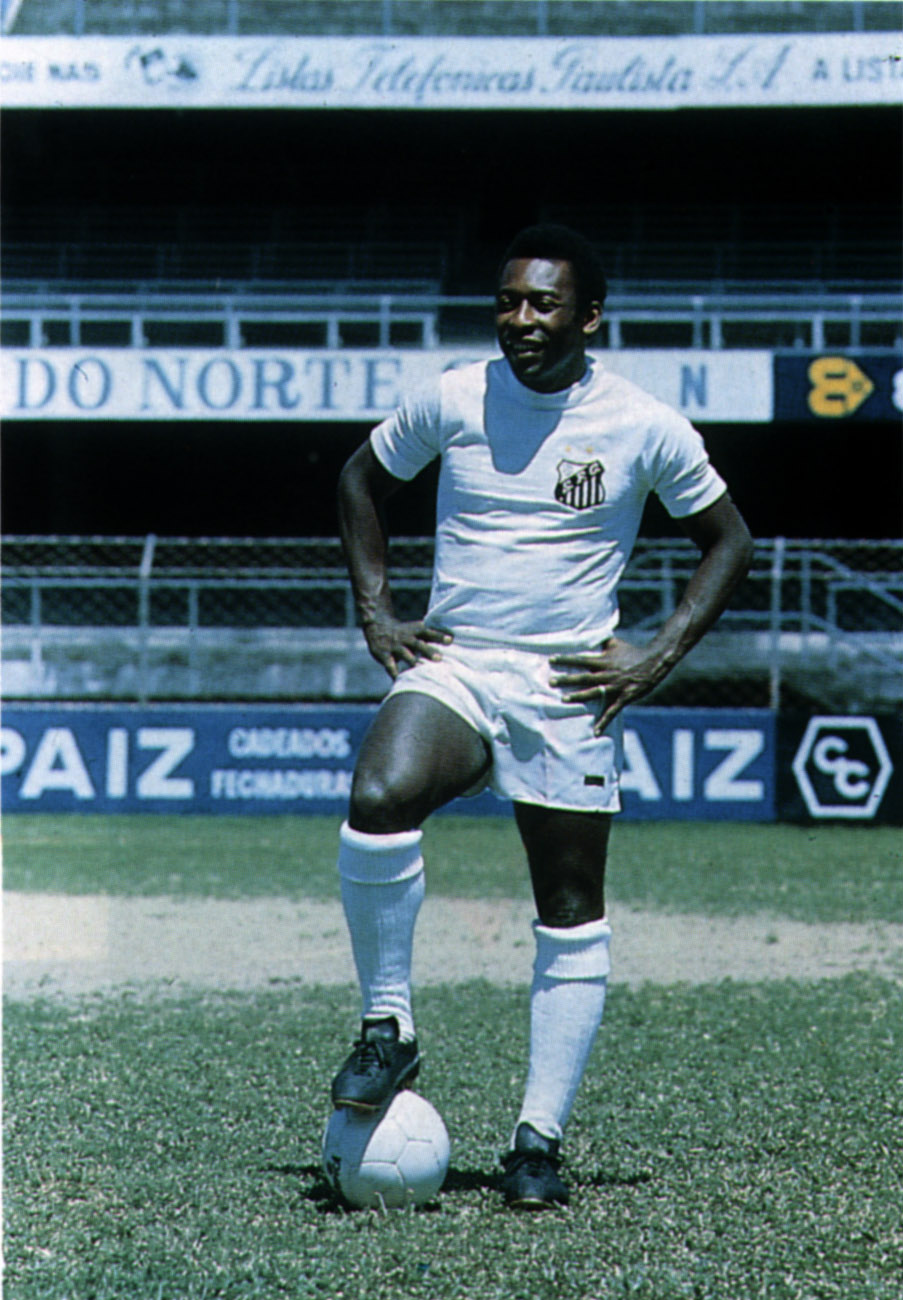
Pelé has a record 1106 appearances and a record 1098 goals with Santos.

Santos Futebol Clube is a football club based in Santos, that competes in the Campeonato Paulista, São Paulo's state league, and the Campeonato Brasileiro Série A or Brasileirão, Brazil's national league. The club was founded in 1912 by the initiative of three sports enthusiasts from Santos by the names of Raimundo Marques, Mário Ferraz de Campos, and Argemiro de Souza Júnior, and played its first friendly match on June 23, 1912. Initially Santos played against other local clubs in the city and state championships, but in 1959 the club became one of the founding members of the Taça Brasil, Brazil's first truly national league. As of 2010, Santos is one of only five clubs never to have been relegated from the top level of Brazilian football, the others being São Paulo, Flamengo, Internacional and Cruzeiro.

Santos enjoyed a successful start in the Brasileirão, finishing runners-up in the competition's first season. In the period from 1956 to 1974, the "Peixe" team won the Brasileirão six times, including a record-consecutive five titles from 1961 to 1965, and the Campeonato Paulista 11 times. The club did not win the league again until 2002. In 1978 Santos had finished 23rd, which remains, as of 2010, the club's lowest finishing position. Santos became the first club in the world to win the continental treble during the 1962 season consisting of the Paulista, Taça Brasil, and the Copa Libertadores. In 1955, Lula was appointed manager and assembled what would later be known as the Os Santásticos. In 1961 he led the club to its first league title and repeated the feat the following four seasons when the club also won the Copa Libertadores for the first time and successfully defended the trophy once.

Santos has employed several famous players, with eleven FIFA World Cup, six Copa América and one FIFA Confederations Cup winners among the previous and current Santos players. Arnaldo da Silveira was the first Santista player to participate with the national team during the 1916 Copa América. Araken Patusca was the first player from the club to participate with Brazil at a World Cup in 1930. The first Peixe to participate with the national team at the Confederations Cup was Léo at the 2001 FIFA Confederations Cup.

Pelé was voted South American footballer of the year in 1973, won the FIFA World Cup Best Young Player award in 1958 and FIFA World Cup Golden Ball in 1970. Pepe is considered one of the greatest wingers of all time and the player who won the most Brasileirãos with seven titles in total. He has also won the most Campeonato Paulistas with 13 titles in total and the only player to spend his entire player career with Santos. Coutinho, considered one of the greatest forwards in the sport, was the top scorer during Santos' victorious campaign during the 1962 Copa Libertadores and scored Santos' 5000th goal in a 10–2 rout of Guarani in 1961.

== Key ==
≈	Club record holder
¤	Played their entire career at Santos
**Name in bold**	Currently playing for Santos

== List of players ==
As of 31 December 2025.This list contains all players who have made at least one appearance for the club.

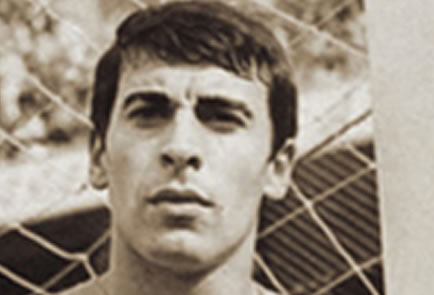
Agustín Cejas

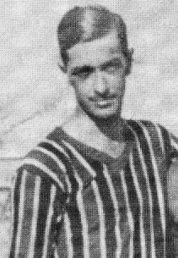
Araken Patusca

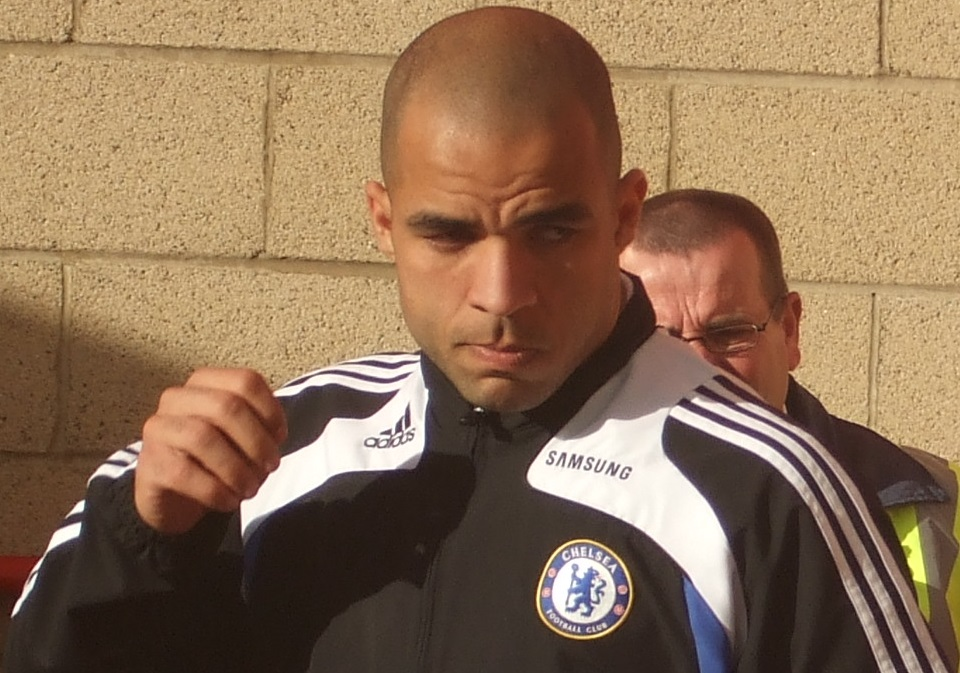
Alex

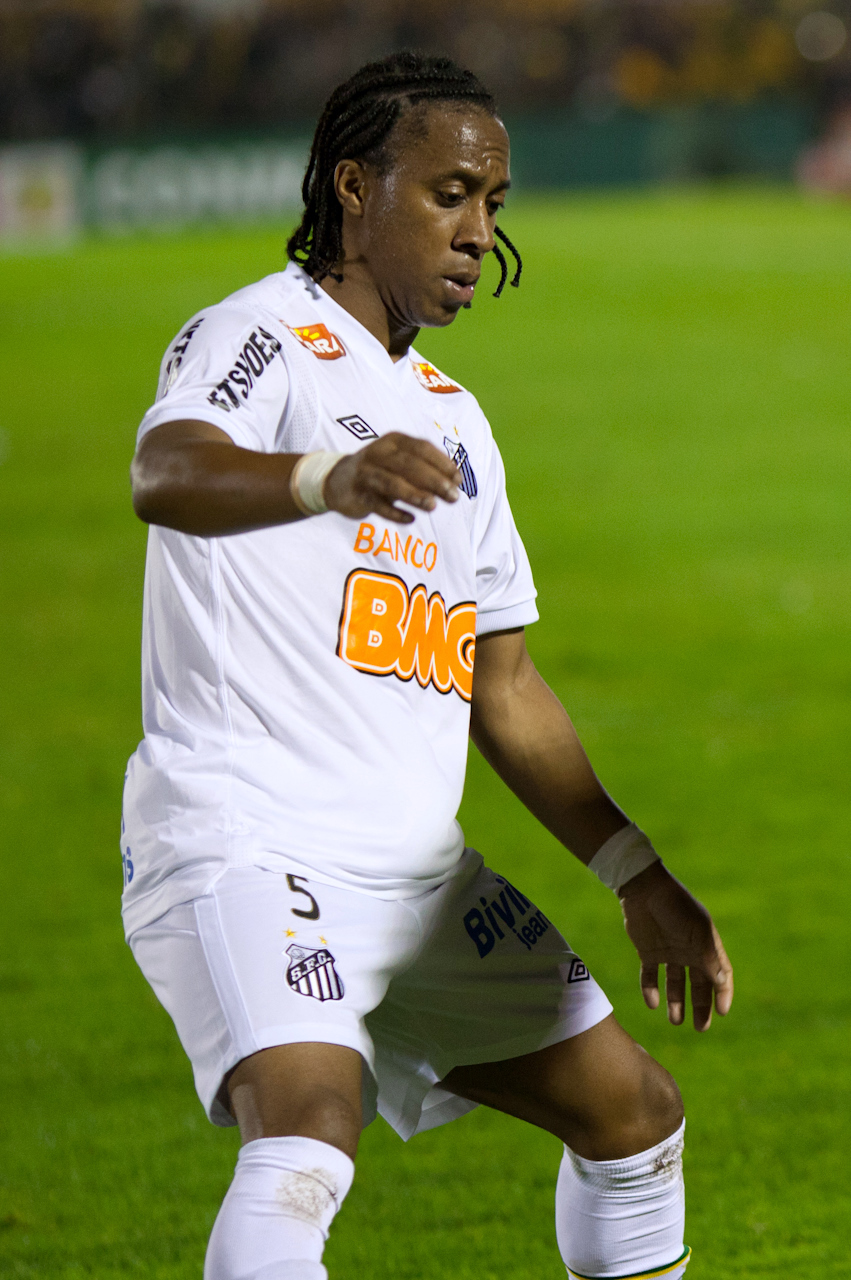
Arouca

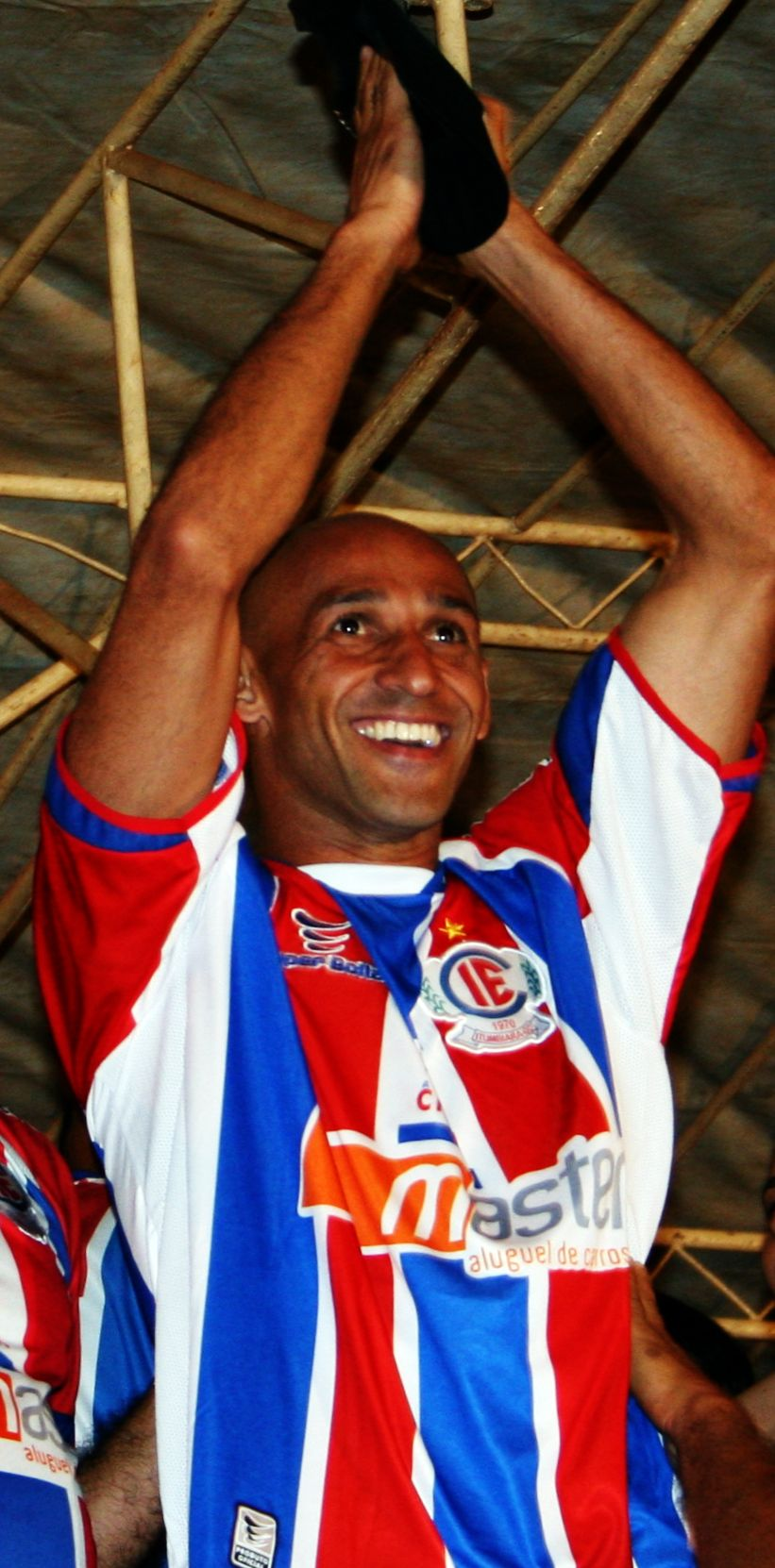
Basílio

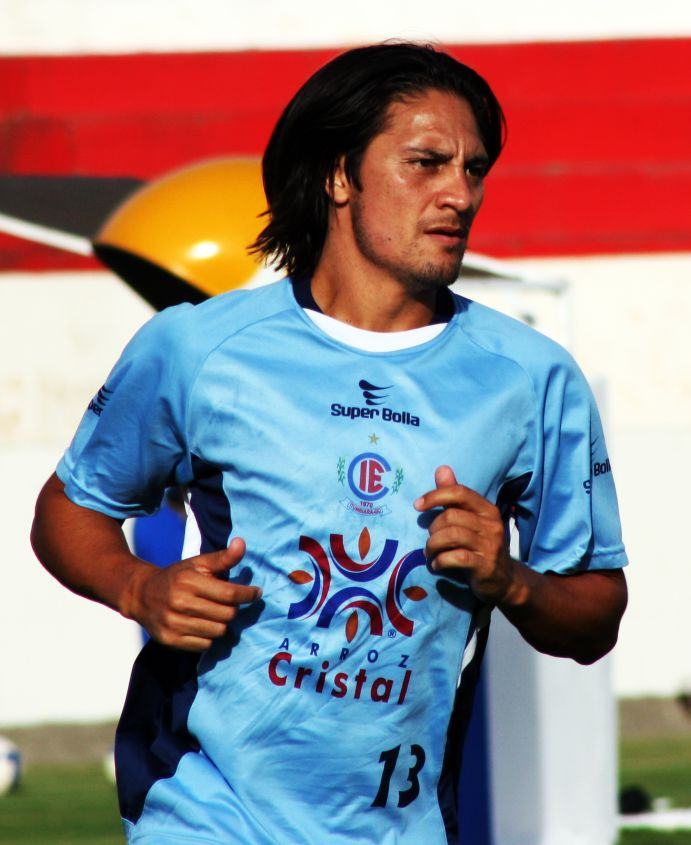
Ávalos

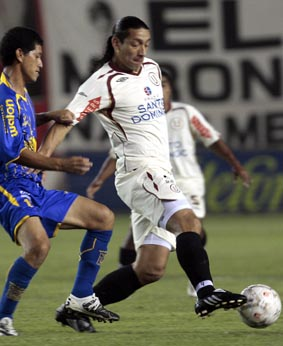
Carlos Galván

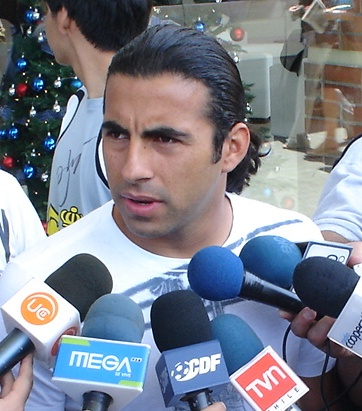
Claudio Maldonado

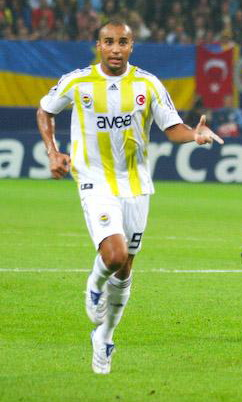
Deivid

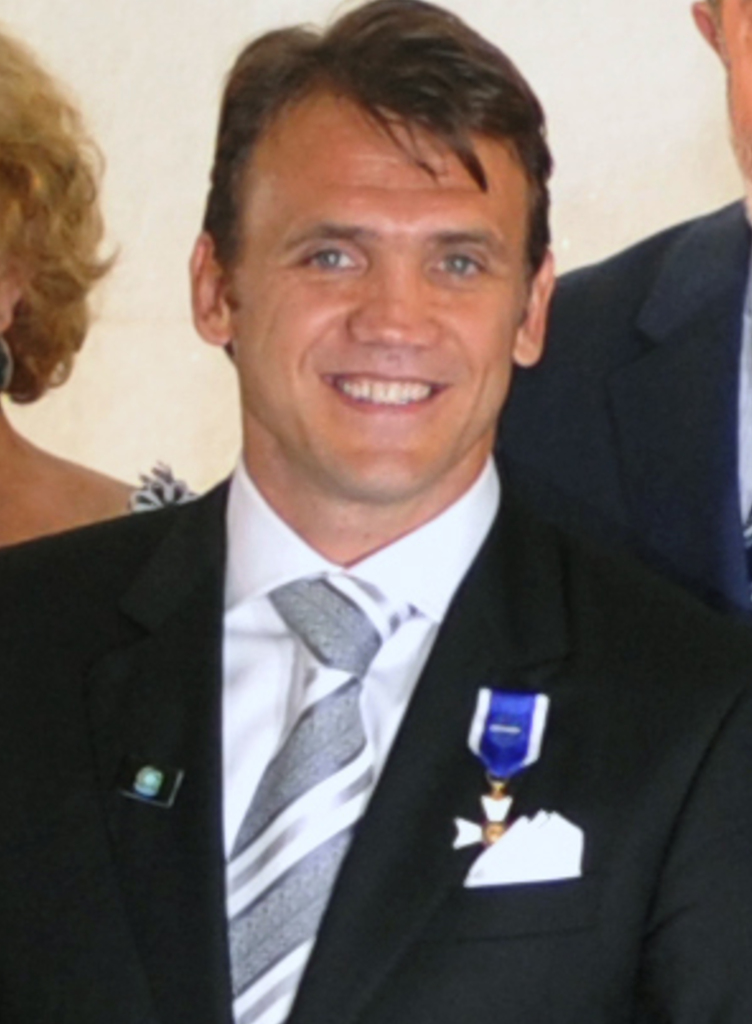
Dejan Petković

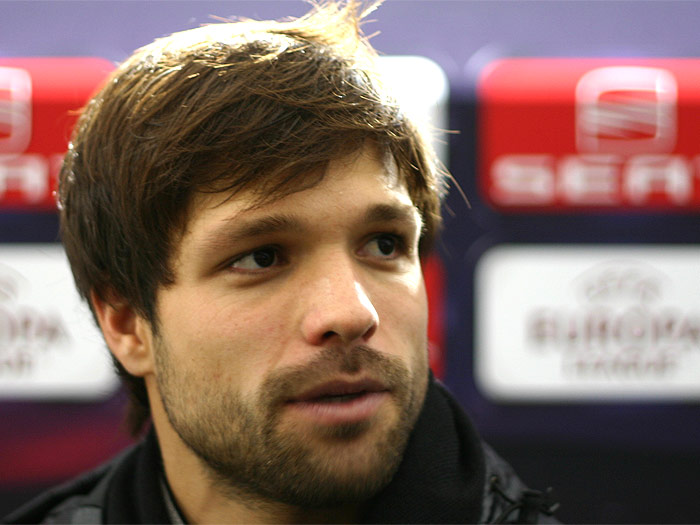
Diego

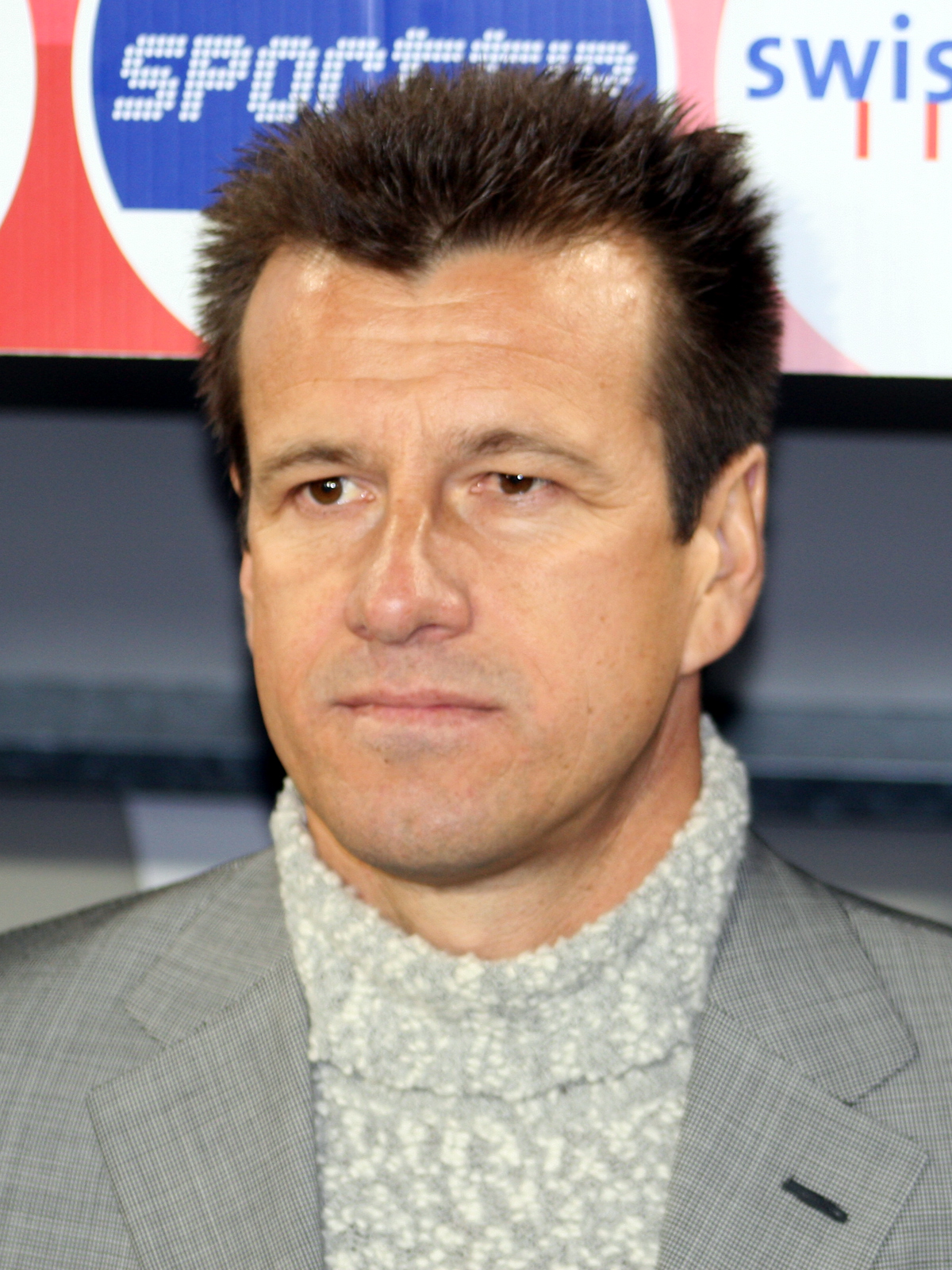
Dunga

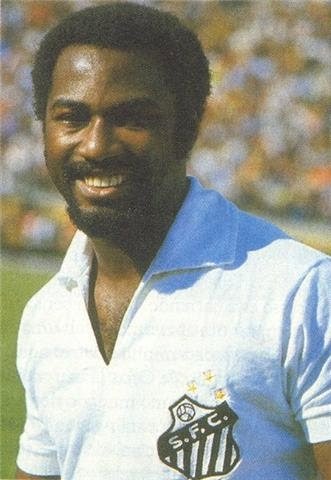
Edu

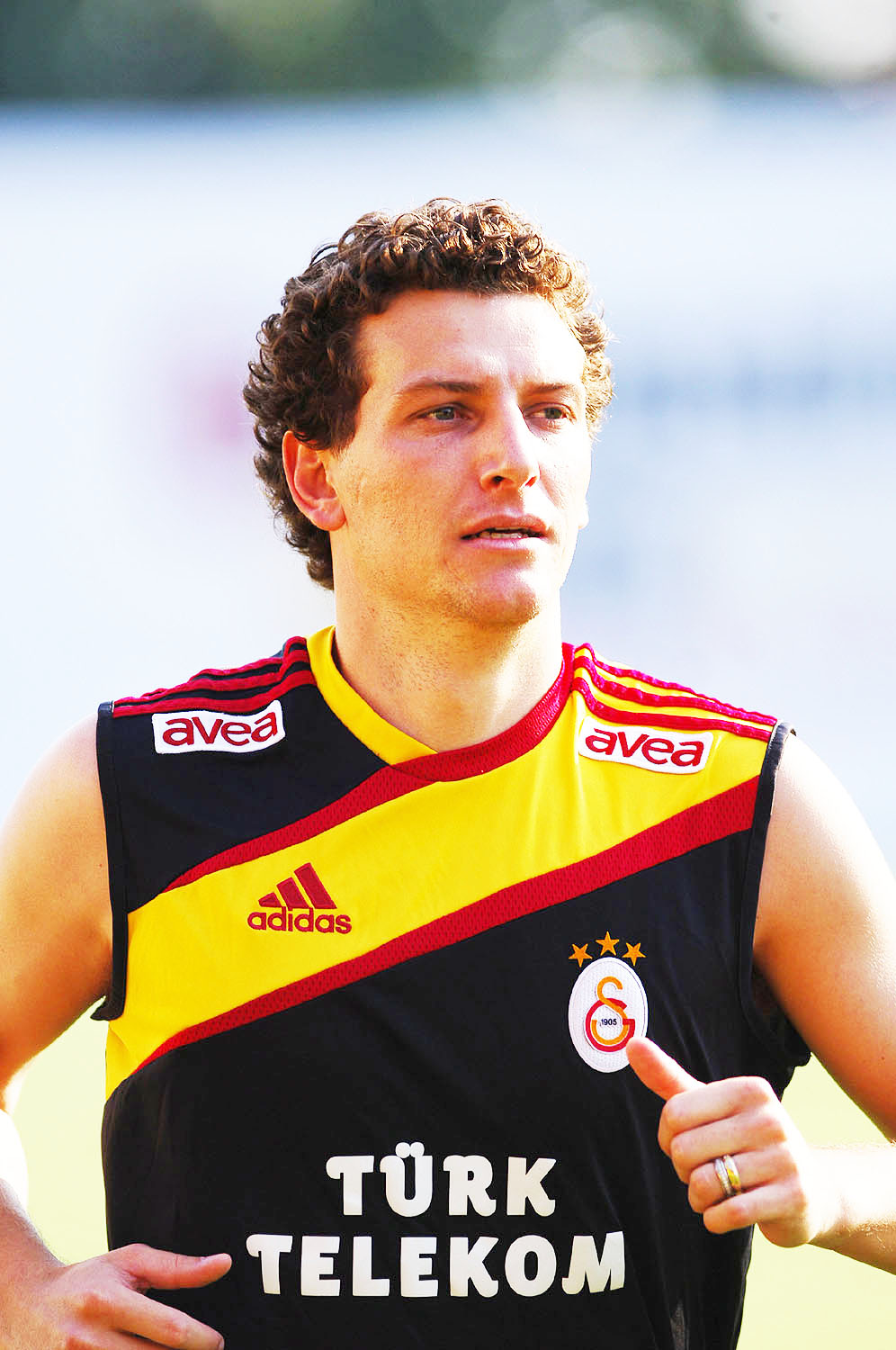
Elano

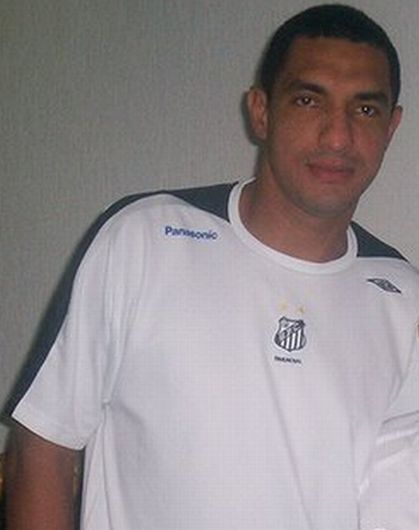
Fábio Costa

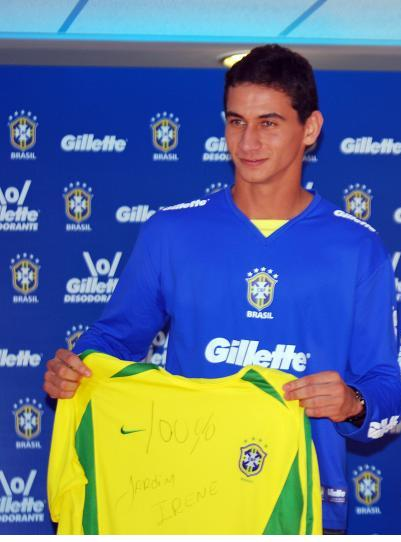
Paulo Henrique Ganso

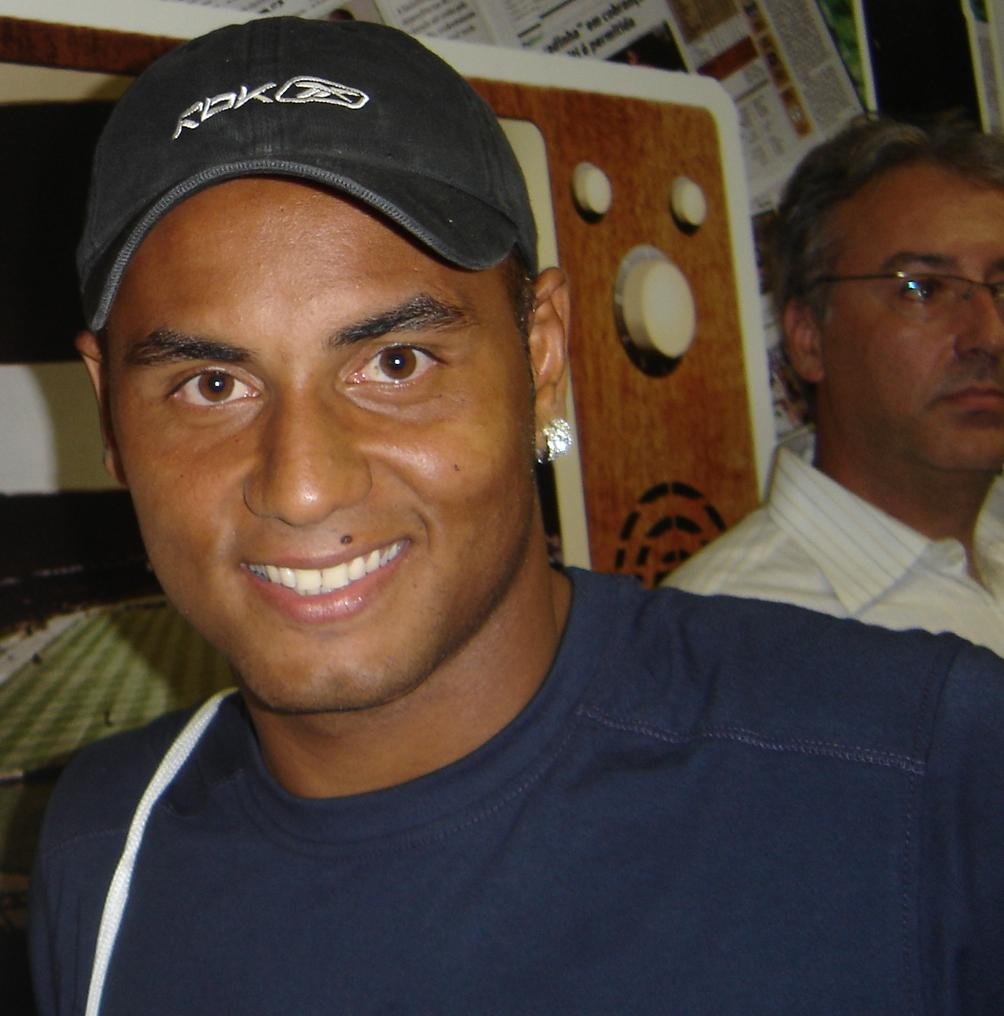
Jonathan

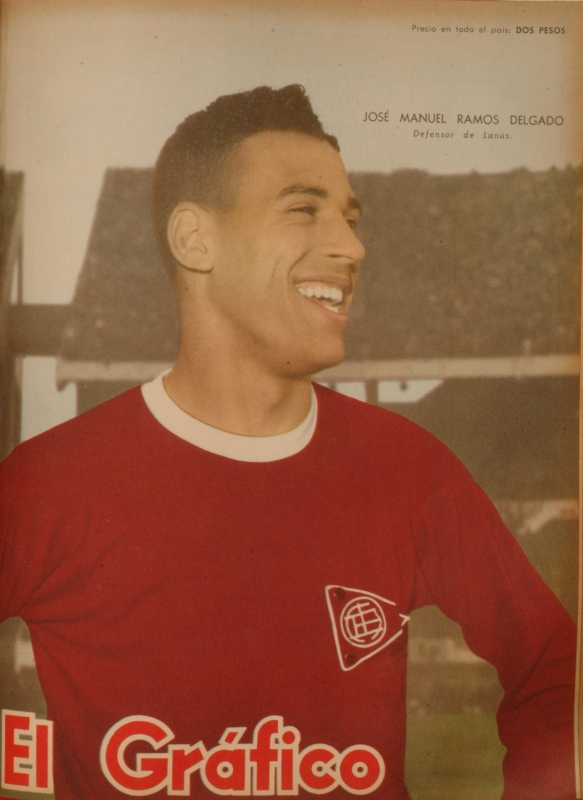
José Ramos Delgado

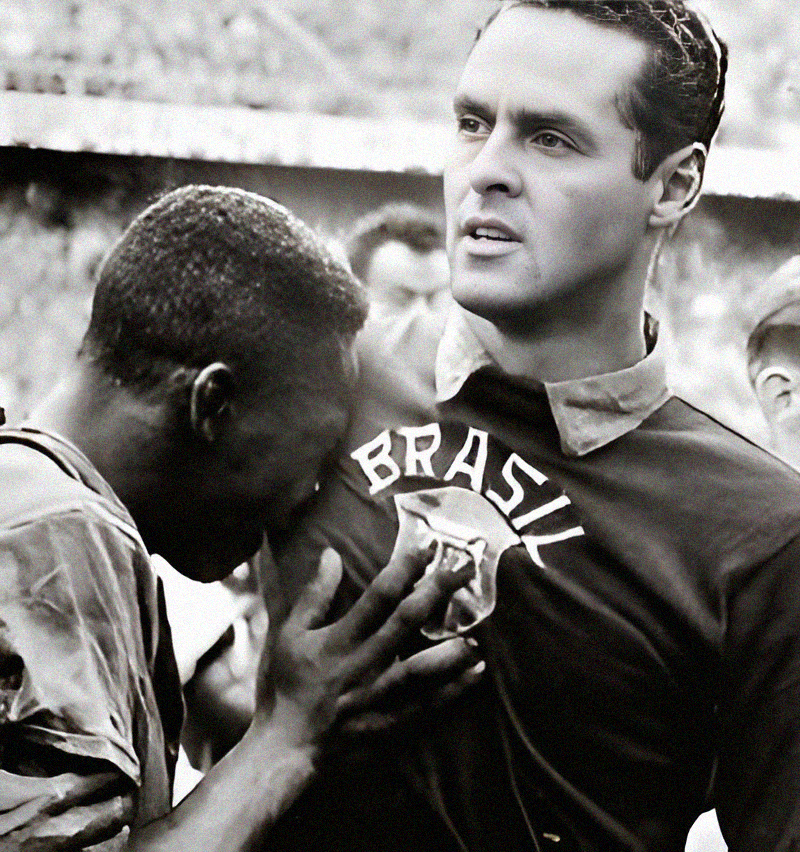
Gilmar

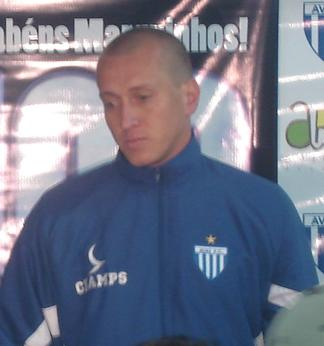
Marquinhos

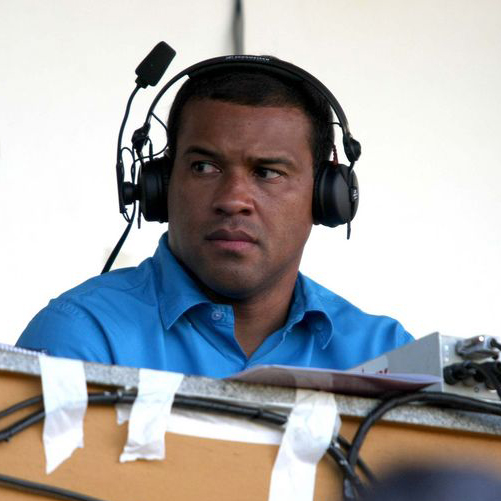
Müller

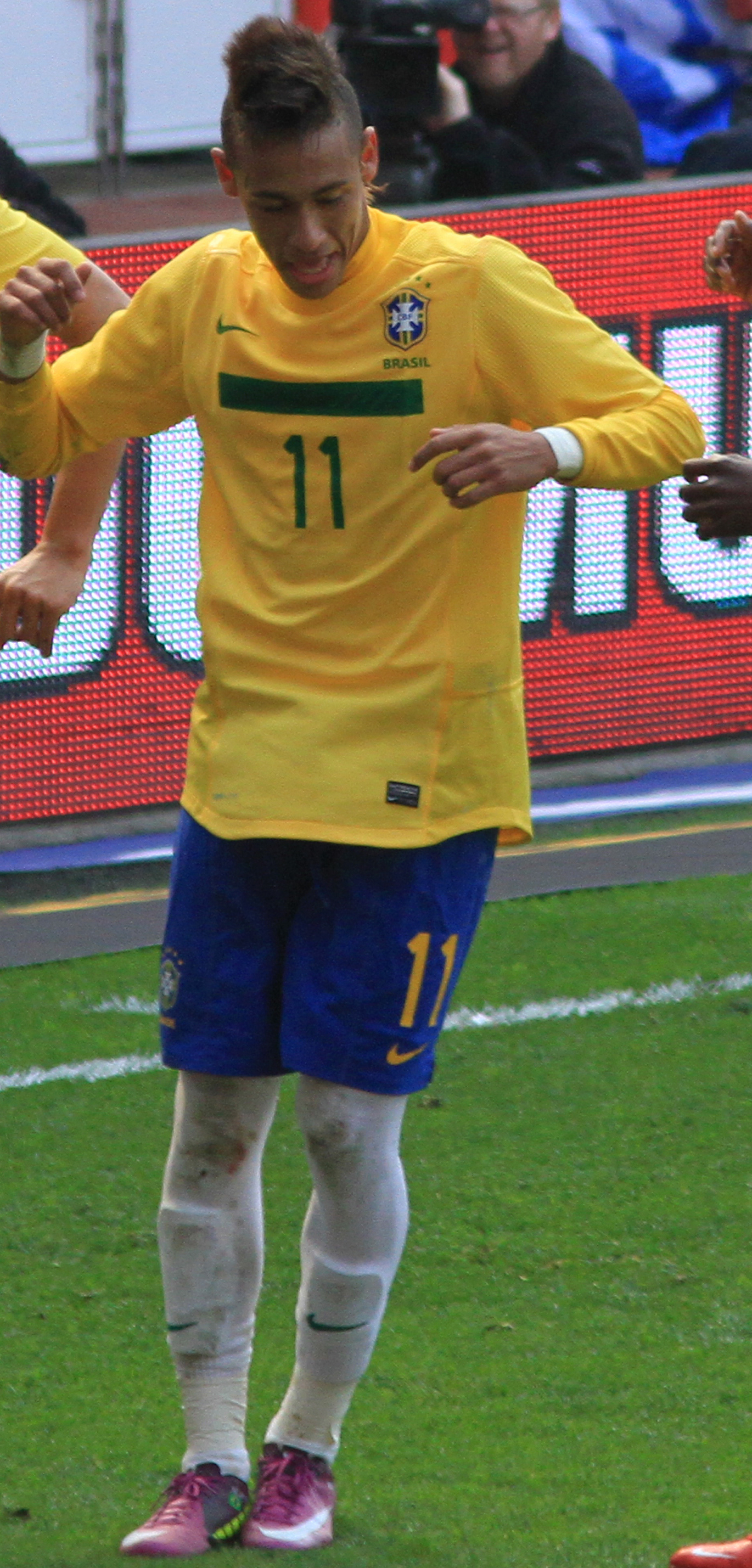
Neymar

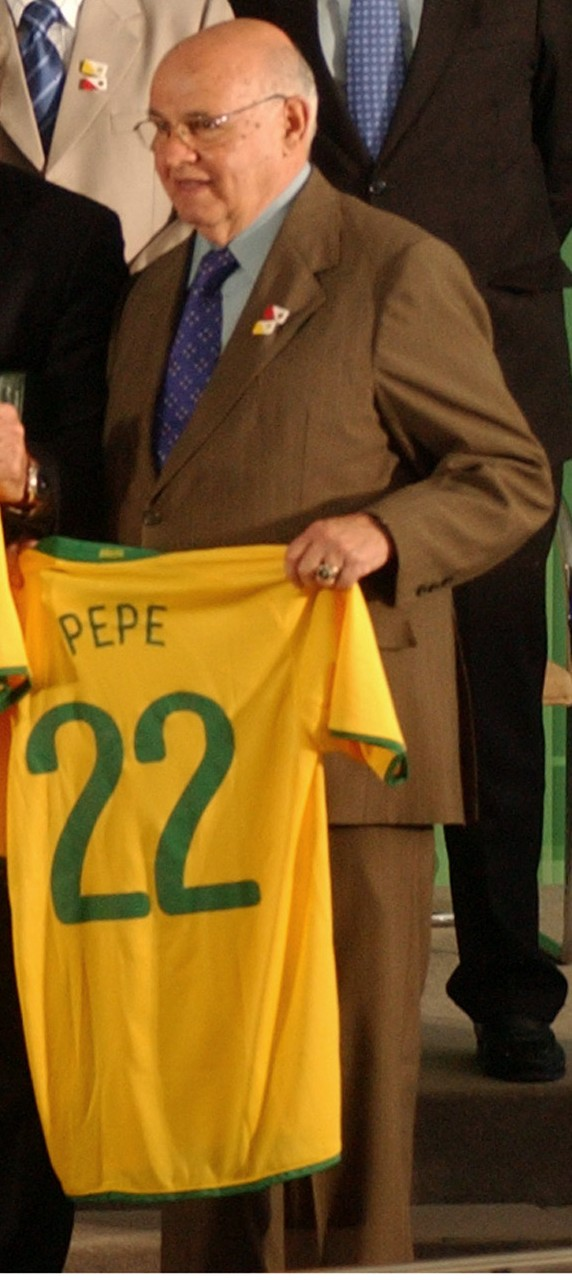
Pepe

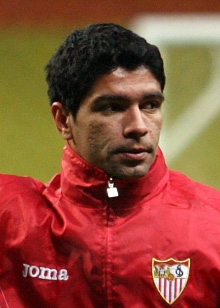
Renato

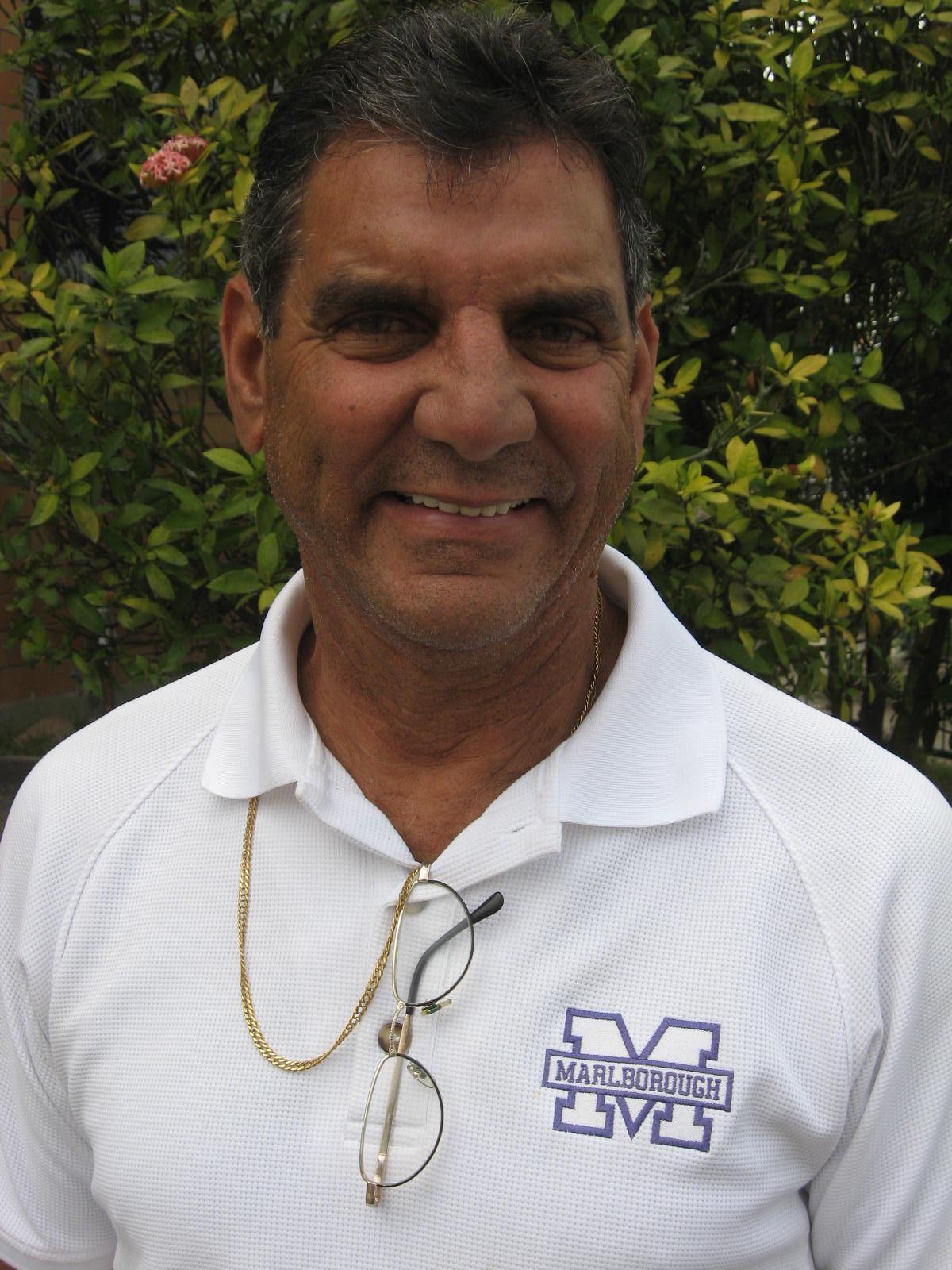
Rildo

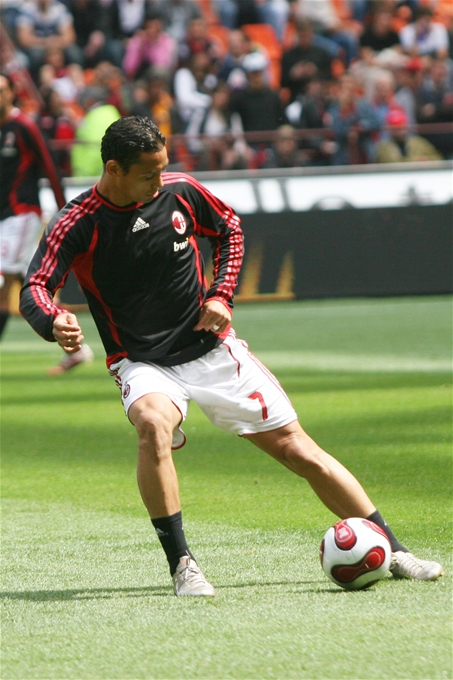
Ricardo Oliveira

Robinho

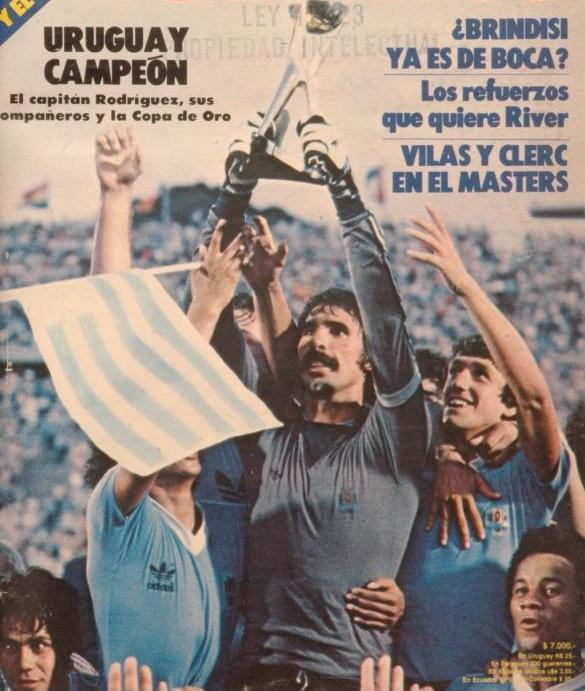
Rodolfo Rodríguez

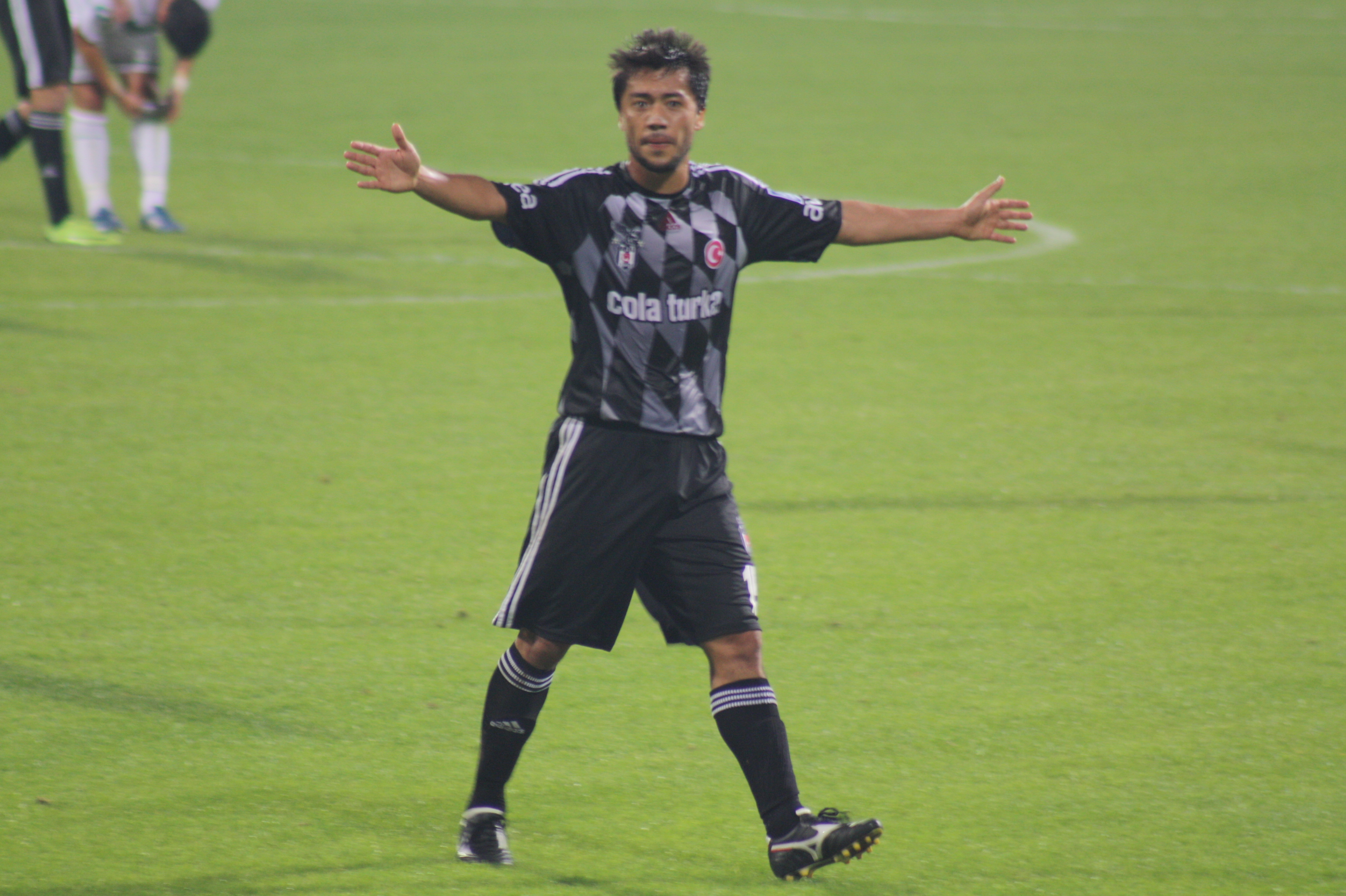
Rodrigo Tabata

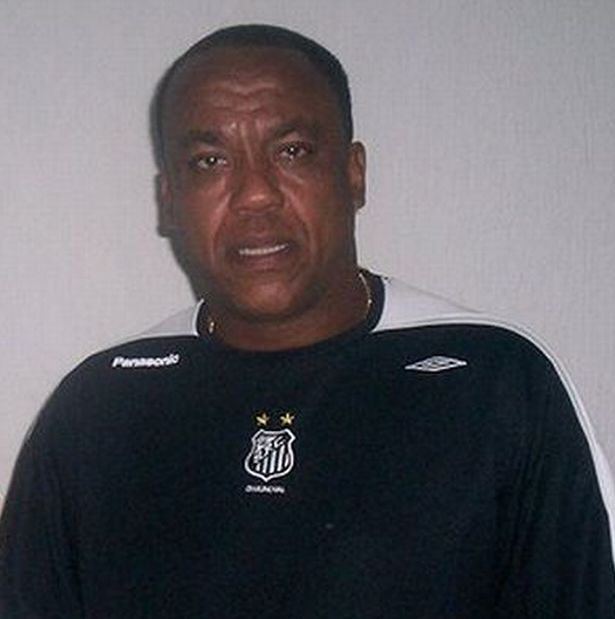
Serginho Chulapa

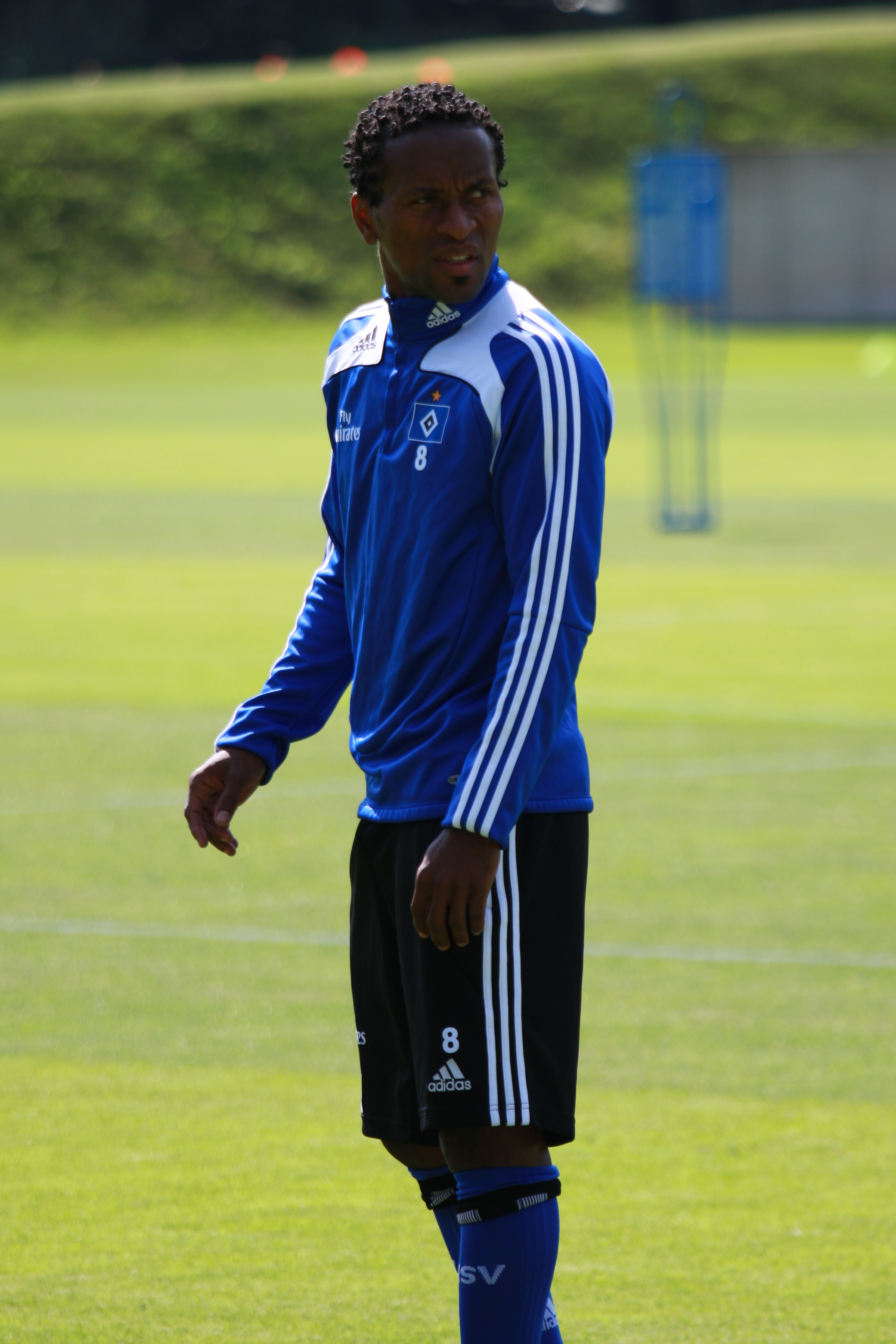
Zé Roberto

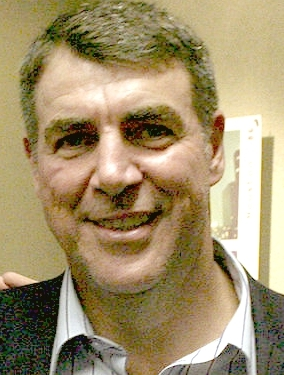
Zetti

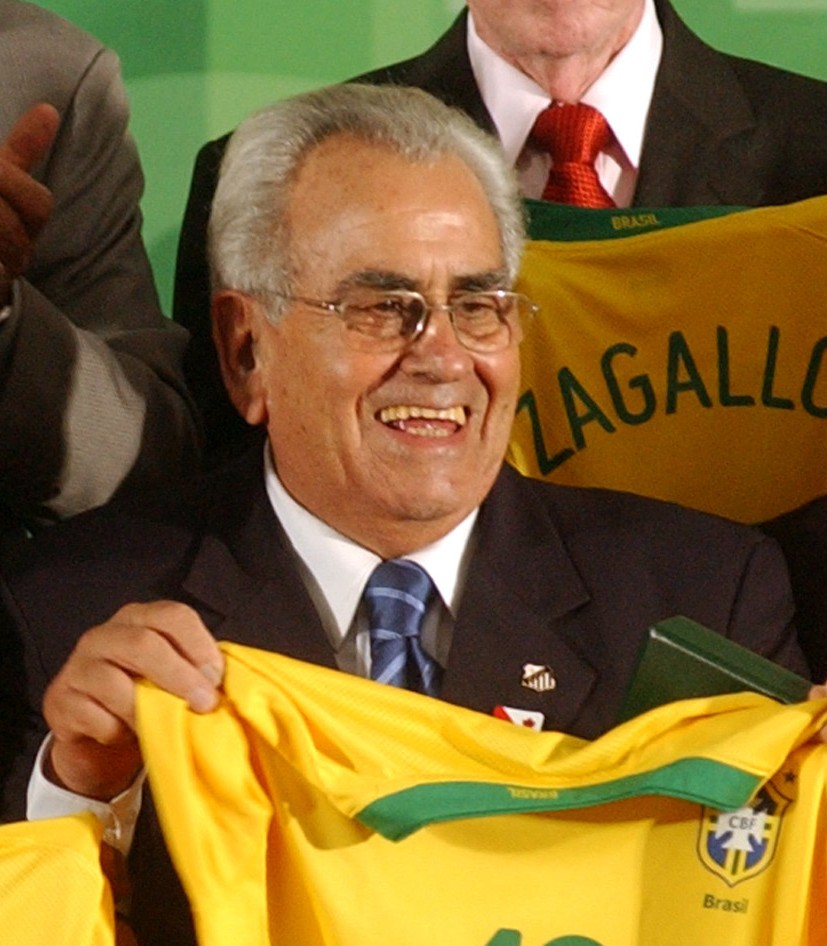
Zito

Name	Nationality	Position^{[NB]}	Santos career	Apps	Goals	Notes	Ref
Abel	Brazil	Forward	1965–1971	323	28		
Abel	Brazil	Midfielder	1924–1927	21	2		
Abelardo	Brazil	Midfielder	1950	5	2		
Abelha	Brazil	Midfielder	1920	1	0		
Abreu	Brazil	Defender	1931–1944	114	0		
Adaílton	Brazil	Defender	2007–2010	90	3		
Ademar	Brazil	Forward	1952	1	0		
Ademir	Brazil	Midfielder	1964–1965	2	0		
Ademir	Brazil	Defender	1987	1	0		
Ademir Maria	Brazil	Goalkeeper	1979–1983	37	0		
Aderlan	Brazil	Defender	2024–2025	19	0		
Adiel	Brazil	Midfielder	1998–2003	63	4		
Adílson	Brazil	Forward	1971–1976	108	17		
Admundo	Brazil	Midfielder	1976	26	3		
Adolfrises	Brazil	Midfielder	1945–1948	48	35		
Adolpho Millon	Brazil	Forward	1912–1922	119	41		
Adoniran	Brazil	Midfielder	2007–2008	22	2		
**Adonis Frías**	Argentina	Defender	2025–present	13	0		
Adriano	Brazil	Midfielder	2006–2009;2010–2013	186	0		
Afonsinho	Brazil	Midfielder	1957–1960	114	20		
Afonsinho	Brazil	Midfielder	1972	57	2		
Agnaldo	Brazil	Midfielder	1987	1	0		
Agne Boklund	Sweden	Goalkeeper	1923–1927	58	0		
Agostinho	Brazil	Forward	1923	1	1		
Agostinho dos Santos	Brazil	Defender	1935–1936	28	0		
Agostinho Serrão	Brazil	Midfielder	1932–1933	34	2		
Aguiar	Brazil	Midfielder	1926	1	0		
Aguinaldo	Brazil	Goalkeeper	1969–1970	22	0		
Aguinaldo Secco	Brazil	Midfielder	1959–1960	6	3		
Agustín Cejas	Argentina	Goalkeeper	1970–1974	254	0		
Aílton Lira	Brazil	Midfielder	1976–1979	182	37		
Aílton	Brazil	Forward	1999–2000;2002	32	4		
Aílton Luiz	Brazil	Defender	1979–1980	15	0		
Aílton Silva	Brazil	Defender	1976–1977	31	0		
Aires	Brazil	Forward	1952	9	3		
Aírton	Brazil	Midfielder	1960	9	5		
Airton Pavilhão	Brazil	Defender	1958	2	0		
Alan Kardec	Brazil	Forward	2012	64	14		
Alan Patrick	Brazil	Midfielder	2009–2011	39	7		
Alan Santos	Brazil	Midfielder	2012–2014	76	2		
Albertinho	Brazil	Defender	1944–1947	59	7		
Albeiro Usuriaga	Colombia	Forward	1996	2	2		
Alberto	Argentina	Goleiro	1950–1951	2	0		
Alberto	Brazil	Defender	1989	2	0		
Alberto	Brazil	Forward	2002	32	12		
Alberto Dell'Occhio	Argentina	Goalkeeper	1950	1	0		
Alceu	Brazil	Forward	1975–1976	18	2		
Alcides	Brazil	Defender	2004	6	0		
Alcides Pequeno	Brazil	Midfielder	1914;1916	6	0		
Alcindo	Brazil	Midfielder	1972–1973	96	48		
Aldo	Brazil	Goalkeeper	1949–1950	26	0		
Alejandro Villarreal	Colombia	Forward	2024	1	0		
Alemão	Brazil	Forward	1952–1953;1955	43	13		
Alemão	Brazil	Forward	2008–2009	4	1		
Alemãozinho	Brazil	Forward	1948–1952	99	22		
Alessandro	Brazil	Defender	2007	27	1		
Alessandro Cambalhota	Brazil	Forward	1996–1999	117	33		
Alex	Brazil	Defender	2002–2004	103	20		
Alex Nascimento	Brazil	Defender	2020–2021;2022–2024	34	1		
Alex Sandro	Brazil	Defender	2010–2011	57	3		
Alex Willian	Brazil	Midfielder	2008	3	0		
Alexandre	Brazil	Midfielder	1996–1997	65	10		
Alexandre	Brazil	Midfielder	2005	1	0		
Alexandre Alves	Brazil	Midfielder	2002–2003	44	0		
Alexandre Menudo	Brazil	Defender	1992	8	0		
**Alexis Duarte**	Paraguay	Defender	2025–present	5	0		
Alfredinho	Brazil	Forward	1938	1	0		
Alfredinho	Brazil	Forward	1955–1959	121	32		
Alfredo	Brazil	Midfielder	1923–1925;1927–1934	269	4		
Alfredo	Brazil	Forward	1937–1938	5	1		
Alfredo	Brazil	Defender	1942	1	0		
Alfredo Bernardino	Brazil	Midfielder	1944	1	2		
Alfredo Morelos	Colombia	Forward	2023–2024	20	4		
Alfredo Mostarda	Brazil	Defender	1977	45	1		
Alfredo Polvo	Brazil	Defender	1945–1949	107	0		
Allanzinho	Brazil	Forward	2021;2022	8	0		
Alison	Brazil	Midfielder	2011;2013–2016;2017–2021;2023–2024	272	4		
Almeida	Brazil	Defender	1976	19	0		
Almir	Brazil	Forward	1981	3	0		
Almir	Brazil	Forward	1990–1993	117	28		
Almir Pernambuquinho	Brazil	Forward	1963–1965	39	4		
Almiro	Brazil	Midfielder	1967–1968	11	1		
Alonso	Brazil	Forward	1920	1	0		
Alpheu	Brazil	Defender	1938	9	0		
Altair	Brazil	Defender	2005	7	0		
Altamiro	Brazil	Forward	1923	19	3		
Altivo	Brazil	Defender	1972–1973	21	0		
Aluísio Guerreiro	Brazil	Forward	1980–1982;1989	58	18		
Álvaro	Brazil	Forward	1953–1959;1961	290	111		
**Álvaro Barreal**	Argentina	Midfielder	2025–present	37	9		
Álvaro Lobo	Brazil	Forward	1950	1	0		
Alves	Brazil	Midfielder	1928	1	0		
Amaral	Brazil	Defender	1980	1	0		
Amaral	Brazil	Defender	1981	18	0		
Amaral	Brazil	Defender	1990	3	0		
Amaro	Brazil	Defender	1951	1	0		
Amauri	Brazil	Forward	1966–1969	69	7		
Amauri	Brazil	Defender	1985–1986	27	0		
Ambrósio	Brazil	Midfielder	1913–1914	17	1		
Amendoim	Lebanon	Midfielder	1930	1	0		
Américo	Brazil	Defender	1942–1943	29	0		
Américo	Brazil	Forward	1952	2	1		
Américo Pinto	Brazil	Defender	1913–1921	79	0		
Américo Ratto	Brazil	Defender	1925–1929	33	0		
Amorim	Brazil	Defender	1927–1929;1931–1932	27	0		
Anacleto Ferramenta	Brazil	Forward	1912–1916	22	8		
Anadyr	Brazil	Forward	1930	1	0		
Ananias	Brazil	Midfielder	1954	1	0		
Anderson Carvalho	Brazil	Midfielder	2011–2012	15	1		
Anderson Ceará	Brazil	Midfielder	2018–2021	4	0		
Ânderson Lima	Brazil	Defender	1996–1999	156	18		
Ânderson Luís	Brazil	Midfielder	2000	43	2		
Anderson Salles	Brazil	Defender	2008	9	0		
Andrade	Brazil	Midfielder	2000–2002	0	0		
Andradina	Brazil	Forward	1996	16	0		
André	Brazil	Forward	2009–2010;2012–2013	97	41		
André Belezinha	Brazil	Midfielder	2006	30	2		
André Dias	Brazil	Forward	2000–2001	5	0		
André Luís	Brazil	Defender	2000–2004	213	14		
André Luiz	Brazil	Midfielder	2006	15	0		
André Astorga	Brazil	Defender	2009	14	0		
Andrei	Brazil	Defender	1999	31	1		
Angelim	Brazil	Midfielder	1948–1949	2	0		
Ângelo Gabriel	Brazil	Forward	2020–2023	129	5		
Aníbal	Brazil	Midfielder	1957	2	0		
Anibal Bastos	Brazil	Goalkeeper	1913	2	0		
Aníbal Denis	Brazil	Defender	1942–1943	15	0		
Anito	Brazil	Forward	1944	2	0		
Antenor	Brazil	Forward	1934;1936	26	14		
Antenor	Brazil	Forward	1972	5	0		
Antero	Brazil	Midfielder	1943–1944	54	1		
Antônio Carlos	Brazil	Defender	1979	15	1		
Antônio Carlos Braga	Brazil	Midfielder	1987	16	0		
Antônio Carlos Develis	Brazil	Forward	1986–1987	21	2		
Antônio Carlos Zago	Brazil	Defender	2004–2005;2007	31	1		
Antonio Capuano	Argentina	Goalkeeper	1942	1	0		
Antonio de Nigris	Mexico	Forward	2006	5	1		
António Fierro Siccand	Uruguay	Midfielder	1944	8	1		
Antoninho	Brazil	Forward	1941–1954	402	143		
Apodi	Brazil	Defender	2008	12	1		
Apparício	Brazil	Forward	1921–1922	11	3		
Apparicio Vega	Uruguay	Forward	1942–1943	3	2		
Aracaju	Brazil	Midfielder	1955	1	0		
Aralhe	Brazil	Forward	1914	1	0		
Aralton	Brazil	Defender	1944	14	0		
Aranha	Brazil	Forward	1915	12	0		
Aranha	Brazil	Goalkeeper	2011–2014	125	0		
Arantes	Brazil	Defender	1912–1914;1916–1921	46	0		
Araken Patusca	Brazil	Forward	1923–1929;1935–1937	197	184		
Araújo	Brazil	Forward	1937	1	0		
Argel	Brazil	Defender	1998–1999	87	10		
Argemiro	Brazil	Midfielder	1933	1	0		
Ari	Brazil	Defender	1972	1	0		
Ari Silva	Brazil	Midfielder	1943–1944	53	1		
Ari Silva	Brazil	Defender	1956	1	0		
Arinélson	Brazil	Midfielder	1997	43	10		
Aristides	Brazil	Midfielder	1924–1925;1928–1931;1933	71	0		
Aristóbulo	Brazil	Midfielder	1953	1	0		
Arizinho	Brazil	Forward	1987	38	1		
Arlen	Brazil	Forward	1970–1971	16	1		
Arlindo	Brazil	Defender	1933–1935	58	0		
Arlindo	Brazil	Forward	1973	2	1		
Armandinho Cabral	Brazil	Forward	1931–1935;1941–1942	50	13		
Armandinho dos Santos	Brazil	Forward	1941	18	5		
Armandinho Vasconcelos	Brazil	Forward	1938–1939	2	0		
Arnaldo Silveira	Brazil	Forward	1912–1922	129	65		
Aoruca	Brazil	Midfielder	2010–2014	267	6		
Arthur	Brazil	Defender	1915–1919	40	0		
Arthur Gomes	Brazil	Forward	2016–2021	99	11		
Arthur Zwane	South Africa	Midfielder	1995–1996	7	1		
Arthurzinho	Brazil	Forward	1949	16	5		
Artigas	Brazil	Midfielder	1938–1939;1945–1950	165	1		
Arturo Saez	Uruguay	Forward	1988	7	1		
Ary	Brazil	Defender	1969	1	0		
Ary Patusca	Brazil	Forward	1915–1918;1920–1922	88	109		
Ary Fernandes	Brazil	Defender	1933–1934;1938;1941–1942	35	0		
Assunção	Brazil	Midfielder	1921	2	0		
Ataliba	Brazil	Forward	1984–1985	21	3		
Athiê	Brazil	Goalkeeper	1927–1934	172	0		
Athirson	Brazil	Midfielder	1998	39	1		
Atílio	Brazil	Defender	1950–1952	7	0		
Augustinho	Brazil	Forward	1931	1	0		
Augusto	Brazil	Forward	1979–1980	11	0		
Augusto	Brazil	Forward	1987	7	0		
Aurélio	Brazil	Midfielder	1937–1938	34	9		
Auro	Brazil	Defender	2022	15	0		
Ávalos	Brazil	Defender	2004–2007	113	4		
Avelino	Brazil	Midfielder	1937–1938	2	0		
Ávila	Brazil	Forward	1940	1	0		
Axel	Brazil	Midfielder	1989–1993	204	11		
Ayala	Brazil	Forward	1953	3	2		
Ayrton	Brazil	Forward	1938–1939	2	1		
Ayrton	Brazil	Midfielder	1959	1	0		
Babá	Brazil	Midfielder	1974–1977	52	3		
Badú	Brazil	Defender	1934–1935	47	0		
Bahia	Brazil	Forward	1950	3	0		
Baiano	Brazil	Forward	1957–1958	6	1		
Baiano	Brazil	Defender	1996–1998;2000;2007	172	6		
Baico	Brazil	Forward	1937	2	0		
Ballio	Brazil	Goalkeeper	1919;1922;1924–1927;1929	16	0		
Baptista	Brazil	Forward	1937	5	0		
Barbosinha	Brazil	Goalkeeper	1953–1957	73	0		
Barbuy	Brazil	Forward	1946–1950;1952	14	3		
Barrilote	Brazil	Forward	1935	1	0		
Barrocas	Brazil	Forward	1940	1	0		
Barros	Brazil	Forward	1929;1933	3	1		
Basílio	Brazil	Forward	2004–2005	116	41		
Batista	Brazil	Forward	1923;1925–1927	28	1		
Batista	Brazil	Forward	1963–1964	34	2		
Batista	Brazil	Goalkeeper	1976	1	0		
Batista	Brazil	Midfielder	1995–1996	22	0		
Bauer	Brazil	Defender	1974	3	0		
Bazzoni	Brazil	Forward	1938–1940	51	20		
Bé	Brazil	Forward	1961–1963	32	6		
Bechara	Brazil	Midfielder	1998–1999	9	1		
Belmarço	Brazil	Forward	1912;1914	2	0		
Ben Hur	Brazil	Forward	1987	1	1		
Benedito	Brazil	Goalkeeper	1916	7	0		
Benito	Brazil	Midfielder	1934	3	0		
Benito	Brazil	Goalkeeper	1980	1	0		
**Benjamín Rollheiser**	Argentina	Midfielder	2025–present	40	3		
Bernardi	Brazil	Defender	2002	4	0		
Bernardo	Brazil	Midfielder	1992	23	1		
Bernardo	Brazil	Midfielder	2012	14	1		
Bernardo Filho	Paraguay	Midfielder	1948–1950	28	1		
Betão	Brazil	Defender	1983–1984	53	1		
Betão	Brazil	Defender	2008	32	2		
Beto	Brazil	Midfielder	2005	5	0		
Bianque	Brazil	Defender	1973–1978	160	6		
Bibiano	Brazil	Forward	1940	10	4		
Bicalho	Brazil	Midfielder	1920	1	0		
Bida	Brazil	Midfielder	2008	16	2		
Bill	Brazil	Forward	2012–2013	17	2		
**Billal Brahimi**	Algeria	Forward	2025–present	1	0		
Billy Arce	Ecuador	Forward	2024	2	0		
Bilú	Brazil	Defender	1919–1928;1930	195	0		
Bino	Brazil	Forward	1953	2	0		
Bira	Brazil	Forward	1962	1	0		
Biro	Brazil	Defender	1986;1988	4	0		
Biruta	Brazil	Forward	1935–1936	2	0		
Bisoca	Brazil	Midfielder	1933–1934	26	2		
Boca	Brazil	Forward	1954	14	3		
Bodinho	Brazil	Forward	1957–1958	3	0		
Bolinha	Brazil	Midfielder	1944–1945	21	0		
Bomfim	Brazil	Forward	1922–1923	7	0		
Bompeixe	Brazil	Defender	1929–1932;1936–1939	25	2		
Bonje	Brazil	Forward	1941	1	1		
Borges	Brazil	Forward	2011–2012	58	31		
Botelho	Brazil	Defender	1941	23	1		
Bozó	Brazil	Forward	1977	39	3		
Brandão	Brazil	Defender	1961	10	1		
Brandãozinho	Brazil	Forward	1951	8	4		
Brasílio	Brazil	Midfielder	1921	7	0		
Brauner	Brazil	Defender	1957–1958	40	1		
Brecha	Brazil	Midfielder	1972–1975	176	33		
Brenno	Brazil	Forward	1917;1919	7	1		
Breno Mello	Brazil	Forward	1957	7	2		
Bruno	Brazil	Goalkeeper	1930–1931	14	0		
Bruno	Brazil	Forward	1938	1	0		
Bruno	Brazil	Midfielder	2005	1	0		
Bruno Aguiar	Brazil	Defender	2010–2011	52	2		
Bruno Henrique	Brazil	Forward	2017–2019	88	20		
Bruno Marques	Brazil	Forward	2020–2021	33	4		
Bruno Mezenga	Brazil	Forward	2023	11	1		
Bruno Moraes	Brazil	Forward	2002–2003	5	0		
Bruno Oliveira	Brazil	Midfielder	2022	22	0		
Bruno Peres	Brazil	Defender	2012–2014	69	4		
Bruno Rodrigo	Brazil	Defender	2010–2012	79	5		
Bruno Uvini	Brazil	Defender	2014	14	2		
Bryan Angulo	Ecuador	Forward	2022	24	5		
Bryan Ruiz	Costa Rica	Midfielder	2018–2020	14	0		
Buglê	Brazil	Midfielder	1967	43	4		
Cabralzinho	Brazil	Forward	1961–1963	9	4		
Cacalo	Brazil	Forward	1958–1959	4	0		
Cacau	Brazil	Midfielder	1981	9	0		
Cadete	Brazil	Forward	1922	2	0		
Cadu	Brazil	Midfielder	2005	3	0		
Cadu	Brazil	Defender	2023	2	0		
Caíco	Brazil	Midfielder	1997–2001	148	18		
Caio	Brazil	Midfielder	1914	2	1		
Caio	Brazil	Forward	1997–1998;2000–2001	107	26		
Camacho	Brazil	Midfielder	2021–2023	101	1		
Camarão	Brazil	Forward	1923–1934	269	148		
Caju	Brazil	Defender	2014–2018	48	0		
Cajuru	Brazil	Goalkeeper	1952	1	0		
Caldeira	Brazil	Midfielder	2002	1	0		
Calvet	Brazil	Defender	1960–1964	217	1		
Camanducaia	Brazil	Forward	1994–1996;1999	120	20		
Camargo	Brazil	Midfielder	1931	2	0		
Camargo	Brazil	Forward	1983–1984	39	5		
Camilo	Brazil	Defender	1989–1991;1993;1995	84	2		
Campos	Brazil	Forward	1915	3	0		
Campos	Brazil	Forward	1980	21	5		
Canhoto	Brazil	Midfielder	1944;1946–1947	35	2		
Canhoto	Brazil	Forward	1952	3	0		
Canhoto	Brazil	Forward	1962	1	0		
Canindé	Brazil	Midfielder	2000–2003	24	1		
Capitão	Brazil	Forward	1976	12	1		
Carabina	Brazil	Forward	1941–1942	26	35		
Cardim	Brazil	Midfielder	1979–1980;1982	74	8		
Cardoso	Brazil	Midfielder	1923	3	0		
Careca	Brazil	Forward	1983	18	2		
Careca	Brazil	Defender	1988–1989	7	0		
Careca	Brazil	Forward	1997	9	2		
Carlindo	Brazil	Goalkeeper	1961–1962	4	0		
Carlinhos	Brazil	Forward	1954–1957	47	2		
Carlinhos	Brazil	Forward	1989	14	1		
Carlinhos	Brazil	Midfielder	1991–1992;1994–1997	152	10		
Carlinhos	Brazil	Defender	2005–2008	63	5		
Carlos	Brazil	Defender	1981	1	0		
Carlos Alberto Borges	Brazil	Midfielder	1986–1987	50	2		
Carlos Alberto Costa	Brazil	Midfielder	1986–1987	8	0		
Carlos Alberto Silva	Brazil	Forward	1987	21	0		
Carlos Alberto Torres	Brazil	Defender	1966–1975	443	39		
Carlos Frontini	Argentina	Forward	2005	8	1		
Carlos Galván	Argentina	Defender	2000–2001	76	4		
Carlos Germano	Brazil	Goalkeeper	2000	37	0		
Carlos Miraglia	Uruguay	Forward	1989	9	0		
Carlos Roberto	Brazil	Midfielder	1976–1978	99	0		
Carlos Sánchez	Uruguay	Midfielder	2018–2022	160	32		
Carlos Silva	Brazil	Midfielder	1979–1982	93	8		
Carlyle	Brazil	Forward	1952–1953	25	15		
Carvalho	Brazil	Forward	1921;1923	2	0		
Cassiá	Brazil	Defender	1979	23	2		
Cassiano	Brazil	Defender	1943	1	0		
Cassinho	Brazil	Midfielder	1991	8	0		
Cássio	Brazil	Defender	1952–1957	120	2		
Cássio	Brazil	Defender	1988–1989	44	1		
Cássio	Brazil	Defender	1997	37	1		
Castanheira	Brazil	Midfielder	1946–1948	37	0		
Castelhano	Brazil	Forward	1920	16	14		
Castro	Brazil	Defender	1992	11	0		
Catitu	Brazil	Forward	1931–1933	20	9		
Cavaco	Brazil	Forward	1939–1940	19	6		
Caxambu	Brazil	Forward	1946–1947	48	39		
Caxangá	Brazil	Goalkeeper	1931	1	0		
Ceará	Brazil	Defender	1999	7	0		
Célio	Brazil	Forward	1977–1979	51	8		
Celso	Brazil	Defender	1943	4	1		
Celso	Brazil	Midfielder	1982;1986–1988	147	4		
Celso Diniz	Brazil	Defender	1975	1	0		
Cento e Nove	Brazil	Forward	1950–1952	76	20		
Cepo	Brazil	Forward	1929–1930;1932	8	4		
Cerezo	Brazil	Midfielder	1994–1996	86	4		
César	Brazil	Midfielder	1932	1	0		
César Carioca	Brazil	Forward	1985	6	3		
César Ferreira	Brazil	Midfielder	1987–1990	160	8		
César Luis Menotti	Argentina	Forward	1968	1	0		
César Maluco	Brazil	Forward	1976	9	5		
César Pereyra	Uruguay	Defender	1988–1989	13	0		
César Sampaio	Brazil	Midfielder	1986–1991	290	9		
Charles	Brazil	Midfielder	2011	5	0		
Charré	Brazil	Midfielder	1949–1953	33	0		
Chibio	Brazil	Forward	1952	1	1		
Chicão	Brazil	Forward	1964	3	0		
Chicão	Brazil	Midfielder	1981–1983	33	2		
Chicão	Brazil	Forward	1987–1988	31	5		
Chico Formiga	Brazil	Defender	1950–1957;1959–1962	410	2		
Chico Massulo	Brazil	Forward	1920–1923	30	11		
Chiquinho	Brazil		1943	1	0		
Chiquinho	Brazil	Goalkeeper	1947–1949	42	0		
Chiquinho	Brazil	Forward	1952	3	0		
Chiquinho	Brazil	Defender	1984–1985	51	2		
Chiquinho	Brazil	Defender	2015	24	1		
Christian Cueva	Peru	Midfielder	2019	16	0		
Cícero	Brazil	Midfielder	2013–2014	90	35		
Cícero Ratto	Brazil	Defender	1916–1921	67	1		
Cicinho	Brazil	Defender	2013–2015	101	4		
Cido Jacaré	Brazil	Defender	1963–1965	12	0		
Cilas	Brazil	Forward	1951	16	7		
Cilinho	Brazil	Forward	1992–1993	77	11		
Ciro	Brazil	Forward	1957–1958	11	1		
Ciro Werneck	Brazil	Goalkeeper	1914–1915	20	0		
Claiton	Brazil	Midfielder	2004	30	1		
Claudemir	Brazil	Defender	1996	2	0		
Claudinho	Brazil	Forward	1976–1984	192	19		
Claudinho	Brazil	Defender	1987	46	2		
Claudino	Brazil	Defender	1921;1923–1924	14	7		
Cláudio	Brazil	Forward	1940–1941;1943–1944	116	33		
Cláudio	Brazil	Midfielder	1959	1	0		
Cláudio	Brazil	Goalkeeper	1965–1969;1972–1973	230	0		
Cláudio	Brazil	Defender	1996	29	1		
Cláudio	Brazil	Defender	1999	11	1		
Cláudio Adão	Brazil	Forward	1973–1976	133	51		
Cláudio Gaúcho	Brazil	Midfielder	1979–1980	13	1		
Cláudio José	Brazil	Forward	1988	5	2		
Claudio Maldonado	Chile	Midfielder	2006–2007	85	1		
Cláudio Pitbull	Brazil	Forward	2005–2006	12	2		
Claudiomiro	Brazil	Defender	1998–2001	158	13		
Claudionor	Brazil	Midfielder	1959	1	1		
Clayton	Brazil	Forward	1974–1978	50	6		
Cleber	Brazil	Forward	1991	5	0		
Cléber	Brazil	Defender	2001–2002	6	2		
Cléber Reis	Brazil	Defender	2017	10	0		
Cleber Santana	Brazil	Midfielder	2006–2007	97	23		
Clodoaldo	Brazil	Midfielder	1966–1980	508	14		
Clóvis	Brazil	Forward	1996	11	4		
Constantino Mollitsas	Brazil	Forward	1920–1924;1930	84	50		
Constantino Pereira	Brazil		1938	1	1		
Copeu	Brazil	Forward	1967	8	2		
Cortez	Brazil	Midfielder	1958–1959	5	0		
Costa e Silva	Brazil	Goalkeeper	1917–1918	25	0		
Couto	Brazil	Defender	1928	2	0		
Cristian Ledesma	Argentina	Midfielder	2015	4	0		
Cristiano	Brazil	Defender	1992	1	0		
Cruz	Brazil		1923	1	0		
Crystian	Brazil	Defender	2010–2012	16	0		
Coutinho	Brazil	Forward	1958–1967;1969–1970	450	368		
Cuca	Brazil	Forward	1993	46	15		
Cuca	Brazil	Midfielder	1996	10	0		
Cyro	Brazil	Goalkeeper	1934–1940;1943	183	0		
Da Silva	Brazil	Forward	1974–1976	22	0		
Dalmo	Brazil	Defender	1957–1964	365	4		
Damaso	Brazil	Midfielder	1912	1	0		
Daniel	Brazil	Forward	1934	5	1		
Daniel da Silva	Brazil	Defender	1996–1997	10	0		
Daniel Guedes	Brazil	Defender	2014–2019	26	1		
Daniel Paulista	Brazil	Midfielder	2003–2004	38	1		
Daniel Ruiz	Colombia	Midfielder	2023	19	0		
Danilinho	Brazil	Midfielder	2005	10	0		
Danilo	Brazil	Forward	1946	1	1		
Danilo	Brazil	Midfielder	2010–2011	79	10		
Danilo Boza	Brazil	Defender	2021	22	0		
Dantas	Brazil	Midfielder	1916–1918	6	1		
Darci	Brazil	Midfielder	1957;1959	3	0		
Darci	Brazil	Midfielder	1993	64	8		
Davi	Brazil	Defender	1982–1989	199	9		
David	Brazil	Forward	1933	1	0		
David	Brazil	Forward	1970–1971	64	7		
David Braz	Brazil	Defender	2012–2014;2018	216	17		
David Pimenta	Brazil	Defender	1923–1929	99	6		
Dé	Brazil	Defender	1965	7	0		
Dé	Brazil	Defender	1978–1979	3	2		
De Rosis	Brazil	Midfielder	1977–1978	12	1		
De Souza	Brazil	Midfielder	1951	1	0		
Décio Brito	Brazil	Defender	1961–1962	37	1		
Dedé	Brazil		1952	1	0		
Dedeco	Brazil	Forward	1952	5	1		
Deivid	Brazil	Forward	1999–2001;2004–2005	141	61		
Deivid Washington	Brazil	Forward	2023;2025	36	3		
Dejan Petković	Serbia	Midfielder	2007	21	1		
Del Vecchio	Brazil	Forward	1953–1957;1965–1966	175	105		
Delso	Brazil	Forward	1935–1936	16	11		
Dema	Brazil	Midfielder	1983–1987	150	1		
Demétrios	Brazil	Forward	1994–1995	46	14		
Denílton	Brazil	Goalkeeper	1992	1	0		
Dênis	Brazil	Defender	2006–2008	51	2		
Deoclydes	Brazil	Forward	1940	3	0		
Derick	Brazil	Defender	2020	1	0		
Derlis González	Paraguay	Forward	2018–2020	56	9		
Derval	Brazil	Midfielder	1990	44	0		
Desmond Armstrong	United States	Defender	1991	3	0		
Dicá	Brazil	Midfielder	1971	29	4		
Didi	Brazil	Forward	1962	7	0		
Didi	Brazil	Midfielder	1975–1976	42	3		
Dido	Brazil	Midfielder	1983–1984	7	0		
Diego	Brazil	Midfielder	2002–2004	133	38		
Diego Ayala	Paraguay	Midfielder	1941–1947	111	0		
Diego Cardoso	Brazil	Forward	2014–2015	17	4		
Diego Lima	Brazil	Forward	2005	12	1		
Diego Monar	Brazil		2010	1	0		
Diego Pituca	Brazil	Midfielder	2017–2021;2024–2025	243	17		
Diego Tardelli	Brazil	Forward	2021	13	1		
Diegues	Brazil	Forward	1926	3	1		
Dilmar	Brazil	Goalkeeper	1959	1	0		
Dimas	Brazil	Defender	1953	2	0		
Dimas	Brazil	Midfielder	1982	15	0		
Dimba	Brazil	Forward	2010–2012	17	3		
Dinho	Brazil	Defender	1943;1945–1950	86	0		
Dinho	Brazil	Defender	1992–1994	62	2		
Dinho	Brazil	Midfielder	1994	52	3		
Dino I	Brazil	Midfielder	1933–1936	65	1		
Dino	Brazil	Forward	1950	1	0		
Dino Furacão	Brazil	Forward	1986	25	11		
**Diógenes**	Brazil	Goalkeeper	2024–present	2	0		
Diogo	Brazil	Midfielder	1951–1952	6	0		
Diogo	Brazil	Forward	2011	20	1		
Diogo Vitor	Brazil	Forward	2016–2018	10	1		
Díonísio	Brazil	Midfielder	2007–2008	32	0		
Dirceu	Brazil	Goalkeeper	1953	1	0		
Ditinho	Brazil	Defender	1989	29	3		
Djalma	Brazil	Midfielder	1925–1926	8	0		
Djalma	Brazil	Midfielder	1949	1	0		
Djalma Dias	Brazil	Defender	1969–1970	109	3		
Djalma Duarte	Brazil	Midfielder	1969–1970	18	6		
Dodi	Brazil	Midfielder	2023	49	0		
Dodô	Brazil	Midfielder	1944	3	0		
Dodô	Brazil	Forward	1999–2001	108	59		
Dodô	Brazil	Defender	2018;2023	71	1		
Dom Pedro	Brazil	Midfielder	1958	2	0		
Domingos	Brazil	Defender	2004–2005;2006–2009	180	7		
Doni	Brazil	Goalkeeper	2004	13	0		
Doquinha	Brazil	Forward	1942	1	0		
Douglas	Brazil	Midfielder	1967–1972	223	77		
Douglas	Brazil	Forward	2002–2005	63	9		
Douglas	Brazil	Goalkeeper	2008–2009	28	0		
Dorval	Brazil	Forward	1956–1967	610	193		
Dufles	Brazil	Midfielder	1958	3	0		
Dunga	Brazil	Midfielder	1986	52	7		
Durval	Brazil	Defender	2010–2013	249	7		
Durval Damasceno	Brazil	Goalkeeper	1913–1914	11	0		
Dutra	Brazil	Defender	1997;2001	75	2		
Ed Carlos	Brazil	Midfielder	2022–2023	13	0		
Edelvan	Brazil	Midfielder	1987–1988	25	2		
Éder	Brazil	Midfielder	1987	17	7		
Éder Lima	Brazil	Defender	2011	6	0		
Éder Sanches	Brazil	Defender	1989	10	0		
Edevar	Brazil	Goalkeeper	1970–1972	35	0		
Edinho	Brazil	Goalkeeper	1991;1994–1998	195	0		
Edilson	Brazil	Forward	1989	10	0		
Edgar Báez	Paraguay	Forward	1996–1997	33	6		
Edgard	Brazil	Forward	1921–1923;1931	24	2		
Edmar	Brazil	Forward	1992	19	0		
Edmilson	Brazil		1991	3	0		
Edmílson	Brazil	Midfielder	2005–2007	8	2		
Edmundo	Brazil	Forward	2000	21	8		
Ednaldo	Brazil	Forward	1987–1988	3	0		
Edson	Brazil	Defender	1976;1978	5	0		
Edson	Brazil	Midfielder	1983;1986	13	0		
Edson	Brazil	Forward	1988	22	2		
Edson Ampola	Brazil	Forward	1990	20	1		
Edson Borracha	Brazil	Goalkeeper	1976	2	0		
Edu	Brazil		1988	1	0		
Edu	Brazil	Forward	1966–1976	584	184		
Edu Dracena	Brazil	Defender	2009–2014	230	17		
Edu Marangon	Brazil	Midfielder	1990–1992	55	6		
Eduardinho	Brazil	Forward	1944	1	0		
Eduardo	Brazil	Forward	1926	1	0		
Eduardo	Brazil	Defender	1993	11	0		
Eduardo Bauermann	Brazil	Defender	2022–2023	78	5		
Eduardo Marques	Brazil	Forward	1997–2001	111	11		
Eduardo Sasha	Brazil	Forward	2018–2020	108	23		
Edwin Valencia	Colombia	Midfielder	2015–2016	18	0		
Elano	Brazil	Midfielder	2001–2004;2011–2012;2015–2016	332	68		
Élcio	Brazil	Goalkeeper	1967	1	0		
Élder	Brazil	Midfielder	1996–2000	86	3		
Elesbão	Brazil	Midfielder	1939–1943	82	1		
Eli Sabiá	Brazil	Defender	2009	23	1		
Eliseu	Brazil	Midfielder	1964–1965;1968	21	3		
Elivelton	Brazil	Midfielder	2010	1	0		
Eloi	Brazil	Defender	1952	1	0		
Eloi	Brazil	Midfielder	1981	56	15		
Elmo Bovio	Argentina	Midfielder	1950	1	1		
Elson	Brazil	Forward	1954	1	0		
Élson	Brazil	Midfielder	1999	25	1		
Élton	Brazil	Midfielder	2005	19	3		
Elzo	Brazil	Forward	1955	8	0		
Emerson	Brazil	Midfielder	2009	6	0		
Emerson Barbosa	Brazil	Defender	2017	1	0		
Emerson Palmieri	Brazil	Defender	2011–2014	34	3		
Emiliano Vecchio	Argentina	Midfielder	2016–2019	42	1		
Emiliano Velázquez	Uruguay	Defender	2021–2022	27	0		
Enéas	Brazil	Midfielder	1984–1986	11	0		
Enrique Vernieres	Argentina	Midfielder	1938	1	0		
Enzo Monteiro	Bolivia	Forward	2024	1	0		
Ernani	Brazil	Midfielder	1912–1914	10	0		
Ernani	Brazil	Goalkeeper	1977	33	0		
Ernani	Brazil	Midfielder	1989	17	3		
Ernesto Picot	Argentina	Midfielder	1954	2	0		
Esmeraldo	Brazil	Midfielder	1913	1	0		
Esquerdinha	Brazil	Midfielder	2002	15	0		
Essinho	Brazil	Forward	1988–1989;1991;1993	13	0		
Eugenio	Brazil	Forward	1921	2	0		
Eugenio Mena	Chile	Defender	2013–2014	62	1		
Eunápio	Brazil	Forward	1944–1945	51	19		
Eurico Vergueiro	Brazil	Defender	1919	3	0		
Euzébio	Brazil	Forward	1973–1974	75	26		
Evaldo	Brazil	Defender	2008	9	1		
Evando	Brazil	Forward	2005	9	1		
Evandro	Brazil	Goalkeeper	1981–1982;1986	23	0		
Evandro	Brazil	Midfielder	2019–2020	23	1		
Evangelista	Brazil	Forward	1925–1931	124	56		
Everson	Brazil	Goalkeeper	2019–2020	52	0		
Evilásio	Brazil	Midfielder	1977–1978	5	0		
Ewerton Páscoa	Brazil	Defender	2012	12	0		
Expedito	Brazil	Defender	1946–1953	162	0		
Ezequiel	Brazil	Defender	1962	1	0		
Ezequiel Miralles	Argentina	Forward	2012–2013	34	12		
Fabão	Brazil	Defender	2005	1	0		
Fabão	Brazil	Defender	2008–2009	68	3		
Fabián Noguera	Argentina	Defender	2016–2018	8	2		
Fabiano	Brazil	Forward	2003	54	12		
Fabiano	Brazil	Forward	2005–2009	24	7		
Fabiano Eller	Brazil	Defender	2008–2009	44	1		
Fabiano Santos	Brazil	Defender	2008	4	0		
Fabiano Souza	Brazil	Forward	2002	4	0		
Fabinho	Brazil	Midfielder	2004–2006	74	1		
Fabinho	Brazil	Midfielder	2006	29	2		
Fabinho	Brazil	Midfielder	2006–2007	8	0		
Fábio	Brazil	Goalkeeper	1933	6	0		
Fábio Baiano	Brazil	Midfielder	2005	15	1		
Fábio Costa	Brazil	Goalkeeper	2000–2003;2006–2010	345	0		
Fábio Santos	Brazil	Defender	2008	5	0		
Fausto	Brazil	Defender	1976–1979	76	1		
Feijó	Brazil	Defender	1953–1961	244	21		
Feitiço	Brazil	Forward	1927–1932;1936	151	215		
Felipe	Brazil	Goalkeeper	2006–2012	85	0		
Felipe Aguilar	Colombia	Defender	2019–2020	39	1		
Felipe Anderson	Brazil	Midfielder	2010–2013	110	9		
Felipe Azevedo	Brazil	Forward	2009	17	1		
Felipe Jonatan	Brazil	Defender	2019–2024	211	6		
Felippe Cardoso	Brazil	Forward	2018–2019	12	1		
Fernandes	Brazil	Forward	1998	17	2		
Fernandinho	Brazil	Midfielder	1974	25	3		
Fernandinho	Brazil	Forward	1981	1	0		
Fernandinho	Brazil	Forward	2021	1	0		
Fernando	Brazil	Forward	1953–1955	10	1		
Fernando	Brazil	Defender	1975–1979	256	2		
Fernando Diniz	Brazil	Midfielder	2005	5	0		
Fernando Fumagalli	Brazil	Midfielder	1997	19	4		
Fernando Leão	Brazil	Goalkeeper	1998–1999	2	0		
Fernando Matos	Brazil	Defender	1983–1985	63	2		
Fernando Medeiros	Brazil	Midfielder	2015–2016	6	1		
Fernando Pileggi	Brazil	Defender	2020–2021	2	0		
Fernando Uribe	Colombia	Forward	2019–2020	16	0		
Ferreira	Brazil	Midfielder	1934–1937;1940	51	0		
Ferreira	Brazil	Forward	1971–1974	95	5		
Ferreira	Brazil	Forward	1982	8	0		
Ferreira	Brazil	Goalkeeper	1988–1989	15	0		
Ferretti	Brazil	Forward	1971	24	7		
Figueira	Brazil	Midfielder	1935–1943	164	12		
Figueiró	Brazil	Defender	1961–1962	9	0		
Filhinho	Brazil	Midfielder	1925–1926	4	0		
Filipi Sousa	Brazil	Defender	2008	7	0		
Fillardi	Brazil	Forward	1938	3	1		
Fioti	Brazil	Defender	1956–1962	222	4		
Fito	Brazil	Midfielder	1969;1971–1972	11	0		
Flavinho	Brazil	Defender	1989–1993	123	1		
Flávio	Brazil	Forward	1921;1923	3	0		
Flávio	Brazil	Goalkeeper	1978–1979	27	0		
Flávio	Brazil	Defender	2004–2005	55	1		
Flávio Minuano	Brazil	Forward	1977	12	3		
Flávio Pacheco	Brazil	Defender	1985–1988	15	0		
Floriano	Brazil	Forward	1949	3	0		
Floriano Peixoto	Brazil	Midfielder	1930–1933	54	0		
Floriano Ratto	Brazil	Forward	1920;1922–1923	7	1		
Florido	Brazil	Goalkeeper	1946	1	0		
Fomm	Brazil	Midfielder	1919;1921	9	0		
Fontes	Brazil	Forward	1912;1917–1918	3	4		
Formiga	Brazil	Forward	1985	38	7		
França	Brazil	Defender	1990	12	0		
Francisco Martiarena	Argentina	Midfielder	1952	2	0		
Franco I	Brazil		1933–1934;1937–1938	7	1		
Franco II	Brazil	Forward	1930–1931;1933–1934;1936–1937	32	20		
Freddy Rincón	Colombia	Midfielder	2000–2001	54	6		
Freitas	Brazil	Forward	1976	7	1		
Fricson George	Ecuador	Defender	1999	2	0		
Friedenreich	Brazil	Forward	1930;1935	5	1		
Gabardinho	Brazil	Forward	1943	3	1		
Gabardo	Brazil	Forward	1943	12	3		
Gabriel	Brazil	Defender	1952–1953	5	0		
Gabriel Barbosa	Brazil	Forward	2013–2016;2018	210	84		
**Gabriel Bontempo**	Brazil	Midfielder	2025–present	37	3		
**Gabriel Brazão**	Brazil	Goalkeeper	2024–present	83	0		
Gabriel Carabajal	Argentina	Midfielder	2022–2023	12	1		
Gabriel Inocêncio	Brazil	Defender	2023	25	0		
Gabriel Magán	Argentina	Forward	1939	1	1		
Gabriel Pirani	Brazil	Midfielder	2021–2023	77	5		
Gabriel Veron	Brazil	Forward	2025	9	0		
Galego	Brazil	Forward	1945	3	1		
Gallo	Brazil	Midfielder	1992–1996	229	11		
Galo	Brazil	Forward	1985	4	0		
Galvão	Brazil	Forward	2006	9	0		
Gama	Brazil	Midfielder	1921–1923	32	2		
Garcia	Brazil	Defender	1933–1934	29	0		
Gaspar	Brazil	Forward	1969–1970;1972	7	0		
Gastão	Brazil	Forward	1917	2	1		
Gauchinho	Brazil	Forward	2000	1	0		
Gavião	Brazil	Midfielder	2005	7	0		
Geílson	Brazil	Forward	2005–2006	51	14		
Gengo	Brazil	Defender	1950	1	0		
George Lucas	Brazil	Defender	2009–2010	16	0		
Geraldão	Brazil	Defender	1940	1	0		
Geraldino	Brazil	Defender	1963–1966	212	2		
Geraldo Scotto	Brazil	Defender	1958	5	0		
Geraule	Brazil	Midfielder	1913	2	0		
Germano	Brazil	Midfielder	2009–2010	49	4		
Gersinho	Brazil	Forward	1983–1986	138	16		
Gérson	Brazil	Forward	1983–1984;1986	65	7		
Gérson Magrão	Brazil	Midfielder	2012	25	0		
Getúlio	Brazil	Defender	1957–1962	296	2		
Geuvânio	Brazil	Forward	2012–2015	114	24		
Giba	Brazil	Forward	1988	33	5		
Giba	Brazil	Defender	2005	5	0		
Giby	Brazil	Defender	1931;1933	13	3		
Gil	Brazil	Forward	2009	3	0		
Gil	Brazil	Defender	2024–2025	66	1		
Gilberto	Brazil	Midfielder	1950	1	0		
Gilberto	Brazil	Forward	1957	1	0		
Gilberto	Brazil	Forward	1965	6	1		
Gilberto	Brazil	Goalkeeper	1994–1996	26	0		
Gilberto Sorriso	Brazil	Defender	1977–1979;1981–1984;1985	307	10		
Gilmar	Brazil	Goalkeeper	1962–1969	331	0		
Gilmar	Brazil	Defender	1981–1982	4	0		
Gilmar	Brazil	Defender	1986	12	0		
Gilmar	Brazil	Midfielder	2006	6	0		
Gilmar Pipoca	Brazil	Midfielder	1990	20	4		
Gilson	Brazil	Forward	1981	22	3		
Gilson	Brazil	Defender	1992	7	0		
Gilson Beija-Flor	Brazil	Forward	1974	12	1		
Gilson Porto	Brazil	Forward	1965	3	1		
Gilvan	Brazil	Forward	1975	10	0		
Gilvandro	Brazil	Defender	1957	3	0		
Gino	Brazil	Forward	1950	1	0		
Giovanni	Brazil	Forward	1994–1996;2005–2006;2010	142	73		
Giuliano	Brazil	Midfielder	2024	36	12		
Giva	Brazil	Forward	2013–2014	32	6		
Gláucio	Brazil	Forward	1991	16	0		
Glauco	Brazil	Midfielder	1987	16	0		
Gloch	Brazil	Defender	1933–1934	6	0		
Góis	Brazil	Midfielder	1950;1952	8	0		
Gomes	Brazil	Goalkeeper	1993	11	0		
Gonçalo	Brazil	Midfielder	1964–1965	14	0		
Gonçalves	Brazil	Forward	1950	3	1		
**Gonzalo Escobar**	Argentina	Defender	2024–present	75	1		
Gradim	Brazil	Defender	1936–1944	271	95		
Gregore	Brazil	Midfielder	2016–2017	1	0		
Gueguê	Brazil	Midfielder	1953–1955;1958	25	0		
Guerra	Brazil	Forward	1957–1959	45	20		
Guga	Brazil	Forward	1992–1994	156	74		
Guilherme	Brazil	Midfielder	1942–1944	44	11		
Guilherme	Brazil	Forward	2024–2025	94	27		
Guilherme Nunes	Brazil	Midfielder	2018–2021	13	0		
Guilherme Santos	Brazil	Defender	2013	11	0		
Guimarães	Brazil	Forward	1954–1955	2	0		
**Gustavo Caballero**	Paraguay	Forward	2025–present	12	1		
Gustavo Henrique	Brazil	Defender	2011–2019	222	13		
Gustavo Nery	Brazil	Defender	1995–1996;1998–1999	81	8		
Halisson	Brazil	Defender	2005	37	3		
Hamilton	Brazil	Forward	1951–1952	11	4		
Harold Cross	Ireland	Forward	1912–1913	11	4		
Haroldo Domingues	Brazil	Forward	1912–1915;1917–1921;1927	74	57		
Haroldo Silva	Brazil	Defender	1968–1970	20	0		
Haroldo Sombra	Brazil	Defender	1963–1967	114	0		
Harry	Brazil	Forward	1938	1	0		
Hayner	Brazil	Defender	2024	37	1		
Heleno	Brazil	Midfielder	2005–2006	44	0		
Hélio	Brazil	Forward	1988	8	1		
Hélio Canjica	Brazil	Forward	1958–1959	45	17		
Hélio Leite	Brazil	Midfielder	1942	8	1		
Hélio Pires	Brazil	Forward	1973	14	0		
Helmiton	Brazil	Defender	1962–1963	15	0		
Hélvio	Brazil	Defender	1949–1959	425	1		
Hemédio	Brazil	Forward	1942	12	7		
Hemetério Diez	Uruguay	Midfielder	1944	4	0		
Henrique	Brazil	Forward	1946	2	0		
Henrique	Brazil	Forward	1990	3	0		
Henrique	Brazil	Midfielder	2011–2012	71	2		
Henrique Dourado	Brazil	Forward	2013	4	0		
Heraldo	Brazil	Defender	1988–1989	80	9		
Heriberto	Brazil	Midfielder	1989	21	3		
Hermes	Brazil	Defender	1934	2	0		
Hermes	Brazil	Defender	1973–1974	89	1		
Heródoto	Brazil	Forward	1921	8	0		
Herrera	Uruguay	Forward	1935	1	0		
Holl	Brazil	Forward	1929	1	0		
Hudson	Brazil	Midfielder	2007–2008	6	0		
Hugo	Brazil	Defender	1923–1932	69	0		
Hugo	Brazil	Midfielder	1952–1955	69	41		
Hugo de León	Uruguay	Defender	1986–1987	54	2		
Humberto	Brazil	Midfielder	1984–1985	96	11		
**Hyan**	Brazil	Midfielder	2024–present	3	0		
Iaponan	Brazil	Forward	1976	4	0		
Ibrahim	Brazil	Midfielder	1970–1972	15	0		
Ibson	Brazil	Midfielder	2011–2012	48	4		
Idiarte	Brazil	Defender	1945	9	0		
Ignácio	Brazil	Forward	1982	2	0		
Ignacio Laquintana	Uruguay	Forward	2024	11	0		
**Igor Vinícius**	Brazil	Defender	2016–2017;2025–present	20	0		
Ijuí	Brazil	Defender	1986–1988	118	2		
Índio	Brazil	Defender	1990–1994	247	11		
Imperador	Brazil	Goalkeeper	1936	1	0		
Inglês	Brazil	Midfielder	1940–1941	24	0		
Iracino	Brazil	Defender	1935	3	0		
Íris	Brazil	Midfielder	1964–1965	2	0		
Irno	Brazil	Goalkeeper	1960–1961	16	0		
Ismael	Brazil	Defender	1962–1965	90	0		
Ismael	Brazil	Forward	1967	6	0		
Ita	Brazil	Defender	1993	4	0		
Ítalo	Brazil	Forward	1936–1937	23	5		
Ivan	Brazil	Defender	1950–1957	253	10		
Ivonei	Brazil	Midfielder	2020–2021;2023	39	1		
Jacó	Brazil	Forward	1950	8	0		
Jader	Brazil	Forward	1971–1972	51	9		
Jaílson	Brazil	Defender	2003–2004	4	1		
Jaime	Brazil	Midfielder	1941	4	0		
Jaime Bôni	Brazil	Defender	1985	42	0		
Jair Bala	Brazil	Forward	1969	12	1		
Jair Cunha	Brazil	Defender	2023–2024	24	0		
Jair da Costa	Brazil	Midfielder	1972–1974	57	11		
Jair Estevão	Brazil	Goalkeeper	1969	8	0		
Jair Rosa Pinto	Brazil	Midfielder	1956–1960	195	34		
Jairo	Brazil	Defender	1992	13	0		
Jamelli	Brazil	Forward	1995–1996	120	30		
James Calvert	England	Midfielder	1920	1	0		
Jandrei	Brazil	Goalkeeper	2021	1	0		
Jango	Brazil	Midfielder	1935–1936	39	1		
Jarbas	Brazil	Midfielder	1916–1921	86	10		
Jathyl	Brazil	Forward	1917	5	3		
Jaú	Brazil	Defender	1944	23	0		
Jean	Brazil	Defender	1995–2001	142	6		
Jean Carlos	Brazil	Forward	2009	7	1		
Jean Lucas	Brazil	Midfielder	2019;2023	42	0		
Jefferson Café	Brazil	Midfielder	2010	3	0		
Jean Mota	Brazil	Midfielder	2016–2021	258	20		
Jerri	Brazil	Midfielder	2003–2004	30	7		
Jesus	Brazil		1914	2	0		
Jhojan Julio	Ecuador	Midfielder	2022	21	1		
Jhonnathan	Brazil	Defender	2021	4	0		
Joane	Brazil	Midfielder	1944	3	1		
**João Basso**	Brazil	Defender	2023;2024–present	34	3		
João Carlos	Brazil	Defender	1962–1964	12	0		
João Fumaça	Brazil	Forward	1997	14	5		
João Lucas	Brazil	Defender	2023	30	0		
João Paulo	Brazil	Forward	1977–1983;1992	412	103		
João Paulo	Brazil	Forward	1974	2	0		
João Paulo	Brazil	Goalkeeper	2016–2025	235	0		
João Pedro	Brazil	Midfielder	2012	10	0		
João Pinto	Brazil	Midfielder	1949–1950	3	0		
João Roberto	Brazil	Goalkeeper	1986	1	0		
**João Schmidt**	Brazil	Midfielder	2024–present	94	4		
Joãozinho	Brazil	Midfielder	1920	1	0		
Joãozinho	Brazil	Goalkeeper	1943–1944	10	0		
Joãozinho	Brazil	Defender	1977–1983	299	14		
Joaquim	Brazil	Defender	2023–2024	66	5		
Jobson	Brazil	Midfielder	2019–2022	44	3		
Joel	Brazil	Goalkeeper	1944–1946	70	0		
Joel	Brazil	Forward	1954	8	2		
Joel	Cameroon	Forward	2016	37	7		
Joel Camargo	Brazil	Defender	1963–1970	303	5		
Joel Mendes	Brazil	Goalkeeper	1970–1972;1975	98	0		
John	Brazil	Goalkeeper	2016;2018;2020–2022	29	0		
Jonas	Brazil	Forward	2006–2007	59	10		
Jonathan	Brazil	Defender	2011	20	2		
Jonathan Copete	Colombia	Forward	2016–2019;2021	140	26		
Jorge	Brazil	Defender	2019	35	2		
Jorge Eduardo	Brazil	Forward	2014	11	0		
Jorge Fucile	Uruguay	Defender	2012	14	1		
Jorge Luis	Brazil	Midfielder	1983	2	0		
Jorge Trombada	Brazil	Defender	1961	12	0		
Jorginho	Brazil	Forward	1945–1946	33	17		
Jorginho	Brazil	Midfielder	1989	12	1		
Jorginho	Brazil	Midfielder	1998–1999	80	17		
Jorginho Maravilha	Brazil	Forward	1976–1977	19	2		
**JP Chermont**	Brazil	Defender	2024–present	50	2		
José Agnelli	Argentina	Defender	1940	2	0		
José Dacunto	Argentina	Defender	1946–1947	62	0		
José Caballero	Spain	Goalkeeper	1938–1941	67	0		
José Lengyl	Hungary	Goalkeeper	1941–1942	11	0		
José María Sosa	Argentina	Midfielder	1940	17	1		
José Ramos Delgado	Argentina	Defender	1967–1973	321	1		
Jószef Strauss	Hungary	Forward	1930–1934	12	4		
Juan	Brazil	Defender	2012	42	2		
Juan Carlos Henao	Colombia	Goalkeeper	2005	13	0		
Juan Cazares	Ecuador	Midfielder	2024	14	1		
Juan Echevarrieta	Argentina	Forward	1942–1943	25	20		
Juan José Negri	Argentina	Midfielder	1955–1956	17	4		
Juan Soler	Argentina	Defender	1944	11	2		
Juarez	Brazil	Midfielder	1953	1	0		
Juari	Brazil	Forward	1996–1997	17	1		
Juary	Brazil	Forward	1976–1979;1989	229	101		
Jubal	Brazil	Defender	2013–2015	23	1		
Julien Fauvel	France	Goalkeeper	1912–1913	4	0		
Julinho	Brazil	Forward	1976	7	3		
Júlio	Brazil	Midfielder	1923–1924;1926–1932	126	6		
Júlio César	Brazil	Forward	2000–2003	58	5		
Julio Furch	Argentina	Forward	2023–2024	63	9		
Julio Manzur	Paraguay	Defender	2006	51	2		
Júlio Sérgio	Brazil	Goalkeeper	2002–2004	60	0		
Jundiahy	Brazil	Midfielder	1929	1	0		
Juninho	Brazil	Forward	1961	1	1		
Juninho	Brazil	Forward	2006–2007	4	1		
Juninho Parmigiani	Brazil	Midfielder	1985–1989	166	18		
Júnior	Brazil	Defender	1991–1995	161	3		
Júnior Caiçara	Brazil	Defender	2023	5	0		
Junqueira	Brazil	Midfielder	1916–1918	14	0		
Junqueirinha	Brazil	Forward	1935–1936	32	12		
Jurandir	Brazil	Forward	1975	13	1		
Jussiê	Brazil	Forward	1986	8	1		
Juvenal	Brazil	Goalkeeper	1913	1	0		
Juvenal	Brazil	Midfielder	1936	1	0		
Juvenal	Brazil	Forward	1949	28	17		
Kaiky	Brazil	Defender	2021–2022	54	2		
Kaio Jorge	Brazil	Forward	2018–2021	84	17		
Kalu	Brazil	Forward	1977	11	1		
Kaneco	Brazil	Forward	1968;1970	17	1		
Karl Wolf	Germany	Forward	1928–1929	5	7		
Kayke	Brazil	Forward	2017	43	9		
Kazu Miura	Japan	Midfielder	1986;1990	35	4		
Keirrison	Brazil	Forward	2010–2011	32	10		
Kennedy Nagoli	Zimbabwe	Midfielder	1995–1996	13	2		
Kevin Malthus	Brazil	Midfielder	2021	11	1		
Kevyson	Brazil	Defender	2023–2025	24	0		
Kiko	Brazil	Midfielder	1995–1996	9	0		
Kléber	Brazil	Defender	2005–2009	181	14		
Kléber Pereira	Brazil	Forward	2007–2009	143	86		
Laércio	Brazil	Goalkeeper	1957–1969	337	0		
Laércio	Brazil	Defender	2020–2021	16	1		
Laerte	Brazil	Forward	1933	1	1		
Lafayete	Brazil	Defender	1952	11	0		
Lairton	Brazil	Forward	1971	10	5		
Lalá	Brazil	Goalkeeper	1959–1961	55	0		
Lanzudo	Brazil	Midfielder	1951	3	0		
Laurindo	Brazil	Midfielder	1938–1940	53	1		
Laurindo Vaz	Brazil	Midfielder	1946	2	0		
**Lautaro Díaz**	Argentina	Forward	2025–present	14	3		
Lazinho	Brazil	Defender	1975–1976	10	0		
Leacir	Brazil	Forward	1972	1	0		
Leal	Brazil	Midfielder	1954–1955	10	0		
Leandrinho	Brazil	Midfielder	2012–2016	65	1		
Leandro Machado	Brazil	Forward	2004	4	0		
Leandro	Brazil	Forward	1988–1989	12	0		
Leandro	Brazil	Defender	2001–2002;2004–2005	9	0		
Leandro	Brazil	Forward	2015	14	1		
Leandro Damião	Brazil	Forward	2014	44	11		
Leandro Donizete	Brazil	Midfielder	2017–2018	23	0		
Leandro Machado	Brazil	Forward	2004	6	0		
Leandro Rodrigues	Brazil	Forward	2006	12	1		
Leandro Silva	Brazil	Defender	2011	4	0		
Lello	Brazil	Defender	2004	10	0		
Léo	Brazil	Midfielder	1993	1	0		
Léo	Brazil	Defender	1997	1	0		
Léo	Brazil	Defender	2000–2005;2009–2014;2016	456	24		
Léo Baptistão	Brazil	Forward	2021–2022	38	7		
Léo Cittadini	Brazil	Midfielder	2013–2018	81	2		
Leo Godoy	Argentina	Defender	2025	18	1		
Léo Lima	Brazil	Midfielder	2005–2006	40	7		
Léo Oliveira	Brazil	Midfielder	1969–1976	426	46		
Léo Paraibano	Brazil	Defender	1977	26	1		
Leonaldo	Brazil	Midfielder	1946–1948	40	7		
Leonardo	Brazil	Defender	2004–2005;2007;2015	40	0		
Leonardo Manzi	Brazil	Forward	1988–1989	28	3		
Leônidas	Brazil	Forward	1951	1	0		
Leonídio	Brazil	Goalkeeper	1946–1952	66	0		
Leopoldo Luque	Argentina	Forward	1983	5	0		
Lico	Brazil	Defender	1991	3	0		
Lima	Brazil	Defender	1961–1971	692	63		
Lima	Brazil	Forward	1985	51	22		
Lima	Brazil	Forward	2008	26	2		
Lino	Brazil	Forward	1979	1	0		
Lino	Brazil	Midfielder	1983–1985	150	29		
Livio	Brazil	Midfielder	1979	7	0		
Loca	Brazil	Forward	1987;1990	5	0		
Logu	Brazil	Forward	1931–1935	110	56		
Longobardi	Brazil	Goalkeeper	1922–1924	21	0		
Lopes	Brazil	Forward	2004	17	1		
Lua	Brazil	Forward	1959	3	2		
Luan	Brazil	Midfielder	2022	8	1		
Luan Dias	Brazil	Midfielder	2023	8	0		
**Luan Peres**	Brazil	Defender	2019–2021;2024–present	130	1		
Luca Meirelles	Brazil	Forward	2024–2025	17	0		
Lucas Barbosa	Brazil	Midfielder	2021–2023	65	7		
Lucas Braga	Brazil	Forward	2020–2024	202	18		
Lucas Crispim	Brazil	Forward	2015–2016	14	0		
Lucas Lima	Brazil	Midfielder	2014–2017;2023	253	21		
Lucas Lourenço	Brazil	Midfielder	2018–2021	34	0		
Lucas Otávio	Brazil	Midfielder	2013–2016	31	0		
Lucas Pires	Brazil	Defender	2022–2023	69	0		
Lucas Venuto	Brazil	Forward	2019–2021	8	0		
Lucas Veríssimo	Brazil	Defender	2016–2021	188	7		
Luciano	Brazil	Midfielder	1994	12	1		
Luciano Carlos	Brazil	Defender	1994	10	0		
Luciano Castan	Brazil	Defender	2010	2	0		
Luciano Henrique	Brazil	Forward	2005–2006	26	3		
Lúcio	Brazil	Midfielder	1998–1999	65	9		
Lúcio Flávio	Brazil	Midfielder	2009	13	1		
Luís	Brazil	Goalkeeper	1952–1954	15	0		
Luís Augusto	Brazil	Midfielder	2004–2005	36	0		
Luis Bolaños	Ecuador	Forward	2009	9	0		
Luis Carlos	Brazil	Defender	1988–1993	218	8		
Luis Carlos	Brazil	Midfielder	1996	1	0		
Luís Carlos	Brazil	Forward	1987	29	12		
Luís Carlos Feijão	Brazil	Forward	1969–1970	20	1		
Luís Cláudio	Brazil	Forward	1962–1963	8	0		
Luis Gustavo	Brazil	Midfielder	1982–1984	48	2		
Luis Menutti	Argentina	Forward	1938	3	1		
Luís Müller	Brazil	Midfielder	1995	6	1		
Luisão	Brazil	Defender	2025	9	0		
Luisinho	Brazil	Defender	1987–1989	81	3		
Luisinho	Brazil	Midfielder	2004	3	0		
Luiz	Brazil	Defender	1946	1	0		
Luiz Alberto	Brazil	Defender	2005–2006	76	9		
Luiz Carlos Beleza	Brazil	Defender	1974–1975	11	0		
Luiz Cláudio	Brazil	Midfielder	1989–1991	15	0		
Luiz Felipe	Brazil	Defender	2016–2023	172	5		
Luiz Henrique	Brazil	Midfielder	2008	2	0		
Luiz Roberto	Brazil	Goalkeeper	1982	2	0		
Luizão	Brazil	Forward	1981	9	0		
Luizão	Brazil	Forward	2005–2006	6	0		
Luizinho	Brazil	Forward	1991	22	3		
Luizinho	Brazil	Defender	2009	37	1		
Luizinho	Brazil	Midfielder	2021	2	0		
Lula	Brazil	Midfielder	1946	1	0		
Lula	Brazil	Defender	1988	6	0		
Lula	Brazil	Defender	1993	10	0		
Lulu	Brazil	Midfielder	1944	2	0		
Lupércio	Brazil	Forward	1942–1943	18	7		
Luvanor	Brazil	Midfielder	1988	17	0		
Luz	Brazil	Forward	1949–1950	2	0		
Macedo	Brazil	Forward	1994–1999	228	61		
Machado	Brazil	Forward	1913	1	0		
Madasi	Brazil	Goalkeeper	1921–1922	7	0		
Madeira	Brazil	Forward	1949–1950	4	0		
Madson	Brazil	Midfielder	2009–2010	111	19		
Madson	Brazil	Defender	2020–2022	127	13		
Magalhães	Brazil	Forward	1932–1933	3	0		
Magnones	Brazil	Midfielder	1943	25	5		
Magnum	Brazil	Midfielder	2006	24	4		
Maicon	Brazil	Defender	2022–2023	42	0		
Maikon Leite	Brazil	Midfielder	2008–2011		44	11	
Maneco	Brazil	Defender	1962–1963	6	0		
Manga	Brazil	Goalkeeper	1951–1959	402	0		
Mano	Brazil	Goalkeeper	1986	15	0		
Manoel	Brazil	Forward	1958	1	0		
Manoel Maria	Brazil	Forward	1968–1973;1976	174	34		
Macaraí	Brazil	Forward	1946–1948	26	10		
Maranhão	Brazil	Defender	2010;2012	46	4		
Marçal	Brazil	Forward	1934;1936–1938	11	1		
Marçal	Brazil	Defender	1968–1973;1975–1977	208	1		
Marcão	Brazil	Defender	2002	3	0		
Marcel	Brazil	Forward	2010	35	9		
Marcelinho	Brazil	Forward	2024	5	0		
Marcelinho Carioca	Brazil	Midfielder	2001	15	5		
Marcelinho Paraíba	Brazil	Midfielder	1994	15	1		
Marcelino	Brazil	Defender	1958	4	0		
Marcelo	Brazil	Forward	1987	2	0		
Marcelo	Brazil	Defender	2007–2008	66	3		
Marcelo Fernandes	Brazil	Defender	1992–1995	83	4		
Marcelo Martelotte	Brazil	Goalkeeper	1997	16	0		
Marcelo Moura	Brazil	Defender	1995	25	1		
Marcelo Passos	Brazil	Midfielder	1991–1997	162	39		
Marcelo Paulino	Brazil	Midfielder	1991	2	0		
Marcelo Peabiru	Brazil	Forward	2003	11	1		
Marcelo Silva	Brazil	Defender	1995	16	0		
Marcelo Silva	Brazil	Midfielder	1999–2002	60	5		
Marcelo Veiga	Brazil	Defender	1990–1992	97	0		
Marcelo Torres	Argentina	Midfielder	1934	14	0		
Marcinho	Brazil	Midfielder	2004	36	1		
Marcinho Guerreiro	Brazil	Midfielder	2008	29	3		
Márcio Careca	Brazil	Defender	2004	9	0		
Márcio Fernandes	Brazil	Forward	1979–1982;1984	55	2		
Márcio Griggio	Brazil	Midfielder	1993	26	3		
Márcio Rosssini	Brazil	Defender	1980–1985;1990	278	15		
Márcio Santos	Brazil	Defender	2000	16	0		
Marco Antonio	Brazil	Forward	1978	9	3		
Marco Antônio Cipó	Brazil	Midfielder	1987–1989	56	2		
Marco Aurélio	Brazil	Defender	2004	12	0		
Marcos	Brazil	Forward	1973	3	0		
Marcos Adriano	Brazil	Defender	1995–1996	71	2		
Marcos Assunção	Brazil	Midfielder	1996–1999;2013	123	24		
Marcos Aurélio	Brazil	Forward	2007	64	14		
Marcos Bazílio	Brazil	Midfielder	1995;1997–1999	99	0		
Marcos Guilherme	Brazil	Forward	2021–2022	73	8		
Marcos Leonardo	Brazil	Forward	2020–2023	167	54		
Marcos Lira	Brazil	Forward	1991	5	0		
Marcos Paulo	Brazil	Defender	1993–1996	66	2		
Mariano Trípodi	Argentina	Forward	2008	15	1		
Marinho	Brazil	Forward	2019–2021	113	41		
Marinho Peres	Brazil	Defender	1973–1974	74	5		
Mário	Brazil	Forward	1923	1	1		
Mário	Brazil		1941	1	0		
Mário	Brazil	Midfielder	1960	16	2		
Mario Evaristo	Argentina	Forward	1938	1	0		
Mário Pereira	Brazil	Forward	1935–1938	40	24		
Mário Seixas	Brazil	Midfielder	1930–1936	113	68		
Mário Sérgio	Brazil	Midfielder	1984–1986	80	9		
Mário Válter	Brazil	Defender	1976	13	0		
Maroim	Brazil	Forward	1933–1934	18	15		
Marolla	Brazil	Goalkeeper	1979–1983;1985	282	0		
Marquinho	Brazil	Midfielder	1987	12	0		
Marquinhos	Brazil	Midfielder	2010	57	8		
Marquinhos	Brazil	Midfielder	1995	9	1		
Marquinhos Capixaba	Brazil	Defender	1995	19	1		
Marquinhos Gabriel	Brazil	Midfielder	2015	44	9		
Marteletti	Brazil	Midfielder	1935–1938	92	1		
Martini	Brazil	Defender	1952	1	0		
Martins	Brazil	Forward	1919–1923	30	2		
Masakiyo Maezono	Japan	Midfielder	1998	5	1		
Mascrinha	Brazil	Midfielder	1940	3	0		
Massarão	Brazil	Forward	1941	5	1		
**Mateus Xavier**	Brazil	Forward	2024–present	5	0		
Matheus	Brazil	Goalkeeper	2002–2003	2	0		
Matheus Ferraz	Brazil	Defender	2005	4	0		
Matheus Jesus	Brazil	Midfielder	2017–2018	14	0		
Matheus Nolasco	Brazil	Forward	2016–2017	4	0		
Matheus Oliveira	Brazil	Midfielder	2016–2019	3	0		
Matheus Ribeiro	Brazil	Defender	2017–2019	15	0		
Matías Lacava	Venezuela	Midfielder	2021	2	0		
Matt Okoh	United States	Midfielder	1995	0	0		
Mattos	Brazil	Forward	1930	1	0		
Maurício	Brazil	Defender	1984;1986	16	0		
Mauricio	Brazil		1988	1	0		
Maurício	Brazil	Goalkeeper	1993	28	0		
Maurício Copertino	Brazil	Defender	1993–1995	72	1		
Mauricio Molina	Colombia	Midfielder	2008–2009	78	17		
Maurinho	Brazil	Defender	2002	30	0		
Mauro	Brazil	Goalkeeper	1979	2	0		
Mauro	Brazil	Forward	1986	6	1		
Mauro	Brazil	Goalkeeper	2004–2005	65	0		
Mauro Campos	Brazil	Defender	1981–1982	49	2		
Mauro Marques	Brazil	Goalkeeper	1954	1	0		
Mauro Patrício	Brazil	Defender	1981–1982	22	0		
Mauro Ramos	Brazil	Defender	1960–1967	352	0		
Mauro Torres	Brazil	Defender	1957	20	0		
Max	Brazil	Goalkeeper	1924	1	0		
Max	Brazil	Goalkeeper	1943	4	0		
Maxi Rolón	Argentina	Midfielder	2016	5	0		
Maximiliano Silvera	Uruguay	Forward	2023	12	1		
**Mayke**	Brazil	Defender	2025–present	12	0		
Mazinho	Brazil	Forward	1984–1987	55	5		
Mazinho Bueno	Brazil	Forward	1973–1976	126	15		
Mazinho Oliveira	Brazil	Forward	1971–1972	34	9		
Meira I	Brazil	Defender	1928–1929				
Meira II	Brazil	Defender	1926–1928;1930	7	0		
Meira III	Brazil	Defender	1932–1937	111	0		
Melão	Brazil	Forward	1957	2	2		
Mendes	Brazil	Forward	1934	17	11		
Mengálvio	Brazil	Midfielder	1960–1969	369	28		
Mendonça	Brazil	Midfielder	1987–1988	110	28		
Mendonça	Brazil	Forward	1990	24	4		
Mendonça	Brazil	Forward	1991	11	0		
Messias	Brazil	Midfielder	1998	15	2		
Messias	Brazil	Defender	2023–2024	44	3		
Michael	Brazil	Forward	2008	19	1		
Michael Quiñónez	Ecuador	Midfielder	2008	16	1		
Michel	Brazil	Defender	1997;1999–2003	127	1		
Miguel	Brazil	Midfielder	1953	1	0		
Miguel Leite	Brazil		1932	1	0		
Miguel Terceros	Bolivia	Midfielder	2022–2025	18	0		
Miller	Brazil	Forward	1919;1921–1923	30	6		
Miltinho	Brazil	Midfielder	1955	2	0		
Miltinho	Brazil	Forward	1988	2	0		
Milton	Brazil	Forward	1945–1946	3	0		
Miranda	Brazil	Forward	1954	9	0		
Mirandinha	Brazil	Forward	1985	11	14		
Miro	Brazil	Midfielder	1936	1	1		
Miro	Brazil	Midfielder	1980–1981	60	5		
Moacyr de Morais	Brazil	Midfielder	1942	4	0		
Moacyr Prado	Brazil	Midfielder	1933;1936–1937	23	0		
Mococa	Brazil	Midfielder	1981	21	0		
Modesto	Brazil	Defender	1964–1966	63	0		
Moisés	Brazil	Forward	1991;1994	6	1		
Moisés	Brazil	Forward	2010–2011	5	0		
Montenegro	Brazil	Midfielder	1912	2	0		
Moraes	Brazil	Forward	2007–2008	26	4		
Moraes	Brazil	Defender	2021	15	0		
Moran	Brazil	Midfielder	1931–1940	141	27		
Moreira	Brazil	Defender	1971	18	0		
Mota I	Brazil	Midfielder	1940	15	7		
Mota	Brazil	Forward	1940–1941;1943–1945	24	4		
Mourão	Brazil	Forward	1918–1920	8	0		
Mourão	Brazil	Defender	1957–1959	104	1		
Müller	Brazil	Forward	1997–1998	71	26		
Múrias	Brazil	Defender	1972–1973	17	0		
Musashi Mizushima	Japan	Forward	1988	1	0		
Nabor	Brazil	Defender	1926	2	0		
Nadson	Brazil	Defender	2005	1	0		
Nailson	Brazil	Defender	2014	3	0		
Naldo	Brazil	Midfielder	1954–1955	5	0		
Nando	Brazil	Forward	1949–1953	57	18		
Nando	Brazil	Goalkeeper	1994;1996–1999	7	0		
Narciso	Brazil	Goalkeeper	1954	1	0		
Narciso	Brazil	Midfielder	1994–1998;2003–2004	266	11		
Nascimento	Brazil	Defender	1937	1	0		
Natal	Brazil	Defender	1940–1941	11	0		
Nathan Santos	Brazil	Defender	2022–2023	33	0		
Natinho	Brazil	Forward	1929;1931–1932	9	6		
Neca	Brazil	Midfielder	1916	2	0		
Neca	Brazil	Forward	1946	2	0		
Neco	Brazil	Forward	1969	1	1		
Neco	Brazil	Forward	1974	1	0		
Nego	Brazil	Midfielder	1952	1	1		
Negreiros	Brazil	Forward	1933–1934	19	10		
Negreiros	Brazil	Midfielder	1967–1972	123	12		
Negrito	Brazil	Forward	1939	1	0		
Nei	Brazil	Goalkeeper	1999–2000	8	0		
Nei	Brazil	Defender	1992	16	0		
Neilton	Brazil	Forward	2013	20	4		
Neizinho	Brazil	Forward	1993–1994	78	17		
Nélio Neves	Brazil	Forward	1942–1944	7	2		
Nelsi	Brazil	Midfielder	1973–1975	55	1		
Nelsinho Baptista	Brazil	Defender	1977–1981	229	10		
Nelson	Brazil	Goalkeeper	1940	1	0		
Nelson Adams	Brazil	Midfielder	1953	15	1		
Nelson Borges	Brazil	Midfielder	1978–1979	43	3		
Nelson Cuevas	Paraguay	Forward	2008	17	2		
Nelson Tapia	Chile	Goalkeeper	2004	18	0		
Nena	Brazil	Defender	1985	2	0		
Nenê	Brazil	Defender	1943–1954	395	1		
Nenê	Brazil	Midfielder	1960–1963	45	19		
Nenê	Brazil	Defender	1989	6	0		
Nenê	Brazil	Defender	1994	2	0		
Nenê	Brazil	Midfielder	2003	39	12		
Nenê Belarmino	Brazil	Forward	1969–1974	226	61		
Neném	Brazil	Defender	2003	10	0		
Nenucho	Brazil	Defender	1930	1	0		
Nerino	Brazil	Forward	1923	12	3		
Nery	Brazil	Forward	1936	1	0		
Netinho	Brazil	Forward	1923	1	0		
Neto	Brazil	Defender	1976–1982	224	1		
Neto	Brazil	Forward	1993	5	0		
Neto	Brazil	Forward	1994	18	3		
Neto	Brazil	Defender	2006–2007	23	0		
Neto	Brazil	Defender	2013–2014	41	1		
Neto Berola	Brazil	Forward	2015–2016	28	2		
Neves	Brazil	Defender	1935–1942	230	13		
Newton	Brazil	Forward	1922	2	0		
Ney	Brazil	Defender	1975–1976	35	0		
Ney Bala	Brazil	Forward	1990	18	4		
Ney Blanco	Brazil	Midfielder	1953;1957;1960–1961	85	14		
**Neymar**	Brazil	Forward	2009–2013;2025–present	260	150		
Nico	Brazil	Forward	1939	3	1		
Nicácio	Brazil	Forward	1949–1955	174	62		
Nilceu	Brazil	Forward	1957	1	0		
Nildo	Brazil	Defender	1986–1989	141	4		
Nilmar	Brazil	Forward	2017	2	0		
Nilo	Brazil	Forward	1912–1914	9	3		
Nilo	Brazil	Defender	1966	1	0		
Nilson	Brazil	Forward	2015	16	1		
Nilson Dias	Brazil	Forward	1981–1983	42	4		
Nilton	Brazil	Midfielder	1946	1	0		
Nilton	Brazil	Goalkeeper	1985;1987–1993	87	0		
Nílton Batata	Brazil	Forward	1976–1980	249	36		
Nilzo	Brazil	Forward	1963	5	3		
Nívio	Brazil	Defender	1953	1	0		
Nobre	Brazil	Goalkeeper	1941–1942	19	0		
Nonato	Brazil	Midfielder	2023–2024	22	1		
Nono	Brazil	Forward	1950	1	0		
Norberto	Brazil	Midfielder	1937	2	0		
Noriva	Brazil	Forward	1964–1966	15	2		
Novo	Argentina	Forward	1938	2	0		
Nunes	Brazil	Forward	1985	18	5		
Oberdan	Brazil	Defender	1965–1969;1971–1972;1974–1975	335	8		
Óca	Brazil	Goalkeeper	1981	2	0		
Octávio	Brazil	Forward	1937	22	9		
Octávio	Brazil	Forward	1952–1953;1955	22	15		
Odair	Brazil	Goalkeeper	1942–1943	25	0		
Odair	Brazil	Goalkeeper	1961	1	0		
Odair Titica	Brazil	Midfielder	1943–1952	223	135		
Odilon	Brazil	Midfielder	1952	2	0		
Odorico Ratto	Brazil	Goalkeeper	1916–1917	22	0		
Odvan	Brazil	Defender	2002	17	3		
Olavo	Brazil	Defender	1951–1952	33	0		
Olavo	Brazil	Defender	1961–1965	95	2		
Oliva	Brazil	Defender	1922–1924	22	0		
Olyntho	Brazil	Midfielder	1919–1920;1922–1923	10	0		
Omar	Brazil	Forward	1923–1932	145	23		
Orestes	Brazil	Forward	1941	1	0		
Orestes	Brazil	Defender	2001	8	0		
Orinho	Brazil	Defender	2017–2019	10	0		
Orlandinho	Brazil	Forward	1967–1968	8	1		
Orlando	Brazil	Forward	1931	1	0		
Orlando Pereira	Brazil	Defender	1970–1972	141	7		
Orlando Peçanha	Brazil	Defender	1965–1968	137	0		
Orlando Pingo de Ouro	Brazil	Midfielder	1953–1954	6	1		
Orozimbo	Brazil	Midfielder	1943	3	0		
Oséas	Brazil	Forward	2002	11	3		
Oscar Bastos	Brazil	Midfielder	1912;1914–1917	35	0		
Osmarzinho	Brazil	Forward	1987	45	6		
Osni	Brazil	Forward	1970	2	0		
Osni de Oliveira	Brazil	Forward	1981	24	5		
Osny	Brazil	Goalkeeper	1946–1947	15	0		
Osvaldo	Brazil	Midfielder	1925–1926;1928–1932	110	1		
Osvaldo	Brazil	Forward	1961–1963	28	4		
Osvaldo	Brazil	Defender	1967	1	1		
Osvaldo	Brazil	Midfielder	1987	45	14		
Osvaldo Pérez	Argentina	Goalkeeper	1969	2	0		
Osvaldo Silveira	Brazil	Forward	1915;1917;1919;1921	20	12		
Oswaldo	Brazil	Defender	1942	14	0		
Oswaldo Pisoni	Brazil	Goalkeeper	1956–1957	9	0		
Otacílio	Brazil	Goalkeeper	1916	1	0		
Otacílio	Brazil	Forward	1935–1936	1	0		
Otacílio	Brazil	Forward	1944	4	1		
Otavio	Brazil	Defender	1977	4	1		
Otávio Augusto	Brazil	Forward	1996	3	0		
Overath Breitner	Venezuela	Midfielder	2010–2012	27	2		
Pagão	Brazil	Forward	1955–1963	340	155		
Pagani	Brazil	Defender	1983–1985	30	0		
Paim	Brazil	Midfielder		1	0		
País	Brazil	Goalkeeper	1979	24	0		
Paiva	Brazil	Forward	1926	1	0		
Palácio	Brazil	Forward	1958	2	0		
Palamonte	Brazil	Midfielder	1919	1	0		
Palhinha	Brazil	Forward	1981–1982	51	11		
Palmeira	Brazil	Midfielder	1925	1	0		
Pará	Brazil	Defender	2008–2012;2019–2021	291	3		
Paraguaio	Paraguay	Midfielder	1933	1	1		
Paraguaio	Brazil	Forward	1952	3	0		
Pardal	Brazil	Defender	1965	1	0		
Pascoal	Brazil	Defender	1948–1955	248	40		
Pascual Molinas	Argentina	Forward	1940	26	13		
Passos	Brazil	Forward	1927–1931	8	0		
Patesko	Brazil	Forward	1945	1	0		
Patito Cáceres	Paraguay	Forward	1969	12	3		
Patito Rodríguez	Argentina	Forward	2012–2014;2016	52	2		
Patrick	Brazil	Midfielder	2024–2025	11	0		
Patrik	Brazil	Midfielder	2008	1	0		
Paulinho	Brazil	Forward	1934–1935	24	1		
Paulinho	Brazil	Forward	1954	1	1		
Paulinho	Brazil	Defender	1975	8	0		
Paulinho	Brazil	Goalkeeper	1978–1979	4	0		
Paulinho	Brazil	Defender	1980–1982	89	2		
Paulinho	Brazil	Forward	2016	32	5		
Paulinho Batistote	Brazil	Forward	1982–1983	70	4		
Paulinho Fonseca	Brazil	Forward	1982	29	11		
Paulinho Kobayashi	Brazil	Forward	1994	57	16		
Paulinho McLaren	Brazil	Forward	1989–1992	141	57		
Paulino	Brazil	Defender	1921–1923	45	9		
Paulino	Brazil	Forward	1930	9	1		
Paulo	Brazil	Defender	2006–2007	5	0		
Paulo	Brazil	Midfielder	1942–1943	4	0		
Paulo Almeida	Brazil	Midfielder	2000–2004	164	0		
Paulo Bim	Brazil	Forward	1966	2	0		
Paulo Borges	Brazil	Forward	1983	7	0		
Paulo César	Brazil	Defender	2004–2005	99	3		
Paulo Davioli	Brazil	Defender	1968–1972;1974–1975	119	0		
Paulo Henrique	Brazil	Defender	2009	7	0		
Paulo Henrique	Brazil	Defender	2012–2013	6	0		
Paulo Henrique Ganso	Brazil	Midfielder	2008–2012	162	36		
Paulo Isidoro	Brazil	Midfielder	1983–1984	130	20		
Paulo Leme	Brazil	Midfielder	1982;1984–1986;1988	46	11		
Paulo Nani	Brazil	Forward	1975	9	0		
Paulo Ricardo	Brazil	Defender	2014–2016	20	0		
Paulo Rink	Germany	Forward	1999–2000	20	2		
Paulo Roberto	Brazil	Defender	1985	54	0		
Paulo Róbson	Brazil	Defender	1983–1987	167	4		
Paulo Vargas	Brazil		1987	2	0		
Pavão	Brazil	Defender	1959–1961	71	2		
Pavuna	Brazil	Midfielder	1936	1	0		
Pazzini	Brazil	Defender	1931	1	0		
Pedrinho	Brazil	Midfielder	1933	8	6		
Pedrinho	Brazil	Goalkeeper	1976	5	0		
Pedrinho	Brazil	Midfielder	2007	58	12		
Pedrinho	Brazil	Forward	2024	30	2		
Pedro Alves	Brazil	Defender	2007	19	3		
Pedro Cardoso	Brazil	Forward	1945	2	0		
Pedro Castro	Brazil	Midfielder	2012–2013	13	0		
Pedro Paulo	Brazil	Defender	1984–1987;1989–1992	200	10		
Peixe	Brazil	Forward	1942–1943	4	2		
Peixinho	Brazil	Forward	1964–1965	88	39		
Peixoto	Brazil	Forward	1947	1	0		
Pelé	Brazil	Forward	1956–1974;1975;1977	1116	1091		
Pelegrine	Brazil	Goalkeeper	1989	12	0		
Pepe	Brazil	Forward	1954–1969¤	741	403		
Pereira	Brazil	Midfielder	1913–1922	145	4		
Pereira	Brazil	Defender	2001–2004	82	2		
Peter Timko	Czech Republic	Goalkeeper	1952	1	0		
Petrone	Brazil	Forward	1929	1	0		
Petrônio	Brazil	Forward	1951	6	2		
Piá	Brazil	Midfielder	1996–1997;2000	29	0		
Piá Carioca	Brazil	Defender	1994–1995	19	0		
Picolé	Brazil	Forward	1969–1972	74	38		
Pierry	Brazil	Midfielder	1948;1950	6	1		
Pilar	Brazil	Defender	1913–1914	9	0		
Pinduca	Brazil	Defender	1958–1959	4	0		
Pinga	Brazil	Midfielder	2013	4	0		
Pinhegas	Brazil	Forward	1948–1951	93	37		
Pinheiro	Brazil	Defender	1930–1932	60	3		
Pinheiro	Brazil	Goalkeeper	1941	2	0		
Pintado	Brazil	Midfielder	1995	14	1		
Pita	Brazil	Midfielder	1977–1984	408	55		
Pintanella	Brazil	Defender	1936	1	0		
Piolim	Brazil	Midfielder	1938	1	0		
Pires	Brazil	Forward	1914	1	0		
Pirombá	Brazil	Forward	1943–1944;1946–1947	35	10		
Pitarelli	Brazil	Goalkeeper	2000–2001	29	0		
Piter	Brazil	Forward	1974	1	1		
Pitico	Brazil	Midfielder	1969–1973	59	2		
Pitocha	Brazil	Midfielder	1925–1926	5	2		
Pitola	Brazil	Defender	1946;1948	4	0		
Pizzeli	Brazil	Goalkeeper	1991	1	0		
Plínio	Brazil	Goalkeeper	1916	1	0		
Prestes	Brazil	Forward	1934	1	1		
Preto	Brazil	Defender	2000–2003;2005	126	2		
Preto Casagrande	Brazil	Midfielder	2004	41	5		
Prisco	Brazil	Forward	1930–1931	7	0		
Pupo	Brazil	Forward	1935	1	1		
Quinzinho	Brazil	Forward	1958	1	0		
Quirino	Brazil		1985	1	0		
Quito	Brazil	Defender	1965	2	0		
Rabeca	Brazil	Forward	1945	8	1		
Rached	Brazil	Forward	1979	2	0		
Rafael Andrade	Brazil	Goalkeeper	2001–2002	7	0		
Rafael Cabral	Brazil	Goalkeeper	2010–2013	194	0		
Rafael Caldeira	Brazil	Defender	2010–2012	5	1		
Rafael Galhardo	Brazil	Defender	2012–2013	28	2		
Rafael Longuine	Brazil	Midfielder	2015–2017	49	6		
Raimundinho	Brazil	Forward	1955–1958	30	2		
Ramiro	Brazil	Defender	1955–1959	250	2		
Ramon	Brazil	Midfielder	1934–1936	31	0		
Ramon	Uruguay	Midfielder	1936	1	0		
Ramón Mifflin	Peru	Midfielder	1974–1975	34	1		
Randolfo	Brazil	Goalkeeper	1918–1924	88	0		
Raniel	Brazil	Forward	2020–2021;2023	34	3		
Ranielli	Brazil	Midfielder	1991–1995	146	28		
Rato	Brazil	Forward	1941	12	6		
Ratto	Brazil	Midfielder	1919	1	0		
Raul	Brazil	Defender	1987–1988	35	1		
Raul	Brazil	Goalkeeper	1985–1986;1988	6	0		
Raul Cabral	Brazil	Forward	1933–1936;1939–1942	131	119		
Raymundo Marques	Brazil	Forward	1912–1913	3	1		
Reginaldo	Brazil	Forward	2008	1	0		
Reginaldo Araújo	Brazil	Defender	2003	38	0		
Reinaldo	Brazil	Forward	1976–1979	54	14		
Reinaldo	Brazil	Forward	2006	32	11		
Remo	Brazil	Midfielder	1938–1939	41	12		
Renan Mota	Brazil	Forward	2010–2011	2	0		
Renatinho	Brazil	Forward	2005–2008	49	8		
Renato	Brazil	Defender	1977	15	0		
Renato	Brazil	Midfielder	2000–2004;2014–2018	424	33		
Renato Abreu	Brazil	Midfielder	2013	9	1		
Renato Pimenta	Brazil	Midfielder	1922–1928	86	0		
Renê	Brazil	Forward	1938	1	1		
Renê	Brazil	Goalkeeper	1947	14	0		
Renê Júnior	Brazil	Midfielder	2013	38	0		
Renyer	Brazil	Forward	2020–2021	8	0		
Requena	Brazil	Midfielder	1981–1982	2	0		
Requião	Brazil	Forward	1924–1927;1929–1930;1932	26	6		
Ribamar	Brazil	Midfielder	1986–1987	53	8		
Ricardinho	Brazil	Midfielder	2004–2005	97	28		
Ricardo	Brazil	Midfielder	1913–1921	109	3		
Ricardo Bóvio	Brazil	Midfielder	2004–2006	80	1		
Ricardo Colombo	Brazil	Forward	1934	6	2		
Ricardo Goulart	China	Midfielder	2022	30	4		
Ricardo Oliveira	Brazil	Forward	2003;2015–2017	173	92		
Ricardo Rocha	Brazil	Defender	1993	17	0		
Ricardo Romera	Argentina	Goalkeeper	1976–1978	57	0		
Rildo	Brazil	Defender	1967–1972	325	11		
Rildo	Brazil	Forward	2014	41	4		
Rivaldo	Brazil	Midfielder	1976	1	0		
Rivaldo Barbosa	Brazil	Midfielder	2005	3	0		
Robert	Brazil	Midfielder	1995–1997;2000–2002	257	47		
Robertinho	Brazil	Goalkeeper	1948;1950–1951	37	0		
Roberto	Brazil	Midfielder	1930–1932	36	0		
Roberto	Brazil	Defender	1976	2	0		
Roberto Biônico	Brazil	Forward	1981	46	14		
Roberto Brum	Brazil	Midfielder	2008–2010	85	0		
Roberto Carlos	Brazil	Forward	1972	23	1		
Roberto César	Brazil	Forward	1982	21	4		
Roberto Silva	Brazil	Defender	1972–1974	29	0		
Robgol	Brazil	Forward	2004	17	6		
Robinho	Brazil	Forward	2002–2005;2010;2014–2015	253	111		
**Robinho Júnior**	Brazil	Forward	2025–present	15	0		
Róbson	Brazil	Midfielder	2008–2009;2011	60	6		
Robson Agondi	Brazil	Goalkeeper	1991;1994–1995	8	0		
Robson Bambu	Brazil	Defender	2018	13	0		
Róbson Luís	Brazil	Midfielder	1998	10	2		
Robson Reis	Brazil	Defender	2021	12	0		
Rocha	Brazil	Defender	1994	3	0		
Rodolfo Rodríguez	Uruguay	Goalkeeper	1984–1988	255	0		
Rodrigão	Brazil	Forward	1999–2001	54	20		
Rodrigão	Brazil	Forward	2016–2018	34	9		
Rodrigo Costa	Brazil	Defender	2001	2	0		
Rodrigo Fabri	Brazil	Midfielder	1999	20	1		
Rodrigo Fernández	Uruguay	Midfielder	2022–2023	83	2		
Rodrigo Ferreira	Brazil	Defender	2024	21	0		
Rodrigo Mancha	Brazil	Midfielder	2009–2010	41	0		
Rodrigo Possebon	Italy	Midfielder	2010–2011	34	1		
Rodrigo Souto	Brazil	Midfielder	2007–2009	171	11		
Rodrigo Tabata	Qatar	Midfielder	2006–2008	154	24		
Rodrigo Tiuí	Brazil	Forward	2006–2007	54	12		
Rodrigues	Brazil	Forward	1977	9	0		
Rodriguinho	Brazil	Forward	1955	1	0		
Rodriguinho	Brazil	Midfielder	2010–2011	27	2		
Rodrygo	Brazil	Forward	2017–2019	82	17		
Roger	Brazil	Goalkeeper	2006–2007	9	0		
Roger Gaúcho	Brazil	Midfielder	2011	7	0		
Rogério	Brazil	Forward	1971	18	5		
Rogério	Brazil	Defender	2005	26	1		
Rogério Seves	Brazil	Defender	1996–1997	34	0		
Rogério Trivelatto	Brazil	Defender	1991–1993;1995	73	0		
Romário	Brazil	Defender	2018	2	0		
Rómulo Otero	Venezuela	Midfielder	2024	51	8		
Romero		Midfielder	1959	1	0		
Ronaldão	Brazil	Defender	1996–1998	88	6		
Ronaldo	Brazil	Defender	1952–1953	2	0		
Ronaldo	Brazil	Forward	1975	6	0		
Ronaldo	Brazil	Forward	1981–1982	45	3		
Ronaldo	Brazil	Defender	1994–1995	24	0		
Ronaldo Guiaro	Brazil	Defender	2006	38	0		
Ronaldo Marconato	Brazil	Defender	1995–1998	69	6		
Ronaldo Marques	Brazil	Forward	1984	45	13		
Ronaldo Mendes	Brazil	Midfielder	2016–2017	13	3		
Roni	Brazil	Forward	2009	29	5		
Roque	Argentina	Midfielder	1944	1	0		
Rosa	Brazil	Midfielder	1921–1925	58	0		
Rosan	Brazil	Goalkeeper	1962	1	0		
Rosas	Brazil	Midfielder	1921–1925	38	0		
Rossi	Brazil	Forward	1963–1966	57	7		
Rossini	Brazil	Midfielder	2005	11	0		
Ruben Aveiros	Paraguay	Forward	1945	16	2		
Rubens	Brazil	Forward	1943–1948	57	17		
Rubens	Brazil	Midfielder	1958	2	0		
Rubens Cardoso	Brazil	Defender	2000–2003	65	2		
Rubens Feijão	Brazil	Forward	1977–1981	134	35		
Rubinho	Brazil		1957	1	0		
Rudney	Brazil		1988	2	0		
Ruenda			1936	2	0		
Russo	Brazil		1956	1	0		
Russo	Brazil	Defender	2001	50	4		
Ruy	Brazil	Forward	1937–1947	222	97		
Rwan Seco	Brazil	Forward	2022–2023	37	5		
Rychely	Brazil	Forward	2011	7	2		
Sabino	Brazil	Defender	2021	1	1		
Sacy	Brazil	Forward	1935–1940	140	38		
Salles	Brazil	Midfielder	1929	1	1		
Salomão	Brazil	Midfielder	1965–1966	37	5		
Samarone	Brazil	Goalkeeper	1954	1	0		
Sandro	Brazil		1932	1	0		
Sandro	Brazil	Forward	1935	10	4		
Sandro	Brazil	Defender	1996–1999	119	7		
Sandro Perpétuo	Brazil	Defender	2021	2	0		
Sandry	Brazil	Midfielder	2019–2024	106	0		
Sangaletti	Brazil	Defender	2000	13	0		
Santana	Brazil	Midfielder	1963–1965	8	2		
Santos	Brazil	Midfielder	1952	3	0		
Sapia			1925	3	0		
Sarno	Brazil	Defender	1951–1952;1955–1956	43	0		
Saulo	Brazil	Goalkeeper	2005	26	0		
Saverio Lepore	Italy	Defender	1950	6	0		
Sebastián Pinto	Chile	Forward	2008	7	1		
Serginho	Brazil	Forward	1987;1989	3	0		
Serginho	Brazil	Midfielder	2010;2024	20	2		
Serginho	China	Midfielder	2014–2017	50	1		
Serginho Carioca	Brazil	Midfielder	1985–1986	54	3		
Serginho Cederboon	Brazil	Forward	1980–1981	17	2		
Serginho Chulapa	Brazil	Forward	1983–1984;1986;1988–1990	201	105		
Serginho Dourado	Brazil	Forward	1981–1984;1986–1987	122	18		
Serginho Fraldinha	Brazil	Forward	1991–1994	84	8		
Sérgio Guedes	Brazil	Goalkeeper	1989–1992;1996	241	0		
Sergio Santín	Uruguay	Midfielder	1986	16	0		
Sérgio Manoel	Brazil	Midfielder	1989–1993	127	7		
Sérgio Santos	Brazil	Midfielder	1990–1991;1993–1994	69	1		
Sérgio Soares	Brazil	Midfielder	1994	1	0		
Serrão	Brazil	Midfielder	1932	1	0		
Sidnei	Brazil	Midfielder	1950	1	0		
Sidney	Brazil	Midfielder	1988	17	0		
Silas	Brazil	Goalkeeper	1961–1963;1965	34	0		
Silas Carrere	Brazil	Goalkeeper	1983–1985	17	0		
Silva	Brazil	Forward	1921;1923	4	2		
Silva	Brazil	Defender	1951	1	0		
Silva	Brazil	Midfielder	1977	10	0		
Silva	Brazil	Defender	1993–1995	131	2		
Silva Batuta	Brazil	Forward	1967	19	11		
Silveira	Brazil	Forward	1934	3	0		
Sílvio	Brazil	Goalkeeper	1987	3	0		
Sílvio	Brazil	Defender	2003	2	0		
Simões	Brazil	Midfielder	1930	1	0		
Simões	Brazil	Forward	1949	14	5		
Simon	Brazil	Forward	1912–1913;1915	4	0		
Sinésio	Brazil	Midfielder	1929	3	0		
Siriri	Brazil	Forward	1923–1929	113	82		
Soares	Brazil	Forward	1988	17	2		
Sócrates	Brazil	Midfielder	1988–1989	46	14		
Solano	Brazil	Forward	1986	25	2		
Soletto	Brazil	Defender	1933	6	2		
Sormani	Italy	Forward	1959–1961	94	23		
Souza	Brazil	Midfielder	2014	19	0		
**Souza**	Brazil	Defender	2024–present	38	1		
Stefano Yuri	Brazil	Forward	2014	19	2		
Stiven Mendoza	Colombia	Forward	2023	46	10		
Suemar	Brazil	Defender	1981–1982	54	1		
Suplicy	Brazil	Forward	1915	2	0		
Sydney	Brazil	Defender	1912–1913;1917	5	0		
Sylvio Hoffman	Brazil	Defender	1931–1932	33	0		
Tabuan	Brazil	Defender	1949	2	0		
Tailson	Brazil	Forward	2019–2021;2022	37	1		
Tarzan	Brazil	Goalkeeper	1943	1	0		
Tata	Brazil	Midfielder	1976	28	7		
Tato	Brazil	Forward	1991	31	2		
Taveira	Brazil	Forward	1936–1937	8	1		
Tavan	Brazil	Defender	1937	3	0		
Tcheco	Brazil	Midfielder	2005	19	0		
Tedesco	Brazil	Forward	1916	8	2		
Teleco	Brazil	Forward	1944	15	11		
Telesca	Brazil	Midfielder	1948–1950	59	2		
Teodoro	Brazil	Midfielder	1975	30	0		
Teófilo Juárez	Argentina	Defender	1940	1	0		
Terezo	Brazil	Defender	1977	8	1		
**Thaciano**	Brazil	Midfielder	2017;2025–present	32	5		
Theo	Brazil	Forward	1938	1	1		
Theobaldo	Brazil	Defender	1935	1	0		
Thiago	Brazil	Forward	2002	5	0		
Thiago Carleto	Brazil	Defender	2007–2008	22	0		
Thiago Maia	Brazil	Midfielder	2014–2016	125	4		
Thiago Ribeiro	Brazil	Forward	2013–2015;2017	102	23		
Thomé	Brazil	Defender	1986–1987;1989	5	0		
Tiago Alves	Brazil	Forward	2011–2012	16	1		
Tiago Luís	Brazil	Forward	2008–2010;2012	31	2		
Tião	Brazil	Forward	1976	3	0		
Tico	Brazil	Forward	1925	2	1		
Tico	Brazil	Midfielder	1933–1935	4	0		
Tico	Brazil	Midfielder	1945–1946	6	0		
Tilly	Brazil	Midfielder	1930	3	0		
**Tiquinho Soares**	Brazil	Forward	2025–present	40	7		
Tite	Brazil	Forward	1951–1957;1960–1963	476	151		
Tito	Brazil		1934	1	0		
Tobias	Brazil	Goalkeeper	1942	1	0		
Toinzinho	Brazil	Midfielder	1975–1978	126	27		
Tom Mix	Brazil	Forward	1938–1941	66	15		
**Tomás Rincón**	Venezuela	Midfielder	2023–present	75	2		
Tomo Sugawara	Japan	Midfielder	1999	4	0		
Tonho	Brazil	Forward	1951	1	0		
Toni	Brazil	Forward	1993	1	0		
Toninho	Brazil	Defender	1945–1947	34	1		
Toninho	Brazil		1954	1	0		
Toninho Carlos	Brazil	Defender	1982–1987	295	4		
Toninho Guerreiro	Brazil	Forward	1963–1968	368	279		
Toninho Marques	Brazil	Forward	1991	5	0		
Toninho Oliveira	Brazil	Defender	1982–1986	99	2		
Toninho Paraná	Brazil	Defender	1982–1983	34	0		
Toninho Silva	Brazil	Midfielder	1981–1983	14	0		
Toninho Vieira	Brazil	Midfielder	1976;1978–1983	158	6		
Tormin			1925	1	0		
Tostão	Brazil	Midfielder	1973;1975–1976	11	2		
Totonho	Brazil	Forward	1975–1977	76	26		
Totonho II	Brazil	Forward	1989	36	2		
Triguinho	Brazil	Defender	2009	36	2		
Tuca	Brazil	Defender	1974–1976	51	3		
Tuffy	Brazil	Goalkeeper	1920;1927	26	0		
Tuíco	Brazil	Forward	1988–1989	82	6		
Tupan	Brazil	Forward	1936–1937	14	12		
Turcão	Brazil	Defender	1964–1975	254	3		
Tuta	Brazil	Forward	1952	2	0		
Ulysses	Brazil	Midfielder	1938–1943	17	0		
Urbano Caldeira	Brazil	Goalkeeper	1913–1918	44	2		
Urubatão	Brazil	Midfielder	1954–1961	320	29		
Vadinho	Brazil	Midfielder	1965	2	1		
Vagner	Brazil	Forward	1985	2	0		
Vágner	Brazil	Midfielder	1995–1997	80	11		
Vagner	Brazil	Midfielder	2001	7	1		
Vaguinho	Brazil	Forward	1952	5	4		
Val Baiano	Brazil	Forward	2003	10	0		
Válber	Brazil	Defender	2001	8	1		
Valdemir	Brazil	Defender	1978–1979	22	0		
Valdemiro	Brazil	Midfielder	1933	2	0		
Valdir	Brazil	Forward	1956–1957	6	0		
Valdir	Brazil	Defender	1996;1999;2001	32	1		
Valdir Bigode	Brazil	Forward	2000	24	5		
Valdo	Brazil	Midfielder	2000	45	4		
Valtinho	Brazil	Forward	1966	1	0		
Vanderlei	Brazil	Goalkeeper	2015–2019	258	0		
Vani	Brazil	Midfielder	1926–1930	3	1		
Vareta	Brazil	Forward	1942–1943	11	9		
Vasco	Brazil	Forward	1959	1	0		
Vasconcelos	Brazil	Forward	1953–1958	175	115		
Vavá	Brazil	Midfielder	1941	2	0		
Veiga	Brazil	Midfielder	1931	1	0		
Veiguinha	Brazil	Forward	1974	3	0		
Velloso	Brazil	Goalkeeper	1993	3	0		
Veludo	Brazil	Goalkeeper	1957–1958	24	0		
Vergara	Brazil	Forward	1937	3	0		
Verissimo	Brazil	Goalkeeper	1951	5	0		
Vicente Rojas	Argentina	Forward	1939	2	1		
Viana	Brazil	Defender	1939–1940	34	0		
Vicente	Brazil	Defender	1971–1976	224	0		
Victor Andrade	Brazil	Forward	2012–2014	31	3		
Víctor Aristizábal	Colombia	Forward	1998–1999	23	6		
Victor Ferraz	Brazil	Defender	2014–2019	265	10		
Victor Gonçalves	Brazil	Forward	1930–1936	140	54		
**Victor Hugo**	Brazil	Midfielder	2025–present	9	0		
Victor Yan	Brazil	Midfielder	2018	1	0		
Vidal	Brazil	Midfielder	1923	1	0		
Vilson	Brazil		1990	1	0		
Vilson	Brazil	Defender	1993	12	1		
Vinícius	Brazil	Midfielder	2007	4	0		
Vinicius Balieiro	Brazil	Midfielder	2020–2023	71	3		
**Vinicius Lira**	Brazil	Defender	2025–present	3	0		
Vinícius Simon	Brazil	Defender	2008;2010–2012;2014	26	1		
Vinicius Zanocelo	Brazil	Midfielder	2021–2023	78	5		
Viola	Brazil	Forward	1998–1999;2001	92	64		
Vitor	Brazil	Goalkeeper	1978–1980	66	0		
Vitor Bueno	Brazil	Midfielder	2015–2018	104	23		
Vitor Júnior	Brazil	Midfielder	2007–2008	32	1		
Vitor Lovecchio	Brazil	Goalkeeper	1930–1939;1941	59	0		
Viveiros	Brazil	Forward	1937	3	2		
Vladimir	Brazil	Goalkeeper	2011;2013–2021;2023	75	0		
Wagner Diniz	Brazil	Defender	2009	6	0		
Wagner Leonardo	Brazil	Defender	2019–2021	40	1		
Walace	Brazil	Defender	2011	1	0		
Waldemar	Brazil	Forward	1931–1933	5	0		
Waldemar Ratto	Brazil	Defender	1919;1922–1923	14	0		
Waldomiro	Brazil	Forward	1919;1923	12	5		
Waldyr	Brazil	Forward	1938	1	0		
Wallace	Brazil	Midfielder	1958	1	0		
Walter	Brazil	Goalkeeper	1937	3	0		
Walter Jorge	Brazil	Goalkeeper	1955	5	0		
Walter Marciano	Brazil	Midfielder	1953–1955	114	46		
Walter Montillo	Argentina	Midfielder	2013–2014	52	8		
Walterson	Brazil	Forward	2016	3	0		
Wanderlino	Brazil	Defender	1938–1939	69	0		
Wanderson	Brazil		1991	1	0		
Washington	Brazil	Defender	1979–1981	141	4		
Wason Rentería	Colombia	Forward	2011–2012	22	2		
Weldon	Brazil	Forward	2000–2001	18	2		
Wellington	Brazil	Forward	1979–1981	11	0		
Wellington	Brazil		1991–1992	2	0		
Wellington	Brazil	Midfielder	2002–2003	47	0		
Wellington Paulista	Brazil	Forward	2006	36	10		
Wellington Tim	Brazil	Defender	2021	4	0		
Wendel	Brazil	Forward	2005–2006	70	5		
Wendel	Brazil	Defender	2008	17	0		
Wendel Silva	Brazil	Forward	2024–2025	19	4		
Werley	Brazil	Defender	2015	44	3		
Werneck	Brazil	Midfielder	1968–1969	17	4		
Wesley	Brazil	Midfielder	2007–2010	89	10		
Wesley Santos	Brazil	Defender	2010–2011	3	0		
Weslley Patati	Brazil	Forward	2022–2024	33	2		
Whelliton	Brazil	Forward	1995–1996	17	3		
William	Brazil	Forward	2001–2005	93	28		
William Paul	Scotland	Forward	1913–1914	9	7		
Willian	Brazil	Forward	2024	38	7		
**Willian Arão**	Brazil	Midfielder	2025–present	13	0		
Willian José	Brazil	Forward	2013	26	5		
Willian Maranhão	Brazil	Midfielder	2022	9	0		
Willians	Brazil	Goalkeeper	1973–1978	89	0		
Wilson	Brazil	Midfielder	1951	1	0		
Wilson Campos	Brazil	Defender	1968;1974;1975	60	0		
Wilson Capão	Brazil	Defender	1955–1957	41	0		
Wilson Quiqueto	Brazil	Goalkeeper	1973–1977	94	0		
Wilson Tergal	Brazil	Forward	1966–1968	55	7		
Wladimir	Brazil	Defender	1989	58	1		
Xatara	Brazil	Defender	1952	2	0		
Xisto	Brazil	Midfielder	1953	1	0		
Xuxa	Brazil	Midfielder	2005	1	0		
Yeferson Soteldo	Venezuela	Forward	2019–2021;2023;2025	161	21		
Yuri	Brazil	Midfielder	2016–2019	70	1		
Yuri Alberto	Brazil	Forward	2017–2020	27	3		
Zague	Brazil	Forward	1961	4	1		
Zé Antonio	Brazil	Forward	1974	4	0		
Zé Carlos	Brazil	Midfielder	1978–1982	70	1		
Zé Carlos Cabeleira	Brazil	Defender	1972–1976	235	11		
Zé Carlos Silvério	Brazil	Defender	1960–1963;1966–1967	122	0		
Zé Carlos Taveira	Brazil	Forward	1935–1939	47	41		
Zé Eduardo	Brazil	Forward	2010–2011	81	26		
Zé Elias	Brazil	Midfielder	2004–2005	42	1		
Zé Humberto	Brazil	Forward	1990	41	3		
**Zé Ivaldo**	Brazil	Defender	2025–present	35	1		
Zé Leandro	Brazil	Defender	2005	7	0		
Zé Maria	Brazil	Forward	1959	1	1		
Zé Mário	Brazil	Midfielder	1976–1977	58	1		
**Zé Rafael**	Brazil	Midfielder	2025–present	28	1		
Zé Renato	Brazil	Midfielder	1990–1994	113	13		
Zé Roberto	Brazil	Forward	1978–1979	23	3		
Zé Roberto	Brazil	Midfielder	2006–2007	48	12		
Zé Sérgio	Brazil	Forward	1984–1986	135	15		
Zeca	Brazil	Forward	1953	1	0		
Zeca	Brazil		1975	1	0		
Zeca	Brazil	Defender	2014–2017	140	4		
Zeca Ferreira	Brazil	Forward	1945–1946	9	11		
Zeca Ratto	Brazil	Defender	1922	3	0		
Zeferino	Brazil	Midfielder	1945–1950	60	15		
Zetti	Brazil	Goalkeeper	1997–1999	188	0		
Zezé	Brazil	Defender	1954	1	0		
Zezé	Brazil	Goalkeeper	1945–1946	23	0		
Zezinho	Brazil	Defender	1956–1960	17	1		
Zezinho	Brazil	Forward	1960	1	0		
Zezinho	Brazil	Forward	1975	1	0		
Zezinho	Brazil	Midfielder	2010	19	0		
Zilmar	Brazil	Forward	1952	1	0		
Zimmerman	Brazil	Forward	1988	12	1		
Zinho	Brazil	Midfielder	1932	1	0		
Zinho	Brazil	Forward	1955–1957	14	4		
Zito	Brazil	Midfielder	1952–1967	733	57		
Zizinho	Brazil	Midfielder	1988	15	0		
Zoca	Brazil	Forward	1941–1942	38	11		
Zoca	Brazil	Forward	1961–1962	15	4		

== Notes ==
NB For a full description of positions see football positions.

== See also ==
- Santos FC and the Brazil national football team

== Filmography ==
- Aníbal Massaini Neto, Pelé Eterno, 2004.
- Carlos Hugo Christensen, O Rei Pelé, 1963.
- Djalma Limongi Batista, Asa Branca: um sonho brasileiro, 1981.
- Eduardo Escorel and Luiz Carlos Barreto, Isto é Pelé, 1974.
- Felipe Nepomuceno, Guadalajara 70, 2002.
- Hank Levine, Marcelo Machado and Tocha Alves, Ginga, 2004.
- Mercado Livre, Santos, Especial, 2011.
- Paulo Machline, Uma história de futebol, 1998.
- Pedro Asbeg, Dogão calabresa, 2002.
- Ugo Giorgetti, Boleiros, 1998.
