= 2010 Santos FC season =

Santos
2010 season
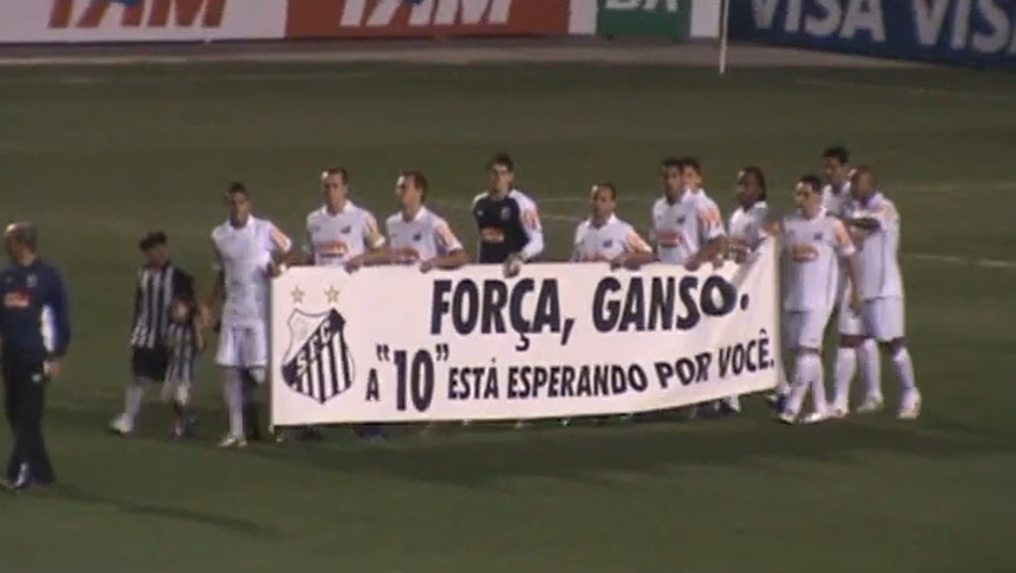
- Santos players entering the field at the Pacaembu before a match against Goiás on 28 August
- President: Luis Álvaro de Oliveira Ribeiro
- Coach: Dorival Júnior (until 21 September); Marcelo Martelotte (caretaker)
- Campeonato Brasileiro: 8th
- Campeonato Paulista: Winners
- Copa do Brasil: Winners
- Copa Sudamericana: Second round
- Top goalscorer: League: Neymar (17); All: Neymar (42)
- Highest home attendance: 36,260 v Santo André (2 May)
- Lowest home attendance: 2,060 v Sertãozinho (7 April)
Home colours	Away colours

The 2010 season was Santos Futebol Clube's ninety-eighth season in existence and the club's fifty-first consecutive season in the top flight of Brazilian football.

On 4 December 2009, Luis Álvaro de Oliveira Ribeiro was elect President for the next two years.

This season marked the new Meninos da Vila generation, where Neymar, Ganso, Rafael, Wesley, André, alongside Robinho (who joined the club on a six-month loan deal) and others players, helped Santos win their 18th Campeonato Paulista title, beating Santo André in the finals. Santos also won the Copa do Brasil title, winning for the first time in history. It was the culmination of a campaign marked by a devastating team with relentless wins, as against Naviraiense 10–0 and 8–1 against Guarani, game in which Neymar scored five goals. In the second half of the year, losses of key players as Wesley (sold to Werder Bremen), André (sold to Dynamo Kyiv), Robinho (who returned to Manchester City), Ganso (who suffered an Anterior cruciate ligament injury), and the dismissal of coach Dorival Junior after a misunderstanding involving Neymar, Santos was unable to go beyond an 8th place in the Campeonato Brasileiro and postponed the conquest of the "triple crown" (symbolic title given to whoever wins in the same year, the State Championship, the Brazil Cup and Brazil League).

== Players ==
=== Squad information ===
Note: Flags indicate national team as defined under FIFA eligibility rules; some limited exceptions apply. Players may hold more than one non-FIFA nationality.

No.	Pos.	Nation	Player
—	GK	BRA	Rafael
—	GK	BRA	Felipe
—	GK	BRA	Vladimir
—	DF	BRA	Alex Sandro
—	DF	BRA	Bruno Aguiar
—	DF	BRA	Bruno Rodrigo
—	DF	BRA	Danilo
—	DF	BRA	Durval
—	DF	BRA	Edu Dracena
—	DF	BRA	Léo
—	DF	BRA	Pará
—	DF	BRA	Rafael Caldeira
—	DF	BRA	Vinicius Simon
—	MF	BRA	Adriano
—	MF	BRA	Alan Patrick
—	MF	BRA	Arouca
—	MF	VEN	Breitner

No.	Pos.	Nation	Player
—	MF	BRA	Felipe Anderson
—	MF	BRA	Ganso
—	MF	BRA	Madson
—	MF	BRA	Marquinhos
—	MF	BRA	Moisés
—	MF	BRA	Roberto Brum
—	MF	BRA	Rodrigo Possebon
—	MF	BRA	Rodriguinho
—	MF	BRA	Victor Hugo
—	MF	BRA	Zézinho
—	FW	BRA	Dimba
—	FW	BRA	Keirrison
—	FW	BRA	Marcel
—	FW	BRA	Neymar
—	FW	BRA	Tiago Luís
—	FW	BRA	Zé Eduardo

=== Appearances and goals ===
Pos.	Name	Campeonato Brasileiro		Campeonato Paulista		Copa do Brasil		Copa Sudamericana		Total	
Pos.	Name	Apps	Goals	Apps	Goals	Apps	Goals	Apps	Goals	Apps	Goals
GK	(Brazil) Felipe	6	0	23	0	9	0	1	0	39	0
GK	(Brazil) Rafael	32	0	0	0	2	0	2	0	36	0
DF	(Brazil) Alex Sandro	24	1	1	1	5	1	0	0	30	3
DF	(Brazil) Léo	18	0	12	0	5	0	2	0	37	0
DF	(Brazil) Maranhão	18	2	2	0	4	0	0	0	24	2
DF	(Brazil) Pará	31	0	20	1	9	0	2	0	62	1
DF	(Brazil) Bruno Aguiar	10	0	6	0	3	0	0	0	19	0
DF	(Brazil) Bruno Rodrigo	1	0	5	0	0	0	0	0	6	0
DF	(Brazil) Durval	34	2	20	1	10	0	2	0	66	3
DF	(Brazil) Edu Dracena	28	2	16	0	9	2	2	0	55	4
DF	(Brazil) Rafael Caldeira	2	0	0	0	0	0	0	0	2	0
DF	(Brazil) Wesley Santos [YS]^{[a]}	0	0	1	0	0	0	0	0	1	0
MF	(Brazil) Adriano	5	0	0	0	0	0	0	0	5	0
MF	(Brazil) Alan Patrick	18	4	1	0	0	0	0	0	19	4
MF	(Brazil) Arouca	28	0	15	0	9	0	2	0	54	0
MF	(Venezuela) Breitner	11	0	2	0	1	1	0	0	14	1
MF	(Brazil) Roberto Brum	16	0	12	0	1	0	0	0	29	0
MF	(Brazil) Danilo	26	4	0	0	0	0	0	0	26	4
MF	(Brazil) Felipe Anderson	5	0	0	0	0	0	0	0	5	0
MF	(Brazil) Ganso	11	0	20	11	10	2	2	0	43	13
MF	(Brazil) Jefferson Souza [YS]^{[a]}	1	0	0	0	0	0	0	0	1	0
MF	(Brazil) Madson	18	2	18	4	6	2	2	0	44	8
MF	(Brazil) Marquinhos	28	0	18	4	8	3	2	0	56	7
MF	(Brazil) Moisés	1	0	0	0	0	0	0	0	1	0
MF	(Brazil) Rodrigo Possebon	3	0	0	0	0	0	0	0	3	0
MF	(Brazil) Rodriguinho	14	2	4	0	6	0	1	0	25	2
MF	(Brazil) Serginho [YS]^{[a]}	0	0	1	0	0	0	0	0	1	0
MF	(Brazil) Zezinho	14	0	1	0	1	0	0	0	16	0
FW	(Brazil) Dimba	1	0	0	0	0	0	0	0	1	0
FW	(Brazil) Keirrison	11	3	0	0	0	0	0	0	11	3
FW	(Brazil) Marcel	24	7	1	1	5	1	1	0	31	9
FW	(Brazil) Neymar	31	17	19	17	8	11	2	0	60	42
FW	(Brazil) Tiago Luís	2	0	0	0	0	0	0	0	2	0
FW	(Brazil) Zé Eduardo	28	10	15	6	5	0	2	2	50	18
Players transferred during the season
DF	(Brazil) George Lucas	0	0	4	0	2	0	0	0	6	0
DF	(Brazil) Luciano Castan	0	0	1	0	0	0	0	0	1	0
DF	(Brazil) Vinicius Simon	5	0	0	0	0	0	0	0	5	0
MF	(Brazil) Germano	0	0	7	1	1	0	0	0	8	1
MF	(Brazil) Giovanni	1	0	4	1	2	0	0	0	7	1
MF	(Brazil) Rodrigo Mancha	1	0	16	0	4	0	0	0	21	0
MF	(Brazil) Wesley	11	1	20	6	9	2	1	0	41	9
FW	(Brazil) André	9	5	21	13	11	8	0	0	41	26
FW	(Brazil) Maikon Leite	1	0	5	1	1	0	0	0	7	1
FW	(Brazil) Robinho	2	0	12	5	9	6	0	0	23	11

a Player from Youth System with first team experience.

Last updated: 5 December 2010
Source: Match reports in competitive matches

=== Top scorers ===
R	Name	Brasileirão	Paulistão	Copa do Brasil	Sudamericana	Total
1	(Brazil) Neymar	17	14	11	0	42
2	(Brazil) André	5	13	8	0	26
3	(Brazil) Zé Eduardo	10	6	0	2	18
4	(Brazil) Ganso	0	11	2	0	13
5	(Brazil) Robinho	0	5	6	0	11
6	(Brazil) Wesley	2	6	2	0	10
7	(Brazil) Madson	2	4	2	0	8

Last updated: 5 December 2010
Source: Match reports in Competitive matches

=== Disciplinary record ===
N	P	Nat.	Name	Campeonato Paulista			Campeonato Brasileiro			Copa do Brasil			Copa Sudamericana			Total			Notes
N	P	Nat.	Name	Yellow card	Second yellow card	Red card	Yellow card	Second yellow card	Red card	Yellow card	Second yellow card	Red card	Yellow card	Second yellow card	Red card	Yellow card	Second yellow card	Red card	Notes
	MF	(Brazil)	Adriano				3									3			
	DF	(Brazil)	Alex Sandro				9	2								9	2		
	FW	(Brazil)	André	1			1			1						3			
	MF	(Brazil)	Arouca				9			3						12			
	DF	(Brazil)	Bruno Aguiar				2			1						3			
	DF	(Brazil)	Bruno Rodrigo	3												3			
	MF	(Venezuela)	Breitner	1												1			
	DF	(Brazil)	Danilo				6									6			
	DF	(Brazil)	Durval	2			9			5						16			
	DF	(Brazil)	Edu Dracena	5			11	1		2		1	1			19	1	1	
	GK	(Brazil)	Felipe	1			1									2			
	MF	(Brazil)	Felipe Anderson				1									1			
	MF	(Brazil)	Ganso	8			4									12			
	DF	(Brazil)	George Lucas							1						1			
	FW	(Brazil)	Keirrison				3									3			
	DF	(Brazil)	Léo	4	1	1	6			3						13	1	1	
	DF	(Brazil)	Luciano Castan	2	1											2	1		
	MF	(Brazil)	Madson	1			1									2			
	FW	(Brazil)	Maikon Leite	1												1			
	DF	(Brazil)	Maranhão				2			1						3			
	FW	(Brazil)	Marcel				2		1	2						4		1	
	MF	(Brazil)	Marquinhos	1		1				2						3		1	
	FW	(Brazil)	Neymar	7		1	11			4			1			23		1	
	DF	(Brazil)	Pará	7			7			3						17			
	GK	(Brazil)	Rafael				2			1						3			
	DF	(Brazil)	Rafael Caldeira				1									1			
	MF	(Brazil)	Roberto Brum	3		1	3									6		1	
	FW	(Brazil)	Robinho	2						2						4			
	MF	(Brazil)	Rodrigo Mancha	4						1						5			
	MF	(Brazil)	Rodrigo Possebon				1									1			
	MF	(Brazil)	Rodriguinho	2			8			2			1			13			
	FW	(Brazil)	Tiago Luís				1									1			
	DF	(Brazil)	Vinicius Simon				1									1			
	MF	(Brazil)	Wesley	8	1		1									9	1		
	FW	(Brazil)	Zé Eduardo	2			5	1		1						8	1		
	MF	(Brazil)	Zezinho				2									2			

Last updated: 5 December 2010
Source: Campeonato Paulista, Campeonato Brasileiro, Copa do Brasil, Copa Sudamericana
Ordered by (red card) , (second yellow card) and (yellow card)
(yellow card) = Number of bookings; (second yellow card) = Number of sending offs after a second yellow card; (red card) = Number of sending offs by a direct red card.

== Club ==
=== Coaching staff ===
Position	Staff
Coach	Dorival Júnior
Assistant coach	Ivan Izzo; Edinho; Marcelo Martelotte
Fitness trainer	Ricardo Rosa; Celso Rezende; Marco Alejandro
Goalkeeping coach	Antônio Barbirotto Junior

=== Kit ===
Supplier: Umbro
Sponsor(s): Seara

Home	Away

== Transfers ==
=== In ===
Pos.	Name	Moving from	Type	Ends	Source
DF	(Brazil) Bruno Rodrigo	Portuguesa	Signed	2012	
DF	(Brazil) Bruno Aguiar	Guarani	Signed	2012	
MF	(Brazil) Marquinhos	Avaí	Signed	2012	
GK	(Brazil) Vladimir	Fortaleza	Loan return	2014	
GK	(Brazil) Felipe	Paraná Clube	Loan return	2012	
MF	(Brazil) Roberto Brum	Figueirense	Loan return	2011	
DF	(Brazil) Durval	Sport	Signed	2011	
MF	(Brazil) Wesley	Atlético–PR	Loan Return	2012	
MF	(Brazil) Giovanni	Mogi Mirim	Signed	2010	
FW	(Brazil) Zé Eduardo	Pinheiros	Loaned	2010	
DF	(Brazil) Luciano Castan	União São João	Loaned	2010	
DF	(Brazil) Maranhão	Guarani	Signed	2013	
MF	(Brazil) Arouca	São Paulo	Loaned	2010	
FW	(Brazil) Robinho	Manchester City (England)	Loaned	2010	
MF	(Brazil) Zezinho	Juventude	Loaned	2011	
DF	(Brazil) Alex Sandro	Atlético–PR	Loaned	2011	
MF	(Brazil) Rodriguinho	Guarani	Signed	2012	
FW	(Brazil) Marcel	Benfica (Portugal)	Loaned	2010	
FW	(Brazil) Tiago Lúis	União Leiria (Portugal)	Loan return	2013	
DF	(Brazil) Adriano	São Caetano	Loan return	2013	
DF	(Brazil) Danilo	América Mineiro	Signed	2013	
FW	(Brazil) Keirrison	Barcelona (Spain)	Loaned	2011	
MF	(Brazil) Rodrigo Possebon	Manchester United (England)	Signed	2014	
FW	(Brazil) Moisés	Paysandu	Signed	2010	
MF	(Brazil) Victor Hugo	Santa Cruz	Loaned	2011	
DF	(Brazil) Vinicius Simon	Criciúma	Loan return	2013	

=== Out ===
Pos.	Name	Moving to	Type	Source
DF	(Brazil) Wagner Diniz	São Paulo	Loan expiration	
DF	(Brazil) André Astorga	Bragantino	End of contract	
DF	(Brazil) Luizinho	Cruzeiro	Loan expiration	
GK	(Brazil) Sérgio	Free Agent	End of contract	
MF	(Brazil) Felipe Azevedo	Paulista	Loan expiration	
DF	(Brazil) Eli Sabiá	Paulista	Loan expiration	
DF	(Brazil) Adaílton	Free Agent	End of contract	
FW	(Brazil) Jean	Free Agent	End of contract	
DF	(Brazil) Paulo Henrique Rodrigues	Atlético–GO	Loan expiration	
DF	(Brazil) Triguinho	São Caetano	Loan expiration	
DF	(Brazil) Fabão	Free Agent	End of contract	
FW	(Brazil) Kléber Pereira	Free Agent	End of contract	
FW	(Brazil) Gil	Vila Nova	Contract termination	
MF	(Brazil) Rodrigo Souto	São Paulo	Swapped^{[b]}	
FW	(Brazil) Fabiano	Ipatinga	End of contract	
MF	(Brazil) Dionísio	Oeste	End of contract	
DF	(Brazil) Filipi Souza	SEV Hortolândia	End of contract	
MF	(Brazil) Patrik	São Bento	End of contract	
DF	(Brazil) Luciano Castan	União São João	Loan expiration	
MF	(Brazil) Germano	Sport	Contract termination	
DF	(Brazil) George Lucas	S.C. Braga (Portugal)	End of contract	
MF	(Brazil) Giovanni	Retirement	Retirement	
FW	(Brazil) André	Dynamo Kyiv (Ukraine)	Transferred	
FW	(Brazil) Robinho	Manchester City (England)	Loan expiration	
MF	(Brazil) Wesley	Werder Bremen (Germany)	Transferred	

b Included in Arouca loan.

=== Out on loan ===
Pos.	Name	Moving to	Until	Source
FW	(Brazil) Fabiano	Atlético Sorocaba	2 May 2010	
MF	(Brazil) Róbson	Avaí	31 December 2010	
DF	(Brazil) Vinicius Simon	Criciúma	31 December 2010	
GK	(Brazil) Douglas	Ipatinga	31 December 2010	
FW	(Brazil) Maikon Leite	Atlético–PR	31 December 2010	
MF	(Brazil) Rodrigo Mancha	Grêmio Barueri	15 May 2011	
GK	(Brazil) Fábio Costa	Atlético Mineiro	31 December 2011	

== Friendlies ==
20 March	New York Red Bulls (United States)	3–1	(Brazil) Santos	Harrison, New Jersey
19:05 UTC-03:00	Lindpere 11'; Petke 43'; Richards 45'		90' Germano	Stadium: Red Bull Arena; Attendance: 25,189

4 July	Ferroviária	0–3	Santos	Araraquara
16:00 UTC-03:00			36' (pen.) Neymar; 38' Alan Patrick; 87' Breitner	Stadium: Estádio Dr. Adhemar de Barros; Referee: José Henrique de Carvalho

9 July	XV de Piracicaba	0–0	Santos	Piracicaba
20:30 UTC-03:00				Stadium: Estádio Barão da Serra Negra

== Competitions ==
=== Overview ===
Competition	First match	Last match	Starting round	Final position	Record							
Competition	First match	Last match	Starting round	Final position	Pld	W	D	L	GF	GA	GD	Win %
Série A	8 May 2010	5 December 2010	Matchday 1	8th	38	15	11	12	63	50	+13	39.47
Copa do Brasil	24 February 2010	4 August 2010	First round	Winners	11	7	0	4	39	15	+24	63.64
Campeonato Paulista	17 January 2010	2 May 2010	Matchday 1	Winners	23	18	2	3	72	31	+41	78.26
Copa Sudamericana	12 August 2010	18 August 2010	Second round	Second round	2	1	0	1	2	3	−1	50.00
Total					74	41	13	20	176	99	+77	55.41

Source: Competitions

=== Campeonato Brasileiro ===
==== League table ====
Pos	Team	Pld	W	D	L	GF	GA	GD	Pts	Qualification or relegation
6	Botafogo	38	14	17	7	54	42	+12	59	2011 Copa Sudamericana Second Stage
7	Internacional	38	16	10	12	48	41	+7	58	2011 Copa Libertadores Second Stage (Note: Internacional qualified as the 2010 Copa Libertadores champion.)
8	Santos	38	15	11	12	63	50	+13	56	2011 Copa Libertadores Second Stage (Note: Santos qualified as the 2010 Copa do Brasil champion.)
9	São Paulo	38	15	10	13	54	54	0	55	2011 Copa Sudamericana Second Stage
10	Palmeiras	38	12	14	12	42	43	−1	50	2011 Copa Sudamericana Second Stage

Rules for classification: 1st points; 2nd wins; 3rd goal difference; 4th goals scored; 5th head-to-head results; 6th least red cards received; 7th least yellow cards received; 8th draw

==== Results summary ====
Overall								Home						Away					
Pld	W	D	L	GF	GA	GD	Pts	W	D	L	GF	GA	GD	W	D	L	GF	GA	GD
38	15	11	12	63	50	+13	56	10	5	4	32	14	+18	5	6	8	31	36	−5

Last updated: 5 December 2010.
Source: Competitive matches

==== Results by round ====
Round	1	2	3	4	5	6	7	8	9	10	11	12	13	14	15	16	17	18	19	20	21	22	23	24	25	26	27	28	29	30	31	32	33	34	35	36	37	38
Ground	A	H	A	H	A	A	H	A	H	A	H	A	H	A	H	A	H	H	A	H	A	H	A	H	H	A	H	A	H	A	H	A	H	A	H	A	A	H
Result	D	D	W	W	L	D	W	L	L	L	W	W	W	L	W	W	W	W	D	L	L	W	D	L	W	L	D	W	W	L	L	D	D	D	D	W	L	D
Position	8	12	8	2	8	5	4	4	9	11	8	7	3	4	3	3	3	3	3	3	5	4	4	5	4	4	5	4	4	4	4	5	5	7	7	7	7	8

Updated to match(es) played on 5 December 2010. Source: Futpédia
A = Away; H = Home; W = Win; D = Draw; L = Loss

==== Matches ====
8 May 1	Botafogo	3–3	Santos	Rio de Janeiro
18:30 UTC-03:00	Antônio Carlos 8', 45'; Herrera 88'	Report	29' Neymar; 32' André; 79' Zé Eduardo	Stadium: Engenhão; Attendance: 25,634; Referee: Leonardo Gaciba Da Silva

16 May 2	Santos	1–1	Ceará	Santos
16:00 UTC-03:00	Neymar 38' (pen.)	Report	9' Washington	Stadium: Estádio Urbano Caldeira (Vila Belmiro); Attendance: 8,998; Referee: Ricardo Marques Ribeiro

22 May 3	Atlético–GO	1–2	Santos	Goiânia
18:30 UTC-03:00	Boka 87'	Report	65' Wesley; 71' Zé Eduardo	Stadium: Estádio do Governo do Estado de Goiás (Serra Dourada); Attendance: 4,669; Referee: Pericles Bassols Pegado Cortez

26 May 4	Santos	3–1	Guarani	Santos
21:50 UTC-03:00	Neymar 2'; Marcel 82'; André 88'	Report	37' Baiano	Stadium: Estádio Urbano Caldeira (Vila Belmiro); Attendance: 5,146; Referee: Wilson Luiz Seneme

30 May 5	Corinthians	4–2	Santos	São Paulo
16:00 UTC-03:00	Jorge Henrique 3'; Bruno César 54'; Ralf 66'; Paulinho 84'	Report	53' André; 87' Marcel	Stadium: Estádio Municipal Paulo Machado de Carvalho (Pacaembu); Attendance: 27,681; Referee: Salvio Spinola Fagundes Filho

2 June 6	Cruzeiro	0–0	Santos	Belo Horizonte
21:50 UTC-03:00		Report		Stadium: Estádio Governador Magalhães Pinto (Mineirão); Attendance: 15,708; Referee: Wilton Pereira Sampaio

6 June 7	Santos	4–0	Vasco	Santos
16:00 UTC-03:00	André 34' (pen.), 62'; Maranhão 51'; Madson 74'	Report		Stadium: Estádio Urbano Caldeira (Vila Belmiro); Attendance: 8,585; Referee: Jose de Caldas Souza

15 July 8	Palmeiras	2–1	Santos	São Paulo
21:00 UTC-03:00	Ewerthon 12'; Tinga 66'	Report	83' Marcel	Stadium: Estádio Municipal Paulo Machado de Carvalho (Pacaembu); Attendance: 9,400; Referee: Cléber Welington Abade

18 July 9	Santos	0–1	Fluminense	Santos
18:30 UTC-03:00		Report	77' Alan	Stadium: Estádio Urbano Caldeira (Vila Belmiro); Attendance: 9,193; Referee: Cléber Welington Abade

21 July 10	Atlético–PR	2–0	Santos	Curitiba
21:50 UTC-03:00	Bruno Costa 2'; Bruno Mineiro 46'	Report		Stadium: Estádio Joaquim Américo Guimarães (Arena da Baixada); Attendance: 20,001; Referee: Leonardo Gaciba da Silva

25 July 11	Santos	1–0	São Paulo	Santos
16:00 UTC-03:00	Renato Silva 60' (o.g.)	Report		Stadium: Estádio Urbano Caldeira (Vila Belmiro); Attendance: 9,367; Referee: Luiz Flavio De Oliveira

1 August 12	Grêmio Prudente	1–2	Santos	Presidente Prudente
18:30 UTC-03:00	Robson Santos 83'	Report	5' Danilo; 66' Rodriguinho	Stadium: Estádio Eduardo José Farah (Prudentão); Attendance: 15,890; Referee: Gutemberg de Paula Fonseca

13 October 13	Santos	1–0	Internacional	Santos
22:00 UTC-03:00	Neymar 26'	Report		Stadium: Estádio Urbano Caldeira (Vila Belmiro); Attendance: 10,036; Referee: Nielson Nogueira Dias

15 August 14	Vitória	4–2	Santos	Salvador
18:30 UTC-03:00	Henrique 20', 45'; Wallace 25'; Schwenck 72' (pen.)	Report	30' Marcel; 67' Zé Eduardo	Stadium: Estádio Manoel Barradas (Barradão); Attendance: 9,144; Referee: Sandro Meira Ricci

22 August 15	Santos	2–0	Atlético Mineiro	Santos
16:00 UTC-03:00	Neymar 55'; Danilo 78'	Report		Stadium: Estádio Urbano Caldeira (Vila Belmiro); Attendance: 10,220; Referee: Heber Roberto Lopes

25 August 16	Grêmio	1–2	Santos	Porto Alegre
22:00 UTC-03:00	Borges 6'	Report	68' (pen.) Neymar; 90+3' Rodriguinho	Stadium: Estádio Olímpico Monumental; Attendance: 12,379; Referee: Marcelo de Lima Henrique

28 August 17	Santos	2–0	Goiás	São Paulo
18:30 UTC-03:00	Zé Eduardo 75'; Alan Patrick 82'	Report		Stadium: Estádio Municipal Paulo Machado de Carvalho (Pacaembu); Attendance: 17,968; Referee: Alício Pena Júnior

2 September 18	Santos	2–1	Avaí	Santos
21:00 UTC-03:00	Neymar 46'; Marcel 83'	Report	88' Válber	Stadium: Estádio Urbano Caldeira (Vila Belmiro); Attendance: 7,141; Referee: Carlos Eugênio Símon

5 September 19	Flamengo	0–0	Santos	Rio de Janeiro
16:00 UTC-03:00		Report		Stadium: Estádio Jornalista Mário Filho (Maracanã); Attendance: 34,897; Referee: Leandro Vuaden

9 September 20	Santos	0–1	Botafogo	São Paulo
21:00 UTC-03:00		Report	90' Abreu	Stadium: Estádio Municipal Paulo Machado de Carvalho (Pacaembu); Attendance: 14,305; Referee: Ricardo Marques Ribeiro

12 September 21	Ceará	2–1	Santos	Fortaleza
18:30 UTC-03:00	Magno Alves 30'; Geraldo 69'	Report	31' Keirrison	Stadium: Estádio Governador Plácido Aderaldo Castelo (Castelão); Attendance: 23,374; Referee: Heber Roberto Lopes

15 September 22	Santos	4–2	Atlético–GO	Santos
19:30 UTC-03:00	Edu Dracena 51'; Madson 75'; Alan Patrick 80'; Marcel 84' (pen.)	Report	13' Josiel; 50' William	Stadium: Estádio Urbano Caldeira (Vila Belmiro); Attendance: 3,873; Referee: Leandro Pedro Vuaden

19 September 23	Guarani	0–0	Santos	Campinas
16:00 UTC-03:00		Report		Stadium: Estádio Brinco de Ouro da Princesa; Attendance: 10,998; Referee: Luiz Flávio de Oliveira

22 September 24	Santos	2–3	Corinthians	Santos
22:00 UTC-03:00	Durval 1'; Neymar 26'	Report	7' Iarley; 42' Elias; 69' Paulo André	Stadium: Estádio Urbano Caldeira (Vila Belmiro); Attendance: 10,898; Referee: Carlos Eugênio Simon

25 September 25	Santos	4–1	Cruzeiro	Barueri
18:30 UTC-03:00	Marcel 54'; Edu Dracena 69'; Alex Sandro 88'; Neymar 90'	Report	80' Thiago Ribeiro	Stadium: Arena Barueri; Attendance: 9,542; Referee: Péricles Bassols Pegado Cortez

28 September 26	Vasco	3–1	Santos	Rio de Janeiro
21:00 UTC-03:00	Fagner 30'; Felipe 35'; Éder Luís 90+4'	Report	55' Danilo	Stadium: Estádio Vasco da Gama (São Januário); Attendance: 2,819; Referee: Wilton Pereira Sampaio

2 October 27	Santos	1–1	Palmeiras	Santos
16:00 UTC-03:00	Alan Patrick 52'	Report	19' Kléber	Stadium: Estádio Urbano Caldeira (Vila Belmiro); Attendance: 8,900; Referee: Lúcio Flávio de Oliveira

6 October 28	Fluminense	0–3	Santos	Rio de Janeiro
19:30 UTC-03:00		Report	56', 74', 87' Zé Eduardo	Stadium: Estádio Olímpico João Havelange (Engenhão); Attendance: 14,385; Referee: Sandro Meira Ricci

9 October 29	Santos	2–0	Atlético–PR	Santos
18:30 UTC-03:00	Maranhão 62'; Zé Eduardo 65'	Report		Stadium: Estádio Urbano Caldeira (Vila Belmiro); Attendance: 8,417; Referee: Felipe Gomes da Silva

17 October 30	São Paulo	4–3	Santos	São Paulo
18:30 UTC-02:00	Dagoberto 7', 16'; Pará 19' (o.g.); Jean 90+2'	Report	4' Alan Patrick; 20' Zé Eduardo; 70' (pen.) Neymar	Stadium: Estádio Cícero Pompeu de Toledo (Morumbi); Attendance: 23,791; Referee: Sandro Meira Ricci

24 October 31	Santos	2–3	Grêmio Prudente	Santos
18:030 UTC-02:00	Keirrison 19'; Durval 36'	Report	46', 62' Wesley; 54' Gilmar	Stadium: Estádio Urbano Caldeira (Vila Belmiro); Attendance: Marcelo Aparecido de Souza; Referee: 11,075

30 October 32	Internacional	1–1	Santos	Porto Alegre
16:00 UTC-03:00	Leandro Damião 82'	Report	78' Zé Eduardo	Stadium: Estádio José Pinheiro Borda (Beira-Rio); Attendance: 29,565; Referee: Paulo Henrique Godoy Bezerra

3 November 33	Santos	1–1	Vitória	Santos
19:30 UTC-02:00	Neymar 33'	Report	40' Júnior	Stadium: Estádio Urbano Caldeira (Vila Belmiro); Attendance: 4,643; Referee: Edivaldo Elias da Silva

6 November 34	Atlético Mineiro	2–2	Santos	Sete Lagoas
19:30 UTC-02:00	Diego Tardelli 33'; Obina 60'	Report	16', 67' Neymar	Stadium: Arena do Jacaré; Attendance: 16,771; Referee: Wiltom Pereira Sampaio

13 November 35	Santos	0–0	Grêmio	Santos
19:30 UTC-02:00		Report		Stadium: Estádio Urbano Caldeira (Vila Belmiro); Attendance: 7,421; Referee: Ricardo Marques Ribeiro

21 November 36	Goiás	1–4	Santos	Goiânia
20:10 UTC-02:00	Ernando 11'	Report	19' Danilo; 75', 79', 82' Neymar	Stadium: Estádio Serra Dourada; Attendance: 2,865; Referee: Marcelo de Lima Henrique

28 November 37	Avaí	3–2	Santos	Florianópolis
17:00 UTC-02:00	Caio 40', 46', 81'	Report	9' Keirrison; 32' Neymar	Stadium: Ressacada; Attendance: 17,136; Referee: Sandro Meira Ricci

5 December 38	Santos	0–0	Flamengo	Santos
16:00 UTC-02:00		Report		Stadium: Estádio Urbano Caldeira (Vila Belmiro); Attendance: 9,086; Referee: Evandro Rogério Román

=== Campeonato Paulista ===
==== Results summary ====
Overall								Home						Away					
Pld	W	D	L	GF	GA	GD	Pts	W	D	L	GF	GA	GD	W	D	L	GF	GA	GD
23	18	2	3	72	33	+39	56	9	1	2	44	18	+26	9	1	1	28	15	+13

Last updated: 2 May 2010.
Source: Competitive matches

==== First stage ====
===== League table =====
Pos	Team	Pld	W	D	L	GF	GA	GD	Pts	Qualification or relegation
1	Santos	19	15	2	2	61	24	+37	47	Advanced to the Knockout stage
2	Santo André	19	11	4	4	45	27	+18	37	Advanced to the Knockout stage
3	Grêmio Prudente	19	11	4	4	34	28	+6	37	Advanced to the Knockout stage
4	São Paulo	19	11	3	5	41	19	+22	36	Advanced to the Knockout stage
5	Corinthians	19	10	5	4	32	18	+14	35	

Updated to match(es) played on 8 April 2010. Source: UOL Esporte
Rules for classification: 1st points; 2nd wins; 3rd goal difference; 4th goals scored; 5th red cards received; 6th yellow cards received; 7th public draw

===== Matches =====
17 January 1	Rio Branco	0–4	Santos	São Paulo
19:30 UTC-02:00		Report	2', 65' Paulo Henrique; 20', 89' Neymar	Stadium: Pacaembu; Attendance: 13,448; Referee: Marcelo Rogério

20 January 2	Santos	1–1	Ponte Preta	Santos
19:30 UTC-02:00	André 48'	Report	70' Jean Rolt	Stadium: Vila Belmiro; Attendance: 10,676; Referee: Wilson Luiz Seneme

24 January 3	Mogi Mirim	2–1	Santos	Mogi Mirim
19:30 UTC-02:00	Geovane 37', 80'	Report	30' Paulo Henrique	Stadium: Papa João Paulo II; Attendance: 2,317; Referee: Luiz Flávio de Oliveira

27 January 4	Santos	5–0	Grêmio Barueri	Santos
19:30 UTC-02:00	André 33'; Wesley 69'; Zé Eduardo 73'; Neymar 78', 87' (pen.)	Report		Stadium: Vila Belmiro; Attendance: 5,294; Referee: Rodrigo Guarizo Ferreira do Amaral

30 January 5	Santos	2–0	Oeste	Santos
19:30 UTC-02:00	André 51'; Neymar 89'	Report		Stadium: Vila Belmiro; Attendance: 10,393; Referee: Vinícius Furlan

4 February 6	Santo André	1–2	Santos	Santo André
21:00 UTC-02:00	Rodriguinho 38'	Report	24' Neymar; 65' Paulo Henrique	Stadium: Bruno José Daniel; Attendance: 9,822; Referee: Sálvio Spínola Fagundes Filho

7 February 7	São Paulo	1–2	Santos	Barueri
17:00 UTC-02:00	Roger 66'	Report	37' (pen.) Neymar; 86' Robinho	Stadium: Arena Barueri; Attendance: 14,519; Referee: Marcelo Rogério

14 February 8	Santos	2–1	Rio Claro	São Paulo
17:00 UTC-02:00	André 69'; Giovanni 88'	Report	39' Jackson	Stadium: Pacaembu; Attendance: 32,001; Referee: Leandro Bizzio Marinho

18 February 9	Santos	6–3	Bragantino	Santos
21:00 UTC-02:00	Wesley 23'; Robinho 27', 57'; André 40', 46'; Zé Eduardo 89'	Report	53' Diego Macedo; 73' (pen.) Frontini; 84' Rodriguinho	Stadium: Vila Belmiro; Attendance: 11,794; Referee: Leonardo Ferreira Lima

21 February 10	Mirassol	1–2	Santos	Mirassol
17:00 UTC-03:00	Gérson 36'	Report	26' Wesley; 58' Madson	Stadium: José Maria de Campos Maia; Attendance: 8,370; Referee: Fábio de Jesus Volpato Mendes

28 February 11	Santos	2–1	Corinthians	Santos
17:00 UTC-03:00	Neymar 33'; André 60'	Report	68' Dentinho	Stadium: Vila Belmiro; Attendance: 9,029; Referee: José Henrique de Carvalho

4 March 12	Paulista	2–3	Santos	Jundiaí
21:00 UTC-03:00	Barboza 2'; Julinho 56'	Report	26' Wesley; 52' Paulo Henrique; 68' Robinho	Stadium: Jayme Cintra; Attendance: 8,032; Referee: Wilson Luiz Seneme

7 March 13	Portuguesa	1–1	Santos	São Paulo
17:00 UTC-03:00	Héverton 14'	Report	89' Zé Eduardo	Stadium: Canindé; Attendance: 9,135; Referee: Rodrigo Braghetto

14 March 14	Santos	3–4	Palmeiras	Santos
17:00 UTC-03:00	Pará 9'; Neymar 30'; Madson 80'	Report	41', 43', 87' Robert; 56' Diego Souza	Stadium: Vila Belmiro; Attendance: 11,452; Referee: Antonio Rogério Batista do Prado

21 March 15	Santos	9–1	Ituano	São Paulo
19:30 UTC-03:00	André 14', 39', 90+1' (pen.); Paulo Henrique 22', 73'; Madson 45', 54'; Maikon Leite 61'; Zé Eduardo 85'	Report	1' João Leonardo	Stadium: Pacaembu; Attendance: 10,015; Referee: Robério Pereira Pires

25 March 16	Botafogo	2–4	Santos	Ribeirão Preto
21:00 UTC-03:00	Ademir Sopa 44' (pen.); Adriano 58'	Report	41' Paulo Henrique; 56', 67' Marquinhos; 89' Zé Eduardo	Stadium: Santa Cruz; Attendance: 11,171; Referee: Edson Reis Pavani Júnior

28 March 17	Santos	5–0	Monte Azul	Santos
18:30 UTC-03:00	Marquinhos 12', 64'; Paulo Henrique 34', 58'; André 72'	Report		Stadium: Vila Belmiro; Attendance: 11,929; Referee: Élcio Paschoal Borborema

4 April 18	São Caetano	1–3	Santos	São Caetano do Sul
18:30 UTC-03:00	Hugo 39'	Report	2' (o.g.) Hugo; 67' Neymar; 79' Robinho	Stadium: Anacleto Campanella; Attendance: 3,795; Referee: Guilherme Ceretta de Lima

7 April 19	Santos	4–2	Sertãozinho	Santos
21:50 UTC-03:00	Germano 6'; Alex Sandro 32'; Zé Eduardo 38'; Marcel 89'	Report	40', 56' (pen.) Thiago Silvy	Stadium: Vila Belmiro; Attendance: 2,060; Referee: Paulo Roberto Ferreira

==== Knockout stage ====
===== Semi-finals =====
11 April 1st Leg	São Paulo	2–3	Santos	São Paulo
16:00 UTC-03:00	Hernanes 52'; Dagoberto 66'	Report	25' (o.g.) Júnior César; 40' André; 89' Durval	Stadium: Morumbi; Attendance: 35,695; Referee: Marcelo Rogério

18 April 2nd Leg	Santos	3–0 (6–2 agg.)	São Paulo	Santos
16:00 UTC-03:00	Neymar 59', 82' (pen.); Paulo Henrique 87'	Report		Stadium: Vila Belmiro; Attendance: 13,785; Referee: José Henrique de Carvalho

===== Finals =====
25 April 1st Leg	Santo André	2–3	Santos	São Paulo
16:00 UTC-03:00	Bruno César 34'; Rodriguinho 82'	Report	57' André; 61', 69' Wesley	Stadium: Pacaembu; Attendance: 33,354; Referee: Paulo César de Oliveira

2 May 2nd Leg	Santos	2–3 (5–5 agg.)	Santo André	São Paulo
16:00 UTC-03:00	Neymar 7', 31'	Report	1' Nunes; 20' Alê; 43' Branquinho	Stadium: Pacaembu; Attendance: 36,260; Referee: Sálvio Spínola Fagundes Filho

=== Copa do Brasil ===
==== First round ====
24 February 1st Leg	Naviraiense	0–1	Santos	Campo Grande
21:50 UTC-03:00		Report	82' Marquinhos	Stadium: Morenão; Attendance: 7,062; Referee: Héber Roberto Lopes

10 March Replay	Santos	10–0 (11–0 agg.)	Naviraiense	Santos
21:50 UTC-03:00	Paulo Henrique 6'; André 27', 37', 59'; Neymar 28', 54'; Robinho 31'; Marquinhos 45'; Madson 65', 76'	Report		Stadium: Vila Belmiro; Attendance: 11,336; Referee: Pablo dos Santos Alves

==== Second round ====
18 March 1st Leg	Remo	0–4	Santos	Belém
21:00 UTC-03:00		Report	21', 81' (pen.) Neymar; 42', 48' André	Stadium: Mangueirão; Attendance: 19,445; Referee: Ricardo Marques Ribeiro

==== Round of 16 ====
15 April 1st Leg	Santos	8–1	Guarani	Santos
21:50 UTC-03:00	Neymar 2' (pen.), 29', 38', 81', 84'; Marcel 56' (pen.); Robinho 31', 59'	Report	73' Moreno	Stadium: Vila Belmiro; Attendance: 8,131; Referee: Francisco Carlos Nascimento

21 April 2nd Leg	Guarani	3–2 (4–10 agg.)	Santos	Campinas
19:30 UTC-03:00	Da Silva 51'; Richard Falcão 83', 90+2'	Report	56' Breitner; 65' Alex Sandro	Stadium: Brinco de Ouro; Attendance: 8,481; Referee: Elcio Paschoal Borborema

==== Quarter-finals ====
28 April 1st Leg	Atlético Mineiro	3–2	Santos	Belo Horizonte
21:50 UTC-03:00	Diego Tardelli 2', 40', 47'	Report	44' Robinho; 82' Edu Dracena	Stadium: Mineirão; Attendance: 46,239; Referee: Heber Roberto Lopes

5 May 2nd Leg	Santos	3–1 (5–4 agg.)	Atlético Mineiro	Santos
21:50 UTC-03:00	André 17'; Neymar 44'; Wesley 49'	Report	45' Corrêa	Stadium: Vila Belmiro; Attendance: 14,245; Referee: Jailson Macêdo Freitas

==== Semi-finals ====
12 May 1st Leg	Grêmio	4–3	Santos	Porto Alegre
21:50 UTC-03:00	Borges 58', 64', 75'; Jonas 68'	Report	15', 20' André; 83' Robinho	Stadium: Olímpico; Attendance: 35,215; Referee: Sandro Meira Ricci

19 May 2nd Leg	Santos	3–1 (6–5 agg.)	Grêmio	Santos
21:50 UTC-03:00	Paulo Henrique 51'; Robinho 69'; Wesley 85'	Report	74' Rafael Marques	Stadium: Vila Belmiro; Attendance: 13,896; Referee: Marcelo de Lima Henrique

==== Finals ====
28 July 1st Leg	Santos	2–0	Vitória	Santos
21:50 UTC-03:00	Neymar 14'; Marquinhos 83'	Report		Stadium: Vila Belmiro; Attendance: 14,060; Referee: Leonardo Gaciba da Silva

4 August 2nd Leg	Vitória	2–1 (2–3 agg.)	Santos	Salvador
21:50 UTC-03:00	Wallace 57'; Júnior 77'	Report (in Portuguese)	44' Edu Dracena	Stadium: Barradão; Attendance: 34,111; Referee: Carlos Eugênio Simon

=== Copa Sudamericana ===
==== Second round ====
12 August 1st Leg	Santos (Brazil)	1–3	(Brazil) Avaí	São Paulo
21:50 UTC-03:00	Zé Eduardo 69'	Report	17' Rudnei; 64', 76' Vandinho	Stadium: Pacaembu; Referee: (Brazil) Ricardo Marques Ribeiro

18 August 2nd Leg	Avaí (Brazil)	0–1 (3–2 agg.)	(Brazil) Santos	Florianópolis
21:50 UTC-03:00		Report	24' Zé Eduardo	Stadium: Ressacada; Referee: (Brazil) Evandro Román
