= Luciano Rissutt =

Brazilian footballer

Personal information
- Full name: Luciano Andrade Rissutt
- Date of birth: 22 January 1977 (age 49)
- Place of birth: Salvador, Bahia, Brazil
- Height: 1.79 m (5 ft 10 in)
- Position: Right back

Senior career*
Years	Team	Apps	(Gls)
1998–2000	Juventus-SP		
2000	Fluminense de Feira		
2001–2002	Mogi Mirim		
2003	Sport Recife		
2003	Portuguesa	18	(0)
2004–2005	Ponte Preta	34	(2)
2006–2007	Fluminense	18	(1)
2007	→ Vitória Guimarães (loan)	13	(2)
2007–2008	Boavista	19	(0)
2010	Ituano	0	(0)
- * Club domestic league appearances and goals

Luciano Andrade Rissutt (born 22 January 1977), or simply Rissutt, is a Brazilian footballer.

Rissutt started his career at Brazilian lower division. In 2004, he left for Ponte Preta of Campeonato Brasileiro Série A. In May 2005 he signed a new contract until December 2006. In early 2006 he left for Fluminense and in January 2007 left for Vitória Guimarães and won promotion back to top division as Liga de Honra runner-up. In the next season he signed a 2-year deal with Boavista of Portuguese Liga, but left the club after relegated.

In 2008, he trailed at Atlético Paranaense In 2010, he returned to São Paulo for Ituano, signed a contract until the end of 2010 Campeonato Paulista.
