= Modesto Roma Júnior =

Brazilian businessman (1952–2024)

Modesto Roma Jr.
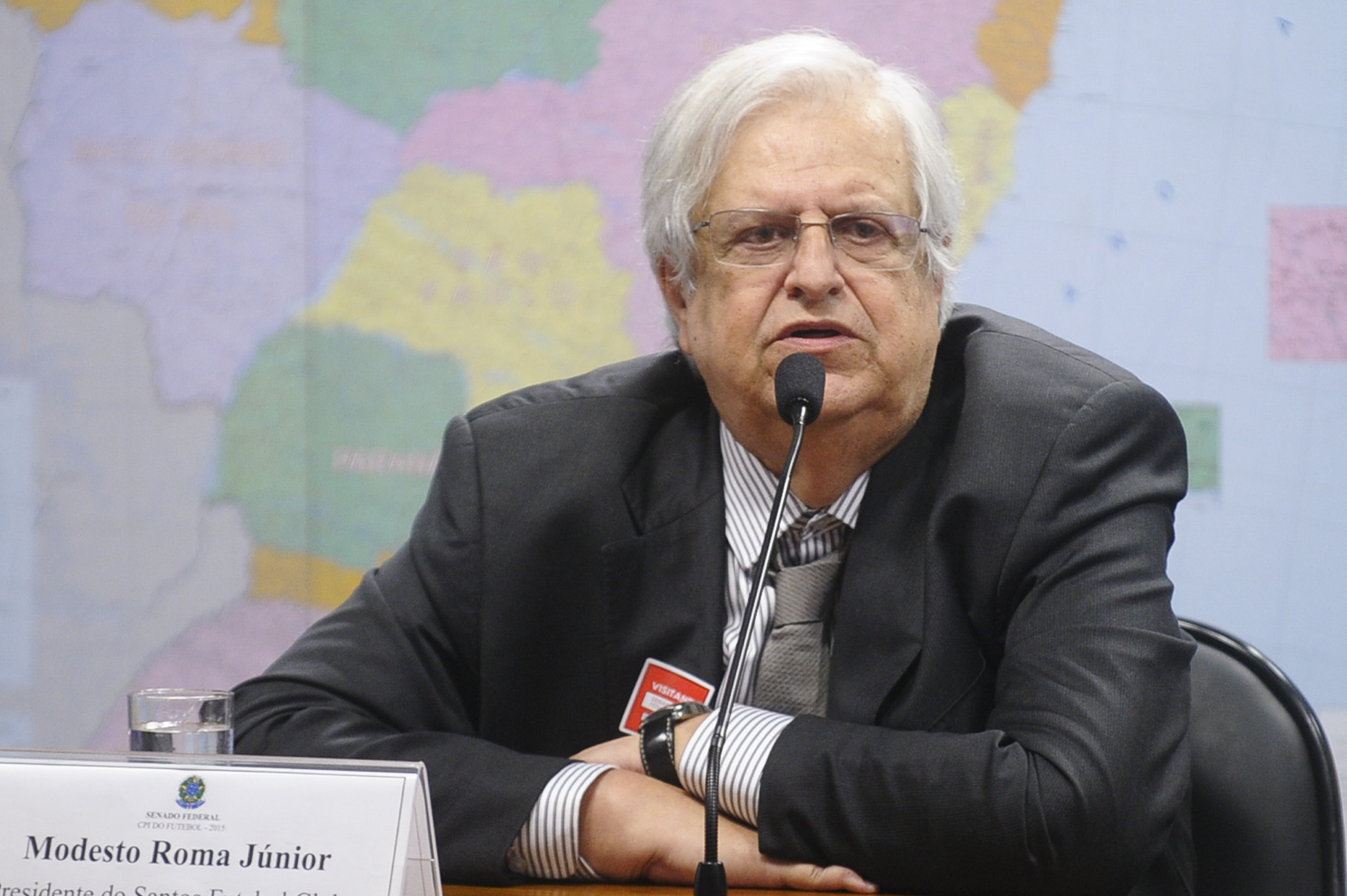

President of Santos FC
- In office 13 December 2014 – 10 December 2017
- Preceded by: Odílio Rodrigues
- Succeeded by: José Carlos Peres

Personal details
- Born: Modesto Roma Júnior; 5 December 1952 Santos, São Paulo, Brazil
- Died: 14 July 2024 (aged 71)
- Children: 2
- Education: UNISANTOS
- Profession: Journalist, businessman

Modesto Roma Júnior (5 December 1952 – 14 July 2024) was a Brazilian businessman of the communications industry, and was the president of Santos FC for three years.

== Personal life ==
Roma was born in Santos, São Paulo. A journalism graduate, he abandoned his initial career after only three years, and became a businessman in the communications area shortly after. He was also the son of Santos FC's former president Modesto Roma, who took charge of the club from 1975 to 1978.

Roma died on 14 July 2024, at the age of 71.

== Santos FC ==
A Santos director from 2004 to 2009, under Marcelo Teixeira's reign (president of the club from 2000 to 2009), Roma submitted his presidential candidacy on 20 October 2014, being supported by Teixeira. On 13 December he was elected the new president, after winning by 1,329 votes.

Roma officially took charge of Peixe on 1 January 2015, with the club immersed in a severe financial crisis left by the previous administration, with players having unpaid wages.

Roma saw Aranha, Arouca, Leandro Damião and Eugenio Mena take legal actions against the club due to unpaid wages, but only the Chilean had a favourable decision; he managed to reach agreements with the others, while Damião lost his case. He also managed to pay the players' wages on 30 January, while saving a total of R$23 million of wages in the year, due to the departures.

After only signing players without paying any fee, Roma managed to gather a successful team during his first year in charge of Santos, winning the Campeonato Paulista and being runner-up in the Copa do Brasil. He also created a reserve team to serve as a transition between the youth setup and the main squad, copying the idea from the biggest European teams.

After a successful first year, Roma was highly criticized by the supporters during the 2017 campaign, mainly due to Lucas Lima's contractual problems. He was succeeded by José Carlos Peres on 10 December 2017. Peres later revealed that Roma was using the club's corporate card for personal reasons, whilst also paying a total of R$24 million in agent fees.
