= List of Santos FC presidents =

Santos FC, nicknamed "Peixe", is a football club based in Santos, Brazil that competes in the Campeonato Paulista, São Paulo's state league, and the Campeonato Brasileiro Série A, Brazil's national league. Since its founding in 1912, the club has had 35 different presidents. The president has the responsibility for the overall management of the club, including formally signing contracts with players and staff.

== List of presidents ==
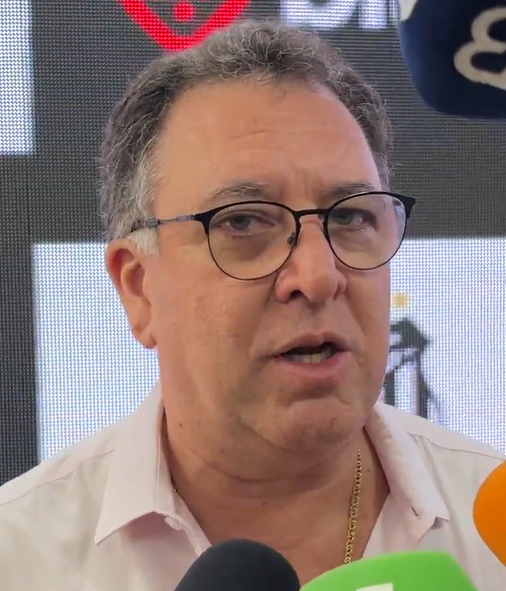
Marcelo Teixeira is one of the longest-serving presidents of Santos, with 12 years of tenure in two terms

Below is the official presidential history of Santos FC, from when Sizino Patuska took over at the club in 1912, until the present day.

Name	Nationality (Note: The information in the nationality column is according to how they were then referred to, and may not reflect their then, or current, citizenship or birthplace)	From	To	Honours
Sizino Patusca	Brazilian	1912	1913	Campeonato Santista
Raymundo Marques	Brazilian	1913	1914	
Agnelo Cícero de Oliveira	Brazilian	1914	1917	Campeonato Santista
Flamínio Levy	Brazilian	1917	1918	
Wallace Simonsen	Brazilian	1918	1919	
Flamínio Levy	Brazilian	1919	1920	
Agnelo Cícero de Oliveira	Brazilian	1920	1921	
Flamínio Levy	Brazilian	1921	1922	
Armando Lichti	Brazilian	1922	1923	
Flamínio Levy	Brazilian	1923		
Manoel Oliveira Alfaya	Brazilian	1923	1925	
Antônio Guilherme Gonçalves	Brazilian	1925	1931	
Joaquim Pedro dos Santos	Brazilian	1931	1932	
Carlos de Barros	Brazilian	1933	1937	
Frederico Jorge Sobrinho	Brazilian	1937		
José Martins	Brazilian	1937	1940	Campeonato Paulista
Benedito Wenceslau Carneiro	Brazilian	1940		
Jaime Matias Ricão	Brazilian	1940		
Romeu de Andrade Lourenço	Brazilian	1940	1942	
Aristóteles Ferreira	Brazilian	1942	1944	
Antônio Ezequiel Feliciano da Silva	Brazilian	1944	1945	
Athiê Jorge Coury	Brazilian	1945	1971	Campeonato Paulista (11), Torneio Rio-São Paulo (4), Campeonato Brasileiro Série A (6), (Note: Includes results from the Taça Brasil and the Robertão.) Copa Libertadores (2), Recopa Sudamericana, Intercontinental Cup (2), Intercontinental Supercup
Vasco José Fae	Brazilian	1971	1975	Campeonato Paulista
Modesto Roma	Brazilian	1975	1978	Campeonato Paulista
Rubens Quintas Ovalle	Brazilian	1978	1982	
Ernesto Vieira da Silva	Brazilian	1982	1983	
Milton Teixeira	Brazilian	1983	1987	Campeonato Paulista
Manuel dos Santos Sá	Brazilian	1987	1988	
Miguel Assad Macool Filho	Brazilian	1988	1989	
Antônio Aguiar Filho	Brazilian	1989	1991	
Marcelo Pirilo Teixeira	Brazilian	1991	1993	
Miguel Kodja Neto	Brazilian	1994		
Samir Jorge Abdul-Hak	Brazilian	1994	1999	Copa CONMEBOL, Torneio Rio-São Paulo
Marcelo Pirilo Teixeira	Brazilian	1999	2009	Campeonato Paulista (2), Copa Paulista de Futebol, Campeonato Brasileiro Série A (2)
Luis Álvaro de Oliveira Ribeiro	Brazilian	2009	2014	Campeonato Paulista (3), Copa do Brasil, Copa Libertadores, Recopa Sudamericana
Odílio Rodrigues	Brazilian	2014		
Modesto Roma Júnior	Brazilian	2015	2018	Campeonato Paulista (2)
José Carlos Peres	Brazilian	2018	2020	
Orlando Rollo	Brazilian	2020		
Andrés Rueda	Brazilian	2021	2023	
Marcelo Pirilo Teixeira	Brazilian	2024		
