= Zezinho (footballer, born March 1992) =

Brazilian footballer

Personal information
- Full name: José Luís dos Santos Pinto
- Date of birth: 14 March 1992 (age 34)
- Place of birth: Rio Grande do Sul, Brazil
- Height: 1.74 m (5 ft 8 1/2 in)
- Positions: Left winger; attacking midfielder

Team information
- Current team: Joinville

Youth career
- Juventude

Senior career*
Years	Team	Apps	(Gls)
2009–2010	Juventude	21	(2)
2010	→ Santos (loan)	14	(0)
2010–2013	Deportivo Maldonado	0	(0)
2011	→ Bahia (loan)	1	(0)
2012–2017	Atlético Paranaense	31	(1)
2014	→ Chapecoense (loan)	17	(1)
2014	→ Atlético Goianiense (loan)	4	(0)
2015	→ Nacional (loan)	1	(0)
2016	→ Ceará (loan)	0	(0)
2017–2018	Paraná	14	(0)
2018	São Bento	9	(1)
2020	Rio Branco	0	(0)
2020–	Joinville	0	(0)

International career
2009	Brazil U-17	3	(0)
- * Club domestic league appearances and goals as of 22:51, 13 August 2020 (UTC)

José Luis dos Santos Pinto better known as Zezinho (born 14 March 1992), is a Brazilian football player who plays for Joinville. He has also played for the Brazilian national youth teams.

== Career ==
=== Juventude ===
Zezinho began his football career at Juventude and was promoted to the A team in 2008. On 3 June 2009, he made his first team debut in a 1–0 home loss against Paraná, coming on as a second-half substitute, replacing Edimar. Two weeks later, Zezinho was sent off for first time in his senior career, during a game against Bragantino. On 5 August, he scored his first goal for Juventude against Portuguesa. Zezinho then scored in Juventude's 2–0 win over Fortaleza on 19 September 2009, taking his tally for the season to 2 goals. He earned 21 Série B appearances.

=== Santos (loan) ===
On 10 February 2010, Zezinho was loaned out to Série A club Santos. He was assigned the number 8 shirt. Zezinho made his competitive début for Santos in the Campeonato Paulista on 8 April 2010, starting alongside Zé Eduardo in attack in Santos's 4–2 victory over Sertãozinho. On 6 June, in a Série A match against Vasco da Gama, he assisted Madson for the fourth goal as Santos cruised to a 4–0 win.

Then Zezinho transferred to Deportivo Maldonado on 18 August 2010, and immediately rejoined Santos on a loan deal until December 2011.

=== Bahia (loan) ===
On 30 December 2010, Bahia announced they had reached agreement for the loan of Zezinho to the club for the 2011 season. Few days later his loan contract with Santos was terminated by mutual consent. He made only one appearance for the club in Série A until he requested the termination of his contract with Bahia in November 2011.

== Statistics ==
Updated 18 December 2011.

Club	Season	Brasileirão		Gaúcho		Copa do Brasil		Continental		Total	
Club	Season	Apps	Goals	Apps	Goals	Apps	Goals	Apps	Goals	Apps	Goals
Juventude	2009	21	2	8	0	0	0	–	–	29	2
Juventude	2010	0	0	1	0	0	0	–	–	1	0
Juventude	Total	21	2	9	0	0	0	0	0	30	2
Club	Season	Brasileirão		Paulista		Copa do Brasil		Continental		Total	
Club	Season	Apps	Goals	Apps	Goals	Apps	Goals	Apps	Goals	Apps	Goals
Santos	2010	14	0	1	0	0	0	–	–	15	0
Santos	Total	14	0	0	0	0	0	0	0	15	0
Club	Season	Brasileirão		Baiano		Copa do Brasil		Continental		Total	
Club	Season	Apps	Goals	Apps	Goals	Apps	Goals	Apps	Goals	Apps	Goals
Bahia	2011	1	0	8	0	3	0	–	–	12	0
Bahia	Total	1	0	8	0	3	0	0	0	12	0
