= Luis Álvaro de Oliveira Ribeiro =

President of Santos FC
- In office December 5, 2010 – May 15, 2014
- Preceded by: Marcelo Teixeira
- Succeeded by: Odílio Rodrigues

Personal details
- Born: Luis Álvaro de Oliveira Ribeiro; December 16, 1942 Santos, São Paulo, Brazil
- Died: August 16, 2016 (aged 73) São Paulo, Brazil

Luis Álvaro de Oliveira Ribeiro (December 16, 1942 – August 16, 2016), commonly known as LAOR, was a Brazilian businessman of the real estate industry. He was president of Santos FC from 2009 to 2014.

== History ==
Born in Santos on December 16, 1942, Luis Álvaro Ribeiro de Oliveira was the Santos FC's advisor for 17 years, Luis was a presidential candidate in 2003 from the entrepreneur Marcelo Teixeira, reaching 990 votes. "My doctor and my family called me crazy for taking the candidacy, because in July 2003 I had suffered a stroke and four heart attacks. But the love for Santos spoke louder, and two months after seeing death up close I was there as a candidate", says Luís Álvaro.

== Santos FC ==
In November 2009, in an election marked by protests, Luis won with 62% of the votes - 1882 votes, the highest quorum in club history - defeating Marcelo Teixeira, who since then had remained in the presidency of the club. His first title as Santos FC president was the 2010 Campeonato Paulista.

Luis Álvaro was the 35th president of Santos FC. One of his greatest achievements was the repatriation of the idol Robinho, signed on loan from Manchester City, England. To be successful in the negotiation, Luis Álvaro counted with the help of partners, through quotas, helped pay the salaries of the player. After winning the 2010 Campeonato Paulista being for only five months in command of the Santos FC executive, Luis Alvaro reaches another notable achievement: leading the club to their second title in 2010, the 2010 Copa do Brasil, the first of Santos' history. Since 1968, Santos not won two titles in the same year.

LAOR renewed the contract of striker Neymar for five years, and in 2010 signed Elano. In 2011, the club won the Campeonato Paulista and the Libertadores.

LAOR resigned from the presidency of the club in 2012, due to health problems; Odílio Rodrigues succeeded him as interim president.

=== Trophies won by club during presidency ===
- Campeonato Paulista (3):
  - 2010, 2011, 2012
- Copa do Brasil (1):
  - 2010
- Copa Libertadores (1):
  - 2011
- Recopa Sudamericana (1):
  - 2012
