= Zé Eduardo (footballer, born 1987) =

Brazilian footballer

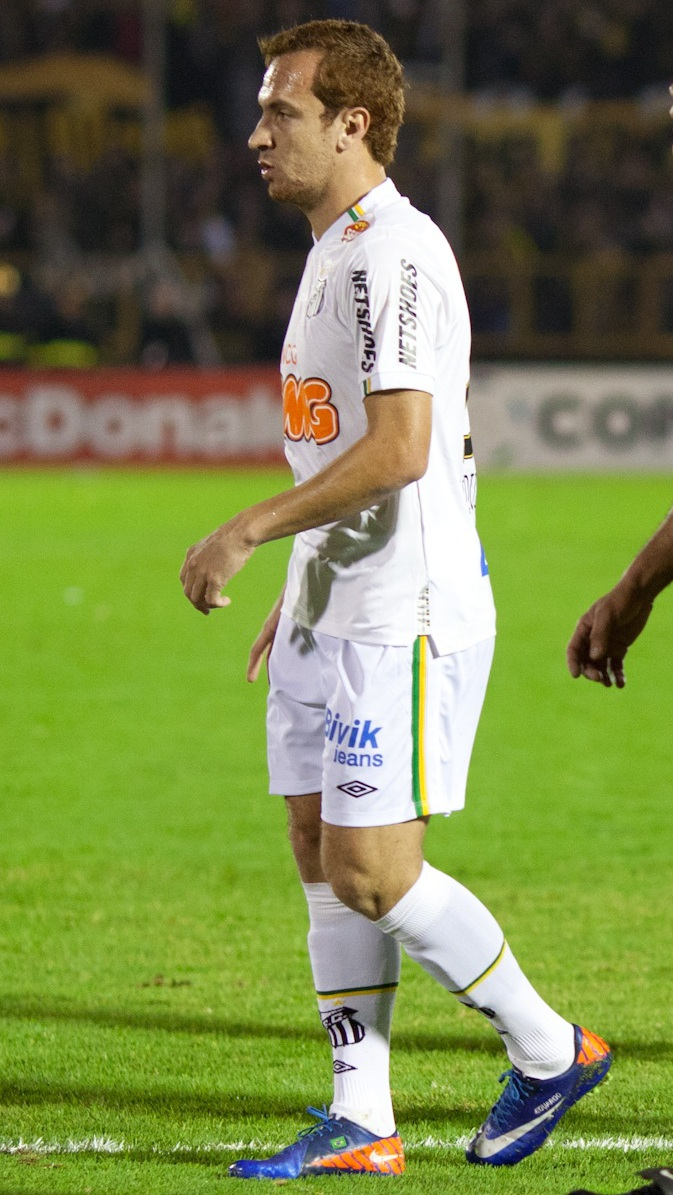

Personal information
- Full name: José Eduardo Bischofe de Almeida
- Date of birth: 29 October 1987 (age 39)
- Place of birth: Promissão, Brazil
- Height: 1.83 m (6 ft 0 in)
- Position: Forward

Senior career*
Years	Team	Apps	(Gls)
2004–2005	Palmeiras	2	(0)
2005	Portuguesa Santista	0	(0)
2005–2006	Atlético Paranaense	0	(0)
2006–2007	Cruzeiro	0	(0)
2006	→ Villa Nova (loan)	0	(0)
2006	→ Ipatinga (loan)	0	(0)
2007	→ Sport (loan)	0	(0)
2007–2008	Grêmio	0	(0)
2008	→ Ferroviária (loan)	0	(0)
2008–2010	Pinheiros	0	(0)
2008	→ Fortaleza (loan)	8	(0)
2009	→ São Caetano (loan)	12	(1)
2009	→ América (MG) (loan)	10	(0)
2009	→ ABC (loan)	9	(3)
2010	→ Santos (loan)	0	(0)
2010–2011	Santos	44	(13)
2011–2015	Genoa	10	(0)
2012–2013	→ Siena (loan)	9	(2)
2014	→ Coritiba (loan)	32	(5)
2015	Shanghai Shenxin	11	(1)
2015–2016	Goiás	15	(3)
2016	Al-Shaab CSC	12	(4)
2016–2017	Vitória	13	(4)
2017–2018	Figueirense	10	(3)
2018	Al-Faisaly	8	(1)
2018	Oeste	6	(0)
2019	Pahang	13	(4)
2019–2022	Brasiliense	27	(13)
2022–2023	Cianorte	2	(1)
2023	Iguatu	4	(1)
- * Club domestic league appearances and goals as of 2 November 2023

José Eduardo Bischofe de Almeida or simply Zé Eduardo, also known as Zé Love (born 29 October 1987), is a Brazilian footballer who last played for Iguatu.

Zé Eduardo holds an Italian passport.

== Career ==
=== Early career ===
Zé Eduardo started his professional career in Palmeiras. During his stay at the club, José Eduardo earned the moniker of "Zé Love" and "God of Goalscorer" in a comparison with Palmeiras' standout striker Vagner Love because of his "very impressive" goal scoring stats. After an unremarkable stint at the São Paulo club, Zé Eduardo played for Portuguesa Santista, Atlético Paranaense, Cruzeiro (who bought 70% of the player's economic rights for R$ 300,000), Bragantino (2006 Campeonato Paulista), Ipatinga (April – May 2006), Villa Nova (2006 Taça Minas Gerais), Sport (January – August 2007), Grêmio (2007 Copa FGF), Ferroviária (2008 Campeonato Paulista Série A2) and Fortaleza (2008 Brasileiro Série B), also to no success. In December 2008, Zé Eduardo joined São Caetano's squad for the 2009 Campeonato Paulista, scoring only one goal for the team, but proving himself to be a valuable player for the team. After a short stint in América from Minas Gerais, Zé Eduardo joined Natal's ABC, where he drew the attention of the larger clubs after scoring three goals in nine matches.

=== Santos ===
Joining Santos with no fanfare, Zé Eduardo went on to find great glory at the Vila Belmiro club, at first on loan. Starting off as a substitute, Eduardo played remarkably well, eventually earning a place in the starting 11. Winning the Paulistão and the Copa do Brasil, Zé Eduardo was one of the best players of the Santos squad, scoring a hat-trick against Fluminense at Estádio Olímpico Nilton Santos, while Maracaña was under construction. Zé Eduardo was the team joint-fourth-scorer of the team in the Paulistão with 6 goals (along with Wesley), behind Neymar, André Felipe, Ganso. In the 2010 Campeonato Brasileiro Série A, Zé Eduardo scored 10 times, just 7 goals short of Neymar. Zé Eduardo's goals were ranked second in Santos and joint-8th in the league.

After playing for several teams, Zé Eduardo accepted an offer from Italian Serie A club Genoa, signing a five-year contract on 23 January 2011. It was impossible for him to join Genoa before the closing of the international transfer window because his Italian passport issuance was delayed. Consequently, Genoa allowed him to play for his former club Santos until 22 June (while during that 6 months his contract was owned by FC Lugano). On that day, he started for Santos in the second leg of the 2011 Copa Libertadores Finals, which Santos won 2–1 over Uruguayan powerhouse Peñarol. Santos received R$ 6.088 million (about €2.7M), as Santos owned 60% of the player's economic rights. Genoa announced that they paid €5.4 million to its sister club Lugano in its 2011 annual financial report.

=== Genoa ===
Zé Eduardo was formally signed by Genoa in the summer of 2011 and his contract was recorded by Lega Serie A on 3 August 2011. He featured in a pre-season friendly, but after a long intensive season in Brazil, he was injured and trained away from the main squad. Zé Eduardo made his official club debut on 2 December 2011, in a 2–0 defeat by Milan. He had a medical with West Ham United in late January 2012 but the loan deal collapsed. Returning to Italy, he made four appearances as a substitute. The first on 12 February. He played no games in March and did not appear again until 29 April 2012, again as a substitute. His squad number 9 was taken away and given to Italian international Alberto Gilardino with Zé Eduardo being given the number 57 shirt; a number usually taken by players left outside the main squad.

Zé Eduardo refused a trial with A.C. Milan on 22 August 2012, which would have seen him replace the injured Alexandre Pato. Zé Eduardo is quoted as saying, "I have won one Libertadores and two Campeonatos Paulistas with Santos, I don't do tests".

On 20 January 2014, he was signed by Coritiba on loan until the end of the season.

== Career statistics ==
As of 1 July 2016

Club	Season	League		Cup		Continental		State League		Total	
Club	Season	Apps	Goals	Apps	Goals	Apps	Goals	Apps	Goals	Apps	Goals
São Caetano (loan)	2009	0	0	0	0	-	-	14	1	14	1
São Caetano (loan)	Total	0	0	0	0	0	0	14	1	14	1
ABC (loan)	2009	9	3	0	0	-	-	-	-	9	3
ABC (loan)	Total	9	3	0	0	0	0	0	0	9	3
Santos	2010	28	10	6	0	2	2	15	6	51	18
Santos	2011	1	0	6	0	13	1	16	7	30	8
Santos	Total	29	10	6	0	15	3	31	13	81	26
Genoa	2011–12	9	0	1	0	-	-	-	-	10	0
Genoa	Total	9	0	1	0	0	0	0	0	10	0
Siena (loan)	2012–13	8	1	1	1	-	-	-	-	9	2
Siena (loan)	Total	8	1	1	1	0	0	0	0	9	2
Genoa	2013–14	1	0	0	0	-	-	-	-	1	0
Genoa	Total	1	0	0	0	-	-	-	-	1	0
Shanghai Shenxin	2015	11	1	0	0	-	-	-	-	11	1
Shanghai Shenxin	Total	10	1	0	0	-	-	-	-	11	1
Goiás	2015	15	3	0	0	0	0	-	-	15	3
Goiás	Total	15	3	0	0	0	0	-	-	15	3
Al-Shaab	2016	12	4	-	-	-	-	-	-	12	4
Al-Shaab	Total	12	4	-	-	-	-	-	-	12	4
Career Total		94	22	8	1	15	3	45	14	162	40

== Honours ==
Villa Nova

- Taça Minas Gerais: 2006

Sport

- Campeonato Pernambucano: 2007

Santos

- Campeonato Paulista: 2010, 2011
- Copa do Brasil: 2010
- Copa Libertadores: 2011
