= Arouca (footballer) =

Brazilian footballer (born 1986)

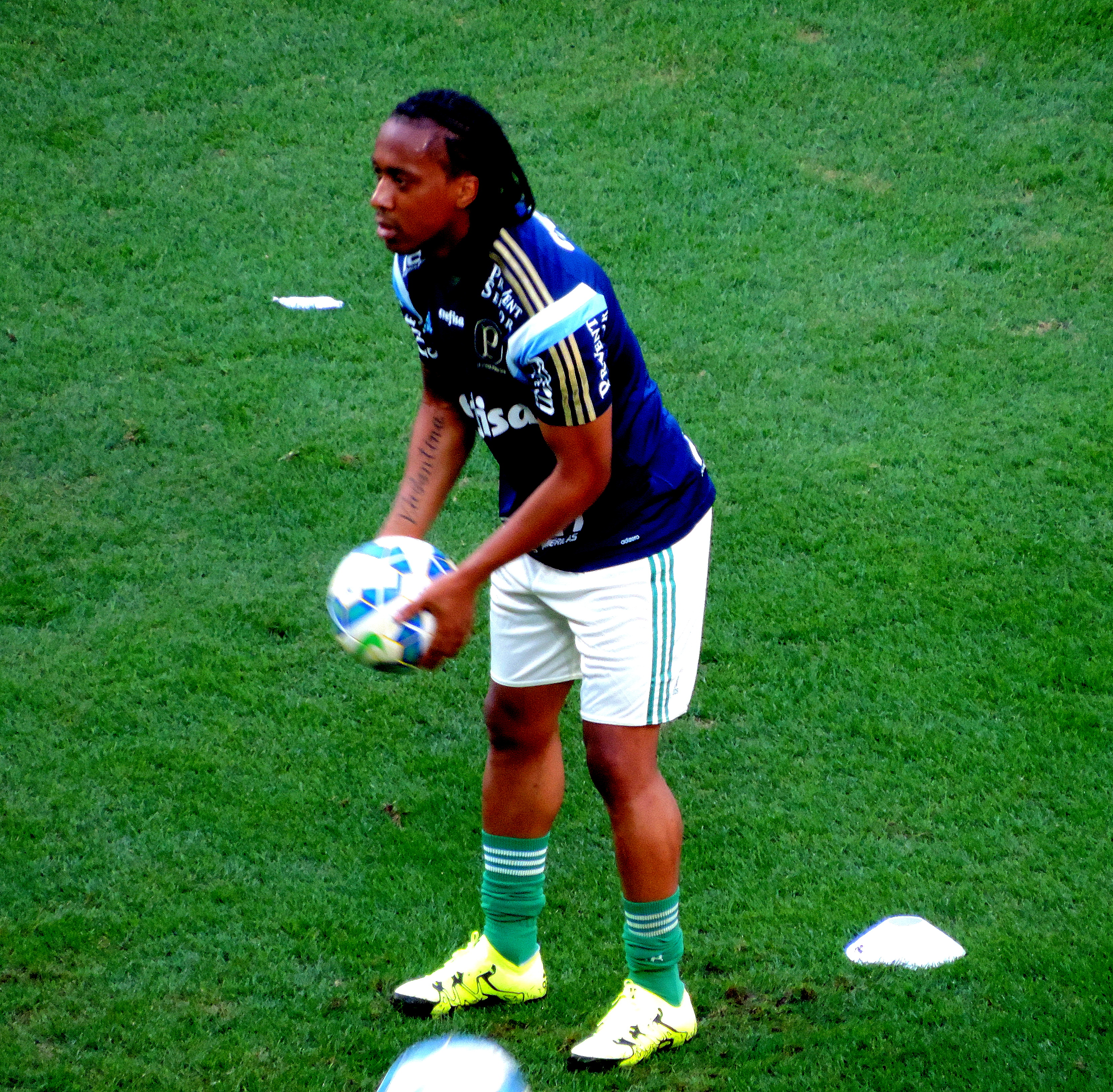
- Arouca with Palmeiras in 2015

Personal information
- Full name: Marcos Arouca da Silva
- Date of birth: 11 August 1986 (age 40)
- Place of birth: Duas Barras, Brazil
- Height: 1.71 m (5 ft 7 in)
- Position: Defensive midfielder

Youth career
- 2000–2003: Fluminense

Senior career*
Years	Team	Apps	(Gls)
2004–2008	Fluminense	122	(8)
2009–2010	São Paulo	21	(0)
2010	→ Santos (loan)	7	(0)
2010–2015	Santos	136	(1)
2015–2018	Palmeiras	25	(0)
2018	→ Atlético Mineiro (loan)	0	(0)
2018	→ Vitória (loan)	11	(0)
2020	Figueirense	5	(0)

International career
2003	Brazil U17	6	(1)
2005	Brazil U20	7	(0)
2012–2013	Brazil	4	(0)
- * Club domestic league appearances and goals

Marcos Arouca da Silva (born 11 August 1986), commonly known as Arouca, is a Brazilian former professional footballer who played as a defensive midfielder.

== Club career ==
=== Fluminense ===
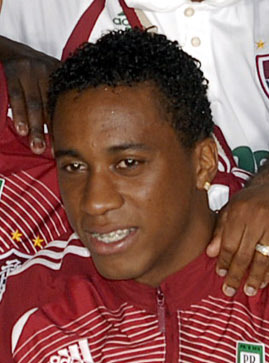
Arouca with Fluminense in 2007

Born in Duas Barras, Arouca made his professional debuts with Fluminense in 2004 Brasileirão, appearing 10 times. In the following year he appeared regularly with the side, and scored his first professional goal on 25 September 2005, netting his side's first of a 4–3 home success over Santos.

In 2007 Arouca played regularly during the Copa do Brasil winning campaign, and also appeared in 30 matches in the league with Flu finishing fourth. In the following year he was again starter, also being runner-up of that year's Copa Libertadores. In September 2008 he completed 200 matches for Fluminense, finishing the season with 54 appearances overall.

=== São Paulo ===
On 23 December 2008, Arouca agreed a five-year deal with São Paulo. He made his debut for Tricolor on 21 January 2009, coming on as a second-half substitute in a 1–1 home draw against Ituano.

However, Arouca served only as a backup to Hernanes and Richarlyson in his only season, and only started in 25 of the 40 matches played in 2009.

=== Santos ===
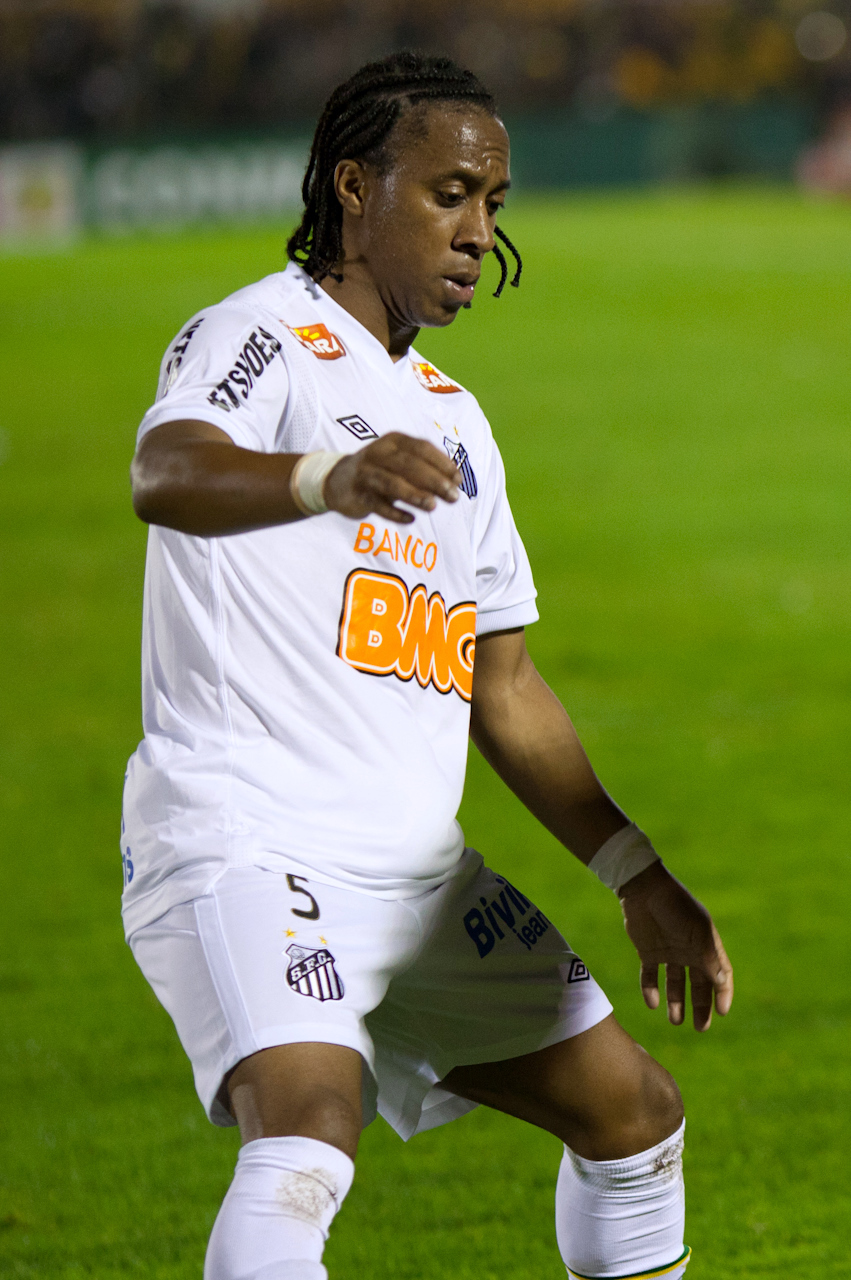
Arouca with Santos in 2011

On 19 January 2010, Arouca joined Santos in an on-year loan deal, with Rodrigo Souto moving in the opposite direction. He made his debut for the club late in the month, playing the last 28 minutes in a 2–0 home win over Oeste. As a starter, Arouca was a key defensive unit in that year's Copa do Brasil and Paulista winning campaigns. On 23 July 2010, Santos bought him outright, signing a four-year deal for a €3.5 million fee.

In the following year Arouca was again ever-present, scoring his first goal for Peixe on 15 May 2011, netting the first of a 2–1 home success over Corinthians, in 2011 Campeonato Paulista final. He was also starter during the Copa Libertadores and FIFA Club World Cup, which Santos finished champions and runner-up, respectively; Arouca also assisted Neymar in the first goal of the Libertadores' final.

Arouca was again an ever-present figure during 2012, winning his third consecutive Paulistão, also scoring his second goal for Santos on 29 February, against Guarani. On 23 August 2013, he renewed his link with Peixe, running until the end of 2016.

In March 2014, Arouca was racially abused by the crowd in a state championship game against Mogi Mirim. The abuse was condemned by the nation's president Dilma Rousseff, who invited Arouca to meet her at the Palácio do Planalto along with two others who had suffered similarly, Cruzeiro player Tinga and gaúcho referee Márcio Chagas.

On 9 January 2015, Arouca took a legal action against Santos due to unpaid wages, despite previously stating that he would not make such action; on the 29th, after lengthy negotiations, he rescinded his link with the club and removed his legal action, with Santos also retaining 40% of his rights.

=== Palmeiras ===
One day after rescinding with Santos, Arouca signed a four-year deal with Palmeiras.

== International career ==
After appearing with Brazil under-17 and under-20's squads, Arouca made his debut with the main squad on 7 September 2012, coming on as a late substitute in a 1–0 success over South Africa.

Despite the call ups and playing in four games, Arouca failed to impress in his performances with the national squad and as a result, he never solidified a position within the team; he was left out of the squad after the replacement of the former coach Mano Menezes by Luiz Felipe Scolari.

== Career statistics ==
As of 6 November 2023

Appearances and goals by club, season and competition
Club	Season	League		National cup		Continental		State League		Other (Note: Including FIFA Club World Cup and Recopa Sudamericana)		Total	
Club	Season	Apps	Goals	Apps	Goals	Apps	Goals	Apps	Goals	Apps	Goals	Apps	Goals
Fluminense	2004	10	0	–		–		0	0	–		10	0
Fluminense	2005	34	3	12	0	5	0	14	0	–		65	3
Fluminense	2006	19	0	4	0	1	1	2	0	–		26	1
Fluminense	2007	30	4	7	0	–		8	0	–		45	4
Fluminense	2008	29	1	–		13	0	12	0	–		54	1
Fluminense	Total	122	8	23	0	19	1	36	0	0	0	200	9
São Paulo	2009	21	0	–		3	0	16	0	–		40	0
Santos	2010	28	0	9	0	2	0	15	0	–		54	0
Santos	2011	26	0	–		10	0	5	1	2	0	43	1
Santos	2012	31	0	–		12	0	17	1	2	0	62	1
Santos	2013	26	0	4	0	–		18	0	–		48	0
Santos	2014	32	1	8	1	–		17	2	–		57	4
Santos	Total	143	1	21	1	24	0	72	4	4	0	264	6
Palmeiras	2015	22	0	7	0	–		11	0	–		40	0
Palmeiras	2016	2	0	1	0	3	0	12	0	–		18	0
Palmeiras	2017	1	0	–		0	0	0	0	–		1	0
Palmeiras	Total	25	0	8	0	3	0	23	0	0	0	59	0
Atlético Mineiro	2018	0	0	5	0	0	0	7	0	–		12	0
Vitória	2018	11	0	–		–		–		–		11	0
Figueirense	2020	20	0	1	0	–		6	0	–		27	0
Career total		342	9	58	1	49	1	160	4	4	0	613	15

== Honours ==
Fluminense

- Rio de Janeiro State League: 2005
- Copa do Brasil: 2007

Santos

- Campeonato Paulista: 2010, 2011, 2012
- Copa do Brasil: 2010
- Copa Libertadores: 2011
- Recopa Sudamericana: 2012

Palmeiras

- Copa do Brasil: 2015
- Campeonato Brasileiro Série A: 2016

=== Individual ===
- Campeonato Paulista Team of the year: 2010, 2014, 2015
