= Duas Barras =

- Municipality
- Município de Duas Barras
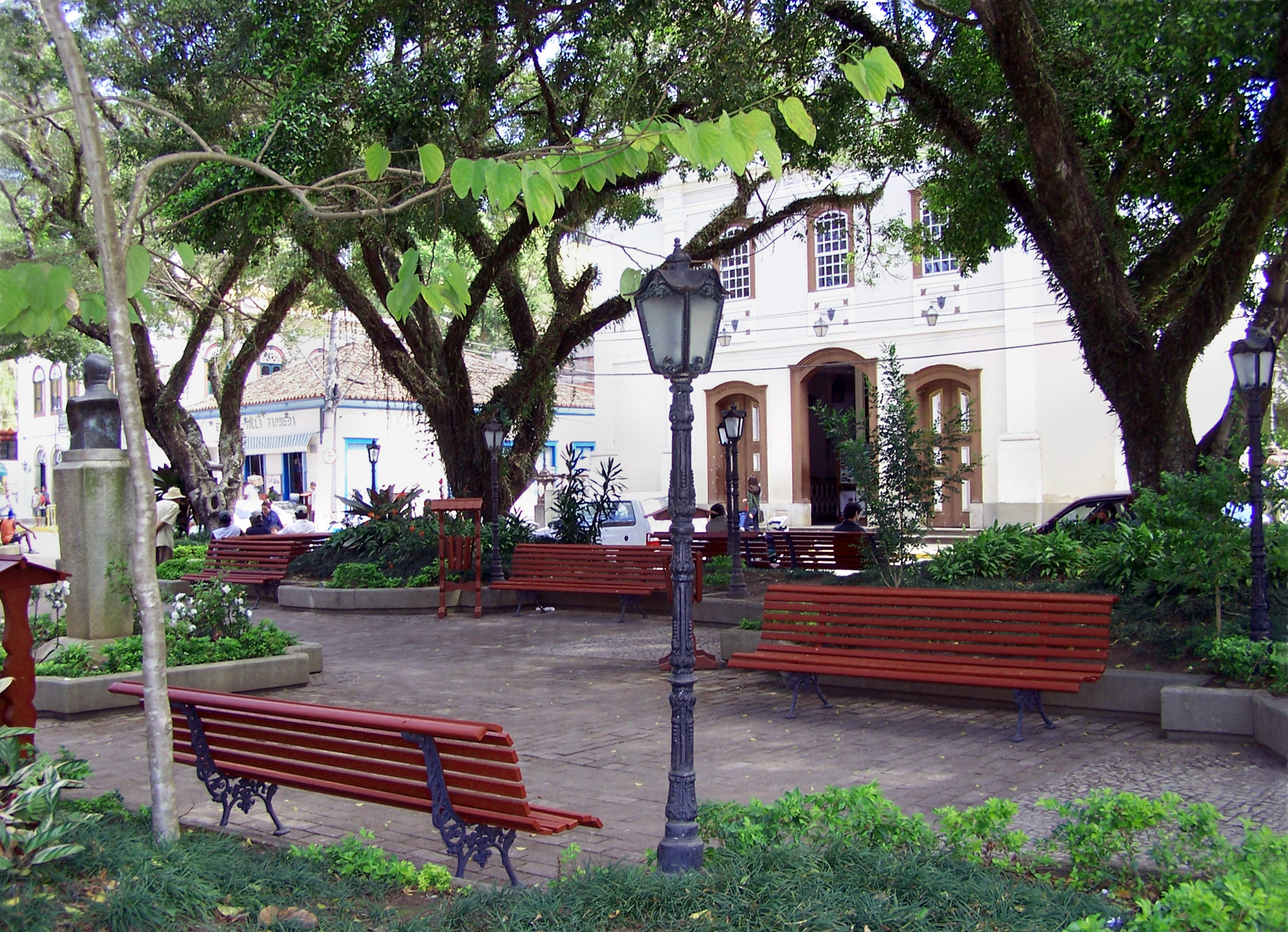
- Main Square

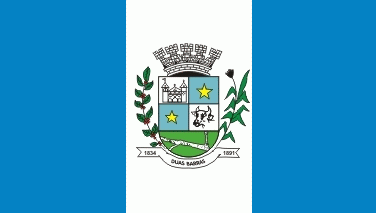
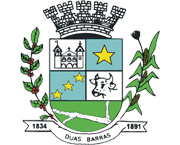
- Flag Coat of arms
- Motto: Ser carioca da serra é viver em ousadia e alegria
- Location of Duas Barras in the state of Rio de Janeiro

- Location of Duas Barras in Brazil
- Coordinates: 22°03′03″S 42°31′19″W
- Country: Brazil
- Region: Southeast
- State: Rio de Janeiro

Government
  - Prefeito: Armando Rosemberto Mattos Teixeira (Solidarity Party, 2025–2028)

Area
  - Total: 379.619 km^{2} (146.572 sq mi)
- Elevation: 530 m (1,740 ft)

Population (2021)
  - Total: 11,563
- Time zone: UTC-3

Duas Barras (Portuguese pronunciation: [ˈduɐz ˈbaʁɐs]) is a municipality located in the Brazilian state of Rio de Janeiro. Its population was 11,563 in 2021, and its area is 379.619 km^{2} (146.572 sq mi).

The town has a historic centre with colourful painted homes around its main square.
