= Araújo (footballer, born 1984) =

Brazilian footballer

Personal information
- Full name: Adolpho Araújo Netto
- Date of birth: March 2, 1984 (age 42)
- Place of birth: São Paulo, Brazil
- Height: 1.72 m (5 ft 8 in)
- Position: Forward

Youth career
- –2004: São Paulo

Senior career*
Years	Team	Apps	(Gls)
2005–2006	Atlético Sorocaba		
2006	Sampaio Corrêa		
2007	Jataiense		
2007	Taboão da Serra		
2008	Botafogo Ribeirão Preto		
2008–2009	Taboão da Serra		
2008–2009	→ Rio Claro (loan)		
2009–2010	Grêmio Prudente	5	(1)
2009	→ Red Bull Brasil (loan)		
2011	Red Bull Brasil		
2011–2012	Marília		
2012	Rio Claro		
2012	Uberaba		
2012–2013	Nacional Atlético Clube (SP)		
2013–2014	Taboão da Serra		
- * Club domestic league appearances and goals as of October 16, 2010

Adolpho Araújo Netto (born March 2, 1984), known as Araújo, is a Brazilian former professional footballer who played as a forward.

== Career statistics ==
(Correct as of October 16, 2010)

Club	Season	State League		Brazilian Série A		Copa do Brasil		Copa Libertadores		Copa Sudamericana		Total	
Club	Season	Apps	Goals	Apps	Goals	Apps	Goals	Apps	Goals	Apps	Goals	Apps	Goals
Grêmio Prudente	2010	7	4	5	1	-	-	-	-	-	-	12	5
Total		7	4	5	1	-	-	-	-	-	-	12	5
