= Marcelo Teixeira =

Brazilian businessman (born 1964)

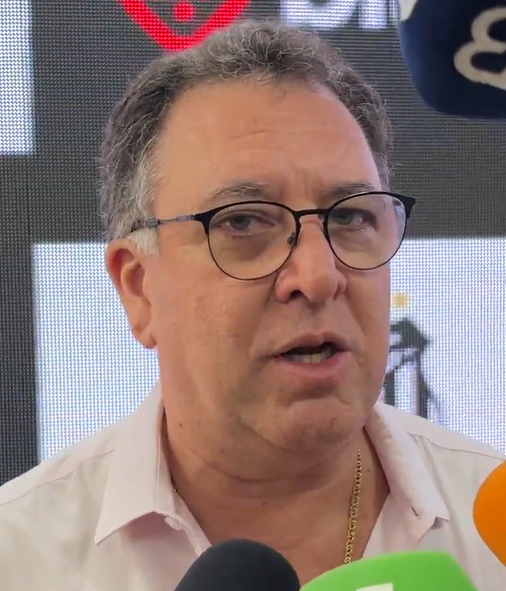
- Teixeira in 2024

President of Santos FC
- Incumbent
- Assumed office 1 January 2024
- Vice President: Fernando Bonavides
- Preceded by: Andrés Rueda
- In office 1 January 2000 – 31 December 2009
- Preceded by: Samir Jorge Abdul-Hak
- Succeeded by: Luis Álvaro de Oliveira Ribeiro
- In office 7 January 1992 – 31 December 1993
- Vice President: José Alencar
- Preceded by: Antônio Aguiar Filho
- Succeeded by: Miguel Kodja Neto
Other Santos FC roles
Presirent of Santos FC's Deliberative Council
In office
1 January 2018 – 31 December 2020
Vice-president of Santos FC
In office
1 January 1990 – 31 December 1991

Personal details
- Born: Marcelo Pirilo Teixeira; 28 April 1964 (age 62) Santos, São Paulo, Brazil
- Spouse: Valéria Simões Teixeira
- Children: 2
- Education: UNIMES
- Profession: Businessman, educator
- Religion: Catholic

Marcelo Pirilo Teixeira (born 28 April 1964) is a Brazilian businessman, and the current president of Santos FC.

== Personal life ==
Born in Santos, São Paulo to Nilza Maria Pirilo Teixeira and Milton Teixeira (a former Santos president), Teixeira is married to Valéria Simões Teixeira, with whom he has two children: Marcelo Teixeira Filho and Caroline Simões Teixeira.

Graduated in business administration at the Universidade Metropolitana de Santos (UNIMES), Teixeira is also the president of the Administration Council of the Universidade Santa Cecília (UNISANTA), and the president of the Sistema Santa Cecília de Comunicação (which includes the Santa Cecília TV and the Santa Cecília FM. He was also decorated with the honours of Cidadão Emérito de Santos, Cidadão Emérito de Guarujá, Cidadão São-Bernardense and Cidadão Guarulhense.

In June 2018, Teixeira published a book entitled Das arquibancadas à presidência 2002 (From the stands to the presidency 2002), an autobiography focused on his period at Santos.

== Santos FC ==
In the 1980s, as his father Milton was president of the club, he became an advisor of Santos FC at the age of 20. In December 1989, he became the vice-president of the club, after Antônio Aguiar Filho was elected president. On 7 January 1992, Teixeira was elected president of the club, becoming the youngest-ever president at the age of 27.

In December 1993, Teixeira announced he would not compete in the club's following elections, being subsequently replaced by Miguel Kodja Neto. He then spent a period away from the club before being elected president on 12 December 1999, defeating the then vice-president José Paulo Fernandes. His first two seasons were landmarked by the signings of high-profile players, such as Freddy Rincón, Marcelinho Carioca, Edmundo, Márcio Santos, Carlos Germano, Valdo and Carlos Galván, but the team was unable to lift any trophies.

Re-elected for another two-year period on 1 December 2001, Teixeira saw Santos under severe financial crisis, and after opting to let go most of the high-profile players, he then signed Emerson Leão as a head coach. With a squad mainly composed of players coming from teams in the countryside and from the youth setup, Santos managed to lift the 2002 Série A and establish himself as a serious contender in the following two seasons.

On 7 December 2003, shortly after changing the club's statutes to allow the current president to run for election without interruption, Teixeira was re-elected president of Santos for the third consecutive time, defeating Luis Álvaro de Oliveira Ribeiro. Another Série A title followed in 2004, but the club subsequently lost proeminence after most of the original squad from 2002 were sold or left.

Still re-elected in 2005 and 2007, both defeating Paulo Schiff, Teixeira saw the club win two consecutive Campeonato Paulista titles in the process. However, after poor performances in the 2008 and 2009 campaigns, he lost the election to Luis Álvaro de Oliveira Ribeiro on 5 December 2009; that year also saw the debuts of Neymar and Paulo Henrique Ganso, two of the key players in the following seasons.

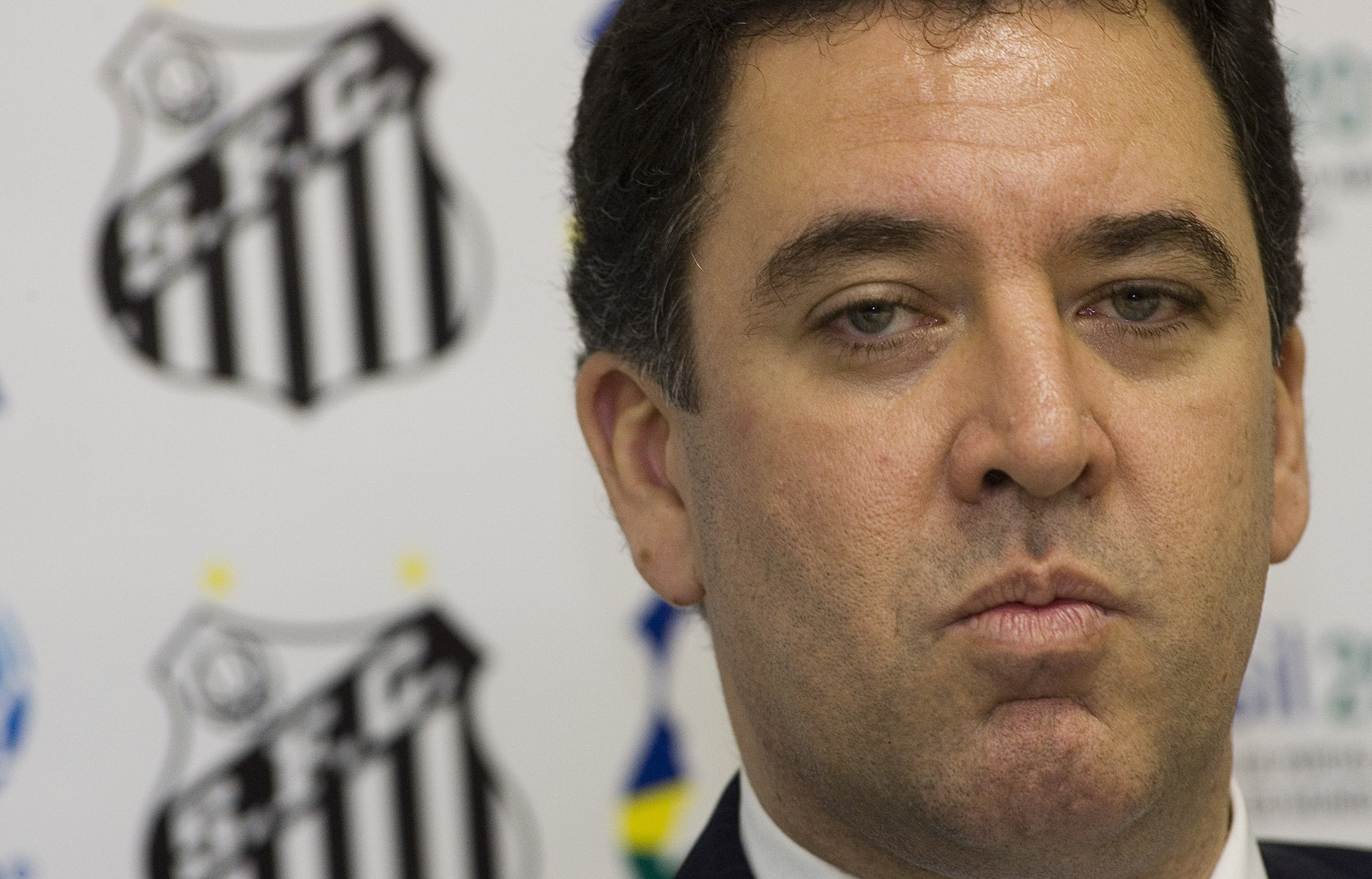
Teixeira in 2015

In May 2010, completely out of the structure of the club, Teixeira went to Court against Santos to recover R$ 15 million, as he was a guarantor of the club during the period he was president. The legal action saw the club having their accounts blocked, had their stadium Vila Belmiro pawned for a period before reaching an agreement with the new board in November 2011.

On 18 December 2017, Teixeira was elected president of Santos' Deliberative Council, returning to the club's political structure after eight years. On 9 December 2023, shortly after the club's first-ever relegation from the top tier, he was elected president for the following three years.
