= Jackson Borges =

Brazilian footballer

Personal information
- Full name: Jackson Borges de Jesus
- Date of birth: 16 September 1987 (age 39)
- Place of birth: Itabuna, Brazil
- Height: 1.78 m (5 ft 10 in)
- Position: Forward

Team information
- Current team: Batatais

Senior career*
| Years | Team | Apps | (Gls) |
| 2008 | Saltense | | |
| 2009 | Atlético Araçatuba | | |
| 2010–2011 | Rio Claro | | |
| 2010 | → Metropolitano (loan) | | |
| 2011 | Ituano | | |
| 2012 | São Carlos | | |
| 2012 | Velo Clube | | |
| 2013 | Corinthians | | |
| 2013 | → Flamengo–SP (loan) | | |
| 2013–2015 | São Caetano | 4 | (0) |
| 2014 | → Matonense (loan) | | |
| 2015 | → Anápolis (loan) | | |
| 2015 | → Uberlândia (loan) | | |
| 2015 | São José | | |
| 2016 | Velo Clube | | |
| 2017– | Batatais | | |
- * Club domestic league appearances and goals as of 28 March 2017

Jackson Borges de Jesus (born 16 September 1987), known as Jackson Borges, Jackson Five or simply Jackson, is a Brazilian footballer who plays for Batatais as a forward

== Career statistics ==
As of 28 March 2017

| Club | Season | League | | | State League | | Cup | | Continental | | Other | | Total | |
| Club | Season | Division | Apps | Goals | Apps | Goals | Apps | Goals | Apps | Goals | Apps | Goals | Apps | Goals |
|---|---|---|---|---|---|---|---|---|---|---|---|---|---|---|
| Rio Claro | 2010 | Paulista | — | | 7 | 3 | — | | — | | — | | 7 | 3 |
| Rio Claro | 2011 | Paulista A2 | — | | 11 | 4 | — | | — | | — | | 11 | 4 |
| Rio Claro | Subtotal | | — | | 18 | 7 | — | | — | | — | | 18 | 7 |
| São Carlos | 2012 | Paulista A2 | — | | 16 | 3 | — | | — | | — | | 16 | 3 |
| Flamengo–SP | 2013 | Paulista A3 | — | | 23 | 20 | — | | — | | — | | 23 | 20 |
| São Caetano | 2013 | Série B | 4 | 0 | — | | — | | — | | 6 (Note: All appearance(s) in Copa Paulista) | 1 | 10 | 1 |
| São Caetano | 2014 | Série C | — | | 3 | 0 | — | | — | | — | | 3 | 0 |
| São Caetano | Subtotal | | 4 | 0 | 3 | 0 | — | | — | | 6 | 1 | 13 | 1 |
| Matonense | 2014 | Paulista A3 | — | | 7 | 0 | — | | — | | — | | 7 | 0 |
| São José | 2015 | Paulista A3 | — | | — | | — | | — | | 2 | 0 | 2 | 0 |
| Velo Clube | 2016 | Paulista A2 | — | | 8 | 2 | — | | — | | — | | 8 | 2 |
| Batatais | 2017 | Paulista A3 | — | | 7 | 0 | — | | — | | — | | 7 | 0 |
| Career total | | | 4 | 0 | 82 | 32 | 0 | 0 | 0 | 0 | 8 | 1 | 94 | 33 |
