= Da Silva (footballer, born 1989) =

Brazilian footballer

Personal information
- Full name: Renildo Martins da Silva
- Date of birth: 20 August 1989 (age 37)
- Place of birth: Tocantinópolis, Brazil
- Height: 1.74 m (5 ft 8 1/2 in)
- Position: Defender

Team information
- Current team: Operário–MS

Senior career*
Years	Team	Apps	(Gls)
2007–2009	Tocantinópolis		
2009	Morrinhos		
2009	→ Goiás (loan)	1	(0)
2010–2011	Itauçu		
2010	→ Goiás (loan)		
2010	→ Guarani (loan)	3	(0)
2011	→ Paulista		
2011	→ Jataiense (loan)		
2012	Morrinhos		
2012	→ CRAC (loan)		
2012	→ Aparecida–GO (loan)		
2013	Cruzeiro–RS		
2013	Bahia de Feira		
2013	Ferroviária		
2014	Guarany de Sobral		
2014	Novo Horizonte		
2015	América–GO		
2015	Caldas		
2016	Sete de Dourados	6	(0)
2017	Operário–MS		
- * Club domestic league appearances and goals as of 29 March 2017

Renildo Martins da Silva (born 20 August 1989), known as Da Silva, is a Brazilian footballer who plays for Operário–MS as defender

== Career statistics ==
As of 29 March 2017

Club	Season	League			State League		Cup		Continental		Other		Total	
Club	Season	Division	Apps	Goals	Apps	Goals	Apps	Goals	Apps	Goals	Apps	Goals	Apps	Goals
Goiás	2009	Série A	1	0	—		—		—		—		1	0
Guarani	2010	Série A	3	0	10	2	5	1	—		—		18	3
Paulista	2011	Paulista	—		—		1	0	—		—		1	0
Morrinhos	2012	Goiano	—		16	0	—		—		—		16	0
Aparecida–GO	2012	Goiano 2ªD	—		1	0	—		—		—		1	0
Bahia de Feira	2013	Baiano	—		10	2	—		—		—		10	2
Ferroviária	2013	Paulista A2	—		—		—		—		9 (Note: All appearance(s) in Copa Paulista)	0	9	0
Guarany de Sobral	2014	Série D	—		1	0	—		—		—		1	0
América–GO	2015	Goiano 2ªD	—		8	0	—		—		—		8	0
Caldas	2015	Goiano 3ªD	—		7	0	—		—		—		7	0
Sete de Dourados	2016	Série D	6	0	6	0	—		—		—		12	0
Operário–MS	2017	Sul-Mato-Grossense	—		—		—		—		1 (Note: All appearance(s) in Copa Verde)	0	1	0
Career total			10	0	59	4	6	1	0	0	10	0	85	5
