= Marcel (footballer, born November 1981) =

Brazilian footballer

Personal information
- Full name: Marcel Augusto Ortolan
- Date of birth: 12 November 1981 (age 44)
- Place of birth: Mirassol, São Paulo, Brazil
- Height: 1.87 m (6 ft 1 1/2 in)
- Position: Striker

Team information
- Current team: Criciúma

Youth career
- 1999: Coritiba

Senior career*
| Years | Team | Apps | (Gls) |
| 2000–2003 | Coritiba | 49 | (20) |
| 2004 | Suwon Bluewings | 23 | (8) |
| 2004–2006 | Académica | 32 | (13) |
| 2006–2011 | Benfica | 7 | (0) |
| 2006 | → Braga (loan) | 10 | (1) |
| 2006–2007 | → São Paulo (loan) | 3 | (0) |
| 2007 | → Grêmio (loan) | 17 | (5) |
| 2008 | → Cruzeiro (loan) | 0 | (0) |
| 2008 | → Grêmio (loan) | 29 | (9) |
| 2009 | → Vissel Kobe (loan) | 10 | (3) |
| 2010 | → Santos (loan) | 13 | (5) |
| 2011 | → Vasco da Gama (loan) | 0 | (0) |
| 2011 | Suwon Bluewings | 11 | (3) |
| 2011–2012 | Coritiba | 12 | (1) |
| 2013 | Mirassol | | |
| 2013– | Criciúma | | |

International career
| 2003 | Brazil U-23 | 8 | (3) |
- * Club domestic league appearances and goals

Marcel Augusto Ortolan (born 12 November 1981 in Mirassol, São Paulo), commonly known as Marcel, is a Brazilian footballer.

== Career ==
Marcel started his career in Brazilian regional league, playing for Coritiba. After brief spell in Suwon Samsung Bluewings, he joined Académica de Coimbra in January 2005, for US$1.8 million transfer fee. The two seasons spent in Académica de Coimbra were probably the highest point, so far, in Marcel's career: he managed to score 13 goals, saving the club from relegation in the second season and catching the eye of Portuguese big teams such as Benfica and Porto.

He was signed on loan from Benfica on 15 January 2006. Benfica signed the player permanently in the summer of 2006, for €2.66 million fee. However, in December, Marcel was loaned to Braga for one year. Upon his return, Marcel was loaned once more, this time around to the Brazilian side São Paulo for another year. Nevertheless, Marcel was unable to establish himself in the team, hence the loan contract was canceled. Marcel was once again loaned, now to Grêmio where he joined his Benfica teammate Diego Souza.

In 2008, he was loaned to Cruzeiro. He played sparsely, failed to make an impact and his loan was terminated on 13 May. He was loaned again to Grêmio.

He played 29 times for the Campeonato Brasileiro 2008 and score nine goals. On 19 December, Marcel was released from Grêmio and Benfica loaned him for another season, this time for the J1 League side Vissel Kobe.

Rumors around his return to Benfica have started to appear around Portuguese sports journals due to his success in Japan and because of the confirmation that the club's coach Jorge Jesus would bring another striker in January to suppress the shortage of pure centre-forward players on the squad.

In September 2011 he returned to Coritiba, subject to bureaucratic clearance.

== Honours ==
=== Club ===
Coritiba

- Campeonato Paranaense: 2003, 2012

Suwon Bluewings

- K-League: 2004

Santos

- Copa do Brasil: 2010

=== Individual ===
- Campeonato Paranaense Top Scorer: 2003
