= Rodriguinho (footballer, born 1983) =

Brazilian footballer

Personal information
- Full name: Rodrigo Batista da Cruz
- Date of birth: February 2, 1983 (age 43)
- Place of birth: Santos, São Paulo, Brazil
- Height: 1.74 m (5 ft 8 1/2 in)
- Position: Striker

Team information
- Current team: Jabaquara

Youth career
- Santos
- Portuguesa Santista

Senior career*
Years	Team	Apps	(Gls)
2005	Portuguesa Santista	12	(0)
2005–2006	Sport	5	(0)
2006	São Caetano	2	(0)
2006	Ituano	24	(7)
2007–2008	SEV	30	(9)
2009	Rio Branco	3	(0)
2009–2010	Santo André	31	(15)
2010–2013	Fluminense	32	(5)
2011	→ Atlético Paranaense (loan)	7	(0)
2012	→ Portuguesa (loan)	19	(2)
2013	→ Avaí (loan)		
2013	Jeju United	3	(0)
2014–	Linense	0	(0)
- * Club domestic league appearances and goals

Rodrigo Batista da Cruz (born 2 February 1983 in Santos, São Paulo), is a Brazilian footballer who currently plays for Linense.

== Career ==
On 6 May 2010 Fluminense Football Club signed the forward from Esporte Clube Santo André on loan until December.
