= 2010 Campeonato Paulista =

Campeonato Paulista - Série A1
- Season: 2010
- Champions: Santos (18th title)
- Relegated: Rio Claro; Monte Azul; Sertãozinho; Rio Branco–SP
- Matches: 202
- Goals: 634 (3.14 per match)
- Top goalscorer: Ricardo Bueno (16)
- Biggest home win: Santos 9–1 Ituano
- Biggest away win: Rio Branco–SP 0–4 Santos; Grêmio Prudente 0–4 Botafogo–SP; Ituano 0–4 Grêmio Prudente; Monte Azul 0–4 Portuguesa
- Highest scoring: Santos 9–1 Ituano (10 goals)

The 2010 Campeonato Paulista de Futebol Profissional da Primeira Divisão - Série A1 was the 109th season of São Paulo's top professional football league.

Santos were crowned champions after a 5–5 tie on aggregate score against Santo André in the finals, which were held at Pacaembu. As they had ended with best campaign in the first stage, they took the trophy.

== Format ==
The top four teams in the first stage qualify for the semi-finals. The bottom four teams are relegated to the Série A2. Semi-finals and finals are played in two-legged matches. The four top ranked teams that did not qualify to the semi-finals and from outside the city of São Paulo or Santos FC, would contest each other in the Campeonato do Interior (Interior Championship).

== Teams ==
Club	Home city	2009 result
Botafogo–SP	Ribeirão Preto	15th
Bragantino	Bragança Paulista	10th
Corinthians	São Paulo (Tatuapé)	1st
Grêmio Prudente	Presidente Prudente	8th
Ituano	Itu	13th
Mirassol	Mirassol	7th
Mogi Mirim	Mogi Mirim	16th
Monte Azul	Monte Azul Paulista	1st (Série A2)
Oeste	Itápolis	14th
Palmeiras	São Paulo (Perdizes)	3rd
Paulista	Jundiaí	12th
Ponte Preta	Campinas	9th
Portuguesa	São Paulo (Pari)	5th
Rio Branco–SP	Americana	2nd (Série A2)
Rio Claro	Rio Claro	3rd (Série A2)
Santo André	Santo André	6th
Santos	Santos	2nd
Sertãozinho	Sertãozinho	4th (Série A2)
São Caetano	São Caetano do Sul	11th
São Paulo	São Paulo (Morumbi)	4th

== First stage ==
=== League table ===
Pos	Team	Pld	W	D	L	GF	GA	GD	Pts	Qualification or relegation
1	Santos	19	15	2	2	61	24	+37	47	Advanced to the Knockout stage
2	Santo André	19	11	4	4	45	27	+18	37	Advanced to the Knockout stage
3	Grêmio Prudente	19	11	4	4	34	28	+6	37	Advanced to the Knockout stage
4	São Paulo	19	11	3	5	41	19	+22	36	Advanced to the Knockout stage
5	Corinthians	19	10	5	4	32	18	+14	35	
6	Portuguesa	19	9	4	6	29	20	+9	31	
7	Botafogo–SP	19	9	4	6	27	25	+2	31	Advanced to the Campeonato do Interior
8	São Caetano	19	8	3	8	30	25	+5	27	Advanced to the Campeonato do Interior
9	Oeste	19	6	8	5	27	26	+1	26	Advanced to the Campeonato do Interior
10	Ponte Preta	19	7	4	8	25	30	−5	25	Advanced to the Campeonato do Interior
11	Palmeiras	19	6	7	6	31	32	−1	25	
12	Mogi Mirim	19	7	3	9	22	35	−13	24	
13	Ituano	19	6	4	9	23	37	−14	22	
14	Mirassol	19	5	7	7	24	27	−3	22	
15	Paulista	19	6	2	11	23	32	−9	20	
16	Bragantino	19	5	5	9	37	42	−5	20	
17	Rio Claro	19	5	4	10	24	34	−10	19	Relegation to Campeonato Paulista Série A2
18	Monte Azul	19	3	6	10	23	41	−18	15	Relegation to Campeonato Paulista Série A2
19	Sertãozinho	19	3	5	11	24	41	−17	14	Relegation to Campeonato Paulista Série A2
20	Rio Branco-SP	19	2	6	11	17	36	−19	12	Relegation to Campeonato Paulista Série A2

Updated to match(es) played on 8 April 2010. Source: UOL Esporte
Rules for classification: 1st points; 2nd wins; 3rd goal difference; 4th goals scored; 5th red cards received; 6th yellow cards received; 7th public draw

=== Results ===
Home \ Away	BOT	BRA	COR	ITU	MIR	MMI	MAZ	OES	PAL	PAU	PPR	POR	PRU	RBR	RCL	SAD	SAN	SER	SCT	SPA
Botafogo–SP				0–0		3–0	2–1	2–1	1–1		1–0						2–4	3–1	1–0	
Bragantino	2–0			3–4			1–1	4–0	2–3			1–1	2–3	4–3					2–3	1–0
Corinthians	1–1	2–1			1–1				1–0	0–1				0–0	5–1	2–1		4–0		4–3
Ituano			0–2		4–0					1–0	1–1		0–4			1–2		1–0	0–1	0–1
Mirassol	1–1	3–0				1–0		1–1				0–1	2–2		1–2		1–2		0–3	1–1
Mogi Mirim		1–1	0–3	3–0				1–3		1–0	1–0			2–2		3–2	2–1			
Monte Azul			1–1	2–2	1–2	5–3			0–1	2–3		0–4			3–2			1–0		
Oeste			1–2	2–0			2–2			2–2		1–2	1–1	3–1				2–1		0–0
Palmeiras				3–3	1–1	5–1		0–0			0–2	1–1				1–3		3–2	1–4	2–0
Paulista	1–0	2–2			0–2				3–1		0–1		1–2	1–0	2–1		2–3			
Ponte Preta		4–3	2–1		1–3		2–1	1–3				2–1			2–2	1–1		2–3		0–2
Portuguesa	1–2		1–1	2–3		0–1				2–1			1–2		3–1		1–1	2–0	1–0	
Prudente	0–4		2–0			3–0	1–0		2–2		3–1			2–0	3–2	1–3			1–0	
Rio Branco–SP	1–0			1–2	2–2		0–0		2–2		1–2	0–2				1–4	0–4			
Rio Claro	1–3	1–3		1–0		0–0		0–1	1–0					3–0		1–1			3–1	
Santo André	4–1	4–1			2–1		3–0	2–2		4–2		2–0					1–2		2–2	1–3
Santos		6–3	2–1	9–1			5–0	2–0	3–4		1–1		5–0		2–1			4–2		
Sertãozinho		1–1			2–1	2–3				3–2			1–1	0–0	1–1	2–3				2–2
São Caetano			0–1			1–0	2–2	2–2		2–0	2–0			1–2			1–3	5–1		
São Paulo	5–0					3–0	5–1			3–0		1–3	3–1	2–1	3–0		1–2		3–0	

Source: Futpédia
Legend: Blue = home team win; Yellow = draw; Red = away team win.

== Knockout stage ==
=== Bracket ===
Semifinals
Santos	3	3	6
São Paulo	2	0	2
Santo André	2	1	3
Grêmio Prudente	1	2	3

Finals
Santos	3	2	5
Santo André	2	3	5

=== Semi-finals ===
Team 1	Agg.	Team 2	1st leg	2nd leg
Santos	6–2	São Paulo	3–2	3–0
Santo André	3–3	Grêmio Prudente	2–1	1–2

=== Finals ===
Team 1	Agg.	Team 2	1st leg	2nd leg
Santos	5–5	Santo André	3–2	2–3

- Santos were crowned champions due to the best campaign in the first stage.

== Campeonato do Interior ==
=== Bracket ===
Semifinals
Botafogo–SP	0	2	2
Ponte Preta	0	2	2
São Caetano	0	3	3
Oeste	1	1	2

Finals
Botafogo–SP	0	1	1
São Caetano	1	0	1

=== Semi-finals ===
Team 1	Agg.	Team 2	1st leg	2nd leg
Botafogo–SP	2–2	Ponte Preta	0–0	2–2
São Caetano	3–2	Oeste	0–1	3–1

=== Finals ===
Team 1	Agg.	Team 2	1st leg	2nd leg
Botafogo–SP	1–1	São Caetano	0–1	1–0

- Botafogo–SP were crowned champions due to the best campaign in the first stage.

== Statistics ==
=== Top goalscorers ===
Rank	Name	Club	Goals
1	(Brazil) Ricardo Bueno	Oeste	16
2	(Brazil) Rodriguinho	Santo André	15
3	(Brazil) Neymar	Santos	14
4	(Brazil) André	Santos	13
5	(Brazil) Héverton	Portuguesa	11
5	(Brazil) Ganso	Santos	11
6	(Brazil) Robert	Palmeiras	10
6	(Brazil) Eduardo	São Caetano	10

Source: UOL Esporte

=== Hat-tricks ===
Player	For	Against	Result	Date
(Brazil) Rodriguinho	Santo André	Paulista	4–2	24 January 2010
(Brazil) Ricardo Bueno	Oeste	Mogi Mirim	3–1	13 February 2010
(Brazil) Fernandinho^{1}	São Paulo	Monte Azul	5–1	28 February 2010
(Brazil) Geovane	Mogi Mirim	Ituano	3–0	13 March 2010
(Brazil) Robert	Palmeiras	Santos	4–3	14 March 2010
(Brazil) André	Santos	Ituano	9–1	21 March 2010
(Brazil) Araújo	Grêmio Prudente	Mogi Mirm	3–0	25 March 2010
(Brazil) Borebi	Monte Azul	Mogi Mirim	5–3	4 April 2010

- ^{1} Fernandinho scored 4 goals.

== Awards ==
=== Team of the year ===
Pos.	Player	Club
GK	(Brazil) Júlio César	Santo André
DF	(Brazil) Wesley	Santos
DF	(Brazil) Edu Dracena	Santos
DF	(Brazil) Miranda	São Paulo
DF	(Brazil) Roberto Carlos	Corinthians
MF	(Brazil) Marcos Assunção	Grêmio Prudente
MF	(Brazil) Arouca	Santos
MF	(Brazil) Ganso	Santos
FW	(Brazil) Neymar	Santos
FW	(Brazil) Rodriguinho	Santo André
FW	(Brazil) Robinho	Santos

Source: Globo Esporte

=== Player of the Season ===
The Player of the Season was awarded to Neymar.

=== Coach of the Season ===
The Coach of the Season award went to Dorival Júnior.

=== Top scorer of the Season ===
The Top scorer award went to Ricardo Bueno, who scored 16 goals.

=== Young Player of the Season ===
The Young Player of the Season was awarded to Bruno César.

=== Countryside Best Player of the Season ===
The Countryside Best Player of the Season was awarded to Rodriguinho.

=== Best Goalkeeper of the Season ===
The Best Goalkeeper of the Season was awarded to Felipe, who conceded 14 goals in 12 matches.
