= Estádio Urbano Caldeira =

Football stadium in Brazil

- Vila Belmiro
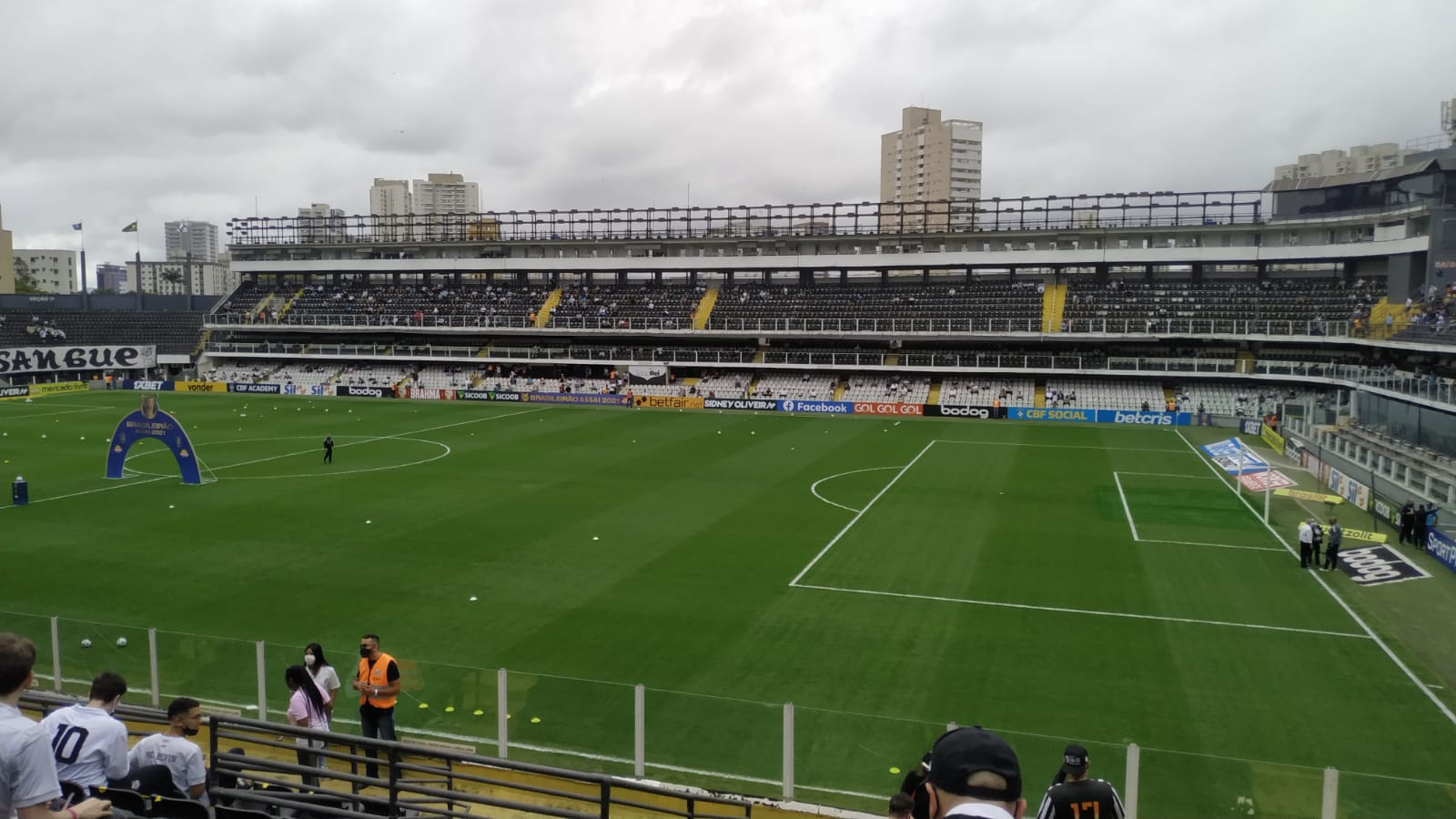
- Sisbrace
- Interactive map of Estádio Urbano Caldeira
- Full name: Estádio Urbano Caldeira
- Former names: Estádio do Santos (1916–1933)
- Location: Rua Princesa Isabel, Vila Belmiro neighborhood, Santos, Brazil
- Coordinates: 23°57′4″S 46°20′20″W
- Owner: Santos FC
- Operator: Santos FC
- Capacity: 16,068; 17,872 (international)
- Surface: Natural grass
- Scoreboard: Yes
- Record attendance: 31,662 (Santos vs Palmeiras, 15 February 1976)
- Field size: 105 by 68 metres (114.8 yd × 74.4 yd))

Construction
- Groundbreaking: 1916
- Opened: 12 October 1916
- Renovated: 27 March 1997
- Expanded: 27 March 1997

Tenant
- Santos (1916–present)

The Estádio Urbano Caldeira (Portuguese pronunciation: [isˈtad͡ʒju uʁˈbɐnu kawˈdejɾɐ]; lit. 'Urbano Caldeira Stadium', named after Urbano Caldeira), most known as Vila Belmiro (Portuguese pronunciation: [isˈtad͡ʒju du ˈvilɐ bewˈmiɾu]; lit. 'Vila Belmiro Stadium', named after the Vila Belmiro neighborhood), is an association football stadium in Santos, Brazil. Located in the Vila Belmiro neighborhood, it is home of Santos.

The stadium was inaugurated on 12 October 1916, when Santos FC beat Clube Atlético Ypiranga 2–1, with Adolpho Millon Jr. scoring the first goal of the stadium. However, the team sometimes uses the Pacaembu Stadium located in the city of São Paulo for important games due to the low capacity of Vila Belmiro.

The stadium underwent several expansions and renovations in the 1990s and 2000s (decade), most notably the renewal of the irrigation and drainage systems, flood-lighting and the replacement of the field. The stadium's current highest attendance was recorded in 1964, when 32,989 spectators watched the Campeonato Paulista match between Santos and Corinthians.

The funeral of Pelé was held at this stadium on January 2 and 3, 2023.

== Location ==
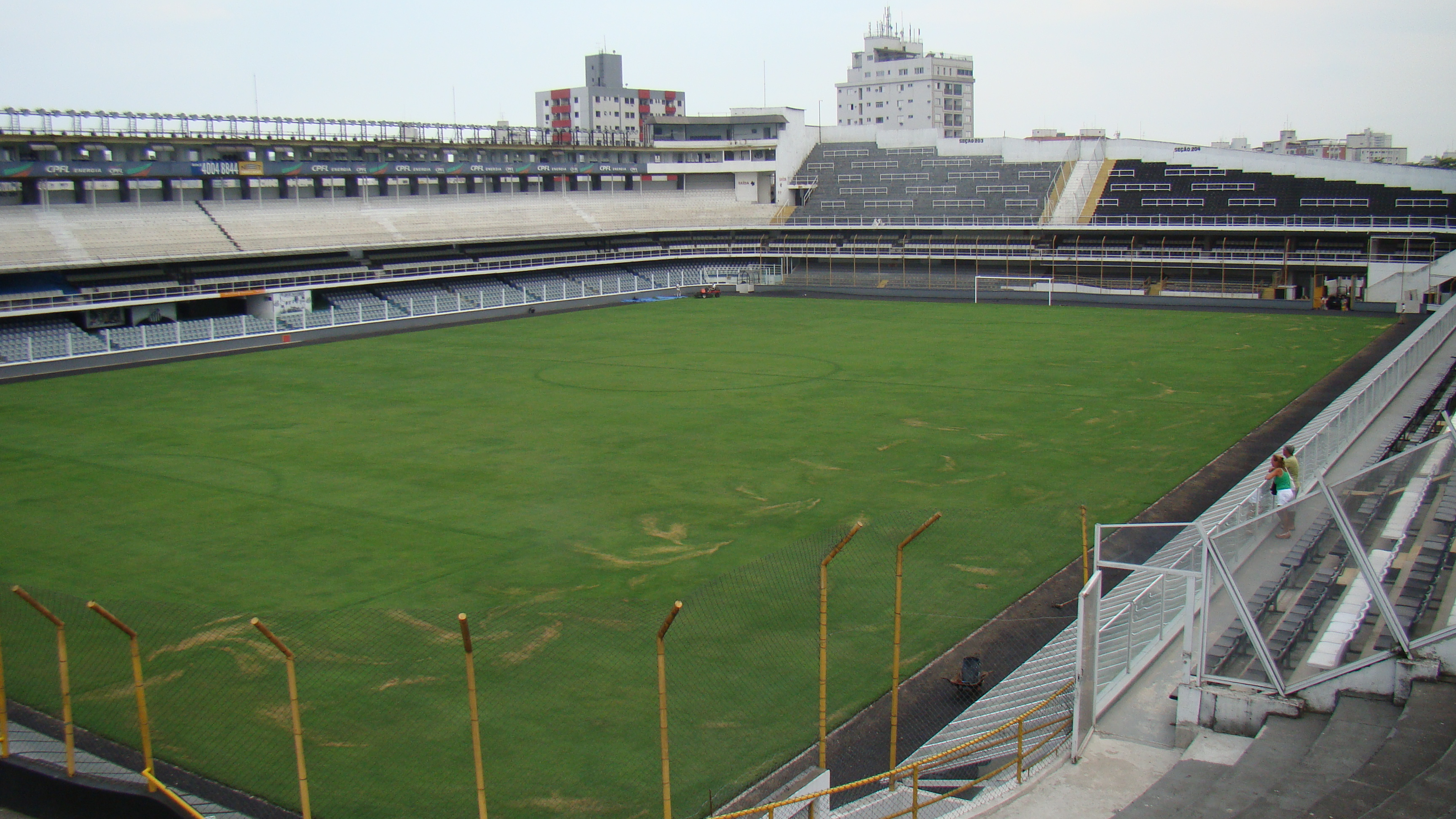
Internal view of the stadium, 2009

The Estádio Urbano Caldeira is located on the Princesa Isabel street, in the neighborhood of Vila Belmiro, occupying the block bounded by the streets of Tiradentes, Don Pedro I, and José de Alencar. The venue is 600 feet (182.88 meters) in between the avenues of Senator Pinheiro Machado and Dr. Bernadino de Campos.

== History ==
...Santos currently can afford to proudly say that it maintains a sports center that rivals any one in the state (of São Paulo)...

— Mário Bezerra da Silva, a club member, during Santos' 1981st game in 1981.

Soon after its foundation, Santos held their training in a field located in the neighborhood of Macuco. As the field did not meet the minimum size standards to host official matches, Santos played on the "Igreja Coração de Maria" pitch in Ana Costa Avenue. The field, however, was also used by other clubs in town. In 1915, the situation reached its breaking point, when Santos had constant conflicts with other city clubs on when the field could be used, forcing the club to reject several requests for international friendlies. To solve the problem, the leaders began searching for land in the city, with a commission formed by Luiz Suplicy Júnior, Harold Cross, Sebastião Arantes Nogueira and Francisco Viriato Corrêa da Costa. On 31 May 1916, a general assembly approved the purchase of an area of 16,500 square meters, in the neighborhood of Vila Belmiro, approved by club president Agnello Cícero de Oliveira and vice-president Dr. Álvaro Ribeiro. The land acquired belonged to Companhia de Habitações Econômicas, and the field was bought from them at a price of Rs$66,660,000. The board members obtained a 10-year loan which was liquified in 1923 after paying Rs$35,000,000 in interest fees.

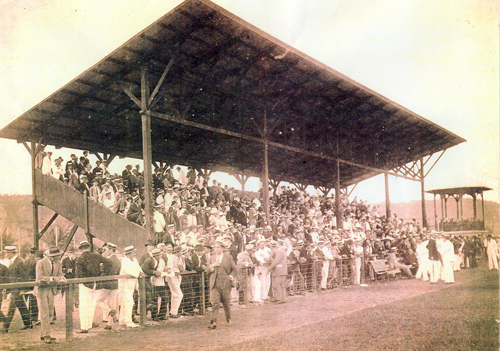
The stadium during its inauguration in 1916

The club, however, did not obtain a nearby area belonging to Beneficência Portuguesa, since the club's finances did not favor this. It would not be acquired until 1989. The original date for the inauguration of the field was 20 August; it was postponed until further notice due to the death of Dr. Álvaro Ribeiro. On October 12 of that year, the inauguration of the Vila Belmiro sports park was celebrated with several ceremonies among the members, including a march by musical corporation Humanitária, to see off playing on Macuco field. The first game was held 10 days later at 13:30 (UTC-3), against Ypiranga for the 1916 Campeonato Paulista, the competition's 491st match, which Santos won 2–1. Ticket prices were set at Rs$2 for bleacher and Rs$1 for the general public. Adolpho Million Jr. scored the first ever goal on that stadium with Jarbas scoring the second, while Bororó scored for the visiting team. Santos was formed by: Odorico; Américo and Arantes; Pereira, Oscar and Junqueira; Millon, Marba, Tedesco, Jarbas and Arnaldo. Ypiranga was represented by Dionísio; Dario and Ferreira; Loschiavo, Jacintho and Peres II; Ary, Hugo, Bororó, Peres I and Formiga. Demosthenes de Silos was the referee for the match.

=== Early years ===
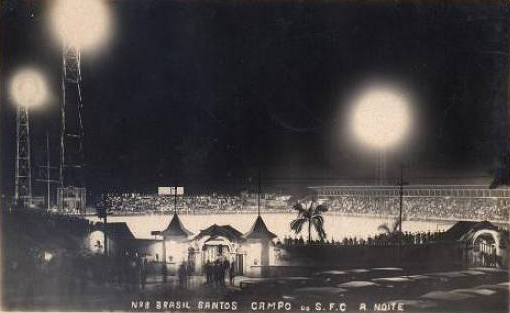
Santos' first match during the night took place on 21 March 1931

The first major renovation occurred in 1931. On 21 March, of that year, the stadium renovated its stands and an illumination system was installed. Twenty hours later, the club's first late match was played against a combined team from the city of Santos, with the club losing to its city counterpart 0–1. Manoel Cruz, a midfielder from Portuguesa Santista, scored the only goal of the match.

After Urbano Caldeira died on 12 March 1933, Ricardo Pinto de Oliveira, one of the club board members at that time, wanted to pay homage to Caldeira by naming the stadium after him. After a meeting which included all club members, the naming of the stadium was given a positive vote. Twenty-two years later, the first concrete stand was built where the current electrical score–keeping screen is located at. Called A Vila Mais Famosa do Mundo (The World's Most Famous Village), the Estádio Urbano Caldeira also came to be called after the era of Os Santásticos (1956–1973) the "Alçapão da Vila (The Village Trap) because opposing team often left the ground defeated. Due to the proximity of the stands with the field where the matches unfolds, the pressure that the fans have on opposing teams was said to be incredible. After the golden age, the Vila Belmiro became synonymous with Joga Bonito.

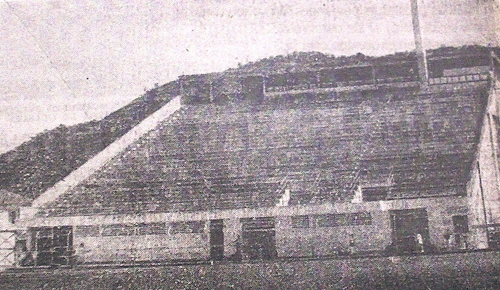
The first concrete stand was built in 1955.

In that stadium of modest dimensions, stars of past and present such Pelé, Coutinho, Pepe, Giovanni, Pitta, Robinho, Diego, Neymar and Paulo Henrique Ganso became figures for the national team. For many years Vila Belmiro was the place where Pelé demonstrated his skills. On 21 November 1964, at Vila Belmiro, Pelé scored eight goals against Botafogo (SP), when Santos beat the opposing squad 11–0. On 2 October 1974, Pelé played his farewell game at the stadium. In that match, Santos beat Ponte Preta 2–0.

The stadium's attendance record currently stands at 32,989, set on 20 September 1964 when Santos and Corinthians drew 0–0. However, the record was overshadowed by a tragic event, as part of the stadium bleachers collapsed, resulting in injury to 181 spectators. The match was abandoned and rescheduled 10 days later, in the Pacaembu.

=== Development ===
During the 1996 Campeonato Paulista, the stadium was closed because the field was in a poor condition. During this time Santos FC played in many stadiums, including the Estádio Bruno José Daniel in Santo André and the Pacaembu Stadium in São Paulo. After that, the stadium was modified to adopt a system of drainage and irrigation systems controlled by computer. On 20 July 1997, Santos inaugurated the new stadium bleachers, located behind the goal net where, today, the visiting fans are located at. On 27 January 1998, during a game between Santos FC and Delia Tavano, a new illumination system was used, with level of 1,200 lux, more than the FIFA minimum recommendation.

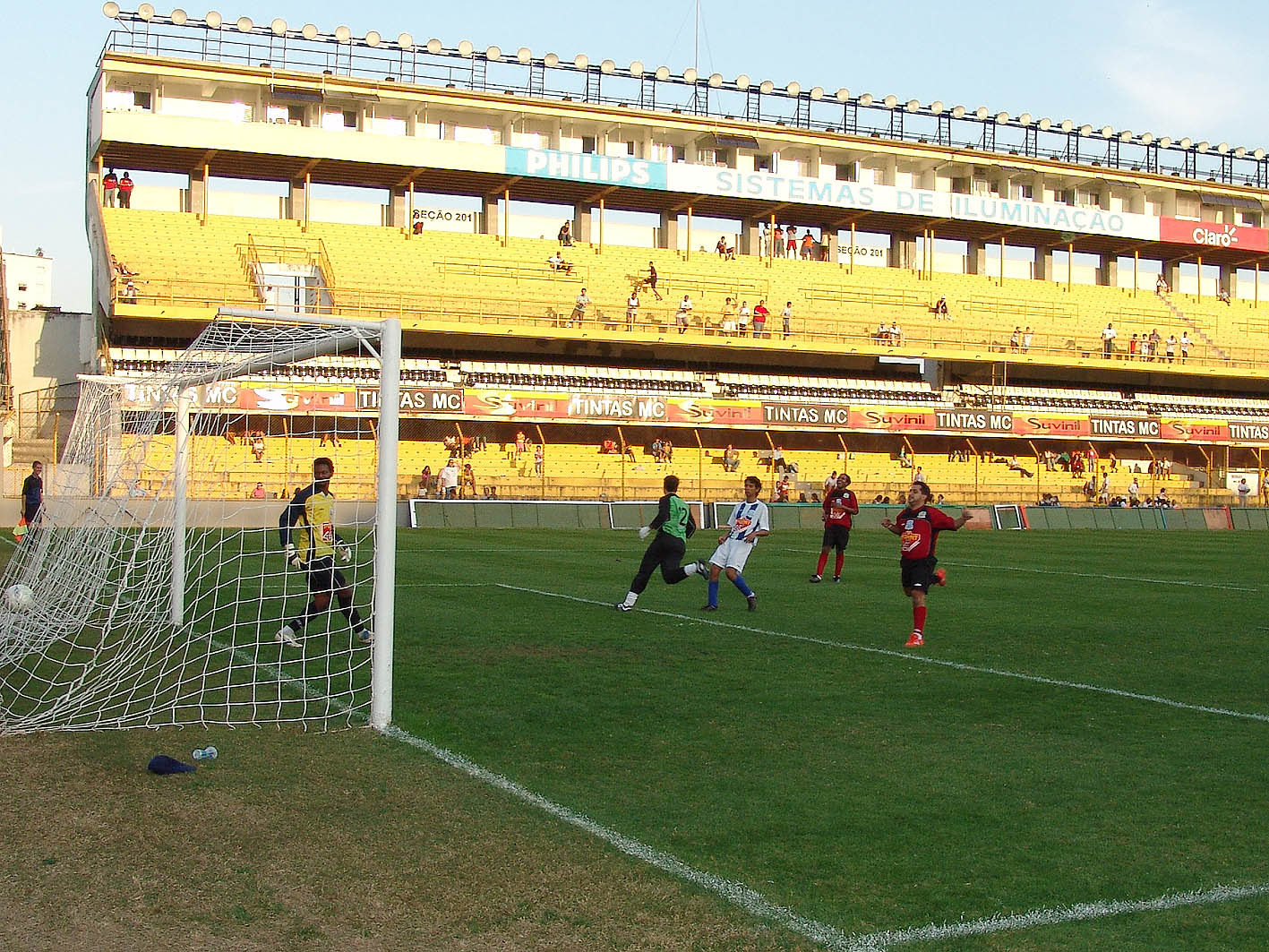
Estádio Urbano Caldeira hosted a charity match in 2003.

On 17 November 2003, Santos FC opened the Memorial das Conquistas, a place inside the stadium as the club memorial, containing trophies, medals, documents, shirts, posters, movies and many other items that recount the club's history. Visitors can also enter the team clock room, press room and the pitch, and, at the end of a tour, can buy club products in a club store inside the stadium. In 2009, the new electronic scoreboard was purchased, twice the size of the previous panel, and provides the score of the game, shows materials, promotions and news of Santos. In addition, the stadium has acquired new seats. More than five thousand seats were installed to better serve members of the club. The seats have been approved by FIFA and were imported from Europe.

The Vila Belmiro was one of the venues of the 1949 Copa América, hosted the 1962 Copa Libertadores final and the 1998 Copa CONMEBOL final. It has also hosted a Copa do Brasil final in 2010. Due to its relative-low capacity, Santos has used other stadiums for high-profile matches such as the Estádio Palestra Itália, Pacaembu and Morumbi, all located in São Paulo, and the Maracanã in Rio de Janeiro. Current Santos President Luís Álvaro Ribeiro and other club directors are agreeing on building a stadium in a city nearby Santos called Cubatão, a stadium for 40,000 people which would become Santos' home field for almost 70% of the games during the season which would increase the team's profits.

== Memorial das Conquistas ==
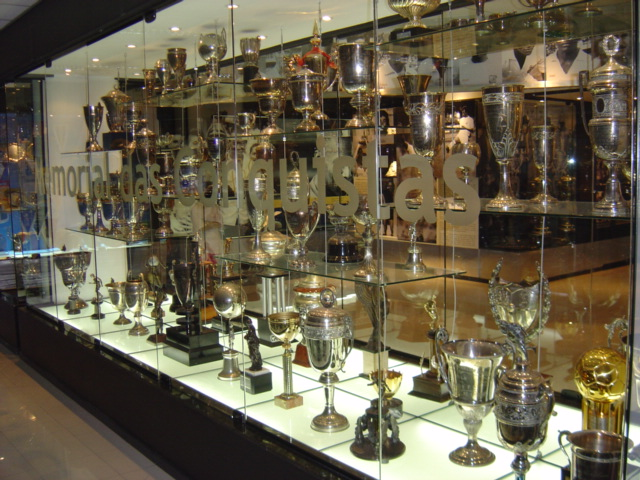
Several trophies won by Santos FC at the Memorial das Conquistas

Santos built a space to receive visitors and tourists interested in knowing the history and achievements of the club in 2003. Named the Memorial das Conquistas, it is one of the main attractions of the Estádio Urbano Caldeira, inaugurated by Pelé, Cabralzinho and Marcelo Texeira. The museum's collection is distributed over an area of 380 square meters. In addition to trophies, there are life-size photos, banners, documents, uniforms, balls, and other multimedia objects. Visitors are greeted by bilingual guides, available to answer queries regarding the club's history and exhibits at the museum.

The material is divided into thematic areas. Beyond Espaço Pelé (personal collection with pieces from O Rei), there is the location of state and national titles, information about the city, Santos and the World, among others. The museum also innovates by presenting various multimedia equipment such as TV sets, which allow viewing of historical plays. The CineGol is a site, which reproduces a piece of football field in a projection room that lets you view movies and special clips about the club. Since its inauguration, it has received over 300,000 visitors.

== 1949 South American Championship ==
One match of the 1949 South American Championship was played at the Estádio Urbano Caldeira:

April 27, 1949

Peru	3–0	Bolivia
R. Drago 31', 74'; Heredia 77' (pen.)

Vila Belmiro, Santos
Attendance: 12,000
Referee: Alberto Da Gama Malcher (BRA)

== See also ==
- List of football stadiums in Brazil
- CT Rei Pelé
- CT Meninos da Vila
- Arena Santos
- Lists of stadiums

Preceded by Estadio Centenario, Montevideo; Pacaembu, São Paulo	Copa Libertadores; Second leg Final Venue; 1962; Estadio Centenario, Montevideo (First leg); El Monumental, Buenos Aires (Third leg)	Succeeded by Maracanã, Rio de Janeiro; La Bombonera, Buenos Aires
Preceded by Estadio Ciudad de Lanús, Lanús; Mineirão, Belo Horizonte	Copa CONMEBOL; First leg Final Venue; 1998; Estadio Gigante de Arroyito, Rosario (Second leg)	Succeeded by Estádio Rei Pelé, Maceió; Estadio Chateau Carreras, Córdoba
