= 2007 Santos FC season =

Santos
2007 season
- Santos vs Goiás at the Vila Belmiro on 27 October
- President: Marcelo Teixeira
- Coach: Vanderlei Luxemburgo
- Stadium: Vila Belmiro
- Campeonato Brasileiro: 2nd
- Campeonato Paulista: Winners
- Copa Libertadores: Semi-finals
- Top goalscorer: League: Kléber Pereira (16); All: Marcos Aurélio (17)
- Highest home attendance: 58,953 vs São Caetano (6 May)
- Lowest home attendance: 2,784 vs Atlético Paranaense (30 August)

The 2007 season was Santos Futebol Clube's ninety-fifth season in existence and the club's forty-eighth consecutive season in the top flight of Brazilian football. Santos won the Campeonato Paulista for the second consecutive year and the 18th in history. Santos' Copa Libertadores campaign was very well, exiting in the semi-finals with a defeat on aggregate score against Grêmio. Santos ended the Campeonato Brasileiro in the 2nd position, 13 points behind leaders São Paulo.

== Players ==
=== Squad information ===
Note: Flags indicate national team as defined under FIFA eligibility rules; some limited exceptions apply. Players may hold more than one non-FIFA nationality.

No.	Pos.	Nation	Player
—	GK	BRA	Fábio Costa
—	GK	BRA	Felipe
—	DF	BRA	Adaílton
—	DF	BRA	Antônio Carlos
—	DF	BRA	Domingos
—	DF	BRA	Leonardo
—	DF	BRA	Marcelo
—	DF	BRA	Carlinhos
—	DF	BRA	Kléber
—	DF	BRA	Thiago Carleto
—	DF	BRA	Alessandro
—	DF	BRA	Baiano
—	MF	BRA	Pedrinho
—	MF	BRA	Rodrigo Tabata

No.	Pos.	Nation	Player
—	MF	SRB	Petković
—	FW	BRA	Wesley
—	MF	BRA	Rodrigo Souto
—	MF	CHI	Maldonado
—	MF	BRA	Díonísio
—	MF	BRA	Adriano
—	MF	BRA	Hudson
—	MF	BRA	Adoniran
—	MF	BRA	Vitor Júnior
—	FW	BRA	Marcos Aurélio
—	FW	BRA	Moraes
—	FW	BRA	Kléber Pereira
—	MF	BRA	Renatinho

=== Appearances and goals ===
				Total			Campeonato Brasileiro		Campeonato Paulista		Copa Libertadores	
No.	Pos.	Nat.	Name	Sts	App	Gls	App	Gls	App	Gls	App	Gls
	GK	(Brazil)	Fábio Costa	67	67		31		22		14	
	GK	(Brazil)	Felipe	2	2		2					
	DF	(Brazil)	Adaílton	55	55	3	25	1	17	1	13	1
	DF	(Brazil)	Alessandro	21	27	1	23	1			4	
	DF	(Brazil)	Antônio Carlos	21	22	1	1		14	1	7	
	DF	(Brazil)	Baiano	11	11		11					
	DF	(Brazil)	Carlinhos	19	26	3	17		8	2	1	1
	DF	(Brazil)	Dênis	14	15				9		6	
	DF	(Brazil)	Domingos	37	37	2	31	1	4	1	2	
	DF	(Brazil)	Kléber	55	55	5	26	3	16	1	13	1
	DF	(Brazil)	Leonardo	7	9		1		7		1	
	DF	(Brazil)	Marcelo	33	39	3	25	2	7	1	7	
	DF	(Brazil)	Thiago Carleto	1	2		1		1			
	MF	(Brazil)	Adoniran	5	8		8					
	MF	(Brazil)	Adriano	24	30		24		6			
	MF	(Brazil)	Dionísio	16	22		17		3		2	
	MF	(Chile)	Maldonado	43	43	1	14		17		12	1
	MF	(Brazil)	Pedrinho	37	61	12	31	10	18	1	12	1
	MF	(Serbia)	Petkovic	14	21	1	21	1				
	MF	(Brazil)	Rodrigo Souto	59	64	3	33	2	18		13	1
	MF	(Brazil)	Rodrigo Tabata	33	68	12	37	7	20	4	11	1
	FW	(Brazil)	Kléber Pereira	25	26	16	26	16				
	FW	(Brazil)	Marcos Aurélio	51	63	17	33	7	16	6	14	4
	FW	(Brazil)	Moraes	6	21	3	15	1	4	2	2	
	FW	(Brazil)	Renatinho	9	28	6	23	3	3	1	2	2
	FW	(Brazil)	Vítor Júnior	5	24	1	24	1				
	FW	(Brazil)	Wesley	2	4		4					
Players who left the club during the season
	GK	(Brazil)	Roger	6	6		5		1			
	DF	(Brazil)	Ávalos	14	20	1	2		9	1	9	
	DF	(Brazil)	Neto	2	3		1		2			
	DF	(Brazil)	Pedro	16	18	3			13	2	5	1
	DF	(Brazil)	Vinícius	3	3		2		1			
	MF	(Brazil)	Cléber Santana	36	40	15	6	1	20	11	14	3
	MF	(Brazil)	Júnior		2				2			
	MF	(Brazil)	Zé Roberto	29	34	10	1		19	3	14	7
	FW	(Brazil)	Fabiano	6	8	2			7	2	1	
	FW	(Brazil)	Jonas	18	33	5	5		20	4	8	1
	FW	(Brazil)	Rodrigo Tiuí	15	22	6			15	3	7	3

Last updated: 2 December 2007
Source: Match reports in competitive matches
Ordered by Starting XI, game starts and position on pitch (from back right to front left)
0 shown as blank

=== Top scorers ===
R	Name	P	Brasileirão	Paulistão	Libertadores	Total
1	(Brazil) Marcos Aurélio	FW	7	6	4	17
2	(Brazil) Kleber Pereira	FW	16	0	0	16
3	(Brazil) Cléber Santana	MF	1	11	3	15
4	(Brazil) Rodrigo Tabata	MF	7	4	1	12
4	(Brazil) Pedrinho	MF	10	1	1	12
5	(Brazil) Zé Roberto	MF	0	3	7	10

=== Disciplinary record ===
Nat.	Pos.	Name	Brasileirão		Libertadores		Paulistão		Total	
Nat.	Pos.	Name	Booked	Sent off (straight red)	Booked	Sent off (straight red)	Booked	Sent off (straight red)	Booked	Sent off (straight red)
(Brazil)	GK	Fábio Costa	1		2		3		6	
(Brazil)	GK	Roger	1						1	
(Brazil)	DF	Adaílton	6	3	2	1	9		17	4
(Brazil)	DF	Antônio Carlos			2		1		3	
(Brazil)	DF	Ávalos			1		1		2	
(Brazil)	DF	Domingos	11		1		1		13	
(Brazil)	DF	Leonardo	1				1		2	
(Brazil)	DF	Marcelo	4		2		2		8	
(Brazil)	DF	Alessandro	4						4	
(Brazil)	DF	Baiano	2	1					2	1
(Brazil)	DF	Dênis			1		1		2	
(Brazil)	DF	Neto					1		1	
(Brazil)	DF	Pedro			5		5		10	
(Brazil)	DF	Carlinhos	4				1		5	
(Brazil)	DF	Kléber	6				5		11	
(Brazil)	MF	Adriano	7				3		10	
(Brazil)	MF	Cléber Santana	1		1		3		4	
(Brazil)	MF	Dionísio	6		1	1	1		8	1
(Brazil)	MF	Pedrinho	6		1		3		10	
(Serbia)	MF	Petkovic	2						2	
(Brazil)	MF	Rodrigo Tabata	5		1		3		9	
(Brazil)	MF	Rodrigo Souto	6		3		7		16	
(Brazil)	MF	Vinícius	1						1	
(Brazil)	MF	Vítor Júnior	2						2	
(Brazil)	MF	Zé Roberto			2		8		10	
(Brazil)	FW	Jonas			1		3		4	
(Brazil)	FW	Kléber Pereira	3						3	
(Brazil)	FW	Marcos Aurélio	2		1				3	
(Brazil)	FW	Moraes					1		1	
(Brazil)	FW	Renatinho	1						1	
(Brazil)	FW	Rodrigo Tiuí			2		4		6	
(Brazil)	FW	Wesley	1						1	

=== Copa Libertadores squad ===
Note: Flags indicate national team as defined under FIFA eligibility rules; some limited exceptions apply. Players may hold more than one non-FIFA nationality.

No.	Pos.	Nation	Player
1	GK	BRA	Fábio Costa
2	DF	BRA	Adaílton
3	DF	BRA	Kléber
4	DF	BRA	Pedro
5	MF	BRA	Rodrigo Souto
6	DF	BRA	Antônio Carlos
7	FW	BRA	Jonas
8	FW	CHI	Maldonado
9	FW	BRA	Fabiano
10	MF	BRA	Zé Roberto
11	MF	BRA	Cléber Santana
12	GK	BRA	Roger
13	DF	BRA	Ávalos

No.	Pos.	Nation	Player
14	DF	BRA	Domingos
15	DF	BRA	Dênis
16	DF	BRA	Carlinhos
17	FW	BRA	Marcos Aurélio
18	MF	BRA	Pedrinho
19	DF	BRA	Marcelo
20	MF	BRA	Rodrigo Tabata
21	MF	BRA	Júnior
22	MF	BRA	Renatinho
23	DF	BRA	Adriano
24	GK	BRA	Felipe
25	MF	BRA	Díonísio

== Transfers ==
=== In ===
Pos.	Player	Age	Moving from	Type	Source
MF	(Serbia) Petkovic	35	Goiás	Signed	UOL Esporte
DF	(Brazil) Alessandro	28	Dinamo Kyiv (Ukraine)	Signed	Globo Esporte
DF	(Brazil) Antônio Carlos	37	Juventude	Signed	Folha
DF	(Brazil) Baiano	29	Rubin Kazan (Russia)	Loaned	Estadao
MF	(Brazil) Pedrinho	29	Fluminense	Signed	UOL Esporte
MF	(Brazil) Rodrigo Souto	23	Atlético Paranaense	Signed	UOL Esporte
DF	(Brazil) Adaílton	23	Rennes (France)	Signed	UOL Esporte
FW	(Brazil) Marcos Aurélio	22	Bragantino	Signed	Parana Online
DF	(Brazil) Pedro	25	Iraty	Loaned	SantosFC.com.br
DF	(Brazil) Vinícius	23	Iraty	Loaned	SantosFC.com.br
DF	(Brazil) Leonardo	20	Shakhtar Donetsk (Ukraine)	Loaned	Shakhtar.com
DF	(Brazil) Neto	27	Fluminense	Loan return	
FW	(Brazil) Vítor Júnior	21	Sport	Signed	Estadao
MF	(Brazil) Adoniran	21	Ituano	Signed	Folha
FW	(Brazil) Kléber Pereira	32	Club América (Mexico)	Signed	UOL Esporte

=== Out ===
Pos.	Player	Age	Moving to	Source
MF	(Brazil) André Oliveira	22	Free Agent	
FW	(Brazil) Leandro Rodrigues	25	Free Agent	
DF	(Brazil) Jardel	20	Free Agent	
FW	(Brazil) Reinaldo	28	Kashiwa Reysol (Japan)	
GK	(Brazil) Saulo	22	Free Agent	
GK	(Brazil) Roger	35	Botafogo	
FW	(Brazil) Wellington Paulista	23	Alavés (Spain)	
DF	(Paraguay) Manzur	26	Free Agent	
DF	(Brazil) Luiz Alberto	30	Fluminense	
DF	(Brazil) Ronaldo Guiaro	33	Aris (Greece)	
FW	(Brazil) Rodrigo Tiuí	22	Fluminense	
DF	(Brazil) Ávalos	30	São Caetano	
MF	(Brazil) Vinícius	24	Iraty	
DF	(Brazil) Pedro	26	Free Agent	
FW	(Brazil) Jonas	23	Grêmio	
MF	(Brazil) Heleno	29	Sport	
MF	(Brazil) André Luiz	33	Chiapas (Mexico)	
DF	(Brazil) Paulo	20	Tigres do Brasil	
DF	(Brazil) Neto	26	Aris (Greece)	
MF	(Brazil) Cléber Santana	26	Atlético Madrid (Spain)	
MF	(Brazil) Zé Roberto	33	Bayern München (Germany)	

=== Out on loan ===
P	Name	Age	Moving to	Source
DF	(Brazil) Paulo	20	Santa Cruz	SantosFC.com.br
FW	(Brazil) Luciano Henrique	27	Sport	SantosFC.com.br
FW	(Brazil) Geílson	22	Al Hazm (Saudi Arabia)	Folha
FW	(Brazil) Luciano Henrique	27	Internacional	Globo Esporte
FW	(Brazil) Júnior	20	Itumbiara	Terra Esporte
FW	(Brazil) Vinicius Simon	20	Itumbiara	Terra Esporte
FW	(Brazil) Geílson	22	Atlético–PR	O Globo
FW	(Brazil) Fabiano	23	Sport	Globo Esporte

== Competitions ==
=== Overall summary ===
Competition	Started round	Final position / round	First match	Last match
Campeonato Brasileiro	—	2nd	13 May	2 December
Campeonato Paulista	First stage	Winner	17 January	6 May
Copa Libertadores	Group stage	Semi-finals	22 February	6 June

Updated to match played 2 December 2007
Source: Competitions

=== Detailed overall summary ===
	Total	Home	Away
Games played	75	38	37
Games won	47	27	20
Games drawn	11	6	5
Games lost	17	5	12
Biggest win	5–0 v Blooming	5–0 v Blooming	4–1 v América-RN; 4–1 v Noroeste
Biggest loss	0–4 v Vasco da Gama	2–4 v Fluminense	0–4 v Vasco da Gama
Clean sheets	27	17	10
Goals scored	132	79	53
Goals conceded	77	31	46
Goal difference	+55	+48	+7
Average GF per game	1.76	2.07	1.43
Average GC per game	1.02	0.81	1.24
Yellow cards	182	79	103
Red cards	6	2	4
Most appearances	Rodrigo Tabata (68)	Fábio Costa (33)	Rodrigo Tabata (36)
Top scorer	Marcos Aurélio (17)	Marcos Aurélio (11)	Rodrigo Tabata (9)
Worst discipline	Adaílton (yellow card) (18) (red card) (4)	Adaílton (yellow card) (9) (red card) (1)	Adaílton (yellow card) (9) (red card) (3)
Points	152/225 (67.55%)	87/114 (76.31%)	65/111 (58.55%)
Winning rate	62.66%	71.05%	54.05%

=== Campeonato Brasileiro ===
==== League table ====
Pos	Team	Pld	W	D	L	GF	GA	GD	Pts	Qualification or relegation
1	São Paulo	38	23	8	7	55	19	+36	77	Qualified for both Copa Libertadores 2008 and Copa Sudamericana 2008
2	Santos	38	19	5	14	57	47	+10	62	Qualified for the Copa Libertadores 2008
3	Flamengo	38	17	10	11	55	49	+6	61	Qualified for the Copa Libertadores 2008
4	Fluminense	38	16	13	9	57	39	+18	61	Qualified for the Copa Libertadores 2008 by winning the Copa do Brasil 2007
5	Cruzeiro	38	18	6	14	73	59	+14	60	Qualified for the Copa Libertadores 2008

==== Results summary ====
Overall								Home						Away					
Pld	W	D	L	GF	GA	GD	Pts	W	D	L	GF	GA	GD	W	D	L	GF	GA	GD
38	19	5	14	57	47	+10	62	11	4	4	36	19	+17	8	1	10	21	28	−7

Last updated: 2 December 2007.
Source: Competitive matches

==== Results by round ====
Round	1	2	3	4	5	6	7	8	9	10	11	12	13	14	15	16	17	18	19	20	21	22	23	24	25	26	27	28	29	30	31	32	33	34	35	36	37	38
Ground	A	H	A	H	A	A	H	H	A	H	H	A	H	A	H	A	H	H	A	H	A	H	A	H	H	A	A	H	A	A	H	A	H	A	H	A	A	H
Result	L	L	W	D	L	W	L	D	L	W	W	D	W	L	L	W	W	W	L	W	W	W	L	W	W	L	L	W	W	W	D	L	W	W	D	L	W	L
Position	19	19	17	16	19	14	17	17	17	17	13	17	12	14	15	14	10	7	9	7	6	5	5	3	3	3	6	4	3	3	3	4	2	2	2	2	2	2

Updated to match(es) played on 2 December 2007. Source: Futpédia
A = Away; H = Home; W = Win; D = Draw; L = Loss

==== Matches ====
13 May 1	Sport	4–1	Santos	Recife
	Weldon 10'; Fumagalli 36'; Durval 40'; Washington 90+1'	Report	2' Pedrinho	Stadium: Ilha do Retiro; Attendance: 24,736

19 May 2	Santos	2–3	América–RN	Santos
	Marcelo 2'; Marcos Aurélio 67'	Report	42', 47', 54' Edson Borges	Stadium: Vila Belmiro; Attendance: 3,093

27 May 3	Atlético–PR	0–1	Santos	Curitiba
		Report	16' Rodrigo Tabata	Stadium: Arena da Baixada; Attendance: 11,368

3 June 4	Santos	1–1	Corinthians	Santos
	Marcelo 77'	Report	22' Zelão	Stadium: Vila Belmiro; Attendance: 10,736

10 June 5	Internacional	1–0	Santos	Porto Alegre
	Alexandre Pato 41'	Report		Stadium: Beira Rio; Attendance: 3,220

17 June 6	Juventude	0–2	Santos	Caxias do Sul
		Report	1' Cléber Santana; 31' Marcos Aurélio	Stadium: Alfredo Jaconi; Attendance: 4,207

24 June 7	Santos	0–2	São Paulo	Santos
		Report	20' Aloísio; 40' Dagoberto	Stadium: Vila Belmiro; Attendance: 8,703

30 June 8	Santos	0–0	Grêmio	Santos
		Report		Stadium: Vila Belmiro; Attendance: 3,597

4 July 9	Vasco	4–0	Santos	Rio de Janeiro
	Conca 21', 25'; Wagner Diniz 81'; Ernane 86'	Report		Stadium: São Januário; Attendance: 2,379

7 July 10	Santos	4–1	Cruzeiro	Santos
	Marcos Aurélio 7'; Rodrigo Tabata 31'; Pedrinho 45', 67'	Report	8' Fernandinho	Stadium: Vila Belmiro; Attendance: 3,414

14 July 11	Santos	3–0	Botafogo	Santos
	Marcos Aurélio 60'; Rodrigo Tabata 64'; Moraes 90'	Report		Stadium: Vila Belmiro; Attendance: 12,554

19 July 12	Palmeiras	2–2	Santos	São Paulo
	Nen 18'; Rodrigo Souto 90+2' (o.g.)	Report	10' Kléber; 45+1' Pedrinho	Stadium: Parque Antártica; Attendance: 18,662

22 July 13	Santos	3–1	Figueirense	Santos
	Kléber Pereira 33', 38'; Pedrinho 84'	Report	55' Victor Simões	Stadium: Vila Belmiro; Attendance: 4,984

25 July 14	Goiás	1–0	Santos	Goiânia
	Welliton 61'	Report		Stadium: Serra Dourada; Attendance: 7,498

28 July 15	Santos	1–2	Náutico	Santos
	Kléber Pereira 87'	Report	39' Elicarlos; 65' Acosta	Stadium: Vila Belmiro; Attendance: 8,321

1 August 16	Atlético Mineiro	1–2	Santos	Belo Horizonte
	Danilinho 71'	Report	33' Marcos Aurélio; 59' Kléber Pereira	Stadium: Mineirão; Attendance: 22,038

5 August 17	Santos	3–0	Flamengo	Santos
	Pedrinho 21'; Marcos Aurélio 32'; Kléber 50'	Report		Stadium: Vila Belmiro; Attendance: 6,835

9 August 18	Santos	2–0	Paraná Clube	Santos
	Marcos Aurélio 43'; Kléber Pereira 90+2'	Report		Stadium: Vila Belmiro; Attendance: 5,602

12 August 19	Fluminense	3–0	Santos	Rio de Janeiro
	Luiz Alberto 36'; Thiago Neves 64', 71'	Report		Stadium: Maracanã; Attendance: 6,002

18 August 20	Santos	2–0	Sport	Santos
	Kléber Pereira 25'; Pedrinho 54'	Report		Stadium: Vila Belmiro; Attendance: 10,446

26 August 21	América–RN	1–4	Santos	Natal
	Ney Santos 83'	Report	20' Petkovic; 25', 46' Kleber Pereira; 85' Rodrigo Tabata	Stadium: Machadão; Attendance: 5,043

30 August 22	Santos	3–1	Atlético–PR	Santos
	Domingos 29'; Pedrinho 53'; Kléber Pereira 76' (pen.)	Report	11' Antonio Carlos	Stadium: Vila Belmiro; Attendance: 2,784

2 September 23	Corinthians	2–0	Santos	São Paulo
	Nílton 9'; Arce 52'	Report		Stadium: Pacaembu; Attendance: 10,438

5 September 24	Santos	2–1	Internacional	Santos
	Kléber Pereira 27'; Kléber 34'	Report	11' Adriano	Stadium: Vila Belmiro; Attendance: 3,233

8 September 25	Santos	1–0	Juventude	Santos
	Renatinho 84'	Report		Stadium: Vila Belmiro; Attendance: 16,105

15 September 26	São Paulo	2–1	Santos	São Paulo
	Breno 49'; Borges 53'	Report	90+2' Rodrigo Tabata	Stadium: Morumbi; Attendance: 33,865

22 September 27	Grêmio	1–0	Santos	Porto Alegre
	Marcel 55'	Report		Stadium: Olímpico; Attendance: 20,917

30 September 28	Santos	1–0	Vasco	Santos
	Rodrigo Souto 22'	Report		Stadium: Vila Belmiro; Attendance: 9,158

3 October 29	Cruzeiro	0–1	Santos	Belo Horizonte
		Report	90+4' Adaílton	Stadium: Mineirão; Attendance: 8,110

6 October 30	Botafogo	1–2	Santos	Rio de Janeiro
	Dodô 66'	Report	51' Rodrigo Tabata; 89' Renatinho	Stadium: Engenhão; Attendance: 7,918

13 October 31	Santos	1–1	Palmeiras	Santos
	Renatinho 58'	Report	30' Caio	Stadium: Vila Belmiro; Attendance: 15,978

21 October 32	Figueirense	1–0	Santos	Florianópolis
	Kléber 45' (o.g.)	Report		Stadium: Orlando Scarpelli; Attendance: 9,517

27 October 33	Santos	3–0	Goiás	Santos
	Pedrinho 47'; Rodrigo Tabata 74'; Vitor Júnior 76'	Report		Stadium: Vila Belmiro; Attendance: 13,058

31 October 34	Náutico	1–2	Santos	Recife
	Felipe 15'	Report	45' Kléber Pereira; 86' Pedrinho	Stadium: Aflitos; Attendance: 15,252

4 November 35	Santos	2–2	Atlético Mineiro	Santos
	Kléber Pereira 51' (pen.), 76'	Report	8' (o.g.) Marcelo; 78' Eduardo	Stadium: Vila Belmiro; Attendance: 7,063

11 November 36	Flamengo	1–0	Santos	Rio de Janeiro
	Souza 75'	Report		Stadium: Maracanã; Attendance: 81,844

25 November 37	Paraná Clube	2–3	Santos	Curitiba
	Jumar 30'; Paulo Rodrigues 70'	Report	61', 76', 83' Kléber Pereira	Stadium: Vila Capanema; Attendance: 15,406

2 December 38	Santos	2–4	Fluminense	Santos
	Rodrigo Souto 31'; Alessandro 62'	Report	32' Adriano Magrão; 40' Luiz Alberto; 47' Thiago Neves; 70' Arouca	Stadium: Vila Belmiro; Attendance: 14,387

=== Campeonato Paulista ===
==== Results summary ====
Overall								Home						Away					
Pld	W	D	L	GF	GA	GD	Pts	W	D	L	GF	GA	GD	W	D	L	GF	GA	GD
23	17	4	2	47	21	+26	55	9	2	1	23	8	+15	8	2	1	24	13	+11

Last updated: 6 May 2007.
Source: Competitive matches

==== First stage ====
===== League table =====
Pos	Team	Pld	W	D	L	GF	GA	GD	Pts	Qualification or relegation
1	Santos	19	16	2	1	45	19	+26	50	Advanced to the Semi-finals
2	São Paulo	19	13	5	1	41	14	+27	44	Advanced to the Semi-finals
3	São Caetano	19	11	3	5	32	22	+10	36	Advanced to the Semi-finals
4	Bragantino	19	10	5	4	35	17	+18	35	Advanced to the Semi-finals
5	Palmeiras	19	10	5	4	39	25	+14	35	

Updated to match(es) played on 11 April 2007. Source: UOL Esporte
Rules for classification: 1st points; 2nd goal difference; 3rd number of goals scored

===== Matches =====
17 January 1	Grêmio Barueri	1–2	Santos	São Paulo
21:45 UTC-02:00	Marcos Dias 35'	Report	25' Zé Roberto; 88' Antônio Carlos	Stadium: Parque Antarctica; Attendance: 9,469; Referee: Antonio Rogério Batista do Prado

20 January 2	Santos	3–0	São Caetano	Santos
18:10 UTC-02:00	Pedro 18'; Fabiano 22'; Cléber Santana 63'	Report		Stadium: Vila Belmiro; Attendance: 10,037; Referee: Wilson Seneme

22 January 5	Santos	4–1	Sertãozinho	Santos
20:00 UTC-02:00	Jonas 20'; Fabiano 45'; Cléber Santana 57' (pen.), 68'	Report	23' Paulo Santos	Stadium: Vila Belmiro; Attendance: 8,157; Referee: Christian Lopes de Oliveira

25 January 3	Bragantino	2–3	Santos	Bragança Paulista
20:30 UTC-02:00	Alex Afonso 36'; Zelão 73'	Report	14', 36' (pen.) Cléber Santana; 65' Rodrigo Tiuí	Stadium: Marcelo Stéfani; Attendance: 4,051; Referee: Phillipe Lombard

28 January 4	Santos	1–0	Guaratinguetá	Santos
18:10 UTC-02:00	Zé Roberto 75'	Report		Stadium: Vila Belmiro; Attendance: 7,404; Referee: Rodrigo Cintra

4 February 6	Palmeiras	3–3	Santos	São Paulo
18:10 UTC-02:00	Osmar 27', 38'; Edmundo 24' (pen.)	Report	9' Pedrinho; 77' Kléber; 78' Jonas	Stadium: Parque Antarctica; Attendance: 18,676; Referee: Wilson Seneme

11 February 8	Santo André	1–2	Santos	Santo André
18:10 UTC-02:00	Léo Costa 41'	Report	25', 53' (pen.) Cléber Santana	Stadium: Bruno José Daniel; Attendance: 6,382; Referee: Wilson Seneme

14 February 7	Santos	4–1	América–SP	Santos
20:30 UTC-02:00	Cléber Santana 34'; Pedro 50'; Marcos Aurélio 73', 83'	Report	47' (pen.) Márcio Barros	Stadium: Vila Belmiro; Attendance: 6,283; Referee: Anselmo da Costa

17 February 9	Santos	0–2	São Bento	Santos
18:10 UTC-02:00		Report	88' Roberto Santos; 90+2' Sérgio Júnior	Stadium: Vila Belmiro; Attendance: 9,721; Referee: Claudinei Forati Silva

25 February 10	Marília	0–1	Santos	Marília
18:10 UTC-02:00		Report	88' Ávalos	Stadium: Bento de Abreu; Attendance: 10,404; Referee: Eduardo César Coronado Coelho

4 March 11	Santos	2–1	Paulista	Santos
18:10 UTC-03:00	Marcos Aurélio 38'; Rodrigo Tiuí 61'	Report	53' Victor Santana	Stadium: Vila Belmiro; Attendance: 5,948; Referee: Luiz Flávio de Oliveira

8 March 12	Rio Branco–SP	0–3	Santos	Americana
20:30 UTC-03:00		Report	45' (pen.) Cléber Santana; 67', 82' Rodrigo Tabata	Stadium: Décio Vitta; Referee: Rodrigo Amaral

11 March 13	Santos	1–1	São Paulo	Santos
16:00 UTC-03:00	Carlinhos 90+1'	Report	30' Ilsinho	Stadium: Vila Belmiro; Attendance: 16,811; Referee: Antônio Rogério Batista do Prado

18 March 14	Ituano	1–2	Santos	Itu
16:00 UTC-03:00	Márcio Goiano 16'	Report	40' Carlinhos; 61' Marcos Aurélio	Stadium: Novelli Júnior; Attendance: 4,799; Referee: Philippe Lombard

25 March 15	Santos	2–1	Rio Claro	São Paulo
18:10 UTC-03:00	Marcos Aurélio 11'; Rodrigo Tiuí 59'	Report	50' Wagnão	Stadium: Parque Antarctica; Attendance: 13,853; Referee: Anselmo da Costa

28 March 16	Santos	2–1	Corinthians	Santos
21:45 UTC-03:00	Zé Roberto 10'; Jonas 80'	Report	22' (o.g.) Adaílton	Stadium: Vila Belmiro; Attendance: 14,110; Referee: José Henrique de Carvalho

1 April 17	Ponte Preta	2–4	Santos	Campinas
18:10 UTC-03:00	Gabriel 40'; Finazzi 66'	Report	12' Rodrigo Tabata; 59' Marcelo; 80' (pen.) Cléber Santana; 87' Moraes	Stadium: Moisés Lucarelli; Attendance: 8,992; Referee: Milton Etsuo Bellerini

8 April 18	Noroeste	1–4	Santos	Bauru
16:00 UTC-03:00	Edno 62'	Report	6' (pen.) Cléber Santana; 78' Rodrigo Tabata; 82' Marcos Aurélio; 88' Jonas	Stadium: Alfredo de Castilho; Attendance: 3,107; Referee: Claudinei Forati Silva

11 April 19	Santos	2–0	Juventus	São José dos Campos
21:45 UTC-03:00	Domingos 31'; Renatinho 66'	Report		Stadium: Martins Pereira; Attendance: 9,360; Referee: Roger Arias da Cunha

==== Knockout stage ====
===== Semi-finals =====
14 April 1st Leg	Bragantino	0–0	Santos	São Paulo
16:00 UTC-03:00		Report		Stadium: Pacaembu; Attendance: 27,895; Referee: Sálvio Spínola

22 April 2nd Leg	Santos	0–0 (0–0 agg.)	Bragantino	São Paulo
18:10 UTC-03:00		Report		Stadium: Morumbi; Attendance: 35,145; Referee: Wilson Seneme

===== Finals =====
29 April 1st Leg	São Caetano	2–0	Santos	São Paulo
16:00 UTC-03:00	Luiz Henrique 8'; Somalia 81' (pen.)	Report		Stadium: Morumbi; Attendance: 32,136; Referee: Paulo César de Oliveira

6 May 2nd Leg	Santos	2–0 (2–2 agg.)	São Caetano	São Paulo
16:00 UTC-03:00	Adaílton 24'; Moraes 81'	Report		Stadium: Morumbi; Attendance: 58,953; Referee: José Henrique de Carvalho

=== Copa Libertadores ===
==== First stage ====
31 January 1st Leg	Blooming (Bolivia)	0–1	(Brazil) Santos	Santa Cruz de la Sierra, Bolivia
		Report	Pedro 48'	Stadium: Ramón Tahuichi Aguilera

7 February 2nd Leg	Santos (Brazil)	5–0 (6–0 agg.)	(Bolivia) Blooming	Santos, Brazil
	Cléber Santana 2' (pen.), 29' (pen.); Rodrigo Tiuí 37', 83'; Marcos Aurélio 76'	Report		Stadium: Vila Belmiro

==== Group stage ====
Pos	Team	Pld	W	D	L	GF	GA	GD	Pts
1	(Brazil) Santos (A)	6	6	0	0	12	1	+11	18
2	(Uruguay) Defensor Sporting (A)	6	3	0	3	8	7	+1	9
3	(Argentina) Gimnasia y Esgrima	6	3	0	3	9	10	−1	9
4	(Colombia) Deportivo Pasto	6	0	0	6	3	14	−11	0

Source: RSSSF
(A) Advanced to the round of 16

21 February 1	Deportivo Pasto (Colombia)	0–1	(Brazil) Santos	Pasto, Colombia
		Report	61' Maldonado	Stadium: Libertad

1 March 2	Santos (Brazil)	1–0	(Uruguay) Defensor	Santos, Brazil
	Zé Roberto 48'	Report		Stadium: Vila Belmiro

14 March 3	Santos (Brazil)	3–0	(Argentina) Gimnasia La Plata	Santos, Brazil
	Marcos Aurélio 6'; Cléber Santana 53'; Zé Roberto 48'	Report		Stadium: Vila Belmiro

22 March 4	Gimnasia La Plata (Argentina)	1–2	(Brazil) Santos	La Plata, Argentina
	Leal 89'	Report	2' Marcos Aurélio; 90' Zé Roberto	Stadium: Ciudad de La Plata

5 April 5	Defensor (Uruguay)	0–2	(Brazil) Santos	Montevideo, Uruguay
		Report	68' Marcos Aurélio; 84' Rodrigo Tabata	Stadium: Centenario

19 April 6	Santos (Brazil)	3–0	(Colombia) Deportivo Pasto	Santos, Brazil
	Carlinhos 7'; Pedrinho 45'; Rodrigo Tiuí 87'	Report		Stadium: Vila Belmiro

==== Knockout stage ====
===== Round of 16 =====
2 May 1st Leg	Caracas (Venezuela)	2–2	(Brazil) Santos	Caracas, Venezuela
	Velásquez 55'; Vielma 85'	Report	15' Zé Roberto; 64' Kléber	Stadium: Olímpico

10 May 2nd Leg	Santos (Brazil)	3–2 (5–4 agg.)	(Venezuela) Caracas	Santos, Brazil
	Adaílton 34'; Zé Roberto 40', 66'	Report	23' Rey; 30' Carpintero	Stadium: Vila Belmiro

===== Quarter-finals =====
16 May 1st Leg	América (Mexico)	0–0	(Brazil) Santos	Mexico City, Mexico
		Report		Stadium: Azteca

23 May 2nd Leg	Santos (Brazil)	2–1 (2–1 agg.)	(Mexico) América	Santos, Brazil
	Jonas 65'; Rodrigo Souto 71'	Report	32' Bilos	Stadium: Vila Belmiro

===== Semi-finals =====
30 May 1st Leg	Grêmio (Brazil)	2–0	(Brazil) Santos	Porto Alegre, Brazil
	Tcheco 34' (pen.); Carlos Eduardo 36'	Report		Stadium: Olímpico

6 June 2nd Leg	Santos (Brazil)	3–1 (3–3 agg.)	(Brazil) Grêmio	Santos, Brazil
	Renatinho 45', 61'; Zé Roberto 76'	Report	34' Diego Souza	Stadium: Vila Belmiro
