= Thiago Carleto =

Brazilian footballer

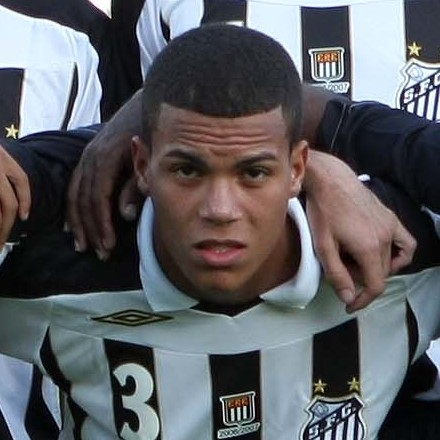
- Carleto with Santos in 2008

Personal information
- Full name: Thiago Carleto Alves
- Date of birth: 24 March 1989 (age 37)
- Place of birth: São Bernardo do Campo, Brazil
- Height: 1.77 m (5 ft 10 in)
- Position: Left back

Youth career
- 2000–2007: Santos

Senior career*
Years	Team	Apps	(Gls)
2007–2008	Santos	12	(0)
2008–2010	Valencia	1	(0)
2009–2010	→ Elche (loan)	6	(2)
2010–2016	São Paulo	5	(1)
2011	→ Olimpia (loan)	3	(0)
2011	→ América Mineiro (loan)	15	(2)
2012	→ Fluminense (loan)	19	(4)
2014	→ Ponte Preta (loan)	4	(1)
2015	→ Botafogo (loan)	43	(4)
2016	→ XV de Piracicaba (loan)	8	(0)
2016	Arouca	5	(1)
2017	Linense	9	(1)
2017	Coritiba	21	(2)
2018	Atlético Paranaense	19	(3)
2018	Al-Ittihad	5	(0)
2019	Ceará	12	(2)
2019–2020	Vitória	41	(9)
2021	Vila Nova	3	(0)
2022	Juventus		
- * Club domestic league appearances and goals as of 3 July 2021

Thiago Carleto Alves (born 24 March 1989), known as Thiago Carleto or simply Carleto, is a Brazilian former footballer who played as a left back.

== Club career ==
=== Santos ===
Born in São Bernardo do Campo, Carleto joined Santos' youth setup in 2000, aged ten. On 11 April 2007, he made his first team debut by coming on as a substitute for fellow youth graduate Dionísio in a 2–0 Campeonato Paulista home win against Juventus-SP.

Back to the under-20s for the remainder of the year, Carleto only featured in one further match for the main squad: a 1–1 Série A home draw against Palmeiras on 13 October 2007. The following 25 January, after impressing in the year's Copa São Paulo de Futebol Júnior, he was definitely promoted to the main squad.

Carleto was a regular starter during the 2008 Paulistão, overcoming longtime incumbent Kléber.

=== Valencia ===
On 26 November 2008, Carleto agreed to a five-and-a-half-year contract with La Liga side Valencia CF. He only made his debut abroad the following 14 February, replacing injured Emiliano Moretti in a 1–1 La Liga home draw against Málaga CF.

On 20 August 2009, Carleto was loaned to Segunda División side Elche CF for the season. He scored his first professional goal on 13 September, netting his team's first in a 2–2 draw at UD Salamanca.

=== São Paulo and loans ===
On 18 February 2010, Carleto returned to his home country after agreeing to a four-year contract with São Paulo. He made his debut for the club on 14 March, in a 2–1 defeat of Rio Branco, for the year's Paulistão.

After struggling with injuries during his first year, Carleto was loaned to Paraguayan Primera División side Olimpia for the 2011 season. After four months with unpaid wages, he terminated his link and joined América Mineiro on 6 May 2011, also in a temporary deal.

Carleto scored his first goal in the Brazilian top tier on 22 October 2011, netting the opener in a 2–2 home draw against Grêmio, and finished the season with two goals in 15 appearances, as his side suffered relegation. The following 11 January, he agreed to a one-year loan deal at Fluminense. A backup to Carlinhos, he appeared rarely as Flu was crowned champions.

Returning to Tricolor ahead of the 2013 campaign, Carleto overcame Bruno Cortez and Reinaldo, becoming a regular starter until suffering a knee injury in June. Upon returning, he served subsequent loans at Ponte Preta (where he had his deal terminated due to indiscipline problems), Avaí, Botafogo and XV de Piracicaba.

=== Arouca / Linense ===
On 10 August 2016, Portuguese side FC Arouca signed Carleto on a two-year deal. On 31 October, after only four matches, he rescinded his contract by alleging "personal problems".

On 22 December 2016, Carleto joined Linense, being a regular starter as his side reached the quarterfinals and qualified to the Série D.

=== Coritiba ===
On 15 May 2017, Carleto returned to the top tier after agreeing to a one-year contract with Coritiba. Initially a backup to William Matheus, he became an undisputed starter for Coxa during the year, being praised for his performances and winning the Bola de Prata despite his club suffering relegation.

=== Atlético Paranaense / Al-Ittihad ===
On 10 January 2018, Coritiba's fierce rivals Atlético Paranaense announced the signing of Carleto on a two-year deal. Initially a first-choice, he lost the status after the upswing of youth graduate Renan Lodi.

On 18 July 2018, Carleto moved to Saudi club Al-Ittihad, for a rumoured fee of € 1 million. The following 14 January, he terminated his contract.

=== Ceará / Vitória ===
On 16 February 2019, Carleto joined Ceará on a one-year deal. On 1 October, he signed a short-term contract with Vitória, after cutting ties with Ceará.

=== Retirement ===
After a brief spell at Clube Atlético Juventus in 2022, he announced his retirement in April 2023.

== Career statistics ==
As of 2 January 2020

Club	Season	League			State League		Cup		Continental		Other		Total	
Club	Season	Division	Apps	Goals	Apps	Goals	Apps	Goals	Apps	Goals	Apps	Goals	Apps	Goals
Santos	2007	Série A	1	0	1	0	—		—		—		2	0
Santos	2007	Série A	9	0	10	0	—		2 (Note: Appearance(s) in Copa Libertadores)	0	—		21	0
Santos	Subtotal		10	0	11	0	—		2	0	—		23	0
Valencia	2008–09	La Liga	1	0	—		0	0	0	0	—		1	0
Elche (loan)	2009–10	Segunda División	6	2	—		1	0	—		—		7	2
São Paulo	2010	Série A	2	0	1	0	—		0	0	—		3	0
São Paulo	2011	Série A	0	0	0	0	0	0	—		—		0	0
São Paulo	2013	Série A	3	1	12	0	—		4	0	—		19	1
São Paulo	Subtotal		5	1	13	0	0	0	4	0	—		22	1
Olimpia (loan)	2011	Primera División	3	0	—		—		—		—		3	0
América Mineiro (loan)	2011	Série A	15	2	—		—		—		—		15	2
Fluminense (loan)	2012	Série A	8	1	8	2	—		3	1	—		19	4
Ponte Preta (loan)	2014	Série B	0	0	3	0	1	1	—		—		4	1
Avaí (loan)	2014	Série B	10	1	—		—		—		—		10	1
Botafogo (loan)	2015	Série B	23	2	18	2	2	0	—		—		43	4
XV de Piracicaba (loan)	2016	Paulista	—		8	0	—		—		—		8	0
Arouca	2016–17	Primeira Liga	2	0	—		0	0	1 (Note: Appearance(s) in UEFA Europa League)	0	1 (Note: Appearance(s) in Taça da Liga)	0	4	0
Linense	2017	Série D	0	0	9	1	—		—		—		9	1
Coritiba	2017	Série A	21	2	—		—		—		—		21	2
Atlético Paranaense	2018	Série A	12	2	—		7	1	—		—		19	3
Al-Ittihad	2018–19	Saudi Professional League	4	0	—		0	0	—		1 (Note: Appearance(s) in Saudi Super Cup)	0	5	0
Ceará	2019	Série A	5	0	4	1	1	0	—		2 (Note: Appearance(s) in Copa do Nordeste)	1	12	2
Vitória	2019	Série B	11	3	—		—		—		—		11	3
Career total			136	16	74	6	12	2	10	1	4	1	236	26

== Honours ==
=== Club ===
Fluminense

- Campeonato Brasileiro Série A: 2012
- Campeonato Carioca: 2012

Botafogo

- Campeonato Brasileiro Série B: 2015
- Taça Guanabara: 2015

=== Individual ===
- Bola de Prata: 2017
