= 2010 São Paulo FC season =

São Paulo
2010 season
- Chairman: Juvenal Juvêncio
- Manager: Ricardo Gomes (until 6 August); Milton Cruz (caretaker manager); Sergio Baresi (caretaker manager); Paulo César Carpegiani
- Série A: 9th
- Campeonato Paulista: Semi-finals
- Copa Libertadores: Semi-finals
- Top goalscorer: League: Fernandão (8 goals); All: Dagoberto (15 goals)
- Highest home attendance: 57,113 ( v Internacional in the Copa Libertadores)
- Lowest home attendance: 4,362 ( v Monte Azul in the Campeonato Paulista)
- Average home league attendance: 14,695
Home colours	Away colours

The 2010 football season was São Paulo's 81st season since club's existence. In this year Tricolor take part on its seventh consecutive Copa Libertadores however was defeated at semifinals by Internacional, that would be champion later, on away goal rule due a goal scored by opponent on Morumbi, 0–1 (away); 2–1 (home). The club came third in Campeonato Paulista losing at semifinals to rival Santos. In Série A ended in ninth position reaching a qualifying to Copa Sudamericana breaking the sequence of qualification to the Copa Libertadores, since 2004.

== Current squad ==
Updated 21 July 2010 Note: Flags indicate national team as defined under FIFA eligibility rules; some limited exceptions apply. Players may hold more than one non-FIFA nationality.

No.	Pos.	Nation	Player
01	GK	BRA	Rogério Ceni (captain)
2	MF	BRA	Jean
3	DF	BRA	Alex Silva (on loan from Hamburg)
5	DF	BRA	Miranda
6	DF	BRA	Júnior César
7	MF	BRA	Jorge Wagner
8	MF	BRA	Cléber Santana
12	FW	BRA	Fernandinho
13	DF	BRA	Xandão
14	DF	BRA	Renato Silva
15	FW	BRA	Fernandão
16	MF	BRA	Marlos
18	MF	BRA	Rodrigo Souto

No.	Pos.	Nation	Player
20	MF	BRA	Richarlyson
21	MF	BRA	Sergio Mota
22	GK	BRA	Bosco
25	FW	BRA	Dagoberto
26	DF	BRA	Thiago Carleto
27	DF	BRA	Diogo
28	MF	BRA	Wellington
29	MF	BRA	Casemiro
32	DF	BRA	Samuel
33	GK	BRA	Denis
37	FW	BRA	Lucas
77	DF	BRA	Ilsinho
99	FW	BRA	Ricardo Oliveira (on loan from Al-Jazira)

=== Out on loan ===
Note: Flags indicate national team as defined under FIFA eligibility rules; some limited exceptions apply. Players may hold more than one non-FIFA nationality.

No.	Pos.	Nation	Player
—	GK	BRA	Fabiano (on loan to América-RN)
—	GK	BRA	Everson (on loan to Guaratinguetá)
—	DF	BRA	Rafael (on loan to Fortaleza)
—	DF	BRA	Wagner Diniz (on loan to Atlético Paranaense)
—	DF	BRA	Alex Cazumba (on loan to Los Angeles Galaxy)
—	DF	BRA	Leonardo (on loan to Los Angeles Galaxy)
—	MF	BRA	Juninho (on loan to Los Angeles Galaxy)
—	MF	BRA	Bruno Formigoni (on loan to Figueirense)

No.	Pos.	Nation	Player
—	MF	BRA	Renan (on loan to Guarani)
—	MF	BRA	Rafinha (on loan to Coritiba)
—	MF	BRA	Carlinhos Paraíba (on loan to Guarani)
—	FW	BRA	Mazola (on loan to Guarani)
—	FW	BRA	Roger (on loan to Guarani)
—	FW	BRA	Henrique (on loan to Vitória)
—	DF	CHI	Nélson Saavedra (on loan to Atlético Goianiense)
—	MF	BRA	Marcelinho Paraíba (on loan to Sport Recife)

=== Transfers ===
==== In ====
Note: Flags indicate national team as defined under FIFA eligibility rules; some limited exceptions apply. Players may hold more than one non-FIFA nationality.

No.	Pos.	Nation	Player
—	FW	BRA	Fernandinho (from Grêmio Barueri)
—	DF	BRA	André Luís (from Grêmio Barueri)
—	DF	BRA	Xandão (from Grêmio Barueri)
—	MF	BRA	Marcelinho Paraíba (from Coritiba)
—	MF	BRA	Carlinhos Paraíba (from Coritiba)
—	MF	BRA	Léo Lima (from Goiás)
—	MF	BRA	Rodrigo Souto (from Santos)
—	DF	BRA	Alex Silva (on loan from Hamburger SV)
—	MF	BRA	Cléber Santana (from Atlético Madrid)
—	DF	BRA	Cicinho (on loan from Roma)
—	DF	BRA	Thiago Carleto (from Valencia)
—	FW	BRA	Fernandão (from Goiás)
—	DF	BRA	Samuel (from Joinville)
—	FW	BRA	Ricardo Oliveira (on loan from Al-Jazira)
—	DF	BRA	Ilsinho (from Shakhtar Donetsk)

==== Out ====
Note: Flags indicate national team as defined under FIFA eligibility rules; some limited exceptions apply. Players may hold more than one non-FIFA nationality.

No.	Pos.	Nation	Player
—	DF	BRA	Rodrigo (return to FC Dynamo Kyiv)
—	FW	BRA	Borges (to Grêmio)
—	MF	BRA	Hugo (to Grêmio)
—	DF	BRA	André Dias (to Lazio)
—	DF	BRA	André Luís (to Fluminense)
—	MF	BRA	Léo Lima (to Al-Nasr)
—	DF	BRA	Cicinho (return to Roma)
—	FW	BRA	Roger (to Kashiwa Reysol)
—	DF	ARG	Adrián González (to Arsenal de Sarandí)
—	FW	BRA	Washington (to Fluminense)
—	MF	BRA	Hernanes (to Lazio)
—	MF	BRA	Jorge Wagner (to Kashiwa Reysol)
—	MF	BRA	Richarlyson (to Atlético Mineiro)

== Competitions ==
=== Overall ===
Games played	71 (21 Campeonato Paulista, 12 Copa Libertadores, 38 Campeonato Brasileiro)
Games won	33 (11 Campeonato Paulista, 7 Copa Libertadores, 15 Campeonato Brasileiro)
Games drawn	16 (3 Campeonato Paulista, 3 Copa Libertadores, 10 Campeonato Brasileiro)
Games lost	22 (7 Campeonato Paulista, 2 Copa Libertadores, 13 Campeonato Brasileiro)
Goals scored	112
Goals conceded	83
Goal difference	+29
Best result	5–0 (H) v Botafogo - Campeonato Paulista - 2010.04.04
Worst result	1–4 (H) v Fluminense - Campeonato Brasileiro - 2010.11.21
Top scorer	Dagoberto (15 goals)

Source: São Paulo FC

=== Appearances and goals ===
No.	Pos	Nat	Player	Total		Campeonato Paulista		Copa Libertadores		Campeonato Brasileiro	
No.	Pos	Nat	Player	Apps	Goals	Apps	Goals	Apps	Goals	Apps	Goals
01	GK	(Brazil) BRA	Rogério Ceni	70	8	20+0	3	12+0	1	38+0	4
2	MF	(Brazil) BRA	Jean	63	3	17+0	1	7+6	0	32+1	2
3	DF	(Brazil) BRA	André Dias	2	1	2+0	1	0+0	0	0+0	0
3	DF	(Brazil) BRA	Alex Silva	41	1	9+0	0	10+0	1	21+1	0
4	DF	(Brazil) BRA	André Luís	7	1	6+1	1	0+0	0	0+0	0
5	DF	(Brazil) BRA	Miranda	57	2	19+0	1	11+0	0	27+0	1
6	DF	(Brazil) BRA	Júnior César	39	1	11+2	1	8+1	0	17+0	0
7	MF	(Brazil) BRA	Jorge Wagner	43	1	13+2	1	6+1	0	13+8	0
8	MF	(Brazil) BRA	Cléber Santana	42	3	7+5	1	5+3	0	14+8	2
9	FW	(Brazil) BRA	Washington	29	13	13+1	6	6+3	5	3+3	2
10	MF	(Brazil) BRA	Hernanes	42	10	17+2	6	12+0	2	9+2	2
11	MF	(Brazil) BRA	Marcelinho Paraíba	25	3	8+4	2	3+2	0	4+4	1
12	FW	(Brazil) BRA	Fernandinho	36	6	4+6	4	2+6	1	10+8	1
13	DF	(Brazil) BRA	Xandão	35	1	8+1	0	3+2	0	19+2	1
14	DF	(Brazil) BRA	Renato Silva	23	1	6+0	0	1+2	0	11+3	1
15	FW	(Brazil) BRA	Fernandão	31	8	0+0	0	4+0	0	24+3	8
16	MF	(Brazil) BRA	Marlos	53	5	7+6	1	6+2	0	18+14	4
18	MF	(Brazil) BRA	Rodrigo Souto	49	3	10+1	3	8+3	0	27+0	0
19	FW	(Brazil) BRA	Roger	6	1	2+4	1	0+0	0	0+0	0
20	MF	(Brazil) BRA	Richarlyson	47	1	11+1	1	9+0	0	25+1	0
21	DF	(Argentina) ARG	Adrián González	2	0	2+0	0	0+0	0	0+0	0
22	GK	(Brazil) BRA	Bosco	1	0	1+0	0	0+0	0	0+0	0
23	DF	(Brazil) BRA	Cicinho	25	0	6+3	0	8+2	0	4+2	0
25	FW	(Brazil) BRA	Dagoberto	48	15	14+1	5	10+0	3	16+7	7
26	DF	(Brazil) BRA	Thiago Carleto	3	0	1+0	0	0+0	0	2+0	0
27	MF	(Brazil) BRA	Léo Lima	19	4	9+6	2	1+1	1	2+0	1
27	DF	(Brazil) BRA	Diogo	6	0	0+0	0	0+0	0	4+2	0
28	MF	(Brazil) BRA	Wellington	7	0	1+2	0	0+0	0	3+1	0
29	FW	(Brazil) BRA	Henrique	7	1	2+5	1	0+0	0	0+0	0
29	MF	(Brazil) BRA	Casemiro	18	2	0+0	0	0+0	0	16+2	2
30	MF	(Brazil) BRA	Oscar	0	0	0+0	0	0+0	0	0+0	0
31	MF	(Brazil) BRA	Carlinhos Paraíba	20	0	3+1	0	0+0	0	10+6	0
31	DF	(Brazil) BRA	Aislan	0	0	0+0	0	0+0	0	0+0	0
32	DF	(Brazil) BRA	Samuel	8	0	0+0	0	0+0	0	6+2	0
33	GK	(Brazil) BRA	Denis	0	0	0+0	0	0+0	0	0+0	0
34	DF	(Brazil) BRA	Bruno Uvini	2	0	0+0	0	0+0	0	0+2	0
35	DF	(Brazil) BRA	David	1	0	1+0	0	0+0	0	0+0	0
35	MF	(Brazil) BRA	Zé Vitor	9	0	0+0	0	0+0	0	2+7	0
36	MF	(Brazil) BRA	Sergio Mota	7	0	0+4	0	0+0	0	0+3	0
37	FW	(Brazil) BRA	Mazola	1	0	1+0	0	0+0	0	0+0	0
37	MF	(Brazil) BRA	Lucas	26	4	0+0	0	0+0	0	23+3	4
39	FW	(Brazil) BRA	Lucas Gaúcho	5	2	0+0	0	0+0	0	3+2	2
77	MF	(Brazil) BRA	Ilsinho	9	1	0+0	0	0+0	0	2+7	1
99	FW	(Brazil) BRA	Ricardo Oliveira	17	8	0+0	0	1+1	1	14+1	7

=== Scorers ===
Position	Nation	Playing position	Name	Campeonato Paulista	Copa Libertadores	Campeonato Brasileiro	Total
1	(Brazil)	FW	Dagoberto	5	3	7	15
2	(Brazil)	FW	Washington	6	5	2	13
3	(Brazil)	MF	Hernanes	6	2	2	10
4	(Brazil)	FW	Fernandão	0	0	8	8
=	(Brazil)	FW	Ricardo Oliveira	0	1	7	8
=	(Brazil)	GK	Rogério Ceni	3	1	4	8
5	(Brazil)	FW	Fernandinho	4	1	1	6
6	(Brazil)	MF	Marlos	1	0	4	5
7	(Brazil)	MF	Léo Lima	2	1	1	4
=	(Brazil)	MF	Lucas	0	0	4	4
8	(Brazil)	MF	Cléber Santana	1	0	2	3
=	(Brazil)	MF	Jean	1	0	2	3
=	(Brazil)	MF	Marcelinho Paraíba	2	0	1	3
=	(Brazil)	MF	Rodrigo Souto	3	0	0	3
9	(Brazil)	MF	Casemiro	0	0	2	2
=	(Brazil)	FW	Lucas Gaúcho	0	0	2	2
=	(Brazil)	DF	Miranda	1	0	1	2
10	(Brazil)	DF	Alex Silva	0	1	0	1
=	(Brazil)	DF	André Dias	1	0	0	1
=	(Brazil)	DF	André Luís	1	0	0	1
=	(Brazil)	FW	Henrique	1	0	0	1
=	(Brazil)	DF	Ilsinho	0	0	1	1
=	(Brazil)	MF	Jorge Wagner	1	0	0	1
=	(Brazil)	DF	Júnior César	1	0	0	1
=	(Brazil)	DF	Renato Silva	0	0	1	1
=	(Brazil)	MF	Richarlyson	1	0	0	1
=	(Brazil)	FW	Roger	1	0	0	1
=	(Brazil)	DF	Xandão	0	0	1	1
/	/	/	Own goals	1	0	1	2
			Total	43	15	54	112

=== Managers performance ===
Name	Nationality	From	To	P	W	D	L	GF	GA	Win%
Ricardo Gomes	Brazil	17 January	5 August	45	22	9	14	73	43	55%
Milton Cruz	Brazil	8 August	8 August	1	0	1	0	1	1	33%
Sérgio Baresi	Brazil	15 August	2 October	14	5	4	5	18	23	45%
Paulo César Carpegiani	Brazil	6 October	5 December	11	6	2	3	20	16	60%

=== Campeonato Paulista ===
17 January Round 1	São Paulo	1–3	Portuguesa	São Paulo
17:00 UTC−02:00	Marcelinho Paraíba 38'	Report	Héverton 54', 90+1'; Marco Antônio 58' (pen.)	Stadium: Estádio Cícero Pompeu de Toledo (Morumbi); Attendance: 18,074; Referee: Antônio Rogério Batista do Prado

20 January Round 2	Mirassol	1–1	São Paulo	Mirassol
21:50 UTC−02:00	Evando 6'	Report	Richarlyson 89'	Stadium: Estádio Municipal José Maria de Campos Maia; Attendance: 6,016; Referee: Philippe Lombard

23 January Round 3	São Paulo	3–0	Rio Claro	São Paulo
19:30 UTC−02:00	Hernanes 38'; Washington 55'; Rogério Ceni 90' (pen.)	Report		Stadium: Estádio Cícero Pompeu de Toledo (Morumbi); Attendance: 8,384; Referee: Rodrigo Braghetto

28 January Round 4	São Paulo	3–0	Paulista	Barueri
17:00 UTC−02:00	Dagoberto 28', 54'; André Dias 65'	Report		Stadium: Arena Barueri; Attendance: 4,979; Referee: Rodrigo Martins Cintra

31 January Round 5	Sertãozinho	2–2	São Paulo	Ribeirão Preto
19:30 UTC−02:00	Thiago Silvy 54'; Mendes 62'	Report	Léo Lima 55'; Marcos Vinícius 90+3' (o.g.)	Stadium: Estádio Santa Cruz; Attendance: 5,637; Referee: Raphael Claus

3 February Round 6	São Paulo	3–0	São Caetano	Barueri
21:50 UTC−02:00	Washington 24'; Dagoberto 36'; Hernanes 90+1'	Report		Stadium: Arena Barueri; Attendance: 4,875; Referee: Rodrigo Guarizo do Amaral

7 February Round 7	São Paulo	1–2	Santos	Barueri
17:00 UTC−02:00	Roger 66'	Report	Neymar 37' (pen.); Robinho 86'	Stadium: Arena Barueri; Attendance: 14,519; Referee: Marcelo Rogério

13 February Round 8	Ituano	0–1	São Paulo	Itu
16:00 UTC−02:00		Report	Rogério Ceni 16' (pen.)	Stadium: Estádio Municipal Dr. Novelli Júnior; Attendance: 6,953; Referee: Paulo César de Oliveira

18 February Round 9	São Paulo	3–1	Grêmio Barueri	São Paulo
21:50 UTC−02:00	Washington 23'; Marcelinho Paraíba 44' (pen.); Henrique 90+3'	Report	Marcos Assunção 21'	Stadium: Estádio Cícero Pompeu de Toledo (Morumbi); Attendance: 5,945; Referee: Guilherme Cereta de Lima

21 February Round 10	Palmeiras	2–0	São Paulo	São Paulo
17:00 UTC−03:00	Robert 53', 68'	Report		Stadium: Estádio Palestra Itália (Parque Antárctica); Attendance: 13,950; Referee: Rodrigo Martins Cintra

28 February Round 11	São Paulo	5–1	Monte Azul	Barueri
17:00 UTC−03:00	Léo Lima 3'; Fernandinho 49', 62', 69', 86'	Report	Lopes 68'	Stadium: Arena Barueri; Attendance: 4,362; Referee: Flávio Rodrigues Guerra

3 March Round 12	Oeste	0–0	São Paulo	Araraquara
21:50 UTC−03:00		Report		Stadium: Estádio Dr. Adhemar de Barros (Fonte Luminosa); Attendance: 7,610; Referee: Marcelo Aparecido de Souza

7 March Round 13	Ponte Preta	0–2	São Paulo	Campinas
19:30 UTC−03:00		Report	Washington 15', 40'	Stadium: Estádio Moisés Lucarelli; Attendance: 9,487; Referee: Edson Reis Pavani Junior

14 March Round 14	São Paulo	2–1	Rio Branco	São Paulo
17:00 UTC−03:00	Jorge Wagner 11'; André Luís 90+1'	Report	Márcio Carioca 81'	Stadium: Estádio Cícero Pompeu de Toledo (Morumbi); Attendance: 9,370; Referee: Salvio Spinola Fagundes Filho

21 March Round 15	São Paulo	3–0	Mogi Mirim	São Paulo
17:00 UTC−03:00	Rogério Ceni 13' (pen.); Cléber Santana 40'; Hernanes 90+2'	Report		Stadium: Estádio Cícero Pompeu de Toledo (Morumbi); Attendance: 9,763; Referee: Wilson Luiz Seneme

24 March Round 16	Bragantino	1–0	São Paulo	Bragança Paulista
21:50 UTC−03:00	Maurício 81'	Report		Stadium: Estádio Nabi Abi Chedid; Attendance: 4,248; Referee: José Henrique de Carvalho

28 March Round 17	Corinthians	4–3	São Paulo	São Paulo
16:00 UTC−03:00	Elias 17'; Danilo 34'; Roberto Carlos 52'; Alex Silva 90+2' (o.g.)	Report	Jean 43'; Rodrigo Souto 74', 82'	Stadium: Estádio Municipal Paulo Machado de Carvalho (Pacaembu); Attendance: 24,557; Referee: Wilson Luiz Seneme

4 April Round 18	São Paulo	5–0	Botafogo	São Paulo
16:00 UTC−03:00	Marlos 45'; Hernanes 59', 82'; Rodrigo Souto 67'; Júnior César 69'	Report		Stadium: Estádio Cícero Pompeu de Toledo (Morumbi); Attendance: 8,774; Referee: Paulo César de Oliveira

7 April Round 19	Santo André	1–3	São Paulo	Piracicaba
21:50 UTC−03:00	Rodrigão 38'	Report	Washington 8'; Dagoberto 20'; Miranda 63'	Stadium: Estádio Barão da Serra Negra; Attendance: 12,908; Referee: Luiz Flávio de Oliveira

11 April Semifinals	São Paulo	2–3	Santos	São Paulo
16:00 UTC−03:00	Hernanes 52'; Dagoberto 66'	Report	Júnior César 25' (o.g.); André 40'; Durval 89'	Stadium: Estádio Cícero Pompeu de Toledo (Morumbi); Attendance: 35,695; Referee: Marcelo Rogério

18 April Semifinals	Santos	3–0	São Paulo	Santos
16:00 UTC−03:00	Neymar 59', 82' (pen.); Paulo Henrique 87'	Report		Stadium: Estádio Urbano Caldeira (Vila Belmiro); Attendance: 13,785; Referee: José Henrique de Carvalho

==== Record ====
Points	Matches	Wins	Draws	Losses	Goals for	Goals against	Win%
36	21	11	3	7	43	25	57%

=== Copa Libertadores ===
10 February Second Stage	São Paulo (Brazil)	2–0	(Mexico) Monterrey	São Paulo
21:50 UTC−02:00	Washington 13', 76'	Report		Stadium: Estádio Cícero Pompeu de Toledo (Morumbi); Attendance: 34,501; Referee: Sergio Pezzotta (Argentina)

25 February Second Stage	Once Caldas (Colombia)	2–1	(Brazil) São Paulo	Manizales
19:10 (UTC-5)	Uribe 49'; Moreno 71'	Report	Rogério Ceni 33'	Stadium: Estadio Palogrande; Attendance: 35,000; Referee: Pablo Pozo (Chile)

11 March Second Stage	Nacional (Paraguay)	0–2	(Brazil) São Paulo	Asunción
20:30 UTC−02:00		Report	Washington 59', 89'	Stadium: Estadio Defensores del Chaco; Attendance: 700; Referee: Enrique Osses (Paraguay)

18 March Second Stage	São Paulo (Brazil)	3–0	(Paraguay) Nacional	São Paulo
21:30 UTC−03:00	Dagoberto 30'; Léo Lima 33'; Washington 55'	Report		Stadium: Estádio Cícero Pompeu de Toledo (Morumbi); Attendance: 31,411; Referee: Darío Ubriaco (Uruguay)

31 March Second Stage	Monterrey (Mexico)	0–0	(Brazil) São Paulo	Monterrey
18:50 (UTC-6)		Report		Stadium: Estadio Tecnológico; Attendance: 32,500; Referee: Saúl Laverni (Argentina)

21 April Second Stage	São Paulo (Brazil)	1–0	(Colombia) Once Caldas	São Paulo
21:50 UTC−03:00	Fernandinho 40'	Report		Stadium: Estádio Cícero Pompeu de Toledo (Morumbi); Attendance: 50,461; Referee: Diego Abal (Argentina)

28 April Round of 16	Universitario (Peru)	0–0	(Brazil) São Paulo	Lima
17:30 UTC−05:00		Report		Stadium: Estadio Monumental; Referee: Saúl Laverni (Argentina)

4 May Round of 16	São Paulo (Brazil)	0–0 (3–1 p)	(Peru) Universitario	São Paulo
19:30 UTC−03:00		Report		Stadium: Estádio Cícero Pompeu de Toledo (Morumbi); Attendance: 43,838; Referee: Carlos Torres (Paraguay)
	Penalties
	Rogério Ceni (penalty missed); Hernanes (penalty scored); Marcelinho (penalty scored); Dagoberto (penalty scored)		(penalty scored) Ramírez; (penalty missed) Alva; (penalty missed) Galván; (penalty missed) Labarthe

12 May Quarterfinals	Cruzeiro (Brazil)	0–2	(Brazil) São Paulo	Belo Horizonte
21:50 UTC−03:00		Report	Dagoberto 23'; Hernanes 65'	Stadium: Estádio Governador Magalhães Pinto (Mineirão); Attendance: 48,602; Referee: Óscar Ruiz (Colombia)

19 May Quarterfinals	São Paulo (Brazil)	2–0	(Brazil) Cruzeiro	São Paulo
21:50 UTC−03:00	Hernanes 24'; Dagoberto 53'	Report		Stadium: Estádio Cícero Pompeu de Toledo (Morumbi); Attendance: 52,196; Referee: Jorge Larrionda (Uruguay)

28 July Semifinals	Internacional (Brazil)	1–0	(Brazil) São Paulo	Porto Alegre
21:50 UTC−03:00	Giuliano 67'	Report		Stadium: Estádio José Pinheiro Borba (Beira-Rio); Attendance: 48,166; Referee: Hector Baldassi (Argentina)

5 August Semifinals	São Paulo (Brazil)	2–1	(Brazil) Internacional	São Paulo
21:50 UTC−03:00	Alex Silva 30'; Ricardo Oliveira 54'	Report	Alecsandro 52'	Stadium: Estádio Cícero Pompeu de Toledo (Morumbi); Attendance: 57,113; Referee: Carlos Amarilla (Paraguay)

==== Record ====
Points	Matches	Wins	Draws	Losses	Goals for	Goals against	Win%
24	12	7	3	2	15	4	66%

=== Campeonato Brasileiro ===
9 May Round 1	Flamengo	1–1	São Paulo	Rio de Janeiro
16:00 UTC−03:00	Dênis Marques 50'	Report	Washington 44'	Stadium: Estádio Jornalista Mário Filho (Maracanã); Attendance: 7,729; Referee: Leandro Pedro Vuaden

16 May Round 2	São Paulo	1–2	Botafogo	São Paulo
16:00 UTC−03:00	Léo Lima 8'	Report	Antônio Carlos 28'; Renato Cajá 88'	Stadium: Estádio Cícero Pompeu de Toledo (Morumbi); Attendance: 11,672; Referee: Sandro Meira Ricci

23 May Round 3	Internacional	0–2	São Paulo	Porto Alegre
16:00 UTC−03:00		Report	Hernanes 37'; Fernandão 62'	Stadium: Estádio José Pinheiro Borba (Beira-Rio); Attendance: 28,824; Referee: Marcelo de Lima Henrique

26 May Round 4	São Paulo	1–0	Palmeiras	São Paulo
20:30 UTC−03:00	Fernandão 54'	Report		Stadium: Estádio Cícero Pompeu de Toledo (Morumbi); Attendance: 15,522; Referee: Marcelo Aparecido Ribeiro De Souza

30 May Round 5	Guarani	0–0	São Paulo	Campinas
16:00 UTC−03:00		Report		Stadium: Estádio Brinco de Ouro da Princesa; Attendance: 14,528; Referee: Guilherme Ceretta De Lima

2 June Round 6	Goiás	2–1	São Paulo	Goiânia
21:50 UTC−03:00	Bernardo 38' (pen.); Jonílson 89'	Report	Marcelinho Paraíba 14'	Stadium: Estádio do Governo do Estado de Goiás (Serra Dourada); Attendance: 15,592; Referee: Nielson Nogueira Dias

6 June Round 7	São Paulo	3–1	Grêmio	São Paulo
16:00 UTC−03:00	Dagoberto 17', 66', 68'	Report	Hugo 7'	Stadium: Estádio Cícero Pompeu de Toledo (Morumbi); Attendance: 14,408; Referee: Gutemberg de Paula Fonseca

14 July Round 8	São Paulo	1–2	Avaí	São Paulo
19:30 UTC−03:00	Hernanes 76'	Report	Roberto 60'; Vandinho 65'	Stadium: Estádio Cícero Pompeu de Toledo (Morumbi); Attendance: 7,717; Referee: Francisco Carlos Nascimento

17 July Round 9	Vitória	3–2	São Paulo	Salvador
18:30 UTC−03:00	Elkeson 13'; Schwenck 47'; Ramon 57'	Report	Jean 38'; Fernandão 61'	Stadium: Estádio Manoel Barradas (Barradão); Attendance: 11,915; Referee: Marcelo de Lima Henrique

21 July Round 10	São Paulo	1–1	Grêmio Prudente	São Paulo
19:30 UTC−03:00	Washington 1'	Report	Anderson Luis 21'	Stadium: Estádio Cícero Pompeu de Toledo (Morumbi); Attendance: 9,646; Referee: Rodrigo Martins Cintra

25 July Round 11	Santos	1–0	São Paulo	Santos
16:00 UTC−03:00	Renato Silva 60' (o.g.)	Report		Stadium: Estádio Urbano Caldeira (Vila Belmiro); Attendance: 9,367; Referee: Luiz Flavio De Oliveira

31 July Round 12	São Paulo	2–1	Ceará	São Paulo
18:30 UTC−03:00	Fernandão 66'; Ricardo Oliveira 68'	Report	Erick Flores 84'	Stadium: Estádio Cícero Pompeu de Toledo (Morumbi); Attendance: 11,793; Referee: Evandro Rogério Roman

8 August Round 13	Atlético Paranaense	1–1	São Paulo	Curitiba
18:30 UTC−03:00	Maikon Leite 71'	Report	Cléber Santana 67'	Stadium: Estádio Joaquim Américo Guimarães (Arena da Baixada); Attendance: 21,789; Referee: Gutemberg de Paula Fonseca

15 August Round 14	São Paulo	2–2	Cruzeiro	São Paulo
16:00 UTC−03:00	Casemiro 41'; Ricardo Oliveira 90'	Report	Wellington Paulista 67'; Thiago Ribeiro 83'	Stadium: Estádio Cícero Pompeu de Toledo (Morumbi); Attendance: 12,338; Referee: Leandro Pedro Vuaden

22 August Round 15	Corinthians	3–0	São Paulo	São Paulo
18:30 UTC−03:00	Elias 22', 45'; Jucilei 71'	Report		Stadium: Estádio Municipal Paulo Machado de Carvalho (Pacaembu); Attendance: 28,159; Referee: Wilson Luiz Seneme

25 August Round 16	São Paulo	0–0	Vasco da Gama	São Paulo
21:50 UTC−03:00		Report		Stadium: Estádio Cícero Pompeu de Toledo (Morumbi); Attendance: 10,802; Referee: Carlos Eugênio Simon

29 August Round 17	Fluminense	2–2	São Paulo	Rio de Janeiro
18:30 UTC−03:00	Deco 9'; Leandro Euzébio 59'	Report	Rogério Ceni 34'; Fernandão 36'	Stadium: Estádio Jornalista Mário Filho (Maracanã); Attendance: 32,804; Referee: Leandro Pedro Vuaden

2 September Round 18	São Paulo	2–1	Atlético Goianiense	São Paulo
21:00 UTC−03:00	Xandão 23'; Dagoberto 68'	Report	Juninho 50'	Stadium: Estádio Cícero Pompeu de Toledo (Morumbi); Attendance: 9,364; Referee: Paulo Henrique Godoy Bezerra

5 September Round 19	Atlético Mineiro	2–3	São Paulo	Ipatinga
18:30 UTC−03:00	Obina 17' (pen.), 35' (pen.)	Report	Casemiro 10'; Lucas 55'; Fernandão 60'	Stadium: Estádio Municipal Epaminondas Mendes Brito (Ipatingão); Attendance: 11,120; Referee: André Luiz de Freitas Castro

8 September Round 20	São Paulo	2–0	Flamengo	São Paulo
22:00 UTC−03:00	Marlos 8'; Fernandão 41'	Report		Stadium: Estádio Cícero Pompeu de Toledo (Morumbi); Attendance: 14,389; Referee: Alício Pena Júnior

12 September Round 21	Botafogo	2–0	São Paulo	Rio de Janeiro
16:00 UTC−03:00	Abreu 67'; Edno 80'	Report		Stadium: Estádio Olímpico João Havelange (Engenhão); Attendance: 24,050; Referee: Carlos Eugênio Simon

16 September Round 22	São Paulo	1–3	Internacional	São Paulo
21:00 UTC−03:00	Cléber Santana 19'	Report	Wilson Mathías 10'; Leandro Damião 29'; Giuliano 61'	Stadium: Estádio Cícero Pompeu de Toledo (Morumbi); Attendance: 11,327; Referee: Felipe Gomes da Silva

19 September Round 23	Palmeiras	0–2	São Paulo	São Paulo
16:00 UTC−03:00		Report	Lucas 54'; Fernandão 75'	Stadium: Estádio Municipal Paulo Machado de Carvalho (Pacaembu); Attendance: 15,011; Referee: José Henrique de Carvalho

22 September Round 24	São Paulo	2–1	Guarani	São Paulo
19:30 UTC−03:00	Marlos 15'; Ricardo Oliveira 63'	Report	Baiano 45+2' (pen.)	Stadium: Estádio Cícero Pompeu de Toledo (Morumbi); Attendance: 10,264; Referee: Marcelo Aparecido de Souza

25 September Round 25	São Paulo	0–3	Goiás	São Paulo
18:30 UTC−03:00		Report	Carlos Alberto 23'; Rafael Moura 35', 45+1'	Stadium: Estádio Cícero Pompeu de Toledo (Morumbi); Attendance: 18,528; Referee: Célio Amorim

29 September Round 26	Grêmio	4–2	São Paulo	Porto Alegre
22:00 UTC−03:00	André Lima 29', 39'; Jonas 68' (pen.); Diego 75'	Report	Rogério Ceni 41' (pen.); Marlos 53'	Stadium: Estádio Olímpico Monumental; Attendance: 25,322; Referee: Ricardo Marques Ribeiro

2 October Round 27	Avaí	0–0	São Paulo	Florianópolis
21:00 UTC−03:00		Report (pt)		Stadium: Estádio Aderbal Ramos da Silva (Ressacada); Attendance: 8,040; Referee: Alicio Pena Júnior

6 October Round 28	São Paulo	2–0	Vitória	Barueri
22:00 UTC−03:00	Dagoberto 17'; Fernandinho 29'	Report (pt)		Stadium: Arena Barueri; Attendance: 14,374; Referee: Claudio Mercante

9 October Round 29	Grêmio Prudente	2–3	São Paulo	Presidente Prudente
18:30 UTC−03:00	Wesley 32', 90+1'	Report (pt)	Ricardo Oliveira 8', 32', 57'	Stadium: Estádio Eduardo José Farah (Prudentão); Attendance: 12,969; Referee: Rodrigo Martins Cintra

17 October Round 30	São Paulo	4–3	Santos	São Paulo
18:30 UTC−02:00	Dagoberto 7', 16'; Pará 19' (o.g.); Jean 90+2'	Report (pt)	Alan Patrick 4'; Zé Eduardo 20'; Neymar 70' (pen.)	Stadium: Estádio Cícero Pompeu de Toledo (Morumbi); Attendance: 23,791; Referee: Sandro Meira Ricci

24 October Round 31	Ceará	2–0	São Paulo	Fortaleza
16:00 UTC−02:00	Magno Alves 20'; Diego Sacoman 34'	Report (pt)		Stadium: Estádio Governador Plácido Aderaldo Castelo (Castelão); Attendance: 44,591; Referee: Marcelo de Lima Henrique

28 October Round 32	São Paulo	2–1	Atlético Paranaense	Barueri
21:00 UTC−02:00	Ricardo Oliveira 12'; Miranda 50'	Report (pt)	Guerrón 25'	Stadium: Arena Barueri; Attendance: 16,480; Referee: Márcio Chagas da Silva

3 November Round 33	Cruzeiro	0–2	São Paulo	Uberlândia
21:50 UTC−02:00		Report (pt)	Lucas 52'; Rogério Ceni 80' (pen.)	Stadium: Estádio Municipal João Havelange (Parque do Sabiá); Attendance: 25,694; Referee: Nielson Nogueira Dias

7 November Round 34	São Paulo	0–2	Corinthians	São Paulo
17:00 UTC−02:00		Report (pt)	Elias 39'; Dentinho 84'	Stadium: Estádio Cícero Pompeu de Toledo (Morumbi); Attendance: 42,667; Referee: Carlos Eugênio Simon

14 November Round 35	Vasco da Gama	1–1	São Paulo	Rio de Janeiro
19:30 UTC−02:00	Éder Luís 60'	Report (pt)	Lucas Gaúcho 70'	Stadium: Estádio Vasco da Gama (São Januário); Attendance: 5,674; Referee: Wagner Reway

21 November Round 36	São Paulo	1–4	Fluminense	Barueri
17:00 UTC−02:00	Lucas Gaúcho 55'	Report (pt)	Gum 35'; Conca 74', 88'; Fred 77'	Stadium: Arena Barueri; Attendance: 14,410; Referee: Heber Roberto Lopes

28 November Round 37	Atlético Goianiense	1–1	São Paulo	Goiânia
17:00 UTC−02:00	Elias 64'	Report (pt)	Rogério Ceni 52' (pen.)	Stadium: Estádio do Governo do Estado de Goiás (Serra Dourada); Attendance: 27,938; Referee: Carlos Eugênio Simon

5 December Round 38	São Paulo	4–0	Atlético Mineiro	São Paulo
17:00 UTC−02:00	Ilsinho 27'; Lucas 31'; Marlos 41'; Renato Silva 46'	Report (pt)		Stadium: Estádio Cícero Pompeu de Toledo (Morumbi); Attendance: 9,782; Referee: Marcelo de Lima Henrique

==== Record ====
Final position	Points	Matches	Wins	Draws	Losses	Goals for	Goals against	Win%
9th	55	38	15	10	13	54	54	48%

== See also ==
- São Paulo FC
