= Vinícius (footballer, born June 1983) =

Brazilian footballer

Personal information
- Full name: Vinícius Rodrigues Tomaz da Silva Almeida
- Date of birth: 26 June 1983 (age 43)
- Place of birth: Dias d'Ávila, Brazil
- Height: 1.87 m (6 ft 1 1/2 in)
- Position: Midfielder

Youth career
- 2001–2002: Vitória

Senior career*
Years	Team	Apps	(Gls)
2003–2005	Vitória	41	(1)
2005	Atlético Mineiro	14	(1)
2006–2008	Iraty	0	(0)
2006	→ Avaí (loan)		
2007	→ Santos (loan)	2	(0)
2007–2008	→ Avaí (loan)		
2009	América de Natal	0	(0)
2010	Bahia de Feira	0	(0)
2010–2011	Sampaio Corrêa	6	(0)
- * Club domestic league appearances and goals

Vinícius Rodrigues Tomaz da Silva Almeida (born 26 June 1983) is a Brazilian former footballer.

== Biography ==
Born in Dias d'Ávila, Bahia, Vinícius started his career with Vitória, located in Salvador, the state capital. In September 2005, he was signed by Atlético Mineiro and played a season for the club at 2005 Campeonato Brasileiro Série A. In January 2006 he was signed by Iraty (de facto controlled by investment company) and immediately borrowed by Avaí for a year. He played 2006 and Campeonato Catarinense and 2006 Campeonato Brasileiro Série B for the club.

In January 2007, he was loaned to Santos along with Pedro. After winning Campeonato Paulista and played twice at 2007 Campeonato Brasileiro Série A, he was loaned to Avaí for another year.

In January 2009, he was transferred to América de Natal but released in August, after played nil at 2009 Campeonato Brasileiro Série B. In January 2010 he signed a 4 months contract with Bahia de Feira and released after the end of Campeonato Baiano.

== Honours ==
- Campeonato Paulista: 2007
