= Rafael Lopes (disambiguation) =

Rafael Lopes (born 1991), is a Portuguese football forward

Rafael Lopes may also refer to:

- Rafael Lopes (Brazilian footballer) (born 1986), Brazilian football right-back
- Rafael Araujo-Lopes (born 1996), American gridiron football wide receiver

== See also ==
- Rafael López (disambiguation)
