= Cláudio Cajado =

Brazilian politician (born 1963)

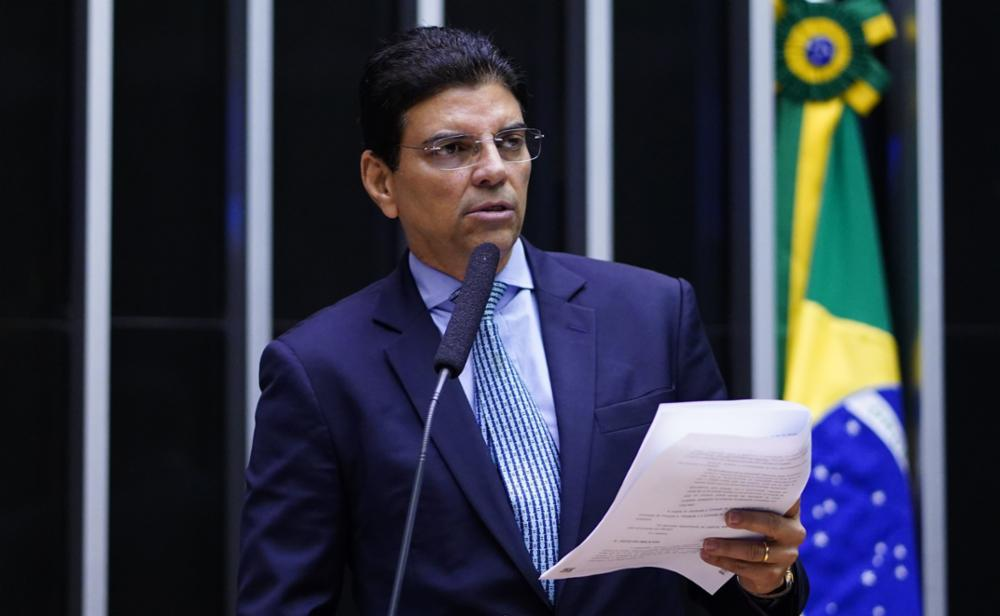
- Cajado in 2023

Member of the Chamber of Deputies
- Incumbent
- Assumed office 1 February 1995
- Constituency: Bahia

Member of the Municipal Chamber of Dias d'Ávila
- In office 1 January 1989 – 1 January 1993
- Constituency: At-large

Personal details
- Born: Cláudio Cajado Sampaio; 1 December 1963 (age 62) Salvador, Bahia, Brazil
- Party: PP (since 2018)
- Other political affiliations: DEM (1988–2018)

Cláudio Cajado Sampaio (born 1 December 1963) is a Brazilian politician serving as a member of the Chamber of Deputies since 1995. From 1989 to 1992, he was a city councillor of Dias d'Ávila.
