= Leonardo (footballer, born March 1986) =

Brazilian footballer

Personal information
- Full name: Leonardo José Aparecido Moura
- Date of birth: 9 March 1986 (age 40)
- Place of birth: Guarulhos, Brazil
- Height: 1.88 m (6 ft 2 in)
- Position: Centre-back

Youth career
- 1998–2003: Santos

Senior career*
Years	Team	Apps	(Gls)
2004–2005	Santos	18	(0)
2005–2012	Shakhtar Donetsk	16	(0)
2007	→ Santos (loan)	8	(0)
2008	→ São Caetano (loan)	11	(0)
2009	→ Vasco da Gama (loan)	5	(0)
2010	→ Grêmio Prudente (loan)	28	(0)
2011	→ Avaí (loan)	7	(0)
2011	→ Atlético Goianiense (loan)	14	(1)
2012–2013	Atlético Goianiense	6	(0)
2013	Criciúma	15	(1)
2014	Ponte Preta	1	(0)
2014	Bragantino	9	(0)
2015	Ituano	5	(0)
2015	Santos	3	(0)
2016	Mersin İdmanyurdu	0	(0)
2016	Santa Cruz	5	(0)
2016	Paraná	5	(0)
2017	Santo André	14	(2)
2017–2019	Levadiakos	20	(1)

International career
2002–2003	Brazil U17	5	(3)
2005	Brazil U20	5	(0)
- * Club domestic league appearances and goals

Leonardo José Aparecido Moura (born 9 March 1986), simply known as Leonardo, is a Brazilian retired professional footballer who played as a central defender.

== Club career ==
Leonardo was born in Guarulhos, São Paulo, and joined Santos' youth setup in 1998, aged 12. He was promoted to the main squad in 2004, and made his first team – and Série A – debut on 16 October, starting in a 4–0 home win against Ponte Preta.

On 22 July 2005, Leonardo signed a five-year contract with Shakhtar Donetsk, for a $1.8 million fee. Despite being regularly used, mainly in the 2006–07 campaign, he was shown the door by the club due to the new rules of the league.

Leonardo was loaned to Santos in February 2007, but after struggling with fitness, moved to São Caetano in March 2008 also in a temporary deal. He was more utilized during his spell at the latter,

On 9 February 2009, Leonardo was again loaned, this time to Vasco da Gama. On 18 June, after appearing rarely with the side, he returned to Shakhtar, being used only as a backup during the season.

Leonardo was subsequently loaned to Grêmio Prudente, Avaí and Atlético Goianiense, signing permanently with the latter in 2012.

On 18 June 2013, Leonardo joined Criciúma, He subsequently represented Ponte Preta, Bragantino and Ituano, all in his native state.

On 15 May 2015, Leonardo returned to Santos, signing until the end of 2016. On 6 January of the following year, after being rarely used, he rescinded his link, and joined Mersin İdmanyurdu a day later.

After only one league game in the 2018–19 season, Leonardos contract was terminated by mutual consent.

== International career ==
After representing Brazil in the under-17 and under-20 levels, Leonardo was called up to the main squad by manager Carlos Alberto Parreira on 18 April 2005, for a friendly against Guatemala. However, he did not play the match.

== Career statistics ==
As of 6 May 2018

Appearances and goals by club, season and competition
Club	Season	League			State League		Cup		Continental		Other		Total	
Club	Season	Division	Apps	Goals	Apps	Goals	Apps	Goals	Apps	Goals	Apps	Goals	Apps	Goals
Santos	2004	Série A	10	0	0	0	0	0	3 (Note: Appearance(s) in Copa Sudamericana)	0	—		13	0
Santos	2005	Série A	3	0	5	0	0	0	5 (Note: Appearance(s) in Copa Libertadores)	0	—		13	0
Santos	Total		13	0	5	0	0	0	8	0	0	0	26	0
Shakhtar Donetsk	2005–06	Ukrainian Premier League	6	0	—		1	0	—		—		7	0
Shakhtar Donetsk	2006–07	Ukrainian Premier League	10	0	—		4	0	1 (Note: Appearance(s) in UEFA Champions League)	0	1 (Note: Appearance(s) in Ukrainian Super Cup)	0	16	0
Shakhtar Donetsk	2009–10	Ukrainian Premier League	—		—		2	0	—		—		2	0
Shakhtar Donetsk	Total		16	0	—		7	0	1	0	1	0	25	0
Santos	2007	Série A	1	0	7	0	—		1	0	—		9	0
São Caetano	2008	Série B	11	0	—		6	0	—		—		17	0
Vasco da Gama	2009	Série B	1	0	4	0	1	0	—		—		6	0
Grêmio Barueri	2010	Série A	20	0	8	0	0	0	2	0	—		30	0
Avaí	2011	Série A	0	0	7	0	2	0	—		—		9	0
Atlético Goianiense	2011	Série A	14	1	—		—		—		—		14	1
Atlético Goianiense	2012	Série A	2	0	4	0	—		—		—		6	0
Atlético Goianiense	2013	Série B	0	0	0	0	0	0	—		—		0	0
Atlético Goianiense	Total		16	1	4	0	0	0	0	0	0	0	20	1
Criciúma	2013	Série A	15	1	—		0	0	2	0	—		17	1
Ponte Preta	2014	Série B	1	0	—		0	0	—		—		1	0
Bragantino	2014	Série B	9	0	—		2	0	—		—		11	0
Ituano	2015	Paulista	—		5	0	0	0	—		—		5	0
Santos	2015	Série A	3	0	—		0	0	—		—		3	0
Santa Cruz	2016	Série A	0	0	5	0	0	0	—		5	0	10	0
Paraná	2016	Série B	5	0	—		0	0	—		—		5	0
Santo André	2017	Paulista	—		14	2	1	0	—		—		15	2
Levadiakos	2017–18	Super League Greece	20	1	—		1	0	—		—		21	1
Career total			131	3	59	2	20	0	14	0	6	0	230	5

== Honours ==
Santos

- Série A: 2004
- Campeonato Paulista: 2007

Shakhtar Donetsk

- Ukrainian Premier League: 2005–06

Atlético Goianiense

- Campeonato Goiano: 2011, 2013

Brazil U17

- FIFA U-17 World Cup: 2003
