= Brasa Futebol Clube =

Brasa
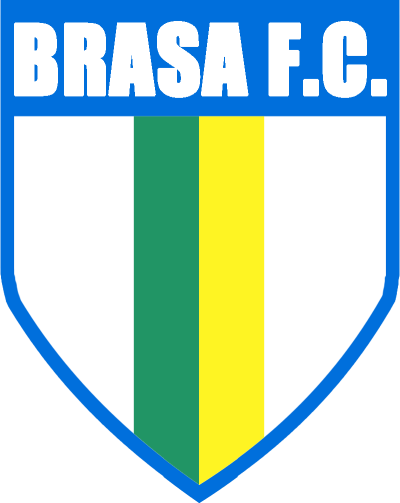
- Full name: Brasa Futebol Clube Ltda
- Founded: 5 March 2008; 18 years ago
- Dissolved: 2014; 12 years ago
Home colours	Away colours

Brasa Futebol Clube was a Brazilian football club based in Mirassol, São Paulo. It was famous for its involvement with third party ownership in association football. It has been reported that the investor behind the club was Energy Sports, a.k.a. Energy Empreendimentos e Participações. The club folded in 2014 without playing a single match in its history.

Brasa was the co-contractor of Diogo in 2008 with Corinthians; the deal saw Corinthians acquire 50% economic rights of the player from Brasa. Brasa also acquired Carlinhos from Santos in 2009. Energy Sports also acquired Marcos Aurélio from Santos in 2008 and injected the contract to Brasa in 2009.

The club also owned the registration rights of Emerson (2009), Felipe Soares (2009–10), Roger Gaúcho (2009) and Vinícius Bala (2009).

Portuguese club Benfica acquired Patric from Brasa in 2009; the deal also saw Brasa pay back Benfica an annual installments worth €300,000 per year to Brasa for a three-year period, between the 2009–10 and 2011–12 seasons, which Patric formally left Benfica in 2011. Alan Soares also moved from Brasa to Portuguese team Vitória de Sernache in 2009.
