= Emerson Paulista =

Brazilian footballer (born in 1980)

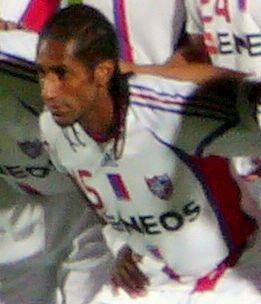

Personal information
- Full name: Emerson de Andrade Santos
- Date of birth: April 23, 1980 (age 46)
- Place of birth: São Paulo, Brazil
- Height: 1.72 m (5 ft 8 in)
- Position: Midfielder

Team information
- Current team: EC Noroeste

Youth career
- 1996–1998: Palmeiras

Senior career*
Years	Team	Apps	(Gls)
1999–2001	Palmeiras		
2002	Caxias		
2003	Rio Branco		
2003–2005	Palmeiras		
2005	→ Juventus-RB (loan)		
2005	→ Remo (loan)		
2006	São Bento		
2006	Ponte Preta	22	(2)
2007	Real Murcia	5	(0)
2007	Iraklis	14	(2)
2008	FC Tokyo	20	(3)
2009	Bragantino	8	(1)
2010	Paulista		
2010	Joinville		
2010	Shonan Bellmare	20	(5)
2011	Mogi Mirim		
2012	Botafogo (SP)		
2013	EC Noroeste		
- * Club domestic league appearances and goals as of 15 December 2008

Emerson de Andrade Santos (born April 23, 1980), also known as Emerson Paulista or just Emerson, is a Brazilian footballer who currently plays for Esporte Clube Noroeste.

== Biography ==
In February 2008 Emerson joined Japanese club FC Tokyo in 1-year deal. The club did not renewed his contract in December 2008. In April 2009 he returned to Brazil and signed a short-term contract with Brasa Futebol Clube, a proxy club of investment group and football agent Energy Sports. He was represented by Energy Sports but did not form any deal with any clubs in the first half of the 2009 season. In mid-2009 he left for Bragantino.

Emerson signed for Shonan Bellmare in July 2010 and vas was released in December 2010.
