= Rafael López =

Rafael López may refer to:

- Rafael López Gutiérrez (1855–1924), president of Honduras from 1920 to 1924
- Rafael López Nussa (1885–1943), Puerto Rican physician and public servant
- Rafael "Red" López (c.1886–1921), Mexican outlaw and revolutionary
- Rafael López Guzmán (born 1958), Spanish academic and art historian
- Rafael López Aliaga (born 1961), Peruvian businessman and politician
- Rafael López (handballer), Spanish Olympic contender
- Rafael López (illustrator and artist)
- Rafael Lopez (baseball), baseball player

== See also ==
- Rafael Lopes (disambiguation)
