= Dênis (footballer, born 1983) =

Brazilian footballer

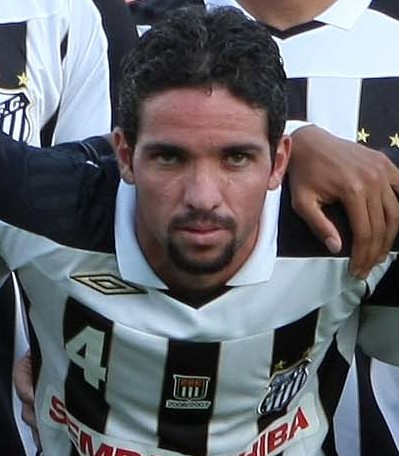
- Dênis in 2008

Personal information
- Full name: Dênis Oliveira de Souza
- Date of birth: September 21, 1983 (age 43)
- Place of birth: Ipatinga, Brazil
- Height: 1.79 m (5 ft 10 1/2 in)
- Position: Right back

Youth career
- 2000–2003: Ponte Preta

Senior career*
Years	Team	Apps	(Gls)
2004	Ponte Preta	4	(0)
2005	União Barbarense		
2005–2006	Ipatinga		
2006–2008	Santos	43	(2)
2008–2010	Corinthians		
2009	→ Avaí (loan)		
2010	→ Náutico (loan)		
2010	→ Bahia (loan)		
- * Club domestic league appearances and goals

Dênis Oliveira de Souza (born September 21, 1983 in Ipatinga), known as just Dênis, is a retired Brazilian right back.

Dênis was discovered by Santos when his team Ipatinga eliminated them from Brazil Cup on penalty shootout, in 2006. Denis was signed right after this elimination game.

He conquered the right-back spot and played well in 2006 until a knee injury knocked him out of the season. When he recovered, already in 2007, his spot was covered by new signing Pedro.

When he finally displaced Pedro (who ended up being released and joined Sporting), he injured himself again against Caracas FC. He is expected to return in 2008.

== Honours ==
- São Paulo State League: 2007

== Contract ==
- 19 May 2008 to 31 December 2008
