= David (footballer, born July 1986) =

Brazilian footballer

Personal information
- Full name: David Aparecido de Oliveira Júnior
- Date of birth: 23 July 1986 (age 40)
- Place of birth: Cândido Mota, Brazil
- Height: 1.80 m (5 ft 11 in)
- Positions: Midfielder; right-back

Youth career
- 2004–2007: São Paulo

Senior career*
Years	Team	Apps	(Gls)
2007–2012	São Paulo	5	(0)
2007	→ Mogi Mirim (loan)		
2007	→ Paulista (loan)		
2008	→ Metropolitano (loan)		
2008–2009	→ Wits (loan)		
2010	→ Rio Claro (loan)		
2010–2012	→ Wits (loan)		
2013–2014	Metropolitano		
2015–2016	Caxias		
2015	→ Campinense (loan)		
2016	CSA		
2016	Brusque		
2017	Ras Al Khaimah		
2017–2018	Novo Hamburgo		
2018	Camboriú		
2018–2019	Al-Taawon		
2020	Patrocinense		
2020	Goianésia		
2020	Ferroviário		
- * Club domestic league appearances and goals

David Aparecido de Oliveira Júnior (born 23 July 1986), simply known as David, is a Brazilian former professional footballer who played as a midfielder and right-back.

== Career ==
David started in the youth sectors of São Paulo, and began his professional career on a tour carried out by the B team in India, in 2007, alongside Hernanes for example. He was loaned out in the following years, but in 2010 he had the chance to play for the main team, against Mirassol in the 2010 Campeonato Paulista. He played in South Africa, UAE and in several clubs throughout Brazil.

David last professional club was Ferroviário AC in the 2020 Campeonato Brasileiro Série C.

== Honours ==
São Paulo B

- Super Soccer Cup (India): 2007
