= Juninho (footballer, born March 1987) =

Brazilian footballer (born 1987)

Personal information
- Full name: José Artur de Melo Júnior
- Date of birth: 7 March 1987 (age 39)
- Place of birth: São Paulo, Brazil
- Height: 1.87 m (6 ft 2 in)
- Position: Forward

Youth career
- 2000–2005: Santos

Senior career*
Years	Team	Apps	(Gls)
2006–2008	Santos	3	(1)
2007	→ Itumbiara (loan)	5	(1)
2008	→ Rio Claro (loan)	3	(0)
2009–2010	Santo André	0	(0)
2009	→ Palestra São Bernardo (loan)	23	(8)
2010	Sport Barueri	0	(0)
2011–2012	Guarani-MG	9	(1)
2013	Brasília		
2013	Lajeadense	6	(1)
2014	Catanduvense	8	(0)
2014–2015	Independente de Limeira	19	(2)
- * Club domestic league appearances and goals

José Artur de Melo Júnior (born 7 March 1987), commonly known as Juninho, is a Brazilian retired footballer who played as a forward.

He was known as Júnior until 2008.

== Biography ==
A youth product of Santos FC, Juninho signed a contract with club since 2004. He made his Campeonato Brasileiro debut on 3 December 2006 (last round), as sub, winning Santa Cruz 3–1. On 1 August 2007 he left for Itumbiara until the end of 2007 Campeonato Brasileiro Série C. He played the last 5 matches of the league stage 2, and scored a goal in the last round. Itumbiara failed to qualify for the next stage (round of 16).

In December, he left for Rio Claro until the end of 2008 Campeonato Paulista. He played 3 time that season, in round 2, 7 and 8.

On 1 May 2009 he signed a 2-year contract with Santo André but loaned to Palestra de São Bernardo of Campeonato Paulista Segunda Divisão, along with team-mate Jefferson and Cadu. They scored a total of 30 goals for the team, over half of team total, finished as losing quarter-finalists.

In July 2010 he left for Sport Barueri until the end of 2010 Copa Paulista. In January 2011 he was signed by Guarani (MG) until the end of 2011 Campeonato Mineiro.

== Honours ==
- Campeonato Paulista: 2007

== Career statistics ==
As of 11 February 2011 (round 2)

Club performance			League		Cup		League Cup		Continental		Total	
Season	Club	League	Apps	Goals	Apps	Goals	Apps	Goals	Apps	Goals	Apps	Goals
Brazil			League		Copa do Brasil		League Cup		South America		Total	
2006	Santos	Série A	1	1	0	0			0	0	1	1
2007	Santos	Série A	0	0	0	0	1	0	0	0	1	0
2007	Itumbiara	Série C	5	1							5	1
2008	Rio Claro	Regional (SP A1)					3	0			3	0
2009	Palestra St.Bernardo	Regional (SP B)					23	8			23	8
2010	Santo André	Série B	0	0			0	0			0	0
2010	Sport Barueri	Regional (SP A3)									6	1^{1}
2011	Guarani	Regional (MG I)					2	0			2	0
Career total			6	2	0	0	29	8	0	0	41	11^{1}

- Note: State leagues are marked as League Cup, statistics available only since 2007.
- ^{1} 6 games 1 goal in 2010 Copa Paulista.
