= Felipe Soares =

Brazilian footballer (born 1985)

Personal information
- Full name: Felipe Soares
- Date of birth: 22 July 1985 (age 41)
- Place of birth: Santa Rosa, Rio Grande do Sul, Brazil
- Height: 1.81 m (5 ft 11 1/2 in)
- Position: Left wing back

Team information
- Current team: FC Djursland
- Number: 8

Youth career
- 2002–2003: Internacional

Senior career*
Years	Team	Apps	(Gls)
2004–2006	Internacional	6	(0)
2005	→ Paysandu (loan)	1	(0)
2007	Standard Liège	1	(0)
2007–2008	Roeselare	22	(0)
2009–2010	Brasa	?	(?)
2009	→ Fortaleza (loan)	?	(?)
2009–2010	→ Mirassol (loan)	?	(?)
2011	Inter de Santa Maria	?	(?)
2011	Nacional (AM)	?	(?)
2012–2013	Esportivo Bento Gonçalves	?	(?)
2013	Lajeadense	?	(?)
2013–2016	Novo Hamburgo	?	(?)
2016–	FC Djursland	?	(?)
- * Club domestic league appearances and goals

Felipe Soares (born 22 July 1985), is a Brazilian footballer who plays as a left wingback for Danish fourth tier club FC Djursland.

== Biography ==
In December 2006 he was signed by Standard along with Frederico Burgel Xavier and Marcos Camozzato. Internacional received a combined R$909,954 transfer fee, half of them was paid for Soares. In August 2007 he was signed by Roeselare along with Serhiy Kovalenko and Gabriel N'Galula, all offered 2-year contract.

Felipe returned to Brazil in January 2009 and signed a 4-year contract for Brasa, a proxy for Energy Sports.

Felipe Soares signed a contract until 30 November for Fortaleza in March 2009. However, in August 2009 his contract was terminated and Felipe left for Mirassol in 1-year deal. Mirassol participated in 2009 Campeonato Brasileiro Série D and 2010 Campeonato Paulista. Mirassol was a partner of Energy Sports until 2010. He was released by Brasa in July 2010.

In January 2011 Felipe was signed by Rio Grande do Sul club, Internacional de de Santa Maria.

In March 2011 Felipe was signed by Nacional Futebol Clube of Amazon until the end of 2011 Campeonato Amazonense. In January 2012 Felipe was signed by Esportivo de Bento Gonçalves in 1 1/2-year deal.

== Honours ==
- Campeonato Gaúcho: 2004, 2005.
