= Cléber Santana =

Brazilian footballer (1981–2016)

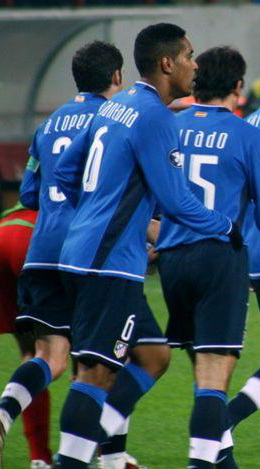
- Santana playing for Atlético Madrid in 2007

Personal information
- Full name: Cléber Santana Loureiro
- Date of birth: 27 June 1981
- Place of birth: Abreu e Lima, Brazil
- Date of death: 28 November 2016 (aged 35)
- Place of death: La Unión, Colombia
- Height: 1.87 m (6 ft 1 1/2 in)
- Position: Midfielder

Youth career
- Sport Recife

Senior career*
Years	Team	Apps	(Gls)
1999–2003	Sport Recife	47	(5)
2004	Vitória	39	(4)
2005	Kashiwa Reysol	29	(8)
2006–2007	Santos	72	(17)
2007–2010	Atlético Madrid	37	(1)
2008–2009	→ Mallorca (loan)	32	(5)
2010–2012	São Paulo	40	(3)
2011	→ Atlético Paranaense (loan)	30	(3)
2012	→ Avaí (loan)	40	(15)
2012	→ Flamengo (loan)	12	(1)
2013	Flamengo	10	(3)
2013–2014	Avaí	66	(13)
2014–2015	Criciúma	41	(4)
2015–2016	Chapecoense	81	(3)
Total		577	(85)
- * Club domestic league appearances and goals

Cléber Santana Loureiro (27 June 1981 – 28 November 2016) was a Brazilian professional footballer who played as a central midfielder.

He won state championships with Sport, Vitória, Santos and Avaí. He also had spells abroad, with Kashiwa Reysol in Japan and Atlético Madrid and Mallorca in Spain.

Santana was the captain of the Chapecoense team aboard LaMia Flight 2933 that crashed, killing him and 70 others.

== Football career ==
Born in Abreu e Lima, Pernambuco, Santana started playing professionally with Sport Club do Recife. He then went on to represent in Brazil Esporte Clube Vitória and Santos FC, punctuated by a stint with J1 League's Kashiwa Reysol in 2005.

In July 2007, Santana was signed from Santos by Atlético Madrid, on a three-year contract worth €6 million. Although not an undisputed starter, he still contributed with 23 league matches as the Colchoneros returned to the UEFA Champions League after a 12-year hiatus, being played mostly after Maniche's loan departure to Inter Milan in January 2008.

For the 2008–09 season, Santana was loaned to fellow La Liga club RCD Mallorca. On 9 November 2008 he scored his first goal for the Balearic Islands team, in a 3–3 home draw against Athletic Bilbao, and finished the campaign (in which he featured heavily, alongside another player loaned by Atlético, José Manuel Jurado) with five, which also included the 2–1 winner against already crowned champions FC Barcelona on 17 May 2009, and a solo effort the following week, a 3–1 triumph at Real Madrid.

Cléber then returned to Atlético, being used sparingly but managing to net in a 2–2 home draw against UD Almería, on 23 September 2009. In late January of the following year, even though he had renewed his contract until June 2012, he returned to his country, signing with São Paulo FC.

On 21 September 2012, Santana was announced at Clube de Regatas do Flamengo, claiming the team could "not afford to think about relegation" even though it was playing below the general expectations – going on to finish in 11th position. He signed a two-year contract, and the Rio de Janeiro side bought 70% of his rights; he scored on his official debut two days later, against Atlético Clube Goianiense for the Série A.

In the following years, Santana represented Avaí Futebol Clube in the Série B, Criciúma Esporte Clube in that level and also Série A and Associação Chapecoense de Futebol in the top division. He captained the latter, helping the Santa Catarina-based team to the finals of the 2016 Copa Sudamericana.

== Death ==
On 28 November 2016, whilst travelling with Chapecoense to the aforementioned finals, 35-year-old Santana was among the fatalities of the LaMia Flight 2933 accident in the Colombian village of Cerro Gordo, La Unión, Antioquia.

== Career statistics ==
Club	Season	League			State League		Cup		Continental		Other		Total	
Club	Season	Division	Apps	Goals	Apps	Goals	Apps	Goals	Apps	Goals	Apps	Goals	Apps	Goals
Kashiwa Reysol	2005	J1 League	30	8	—		5	2	—		—		35	10
Santos	2006	Série A	29	2	17	3	7	3	3 (Note: Appearance(s) in Copa Sudamericana)	0	—		56	8
Santos	2007	Série A	6	1	20	11	—		14 (Note: Appearance(s) in Copa Libertadores)	3	—		40	15
Santos	Total		35	3	37	14	7	3	17	3	—		96	23
Atlético Madrid	2007–08	La Liga	23	0	—		6	0	9 (Note: Appearance(s) in UEFA Cup)	0	—		38	0
Atlético Madrid	2008–09	La Liga	0	0	—		0	0	0	0	—		0	0
Atlético Madrid	2009–10	La Liga	14	1	—		3	0	8 (Note: Appearance(s) in UEFA Champions League)	0	—		25	1
Atlético Madrid	Total		37	1	—		9	0	17	0	—		63	1
Mallorca	2008–09	La Liga	32	5	—		8	1	—		—		40	6
São Paulo	2010	Série A	22	2	12	1	—		8	0	—		42	3
São Paulo	2011	Série A	0	0	6	0	0	0	—		—		6	0
São Paulo	Total		22	2	18	1	0	0	8	0	—		48	3
Atlético Paranaense	2011	Série A	30	3	—		—		1	0	—		31	3
Avaí	2012	Série B	24	8	16	7	—		—		—		40	15
Flamengo	2012	Série A	12	1	—		—		—		—		12	1
Flamengo	2013	Série A	0	0	10	3	1	0	—		—		11	3
Flamengo	Total		12	1	10	3	1	0	—		—		23	4
Avaí	2013	Série B	33	7	—		—		—		—		33	7
Avaí	2014	Série B	16	1	17	5	5	1	—		—		38	7
Avaí	Total		49	8	17	5	5	1	—		—		71	14
Criciúma	2014	Série A	20	1	—		—		1	0	—		21	1
Criciúma	2015	Série B	7	1	14	2	1	0	—		—		22	3
Criciúma	Total		27	2	14	2	1	0	1	0	—		43	4
Chapecoense	2015	Série A	26	1	—		—		4	0	—		30	1
Chapecoense	2016	Série A	36	0	19	2	3	1	7	0	—		65	3
Chapecoense	Total		62	1	19	2	3	1	11	0	—		95	4
Career total			360	42	131	34	39	8	55	3	0	0	585	87

== Honours ==
Sport

- Copa Nordeste: 2000
- Campeonato Pernambucano: 2000

Vitória

- Campeonato Baiano: 2004

Santos

- Campeonato Paulista: 2006, 2007

Atlético Madrid

- UEFA Intertoto Cup: 2007
- Copa del Rey: Runner-up 2009–10

Avaí

- Campeonato Catarinense: 2012

Chapecoense

- Copa Sudamericana: 2016 (posthumously)
- Campeonato Catarinense: 2016
