= Adoniran =

Brazilian footballer (born 1985)

Personal information
- Full name: Adoniran Vinícius de Campos
- Date of birth: 12 December 1985 (age 40)
- Place of birth: Santa Bárbara d'Oeste, Brazil
- Height: 1.72 m (5 ft 8 in)
- Position: Defensive midfielder

Youth career
- 2004–2005: São Bento

Senior career*
Years	Team	Apps	(Gls)
2006	União Barbarense		
2007	Ituano		
2007–2008	Santos	19	(0)
2009	Linense		
2009	Paraná	30	(2)
2010	Sertãozinho		
2010–2011	Ituano		
2012	Guarani		
2013	Operário		
2013–2014	América-SP		
2014–2015	Paranavaí		
- * Club domestic league appearances and goals

Adoniran Vinícius de Campos (born 12 December 1985 in Santa Bárbara d'Oeste), or simply Adoniran, is a Brazilian defensive midfielder. He last played for Paranavaí.

== Career ==
In May 2009, he was signed by Paraná.
