= Carlinhos (footballer, born 1987) =

Brazilian footballer

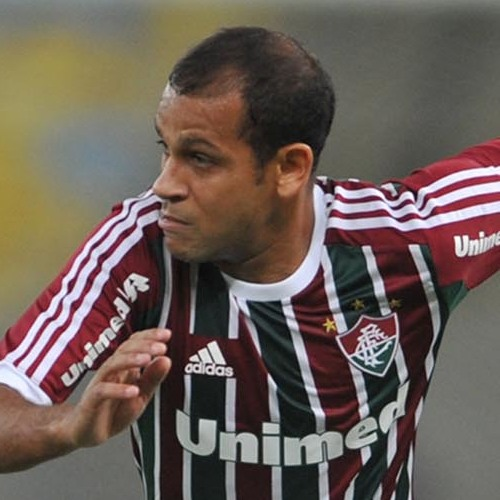

Personal information
- Full name: Carlos Andrade Souza
- Date of birth: 23 January 1987 (age 39)
- Place of birth: Vitória da Conquista, Brazil
- Height: 1.75 m (5 ft 9 in)
- Position: Left back

Youth career
- 2004: Santos

Senior career*
Years	Team	Apps	(Gls)
2005–2009	Santos	54	(4)
2008	→ Cruzeiro (loan)	9	(0)
2009	→ Mirassol (loan)	3	(0)
2010	Santo André	18	(0)
2010–2014	Fluminense	187	(9)
2015–2016	São Paulo	50	(2)
2017	Internacional	15	(0)
2018	Paysandu	6	(0)
2019	CSA	29	(2)
2021–2022	Maringá	0	(0)

International career
2007	Brazil U20	7	(0)
2006–2012	Brazil	1	(0)
- * Club domestic league appearances and goals

Carlos Andrade Souza (born 23 January 1987), known as Carlinhos, is a Brazilian former footballer.

== Biography ==
Carlinhos started his career at Santos. His contract was due to expired in August 2008 but in June 2008 signed a new 3-year contract and joined Cruzeiro in a 6-month deal. In January 2009 he was signed by fellow São Paulo State club Mirassol in a 5-month loan. Carlinhos then sold to Brasa Futebol Clube for R$400,000 in 2009, a proxy club for third parties ownership. In December 2009 he was signed by Santo André in 1-year contract. In May 2010 Carlinhos was signed by Fluminense in 3-year deal.

=== National team ===
Carlinhos was called for Seleção for the first time in 2006, by Dunga, for a friendly against Switzerland. He returned to the national team six years later, in 2012, when, this time by Mano Menezes, was called up for Superclásico de las Américas. He made his debut for Brazil national football team on November 21, 2012, when Seleção won, after penalties, the title.

Additionally, Carlinhos was placed in the preliminary squad for the 2008 Summer Olympics, but eventually was not called for the final list of the tournament by coach Dunga.

Games for Brazilian team

	Date	Place	Result	Opponent	Goals	Competition
1.	21 November 2012	La Bombonera, Buenos Aires, Argentina	1(4)–2(3)	Argentina	0	Superclásico de las Américas

== Honours ==
=== Club ===
Santos

- São Paulo State League: 2006, 2007

Fluminense

- Campeonato Brasileiro Série A: 2010, 2012
- Rio de Janeiro State League: 2012

=== International ===
- South American Championship (U 20): 2007
- Superclásico de las Américas: 2012

=== Individual ===
- Campeonato Brasileiro Série A Team of the Year: 2012
