= Palestra de São Bernardo =

Palestra
- Full name: Palestra de São Bernardo
- Nickname(s): PSB; Colosso Alviverde
- Founded: 1 September 1935; 90 years ago
- Ground: Baetão
- Capacity: 6,315
- 2011: Paulistão 2ª Divisão, 41st of 44
Home colours	Away colours

Palestra de São Bernardo, commonly known as Palestra, is a currently inactive Brazilian football club based in São Bernardo do Campo, São Paulo.

They have a long-standing rivalry with nearby club EC São Bernardo, with whom they contest the Clássico Batateiro.

== History ==
The club was founded on 1 September 1935 by the São Bernardo do Campo Italian community.

== Stadium ==
Palestra de São Bernardo play their home games at Estádio Humberto de Alencar Castelo Branco, nicknamed Baetão. The stadium has a maximum capacity of 6,315 people.
