= Marcos Aurélio (footballer, born 1984) =

Brazilian footballer

Personal information
- Full name: Marcos Aurélio de Oliveira Lima
- Date of birth: 10 February 1984 (age 42)
- Place of birth: Cuiabá, Brazil
- Height: 1.67 m (5 ft 6 in)
- Position: Striker

Team information
- Current team: Botafogo-PB

Senior career*
Years	Team	Apps	(Gls)
2001–2004	União Barbarense		
2005	ECUS	0	(0)
2005	→ Vila Nova (loan)	0	(0)
2005	→ Ituano (loan)	0	(0)
2006	Bragantino	0	(0)
2006	→ Atlético Paranaense (loan)	20	(10)
2007	Santos	33	(7)
2008	Brasa	0	(0)
2008	→ Shimizu S-Pulse (loan)	9	(0)
2009–2011	Coritiba	88	(26)
2012–2014	Internacional	12	(0)
2013	→ Sport Recife (loan)	35	(22)
2014	→ Jeonbuk Hyundai Motors (loan)	5	(0)
2014	→ Bahia (loan)	13	(1)
2015	Ceará	2	(0)
2015	Coritiba	9	(1)
2016	CRB	8	(0)
2017	Luverdense	11	(4)
2018–2019	Botafogo PB	28	(6)
2018	→ Sampaio Corrêa (loan)	4	(0)
2020	Brasiliense	0	(0)
- * Club domestic league appearances and goals as of 22:18, 18 March 2020 (UTC)

Marcos Aurélio de Oliveira Lima (born 10 February 1984), known as Marcos Aurélio, is a Brazilian footballer, who plays as a forward for Altos-PI.

== Club career ==
=== Third-party ownership era ===
Marcos Aurélio was signed by Esporte Clube União Suzano on 1 January 2005 in 5-year contract, a proxy for investor. He left for Vila Nova Futebol Clube in 10-month deal in March 2005. In May 2005 he was signed by Ituano.

In the next season he left for Clube Atlético Bragantino in 1-year deal. In April 2006 he was signed by Atlético Paranaense in temporary deal after Bragantino acquired him definitely (but still shared the rights on the players with the "agent" of Aurélio) and extended the contract with Bragantino to last until April 2008.

Santos signed him in 1-year deal in 2007. However Atlético Paranaense also sued to court to claim the damages as the club had automatic renewal clause with Bragantino.

In 2008 Aurélio played for Shimizu S-Pulse, on loan from third-party owner Energy Empreend e Participações (Energy Sports). Santos sold the player's rights to Energy Sports for R$ 1,053,000.

=== Coritiba ===
In 2009 Aurélio returned to Brazil and signed a 3-year contract with Brasa Futebol Clube, the subsidiary of Energy Sports. He also immediately left for Coritiba in 2-year loan. In January 2011 Coritiba acquired Aurélio definitely and extended the contract to 31 December 2012.

=== Internacional ===
In January 2012 he was signed by Sport Club Internacional.

== Honours ==
União Barbarense

- Campeonato Brasileiro Série C: 2004

Vila Nova

- Campeonato Goiano: 2005

Santos

- Campeonato Paulista: 2007

Coritiba

- Campeonato Paranaense: 2010, 2011
- Campeonato Brasileiro Série B: 2010

Internacional

- Campeonato Gaúcho: 2012

Ceará

- Copa do Nordeste: 2015

Luverdense

- Copa Verde: 2017
