= Rodrigo Souto =

Brazilian footballer

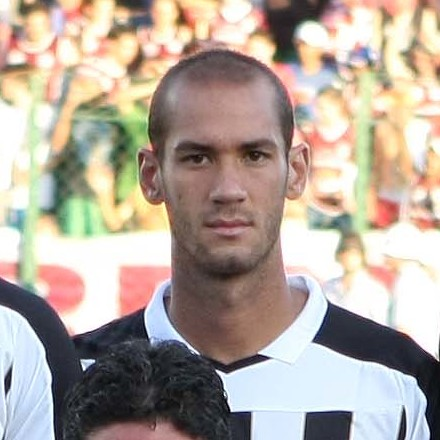
- Souto in 2008.

Personal information
- Full name: Rodrigo Ribeiro Souto
- Date of birth: September 9, 1983 (age 43)
- Place of birth: Rio de Janeiro, Brazil
- Height: 1.83 m (6 ft 0 in)
- Position: Defensive midfielder

Youth career
- 1998–1999: São Cristóvão

Senior career*
Years	Team	Apps	(Gls)
1999–2000	São Cristóvão	0	(0)
2000–2004	Vasco da Gama	78	(5)
2005–2006	Atlético Paranaense	0	(0)
2005–2006	→ Figueirense (loan)	52	(1)
2007–2009	Santos	93	(7)
2010–2011	São Paulo	35	(0)
2011–2012	Júbilo Iwata		
2013	Náutico		
2013	Figueirense		
2014	Botafogo		
2015	Penapolense		
2016–2018	Resende		
2018	Olaria		
- * Club domestic league appearances and goals

Rodrigo Ribeiro Souto (born September 9, 1983) is a retired Brazilian footballer who played as a defensive midfielder. He has previously played for several Brazilian clubs as well as in Japan.

== Playing career ==
Born in Rio de Janeiro, Rodrigo was a product of São Cristóvão youth (along with others such as Brazilian superstar forward Ronaldo). He earned a transfer to Vasco da Gama at only 17 years of age. Souto built his career in Vasco, initially playing as a defensive midfielder. However, the team back then put many players in that position on the lineup, and so Rodrigo was able to show his attacking skills. He then began to be deployed as a right attacking midfielder.

In such position, he made a move to Atlético Paranaense. Although he conquered Paraná State League in 2005, he did not establish himself as a regular and, after six months, switched clubs again, this time to Figueirense. There he again won the State league and again was deployed as a defensive midfielder, and even as a right back or sweeper in emergencies.

=== Santos ===
Souto's performance at Figueirense in 2006 earned him a transfer to Santos where he made a solid pairing with Chilean international, Claudio Maldonado. He was once again State League champion in 2007, with a really high grade on the final game. He had a great year with Santos in 2007, also finishing 2nd in the Série A.

In 2008, Santos did not perform well in all competitions but Souto continued as a first-choice player in the midfield. In 2009 Santos improved and Souto played well in the beginning of the Série A, scoring two headed goals against Goiás in the first round of the League. Santos however could not qualify for the Copa Libertadores of 2010.

=== São Paulo ===
Souto moved to São Paulo from Santos in 2010, as a deal with midfielder Arouca. He fit well into the squad and played good matches for São Paulo.

=== Retirement ===
In September 2018 it was confirmed, that Souto had decided to retire.

== Honours ==
Vasco da Gama

- Rio de Janeiro State League: 2003

Atlético Paranaense

- Paraná State League: 2005

Figueirense

- Santa Catarina State League: 2006

Santos

- São Paulo State League: 2007
