= Dias d'Ávila =

Municipality of Bahia, Brazil

- Municipality
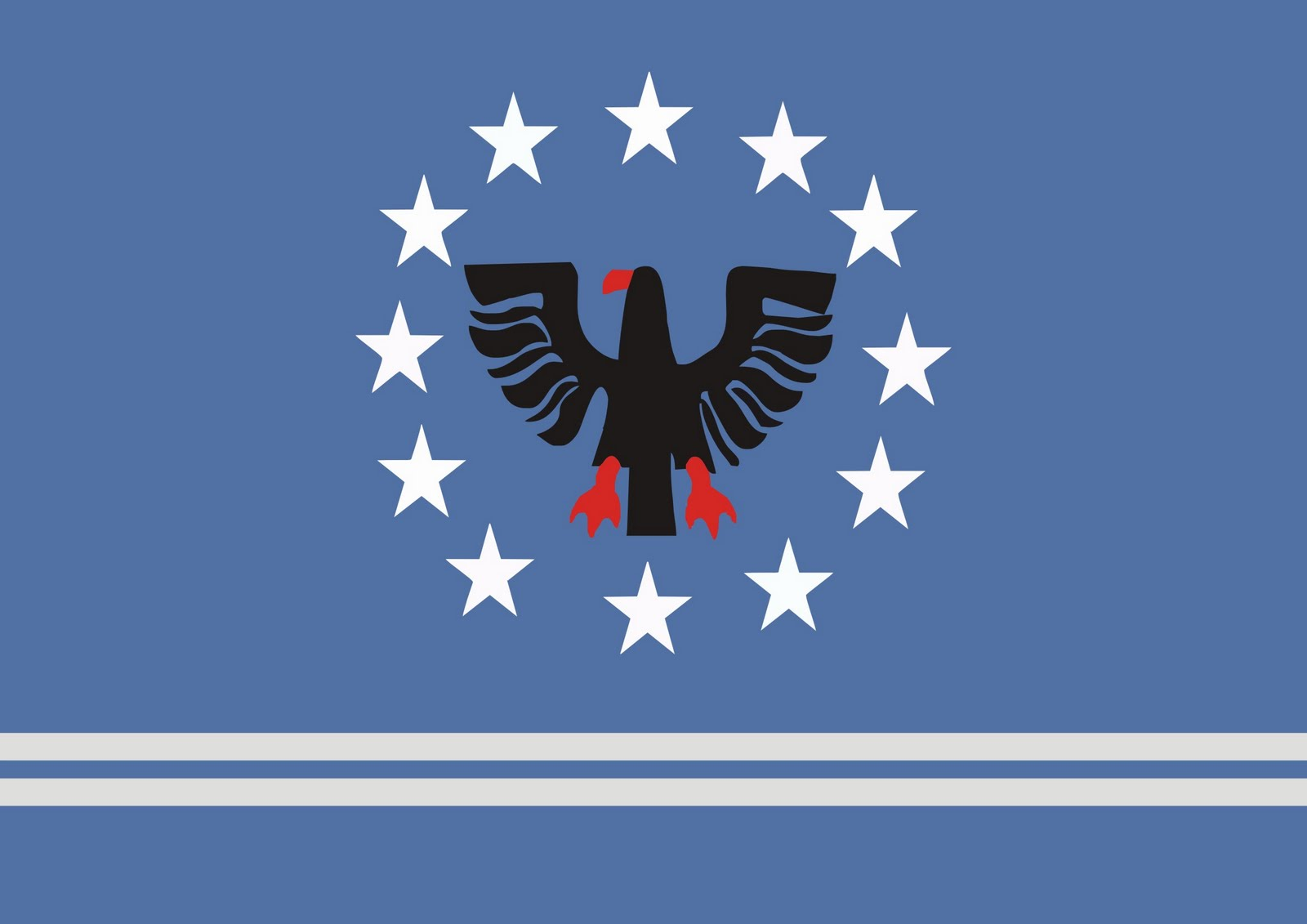
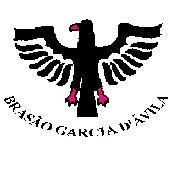
- Flag Seal

- Location in Brazil
- Coordinates: 12.6128°S 38.2969°W
- Country: Brazil
- Region: Nordeste
- State: Bahia

Government
  - Mayor: Alberto Castro

Area
  - Total: 184.23 km^{2} (71.13 sq mi)

Population (2020)
  - Total: 82,432
  - Density: 447.44/km^{2} (1,158.9/sq mi)
- Time zone: UTC−3 (BRT)
- Post code: 42850
- Website: diasdavila.ba.gov.br

Dias d'Ávila is a municipality in the state of Bahia in the North-East region of Brazil. Its population in 2020 was 82,432.

== See also ==
- List of municipalities in Bahia
