= Rafael Lopes (Brazilian footballer) =

Brazilian footballer (born 1986)

Personal information
- Full name: Rafael Lopes Ferreira
- Date of birth: September 29, 1986 (age 40)
- Place of birth: Parauapebas, Brazil
- Height: 1.77 m (5 ft 10 in)
- Position: Right back

Team information
- Current team: Águia de Marabá

Youth career
- 2001–2004: Atlético-PR
- 2005–2007: São Paulo

Senior career*
| Years | Team | Apps | (Gls) |
| 2008–2011 | São Paulo | 4 | (0) |
| 2009 | → Toledo (loan) | | |
| 2009 | → Santo André (loan) | | |
| 2010 | → Rio Branco-SP (loan) | | |
| 2010 | → Fortaleza (loan) | | |
| 2011 | → Corinthians Alagoano (loan) | | |
| 2012 | Ypiranga | | |
| 2013– | Águia de Marabá | 2 | (0) |
- * Club domestic league appearances and goals as of June 26, 2013

Rafael Lopes Ferreira or simply Rafael Lopes (born September 29, 1986 in Parauapebas), is a Brazilian right back. He currently plays for Águia de Marabá.

== Title ==
São Paulo

- Brazilian League: 1

2008
