= 2007 Campeonato Paulista =

Campeonato Paulista - Série A1
- Season: 2007
- Champions: Santos (17th title)
- Relegated: América; São Bento; Rio Branco; Santo André
- Matches: 202
- Goals: 603 (2.99 per match)
- Top goalscorer: Somália (13)
- Average attendance: the

The 2007 Campeonato Paulista|Campeonato Paulista de Futebol Profissional da Primeira Divisão - Série A1 was the 106th edition of São Paulo's top professional football league. The competition began on 17 January and ended on 22 April, with the finals, and was held at the Morumbi in São Paulo. Santos successfully defended its 16th title to add to its cache the 2007 Cam 17th title and 2nd consecutive after a 2–2 aggregate score in the finals against São Caetano. As Santos had the best campaign in the first phase, they were crowned champions. This season marked the return of the Campeonato do Interior (Interior Championship), where the clubs from the countryside of the state of São Paulo that did not qualify to the knockout phase would contest among themselves to determine the champion club from the countryside.

== First phase ==
=== League table ===
Pos	Team	Pld	W	D	L	GF	GA	GD	Pts	Qualification or relegation
1	Santos	19	16	2	1	45	19	+26	50	Advanced to the Semi-finals
2	São Paulo	19	13	5	1	41	14	+27	44	Advanced to the Semi-finals
3	São Caetano	19	11	3	5	32	22	+10	36	Advanced to the Semi-finals
4	Bragantino	19	10	5	4	35	17	+18	35	Advanced to the Semi-finals
5	Palmeiras	19	10	5	4	39	25	+14	35	
6	Paulista	19	9	4	6	34	31	+3	31	
7	Noroeste	19	9	3	7	38	30	+8	30	
8	Ponte Preta	19	9	3	7	29	24	+5	30	
9	Corinthians	19	8	5	6	35	27	+8	29	
10	Guaratinguetá	19	7	4	8	29	26	+3	25	
11	Ituano	19	7	4	8	22	25	−3	25	
12	Rio Claro	19	5	7	7	23	31	−8	22	
13	Juventus-SP	19	6	2	11	18	31	−13	20	
14	Marília	19	5	5	9	29	30	−1	20	
15	Barueri	19	6	1	12	24	40	−16	19	
16	Sertãozinho	19	4	7	8	22	33	−11	19	
17	América-SP	19	4	5	10	22	36	−14	17	Relegated to the Série A2
18	São Bento	19	4	4	11	27	48	−21	16	Relegated to the Série A2
19	Rio Branco-SP	19	3	4	12	18	40	−22	13	Relegated to the Série A2
20	Santo André	27	2	4	21	40	37	+3	10	Relegated to the Série A2

Updated to match(es) played on 11 April 2007. Source: UOL Esporte
Rules for classification: 1st points; 2nd goal difference; 3rd number of goals scored

=== Results ===
Home \ Away	AME	BAR	BRG	COR	GTG	ITU	JUV	MAC	NOR	PAL	PTA	PON	RBR	RCL	STA	SAN	SBE	SCA	SPA	SER
América-SP																				
Barueri																1:2				
Bragantino																				
Corinthians												3:1								
Guaratinguetá																				
Ituano			1:1																	
Juventus-SP													3:0							
Marília															3:0					
Noroeste																	4:2			
Palmeiras											4:2									
Paulista																				
Ponte Preta																				
Rio Branco-SP	1:0																			
Rio Claro																				
Santo André																				
Santos																				
São Bento																				
São Caetano					2:0															
São Paulo																				
Sertãozinho																			1:3	

Updated to match(es) played on 11 April 2012. Source: Futpédia
Legend: Blue = home team win; Yellow = draw; Red = away team win.

== Knockout phase ==
=== Bracket ===
Semi-finals
1	Santos	0	0	0
4	Bragantino	0	0	0
2	São Paulo	1	1	2
3	São Caetano	1	4	5

Finals
1	Santos	0	2	2
3	São Caetano	2	0	2

=== Semi-finals ===
Team 1	Agg.	Team 2	1st leg	2nd leg
Santos (Brazil)	0–0	(Brazil) Bragantino	0–0	0–0
São Paulo (Brazil)	2–5	(Brazil) São Caetano	1–1	1–4

=== Finals ===
Team 1	Agg.	Team 2	1st leg	2nd leg
Santos (Brazil)	2–2	(Brazil) São Caetano	0–2	2–0

== Campeonato do Interior ==
=== Bracket ===
Semi-finals
6	Paulista	0	1	1
10	Guaratinguetá	1	2	3
7	Noroeste	2	1	3
8	Ponte Preta	1	1	2

Finals
10	Guaratinguetá	1	1	2
7	Noroeste	1	0	1

=== Semi-finals ===
Team 1	Agg.	Team 2	1st leg	2nd leg
Paulista (Brazil)	1–3	(Brazil) Guaratinguetá	0–1	1–2
Noroeste (Brazil)	3–2	(Brazil) Ponte Preta	2–1	1–1

=== Finals ===
Team 1	Agg.	Team 2	1st leg	2nd leg
Guaratinguetá (Brazil)	2–1	(Brazil) Noroeste	1–1	1–0

== Top scorers ==
Rank	Name	Club	Goals
1	(Brazil) Somália	São Caetano	13
2	(Brazil) Edmundo	Palmeiras	12
2	(Brazil) Finazzi	Ponte Preta	12
3	(Brazil) Edno	Noroeste	11
3	(Brazil) Cléber Santana	Santos	11
4	(Brazil) Sorato	Ituano	10
5	(Brazil) Marcos Denner	Paulista	9
6	(Brazil) Alex Afonso	Bragantino	8
6	(Brazil) Thiago Humberto	Grêmio Barueri	8
6	(Brazil) Osmar	Palmeiras	8
6	(Brazil) Gílson	Paulista	8
6	(Brazil) Roberto Santos	São Bento	8

== See also ==
- Copa Paulista de Futebol
- Campeonato Paulista Série A2
- Campeonato Paulista Série A3
- Campeonato Paulista Segunda Divisão
