= Díonísio (footballer, born 1988) =

Brazilian footballer

Personal information
- Full name: Díonísio de Oliveira Alves
- Date of birth: 18 January 1988 (age 38)
- Place of birth: São Bernardo do Campo, Brazil
- Height: 1.69 m (5 ft 7 in)
- Position: Defensive midfielder

Youth career
- 2005–2006: Santos

Senior career*
Years	Team	Apps	(Gls)
2007–2010	Santos	20	(0)
2009	→ Oeste (loan)	12	(0)
2009	→ Santo André (loan)	11	(0)
2010	→ Oeste (loan)	2	(0)
2010–2016	Oeste	40	(0)
2011	→ Ponte Preta (loan)	2	(0)
2011	→ Paraná (loan)	3	(0)
2012	→ Grêmio Barueri (loan)	12	(0)
2017	Barretos	9	(0)
- * Club domestic league appearances and goals as of 19:37, 2 January 2020 (UTC)

Díonísio de Oliveira Alves (born 18 January 1988), simply known as Díonísio, is a Brazilian retired footballer who played as a defensive midfielder.

== Honours ==
Santos

- Campeonato Paulista: 2007
