= Pedro Silva (Brazilian footballer) =

Brazilian footballer

Personal information
- Full name: Pedro Alves da Silva
- Date of birth: 25 April 1981 (age 45)
- Place of birth: Brasília, Brazil
- Height: 1.80 m (5 ft 11 in)
- Position: Right-back

Youth career
- 1997–2001: Palmeiras

Senior career*
| Years | Team | Apps | (Gls) |
| 2002–2006 | Palmeiras | 3 | (0) |
| 2003 | → Figueirense (loan) | 16 | (2) |
| 2004 | → Vitória (loan) | 26 | (1) |
| 2005 | → Internacional (loan) | 5 | (0) |
| 2005–2006 | → Académica (loan) | 21 | (1) |
| 2006–2007 | Iraty | 0 | (0) |
| 2007 | → Santos (loan) | 0 | (0) |
| 2007 | → Corinthians (loan) | 8 | (0) |
| 2007–2011 | Sporting CP | 24 | (1) |
| 2010–2011 | → Portimonense (loan) | 21 | (2) |
| 2012 | Novo Hamburgo | 14 | (0) |
| 2012 | ABC | 22 | (1) |
| 2013 | ASA | 9 | (1) |
| 2014 | CSA | 9 | (2) |
| Total | | 178 | (11) |

Managerial career
- 2014–2018: Portimonense (assistant)
- * Club domestic league appearances and goals

Pedro Alves da Silva (born 25 April 1981) is a Brazilian retired footballer who played as a right-back.

== Club career ==
Silva was born in Brasília, Federal District. During his early Brazilian career he represented SE Palmeiras, Figueirense FC and Esporte Clube Vitória (the latter two on loan). He was loaned to Sport Club Internacional in 2005, then had his first experience abroad with Portuguese club Académica de Coimbra.

In October 2006, Silva was signed by Iraty Sport Club, with his rights being de facto controlled by an investment company. He was subsequently loaned to Santos FC and Sport Club Corinthians Paulista.

Moving abroad again, Silva joined another Portuguese side, Sporting CP, for €350,000. Severely injured in his first season, he eventually won the battle for first-choice status with veteran Abel midway through 2008–09, with both sharing duties the following campaign.

On 21 March 2009, Silva started in the final of the Taça da Liga against Lisbon neighbours S.L. Benfica (1–1 after 90 minutes). In the 72nd minute of the game, a controversial penalty kick was awarded and he was sent off for a second bookable offence; after the eventual penalty shootout loss the player refused to hang up his runner-up medal, throwing it onto the pitch immediately.

In August 2009, Sporting acquired the remaining 50% of Silva's rights from Iraty by selling Rodrigo Tiuí's 50% to the investment group. On 30 August 2010, after being second or third-choice in 2009–10, he was loaned to Portimonense SC.

Silva's contract with Sporting was terminated in late 2011. On 10 December, he returned to his country and joined lowly Esporte Clube Novo Hamburgo.

== Honours ==
Vitória

- Campeonato Baiano: 2004

Internacional

- Campeonato Gaúcho: 2005

Sporting CP

- Supertaça Cândido de Oliveira: 2007
- Taça da Liga runner-up: 2008–09
