= 2009 Santos FC season =

Santos 2009 football season

Santos
2009 season
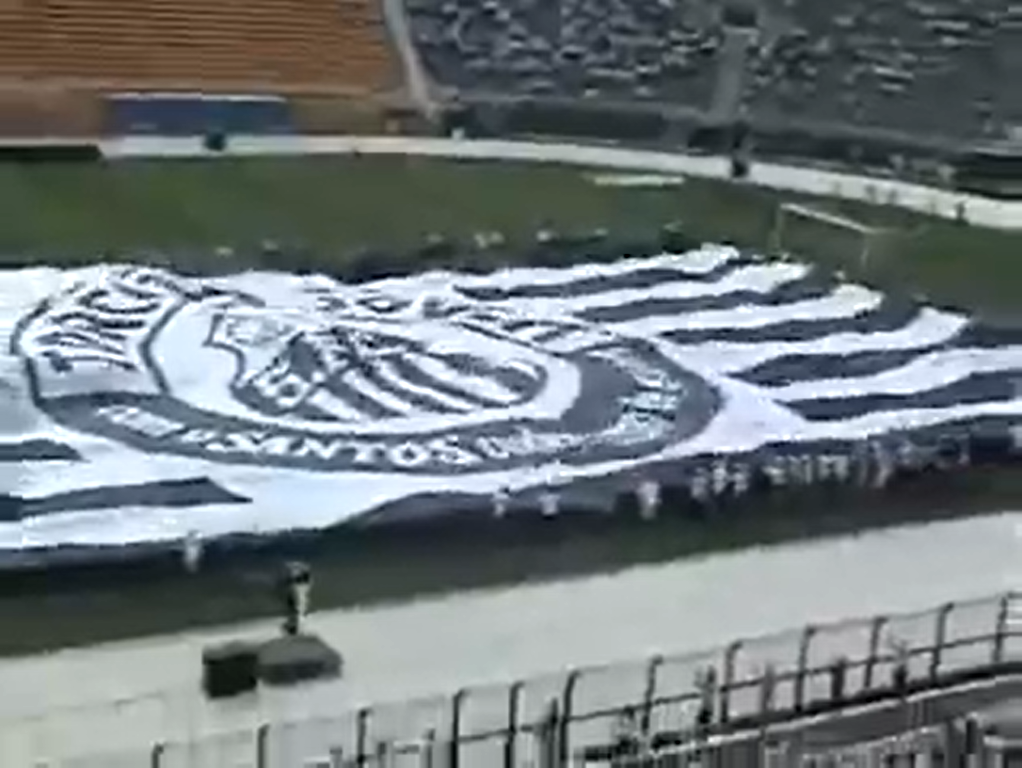
- A Santos flag in the field of the Pacaembu Stadium before a friendly match against Portuguesa Santista
- President: Marcelo Teixeira
- Coach: Márcio Fernandes (until 13 February); Vagner Mancini (until 13 July); Vanderlei Luxemburgo (from 17 July)
- Campeonato Brasileiro: 12th
- Campeonato Paulista: Runners-up
- Copa do Brasil: Second stage
- Top goalscorer: League: Kléber Pereira (14); All: Kléber Pereira (28)
- Highest home attendance: 23,673 vs Vitória (12 October)
- Lowest home attendance: 3,191 vs Guarani (15 February)
Home colours	Away colours	Third colours

The 2009 season was Santos Futebol Clube's ninety-seventh season in existence and the club's fifty consecutive season in the top flight of Brazilian football.

== Players ==
=== Squad information ===
Note: Flags indicate national team as defined under FIFA eligibility rules; some limited exceptions apply. Players may hold more than one non-FIFA nationality.

No.	Pos.	Nation	Player
—	GK	BRA	Douglas
—	GK	BRA	Rafael
—	GK	BRA	Fábio Costa
—	GK	BRA	Felipe
—	GK	BRA	Sérgio
—	DF	BRA	Adaílton
—	DF	BRA	André Astorga
—	DF	BRA	Edu Dracena
—	DF	BRA	Eli Sabiá
—	DF	BRA	Fabão
—	DF	BRA	Paulo Henrique Rodrigues
—	DF	BRA	George Lucas
—	DF	BRA	Léo
—	DF	BRA	Luizinho
—	DF	BRA	Pará
—	DF	BRA	Triguinho

No.	Pos.	Nation	Player
—	DF	BRA	Wagner Diniz
—	MF	BRA	Alan Patrick
—	MF	BRA	Germano
—	MF	BRA	Madson
—	MF	BRA	Ganso
—	MF	BRA	Róbson
—	MF	BRA	Rodrigo Mancha
—	MF	BRA	Rodrigo Souto
—	FW	BRA	André
—	FW	BRA	Fabiano
—	FW	BRA	Felipe Azevedo
—	FW	BRA	Gil
—	FW	BRA	Kléber Pereira
—	FW	BRA	Jean Carlos
—	FW	BRA	Maikon Leite
—	FW	BRA	Neymar

=== Appearances and goals ===
Pos.	Name	Campeonato Brasileiro		Campeonato Paulista		Copa do Brasil		Total	
Pos.	Name	Apps	Goals	Apps	Goals	Apps	Goals	Apps	Goals
GK	(Brazil) Douglas	7(1)	0	1	0	1	0	9	0
GK	(Brazil) Fabio Costa	6	0	22	0	3	0	31	0
GK	(Brazil) Felipe	25	0	0	0	0	0	25	0
DF	(Brazil) Adaílton	7	0	8	0	0	0	15	0
DF	(Brazil) André Astorga	6(3)	0	1	0	2	0	12	0
DF	(Brazil) Edu Dracena	1(1)	0	0	0	0	0	2	0
DF	(Brazil) Eli Sabiá	22	1	0	0	0	0	22	1
DF	(Brazil) Fabão	25	1	15	2	3	0	43	3
DF	(Brazil) Paulo Henrique Rodrigues	1(2)	0	3(2)	1	1	0	9	1
DF	(Brazil) George Lucas	9	0	0	0	0	0	9	0
DF	(Brazil) Luizinho	9(5)	1	17(1)	0	2(1)	0	35	1
DF	(Brazil) Pará	24(8)	0	8(9)	0	4	0	53	0
DF	(Brazil) Wagner Diniz	5(1)	0	0	0	0	0	6	0
DF	(Brazil) Léo	22(2)	1	6	0	0	0	30	1
DF	(Brazil) Triguinho	10(4)	0	16	1	4	0	34	1
MF	(Brazil) Alan Santos	0(1)	0	0	0	0	0	1	0
MF	(Brazil) Germano	18(5)	1	7(6)	0	3	1	39	2
MF	(Brazil) Rodrigo Mancha	16(3)	0	0	0	0	0	19	0
MF	(Brazil) Rodrigo Souto	34	4	18	2	1(1)	0	54	6
MF	(Brazil) Alan Patrick	0(3)	0	0	0	0	0	3	0
MF	(Brazil) Madson	32(5)	7	21(1)	4	4	0	63	11
MF	(Brazil) Ganso	30(1)	8	6(2)	2	1(3)	0	43	10
MF	(Brazil) Róbson	7(16)	4	4(8)	2	1(2)	0	38	4
MF	(Brazil) Felipe Azevedo	7(9)	1	0	0	0	0	16	1
FW	(Brazil) Gil	1(1)	0	0	0	0	0	2	0
FW	(Brazil) Maikon Leite	0(3)	0	0(2)	0	0	0	5	0
FW	(Brazil) Neymar	14(19)	10	10(2)	3	3	1	48	14
FW	(Brazil) André	3(6)	2	0(1)	0	0	0	10	2
FW	(Brazil) Jean	3(3)	0	0	0	0	0	6	0
FW	(Brazil) Kléber Pereira	32	14	19	11	2(1)	3	54	28
Players who left the club during the season
DF	(Brazil) Domingos	9	0	8(3)	0	0	0	20	0
DF	(Brazil) Fabiano Eller	6	0	17	0	2	0	25	0
MF	(Brazil) Adriano	0	0	2(1)	0	0	0	3	0
MF	(Brazil) Emerson	5(1)	0	0	0	0	0	6	0
MF	(Brazil) Lúcio Flávio	0	0	8(1)	0	2(1)	1	12	1
MF	(Colombia) Molina	4(5)	2	4(11)	2	0(1)	0	25	4
MF	(Brazil) Roberto Brum	14	0	19	0	2	0	35	0
MF	(Brazil) Wesley	0	0	0(1)	0	0(1)	0	2	0
FW	(Ecuador) Luis Bolaños	0	0	1(6)	0	1(1)	0	9	0
FW	(Brazil) Roni	3(3)	1	12(7)	4	2	0	27	5
FW	(Brazil) Tiago Luís	0(3)	0	0(2)	0	0	0	5	0

=== Top scorers ===
R	Name	Brasileirão	Paulistão	Copa Brasil	Total
1	(Brazil) Kléber Pereira	14	11	3	28
2	(Brazil) Neymar	10	3	1	14
3	(Brazil) Madson	7	4	0	11
4	(Brazil) Ganso	8	2	0	10
5	(Brazil) Róbson	4	2	0	6
5	(Brazil) Rodrigo Souto	4	2	0	6
6	(Brazil) Roni	1	4	0	5
7	(Colombia) Molina	2	2	0	4

=== Disciplinary record ===
N	Pos.	Nat.	Name	Yellow card	Second yellow card	Red card	Notes
	DF	(Brazil)	Fabão	18			
	DF	(Brazil)	Luizinho	6			
	MF	(Brazil)	Ganso	6			
	FW	(Brazil)	Neymar	8			
	DF	(Brazil)	Fabiano Eller	5	1		
	MF	(Brazil)	Rodrigo Souto	12	1		
	FW	(Brazil)	Maikon Leite	1			
	DF	(Brazil)	Léo	9		2	
	MF	(Colombia)	Molina	4		1	
	MF	(Brazil)	Roberto Brum	11			
	DF	(Brazil)	Wagner Diniz	2			
	MF	(Brazil)	Róbson	6	1	1	
	DF	(Brazil)	Domingos	7	1	1	
	DF	(Brazil)	Pará	6		1	
	FW	(Brazil)	Kléber Pereira	5	1	1	
	DF	(Brazil)	André Astorga	4			
	MF	(Brazil)	Germano	16			
	MF	(Brazil)	Felipe Azevedo	2			
	GK	(Brazil)	Felipe	2			
	MF	(Brazil)	Madson	10			
	MF	(Brazil)	Rodrigo Mancha	3			
	DF	(Brazil)	George Lucas	4			
	DF	(Brazil)	Triguinho	8			
	DF	(Brazil)	Eli Sabiá	4			
	MF	(Brazil)	Alan Santos	1			
	MF	(Brazil)	Emerson	2			
	FW	(Brazil)	Gil	1			
	DF	(Brazil)	Adaílton	3	1		
	MF	(Brazil)	Lúcio Flávio	2	0		
	FW	(Brazil)	Roni	5	0		
	DF	(Brazil)	Paulo Henrique Rodrigues	1	0		
	FW	(Ecuador)	Bolaños	2	0		
	GK	(Brazil)	Fábio Costa	2	0		

Last updated: 6 December 2009
Source: Match reports in Competitive matches.
Only competitive matches
(yellow card) = Number of bookings; (second yellow card) = Number of sending offs after a second yellow card; (red card) = Number of sending offs by a direct red card.

== Transfers ==
=== In ===
P	Nat.	Name	Age	Moving from	Type	Ends	Source
MF	(Brazil)	Madson	22	Vasco	Signed	2011	
MF	(Brazil)	Lúcio Flávio	29	Botafogo	Signed	2010	
DF	(Brazil)	Triguinho	29	São Caetano	Loaned	2009	
MF	(Brazil)	Germano	27	Cerezo Osaka (Japan)	Signed	2010	
DF	(Brazil)	Luizinho	26	Cruzeiro	Loaned	2009	
FW	(Brazil)	Roni	31	Gamba Osaka (Japan)	Signed	2009	
FW	(Ecuador)	Luis Bolaños	23	LDU (Ecuador)	Signed	2011	
DF	(Brazil)	Paulo Henrique Rodrigues	25	Atlético–GO	Loaned	2009	
DF	(Brazil)	André Astorga	29	Cluj (Romania)	Signed	2009	
DF	(Brazil)	Léo	33	Benfica (Portugal)	Signed	2010	
DF	(Brazil)	Rafael Caldeira	18	Marília	Signed	?	
MF	(Brazil)	Alan Santos	18	Vitória	Signed	2012	
MF	(Brazil)	Felipe Azevedo	22	Paulista	Loaned	2009	
DF	(Brazil)	Eli Sabiá	21	Paulista	Loaned	2009	
GK	(Brazil)	Felipe	21	Portuguesa Santista	Loan return	2012	
DF	(Brazil)	Wagner Diniz	25	São Paulo	Loaned	2009	
MF	(Brazil)	Rodrigo Mancha	23	Coritiba	Signed	2012	
MF	(Brazil)	Emerson	33	Milan (Italy)	Signed	2009	
DF	(Brazil)	George Lucas	25	Celta de Vigo (Spain)	Signed	2010	
GK	(Brazil)	Sérgio	39	Itumbiara	Signed	2009	
FW	(Brazil)	Jean	27	Al Sharjah (United Arab Emirates)	Signed	2009	
DF	(Brazil)	Edu Dracena	28	Fenerbahçe (Turkey)	Signed	2012	
FW	(Brazil)	Gil	18	Vila Nova	Loaned	2010	

=== Out ===
P	Nat.	Name	Age	Moving to	Type	Source
MF	(Brazil)	Bida	24	Vitória	Loan expiration	
FW	(Brazil)	Vitor Júnior	22	Kawasaki Frontale (Japan)	End of contract	
FW	(Brazil)	Lima	25	Avaí	Loan expiration	
FW	(Brazil)	Reginaldo	27	Free Agent	End of contract	
DF	(Brazil)	Fabiano	26	Confiança	End of contract	
MF	(Brazil)	Michael	26	Dynamo Kyiv (Ukraine)	Loan expiration	
DF	(Brazil)	Fábio Santos	23	Grêmio	Loan expiration	
DF	(Brazil)	Wendel	27	Palmeiras	Loan expiration	
MF	(Brazil)	Adoniran	23	Free Agent	Contract terminated	
DF	(Brazil)	Anderson Salles	22	Bragantino	End of contract	
FW	(Paraguay)	Nelson Cuevas	29	Free Agent	Contract terminated	
DF	(Brazil)	Kléber	29	Inter	Transferred	
MF	(Ecuador)	Quiñónez	24	El Nacional (Ecuador)	Contract terminated	
MF	(Ecuador)	Bolaños	24	Internacional	Contract terminated	
FW	(Argentina)	Trípodi	21	Free Agent	Contract terminated	
MF	(Brazil)	Lúcio Flávio	30	Botafogo	Contract terminated	
MF	(Colombia)	Molina	29	Seongnam Ilhwa Chunma (South Korea)	Transferred	
FW	(Brazil)	Roni	32	Fluminense	Contract terminated	
DF	(Brazil)	Fabiano Eller	31	Free Agent	Contract terminated	
MF	(Brazil)	Emerson	30	Free Agent	Contract terminated	
DF	(Brazil)	Carlinhos	22	Santo André	Contract terminated	

=== Out on loan ===
P	Name	Age	Moving to	Source
GK	(Brazil) Felipe	21	Paraná Clube	
DF	(Brazil) Carlinhos	21	Mirassol	
MF	(Brazil) Dionísio	20	Oeste	
MF	(Brazil) Patrik	21	Comercial	
MF	(Brazil) Hudson	21	Santa Cruz	
DF	(Brazil) Anderson Salles	21	Juventus	
GK	(Brazil) Vladimir	20	Fortaleza	
FW	(Argentina) Mariano Trípodi	21	Atlético Mineiro	
MF	(Brazil) Wesley	22	Atlético–PR	
GK	(Brazil) Felipe	21	Portuguesa Santista	
MF	(Brazil) Adriano	21	São Caetano	
DF	(Brazil) Filipi Souza	21	Uberaba	
MF	(Brazil) Patrik	21	Uberaba	
MF	(Brazil) Hudson	22	Ituano	
DF	(Brazil) Vinicius Simon	22	Santo André	
FW	(Brazil) Tiago Luís	20	União Leiria (Portugal)	
MF	(Brazil) Roberto Brum	30	Figueirense	
DF	(Brazil) Domingos	24	Portuguesa	

== Kit ==
Supplier: Umbro

Home	Away	Third

=== Official sponsorship ===
- Semp Toshiba
- Universo Tintas

== Friendlies ==
18 January	Santos	2–1	Portuguesa Santista	São Paulo
17:00 UTC−02:00	Kléber Pereira 16', 27'	Report	90+2' William	Stadium: Estadio do Pacaembu; Attendance: 14,330; Referee: Paulo Roberto Ferreira

12 November	Santos Laguna (Mexico)	2–1	(Brazil) Santos	Torreón, Mexico
22:15 UTC−06:00	Matias Vuoso 6'; Carlos Ochoa 90+3'	Report	88' Jean	Stadium: Estadio Corona; Attendance: 30,000; Referee: (Mexico) Marco Antonio Rodríguez

== Competitions ==
=== Overall summary ===
Competition	Started round	Final position / round	First match	Last match
Campeonato Brasileiro	—	12th	10 May	6 December
Campeonato Paulista	First stage	Runner-up	22 January	3 May
Copa do Brasil	First round	Second round	2 February	22 April

Updated to match played 6 December 2009
Source: Competitions

=== Detailed overall summary ===
	Total	Home	Away
Games played	65	33	32
Games won	27	18	9
Games drawn	19	8	11
Games lost	19	7	12
Biggest win	4–0 v Coritiba; 4–0 v Rio Branco–AC	4–0 v Coritiba; 4–0 v Rio Branco–AC	4–1 v Fluminense
Biggest loss	2–6 v Vitória	1–3 v Palmeiras; 1–3 v Corinthians	2–6 v Vitória
Clean sheets	22	16	6
Goals scored	98	59	39
Goals conceded	83	35	48
Goal difference	+15	+24	−9
Average GF per game	1.51	1.79	1.22
Average GA per game	1.28	1.06	1.5
Most appearances	Madson (63)	Madson (32)	Madson (31)
Top scorer	Kléber Pereira (28)	Neymar (12)	Kléber Pereira (17)
Worst discipline	Fabão (yellow card) (18)	Fabão (yellow card) (11)	Germano (yellow card) (10)
Points	100/195 (51.28%)	62/99 (62.63%)	38/96 (39.58%)
Winning rate	(41.54%)	(54.55%)	(28.13%)

Last updated: 6 December 2009
Source: Competitive matches

=== Campeonato Brasileiro ===
==== League table ====
Pos	Team	Pld	W	D	L	GF	GA	GD	Pts	Qualification or relegation
10	Corinthians	38	14	10	14	50	54	−4	52	2010 Copa Libertadores Second Stage (Note: Corinthians qualified as the 2009 Copa do Brasil champion.)
11	Grêmio Barueri	38	12	13	13	59	52	+7	49	2010 Copa Sudamericana Second Stage
12	Santos	38	12	13	13	58	58	0	49	2010 Copa Sudamericana Second Stage
13	Vitória	38	13	9	16	51	57	−6	48	2010 Copa Sudamericana Second Stage
14	Atlético Paranaense	38	13	9	16	42	49	−7	48	

Source: CBF (in Portuguese)
Rules for classification: 1st points; 2nd wins; 3rd goal difference; 4th goals scored; 5th head-to-head results; 6th least red cards received; 7th least yellow cards received; 8th draw

==== Results summary ====
Overall								Home						Away					
Pld	W	D	L	GF	GA	GD	Pts	W	D	L	GF	GA	GD	W	D	L	GF	GA	GD
38	12	13	13	58	58	0	49	8	6	5	34	27	+7	4	7	8	24	31	−7

Last updated: 6 December 2009.
Source: Competitive matches

==== Results by round ====
Round	1	2	3	4	5	6	7	8	9	10	11	12	13	14	15	16	17	18	19	20	21	22	23	24	25	26	27	28	29	30	31	32	33	34	35	36	37	38
Ground	A	H	A	H	A	A	H	A	H	A	H	A	H	H	A	H	A	H	A	H	A	H	A	H	H	A	H	A	H	A	H	A	A	H	A	H	A	H
Result	D	D	W	W	D	L	L	D	W	L	D	L	W	L	W	D	W	L	D	W	L	W	L	W	D	L	L	W	D	D	L	D	L	W	L	W	D	L
Position	10	10	6	3	4	5	10	10	9	11	11	13	10	12	12	12	12	12	11	10	11	11	11	10	12	12	13	11	13	13	13	13	13	12	12	12	11	12

Updated to match(es) played on 6 December 2009. Source: Futpédia
A = Away; H = Home; W = Win; D = Draw; L = Loss

==== Matches ====
10 May 1	Grêmio	1–1	Santos	Porto Alegre
18:30 UTC−03:00	Réver 76'	Report	85' Molina	Stadium: Olímpico; Attendance: 24,309; Referee: Alício Pena Júnior

17 May 2	Santos	3–3	Goiás	Santos
16:00 UTC−03:00	Kléber Pereira 8'; Rodrigo Souto 11', 47'	Report	38' Iarley; 61' Ramalho; 86' Toloi	Stadium: Vila Belmiro; Attendance: 9,511; Referee: Ricardo Marques Ribeiro

24 May 3	Fluminense	1–4	Santos	Rio de Janeiro
16:00 UTC−03:00	Mariano 9'	Report	38' Molina; 52' Madson; 85', 87' Kléber Pereira	Stadium: Maracanã; Attendance: 11,953; Referee: Leandro Vuaden

31 May 4	Santos	3–1	Corinthians	Santos
16:00 UTC−03:00	Ganso 17', 30'; Madson 90'	Report	50' Renato	Stadium: Vila Belmiro; Attendance: 10,666; Referee: Leandro Vuaden

4 June 5	Santo André	3–3	Santos	Santo André
21:00 UTC−03:00	Nunes 14', 44'; Élvis 72' (pen.)	Report	7' Kléber Pereira; 25' Madson; 65' Fabão	Stadium: Bruno José Daniel; Attendance: 7,818; Referee: Luiz Flávio de Oliveira

13 June 6	Botafogo	2–0	Santos	Rio de Janeiro
18:30 UTC−03:00	Batista 83'; Laio 86'	Report		Stadium: Engenhão; Attendance: 8,535; Referee: Evandro Rogério Roman

21 June 7	Santos	2–3	Atlético Mineiro	Santos
19:30 UTC−03:00	Neymar 45'; Léo 88'	Report	59' Diego Tardelli; 64' Evandro; 74' Carlos Alberto	Stadium: Vila Belmiro; Attendance: 7,214; Referee: Djalma Beltrami

28 June 8	Palmeiras	1–1	Santos	São Paulo
18:30 UTC−03:00	Obina 32'	Report	81' Róbson	Stadium: Palestra Itália; Attendance: 8,277; Referee: Leonardo Gaciba

4 July 9	Santos	1–0	Sport	Santos
18:30 UTC−03:00	Ganso 88'	Report		Stadium: Vila Belmiro; Attendance: 7,026; Referee: Alício Pena Júnior

12 July 10	Vitória	6–2	Santos	Salvador
18:30 UTC−03:00	Roger 3', 15'; Willian 24'; Víctor Ramos 27'; Leandro Domingues 72' (pen.); Jackson Coelho 78'	Report	45' (pen.) Kléber Pereira; 61' Ganso	Stadium: Barradão; Attendance: 17,090; Referee: Pablo dos Santos Alves

15 July 11	Santos	3–3	Grêmio Barueri	Santos
21:00 UTC−03:00	Madson 26'; Róbson 80'; Neymar 88'	Report	12', 30' Val Baiano; 17' Fernandinho	Stadium: Vila Belmiro; Attendance: 3,524; Referee: Guilherme Ceretta

19 July 12	São Paulo	2–1	Santos	São Paulo
16:00 UTC−03:00	Washington 44', 50'	Report	45' Roni	Stadium: Morumbi; Attendance: 10,913; Referee: José Henrique de Carvalho

22 July 13	Santos	1–0	Atlético–PR	Santos
21:00 UTC−03:00	Neymar 73'	Report		Stadium: Vila Belmiro; Attendance: 7,375; Referee: Wágner Tardelli

26 July 14	Santos	1–2	Flamengo	Santos
21:00 UTC−03:00	Róbson 69'	Report	77' Adriano; 86' (o.g.) Pará	Stadium: Vila Belmiro; Attendance: 10,633; Referee: Héber Roberto Lopes

29 July 15	Náutico	1–2	Santos	Recife
19:30 UTC−03:00	Gilmar 77' (pen.)	Report	67' Neymar; 90' Rodrigo Souto	Stadium: Aflitos; Attendance: 13,515; Referee: Jaílson Macedo Freitas

5 August 17	Coritiba	0–1	Santos	Curitiba
21:50 UTC−03:00		Report	20' Ganso	Stadium: Couto Pereira; Attendance: 8,952; Referee: Sandro Meira Ricci

8 August 18	Santos	2–2	Avaí	Santos
18:30 UTC−03:00	Madson 9'; Kléber Pereira 51'	Report	66' William; 69' Émerson	Stadium: Vila Belmiro; Attendance: 12,074; Referee: Wallace Nascimento

16 August 19	Cruzeiro	0–0	Santos	Belo Horizonte
18:30 UTC−03:00		Report		Stadium: Mineirão; Attendance: 16,939; Referee: Marcelo de Lima Henrique

19 August 20	Santos	1–0	Grêmio	Santos
19:30 UTC−03:00	Ganso 79'	Report		Stadium: Vila Belmiro; Attendance: 6,999; Referee: André Luiz de Freita Castro

23 August 21	Goiás	2–1	Santos	Goiânia
18:30 UTC−03:00	Vítor 19'; Felipe 50'	Report	29' Kléber Pereira	Stadium: Serra Dourada; Attendance: 12,328; Referee: Héber Roberto Lopes

26 August 16	Santos	3–3	Internacional	Santos
21:00 UTC−03:00	Madson 13'; Kléber Pereira 15', 59'	Report	24', 26', 50' Alecsandro	Stadium: Vila Belmiro; Attendance: 7,876; Referee: Luís Antônio Silva dos Santos

30 August 22	Santos	2–0	Fluminense	Santos
16:00 UTC−03:00	André 44'; Ganso 74'	Report		Stadium: Vila Belmiro; Attendance: 9,705; Referee: Evandro Rogério Roman

2 September 23	Corinthians	2–1	Santos	São Paulo
21:50 UTC−03:00	Bill 79'; Chicão 88'	Report	51' Eli Sabiá	Stadium: Pacaembu; Attendance: 25,645; Referee: Guilherme Ceretta

13 September 24	Santos	1–0	Santo André	Santos
16:00 UTC−03:00	Germano 39'	Report		Stadium: Vila Belmiro; Attendance: 7,790; Referee: Paulo César Oliveira

20 September 25	Santos	0–0	Botafogo	Santos
18:30 UTC−03:00		Report		Stadium: Vila Belmiro; Attendance: 6,336; Referee: Leonardo Gaciba

27 September 26	Atlético Mineiro	3–1	Santos	Belo Horizonte
18:30 UTC−03:00	Evandro 5'; Diego Tardelli 56' (pen.), 74'	Report	79' Kléber Pereira	Stadium: Mineirão; Attendance: 36.294; Referee: Wilton Pereira Sampaio

4 October 27	Santos	1–3	Palmeiras	Santos
16:00 UTC−03:00	Luizinho 53'	Report	63' Diego Souza; 72' Robert; 76' Vágner Love	Stadium: Vila Belmiro; Attendance: 10,402; Referee: Sálvio Spinola

7 October 28	Sport	0–1	Santos	Recife
19:30 UTC−03:00		Report	37' Felipe Azevedo	Stadium: Ilha do Retiro; Attendance: 26,249; Referee: Wagner Tardelli

12 October 29	Santos	0–0	Vitória	São Paulo
16:00 UTC−03:00		Report		Stadium: Pacaembu; Attendance: 23,673; Referee: Wagner Reway

17 October 30	Grêmio Barueri	0–0	Santos	Barueri
18:30 UTC−03:00		Report		Stadium: Arena Barueri; Attendance: 3,688; Referee: Marcelo Aparecido

25 October 31	Santos	3–4	São Paulo	Santos
16:00 UTC−02:00	André 5'; Rodrigo Souto 25'; Róbson 66'	Report	11' Hernanes; 38' Washington; 59' Jorge Wágner; 68' Rogério Ceni	Stadium: Vila Belmiro; Attendance: 8,735; Referee: Carlos Eugênio Simon

28 October 32	Atlético–PR	1–1	Santos	Curitiba
19:30 UTC−02:00	Bruno Costa 52'	Report	49' (pen.) Kléber Pereira	Stadium: Arena da Baixada; Attendance: 17,930; Referee: Francisco Assis Almeida

31 October 33	Flamengo	1–0	Santos	Rio de Janeiro
18:30 UTC−02:00	Adriano 6'	Report		Stadium: Maracanã; Attendance: 77,063; Referee: Nelson Nogueira Dias

7 November 34	Santos	3–1	Náutico	São Paulo
18:30 UTC−02:00	Kléber Pereira 30' (pen.); Neymar 59', 89'	Report	68' (pen.) Aílton	Stadium: Pacaembu; Attendance: 15,634; Referee: Wagner Tardelli

15 November 35	Internacional	3–1	Santos	Porto Alegre
19:30 UTC−02:00	Danilo Silva 25'; Marquinhos Gabriel 28'; D'Alessandro 78'	Report	63' Neymar	Stadium: Beira-Rio; Attendance: 12,944; Referee: Arilson Bispo da Anunciação

22 November 36	Santos	4–0	Coritiba	Santos
17:00 UTC−02:00	Madson 21'; Kléber Pereira 25'; Neymar 64', 89'	Report		Stadium: Vila Belmiro; Attendance: Ricardo Marques Ribeiro; Referee: 3,942

29 November 37	Avaí	2–2	Santos	Florianópolis
17:00 UTC−02:00	Cristian 3' (pen.), 9'	Report	28' (pen.) Kléber Pereira; 89' Ganso	Stadium: Ressacada; Attendance: 7,952; Referee: Leonardo Gaciba

6 December 38	Santos	1–2	Cruzeiro	Santos
17:00 UTC−02:00	Neymar 68'	Report	5' Wellington Paulista; 75' Kléber	Stadium: Vila Belmiro; Attendance: Marcelo de Lima Henrique; Referee: 6,492

=== Campeonato Paulista ===
==== Results summary ====
Overall								Home						Away					
Pld	W	D	L	GF	GA	GD	Pts	W	D	L	GF	GA	GD	W	D	L	GF	GA	GD
23	13	5	5	34	23	+11	44	9	2	1	21	7	+14	4	3	4	13	16	−3

Last updated: 3 May 2009.
Source: Competitive matches

==== First stage ====
===== League table =====
Pos	Team	Pld	W	D	L	GF	GA	GD	Pts	Qualification or relegation
2	São Paulo	19	12	4	3	33	17	+16	40	Advances to Semifinals
3	Corinthians	19	10	9	0	33	15	+18	39	Advances to Semifinals
4	Santos	19	11	4	4	28	17	+11	37	Advances to Semifinals
5	Portuguesa	19	11	4	4	27	17	+10	37	
6	Santo André	19	10	3	6	31	20	+11	33	Qualification for Interior Championship of São Paulo

Updated to match(es) played on 5 April 2009. Source: RSSSF Brazil
Rules for classification: 1) points; 2) goal difference; 3) number of goals scored.

===== Results by round =====
Round	1	2	3	4	5	6	7	8	9	10	11	12	13	14	15	16	17	18	19
Ground	H	A	H	A	H	A	A	H	H	A	H	A	H	H	A	H	A	H	A
Result	W	W	D	L	W	L	L	W	W	D	W	W	D	W	L	W	D	W	W
Position	2	2	3	7	4	7	8	6	5	6	4	4	5	4	6	5	5	4	4

Updated to match(es) played on 5 April 2009. Source: Futpédia
W = Win; D = Draw; L = Loss

===== Matches =====
22 January 1	Santos	2–0	Guaratinguetá	Santos
21:30 UTC−02:00	Kléber Pereira 5', 22'	Report		Stadium: Vila Belmiro; Attendance: 11,872; Referee: Flavio Rodrigues Guerra

25 January 2	Noroeste	1–2	Santos	Bauru
19:10 UTC−02:00	Douglas 1'	Report	77' Rodrigo Souto; 86' (pen.) Kléber Pereira	Stadium: Alfredão; Attendance: 5,041; Referee: José Henrique de Carvalho

29 January 3	Santos	1–1	Mirassol	Santos
20:30 UTC−02:00	Roni 39'	Report	90+3' Wesley	Stadium: Vila Belmiro; Attendance: 8,793; Referee: Paulo Roberto Ferreira

1 February 4	Ituano	2–0	Santos	Itu
19:10 UTC−02:00	Ricardo Xavier 29'; Alex Afonso 45'	Report		Stadium: Novelli Júnior; Attendance: 5,315; Referee: Paulo Cesar de Oliveira

5 February 5	Santos	2–0	São Caetano	Santos
21:30 UTC−02:00	Róbson 65', 73'	Report		Stadium: Vila Belmiro; Attendance: 6,899; Referee: Guilherme Ceretta de Lima

8 February 6	Palmeiras	4–1	Santos	São Paulo
17:00 UTC−02:00	Edmílson 15'; Keirrison 22' (pen.), 50'; Lenny 84'	Report	63' Kléber Pereira	Stadium: Palestra Itália; Attendance: 24,515; Referee: Luiz Flavio de Oliveira

12 February 7	Marília	1–0	Santos	Marília
21:30 UTC−02:00	Cláudio 9'	Report		Stadium: Bento de Abreu; Attendance: 4,115; Referee: Robério Pereira Pires

15 February 8	Santos	3–1	Guarani	Santos
19:10 UTC−02:00	Madson 10'; Fabão 59'; Ganso 86'	Report	9' Henrique	Stadium: Vila Belmiro; Attendance: 3,191; Referee: Wilson Luiz Seneme

22 February 9	Santos	1–0	Botafogo	São Paulo
17:00 UTC−03:00	Fabão 51'	Report		Stadium: Pacaembu; Attendance: 20,981; Referee: Antonio Rogério Batista do Prado

26 February 10	Bragantino	2–2	Santos	Bragança Paulista
21:30 UTC−03:00	Malaquias 23'; Marcelo Godri 39'	Report	58' Rodrigo Souto; 72' Molina	Stadium: Nabi Abi Chedid; Attendance: 2,107; Referee: Paulo Roberto Ferreira

1 March 11	Santos	1–0	São Paulo	Santos
16:00 UTC−03:00	Molina 40'	Report		Stadium: Vila Belmiro; Attendance: 9,299; Referee: Wilson Luiz Seneme

7 March 12	Oeste	1–2	Santos	São Paulo
19:10 UTC−03:00	Dézinho 90+1'	Report	64' Roni; 89' Madson	Stadium: Pacaembu; Attendance: 21,875; Referee: Marcelo Prieto Alfier

12 March 13	Santos	1–1	Paulista	Santos
21:30 UTC−03:00	Roni 85'	Report	18' Zé Carlos	Stadium: Vila Belmiro; Attendance: 4,623; Referee: Flavio Rodrigues de Souza

15 March 14	Santos	3–0	Mogi Mirim	São Paulo
19:10 UTC−03:00	Ganso 56'; Roni 68'; Neymar 72'	Report		Stadium: Pacaembu; Attendance: 16,115; Referee: Márcio Roberto Soares

22 March 15	Corinthians	1–0	Santos	São Paulo
16:00 UTC−03:00	Dentinho 15'	Report		Stadium: Pacaembu; Attendance: 33,356; Referee: Rodrigo Martins Cintra

25 March 16	Santos	3–0	Santo André	Santos
19:30 UTC−03:00	Madson 18'; Triguinho 40'; Neymar 66'	Report		Stadium: Vila Belmiro; Attendance: 9,572; Referee: Sálvio Spínola Fagundes Filho

28 March 17	Grêmio Barueri	0–0	Santos	Barueri
16:10 UTC−03:00		Report		Stadium: Arena Barueri; Attendance: 6,389; Referee: Rodrigo Guarizo Ferreira do Amaral

2 April 18	Santos	1–0	Portuguesa	Santos
15:45 UTC−03:00	Kléber Pereira 46'	Report		Stadium: Vila Belmiro; Attendance: 18,661; Referee: José Henrique de Carvalho

5 April 19	Ponte Preta	2–3	Santos	Campinas
16:00 UTC−03:00	Dayvid Henrique 46'; Gum 49'	Report	39', 82', 88' (pen.) Kléber Pereira	Stadium: Moisés Lucarelli; Attendance: 8,466; Referee: Rodrigo Braghetto

==== Knockout stage ====
===== Semi-finals =====
11 April 1st Leg	Santos	2–1	Palmeiras	Santos
18:10 UTC−03:00	Kléber Pereira 18'; Neymar 46'	Report	8' Keirrison	Stadium: Vila Belmiro; Attendance: 17,773; Referee: Wilson Luiz Seneme

18 April 2nd Leg	Palmeiras	1–2 (2–4 agg.)	Santos	São Paulo
18:10 UTC−03:00	Pierre 75'	Report	17' Madson; 51' (pen.) Kléber Pereira	Stadium: Palestra Itália; Attendance: 26,420; Referee: Sálvio Spínola Fagundes Filho

===== Finals =====
26 April 1st Leg	Santos	1–3	Corinthians	Santos
16:00 UTC−03:00	Felipe 51' (o.g.)	Report	16' Chicão; 25', 76' Ronaldo	Stadium: Vila Belmiro; Attendance: 17,259; Referee: Wilson Luiz Seneme

3 May 2nd Leg	Corinthians	1–1 (4–2 agg.)	Santos	São Paulo
16:00 UTC−03:00	André Santos 33'	Report	28' (pen.) Kléber Pereira	Stadium: Pacaembu; Attendance: 35,175; Referee: Sálvio Spínola Fagundes Filho

=== Copa do Brasil ===
==== First round ====
2 February 1st Leg	Rio Branco–AC	1–2	Santos	Rio Branco
21:50 UTC−03:00	Juliano César 3'	Report	19', 86' Kléber Pereira	Stadium: Arena da Floresta

18 March 2nd Leg	Santos	4–0 (6–1 agg.)	Rio Branco–AC	Santos
21:50 UTC−03:00	Neymar 59'; Lúcio Flávio 62'; Germano 68'; Kléber Pereira 86'	Report		Stadium: Vila Belmiro

==== Second round ====
8 April 1st Leg	CSA	0–0	Santos	Maceió
21:50 UTC−03:00		Report		Stadium: Rei Pelé

22 April 2nd Leg	Santos	0–1 (0–1 agg.)	CSA	Santos
21:50 UTC−03:00		Report	7' Júnior Amorim	Stadium: Vila Belmiro
