= 2008 Santos FC season =

Santos FC
2008 season
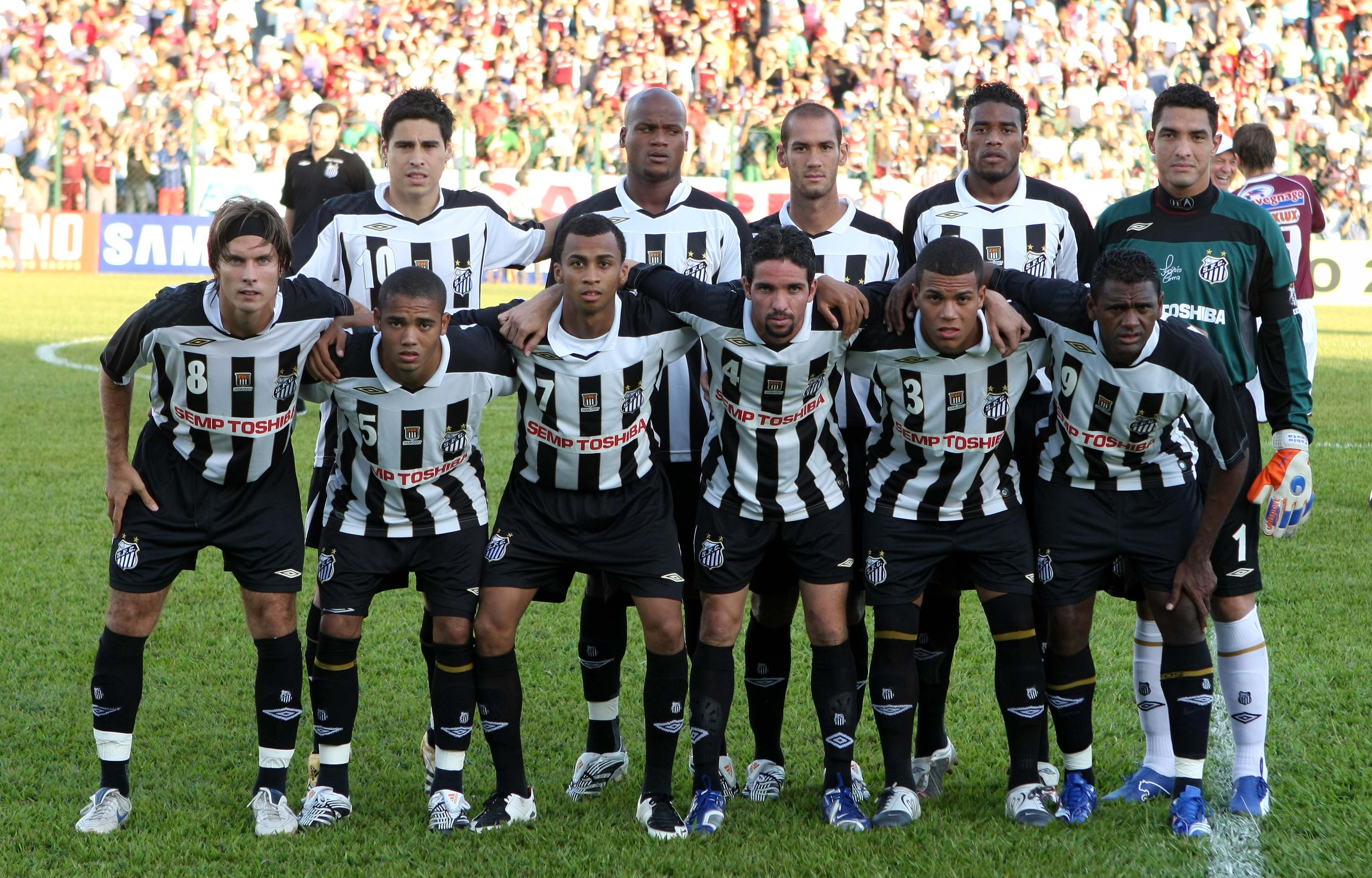
- Santos lineup before the match against Sertãozinho on 1 March
- President: Marcelo Teixeira
- Coach: Emerson Leão (until 27 May); Cuca (until 7 August); Márcio Fernandes (caretaker)
- Campeonato Brasileiro: 15th
- Campeonato Paulista: 7th
- Copa Libertadores: Quarter-finals
- Top goalscorer: League: Kléber Pereira (21); All: Kléber Pereira (40)
Home colours	Away colours	Third colours

The 2008 season was Santos Futebol Clube's ninety-sixth in existence and the club's forty-ninth consecutive season in the top flight of Brazilian football.

On 15 December 2007, Santos appointed Emerson Leão to coach the team for the third time. This was after the dismissal of Vanderlei Luxemburgo at the end of 2007 season. Later, Leão was fired due to bad results and for his place Cuca was signed. Cuca also didn't get good results and was fired on 7 August, replaced by Márcio Fernandes, who assumed the team as caretaker until the end of season.

Unlike the last two seasons, Santos did not get the Campeonato Paulista title, reaching the 7th position. Their Campeonato Brasileiro campaign was the worst of history, where they were almost relegated, ending in the 15th position, out of 20 teams. Santos advanced to quarter-finals of Copa Libertadores, but were eliminated by Mexican side Club América after a 1–2 aggregate loss.

== Players ==
=== Squad information ===
Note: Flags indicate national team as defined under FIFA eligibility rules; some limited exceptions apply. Players may hold more than one non-FIFA nationality.

No.	Pos.	Nation	Player
—	GK	BRA	Fábio Costa
—	GK	BRA	Felipe
—	GK	BRA	Douglas
—	DF	BRA	Fabiano Eller
—	DF	BRA	Adaílton
—	DF	BRA	Domingos
—	DF	BRA	Anderson Salles
—	DF	BRA	Fabão
—	DF	BRA	Kléber
—	DF	BRA	Fábio Santos
—	DF	BRA	Thiago Carleto
—	MF	BRA	Wendel
—	MF	BRA	Filipi Souza
—	DF	BRA	Pará
—	MF	BRA	Luiz Henrique
—	MF	BRA	Patrik
—	MF	COL	Molina
—	MF	ECU	Michael Quiñónez

No.	Pos.	Nation	Player
—	MF	BRA	Ganso
—	MF	BRA	Bida
—	MF	BRA	Róbson
—	FW	BRA	Wesley
—	MF	BRA	Roberto Brum
—	MF	BRA	Rodrigo Souto
—	MF	BRA	Adriano
—	MF	BRA	Díonísio
—	MF	BRA	Hudson
—	MF	BRA	Adoniran
—	MF	BRA	Michael
—	FW	PAR	Nelson Cuevas
—	FW	BRA	Tiago Luís
—	FW	BRA	Fabiano
—	FW	BRA	Reginaldo
—	FW	BRA	Maikon Leite
—	FW	BRA	Lima
—	FW	BRA	Kléber Pereira

=== Appearances and goals ===
Pos.	Name	Campeonato Brasileiro		Campeonato Paulista		Copa Libertadores		Total	
Pos.	Name	Apps	Goals	Apps	Goals	Apps	Goals	Apps	Goals
GK	(Brazil) Douglas	17	0	1	0	0	0	18	0
GK	(Brazil) Fabio Costa	18	0	17	0	10	0	45	0
GK	(Brazil) Felipe	3	0	1	0	0	0	4	0
DF	(Brazil) Adaílton	7	0	8	0	1	0	16	0
DF	(Brazil) Anderson Salles	0(1)	0	2(3)	0	0(2)	0	8	0
DF	(Brazil) Domingos	27	0	10(2)	0	6	1	45	1
DF	(Brazil) Fabão	14(2)	0	1(2)	0	6(1)	0	26	0
DF	(Brazil) Fabiano	1(2)	0	0	0	0	0	3	0
DF	(Brazil) Fabiano Eller	19	1	0	0	0	0	19	1
DF	(Brazil) Fábio Santos	3(2)	0	0	0	0	0	5	0
DF	(Brazil) Kléber	31	1	8	1	8	1	47	3
DF	(Brazil) Pará	4(8)	1	0	0	0	0	12	1
MF	(Brazil) Adriano	16(5)	0	11(2)	0	5(1)	0	40	0
MF	(Brazil) Adoniran	3(3)	0	7	0	0	0	13	0
MF	(Brazil) Bida	16	2	0	0	0	0	16	2
MF	(Brazil) Dionísio	7(2)	0	1	0	0	0	10	0
MF	(Brazil) Ganso	2(1)	0	1(2)	0	0	0	6	0
MF	(Brazil) Hudson	2(2)	0	1	0	0	0	5	0
MF	(Brazil) Michael	15(4)	1	0	0	0	0	19	1
MF	(Colombia) Molina	23(10)	6	10	1	10	6	53	13
MF	(Brazil) Patrik	0(1)	0	0	0	0	0	1	0
MF	(Brazil) Roberto Brum	17(1)	0	0	0	0	0	0	0
MF	(Brazil) Róbson	6(3)	0	0	0	0	0	9	0
MF	(Brazil) Rodrigo Souto	25	1	14	1	9(1)	0	49	2
MF	(Brazil) Wendel	16	0	0	0	0	0	16	0
FW	(Brazil) Fabiano	0	0	0(1)	0	0	0	1	0
FW	(Brazil) Kléber Pereira	33(1)	21	16	13	10	6	60	40
FW	(Brazil) Lima	8(14)	0	0	0	4	2	26	2
FW	(Brazil) Maikon Leite	7(3)	2	0	0	0	0	10	2
FW	(Paraguay) Cuevas	14(3)	2	0	0	0	0	17	2
FW	(Ecuador) Quiñónez	3(5)	0	11	0	1(4)	1	15	1
FW	(Brazil) Reginaldo	0(1)	0	0	0	0	0	1	0
FW	(Brazil) Tiago Luís	3(10)	1	5(2)	1	0(3)	0	23	2
FW	(Brazil) Wesley	6(13)	0	10(1)	1	8(1)	0	39	1
Players who left the club during the season
DF	(Brazil) Apodi	9(2)	1	0	0	0	0	11	1
DF	(Brazil) Betão	5	0	17	2	10	0	32	2
DF	(Brazil) Carlinhos	2	0	3	0	0	0	5	0
DF	(Brazil) Dênis	0	0	6	0	2	0	8	0
DF	(Brazil) Evaldo	0(1)	0	6	0	0(2)	0	9	0
DF	(Brazil) Filipi Souza	3	0	4	0	0	0	7	0
DF	(Brazil) Marcelo	16	0	3(3)	0	4	0	26	0
DF	(Brazil) Thiago Carleto	4(5)	0	10	0	2	0	21	0
DF	(Brazil) Vinicius Simon	1	0	0	0	0	0	1	0
MF	(Brazil) Alex William	0	0	1(2)	0	0	0	3	0
MF	(Brazil) Luiz Henrique	0	0	1(1)	0	0	0	2	0
MF	(Brazil) Marcinho Guerreiro	5	0	11(3)	3	10	0	29	3
MF	(Brazil) Rodrigo Tabata	3(3)	0	6(5)	1	2(2)	0	21	1
MF	(Brazil) Vitor Júnior	0(1)	0	1(5)	0	0	0	7	0
FW	(Brazil) Alemão	0	0	2(2)	1	0	0	4	1
FW	(Brazil) Moraes	0(1)	1	1(3)	0	0	0	5	1
FW	(Brazil) Renatinho	0	0	5(7)	2	0	0	12	2
FW	(Chile) Sebastián Pinto	0	0	6	1	0	0	6	1
FW	(Argentina) Tripodí	0(2)	0	3(2)	0	1(5)	1	13	1

Source: Match reports in Competitive matches

=== Top scorers ===
R	Name	Brasileirão	Paulistão	Libertadores	Total
1	(Brazil) Kleber Pereira	21	13	6	40
2	(Colombia) Molina	6	1	6	13
3	(Brazil) Kléber	1	1	1	3
3	(Brazil) Marcinho Guerreiro	0	3	0	3
4	(Brazil) Maikon Leite	2	0	0	2
4	(Paraguay) Nelson Cuevas	2	0	0	2
4	(Brazil) Bida	2	0	0	2
4	(Brazil) Betão	0	2	0	2
4	(Brazil) Renatinho	0	2	0	2
4	(Brazil) Lima	0	0	2	2
4	(Brazil) Tiago Luís	1	1	0	2
4	(Brazil) Rodrigo Souto	1	1	0	2

Source: Match reports in Competitive matches

=== Disciplinary record ===
Nat.	P	Name	Brasileirão		Libertadores		Paulistão		Total	
Nat.	P	Name	Yellow card	Red card	Yellow card	Red card	Yellow card	Red card	Yellow card	Red card
(Brazil)	GK	Douglas	2						2	
(Brazil)	GK	Fábio Costa	3				1		4	
(Brazil)	DF	Adaílton	2				3		5	
(Brazil)	DF	Betão	2		1		2		5	
(Brazil)	DF	Domingos	11		2	1	4	2	17	3
(Brazil)	DF	Evaldo			1		1	1	2	1
(Brazil)	DF	Fabão	3		1				4	
(Brazil)	DF	Fabiano Eller	4	1					4	1
(Brazil)	DF	Marcelo	4				1		5	
(Brazil)	DF	Apodi	4						4	
(Brazil)	DF	Anderson Salles			1		1		2	
(Brazil)	DF	Dênis					1		1	
(Brazil)	DF	Fabiano	1						1	
(Brazil)	DF	Pará	1						1	
(Brazil)	DF	Kléber	4		1		3		8	
(Brazil)	DF	Fábio Santos	1				1		2	
(Brazil)	DF	Thiago Carleto	2				2		4	
(Brazil)	MF	Adoniran	2						2	
(Brazil)	MF	Adriano	4		1		1	1	6	1
(Brazil)	MF	Bida	3						3	
(Brazil)	MF	Dionísio	4						4	
(Brazil)	MF	Hudson	1				1		2	
(Colombia)	MF	Molina	2		2		1		5	
(Brazil)	MF	Michael	6						6	
(Brazil)	MF	Marcinho Guerreiro	5		1		5		11	
(Ecuador)	MF	Quiñónez	2		1				3	
(Brazil)	MF	Roberto Brum	5						5	
(Brazil)	MF	Rodrigo Souto	6		1		3		10	
(Brazil)	MF	Rodrigo Tabata					1	1	1	1
(Brazil)	MF	Wendel	2						2	
(Brazil)	FW	Alemão					1		1	
(Brazil)	FW	Kléber Pereira	6		2		3		11	
(Brazil)	FW	Maikon Leite	3						3	
(Argentina)	FW	Mariano Trípodi			1				1	
(Paraguay)	FW	Nelson Cuevas	1						1	
(Brazil)	FW	Tiago Luís	1		1				2	
(Brazil)	FW	Vítor Júnior					1		1	
(Brazil)	FW	Wesley	3	1	2	1	3		6	2

Source: Match reports in Competitive matches

== Kit ==
The kits for the 2008 season were revealed on 3 March 2008 bearing the Semp Toshiba logo. The main novelty was the third shirt, with navy blue, based on the first model used by the club in 1912.

Home	Away	Third

== Transfers ==
=== In ===
P	Name	Age	Moving from	Type	Source
DF	(Brazil) Betão	24	Corinthians	Signed	
MF	(Brazil) Marcinho Guerreiro	27	Metalurh Donetsk (Ukraine)	Loaned	
FW	(Argentina) Trípodi	20	San Martín (Argentina)	Signed	
FW	(Chile) Sebastian Pinto	24	Universidad de Chile	Signed	
FW	(Brazil) Lima	24	Astral	Loaned	
MF	(Colombia) Molina	28	Red Star Belgrade (Serbia)	Signed	
MF	(Ecuador) Quiñónez	23	ESPOLI (Ecuador)	Signed	
DF	(Brazil) Evaldo	25	FC Tokyo (Japan)	Loaned	
GK	(Brazil) Douglas	25	Sertãozinho	Signed	
MF	(Brazil) Luiz Henrique	22	Paulista	Signed	
DF	(Brazil) Fabão	31	Kashima Antlers (Japan)	Signed	
DF	(Brazil) Fabiano	26	Itabaiana	Signed	
FW	(Brazil) Fabiano	23	Sport	Loan Return	
MF	(Brazil) Bida	23	Vitória	Loaned	
MF	(Brazil) Robinho	20	Mogi Mirim	Signed	
DF	(Brazil) Apodi	21	Cruzeiro	Loaned	
DF	(Brazil) Fabiano Eller	30	Atlético Madrid (Spain)	Signed	
FW	(Brazil) Maikon Leite	19	Santo André	Signed	
MF	(Brazil) Michael	25	Dynamo Kyiv (Ukraine)	Loaned	
MF	(Brazil) Roberto Brum	29	Braga (Portugal)	Signed	
DF	(Brazil) Fábio Santos	22	AS Monaco (France)	Loaned	
DF	(Brazil) Pará	22	Santo André	Signed	
FW	(Paraguay) Nelson Cuevas	28	Libertad (Paraguay)	Signed	
DF	(Brazil) Wendel	26	Palmeiras	Loaned	
FW	(Brazil) Reginaldo	26	Sport	Signed	

=== Out ===
P	Name	Age	Moving to	Type	Source
FW	(Brazil) Geílson	23	Atlético–PR	Contract terminated	
FW	(Brazil) Luciano Henrique	28	Sport	End of contract	
DF	(Brazil) Baiano	29	Free Agent	End of contract	
MF	(Serbia) Petković	35	Free Agent	End of contract	
DF	(Brazil) Leonardo	22	Shakhtar Donetsk (Ukraine)	Loan expiration	
DF	(Brazil) Antônio Carlos	38		Retirement	
FW	(Brazil) Marcos Aurélio	24	Shimizu S-Pulse (Japan)	End of contract	
MF	(Brazil) Alex William	20	Free Agent	End of contract	
MF	(Brazil) Pedrinho	30	Al Ain FC (United Arab Emirates)	End of contract	
DF	(Brazil) Dênis	24	Free Agent	Contract terminated	
MF	(Chile) Maldonado	28	Fenerbahçe (Turkey)	Transferred	
FW	(Brazil) Alemão	19	Udinese (Italy)	End of contract	
DF	(Brazil) Alessandro	29	Corinthians	End of contract	
DF	(Brazil) Betão	24	Dynamo Kyiv (Ukraine)	Swapped	
FW	(Brazil) Renatinho	20	Rentistas (Uruguay)	Contract terminated	
FW	(Chile) Sebastián Pinto	22	Free Agent	Contract terminated	
MF	(Brazil) Rodrigo Tabata	27	Gaziantepspor (Turkey)	Transferred	
MF	(Brazil) Luiz Henrique	22	Free Agent	Contract terminated	
DF	(Brazil) Evaldo	25	Coritiba	Contract terminated	
MF	(Brazil) Marcinho Guerreiro	27	Metalurh Donetsk (Ukraine)	Loan expiration	
DF	(Brazil) Marcelo	20	Wisła Kraków (Poland)	End of contract	
DF	(Brazil) Apodi	21	São Caetano	Contract terminated	
DF	(Brazil) Thiago Carleto	19	Valencia (Spain)	Transferred	
FW	(Brazil) Moraes	21	Santo André	End of contract	

=== Out on loan ===
P	Name	Age	Moving to	Source
FW	(Brazil) Moraes	19	Ponte Preta	
DF	(Brazil) Carlinhos	21	Cruzeiro	
FW	(Brazil) Vitor Júnior	21	Kawasaki Frontale (Japan)	
DF	(Brazil) Vinicius Simon	21	Boavista	
FW	(Argentina) Mariano Trípodi	20	Vitória	
DF	(Brazil) Filipi Souza	21	Oeste	

== Competitions ==
=== Overall summary ===
Competition	Started round	Final position / round	First match	Last match
Campeonato Brasileiro	—	15th	11 May	7 December
Campeonato Paulista	First stage	7th	16 January	6 April
Copa Libertadores	Group stage	Quarter-finals	13 February	22 May

Updated to match played 7 December 2008
Source: Competitions

=== Detailed overall summary ===
	Total	Home	Away
Games played	67	34	33
Games won	26	21	5
Games drawn	17	8	9
Games lost	24	5	19
Biggest win	7–0 v San José	7–0 v San José	2–0 v Cúcuta
Biggest loss	1–5 v Coritiba	0–4 v Goiás	1–5 v Coritiba
Clean sheets	25	15	10
Goals scored	90	67	23
Goals conceded	84	32	52
Goal difference	+6	+35	−29
Average GF per game	1.34	1.97	0.7
Average GA per game	1.25	0.94	1.58
Most appearances	Kléber Pereira (60)	–	–
Top scorer	Kléber Pereira (40)	–	–
Worst discipline	Domingos (yellow card) (17) (red card) (3)	–	–
Points	95/201 (47.26%)	71/102 (69.61%)	24/99 (24.24%)
Winning rate	(38.81%)	(61.76%)	(15.15%)

Last updated: 7 December 2008
Source: Competitive matches

=== Campeonato Brasileiro ===
==== League table ====
Pos	Team	Pld	W	D	L	GF	GA	GD	Pts	Qualification or relegation
13	Atlético Paranaense	38	12	9	17	45	54	−9	45	Copa Sudamericana 2009
14	Fluminense	38	11	12	15	49	48	+1	45	Copa Sudamericana 2009
15	Santos	38	11	12	15	44	53	−9	45	
16	Náutico	38	11	11	16	44	54	−10	44	
17	Figueirense	38	11	11	16	49	72	−23	44	Relegation to Série B

Source: rsssfbrasil.com
Rules for classification: 1) points; 2) goal difference; 3) number of goals scored.

==== Results summary ====
Overall								Home						Away					
Pld	W	D	L	GF	GA	GD	Pts	W	D	L	GF	GA	GD	W	D	L	GF	GA	GD
38	11	12	15	44	53	−9	45	9	6	4	34	21	+13	2	6	11	10	32	−22

Last updated: 7 December 2008.
Source: Competitive matches

==== Results by round ====
Round	1	2	3	4	5	6	7	8	9	10	11	12	13	14	15	16	17	18	19	20	21	22	23	24	25	26	27	28	29	30	31	32	33	34	35	36	37	38
Ground	A	H	A	H	A	A	H	A	A	H	H	A	H	A	H	A	H	H	A	H	A	H	A	H	H	A	H	H	A	A	H	A	H	A	H	A	A	H
Result	L	W	L	D	L	D	L	D	L	D	D	L	W	L	W	W	L	L	L	D	D	W	D	W	W	L	D	W	L	W	W	D	L	L	W	L	D	D
Position	17	7	14	14	17	17	18	17	18	18	19	19	19	19	18	17	18	18	18	19	19	19	19	16	14	14	14	13	13	13	12	12	12	13	13	14	14	15

Updated to match(es) played on 7 December 2008. Source: Futpédia
A = Away; H = Home; W = Win; D = Draw; L = Loss

==== Matches ====
11 May 1	Flamengo	3–1	Santos	Rio de Janeiro
16:00 UTC−03:00	Marcinho 28'; Ibson 30'; Juan 75'	Report	90+1' (pen.) Moraes	Stadium: Maracanã; Referee: Heber Roberto Lopes

18 May 2	Santos	4–0	Ipatinga	Santos
18:30 UTC−03:00	Kléber 60'; Kléber Pereira 66', 69', 80' (pen.)	Report		Stadium: Vila Belmiro; Attendance: 2,396; Referee: Evandro Rogério Roman

25 May 3	Cruzeiro	4–0	Santos	Belo Horizonte
16:00 UTC−03:00	Guilherme 18', 73'; Wágner 69'; Maicosuel 78'	Report		Stadium: Mineirão; Attendance: 19,291; Referee: Sérgio da Silva Carvalho

1 June 4	Santos	0–0	São Paulo	Santos
16:00 UTC−03:00		Report		Stadium: Vila Belmiro; Attendance: 7,298; Referee: Leonardo Gaciba

8 June 5	Vitória	1–0	Santos	Salvador
18:30 UTC−03:00	Dinei 25'	Report		Stadium: Barradão; Attendance: 14,657; Referee: Marcelo de Lima Henrique

12 June 6	Fluminense	1–1	Santos	Rio de Janeiro
20:30 UTC−03:00	Washington 6'	Report	90+1' Tiago Luís	Stadium: Maracanã; Attendance: 6,539; Referee: Carlos Eugênio Simon

22 June 7	Santos	0–4	Goiás	Santos
16:00 UTC−03:00		Report	7' Alex Terra; 29', 72' (pen.) Iarley; 88' (pen.) Romerito	Stadium: Vila Belmiro; Attendance: 3,848; Referee: Claudio Luciano Mercante Junior

28 June 8	Portuguesa	0–0	Santos	São Paulo
18:20 UTC−03:00		Report		Stadium: Canindé; Attendance: 5,000; Referee: Carlos Eugênio Simon

5 July 9	Atlético–PR	1–0	Santos	Curitiba
18:20 UTC−03:00	Alan Bahia 78'	Report		Stadium: Arena da Baixada; Attendance: 18,180; Referee: Sérgio da Silva Carvalho

9 July 10	Santos	1–1	Grêmio	Santos
16:00 UTC−03:00	Michael 45'	Report	25' Rodrigo Mendes	Stadium: Vila Belmiro; Attendance: 5,739; Referee: Gutemberg de Paula Fonseca

13 July 11	Santos	2–2	Botafogo	Santos
16:00 UTC−03:00	Kléber Pereira 79', 87'	Report	4' Zé Carlos; 17' Wellington Paulista	Stadium: Vila Belmiro; Attendance: 10,088; Referee: Alicio Pena Júnior

16 July 12	Figueirense	3–0	Santos	Florianópolis
20:30 UTC−03:00	Edu Sales 27', 44'; Tadeu 57'	Report		Stadium: Orlando Scarpelli; Attendance: 9,230; Referee: Jaílson Freitas

20 July 13	Santos	1–0	Sport	Santos
16:00 UTC−03:00	Kléber Pereira 44'	Report		Stadium: Vila Belmiro; Attendance: 13,918; Referee: Luiz Alberto Sardinha

24 July 14	Palmeiras	4–2	Santos	São Paulo
20:30 UTC−03:00	Leandro 13', 28'; Alex Mineiro 15'; Gladstone 44'	Report	33' Kléber Pereira; 37' Apodi	Stadium: Parque Antártica; Attendance: 21,339; Referee: José Henrique de Carvalho

27 July 15	Santos	5–2	Vasco	Santos
16:00 UTC−03:00	Molina 17', 89'; Kléber Pereira 31' (pen.), 38' (pen.), 45+3' (pen.)	Report	36' Leandro Amaral; 82' Madson	Stadium: Vila Belmiro; Attendance: 10,738; Referee: Giuliano Bozanno

30 July 16	Internacional	0–1	Santos	Porto Alegre
21:45 UTC−03:00		Report	67' Maikon Leite	Stadium: Beira Rio; Attendance: 19,952; Referee: Djalma Beltrami

3 August 17	Santos	1–3	Coritiba	Santos
18:10 UTC−03:00	Maikon Leite 70'	Report	14', 67', 80' Keirrison	Stadium: Vila Belmiro; Attendance: 10,261; Referee: Pablo dos Santos Alves

6 August 18	Santos	2–3	Atlético Mineiro	Santos
21:45 UTC−03:00	Kléber Pereira 2'; Vinícius 28' (o.g.)	Report	29' Jael; 56' Márcio Araújo; 74' Raphael Aguiar	Stadium: Vila Belmiro; Attendance: 6,657; Referee: Elmo Alves Resende Cunha

10 August 19	Náutico	1–0	Santos	Recife
18:10 UTC−03:00	Negretti 65'	Report		Stadium: Aflitos; Attendance: 13,711; Referee: Djalma Beltrami

17 August 20	Santos	2–2	Flamengo	Santos
16:00 UTC−03:00	Kléber Pereira 37', 51'	Report	6', 77' (pen.) Leonardo Moura	Stadium: Vila Belmiro; Attendance: 15,359; Referee: Heber Roberto Lopes

20 August 21	Ipatinga	1–1	Santos	Ipatinga
22:00 UTC−03:00	Henrique 84'	Report	82' Cuevas	Stadium: Ipatingão; Attendance: 1,066; Referee: Wagner Tardelli Azevedo

24 August 22	Santos	2–0	Cruzeiro	Santos
16:00 UTC−03:00	Kléber Pereira 41', 79'	Report		Stadium: Vila Belmiro; Attendance: 8,563; Referee: Leandro Pedro Vuaden

31 August 23	São Paulo	0–0	Santos	São Paulo
16:00 UTC−03:00		Report		Stadium: Morumbi; Attendance: 14,547; Referee: Carlos Eugênio Simon

3 September 24	Santos	2–0	Vitória	Santos
22:00 UTC−03:00	Kléber Pereira 4', 75'	Report		Stadium: Vila Belmiro; Attendance: 10,061; Referee: Ricardo Marques Ribeiro

14 September 25	Santos	2–1	Fluminense	Santos
18:10 UTC−03:00	Kléber Pereira 45+1'; Bida 79'	Report	90' Romeu	Stadium: Vila Belmiro; Attendance: 11,085; Referee: Carlos Eugênio Simon

20 September 26	Goiás	4–1	Santos	Goiânia
18:20 UTC−03:00	Paulo Baier 1'; Anderson Gomes 3'; Iarley 14' (pen.); Rafael Marques 53'	Report	75' Pará	Stadium: Serra Dourada; Attendance: 9,469; Referee: Leonardo Gaciba

28 September 27	Santos	1–1	Portuguesa	Santos
18:10 UTC−03:00	Kléber Pereira 58'	Report	60' Athirson	Stadium: Vila Belmiro; Attendance: 7,552; Referee: Ednilson Corona

4 October 28	Santos	4–0	Atlético–PR	Santos
18:20 UTC−03:00	Cuevas 1'; Molina 32'; Kléber Pereira 47' (pen.); Fabiano Eller 68'	Report		Stadium: Vila Belmiro; Attendance: 10,053; Referee: Djalma Beltrami

8 October 29	Grêmio	2–0	Santos	Porto Alegre
22:00 UTC−03:00	Morales 2'; Soares 90+4'	Report		Stadium: Olímpico; Attendance: 30,469; Referee: Marcelo de Lima Henrique

18 October 30	Botafogo	0–1	Santos	Rio de Janeiro
18:20 UTC−03:00		Report	71' Molina	Stadium: Engenhão; Attendance: 20,634; Referee: Carlos Eugênio Simon

25 October 31	Santos	3–0	Figueirense	Santos
18:20 UTC−02:00	Molina 38'; Bida 40'; Rodrigo Souto 63'	Report		Stadium: Vila Belmiro; Attendance: 12,573; Referee: Alício Pena Júnior

30 October 32	Sport	1–1	Santos	Recife
20:30 UTC−02:00	Fumagalli 30' (pen.)	Report	45' Kléber Pereira	Stadium: Ilha do Retiro; Referee: Leonardo Gaciba

2 November 33	Santos	1–2	Palmeiras	Santos
17:00 UTC−02:00	Bruno 46' (o.g.)	Report	1' Kléber; 90' Léo Lima	Stadium: Vila Belmiro; Attendance: 14,214; Referee: Wilson Seneme

8 November 34	Vasco	1–0	Santos	Rio de Janeiro
18:30 UTC−02:00	Edmundo 72' (pen.)	Report		Stadium: São Januário; Attendance: 21,310; Referee: Elmo Alves Resende Cunha

16 November 35	Santos	1–0	Internacional	Santos
19:10 UTC−02:00	Gustavo Nery 69' (o.g.)	Report		Stadium: Vila Belmiro; Attendance: 11,731; Referee: Heber Roberto Lopes

22 November 36	Coritiba	5–1	Santos	Curitiba
18:30 UTC−02:00	Keirrison 26', 47', 76' (pen.), 80'; Ariel 69'	Report	55' Molina	Stadium: Couto Pereira; Attendance: 11,455; Referee: Giulliano Bozzano

30 November 37	Atlético Mineiro	0–0	Santos	Belo Horizonte
17:00 UTC−02:00		Report		Stadium: Mineirão; Attendance: 57,391; Referee: Wagner Tardelli

7 December 38	Santos	0–0	Náutico	Santos
17:00 UTC−02:00		Report		Stadium: Vila Belmiro; Attendance: 14,121; Referee: Sérgio da Silva Carvalho

=== Campeonato Paulista ===
==== Results summary ====
Overall								Home						Away					
Pld	W	D	L	GF	GA	GD	Pts	W	D	L	GF	GA	GD	W	D	L	GF	GA	GD
19	9	4	6	28	23	+5	31	7	2	1	20	10	+10	2	2	5	8	13	−5

Last updated: 6 April 2008.
Source: Competitive matches

==== First stage ====
===== League table =====
Pos	Team	Pld	W	D	L	GF	GA	GD	Pts	Qualification or relegation
5	Corinthians	19	9	6	4	24	15	+9	33	
6	Barueri	19	10	2	7	34	24	+10	32	Qualification for Campeonato do Interior
7	Santos	19	9	4	6	28	23	+5	31	
8	Mirassol	19	9	2	8	29	28	+1	29	Qualification for Campeonato do Interior
9	Noroeste	19	8	5	6	29	23	+6	29	Qualification for Campeonato do Interior

Updated to match(es) played on April 6, 2008. Source: RSSSF Brazil
Rules for classification: 1st points; 2nd wins; 3rd goal difference; 4th goals scored

===== Matches =====
16 January 1	Portuguesa	2–0	Santos	São Paulo
21:45 UTC−02:00	Christian 12'; Marcelo 83'	Report		Stadium: Morumbi; Attendance: 11,904; Referee: Rodrigo Braghetto

20 January 2	Santos	0–0	Palmeiras	Santos
16:00 UTC−02:00		Report		Stadium: Vila Belmiro; Attendance: 11,407; Referee: José Henrique de Carvalho

24 January 3	Juventus	3–1	Santos	Santo André
19:30 UTC−02:00	João Paulo 6', 48'; Lima 63'	Report	89' Marcinho Guerreiro	Stadium: Bruno José Daniel; Attendance: 4,582; Referee: Flávio Rodrigues Guerra

27 January 4	Santos	2–0	Bragantino	Santos
18:10 UTC−02:00	Tiago Luís 34'; Kléber 82'	Report		Stadium: Vila Belmiro; Attendance: 4,716; Referee: Rodrigo Martins Cintra

30 January 5	Santos	1–2	Grêmio Barueri	Santos
20:30 UTC−02:00	Rodrigo Tabata 84'	Report	25' Alex Maranhão; 88' Thiago Humberto	Stadium: Vila Belmiro; Attendance: 4,329; Referee: Otávio Corrêa da Silva

3 February 6	Paulista	1–1	Santos	Jundiaí
18:10 UTC−02:00	Thiago 37'	Report	33' Alemão	Stadium: Jayme Cintra; Attendance: 5,720; Referee: Marcelo Aparecido de Souza

7 February 7	Santos	1–0	Marília	Santos
20:30 UTC−02:00	Kléber Pereira 82'	Report		Stadium: Vila Belmiro; Attendance: 3,263; Referee: Milton Ballerini

10 February 8	São Paulo	3–2	Santos	São Paulo
16:00 UTC−02:00	Fábio Santos 19'; Juninho 48'; Carlos Alberto 86'	Report	15' Kléber Pereira; 57' Rodrigo Souto	Stadium: Morumbi; Attendance: 17,595; Referee: Antonio Rogério Batista do Prado

17 February 9	Rio Preto	2–1	Santos	São José do Rio Preto
18:10 UTC−02:00	Rafael Lomas 51'; Ricardinho 60'	Report	68' Renatinho	Stadium: Anísio Haddad; Attendance: 6,042; Referee: Wilson Seneme

21 February 10	Santos	3–1	Guarani	Santos
20:30 UTC−03:00	Kléber Pereira 16', 74'; Wesley 44'	Report	55' (pen.) Paulo Santos	Stadium: Vila Belmiro; Attendance: 3,469; Referee: Rodrigo Guarizo Ferreira do Amaral

24 February 11	Santos	4–1	Ituano	Santos
18:10 UTC−03:00	Molina 8'; Kleber Pereira 53', 87'; Betão 66'	Report	17' Alex Afonso	Stadium: Vila Belmiro; Attendance: 3,293; Referee: José Henrique de Carvalho

1 March 12	Sertãozinho	1–0	Santos	Sertãozinho
18:10 UTC−03:00	Hugo 42'	Report		Stadium: Fredericão; Attendance: 8,584; Referee: Luiz Flávio de Oliveira

9 March 13	Santos	3–2	Noroeste	Santos
18:10 UTC−03:00	Betão 3'; Kleber Pereira 20', 65' (pen.)	Report	34' Edno; 55' Leandrinho	Stadium: Vila Belmiro; Attendance: 12,537; Referee: Guilherme Cereta de Lima

13 March 14	Santos	2–1	Mirassol	Santos
20:30 UTC−03:00	Marcinho Guerreiro 83'; Kleber Pereira 87' (pen.)	Report	81' Léo Mineiro	Stadium: Vila Belmiro; Attendance: 3,841; Referee: Antônio Rogério Batista do Prado

16 March 15	São Caetano	0–1	Santos	Santo André
16:00 UTC−03:00		Report	29' Kleber Pereira	Stadium: Bruno José Daniel; Attendance: 4,589; Referee: Marco Antonio de Oliveira Sá

23 March 16	Guaratinguetá	0–1	Santos	Guaratinguetá
18:10 UTC−03:00		Report	85' Marcinho Guerreiro	Stadium: Ninho da Garça; Attendance: 7,957; Referee: Milton Etsuo Ballerini

26 March 17	Santos	2–1	Corinthians	Santos
21:45 UTC−03:00	Sebastian Pinto 15'; Kleber Pereira 82'	Report	47' Carlão	Stadium: Vila Belmiro; Attendance: 15,270; Referee: Sálvio Spínola Fagundes Filho

29 March 18	Rio Claro	1–1	Santos	Rio Claro
18:10 UTC−03:00	Mirandinha 41'	Report	11' Kleber Pereira	Stadium: Schmidtão; Attendance: 5,663; Referee: Flávio Rodrigues Guerra

6 April 19	Santos	2–2	Ponte Preta	Santos
16:00 UTC−03:00	Kleber Pereira 10'; Renatinho 88'	Report	35' Luis Ricardo; 58' Renato Cajá	Stadium: Vila Belmiro; Attendance: 4,449; Referee: Eduardo César Coronado Coelho

=== Copa Libertadores ===
==== Group stage ====
Pos	Team	Pld	W	D	L	GF	GA	GD	Pts
1	(Colombia) Cúcuta Deportivo	6	3	2	1	7	4	+3	11
2	(Brazil) Santos	6	3	1	2	13	6	+7	10
3	(Mexico) Guadalajara	6	3	0	3	8	5	+3	9
4	(Bolivia) San José	6	1	1	4	4	17	−13	4

13 February 1	Cúcuta Deportivo (Colombia)	0–0	(Brazil) Santos	Cúcuta
21:10 UTC−05:00		Report		Stadium: General Santander

4 March 2	Santos (Brazil)	1–0	(Mexico) Guadalajara	Santos
21:50 UTC−03:00	Molina 22'	Report		Stadium: Vila Belmiro

19 March 3	San José (Bolivia)	2–1	(Brazil) Santos	Oruro
20:50 UTC−04:00	Cerutti 12'; García 61'	Report	7' Kléber Pereira	Stadium: Jesús Bermúdez

1 April 4	Santos (Brazil)	7–0	(Bolivia) San José	Santos
20:30 UTC−03:00	Domingos 18'; Molina 23', 33', 64', 86'; Kléber Pereira 79'; Quiñónez 81'	Report		Stadium: Vila Belmiro

9 April 5	Guadalajara (Mexico)	3–2	(Brazil) Santos	Zapopan
18:50 UTC−06:00	Arellano 13'; Rodríguez 34'; Santana 46'	Report	39' Kléber Pereira; 55' Kléber	Stadium: Omnilife

16 April 6	Santos (Brazil)	2–1	(Colombia) Cúcuta	Santos
21:50 UTC−03:00	Kléber Pereira 69'; Trípodi 89'	Report	22' Henry	Stadium: Vila Belmiro

==== Knockout stage ====
===== Round of 16 =====
1 May 1st Leg	Santos (Brazil)	2–0	(Colombia) Cúcuta	Santos
20:45 UTC−03:00	Lima 18'; Molina 71'	Report		Stadium: Vila Belmiro; Attendance: 17,282; Referee: Marco Rodríguez (México)

8 May 2nd Leg	Cúcuta (Colombia)	0–2 (0–4 agg.)	(Brazil) Santos	Cúcuta
21:15 UTC−05:00		Report	40' Kléber Pereira; 53' Lima	Stadium: General Santander; Referee: Carlos Amarilla (Paraguay)

===== Quarter-finals =====
15 May 1st Leg	América (Mexico)	2–0	(Brazil) Santos	México DF
18:20 UTC−06:00	Cabañas 25', 62'	Report		Stadium: Estadio Azteca; Attendance: 105,000; Referee: Héctor Baldassi (Argentina)

22 May 2nd Leg	Santos (Brazil)	1–0 (1–2 agg.)	(Mexico) América	Santos
21:50 UTC−03:00	Kléber Pereira 62'	Report		Stadium: Vila Belmiro; Attendance: 19,539; Referee: Jorge Larrionda (Uruguay)
