= Alemão (footballer, born 1989) =

Brazilian footballer (born 1989)

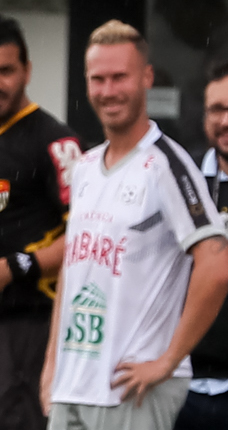
- Alemão in 2020

Personal information
- Full name: José Carlos Tofolo Júnior
- Date of birth: 2 March 1989 (age 37)
- Place of birth: Valinhos, Brazil
- Height: 1.85 m (6 ft 1 in)
- Position: Forward

Team information
- Current team: Monte Azul (head coach)

Youth career
- 2003–2008: Santos

Senior career*
Years	Team	Apps	(Gls)
2008–2009	Santos	4	(1)
2009–2010	Udinese	0	(0)
2010–2012	Vicenza	21	(2)
2011	→ Varese (loan)	6	(1)
2012	→ Grêmio Catanduvense (loan)	12	(2)
2012	→ Guaratinguetá (loan)	25	(14)
2013–2014	Ponte Preta	37	(9)
2013	→ Vitória (loan)	9	(1)
2014	→ Chapecoense (loan)	4	(1)
2014	→ Portuguesa (loan)	8	(1)
2015–2016	Cruz Azul	14	(3)
2015–2016	→ Figueirense (loan)	4	(0)
2016	ABC	4	(1)
2016	Botafogo-SP	15	(7)
2016–2017	FC Eindhoven	21	(5)
2017–2019	Paraná	27	(7)
2018	→ Busan IPark (loan)	8	(2)
2018	→ CSA (loan)	12	(0)
2019	→ Ituano (loan)	4	(0)
2020	Guarani	13	(0)
2021	America-RJ	6	(1)
2021	Jaraguá	5	(0)
2021–2023	Maringá	38	(8)
2021	→ Goianésia (loan)	4	(0)
2022	→ Confiança (loan)	0	(0)
Total		301	(66)

Managerial career
- 2024–: Monte Azul
- * Club domestic league appearances and goals

José Carlos Tofolo Júnior, commonly known as Alemão (born 2 March 1989), is a Brazilian football coach and former player who played as a forward. He is the current head coach of Monte Azul.

Alemão also holds Italian nationality.

== Club career ==
=== Early career ===
Alemão started his career at Santos, and signed a professional contract with club in 2005. He made his first team debut on 31 January 2008, starting in a 1–2 Campeonato Paulista loss against Grêmio Barueri, due to Kléber Pereira's injury. Alemão scored his first goal for Peixe four days later, in a 1–1 draw against Paulista.

=== Udinese/Varese and loans ===
In July 2008 he was signed by Serie A club Udinese on a reported free transfer, with performance based fees. However, Alemão was not registered in Lega Calcio as the club did not have an extra non-EU signing quota (Udinese signed Ricardo Chará, Dušan Basta, Alexis Sánchez and Odion Ighalo that season but only the last 2 were officially registered in the League Office). Santos also submitted a new contract to Brazilian Football Confederation BID-E system to document a new contract which last until 2011 on 28 July. Alemão was only officially signed for Udinese in June 2009, and never appeared for Santos neither in 2008 Campeonato Brasileiro Série A nor 2009 Campeonato Paulista, due to a dispute with the club's board.

With Udinese, Alemão played for its Primavera under-20 team as an overage player. In July 2010 he was sold to Serie B club Vicenza in co-ownership deal, for €400,000. Alemão made his debut abroad on 20 August 2010, replacing Alain Baclet in the 66th minute of a 0–2 Serie B loss against Atalanta.

On 31 January 2011, he was swapped with Marco Cellini of Varese. In June 2011 Udinese gave up the remain 50% registration rights for free.

=== Back to Brazil ===
In January 2012 Alemão returned to Brazil, signing a temporary deal with Grêmio Catanduvense. He moved to Guaratinguetá until December in mid-2012. After scoring regularly he moved to neighbouring Ponte Preta.

After only appearing sparingly in 2013 Série A, Alemão was loaned to fellow league team Vitória. He subsequently was loaned to Chapecoense and Portuguesa in the following year, he scored 8 goals in total in Serie league and State league.

=== Cruz Azul ===
On 12 December 2014 Alemão signed for Liga MX side Cruz Azul. He got 3 goals and 4 assists during 14 games but Figueirense wants him to play in the club as loan.

=== Second Return to Brazil ===
In 2015, he returned to Brazil again for Figueirense. He then signed by ABC and Ribeirão Preto based Botafogo-SP.

=== FC Eindhoven ===
In 2016, he moved to Europe again for Dutch club FC Eindhoven.

== Honours ==
ABC

- Campeonato Potiguar: 2016

Monte Azul

- Copa Paulista: 2024
