= Luizinho (footballer, born 1982) =

Brazilian footballer

Personal information
- Full name: Luiz Antônio de Oliveira
- Date of birth: November 5, 1982 (age 43)
- Place of birth: Divinópolis, Brazil
- Height: 1.70 m (5 ft 7 in)
- Positions: Right back; left back

Youth career
- 2001–2003: Guarani-MG

Senior career*
Years	Team	Apps	(Gls)
2003	Villa Nova		
2004	URT-MG		
2004–2005	Ipatinga		
2005–2006	Nacional	6	(0)
2006	Cruzeiro		
2006	→ Santa Cruz (loan)		
2006	→ Ipatinga (loan)		
2007–2008	→ Flamengo (loan)	14	(0)
2009–2009	→ Santos (loan)	14	(1)
2010	Cruzeiro		
2011	Ipatinga	27	(1)
2011	Villa Nova	16	(0)
2012	Guarani-MG		
2012	Brasiliense		
- * Club domestic league appearances and goals as of August 5, 2011

Luiz Antônio de Oliveira or simply Luizinho (born November 5, 1982, in Divinópolis), is a Brazilian right back.

== Career ==
=== Honours ===
- Campeonato Mineiro Módulo II: 2002
- Minas Gerais Cup: 2004
- Campeonato Mineiro: 2005, 2006
- Taça Guanabara: 2007, 2008
- Campeonato Carioca: 2007, 2008

=== Statistics ===
(Correct as of November 30, 2008)

Club	Season	Carioca League			Brazilian Série A			Brazilian Cup			Copa Libertadores			Total		
Club	Season	Apps	Goals	Assists	Apps	Goals	Assists	Apps	Goals	Assists	Apps	Goals	Assists	Apps	Goals	Assists
Flamengo	2007	4	0	?	5	0	?	-	-	-	-	-	-	9	0	1
Flamengo	2008	6	0	1	9	0	0	-	-	-	2	0	0	17	0	1

according to combined sources on the Flamengo official website and Flaestatística.
