= Laio =

Brazilian footballer

Personal information
- Full name: Laio Azeredo dos Santos
- Date of birth: 2 May 1989 (age 37)
- Place of birth: Campos dos Goytacazes, Brazil
- Height: 1.84 m (6 ft 0 in)
- Position: Striker

Team information
- Current team: Itapemirim

Senior career*
Years	Team	Apps	(Gls)
2009	Botafogo	8	(2)
2010	Macaé	2	(0)
2011	Democrata	0	(0)
2012	Duque de Caxias	0	(0)
2012	Gloria Bistrița	14	(1)
2013	Goytacaz	0	(0)
2014	Central	0	(0)
2014	Itabiana	0	(0)
2014	Estrella	6	(1)
2015	São João da Barra	0	(0)
2016	Paragominas	0	(0)
2016–	Itapemirim		
- * Club domestic league appearances and goals as of 22 May 2020

Laio Azeredo dos Santos (born 2 May 1989), simply knowns as Laio or Layo, is a Brazilian footballer, who plays as a center forward for Itapemirim.

== Career ==
=== Early career ===
Laio spent most of his early years playing in his native Brazil. During the 2009 Série A season, he managed to score two times in eight appearances for Botafogo.

=== Gloria Bistrița ===
In the summer of 2012, he agreed to join the Romanian team Gloria Bistrița. He made his debut in a match against Astra Ploiești which concluded in a defeat. He scored his first goal in an official match at Gloria Bistrița in a draw against Petrolul Ploiești. He entered the field, then his first touch was a goal.
