= Cristian (footballer, born 1990) =

Brazilian footballer

Personal information
- Full name: Cristian Porto Spricigo
- Date of birth: August 7, 1990 (age 36)
- Place of birth: Araranguá, Brazil
- Height: 1.75 m (5 ft 9 in)
- Position: Striker

Team information
- Current team: S.E.R. Guarani

Youth career
- 2006: Atlético Paranaense
- 2007–2009: Avaí

Senior career*
Years	Team	Apps	(Gls)
2008–2015	Avaí	44	(9)
2011	→ Marília (loan)	20	(10)
2011–present	→ S.E.R. Guarani (loan)	50	(28)
- * Club domestic league appearances and goals as of October 16, 2010 ‡ National team caps and goals as of October 16, 2010

Cristian Porto Spricigo (born August 7, 1990), known professionally as Cristian, is a striker who plays for S.E.R. Guarani on loan from Avaí. He began his career in the youth teams of Atlético Paranaense in 2006, where he remained for that year only.

== Career ==
He moved to the youth system of Avaí in 2007 and soon reached prominence in the club of Santa Catarina. By 2008, he was integrated into the group's professional club where he played with the Avaí B team, Copa Santa Catarina. At the beginning of 2009, he participated prominently in the campaign of Avaí in the Copa São Paulo de Futebol Júnior and participated in 13 games for the club in the Brazilian Championship, recording three goals in the competition.

For the 2010 season, became a primary weapon in Avaí to the state championship and national levels.

=== Career statistics ===
(Correct as of October 16, 2010)

Club	Season	State League		Brazilian Série A		Copa do Brasil		Copa Sudamericana		Total	
Club	Season	Apps	Goals	Apps	Goals	Apps	Goals	Apps	Goals	Apps	Goals
Avaí	2008	-	-	-	-	-	-	-	-	4	1
Avaí	2009	-	-	13	3	-	-	-	-	13	3
Avaí	2010	?	?	5	0	-	-	-	-	27	5
Total		?	?	?	?	-	-	-	-	44	9

== Honours ==
Atlético Paranaense

- Campeonato Paranaense Juvenil: 2006

Avaí

- Campeonato Catarinense: 2009, 2010
