= Luiz Henrique (footballer, born 1985) =

Brazilian footballer

Personal information
- Full name: Luiz Henrique de Oliveira
- Date of birth: September 3, 1985 (age 41)
- Place of birth: São Paulo, Brazil
- Height: 1.79 m (5 ft 10 in)
- Position: Attacking midfielder

Team information
- Current team: XV de Jaú
- Number: 10

Youth career
- 2003: Paulista

Senior career*
Years	Team	Apps	(Gls)
2004–2007	Paulista		
2007	América-SP		
2008	Santos	0	(0)
2008–2009	Al-Shaab	3	(0)
2010–2010	Tigres do Brasil	6	(0)
2010	Penapolense	15	(2)
2011–2013	LASK Linz	32	(6)
2014–2014	E.C. Taubaté	5	(1)
2014–2014	Đồng Nai	20	(7)
2014	Guarani	6	(0)
2015–2015	Can Tho	11	(1)
2015–2015	Velo Clube	12	(2)
2015–2015	Caldense	6	(0)
2016–2016	Velo Clube	18	(0)
2016–2016	XV de Jaú	9	(4)
2017–2017	Desportivo Brasil		
2018–2019	Velo Clube		
- * Club domestic league appearances and goals

Luiz Henrique de Oliveira or simply Luiz Henrique (born 3 September 1985 in São Paulo) is a Brazilian attacking midfielder who plays for Velo Clube in the Brazilian Campeonato Paulista de Futebol .
