= Lúcio Flávio (footballer, born 1979) =

Brazilian footballer

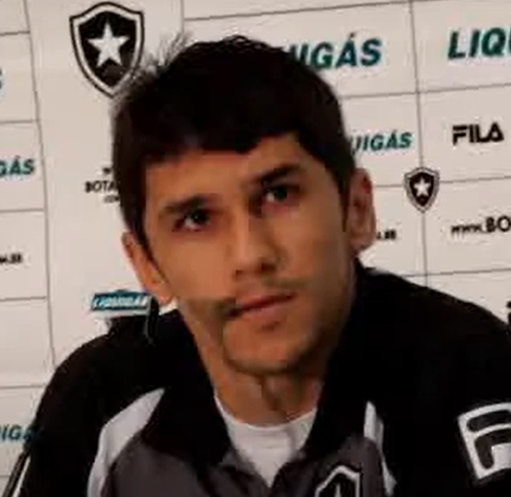
- Lúcio Flávio as Botafogo player in 2009

Personal information
- Full name: Lúcio Flávio dos Santos
- Date of birth: 3 February 1979 (age 47)
- Place of birth: Curitiba, Brazil
- Height: 1.75 m (5 ft 9 in)
- Position: Attacking midfielder

Team information
- Current team: Marcílio Dias (head coach)

Youth career
- 1994–1998: Paraná

Senior career*
Years	Team	Apps	(Gls)
1997–2003	Paraná	36	(9)
1999	→ Internacional (loan)	10	(0)
2002	→ São Paulo (loan)	0	(0)
2002	→ Coritiba (loan)	25	(6)
2003	→ Atlético Mineiro (loan)	42	(8)
2004–2005	São Caetano	33	(3)
2005	→ Al-Ahli (loan)	0	(0)
2006–2008	Botafogo	96	(28)
2008–2009	Santos	9	(0)
2009–2010	Botafogo	76	(10)
2011	Atlas	12	(0)
2011–2012	Vitória	35	(4)
2012–2015	Paraná	125	(14)
2015	Coritiba	25	(0)
2016	ABC	34	(5)
2017	Joinville	22	(3)

Managerial career
- 2018–2020: Paraná (assistant)
- 2020–2021: Botafogo (assistant)
- 2021: Botafogo (interim)
- 2022–2023: Botafogo U23
- 2022: Botafogo (interim)
- 2023: Botafogo (interim)
- 2024: Aparecidense
- 2025: São Joseense
- 2025: Aparecidense
- 2026: Goiatuba
- 2026: Uberlândia
- 2026–: Marcílio Dias
- * Club domestic league appearances and goals

Lúcio Flávio dos Santos (born 3 February 1979), known as Lúcio Flávio, is a Brazilian football coach and former player who played as an attacking midfielder. He is the current head coach of Marcílio Dias.

== Playing career ==
Born in Curitiba, Paraná, Lúcio Flávio was a Paraná Clube youth graduate. He made his first team debut during the 1997 season, and subsequently became an important unit as the side finished second in the 1999 Copa Sul-Minas.

On 26 July 1999, after renewing his contract, Lúcio Flávio moved on loan to Internacional until the end of the year. After playing rarely, he returned to his parent club ahead of the 2000 season, and lifted the Copa João Havelange Group Yellow in the campaign.

Lúcio Flávio moved to São Paulo for the 2002 season, but failed to impress and joined Coritiba on 17 July 2002. In 2003, still owned by Paraná, he represented Atlético Mineiro.

In January 2004, Lúcio Flávio terminated his contract with Paraná due to unpaid wages, and agreed to a one-year deal with São Caetano. In 2005, he spent six months abroad on loan at Saudi Arabia's Al-Ahli FC, before joining Botafogo also in a temporary deal on 13 December of that year.

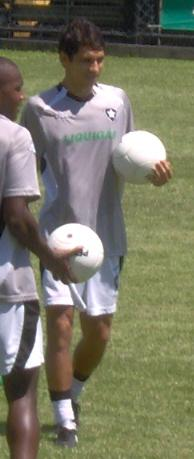
Lúcio Flávio training with Botafogo in 2009

After agreeing to a permanent deal with Bota for the 2007 campaign, Lúcio Flávio was a regular starter for the club before signing a two-year contract with Santos on 18 December 2008. After failing to adapt, he returned to his previous club in May 2009, being again a first-choice before joining Liga MX side Atlas on 7 December 2010.

Transfer listed by the Mexican side in June 2011, Lúcio Flávio returned to Brazil in the following month, after signing for Vitória. He left the latter roughly one year later, and returned to his first club Paraná.

Lúcio Flávio left Paraná in June 2015, after the expiry of his contract, and moved to another club he already represented, Coritiba. In the following two seasons, he played for ABC and Joinville, retiring with the latter in 2017 at the age of 38.

== Coaching career ==
After retiring, Lúcio Flávio worked briefly as a sports commentator before returning to his first club Paraná in October 2018, as an assistant coach. He was also an interim for one match during the 2020 Campeonato Paranaense, as manager Allan Aal was suspended.

On 20 October 2020, Lúcio Flávio returned to Botafogo, as an assistant coach of Bruno Lazaroni. The following 6 February, after the dismissal of Eduardo Barroca, he was named interim manager for the remainder of the 2020 Campeonato Brasileiro Série A, with the club already relegated.

In 2022, Lúcio Flávio became the head coach of the under-23 team, being an interim in the main squad after the departure of Enderson Moreira. In the 2023 Série A, he was again named interim head coach, after the dismissal of Bruno Lage; former player Joel Carli also served as his assistant.

On 14 November 2023, after only two wins in eight matches while in charge of Bota, Lúcio Flávio was removed from the interim role and dismissed from his assistant role. On 9 February 2024, he was named head coach of Aparecidense, but was sacked on 7 July.

== Managerial statistics ==
As of 9 July 2024.

Managerial record by team and tenure
Team	Nat	From	To	Record								Ref
Team	Nat	From	To	G	W	D	L	GF	GA	GD	Win %	Ref
Paraná (interim)	(Brazil)	2 February 2020	2 February 2020	1	0	1	0	1	1	+0	0.00	
Botafogo (interim)	(Brazil)	6 February 2021	26 February 2021	4	1	0	3	4	9	−5	25.00	
Botafogo (interim)	(Brazil)	11 February 2022	27 March 2022	7	3	1	3	14	12	+2	42.86	
Botafogo (interim)	(Brazil)	3 October 2023	14 November 2023	8	2	2	4	13	14	−1	25.00	
Aparecidense	(Brazil)	9 February 2024	7 July 2024	19	6	5	8	25	25	+0	31.58	
Total				39	12	9	18	57	61	−4	30.77	—

== Honours ==
=== Player ===
Paraná

- Campeonato Brasileiro Série B: 2000

São Caetano

- Campeonato Paulista: 2004

Botafogo

- Campeonato Carioca: 2006, 2010
- Taça Guanabara: 2006, 2010
- Taça Rio: 2007, 2008, 2010

ABC

- Campeonato Potiguar: 2016
