= Marcinho Guerreiro (footballer, born 1980) =

Brazilian footballer

Personal information
- Full name: Márcio Glad
- Date of birth: 23 September 1980 (age 46)
- Place of birth: Novo Horizonte, Brazil
- Height: 1.78 m (5 ft 10 in)
- Position: Midfielder

Youth career
- 1998: Novorizontino
- 1999: Olímpia

Senior career*
Years	Team	Apps	(Gls)
2000	Matonense		
2000	Guaratinguetá		
2001	Gama		
2002–2003	Figueirense		
2003–2007	Palmeiras		
2007–2008	Metalurh Donetsk	12	(1)
2008	→ Santos (loan)		
2008–2009	Murcia		
2010–2012	Avaí		
2011	→ Goiás (loan)		
2012	→ CRB (loan)		
2013	Ituano		
2013	CRB		
2014–2015	Santo André		
2015–2016	CSA		
- * Club domestic league appearances and goals as of 27 October 2018

Márcio Glad (born 23 September 1980 in Novo Horizonte, São Paulo), commonly known as Marcinho Guerreiro, is a Brazilian footballer who plays for Esporte Clube Santo André as a defensive midfielder.

== Football career ==
During his early career, Guerreiro rarely settled with a club, representing Sociedade Esportiva Matonense, Guaratinguetá Futebol, Sociedade Esportiva do Gama and Figueirense Futebol Clube. In 2003, he established at Sociedade Esportiva Palmeiras, moving to FC Metalurh Donetsk in Ukraine after four years but returning unsettled to Brazil shortly after, joining Santos FC on loan.

In November 2008, while at Real Murcia in the Spanish second division, Guerreiro assaulted the referee in a 3–5 loss at Xerez CD, after a penalty kick was awarded to the opposition and he was sent off for a second bookable offense. He was banned with four games, and fined by the club.

In October 2009, Guerreiro returned to his country, signing with for one year with Avaí Futebol Clube.

== Honours ==
- Santa Catarina State League: 2002, 2003
- Brazilian Second Division: 2003
