= Triguinho =

Brazilian footballer

Personal information
- Full name: Luciano da Silva
- Date of birth: 25 February 1979 (age 47)
- Place of birth: Piquete, Brazil
- Height: 1.77 m (5 ft 10 in)
- Position: Left back

Youth career
- 1998–1999: Guaratinguetá

Senior career*
Years	Team	Apps	(Gls)
1999–2001	Guaratinguetá		
2001	Barcelona B		
2002–2003	Figueirense	30	(0)
2004–2010	São Caetano	90	(6)
2007	→ Anderlecht (loan)	0	(0)
2008	→ Botafogo (loan)	14	(0)
2009	→ Santos (loan)	29	(1)
2010	→ Coritiba (loan)	22	(3)
2011	Coritiba	3	(0)
2011	→ Atlético Mineiro (loan)	16	(0)
2012	Atlético Mineiro	3	(0)
2013	Red Bull Brasil	6	(0)
2014	Manthiqueira		
Total		213	(10)
- * Club domestic league appearances and goals

Luciano da Silva or simply Triguinho (born 25 February 1979), is a Brazilian former football left back.

== Career ==
Starting his career at Guaratinguetá, Triguinho had a brief spell at Barcelona B in 2001, returning to Brazil in the following year after his contract had expired.

He signed a new 3 years contract with São Caetano in January 2007, but he left for Anderlecht on 6-month loan deal on 16 May 2007.

In January 2008, he signed a one-year loan deal with Botafogo. On 8 February 2010 Coritiba signed the left-back on loan from São Caetano until the end of the season.

== Honours ==
Figueirense

- Campeonato Catarinense: 2002, 2003

Coritiba

- Campeonato Brasileiro Série B: 2010
- Campeonato Paranaense: 2010, 2011

Atlético Mineiro

- Campeonato Mineiro: 2012
