= Madson (footballer, born 1986) =

Brazilian footballer

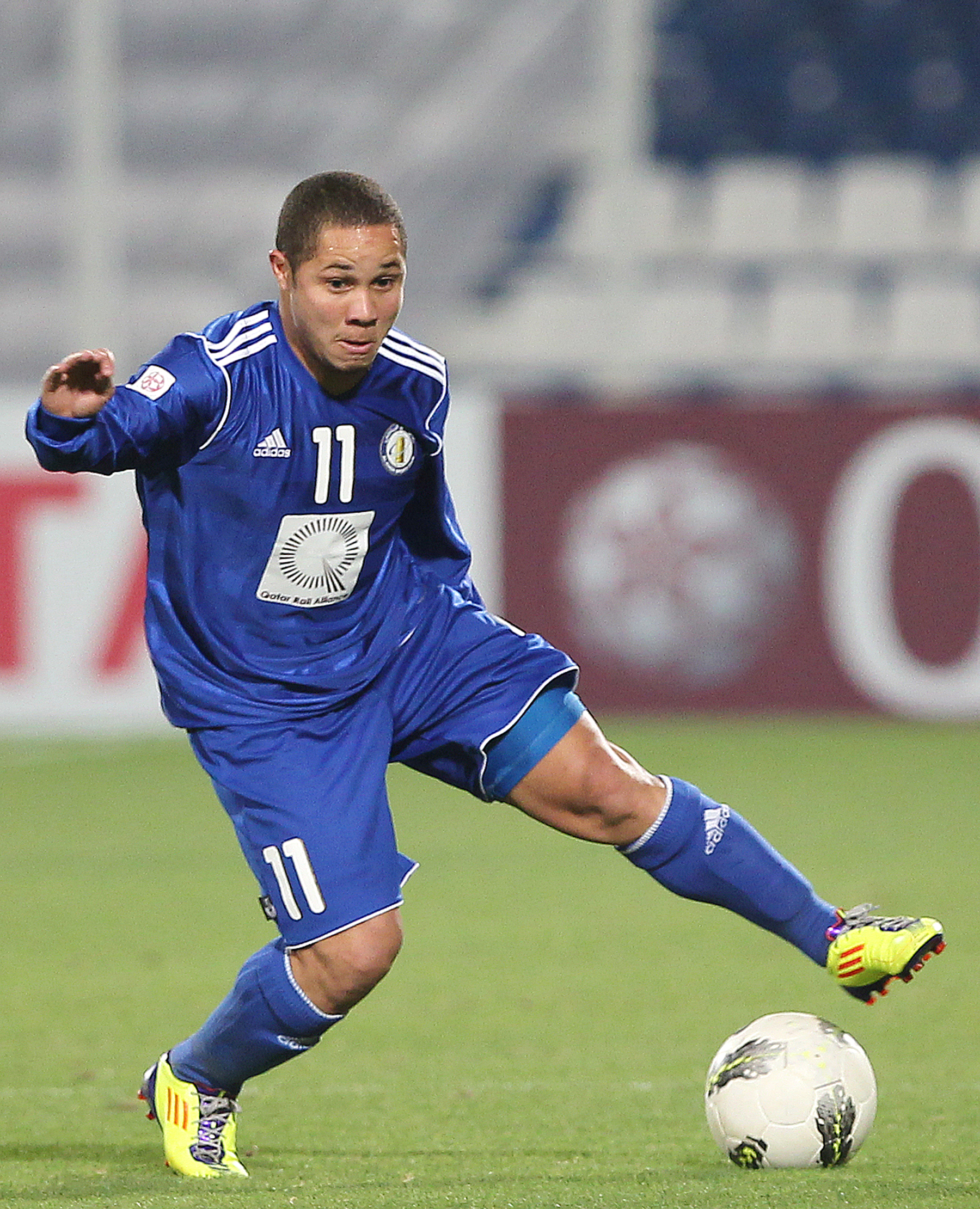
- Madson playing for Al-Khor

Personal information
- Full name: Madson Formagini Caridade
- Date of birth: May 21, 1986 (age 40)
- Place of birth: Volta Redonda, Brazil
- Height: 1.57 m (5 ft 2 in)
- Position: Attacking midfielder

Youth career
- 2004–2005: Volta Redonda
- 2005–2006: Vasco da Gama

Senior career*
Years	Team	Apps	(Gls)
2006–2008	Vasco da Gama	52	(7)
2007–2008	→ Duque de Caxias (loan)	0	(0)
2008	→ América (RN) (loan)	3	(2)
2009–2011	Santos	55	(9)
2011	→ Atlético Paranaense (loan)	22	(2)
2012–2018	Al-Khor	141	(43)
2019	Fortaleza	1	(0)
2019	→ CSA (loan)	6	(0)
2020	São Caetano	4	(0)
- * Club domestic league appearances and goals as of 18:44, 13 May 2021 (UTC)

Madson Formagini Caridade, or simply Madson (born May 21, 1986, in Volta Redonda), is a Brazilian footballer who plays as an attacking midfielder. He is known for his small stature and his set pieces.

== Career ==
Natural Volta Redonda, Rio de Janeiro, Madson began his career in football still in the youth ranks of local club. In 2005, the team drew the attention of Estádio São Januário, having been hired that year to join the junior division Cruzmaltina, under the command of experienced coach Toninho Barroso. In Estádio São Januário, he played, lived and studied.

At the time, Madson was an extremely skilled and fast attacking midfielder, just promoted to professionals in 2006 by then-coach Renato Gaúcho. Despite having become a fan favorite of Vasco da Gama, he failed to deliver consistent performances. He ended up losing even more space on the team with the departure of Renato Gaúcho and the arrival of Celso Roth as manager of Vasco da Gama in 2007.

In January 2009, his contract with Vasco expired and he signed a contract with Santos.

After a good year in the club, Madson was involved in a scandal alongside Zé Eduardo and Felipe, and after this he was loaned to Atlético Paranaense.

However, later in the year, his contract with Atlético was terminated, and he returned to Santos because he "violated the rules of Football Training Department and internal rules of the club".

After his loan in Atlético, Madson returned to Santos. However, he was not in the club's plans, and was loaned to Qatari club Al-Khor, in a five-month deal.

On 26 December 2018, Madson returned to Brazil and joined Fortaleza, newly promoted to the Série A.
