= Jean (footballer, born 1982) =

Brazilian footballer

Personal information
- Full name: Jean Carlos da Silva Ferreira
- Date of birth: 3 March 1982 (age 44)
- Place of birth: São Gonçalo, Brazil
- Height: 1.75 m (5 ft 9 in)
- Position: Striker

Youth career
- 1997–2002: Flamengo

Senior career*
Years	Team	Apps	(Gls)
2002–2004	Flamengo	77	(12)
2005	Cruzeiro	0	(0)
2005	→ Flamengo (loan)	17	(4)
2005–2008	Saturn Moscow Oblast	15	(2)
2006	→ Vasco da Gama (loan)	21	(3)
2007	→ Corinthians (loan)	0	(0)
2007	→ Fluminense (loan)	11	(0)
2008	→ Vasco da Gama (loan)	17	(5)
2008–2009	Al-Sharjah		
2009	Santos	5	(1)
2010	Brasiliense	18	(3)
2011	Volta Redonda	11	(1)
2011–2012	America-RJ		
2012–2013	Madureira	16	(4)
2014	Macaé	16	(0)
2016	America-RJ	10	(0)
2018	Rio Verde	6	(0)
2018	Uberlândia	2	(0)
2022	EC Lemense	17	(0)
- * Club domestic league appearances and goals

Jean Carlos da Silva Ferreira (born 3 March 1982), or simply Jean or Jean Carlos, is a Brazilian former football striker.

== Honours ==
Flamengo

- Taça Guanabara: 2004
- Campeonato Carioca: 2004

América

- Campeonato Carioca Série B: 2015
