= Felipe Garcia (footballer, born 1988) =

Brazilian footballer

Personal information
- Full name: Felipe Garcia dos Prazeres
- Date of birth: 10 January 1988 (age 38)
- Place of birth: São Vicente, Brazil
- Height: 1.93 m (6 ft 4 in)
- Position: Goalkeeper

Team information
- Current team: ABC

Youth career
- Santos

Senior career*
Years	Team	Apps	(Gls)
2006–2012	Santos	66	(0)
2009	→ Paraná (loan)	9	(0)
2009	→ Portuguesa Santista (loan)	12	(0)
2011	→ Avaí (loan)	27	(0)
2012	→ Náutico (loan)	22	(0)
2013	Náutico	23	(0)
2013–2014	Fluminense	3	(0)
2015	Portuguesa	6	(0)
2016–2017	Anápolis	19	(0)
2016–2017	→ Atlético Goianiense (loan)	20	(0)
2017–2018	Moreirense	0	(0)
2018	CSA	8	(0)
2019–2024	Tombense	217	(0)
2019	→ Sport Recife (loan)	0	(0)
2025–	ABC	21	(0)

International career
2005	Brazil U17	6	(0)
- * Club domestic league appearances and goals as of 15:22, 10 July 2025 (UTC)

Felipe Garcia dos Prazeres (born 10 January 1988), simply known as Felipe Garcia, is a Brazilian footballer who plays as a goalkeeper for ABC.

== Club career ==
Born in São Vicente, São Paulo, Felipe graduated from Santos's prolific youth setup, and was promoted to the main squad in 2006, initially as a third-choice. On 6 September 2006 he made his first team debut, starting in a 1–0 home win against Cruzeiro, for that year's Copa Sudamericana.

Felipe made his Série A debut four days later, playing the full 90 minutes in a 1–1 away draw against Fortaleza. On 5 October, in a derby against Corinthians, he replaced Fábio Costa in the sixth minute of the match, after the latter suffered an injury, and was a key unit in his side's 3–0 away win.

Felipe was included in Brazil's preliminary squad for the Beijing Summer Olympics, but was eventually not included in the final list for that competition by coach Dunga.

Still as a second-choice in the following campaigns, Felipe was loaned to Paraná and subsequently Portuguesa Santista before returning to Peixe in May 2009, after another injury from Fábio Costa. He was made a starter for the rest of the season, appearing in 25 league matches.

Felipe started 2010 as a first-choice, but subsequently lost his spot to another youth graduate, Rafael. After an altercation with supporters through a social media, he was left out of the squad, and loaned to Avaí and Náutico, respectively.

On 3 January 2013 Felipe joined Timbu permanently, signing a two-year deal. On 1 October he left the club, and moved to Fluminense.

After being mainly a backup to Diego Cavalieri, Felipe was released in December 2014. On 6 May, of the following year he signed for Portuguesa, in Série C.

After spending six months without a club, Felipe joined Anápolis in 2016, and moved to Atlético Goianiense in June of that year. Despite becoming a first-choice at the latter, he moved abroad to join Primeira Liga side Moreirense on 25 August 2017.

After just to Taça da Liga matches, Felipe returned to his home country with CSA on 26 June 2018. On 4 January of the following year, he agreed to a deal with Tombense.

On 2 October 2019, Felipe was loaned to Sport Recife until the end of the year. He returned to Tombense for the 2020 season, after not playing any matches for Sport, and subsequently established himself as an undisputed starter for the side.

On 13 December 2024, Felipe signed a one-year deal with ABC.

== Career statistics ==
As of 10 July 2025

Club	Season	League			State League		Cup		Continental		Other		Total	
Club	Season	Division	Apps	Goals	Apps	Goals	Apps	Goals	Apps	Goals	Apps	Goals	Apps	Goals
Santos	2006	Série A	6	0	—		0	0	3 (Note: Appearance(s) in Copa Sudamericana)	0	—		9	0
Santos	2007	Série A	2	0	0	0	—		0	0	—		2	0
Santos	2008	Série A	3	0	1	0	—		0	0	—		4	0
Santos	2009	Série A	25	0	0	0	0	0	—		—		25	0
Santos	2010	Série A	6	0	23	0	9	0	1	0	—		39	0
Santos	Subtotal		42	0	24	0	9	0	4	0	—		79	0
Paraná (loan)	2009	Série B	0	0	9	0	0	0	—		—		9	0
Portuguesa Santista (loan)	2009	Paulista A2	—		12	0	—		—		—		12	0
Avaí (loan)	2011	Série A	27	0	—		0	0	—		—		27	0
Náutico (loan)	2012	Série A	21	0	1	0	0	0	—		—		22	0
Náutico	2013	Série A	3	0	20	0	2	0	0	0	—		25	0
Náutico	Subtotal		24	0	21	0	2	0	0	0	—		47	0
Fluminense	2013	Série A	0	0	—		0	0	—		—		0	0
Fluminense	2014	Série A	3	0	0	0	0	0	2	0	—		5	0
Fluminense	Subtotal		3	0	0	0	0	0	2	0	—		5	0
Portuguesa	2015	Série C	6	0	—		—		—		—		6	0
Anápolis	2016	Série D	1	0	18	0	—		—		—		19	0
Atlético Goianiense	2016	Série B	1	0	—		—		—		—		1	0
Atlético Goianiense	2017	Série A	18	0	1	0	1	0	—		—		20	0
Atlético Goianiense	Subtotal		19	0	1	0	1	0	0	0	—		21	0
Moreirense	2017–18	Primeira Liga	0	0	—		0	0	—		2 (Note: Appearance(s) in Taça da Liga)	0	2	0
CSA	2018	Série B	8	0	0	0	0	0	—		0	0	8	0
Tombense	2019	Série C	18	0	12	0	2	0	—		—		32	0
Tombense	2020	Série C	17	0	15	0	—		—		—		32	0
Tombense	2021	Série C	25	0	13	0	2	0	—		1 (Note: Appearance(s) in Recopa Mineira)	0	41	0
Tombense	2022	Série B	36	0	2	0	2	0	—		—		40	0
Tombense	2023	Série B	37	0	12	0	4	0	—		—		53	0
Tombense	2024	Série C	18	0	10	0	1	0	—		—		29	0
Tombense	Subtotal		151	0	66	0	11	0	—		1	0	227	0
Sport Recife (loan)	2019	Série B	0	0	—		—		—		—		0	0
ABC	2025	Série C	10	0	11	0	1	0	—		1 (Note: Appearance(s) in Copa do Nordeste)	0	23	0
Career total			291	0	160	0	24	0	6	0	3	0	485	0

== Honours ==
=== Club ===
Santos

- Campeonato Paulista Sub-17: 2004
- Campeonato Paulista: 2006, 2007, 2010
- Copa do Brasil: 2010

Atlético Goianiense

- Campeonato Brasileiro Série B: 2016

=== International ===
Brazil U17

- South American Under-17 Football Championship: 2005
