= Bruno Costa (footballer, born 1990) =

Brazilian footballer

Personal information
- Full name: Bruno Costa de Souza
- Date of birth: 6 February 1990 (age 36)
- Place of birth: Valente, Brazil
- Height: 1.80 m (5 ft 11 in)
- Position: Left back

Team information
- Current team: EC São Bernardo

Youth career
- 2004–2009: Atlético Paranaense

Senior career*
| Years | Team | Apps | (Gls) |
| 2009–2015 | Atlético Paranaense | 25 | (0) |
| 2013–2014 | → Joinville (loan) | 19 | (0) |
| 2015 | → Botafogo-SP (loan) | 0 | (0) |
| 2015 | Bragantino | 13 | (0) |
| 2016 | Mogi Mirim | 0 | (0) |
| 2016 | Tupi | 31 | (1) |
| 2017 | Linense | 11 | (0) |
| 2017 | Botafogo-PB | 1 | (0) |
| 2018 | Volta Redonda | 11 | (2) |
| 2018 | → Pelotas (loan) | 0 | (0) |
| 2019 | Portuguesa | 0 | (0) |
| 2019–2021 | Água Santa | 0 | (0) |

International career
| 2005 | Brazil U15 | | |
- * Club domestic league appearances and goals as of 4 November 2018

Bruno Costa de Souza (born 6 February 1990), known as Bruno Costa, is a Brazilian footballer who plays as a left back for EC São Bernardo.

== Career ==
Bruno Costa began his development in the youth system of the Brazilian club Atletico-Paranaense in 2004, and since 2009, he has defended the colours of the senior side, being loaned out to Joinville in 2013. He became supercampeão with the Atletico-Paranaense youth team, winning both the juvenile category, and U-15 juniors league titles.
