= Bida (footballer) =

Brazilian footballer (born 1984)

Personal information
- Full name: Valmir Roseno Santos
- Date of birth: 2 August 1984 (age 42)
- Place of birth: Itajuípe, Brazil
- Height: 1.81 m (5 ft 11 1/2 in)
- Position: Midfielder

Team information
- Current team: Mixto

Senior career*
Years	Team	Apps	(Gls)
2005	Ipitanga		
2005–2011	Vitória		
2008	→ Santos (loan)		
2011–2013	Atlético Goianiense		
2014	Ponte Preta		
2014	Vila Nova		
2015	Serrano		
2016	ABC		
2017–	Mixto		
- * Club domestic league appearances and goals as of 24 March 2017

Valmir Roseno Santos (born 2 August 1984), known as Bida, is a Brazilian footballer who plays as midfielder for Mixto.

== Career statistics ==
As of 24 March 2017

Club	Season	League			State League		Cup		Continental		Other		Total	
Club	Season	Division	Apps	Goals	Apps	Goals	Apps	Goals	Apps	Goals	Apps	Goals	Apps	Goals
Santos	2008	Série A	16	2	—		—		—		—		16	2
Vitória	2009	Série A	13	0	19	2	3	0	2	0	—		37	2
Vitória	2010	Série A	26	0	19	1	11	2	1	0	—		57	3
Vitória	2011	Série B	—		9	0	—		—		—		9	0
Vitória	Subtotal		39	0	47	3	14	2	3	0	—		103	5
Atlético Goianiense	2011	Série A	33	3	4	0	—		—		—		37	3
Atlético Goianiense	2012	Série A	11	1	19	9	3	0	—		—		33	10
Atlético Goianiense	2013	Série B	17	1	—		—		—		—		17	1
Atlético Goianiense	Subtotal		61	5	23	9	3	0	—		—		87	14
Ponte Preta	2014	Série B	—		10	0	1	0	—		—		11	0
Vila Nova	2014	Série B	2	0	—		—		—		—		2	0
Serrano	2015	Baiano	—		1	0	—		—		1 (Note: All appearance(s) in Copa do Nordeste)	0	2	0
ABC	2016	Série C	—		3	0	—		—		2	0	5	0
Mixto	2017	Mato-Grossense	—		7	0	—		—		—		7	0
Career total			118	7	91	12	18	2	3	0	3	0	233	21
