= Roberto Brum (footballer, born 1978) =

Brazilian footballer

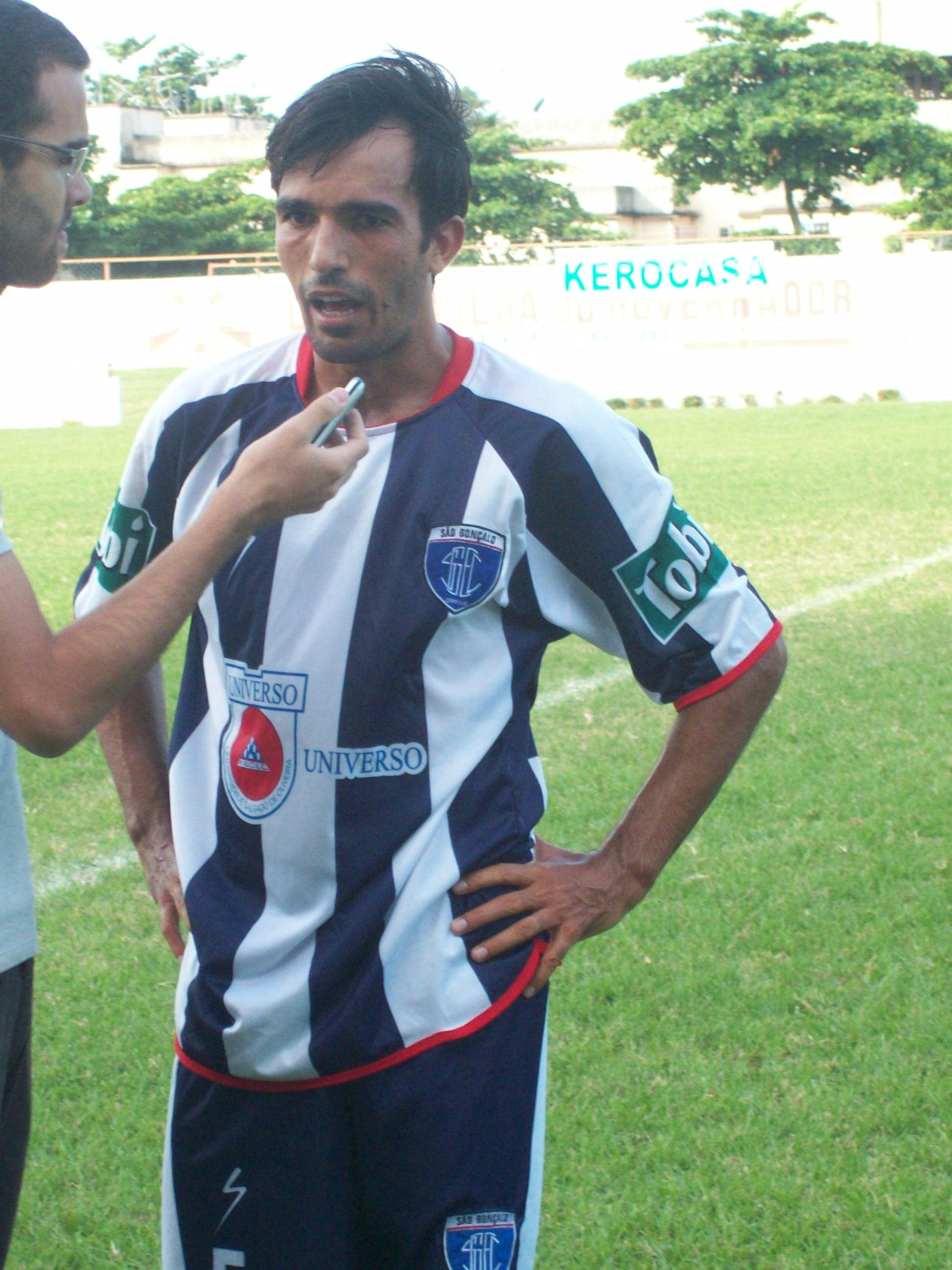

Personal information
- Full name: Roberto Brum Vallado
- Date of birth: 7 July 1978 (age 48)
- Place of birth: São Gonçalo, Brazil
- Height: 1.73 m (5 ft 8 in)
- Position: Midfielder

Senior career*
Years	Team	Apps	(Gls)
1998–2001	Fluminense	19	(0)
2002–2004	Coritiba	76	(2)
2004–2007	Académica	74	(0)
2007–2008	Braga	20	(0)
2008–2010	Santos	48	(0)
2009	→ Figueirense (loan)	13	(0)
2011–2012	Alki Larnaca	12	(1)
2012–2015	São Gonçalo		
Total		262	(3)

Managerial career
- 2012: São Gonçalo (interim)
- 2013: Profute
- * Club domestic league appearances and goals

Roberto Brum Vallado (born 7 July 1978), known as Brum, is a Brazilian retired footballer who played as a defensive midfielder.

== Football career ==
Born in São Gonçalo, Rio de Janeiro, Brum started his professional career in Brazil with Fluminense FC and Coritiba Foot Ball Club. He helped the latter team win the 2003 and 2004 Paraná State championships.

Moving to Portugal, Brum joined Académica de Coimbra for 2004–05. He was an undisputed starter in his two final Primeira Liga seasons, earning him a transfer to perennial UEFA Cup qualification candidates S.C. Braga in the 2007–08 campaign.

After helping the Minho side again reach the UEFA Cup, Brum returned to Brazil, signing with Santos FC. On 16 September 2009, he joined Figueirense Futebol Clube on loan.

In January 2011, aged nearly 33, Brum moved abroad again, signing with Alki Larnaca FC in Cyprus. He retired the following year after a brief spell with amateurs São Gonçalo Esporte Clube in his hometown, and started his managerial career precisely with that club.

== Personal life ==
Brum was known for his humorous and unusual replies during interviews, where he also resorted to religious connotations. After retiring, he worked as a minister.
