= Tiago Luís =

Brazilian footballer

Personal information
- Full name: Tiago Luís Martins
- Date of birth: 13 March 1989 (age 37)
- Place of birth: Ribeirão Preto, Brazil
- Height: 1.76 m (5 ft 9 in)
- Position: Forward

Team information
- Current team: FC Cascavel

Youth career
- 2002–2004: Santos
- 2004–2005: Atlético Paranaense
- 2006: Comercial-SP
- 2006–2007: Santos

Senior career*
Years	Team	Apps	(Gls)
2008–2012	Santos	29	(2)
2009–2010	→ União Leiria (loan)	29	(1)
2011	→ Ponte Preta (loan)	31	(2)
2012	→ XV de Piracicaba (loan)	6	(1)
2012	→ Bragantino (loan)	11	(0)
2013	Mirassol	14	(2)
2013–2014	Chapecoense	77	(9)
2015	→ Joinville (loan)	19	(3)
2016	América Mineiro	21	(1)
2016	Paysandu	23	(6)
2017–2018	Goiás	63	(11)
2019	São Bento	7	(0)
2019	Paysandu	11	(0)
2020	Rayong		
2020	Confiança	11	(0)
2021–	São Bernardo	0	(0)
- * Club domestic league appearances and goals as of 01:06, 4 March 2021 (UTC)

Tiago Luís Martins (born 13 March 1989), known as Tiago Luís, is a Brazilian footballer who plays as a forward for São Bernardo

== Football career ==
Born in Ribeirão Preto, São Paulo, Tiago Luís emerged through local Santos FC's youth ranks, and won the State League with the club in his last year as a junior. He made his senior debut on 27 January 2008 in the same competition, against Clube Atlético Bragantino, scoring in that match.

Also during that timeframe, media addressed an eventual interest in Luís from La Liga giants Real Madrid, but nothing came of it. In August 2009, after only three more Série A games for Santos, the player was loaned to U.D. Leiria in Portugal. During his only season with the top division side, he only started in five of the league games he appeared in, scoring only once in official matches (in a 1–1 home draw against C.D. Trofense in the League Cup).

On 6 January 2011, Tiago Luís joined Série B side Associação Atlética Ponte Preta, on loan until the end of the season. After serving another temporary deals at Esporte Clube XV de Novembro (Piracicaba) and Clube Atlético Bragantino, he was released by Peixe on 9 January 2013.

Tiago Luís moved to Mirassol Futebol Clube on 29 January 2013. After appearing regularly he moved to Associação Chapecoense de Futebol on 15 May, contributing with 21 appearances and two goals as his side were promoted to the first division after a 35-year absence.
