= Mariano Trípodi =

Argentine footballer

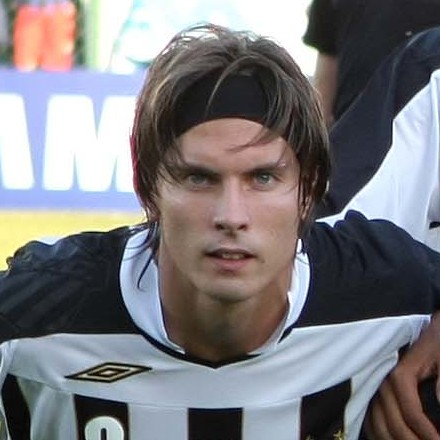
- 2008

Personal information
- Full name: Mariano Sebastián Trípodi
- Date of birth: 3 July 1987 (age 39)
- Place of birth: Buenos Aires, Argentina
- Height: 1.81 m (5 ft 11 in)
- Position: Striker

Team information
- Current team: Metropolitano

Youth career
- Boca Juniors

Senior career*
Years	Team	Apps	(Gls)
2005–2006	Boca Juniors	1	(0)
2006–2007	1. FC Köln	1	(1)
2006–2007	1. FC Köln II	18	(6)
2007	San Martín-SJ	4	(0)
2008–2009	Santos	7	(1)
2008	→ Vitória (loan)	4	(0)
2009	→ Atlético Mineiro (loan)	0	(0)
2010	Metropolitano	28	(5)
2010	Arsenal Sarandí	0	(0)
2011	Tochigi SC	4	(0)
2011–2013	Vaduz	50	(11)
2013	Caxias	16	(2)
2014	Rio Branco	0	(0)
2015	Metropolitano	17	(5)
2015–2016	Joinville	6	(1)
2016	Santo André	9	(0)
2016–2017	Ferro Carril Oeste	0	(0)
2017	Metropolitano	10	(4)
2017	Deportivo Español	4	(0)
2018	Unión San Felipe	7	(0)
2018	Talleres RE	7	(0)
2019–	Metropolitano	9	(1)
- * Club domestic league appearances and goals as of 14 April 2019

Mariano Sebastián Trípodi (born 3 July 1987) is an Argentine footballer who plays for Metropolitano as a striker.

== Club career ==
Born in Buenos Aires, Trípodi started his career playing for the famous Boca Juniors academy which has a habit of producing star players. Clubs from across the continent started to become aware of Tripodi's goalscoring for the Boca Juniors U18s team, scoring 31 times in his first season. He was then quickly taken on by Köln, of Germany, where he played one match, against Duisburg, in which he scored his only goal for the club, and then was demoted to Köln II. He then returned to Argentina, where he joined San Martín de San Juan, playing four matches for the club.

On February 7, 2008, he was signed by Santos of Brazil, and on February 21, 2008, Trípodi played his first match as a Santos player when his club beat Guarani 3–1. On August 22, 2008, he was loaned by Santos to Vitória upon the recommendation of Antonio Tripodi, and on August 30, 2008, he played his first match as a Vitória player, when his club and Ipatinga drew 0-0. Trípodi joined Atlético Mineiro on March 5, 2009. Tripodi is regularly scouted and it was no surprise that it was announced that he had agreed to a ten-day trial at Leeds United on August 5, 2009, arriving in England on August 6, 2009. He played and scored the opening goal on August 12, 2009, in a behind closed doors match against a Newcastle United XI, which Leeds won 5–1. After a half year with Clube Atlético Metropolitano in Brazil, he returned in June 2010 to Argentina and signed a one-year contract for Arsenal de Sarandí.
