= Kléber Pereira =

Brazilian footballer

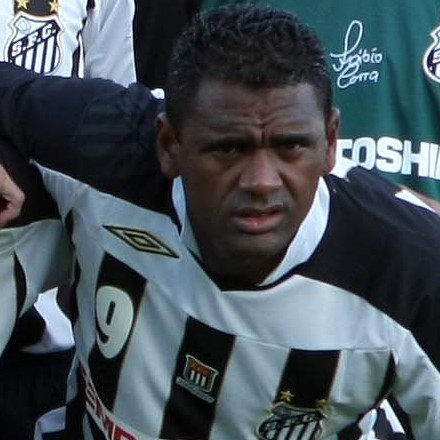
- Kléber Pereira with Santos in 2008

Personal information
- Full name: Kléber João Boas Pereira
- Date of birth: 13 August 1975 (age 51)
- Place of birth: Peri Mirim, Brazil
- Height: 1.80 m (5 ft 11 in)
- Position: Striker

Youth career
- 1995: Cruzeiro-MA

Senior career*
Years	Team	Apps	(Gls)
1995–1998	Moto Club	?	(6)
1996	→ Náutico (loan)	?	(0)
1997–1998	→ Sion (loan)	0	(0)
1999–2002	Atlético Paranaense	185	(124)
2002–2004	Tigres	124	(19)
2004	Veracruz	14	(2)
2005–2006	América	52	(34)
2006–2007	→ Necaxa (Loan)	29	(11)
2007–2010	Santos	93	(76)
2010	Internacional	7	(0)
2010–2011	Vitória	12	(1)
2011–2013	Moto Club	0	(0)
Total		350	(193)
- * Club domestic league appearances and goals

Kléber João Boas Pereira (or simply Kléber Pereira in Brazil; born 13 August 1975 in Peri Mirim-MA, Brazil) is a retired Brazilian footballer who last played for Moto Club. A tall and gangly player with a good heading ability, Kléber played as a striker.

== Career ==
=== Brazil ===
Described as a late bloomer by scouts, Kléber began his career in the Brazilian professional league Second Division, playing for Moto Club in 1996. Except for a six-month stint at Náutico, Kléber remained at Moto Club until 1999. In the middle of the 1999 season, Kléber was transferred to Atlético Paranaense, where he enjoyed success, winning the goalscoring title in 2001. After his breakout season, he was courted by other teams in Brazil, as well as scouts from foreign clubs.

=== Mexico ===
Prior to the Clausura 2003 season, Kléber was announced as the star signing by the UANL Tigres in Monterrey, Mexico. In his first season, he scored ten goals and helped the team reach the semifinals in the playoffs. The following season, scored eight goals while helping the team to a berth in the Apertura 2003 finals, where they lost to Pachuca.

After his immediate success at Tigres, Kléber' performance dropped off and he was mostly relegated to the bench for the Clausura 2004 season, scoring only one goal. Following the Clausura 2004 season, he was transferred to Veracruz, where he enjoyed limited success, scoring twice. Thanks to a recommendation by his ex-teammate Cuauhtémoc Blanco, Kléber was signed by Club América following his lone season at Veracruz. There, he regained his goalscoring prowess, scoring 14 goals in his first season at the club, helping them to a championship in the Clausura 2005 season. Kléber did not actually play in the final, after being suspended for three games due to kicking Federico Lussenhoff of Cruz Azul in the groin in one of the semifinal matches. The following season, Kléber won his second goalscoring title, sharing it with three other players (Vicente Matías Vuoso, Walter Gaitán and Sebastián Abreu).

Prior to the Apertura 2006 season, he was loaned out to sister club Necaxa (at the time Club América, Necaxa and Club San Luis had the same owners, and multiple ownership was allowed by Liga MX).

Kléber is a member of the "Blanco Four", a group of players who once played at Veracruz with Blanco and were signed by América after being recommended by the striker. The other members are Christian Giménez, Carlos Infante and Armando Navarrete.

On 5 July 2007 Kleber returned to Brazil with Santos and signed a deal until June 30, 2008. Kléber finished as the Campeonato Brasileiro Série A 2008 top scorer, with 21 goals, tied with Washington and Keirrison.

== Honours ==
=== Club ===
Atlético-PR

- Brazilian Série A: 2001
- Paraná State League: 2000, 2001, 2002

Club América

- Mexican Championship: Clausura 2005
- Mexican Championship Campeón De Campeones (Mexican Super Cup): 2004–05
- CONCACAF Champions League: 2006

=== Individual ===
- Mexican Primera División Top scorer (Shared): Apertura 2005
- Campeonato Brasileiro Série A Team of the Year: 2008
- Campeonato Brasileiro Série A top goalscorer: 2008
