= 2011 in Ecuadorian football =

Football in Ecuador
- Season: 2011

The 2011 season is the 89th season of competitive football in Ecuador.

== National leagues ==
=== Serie A ===
- Champion: Deportivo Quito (5th title)
  - Runner-up: Emelec
- International cup qualifiers:
  - 2011 Copa Sudamericana: Emelec, Deportivo Quito
  - 2012 Copa Libertadores: Emelec, Deportivo Quito, El Nacional
  - 2012 Copa Sudamericana: Deportivo Quito
- Relegated: Imbabura, ESPOLI

=== Serie B ===
- Winner: Técnico Universitario (5th title)
  - Runner-up: Macará
- Promoted: Técnico Universitario, Macará
- Relegated: LDU Portoviejo, Atlético Audaz

=== Segunda Categoria ===
- Winner: Ferroviarios (1st title)
  - Runner-up: Mushuc Runa
- Promoted: Ferroviarios, Mushuc Runa

== Clubs in international competitions ==
Team	2011 Copa Libertadores	2011 Copa Sudamericana
Deportivo Quito	Eliminated in the First Stage	Eliminated in the First Stage
Emelec	Eliminated in the Second Stage	Eliminated in the Second State
LDU Quito	Eliminated to the Round of 16	In the Semifinals

=== Deportivo Quito ===
==== Copa Libertadores ====
First Stage: Match G5 standings
Team	Pld	W	D	L	GF	GA	GD	Pts
(Argentina) Independiente	2	1	0	1	2	1	+1	3
(Ecuador) Deportivo Quito	2	1	0	1	1	2	−1	3

January 25 First Stage	Independiente (Argentina)	2–0	(Ecuador) Deportivo Quito	Avellaneda, Argentina
21:15 UTC−03:00	Defederico 49'; Rodríguez 70'	Report		Stadium: Estadio Libertadores de América; Referee: Heber Lopes (Brazil)

February 1 First Stage	Deportivo Quito (Ecuador)	1–0	(Argentina) Independiente	Quito, Ecuador
19:45 UTC−05:00	Quiñónez 56'	Report		Stadium: Estadio Olímpico Atahualpa; Referee: Jorge Larrionda (Uruguay)

==== Copa Sudamericana ====
First Stage: Match D standings
Team	Pld	W	D	L	GF	GA	GD	Pts
(Venezuela) Deportivo Anzoátegui	2	1	0	1	1	1	+1	3
(Ecuador) Deportivo Quito	2	1	0	1	1	1	−1	3

August 3 First Stage	Deportivo Quito (Ecuador)	1–0	(Venezuela) Deportivo Anzoátegui	Quito, Ecuador
17:00 UTC−05:00	Bevacqua 61'	Report		Stadium: Estadio Olímpico Atahualpa; Referee: Imer Machado (Colombia)

August 16 First Stage	Deportivo Anzoátegui (Venezuela)	2–0	(Ecuador) Deportivo Quito	Puerto La Cruz, Venezuela
21:15 UTC−04:30	E. Hernández 1'; Checa 90+1' (o.g.)	Report		Stadium: Estadio José Antonio Anzoátegui; Referee: Enrique Osses (Chile)

=== Emelec ===
==== Copa Libertadores ====
Second Stage: Group 6 standings
Team	Pld	W	D	L	GF	GA	GD	Pts
(Brazil) Internacional	6	4	1	1	12	3	+11	13
(Mexico) Jaguares	6	3	0	3	5	6	−2	9
(Ecuador) Emelec	6	2	2	2	4	3	−1	8
(Bolivia) Jorge Wilstermann	6	1	1	4	1	10	−8	4

February 16 Second Stage	Emelec (Ecuador)	1–1	(Brazil) Internacional	Guayaquil, Ecuador
19:00 UTC−05:00	Giménez 90+5'	Report	Bolatti 79'	Stadium: Estadio George Capwell; Referee: Néstor Pitana (Argentina)

February 22 Second Stage	Emelec (Ecuador)	1–0	(Bolivia) Jorge Wilstermann	Guayaquil, Ecuador
19:30 UTC−05:00	Morante 33'	Report		Stadium: Estadio George Capwell; Referee: Jorge Osorio (Chile)

March 8 Second Stage	Jaguares (Mexico)	2–1	(Ecuador) Emelec	Tuxtla Gutiérrez, Mexico
20:45 UTC−06:00	Torres 43' (pen.); Salazar 66'	Report	Menéndez 69'	Stadium: Estadio Víctor Manuel Reyna; Referee: Marlon Escalante (Venezuela)

March 16 Second Stage	Emelec (Ecuador)	1–0	(Mexico) Jaguares	Guayaquil, Ecuador
19:50 UTC−05:00	Quiroz 53' (pen.)	Report		Stadium: Estadio George Capwell; Referee: Víctor Hugo Carrillo (Peru)

April 7 Second Stage	Jorge Wilstermann (Bolivia)	0–0	(Ecuador) Emelec	Cochabamba, Bolivia
19:00 UTC−04:00		Report		Stadium: Estadio Félix Capriles; Referee: Marlon Escalante (Venezuela)

April 19 Second Stage	Internacional (Brazil)	2–0	(Ecuador) Emelec	Porto Alegre, Brazil
20:15 UTC−03:00	Sóbis 51'; Leandro Damião 84'	Report		Stadium: Estádio José Pinheiro Borda (Beira-Rio); Referee: Óscar Ruiz (Colombia)

==== Copa Sudamericana ====
Second Stage: Match O10 standings
Team	Pld	W	D	L	GF	GA	GD	Pts
(Paraguay) Olimpia	2	2	0	0	4	2	+2	6
(Ecuador) Emelec	2	0	0	2	2	4	−2	0

September 15 Second Stage	Olimpia (Paraguay)	2–1	(Ecuador) Emelec	Asunción, Paraguay
19:15 UTC−04:00	Marín 14', 71'	Report	Vigneri 39'	Stadium: Estadio Defensores del Chaco; Referee: Roberto Silvera (Uruguay)

September 20 Second Stage	Emelec (Ecuador)	1–2	(Paraguay) Olimpia	Guayaquil, Ecuador
19:45 UTC−05:00	Franco 68'	Report	Ortiz 6'; Zeballos 25'	Stadium: Estadio George Capwell; Referee: José Buitrago (Colombia)
Note: The match was abandoned after 81 minutes by the referee due to objects thrown onto the field.

=== LDU Quito ===
==== Copa Libertadores ====
Second Stage: Group 8 standings
Team	Pld	W	D	L	GF	GA	GD	Pts
(Ecuador) LDU Quito	6	3	1	2	12	4	+8	10
(Uruguay) Peñarol	6	3	0	3	6	11	−5	9
(Argentina) Independiente	6	2	2	2	7	8	−1	8
(Argentina) Godoy Cruz	6	2	1	3	8	10	−2	7

February 17 Second Stage	Godoy Cruz (Argentina)	2–1	(Ecuador) LDU Quito	Mendoza, Argentina
22:15 UTC−03:00	C. Sánchez 16'; N. Sánchez 59'	Report	Reasco 53'	Stadium: Estadio Malvinas Argentinas; Referee: Martín Vázquez (Uruguay)

March 3 Second Stage	LDU Quito (Ecuador)	3–0	(Argentina) Independiente	Quito, Ecuador
20:30 UTC−05:00	Ambrosi 10'; M. Bolaños 52'; Urrutia 78'	Report		Stadium: Estadio Casa Blanca; Referee: Óscar Ruiz (Colombia)

March 9 Second Stage	Peñarol (Uruguay)	1–0	(Ecuador) LDU Quito	Montevideo, Uruguay
20:30 UTC−02:00	Aguiar 57'	Report		Stadium: Estadio Centenario; Referee: Víctor Rivera (Peru)

March 17 Second Stage	LDU Quito (Ecuador)	5–0	(Uruguay) Peñarol	Quito, Ecuador
19:30 UTC−05:00	Luna 22'; W. Calderon 45+1', 78'; Valdez 58' (o.g.); Barcos 63' (pen.)	Report		Stadium: Estadio Casa Blanca; Referee: Wilmer Roldán (Colombia)
Note: During the match, Carlos Luna scored the 12,000th goal in the history of the Copa Libertadores.

April 5 Second Stage	Independiente (Argentina)	1–1	(Ecuador) LDU Quito	Avellaneda, Argentina
21:15 UTC−03:00	Núñez 23' (pen.)	Report	Barcos 57'	Stadium: Estadio Libertadores de América; Referee: Carlos Torres (Paraguay)

April 12 Second Stage	LDU Quito (Ecuador)	2–0	(Argentina) Godoy Cruz	Quito, Ecuador
18:15 UTC−05:00	L. Bolaños 47'; Barcos 58'	Report		Stadium: Estadio Casa Blanca; Referee: Paulo Oliveira (Brazil)

Round of 16: Match G standings
Team	Pld	W	D	L	GF	GA	GD	Pts
(Argentina) Vélez Sársfield	2	2	0	0	5	0	+5	6
(Ecuador) LDU Quito	2	0	0	2	0	5	−5	0

April 26 Round of 16	Vélez Sársfield (Argentina)	3–0	(Ecuador) LDU Quito	Buenos Aires, Argentina
21:50 UTC−03:00	Fernández 7', 10'; Domínguez 54'	Report		Stadium: Estadio José Amalfitani; Referee: Carlos Amarilla (Paraguay)

May 5 Round of 16	LDU Quito (Ecuador)	0–2	(Argentina) Vélez Sársfield	Quito, Ecuador
20:45 UTC−05:00		Report	Álvarez 45+10'; Bella 80'	Stadium: Estadio Casa Blanca; Referee: Wilmar Roldán (Colombia)

==== Copa Sudamericana ====
First Stage: Match H standings
Team	Pld	W	D	L	GF	GA	GD	Pts
(Ecuador) LDU Quito	2	1	1	0	1	0	+1	4
(Venezuela) Yaracuyanos	2	0	1	1	0	1	−1	1

August 4 First Stage	Yaracuyanos (Venezuela)	1–1	(Ecuador) LDU Quito	San Felipe, Venezuela
19:45 UTC−04:30	Chalar 78'	Report	Barcos 64' (pen.)	Stadium: Estadio Florentino Oropeza; Referee: Georges Buckley (Peru)

August 17 First Stage	LDU Quito (Ecuador)	1–0	(Venezuela) Yaracuyanos	Quito, Ecuador
17:00 UTC−05:00	Vera 19'	Report		Stadium: Estadio Casa Blanca; Referee: Raúl Orosco (Bolivia)

First Stage: Match O12 standings
Team	Pld	W	D	L	GF	GA	GD	Pts
(Ecuador) LDU Quito	2	2	0	0	5	1	+4	6
(Venezuela) Yaracuyanos	2	0	0	2	1	5	−4	0

September 13 Second Stage	LDU Quito (Ecuador)	4–1	(Venezuela) Trujillanos	Quito, Ecuador
17:00 UTC−05:00	Barcos 25', 43', 90+1' (pen.); González 87'	Report	Falcón 1'	Stadium: Estadio Casa Blanca; Referee: Víctor Hugo Carrillo (Peru)

September 22 Second Stage	Trujillanos (Venezuela)	0–1	(Ecuador) LDU Quito	Valera, Venezuela
19:00 UTC−04:30		Report	L. Bolaños 30'	Stadium: Estadio José Alberto Pérez; Referee: Darío Ubriaco (Uruguay)

Round of 16: Match C5 standings
Team	Pld	W	D	L	GF	GA	GD	Pts
(Ecuador) LDU Quito	2	1	0	1	2	1	+1	3
(Argentina) Independiente	2	1	0	1	1	2	−1	3

September 28 Round of 16	LDU Quito (Ecuador)	2–0	(Argentina) Independiente	Quito, Ecuador
17:15 UTC−05:00	Ambrosi 42'; L. Bolaños 52'	Report		Stadium: Estadio Casa Blanca; Referee: Líber Prudente (Uruguay)

October 12 Round of 16	Independiente (Argentina)	1–0	(Ecuador) LDU Quito	Avellaneda, Argentina
21:15 UTC−03:00	Núñez 45'	Report		Stadium: Estadio Libertadores de América; Referee: José Buitrago (Colombia)

Quarterfinals: Match S4 standings
Team	Pld	W	D	L	GF	GA	GD	Pts
(Ecuador) LDU Quito	2	1	0	1	1	1	0	3
(Paraguay) Libertad	2	1	0	1	1	1	0	3

== National teams ==
=== Senior team ===
==== Copa América ====
Ecuador will participate in their 25th Copa América, to be held in Argentina. They were drawn into Group B.

Group B standings
Team	Pld	W	D	L	GF	GA	GD	Pts
Brazil	3	1	2	0	6	4	+2	5
Venezuela	3	1	2	0	4	3	+1	5
Paraguay	3	0	3	0	5	5	0	3
Ecuador	3	0	1	2	2	5	−3	1

July 3 First Stage	Paraguay	0–0	Ecuador	Santa Fe, Argentina
18:30 UTC−03:00		Report		Stadium: Estadio Brigadier General Estanislao López; Referee: Sergio Pezzotta (Argentina); Assistant referees: Ricardo Casas (Argentina); Luis Abadie (Peru); Fourth official: Víctor Hugo Rivera (Peru); Man of the Match: Marcelo Elizaga (Ecuador)

July 9 First Stage	Venezuela	1–0	Ecuador	Salta, Argentina
18:30 UTC−03:00	C. Gonzalez 61'	Report		Stadium: Estadio Padre Ernesto Martearena; Referee: Wálter Quesada (Costa Rica); Assistant referees: Leonel Leal (Costa Rica); Miguel Nievas (Uruguay); Fourth official: Roberto Silvera (Uruguay); Man of the Match: Cesar Eduardo Gonzalez (Venezuela)

July 13 First Stage	Brazil	4–2	Ecuador	Córdoba, Argentina
21:45 UTC−03:00	Alexandre Pato 28', 61'; Neymar 48', 71'	Report	Caicedo 36', 58'	Stadium: Estadio Mario Alberto Kempes; Referee: Roberto Silvera (Uruguay); Assistant referees: Miguel Nievas (Uruguay); Hernán Maidana (Argentina); Fourth official: Sergio Pezzotta (Argentina)

==== 2014 FIFA World Cup qualification ====
Team	Pld	W	D	L	GF	GA	GD	Pts
Uruguay	3	2	1	0	9	3	+6	7
Argentina	3	1	1	1	5	3	+2	4
Ecuador	2	1	0	1	3	2	+1	3
Colombia	2	1	1	0	3	2	+1	4
Peru	2	1	0	1	4	4	0	3
Chile	3	1	0	2	5	10	−5	3
Venezuela	3	1	1	1	2	3	−1	3
Paraguay	3	1	1	1	3	4	−1	4
Bolivia	3	0	1	2	4	7	−3	1

October 7 Round 1	Ecuador	2–0	Venezuela	Quito, Ecuador
16:05 UTC−05:00	J. Ayoví 15'; Benítez 28'	Report		Stadium: Estadio Olímpico Atahualpa; Attendance: 32,278; Referee: Enrique Osses (Chile)

November 11 Round 3	Paraguay	2–1	Ecuador	Asunción, Paraguay
21:00 UTC−03:00	Riveros 47'; Verón 57'	Report	Rojas 90+2'	Stadium: Estadio Defensores del Chaco; Attendance: 11,173; Referee: Hernando Buitrago (Colombia)

November 15 Round 4	Ecuador	2–0	Peru	Quito, Ecuador
16:00 UTC−05:00	Méndez 69'; Benítez 88'	Report		Stadium: Estadio Olímpico Atahualpa; Attendance: 34,481; Referee: Jorge Larrionda (Uruguay)

==== Friendlies ====
February 9 Copa Municipal de La Ceiba	Honduras	1–1 (4–5 p)	Ecuador	La Ceiba, Honduras
20:30 UTC−06:00	Bengtson 8'	Report	Palacios 12'	Stadium: Estadio Nilmo Edwards
	Penalties
	Núñez (penalty scored); Figueroa (penalty scored); Leverón (penalty scored); Claros (penalty scored); Bengtson (penalty missed); Thomas (penalty missed)		(penalty scored) Guagua; (penalty scored) Noboa; (penalty scored) J. Ayoví; (penalty missed) Quiñónez; (penalty scored) W. Ayoví; (penalty scored) Minda

March 26	Colombia	2–0	Ecuador	Madrid, Spain
18:00 UTC+01:00	Guarín 25'; Falcao 74'	Report		Stadium: Estadio Vicente Calderón; Attendance: 15,000; Referee: Antonio Miguel Mateu (Spain)

March 29	Peru	0–0	Ecuador	The Hague, Netherlands
18:00 UTC+02:00		Report		Stadium: Kyocera Stadion; Referee: Óscar Eric Braanhaar (Netherlands)

April 20	Argentina	2–2	Ecuador	Mar del Plata, Argentina
20:00 UTC−03:00	Yacob 32'; Hauche 35'	ESPN Report	Quiñónez 28'; Castillo 67' (pen.)	Stadium: Estadio José María Minella

May 28	Mexico	1–1	Ecuador	Seattle, Washington, United States
13:15 UTC−07:00	Torres 7'	Report	Arroyo 37'	Stadium: Qwest Field

June 1	Canada	2–2	Ecuador	Toronto, Ontario, Canada
19:00 UTC−04:00	Dunfield 23'; Ricketts 90+'	Report	Benítez 61'; Arroyo 63'	Stadium: BMO Field; Referee: Raymond Bogle (Jamaica)

June 7	Greece	1–1	Ecuador	New York, New York, United States
20:00 UTC−04:00	Tziolis 14'	Report	Erazo 58'	Stadium: Citi Field; Referee: Mark Geiger (United States)

June 25	Ecuador	0–1	Mexico	Quito, Ecuador
16:00 UTC−05:00		Report	Fabián 72'	Stadium: Estadio Olímpico Atahualpa; Referee: Adrian Velez (Colombia)

August 10	Costa Rica	0–2	Ecuador	San José, Costa Rica
21:00 UTC−06:00		Report	Suárez 54'; Méndez 67'	Stadium: Estadio Nacional

September 2	Ecuador	5–2	Jamaica	Quito, Ecuador
16:00 UTC−05:00	J. Ayoví 20'; Suárez 38'; Benítez 45', 50'; Castillo 64'	Report	Cummings 57'; Johnson 67'	Stadium: Estadio Olímpico Atahualpa; Referee: José Buitrago (Colombia)

September 6	Ecuador	4–0	Costa Rica	Quito, Ecuador
16:00 UTC−05:00	Suárez 21'; J. Ayoví 28'; Castillo 59'; Benítez 75'			Stadium: Estadio Olímpico Atahualpa; Referee: Wilmar Roldán (Colombia)

October 11	United States	0–1	Ecuador	Harrison, New Jersey, United States
19:00 UTC−04:00		ESPN Report	J. Ayoví 79'	Stadium: Red Bull Arena; Attendance: 20,707

=== Under-20 team ===
==== South American Youth Championship ====
Group B standings
Team	Pld	W	D	L	GF	GA	GD	Pts
Brazil	4	3	1	0	9	4	+5	10
Ecuador	4	2	1	1	5	3	+2	7
Colombia	4	1	2	1	7	8	−1	5
Paraguay	4	1	1	2	6	8	−2	4
Bolivia	4	0	1	3	3	7	−4	1

January 17 First Stage	Colombia	1–1	Ecuador	Tacna, Peru
19:00 UTC−05:00	Cardona 71' (pen.)	Report	Cazares 29' (pen.)	Stadium: Estadio Jorge Basadre; Referee: Victor Hugo Carrillo (Peru)

January 23 First Stage	Ecuador	1–0	Paraguay	Moquegua, Peru
13:40 UTC−05:00	Montaño 59'	Report		Stadium: Estadio 25 de Noviembre; Referee: Dario Ubriaco (Uruguay)

January 25 First Stage	Ecuador	0–1	Brazil	Tacna, Peru
21:10 UTC−05:00		Report	Henrique 23'	Stadium: Estadio Jorge Basadre; Referee: Diego Abal (Argentina)

January 28 First Stage	Ecuador	3–1	Bolivia	Tacna, Peru
19:00 UTC−05:00	Chalá 57'; Caicedo 61'; Montaño 82'	Report	Rios 42'	Stadium: Estadio Jorge Basadre; Referee: Marlon Escalante (Venezuela)

Final Stage standings
Team	Pld	W	D	L	GF	GA	GD	Pts
Brazil	5	4	0	1	15	3	+12	12
Uruguay	5	3	1	1	4	7	-3	10
Argentina	5	3	0	2	7	5	+2	9
Ecuador	5	2	2	1	3	2	+1	8
Chile	5	1	0	4	6	10	−4	3
Colombia	5	0	1	4	1	8	−7	1

January 31 Final Stage	Argentina	0–1	Ecuador	Arequipa, Peru
19:00 UTC−05:00		Report	Montaño 45'	Stadium: Estadio Monumental Virgen de Chapi; Referee: Wilson Seneme (Brazil)

February 3 Final Stage	Uruguay	1–1	Ecuador	Arequipa, Peru
16:50 UTC−05:00	Mayada 17'	Report	Montaño 58'	Stadium: Estadio Monumental Virgen de Chapi; Referee: Antonio Arias (Paraguay)

February 6 Final Stage	Colombia	0–0	Ecuador	Arequipa, Peru
18:00 UTC−05:00		Report		Stadium: Estadio Monumental Virgen de Chapi; Referee: Marlon Escalante (Venezuela)

February 9 Final Stage	Ecuador	0–1	Brazil	Arequipa, Peru
21:10 UTC−05:00		Report	Casimiro 8'	Stadium: Estadio Monumental Virgen de Chapi; Referee: Victor Hugo Carrillo (Peru)

February 12 Final Stage	Ecuador	1–0	Chile	Arequipa, Peru
19:00 UTC−05:00	Arroyo 71'	Report		Stadium: Estadio Monumental Virgen de Chapi; Referee: Wilmar Roldán (Colombia)

==== FIFA U-20 World Cup ====
Ecuador qualified for the 2011 FIFA U-20 World Cup in Colombia. They draw was held on April 27 and Ecuador was drawn into Group C with Australia, Costa Rica, and Spain.

Group C standings
Team	Pld	W	D	L	GF	GA	GD	Pts
Spain	3	3	0	0	11	2	+9	9
Ecuador	3	1	1	1	4	3	+1	4
Costa Rica	3	1	0	2	4	9	−5	3
Australia	3	0	1	2	4	9	−5	1

July 31 Group Stage	Australia	1–1	Ecuador	Manizales, Colombia
18:00 UTC−05:00	Oar 89'	Report	Govea 24'	Stadium: Estadio Palogrande; Attendance: 17,077; Referee: Djamel Haimoudi (Algeria)

August 3 Group Stage	Ecuador	0–2	Spain	Manizales, Colombia
17:00 UTC−05:00		Report	Canales 67'; Vázquez 85'	Stadium: Estadio Palogrande; Referee: Peter O'Leary (New Zealand)

August 6 Group Stage	Ecuador	3–0	Costa Rica	Pereira, Colombia
17:00 UTC−05:00	Montaño 2' de Jesús 13', 69'	Report		Stadium: Estadio Hernán Ramírez Villegas; Attendance: 13,708; Referee: Cüneyt Çakır (Turkey)

August 10 Round of 16	France	1–0	Ecuador	Cartagena, Colombia
20:00 UTC−05:00	Griezmann 75'	Report		Stadium: Estadio Jaime Morón León; Attendance: 15,881; Referee: Kim Dong-Jin (South Korea)

=== Under-17 team ===
==== South American Under-17 Football Championship ====
Group A standings
Team	Pld	W	D	L	GF	GA	GD	Pts
Argentina	4	3	0	1	10	4	+6	9
Ecuador	4	2	1	1	4	4	0	7
Uruguay	4	2	0	2	4	5	–1	6
Peru	4	1	1	2	8	9	–1	4
Bolivia	4	1	0	3	5	9	–4	3

March 12 First Stage	Ecuador	2–1	Bolivia	Latacunga, Ecuador
16:00 UTC−05:00	Batioja 22'; Mercado 24'	Report	Silva 49'	Stadium: Estadio La Cocha; Referee: Ricardo Márquez (Brazil)

March 15 First Stage	Peru	1–1	Ecuador	Ambato, Ecuador
17:00 UTC−05:00	Polo 57'	Report	Sarnoza 47'	Stadium: Estadio Bellavista; Referee: Héctor Parra (Colombia)

March 21 First Stage	Ecuador	1–0	Uruguay	Latacunga, Ecuador
17:00 UTC−05:00	Sornoza 16'	Report		Stadium: Estadio La Cocha; Referee: Patricio Polic (Chile)

March 24 First Stage	Argentina	2–0	Ecuador	Latacunga, Ecuador
19:10 UTC−05:00	Pinto 52'; Benítez 72'	Report		Stadium: Estadio La Cocha; Referee: Julio Quintana (Paraguay)

Final Group standings
Team	Pld	W	D	L	GF	GA	GD	Pts
Brazil	5	4	1	0	10	4	+6	13
Uruguay	5	2	3	0	8	5	+3	9
Argentina	5	2	1	2	7	7	0	7
Ecuador	5	1	3	1	6	7	–1	6
Colombia	5	1	1	3	5	7	–2	4
Paraguay	5	0	1	4	5	11	–6	1

March 28 Final Stage	Ecuador	0–0	Colombia	Latacunga, Ecuador
18:00 UTC−05:00		Report		Stadium: Estadio La Cocha; Referee: Mayker Gómez (Venezuela)

March 31 Final Stage	Ecuador	2–2	Paraguay	Quito, Ecuador
18:00 UTC−05:00	Batioja 27'; Uchuari 83'	Report	Ovelar 77'; Caballero 85'	Stadium: Estadio Olímpico Atahualpa; Referee: Néstor Pitana (Argentina)

April 3 Final Stage	Brazil	3–1	Ecuador	Latacunga, Ecuador
18:00 UTC−05:00	Matheus 24'; Leonardo 28'; Adryan 54' (pen.)	Report	Cevallos 90+4'	Stadium: Estadio La Cocha; Referee: Héctor Martínez (Uruguay)

April 6 Final Stage	Argentina	1–2	Ecuador	Quito, Ecuador
18:00 UTC−05:00	Pugh 83'	Report	Cevallos 54'; Batioja 73'	Stadium: Estadio Olímpico Atahualpa; Referee: Patricio Polic (Chile)

April 9 Final Stage	Ecuador	1–1	Uruguay	Quito, Ecuador
18:00 UTC−05:00	Cevallos 58'	Report	San Martín 19'	Stadium: Estadio de Liga Deportiva Universitaria; Referee: Héctor Parra (Colombia)

==== FIFA U-17 World Cup ====
Ecuador qualified for the 2011 FIFA U-17 World Cup. The draw was held on May 17 and Ecuador was drawn into Group E with Burkina Faso, Germany, and Panama.

Group E standings
Team	Pld	W	D	L	GF	GA	GD	Pts
Germany	3	3	0	0	11	1	+10	9
Ecuador	3	2	0	1	5	7	–2	6
Panama	3	1	0	2	2	4	–2	3
Burkina Faso	3	0	0	3	0	6	–6	0

June 20 Group Stage	Germany	6–1	Ecuador	Estadio Corregidora, Querétaro
15:00 UTC−05:00	Yesil 31', 69'; Roecker 54'; Ayçiçek 61'; Ducksch 85'; Aydin 90'	Report	Guerzo 51'	Attendance: 23,500; Referee: Elmer Bonilla (El Salvador)

June 23 Group Stage	Panama	1–2	Ecuador	Querétaro, Mexico
18:00 UTC−05:00	Aguilar 22'	Report	Jaime 61'; Cevallos 82'	Stadium: Estadio Corregidora; Attendance: 18,650; Referee: Nawaf Ghayyath Shukralla (Bahrain)

June 26 Group Stage	Burkina Faso	0–2	Ecuador	Guadalajara, Mexico
15:00 UTC−05:00		Report	Cevallos 74'; Mercado 76'	Stadium: Estadio Omnilife; Attendance: 15,165; Referee: Alexey Nikolaev (Russia)

June 29 Round of 16	Brazil	2–0	Ecuador	Guadalajara, Mexico
15:00 UTC−05:00	Ademilson 16'; Léo 87'	Report		Stadium: Estadio Omnilife; Attendance: 19,335; Referee: Pavel Kralovec (Czech Republic)

==== Pan American Games ====
Ecuador qualified for the 2011 Pan American Games.
