= 2011 Copa Sudamericana preliminary stages =

The preliminary stages of the 2011 Copa Bridgestone Sudamericana de Clubes consisted of two stages:

- First Stage (first legs: August 2–4, 9, 18; second legs: August 11, 16–18, 23, 25)
- Second Stage, divided into three sections:
  - Argentina (first legs: August 30 – September 1; second legs: September 6–8)
  - Brazil (first legs: August 10–11; second legs: August 23–25)
  - Rest of South America (first legs: August 30, September 1, 8, 13, 15; second legs: September 14, 20–22)

== Format ==
The draw was made in Buenos Aires on June 28, 2011. Sixteen teams (all from rest of South America) competed in the First Stage, where they were drawn into eight ties. The eight winners of the First Stage joined another twenty-two teams (six from Argentina, eight from Brazil, eight from rest of South America) to compete in the Second Stage, where they were drawn into fifteen ties.

Teams played in two-legged ties on a home-away basis. Each team earned 3 points for a win, 1 point for a draw, and 0 points for a loss. The following criteria were used for breaking ties on points:

1. Goal difference
2. Away goals
3. Penalty shootout (no extra time is played)

The fifteen winners of the Second Stage advanced to the round of 16 to join the defending champion Independiente.

== First stage ==
Team 1 played the second leg at home.

Team 1	Agg.	Team 2	1st leg	2nd leg
Nacional (Paraguay)	1–0	(Bolivia) San José	0–0	1–0
Santa Fe (Colombia)	3–1	(Peru) Universidad César Vallejo	1–1	2–0
Fénix (Uruguay)	0–1	Universidad de Chile	0–1	0–0
Deportivo Anzoátegui (Venezuela)	2–1	(Ecuador) Deportivo Quito	0–1	2–0
The Strongest (Bolivia)	2–3	(Paraguay) Olimpia	0–2	2–1
Juan Aurich (Peru)	1–4	(Colombia) La Equidad	0–2	1–2
Universidad Católica (Chile)	4–1	(Uruguay) Bella Vista	1–1	3–0
LDU Quito (Ecuador)	2–1	(Venezuela) Yaracuyanos	1–1	1–0

=== Match A ===
August 3, 2011
18:00 UTC−04:00

San José (Bolivia)	0–0	(Paraguay) Nacional
	Report

Estadio Jesús Bermúdez, Oruro
Referee: Omar Ponce (Ecuador)

August 17, 2011
21:00 UTC−04:00

Nacional (Paraguay)	1–0	(Bolivia) San José
Torales 4'	Report

Estadio Defensores del Chaco, Asunción
Referee: Patricio Polic (Chile)

Nacional won on points 4–1.

=== Match B ===
August 2, 2011
20:00 UTC−05:00

Universidad César Vallejo (Peru)	1–1	(Colombia) Santa Fe
Leguizamón 3'	Report	Rodas 51'

Estadio Mansiche, Trujillo
Referee: Alfredo Intriago (Ecuador)

August 23, 2011
20:45 UTC−05:00

Santa Fe (Colombia)	2–0	(Peru) Universidad César Vallejo
Rey 54'; Rodas 72'	Report

Estadio Nemesio Camacho "El Campín", Bogotá
Referee: Juan Soto (Venezuela)

Santa Fe won on points 4–1.

=== Match C ===
August 9, 2011
21:00 UTC−04:00

Universidad de Chile	1–0	(Uruguay) Fénix
E. Vargas 54'	Report

Estadio Nacional Julio Martínez Prádanos, Santiago
Referee: Julio Quintana (Paraguay)

August 18, 2011
19:15 UTC−03:00

Fénix (Uruguay)	0–0	Universidad de Chile
	Report

Estadio Luis Franzini, Montevideo
Referee: Heber Lopes (Brazil)

Universidad de Chile won on points 4–1.

=== Match D ===
August 3, 2011
17:00 UTC−05:00

Deportivo Quito (Ecuador)	1–0	(Venezuela) Deportivo Anzoátegui
Bevacqua 61'	Report

Estadio Olímpico Atahualpa, Quito
Referee: Imer Machado (Colombia)

August 16, 2011
21:15 UTC−04:30

Deportivo Anzoátegui (Venezuela)	2–0	(Ecuador) Deportivo Quito
Hernández 1'; Checa 90+1' (o.g.)	Report

Estadio José Antonio Anzoátegui, Puerto La Cruz
Referee: Enrique Osses (Chile)

Tied on points 3–3, Deportivo Anzoátegui won on goal difference.

=== Match E ===
August 3, 2011
20:15 UTC−04:00

Olimpia (Paraguay)	2–0	(Bolivia) The Strongest
Cáceres 66'; Romero 79'	Report

Estadio Defensores del Chaco, Asunción
Referee: Martín Vázquez (Uruguay)

August 11, 2011
18:30 UTC−04:00

The Strongest (Bolivia)	2–1	(Paraguay) Olimpia
Chumacero 30'; Escobar 48'	Report	Romero 56'

Estadio Hernando Siles, La Paz
Referee: Víctor Rivera (Peru)

Tied on points 3–3, Olimpia won on goal difference.

=== Match F ===
August 18, 2011
19:45 UTC−05:00

La Equidad (Colombia)	2–0	(Peru) Juan Aurich
Mosquera 20'; Núñez 79'	Report

Estadio Metropolitano de Techo, Bogotá
Referee: Marlon Escalante (Venezuela)

August 25, 2011
20:45 UTC−05:00

Juan Aurich (Peru)	1–2	(Colombia) La Equidad
Montes 15'	Report	Guazá 74'; Núñez 90+2' (pen.)

Estadio Elías Aguirre, Chiclayo
Referee: Joaquín Antequera (Bolivia)

La Equidad won on points 6–0.

=== Match G ===
August 2, 2011
19:45 UTC−03:00

Bella Vista (Uruguay)	1–1	(Chile) Universidad Católica
Nicolini 23' (pen.)	Report	Calandria 35'

Estadio Luis Franzini, Montevideo
Referee: Leandro Vuaden (Brazil)

August 16, 2011
19:15 UTC−04:00

Universidad Católica (Chile)	3–0	(Uruguay) Bella Vista
Carignano 4', 64'; Mier 10'	Report

Estadio San Carlos de Apoquindo, Santiago
Referee: Víctor Hugo Carrillo (Peru)

Universidad Católica won on points 4–1.

=== Match H ===
August 4, 2011
19:45 UTC−04:30

Yaracuyanos (Venezuela)	1–1	(Ecuador) LDU Quito
Chalar 78'	Report	Barcos 64' (pen.)

Estadio Metropolitano de Fútbol de Lara, Barquisimeto
Referee: Georges Buckley (Peru)

August 17, 2011
17:00 UTC−05:00

LDU Quito (Ecuador)	1–0	(Venezuela) Yaracuyanos
Vera 19'	Report

Estadio Casa Blanca, Quito
Referee: Raúl Orosco (Bolivia)

LDU Quito won on points 4–1.

== Second stage ==
Team 1 played the second leg at home.

Team 1	Agg.	Team 2	1st leg	2nd leg
Vélez Sársfield (Argentina)	4–0	(Argentina) Argentinos Juniors	0–0	4–0
Nacional (Uruguay)	0–3	Universidad de Chile	0–1	0–2
Palmeiras (Brazil)	3–3 (a)	(Brazil) Vasco da Gama	0–2	3–1
Libertad (Paraguay)	2–0	(Colombia) La Equidad	1–0	1–0
Universitario (Peru)	4–1	(Venezuela) Deportivo Anzoátegui	2–1	2–0
Estudiantes (Argentina)	1–2	(Argentina) Arsenal	0–2	1–0
Deportivo Cali (Colombia)	2–2 (5–6 p)	(Colombia) Santa Fe	1–1	1–1
Botafogo (Brazil)	3–1	(Brazil) Atlético Mineiro	2–1	1–0
Emelec (Ecuador)	2–4	(Paraguay) Olimpia	1–2	1–2
Godoy Cruz (Argentina)	2–2 (a)	(Argentina) Lanús	2–2	0–0
Trujillanos (Venezuela)	1–5	(Ecuador) LDU Quito	1–4	0–1
São Paulo (Brazil)	4–2	(Brazil) Ceará	1–2	3–0
Aurora (Bolivia)	6–3	(Paraguay) Nacional	1–1	5–2
Atlético Paranaense (Brazil)	0–2	(Brazil) Flamengo	0–1	0–1
Iquique (Chile)	1–2	(Chile) Universidad Católica	1–2	0–0

=== Match O1 ===
September 1, 2011
20:15 UTC−03:00

Argentinos Juniors (Argentina)	0–0	(Argentina) Vélez Sársfield
	Report

Estadio Diego Armando Maradona, Buenos Aires
Referee: Diego Abal (Argentina)

September 8, 2011
19:15 UTC−03:00

Vélez Sársfield (Argentina)	4–0	(Argentina) Argentinos Juniors
Franco 23'; Fernández 55'; Martínez 74' (pen.); Canteros 84'	Report

Estadio José Amalfitani, Buenos Aires
Referee: Sergio Pezzotta (Argentina)

Vélez Sársfield won on points 4–1.

=== Match O2 ===
September 13, 2011
21:15 UTC−03:00

Universidad de Chile	1–0	(Uruguay) Nacional
E. Vargas 59'	Report

Estadio Nacional Julio Martínez Prádanos, Santiago
Referee: Paulo Oliveira (Brazil)

September 21, 2011
19:15 UTC−03:00

Nacional (Uruguay)	0–2	Universidad de Chile
	Report	E. Vargas 11'; Rodríguez 12'

Estadio Gran Parque Central, Montevideo
Referee: Antonio Arias (Paraguay)

Note: The second leg was suspended at the start of the second half by the referee after a projectile hit a linesman.
Universidad de Chile won on points 6–0.

=== Match O3 ===
August 11, 2011
21:50 UTC−03:00

Vasco da Gama (Brazil)	2–0	(Brazil) Palmeiras
Diego Souza 42'; Élton 79'	Report

Estádio São Januário, Rio de Janeiro
Referee: Leandro Vuaden (Brazil)

August 25, 2011
20:15 UTC−03:00

Palmeiras (Brazil)	3–1	(Brazil) Vasco da Gama
Luan 13'; Kléber 53'; Marcos Assunção 90+2'	Report	Jumar 57'

Estádio Municipal Paulo Machado de Carvalho (Pacaembú), São Paulo
Referee: Heber Lopes (Brazil)

Tied on points 3–3, Vasco da Gama won on away goals.

=== Match O4 ===
September 13, 2011
21:30 UTC−05:00

La Equidad (Colombia)	0–1	(Paraguay) Libertad
	Report	Ramírez 77'

Estadio Nemesio Camacho "El Campín", Bogotá
Referee: Carlos Vera (Ecuador)

September 21, 2011
20:45 UTC−04:00

Libertad (Paraguay)	1–0	(Colombia) La Equidad
Canuto 18'	Report

Estadio Dr. Nicolás Léoz, Asunción
Referee: Enrique Osses (Chile)

Libertad won on points 6–0.

=== Match O6 ===
September 1, 2011
21:15 UTC−04:30

Deportivo Anzoátegui (Venezuela)	1–2	(Peru) Universitario
Maita 74'	Report	Ampuero 30'; Fano 49'

Estadio José Antonio Anzoátegui, Puerto La Cruz
Referee: Alfredo Intriago (Ecuador)

September 14, 2011
17:15 UTC−05:00

Universitario (Peru)	2–0	(Venezuela) Deportivo Anzoátegui
Ruidíaz 74'; Vitti 81'	Report

Estadio Monumental "U", Lima
Referee: José Buitrago (Colombia)

Universitario won on points 6–0.

=== Match O7 ===
August 30, 2011
21:15 UTC−03:00

Arsenal (Argentina)	2–0	(Argentina) Estudiantes
Leguizamón 49'; Burdisso 74'	Report

Estadio Julio Humberto Grondona, Sarandí
Referee: Gabriel Favale (Argentina)

September 6, 2011
21:15 UTC−03:00

Estudiantes (Argentina)	1–0	(Argentina) Arsenal
Sánchez 62'	Report

Estadio Ciudad de La Plata, La Plata
Referee: Pablo Lunati (Argentina)

Tied on points 3–3, Arsenal won on goal difference.

=== Match O8 ===
September 15, 2011
20:45 UTC−05:00

Santa Fe (Colombia)	1–1	(Colombia) Deportivo Cali
Pérez 57' (pen.)	Report	Belalcázar 86'

Estadio Nemesio Camacho "El Campín", Bogotá
Referee: Adrián Vélez (Colombia)

September 22, 2011
20:45 UTC−05:00

Deportivo Cali (Colombia)	1–1	(Colombia) Santa Fe
Roa 14' (o.g.)	Report	Rey 66'
Penalties
Pérez (penalty scored); Martínez (penalty scored); Amaya (penalty scored); Belalcázar (penalty scored); Fernández (penalty scored); Burbano (penalty missed)	5–6	(penalty scored) Pérez; (penalty scored) Roa; (penalty scored) Bernal; (penalty scored) Vélez; (penalty scored) Anchico; (penalty scored) Acosta

Estadio Pascual Guerrero, Cali
Referee: Wilmar Roldán (Colombia)

Tied on points 2–2, Santa Fe won on penalties.

=== Match O9 ===
August 10, 2011
21:50 UTC−03:00

Atlético Mineiro (Brazil)	1–2	(Brazil) Botafogo
Richarlyson 45+1'	Report	Herrera 7'; Maicosuel 39'

Ipatingão, Ipatinga
Referee: Paulo Oliveira (Brazil)

August 23, 2011
20:15 UTC−03:00

Botafogo (Brazil)	1–0	(Brazil) Atlético Mineiro
Herrera 45+2' (pen.)	Report

Estádio Olímpico João Havelange (Engenhão), Rio de Janeiro
Referee: Wilson Seneme (Brazil)

Botafogo won on points 6–0.

=== Match O10 ===
September 15, 2011
19:15 UTC−04:00

Olimpia (Paraguay)	2–1	(Ecuador) Emelec
Marín 14', 71'	Report	Vigneri 39'

Estadio Defensores del Chaco, Asunción
Referee: Roberto Silvera (Uruguay)

September 20, 2011
19:45 UTC−05:00

Emelec (Ecuador)	1–2	(Paraguay) Olimpia
Franco 68'	Report	Ortiz 6'; Zeballos 25'

Estadio George Capwell, Guayaquil
Referee: José Buitrago (Colombia)

Note: The second leg was abandoned after 81 minutes by the referee due to objects thrown onto the field.
Olimpia won on points 6–0.

=== Match O11 ===
August 31, 2011
21:15 UTC−03:00

Lanús (Argentina)	2–2	(Argentina) Godoy Cruz
González 19'; Neira 90+1'	Report	Rojas 26'; Navarro 34'

Estadio Ciudad de Lanús, Lanús
Referee: Juan Pompei (Argentina)

September 7, 2011
21:45 UTC−03:00

Godoy Cruz (Argentina)	0–0	(Argentina) Lanús
	Report

Estadio Malvinas Argentinas, Mendoza
Referee: Néstor Pitana (Argentina)

Tied on points 2–2, Godoy Cruz won on away goals.

=== Match O12 ===
September 13, 2011
17:00 UTC−05:00

LDU Quito (Ecuador)	4–1	(Venezuela) Trujillanos
Barcos 25', 43', 90+1' (pen.); González 87'	Report	Falcón 1'

Estadio Casa Blanca, Quito
Referee: Víctor Hugo Carrillo (Peru)

September 22, 2011
18:45 UTC−04:30

Trujillanos (Venezuela)	0–1	(Ecuador) LDU Quito
	Report	L. Bolaños 30'

Estadio José Alberto Pérez, Valera
Referee: Darío Ubriaco (Uruguay)

LDU Quito won on points 6–0.

=== Match O13 ===
August 10, 2011
19:30 UTC−03:00

Ceará (Brazil)	2–1	(Brazil) São Paulo
Rudnei 44'; Nicácio 90+3'	Report	Rivaldo 22'

Estádio Presidente Vargas, Fortaleza
Referee: Sandro Ricci (Brazil)

August 24, 2011
21:50 UTC−03:00

São Paulo (Brazil)	3–0	(Brazil) Ceará
Cícero 57'; Lucas 62'; Dagoberto 65'	Report

Estádio Cícero Pompeu de Toledo (Morumbi), São Paulo
Referee: Marcelo de Lima Henrique (Brazil)

Tied on points 3–3, São Paulo won on goal difference.

=== Match O14 ===
August 30, 2011
18:00 UTC−04:00

Nacional (Paraguay)	1–1	(Bolivia) Aurora
González 67'	Report	Villalba 5'

Estadio Defensores del Chaco, Asunción
Referee: Darío Ubriaco (Uruguay)

September 20, 2011
18:15 UTC−04:00

Aurora (Bolivia)	5–2	(Paraguay) Nacional
Reynoso 21'; Peña 26' (pen.); Sanjurjo 38'; Andaveris 73'; Cardozo 90'	Report	Rodrigo Teixeira 7', 32'

Estadio Félix Capriles, Cochabamba
Referee: Víctor Rivera (Peru)

Aurora won on points 4–1.

=== Match O15 ===
August 10, 2011
21:50 UTC−03:00

Flamengo (Brazil)	1–0	(Brazil) Atlético Paranaense
Ronaldinho 81' (pen.)	Report

Estádio Olímpico João Havelange (Engenhão), Rio de Janeiro
Referee: Ricardo Marques (Brazil)

August 24, 2011
21:50 UTC−03:00

Atlético Paranaense (Brazil)	0–1	(Brazil) Flamengo
	Report	Ronaldinho 73'

Estádio Joaquim Américo Guimarães (Arena da Baixada), Curitiba
Referee: Sálvio Fagundes (Brazil)

Flamengo won on points 6–0.

=== Match O16 ===
September 8, 2011
21:45 UTC−03:00

Universidad Católica (Chile)	2–1	(Chile) Iquique
Mirosevic 37'; Andía 51'	Report	Ríos 81'

Estadio San Carlos de Apoquindo, Santiago
Referee: Julio Bascuñán (Chile)

September 14, 2011
21:50 UTC−03:00

Iquique (Chile)	0–0	(Chile) Universidad Católica
	Report

Estadio Tierra de Campeones, Iquique
Referee: Eduardo Gamboa (Chile)

Universidad Católica won on points 4–1.
