= 2011 Copa Libertadores Second Stage =

The Second Stage of the 2011 Copa Santander Libertadores de América ran from February 9 to April 20, 2011 (match days: February 9, 15–17, 22–24, March 1–3, 8–10, 15–17, 22–24, 30–31, April 5–7, 12–14, 19–20).

== Format ==
Twenty-six teams qualified directly into this round, to be joined by the six winners of the first stage. The thirty-two teams were drawn into eight groups of four on November 25, 2010, in Asunción.

The teams in each group played each other in a double round-robin format, playing the other teams in the group once at home and once away. Each team earned 3 points for a win, 1 point for a draw, and 0 points for a loss. The following criteria were used for breaking ties on points:

1. Goal difference
2. Goals scored
3. Away goals
4. Drawing of lots

The top two teams from each group advanced to the round of 16.

== Groups ==
=== Group 1 ===
Pos	Team	Pld	W	D	L	GF	GA	GD	Pts	LIB	OCA	USM	SLU
1	(Paraguay) Libertad	6	4	2	0	13	5	+8	14		2–2	5–1	2–0
2	(Colombia) Once Caldas	6	1	4	1	7	8	−1	7	1–1		0–3	1–1
3	(Peru) Universidad San Martín	6	2	0	4	7	11	−4	6	0–1	0–2		2–0
4	(Mexico) San Luis	6	1	2	3	6	9	−3	5	1–2	1–1	3–1	

Legend: Blue = home team win; Yellow = draw; Red = away team win.
February 15, 2011
18:45 UTC−06:00

San Luis (Mexico)	1–2	(Paraguay) Libertad
Cavallo 38'	Report	Pavlovich 18'; Aquino 54' (pen.)

Estadio Alfonso Lastras, San Luis Potosí
Attendance: 12,198
Referee: José Buitrago (Colombia)
February 16, 2011
21:15 UTC−05:00

Once Caldas (Colombia)	0–3	(Peru) Universidad San Martín
	Report	Arriola 37', 59'; Alemanno 41'

Estadio Palogrande, Manizales
Attendance: 7,689
Referee: Sergio Pezzotta (Argentina)

February 22, 2011
19:30 UTC−05:00

Universidad San Martín (Peru)	2–0	(Mexico) San Luis
Labarthe 84'; Marinelli 89'	Report

Estadio Miguel Grau, Callao
Attendance: 5,000
Referee: Wilson Seneme (Brazil)
February 22, 2011
21:45 UTC−05:00

Once Caldas (Colombia)	1–1	(Paraguay) Libertad
Moreno 28'	Report	Ayala 90+4'

Estadio Palogrande, Manizales
Attendance: 6,226
Referee: Saúl Laverni (Argentina)

March 2, 2011
21:15 UTC−06:00

San Luis (Mexico)	1–1	(Colombia) Once Caldas
Arroyo 17'	Report	Rentería 2'

Estadio Alfonso Lastras, San Luis Potosí
Attendance: 6,522
Referee: Joaquín Antequera (Bolivia)
March 8, 2011
19:15 UTC−03:00

Libertad (Paraguay)	5–1	(Peru) Universidad San Martín
Rojas 14'; Orue 18'; Maciel 28'; Ayala 50'; Pouso 84'	Report	Alemanno 4'

Estadio Dr. Nicolás Léoz, Asunción
Attendance: 2,317
Referee: Roberto Silvera (Uruguay)

March 15, 2011
17:15 UTC−05:00

Universidad San Martín (Peru)	0–1	(Paraguay) Libertad
	Report	Aquino 23' (pen.)

Estadio Miguel Grau, Callao
Attendance: 1,414
Referee: Heber Lopes (Brazil)
March 15, 2011
21:45 UTC−05:00

Once Caldas (Colombia)	1–1	(Mexico) San Luis
Nuñez 78'	Report	Medina 90+3'

Estadio Palogrande, Manizales
Attendance: 6,906
Referee: Omar Ponce (Ecuador)

March 22, 2011
21:15 UTC−03:00

Libertad (Paraguay)	2–2	(Colombia) Once Caldas
Pavlovich 15', 90+2'	Report	Rentería 11', 17'

Estadio Dr. Nicolás Léoz, Asunción
Attendance: 1,240
Referee: Líber Prudente (Uruguay)
March 22, 2011
20:30 UTC−06:00

San Luis (Mexico)	3–1	(Peru) Universidad San Martín
Medina 2'; Arroyo 13', 74'	Report	Quinteros 60'

Estadio Alfonso Lastras, San Luis Potosí
Attendance: 2,750
Referee: Diego Abal (Argentina)

April 19, 2011
21:30 UTC−04:00

Libertad (Paraguay)	2–0	(Mexico) San Luis
González 10'; Pavlovich 16'	Report

Estadio Dr. Nicolás Léoz, Asunción
Attendance: 474
Referee: Salvio Fagundes (Brazil)
April 19, 2011
20:30 UTC−05:00

Universidad San Martín (Peru)	0–2	(Colombia) Once Caldas
	Report	Rentería 16'; Mirabaje 76'

Estadio Miguel Grau, Callao
Attendance: 1,904
Referee: Enrique Osses (Chile)

=== Group 2 ===
Pos	Team	Pld	W	D	L	GF	GA	GD	Pts	JUN	GRE	OPE	LHU
1	(Colombia) Junior	6	4	1	1	9	7	+2	13		2–1	2–1	1–1
2	(Brazil) Grêmio	6	3	1	2	9	6	+3	10	2–0		3–0	2–0
3	(Bolivia) Oriente Petrolero	6	2	0	4	7	8	−1	6	1–2	3–0		2–0
4	(Peru) León de Huánuco	6	1	2	3	4	8	−4	5	1–2	1–1	1–0	

Legend: Blue = home team win; Yellow = draw; Red = away team win.
February 17, 2011
14:30 UTC−05:00

León de Huánuco (Peru)	1–2	(Colombia) Junior
Elías 86'	Report	Viáfara 23'; Bacca 65'

Estadio Heraclio Tapia, Huánuco
Attendance: 11,115
Referee: Paulo Oliveira (Brazil)
February 17, 2011
19:45 UTC−02:00

Grêmio (Brazil)	3–0	(Bolivia) Oriente Petrolero
Douglas 43' (pen.), 70'; Gilson 48'	Report

Estádio Olímpico Monumental, Porto Alegre
Attendance: 32,791
Referee: Líber Prudente (Uruguay)

February 23, 2011
15:15 UTC−05:00

León de Huánuco (Peru)	1–0	(Bolivia) Oriente Petrolero
Zegarra 36'	Report

Estadio Heraclio Tapia, Huánuco
Attendance: 5,964
Referee: Marlon Escalante (Venezuela)
February 24, 2011
21:45 UTC−05:00

Junior (Colombia)	2–1	(Brazil) Grêmio
Hernández 28'; Viáfara 74'	Report	Borges 4'

Estadio Metropolitano Roberto Meléndez, Barranquilla
Attendance: 20,348
Referee: Marco Rodríguez (Mexico)

March 3, 2011
20:15 UTC−03:00

Grêmio (Brazil)	2–0	(Peru) León de Huánuco
André Lima 41'; Borges 54' (pen.)	Report

Estádio Olímpico Monumental, Porto Alegre
Attendance: 26,455
Referee: Enrique Osses (Chile)
March 9, 2011
18:30 UTC−04:00

Oriente Petrolero (Bolivia)	1–2	(Colombia) Junior
Arce 90+1'	Report	Cortés 27'; Páez 46'

Estadio Ramón Tahuichi Aguilera, Santa Cruz
Attendance: 10,668
Referee: Gabriel Favale (Argentina)

March 17, 2011
15:00 UTC−05:00

León de Huánuco (Peru)	1–1	(Brazil) Grêmio
Elías 43'	Report	Carlos Alberto 54'

Estadio Heraclio Tapia, Huánuco
Attendance: 9,684
Referee: Roberto García (Mexico)
March 17, 2011
21:45 UTC−05:00

Junior (Colombia)	2–1	(Bolivia) Oriente Petrolero
Bacca 64', 72' (pen.)	Report	Campos 48'

Estadio Metropolitano Roberto Meléndez, Barranquilla
Attendance: 13,155
Referee: Juan Soto (Venezuela)

March 24, 2011
18:30 UTC−04:00

Oriente Petrolero (Bolivia)	2–0	(Peru) León de Huánuco
Peña 16'; Campos 77'	Report

Estadio Ramón Tahuichi Aguilera, Santa Cruz
Attendance: 2,020
Referee: Alfredo Intriago (Ecuador)
April 7, 2011
19:15 UTC−03:00

Grêmio (Brazil)	2–0	(Colombia) Junior
Lúcio 33'; Borges 60'	Report

Estádio Olímpico Monumental, Porto Alegre
Attendance: 28,798
Referee: Héctor Baldassi (Argentina)

April 14, 2011
21:45 UTC−04:00

Oriente Petrolero (Bolivia)	3–0	(Brazil) Grêmio
Fernández 50'; Saucedo 75'; Arce 79'	Report

Estadio Ramón Tahuichi Aguilera, Santa Cruz
Attendance: 3,360
Referee: Omar Ponce (Ecuador)
April 14, 2011
20:45 UTC−05:00

Junior (Colombia)	1–1	(Peru) León de Huánuco
Gómez 75'	Report	Rodríguez 84'

Estadio Metropolitano Roberto Meléndez, Barranquilla
Attendance: 7,626
Referee: Carlos Vera (Ecuador)

=== Group 3 ===
Pos	Team	Pld	W	D	L	GF	GA	GD	Pts	AME	FLU	NAC	ARG
1	(Mexico) América	6	3	1	2	8	7	+1	10		1–0	2–0	2–1
2	(Brazil) Fluminense	6	2	2	2	9	9	0	8	3–2		0–0	2–2
3	(Uruguay) Nacional	6	2	2	2	3	3	0	8	0–0	2–0		0–1
4	(Argentina) Argentinos Juniors	6	2	1	3	9	10	−1	7	3–1	2–4	0–1	

Legend: Blue = home team win; Yellow = draw; Red = away team win.
February 9, 2011
22:00 UTC−02:00

Fluminense (Brazil)	2–2	(Argentina) Argentinos Juniors
Rafael Moura 57', 73'	Report	Niell 44', 70'

Estádio Olímpico João Havelange (Engenhão), Rio de Janeiro
Attendance: 15,939
Referee: Carlos Torres (Paraguay)
February 15, 2011
21:00 UTC−06:00

América (Mexico)	2–0	(Uruguay) Nacional
Sánchez 3'; Vuoso 48'	Report

Estadio Azteca, Mexico City
Attendance: 18,049
Referee: Óscar Ruiz (Colombia)

February 23, 2011
21:50 UTC−03:00

Fluminense (Brazil)	0–0	(Uruguay) Nacional
	Report

Estádio Olímpico João Havelange (Engenhão), Rio de Janeiro
Attendance: 10,017
Referee: Carlos Amarilla (Paraguay)
February 24, 2011
21:30 UTC−03:00

Argentinos Juniors (Argentina)	3–1	(Mexico) América
Salcedo 45' (pen.), 73'; Sánchez Prette 90+3'	Report	Montenegro 27'

Estadio Diego Armando Maradona, Buenos Aires
Attendance: 4,373
Referee: Víctor Hugo Carrillo (Peru)

March 2, 2011
20:30 UTC−02:00

Nacional (Uruguay)	0–1	(Argentina) Argentinos Juniors
	Report	Niell 21'

Estadio Parque Central, Montevideo
Attendance: 8,991
Referee: Antonio Arias (Paraguay)
March 2, 2011
18:50 UTC−06:00

América (Mexico)	1–0	(Brazil) Fluminense
Márquez 70'	Report

Estadio Azteca, Mexico City
Attendance: 22,099
Referee: Wilmar Roldán (Colombia)

March 15, 2011
21:30 UTC−03:00

Argentinos Juniors (Argentina)	0–1	(Uruguay) Nacional
	Report	García 33'

Estadio Diego Armando Maradona, Buenos Aires
Attendance: 6,834
Referee: Enrique Osses (Chile)
March 23, 2011
21:50 UTC−03:00

Fluminense (Brazil)	3–2	(Mexico) América
Gum 20'; Araújo 79'; Deco 86'	Report	Sánchez 14', 71'

Estádio Olímpico João Havelange (Engenhão), Rio de Janeiro
Attendance: 13,158
Referee: Antonio Arias (Paraguay)

April 6, 2011
21:45 UTC−03:00

Nacional (Uruguay)	2–0	(Brazil) Fluminense
García 50', 66'	Report

Estadio Centenario, Montevideo
Attendance: 44,952
Referee: Óscar Ruiz (Colombia)
April 6, 2011
21:50 UTC−05:00

América (Mexico)	2–1	(Argentina) Argentinos Juniors
Vuoso 72'; Márquez 82'	Report	Niell 48'

Estadio Azteca, Mexico City
Attendance: 19,451
Referee: Carlos Amarilla (Paraguay)

April 20, 2011
21:50 UTC−03:00

Nacional (Uruguay)	0–0	(Mexico) América
	Report

Estadio Centenario, Montevideo
Attendance: 45,779
Referee: Víctor Hugo Carrillo (Peru)
April 20, 2011
21:50 UTC−03:00

Argentinos Juniors (Argentina)	2–4	(Brazil) Fluminense
Salcedo 25' (pen.); Oberman 54'	Report	Júlio César 17'; Fred 40', 88' (pen.); Rafael Moura 68'

Estadio Diego Armando Maradona, Buenos Aires
Attendance: 5,706
Referee: Wilmar Roldán (Colombia)

=== Group 4 ===
Pos	Team	Pld	W	D	L	GF	GA	GD	Pts	UC	VEL	CAR	UE
1	(Chile) Universidad Católica	6	3	2	1	11	9	+2	11		0–0	1–3	2–1
2	(Argentina) Vélez Sársfield	6	3	1	2	12	7	+5	10	3–4		3–0	2–1
3	(Venezuela) Caracas	6	3	0	3	7	10	−3	9	0–2	0–3		2–0
4	(Chile) Unión Española	6	1	1	4	7	11	−4	4	2–2	2–1	1–2	

Legend: Blue = home team win; Yellow = draw; Red = away team win.
February 15, 2011
19:30 UTC−03:00

Vélez Sársfield (Argentina)	3–0	(Venezuela) Caracas
Moralez 44'; Ramírez 59'; Martínez 83' (pen.)	Report

Estadio José Amalfitani, Buenos Aires
Attendance: 7,351
Referee: Enrique Osses (Chile)
February 16, 2011
18:45 UTC−03:00

Unión Española (Chile)	2–2	(Chile) Universidad Católica
Monje 47'; Leal 90' (pen.)	Report	Pratto 66'; Meneses 71'

Estadio Santa Laura, Santiago
Attendance: 10,660
Referee: Claudio Puga (Chile)

March 3, 2011
20:15 UTC−03:00

Vélez Sársfield (Argentina)	3–4	(Chile) Universidad Católica
Ortiz 20'; Fernández 21'; Papa 45+1'	Report	Pratto 1', 87'; Costa 73'; Pizarro 90'

Estadio José Amalfitani, Buenos Aires
Attendance: 8,954
Referee: Carlos Torres (Paraguay)
March 3, 2011
21:00 UTC−04:30

Caracas (Venezuela)	2–0	(Chile) Unión Española
Jiménez 39' (pen.); Barahona 53'	Report

Estadio Olímpico de la UCV, Caracas
Attendance: 10,120
Referee: Carlos Vera (Ecuador)

March 9, 2011
21:45 UTC−03:00

Universidad Católica (Chile)	1–3	(Venezuela) Caracas
Calandria 53'	Report	Cabezas 46', 49'; Barahona 48'

Estadio San Carlos de Apoquindo, Santiago
Attendance: 13,491
Referee: Raúl Orosco (Bolivia)
March 10, 2011
19:15 UTC−03:00

Unión Española (Chile)	2–1	(Argentina) Vélez Sársfield
Ligüera 3'; Leal 25'	Report	Ramírez 68'

Estadio Santa Laura, Santiago
Attendance: 6,209
Referee: Wilson Seneme (Brazil)

March 22, 2011
19:45 UTC−04:30

Caracas (Venezuela)	0–2	(Chile) Universidad Católica
	Report	Villanueva 48'; Pratto 84'

Estadio Olímpico de la UCV, Caracas
Attendance: 18,232
Referee: Paul Delgadillo (Mexico)
March 24, 2011
21:45 UTC−03:00

Vélez Sársfield (Argentina)	2–1	(Chile) Unión Española
Papa 23'; Silva 68'	Report	Delgado 33'

Estadio José Amalfitani, Buenos Aires
Attendance: 5,913
Referee: Salvio Fagundes (Brazil)

April 6, 2011
19:30 UTC−03:00

Unión Española (Chile)	1–2	(Venezuela) Caracas
Jaime 2'	Report	Peña 33'; Martínez 83'

Estadio Santa Laura, Santiago
Attendance: 5,411
Referee: Leandro Vuaden (Brazil)
April 7, 2011
21:30 UTC−03:00

Universidad Católica (Chile)	0–0	(Argentina) Vélez Sársfield
	Report

Estadio San Carlos de Apoquindo, Santiago
Attendance: 11,143
Referee: Jorge Larrionda (Uruguay)

April 14, 2011
20:30 UTC−03:00

Universidad Católica (Chile)	2–1	(Chile) Unión Española
Calandria 48'; Cañete 78'	Report	Harbottle 47'

Estadio San Carlos de Apoquindo, Santiago
Attendance: 10,118
Referee: Jorge Osorio (Chile)
April 14, 2011
19:00 UTC−04:30

Caracas (Venezuela)	0–3	(Argentina) Vélez Sársfield
	Report	Moralez 20'; Silva 46', 54'

Estadio Olímpico de la UCV, Caracas
Attendance: 17,824
Referee: José Buitrago (Colombia)

=== Group 5 ===
Pos	Team	Pld	W	D	L	GF	GA	GD	Pts	CPO	SAN	CC	TAC
1	(Paraguay) Cerro Porteño	6	3	2	1	13	8	+5	11		1–2	5–2	1–1
2	(Brazil) Santos	6	3	2	1	11	8	+3	11	1–1		3–2	3–1
3	(Chile) Colo-Colo	6	3	0	3	15	16	−1	9	2–3	3–2		2–1
4	(Venezuela) Deportivo Táchira	6	0	2	4	5	12	−7	2	0–2	0–0	2–4	

Legend: Blue = home team win; Yellow = draw; Red = away team win.
February 15, 2011
20:45 UTC−04:30

Deportivo Táchira (Venezuela)	0–0	(Brazil) Santos
	Report

Estadio Polideportivo de Pueblo Nuevo, San Cristóbal
Attendance: 30,226
Referee: Carlos Vera (Ecuador)
February 17, 2011
20:00 UTC−03:00

Cerro Porteño (Paraguay)	5–2	(Chile) Colo-Colo
Nanni 1', 68' (pen.) dos Santos 6'; Iturbe 46', 85'	Report	Jorquera 12'; Paredes 73'

Estadio General Pablo Rojas, Asunción
Attendance: 14,597
Referee: Heber Lopes (Brazil)

March 1, 2011
21:00 UTC−04:30

Deportivo Táchira (Venezuela)	2–4	(Chile) Colo-Colo
Gutiérrez 86', 87'	Report	Miralles 20', 45+1'; Paredes 70'; Wílchez 82'

Estadio Polideportivo de Pueblo Nuevo, San Cristóbal
Attendance: 15,323
Referee: Omar Ponce (Ecuador)
March 2, 2011
21:50 UTC−03:00

Santos (Brazil)	1–1	(Paraguay) Cerro Porteño
Elano 54' (pen.)	Report	Nanni 90+1' (pen.)

Estádio Urbano Caldeira (Vila Belmiro), Santos
Attendance: 6,735
Referee: Héctor Baldassi (Argentina)

March 10, 2011
19:15 UTC−03:00

Cerro Porteño (Paraguay)	1–1	(Venezuela) Deportivo Táchira
Nanni 27'	Report	Herrera 61'

Estadio General Pablo Rojas, Asunción
Attendance: 15,499
Referee: Darío Ubriaco (Uruguay)
March 16, 2011
21:50 UTC−03:00

Colo-Colo (Chile)	3–2	(Brazil) Santos
Paredes 26'; Miralles 34'; Scotti 42'	Report	Elano 4'; Neymar 48'

Estadio Monumental David Arellano, Santiago
Attendance: 26,343
Referee: Sergio Pezzotta (Argentina)

April 6, 2011
18:00 UTC−04:30

Deportivo Táchira (Venezuela)	0–2	(Paraguay) Cerro Porteño
	Report	Nanni 20'; Torres 65'

Estadio Polideportivo de Pueblo Nuevo, San Cristóbal
Attendance: 3,587
Referee: Sergio Pezzotta (Argentina)
April 6, 2011
21:45 UTC−03:00

Santos (Brazil)	3–2	(Chile) Colo-Colo
Elano 33'; Danilo 35'; Neymar 51'	Report	Jerez 81'; Rubio 86'

Estádio Urbano Caldeira (Vila Belmiro), Santos
Attendance: 11,871
Referee: Roberto Silvera (Uruguay)

April 12, 2011
21:30 UTC−03:00

Colo-Colo (Chile)	2–1	(Venezuela) Deportivo Táchira
Rubio 6', 22'	Report	Pérez Greco 4'

Estadio Monumental David Arellano, Santiago
Attendance: 17,632
Referee: Héctor Baldassi (Argentina)
April 14, 2011
19:30 UTC−04:00

Cerro Porteño (Paraguay)	1–2	(Brazil) Santos
Benítez 90+3'	Report	Danilo 11'; Maikon Leite 47'

Estadio General Pablo Rojas, Asunción
Attendance: 12,940
Referee: Martín Vázquez (Uruguay)

April 20, 2011
19:30 UTC−03:00

Colo-Colo (Chile)	2–3	(Paraguay) Cerro Porteño
Jorquera 4'; Paredes 20'	Report	Fabbro 42', 87'; Piris 47'

Estadio Monumental David Arellano, Santiago
Attendance: 19,816
Referee: Jorge Larrionda (Uruguay)
April 20, 2011
19:30 UTC−03:00

Santos (Brazil)	3–1	(Venezuela) Deportivo Táchira
Neymar 4'; Jonathan 13'; Danilo 72'	Report	Chacón 69'

Estádio Municipal Paulo Machado de Carvalho (Pacaembú), São Paulo
Attendance: 37,701
Referee: Néstor Pitana (Argentina)

=== Group 6 ===
Pos	Team	Pld	W	D	L	GF	GA	GD	Pts	INT	CHI	EME	WIL
1	(Brazil) Internacional	6	4	1	1	14	3	+11	13		4–0	2–0	3–0
2	(Mexico) Chiapas	6	3	0	3	6	8	−2	9	1–0		2–1	2–0
3	(Ecuador) Emelec	6	2	2	2	4	5	−1	8	1–1	1–0		1–0
4	(Bolivia) Jorge Wilstermann	6	1	1	4	3	11	−8	4	1–4	2–1	0–0	

Legend: Blue = home team win; Yellow = draw; Red = away team win.
February 16, 2011
19:00 UTC−05:00

Emelec (Ecuador)	1–1	(Brazil) Internacional
Giménez 90+5'	Report	Bolatti 79'

Estadio George Capwell, Guayaquil
Attendance: 13,589
Referee: Néstor Pitana (Argentina)
February 16, 2011
20:15 UTC−06:00

Chiapas (Mexico)	2–0	(Bolivia) Jorge Wilstermann
M. Martínez 66'; Esqueda 78'	Report

Estadio Víctor Manuel Reyna, Tuxtla Gutiérrez
Attendance: 6,345
Referee: Juan Soto (Venezuela)

February 22, 2011
19:30 UTC−05:00

Emelec (Ecuador)	1–0	(Bolivia) Jorge Wilstermann
Morante 33'	Report

Estadio George Capwell, Guayaquil
Attendance: 11,679
Referee: Jorge Osorio (Chile)
February 23, 2011
21:50 UTC−03:00

Internacional (Brazil)	4–0	(Mexico) Chiapas
Bolatti 19', 43'; Leandro Damião 65'; Oscar 90'	Report

Estádio José Pinheiro Borda (Beira-Rio), Porto Alegre
Attendance: 26,337
Referee: Roberto Silvera (Uruguay)

March 8, 2011
20:45 UTC−06:00

Chiapas (Mexico)	2–1	(Ecuador) Emelec
Torres 43' (pen.); Salazar 66'	Report	Menéndez 69'

Estadio Víctor Manuel Reyna, Tuxtla Gutiérrez
Attendance: 5,832
Referee: Marlon Escalante (Venezuela)
March 16, 2011
18:30 UTC−04:00

Jorge Wilstermann (Bolivia)	1–4	(Brazil) Internacional
Brown 8'	Report	Brown 16' (o.g.); Leandro Damião 18'; Zé Roberto 24'; Kléber 80'

Estadio Félix Capriles, Cochabamba
Attendance: 19,532
Referee: Enrique Cáceres (Paraguay)

March 16, 2011
19:50 UTC−05:00

Emelec (Ecuador)	1–0	(Mexico) Chiapas
Quiroz 53' (pen.)	Report

Estadio George Capwell, Guayaquil
Attendance: 11,831
Referee: Víctor Hugo Carrillo (Peru)
March 30, 2011
21:50 UTC−03:00

Internacional (Brazil)	3–0	(Bolivia) Jorge Wilstermann
Oscar 18'; D'Alessandro 56'; Zé Roberto 72'	Report

Estádio José Pinheiro Borda (Beira-Rio), Porto Alegre
Attendance: 28,085
Referee: Darío Ubriaco (Uruguay)

April 6, 2011
17:30 UTC−05:00

Chiapas (Mexico)	1–0	(Brazil) Internacional
Salazar 54'	Report

Estadio Víctor Manuel Reyna, Tuxtla Gutiérrez
Attendance: 7,553
Referee: Wilmar Roldán (Colombia)
April 7, 2011
18:15 UTC−04:00

Jorge Wilstermann (Bolivia)	0–0	(Ecuador) Emelec
	Report

Estadio Félix Capriles, Cochabamba
Attendance: 1,171
Referee: Marlon Escalante (Venezuela)

April 19, 2011
19:15 UTC−04:00

Jorge Wilstermann (Bolivia)	2–1	(Mexico) Chiapas
Fábio Mineiro 76'; Torres 81'	Report	Torres 7'

Estadio Félix Capriles, Cochabamba
Attendance: 1,510
Referee: Julio Quintana (Paraguay)
April 19, 2011
20:15 UTC−03:00

Internacional (Brazil)	2–0	(Ecuador) Emelec
Rafael Sóbis 51'; Leandro Damião 84'	Report

Estádio José Pinheiro Borda (Beira-Rio), Porto Alegre
Attendance: 36,175
Referee: Óscar Ruiz (Colombia)

=== Group 7 ===
Pos	Team	Pld	W	D	L	GF	GA	GD	Pts	CRU	EST	TOL	GUA
1	(Brazil) Cruzeiro	6	5	1	0	20	1	+19	16		5–0	6–1	4–0
2	(Argentina) Estudiantes	6	3	1	2	9	11	−2	10	0–3		1–0	5–1
3	(Colombia) Deportes Tolima	6	2	2	2	5	8	−3	8	0–0	1–1		1–0
4	(Paraguay) Guaraní	6	0	0	6	2	16	−14	0	0–2	1–2	0–2	

Legend: Blue = home team win; Yellow = draw; Red = away team win.
February 15, 2011
17:30 UTC−05:00

Deportes Tolima (Colombia)	1–0	(Paraguay) Guaraní
Santoya 83'	Report

Estadio Manuel Murillo Toro, Ibagué
Attendance: 8,021
Referee: Omar Ponce (Ecuador)
February 16, 2011
22:00 UTC−02:00

Cruzeiro (Brazil)	5–0	(Argentina) Estudiantes
Wallyson 1', 82'; Roger 17'; Montillo 38', 58'	Report

Estádio Joaquim Henrique Nogueira (Arena do Jacaré), Sete Lagoas
Attendance: 10,955
Referee: Carlos Amarilla (Paraguay)

February 22, 2011
19:15 UTC−03:00

Cruzeiro (Brazil)	4–0	(Paraguay) Guaraní
Wallyson 29', 63'; Farías 85'; Thiago Ribeiro 88'	Report

Estádio Joaquim Henrique Nogueira (Arena do Jacaré), Sete Lagoas
Attendance: 12,067
Referee: Raúl Orosco (Bolivia)
February 23, 2011
19:30 UTC−03:00

Estudiantes (Argentina)	1–0	(Colombia) Deportes Tolima
Barrientos 44'	Report

Estadio Ciudad de La Plata, La Plata
Attendance: 29,034
Referee: Darío Ubriaco (Uruguay)

March 2, 2011
17:30 UTC−05:00

Deportes Tolima (Colombia)	0–0	(Brazil) Cruzeiro
	Report

Estadio Manuel Murillo Toro, Ibagué
Attendance: 11,233
Referee: Jorge Larrionda (Uruguay)
March 9, 2011
21:45 UTC−03:00

Guaraní (Paraguay)	1–2	(Argentina) Estudiantes
Caballero 43' (pen.)	Report	Barrientos 50'; L. González 53'

Estadio Defensores del Chaco, Asunción
Attendance: 1,078
Referee: Víctor Hugo Carrillo (Peru)

March 16, 2011
21:50 UTC−03:00

Cruzeiro (Brazil)	6–1	(Colombia) Deportes Tolima
Montillo 3'; Wallyson 31'; Roger 61', 70' (pen.); Gilberto 88'; Thiago Ribeiro 90+1'	Report	Marrugo 68'

Estádio Joaquim Henrique Nogueira (Arena do Jacaré), Sete Lagoas
Attendance: 8,198
Referee: Carlos Vera (Ecuador)
March 17, 2011
19:15 UTC−03:00

Estudiantes (Argentina)	5–1	(Paraguay) Guaraní
López 1', 18', 58'; L. González 24', 81'	Report	Ju. Benítez 79'

Estadio Ciudad de La Plata, La Plata
Attendance: 13,318
Referee: Martín Vázquez (Uruguay)

March 30, 2011
17:30 UTC−05:00

Deportes Tolima (Colombia)	1–1	(Argentina) Estudiantes
Noguera 30' (pen.)	Report	F. Fernández 23'

Estadio Manuel Murillo Toro, Ibagué
Attendance: 7,797
Referee: Víctor Rivera (Peru)
March 30, 2011
21:50 UTC−03:00

Guaraní (Paraguay)	0–2	(Brazil) Cruzeiro
	Report	Thiago Ribeiro 15'; Ortigoza 90+2'

Estadio Defensores del Chaco, Asunción
Attendance: 119
Referee: Enrique Osses (Chile)

April 13, 2011
20:50 UTC−04:00

Guaraní (Paraguay)	0–2	(Colombia) Deportes Tolima
	Report	Santoya 48'; Closa 68'

Estadio Defensores del Chaco, Asunción
Attendance: 200
Referee: Joaquín Antequera (Bolivia)
April 13, 2011
21:50 UTC−03:00

Estudiantes (Argentina)	0–3	(Brazil) Cruzeiro
	Report	Thiago Ribeiro 10'; Wallyson 45'; Gilberto 82'

Estadio Ciudad de La Plata, La Plata
Attendance: 14,828
Referee: Roberto Silvera (Uruguay)

=== Group 8 ===
Pos	Team	Pld	W	D	L	GF	GA	GD	Pts	LDU	PEN	IND	GCR
1	(Ecuador) LDU Quito	6	3	1	2	12	4	+8	10		5–0	3–0	2–0
2	(Uruguay) Peñarol	6	3	0	3	6	11	−5	9	1–0		0–1	2–1
3	(Argentina) Independiente	6	2	2	2	7	8	−1	8	1–1	3–0		1–3
4	(Argentina) Godoy Cruz	6	2	1	3	8	10	−2	7	2–1	1–3	1–1	

Legend: Blue = home team win; Yellow = draw; Red = away team win.
February 17, 2011
22:15 UTC−03:00

Godoy Cruz (Argentina)	2–1	(Ecuador) LDU Quito
C. Sánchez 16'; N. Sánchez 59'	Report	Reasco 53'

Estadio Malvinas Argentinas, Mendoza
Attendance: 19,524
Referee: Martín Vázquez (Uruguay)
February 24, 2011
19:15 UTC−03:00

Independiente (Argentina)	3–0	(Uruguay) Peñarol
Parra 46'; Pellerano 70'; Silvera 85'	Report

Estadio Libertadores de América, Avellaneda
Attendance: 21,354
Referee: Salvio Fagundes (Brazil)

March 1, 2011
20:15 UTC−03:00

Godoy Cruz (Argentina)	1–3	(Uruguay) Peñarol
Ramírez 30'	Report	Olivera 1', 41'; Aguiar 67'

Estadio Malvinas Argentinas, Mendoza
Attendance: 12,946
Referee: Paulo Oliveira (Brazil)
March 3, 2011
20:30 UTC−05:00

LDU Quito (Ecuador)	3–0	(Argentina) Independiente
Ambrosi 10'; M. Bolaños 52'; Urrutia 78'	Report

Estadio Casa Blanca, Quito
Attendance: 13,768
Referee: Óscar Ruiz (Colombia)

March 9, 2011
20:30 UTC−02:00

Peñarol (Uruguay)	1–0	(Ecuador) LDU Quito
Aguiar 57'	Report

Estadio Centenario, Montevideo
Attendance: 42,455
Referee: Víctor Rivera (Peru)
March 10, 2011
21:45 UTC−03:00

Independiente (Argentina)	1–3	(Argentina) Godoy Cruz
Parra 15'	Report	Fredes 28' (o.g.); Rojas 32'; Ramírez 56'

Estadio Libertadores de América, Avellaneda
Attendance: 10,625
Referee: Patricio Loustau (Argentina)

March 17, 2011
19:30 UTC−05:00

LDU Quito (Ecuador)	5–0	(Uruguay) Peñarol
Luna 22'; W. Calderon 45+1', 78'; Valdez 58' (o.g.); Barcos 63'	Report

Estadio Casa Blanca, Quito
Attendance: 15,329
Referee: Wilmar Roldán (Colombia)
March 23, 2011
19:30 UTC−03:00

Godoy Cruz (Argentina)	1–1	(Argentina) Independiente
Ramírez 33'	Report	Defederico 1'

Estadio Malvinas Argentinas, Mendoza
Attendance: 11,819
Referee: Héctor Baldassi (Argentina)

March 31, 2011
21:15 UTC−03:00

Peñarol (Uruguay)	2–1	(Argentina) Godoy Cruz
Olivera 42'; Freitas 70'	Report	Rodríguez 57' (o.g.)

Estadio Centenario, Montevideo
Attendance: 43,179
Referee: Heber Lopes (Brazil)
April 5, 2011
21:15 UTC−03:00

Independiente (Argentina)	1–1	(Ecuador) LDU Quito
Núñez 23' (pen.)	Report	J. Velázquez 57' (o.g.)

Estadio Libertadores de América, Avellaneda
Attendance: 13,270
Referee: Carlos Torres (Paraguay)

April 12, 2011
19:15 UTC−03:00

Peñarol (Uruguay)	0–1	(Argentina) Independiente
	Report	Parra 33'

Estadio Centenario, Montevideo
Attendance: 51,989
Referee: Antonio Arias (Paraguay)
April 12, 2011
17:15 UTC−05:00

LDU Quito (Ecuador)	2–0	(Argentina) Godoy Cruz
L. Bolaños 47'; Barcos 58'	Report

Estadio Casa Blanca, Quito
Attendance: 15,516
Referee: Paulo Oliveira (Brazil)
