= 2011 Copa Sudamericana final stages =

Continental association football tournament of South America

The final stages of the 2011 Copa Bridgestone Sudamericana de Clubes consisted of four stages:

- Round of 16 (first legs: September 28–29, October 5, 19; second legs: October 12, 19–20, 25–26)
- Quarterfinals (first legs: November 1–3; second legs: November 9–10, 17)
- Semifinals (first legs: November 23–24; second legs: November 29–30)
- Finals (first leg: December 8; second leg: December 14)

== Format ==
The defending champion, Independiente, and the fifteen winners of the second stage (three from Argentina, four from Brazil, eight from rest of South America) qualified for the final stages. The sixteen teams played a single-elimination tournament, and were seeded depending on which second stage tie they won (i.e., the winner of Match O1 would be assigned the 1 seed, etc.; Independiente were assigned the 5 seed). In each stage, teams played in two-legged ties on a home-away basis, with the higher-seeded team playing the second leg at home. Each team earned 3 points for a win, 1 point for a draw, and 0 points for a loss. The following criteria were used for breaking ties on points, except for the final:

1. Goal difference
2. Away goals
3. Penalty shootout (no extra time is played)

For the final, the first tiebreaker was goal difference. If had tied on goal difference, the away goals rule would not have been applied, and 30 minutes of extra time would have been played. If still had tied after extra time, the title would have been decided by penalty shootout.

If two teams from the same association reach the semifinals, they would be forced to play each other.

== Bracket ==
In each tie, the higher-seeded team played the second leg at home.

Round of 16
1	(Argentina) Vélez Sársfield	2	1
16	(Chile) U. Católica	0	1
8	(Colombia) Santa Fe	1	4
9	(Brazil) Botafogo	1	1
4	(Paraguay) Libertad	0	2
13	(Brazil) São Paulo	1	0
5	(Argentina) Independiente	0	1
12	(Ecuador) LDU Quito	2	0
2	U. de Chile	4	1
15	(Brazil) Flamengo	0	0
7	(Argentina) Arsenal	0	3
10	(Paraguay) Olimpia	0	2
3	(Brazil) Vasco da Gama	1	8
14	(Bolivia) Aurora	3	3
6	(Peru) Universitario (p)	1	1 (3)
11	(Argentina) Godoy Cruz	1	1 (2)

Quarterfinals
1	(Argentina) Vélez Sársfield	1	3
8	(Colombia) Santa Fe	1	2
4	(Paraguay) Libertad	0	1 (4)
12	(Ecuador) LDU Quito (p)	1	0 (5)
2	U. de Chile	2	3
7	(Argentina) Arsenal	1	0
3	(Brazil) Vasco da Gama	0	5
6	(Peru) Universitario	2	2

Semifinals
1	(Argentina) Vélez Sársfield	0	0
12	(Ecuador) LDU Quito	2	1
2	U. de Chile	1	2
3	(Brazil) Vasco da Gama	1	0

Finals
12	(Ecuador) LDU Quito	0	0
2	U. de Chile	1	3

== Round of 16 ==
Team 1 played the second leg at home.

Team 1	Agg.	Team 2	1st leg	2nd leg
Vélez Sársfield (Argentina)	3–1	(Chile) Universidad Católica	2–0	1–1
Santa Fe (Colombia)	5–2	(Brazil) Botafogo	1–1	4–1
Independiente (Argentina)	1–2	(Ecuador) LDU Quito	0–2	1–0
Libertad (Paraguay)	2–1	(Brazil) São Paulo	0–1	2–0
Universidad de Chile	5–0	(Brazil) Flamengo	4–0	1–0
Arsenal (Argentina)	3–2	(Paraguay) Olimpia	0–0	3–2
Universitario (Peru)	2–2 (3–2 p)	(Argentina) Godoy Cruz	1–1	1–1
Vasco da Gama (Brazil)	9–6	(Bolivia) Aurora	1–3	8–3

=== Round of 16 Match 1 ===
October 5, 2011
19:15 UTC−03:00

Universidad Católica (Chile)	0–2	(Argentina) Vélez Sársfield
	Report	Franco 15'; Bella 41'

Estadio San Carlos de Apoquindo, Santiago
Referee: Darío Ubriaco (Uruguay)

October 20, 2011
19:15 UTC−03:00

Vélez Sársfield (Argentina)	1–1	(Chile) Universidad Católica
Ortiz 76'	Report	Sepúlveda 29'

Estadio José Amalfitani, Buenos Aires
Referee: Antonio Arias (Paraguay)

Vélez Sársfield won on points 4–1.

=== Round of 16 Match 2 ===
September 29, 2011
21:30 UTC−03:00

Botafogo (Brazil)	1–1	(Colombia) Santa Fe
Caio 65'	Report	Pérez 8'

Estádio Olímpico João Havelange (Engenhão), Rio de Janeiro
Referee: Enrique Osses (Chile)

October 25, 2011
19:10 UTC−05:00

Santa Fe (Colombia)	4–1	(Brazil) Botafogo
Rodas 2', 62'; Pérez 8'; Léo 45' (o.g.)	Report	Alexandre Oliveira 86'

Estadio Nemesio Camacho "El Campín", Bogotá
Referee: Roberto Silvera (Uruguay)

Santa Fe won on points 4–1.

=== Round of 16 Match 3 ===
September 28, 2011
17:15 UTC−05:00

LDU Quito (Ecuador)	2–0	(Argentina) Independiente
Ambrosi 42'; L. Bolaños 52'	Report

Estadio Casa Blanca, Quito
Referee: Líber Prudente (Uruguay)

October 12, 2011
21:15 UTC−03:00

Independiente (Argentina)	1–0	(Ecuador) LDU Quito
Núñez 45'	Report

Estadio Libertadores de América, Avellaneda
Referee: José Buitrago (Colombia)

Tied on points 3–3, LDU Quito won on goal difference.

=== Round of 16 Match 4 ===
October 19, 2011
21:50 UTC−02:00

São Paulo (Brazil)	1–0	(Paraguay) Libertad
Luís Fabiano 76'	Report

Estádio Cícero Pompeu de Toledo (Morumbi), São Paulo
Attendance: 8,069
Referee: Jorge Larrionda (Uruguay)

October 26, 2011
20:50 UTC−03:00

Libertad (Paraguay)	2–0	(Brazil) São Paulo
Aquino 9' (pen.); Núñez 67'	Report

Estadio Dr. Nicolás Léoz, Asunción
Referee: Wilmar Roldán (Colombia)

Tied on points 3–3, Libertad won on goal difference.

=== Round of 16 Match 5 ===
October 19, 2011
21:50 UTC−02:00

Flamengo (Brazil)	0–4	Universidad de Chile
	Report	Felipe 13' (o.g.); E. Vargas 41', 42'; Lorenzetti 71'

Estádio Olímpico João Havelange (Engenhão), Rio de Janeiro
Referee: Saúl Laverni (Argentina)

October 26, 2011
20:50 UTC−03:00

Universidad de Chile	1–0	(Brazil) Flamengo
Díaz 22'	Report

Estadio Nacional Julio Martínez Prádanos, Santiago
Referee: Carlos Amarilla (Paraguay)

Universidad de Chile won on points 6–0.

=== Round of 16 Match 6 ===
September 29, 2011
18:15 UTC−04:00

Olimpia (Paraguay)	0–0	(Argentina) Arsenal
	Report

Estadio Defensores del Chaco, Asunción
Referee: Paulo Oliveira (Brazil)

October 19, 2011
18:10 UTC−03:00

Arsenal (Argentina)	3–2	(Paraguay) Olimpia
Trombetta 15'; Zelaya 19'; Blanco Leschuk 84'	Report	Zeballos 34', 42'

Estadio Julio Humberto Grondona, Sarandí
Referee: Darío Ubriaco (Uruguay)

Arsenal won on points 4–1.

=== Round of 16 Match 7 ===
September 29, 2011
21:30 UTC−03:00

Godoy Cruz (Argentina)	1–1	(Peru) Universitario
Cabrera 88'	Report	Ruidíaz 80'

Estadio Malvinas Argentinas, Mendoza
Referee: Antonio Arias (Paraguay)

October 20, 2011
19:45 UTC−05:00

Universitario (Peru)	1–1	(Argentina) Godoy Cruz
Polo 84'	Report	Damonte 44'
Penalties
Galván (penalty scored); Morel (penalty missed); Vitti (penalty missed); Ruidíaz (penalty scored); Rabanal (penalty scored)	3–2	(penalty scored) Caruso; (penalty scored) Curbelo; (penalty missed) Rojas; (penalty missed) Sánchez; (penalty missed) Damonte

Estadio Miguel Grau, Callao
Referee: Wilmar Roldán (Colombia)

Tied on points 2–2, Universitario won on penalties.

=== Round of 16 Match 8 ===
October 5, 2011
20:50 UTC−04:00

Aurora (Bolivia)	3–1	(Brazil) Vasco da Gama
Villalba 50'; Andaveris 57'; Reynoso 73'	Report	Bernardo 41'

Estadio Félix Capriles, Cochabamba
Referee: Georges Buckley (Peru)

October 26, 2011
19:10 UTC−02:00

Vasco da Gama (Brazil)	8–3	(Bolivia) Aurora
Bernardo 8', 76'; Alecsandro 38', 44'; Leandro 48'; Juninho Pernambucano 68' (pen.); Douglas 81'; Allan 90+2'	Report	Andaveris 16'; Peña 71' (pen.); Segovia 87'

Estádio São Januário, Rio de Janeiro
Referee: Julio Quintana (Paraguay)

Tied on points 3–3, Vasco da Gama won on goal difference.

== Quarterfinals ==
Team 1 played the second leg at home.

Team 1	Agg.	Team 2	1st leg	2nd leg
Vélez Sársfield (Argentina)	4–3	(Colombia) Santa Fe	1–1	3–2
Libertad (Paraguay)	1–1 (4–5 p)	(Ecuador) LDU Quito	0–1	1–0
Universidad de Chile	5–1	(Argentina) Arsenal	2–1	3–0
Vasco da Gama (Brazil)	5–4	(Peru) Universitario	0–2	5–2

=== Quarterfinal Match 1 ===
November 1, 2011
20:15 UTC−05:00

Santa Fe (Colombia)	1–1	(Argentina) Vélez Sársfield
Bedoya 24'	Report	D. Ramírez 76'

Estadio Nemesio Camacho "El Campín", Bogotá
Referee: Wilson Seneme (Brazil)

November 10, 2011
21:15 UTC−03:00

Vélez Sársfield (Argentina)	3–2	(Colombia) Santa Fe
Franco 7', 19'; Martínez 90' (pen.)	Report	Copete 46'; Pérez 67'

Estadio José Amalfitani, Buenos Aires
Referee: Enrique Osses (Chile)

Vélez Sársfield won on points 4–1.

=== Quarterfinal Match 2 ===
November 3, 2011
19:45 UTC−05:00

LDU Quito (Ecuador)	1–0	(Paraguay) Libertad
L. Bolaños 90'	Report

Estadio Casa Blanca, Quito
Referee: Sergio Pezzotta (Argentina)

November 17, 2011
19:15 UTC−03:00

Libertad (Paraguay)	1–0	(Ecuador) LDU Quito
Velázquez 89'	Report
Penalties
Aquino (penalty scored); Velázquez (penalty scored); Pouso (penalty scored); Canuto (penalty missed); Medina (penalty scored); Maciel (penalty missed)	4–5	(penalty scored) Bieler; (penalty scored) Urrutia; (penalty missed) D. Calderón; (penalty scored) Guagua; (penalty scored) Barcos; (penalty scored) Reasco

Estadio Dr. Nicolás Léoz, Asunción
Referee: Wilson Seneme (Brazil)

Tied on points 3–3, LDU Quito won on penalties.

=== Quarterfinal Match 3 ===
November 3, 2011
19:30 UTC−03:00

Arsenal (Argentina)	1–2	Universidad de Chile
Obolo 46'	Report	E. Vargas 45'; Canales 81' (pen.)

Estadio Julio Humberto Grondona, Sarandí
Referee: Líber Prudente (Uruguay)

November 17, 2011
21:45 UTC−03:00

Universidad de Chile	3–0	(Argentina) Arsenal
E. Vargas 10'; Castro 45+1'; Canales 55'	Report

Estadio Nacional Julio Martínez Prádanos, Santiago
Referee: Wilmar Roldán (Colombia)

Universidad de Chile won on points 6–0.

=== Quarterfinal Match 4 ===
November 2, 2011
18:50 UTC−05:00

Universitario (Peru)	2–0	(Brazil) Vasco da Gama
Ruidíaz 36' (pen.); Fano 58'	Report

Estadio Nacional, Lima
Referee: Carlos Vera (Ecuador)

November 9, 2011
21:50 UTC−02:00

Vasco da Gama (Brazil)	5–2	(Peru) Universitario
Diego Souza 23' (pen.); Élton 48'; Dedé 57', 72'; Alecsandro 81'	Report	Ruidíaz 32'; Rabanal 47'

Estádio São Januário, Rio de Janeiro
Referee: Carlos Amarilla (Paraguay)

Tied on points 3–3, Vasco da Gama won on goal difference.

== Semifinals ==
Team 1 played the second leg at home.

Team 1	Agg.	Team 2	1st leg	2nd leg
Universidad de Chile	3–1	(Brazil) Vasco da Gama	1–1	2–0
Vélez Sársfield (Argentina)	0–3	(Ecuador) LDU Quito	0–2	0–1

=== Semifinal Match 1 ===
November 23, 2011
21:50 UTC−02:00

Vasco da Gama (Brazil)	1–1	Universidad de Chile
Bernardo 32'	Report	O. González 78'

Estádio São Januário, Rio de Janeiro
Referee: Antonio Arias (Paraguay)

November 30, 2011
20:50 UTC−03:00

Universidad de Chile	2–0	(Brazil) Vasco da Gama
Canales 30'; E. Vargas 72'	Report

Estadio Santa Laura-Universidad SEK, Santiago
Referee: Darío Ubriaco (Uruguay)

Universidad de Chile won on points 4–1.

=== Semifinal Match 2 ===
November 24, 2011
19:15 UTC−05:00

LDU Quito (Ecuador)	2–0	(Argentina) Vélez Sársfield
Barcos 48', 83'	Report

Estadio Casa Blanca, Quito
Referee: Jorge Larrionda (Uruguay)

November 29, 2011
21:15 UTC−03:00

Vélez Sársfield (Argentina)	0–1	(Ecuador) LDU Quito
	Report	Barcos 48'

Estadio José Amalfitani, Buenos Aires
Referee: José Buitrago (Colombia)

LDU Quito won on points 6–0.

== Finals ==
The Finals were played over two legs, with the higher-seeded team playing the second leg at home. If the teams were tied on points and goal difference at the end of regulation in the second leg, the away goals rule would not be applied and 30 minutes of extra time would be played. If still tied after extra time, the title would be decided by penalty shootout.

December 8, 2011
19:15 UTC−05:00

LDU Quito (Ecuador)	0–1	Universidad de Chile
	Report	E. Vargas 43'

Estadio Casa Blanca, Quito
Referee: Diego Abal (Argentina)

December 14, 2011
21:15 UTC−03:00

Universidad de Chile	3–0	(Ecuador) LDU Quito
E. Vargas 2', 86'; Lorenzetti 79'	Report

Estadio Nacional Julio Martínez Prádanos, Santiago
Referee: Wilson Seneme (Brazil)

Universidad de Chile won on points 6–0.
