= List of Colombian football transfers 2015 =

This is a list of Colombian football transfers for the 2015 season. Moves featuring Categoría Primera A and Categoría Primera B clubs are listed.

== Transfers ==
Note: All players, and clubs without a flag are Colombian.

| Date | Name | Moving from | Moving to | Fee |
|---|---|---|---|---|
| 31 December 2014 | Diego Álvarez | Águilas Doradas | Real Cartagena | Undisclosed |
| 31 December 2014 | Brayan Angulo | Águilas Doradas | Independiente Medellín | Undisclosed |
| 31 December 2014 | Bréiner Belalcázar | Águilas Doradas | Deportivo Pasto | Undisclosed |
| 31 December 2014 | Camilo Ceballos | Águilas Doradas | Deportivo Pasto | Undisclosed |
| 31 December 2014 | Diego Chica | Boyacá Chicó | Águilas Doradas | Undisclosed |
| 31 December 2014 | David González Giraldo | Águilas Doradas | Independiente Medellín | Undisclosed |
| 31 December 2014 | Fredy Machado | Águilas Doradas | Deportivo Pereira | Undisclosed |
| 31 December 2014 | Ervin Maturana | Deportivo Pasto | Águilas Doradas | Undisclosed |
| 31 December 2014 | (Equatorial Guinea) Mina | Deportivo Pasto | Águilas Doradas | Undisclosed |
| 31 December 2014 | Luis Páez | Águilas Doradas | Santa Fe | Loan |
| 31 December 2014 | Dayron Pérez | Atlético Huila | Águilas Doradas | Undisclosed |
| 31 December 2014 | Óscar Rodas | Santa Fe | Águilas Doradas | Undisclosed |
| 31 December 2014 | Jhon Viáfara | Deportivo Cali | Águilas Doradas | Undisclosed |
| 31 December 2014 | Víctor Zapata | Deportivo Pasto | Águilas Doradas | Undisclosed |
| 8 January 2015 | (Argentina) Matías Giménez | Águilas Doradas | (Argentina) Argentinos Juniors | Undisclosed |
| 20 January 2015 | (Argentina) Germán Cano | Independiente Medellín | (Mexico) Pachuca | Undisclosed |
| 20 January 2014 | John Restrepo | Águilas Doradas | (Mexico) Club Celaya | Undisclosed |
| 31 January 2015 | (El Salvador) Junior Burgos | (United States) Atlanta Silverbacks | Jaguares de Córdoba | Undisclosed |
| 31 January 2015 | Javier Calle | Independiente Medellín | (United States) New York City | Loan |
| 31 January 2015 | Juan Guillermo Vélez | Águilas Doradas | (Peru) Alianza Atlético | Undisclosed |
| 9 February 2015 | Andrés Correa | Independiente Medellín | (United States) Seattle Sounders FC | Undisclosed |
| 5 March 2015 | (El Salvador) Junior Burgos | Jaguares de Córdoba | (United States) Orange County Blues | Undisclosed |
| 11 March 2015 | (England) George Saunders | Fortaleza | Patriotas | Undisclosed |
| 25 March 2015 | (Mexico) Luis Nieves | (Mexico) Club León | Independiente Medellín | Undisclosed |
| 31 May 2015 | (Panama) Nelson Barahona | (Panama) San Francisco | Alianza Petrolera | Undisclosed |
| 31 May 2015 | (Paraguay) Diego Chamorro | (Paraguay) Sportivo Luqueño | Águilas Doradas | Undisclosed |
| 31 May 2015 | José David Lloreda | Cúcuta Deportivo | Águilas Doradas | Undisclosed |
| 31 May 2015 | Juan José Mezú | Jaguares de Córdoba | Águilas Doradas | Undisclosed |
| 21 June 2015 | Fernando Uribe | Millonarios | Atlético Nacional | Undisclosed |
| 22 June 2015 | Fernando Uribe | Atlético Nacional | (Mexico) Deportivo Toluca | Undisclosed |
| 30 June 2015 | Martín Arzuaga | Jaguares de Córdoba | Alianza Petrolera | Undisclosed |
| 30 June 2015 | Gustavo Benjumea | Deportivo Pasto | Águilas Doradas | Undisclosed |
| 30 June 2015 | Esteban Castañeda | (Panama) Chorrillo | Águilas Doradas | Undisclosed |
| 30 June 2015 | Luis Chará | (Venezuela) Aragua | Águilas Doradas | Undisclosed |
| 30 June 2015 | Vladimir Marín | Independiente Medellín | Águilas Doradas | Undisclosed |
| 30 June 2015 | (Equatorial Guinea) Mina | Águilas Doradas | Boyacá Chicó | Undisclosed |
| 30 June 2015 | Luis Páez | Santa Fe | Águilas Doradas | Undisclosed |
| 30 June 2015 | Dayron Pérez | Águilas Doradas | Jaguares de Córdoba | Undisclosed |
| 30 June 2015 | Víctor Zapata | Águilas Doradas | Atlético Bucaramanga | Undisclosed |
| 7 July 2015 | Alexander Mejía | (Mexico) Monterrey | Atlético Nacional | Loan |
| 15 July 2015 | Santiago Tréllez | Atlético Nacional | (Argentina) Arsenal de Sarandí | Loan |
| 16 July 2015 | Daniel Hernández | Once Caldas | (Brazil) Atlético Paranaense | Loan |
| 15 August 2015 | (Panama) Román Torres | Millonarios | (United States) Seattle Sounders FC | Undisclosed |
| 19 June 2015 | William Arboleda | Independiente Medellín | (Mexico) Club Celaya | Undisclosed |
