= 2011 Copa Sudamericana =

10th edition of the Copa Sudamericana

2011 Copa Sudamericana de Clubes
Copa Bridgestone Sudamericana de Clubes 2011 Copa Bridgestone Sul-americana de Clubes 2011

Tournament details
- Dates: 2 August – 14 December 2011
- Teams: 39 (from 10 associations)

Final positions
- Champions: Universidad de Chile (1st title)
- Runners-up: (Ecuador) LDU Quito

Tournament statistics
- Matches played: 76
- Goals scored: 175 (2.3 per match)
- Top scorer: (Chile) Eduardo Vargas (11 goals)
- Best player: (Chile) Eduardo Vargas

The 2011 Copa Sudamericana de Clubes (officially the 2011 Copa Bridgestone Sudamericana de Clubes for sponsorship reasons) was the 10th edition of the Copa Sudamericana, South America's secondary international club football tournament organized by CONMEBOL. The winner, Universidad de Chile, qualified for the 2012 Copa Libertadores, the 2012 Recopa Sudamericana, and the 2012 Suruga Bank Championship.

== Qualified teams ==
Association	Team (Berth)	Entry stage	Qualification method
(Argentina) Argentina 6+1 berths	Independiente (Defending champion)	Round of 16	2010 Copa Sudamericana champion
(Argentina) Argentina 6+1 berths	Vélez Sársfield (Argentina 1)	Second Stage	2010–11 Primera División aggregate table 1st place
(Argentina) Argentina 6+1 berths	Estudiantes (Argentina 2)	Second Stage	2010–11 Primera División aggregate table 2nd place
(Argentina) Argentina 6+1 berths	Godoy Cruz (Argentina 3)	Second Stage	2010–11 Primera División aggregate table 3rd place
(Argentina) Argentina 6+1 berths	Lanús (Argentina 4)	Second Stage	2010–11 Primera División aggregate table 4th place
(Argentina) Argentina 6+1 berths	Arsenal (Argentina 5)	Second Stage	2010–11 Primera División aggregate table 5th place
(Argentina) Argentina 6+1 berths	Argentinos Juniors (Argentina 6)	Second Stage	2010–11 Primera División aggregate table 7th place
(Bolivia) Bolivia 3 berths	Aurora (Bolivia 1)	Second Stage	2010 Clausura 3rd place
(Bolivia) Bolivia 3 berths	The Strongest (Bolivia 2)	First Stage	2010 Apertura 4th place
(Bolivia) Bolivia 3 berths	San José (Bolivia 3)	First Stage	2010 Torneo de Invierno runner-up
(Brazil) Brazil 8 berths	Atlético Paranaense (Brazil 1)	Second Stage	2010 Série A 5th place
(Brazil) Brazil 8 berths	Botafogo (Brazil 2)	Second Stage	2010 Série A 6th place
(Brazil) Brazil 8 berths	São Paulo (Brazil 3)	Second Stage	2010 Série A 9th place
(Brazil) Brazil 8 berths	Palmeiras (Brazil 4)	Second Stage	2010 Série A 10th place
(Brazil) Brazil 8 berths	Vasco da Gama (Brazil 5)	Second Stage	2010 Série A 11th place
(Brazil) Brazil 8 berths	Ceará (Brazil 6)	Second Stage	2010 Série A 12th place
(Brazil) Brazil 8 berths	Atlético Mineiro (Brazil 7)	Second Stage	2010 Série A 13th place
(Brazil) Brazil 8 berths	Flamengo (Brazil 8)	Second Stage	2010 Série A 14th place
(Chile) Chile 3 berths	Deportes Iquique (Chile 1)	Second Stage	2010 Copa Chile champion
(Chile) Chile 3 berths	Universidad Católica (Chile 2)	First Stage	2011 Apertura classification phase 1st place
(Chile) Chile 3 berths	Universidad de Chile (Chile 3)	First Stage	2011 Primera División Copa Sudamericana playoff winner
(Colombia) Colombia 3 berths	Deportivo Cali (Colombia 1)	Second Stage	2010 Copa Colombia champion
(Colombia) Colombia 3 berths	Santa Fe (Colombia 2)	First Stage	2010 Primera A aggregate table 2nd best non-champion
(Colombia) Colombia 3 berths	La Equidad (Colombia 3)	First Stage	2010 Primera A aggregate table 3rd best non-champion
(Ecuador) Ecuador 3 berths	Emelec (Ecuador 1)	Second Stage	2011 Serie A first stage winner
(Ecuador) Ecuador 3 berths	LDU Quito (Ecuador 2)	First Stage	2010 Serie A second stage winner
(Ecuador) Ecuador 3 berths	Deportivo Quito (Ecuador 3)	First Stage	2011 Serie A first stage 3rd place
(Paraguay) Paraguay 3 berths	Libertad (Paraguay 1)	Second Stage	2010 Primera División aggregate table best champion
(Paraguay) Paraguay 3 berths	Nacional (Paraguay 2)	First Stage	2010 Primera División aggregate table 2nd best non-champion
(Paraguay) Paraguay 3 berths	Olimpia (Paraguay 3)	First Stage	2010 Primera División aggregate table 3rd best non-champion
(Peru) Peru 3 berths	Universitario (Peru 1)	Second Stage	2010 Descentralizado aggregate table 2nd best non-finalist
(Peru) Peru 3 berths	Universidad César Vallejo (Peru 2)	First Stage	2010 Descentralizado aggregate table 3rd best non-finalist
(Peru) Peru 3 berths	Juan Aurich (Peru 3)	First Stage	2010 Descentralizado aggregate table 4th best non-finalist
(Uruguay) Uruguay 3 berths	Nacional (Uruguay 1)	Second Stage	2010–11 Primera División champion
(Uruguay) Uruguay 3 berths	Fénix (Uruguay 2)	First Stage	2010–11 Primera División aggregate table 4th place
(Uruguay) Uruguay 3 berths	Bella Vista (Uruguay 3)	First Stage	2010–11 Primera División aggregate table 5th place
(Venezuela) Venezuela 3 berths	Trujillanos (Venezuela 1)	Second Stage	2010 Copa Venezuela champion
(Venezuela) Venezuela 3 berths	Deportivo Anzoátegui (Venezuela 2)	First Stage	2010–11 Primera División Serie Sudamericana winner with better aggregate
(Venezuela) Venezuela 3 berths	Yaracuyanos (Venezuela 3)	First Stage	2010–11 Primera División Serie Sudamericana winner with worse aggregate

== Draw ==
The draw was originally to be held on June 14, 2011, at CONMEBOL's Convention Center in Luque, Paraguay, but was postponed by CONMEBOL due to disruptions to air traffic in the region by the volcanic eruption of the Puyehue-Cordón Caulle volcanic complex, first to June 16, and then to June 21, and finally to June 28, with the venue switched to the Sheraton Hotel in Buenos Aires, Argentina.

The tournament was played in single-elimination format, with each tie played over two legs. The draw mechanism was as follows:

First Stage

- The sixteen teams which qualify through berths 2 and 3 from the eight countries other than Argentina and Brazil were drawn against each other. The matchups were based on countries: Bolivia v Paraguay, Chile v Uruguay, Colombia v Peru, Ecuador v Venezuela.

Second Stage

- The eight winners of the First Stage were drawn against the eight teams which qualify through berth 1 from the eight countries other than Argentina and Brazil.
- The six teams from Argentina, excluding the defending champion, were drawn against each other, where the matchups were based on the berths which the teams qualify through: 1 v 6, 2 v 5, 3 v 4, with the former playing the second leg at home.
- The eight teams from Brazil were drawn against each other, where the matchups were based on the berths which the teams qualify through: 1 v 8, 2 v 7, 3 v 6, 4 v 5, with the former playing the second leg at home.

Final stages

- The 15 winners of the Second Stage, together with the defending champion, were assigned a "seed" starting from the round of 16, which was used to determine the bracket of the final stages, with the higher-seeded team playing the second leg at home in each tie.

=== Change of sponsorship ===
During the draw, CONMEBOL announced that Bridgestone would replace Nissan Motors as the primary sponsor of the tournament. The official name of the tournament would be changed accordingly to the Copa Bridgestone Sudamericana.

== Schedule ==
All dates listed are Wednesdays, but matches may be played on the day before (Tuesdays) and after (Thursdays) as well.

Stage	First leg	Second leg
First Stage	August 3, 10, 17	August 10, 17, 24
Second Stage	August 10, 31; September 7, 14	August 24; September 7, 14, 21
Round of 16	September 28; October 5, 19	October 12, 19, 26
Quarterfinals	November 2	November 9, 16
Semifinals	November 23	November 30
Finals	December 8	December 14

== Preliminary stages ==
The first two stages of the competition are the First Stage and Second Stage. Both stages are largely played concurrent to each other.

=== First stage ===
The First Stage began on August 2 and ended on August 25. Team 1 played the second leg at home.

Team 1	Agg.	Team 2	1st leg	2nd leg
Nacional (Paraguay)	1–0	(Bolivia) San José	0–0	1–0
Santa Fe (Colombia)	3–1	(Peru) Universidad César Vallejo	1–1	2–0
Fénix (Uruguay)	0–1	Universidad de Chile	0–1	0–0
Deportivo Anzoátegui (Venezuela)	2–1	(Ecuador) Deportivo Quito	0–1	2–0
The Strongest (Bolivia)	2–3	(Paraguay) Olimpia	0–2	2–1
Juan Aurich (Peru)	1–4	(Colombia) La Equidad	0–2	1–2
Universidad Católica (Chile)	4–1	(Uruguay) Bella Vista	1–1	3–0
LDU Quito (Ecuador)	2–1	(Venezuela) Yaracuyanos	1–1	1–0

=== Second stage ===
The Second Stage began on August 10 and ended on September 22. Team 1 played the second leg at home.

Team 1	Agg.	Team 2	1st leg	2nd leg
Vélez Sársfield (Argentina)	4–0	(Argentina) Argentinos Juniors	0–0	4–0
Nacional (Uruguay)	0–3	Universidad de Chile	0–1	0–2
Palmeiras (Brazil)	3–3 (a)	(Brazil) Vasco da Gama	0–2	3–1
Libertad (Paraguay)	2–0	(Colombia) La Equidad	1–0	1–0
Universitario (Peru)	4–1	(Venezuela) Deportivo Anzoátegui	2–1	2–0
Estudiantes (Argentina)	1–2	(Argentina) Arsenal	0–2	1–0
Deportivo Cali (Colombia)	2–2 (5–6 p)	(Colombia) Santa Fe	1–1	1–1
Botafogo (Brazil)	3–1	(Brazil) Atlético Mineiro	2–1	1–0
Emelec (Ecuador)	2–4	(Paraguay) Olimpia	1–2	1–2
Godoy Cruz (Argentina)	2–2 (a)	(Argentina) Lanús	2–2	0–0
Trujillanos (Venezuela)	1–5	(Ecuador) LDU Quito	1–4	0–1
São Paulo (Brazil)	4–2	(Brazil) Ceará	1–2	3–0
Aurora (Bolivia)	6–3	(Paraguay) Nacional	1–1	5–2
Atlético Paranaense (Brazil)	0–2	(Brazil) Flamengo	0–1	0–1
Deportes Iquique (Chile)	1–2	(Chile) Universidad Católica	1–2	0–0

== Final stages ==
Teams from the Round of 16 onwards were seeded depending on which second stage tie they won (i.e., the winner of Match O1 would be assigned the 1 seed, etc.; the defending champion, Independiente, was assigned the 5 seed).

=== Bracket ===
In each tie, the higher-seeded team played the second leg at home.

Round of 16
1	(Argentina) Vélez Sársfield	2	1
16	(Chile) Universidad Católica	0	1
8	(Colombia) Santa Fe	1	4
9	(Brazil) Botafogo	1	1
4	(Paraguay) Libertad	0	2
13	(Brazil) São Paulo	1	0
5	(Argentina) Independiente	0	1
12	(Ecuador) LDU Quito	2	0
2	Universidad de Chile	4	1
15	(Brazil) Flamengo	0	0
7	(Argentina) Arsenal	0	3
10	(Paraguay) Olimpia	0	2
3	(Brazil) Vasco da Gama	1	8
14	(Bolivia) Aurora	3	3
6	(Peru) Universitario (p)	1	1 (3)
11	(Argentina) Godoy Cruz	1	1 (2)

Quarterfinals
1	(Argentina) Vélez Sársfield	1	3
8	(Colombia) Santa Fe	1	2
4	(Paraguay) Libertad	0	1 (4)
12	(Ecuador) LDU Quito (p)	1	0 (5)
2	Universidad de Chile	2	3
7	(Argentina) Arsenal	1	0
3	(Brazil) Vasco da Gama	0	5
6	(Peru) Universitario	2	2

Semifinals
1	(Argentina) Vélez Sársfield	0	0
12	(Ecuador) LDU Quito	2	1
2	Universidad de Chile	1	2
3	(Brazil) Vasco da Gama	1	0

Finals
12	(Ecuador) LDU Quito	0	0
2	Universidad de Chile	1	3

=== Round of 16 ===
The Round of 16 began on September 28 and ended on October 26. Team 1 played the second leg at home.

Team 1	Agg.	Team 2	1st leg	2nd leg
Vélez Sársfield (Argentina)	3–1	(Chile) Universidad Católica	2–0	1–1
Santa Fe (Colombia)	5–2	(Brazil) Botafogo	1–1	4–1
Independiente (Argentina)	1–2	(Ecuador) LDU Quito	0–2	1–0
Libertad (Paraguay)	2–1	(Brazil) São Paulo	0–1	2–0
Universidad de Chile	5–0	(Brazil) Flamengo	4–0	1–0
Arsenal (Argentina)	3–2	(Paraguay) Olimpia	0–0	3–2
Universitario (Peru)	2–2 (3–2 p)	(Argentina) Godoy Cruz	1–1	1–1
Vasco da Gama (Brazil)	9–6	(Bolivia) Aurora	1–3	8–3

=== Quarterfinals ===
The Quarterfinals began on November 1 and ended on November 17. Team 1 played the second leg at home.

Team 1	Agg.	Team 2	1st leg	2nd leg
Vélez Sársfield (Argentina)	4–3	(Colombia) Santa Fe	1–1	3–2
Libertad (Paraguay)	1–1 (4–5 p)	(Ecuador) LDU Quito	0–1	1–0
Universidad de Chile	5–1	(Argentina) Arsenal	2–1	3–0
Vasco da Gama (Brazil)	5–4	(Peru) Universitario	0–2	5–2

=== Semifinals ===
The Semifinals began on November 23 and ended on November 30. Team 1 played the second leg at home.

Team 1	Agg.	Team 2	1st leg	2nd leg
Universidad de Chile	3–1	(Brazil) Vasco da Gama	1–1	2–0
Vélez Sársfield (Argentina)	0–3	(Ecuador) LDU Quito	0–2	0–1

=== Finals ===
The Finals were played over two legs, with the higher-seeded team playing the second leg at home. If the teams were tied on points and goal difference at the end of regulation in the second leg, the away goals rule would not be applied and 30 minutes of extra time would be played. If still tied after extra time, the title would be decided by penalty shootout.

December 8, 2011
19:15 UTC−5

LDU Quito (Ecuador)	0–1	Universidad de Chile
	Report	E. Vargas 43'

Estadio Casa Blanca, Quito
Attendance: 41,000
Referee: Diego Abal (Argentina)

December 14, 2011
21:15 UTC−3

Universidad de Chile	3–0	(Ecuador) LDU Quito
E. Vargas 2', 86'; Lorenzetti 79'	Report

Estadio Nacional Julio Martínez Prádanos, Santiago
Attendance: 50,000
Referee: Wilson Seneme (Brazil)

Universidad de Chile won on points 6–0.

== Top goalscorers ==
Rank	Player	Team	Goals
1	(Chile) Eduardo Vargas	Universidad de Chile	11
2	(Argentina) Hernán Barcos	(Ecuador) LDU Quito	7
3	(Brazil) Bernardo	(Brazil) Vasco da Gama	4
3	(Mexico) Guillermo Franco	(Argentina) Vélez Sársfield	4
3	(Argentina) Omar Pérez	(Colombia) Santa Fe	4
3	(Colombia) Óscar Rodas	(Colombia) Santa Fe	4
3	(Peru) Raúl Ruidíaz	(Peru) Universitario	4
8	(Brazil) Alecsandro	(Brazil) Vasco da Gama	3
8	(Bolivia) Augusto Andaveris	(Bolivia) Aurora	3
8	(Ecuador) Luis Bolaños	(Ecuador) LDU Quito	3
8	(Chile) Gustavo Canales	Universidad de Chile	3
8	(Paraguay) Pablo Zeballos	(Paraguay) Olimpia	3

== See also ==
- 2011 Copa Libertadores
- 2012 Recopa Sudamericana
- 2012 Suruga Bank Championship
