= Juan Vélez (disambiguation) =

Juan Vélez (born 1983) is a Puerto Rican musician.

Juan Vélez may also refer to:

- Juan Velez (bishop elect) (1602–1661), Roman Catholic prelate
- Juan Guillermo Vélez (born 1983), Colombian footballer
- Juan Vélaz (sometimes Juan Vélez; fl. 1170s–1180s), Spanish nobleman
- Juan Vélez de Guevara (1611–1675), playwright of the Spanish Golden Age
