= Nicolas Torres =

Nicolas Torres may refer to:

- Nicolás Torres (footballer, born 1983), Argentinian footballer
- Nicolás Torres (BMX cyclist) (born 1997), Argentinian bicycle motocross cyclist
- Nicky Torres (Nicolas Torres, born 1987) Argentinian footballer

== See also ==
- Nicolas Torre, Filipino police officer
