= Sasha Mitjaew =

Chilean football manager

Personal information
- Full name: Alexander Mitjaew Panasewitsch
- Date of birth: 18 March 1946 (age 80)
- Place of birth: Soviet Union

Managerial career
- Years: Team
- 1973–1974: Unión La Calera
- 1975: San Antonio Unido
- 1976: Trasandino
- 1977: Deportes Linares
- 1978: Coquimbo Unido
- 1979: San Antonio Unido
- 1980: Rangers
- 1980: Trasandino
- 1981–1983: San Antonio Unido
- 1983: Audax Italiano
- 1984: Palestino
- 1986: Naval
- 1987: Rangers
- 1990–1991: Audax Italiano
- 1993: Deportes Concepción
- 1994: Coquimbo Unido
- 1997: Santiago Morning
- 1999: Deportes La Serena
- 2002–2003: Mariscal Braun

Alexander Mitjaew Panasewitsch (born 18 March 1946), sportingly known as Sasha Mitjaew or Sacha Mitjaew, is a Soviet-born Chilean former football manager.

== Career ==
With an extensive career in Chile, Mitjaew began his career with Unión La Calera in the 1974 Primera División de Chile, where he previously worked as fitness coach, becoming the youngest manager in the history of the Chilean top division.

In the Chilean top level, he also led Coquimbo Unido, Audax Italiano, Palestino, Naval, Rangers, Deportes Concepción and Deportes La Serena.

In the second level, he led San Antonio Unido, Trasandino, Deportes Linares, Rangers, Audax Italiano and Santiago Morning.

Abroad, he had a stint with Bolivian club Mariscal Braun in 2002–03. He recommended three players from the Bolivian football for Universidad de Chile who finally did not sign with the club: Clemilson da Silva, Jaime Cardozo and Álex da Rosa.

== Political career ==
Committed with sports, Mitjaew was a candidate to deputy for the district 18 – including cities such as Linares, Cauquenes, Parral, among others – supported by the party País in the 2017 election.

== Personal life ==
Born in Soviet Union, Mitjaew came to Chile at the age of five on board a ship. His father was Russian and his mother was Ukrainian.

According to his official ID, he was born in 1946, but he declares it was in 1948.

Mitjaew graduated as a PE teacher, got a PhD in exercise physiology in Russia and got a degree in sport psychology in Spain.
