= Carlos Elías =

Peruvian footballer (born 1988)

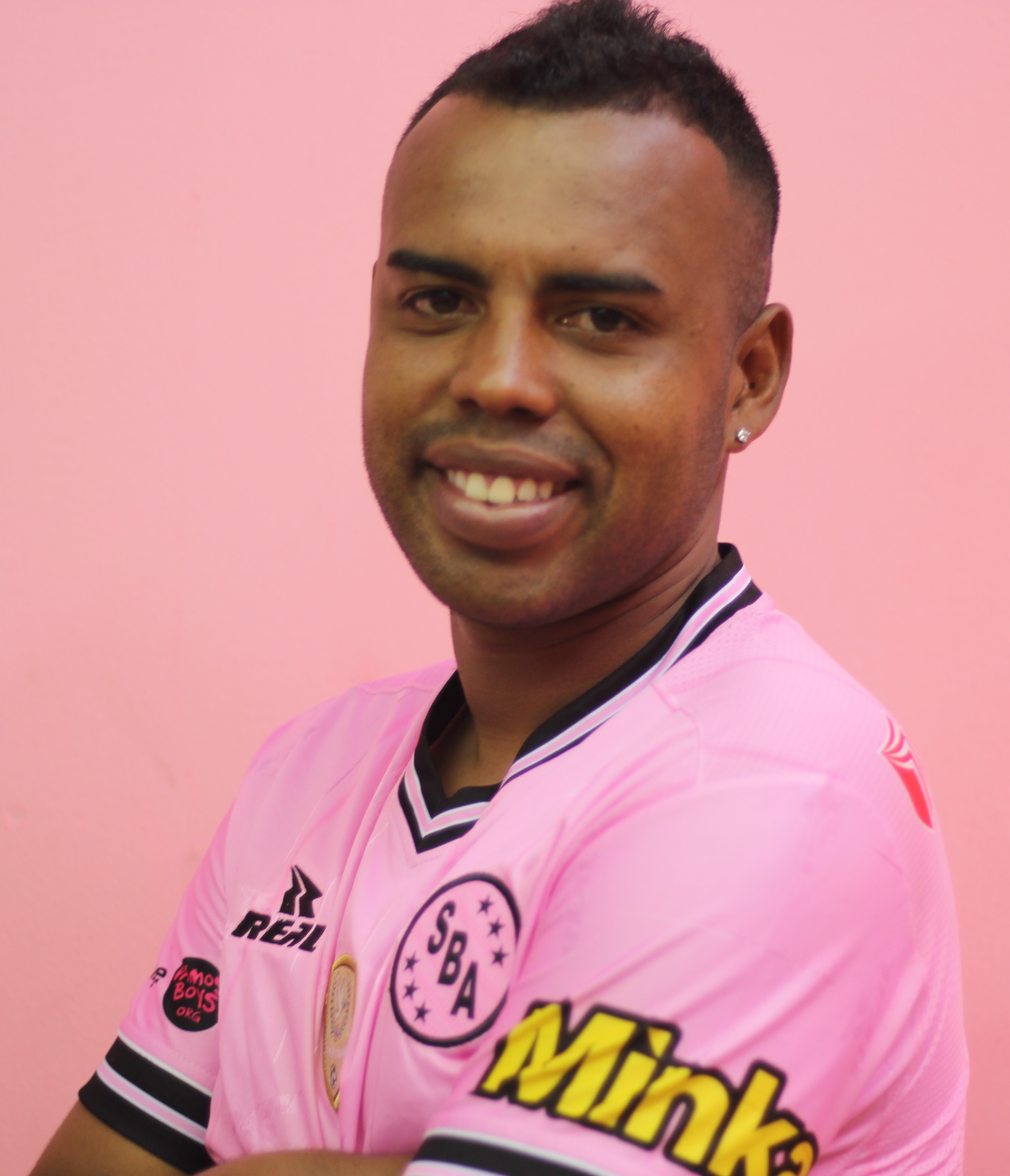

Personal information
- Full name: Carlos Roberto Elías Galliani
- Date of birth: March 23, 1988 (age 38)
- Place of birth: Callao, Peru
- Height: 1.73 m (5 ft 8 in)
- Position: Forward

Team information
- Current team: Alfonso Ugarte

Youth career
- –2006: Alianza Lima

Senior career*
Years	Team	Apps	(Gls)
2007	Alianza Lima	3	(0)
2008	Atlético Minero	13	(1)
2008	Alianza Lima	3	(0)
2009–2010	Sport Boys	41	(14)
2011	León de Huánuco	23	(3)
2012	Cienciano	22	(6)
2013–2014	Los Caimanes	16	(6)
2014	Alianza Universidad	4	(1)
2015–2016	Sport Boys	42	(13)
2017–2018	Cantolao	16	(1)
2019	Alianza Universidad	1	(0)
2020–	Alfonso Ugarte		

International career
2005	Peru U-17		
2007	Peru U-20		
- * Club domestic league appearances and goals as of 12:24, 29 September 2020 (UTC)

Carlos Roberto Elías Galliani (born March 23, 1988) is a Peruvian footballer who plays as a forward for Alfonso Ugarte de Puno.

Elías played for Peru at the 2005 FIFA U-17 World Championship in Peru.

== Career ==
In January 2020, Elías moved to Alfonso Ugarte de Puno.

== Honours ==
=== Club ===
Sport Boys:

- Peruvian Second Division: 2009
