= Quicentro Sur =

Shopping mall in Quito, Ecuador

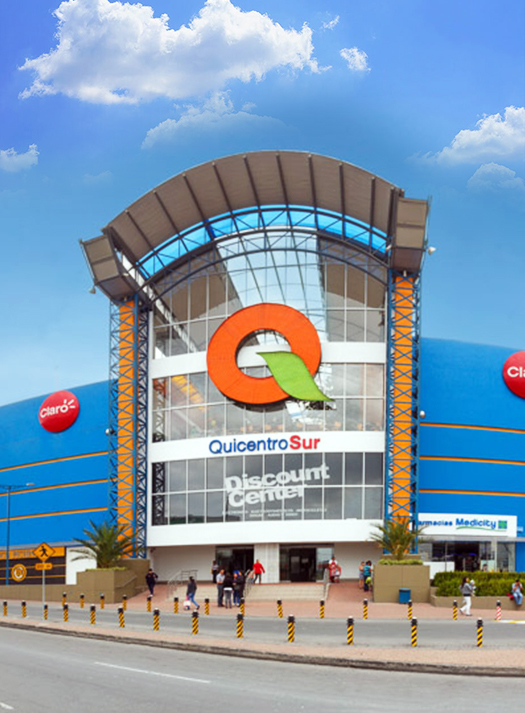
- Location: Quito, Ecuador
- Coordinates: 0.2853°S 78.5438°W
- Address: Av. Moran Valverde and Quitumbe Ñan
- Opened: August 10, 2010
- Owner: DK Management Services
- Architect: Ekron Construcciones
- Num. of stores: 350
- Num. of anchor tenants: 12 (Megamaxi, Juguetón, Supercines, De Prati, EtaFashion, Bebemundo, RM, Super Exito, Pycca, Marathon, Super Paco, Fybeca)
- Floor area: 2,400,402 sq ft (223,004.6 m^{2})
- Floors: 3
- Parking: 2000
- Website: quicentrosur.com

Quicentro Sur is a shopping mall located south of Quito that opened in August 2010. It is the largest mall in Ecuador. It contains 350 shops, an entertainment area, a food court, ten cinema screens, a large plaza for events, and an ice rink in a construction area of 165,000 square metres (1,780,000 sq ft) over a total area of ten hectares (25 acres).
