= Gustavo Benjumea =

Colombian footballer (born 1996)

Personal information
- Full name: Gustavo Adolfo Benjumea Jaramillo
- Date of birth: 12 January 1996 (age 30)
- Place of birth: Cali, Colombia
- Height: 1.85 m (6 ft 1 in)
- Position: Defender

Team information
- Current team: Flamurtari
- Number: 29

Youth career
- 2011–2013: Deportes Quindío
- 2014: Atlético Huila
- 2014: América-MG

Senior career*
Years	Team	Apps	(Gls)
2015	Deportivo Pasto	2	(0)
2016	Rionegro Águilas	0	(0)
2017	Boyacá Chicó	0	(0)
2017–2018	1º Dezembro	23	(1)
2018	Montijo		
2018–2020	1º Dezembro	44	(4)
2021	Bogotá	10	(0)
2021–2022	Tigres	41	(2)
2023–2024	Orsomarso	15	(2)
2023	→ Tauro (loan)	13	(1)
2024–	Flamurtari	9	(0)
- * Club domestic league appearances and goals as of 4 May 2024

Gustavo Adolfo Benjumea Jaramillo (born 12 January 1996) is a Colombian footballer who plays as a defender for Albanian club Flamurtari.

== Career statistics ==
=== Club ===
As of 6 March 2023.

Appearances and goals by club, season and competition
Club	Season	League			Cup		Other		Total	
Club	Season	Division	Apps	Goals	Apps	Goals	Apps	Goals	Apps	Goals
Deportivo Pasto	2015	Categoría Primera A	2	0	1 (Note: Appearances in the Copa Colombia)	0	0	0	3	0
Rionegro Águilas	2016	Categoría Primera A	0	0	0	0	0	0	0	0
Boyacá Chicó	2017	Categoría Primera B	0	0	0	0	0	0	0	0
1º Dezembro	2017–18	Campeonato de Portugal	23	1	1 (Note: Appearances in the Taça de Portugal)	0	0	0	24	1
1º Dezembro	2018–19	Campeonato de Portugal	19	2	0	0	0	0	19	2
1º Dezembro	2019–20	Campeonato de Portugal	24	2	0	0	0	0	24	2
1º Dezembro	2020–21	Campeonato de Portugal	1	0	0	0	0	0	1	0
1º Dezembro	Total		67	5	1	0	0	0	68	5
Bogotá	2021	Categoría Primera B	10	0	0	0	0	0	10	0
Tigres	2021	Categoría Primera B	11	0	0	0	0	0	11	0
Tigres	2022	Categoría Primera B	30	2	7	0	0	0	37	2
Tigres	Total		41	2	7	0	0	0	48	2
Orsomarso	2023	Categoría Primera B	4	2	1	0	0	0	5	2
Career total			124	9	10	0	0	0	134	9
