= Fernando Giménez =

Paraguayan footballer (born 1984)

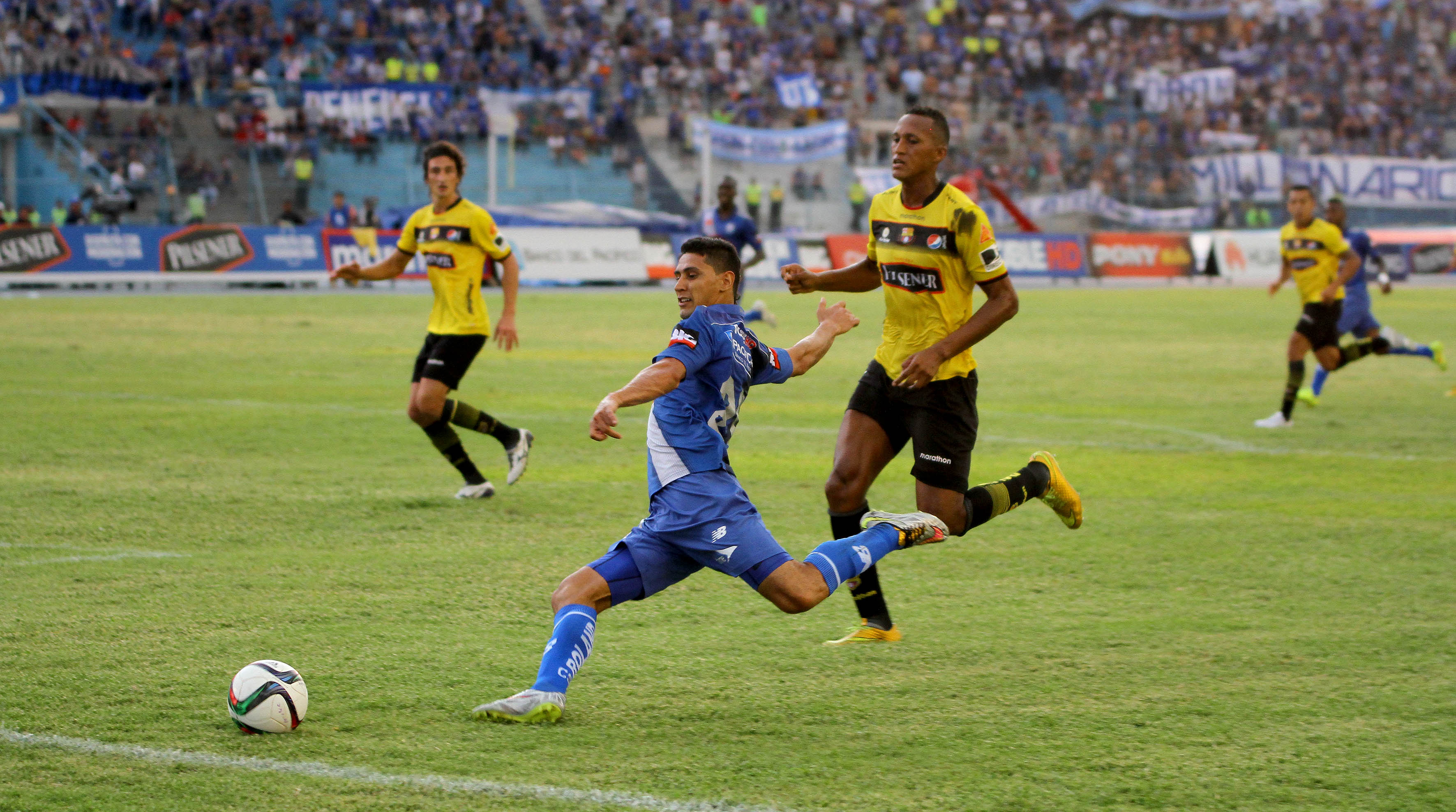
- Giménez with Emelec in 2015

Personal information
- Full name: Fernando Augusto Giménez Solís
- Date of birth: 10 July 1984 (age 42)
- Place of birth: Coronel Oviedo, Paraguay
- Height: 1.76 m (5 ft 9 in)
- Position: Attacking midfielder

Senior career*
Years	Team	Apps	(Gls)
2005–2006	Nacional Asunción	13	(1)
2006	Deportes Puerto Montt	18	(7)
2007–2009	Universidad de Concepción	74	(6)
2007	→ Deportes Puerto Montt (loan)	14	(6)
2010–2016	Emelec	246	(28)
2017	Olimpia	21	(0)
2018	Libertad	5	(0)
2019	Deportivo Santaní	9	(0)
Total		400	(48)

International career
2012	Paraguay	1	(0)
- * Club domestic league appearances and goals

Fernando Agustín Giménez Solís (born 10 July 1984) is a former Paraguayan footballer who played as an attacking midfielder.

== Club career ==
At age nineteen, Giménez joined the Primera División side Nacional Asunción in 2005, and made his professional debut the same season. He spent one season with the Asunción club before moving to Puerto Montt of the Chilean Primera División for an undisclosed fee. In January 2007, he signed a two-season contract with Universidad de Concepción club of the same tier of his old club, which kept him until 2009 at Collao. In his first cycle with his new club, he stayed only six months, because the coach Marcelo Barticciotto did not consider him for the next tournament due to his performance. He was then loaned back to Puerto Montt. Giménez again shone there, being the goal scorer of his team, but it was relegated to Primera B. He returned to Concepción the next season, where he won the 2008 Copa Chile title under coach Jorge Pellicer and recovered his good level of play.

In January 2010, he joined Ecuadorian Serie A powerhouse club Emelec, because the coach Jorge Sampaoli specially requested him. He arrived for a one-season loan with a buy option. He made his debut in the match in which Emelec present their players, an event called Explosión Azul, and scored a goal against Independiente José Terán in a 2–0 home win. As a result of his play on Guayaquil's team, coach Fernando Arce called Giménez to the Paraguay national football team.

After playing for Emelec, Giménez returned to his homeland and played for Olimpia, Libertad and Deportivo Santaní, ending his career in 2019.

== International career ==
Whilst playing at club level in Ecuador for several years, Ecuador's coach, Gustavo Quinteros, requested Giménez's naturalization to play for Ecuador in 2016.

== Honours ==
Universidad de Concepción

- Copa Chile (1): 2008

Emelec

- Ecuadorian Serie A (2): Runner-up 2010, 2011
