= Edwin Chalar =

Colombian football striker (born 1987)

Personal information
- Full name: Edwin Mauricio Chalar Granja
- Date of birth: April 21, 1987 (age 39)
- Place of birth: Tuluá, Colombia
- Height: 1.83 m (6 ft 0 in)
- Position: Striker

Team information
- Current team: Deportivo Lara
- Number: 9

Senior career*
| Years | Team | Apps | (Gls) |
| 2004 | Atlético Huila | 8 | (1) |
| 2005 | Deportivo Quevedo | 16 | (12) |
| 2006 | Manta | 4 | (0) |
| 2006 | Envigado | 5 | (0) |
| 2007 | Newell's Old Boys | 13 | (2) |
| 2007 | Atlético Bucaramanga | 0 | (0) |
| 2008 | Macará | 13 | (2) |
| 2008–2009 | Cucuta Deportivo | 12 | (2) |
| 2009– | Deportivo Lara | 30 | (13) |
| | Yaracuyanos | 7 | (6) |

International career
| 2007 | Colombia U-20 | 7 | (1) |
- * Club domestic league appearances and goals as of 16:06, 21 February 2010 (UTC)

Edwin Mauricio Chalar Granja (born 21 April 1987) is a Colombian football striker who plays for Cienciano in Peru.

He has played for the Colombian U-20 national football team (2007). On club level he plays for Atlético Bucaramanga in the Copa Mustang.

After the Sudamericana sub 20 2007 in Paraguay where he was a starter for the Colombian sub 20. He was transferred to Newell's Old Boys where he appeared in only four league matches before returning to Colombia to play for Atlético Bucaramanga.
