= Nicky Torres =

Argentine footballer

Personal information
- Full name: Nicolas Torres
- Date of birth: June 1, 1987 (age 39)
- Place of birth: Miami, Florida, United States
- Height: 5 ft 11 in (1.80 m)
- Position: Midfielder

Youth career
- Deportivo Español

Senior career*
| Years | Team | Apps | (Gls) |
| 2009 | Miami FC | 10 | (0) |
| 2010– | Jorge Wilstermann | 5 | (1) |

International career
| 2006 | United States U-20 | 3 | (1) |
- * Club domestic league appearances and goals as of 22 October 2009

Nicolas "Nicky" Torres (born June 1, 1987, in Miami, Florida) is an Argentine footballer.

== Career ==
=== Club ===
Torres began his career playing in Argentina with the youth academy of Deportivo Español. Debuted at age 18 in Deportivo Español and played several games as a starter and coming on as a substitute.

In June 2008, Torres signed with Argentino de Merlo of the Argentine Primera C Metropolitana.

He returned to the United States in 2008. He signed with Miami FC of the USL First Division on April 13, 2009. He made his professional debut on April 26, 2009, coming on as a substitute in Miami's game against Rochester Rhinos.

In 2010, he signed with Bolivian club Jorge Wilstermann.

=== International ===
Torres played with United States U-20 team pool in 2006.
