= Jaime Cardozo =

Bolivian footballer (born 1982)

Personal information
- Full name: Jaime Cardozo Tahua
- Date of birth: March 14, 1982 (age 44)
- Place of birth: Beni, Bolivia
- Height: 1.67 m (5 ft 6 in)
- Position: Midfielder

Senior career*
Years	Team	Apps	(Gls)
2000–2001	Independiente Petrolero		
2002	Mariscal Braun	34	(1)
2003	Independiente Petrolero	29	(2)
2004	Iberoamericana	19	(4)
2005–2008	The Strongest	97	(18)
2009–2011	Aurora	106	(11)
2012–2013	Jorge Wilstermann	15	(0)
2013–2014	Nacional Potosí	29	(1)

International career^{‡}
2007–2008	Bolivia	3	(0)
- * Club domestic league appearances and goals as of December 2008 ‡ National team caps and goals as of December 1, 2009

Jaime Cardozo Tahua (born March 14, 1982, in Beni) is a Bolivian retired footballer.

== Club career ==
He played for Aurora, The Strongest, Jorge Wilstermann and Nacional Potosí in the Bolivian league.

== International career ==
Cardozo earned 3 caps for Bolivia and represented his country in 1 FIFA World Cup qualification match.
