= Bréiner Belalcázar =

Colombian footballer (born 1984)

Personal information
- Full name: Bréiner Stiven Belalcázar Ulabarry
- Date of birth: 23 September 1984 (age 42)
- Place of birth: Palmira, Valle del Cauca, Colombia
- Height: 1.70 m (5 ft 7 in)
- Position: Midfielder

Youth career
- Deportivo Cali

Senior career*
Years	Team	Apps	(Gls)
2005–2008	Deportivo Cali	67	(1)
2006	→ Deportes Quindío (loan)	9	(0)
2007	→ La Equidad (loan)	25	(2)
2009–2010	Atlético Huila	57	(1)
2011	Deportivo Cali	24	(2)
2012	Junior de Barranquilla	16	(0)
2013	Deportes Tolima	4	(0)
2013	Alianza Petrolera	5	(0)
2014	Rionegro Águilas	18	(0)
2015–2016	Deportivo Pasto	28	(0)
2016–2017	Deportivo Pereira	8	(0)
- * Club domestic league appearances and goals

Bréiner Stiven Belalcázar Ulabarry (Note: In this Spanish name, the first or paternal surname is Belalcázar and the second or maternal family name is Ulabarry.) (born 23 September 1984), known as Bréiner Belalcázar, is a Colombian retired footballer.

== Club career ==
Belalcázar previously played for Deportivo Cali and has spent time on loan at Deportes Quindío, La Equidad, and Atlético Huila.

In January 2011, he returned to Deportivo Cali.
