= Juan Guillermo Vélez =

Colombian footballer (born 1983)

Juan Guillermo Vélez Córdoba (born September 16, 1983, in Medellín, Colombia) is a Colombian former professional footballer who played as a forward.

== Teams ==
- (Colombia) Millonarios 2004–2006
- (Colombia) Leones 2006
- (Colombia) Atlético Bello 2006–2007
- (Venezuela) Estrella Roja 2007–2008
- (Venezuela) Aragua 2008
- (Venezuela) Trujullanos 2008–2010
- (Venezuela) Zamora 2010–2011
- (Colombia) Santa Fe 2011–2012
- (Colombia) Deportivo Pasto (loan) 2013–2014
- (Peru) Alianza Atlético 2015–2019
- (El Salvador) C.D. Luis Ángel Firpo 2019
