= Marlon Escalante =

Venezuelan football referee

- Born: 19 February 1974 (age 52); San Cristóbal, Venenzuela
- Other occupation: Engineer

Domestic
Years	League	Role
2010–2019	Venezuelan Primera División	Referee

International
Years	League	Role
2011–2014	CONMEBOL	Referee
2011–2013	FIFA	Referee

Marlon Escalante (born February 19, 1974) is a Venezuelan football referee. He has been a FIFA international referee since 2009.

== See also ==
- Football in Venezuela
