= Georges Buckley =

Peruvian international referee

- Full name: Georges Buckley
- Born: 23 April 1974 (age 52); Peru

Domestic
Years	League	Role

International
Years	League	Role
2006–	FIFA listed	Referee

Georges Buckley (born 23 April 1974) is a Peruvian international referee.

Buckley became a FIFA referee in 2006. He has refereed at 2014 FIFA World Cup qualifiers, beginning with the match between Venezuela and Bolivia.
