= Luis Bolaños =

Ecuadorian footballer (born 1985)

Personal information
- Full name: Luis Alberto Bolaños León
- Date of birth: 27 March 1985 (age 41)
- Place of birth: Quito, Ecuador
- Height: 1.76 m (5 ft 9 in)
- Positions: Winger; forward

Team information
- Current team: S.D. Quito
- Number: 7

Youth career
- 2000–2005: L.D.U. Quito

Senior career*
Years	Team	Apps	(Gls)
2002–2008	L.D.U. Quito	85	(13)
2005–2006	→ Macará (loan)	56	(9)
2009	Santos	0	(0)
2009–2011	Internacional	13	(3)
2010	→ Barcelona SC (loan)	35	(7)
2011–2016	L.D.U. Quito	87	(14)
2012	→ Atlas (loan)	10	(0)
2013	→ San Martín SJ (loan)	12	(0)
2014	→ Chivas USA (loan)	3	(0)
2015	→ Deportivo Cuenca (loan)	32	(9)
2017	Fuerza Amarilla	14	(1)
2018–2021	Olmedo	35	(9)
2022–	S.D. Quito	0	(0)

International career
2007–2008	Ecuador	12	(0)
- * Club domestic league appearances and goals as of October 20, 2018

Luis Alberto Chucho Bolaños León (born March 27, 1985) is an Ecuadorian professional football midfielder who plays for S.D. Quito.

== Club career ==
Chucho as he is nicknamed has only received international recognition in recent years, during his performance in the 2008 Copa Libertadores with his former team LDU Quito. He was part of the starting line-up for LDU Quito that won the 2008 Copa Libertadores and has since won legend status in Ecuador's capital.

Bolaños made a great performance in the 2008 FIFA Club World Cup. He scored on a beautiful free kick against Pachuca in Liga's 2–0 victory in the semi-finals. Liga lost the final to Manchester United 1–0.

On January 8, "El Chucho" signed for Santos in Brazil for the 2009 season. However, he failed to make any impact and after only four months at the club, decided to terminate his contract.

He signed for Internacional on 11 May 2009. He scored a hat trick for Internacional in one of his debut against Coritiba.

On December 21, Bolaños signed for Barcelona in Ecuador for a one-year loan for the 2010 season.

On his debut day on February 13, Bolaños scored his first goal with Barcelona from a 30 meters distance shot.

== International career ==
He has been called up several times by Ecuador for the 2010 World Cup Qualifiers. He has made good performances with Ecuador, mainly against Argentina and Colombia. He was called once again to play against Chile and Venezuela.

== Assault ==
On February 25, 2011, Bolaños was attacked by two unknown assailants in an attempted robbery outside Quicentro, a shopping mall in northern Quito. During the attack, Bolaños was shot once in his right shoulder and once in his right arm. He was hospitalized and out of any serious danger.

== Honours ==
LDU Quito

- Serie A: 2003, 2007
- Copa Libertadores: 2008

Internacional

- Suruga Bank Championship: 2009
