= Wilson Seneme =

Brazilian football referee (born 1970)

Wilson Luiz Seneme (born 28 August 1970, in São Carlos) is a Brazilian football referee.

He became a FIFA referee in 2006. He was appointed in four games in 2011 FIFA U-20 World Cup. He managed the match between Paraguay and Uruguay in the start of 2014 FIFA World Cup - CONMEBOL qualifiers.

Before becoming a referee, Seneme played in the youth teams of Guarani FC, being called up to the 1986 South American U-16 Championship.
