= Darío Ubriaco =

Uruguayan football referee

Darío Agustín Ubríaco Medero (born 8 February 1972) is a football referee from Uruguay.
