= Hernando Buitrago =

Colombian football referee

- Full name: José Hernando Buitrago Arango
- Born: 5 November 1970 (age 55); Líbano, Tolima, Colombia

Domestic
Years	League	Role

International
Years	League	Role
2006–	FIFA listed	Referee

José Hernando Buitrago Arango (born 5 November 1970) is a Colombian football referee.

Buitrago became a FIFA referee in 2006. He refereed at the 2010 and 2014 FIFA World Cup qualifiers. He has also served as a referee in international junior-level competitions, including the 2007 FIFA U-20 World Cup, the 2007 FIFA U-17 World Cup, and the 2011 FIFA U-20 World Cup.
