= Paulo César de Oliveira =

Brazilian football referee

- Full name: Paulo César de Oliveira
- Born: 16 December 1973 (age 52); Cruzeiro, São Paulo, Brazil
- Other occupation: Full-time referee

Domestic
Years	League	Role
1997-2014	Campeonato Brasileiro Série A	Referee

International
Years	League	Role
1999-2014	FIFA listed	Referee

Paulo César de Oliveira (born 16 December 1973 in Cruzeiro) is a former Brazilian football referee.

== Refereeing career ==
Paulo César de Oliveira took the refereeing course at the Federação Paulista de Futebol, and represented the State of São Paulo in the Brazilian football competitions.

Paulo César received his FIFA badge in 1999 and was ranked the number one referee by the Confederação Brasileira de Futebol in 2007. He was also a CONMEBOL Elite Category referee.

In 2014, he retired of his refereeing career and became a pundit for Brazilian TV channel Rede Globo.

== Statistics ==
=== Série A ===
Year	Games	Total (yellow card)	(yellow card) per game	Total (red card)	(red card) per game
1997	13	82	6.30	15	1.15
1998	15	66	4.40	9	0.60
1999	7	31	4.42	5	0.71
2000	19	104	5.47	10	0.52
2001	16	73	4.56	7	0.43
2002	19	107	5.63	10	0.52
2003	24	130	5.41	15	0.62
2004	25	134	5.36	12	0.48
2005	10	42	4.20	2	0.20
2006	13	68	5.23	5	0.38
2007	20	84	4.20	7	0.35
2008	16	75	4.68	8	0.50
2009	17	99	5.82	9	0.52
2010	17	101	5.94	7	0.41
Overall	231	1196	5.17	121	0.52
