= 2011 in Paraguayan football =

The 2011 season is the 101st season of competitive football in Paraguay.

== Transfers ==
- List of transfers during the 2011 season registered under the Asociación Paraguaya de Fútbol.

== National teams ==
The home team or the team that is designated as the home team is listed in the left column; the away team is in the right column.

Win Draw Loss

=== Senior ===
==== Friendly matches ====
March 26, 2011	Mexico	3 – 1	Paraguay	Oakland, United States
14:00 UTC−07	Hernández 40' (pen.), 83' (pen.); Guardado 28'	(Report)	Riveros 86'	Stadium: Oakland Coliseum; Attendance: 48,110; Referee: Paul Ward (Canada)

March 29, 2011	United States	0 – 1	Paraguay	Nashville, United States
19:00 UTC−05		(Report)	Cardozo 18'	Stadium: LP Field; Attendance: 29,059; Referee: José Benigno (Honduras)

May 25, 2011 Copa Chaco	Argentina	4 – 2	Paraguay	Resistencia, Argentina
16:00 UTC−03	Hauche 9', 44'; Fernández 36'; Pérez 73'	(Report)	Zeballos 13'; Marecos 55'	Stadium: Estadio Centenario; Attendance: 25,000; Referee: Roberto Silvera (Uruguay)

June 4, 2011 Copa Paz del Chaco	Bolivia	0 – 2	Paraguay	Santa Cruz, Bolivia
20:30 UTC−04		(Report)	Barrios 34'; Santander 73'	Stadium: Estadio Ramón Tahuichi Aguilera; Attendance: 30,000; Referee: Manuel Garay (Peru)

June 7, 2011 Copa Paz del Chaco	Paraguay	0 – 0	Bolivia	Luque, Paraguay
18:30 UTC−04		(Report)		Stadium: Estadio Feliciano Cáceres; Attendance: 20,000; Referee: Heber Roberto Lopes (Brazil)

June 11, 2011	Paraguay	2 – 0	Romania	Asunción, Paraguay
18:00 UTC−04	Valdez 2'; Santa Cruz 28'	(Report)		Stadium: Estadio Defensores del Chaco

June 23, 2011	Paraguay	0 – 0	Chile	Asunción, Paraguay
19:00 UTC−04		(Report)		Stadium: Estadio Defensores del Chaco; Attendance: 12,000; Referee: Paulo César de Oliveira (Brazil)

September 2, 2011	Panama	0 – 2	Paraguay	Panama City, Panama
21:05 UTC−5		(Report)	Cardozo 7' (pen.); Ramírez 11'	Stadium: Estadio Rommel Fernández

September 6, 2011	Honduras	0 – 3	Paraguay	San Pedro Sula, Honduras
19:30 UTC−6		(Report)	Camacho 31'; Cardozo 87', 90+3'	Stadium: Estadio Francisco Morazán

December 21, 2011	Chile	3 – 2	Paraguay	La Serena, Chile
22:00 UTC−3	S. Pinto 19', 62', 74'	Report	É. Benítez 52'; J. Dos Santos 56'	Stadium: Estadio La Portada; Attendance: 9,000; Referee: Raúl Orosco (Bolivia)

==== 2011 Copa América ====
July 3, 2011 Group B	Paraguay	0 – 0	Ecuador	Santa Fe, Argentina
18:30 UTC−03		(Report)		Stadium: Estadio Brigadier General Estanislao López; Attendance: 12,000; Referee: Sergio Pezzotta (Argentina)

July 9, 2011 Group B	Brazil	2 – 2	Paraguay	Córdoba, Argentina
16:00 UTC−03	Jádson 38'; Fred 89'	(Report)	Santa Cruz 54'; Valdez 66'	Stadium: Estadio Mario Alberto Kempes; Referee: Wilmar Roldán (Colombia)

July 13, 2011 Group B	Paraguay	3 – 3	Venezuela	Salta, Argentina
19:15 UTC−03	Alcaraz 33'; Barrios 62'; Riveros 85'	(Report)	Rondón 5'; Miku 89'; Perozo 90+2'	Stadium: Estadio Padre Ernesto Martearena; Referee: Enrique Osses (Chile)

July 17, 2011 Quarterfinals	Brazil	0 – 0 (a.e.t.) (0 – 2 p)	Paraguay	La Plata, Argentina
16:00 UTC−03		(Report)		Stadium: Estadio Ciudad de La Plata; Referee: Sergio Pezzotta (Argentina)
	Penalties
	Elano (penalty missed); Silva (penalty missed); Santos (penalty missed); Fred (penalty missed)		Barreto (penalty missed); Estigarribia (penalty scored); Riveros (penalty scored)

July 20, 2011 Semifinals	Paraguay	0 – 0 (a.e.t.) (5 – 3 p)	Venezuela	Mendoza, Argentina
21:45 UTC−03		(Report)		Stadium: Estadio Malvinas Argentinas; Referee: Francisco Chacón (Mexico)
	Penalties
	Origoza (penalty scored); Barrios (penalty scored); Riveros (penalty scored); Martínez (penalty scored); Verón (penalty scored)		Maldonado (penalty scored); Rey (penalty scored); Lucena (penalty missed); Miku (penalty scored)

July 24, 2011 Final	Uruguay	3 – 0	Paraguay	Buenos Aires, Argentina
16:00 UTC−03	Suárez 11'; Forlán 41', 89'	(Report)		Stadium: Estadio Monumental Antonio Vespucio Liberti; Referee: Sálvio Fagundes (Brazil)

==== 2014 FIFA World Cup qualification ====
October 7 World Cup qualifying	Peru	2–0	Paraguay	Lima, Peru
20:15 UTC−5	Guerrero 46', 71'	Report		Stadium: Estadio Nacional; Attendance: 39,600; Referee: Sergio Pezzotta (Argentina)

October 11 World Cup qualifying	Paraguay	1–1	Uruguay	Asunción, Paraguay
19:45 UTC−3	Ortiz 90+2'	Report	Forlán 68'	Stadium: Estadio Defensores del Chaco; Attendance: 12,922; Referee: Wilson Seneme (Brazil)

November 11 World Cup qualifying	Paraguay	2 – 1	Ecuador	Asunción, Paraguay

November 15 World Cup qualifying	Chile	2 – 0	Paraguay	Santiago, Chile

=== Under-20 ===
==== 2011 South American Youth Championship ====
January 17, 2011 Group B	Brazil U-20	4 – 2	Paraguay U-20	Tacna, Peru
21:10 UTC−05	Neymar 25' (pen.), 33', 60', 63'	(Report)	Viera 51'; Montenegro 84'	Stadium: Estadio Jorge Basadre; Referee: Diego Abal (Argentina)

January 20, 2011 Group B	Bolivia U-20	0 – 1	Paraguay U-20	Tacna, Peru
19:00 UTC−05		(Report)	Torres 23'	Stadium: Estadio Jorge Basadre; Referee: Marlon Escalante (Venezuela)

January 23, 2011 Group B	Ecuador U-20	1 – 0	Paraguay U-20	Moquegua, Peru
13:40 UTC−05	Montaño 60'	(Report)		Stadium: Estadio 25 de Noviembre; Referee: Dario Ubriaco (Uruguay)

January 28, 2011 Group B	Colombia U-20	3 – 3	Paraguay U-20	Tacna, Peru
21:10 UTC−05	Cardona 39', 87'; Ortega 68'	(Report)	Correa 32'; Ruiz 37', 57'	Stadium: Estadio Jorge Basadre; Referee: Jorge Osorio (Peru)

=== Under-17 ===
==== 2011 South American Under-17 Football Championship ====
March 16, 2011 Group B	Colombia U-17	3 – 1	Paraguay U-17	Ibarra, Ecuador
16:00 UTC−05	Delgado 12'; Palomeque 78'; Osorio 90+1'	(Report)	González 55'	Stadium: Estadio Olímpico; Referee: Héctor Martínez (Uruguay)

March 19, 2011 Group B	Brazil U-17	1 – 2	Paraguay U-17	Ibarra, Ecuador
20:10 UTC−05	Piazon 31'	(Report)	Giménez 77'; Caballero 81'	Stadium: Estadio Olímpico; Referee: Diego Lara (Ecuador)

March 22, 2011 Group B	Paraguay U-17	3 – 0	(Chile) Paraguay U-17	Ibarra, Ecuador
16:00 UTC−05	Caballero 26', 80'; Báez 53'	(Report)		Stadium: Estadio Olímpico; Referee: Néstor Pitana (Argentina)

March 25, 2011 Group B	Paraguay U-17	3 – 1	Venezuela U-17	Ibarra, Ecuador
19:00 UTC−05	Palacios 16'; Florenciáñez 42', 61'	(Report)	Castillo 47'	Stadium: Estadio Olímpico; Referee: José Jordán (Bolivia)

March 28, 2011 Final stage	Argentina U-17	1 – 0	Paraguay U-17	Latacunga, Ecuador
15:50 UTC−05	Benítez 75'	(Report)		Stadium: Estadio La Cocha; Referee: Héctor Parra (Colombia)

March 31, 2011 Final stage	Ecuador U-17	2 – 2	Paraguay U-17	Quito, Ecuador
18:00 UTC−05	Batioja 27'; Uchuari 83'	(Report)	Ovelar 77'; Caballero 85'	Stadium: Estadio Olímpico Atahualpa; Referee: Néstor Pitana (Argentina)

April 3, 2011 Final stage	Paraguay U-17	1 – 3	Uruguay U-17	Latacunga, Ecuador
15:50 UTC−05	Caballero 78'	(Report)	Aguirre 22'; Álvarez 59'; Mascia 75'	Stadium: Estadio La Cocha; Referee: Patricio Polic (Chile)

April 6, 2011 Final stage	Brazil U-17	3 – 1	Paraguay U-17	Quito, Ecuador
20:10 UTC−05	Guilherme 15'; Claudio Wink 56'; Piazon 86'	(Report)	Mareco 31'	Stadium: Estadio Olímpico Atahualpa; Referee: Henry Gambetta (Peru)

April 9, 2011 Final stage	Paraguay U-17	1 – 2	Colombia U-17	Quito, Ecuador
15:50 UTC−05	Benítez 90'	(Report)	Cuero 12', 29'	Stadium: Estadio de Liga Deportiva Universitaria; Referee: Diego Lara (Ecuador)

== League tables ==
=== Primera División ===
==== Aggregate table ====
Pos	Team	Pld	W	D	L	GF	GA	GD	Pts	Qualification or relegation
1	Olimpia	44	26	10	8	82	44	+38	88	2012 Copa Libertadores Second Stage and 2012 Copa Sudamericana First Stage (Note: Olimpia and Nacional are qualified for the second stage of the 2012 Copa Libertadores as the Clausura and Apertura champions respectively. Olimpia are also qualified for the first stage of the 2012 Copa Sudamericana as the champion with the better aggregate record.)
2	Nacional	44	25	8	11	68	45	+23	83	2012 Copa Libertadores Second Stage
3	Libertad	44	22	13	9	64	37	+27	79	2012 Copa Libertadores First Stage
4	Cerro Porteño	44	17	16	11	64	51	+13	67	2012 Copa Sudamericana First Stage
5	Tacuary	44	13	21	10	48	42	+6	60	2012 Copa Sudamericana First Stage
6	Guaraní	44	15	13	16	55	56	−1	58	2012 Copa Sudamericana First Stage
7	Rubio Ñu	44	15	13	16	60	63	−3	58	
8	Independiente	44	11	19	14	53	53	0	52	
9	Sol de América	44	12	13	19	48	63	−15	49	
10	3 de Febrero	44	9	14	21	52	72	−20	41	
11	General Caballero	44	11	8	25	50	85	−35	41	
12	Sportivo Luqueño	44	7	14	23	42	75	−33	35	

Updated to match(es) played on 18 December 2011. Source:
Rules for classification: 1st points. If two teams are tied on points, a playoff game will be held to break the tie. If more than two clubs are tied on points, the following will be used as a tiebreaker: 1st goal difference; 2nd goals scored; 3rd away-goals scored; 4th draw of lots

==== Relegation ====
Relegations is determined at the end of the season by computing an average (Spanish: promedio) of the number of points earned per game over the past three seasons. The two teams with the lowest average is relegated to the División Intermedia for the following season.

Pos	Team	'09 Pts	'10 Pts	'11 Pts	Total Pts	Total Pld	Avg	Relegation
1	Libertad	82	87	79	248	132	1.8788	
2	Cerro Porteño	81	91	67	239	132	1.8106	
3	Nacional	77	77	83	237	132	1.7955	
4	Olimpia	70	71	88	229	132	1.7348	
5	Guaraní	67	85	58	210	132	1.5909	
6	Rubio Ñú	63	66	58	187	132	1.4167	
7	Tacuary	64	37	60	161	132	1.2197	
8	Independiente	0	0	52	52	44	1.1818	
9	Sol de América	50	45	49	144	132	1.0909	
10	Sportivo Luqueño	51	42	35	128	132	0.9697	
11	General Caballero	0	0	41	41	44	0.9318	Relegated to the División Intermedia
12	3 de Febrero	43	38	41	122	132	0.9242	Relegated to the División Intermedia

=== Segunda División ===
==== Standings ====
Pos	Team	Pld	W	D	L	GF	GA	GD	Pts	Promotion or relegation
1	Cerro Porteño PF	26	13	6	7	43	28	+15	45	Promoted to 2012 Paraguayan Primera División season
2	Sportivo Carapeguá	26	13	6	7	41	29	+12	45	Promoted to 2012 Paraguayan Primera División season
3	Deportivo Capiatá	26	12	8	6	39	26	+13	44	
4	Deportivo Santaní	26	11	11	4	28	22	+6	44	
5	River Plate	26	9	10	7	32	36	−4	37	
6	General Díaz	26	9	9	8	30	28	+2	36	
7	Atlético Colegiales	26	7	12	7	23	28	−5	33	
8	San Lorenzo	26	7	11	8	36	37	−1	32	
9	Fernando de la Mora	26	7	10	9	28	29	−1	31	
10	Sportivo Iteño	26	6	11	9	22	24	−2	29	
11	Sportivo Trinidense	26	7	8	11	22	31	−9	29	
12	Sport Colombia	26	6	10	10	21	26	−5	28	
13	Deportivo Caaguazú	26	5	9	12	29	37	−8	24	Relegated
14	12 de Octubre	26	3	13	10	24	37	−13	22	Relegated

== Paraguayan clubs in international competitions ==
Club	Competition	Final round
Cerro Porteño	2011 Copa Libertadores	Semifinals
Guaraní	2011 Copa Libertadores	Second Stage
Libertad	2011 Copa Libertadores	Round of 16
Libertad	2011 Copa Sudamericana	Quarterfinals
Nacional	2011 Copa Sudamericana	Second Stage
Olimpia	2011 Copa Sudamericana	Round of 16

=== Cerro Porteño ===
January 27, 2011 Copa Libertadores First Stage	Cerro Porteño (Paraguay)	1 – 0	(Venezuela) Deportivo Petare	Asunción, Paraguay
20:00 UTC−03	Nanni 70'	(Report)		Stadium: Estadio General Pablo Rojas; Attendance: 15,663; Referee: Paulo César Oliveira (Brazil)

February 3, 2011 Copa Libertadores First Stage	Deportivo Petare (Venezuela)	1 – 1	(Paraguay) Cerro Porteño	Caracas, Venezuela
21:00 UTC−04:30	Guazá 13'	(Report)	Nanni 34'	Stadium: Estadio Olímpico; Attendance: 2,897; Referee: Carlos Vera (Ecuador)

February 17, 2011 Copa Libertadores Second Stage	Cerro Porteño (Paraguay)	5 – 2	(Chile) Colo-Colo	Asunción, Paraguay
20:00 UTC−03	Nanni 1', 68' (pen.); Dos Santos 6'; Iturbe 46', 85'	(Report)	Jorquera 12'; Paredes 73'	Stadium: Estadio General Pablo Rojas; Attendance: 14,597; Referee: Heber Lopes (Brazil)

March 2, 2011 Copa Libertadores Second Stage	Santos (Brazil)	1 – 1	(Paraguay) Cerro Porteño	Santos, Brazil
21:50 UTC−03	Elano 54' (pen.)	(Report)	Nanni 90+1' (pen.)	Stadium: Estádio Vila Belmiro; Attendance: 6,735; Referee: Héctor Baldassi (Argentina)

March 10, 2011 Copa Libertadores Second Stage	Cerro Porteño (Paraguay)	1 – 1	(Venezuela) Deportivo Táchira	Asunción, Paraguay
19:15 UTC−03	Nanni 27'	(Report)	Herrera 61'	Stadium: Estadio General Pablo Rojas; Attendance: 15,499; Referee: Darío Ubriaco (Uruguay)

April 6, 2011 Copa Libertadores Second Stage	Deportivo Táchira (Venezuela)	0 – 2	(Paraguay) Cerro Porteño	San Cristóbal, Venezuela
18:00 UTC−04:30		(Report)	Nanni 20'; Torres 65'	Stadium: Estadio Polideportivo de Pueblo Nuevo; Attendance: 3,587; Referee: Sergio Pezzota (Argentina)

April 14, 2011 Copa Libertadores Second Stage	Cerro Porteño (Paraguay)	1 – 2	(Brazil) Santos	Asunción, Paraguay
19:30 UTC−04	Benítez 90+3'	(Report)	Danilo 11'; Maikon Leite 47'	Stadium: Estadio General Pablo Rojas; Attendance: 12,940; Referee: Martín Vázquez (Uruguay)

April 20, 2011 Copa Libertadores Second Stage	Colo-Colo (Chile)	2 – 3	(Paraguay) Cerro Porteño	Santiago, Chile
19:30 UTC−03	Jorquera 4'; Paredes 20'	(Report)	Fabbro 42', 87'; Piris 47'	Stadium: Estadio Monumental David Arellano; Attendance: 19,816; Referee: Jorge Larrionda (Uruguay)

April 27, 2011 Copa Libertadores Round of 16	Estudiantes (Argentina)	0 – 0	(Paraguay) Cerro Porteño	La Plata, Argentina
19:30 UTC−03		(Report)		Stadium: Estadio Ciudad de La Plata; Attendance: 15,815; Referee: Sálvio Fagundes (Brazil)

May 5, 2011 Copa Libertadores Round of 16	Cerro Porteño (Paraguay)	0 – 0 (5 – 3 p)	(Argentina) Estudiantes	Asunción, Paraguay
19:15 UTC−04		(Report)		Stadium: Estadio General Pablo Rojas; Attendance: 20,408; Referee: Óscar Ruiz (Colombia)
	Penalties
	Dos Santos (penalty scored); Fabbro (penalty scored); Nanni (penalty scored); Cáceres (penalty scored); Villarreal (penalty scored)		L. Benítez (penalty scored); López (penalty scored); Pereyra (penalty scored); Roncaglia (penalty missed)

May 12, 2011 Copa Libertadores Quarterfinals	Jaguares (Mexico)	1 – 1	(Paraguay) Cerro Porteño	Tuxtla Gutiérrez, Mexico
20:45 UTC−05	Pedroza 90'	(Report)	Fabbro 72'	Stadium: Estadio Víctor Manuel Reyna; Attendance: 14,022; Referee: Sergio Pezzota (Argentina)

May 19, 2011 Copa Libertadores Quarterfinals	Cerro Porteño (Paraguay)	1 – 0	(Mexico) Jaguares	Asunción, Paraguay
21:30 UTC−04	Benítez 72'	(Report)		Stadium: Estadio General Pablo Rojas; Attendance: 24,178; Referee: Darío Ubriaco (Uruguay)

May 25, 2011 Copa Libertadores Semifinals	Santos (Brazil)	1 – 0	(Paraguay) Cerro Porteño	São Paulo, Brazil
21:50 UTC−03	Dracena 43'	(Report)		Stadium: Estádio do Pacaembu; Attendance: 31,434; Referee: Jorge Larrionda (Uruguay)

June 1, 2011 Copa Libertadores Semifinals	Cerro Porteño (Paraguay)	3 – 3	(Brazil) Santos	Asunción, Paraguay
20:50 UTC−04	C. Benítez 31'; Lucero 60'; Fabbro 81'	(Report)	Zé Eduardo 2'; Barreto 28' (o.g.); Neymar 45+1'	Stadium: Estadio General Pablo Rojas; Referee: Wilmar Roldán (Colombia)

=== Club Guaraní ===
February 15, 2011 Copa Libertadores Second Stage	Deportes Tolima (Colombia)	1 – 0	(Paraguay) Guaraní	Ibagué, Colombia
17:30 UTC−05	Santoya 83'	(Report)		Stadium: Estadio Manuel Murillo Toro; Attendance: 8,021; Referee: Omar Ponce (Ecuador)

February 22, 2011 Copa Libertadores Second Stage	Cruzeiro (Brazil)	4 – 0	(Paraguay) Guaraní	Sete Lagoas, Brazil
19:15 UTC−03	Wallyson 1', 82'; Farías 85'; Thiago 88'	(Report)		Stadium: Arena do Jacaré; Attendance: 12,067; Referee: Raúl Orozco (Bolivia)

March 9, 2011 Copa Libertadores Second Stage	Guaraní (Paraguay)	1 – 2	(Argentina) Estudiantes	Asunción, Paraguay
21:45 UTC−03	Caballero 43' (pen.)	(Report)	Barrientos 50'; L. González 53'	Stadium: Estadio Defensores del Chaco; Attendance: 1,078; Referee: Víctor Carrillo (Peru)

March 17, 2011 Copa Libertadores Second Stage	Estudiantes (Argentina)	5 – 1	(Paraguay) Guaraní	La Plata, Argentina
19:15 UTC−03	López 1', 18', 58'; L. González 24', 81'	(Report)	Benítez 79'	Stadium: Estadio Ciudad de La Plata; Attendance: 13,318; Referee: Martín Vázquez (Uruguay)

March 30, 2011 Copa Libertadores Second Stage	Guaraní (Paraguay)	0 – 2	(Brazil) Cruzeiro	Asunción, Paraguay
21:50 UTC−03		(Report)	Ribeiro 15'; Ortigoza 90+2'	Stadium: Estadio Defensores del Chaco; Attendance: 119; Referee: Enrique Osses (Chile)

April 13, 2011 Copa Libertadores Second Stage	Guaraní (Paraguay)	0 – 2	(Colombia) Deportes Tolima	Asunción, Paraguay
20:50 UTC−04		(Report)	Santoy 48'; Closa 68'	Stadium: Estadio Defensores del Chaco; Attendance: 200; Referee: Joaquín Antequera (Bolivia)

=== Club Libertad ===
February 15, 2011 Copa Libertadores Second Stage	San Luis (Mexico)	1 – 2	(Paraguay) Libertad	San Luis Potosí, Mexico
18:45 UTC−06	Cavallo 38'	(Report)	Pavlovich 18'; Aquino 54' (pen.)	Stadium: Estadio Alfonso Lastras; Attendance: 12,198; Referee: José Buitrago (Colombia)

February 22, 2011 Copa Libertadores Second Stage	Once Caldas (Colombia)	1 – 1	(Paraguay) Libertad	Manizales, Colombia
21:45 UTC−05	Moreno 28'	(Report)	Ayala (90+$)	Stadium: Estadio Palogrande; Attendance: 6,226; Referee: Saúl Laverni (Argentina)

March 8, 2011 Copa Libertadores Second Stage	Libertad (Paraguay)	5 – 1	(Peru) Universidad San Martín	Asunción, Paraguay
19:15 UTC−03	Rojas 14'; Orue 18'; Maciel 28'; Ayala 50'; Pouso 84'	(Report)	Alemanno 4'	Stadium: Estadio Dr. Nicolás Léoz; Attendance: 2,317; Referee: Roberto Silvera (Uruguay)

March 15, 2011 Copa Libertadores Second Stage	Universidad San Martín (Peru)	0 – 1	(Paraguay) Libertad	Callao, Peru
17:15 UTC−05		(Report)	Aquino 23' (pen.)	Stadium: Estadio Miguel Grau; Attendance: 1,414; Referee: Heber Lopes (Brazil)

March 22, 2011 Copa Libertadores Second Stage	Libertad (Paraguay)	2 – 2	(Colombia) Once Caldas	Asunción, Paraguay
21:15 UTC−03	Pavlovich 15', 90+2'	(Report)	Rentería 11', 17'	Stadium: Estadio Dr. Nicolás Léoz; Attendance: 1,240; Referee: Líber Prudente (Uruguay)

April 19, 2011 Copa Libertadores Second Stage	Libertad (Paraguay)	2 – 0	(Mexico) San Luis	Asunción, Paraguay
21:30 UTC−04	González 10'; Pavlovich 18'	(Report)	Rentería 11', 17'	Stadium: Estadio Dr. Nicolás Léoz; Attendance: 474; Referee: Sálvio Fagundes (Brazil)

April 28, 2011 Copa Libertadores Round of 16	Fluminense (Brazil)	3 – 1	(Paraguay) Libertad	Rio de Janeiro, Brazil
22:55 UTC−03	Moura 3'; Marquinho 71'; Conca 74'	(Report)	Gamarra 59'	Stadium: Estádio Olímpico João Havelange; Attendance: 25,378; Referee: Sergio Pezzota (Argentina)

May 4, 2011 Copa Libertadores Round of 16	Libertad (Paraguay)	3 – 0	(Brazil) Fluminense	Asunción, Paraguay
20:50 UTC−04	Rojas 57'; Samudio 85'; Núñez 90'	(Report)		Stadium: Estadio Dr. Nicolás Léoz; Attendance: 2,699; Referee: Roberto Silvera (Uruguay)

May 12, 2011 Copa Libertadores Quarterfinals	Vélez Sársfield (Argentina)	3 – 0	(Paraguay) Libertad	Buenos Aires, Argentina
20:15 UTC−03	Moralez 20'; Martínez 75' (pen.), 80'	(Report)		Stadium: Estadio Alberto J. Armando; Attendance: 9,086; Referee: Wilson Seneme (Brazil)

May 12, 2011 Copa Libertadores Quarterfinals	Libertad (Paraguay)	2 – 4	(Argentina) Vélez Sársfield	Asunción, Paraguay
20:15 UTC−03	Rojas 44'; Maciel 50'	(Report)	Moralez 44', 66'; Franco 86' (pen.); Fernández 87'	Stadium: Estadio Dr. Nicolás Léoz; Attendance: 2,000; Referee: Sálvio Fagundes (Brazil)

September 13, 2011 Copa Sudamericana Second stage	La Equidad (Colombia)	0 – 1	(Paraguay) Libertad	Bogotá, Colombia
21:30 UTC−05		(Report)	Ramírez 77'	Stadium: Estadio El Campín; Referee: Carlos Vera (Ecuador)

September 21, 2011 Copa Sudamericana Second stage	Libertad (Paraguay)	1 – 0	(Colombia) La Equidad	Asunción, Paraguay
20:45 UTC−04		(Report)		Stadium: Estadio Dr. Nicolás Léoz

=== Club Nacional ===
August 4, 2011 Copa Sudamericana First stage	San José (Bolivia)	0 – 0	(Paraguay) Nacional	Oruro, Bolivia
18:00 UTC−04		(Report)		Stadium: Estadio Jesús Bermúdez; Referee: Omar Ponce (Ecuador)

August 17, 2011 Copa Sudamericana First stage	Nacional (Paraguay)	1 – 0	(Bolivia) San José	Asunción, Paraguay
21:00 UTC−04	Torales 4'	(Report)		Stadium: Estadio Defensores del Chaco; Referee: Patricio Polic (Chile)

August 30, 2011 Copa Sudamericana Second stage	Nacional (Paraguay)	1 – 1	(Bolivia) Aurora	Asunción, Paraguay
18:00 UTC−04	González 67'	(Report)	Villalba 5'	Stadium: Estadio Defensores del Chaco; Referee: Darío Ubriaco (Uruguay)

September 20, 2011 Copa Sudamericana Second stage	Aurora (Bolivia)	5 – 2	(Paraguay) Nacional	Cochabamba, Bolivia
18:15 UTC−04		(Report)		Stadium: Estadio Félix Capriles

=== Club Olimpia ===
August 3, 2011 Copa Sudamericana First stage	Olimpia (Paraguay)	2 – 0	(Bolivia) The Strongest	Asunción, Paraguay
20:15 UTC−04	Cáceres 66'; Romero 79'	(Report)		Stadium: Estadio Defensores del Chaco; Referee: Martín Vázquez (Uruguay)

August 11, 2011 Copa Sudamericana First stage	The Strongest (Bolivia)	2 – 1	(Paraguay) Olimpia	La Paz, Bolivia
18:30 UTC−04	Chumacero 30'; Escobar 48'	(Report)	Romero 56'	Stadium: Estadio Rafael Mendoza Castellón; Referee: Víctor Rivera (Peru)

September 15, 2011 Copa Sudamericana Second stage	Olimpia (Paraguay)	2 – 1	(Ecuador) Emelec	Asunción, Paraguay
19:15 UTC−04		(Report)		Stadium: Estadio Manuel Ferreira

September 20, 2011 Copa Sudamericana Second stage	Emelec (Ecuador)	1 – 2	(Paraguay) Olimpia	Guayaquil, Ecuador
19:45 UTC−04		(Report)		Stadium: Estadio George Capwell
