= 2011 Copa Libertadores knockout stage =

The knockout stages of the 2011 Copa Santander Libertadores de América consisted of four stages:

- Round of 16 (first legs: April 26–28; second legs: May 3–5)
- Quarterfinals (first legs: May 11–12; second legs: May 18–19)
- Semifinals (first legs: May 25–26; second legs: June 1–2)
- Finals (first leg: June 15; second leg: June 22)

== Format ==
The group winners and runners-up of the second stage qualified for the knockout stages. The sixteen teams played a single-elimination tournament. In each stage, teams played in two-legged ties on a home-away basis, with the higher-seeded team playing the second leg at home. Each team earned 3 points for a win, 1 point for a draw, and 0 points for a loss. The following criteria were used for breaking ties on points, except for the final:

1. Goal difference
2. Away goals
3. Penalty shootout (no extra time is played)

For the final, the first tiebreaker was goal difference. If tied on goal difference, the away goals rule would not be applied, and 30 minutes of extra time would be played. If still tied after extra time, the title would be decided by penalty shootout.

If two teams from the same association reach the semifinals, they would be forced to play each other.

== Qualified teams ==
Group	Winners	Runners-up
1	(Paraguay) Libertad	(Colombia) Once Caldas
2	(Colombia) Junior	(Brazil) Grêmio
3	(Mexico) América	(Brazil) Fluminense
4	(Chile) Universidad Católica	(Argentina) Vélez Sársfield
5	(Paraguay) Cerro Porteño	(Brazil) Santos
6	(Brazil) Internacional	(Mexico) Chiapas
7	(Brazil) Cruzeiro	(Argentina) Estudiantes
8	(Ecuador) LDU Quito	(Uruguay) Peñarol

== Seeding ==
The 16 qualified teams were seeded in the knockout stages according to their results in the second stage, with the group winners seeded 1–8, and the group runners-up seeded 9–16. The teams were ranked by:

1. Higher position in group
2. Higher number of points (Pts);
3. Better goal difference (GD);
4. Higher number of goals scored (GF);
5. Higher number of away goals scored (AG);
6. Drawing of lots.

Teams qualified as a group winner
Seed	Team	Pts	GD	GF	AG
1	(Brazil) Cruzeiro	16	+19	20	5
2	(Paraguay) Libertad	14	+8	13	4
3	(Brazil) Internacional	13	+11	14	5
4	(Colombia) Junior	13	+2	9	4
5	(Paraguay) Cerro Porteño	11	+5	13	6
6	(Chile) Universidad Católica	11	+2	11	8
7	(Ecuador) LDU Quito	10	+8	12	2
8	(Mexico) América	10	+1	8	3

Teams qualified as a group runner-up
Seed	Team	Pts	GD	GF	AG
9	(Brazil) Santos	11	+3	11	4
10	(Argentina) Vélez Sársfield	10	+5	12	4
11	(Brazil) Grêmio	10	+3	9	2
12	(Argentina) Estudiantes	10	−2	9	3
13	(Mexico) Chiapas	9	−2	6	1
14	(Uruguay) Peñarol	9	−5	6	3
15	(Brazil) Fluminense	8	0	9	4
16	(Colombia) Once Caldas	7	−1	7	5

== Bracket ==
In each tie, the higher-seeded team played the second leg at home.

Round of 16
1	(Brazil) Cruzeiro	2	0
16	(Colombia) Once Caldas	1	2
8	(Mexico) América	0	0
9	(Brazil) Santos	1	0
4	(Colombia) Junior	1	3
13	(Mexico) Chiapas (a)	1	3
5	(Paraguay) Cerro Porteño (p)	0	0 (5)
12	(Argentina) Estudiantes	0	0 (3)
2	(Paraguay) Libertad	1	3
15	(Brazil) Fluminense	3	0
7	(Ecuador) LDU Quito	0	0
10	(Argentina) Vélez Sársfield	3	2
3	(Brazil) Internacional	1	1
14	(Uruguay) Peñarol	1	2
6	(Chile) U. Católica	2	1
11	(Brazil) Grêmio	1	0

Quarterfinals
16	(Colombia) Once Caldas	0	1
9	(Brazil) Santos	1	1
13	(Mexico) Chiapas	1	0
5	(Paraguay) Cerro Porteño	1	1
2	(Paraguay) Libertad	0	2
10	(Argentina) Vélez Sársfield	3	4
14	(Uruguay) Peñarol	2	1
6	(Chile) U. Católica	0	2

Semifinals
9	(Brazil) Santos	1	3
5	(Paraguay) Cerro Porteño	0	3
10	(Argentina) Vélez Sársfield	0	2
14	(Uruguay) Peñarol (a)	1	1

Finals
9	(Brazil) Santos	0	2
14	(Uruguay) Peñarol	0	1

== Round of 16 ==
Team 1 played the second leg at home.

Teams			Scores		Tie-breakers		
Team 1	Points	Team 2	1st leg	2nd leg	GD	AG	Pen.
Cruzeiro (Brazil)	3:3	(Colombia) Once Caldas	2–1	0–2	−1:+1	—	—
Libertad (Paraguay)	3:3	(Brazil) Fluminense	1–3	3–0	+1:−1	—	—
Internacional (Brazil)	1:4	(Uruguay) Peñarol	1–1	1–2	—	—	—
Junior (Colombia)	2:2	(Mexico) Chiapas	1–1	3–3	0:0	1:3	—
Cerro Porteño (Paraguay)	2:2	(Argentina) Estudiantes	0–0	0–0	0:0	0:0	5–3
Universidad Católica (Chile)	6:0	(Brazil) Grêmio	2–1	1–0	—	—	—
LDU Quito (Ecuador)	0:6	(Argentina) Vélez Sársfield	0–3	0–2	—	—	—
América (Mexico)	1:4	(Brazil) Santos	0–1	0–0	—	—	—

=== Match A ===
April 27, 2011
19:50 UTC−05:00

Once Caldas (Colombia)	1–2	(Brazil) Cruzeiro
Nuñez 88'	Report	Wallyson 72'; Ortigoza 83'

Estadio Palogrande, Manizales
Attendance: 13,286
Referee: Víctor Hugo Carrillo (Peru)

May 4, 2011
21:50 UTC−03:00

Cruzeiro (Brazil)	0–2	(Colombia) Once Caldas
	Report	Amaya 66'; Moreno 71'

Estádio Joaquim Henrique Nogueira (Arena do Jacaré), Sete Lagoas
Attendance: 14,972
Referee: Antonio Arias (Paraguay)

Tied on points 3–3, Once Caldas won on goal difference.

=== Match B ===
April 28, 2011
22:55 UTC−03:00

Fluminense (Brazil)	3–1	(Paraguay) Libertad
Rafael Moura 3'; Marquinho 71'; Conca 74'	Report	Gamarra 59'

Estádio Olímpico João Havelange (Engenhão), Rio de Janeiro
Attendance: 25,378
Referee: Sergio Pezzotta (Argentina)

Note: The original kickoff time was 21:50, but the match was delayed due to floodlight failure.

May 4, 2011
20:50 UTC−04:00

Libertad (Paraguay)	3–0	(Brazil) Fluminense
Rojas 57'; Samudio 85'; Núñez 90'	Report

Estadio Defensores del Chaco, Asunción
Attendance: 2,699
Referee: Roberto Silvera (Uruguay)

Tied on points 3–3, Libertad won on goal difference.

=== Match C ===
April 28, 2011
19:30 UTC−03:00

Peñarol (Uruguay)	1–1	(Brazil) Internacional
Corujo 36'	Report	Leandro Damião 64'

Estadio Centenario, Montevideo
Attendance: 43,472
Referee: Carlos Torres (Paraguay)

May 4, 2011
19:30 UTC−03:00

Internacional (Brazil)	1–2	(Uruguay) Peñarol
Oscar 1'	Report	Martinuccio 46'; Olivera 50'

Estádio José Pinheiro Borda (Beira-Rio), Porto Alegre
Attendance: 42,863
Referee: Enrique Osses (Chile)

Peñarol won on points 4–1.

=== Match D ===
April 27, 2011
17:30 UTC−05:00

Chiapas (Mexico)	1–1	(Colombia) Junior
Martínez 57'	Report	Páez 6'

Estadio Víctor Manuel Reyna, Tuxtla Gutiérrez
Attendance: 5,071
Referee: Omar Ponce (Ecuador)

May 5, 2011
20:45 UTC−05:00

Junior (Colombia)	3–3	(Mexico) Chiapas
Valencia 35'; Páez 50' (pen.); Bacca 72'	Report	Martínez 39', 63'; Andrade 86'

Estadio Metropolitano Roberto Meléndez, Barranquilla
Attendance: 17,371
Referee: Heber Lopes (Brazil)

Tied on points 2–2, Jaguares won on away goals.

=== Match E ===
April 27, 2011
19:30 UTC−03:00

Estudiantes (Argentina)	0–0	(Paraguay) Cerro Porteño
	Report

Estadio Ciudad de La Plata, La Plata
Attendance: 15,815
Referee: Salvio Fagundes (Brazil)

May 5, 2011
19:15 UTC−04:00

Cerro Porteño (Paraguay)	0–0	(Argentina) Estudiantes
	Report
Penalties
dos Santos (penalty scored); Fabbro (penalty scored); Nanni (penalty scored); Cáceres (penalty scored); Villarreal (penalty scored)	5–3	(penalty scored) L. Benítez; (penalty scored) López; (penalty scored) Pereyra; (penalty missed) Roncaglia

Estadio General Pablo Rojas, Asunción
Attendance: 20,408
Referee: Óscar Ruiz (Colombia)

Tied on points 2–2, Cerro Porteño won on penalties.

=== Match F ===
April 26, 2011
19:30 UTC−03:00

Grêmio (Brazil)	1–2	(Chile) Universidad Católica
Douglas 58'	Report	Pratto 28', 73'

Estádio Olímpico Monumental, Porto Alegre
Attendance: 31,559
Referee: Néstor Pitana (Argentina)

May 4, 2011
21:50 UTC−03:00

Universidad Católica (Chile)	1–0	(Brazil) Grêmio
Mirosevic 85'	Report

Estadio San Carlos de Apoquindo, Santiago
Attendance: 13,502
Referee: Carlos Amarilla (Paraguay)

Universidad Católica won on points 6–0.

=== Match G ===
April 26, 2011
21:50 UTC−03:00

Vélez Sársfield (Argentina)	3–0	(Ecuador) LDU Quito
Fernández 7', 10'; Domínguez 54'	Report

Estadio José Amalfitani, Buenos Aires
Attendance: 7,134
Referee: Carlos Amarilla (Paraguay)

May 5, 2011
20:45 UTC−05:00

LDU Quito (Ecuador)	0–2	(Argentina) Vélez Sársfield
	Report	Álvarez 45+10'; Bella 80'

Estadio Casa Blanca, Quito
Attendance: 19,158
Referee: Wilmar Roldán (Colombia)

Vélez Sársfield won on points 6–0.

=== Match H ===
April 27, 2011
21:50 UTC−03:00

Santos (Brazil)	1–0	(Mexico) América
Ganso 38'	Report

Estádio Urbano Caldeira (Vila Belmiro), Santos
Attendance: 11,417
Referee: Jorge Larrionda (Uruguay)

May 3, 2011
20:45 UTC−05:00

América (Mexico)	0–0	(Brazil) Santos
	Report

Estadio Corregidora, Querétaro
Attendance: 32,673
Referee: Carlos Vera (Ecuador)

Santos won on points 4–1.

== Quarterfinals ==
Team 1 played the second leg at home.

Teams			Scores		Tie-breakers		
Team 1	Points	Team 2	1st leg	2nd leg	GD	AG	Pen.
Santos (Brazil)	4:1	(Colombia) Once Caldas	1–0	1–1	—	—	—
Libertad (Paraguay)	0:6	(Argentina) Vélez Sársfield	0–3	2–4	—	—	—
Universidad Católica (Chile)	3:3	(Uruguay) Peñarol	0–2	2–1	−1:+1	—	—
Cerro Porteño (Paraguay)	4:1	(Mexico) Chiapas	1–1	1–0	—	—	—

=== Match S1 ===
May 11, 2011
19:50 UTC−05:00

Once Caldas (Colombia)	0–1	(Brazil) Santos
	Report	Alan Patrick 42'

Estadio Palogrande, Manizales
Attendance: 23,984
Referee: Juan Soto (Venezuela)

May 18, 2011
22:00 UTC−03:00

Santos (Brazil)	1–1	(Colombia) Once Caldas
Neymar 11'	Report	Renteria 29'

Estádio Municipal Paulo Machado de Carvalho (Pacaembú), São Paulo
Attendance: 35,135
Referee: Enrique Osses (Chile)

Santos won on points 4–1.

=== Match S2 ===
May 12, 2011
20:15 UTC−03:00

Vélez Sársfield (Argentina)	3–0	(Paraguay) Libertad
Moralez 20'; Martínez 75' (pen.), 80'	Report

Estadio Alberto J. Armando, Buenos Aires
Attendance: 9,086
Referee: Wilson Seneme (Brazil)

Note: The match was moved from Estadio José Amalfitani as the home stadium of Vélez Sársfield was closed after fans fired volleys of flares during their Clausura match against Banfield.

May 18, 2011
18:30 UTC−04:00

Libertad (Paraguay)	2–4	(Argentina) Vélez Sársfield
Rojas 44'; Maciel 50'	Report	Moralez 44', 66'; Franco 86' (pen.); Fernández 87'

Estadio Defensores del Chaco, Asunción
Attendance: 2,300
Referee: Salvio Fagundes (Brazil)

Vélez Sársfield won on points 6–0.

=== Match S3 ===
May 11, 2011
19:30 UTC−03:00

Peñarol (Uruguay)	2–0	(Chile) Universidad Católica
Olivera 36'; Martinuccio 90+3'	Report

Estadio Centenario, Montevideo
Attendance: 46,550
Referee: Héctor Baldassi (Argentina)

May 19, 2011
19:00 UTC−04:00

Universidad Católica (Chile)	2–1	(Uruguay) Peñarol
Meneses 18'; Gutiérrez 69'	Report	Estoyanoff 85'

Estadio San Carlos de Apoquindo, Santiago
Attendance: 12,942
Referee: Heber Lopes (Brazil)

Tied on points 3–3, Peñarol won on goal difference.

=== Match S4 ===
May 12, 2011
20:45 UTC−05:00

Chiapas (Mexico)	1–1	(Paraguay) Cerro Porteño
Pedroza 90'	Report	Fabbro 72'

Estadio Víctor Manuel Reyna, Tuxtla Gutiérrez
Attendance: 14,022
Referee: Sergio Pezzotta (Argentina)

May 19, 2011
21:30 UTC−04:00

Cerro Porteño (Paraguay)	1–0	(Mexico) Chiapas
Benítez 72'	Report

Estadio General Pablo Rojas, Asunción
Attendance: 24,178
Referee: Darío Ubriaco (Uruguay)

Cerro Porteño won on points 4–1.

== Semifinals ==
Team 1 played the second leg at home.

Teams			Scores		Tie-breakers		
Team 1	Points	Team 2	1st leg	2nd leg	GD	AG	Pen.
Cerro Porteño (Paraguay)	1:4	(Brazil) Santos	0–1	3–3	—	—	—
Vélez Sársfield (Argentina)	3:3	(Uruguay) Peñarol	0–1	2–1	0:0	0:1	—

=== Match F1 ===
May 25, 2011
21:50 UTC−03:00

Santos (Brazil)	1–0	(Paraguay) Cerro Porteño
Edu Dracena 43'	Report

Estádio Municipal Paulo Machado de Carvalho (Pacaembú), São Paulo
Attendance: 31,434
Referee: Jorge Larrionda (Uruguay)

June 1, 2011
20:50 UTC−04:00

Cerro Porteño (Paraguay)	3–3	(Brazil) Santos
C. Benítez 31'; Lucero 60'; Fabbro 81'	Report	Zé Eduardo 2'; Barreto 28' (o.g.); Neymar 45+1'

Estadio General Pablo Rojas, Asunción
Attendance: 31,627
Referee: Wilmar Roldán (Colombia)

Santos won on points 4–1.

=== Match F2 ===
May 26, 2011
21:50 UTC−03:00

Peñarol (Uruguay)	1–0	(Argentina) Vélez Sársfield
D. Rodríguez 44'	Report

Estadio Centenario, Montevideo
Attendance: 52,904
Referee: Carlos Amarilla (Paraguay)

June 2, 2011
21:50 UTC−03:00

Vélez Sársfield (Argentina)	2–1	(Uruguay) Peñarol
Tobio 45+1'; Silva 66'	Report	Mier 33'

Estadio José Amalfitani, Buenos Aires
Referee: Enrique Osses (Chile)

Tied on points 3–3, Peñarol won on away goals.

== Finals ==
The Finals were played over two legs, with the higher-seeded team playing the second leg at home. If the teams were tied on points and goal difference at the end of regulation in the second leg, the away goals rule would not be applied and 30 minutes of extra time would be played. If still tied after extra time, the title would be decided by penalty shootout.

June 15, 2011
21:50 UTC−03:00

Peñarol (Uruguay)	0–0	(Brazil) Santos
	Report

Estadio Centenario, Montevideo
Referee: Carlos Amarilla (Paraguay)

June 22, 2011
21:50 UTC−03:00

Santos (Brazil)	2–1	(Uruguay) Peñarol
Neymar 46'; Danilo 68'	Report	Durval 79' (o.g.)

Estádio Municipal Paulo Machado de Carvalho (Pacaembu), São Paulo
Referee: Sergio Pezzotta (Argentina)

Santos won on points 4–1.
