= 2011 Copa Libertadores finals =

2011 Copa Libertadores de América finals
- Event: 2011 Copa Libertadores de América
Peñarol	Santos
(Uruguay)	(Brazil)
1	2
- on points

First leg
Peñarol	Santos
0	0
- Date: 15 June 2011
- Venue: Estadio Centenario, Montevideo
- Man of the Match: Durval
- Referee: Carlos Amarilla (Paraguay)
- Attendance: 63,371

Second leg
Santos	Peñarol
2	1
- Date: 22 June 2011
- Venue: Estádio Municipal Paulo Machado de Carvalho (Pacaembu), São Paulo
- Man of the Match: Arouca
- Referee: Sergio Pezzotta (Argentina)
- Attendance: 40,200

The 2011 Copa Libertadores de América finals were the final two-legged tie that decided the winner of the 2011 Copa Libertadores de América, the 52nd edition of the Copa Libertadores de América, South America's premier international club football tournament organized by CONMEBOL. The matches were played on 15 and 22 June 2011, between Brazilian club Santos and Uruguayan club Peñarol. Santos made their fourth finals appearance and first since 2003. Peñarol made their tenth finals appearance, and first since 1987. The two teams had previously met in the finals in 1962. Santos won the cup after beating Penarol 2–1 in the second leg of the final.

== Qualified teams ==
Team	Previous finals appearances (bold indicates winners)
(Uruguay) Peñarol	**1960**, **1961**, 1962, 1965, **1966**, 1970, **1982**, 1983, **1987**
(Brazil) Santos	**1962**, **1963**, 2003

== Venues ==
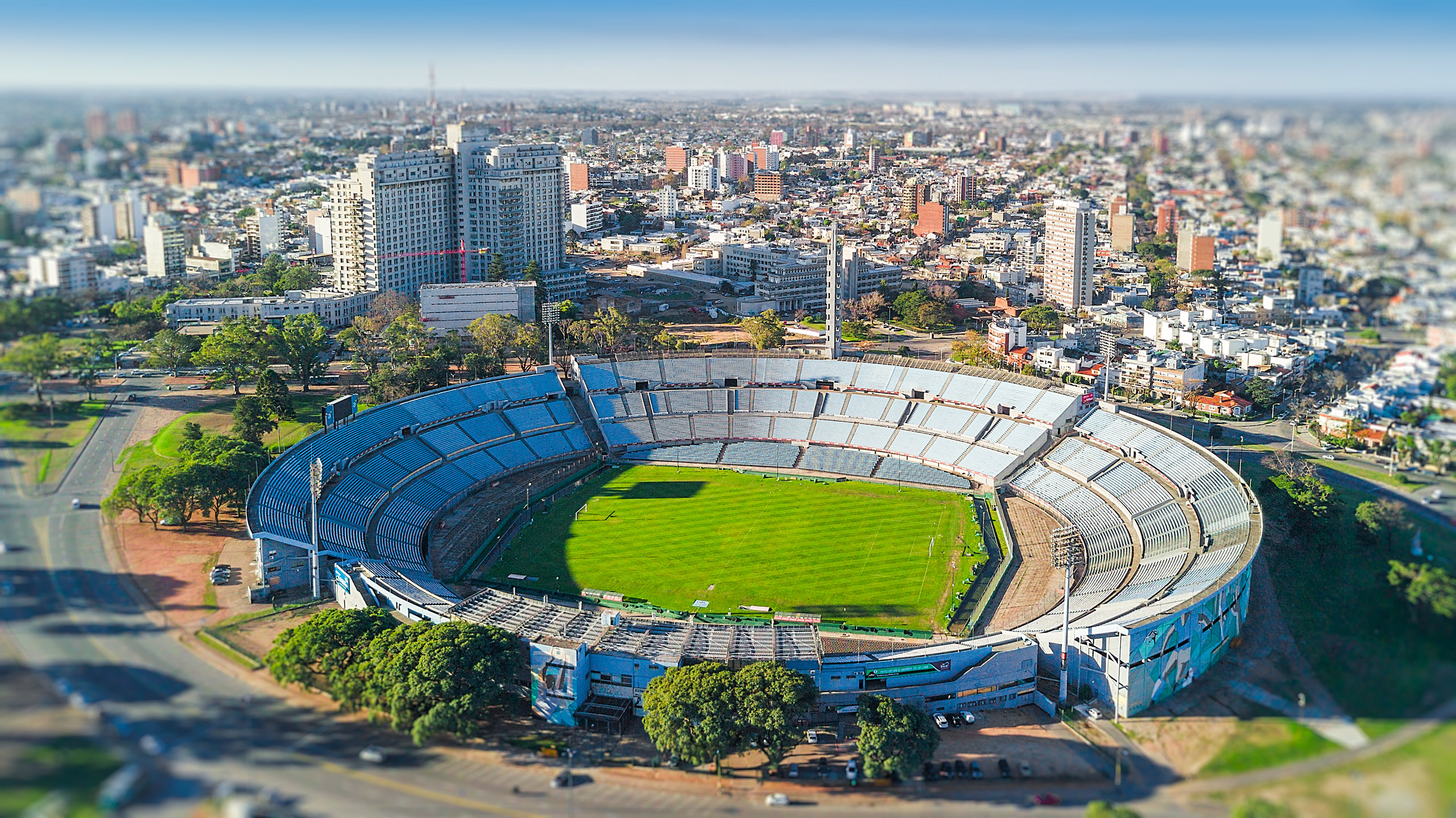
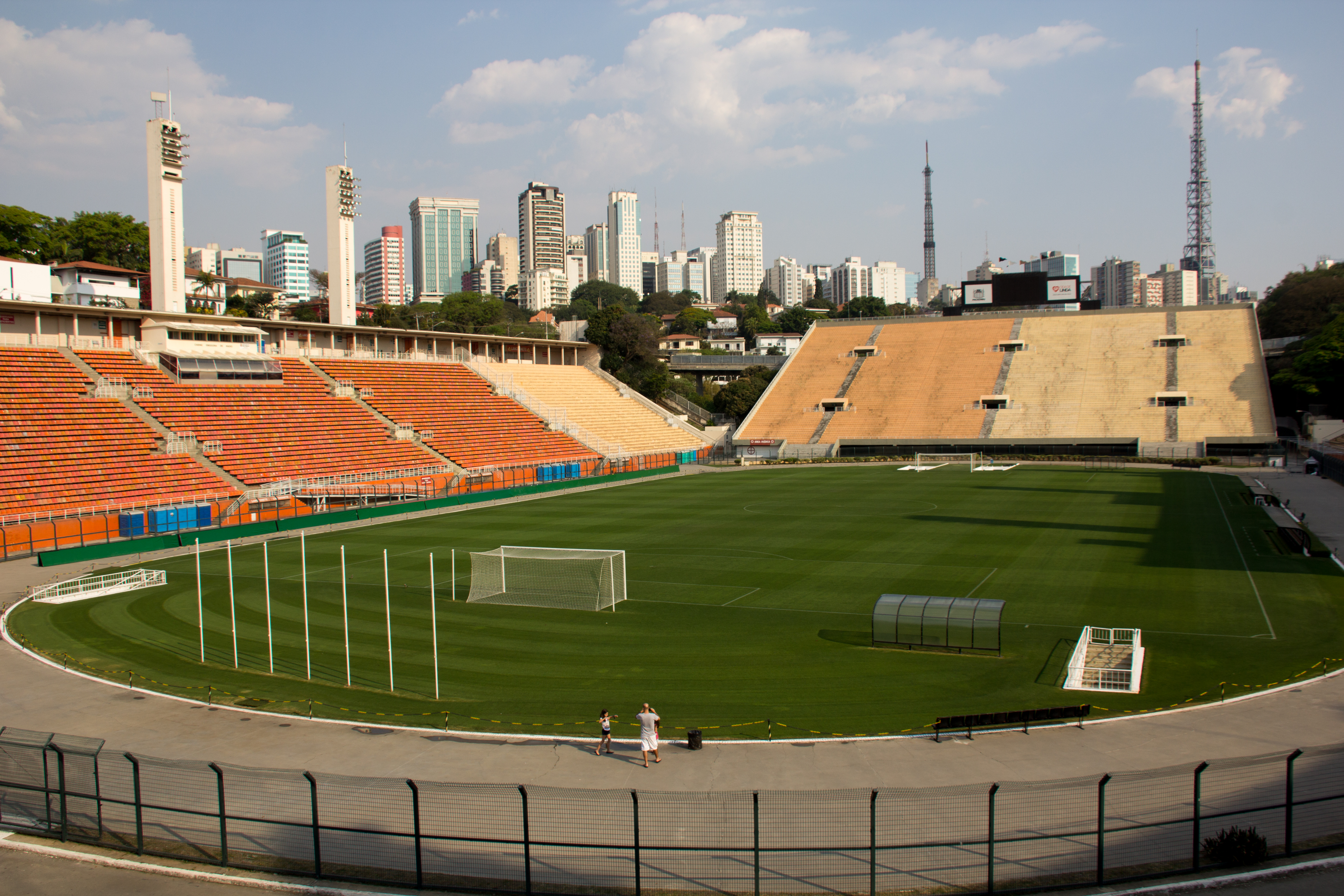
Estadio Centenario (left) and Estadio do Pacaembú, venues for the series

== Background ==
The final was contested by Brazilian side Santos and Peñarol of Uruguay, a historic repeat of the 1962 finals disputed by legendary players such as Pelé, Alberto Spencer, Gilmar, Juan Joya, Mauro, José Sasía, Mengálvio, Pedro Rocha, Coutinho, Juan Lezcano, and Pepe, with Lula coaching the Santistas and Béla Guttmann directing the Carboneros. This final is also the first between Brazilian and Uruguayan clubs since the 1983 finals in which Peñarol was dethroned by Grêmio. The venues for the finals is the Estadio Centenario in Montevideo and the Estádio Municipal Paulo Machado de Carvalho (Pacaembu) of São Paulo. Rodrigo Possebon, an Italian player of Santos, became the first European player to participate in a Copa Libertadores finals.

Both teams entered the competition having won it previously, Santos in 1962 and 1963; Peñarol in 1960, 1961, 1966, 1982 and 1987. To reach the final, in the knockout phase Santos beat América, Once Caldas and lastly Cerro Porteño, while Peñarol dethroned defending champion Internacional, beat Universidad Católica and overcame Vélez Sársfield. Santos entered the competition as champions of their domestic cup (the 2010 Copa do Brasil) while Peñarol participated as domestic league winner (winning the 2009–10 Primera División).

The winners would earn the right to represent CONMEBOL at the 2011 FIFA Club World Cup, entering at the semifinal stage. They would also play against the winners of the 2011 Copa Sudamericana in the 2012 Recopa Sudamericana. Neymar Jr was destined to be a great player already.

== Road to the finals ==
(Brazil) Santos			Round	(Uruguay) Peñarol		
Opponent	Venue	Score		Opponent	Venue	Score
Bye			First stage	Bye		
(Venezuela) Deportivo Táchira	Away	0–0	Second stage	(Argentina) Independiente	Away	0–3
(Paraguay) Cerro Porteño	Home	1–1	Second stage	(Argentina) Godoy Cruz	Away	3–1
(Chile) Colo-Colo	Away	2–3	Second stage	(Ecuador) LDU Quito	Home	1–0
(Chile) Colo-Colo	Home	3–2	Second stage	(Ecuador) LDU Quito	Away	0–5
(Paraguay) Cerro Porteño	Away	2–1	Second stage	(Argentina) Godoy Cruz	Home	2–1
(Venezuela) Deportivo Táchira	Home	3–1	Second stage	(Argentina) Independiente	Home	0–1
**Group 5 runner-up**: Team / Pld / W / D / L / GF / GA / GD / Pts; (Paraguay) Cerro Porteño / 6 / 3 / 2 / 1 / 13 / 8 / +5 / **11**; (Brazil) **Santos** / 6 / 3 / 2 / 1 / 11 / 8 / +3 / **11**; (Chile) Colo-Colo / 6 / 3 / 0 / 3 / 15 / 16 / −1 / **9**; (Venezuela) Deportivo Táchira / 6 / 0 / 2 / 4 / 5 / 12 / −7 / **2**			Second stage	**Group 8 runner-up**: Team / Pld / W / D / L / GF / GA / GD / Pts; (Ecuador) LDU Quito / 6 / 3 / 1 / 2 / 12 / 4 / +8 / **10**; (Uruguay) **Peñarol** / 6 / 3 / 0 / 3 / 6 / 11 / −5 / **9**; (Argentina) Independiente / 6 / 2 / 2 / 2 / 7 / 8 / −1 / **8**; (Argentina) Godoy Cruz / 6 / 2 / 1 / 3 / 8 / 10 / −2 / **7**		
(Mexico) América	Home	1–0	Round of 16	(Brazil) Internacional	Home	1–1
(Mexico) América	Away	0–0	Round of 16	(Brazil) Internacional	Away	2–1
(Colombia) Once Caldas	Away	1–0	Quarterfinals	(Chile) Universidad Católica	Home	2–0
(Colombia) Once Caldas	Home	1–1	Quarterfinals	(Chile) Universidad Católica	Away	1–2
(Paraguay) Cerro Porteño	Home	1–0	Semifinals	(Argentina) Vélez Sársfield	Home	1–0
(Paraguay) Cerro Porteño	Away	3–3	Semifinals	(Argentina) Vélez Sársfield	Away	1–2

== Rules ==
The final is played over two legs; home and away. The higher seeded team plays the second leg at home. The team that accumulates the most points —three for a win, one for a draw, zero for a loss— after the two legs is crowned the champion. Should the two teams be tied on points after the second leg, the team with the best goal difference wins. If the two teams have equal goal difference, the away goals rule is not applied, unlike the rest of the tournament. Extra time is played, which consists of two 15-minute halves. If the tie is still not broken, a penalty shootout ensues according to the Laws of the Game.

== Matches ==
=== First leg ===
15 June 2011
21:50 UTC−03:00

Peñarol (Uruguay)	0–0	(Brazil) Santos
	Report

Estadio Centenario, Montevideo
Attendance: 65,000
Referee: Carlos Amarilla (Paraguay)

**Peñarol**	**Santos**

PEÑAROL:
GK	1	(Uruguay) Sebastián Sosa
RB	22	(Uruguay) Darío Rodríguez (c)
CB	6	(Uruguay) Guillermo Rodríguez
CB	23	(Uruguay) Carlos Valdez
LB	4	(Uruguay) Alejandro González	(yellow card) 76'
CM	14	(Uruguay) Luis Aguiar
CM	5	(Uruguay) Nicolás Freitas
RW	18	(Uruguay) Matías Mier		(substituted off) 56'
LW	15	(Uruguay) Matias Corujo	(yellow card) 66'	(substituted off) 67'
CF	19	(Uruguay) Juan Manuel Olivera		(substituted off) 82'
CF	10	(Argentina) Alejandro Martinuccio	(yellow card) 30'
Substitutes:
GK	12	(Uruguay) Fabián Carini
DF	3	(Uruguay) Gerardo Alcoba
MF	8	(Uruguay) Antonio Pacheco		(substituted on) 67'
MF	24	(Uruguay) Emiliano Albín
MF	25	(Argentina) Nicolás Domingo
FW	9	(Uruguay) Diego Alonso		(substituted on) 82'
FW	11	(Uruguay) Fabián Estoyanoff		(substituted on) 56'
Manager:
Diego Aguirre

SANTOS:
GK	1	(Brazil) Rafael
RB	21	(Brazil) Pará
CB	14	(Brazil) Bruno Rodrigo
CB	6	(Brazil) Durval
LB	16	(Brazil) Alex Sandro
CM	5	(Brazil) Arouca	(yellow card) 60'
DM	22	(Brazil) Adriano
RM	15	(Brazil) Danilo
LM	8	(Brazil) Elano (c)		(substituted off) 79'
RF	20	(Brazil) Zé Eduardo		(substituted off) 89'
LF	11	(Brazil) Neymar	(yellow card) 19'
Substitutes:
GK	12	(Brazil) Aranha
DF	13	(Brazil) Bruno Aguiar		(substituted on) 89'
MF	7	(Brazil) Charles
MF	23	(Brazil) Felipe Anderson
MF	25	(Brazil) Alan Patrick		(substituted on) 79'
FW	9	(Brazil) Keirrison
FW	19	(Brazil) Diogo
Manager:
Muricy Ramalho

Man of the Match:
Durval (Santos)
Linesmans:
Nicolás Yegros (Paraguay)
Rodney Aquino (Paraguay)
Fourth official:
Antonio Arias (Paraguay)

=== Second leg ===
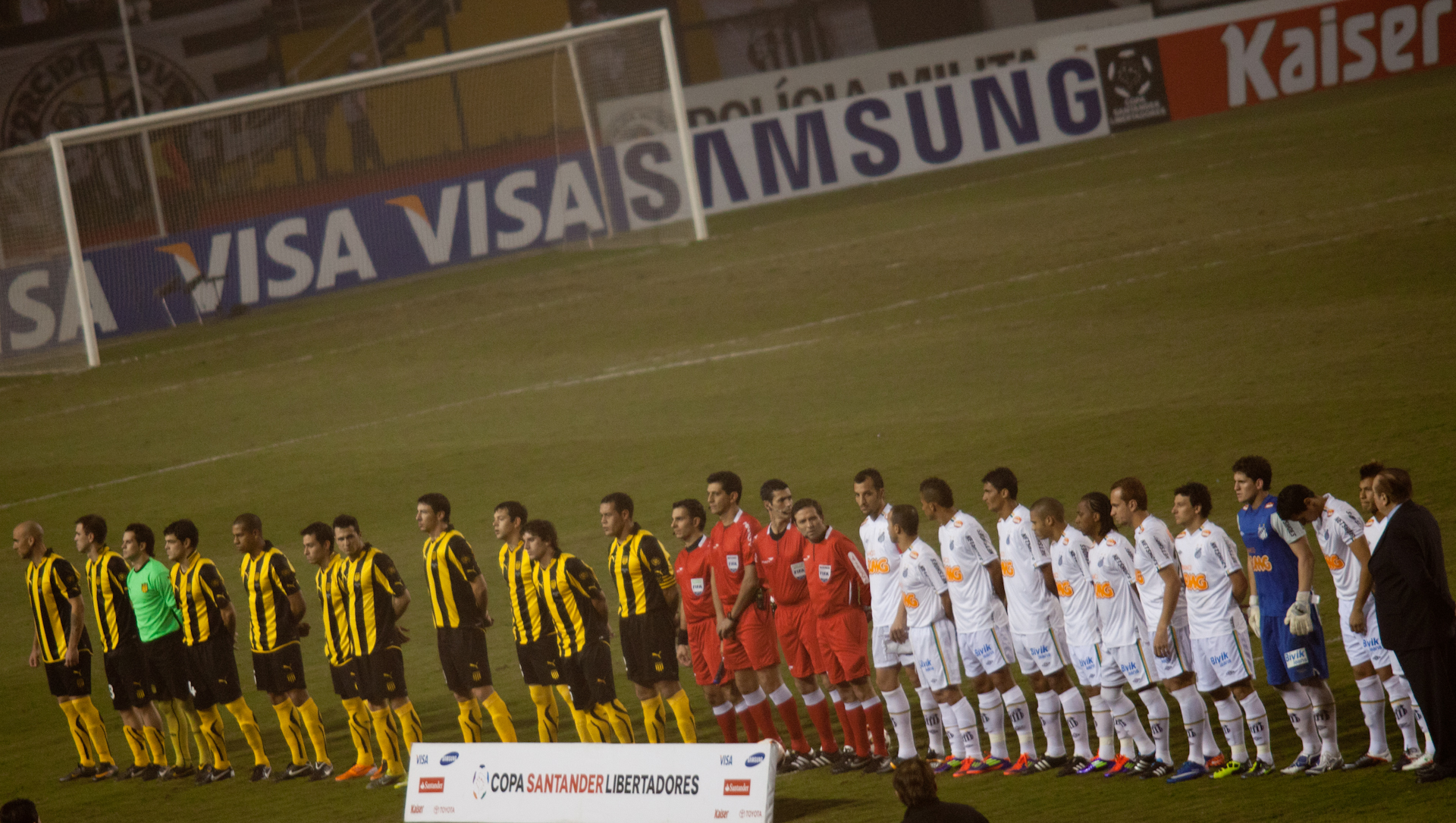
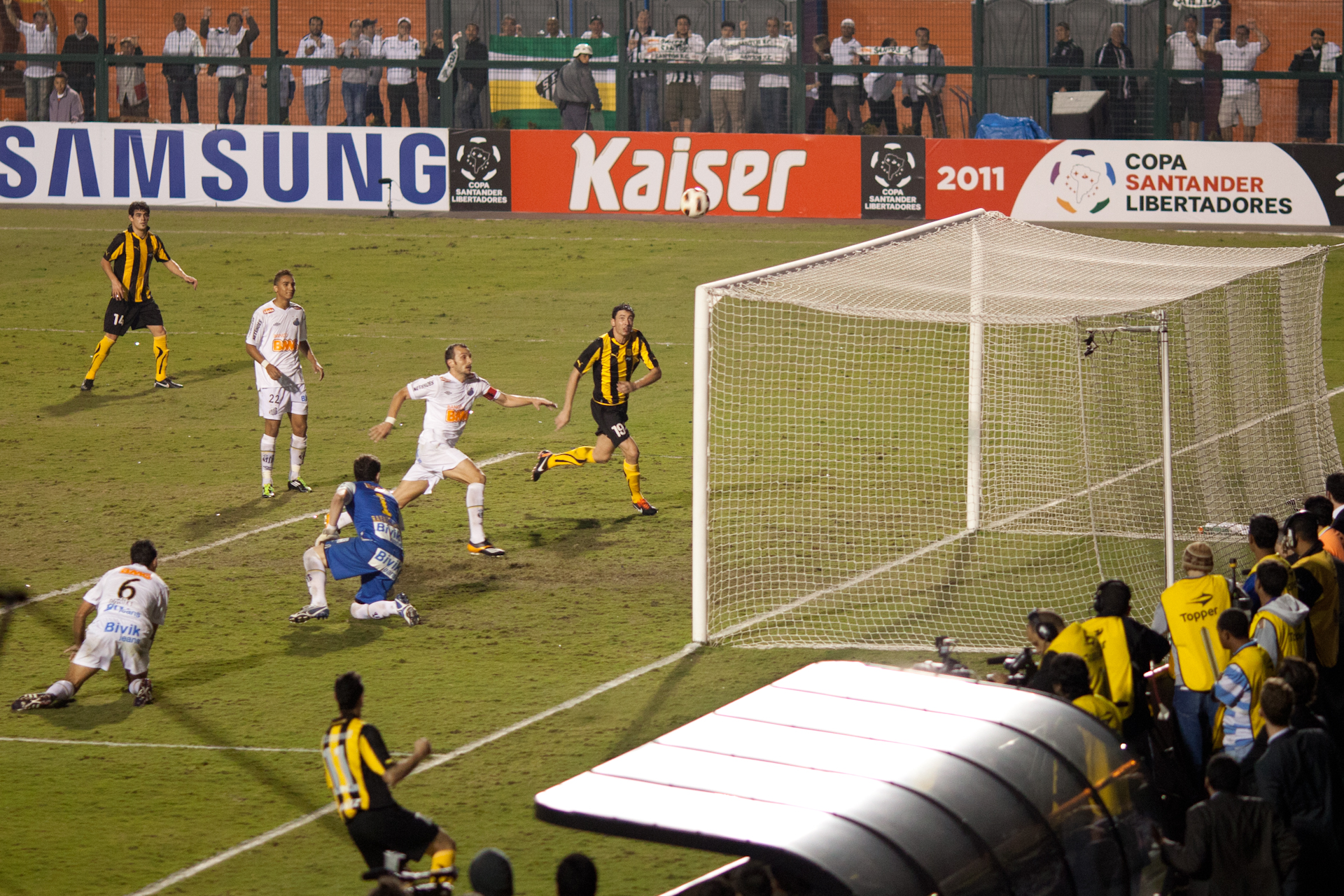
Two moments of the match played at Pacaembu Stadium
22 June 2011
21:50 UTC−03:00

Santos (Brazil)	2–1	(Uruguay) Peñarol
Neymar 47'; Danilo 69'	Report	Durval 80' (o.g.)

Pacaembu, São Paulo
Attendance: 40.200
Referee: Sergio Pezzotta (Argentina)

**Santos**	**Peñarol**

SANTOS:
GK	1	(Brazil) Rafael
RB	22	(Brazil) Danilo
CB	2	(Brazil) Edu Dracena (c)
CB	6	(Brazil) Durval
LB	3	(Brazil) Léo		(substituted off) 68'
CM	5	(Brazil) Arouca
DM	15	(Brazil) Adriano
RAM	10	(Brazil) Ganso		(substituted off) 86'
LAM	8	(Brazil) Elano
RF	20	(Brazil) Zé Eduardo	(yellow card) 58'
LF	11	(Brazil) Neymar	(yellow card) 35'
Substitutes:
GK	24	(Brazil) Vladimir
DF	14	(Brazil) Bruno Rodrigo
DF	16	(Brazil) Alex Sandro		(substituted on) 68'
DF	21	(Brazil) Pará		(substituted on) 86'
MF	17	(Brazil) Maikon Leite
MF	25	(Brazil) Alan Patrick
FW	9	(Brazil) Keirrison
Manager:
Muricy Ramalho

PEÑAROL:
GK	1	(Uruguay) Sebastián Sosa
RB	4	(Uruguay) Alejandro González	(yellow card) 31'	(substituted off) 38'
CB	23	(Uruguay) Carlos Valdez
CB	6	(Uruguay) Guillermo Rodríguez
LB	22	(Uruguay) Darío Rodríguez (c)
CM	14	(Uruguay) Luis Aguiar
CM	5	(Uruguay) Nicolás Freitas	(yellow card) 74'
RW	15	(Uruguay) Matias Corujo	(yellow card) 52'
LW	18	(Uruguay) Matías Mier		(substituted off) 63'
CF	10	(Argentina) Alejandro Martinuccio
CF	19	(Uruguay) Juan Manuel Olivera
Substitutes:
GK	12	(Uruguay) Fabián Carini
MF	8	(Uruguay) Antonio Pacheco
MF	17	(Uruguay) Jonathan Urretaviscaya		(substituted on) 63'
MF	24	(Uruguay) Emiliano Albín		(substituted on) 38'	(substituted off) 79'
MF	25	(Argentina) Nicolás Domingo
FW	9	(Uruguay) Diego Alonso
FW	11	(Uruguay) Fabián Estoyanoff		(substituted on) 79'
Manager:
Diego Aguirre

Man of the Match:
Arouca (Santos)

Linesmans:
Ricardo Casas (Argentina)
Hernán Maidana (Argentina)
Fourth official:
Juan Pompei (Argentina)

Copa Libertadores de América
2011 Champion

**Santos**
**Third Title**

== See also ==
- 2011 FIFA Club World Cup
- 2012 Recopa Sudamericana
