= 2011 Copa Libertadores =

52nd season of Copa Libertadores

2011 Copa Libertadores de América
2011 Copa Libertadores da América

Tournament details
- Dates: January 25–June 22, 2011
- Teams: 38 (from 11 associations)

Final positions
- Champions: (Brazil) Santos (3rd title)
- Runners-up: (Uruguay) Peñarol

Tournament statistics
- Matches played: 138
- Goals scored: 358 (2.59 per match)
- Top scorer(s): (Argentina) Roberto Nanni (Brazil) Wallyson (7 goals each)
- Best player: (Brazil) Neymar

The 2011 Copa Libertadores de América (officially the 2011 Copa Santander Libertadores de América for sponsorship reasons) was the 52nd edition of the Copa Libertadores de América, South America's premier international club football tournament organized by CONMEBOL. It was held from January 25 to June 22 of the same year. Brazilian club Internacional were the defending champion, but they were eliminated by Uruguayan team Peñarol in the round of 16. Internacional was succeeded by Brazilian club Santos, who won their third title after defeating Peñarol in the two-legged finals. Santos qualified to the 2011 FIFA Club World Cup and the 2012 Recopa Sudamericana.

== Qualified teams ==
Starting from 2011, the most recent Copa Sudamericana champion would earn a berth in the tournament. However, the country of the Copa Sudamericana champion would not gain an extra berth. The Copa Sudamericana champion would take the lowest-placed berth already assigned to the country if they did not qualify for the Copa Libertadores through domestic performance.

Association	Team (Berth)	Entry stage	Qualification method
(Argentina) Argentina; 5 berths	Argentinos Juniors (Argentina 1)	Second Stage	2010 Clausura champion
(Argentina) Argentina; 5 berths	Estudiantes (Argentina 2)	Second Stage	2010 Apertura champion
(Argentina) Argentina; 5 berths	Vélez Sársfield (Argentina 3)	Second Stage	2010 tournaments aggregate table best non-champion
(Argentina) Argentina; 5 berths	Godoy Cruz (Argentina 4)	Second Stage	2010 tournaments aggregate table 2nd best non-champion
(Argentina) Argentina; 5 berths	Independiente (Argentina 5)	First Stage	2010 Copa Sudamericana champion
(Bolivia) Bolivia; 3 berths	Jorge Wilstermann (Bolivia 1)	Second Stage	2010 Apertura champion
(Bolivia) Bolivia; 3 berths	Oriente Petrolero (Bolivia 2)	Second Stage	2010 Clausura champion
(Bolivia) Bolivia; 3 berths	Bolívar (Bolivia 3)	First Stage	2010 Clausura runner-up
(Brazil) Brazil; 5+1 berths	Internacional (Brazil 1)	Second Stage	2010 Copa Libertadores de América champion
(Brazil) Brazil; 5+1 berths	Santos (Brazil 2)	Second Stage	2010 Copa do Brasil champion
(Brazil) Brazil; 5+1 berths	Fluminense (Brazil 3)	Second Stage	2010 Campeonato Brasileiro Série A champion
(Brazil) Brazil; 5+1 berths	Cruzeiro (Brazil 4)	Second Stage	2010 Campeonato Brasileiro Série A runner-up
(Brazil) Brazil; 5+1 berths	Corinthians (Brazil 5)	First Stage	2010 Campeonato Brasileiro Série A 3rd place
(Brazil) Brazil; 5+1 berths	Grêmio (Brazil 6)	First Stage	2010 Campeonato Brasileiro Série A 4th place
(Chile) Chile; 3 berths	Universidad Católica (Chile 1)	Second Stage	2010 Primera División champion
(Chile) Chile; 3 berths	Colo-Colo (Chile 2)	Second Stage	2010 Primera División round 1 leader
(Chile) Chile; 3 berths	Unión Española (Chile 3)	First Stage	2010 Primera División Liguilla winner
(Colombia) Colombia; 3 berths	Junior (Colombia 1)	Second Stage	2010 Apertura champion
(Colombia) Colombia; 3 berths	Once Caldas (Colombia 2)	Second Stage	2010 Finalización champion
(Colombia) Colombia; 3 berths	Deportes Tolima (Colombia 3)	First Stage	2010 Primera A aggregate table best non-champion
(Ecuador) Ecuador; 3 berths	LDU Quito (Ecuador 1)	Second Stage	2010 Serie A champion
(Ecuador) Ecuador; 3 berths	Emelec (Ecuador 2)	Second Stage	2010 Serie A runner-up
(Ecuador) Ecuador; 3 berths	Deportivo Quito (Ecuador 3)	First Stage	2010 Serie A 3rd place
(Paraguay) Paraguay; 3 berths	Libertad (Paraguay 1)	Second Stage	2010 Primera División aggregate table best champion
(Paraguay) Paraguay; 3 berths	Guaraní (Paraguay 2)	Second Stage	2010 Primera División aggregate table 2nd best champion
(Paraguay) Paraguay; 3 berths	Cerro Porteño (Paraguay 3)	First Stage	2010 Primera División aggregate table best non-champion
(Peru) Peru; 3 berths	Universidad San Martín (Peru 1)	Second Stage	2010 Descentralizado champion
(Peru) Peru; 3 berths	León de Huánuco (Peru 2)	Second Stage	2010 Descentralizado runner-up
(Peru) Peru; 3 berths	Alianza Lima (Peru 3)	First Stage	2010 Descentralizado aggregate table best non-finalist
(Uruguay) Uruguay; 3 berths	Peñarol (Uruguay 1)	Second Stage	2009–10 Primera División champion
(Uruguay) Uruguay; 3 berths	Nacional (Uruguay 2)	Second Stage	2009–10 Primera División runner-up
(Uruguay) Uruguay; 3 berths	Liverpool (Uruguay 3)	First Stage	2009–10 Primera División aggregate table best non-finalist
(Venezuela) Venezuela; 3 berths	Caracas (Venezuela 1)	Second Stage	2009–10 Primera División champion
(Venezuela) Venezuela; 3 berths	Deportivo Táchira (Venezuela 2)	Second Stage	2009–10 Primera División runner-up
(Venezuela) Venezuela; 3 berths	Deportivo Petare (Venezuela 3)	First Stage	2009–10 Primera División aggregate table best non-finalist
Mexico (CONCACAF); 3 invitees	América (Mexico 1)	Second Stage	2010 Apertura classification phase best eligible team
Mexico (CONCACAF); 3 invitees	San Luis (Mexico 2)	Second Stage	2010 Apertura classification phase 2nd best eligible team
Mexico (CONCACAF); 3 invitees	Chiapas (Mexico 3)	First Stage	2010 Apertura classification phase 3rd best eligible team

== Draw ==
The draw for the 2011 Copa Libertadores was held on November 25, 2010, in Asunción. The drawing procedure for the 12 teams in the first stage was to alternatively draw a team from each pot. The drawing procedure for the 26 teams in the second stage was to draw out the pots beginning with Pot 1. One team from each pot would be placed, in the order of being drawn, into one of eight groups from 1 to 8. When drawing from Pot 3, if a team had been placed in a group where a team from the same football association was already placed, they were moved to the subsequent group until they were no longer in a group with a team from the same association. However, a first stage winner may be drawn with a team from the same association in the second stage.

For the first time, the seeded teams for the second stage were changed. Up until 2010, the 8 seeded teams included the reigning champion, and clubs from the football associations of Argentina and Brazil. For 2011, the seeded teams consisted of berths 1 from Argentina, Brazil, Colombia, Ecuador, Peru and Venezuela, and berths 2 from Argentina and Brazil. The reigning champion–Internacional–was berth 1 for Brazil. For 2012, Bolivia, Chile, Paraguay and Uruguay would all have their berth 1 teams be seeded teams instead of the berth 1 teams from Colombia, Ecuador, Peru and Venezuela.

Prior to the draw, it was announced that Caracas would be one of the eight seeded teams. During the draw, however, Deportivo Táchira was accidentally drawn as the seeded team for Group 4 and Caracas was drawn into Group 5 as a non-seeded team. After the ceremony, CONMEBOL recognized their error and transferred Caracas over to Group 4 and Deportivo Táchira over to Group 5.

First stage
Pot 1	Pot 2
(Argentina) Independiente^{1}; (Brazil) Corinthians^{1}; (Brazil) Grêmio^{1}; (Chile) Unión Española^{1}; (Paraguay) Cerro Porteño^{1}; (Mexico) Chiapas^{1}	(Bolivia) Bolívar^{1}; (Colombia) Deportes Tolima^{1}; (Ecuador) Deportivo Quito^{1}; (Peru) Alianza Lima^{1}; (Uruguay) Liverpool; (Venezuela) Deportivo Petare

Second stage
Pot 1	Pot 2	Pot 3	Pot 4
(Brazil) Internacional; (Argentina) Argentinos Juniors; (Argentina) Estudiantes^{1}; (Brazil) Santos; (Colombia) Junior; (Ecuador) LDU Quito^{1}; (Peru) Universidad San Martín^{1}; (Venezuela) Caracas	(Bolivia) Jorge Wilstermann; (Bolivia) Oriente Petrolero^{1}; (Chile) Universidad Católica^{1}; (Chile) Colo-Colo^{1}; (Paraguay) Libertad^{1}; (Paraguay) Guaraní^{1}; (Uruguay) Peñarol; (Uruguay) Nacional	(Argentina) Vélez Sársfield^{1}; (Argentina) Godoy Cruz^{1}; (Brazil) Fluminense^{1}; (Brazil) Cruzeiro^{1}; (Colombia) Once Caldas^{1}; (Ecuador) Emelec^{1}; (Peru) León de Huánuco^{1}; (Venezuela) Deportivo Táchira	Winner 1; Winner 2; Winner 3; Winner 4; Winner 5; Winner 6; (Mexico) América; (Mexico) San Luis

^{1}Teams had not yet fully qualified to the specific berth when the draw took place.

== Schedule ==
All dates listed are Wednesdays, but matches may be played on the day before (Tuesdays) and after (Thursdays) as well.

Stage	First leg	Second leg
First stage	January 26	February 2
Second stage	February 9, 16, 23; March 2, 9, 16, 23, 30; April 6, 13, 20	
Round of 16	April 27	May 4
Quarter-finals	May 11	May 18
Semi-finals	May 25	June 1
Finals	June 15	June 22

== First stage ==
The First Stage began on January 25 and ended on February 3. Team 1 played the second leg at home.

Teams			Scores		Tie-breakers		
Team 1	Points	Team 2	1st leg	2nd leg	GD	AG	Pen.
Deportes Tolima (Colombia)	4:1	(Brazil) Corinthians	0–0	2–0	—	—	—
Chiapas (Mexico)	4:0	(Peru) Alianza Lima	2–0	2–0	—	—	—
Deportivo Petare (Venezuela)	1:4	(Paraguay) Cerro Porteño	0–1	1–1	—	—	—
Unión Española (Chile)	4:1	(Bolivia) Bolívar	1–0	0–0	—	—	—
Deportivo Quito (Ecuador)	3:3	(Argentina) Independiente	0–2	1–0	−1:+1	—	—
Grêmio (Brazil)	4:1	(Uruguay) Liverpool	2–2	3–1	—	—	—

== Second stage ==
The Second Stage, played in home-and-away round-robin format, began on February 9 and ended on April 20. The top two teams from each group qualified for the knockout stages.

=== Group 1 ===
Pos	Team	Pld	W	D	L	GF	GA	GD	Pts	LIB	OCA	USM	SLU
1	(Paraguay) Libertad	6	4	2	0	13	5	+8	14		2–2	5–1	2–0
2	(Colombia) Once Caldas	6	1	4	1	7	8	−1	7	1–1		0–3	1–1
3	(Peru) Universidad San Martín	6	2	0	4	7	11	−4	6	0–1	0–2		2–0
4	(Mexico) San Luis	6	1	2	3	6	9	−3	5	1–2	1–1	3–1	

=== Group 2 ===
Pos	Team	Pld	W	D	L	GF	GA	GD	Pts	JUN	GRE	OPE	LHU
1	(Colombia) Junior	6	4	1	1	9	7	+2	13		2–1	2–1	1–1
2	(Brazil) Grêmio	6	3	1	2	9	6	+3	10	2–0		3–0	2–0
3	(Bolivia) Oriente Petrolero	6	2	0	4	7	8	−1	6	1–2	3–0		2–0
4	(Peru) León de Huánuco	6	1	2	3	4	8	−4	5	1–2	1–1	1–0	

=== Group 3 ===
Pos	Team	Pld	W	D	L	GF	GA	GD	Pts	AME	FLU	NAC	ARG
1	(Mexico) América	6	3	1	2	8	7	+1	10		1–0	2–0	2–1
2	(Brazil) Fluminense	6	2	2	2	9	9	0	8	3–2		0–0	2–2
3	(Uruguay) Nacional	6	2	2	2	3	3	0	8	0–0	2–0		0–1
4	(Argentina) Argentinos Juniors	6	2	1	3	9	10	−1	7	3–1	2–4	0–1	

=== Group 4 ===
Pos	Team	Pld	W	D	L	GF	GA	GD	Pts	UC	VEL	CAR	UE
1	(Chile) Universidad Católica	6	3	2	1	11	9	+2	11		0–0	1–3	2–1
2	(Argentina) Vélez Sársfield	6	3	1	2	12	7	+5	10	3–4		3–0	2–1
3	(Venezuela) Caracas	6	3	0	3	7	10	−3	9	0–2	0–3		2–0
4	(Chile) Unión Española	6	1	1	4	7	11	−4	4	2–2	2–1	1–2	

=== Group 5 ===
Pos	Team	Pld	W	D	L	GF	GA	GD	Pts	CPO	SAN	CC	TAC
1	(Paraguay) Cerro Porteño	6	3	2	1	13	8	+5	11		1–2	5–2	1–1
2	(Brazil) Santos	6	3	2	1	11	8	+3	11	1–1		3–2	3–1
3	(Chile) Colo-Colo	6	3	0	3	15	16	−1	9	2–3	3–2		2–1
4	(Venezuela) Deportivo Táchira	6	0	2	4	5	12	−7	2	0–2	0–0	2–4	

=== Group 6 ===
Pos	Team	Pld	W	D	L	GF	GA	GD	Pts	INT	CHI	EME	WIL
1	(Brazil) Internacional	6	4	1	1	14	3	+11	13		4–0	2–0	3–0
2	(Mexico) Chiapas	6	3	0	3	6	8	−2	9	1–0		2–1	2–0
3	(Ecuador) Emelec	6	2	2	2	4	5	−1	8	1–1	1–0		1–0
4	(Bolivia) Jorge Wilstermann	6	1	1	4	3	11	−8	4	1–4	2–1	0–0	

=== Group 7 ===
Pos	Team	Pld	W	D	L	GF	GA	GD	Pts	CRU	EST	TOL	GUA
1	(Brazil) Cruzeiro	6	5	1	0	20	1	+19	16		5–0	6–1	4–0
2	(Argentina) Estudiantes	6	3	1	2	9	11	−2	10	0–3		1–0	5–1
3	(Colombia) Deportes Tolima	6	2	2	2	5	8	−3	8	0–0	1–1		1–0
4	(Paraguay) Guaraní	6	0	0	6	2	16	−14	0	0–2	1–2	0–2	

=== Group 8 ===
Pos	Team	Pld	W	D	L	GF	GA	GD	Pts	LDU	PEN	IND	GCR
1	(Ecuador) LDU Quito	6	3	1	2	12	4	+8	10		5–0	3–0	2–0
2	(Uruguay) Peñarol	6	3	0	3	6	11	−5	9	1–0		0–1	2–1
3	(Argentina) Independiente	6	2	2	2	7	8	−1	8	1–1	3–0		1–3
4	(Argentina) Godoy Cruz	6	2	1	3	8	10	−2	7	2–1	1–3	1–1	

== Knockout stages ==
The last four stages of the tournament (round of 16, quarter-finals, semi-finals, and finals), played in home-and-away two-legged format, form a single-elimination tournament, contested by the sixteen teams which advance from the Second Stage. In each tie, the team with the higher seed will play at home in the second leg.

=== Seeding ===
The 16 qualified teams are seeded in the knockout stages according to their results in the second stage, with the group winners seeded 1–8, and the group runners-up seeded 9–16. The teams were ranked by: 1. Points (Pts); 2. Goal difference (GD); 3. Goals scored (GF); 4. Away goals (AG); 5. Drawing of lots.

Teams qualified as a group winner
Seed	Team	Pts	GD	GF	AG
1	(Brazil) Cruzeiro	16	+19	20	5
2	(Paraguay) Libertad	14	+8	13	4
3	(Brazil) Internacional	13	+11	14	5
4	(Colombia) Junior	13	+2	9	4
5	(Paraguay) Cerro Porteño	11	+5	13	6
6	(Chile) Universidad Católica	11	+2	11	8
7	(Ecuador) LDU Quito	10	+8	12	2
8	(Mexico) América	10	+1	8	3

Teams qualified as a group runner-up
Seed	Team	Pts	GD	GF	AG
9	(Brazil) Santos	11	+3	11	4
10	(Argentina) Vélez Sársfield	10	+5	12	4
11	(Brazil) Grêmio	10	+3	9	2
12	(Argentina) Estudiantes	10	−2	9	3
13	(Mexico) Chiapas	9	−2	6	1
14	(Uruguay) Peñarol	9	−5	6	3
15	(Brazil) Fluminense	8	0	9	4
16	(Colombia) Once Caldas	7	−1	7	5

=== Bracket ===
Round of 16
5	(Paraguay) Cerro Porteño (p)	0	0 (5)
12	(Argentina) Estudiantes	0	0 (3)
4	(Colombia) Junior	1	3
13	(Mexico) Chiapas (a)	1	3
8	(Mexico) América	0	0
9	(Brazil) Santos	1	0
1	(Brazil) Cruzeiro	2	0
16	(Colombia) Once Caldas	1	2
2	(Paraguay) Libertad	1	3
15	(Brazil) Fluminense	3	0
7	(Ecuador) LDU Quito	0	0
10	(Argentina) Vélez Sársfield	3	2
6	(Chile) U. Católica	2	1
11	(Brazil) Grêmio	1	0
3	(Brazil) Internacional	1	1
14	(Uruguay) Peñarol	1	2

Quarter-finals
5	(Paraguay) Cerro Porteño	1	1
13	(Mexico) Chiapas	1	0
9	(Brazil) Santos	1	1
16	(Colombia) Once Caldas	0	1
2	(Paraguay) Libertad	0	2
10	(Argentina) Vélez Sársfield	3	4
6	(Chile) U. Católica	0	2
14	(Uruguay) Peñarol	2	1

Semi-finals
5	(Paraguay) Cerro Porteño	0	3
9	(Brazil) Santos	1	3
10	(Argentina) Vélez Sársfield	0	2
14	(Uruguay) Peñarol (a)	1	1

Finals
9	(Brazil) Santos	0	2
14	(Uruguay) Peñarol	0	1

=== Round of 16 ===
The Round of 16 began on April 26 and ended on May 5. Team 1 played the second leg at home.

Teams			Scores		Tie-breakers		
Team 1	Points	Team 2	1st leg	2nd leg	GD	AG	Pen.
Cruzeiro (Brazil)	3:3	(Colombia) Once Caldas	2–1	0–2	−1:+1	—	—
Libertad (Paraguay)	3:3	(Brazil) Fluminense	1–3	3–0	+1:−1	—	—
Internacional (Brazil)	1:4	(Uruguay) Peñarol	1–1	1–2	—	—	—
Junior (Colombia)	2:2	(Mexico) Chiapas	1–1	3–3	0:0	1:3	—
Cerro Porteño (Paraguay)	2:2	(Argentina) Estudiantes	0–0	0–0	0:0	0:0	5–3
Universidad Católica (Chile)	6:0	(Brazil) Grêmio	2–1	1–0	—	—	—
LDU Quito (Ecuador)	0:6	(Argentina) Vélez Sársfield	0–3	0–2	—	—	—
América (Mexico)	1:4	(Brazil) Santos	0–1	0–0	—	—	—

=== Quarter-finals ===
The Quarterfinals began on May 11 and ended on May 19. Team 1 played the second leg at home.

Teams			Scores		Tie-breakers		
Team 1	Points	Team 2	1st leg	2nd leg	GD	AG	Pen.
Libertad (Paraguay)	0:6	(Argentina) Vélez Sársfield	0–3	2–4	—	—	—
Cerro Porteño (Paraguay)	2:1	(Mexico) Chiapas	1–1	1–0	—	—	—
Universidad Católica (Chile)	3:3	(Uruguay) Peñarol	0–2	2–1	−1:+1	—	—
Santos (Brazil)	2:1	(Colombia) Once Caldas	1–0	1–1	—	—	—

=== Semi-finals ===
The Semi-finals began on May 25 and ended on June 2. Team 1 played the second leg at home.

Teams			Scores		Tie-breakers		
Team 1	Points	Team 2	1st leg	2nd leg	GD	AG	Pen.
Cerro Porteño (Paraguay)	3:4	(Brazil) Santos	0–1	3–3	—	—	—
Vélez Sársfield (Argentina)	3:3	(Uruguay) Peñarol	0–1	2–1	0:0	0:1	—

=== Finals ===
The Finals were played over two legs, with the higher-seeded team playing the second leg at home. If the teams were tied on points and goal difference at the end of regulation in the second leg, the away goals rule would not be applied and 30 minutes of extra time would be played. If still tied after extra time, the title would be decided by penalty shootout.

June 15, 2011
21:50 UTC−3

Peñarol (Uruguay)	0–0	(Brazil) Santos
	Report

Estadio Centenario, Montevideo
Attendance: 65,000
Referee: Carlos Amarilla (Paraguay)

June 22, 2011
21:50 UTC−3

Santos (Brazil)	2–1	(Uruguay) Peñarol
Neymar 46'; Danilo 68'	Report	Durval 79' (o.g.)

Estádio Municipal Paulo Machado de Carvalho (Pacaembu), São Paulo
Attendance: 40,200
Referee: Sergio Pezzota (Argentina)

Santos won on points 2-1.

Copa Libertadores de América
2011 Champion

Santos
Third Title

== Top goalscorers ==
Pos	Player	Club	Goals
1	(Argentina) Roberto Nanni	(Paraguay) Cerro Porteño	7
1	(Brazil) Wallyson	(Brazil) Cruzeiro	7
3	(Brazil) Neymar	(Brazil) Santos	6
3	(Argentina) Lucas Pratto	(Chile) Universidad Católica	6
5	(Argentina) Maximiliano Moralez	(Argentina) Vélez Sársfield	5
5	(Uruguay) Juan Manuel Olivera	(Uruguay) Peñarol	5
5	(Colombia) Wason Rentería	(Colombia) Once Caldas	5
8	(Colombia) Carlos Bacca	(Colombia) Junior	4
8	(Brazil) Douglas	(Brazil) Grêmio	4
8	(Paraguay) Jonathan Fabbro	(Paraguay) Cerro Porteño	4
8	(Argentina) Augusto Fernández	(Argentina) Vélez Sársfield	4
8	(Brazil) Leandro Damião	(Brazil) Internacional	4
8	(Argentina) Franco Niell	(Argentina) Argentinos Juniors	4
8	(Chile) Esteban Paredes	(Chile) Colo-Colo	4
8	(Argentina) Nicolás Pavlovich	(Paraguay) Libertad	4
8	(Brazil) Rafael Moura	(Brazil) Fluminense	4
8	(Uruguay) Santiago Silva	(Argentina) Vélez Sársfield	4
8	(Brazil) Thiago Ribeiro	(Brazil) Cruzeiro	4

== Awards ==
=== Best Player ===
Player	Team	Notes
Neymar	(Brazil) Santos	

=== Player of the week ===
Week	Player	Team	Notes
4	(Argentina) Walter Montillo	(Brazil) Cruzeiro	
5	(Argentina) Patricio Rodríguez	(Argentina) Independiente	
6	(Uruguay) Juan Manuel Olivera	(Uruguay) Peñarol	
7	(Colombia) Luis Carlos Cabezas	(Venezuela) Caracas	
8	(Colombia) Carlos Bacca	(Colombia) Junior	
9	(Chile) José Luis Villanueva	(Chile) Universidad Católica	
10	(Brazil) Thiago Ribeiro	(Brazil) Cruzeiro	
11	(Argentina) Roberto Nanni	(Paraguay) Cerro Porteño	
12	(Argentina) Hernán Barcos	(Ecuador) LDU Quito	
13	(Paraguay) Jonathan Fabbro	(Paraguay) Cerro Porteño	
14	(Argentina) Lucas Pratto	(Chile) Universidad Católica	
15	(Colombia) Dayro Moreno	(Colombia) Once Caldas	
16	(Argentina) Juan Manuel Martínez	(Argentina) Vélez Sársfield	
17	(Argentina) Maximiliano Moralez	(Argentina) Vélez Sársfield	
18	(Uruguay) Darío Rodríguez	(Uruguay) Peñarol	

== See also ==
- 2011 FIFA Club World Cup
- 2011 Copa Sudamericana
- 2012 Recopa Sudamericana
- 2011 U-20 Copa Libertadores
