= 2011 Copa Libertadores First Stage =

The First Stage of the 2011 Copa Santander Libertadores de América football tournament ran from January 25 to February 3, 2011 (first legs: January 25–27; second legs: February 1–3).

== Format ==
The twelve teams were drawn into six ties on November 25, 2010, in Asunción.

Teams played in two-legged ties on a home-away basis. Each team earned 3 points for a win, 1 point for a draw, and 0 points for a loss. The following criteria were used for breaking ties on points:

1. Goal difference
2. Away goals
3. Penalty shootout (no extra time is played)

The six winners advanced to the second stage to join the 26 automatic qualifiers.

== Matches ==
Team 1 played the second leg at home.

Teams			Scores		Tie-breakers		
Team 1	Points	Team 2	1st leg	2nd leg	GD	AG	Pen.
Deportes Tolima (Colombia)	4:1	(Brazil) Corinthians	0–0	2–0	—	—	—
Chiapas (Mexico)	6:0	(Peru) Alianza Lima	2–0	2–0	—	—	—
Deportivo Petare (Venezuela)	1:4	(Paraguay) Cerro Porteño	0–1	1–1	—	—	—
Unión Española (Chile)	4:1	(Bolivia) Bolívar	1–0	0–0	—	—	—
Deportivo Quito (Ecuador)	3:3	(Argentina) Independiente	0–2	1–0	−1:+1	—	—
Grêmio (Brazil)	4:1	(Uruguay) Liverpool	2–2	3–1	—	—	—

=== Match G1 ===
January 26, 2011
22:00 UTC−02:00

Corinthians (Brazil)	0–0	(Colombia) Deportes Tolima
	Report

Estádio Municipal Paulo Machado de Carvalho (Pacaembu), São Paulo
Attendance: 26,536
Referee: Enrique Osses (Chile)

February 2, 2011
19:00 UTC−05:00

Deportes Tolima (Colombia)	2–0	(Brazil) Corinthians
Santoya 65'; Medina 77'	Report

Estadio Manuel Murillo Toro, Ibagué
Attendance: 15,014
Referee: Roberto Silvera (Uruguay)

Deportes Tolima won on points 4–1.

=== Match G2 ===
January 26, 2011
21:15 UTC−05:00

Alianza Lima (Peru)	0–2	(Mexico) Chiapas
	Report	Pedroza 41'; Rodríguez 45+1' (pen.)

Estadio Alejandro Villanueva, Lima
Attendance: 28,285
Referee: Néstor Pitana (Argentina)

February 1, 2011
21:15 UTC−06:00

Chiapas (Mexico)	2–0	(Peru) Alianza Lima
Pedroza 68'; Salazar 74'	Report

Estadio Víctor Manuel Reyna, Tuxtla Gutiérrez
Attendance: 6,800
Referee: José Buitrago (Colombia)

Jaguares won on points 6–0.

=== Match G3 ===
January 27, 2011
20:00 UTC−03:00

Cerro Porteño (Paraguay)	1–0	(Venezuela) Deportivo Petare
Nanni 70'	Report

Estadio General Pablo Rojas, Asunción
Attendance: 15,663
Referee: Paulo César Oliveira (Brazil)

February 3, 2011
21:00 UTC−04:30

Deportivo Petare (Venezuela)	1–1	(Paraguay) Cerro Porteño
Guazá 13'	Report	Nanni 34'

Estadio Olímpico de la UCV, Caracas
Attendance: 2,897
Referee: Carlos Vera (Ecuador)

Cerro Porteño won on points 4–1.

=== Match G4 ===
January 27, 2011
21:15 UTC−04:00

Bolívar (Bolivia)	0–1	(Chile) Unión Española
	Report	Cordero 17'

Estadio Hernando Siles, La Paz
Attendance: 20,433
Referee: Víctor Hugo Rivera (Peru)

February 3, 2011
20:00 UTC−03:00

Unión Española (Chile)	0–0	(Bolivia) Bolívar
	Report

Estadio Santa Laura, Santiago
Attendance: 5,245
Referee: Carlos Amarilla (Paraguay)

Unión Española won on points 4–1.

=== Match G5 ===
January 25, 2011
21:15 UTC−03:00

Independiente (Argentina)	2–0	(Ecuador) Deportivo Quito
Defederico 49'; Rodríguez 70'	Report

Estadio Libertadores de América, Avellaneda
Attendance: 16,844
Referee: Heber Lopes (Brazil)

February 1, 2011
19:45 UTC−05:00

Deportivo Quito (Ecuador)	1–0	(Argentina) Independiente
Quiñónez 56'	Report

Estadio Olímpico Atahualpa, Quito
Attendance: 12,029
Referee: Jorge Larrionda (Uruguay)

Tied on points 3–3, Independiente won on goal difference.

=== Match G6 ===
January 26, 2011
22:00 UTC−02:00

Liverpool (Uruguay)	2–2	(Brazil) Grêmio
Franco 9'; Macchi 25'	Report	André Lima 6'; Douglas 13'

Estadio Centenario, Montevideo
Attendance: 13,875
Referee: Carlos Torres (Paraguay)

February 2, 2011
22:00 UTC−02:00

Grêmio (Brazil)	3–1	(Uruguay) Liverpool
André Lima 37'; Vinícius Pacheco 57', 73'	Report	Alfaro 34'

Estádio Olímpico Monumental, Porto Alegre
Attendance: 31,426
Referee: Sergio Pezzotta (Argentina)

Grêmio won on points 4–1.
