= Luis Núñez (footballer, born 1983) =

Colombian footballer

Luis Nuñez
Personal information
- Full name: Luis Alberto Nuñez Charales
- Date of birth: 10 December 1983 (age 42)
- Place of birth: Santa Marta, Colombia
- Height: 1.72 m (5 ft 8 in)
- Position: Left-back

Senior career*
Years	Team	Apps	(Gls)
2003–2011	Once Caldas	110	(5)
2011	Cerro Porteño	5	(0)
2012	Cúcuta Deportivo	10	(2)
2012	Independiente Medellín	4	(0)
2013	Boyacá Chicó	30	(2)
2014	Patriotas	15	(0)
2014–2015	Dorados	6	(1)
2015	Atlético Bucaramanga	6	(0)

International career
2009–2010	Colombia	5	(1)
- * Club domestic league appearances and goals

Luis Alberto Nuñez Charales (born 10 December 1983 in Santa Marta) is a Colombian former footballer who played as a left back.

His form in the domestic league has led him to his first call up to the Colombia national football team for the FIFA World Cup qualifier match against Venezuela

On 15 March 2011, he scored a goal in the second half against the Mexican club San Luis in the Copa Libertadores.

== International goals ==
#	Date	Venue	Opponent	Score	Result	Competition
1	17 November 2010	Bogotá, Colombia	Peru	1–1	Draw	Friendly
