= Alejandro Martinuccio =

Argentine footballer (born 1987)

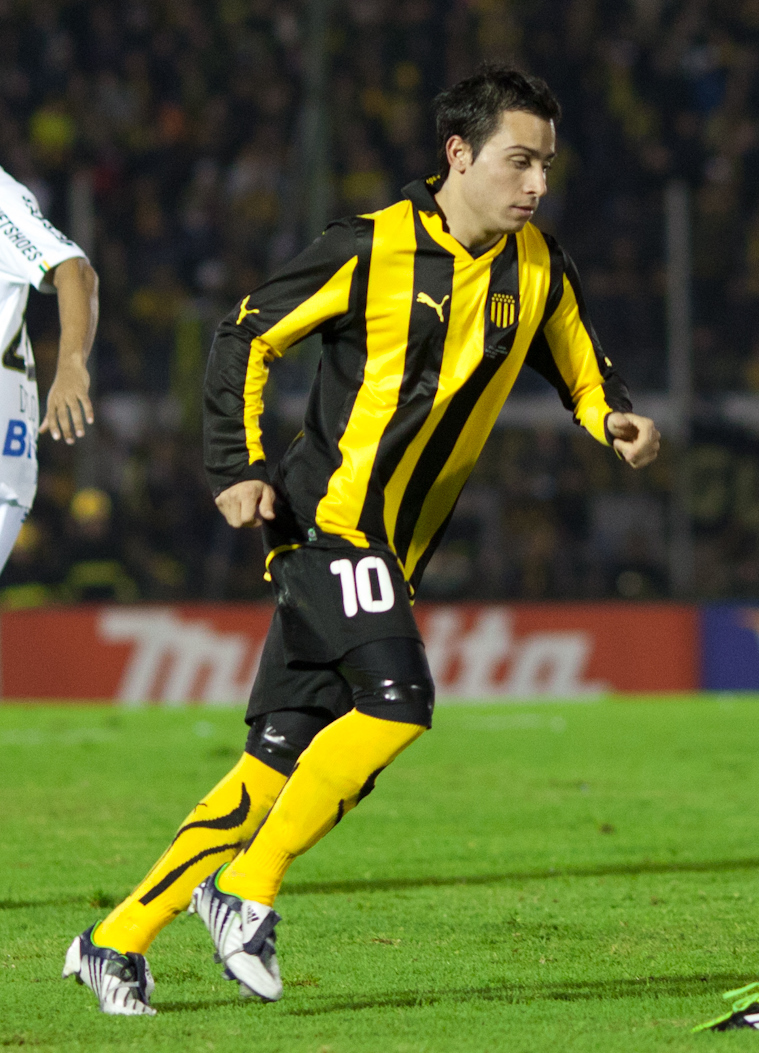

Personal information
- Full name: Alejandro Hernán Martinuccio
- Date of birth: 16 December 1987 (age 38)
- Place of birth: Buenos Aires, Argentina
- Height: 1.73 m (5 ft 8 in)
- Position: Forward

Team information
- Current team: Boston River
- Number: 8

Youth career
- River Plate
- Nueva Chicago

Senior career*
Years	Team	Apps	(Gls)
2007–2009	Nueva Chicago	17	(9)
2009–2011	Peñarol	56	(14)
2011–2015	Fluminense	15	(1)
2012	→ Villarreal (loan)	13	(1)
2012–2014	→ Cruzeiro (loan)	18	(4)
2014	→ Coritiba (loan)	13	(2)
2016–2017	Chapecoense	12	(1)
2017	Nueva Chicago	7	(2)
2018	Avaí	15	(2)
2019–2020	Móstoles	15	(3)
2020–	Boston River	8	(1)
- * Club domestic league appearances and goals as of 13:38, 6 October 2020 (UTC)

Alejandro "El Negro" Martinuccio (born 16 December 1987 in Buenos Aires) is an Argentine footballer who plays as a striker. He currently plays for Boston River.

== Career ==
=== Nueva Chicago ===
Martinuccio made his debut at Club Atlético Nueva Chicago in 2008 and after a remarkable individual performance with his team in the Primera B Metropolitana was transferred to Uruguayan club C.A. Peñarol.

=== Peñarol ===
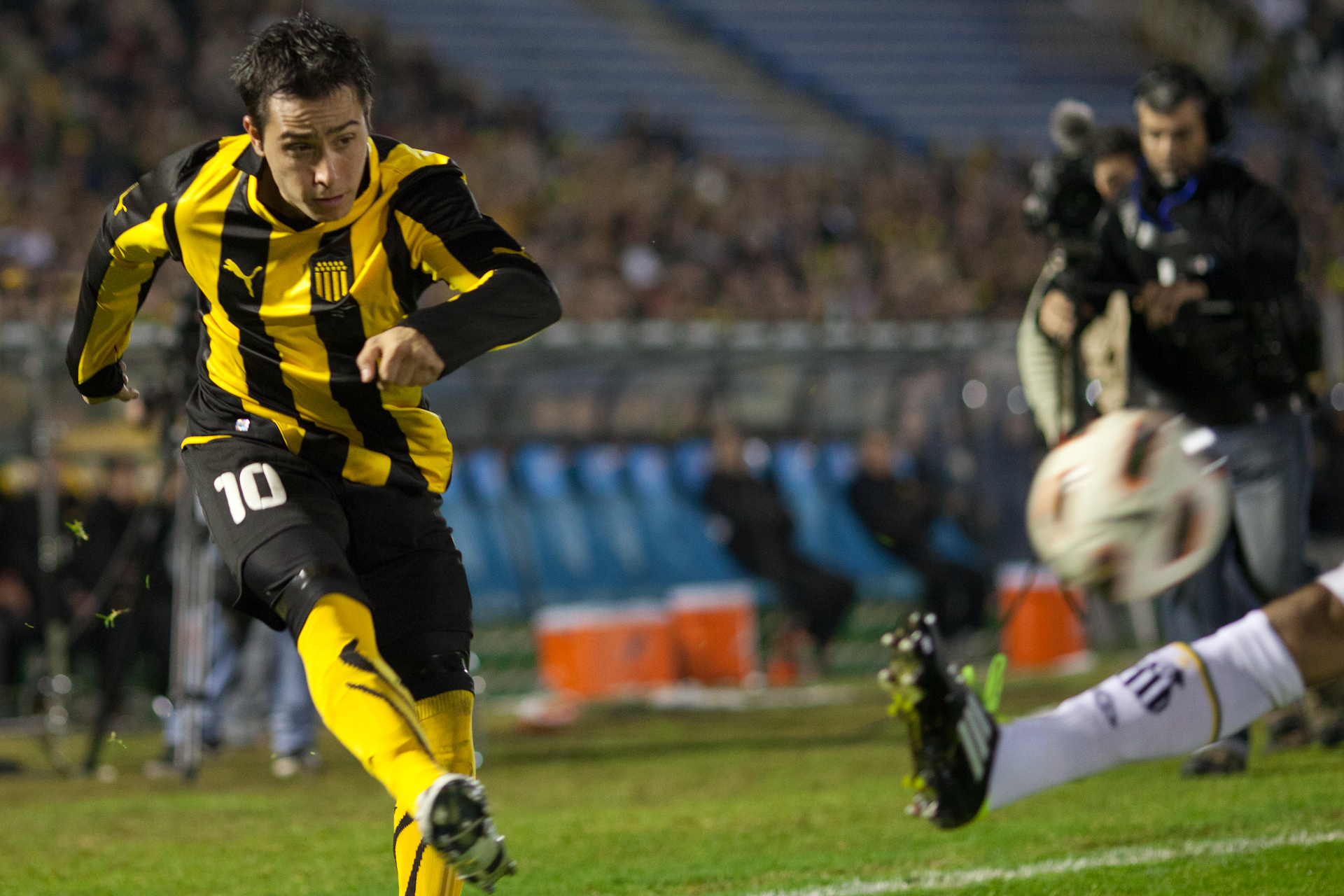
Martinuccio playing for Peñarol.

Martinuccio helped Peñarol reach the 2011 Copa Libertadores Finals, in which Peñarol lost to Brazil's Santos. He had thirteen appearances and scored 2 goals in the competition.

=== Fluminense ===
After a good display of football in the 2011 Copa Libertadores, Fluminense signed Martinuccio in July 2011.

=== Villarreal ===
Martinuccio joined Villarreal in January 2012 in a loan deal. He scored his first goal for the club against Real Zaragoza on March 4.

=== Cruzeiro ===
In July 2012, Cruzeiro signed Martinuccio on a one-year loan from Fluminense. He stayed there for another year until mid-2014 and won the 2013 Brazilian Série A and the 2014 Campeonato Mineiro. However, due to injuries he could never establish himself in the team and returned to Fluminense.

=== Coritiba ===
In June 2014 Martinuccio was loaned one more time, on this occasion to another Brazilian club, Coritiba. Once again he struggled with injuries.

=== Chapecoense ===
Without playing since November 2014 Chapecoense signed Alejandro on 30 April 2016. Martinuccio failed in medical exams at Ponte Preta before agreeing with Chapecoense. He had a chance to return to football after a series of serious injuries and surgeries on both legs. Because of a new injury, Martinuccio missed the ill-fated team flight which crashed near Medellín, where 71 people died.

== Career statistics ==
=== Club ===
As of 20 December 2016

Appearances and goals by club, season and competition
Club	Season	League			Cup		Continental		Other		Total	
Club	Season	Division	Apps	Goals	Apps	Goals	Apps	Goals	Apps	Goals	Apps	Goals
Nueva Chicago	2007–08	Primera B Nacional	8	0	0	0	—		—		8	0
Nueva Chicago	2008–09	Primera B Metropolitana	9	9	0	0	—		—		9	9
Nueva Chicago	Total		17	9	0	0	—		—		17	9
Peñarol	2009–10	Primera División	32	8	0	0	—		—		32	8
Peñarol	2010–11	Primera División	24	6	0	0	17 (Note: Four appearances and one goal in 2010 Copa Sudamericana, 13 appearances and two goals in 2011 Copa Libertadores.)	3	—		41	9
Peñarol	Total		56	14	0	0	17	3	—		73	17
Fluminense	2011	Série A	14	1	0	0	—		—		14	1
Fluminense	2012	Série A	0	0	0	0	—		1 (Note: Appearance(s) in Campeonato Carioca.)	0	1	0
Fluminense	2015	Série A	0	0	0	0	—		—		0	0
Fluminense	Total		14	1	0	0	—		1	0	15	1
Villarreal	2011–12	La Liga	13	1	2	0	—		—		13	1
Cruzeiro (loan)	2012	Série A	10	4	0	0	—		—		10	4
Cruzeiro (loan)	2013	Série A	7	0	2	0	—		—		9	0
Cruzeiro (loan)	2014	Série A	1	0	0	0	0	0	—		1	0
Cruzeiro (loan)	Total		18	4	2	0	0	0	—		20	4
Coritiba (loan)	2014	Série A	13	2	2	0	—		—		15	2
Chapecoense	2016	Série A	8	1	2	0	0	0	—		10	1
Chapecoense	2017	Série A	0	0	0	0	0	0	4 (Note: Appearance(s) in Campeonato Catarinense.)	0	4	0
Chapecoense	Total		8	1	0	0	0	0	4	0	14	1
Avaí	2018	Série A	1	0	2	0	—		14	2	17	2
Career total			140	32	8	0	17	3	5	0	184	37

== Honours ==
Peñarol

- Campeonato Uruguayo: 2009–10

Cruzeiro

- Campeonato Brasileiro Série A: 2013
- Campeonato Mineiro: 2014

== Chapecoense plane crash ==
On 28 November 2016, many of his current teammates at Chapecoense were involved in a plane crash, which killed most of the squad (17 died instantly after crash and two more a few hours later in hospital at Medellín). Martinuccio was not on the plane as he had been dropped from the team for the first leg of the against 2016 Copa Sudamericana Final against Atlético Nacional due to an injury.
