= Copa Paz del Chaco =

- Founded: 1957
- Region: South America (CONMEBOL)
- Teams: 2

The Copa Paz del Chaco (Spanish for Chaco Armistice Cup) is a football international friendly match between the Paraguayan and Bolivia national football teams, played since 1957.

== History ==
The trophy was instituted jointly by the Paraguayan Football Association and the Bolivian Football Federation. Its name is a tribute to the armistice that the two countries signed in 1935, after the bloody war that claimed since 1932. The dispute has been irregular, the rules state that they must do two regular meetings in each capital.

The trophy was at stake ten times, with Paraguay winning 7 times and Bolivia 3 times.

The 2003 edition was the only one that took place with players under 23 years.

The last game played was on June 20, 2008, at the Ramón Tahuichi Aguilera Stadium in the city of Santa Cruz de la Sierra, Bolivia, the game ended tied.

== Statistical summary ==
| Selección | PG | W | T | L | GF | GA | DIF |
|---|---|---|---|---|---|---|---|
| Paraguay | 23 | 9 | 8 | 6 | 36 | 26 | 10 |
| Bolivia | 23 | 6 | 8 | 9 | 26 | 36 | -10 |

PG=Played games; W=Won games; T=Tied games; L=Lost games; GF=Goals for; GA=Goals against; DIF=Goals differences
