= Juan Pablo Pereyra =

Argentine footballer

Personal information
- Full name: Juan Pablo Pereyra
- Date of birth: May 30, 1984 (age 42)
- Place of birth: San Lorenzo, Argentina
- Height: 1.93 m (6 ft 4 in)
- Positions: Left winger; striker

Senior career*
Years	Team	Apps	(Gls)
2006	El Linqueño	11	(2)
2006–2007	Tigre	17	(5)
2007–2008	Nacional	18	(3)
2008–2010	Atlético Tucumán	62	(6)
2010–2012	Estudiantes	17	(2)
2011–2012	→ Unión (loan)	13	(0)
2012–2013	Atlético Tucumán	12	(1)
2013–2014	Ferro Carril Oeste	14	(0)
2014	Almirante Brown	20	(2)
2014–2015	Mitre SdE	16	(1)
2015–2016	Independiente Rivadavia	35	(7)
2016	Colegiales	9	(3)
2017	Cipolletti	7	(0)
2017–2018	Central Córdoba (R)	35	(3)

International career
2010	Argentina	1	(0)
- * Club domestic league appearances and goals as of 01:45, 4 December 2019 (UTC)

Juan Pablo Pereyra (born 30 May 1984 in San Lorenzo) is an Argentine football midfielder or forward.

== Career ==
Pereyra made his playing debut in 2006 for El Linqueño in the regionalised 4th division of Argentine football. In 2006, he joined 2nd division side Tigre where he was part of the squad that won promotion to the Primera División in 2007.

Between 2007 and 2008 he played for Uruguayan side Nacional where he scored three goals in 18 league appearances.

In 2008, he returned to Argentine football, joining Atlético Tucumán of the 2nd division. He helped the team to win the 2008-09 championship and secure automatic promotion to the Primera División.

On July 17, 2010, Pereyra signed with Estudiantes de La Plata for a reported transfer fee of close to $500,000.

In July 2011, he signed a one-year loan deal with Unión de Santa Fe and on 16 August 2012, moved to his former club Atlético Tucumán on a free transfer.

== Honours ==
Atlético Tucumán

- Primera B Nacional: 2008–09

Estudiantes

- Argentine Primera División: 2010 Apertura
