= Víctor Guazá =

Colombian footballer (born 1985)

Personal information
- Full name: Víctor Alfonso Guazá Lucumí
- Date of birth: August 16, 1985 (age 41)
- Place of birth: Puerto Tejada, Colombia
- Height: 1.90 m (6 ft 3 in)
- Position: Forward

Youth career
- 2002–2007: Atlético Huila

Senior career*
Years	Team	Apps	(Gls)
2007	Atlético Huila		
2007–2008	Unión Atlético Maracaibo	18	(2)
2008–2010	Atlético Huila	64	(8)
2010–2011	Deportivo Petare	13	(3)
2011–2012	La Equidad	41	(3)
2012–2014	UT Cajamarca	33	(11)
2014	Zob Ahan	4	(0)
2015	Boyacá Chicó	7	(0)
2016	UT Cajamarca	30	(13)
2017	Carlos A. Mannucci	7	(0)
- * Club domestic league appearances and goals

Víctor Alfonso Guazá Lucumí (born August 16, 1985) is a Colombian retired footballer.

In 2016, he suffered a skull fracture, but made a full recovery and continued playing.

In 2017, he played in the Peruvian Second Division for Mannucci de Trujillo. After seven matches with the Trujillo team, he retired from playing football, at the age of 31, and became a youth football coach.
