= Nicolás Pavlovich =

Argentine footballer and coach

Personal information
- Date of birth: 14 February 1978 (age 48)
- Place of birth: Balcarce, Argentina
- Height: 1.87 m (6 ft 2 in)
- Position: Striker

Senior career*
Years	Team	Apps	(Gls)
1998–2002	Newell's Old Boys	61	(14)
1999–2000	→ Argentino Rosario (loan)	19	(4)
2002	Racing Club	17	(5)
2003–2005	Saturn	53	(9)
2006	1. FC Kaiserslautern	6	(0)
2007	Morelia	15	(1)
2007–2008	Banfield	26	(4)
2008–2010	Argentinos Juniors	55	(15)
2010–2011	Necaxa	11	(2)
2011	Libertad	22	(8)
2011–2012	Olimpo	17	(0)
2012	Deportivo Merlo	0	(0)
2013	La Serena	9	(2)

Managerial career
- 2018–2020: Vélez Sarsfield (assistant)
- 2021: Atlanta United (assistant)
- 2023: Newell's Old Boys (assistant)
- * Club domestic league appearances and goals

Nicolás Pavlovich (born 14 February 1978) is an Argentine football coach and a former striker. He has played professional football in Argentina, Russia, Germany and Mexico.

== Career ==
Pavlovich started his career with Newell's Old Boys in 1998, he joined Racing Club in 2002.

In 2003, Pavlovich was signed by Russian club FC Saturn where he played until 2005. He then had brief spells with Kaiserslautern in Germany and Morelia in Mexico before returning to Argentina in 2007 to play for Club Atlético Banfield.

In 2008, he joined Argentinos Juniors on a year-long loan, with an option to buy. He was an important member of the Argentinos Juniors team that won the Clausura 2010 championship, playing in 18 of the club's 19 games and scoring six goals during the championship winning campaign.

== Honours ==
Argentinos Juniors

- Argentine Primera División (1): Clausura 2010
