= Wallyson =

Brazilian footballer

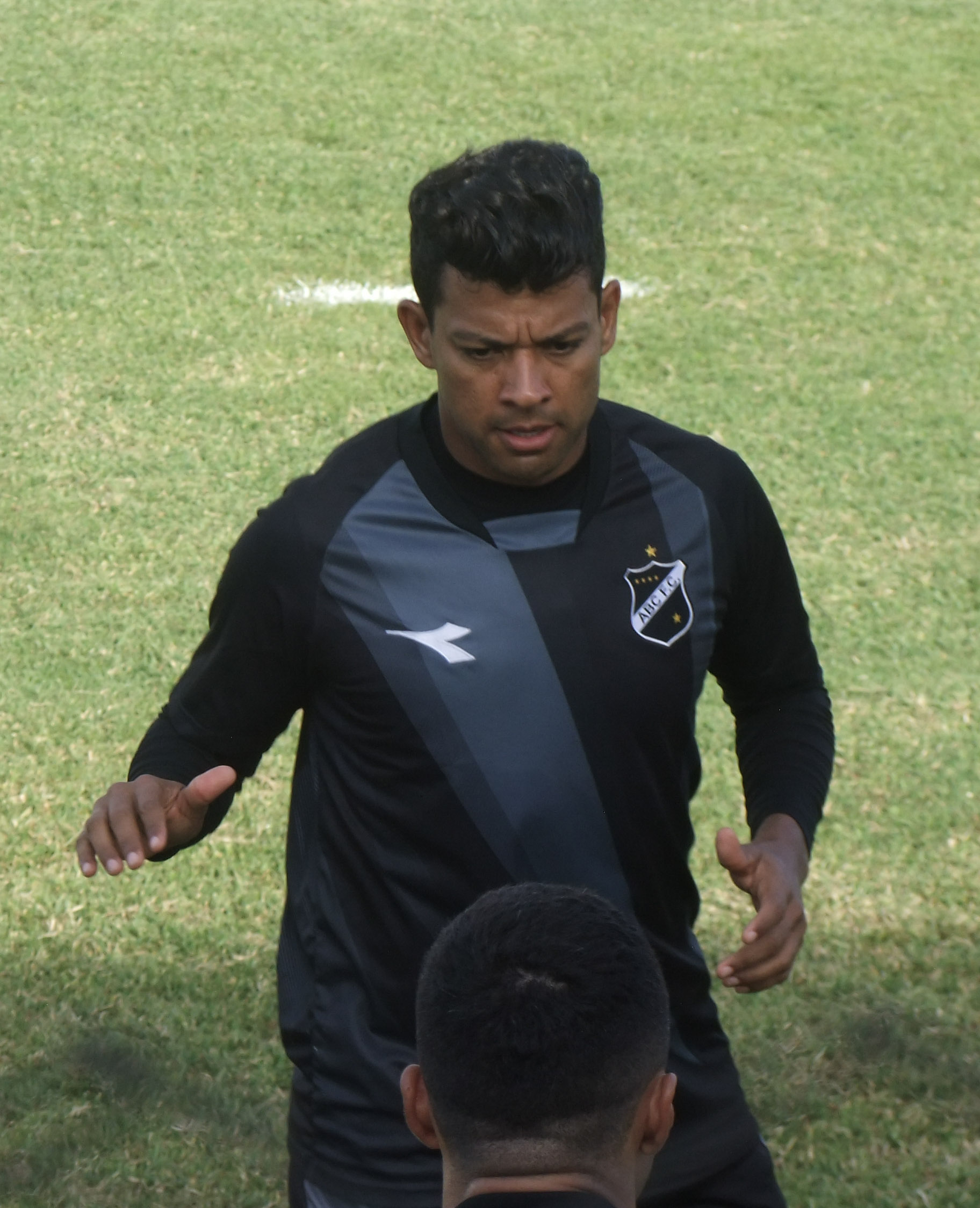

Personal information
- Full name: Wallyson Ricardo Maciel Monteiro
- Date of birth: 17 October 1988 (age 38)
- Place of birth: Macaíba, Brazil
- Height: 1.79 m (5 ft 10 in)
- Position: Forward

Team information
- Current team: ABC

Youth career
- 2003: São Gonçalo
- 2004: Potiguar

Senior career*
Years	Team	Apps	(Gls)
2005–2007	ABC	49	(26)
2007–2010	Atlético Paranaense	50	(11)
2010–2012	Cruzeiro	84	(27)
2013	São Paulo	0	(0)
2013	Bahia	25	(3)
2014	Botafogo	25	(4)
2015	Coritiba	2	(0)
2016	Santa Cruz	33	(2)
2017	Vila Nova	36	(7)
2018	ABC	16	(9)
2018	Vitória	19	(2)
2019	CRB	0	(0)
2019–	ABC	181	(59)
- * Club domestic league appearances and goals as of 18 November 2026

Wallyson Ricardo Maciel Monteiro (born 17 October 1988 in Macaíba), simply known as Wallyson, is a Brazilian footballer who plays as a forward for ABC.

== Career ==
=== ABC ===
Wallyson began his career at ABC, and quickly became the idol of his home crowd when, being only 19 years old, scored four goals in the Campeonato Potiguar final of 2007, against the team's biggest rival in Brazilian football, América, winning by 5–2. ABC won its 49th state league championship in its history and the player himself finished the tournament as top scorer that season. Wallyson was also a major contributor to ABC's promotion to Serie B (Brazil's national second division) making the tie-breaking goal in the last match of ABC in the competition against Bragantino, which ensured the team promotion. He was considered one of the main highlights of the Serie C. Due to his success, he was linked to Atlético Paranaense.

=== Atlético Paranaense ===
In 2008, he was traded to Atletico Paranaense. In this year, Wallyson made his debut in Serie A, however, he suffered with several injuries and failed to have a major impact in his first season with his new club. But in 2009, he won the Campeonato Paranaense, being elected the breakthrough player of this competition.

=== Cruzeiro ===
On July 29, 2010 the player was presented to Cruzeiro. He was signed from a proxy club Deportivo Maldonado on loan until 2013. Cruzeiro would receive 30% transfer fee if Wallyson was successfully sold. The team debut took place on August 22, in a loss to Vitória in a game for the Serie A. On 15 September he scored his first goal for the team in a victory over the Guarani, for 4–2. He played mostly as a substitute in his first year at Cruzeiro. In 2011, Wallyson was promoted to the first team, and finished as Cruzeiro's top scorer at Copa Santander Libertadores, with 7 goals. He scored two goals in the two final matches of the Campeonato Mineiro against biggest rivals Atlético Mineiro, which was his third State League title in career.

=== São Paulo ===
On January 11, 2013, São Paulo confirmed Wallyson had signed and was to join the squad. The player signed contract until December. In May 2013, however, after the elimination of Tricolor in State League and Libertadores Cup, the player was released, by president Juvenal Juvêncio and coach Ney Franco.

=== Botafogo ===
On January 22, 2014, Wallyson was signed by Botafogo. He remained at the club until the end of the season.

=== Coritiba ===
On March 6, 2015, Wallyson joined Coritiba.

=== CRB ===
On 1 February 2019, Wallyson signed for Clube de Regatas Brasil.

=== ABC ===
At the end of May 2019, he returned to ABC.

== Honours ==
ABC

- Campeonato Potiguar: 2007

Atlético Paranaense

- Campeonato Paranaense: 2009

Cruzeiro

- Campeonato Mineiro: 2011

=== Individual ===
- Campeonato Potiguar Top Scorer: 2007
- Campeonato Paranaense Breakthrough Player: 2009
- Copa Santander Libertadores Top Scorer: 2011
