= Roberto Nanni =

Argentine footballer

Personal information
- Full name: Roberto Antonio Nanni
- Date of birth: 20 August 1981 (age 45)
- Place of birth: Azul, Buenos Aires, Argentina
- Height: 1.89 m (6 ft 2 in)
- Position: Centre forward

Team information
- Current team: Sportivo Ameliano (manager)

Youth career
- Alumni Azuleño
- Vélez Sarsfield

Senior career*
Years	Team	Apps	(Gls)
2001–2003	Vélez Sársfield	68	(35)
2003–2007	Dynamo Kyiv	1	(1)
2003–2004	→ Dynamo-2 Kyiv	10	(6)
2004–2005	→ UD Almería (loan)	12	(5)
2005	→ Siena (loan)	8	(0)
2006	→ Messina (loan)	9	(1)
2006–2007	→ Crotone (loan)	6	(1)
2008–2009	Vélez Sársfield	20	(1)
2009–2013	Cerro Porteño	100	(39)
2013	Atlante	9	(3)
2014–2016	Vélez Sársfield	24	(2)
2016	Cúcuta Deportivo	8	(0)
2016–2017	Club Nacional	14	(3)

Managerial career
- 2022–2025: Vélez Sarsfield (youth)
- 2025–: Sportivo Ameliano
- * Club domestic league appearances and goals

Roberto Antonio Nanni (born 20 August 1981) is an Argentine football manager and former player who played as a forward. He is the current manager of Paraguayan club Sportivo Ameliano.

== Club career ==
Nanni started playing professionally for Vélez Sársfield in 2001. While at the team, he reached the final fixture of the 2003 Clausura as the league's top scorer with 15 goals, 3 more than Rosario Central's Luciano Figueroa. However, Figueroa scored 5 goals in his team's 7–2 victory over Boca Juniors, that played the game with a youth squad, frustrating Nanni's possibility of becoming the league's top scorer. During that tournament, in which Vélez finished third under Carlos Ischia's coaching, Nanni scored the only goal of the 1–0 victory over River Plate, ending a 12-year period without victories for the team in the Estadio Monumental Antonio Vespucio Liberti.

On 29 August 2003, the Argentine forward was signed by FC Dynamo Kyiv for the club's record fee –at that time– of around €5 million. While in Dynamo Kyiv, he hardly play for the senior squad, participating only in reserve competitions. In October 2004 he was loaned to UD Almería in Spain, starting a loan span that took him to Siena in July 2005, Messina in January 2006 and lastly Crotone in August 2006 (all in Italy). In January 2008 he was released by Dynamo and rejoined Vélez.

Upon his return, the striker won with his team the 2009 Clausura, scoring one goal in the second game, against Argentinos Juniors. Nanni played 11 games during the tournament, mostly coming on as a substitute.

In July 2009, at the request of coach Pedro Troglio, he joined Paraguayan champions Cerro Porteño, on a free transfer. The striker helped his team reach the semifinals of both the 2009 Copa Sudamericana and the 2011 Copa Libertadores (being the joint top scorer in the latter, with 7 goals). Nanni also won with Cerro Porteño the 2012 Apertura and was the joint top scorer of the 2010 Clausura. After five years playing for Cerro Porteño, the Argentine forward had a fight with the club's president, Juan José Zapag and his contract was terminated. With 59 goals in all competitions, Nanni is the 5th top goal scorer in the history of Cerro Porteño.

After Cerro Porteño, the forward joined Atlante F.C., where he played for six months in 2013. In February 2014, Nanni joined Vélez Sarsfield on a free transfer for his third spell with the club, signing for one year.

== Honours ==
=== Club ===
Vélez Sársfield

- Argentine Primera División (1): 2009 Clausura

Cerro Porteño

- Paraguayan Primera División (1): 2012 Apertura

=== Individual ===
- Paraguayan Primera División top scorer (1): 2010 Clausura (with Cerro Porteño)
- Copa Libertadores top scorer (1): 2011 (with Cerro Porteño)
