= Juan Manuel Olivera =

Uruguayan footballer (born 1981)

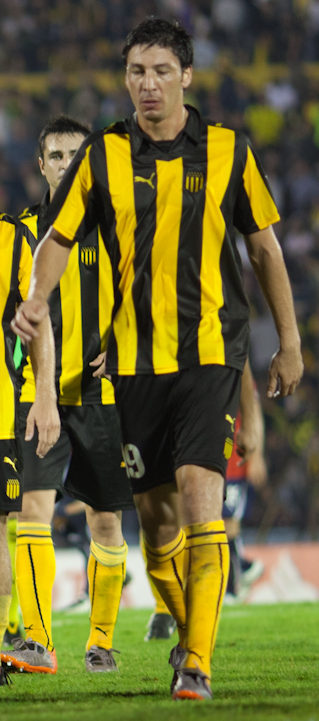
- Olivera with Peñarol in 2011

Personal information
- Full name: Juan Manuel Olivera López
- Date of birth: 14 August 1981 (age 45)
- Place of birth: Montevideo, Uruguay
- Height: 1.91 m (6 ft 3 in)
- Position: Striker

Youth career
- Danubio

Senior career*
Years	Team	Apps	(Gls)
2001–2004	Danubio	109	(39)
2004	→ San Lorenzo (loan)	13	(5)
2005	Cruz Azul	2	(2)
2005	→ U. de Chile (loan)	21	(9)
2006	Danubio	18	(1)
2006	Suwon Bluewings	14	(7)
2007	Shaanxi Baorong	21	(3)
2008	Libertad	23	(5)
2009–2010	Universidad de Chile	42	(37)
2010	Al-Shabab	9	(4)
2011	Peñarol	11	(5)
2011–2012	Al Wasl	20	(13)
2012–2015	Peñarol	38	(19)
2013	→ Náutico (loan)	21	(2)
2014	→ Estudiantes LP (loan)	13	(2)
2015–2017	Danubio	57	(18)
2017–2021	River Plate Montevideo	86	(18)
2021	Danubio	15	(1)
Total		533	(190)

Managerial career
- 2022–2023: Peñarol (youth)
- 2023: Peñarol (interim)
- 2023: Peñarol (interim)
- 2025: Danubio
- * Club domestic league appearances and goals

Juan Manuel Olivera López (born 14 August 1981) is a Uruguayan former professional footballer who played as a centre-forward.

During a career spanning two decades, he played in Uruguay, Argentina, Mexico, South Korea, China, Chile, Saudi Arabia, the United Arab Emirates, Brazil and Paraguay. He is particularly associated with Danubio and Peñarol in Uruguay and Universidad de Chile in Chile.

== Club career ==
Olivera began his professional career with Danubio in 2001. His performances in Uruguay led to a move to Argentine club San Lorenzo in 2004, followed by spells abroad with Mexico's Cruz Azul, South Korean club Suwon Samsung Bluewings and Chinese side Shaanxi Chanba.

He returned to Uruguay to play for Danubio and later joined Paraguayan club Libertad. In 2008, Olivera signed for Peñarol, where he enjoyed a prolific spell, scoring 17 goals during the 2008–09 Uruguayan Primera División season.

In July 2009, Olivera moved to Chile and signed a three-year contract with Universidad de Chile, which had recently won the Apertura championship. He made an immediate impact, scoring on his league debut in a 3–1 victory over Cobresal. He also scored twice against Deportivo Cali in the 2009 Copa Sudamericana, helping Universidad de Chile advance to the round of 16.

Olivera remained one of Universidad de Chile's principal attacking players during 2010. In the 2010 Copa Libertadores, he scored against Caracas in the group stage, and later played a decisive role in the quarter-final against Flamengo. In the first leg at the Maracanã, Olivera scored Universidad de Chile's third goal in a 3–2 away victory. In the return match in Santiago, he scored from long range in a 2–1 defeat, a goal that proved decisive as Universidad de Chile advanced on away goals to its first Copa Libertadores semi-final since 1996.

His performances attracted interest from clubs abroad, and in June 2010 Universidad de Chile agreed to transfer him to Saudi Arabian side Al-Shabab. He later played for Al-Wasl in the United Arab Emirates before returning to Peñarol in 2012.

Olivera returned to Chile in 2013 to join Náutico Capibaribe in Brazil before signing for Peñarol again. He subsequently had another spell abroad with Paraguayan club Olimpia.

In 2015, Olivera returned to Danubio, beginning the final and longest continuous spell of his career. He remained with the club until 2017, then spent the 2017 season with River Plate Montevideo before rejoining Danubio in 2018. In October 2019, he scored the 100th goal of his Uruguayan Primera División career in a match against Nacional.

Olivera played his final professional match for Danubio in December 2021 and retired at the age of 40. He ended his career with 557 official appearances and 219 goals, according to figures published at the time of his retirement.

== Honours ==
=== Player ===
Universidad de Chile

- Primera División de Chile (1): 2009 Apertura

=== Manager ===
Peñarol U20

- Under-20 Intercontinental Cup: runner up: 2022
