= Sergio Pezzotta =

Argentine football referee (born 1967)

Sergio Fabián Pezzotta
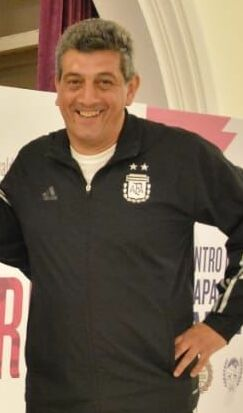
- Full name: Sergio Fabián Pezzotta
- Born: 28 November 1967 (age 58); Rosario, Santa Fe, Argentina

Domestic
Years	League	Role
1999–2014	Argentine Primera División	Referee

International
Years	League	Role
2000–2012	FIFA listed	Referee

Sergio Fabián Pezzotta (born 28 November 1967 in Rosario, Santa Fe) is an Argentine football referee.

He has been a referee in domestic Primera División since 1999 and an International FIFA referee since 2000.

After the retirement of fellow countryman Horacio Elizondo he became Argentine's top referee and was selected for the 2007 Copa América where he took charge of three games (Brazil vs Mexico, Brazil vs Ecuador; both group stage and the quarterfinal between Mexico and Paraguay).

Injury kept him out from the preliminary tests for 2010 FIFA World Cup where Héctor Baldassi had been chosen instead to represent Argentine FA.

Pezzotta returned to full fitness in 2011 and was selected for his second Copa America; held in home his country.

Earlier in 2011 he took charge of the second leg of the Copa Libertadores final where Santos defeated Peñarol to claim the trophy.
