= Antonio Pedroza =

English-Mexican footballer (born 1991)

Personal information
- Full name: Antonio Michael Pedroza Whitham
- Date of birth: 20 February 1991 (age 35)
- Place of birth: Chester, England

Senior career*
Years	Team	Apps	(Gls)
2007–2011	Chiapas	18	(3)
2011–2012	Crystal Palace	4	(0)
2012–2013	→ Morelia (loan)	8	(1)
2013–2015	Cruz Azul Hidalgo	19	(2)
2014–2015	→ Herediano (loan)	19	(5)
2015	Cruz Azul	4	(0)
2016	→ Herediano (loan)	21	(4)
2016–2017	Toluca	3	(0)
2018	Olmedo	0	(0)
2018–2019	Herediano	21	(1)
2019	Mineros de Zacatecas	4	(0)
2021	Chapulineros de Oaxaca	0	(0)
- * Club domestic league appearances and goals

Antonio Michael Pedroza Whitham (born 20 February 1991) is an English-Mexican professional footballer who plays as a forward.

== Early life ==
Antonio Pedroza was born in Chester, England to a Mexican father and an English mother. At the age of two years, he was brought to Miguel Auza, a municipality located in the Mexican state of Zacatecas.

Prior to starting his career, he spent short trial periods with various clubs in Europe such as Premier League clubs Fulham and Arsenal, as well as Spanish La Liga club Atletico de Madrid.

== Club career ==
=== Mexico ===
Pedroza made his league debut with Jaguares on 24 July 2010 against Necaxa, coming in as a substitute after 45 minutes.

=== England ===
In 2011, there were rumours that Pedroza could potentially join the English club Tottenham Hotspur, However, negotiations for Pedroza eventually fell through and he was left without a club because the Mexican draft had expired meaning he could not re-sign with Jaguares for the 2011–12 season.

He eventually joined south London side Crystal Palace for whom he signed a three-year contract. However, he barely saw action with the Eagles' first team in the 2011–12 season.

=== Return to Mexico ===
Pedroza decided to return to Mexico on a loan with Morelia. After his loan ended he left Palace and England and signed for Liga de Ascenso side Cruz Azul Hidalgo.

In July 2014 he signed with C.S. Herediano of the Costa Rican Primera División on a six-month loan. He was presented to media by the club the next month on 7 August.

=== Ecuador ===
In January 2018, Pedroza joined C.D. Olmedo of the Ecuadorian second tier.

== Career statistics ==
=== Club ===
Statistics accurate as of 30 June 2013

Club	Season	League		Cup		Continental		Other		Total	
Club	Season	Apps	Goals	Apps	Goals	Apps	Goals	Apps	Goals	Apps	Goals
Chiapas	2010–11	12	0	0	0	6	3	0	0	18	3
Crystal Palace	2011–12	4	0	1	0	0	0	0	0	5	0
Morelia	2012–13	8	1	3	4	0	0	0	0	11	5
Cruz Azul Hidalgo	2013–14	19	2	6	1	0	0	0	0	25	3
Herediano	2014	19	5	0	0	3	0	0	0	22	5
Career total		62	8	10	5	9	3	0	0	82	17

== Honours ==
Cruz Azul

- CONCACAF Champions League: 2013–14

Herediano

- Liga FPD: Clausura 2016, Apertura 2018
- CONCACAF League: 2018
