= 2010–11 in Argentine football =

Football in Argentina
- Season: 2010–11

2010–11 season of Argentine football is the 120th season of competitive football in Argentina.

== National leagues ==
=== Men's ===
==== Primera División ====
- Apertura champion: Estudiantes de La Plata (5th title)
  - Top scorer: Santiago Silva, Denis Stracqualursi (11 goals each)
- Clausura champion: Vélez Sársfield (8th title)
  - Top scorer: Javier Cámpora, Teófilo Gutiérrez (11 goals each)
- International qualifiers:
  - 2011 Copa Libertadores: Estudiantes de La Plata, Vélez Sársfield, Godoy Cruz, Argentinos Juniors, Independiente
  - 2012 Copa Libertadores: Vélez Sársfield
  - 2011 Copa Sudamericana: Independiente, Vélez Sársfield, Estudiantes de La Plata, Godoy Cruz, Lanús, Arsenal, Argentinos Juniors
- Relegated: Gimnasia (La Plata), Huracán, Quilmes, River Plate

Source: RSSSF

==== Primera B Nacional ====
- Champion: Atlético de Rafaela (2nd title)
  - Top scorer: César Carignano (21 goals)
- Promoted: Atlético de Rafaela, Unión de Santa Fe, San Martín de San Juan, Belgrano
- Relegated: C.A.I., Tiro Federal, San Martín (Tucumán)

Source: RSSSF

==== Primera B Metropolitana ====
- Champion: Atlanta (2nd title)
  - Top scorer: Leonardo Romero, Javier Grbec (19 goals each)
- Promoted: Atlanta
- Relegated: Deportivo Español

Source: RSSSF

==== Torneo Argentino A ====
- Champion: Guillermo Brown (1st title)
  - Top scorer: Gonzalo Klusener
- Promoted: Guillermo Brown and Desamparados
- Relegated: Villa Mitre, 9 de Julio (Rafaela) and Estudiantes (Río Cuarto)

Source: RSSSF

==== Primera C Metropolitana ====
- Champion: General Lamadrid
  - Top scorer: Ezequiel Petrovelli (20 goals)
- Promoted: General Lamadrid
- Relegated: Fénix

Source: RSSSF

==== Torneo Argentino B ====
- Promoted: Gimnasia y Tiro and Racing de Olavarría
- Relegated: Independiente de Neuquén, Juventud de Pergamino, Argentino de 25 de Mayo and Atlético Famaillá

Source: RSSSF

==== Primera D Metropolitana ====
- Champion: Dock Sud
  - Top scorer: Lionel Fonzalida (22 goals)
- Promoted: Dock Sud
- Relegated: Puerto Nuevo

Source: RSSSF

==== Torneo Argentino C ====
- Promoted: Huracán Las Heras, Once Tigres, General San Martín de Formosa and Jorge Newbery de Venado Tuerto

=== Women's ===
==== Campeonato de Fútbol Femenino ====
- Apertura champion: Boca Juniors (18th title).
- Clausura champion: Boca Juniors (19th title).
- International qualifier:
  - 2011 Copa Libertadores de Fútbol Femenino: Boca Juniors.

Source: RSSSF

== Clubs in international competitions ==
=== Men's summary ===
Team / Competition	2010 Recopa Sudamericana	2010 Copa Sudamericana	2011 Copa Libertadores
Argentinos Juniors	did not qualify	Second stage	Second stage
Banfield	did not qualify	Round of 16	did not qualify
Estudiantes de La Plata	Runner up	Second stage	Round of 16
Godoy Cruz	did not qualify	did not qualify	Second stage
Independiente	did not qualify	Champions	Second stage
Newell's Old Boys	did not qualify	Quarterfinals	did not qualify
Vélez Sársfield	did not qualify	Second stage	Semifinals

==== Argentinos Juniors ====
2010 Copa Sudamericana

August 26, 2010 Second stage	Independiente (Argentina)	1–0	(Argentina) Argentinos Juniors	Avellaneda, Argentina
21:15 (UTC-3)	Galeano 9'	Report		Stadium: Estadio Libertadores de América; Referee: Sergio Pezzotta (Argentina)

September 9, 2010 Second stage	Argentinos Juniors (Argentina)	1–1	(Argentina) Independiente	Buenos Aires, Argentina
19:30 (UTC-3)	Ortigoza 34' (pen.)	Report	Gracián 66'	Stadium: Estadio Diego Armando Maradona; Referee: Néstor Pitana (Argentina)

Argentinos Juniors eliminated by Independiente on points 1–4.

2011 Copa Libertadores

February 9, 2011 Second stage	Fluminense (Brazil)	2–2	(Argentina) Argentinos Juniors	Rio de Janeiro, Brazil
22:00 UTC−02:00	Moura 58', 74'	Report	Niell 44', 70'	Stadium: Estádio Olímpico João Havelange (Engenhão); Attendance: 15,939; Referee: Carlos Torres (Paraguay)

February 24, 2011 Second stage	Argentinos Juniors (Argentina)	3–1	(Mexico) América	Buenos Aires, Argentina
21:30 UTC−03:00	Salcedo 45' (pen.), 73'; Sánchez Prette 90+3'	Report	Montenegro 27'	Stadium: Estadio Diego Armando Maradona; Referee: Víctor Hugo Carrillo (Peru)

March 2, 2011 Second stage	Nacional (Uruguay)	0–1	(Argentina) Argentinos Juniors	Montevideo, Uruguay
20:30 UTC−02:00		Report	Niell 21'	Stadium: Estadio Gran Parque Central; Referee: Antonio Arias (Paraguay)

March 15, 2011 Second stage	Argentinos Juniors (Argentina)	0–1	(Uruguay) Nacional	Buenos Aires, Argentina
19:15 UTC−03:00		Report	García 34'	Stadium: Estadio Diego Armando Maradona; Referee: Enrique Osses (Chile)

April 6, 2011 Second stage	América (Mexico)	2–1	(Argentina) Argentinos Juniors	Mexico City, Mexico
21:50 UTC−05:00	Vuoso 73'; Márquez 82'	Report	Niell 49'	Stadium: Estadio Azteca; Referee: Carlos Amarilla (Paraguay)

April 20, 2011 Second stage	Argentinos Juniors (Argentina)	2–4	(Brazil) Fluminense	Buenos Aires, Argentina
21:50 UTC−03:00	Salcedo 26' (pen.); Oberman 54'	Report	Júlio César 18'; Fred 40', 89' (pen.); Moura 68'	Stadium: Estadio Diego Armando Maradona; Referee: Wilmar Roldán (Colombia)

Argentinos Juniors eliminated by finishing in 4th place in their group.

==== Banfield ====
2010 Copa Sudamericana

September 2, 2010 Second stage	Vélez Sársfield (Argentina)	0–1	(Argentina) Banfield	Buenos Aires, Argentina
19:45 (UTC-3)		Report	García 30'	Stadium: Estadio José Amalfitani; Referee: Néstor Pitana (Argentina)

September 15, 2010 Second stage	Banfield (Argentina)	1–1	(Argentina) Vélez Sársfield	Buenos Aires, Argentina
20:30 (UTC-3)	Carrusca 15'	Report	Cristaldo 90'	Stadium: Estadio Florencio Sola; Referee: Saúl Laverni (Argentina)

September 29, 2010 Round of 16	Banfield (Argentina)	2–0	(Colombia) Deportes Tolima	Buenos Aires, Argentina
21:15 (UTC-3)	V. López 14'; Zelaya 25'	Report		Stadium: Estadio Florencio Sola; Referee: Salvio Fagundes (Brazil)

October 12, 2010 Round of 16	Deportes Tolima (Colombia)	3–0	(Argentina) Banfield	Ibagué, Colombia
20:30 (UTC-5)	Medina 12'; Marrugo 41'; Marangoni 74'	Report		Stadium: Estadio Manuel Murillo Toro; Referee: Roberto Silvera (Uruguay)

Banfield eliminated by Deportes Tolima on goal difference 2–3.

==== Estudiantes de La Plata ====
2010 Recopa Sudamericana

August 25, 2010 Finals	LDU Quito (Ecuador)	2–1	(Argentina) Estudiantes de La Plata	Quito, Ecuador
20:15 (UTC-5)	Barcos 8', 17'	Report	Rojo 12'	Stadium: Estadio Casa Blanca; Referee: Roberto Silvera (Uruguay)

September 8, 2010 Finals	Estudiantes de La Plata (Argentina)	0–0	(Ecuador) LDU Quito	Quilmes, Argentina
21:15 (UTC-3)		Report		Stadium: Estadio Centenario Dr. José Luis Meiszner; Referee: Carlos Simon (Brazil)

Estudiantes de La Plata defeated by LDU Quito on points 1–4.

2010 Copa Sudamericana

September 16, 2010 Second stage	Newell's Old Boys (Argentina)	1–0	(Argentina) Estudiantes de La Plata	Rosario, Argentina
19:00 (UTC-3)	Formica 90+3' (pen.)	Report		Stadium: Estadio Marcelo Bielsa; Referee: Diego Abal (Argentina)

September 22, 2010 Second stage	Estudiantes de La Plata (Argentina)	1–1	(Argentina) Newell's Old Boys	Quilmes, Argentina
21:15 (UTC-3)	F. Fernández 12'	Report	Borghello 43'	Stadium: Estadio Centenario Dr. José Luis Meiszner; Referee: Juan Pablo Pompei (Argentina)

Estudiantes de La Plata eliminated by Newell's Old Boys on points 1–4.

2011 Copa Libertadores

February 16, 2011 Second stage	Cruzeiro (Brazil)	5–0	(Argentina) Estudiantes de La Plata	Sete Lagoas, Brazil
22:00 UTC−02:00	Wallyson 1', 82'; Roger 18'; Montillo 39', 59'	Report		Stadium: Estádio Joaquim Henrique Nogueira (Arena do Jacaré); Referee: Carlos Amarilla (Paraguay)

February 23, 2011 Second stage	Estudiantes de La Plata (Argentina)	1–0	(Colombia) Deportes Tolima	La Plata, Argentina
21:50 UTC−03:00	Barrientos 45'	Report		Stadium: Estadio Ciudad de La Plata; Referee: Darío Ubriaco (Uruguay)

March 9, 2011 Second stage	Guaraní (Paraguay)	1–2	(Argentina) Estudiantes de La Plata	Asunción, Paraguay
21:45 UTC−03:00	Caballero 44' (pen.)	Report	Barrientos 51'; L. González 53'	Stadium: Estadio Defensores del Chaco, Asunción; Referee: Víctor Hugo Carrillo (Peru)

March 17, 2011 Second stage	Estudiantes de La Plata (Argentina)	5–1	(Paraguay) Guaraní	La Plata, Argentina
19:00 UTC−03:00	López 2', 19', 59'; L. González 25', 82'	Report	Ju. Benítez 79'	Stadium: Estadio Ciudad de La Plata; Referee: Martín Vázquez (Uruguay)

March 30, 2011 Second stage	Deportes Tolima (Colombia)	1–1	(Argentina) Estudiantes de La Plata	Ibagué, Colombia
17:30 UTC−05:00	Noguera 31' (pen.)	Report	F. Fernández 23'	Stadium: Estadio Manuel Murillo Toro; Referee: Víctor Rivera (Peru)

April 13, 2011 Second stage	Estudiantes de La Plata (Argentina)	0–3	(Brazil) Cruzeiro	La Plata, Argentina
21:50 UTC−03:00		Report	Ribeiro 11'; Wallyson 45+1'; Gilberto 82'	Stadium: Estadio Ciudad de La Plata; Referee: Roberto Silvera (Uruguay)

April 27, 2011 Round of 16	Estudiantes de La Plata (Argentina)	0–0	(Paraguay) Cerro Porteño	La Plata, Argentina
19:30 UTC−03:00		Report		Stadium: Estadio Ciudad de La Plata; Referee: Salvio Fagundes (Brazil)

May 5, 2011	Cerro Porteño (Paraguay)	0–0 (5–3 p)	(Argentina) Estudiantes de La Plata	Asunción, Paraguay
19:15 UTC−04:00		Report		Stadium: Estadio General Pablo Rojas; Referee: Óscar Ruiz (Colombia)
	Penalties
	dos Santos (penalty scored); Fabbro (penalty scored); Nanni (penalty scored); Cáceres (penalty scored); Villarreal (penalty scored)		(penalty scored) L. Benítez; (penalty scored) López; (penalty scored) Pereyra; (penalty missed) Roncaglia

Estudiantes de La Plata eliminated by Cerro Porteño on penalties.

==== Godoy Cruz ====
2011 Copa Libertadores

February 17, 2011 Second stage	Godoy Cruz (Argentina)	2–1	(Ecuador) LDU Quito	Mendoza, Argentina
22:15 UTC−03:00	C. Sánchez 17'; N. Sánchez 60'	Report	Reasco 53'	Stadium: Estadio Malvinas Argentinas; Referee: Martín Vázquez (Uruguay)

March 1, 2011 Second stage	Godoy Cruz (Argentina)	1–3	(Uruguay) Peñarol	Mendoza, Argentina
20:15 UTC−03:00	Ramírez 31'	Report	Olivera 1', 42'; Aguiar 67'	Stadium: Estadio Malvinas Argentinas; Referee: Paulo Oliveira (Brazil)

March 10, 2011 Second stage	Independiente (Argentina)	1–3	(Argentina) Godoy Cruz	Avellaneda, Argentina
21:45 UTC−03:00	Parra 16'	Report	Fredes 28' (o.g.); Rojas 32'; Ramírez 56'	Stadium: Estadio Libertadores de América; Referee: Patricio Loustau (Argentina)

March 23, 2011 Second stage	Godoy Cruz (Argentina)	1–1	(Argentina) Independiente	Mendoza, Argentina
19:30 UTC−03:00	Ramírez 34'	Report	Defederico 1'	Stadium: Estadio Malvinas Argentinas; Referee: Héctor Baldassi (Argentina)

March 31, 2011 Second stage	Peñarol (Uruguay)	2–1	(Argentina) Godoy Cruz	Montevideo, Uruguay
21:45 UTC−03:00	Olivera 42'; Freitas 71'	Report	D. Rodríguez 57' (o.g.)	Stadium: Estadio Centenario; Referee: Héber Roberto Lopes (Brazil)

April 12, 2011 Second stage	LDU Quito (Ecuador)	2–0	(Argentina) Godoy Cruz	Quito, Ecuador
17:15 UTC−05:00	Bolaños 48'; Barcos 59'	Report		Stadium: Estadio Casa Blanca; Referee: Paulo Oliveira (Brazil)

Godoy Cruz eliminated by finishing in 4th place in their group.

==== Independiente ====
2010 Copa Sudamericana

August 26, 2010 Second stage	Independiente (Argentina)	1–0	(Argentina) Argentinos Juniors	Avellaneda, Argentina
21:15 (UTC-3)	Galeano 9'	Report		Stadium: Estadio Libertadores de América; Referee: Sergio Pezzotta (Argentina)

September 9, 2010 Second stage	Argentinos Juniors (Argentina)	1–1	(Argentina) Independiente	Buenos Aires, Argentina
19:30 (UTC-3)	Ortigoza 34' (pen.)	Report	Gracián 66'	Stadium: Estadio Diego Armando Maradona; Referee: Néstor Pitana (Argentina)

September 28, 2010 Round of 16	Defensor Sporting (Uruguay)	1–0	(Argentina) Independiente	Montevideo, Uruguay
21:15 (UTC-3)	Gracián 65' (o.g.)	Report		Stadium: Estadio Centenario; Referee: Carlos Torres (Paraguay)

October 19, 2010 Round of 16	Independiente (Argentina)	4–2	(Uruguay) Defensor Sporting	Avellaneda, Argentina
19:20 (UTC-3)	Silvera 15'; Fredes 19'; Cabrera 28'; Martínez 75'	Report	Mora 12'; Rodríguez 48'	Stadium: Estadio Libertadores de América; Referee: Wilson Seneme (Brazil)

November 3, 2010 Quarterfinals	Deportes Tolima (Colombia)	2–2	(Argentina) Independiente	Ibagué, Colombia
19:15 (UTC-5)	Medina 40'; Marangoni 73'	Report	Silvera 30' (pen.); J. Velázquez 78'	Stadium: Estadio Manuel Murillo Toro; Referee: Carlos Simon (Brazil)

November 11, 2010 Quarterfinals	Independiente (Argentina)	0–0	(Colombia) Deportes Tolima	Avellaneda, Argentina
21:30 (UTC-3)		Report		Stadium: Estadio Presidente Juan Domingo Perón; Referee: Carlos Amarilla (Paraguay)

November 18, 2010 Semifinals	LDU Quito (Ecuador)	3–2	(Argentina) Independiente	Quito, Ecuador
19:30 (UTC-5)	Salgueiro 45'; Bolaños 49'; Reasco 57'	Report	Silvera 58'; Mareque 64'	Stadium: Estadio Casa Blanca; Referee: Roberto Silvera (Uruguay)

November 25, 2010 Semifinals	Independiente (Argentina)	2–1	(Ecuador) LDU Quito	Avellaneda, Argentina
21:30 (UTC-3)	Parra 27'; Fredes 46'	Report	Salgueiro 45+1'	Stadium: Estadio Libertadores de América; Referee: Enrique Osses (Chile)

December 1, 2010 Finals	Goiás (Brazil)	2–0	(Argentina) Independiente	Goiânia, Brazil
22:00 (UTC-2)	Rafael Moura 14'; Otacílio Neto 22'	Report		Stadium: Estádio do Governo do Estado de Goiás (Serra Dourada); Referee: Carlos Torres (Paraguay)

December 8, 2010 Finals	Independiente (Argentina)	3–1 (a.e.t.) (5–3 p)	(Brazil) Goiás	Avellaneda, Argentina
21:00 (UTC-3)	J. Velázquez 19'; Parra 27', 34'	Report	Rafael Moura 22'	Stadium: Estadio Libertadores de América; Referee: Óscar Ruiz (Colombia)
	Penalties
	M. Velázquez (penalty scored); Parra (penalty scored); Gracián (penalty scored); Matheu (penalty scored); Tuzzio (penalty scored)		(penalty scored) Toloi; (penalty scored) Éverton Santos; (penalty missed) Felipe; (penalty scored) Rafael Moura

Independiente defeated Goiás on penalties and won their first Copa Sudamericana.

2011 Copa Libertadores

January 25, 2011 First Stage	Independiente (Argentina)	2–0	(Ecuador) Deportivo Quito	Avellaneda, Argentina
21:15 UTC−03:00	Defederico 50'; Rodríguez 71'	Report		Stadium: Estadio Libertadores de América; Referee: Heber Lopes (Brazil)

February 1, 2011 First Stage	Deportivo Quito (Ecuador)	1–0	(Argentina) Independiente	Quito, Ecuador
19:45 UTC−05:00	Quiñónez 57'	Report		Stadium: Estadio Olímpico Atahualpa; Referee: Jorge Larrionda (Uruguay)

February 24, 2011 Second stage	Independiente (Argentina)	3–0	(Uruguay) Peñarol	Avellaneda, Argentina
19:15 UTC−03:00	Parra 47'; Pellerano 70'; Silvera 85'	Report		Stadium: Estadio Libertadores de América; Referee: Salvio Fagundes (Brazil)

March 3, 2011 Second stage	LDU Quito (Ecuador)	3–0	(Argentina) Independiente	Quito, Ecuador
20:30 UTC−05:00	Ambrosi 11'; Bolaños 52'; Urrutia 79'	Report		Stadium: Estadio Casa Blanca; Referee: Óscar Ruiz (Colombia)

March 10, 2011 Second stage	Independiente (Argentina)	1–3	(Argentina) Godoy Cruz	Avellaneda, Argentina
21:45 UTC−03:00	Parra 16'	Report	Fredes 28' (o.g.); Rojas 32'; Ramírez 56'	Stadium: Estadio Libertadores de América; Referee: Patricio Loustau (Argentina)

March 23, 2011 Second stage	Godoy Cruz (Argentina)	1–1	(Argentina) Independiente	Mendoza, Argentina
19:30 UTC−03:00	Ramírez 34'	Report	Defederico 1'	Stadium: Estadio Malvinas Argentinas; Referee: Héctor Baldassi (Argentina)

April 5, 2011 Second stage	Independiente (Argentina)	1–1	(Ecuador) LDU Quito	Avellaneda, Argentina
19:45 UTC−03:00	Núñez 24'	Report	Barcos 58'	Stadium: Estadio Libertadores de América; Referee: Carlos Torres (Paraguay)

April 12, 2011 Second stage	Peñarol (Uruguay)	0–1	(Argentina) Independiente	Montevideo, Uruguay
19:15 UTC−03:00		Report	Parra 34'	Stadium: Estadio Centenario; Referee: Antonio Arias (Paraguay)

Independiente eliminated by finishing in 3rd place in their group.

==== Newell's Old Boys ====
2010 Copa Sudamericana

September 16, 2010 Second stage	Newell's Old Boys (Argentina)	1–0	(Argentina) Estudiantes de La Plata	Rosario, Argentina
19:00 (UTC-3)	Formica 90+3' (pen.)	Report		Stadium: Estadio Marcelo Bielsa; Referee: Diego Abal (Argentina)

September 22, 2010 Second stage	Estudiantes de La Plata (Argentina)	1–1	(Argentina) Newell's Old Boys	Quilmes, Argentina
21:15 (UTC-3)	Fernández 12'	Report	Borghello 43'	Stadium: Estadio Centenario Dr. José Luis Meiszner; Referee: Juan Pablo Pompei (Argentina)

October 6, 2010 Round of 16	Newell's Old Boys (Argentina)	6–0	(Bolivia) San José	Rosario, Argentina
21:15 (UTC-3)	Schiavi 6', 35'; Formica 26', 61'; Estigarribia 60'; Salvatierra 90+2'	Report		Stadium: Estadio Marcelo Bielsa; Attendance: 35,000; Referee: Martín Vázquez (Uruguay)

October 21, 2010 Round of 16	San José (Bolivia)	2–0	(Argentina) Newell's Old Boys	Oruro, Bolivia
20:45 (UTC-4)	Méndez 20'; Villalba 81'	Report		Stadium: Estadio Jesús Bermúdez; Referee: Giovanni Perluzzo (Venezuela)

November 2, 2010 Quarterfinals	Newell's Old Boys (Argentina)	0–0	(Ecuador) LDU Quito	Rosario, Argentina
21:15 (UTC-3)		Report		Stadium: Estadio Marcelo Bielsa; Referee: Darío Ubriaco (Uruguay)

November 10, 2010 Quarterfinals	LDU Quito (Ecuador)	1–0	(Argentina) Newell's Old Boys	Quito, Ecuador
21:20 (UTC-5)	W. Calderón 81'	Report		Stadium: Estadio Casa Blanca; Referee: Óscar Ruiz (Colombia)

Newell's Old Boys eliminated by LDU Quito on points 1–4.

==== Vélez Sársfield ====
2010 Copa Sudamericana

September 2, 2010 Second stage	Vélez Sársfield (Argentina)	0–1	(Argentina) Banfield	Buenos Aires, Argentina
19:45 (UTC-3)		Report	García 30'	Stadium: Estadio José Amalfitani; Referee: Néstor Pitana (Argentina)

September 15, 2010 Second stage	Banfield (Argentina)	1–1	(Argentina) Vélez Sársfield	Buenos Aires, Argentina
20:30 (UTC-3)	Carrusca 15'	Report	Cristaldo 90'	Stadium: Estadio Florencio Sola; Referee: Saúl Laverni (Argentina)

Vélez Sársfield eliminated by Banfield on points 1–4.

2011 Copa Libertadores

February 15, 2011 Second stage	Vélez Sársfield (Argentina)	3–0	(Venezuela) Caracas	Buenos Aires, Argentina
19:30 UTC−03:00	Moralez 45'; Ramírez 61'; Martínez 84' (pen.)	Report		Stadium: Estadio José Amalfitani; Referee: Enrique Osses (Chile)

March 3, 2011 Second stage	Vélez Sársfield (Argentina)	3–4	(Chile) Universidad Católica	Buenos Aires, Argentina
20:15 UTC−03:00	Ortiz 20'; Fernández 21'; Papa 45'	Report	Pratto 1', 88'; Costa 74'; Pizarro 90'	Stadium: Estadio José Amalfitani; Referee: Carlos Torres (Paraguay)

March 10, 2011 Second stage	Unión Española (Chile)	2–1	(Argentina) Vélez Sársfield	Santiago, Chile
19:15 UTC−03:00	Ligüera 3'; Leal 26'	Report	Ramírez 69'	Stadium: Estadio Santa Laura; Referee: Wilson Seneme (Brazil)

March 24, 2011 Second stage	Vélez Sársfield (Argentina)	2–1	(Chile) Unión Española	Buenos Aires, Argentina
21:45 UTC−03:00	Papa 23'; Silva 69'	Report	Delgado 34'	Stadium: Estadio José Amalfitani; Referee: Salvio Fagundes (Brazil)

April 7, 2011 Second stage	Universidad Católica (Chile)	0–0	(Argentina) Vélez Sársfield	Santiago, Chile
21:15 UTC−04:00		Report		Stadium: Estadio San Carlos de Apoquindo; Referee: Jorge Larrionda (Uruguay

April 14, 2011 Second stage	Caracas (Venezuela)	0–3	(Argentina) Vélez Sársfield	Caracas, Venezuela
19:00 UTC−04:30		Report	Moralez 21'; Silva 47', 55'	Stadium: Estadio Olímpico de la UCV; Referee: José Buitrago (Colombia)

April 26, 2011 Round of 16	Vélez Sársfield (Argentina)	3–0	(Ecuador) LDU Quito	Buenos Aires, Argentina
21:50 UTC−03:00	Fernández 8', 11'; Domínguez 55'	Report		Stadium: Estadio José Amalfitani; Referee: Carlos Amarilla (Paraguay)

May 5, 2011 Round of 16	LDU Quito (Ecuador)	0–2	(Argentina) Vélez Sársfield	Quito, Ecuador
20:45 UTC−05:00		Report	Álvarez 45'; Bella 80'	Stadium: Estadio Casa Blanca; Referee: Wilmar Roldán (Colombia)

May 12, 2011 Quarterfinals	Vélez Sársfield (Argentina)	3–0	(Paraguay) Libertad	Buenos Aires, Argentina
20:15 UTC−03:00	Moralez 21'; Martínez 76' (pen.), 81'	Report		Stadium: Estadio Alberto J. Armando; Referee: Wilson Seneme (Brazil)

May 18, 2011 Quarterfinals	Libertad (Paraguay)	2–4	(Argentina) Vélez Sársfield	Asunción, Paraguay
18:30 UTC−04:00	Rojas 44'; Maciel 51'	Report	Moralez 45', 67'; Franco 87' (pen.); Fernández 88'	Stadium: Estadio Defensores del Chaco; Referee: Heber Lopes (Brazil)

May 26, 2011 Semifinals	Peñarol (Uruguay)	1–0	(Argentina) Vélez Sársfield	Montevideo, Uruguay
21:50 (UTC−3)	D. Rodríguez 45'	Report		Stadium: Estadio Centenario; Referee: Carlos Amarilla (Paraguay)

June 2, 2011 Semifinals	Vélez Sársfield (Argentina)	2–1	(Uruguay) Peñarol	Buenos Aires, Argentina
21:50 UTC−03:00	Tobio 45+1'; Silva 67'	Report	Mier 34'	Stadium: Estadio José Amalfitani; Referee: Enrique Osses (Chile)

Vélez Sársfield eliminated by Peñarol on away goals.

=== Women's summary ===
Team / Competition	2010 Copa Libertadores de Fútbol Femenino
Boca Juniors	Third place

==== Boca Juniors ====
2010 Copa Libertadores de Fútbol Femenino

October 4, 2010 First stage	Boca Juniors (Argentina)	4–1	(Bolivia) Florida	Barueri, Brazil
17:00	Bruzca 20'; Gómez 22'; Gatti 53', 73'	Report	Méndez 23'	Stadium: Arena Barueri; Referee: Yeimy Martínez (Colombia)

October 8, 2010 First stage	Boca Juniors (Argentina)	12–1	(Peru) Universidad Particular de Iquitos	Barueri, Brazil
17:00	Ojeda 4', 28', 33', 69'; Gatti 15', 43'; Huber 18', 23'; Gerez 36'; Gómez 55'; Barbita 64'; Santana 72'	Report	Flores 61'	Stadium: Arena Barueri; Attendance: 60; Referee: Yercinia Correa (Venezuela)

October 10, 2010 First stage	Boca Juniors (Argentina)	2–2	(Paraguay) Universidad Autónoma	Barueri, Brazil
12:00	Bruzca 62'; Ojeda 72'	Report	Riveros 23'; Vázquez 88' (pen.)	Stadium: Arena Barueri; Referee: Simone Xavier (Brazil)

October 12, 2010 First stage	Boca Juniors (Argentina)	1–1	(Chile) Everton	Barueri, Brazil
17:00	Gerez 75'	Report	Arias 65'	Stadium: Arena Barueri; Attendance: 60; Referee: Yeimy Martínez (Colombia)

October 15, 2010 Semifinals	Santos (Brazil)	2–0	(Argentina) Boca Juniors	Barueri, Brazil
19:00	Maurine 74'; Suzana 78'	Report		Stadium: Arena Barueri

October 17, 2010 Third place match	Deportivo Quito (Ecuador)	1–2	(Argentina) Boca Juniors	Barueri, Brazil
09:45	Quinteros 82'	Report	Cotelo 39'; González 68'	Stadium: Arena Barueri

Boca Juniors defeated Deportivo Quito and finished in third place.

Win Draw Loss

== National teams ==
=== Men's ===
This section covers Argentina men's matches from August 1, 2010, to July 31, 2011.

==== Friendly matches ====
August 11, 2010	Republic of Ireland	0–1	Argentina	Dublin, Republic of Ireland
19:45 UTC+1		Report	Di María 20'	Stadium: Aviva Stadium; Attendance: 49,500; Referee: Peter Rasmussen (Denmark)

September 7, 2010	Argentina	4–1	Spain	Buenos Aires, Argentina
17:00 UTC-3	Messi 10'; Higuaín 13'; Tevez 34'; Agüero 90+1'	Report	Llorente 84'	Stadium: Estadio Antonio V. Liberti; Attendance: 65,000; Referee: Óscar Ruiz (Colombia)

October 8, 2010	Japan	1–0	Argentina	Saitama, Japan
19:50 UTC+9	Okazaki 19'	Report		Stadium: Saitama Stadium 2002; Attendance: 57,735; Referee: Pawell Gil (Poland)

November 17, 2010	Argentina	1–0	Brazil	Doha, Qatar
20:00 UTC+3	Messi 90+2'	Report		Stadium: Khalifa International Stadium; Attendance: 50,000; Referee: Abdullah Balideh (Qatar)

February 9, 2011	Argentina	2–1	Portugal	Geneva, Switzerland
21:00 UTC+1	Di María 13'; Messi 89' (pen.)	Report	Ronaldo 21'	Stadium: Stade de Genève; Attendance: 30,000; Referee: Massimo Busacca (Switzerland)

March 16, 2011	Argentina	4–1	Venezuela	San Juan, Argentina
UTC-3	Chávez 20'; Mouche 35', 53'; Aued 75'	Report	Arismendi 30'	Stadium: Estadio del Bicentenario; Attendance: 25,000; Referee: Claudio Puga (Chile)

March 26, 2011	United States	1–1	Argentina	East Rutherford, New Jersey, United States
19:00 UTC-5	Agudelo 58'	Report	Cambiasso 41'	Stadium: New Meadowlands Stadium; Attendance: 78,936; Referee: Roberto García Orozco (Mexico)

March 29, 2011	Costa Rica	0–0	Argentina	San José, Costa Rica
20:00 UTC-6		Report		Stadium: Estadio Nacional de Costa Rica; Attendance: 35,000; Referee: Marco Antonio Rodríguez (Mexico)

April 20, 2011	Argentina	2–2	Ecuador	Mar del Plata, Argentina
UTC-3	Yacob 32'; Hauche 34'	Report	Quiñónez 26'; Castillo 68' (pen.)	Stadium: Estadio José María Minella; Referee: Roberto Silvera (Uruguay)

May 25, 2011	Argentina	4–2	Paraguay	Resistencia, Argentina
16:00 UTC-3	Hauche 9', 44'; Fernández 37'; Pérez 73'	Report	Zeballos 14'; Marecos 55'	Stadium: Estadio Centenario; Attendance: 25,000; Referee: Roberto Silvera (Uruguay)

June 1, 2011	Nigeria	4–1	Argentina	Abuja, Nigeria
19:30 UTC+1	Uche 9', 39'; Obinna 28' (pen.); Emenike 51'	Report	Boselli 90+8' (pen.)	Stadium: Abuja Stadium; Referee: Ibrahim Chaibou (Niger)

June 5, 2011	Poland	2–1	Argentina	Warsaw, Poland
20:00 UTC+2	Mierzejewski 25'; Brożek 66'	Report	Ruben 46'	Stadium: Stadion Wojska Polskiego; Referee: Manuel Gräfe (Germany)

June 20, 2011	Argentina	4–0	Albania	Buenos Aires, Argentina
18:00 UTC-3	Lavezzi 5'; Messi 42'; Agüero 74'; Tevez 89'	Report		Stadium: Estadio Antonio V. Liberti; Attendance: 21,000; Referee: Jorge Larrionda (Uruguay)

==== 2011 Copa América ====
July 1, 2011 First stage	Argentina	1–1	Bolivia	La Plata, Argentina
21:45	Agüero 75'	Report	Rojas 47'	Stadium: Estadio Ciudad de La Plata; Referee: Roberto Silvera (Uruguay)

July 6, 2011 First stage	Argentina	0–0	Colombia	Santa Fe, Argentina
21:45		Report		Stadium: Estadio Brigadier General Estanislao López; Referee: Sálvio Fagundes (Brazil)

July 11, 2011 First stage	Argentina	3–0	Costa Rica	Córdoba, Argentina
21:45	Agüero 45', 52'; Di María 63'	Report		Stadium: Estadio Mario Alberto Kempes; Referee: Víctor Hugo Rivera (Peru)

16 July 2011 Quarterfinals	Argentina	1–1 (4–5 p)	Uruguay	Santa Fé, Argentina
19:15	Higuaín 17'	Report	Pérez 5'	Stadium: Estadio Brigadier Estanislao López; Attendance: 30,000; Referee: Carlos Amarilla (Paraguay)
	Penalties
	Messi (penalty scored); Burdisso (penalty scored); Tevez (penalty missed); Pastore (penalty scored); Higuaín (penalty scored)		Forlán (penalty scored); Suárez (penalty scored); Scotti (penalty scored); Gargano (penalty scored); Cáceres (penalty scored)

=== Women's ===
This section covers Argentina women's matches from August 1, 2010, to July 31, 2011.

==== 2010 Sudamericano Femenino ====
November 4, 2010 First stage	Argentina	3–0	Bolivia	Latacunga, Ecuador
17:00 UTC-5	Ojeda 6', 39' (pen.); Banini 51'	Report		Stadium: Estadio La Cocha; Attendance: 3,000; Referee: Yanina del Carmen Mujica (Venezuela)

November 6, 2010 First stage	Chile	1–2	Argentina	Ambato, Ecuador
17:00 UTC-5	Lara 85' (pen.)	Report	Pereyra 40', 71'	Stadium: Estadio Bellavista; Referee: Adriana Lucia Correa (Colombia)

November 8, 2010 First stage	Argentina	2–0	Peru	Riobamba, Ecuador
19:00 UTC-5	González 65'; Blanco 68'	Report		Stadium: Estadio Olímpico; Attendance: 1,300; Referee: Ana Márques (Brazil)

November 12, 2010 First stage	Ecuador	1–0	Argentina	Latacunga, Ecuador
19:00 UTC-5	Rodríguez 35'	Report		Stadium: Estadio La Cocha; Referee: Norma González (Paraguay)

November 17, 2010 Second stage	Brazil	4–0	Argentina	Latacunga, Ecuador
17:00 UTC-5	Grazielle 24'; Rosana 36'; Formiga 63'; Cristiane 76'	Report		Stadium: Estadio La Cocha; Referee: Norma González (Paraguay

November 19, 2010 Second stage	Chile	0–0	Argentina	Latacunga, Ecuador
15:00 UTC-5		Report		Stadium: Estadio La Cocha; Referee: Yanina del Carmen Mujica (Venezuela)

November 21, 2010 Second stage	Colombia	1–0	Argentina	Quito, Ecuador
12:00 UTC-5	Betancourt 51'	Report		Stadium: Estadio Olímpico Atahualpa; Referee: Shirley Cornejo (Bolivia)

Win Draw Loss
