= 2010 Copa Sudamericana final stages =

The finals stages of the 2010 Copa Sudamericana de Clubes are the Round of 16, Quarterfinals, Semifinals, and Finals. Teams from the Round of 16 onwards were seeded depending on which Second Stage tie they win (i.e. the winner of Match O1 has the 1 seed).

== Bracket ==
Round of 16
2	(Argentina) Independiente	0	4	4
15	(Uruguay) Defensor Sporting	1	2	3
7	(Colombia) Deportes Tolima	0	3	3
10	(Argentina) Banfield	2	0	2
8	(Ecuador) LDU Quito	2	6	8
9	(Chile) Unión San Felipe	4	1	5
1	(Bolivia) San José	0	2	2
16	(Argentina) Newell's Old Boys	6	0	6
4	(Brazil) Palmeiras	1	3	4
13	(Bolivia) Universitario	0	1	1
5	(Colombia) Santa Fe	0	1	1
12	(Brazil) Atlético Mineiro	2	0	2
6	(Brazil) Avaí	1	3	4
11	(Ecuador) Emelec	2	1	3
3	(Uruguay) Peñarol	0	3	3
14	(Brazil) Goiás (a)	1	2	3

Quarterfinals
2	(Argentina) Independiente (a)	2	0	2
7	(Colombia) Deportes Tolima	2	0	2
8	(Ecuador) LDU Quito	0	1	1
16	(Argentina) Newell's Old Boys	0	0	0
4	(Brazil) Palmeiras	1	2	3
12	(Brazil) Atlético Mineiro	1	0	1
6	(Brazil) Avaí	2	0	2
14	(Brazil) Goiás	2	1	3

Semifinals
2	(Argentina) Independiente (a)	2	2	4
8	(Ecuador) LDU Quito	3	1	4
4	(Brazil) Palmeiras	1	1	2
14	(Brazil) Goiás (a)	0	2	2

Finals
2	(Argentina) Independiente (p)	0	3	3 (5)
14	(Brazil) Goiás	2	1	3 (3)

Note: The bracket was adjusted according to the rules of the tournament so that the two Brazilian teams would face each other in the semifinals.

== Round of 16 ==
Team 1	Agg.	Team 2	1st leg	2nd leg
San José (Bolivia)	2–6	(Argentina) Newell's Old Boys	0–6	2–0
Independiente (Argentina)	4–3	(Uruguay) Defensor Sporting	0–1	4–2
Peñarol (Uruguay)	3–3 (a)	(Brazil) Goiás	0–1	3–2
Palmeiras (Brazil)	4–1	(Bolivia) Universitario	1–0	3–1
Santa Fe (Colombia)	1–2	(Brazil) Atlético Mineiro	0–2	1–0
Avaí (Brazil)	4–3	(Ecuador) Emelec	1–2	3–1
Deportes Tolima (Colombia)	3–2	(Argentina) Banfield	0–2	3–0
LDU Quito (Ecuador)	8–5	(Chile) Unión San Felipe	2–4	6–1

=== Match C1 ===
October 6, 2010
21:15 UTC−03:00

Newell's Old Boys (Argentina)	6–0	(Bolivia) San José
Schiavi 6', 35'; Formica 26', 61'; Estigarribia 60'; Salvatierra 90+2'	Report

Estadio Marcelo Bielsa, Rosario
Attendance: 35,000
Referee: Martín Vázquez (Uruguay)

October 21, 2010
20:45 UTC−04:00

San José (Bolivia)	2–0	(Argentina) Newell's Old Boys
Méndez 20'; Villalba 81'	Report

Estadio Jesús Bermúdez, Oruro
Referee: Giovanni Perluzzo (Venezuela)

San José 3–3 Newell's Old Boys on points. Newell's Old Boys advanced on goal difference.

=== Match C2 ===
September 28, 2010
21:15 UTC−03:00

Defensor Sporting (Uruguay)	1–0	(Argentina) Independiente
Gracián 65' (o.g.)	Report

Estadio Centenario, Montevideo
Referee: Carlos Torres (Paraguay)

October 19, 2010
19:20 UTC−03:00

Independiente (Argentina)	4–2	(Uruguay) Defensor Sporting
Silvera 15'; Fredes 19'; Cabrera 28'; Martínez 75'	Report	Mora 12'; Rodríguez 48'

Estadio Libertadores de América, Avellaneda
Referee: Wilson Seneme (Brazil)

Independiente 3–3 Defensor Sporting on points. Independiente advanced on goal difference.

=== Match C3 ===
October 13, 2010
19:30 UTC−03:00

Goiás (Brazil)	1–0	(Uruguay) Peñarol
Rafael Moura 23'	Report

Estádio do Governo do Estado de Goiás (Serra Dourada), Goiânia
Referee: Diego Abal (Argentina)

October 20, 2010
19:30 UTC−03:00

Peñarol (Uruguay)	3–2	(Brazil) Goiás
Corujo 38'; M. Sosa 43'; Martinuccio 84'	Report	Rafael Moura 17'; Carlos Alberto 77'

Estadio Centenario, Montevideo
Referee: Carlos Amarilla (Paraguay)

Peñarol 3–3 Goiás on points. Goiás advanced on away goals.

=== Match C4 ===
October 14, 2010
20:15 UTC−04:00

Universitario (Bolivia)	0–1	(Brazil) Palmeiras
	Report	Marcos Assunção 26'

Estadio Olímpico Patria, Sucre
Referee: Víctor Hugo Carrillo (Peru)

October 20, 2010
22:00 UTC−03:00

Palmeiras (Brazil)	3–1	(Bolivia) Universitario
Kléber 11'; Luan 27'; Danilo 68'	Report	Cirillo 61'

Arena Barueri, Barueri
Referee: Antonio Arias (Paraguay)

Palmeiras advanced on points 6–0.

=== Match C5 ===
October 13, 2010
22:00 UTC−03:00

Atlético Mineiro (Brazil)	2–0	(Colombia) Santa Fe
Obina 29', 62'	Report

Estádio Joaquim Henrique Nogueira, Sete Lagoas
Referee: Carlos Torres (Paraguay)

October 20, 2010
19:00 UTC−05:00

Santa Fe (Colombia)	1–0	(Brazil) Atlético Mineiro
Noguera 60'	Report

Estadio Nemesio Camacho (El Campín), Bogotá
Referee: Carlos Vera (Ecuador)

Santa Fe 3–3 Atlético Mineiro on points. Atlético Mineiro advanced on goal difference.

=== Match C6 ===
October 13, 2010
20:00 UTC−05:00

Emelec (Ecuador)	2–1	(Brazil) Avaí
Eltinho 64' (o.g.); Rojas 90+2'	Report	Marcelinho 70'

Estadio George Capwell, Guayaquil
Referee: Francisco Peñuela (Colombia)

October 21, 2010
20:15 UTC−03:00

Avaí (Brazil)	3–1	(Ecuador) Emelec
Roberto 47'; Eltinho 51'; Émerson 53'	Report	Rojas 2'

Estádio Aderbal Ramos da Silva (Ressacada), Florianópolis
Referee: Patricio Polic (Chile)

Avaí 3–3 Emelec on points. Avaí advanced on goal difference.

=== Match C7 ===
September 29, 2010
21:15 UTC−03:00

Banfield (Argentina)	2–0	(Colombia) Deportes Tolima
V. López 14'; Zelaya 25'	Report

Estadio Florencio Sola, Buenos Aires
Referee: Salvio Fagundes (Brazil)

October 12, 2010
20:30 UTC−05:00

Deportes Tolima (Colombia)	3–0	(Argentina) Banfield
Medina 12'; Marrugo 41'; Marangoni 74'	Report

Estadio Manuel Murillo Toro, Ibagué
Referee: Roberto Silvera (Uruguay)

Deportes Tolima 3–3 Banfield on points. Deportes Tolima advanced on goal difference.

=== Match C8 ===
October 12, 2010
20:15 UTC−04:00

Unión San Felipe (Chile)	4–2	(Ecuador) LDU Quito
Distéfano 24'; Vildozo 27', 67'; Toloza 86'	Report	Barcos 36' (pen.); Luna 61'

Estadio Santa Laura, Santiago
Attendance: 10,000
Referee: Rafael Furchi (Argentina)

October 19, 2010
20:00 UTC−05:00

LDU Quito (Ecuador)	6–1	(Chile) Unión San Felipe
Chila 21'; Barcos 24' (pen.), 73'; Guagua 51'; Luna 59'; Salgueiro 66'	Report	Vildozo 38'

Estadio Casa Blanca, Quito
Referee: Wilmar Roldán (Colombia)

LDU Quito 3–3 Unión San Felipe on points. LDU Quito advanced on goal difference.

== Quarterfinals ==
Team 1	Agg.	Team 2	1st leg	2nd leg
LDU Quito (Ecuador)	1–0	(Argentina) Newell's Old Boys	0–0	1–0
Independiente (Argentina)	(a) 2–2	(Colombia) Deportes Tolima	2–2	0–0
Avaí (Brazil)	2–3	(Brazil) Goiás	2–2	0–1
Palmeiras (Brazil)	3–1	(Brazil) Atlético Mineiro	1–1	2–0

=== Match S1 ===
November 2, 2010
21:15 UTC−03:00

Newell's Old Boys (Argentina)	0–0	(Ecuador) LDU Quito
	Report

Estadio Marcelo Bielsa, Rosario
Referee: Darío Ubriaco (Uruguay)

November 10, 2010
21:20 UTC−05:00

LDU Quito (Ecuador)	1–0	(Argentina) Newell's Old Boys
W. Calderón 81'	Report

Estadio Casa Blanca, Quito
Referee: Óscar Ruiz (Colombia)

LDU Quito advanced on points 4–1.

=== Match S2 ===
November 3, 2010
19:15 UTC−05:00

Deportes Tolima (Colombia)	2–2	(Argentina) Independiente
Medina 40'; Marangoni 73'	Report	Silvera 30' (pen.); J. Velázquez 78'

Estadio Manuel Murillo Toro, Ibagué
Referee: Carlos Simon (Brazil)

November 11, 2010
21:30 UTC−03:00

Independiente (Argentina)	0–0	(Colombia) Deportes Tolima
	Report

Estadio Presidente Juan Domingo Perón, Avellaneda
Referee: Carlos Amarilla (Paraguay)

Note: The second leg was played at a neutral venue since Independiente received a one-match stadium ban after crowd trouble at their home ground during their Round of 16 second leg against Defensor Sporting.

Independiente 2–2 Deportes Tolima on points. Independiente advanced on away goals.

=== Match S3 ===
October 27, 2010
22:00 UTC−02:00

Goiás (Brazil)	2–2	(Brazil) Avaí
Rafael Moura 29', 90+4'	Report	Davi 52' (pen.); Marcelinho 71'

Estádio do Governo do Estado de Goiás (Serra Dourada), Goiânia
Referee: Wilson Seneme (Brazil)

November 11, 2010
20:00 UTC−02:00

Avaí (Brazil)	0–1	(Brazil) Goiás
	Report	Rafael Moura 45'

Estádio Aderbal Ramos da Silva (Ressacada), Florianópolis
Referee: Heber Lopes (Brazil)

Goiás advanced on points 4–1.

=== Match S4 ===
October 27, 2010
19:45 UTC−02:00

Atlético Mineiro (Brazil)	1–1	(Brazil) Palmeiras
Obina 76' (pen.)	Report	Kléber 55'

Estádio Joaquim Henrique Nogueira (Arena do Jacaré), Sete Lagoas
Referee: Marcelo de Lima Henrique (Brazil)

November 10, 2010
21:50 UTC−02:00

Palmeiras (Brazil)	2–0	(Brazil) Atlético Mineiro
Marcos Assunção 27'; Luan 79'	Report

Estádio Municipal Paulo Machado de Carvalho (Pacaembu), São Paulo
Referee: Leandro Vuaden (Brazil)

Palmeiras advanced on points 4–1.

== Semifinals ==
Team 1	Agg.	Team 2	1st leg	2nd leg
Independiente (Argentina)	(a) 4–4	(Ecuador) LDU Quito	2–3	2–1
Palmeiras (Brazil)	2–2 (a)	(Brazil) Goiás	1–0	1–2

=== Match F1 ===
November 18, 2010
19:30 UTC−05:00

LDU Quito (Ecuador)	3–2	(Argentina) Independiente
Salgueiro 45'; Bolaños 49'; Reasco 57'	Report	Silvera 58'; Mareque 64'

Estadio Casa Blanca, Quito
Referee: Roberto Silvera (Uruguay)

November 25, 2010
21:30 UTC−03:00

Independiente (Argentina)	2–1	(Ecuador) LDU Quito
Parra 27'; Fredes 46'	Report	Salgueiro 45+1'

Estadio Libertadores de América, Avellaneda
Referee: Enrique Osses (Chile)

Independiente 3–3 LDU Quito on points. Independiente advanced on away goals.

=== Match F2 ===
November 17, 2010
21:50 UTC−02:00

Goiás (Brazil)	0–1	(Brazil) Palmeiras
	Report	Marcos Assunção 49'

Estádio do Governo do Estado de Goiás (Serra Dourada), Goiânia
Referee: Evandro Roman (Brazil)

November 24, 2010
21:50 UTC−02:00

Palmeiras (Brazil)	1–2	(Brazil) Goiás
Luan 34'	Report	Carlos Alberto 45'; Ernando 83'

Estádio Municipal Paulo Machado de Carvalho (Pacaembu), São Paulo
Referee: Heber Lopes (Brazil)

Palmeiras 3–3 Goiás on points. Goiás advanced on away goals.

== Finals ==
Note: In the final, the away goals rule would not be applied, and extra time would be played if necessary.

December 1, 2010
22:00 UTC−02:00

Goiás (Brazil)	2–0	(Argentina) Independiente
Rafael Moura 14'; Otacílio Neto 22'	Report

Estádio do Governo do Estado de Goiás (Serra Dourada), Goiânia
Referee: Carlos Torres (Paraguay)

December 8, 2010
21:00 UTC−03:00

Independiente (Argentina)	3–1 (a.e.t.)	(Brazil) Goiás
J. Velázquez 19'; Parra 27', 34'	Report	Rafael Moura 22'
Penalties
M. Velázquez (penalty scored); Parra (penalty scored); Gracián (penalty scored); Matheu (penalty scored); Tuzzio (penalty scored)	5–3	(penalty scored) Toloi; (penalty scored) Éverton Santos; (penalty missed) Felipe; (penalty scored) Rafael Moura

Estadio Libertadores de América, Avellaneda
Referee: Óscar Ruiz (Colombia)

Independiente 3–3 Goiás on points. Independiente won on penalties.

Copa Nissan Sudamericana de Clubes
2010 Champion

Independiente
First Title
