= 2010 Copa Sudamericana preliminary stages =

The preliminary stages of the 2010 Copa Sudamericana de Clubes are:

- First Stage, contested by 16 teams in 8 two-legged ties. The winner of each tie will advance to the Second Stage.
- Second Stage, contested by 30 teams, 8 of whom advanced from the First Stage, in 15 two-legged ties. The winner of each tie will advance to the Round of 16, joining the defending champion, LDU Quito.

== First stage ==
Team 1	Agg.	Team 2	1st leg	2nd leg
Colo-Colo (Chile)	3–3 (a)	(Bolivia) Universitario	0–2	3–1
River Plate (Uruguay)	4–4 (a)	(Paraguay) Guaraní	0–2	4–2
Barcelona (Ecuador)	5–2	(Peru) Universidad César Vallejo	2–1	3–1
Trujillanos (Venezuela)	2–5	(Colombia) Atlético Huila	1–4	1–1
Oriente Petrolero (Bolivia)	3–2	Universidad de Chile	2–2	1–0
Olimpia (Paraguay)	1–3	(Uruguay) Defensor Sporting	0–2	1–1
Universidad San Martín (Peru)	(a) 3–3	(Ecuador) Deportivo Quito	2–3	2–1
Santa Fe (Colombia)	4–2	(Venezuela) Deportivo Lara	0–2	4–0

=== Match A ===
August 17, 2010
19:15 (UTC-4)

Universitario (Bolivia)	2–0	(Chile) Colo-Colo
Galindo 58'; Lima 80'	Report

Estadio Olímpico Patria, Sucre
Attendance: 15,000
Referee: Líber Prudente (Uruguay)

August 25, 2010
18:00 (UTC-4)

Colo-Colo (Chile)	3–1	(Bolivia) Universitario
Cámpora 38', 52'; Fuenzalida 67'	Report	Galindo 45'

Estadio Monumental David Arellano, Santiago
Attendance: 10,000
Referee: Carlos Amarilla (Paraguay)

Colo-Colo 3–3 Universitario on points. Universitario advanced on away goals.

=== Match B ===
August 19, 2010
18:30 (UTC-4)

Guaraní (Paraguay)	2–0	(Uruguay) River Plate
Fabbro 67'; Teixeira 73'	Report

Estadio Defensores del Chaco, Asunción
Referee: Jorge Osorio (Chile)

September 1, 2010
20:15 (UTC-3)

River Plate (Uruguay)	4–2	(Paraguay) Guaraní
Ramírez 23'; Zambrana 66'; Correa 74', 86'	Report	Teixeira 9'; Joel Benítez 45'

Estadio Centenario, Montevideo
Referee: Leandro Vuaden (Brazil)

River Plate 3–3 Guaraní on points. Guaraní advanced on away goals.

=== Match C ===
August 12, 2010
19:50 (UTC-5)

Universidad César Vallejo (Peru)	1–2	(Ecuador) Barcelona
H. Hurtado 20'	Report	J. Hurtado 22'; Noir 64'

Estadio Mansiche, Trujillo
Referee: Joaquín Antequera (Bolivia)

August 24, 2010
20:45 (UTC-5)

Barcelona (Ecuador)	3–1	(Peru) Universidad César Vallejo
Noir 9'; Oyola 33'; Samudio 58'	Report	Cazulo 32'

Estadio Monumental Banco Pichincha, Guayaquil
Referee: Albert Duarte (Colombia)

Barcelona advanced on points 6–0.

=== Match D ===
August 4, 2010
21:30 (UTC-5)

Atlético Huila (Colombia)	4–1	(Venezuela) Trujillanos
Carbonero 5'; Castillo 32'; Martínez 38' (pen.); Velásquez 90+1'	Report	R. García 19'

Estadio Guillermo Plazas Alcid, Neiva
Referee: Omar Ponce (Ecuador)

September 1, 2010
21:15 (UTC-4:30)

Trujillanos (Venezuela)	1–1	(Colombia) Atlético Huila
R. García 3'	Report	Rueda 8'

Estadio José Alberto Pérez, Valera
Referee: Raúl Orosco (Bolivia)

Atlético Huila advanced on points 4–1.

=== Match E ===
August 24, 2010
19:15 (UTC-4)

Universidad de Chile	2–2	(Bolivia) Oriente Petrolero
Bueno 49'; Puch 70'	Report	Rea 46'; Saucedo 48'

Estadio El Teniente, Rancagua
Attendance: 12,000
Referee: Víctor Hugo Rivera (Peru)

August 31, 2010
18:45 (UTC-4)

Oriente Petrolero (Bolivia)	1–0	Universidad de Chile
Peinado 12'	Report

Estadio Ramón Tahuichi Aguilera, Santa Cruz
Attendance: 30,000
Referee: Enrique Cáceres (Paraguay)

Oriente Petrolero advanced on points 4–1.

=== Match F ===
August 3, 2010
19:00 (UTC-3)

Defensor Sporting (Uruguay)	2–0	(Paraguay) Olimpia
Mora 37', 71'	Report

Estadio Centenario, Montevideo
Referee: Néstor Pitana (Argentina)

September 2, 2010
21:15 (UTC-3)

Olimpia (Paraguay)	1–1	(Uruguay) Defensor Sporting
Ferreyra 86'	Report	Mora 50'

Estadio Defensores del Chaco, Asunción
Referee: Enrique Osses (Chile)

Defensor Sporting advanced on points 4–1.

=== Match G ===
August 4, 2010
19:15 (UTC-5)

Deportivo Quito (Ecuador)	3–2	(Peru) Universidad San Martín
Mina 23'; Fernández 61'; Checa 90'	Report	Vitti 51'; Alemanno 74'

Estadio Olímpico Atahualpa, Quito
Referee: Patricio Polic (Chile)

August 10, 2010
19:15 (UTC-5)

Universidad San Martín (Peru)	2–1	(Ecuador) Deportivo Quito
Arriola 78' (pen.); Alemanno 85'	Report	Checa 45'

Estadio Monumental, Lima
Attendance: 6,000
Referee: Francisco Peñuela (Colombia)

Universidad San Martín 3–3 Deportivo Quito on points. Universidad San Martín advanced on away goals.

=== Match H ===
August 17, 2010
21:00 (UTC-4:30)

Deportivo Lara (Venezuela)	2–0	(Colombia) Santa Fe
Ocanto 13'; Chalar 45'	Report

Estadio Metropolitano de Cabudare, Barquisimeto
Referee: Víctor Hugo Carrillo (Peru)

August 26, 2010
21:30 (UTC-5)

Santa Fe (Colombia)	4–0	(Venezuela) Deportivo Lara
Otálvaro 6'; Bernal 50'; Noguera 72'; Anchico 90+4' (pen.)	Report

Estadio Nemesio Camacho (El Campín), Bogotá
Referee: Pablo Pozo (Chile)

Santa Fe 3–3 Deportivo Lara on points. Santa Fe advanced on goal difference.

== Second stage ==
Team 1	Agg.	Team 2	1st leg	2nd leg
San José (Bolivia)	5–1	(Colombia) Atlético Huila	1–1	4–0
Argentinos Juniors (Argentina)	1–2	(Argentina) Independiente	0–1	1–1
Peñarol (Uruguay)	3–1	(Ecuador) Barcelona	1–0	2–1
Palmeiras (Brazil)	3–2	(Brazil) Vitória	0–2	3–0
Caracas (Venezuela)	1–2	(Colombia) Santa Fe	1–2	0–0
Avaí (Brazil)	3–2	(Brazil) Santos	3–1	0–1
Deportes Tolima (Colombia)	2–1	(Bolivia) Oriente Petrolero	0–1	2–0
Unión San Felipe (Chile)	2–2 (8–7 p)	(Paraguay) Guaraní	1–1	1–1
Banfield (Argentina)	2–1	(Argentina) Vélez Sársfield	1–0	1–1
Emelec (Ecuador)	6–2	(Peru) Universidad San Martín	1–2	5–0
Atlético Mineiro (Brazil)	1–0	(Brazil) Grêmio Prudente	0–0	1–0
Cerro Porteño (Paraguay)	2–3	(Bolivia) Universitario	0–1	2–2
Grêmio (Brazil)	1–3	(Brazil) Goiás	1–1	0–2
Sport Huancayo (Peru)	2–9	(Uruguay) Defensor Sporting	0–9	2–0
Estudiantes (Argentina)	1–2	(Argentina) Newell's Old Boys	0–1	1–1

=== Match O1 ===
September 7, 2010
20:45 (UTC-5)

Atlético Huila (Colombia)	1–1	(Bolivia) San José
Martínez 61' (pen.)	Report	de Souza 27' (pen.)

Estadio Guillermo Plazas Alcid, Neiva
Referee: Carlos Vera (Ecuador)

September 22, 2010
20:15 (UTC-4)

San José (Bolivia)	4–0	(Colombia) Atlético Huila
Villalba 5' de Souza 23'; Bejarano 42'; Medina 66'	Report

Estadio Jesús Bermúdez, Oruro
Referee: Carlos Galeano (Paraguay)

San José advanced on points 4-1.

=== Match O2 ===
August 26, 2010
21:15 (UTC-3)

Independiente (Argentina)	1–0	(Argentina) Argentinos Juniors
Galeano 9'	Report

Estadio Libertadores de América, Avellaneda
Referee: Sergio Pezzotta (Argentina)

September 9, 2010
19:30 (UTC-3)

Argentinos Juniors (Argentina)	1–1	(Argentina) Independiente
Ortigoza 34' (pen.)	Report	Gracián 66'

Estadio Diego Armando Maradona, Buenos Aires
Referee: Néstor Pitana (Argentina)

Independiente advanced on points 4–1.

=== Match O3 ===
August 31, 2010
20:15 (UTC-5)

Barcelona (Ecuador)	0–1	(Uruguay) Peñarol
	Report	Perlaza 60' (o.g.)

Estadio Monumental Banco Pichincha, Guayaquil
Referee: Juan Soto (Venezuela)

September 14, 2010
19:15 (UTC-3)

Peñarol (Uruguay)	2–1	(Ecuador) Barcelona
Ramis 72'; Pacheco 90+4' (pen.)	Report	S. Sosa 79' (o.g.)

Estadio Centenario, Montevideo
Referee: Heber Lopes (Brazil)

Peñarol advanced on points 6–0.

=== Match O4 ===
August 11, 2010
21:50 (UTC-3)

Vitória (Brazil)	2–0	(Brazil) Palmeiras
Ramon 48'; Neto Coruja 88'	Report

Estádio Manoel Barradas (Barradão), Salvador
Referee: Leandro Vuaden (Brazil)

August 19, 2010
21:50 (UTC-3)

Palmeiras (Brazil)	3–0	(Brazil) Vitória
Tadeu 45', 58'; Marcos Assunção 89'	Report

Estádio do Pacaembu, São Paulo
Referee: Heber Lopes (Brazil)

Palmeiras 3–3 Vitória on points. Palmeiras advanced on goal difference.

=== Match O5 ===
September 16, 2010
19:45 (UTC-5)

Santa Fe (Colombia)	2–1	(Venezuela) Caracas
Seijas 55'; Rodas 71'	Report	Castillo 37'

Estadio Nemesio Camacho (El Campín), Bogotá
Referee: Omar Ponce (Ecuador)

September 23, 2010
21:15 (UTC-4:30)

Caracas (Venezuela)	0–0	(Colombia) Santa Fe
	Report

Estadio Olímpico de la UCV, Caracas
Referee: Georges Buckley (Peru)

Santa Fe advanced on points 4–1.

=== Match O6 ===
August 12, 2010
21:50 (UTC-3)

Santos (Brazil)	1–3	(Brazil) Avaí
Zé Eduardo 69'	Report	Rudnei 17'; Vandinho 64', 76'

Estádio Municipal Paulo Machado de Carvalho (Pacaembu), São Paulo
Referee: Ricardo Marques (Brazil)

August 18, 2010
21:50 (UTC-3)

Avaí (Brazil)	0–1	(Brazil) Santos
	Report	Zé Eduardo 24'

Estádio Aderbal Ramos da Silva (Ressacada), Florianópolis
Referee: Evandro Román (Brazil)

Avaí 3–3 Santos on points. Avaí advanced on goal difference.

=== Match O7 ===
September 14, 2010
20:45 (UTC-4)

Oriente Petrolero (Bolivia)	1–0	(Colombia) Deportes Tolima
Saucedo 80'	Report

Estadio Ramón Tahuichi Aguilera, Santa Cruz
Referee: Darío Ubriaco (Uruguay)

September 21, 2010
20:45 (UTC-5)

Deportes Tolima (Colombia)	2–0	(Bolivia) Oriente Petrolero
Medina 2'; Perlaza 25'	Report

Estadio Manuel Murillo Toro, Ibagué
Referee: Juan Soto (Venezuela)

Deportes Tolima 3–3 Oriente Petrolero on points. Deportes Tolima advanced on goal difference.

=== Match O9 ===
September 7, 2010
19:30 (UTC-4)

Guaraní (Paraguay)	1–1	(Chile) Unión San Felipe
Ortiz 55'	Report	Vildozo 90+3' (pen.)

Estadio Defensores del Chaco, Asunción
Referee: Saúl Laverni (Argentina)

September 23, 2010
19:15 (UTC-4)

Unión San Felipe (Chile)	1–1	(Paraguay) Guaraní
González 57'	Report	Carballo 44'
Penalties
González (penalty scored); Páez (penalty scored); Suárez (penalty scored); Vildozo (penalty scored); Pérez (penalty missed); Fernández (penalty missed); Quiñones (penalty scored); Bravo (penalty scored); Domínguez (penalty missed); Estay (penalty scored); Magaña (penalty scored)	8–7	(penalty scored) Fabbro; (penalty scored) Carballo; (penalty scored) Paniagua; (penalty scored) Guglielmone; (penalty missed) Chávez; (penalty missed) Marecos; (penalty scored) Sosa; (penalty scored) Benítez; (penalty missed) Mendoza; (penalty scored) Filippini; (penalty missed) Aurrecochea

Estadio Santa Laura, Santiago
Attendance: 8,000
Referee: Pablo Lunati (Argentina)

Unión San Felipe 3–3 Guaraní on points. Unión San Felipe advanced 8–7 on penalties.

=== Match O10 ===
September 2, 2010
19:45 (UTC-3)

Vélez Sársfield (Argentina)	0–1	(Argentina) Banfield
	Report	García 30'

Estadio José Amalfitani, Buenos Aires
Referee: Néstor Pitana (Argentina)

September 15, 2010
20:30 (UTC-3)

Banfield (Argentina)	1–1	(Argentina) Vélez Sársfield
Carrusca 15'	Report	Cristaldo 90'

Estadio Florencio Sola, Buenos Aires
Referee: Saúl Laverni (Argentina)

Banfield advanced on points 4–1.

=== Match O11 ===
September 15, 2010
21:00 (UTC-5)

Universidad San Martín (Peru)	2–1	(Ecuador) Emelec
Vitti 45'; Quinteros 74'	Report	Rojas 4'

Estadio Monumental, Lima
Referee: Antonio Arias (Paraguay)

September 23, 2010
18:15 (UTC-5)

Emelec (Ecuador)	5–0	(Peru) Universidad San Martín
Ayoví 12', 61'; Quiroz 17'; Giménez 46'; Valencia 89'	Report

Estadio George Capwell, Guayaquil
Referee: Enrique Osses (Chile)

Emelec 3–3 Universidad San Martín on points. Emelec advanced on goal difference.

=== Match O12 ===
August 4, 2010
19:00 (UTC-3)

Grêmio Prudente (Brazil)	0–0	(Brazil) Atlético Mineiro
	Report

Estádio Eduardo José Farah, Presidente Prudente
Referee: Evandro Roman (Brazil)

August 11, 2010
21:50 (UTC-3)

Atlético Mineiro (Brazil)	1–0	(Brazil) Grêmio Prudente
Ricardinho 90+2'	Report

Estádio Municipal Epaminondas Mendes Brito (Ipatingão), Ipatinga
Referee: Heber Lopes (Brazil)

Atlético Mineiro advanced on points 4–1.

=== Match O13 ===
September 9, 2010
21:15 (UTC-4)

Universitario (Bolivia)	1–0	(Paraguay) Cerro Porteño
Galindo 83'	Report

Estadio Olímpico Patria, Sucre
Referee: Georges Buckley (Peru)

September 21, 2010
19:15 (UTC-4)

Cerro Porteño (Paraguay)	2–2	(Bolivia) Universitario
dos Santos 54'; Núñez 73' (pen.)	Report	Galindo 23'; Cirillo 68'

Estadio General Pablo Rojas, Asunción
Referee: Jorge Larrionda (Uruguay)

Universitario advanced on points 4–1.

=== Match O14 ===
August 5, 2010
19:30 (UTC-3)

Goiás (Brazil)	1–1	(Brazil) Grêmio
Rafael Moura 78' (pen.)	Report	Hugo 36'

Estádio Serra Dourada, Goiânia
Referee: Marcelo de Lima Henrique (Brazil)

August 12, 2010
19:30 (UTC-3)

Grêmio (Brazil)	0–2	(Brazil) Goiás
	Report	Amaral 9'; Éverton Santos 90'

Estádio Olímpico Monumental, Porto Alegre
Referee: Paulo César Oliveira (Brazil)

Goiás advanced on points 4–1.

=== Match O15 ===
September 16, 2010
21:45 (UTC-3)

Defensor Sporting (Uruguay)	9–0	(Peru) Sport Huancayo
de Souza 1' (pen.), 46'; Risso 43'; Amado 47'; Mora 56', 66' (pen.); Luna 61' (pen.), 79'; Aranda 76'	Report

Estadio Centenario, Montevideo
Referee: Marcelo de Lima Henrique (Brazil)

Note: This is the largest margin of victory in the history of the Copa Sudamericana.

September 22, 2010
13:00 (UTC-5)

Sport Huancayo (Peru)	2–0	(Uruguay) Defensor Sporting
Suárez 45' (o.g.); Ramírez 66'	Report

Estadio Huancayo, Huancayo
Referee: José Buitrago (Colombia)

Sport Huancayo 3–3 Defensor Sporting on points. Defensor Sporting advanced on goal difference.

=== Match O16 ===
September 16, 2010
19:00 (UTC-3)

Newell's Old Boys (Argentina)	1–0	(Argentina) Estudiantes
Formica 90+3' (pen.)	Report

Estadio Marcelo Bielsa, Rosario
Referee: Diego Abal (Argentina)

September 22, 2010
21:15 (UTC-3)

Estudiantes (Argentina)	1–1	(Argentina) Newell's Old Boys
Fernández 12'	Report	Borghello 43'

Estadio Centenario Dr. José Luis Meiszner, Quilmes
Referee: Juan Pablo Pompei (Argentina)

Newell's Old Boys advanced on points 4–1.
