= Miguel González =

Miguel González or Miguel Gonzalez may refer to:

== Politicians ==
- Miguel González Avelar (1937–2011), Mexican politician
- Miguel González de Legarra (born 1962), Spanish politician
- Miguel González Caballero (born 1991), Spanish politician

== Sportspeople ==
=== Association football ===
- Miguel González (footballer, born 1927), Spanish footballer
- Miguel González (footballer, born 1983), Argentine football attacking midfielder
- Miguel Gonzalez (soccer, born 1987), American soccer midfielder
- Miguel González (footballer, born 1990), Mexican football forward
- Miguel González (footballer, born 1991), Mexican football defender

=== Baseball ===
- Miguel González (pitcher) (born 1984), Mexican baseball pitcher
- Miguel González (catcher) (born 1990), Venezuelan baseball catcher
- Miguel Alfredo González (1983–2017), Cuban baseball pitcher

=== Boxing ===
- Miguel González (Mexican boxer) (born 1967), Mexican boxer

=== Other sports ===
- Miguel González (basketball) (1938–2022), Spanish basketball player

== See also ==
- Miguel Ángel González (disambiguation)
- Mike Gonzalez (disambiguation)
- Miguel Gonçalves, village east of Sao Filipe on the island of Fogo, Cape Verde
