= Miguel Ángel González =

Miguel Ángel González may refer to:

- Miguel Ángel González (Argentine footballer) (born 1983), known as El Mágico, Argentine football midfielder
- Miguel Ángel González (boxer) (born 1970), Mexican boxer
- Miguel Ángel González Caballero (born 1991), Spanish politician
- Miguel Ángel González Salum (born 1967), Mexican politician
- Miguel Ángel González (sprinter) (born 1944), Mexican sprinter
- Miguel Ángel González Suárez (1947–2024), Spanish football goalkeeper
- Mike González (baseball catcher) (Miguel Ángel González Cordero, 1890–1977), Cuban baseball catcher and manager
- Migue (Miguel Ángel González González, born 1980), Spanish football defender

== See also ==
- Miguel González (disambiguation)
- Mike Gonzalez (disambiguation)
