= 2010 Copa Sudamericana =

2010 Copa Sudamericana de Clubes
Copa Nissan Sudamericana de Clubes 2010 Copa Nissan Sul-americana da Clubes 2010

Tournament details
- Dates: 3 August – 8 December
- Teams: 39 (from 10 associations)

Final positions
- Champions: (Argentina) Independiente (1st title)
- Runners-up: (Brazil) Goiás

Tournament statistics
- Matches played: 76
- Goals scored: 205 (2.7 per match)
- Top scorer: (Brazil) Rafael Moura (8 goals)

The 2010 Copa Sudamericana de Clubes (officially the 2010 Copa Nissan Sudamericana de Clubes for sponsorship reasons) was the 9th edition of CONMEBOL's secondary international club tournament. The winner qualified for the 2011 Copa Libertadores, the 2011 Recopa Sudamericana, and the 2011 Suruga Bank Championship. LDU Quito was the defending champion.

Starting with this edition, each country gained an additional berth, with the exception of Argentina and Brazil. Boca Juniors and River Plate were no longer invited to the competition without merit.

== Qualified teams ==
Association	Team (berth)	Qualification method
(Argentina) Argentina 6 berths	Banfield (Argentina 1)	2009–10 Primera División 1st place overall
(Argentina) Argentina 6 berths	Argentinos Juniors (Argentina 2)	2009–10 Primera División 2nd place overall
(Argentina) Argentina 6 berths	Estudiantes (Argentina 3)	2009–10 Primera División 3rd place overall
(Argentina) Argentina 6 berths	Newell's Old Boys (Argentina 4)	2009–10 Primera División 4th place overall
(Argentina) Argentina 6 berths	Independiente (Argentina 5)	2009–10 Primera División 5th place overall
(Argentina) Argentina 6 berths	Vélez Sársfield (Argentina 6)	2009–10 Primera División 6th place overall
(Bolivia) Bolivia 3 berths	San José (Bolivia 1)	2009 Apertura 3rd place
(Bolivia) Bolivia 3 berths	Oriente Petrolero (Bolivia 2)	2009 Clausura 3rd place
(Bolivia) Bolivia 3 berths	Universitario de Sucre (Bolivia 3)	2010 Apertura Loser's Hexagonal winner
(Brazil) Brazil 8 berths	Palmeiras (Brazil 1)	2009 Série A 5th place
(Brazil) Brazil 8 berths	Avaí (Brazil 2)	2009 Série A 6th place
(Brazil) Brazil 8 berths	Atlético Mineiro (Brazil 3)	2009 Série A 7th place
(Brazil) Brazil 8 berths	Grêmio (Brazil 4)	2009 Série A 8th place
(Brazil) Brazil 8 berths	Goiás (Brazil 5)	2009 Série A 9th place
(Brazil) Brazil 8 berths	Grêmio Prudente (Brazil 6)	2009 Série A 11th place
(Brazil) Brazil 8 berths	Santos (Brazil 7)	2009 Série A 12th place
(Brazil) Brazil 8 berths	Vitória (Brazil 8)	2009 Série A 13th place
(Chile) Chile 3 berths	Unión San Felipe (Chile 1)	2009 Copa Chile champion
(Chile) Chile 3 berths	Colo-Colo (Chile 2)	Best-placed team after Round 1 of the 2010 Primera División
(Chile) Chile 3 berths	Universidad de Chile (Chile 3)	2010 Copa Sudamericana playoff winner
(Colombia) Colombia 3 berths	Deportes Tolima (Colombia 1)	2009 Primera A 2nd best-placed non-champion
(Colombia) Colombia 3 berths	Santa Fe (Colombia 2)	2009 Copa Colombia champion
(Colombia) Colombia 3 berths	Atlético Huila (Colombia 3)	2009 Primera A 3rd best-placed non-champion
(Ecuador) Ecuador 3 + 1 berths	LDU Quito (O8)	2009 Copa Sudamericana champion
(Ecuador) Ecuador 3 + 1 berths	Emelec (Ecuador 1)	2010 Serie A first stage winner
(Ecuador) Ecuador 3 + 1 berths	Barcelona (Ecuador 2)	2010 Serie A first stage 3rd place
(Ecuador) Ecuador 3 + 1 berths	Deportivo Quito (Ecuador 3)	2010 Serie A first stage 4th place
(Paraguay) Paraguay 3 berths	Cerro Porteño (Paraguay 1)	2009 Primera División best-placed champion
(Paraguay) Paraguay 3 berths	Olimpia (Paraguay 2)	2009 Primera División 2nd best non-champion
(Paraguay) Paraguay 3 berths	Guaraní (Paraguay 3)	2009 Primera División 3rd best non-champion
(Peru) Peru 3 berths	Sport Huancayo (Peru 1)	2009 Descentralizado 2nd best-placed non-finalist
(Peru) Peru 3 berths	Universidad San Martín (Peru 2)	2009 Descentralizado 3rd best-placed non-finalist
(Peru) Peru 3 berths	Universidad César Vallejo (Peru 3)	2009 Descentralizado 4th best-placed non-finalist
(Uruguay) Uruguay 3 berths	Peñarol (Uruguay 1)	2009–10 Primera División champion
(Uruguay) Uruguay 3 berths	River Plate (Uruguay 2)	2009–10 Primera División 2nd best-placed non-finalist
(Uruguay) Uruguay 3 berths	Defensor Sporting (Uruguay 3)	2009–10 Primera División 3rd best-placed non-finalist
(Venezuela) Venezuela 3 berths	Caracas (Venezuela 1)	2009 Copa Venezuela champion
(Venezuela) Venezuela 3 berths	Trujillanos (Venezuela 2)	2009 Copa Venezuela runner-up
(Venezuela) Venezuela 3 berths	Deportivo Lara (Venezuela 3)	2009–10 Primera División 2nd best-placed non-finalist

== Round and draw dates ==
The calendar shows the dates of the rounds and draw. All events occurred in 2010 unless otherwise stated. Dates in italics are only reference dates for the week the matches are to be played. The draw for this tournament took place on April 28 in Luque at the CONMEBOL Conventions Center.

Event	Start date	End date
Draw	April 28	
First Stage	August 3	September 2
Second Stage	August 4	September 23
Round of 16	September 28	October 21
Quarterfinals	October 27	November 11
Semifinals	November 17	November 25
Finals	December 1	December 8

== Tie-breaking criteria ==
The tournament is played as a single-elimination tournament, with each round played as two-legged ties. At each stage of the tournament teams receive 3 points for a win, 1 point for a draw, and no points for a loss. If two or more teams are equal on points, the following criteria will be applied to determine which team advances to the next round:

1. better goal difference;
2. higher number of away goals scored;
3. penalty shootout.

== Preliminary stages ==
The first two stages of the competition are the First Stage and Second Stage. Both stages are largely played concurrent to each other.

=== First stage ===
In the First Stage, 16 teams played two-legged ties (one game at home and one game away) against another opponent. The winner of each tie advanced to the Second Stage. Team #1 played the second leg at home. The stage began on August 3 and ended on September 2.

Team 1	Agg.	Team 2	1st leg	2nd leg
Colo-Colo (Chile)	3–3 (a)	(Bolivia) Universitario de Sucre	0–2	3–1
River Plate (Uruguay)	4–4 (a)	(Paraguay) Guaraní	0–2	4–2
Barcelona (Ecuador)	5–2	(Peru) Universidad César Vallejo	2–1	3–1
Trujillanos (Venezuela)	2–5	(Colombia) Atlético Huila	1–4	1–1
Oriente Petrolero (Bolivia)	3–2	Universidad de Chile	2–2	1–0
Olimpia (Paraguay)	1–3	(Uruguay) Defensor Sporting	0–2	1–1
Universidad San Martín (Peru)	3–3 (a)	(Ecuador) Deportivo Quito	2–3	2–1
Santa Fe (Colombia)	4–2	(Venezuela) Deportivo Lara	0–2	4–0

=== Second stage ===
In the Second Stage, 22 teams, along with eight winners from the First Stage, played two-legged ties (one game at home and one game away) against one another. The winner of each tie advanced to the round of 16. Team #1 played the second leg at home. The stage began on August 4 and ended on September 23.

Team 1	Agg.	Team 2	1st leg	2nd leg
San José (Bolivia)	5–1	(Colombia) Atlético Huila	1–1	4–0
Argentinos Juniors (Argentina)	1–2	(Argentina) Independiente	0–1	1–1
Peñarol (Uruguay)	3–1	(Ecuador) Barcelona	1–0	2–1
Palmeiras (Brazil)	3–2	(Brazil) Vitória	0–2	3–0
Caracas (Venezuela)	1–2	(Colombia) Santa Fe	1–2	0–0
Avaí (Brazil)	3–2	(Brazil) Santos	3–1	0–1
Deportes Tolima (Colombia)	2–1	(Bolivia) Oriente Petrolero	0–1	2–0
Unión San Felipe (Chile)	2–2 (8–7 p)	(Paraguay) Guaraní	1–1	1–1
Banfield (Argentina)	2–1	(Argentina) Vélez Sársfield	1–0	1–1
Emelec (Ecuador)	6–2	(Peru) Universidad San Martín	1–2	5–0
Atlético Mineiro (Brazil)	1–0	(Brazil) Grêmio Prudente	0–0	1–0
Cerro Porteño (Paraguay)	2–3	(Bolivia) Universitario de Sucre	0–1	2–2
Grêmio (Brazil)	1–3	(Brazil) Goiás	1–1	0–2
Sport Huancayo (Peru)	2–9	(Uruguay) Defensor Sporting	0–9	2–0
Estudiantes (Argentina)	1–2	(Argentina) Newell's Old Boys	0–1	1–1

== Final stages ==
Teams from the Round of 16 onwards will be seeded depending on which Second Stage tie they win (i.e. the winner of Match O1 will have the 1 seed).

=== Bracket ===
Round of 16
2	(Argentina) Independiente	0	4	4
15	(Uruguay) Defensor Sporting	1	2	3
7	(Colombia) Deportes Tolima	0	3	3
10	(Argentina) Banfield	2	0	2
8	(Ecuador) LDU Quito	2	6	8
9	(Chile) Unión San Felipe	4	1	5
1	(Bolivia) San José	0	2	2
16	(Argentina) Newell's Old Boys	6	0	6
4	(Brazil) Palmeiras	1	3	4
13	(Bolivia) Universitario de Sucre	0	1	1
5	(Colombia) Santa Fe	0	1	1
12	(Brazil) Atlético Mineiro	2	0	2
6	(Brazil) Avaí	1	3	4
11	(Ecuador) Emelec	2	1	3
3	(Uruguay) Peñarol	0	3	3
14	(Brazil) Goiás (a)	1	2	3

Quarterfinals
2	(Argentina) Independiente (a)	2	0	2
7	(Colombia) Deportes Tolima	2	0	2
8	(Ecuador) LDU Quito	0	1	1
16	(Argentina) Newell's Old Boys	0	0	0
4	(Brazil) Palmeiras	1	2	3
12	(Brazil) Atlético Mineiro	1	0	1
6	(Brazil) Avaí	2	0	2
14	(Brazil) Goiás	2	1	3

Semifinals
2	(Argentina) Independiente (a)	2	2	4
8	(Ecuador) LDU Quito	3	1	4
4	(Brazil) Palmeiras	1	1	2
14	(Brazil) Goiás (a)	0	2	2

Finals
2	(Argentina) Independiente (p)	0	3	3 (5)
14	(Brazil) Goiás	2	1	3 (3)

Note: The bracket was adjusted according to the rules of the tournament so that the two Brazilian teams would face each other in the semifinals.

=== Round of 16 ===
The round of 16 began on September 28 and ended on October 21. Fifteen teams advanced to the Round of 16 from the Second Stage. LDU Quito, as the defending champion, entered directly into this stage and carries seed O8. In each tie, the team with the higher seed (Team #1) played at home in the second leg.

Team 1	Agg.	Team 2	1st leg	2nd leg
San José (Bolivia)	2–6	(Argentina) Newell's Old Boys	0–6	2–0
Independiente (Argentina)	4–3	(Uruguay) Defensor Sporting	0–1	4–2
Peñarol (Uruguay)	3–3 (a)	(Brazil) Goiás	0–1	3–2
Palmeiras (Brazil)	4–1	(Bolivia) Universitario de Sucre	1–0	3–1
Santa Fe (Colombia)	1–2	(Brazil) Atlético Mineiro	0–2	1–0
Avaí (Brazil)	4–3	(Ecuador) Emelec	1–2	3–1
Deportes Tolima (Colombia)	3–2	(Argentina) Banfield	0–2	3–0
LDU Quito (Ecuador)	8–5	(Chile) Unión San Felipe	2–4	6–1

=== Quarterfinals ===
The quarterfinals began on October 27 and ended on November 11. In each tie, the team with the higher seed (Team #1) played at home in the second leg.

Team 1	Agg.	Team 2	1st leg	2nd leg
LDU Quito (Ecuador)	1–0	(Argentina) Newell's Old Boys	0–0	1–0
Independiente (Argentina)	2–2 (a)	(Colombia) Deportes Tolima	2–2	0–0
Avaí (Brazil)	2–3	(Brazil) Goiás	2–2	0–1
Palmeiras (Brazil)	3–1	(Brazil) Atlético Mineiro	1–1	2–0

=== Semifinals ===
The semifinals began on November 17 and ended on November 25. Should two or more teams from a same country reach the semifinals, they were going to be forced to face each other. In each tie, the team with the higher seed (Team #1) played at home in the second leg.

Team 1	Agg.	Team 2	1st leg	2nd leg
Independiente (Argentina)	4–4 (a)	(Ecuador) LDU Quito	2–3	2–1
Palmeiras (Brazil)	2–2 (a)	(Brazil) Goiás	1–0	1–2

=== Finals ===
In the finals, if the finalists are tied on points after the culmination of the second leg, the winner is the team who scored the most goals. If they are tied on goals, the game moves onto extra time and a penalty shootout if necessary. The away goals rule does not apply in the finals. The team with the higher seed played at home in the second leg.

December 1, 2010
22:00 (UTC-2)

Goiás (Brazil)	2–0	(Argentina) Independiente
Rafael Moura 14'; Otacílio Neto 22'	Report

Estádio do Governo do Estado de Goiás (Serra Dourada), Goiânia
Referee: Carlos Torres (Paraguay)

December 8, 2010
21:00 (UTC-3)

Independiente (Argentina)	3–1 (a.e.t.)	(Brazil) Goiás
J. Velázquez 19'; Parra 27', 34'	Report	Rafael Moura 22'
Penalties
M. Velázquez (penalty scored); Parra (penalty scored); Gracián (penalty scored); Matheu (penalty scored); Tuzzio (penalty scored)	5–3	(penalty scored) Toloi; (penalty scored) Éverton Santos; (penalty missed) Felipe; (penalty scored) Rafael Moura

Estadio Libertadores de América, Avellaneda
Referee: Óscar Ruiz (Colombia)

Copa Nissan Sudamericana de Clubes
2010 Champion

Independiente
First Title

== Top goalscorers ==
Pos	Player	Team	Goals
1	(Brazil) Rafael Moura	(Brazil) Goiás	8
2	(Uruguay) Rodrigo Mora	(Uruguay) Defensor Sporting	6
3	(Brazil) Marcos Assunção	(Brazil) Palmeiras	4
3	(Bolivia) Roberto Galindo	(Bolivia) Universitario de Sucre	4
3	(Argentina) Ángel Vildozo	(Chile) Unión San Felipe	4
6	(Argentina) Hernán Barcos	(Ecuador) LDU Quito	3
6	(Argentina) Mauro Formica	(Argentina) Newell's Old Boys	3
6	(Brazil) Luan	(Brazil) Palmeiras	3
6	(Colombia) Wilder Medina	(Colombia) Deportes Tolima	3
6	(Brazil) Obina	(Brazil) Atlético Mineiro	3
6	(Argentina) Facundo Parra	(Argentina) Independiente	3
6	(Ecuador) Joao Rojas	(Ecuador) Emelec	3
6	(Uruguay) Juan Manuel Salgueiro	(Ecuador) LDU Quito	3
6	(Argentina) Andrés Silvera	(Argentina) Independiente	3

== See also ==
- 2010 Copa Libertadores
- 2011 Recopa Sudamericana
- 2011 Suruga Bank Championship
