= Nicolás Peric =

Chilean footballer (born 1978)

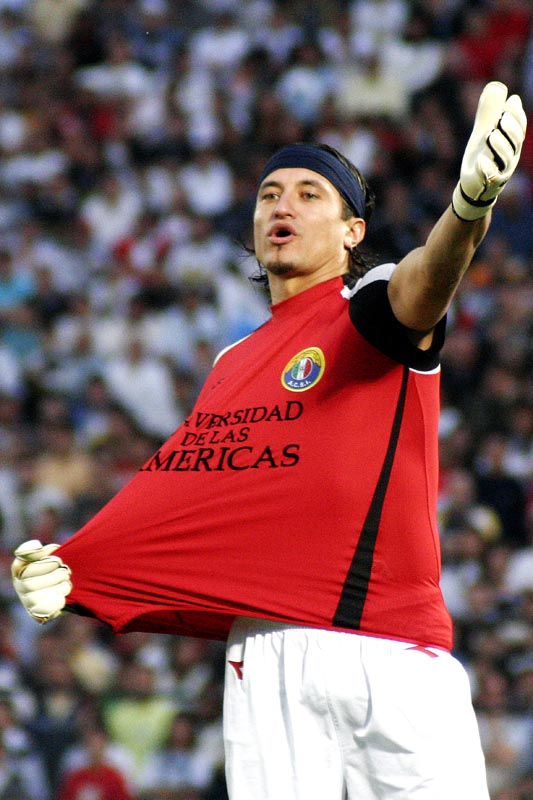
- Peric playing for Audax Italiano in 2006

Personal information
- Full name: Nicolás Miroslav Peric Villarreal
- Date of birth: 19 October 1978 (age 48)
- Place of birth: Talca, Chile
- Height: 1.83 m (6 ft 0 in)
- Position: Goalkeeper

Youth career
- Rangers

Senior career*
Years	Team	Apps	(Gls)
1998–2003	Rangers	102	(0)
2004	Universidad de Concepción	29	(1)
2005	Unión Española	5	(0)
2006–2007	Audax Italiano	82	(0)
2008	Gençlerbirliği	15	(0)
2009	Everton	10	(0)
2009–2010	Argentinos Juniors	20	(0)
2010	Olimpia	13	(0)
2011	Cobreloa	35	(0)
2012–2014	Rangers	62	(0)
2014–2015	Cobresal	31	(0)
2015–2018	Audax Italiano	79	(0)
2018–2021	Rangers	49	(0)
Total		523	(0)

International career
2001–2012	Chile	5	(0)
- * Club domestic league appearances and goals

Nicolás Miroslav Peric Villarreal (born 19 October 1978) is a Chilean former professional footballer who played as a goalkeeper. He is nicknamed Loco (Madman).

== Club career ==
Born in Talca, Peric joined hometown professional side Rangers youth set-up. Years later in 1998, he was promoted to first-adult team where did an impressive season four years later reaching the 2002 Torneo Apertura final alongside future international players like Marcos González and Ismael Fuentes.

In 2004, he joined Universidad de Concepcion which for that season reached its first ever Copa Libertadores qualification where Peric appeared as a starter as well as in the local tournament. Just for his birthday, on 19 October, Peric scored his first professional goal after a goal kick in a 4–2 away loss with Bolívar at La Paz. However, later in December he received a six-month ban from the Conmebol for having launch positive in a doping test, because he allegedly would have drunk a coca leaf tea before the game with Bolívar.

Once finished his ban in April 2005, he joined Chilean freshly champion in the age Unión Española to face the Torneo Clausura where would have to challenge the first-choice post with Jaime Bravo. After only playing five league games he left the club and then moved to Audax Italiano where again performed well in his career.

On 7 January 2008, it was reported that Peric joined Süper Lig club Gençlerbirliği after an impressive 2007 season at Audax. However, after a year at Ankara–based team he left the club after differences with the board, so he closed his spell at Turkey appearing 15 times between the 2007–08 and 2008–09 season.

After a brief spell at Everton de Viña del Mar, in June 2009 Peric signed for Argentinos Juniors which had Claudio Borghi as coach, who pretended him in his teams since 2007 when he was coaching Colo-Colo. The coming season as a first-choice and playing 16 of 19 league games he reached the 2010 Torneo Clausura title, missing the last matchday due to an injury when Argentinos beat Independiente 4–3 with youngster Luis Ojeda in the goal.

On 10 July 2010, Paraguayan side Olimpia through its president Eduardo Delmás confirmed Peric signing after goalie's untying from Argentinos Juniors. However, he only stayed six months here after confrontations with the club supporters and also coaches José Saturnino Cardozo and Luis Cubilla.

After finishing his contract with Olimpia, shortly after he returned to Chile and joined Cobreloa. Defending the goal with The Oranges he reached the 2011 Torneo Clausura finals where they were defeated 3–0 by the freshly Copa Sudamericana champions Universidad de Chile at Estadio Nacional after a goalless in Calama.

In 2012, he returned to Rangers and was a key member in the Torneo Clausura semifinals reaching. Two seasons later after Rangers relegation, Peric joined Cobresal in 2014, where proclaimed champion of the 2015 Torneo Clausura.

In 2015, he returned to Audax Italiano after eight years of his successful spell.

== Post-retirement ==
In March 2021, he joined ESPN Chile as a sport commentator.

== Honours ==
=== Club ===
Argentinos Juniors

- Argentine Primera División: 2010 Clausura

Cobresal

- Primera División de Chile: 2015 Clausura
