= Armando Mareque =

Argentine football manager and player

Personal information
- Full name: Armando Luis Mareque
- Date of birth: 14 January 1938
- Place of birth: General Pico, Argentina
- Date of death: 17 September 1990 (aged 52)
- Place of death: San José, Costa Rica
- Position: Defender

Senior career*
Years	Team	Apps	(Gls)
1958–1959	Tigre	8	(0)
1959–1966	Vélez Sarsfield	141	(0)
1967–1969	Colón	80	(2)

Managerial career
- 1969: Colón
- 1970: Vélez Sarsfield
- 1971: Chacarita Juniors
- 1972: Estudiantes LP
- 1972: Atlanta
- 1973: Newell's Old Boys
- 1973: Ferro Carril Oeste
- 1973: Cartaginés
- 1975: Cartaginés
- 1975: Xerez
- 1979: Cipolletti
- 1982: Deportivo Morón
- 1986: Deportivo Cuenca
- 1987: Alianza Cutral Có
- 1987: Argentinos Juniors
- 1989: Deportes Iquique
- 1990: Cartaginés
- * Club domestic league appearances and goals

Armando Luis Mareque (14 January 1938 – 17 September 1990) was an Argentine football manager and player who played as a defender.

== Playing career ==
- (Argentina) Tigre 1958–1959
- (Argentina) Vélez Sarsfield 1959–1966
- (Argentina) Colón 1967–1969

== Managerial career ==
- (Argentina) Colón 1969
- (Argentina) Vélez Sarsfield 1970
- (Argentina) Chacarita Juniors 1971
- (Argentina) Estudiantes de La Plata 1972
- (Argentina) Atlanta 1972
- (Argentina) Newell's Old Boys 1973
- (Argentina) Ferro Carril Oeste 1973
- (Costa Rica) Cartaginés 1973
- (Costa Rica) Cartaginés 1975
- (Spain) Xerez 1975
- (Argentina) Cipolletti 1979
- (Argentina) Deportivo Morón 1982
- (Ecuador) Deportivo Cuenca 1986
- (Argentina) Alianza de Cutral Có 1987
- (Argentina) Argentinos Juniors 1987
- (Chile) Deportes Iquique 1989
- (Costa Rica) Cartaginés 1990

== Personal life ==
He was the father of the footballer Lucas Mareque.
