= Michael Gonzales =

Michael Gonzales may refer to:

- Mike Gonzales (born 1964), American athlete
- Michael C. Gonzales, American diplomat
- Michael Dean Gonzales (born 1973), American murderer on death row
- Michael Gonzales (screenwriter) in Black Eagle (1988 film)
- Michael Gonzales (athlete) represented Puerto Rico at the 2002 Winter Olympics

== See also ==
- Michael-Ray Pallares González, (born 1980) is a professional tennis player
- Mike Gonzalez (disambiguation)
