= Mike Gonzalez =

Mike Gonzalez or González may refer to:

- Mike Gonzalez (pitcher) (born 1978), American baseball pitcher
- Mike González (catcher) (1890–1977), Cuban baseball catcher
- Mike Gonzalez (historian) (born 1943), British historian and literary critic

== See also ==
- Miguel González (disambiguation)
- Miguel Ángel González (disambiguation)
- Michael Gonzales (disambiguation)
- List of contributors to Project 2025#Authors refers to Project 2025 contributor Mike Gonzalez
