= Federico Carballo =

Argentine footballer

Personal information
- Full name: Héctor Federico Carballo
- Date of birth: 14 March 1980 (age 46)
- Place of birth: Morón, Argentina
- Height: 1.82 m (6 ft 0 in)
- Positions: Defender; defensive midfielder

Youth career
- Ferro Carril Oeste

Senior career*
Years	Team	Apps	(Gls)
1997–2004	Boca Juniors	3	(0)
2001	→ Motagua (loan)		
2001–2002	→ Deportivo Zitácuaro (loan)	31	(2)
2005–2006	Ferro Carril Oeste	12	(0)
2006–2007	Kuala Lumpur		
2007–2008	Provincial Osorno	56	(5)
2008–2012	Guaraní	98	(7)
2012–2014	Almirante Brown	39	(1)
2014–2015	Mitre	47	(0)
2016	Tristán Suárez	16	(0)
2017–2018	Ituzaingó	22	(0)
- * Club domestic league appearances and goals

Héctor Federico Carballo (born March 14, 1980) is a retired Argentine footballer.
