= Eduardo Quiñones =

Chilean footballer (born 1983)

Eduardo Quiñones (born 28 April 1983 in San Felipe, Chile) is a Chilean footballer currently playing for Curicó Unido of the Primera B Chilena.

== Teams ==
- (Chile) Unión San Felipe 2003–2010
- (Chile) Curicó Unido 2011–present

== Titles ==
- (Chile) Unión San Felipe 2009 (Torneo Apertura Primera B Championship) and 8Chilean Primera B Championship)
