= Miguel González (footballer, born 1983) =

Argentine footballer

Miguel Ángel González
Personal information
- Full name: Miguel Ángel González
- Date of birth: 10 August 1983 (age 43)
- Place of birth: Avellaneda, Argentina
- Height: 1.71 m (5 ft 7 in)
- Position: Attacking midfielder

Senior career*
Years	Team	Apps	(Gls)
1999–2002	Platense	42	(7)
2002–2003	Gimnasia LP	11	(2)
2003–2004	Ferro Carril	33	(6)
2004	→ Selangor (loan)	15	(4)
2005	Sportivo Italiano	10	(1)
2006	→ General Lamadrid (loan)	10	(0)
2006–2007	Racing Olavarría	25	(3)
2007–2008	Huracán	18	(2)
2008–2010	Atlanta	33	(13)
2011–2015	Unión San Felipe	82	(19)
2011	→ O'Higgins (loan)	8	(1)
2012	→ Colo-Colo (loan)	8	(0)
2012	→ Colo-Colo B (loan)	2	(1)
Total		297	(59)
- * Club domestic league appearances and goals as of 19 April 2015

Miguel Ángel González (born August 10, 1983, in Avellaneda), known as El Mágico, is a retired Argentine footballer. Previously, he played for Unión San Felipe and O'Higgins.

He took part in the 2010 Copa Sudamericana, after his team Unión San Felipe previously won the 2009 Copa Chile, playing in four matches and scoring a goal in the preliminary tie against Guaraní, before eventually being eliminated in the Round of 16 by LDU Quito.

In May 2011 he was linked with a move to Romanian club FC Brașov, where he would meet former team-mates Juan Toloza and David Distéfano. Reportedly he refused the move.
