= Marcelinho (footballer, born January 1987) =

Brazilian footballer

Personal information
- Full name: Marcelo Rodrigues
- Date of birth: January 9, 1987 (age 39)
- Place of birth: Santa Cruz do Sul, Brazil
- Height: 1.69 m (5 ft 7 in)
- Position: Forward

Team information
- Current team: Atlético Vega

Senior career*
Years	Team	Apps	(Gls)
2003–2005	Grêmio		
2005	São Caetano		
2005	→ Juventude (loan)		
2006–2008	São Caetano		
2008–2009	→ Bursaspor (loan)	6	(1)
2009	→ Caxias (loan)		
2010	Avaí	8	(0)
2011	Linense		
2011	Caxias	1	(0)
2012	Bonsucesso		
2012	Guaratinguetá	2	(0)
2012	UTA Arad	2	(0)
2013	Boa Esporte		
2013	São Luiz		
2016–	Atlético Vega		
- * Club domestic league appearances and goals

Marcelo Rodrigues (born January 9, 1987), known as Marcelinho, is a Brazilian footballer who plays as a forward for Atlético Vega.
