= Miguel González (footballer, born 1991) =

Mexican footballer (born 1991)

Miguel Ángel González Estrada (born April 26, 1991, in Tampico) is a Mexican professional footballer who last played for C.D. Tepatitlán de Morelos.
