= Lucas Mareque =

Argentine footballer

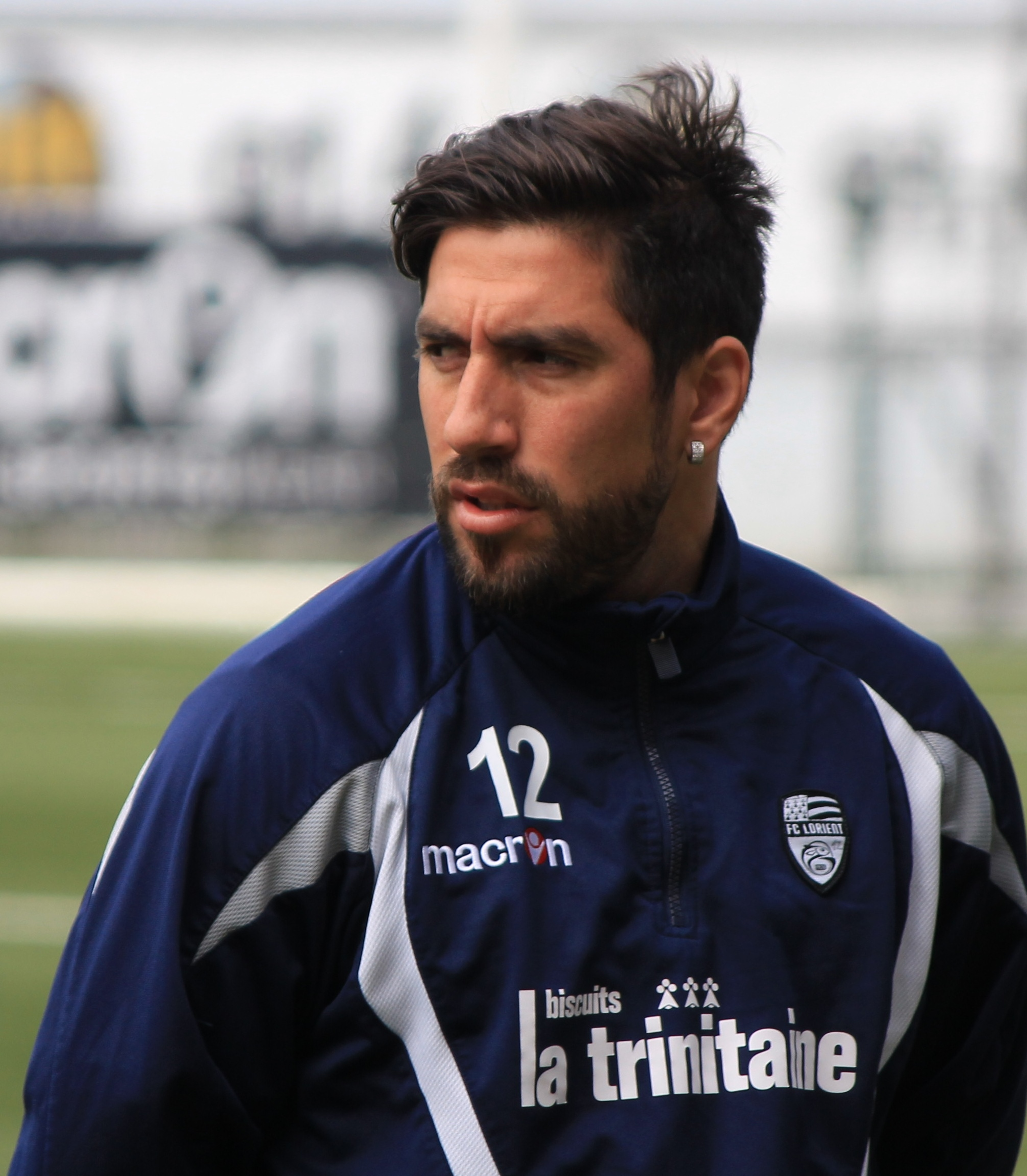

Personal information
- Full name: Lucas Armando Mareque
- Date of birth: January 12, 1983 (age 43)
- Place of birth: Morón, Argentina
- Height: 1.67 m (5 ft 6 in)
- Position: Left back

Senior career*
Years	Team	Apps	(Gls)
2004–2006	River Plate	45	(2)
2007–2008	Porto	4	(0)
2007–2008	→ Independiente (loan)	17	(0)
2008–2011	Independiente	104	(1)
2011–2013	Lorient	41	(1)
2015–2016	Barracas Central	23	(1)
2016–2017	Deportivo Español	11	(0)
- * Club domestic league appearances and goals as of 15:35, 7 January 2020 (UTC)

Lucas Armando Mareque Buccolini (born 12 January 1983) is an Argentine retired football left back.

== Career ==
Mareque started his career with River Plate in 2004. In 2007, he was transferred to Porto, where he made his league debut against União de Leiria on January 26. During his time at Porto, the club won the Primeira Liga.

After playing for Porto, Mareque returned to Argentina to play for Independiente on loan during the 2007 Apertura tournament. In the beginnings of 2008, Mareque was bought by Independiente as a permanent player.

In July 2011 he signed for the Ligue 1 club Lorient.

== Personal life ==
He is the son of the football player and manager Armando Mareque.

== Honours ==
Porto

- Primeira Liga: 2007–08

Independiente

- Copa Sudamericana: 2010
