= Roberto Galindo =

Bolivian footballer (born 1980)

Personal information
- Full name: Roberto Galindo Sánchez
- Date of birth: October 14, 1980 (age 46)
- Place of birth: Cochabamba, Bolivia
- Height: 1.79 m (5 ft 10 in)
- Position: Centre forward

Senior career*
Years	Team	Apps	(Gls)
2001–2002	Jorge Wilstermann	29	(3)
2002–2003	Iberoamericana	71	(34)
2004	Aurora	28	(10)
2005	La Paz	34	(11)
2006	Blooming	16	(1)
2007–2009	The Strongest	54	(12)
2009–2011	Universitario de Sucre	48	(29)
2011–2012	Oriente Petrolero	18	(3)
2012–2013	Nacional Potosi	1	(0)
2013	Sport Boys Warnes		
2014	Aurora		

International career^{‡}
2010	Bolivia	2	(1)
- * Club domestic league appearances and goals as of 3 March 2011 ‡ National team caps and goals as of 1 March 2011

Roberto Galindo Sánchez (born 14 October 1980) is a Bolivian footballer who plays a centre forward.

== Honours ==
Jorge Wilstermann

- Liga de Futbol Profesional Boliviano: 2000
