= Jaime Bravo (footballer) =

Chilean footballer (born 1982)

Personal information
- Full name: Jaime Alejandro Bravo Jeffery
- Date of birth: 4 April 1982 (age 44)
- Place of birth: Santiago, Chile
- Height: 1.76 m (5 ft 9 1/2 in)
- Position: Goalkeeper

Youth career
- 1990–1993: Barrabases
- 1994–2000: Universidad Católica

Senior career*
Years	Team	Apps	(Gls)
2001–2007	Unión Española	39	(0)
2003	→ Iberia (loan)	–	(0)
2004	→ Curicó Unido (loan)	–	(0)
2008–2009	Ñublense	67	(1)
2010	Unión San Felipe	23	(0)
2011	Santiago Morning	16	(0)
2012–2015	Audax Italiano	35	(0)
2015–2016	Coquimbo Unido	24	(0)
2016–2017	Deportes Pintana	23	(0)
2017–2018	Deportes Melipilla	28	(0)
Total		255	(0)

International career
1997	Chile U17	1	(0)
2000	Chile U20	0	(0)

Managerial career
- 2018–2019: Unión Española (gk coach)
- * Club domestic league appearances and goals

Jaime Alejandro Bravo Jeffery (born 4 April 1982), or simply Jaime Bravo, is a retired Chilean footballer, who played as a goalkeeper.

== International career ==
Jaime Bravo played for Chile national football team in the U–17 and U–20 categories.

== Post-retirement ==
Following his retirement, Bravo joined the technical staff of Fernando Díaz in Unión Española as a goakeeping coach.

After leaving Unión Española, Bravo switched to selling avocados.

== Honours ==
Unión Española

- Primera División de Chile (1): 2005 Apertura
