= Miguel González Caballero =

Spanish politician (born 1991)

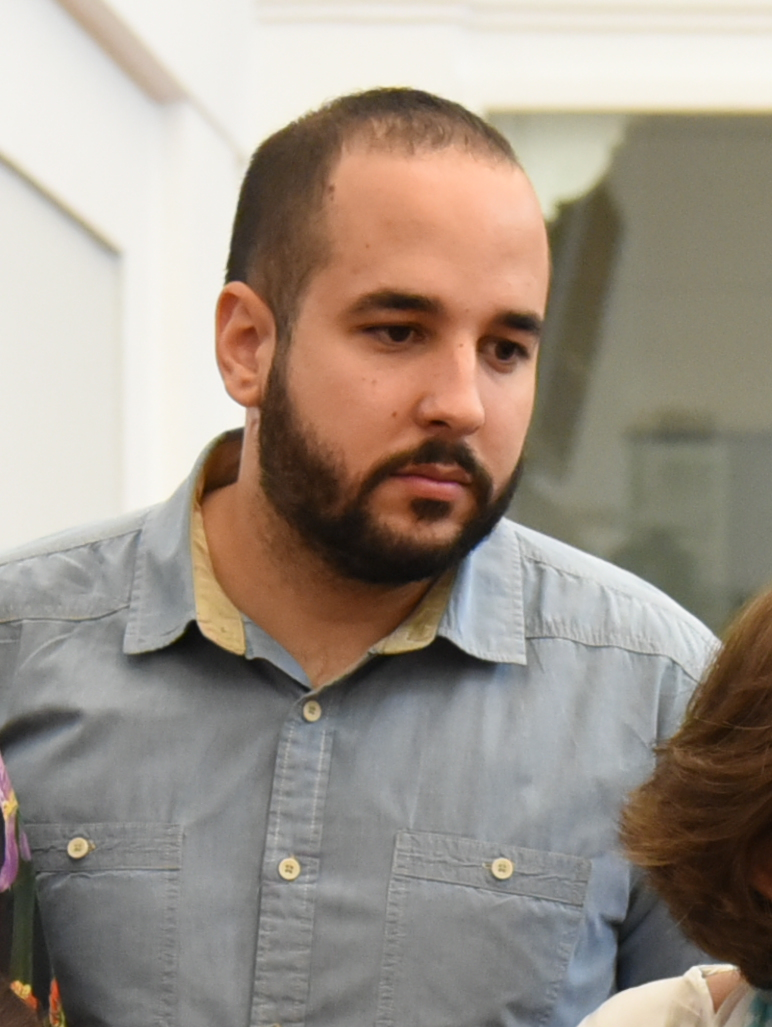
- González in 2017

Member of the Congress of Deputies
- In office 21 May 2019 – 30 May 2023
- Constituency: Ciudad Real

Personal details
- Born: 6 May 1991 (age 34)
- Party: Spanish Socialist Workers' Party

Miguel Ángel González Caballero (born 6 May 1991) is a Spanish politician. From 2019 to 2023, he was a member of the Congress of Deputies. From 2015 to 2019, he was a member of the Cortes of Castilla–La Mancha.
