= Otacílio Neto (footballer) =

Brazilian footballer (born 1982)

Personal information
- Full name: Otacílio Mariano Neto
- Date of birth: 17 November 1982 (age 43)
- Place of birth: Orós, Brazil
- Height: 1.80 m (5 ft 11 in)
- Position: Forward

Team information
- Current team: Blumenau Esporte Clube

Youth career
- Ituano

Senior career*
Years	Team	Apps	(Gls)
2001–2003	Ituano		
2004	Osasco FC		
2004–2008	Noroeste	14	(1)
2004	→ Portuguesa (loan)	0	(0)
2005	→ Oeste (loan)		
2005	→ Barretos (loan)		
2007	→ Figueirense (loan)	25	(7)
2008–2012	Corinthians	9	(0)
2009	→ Grêmio Barueri (loan)	20	(1)
2010	→ Ponte Preta (loan)	1	(0)
2010	→ Goiás (loan)	14	(1)
2011	→ Noroeste (loan)		
2011	→ Bragantino (loan)	12	(4)
2012	→ Ituano (loan)	0	(0)
2013	Botafogo-SP	0	(0)
2014	Rio Branco-SP		
2014	Colo Colo		
2015	Ypiranga de Erechim		
2015	Guarani de Juazeiro		
2015–2016	Sete de Dourados		
2017	Floresta		
2018–	Iguatu		
- * Club domestic league appearances and goals

Otacílio Mariano Neto (born 17 November 1982), known as Otacílio Neto or just Otacílio, is a Brazilian football attacker, who plays for Iguatu.

== Biography ==
Born in Orós, Ceará, Otacílio Neto started his career at Ituano of São Paulo state. He then left for Osasco FC and in July 2004 signed by Noroeste.

=== Noroeste ===
He then loaned to Portuguesa, Oeste and Barretos. On 1 July 2005 he returned to Noroeste. In December 2005, he signed a contract extension, which last until December 2006. He played twice in national cup that season. In June 2006 he extended his contract again, which last until December 2007. He finished as the last 16 (third stage) in 2006 Campeonato Brasileiro Série C with Noroeste He played 14 out of possible 18 matches, scored once. In 2007 season he played 3 times in the national cup, and scored 7 goals in 17 appearances at 2007 Campeonato Paulista. He finished as the runner-up at 2007 Campeonato Paulista do Interior. After renewed his contract with club in June 2007, he was loaned to Figueirense. He made his Campeonato Brasileiro Série A debut with the Santa Catarina side, played 25 league matches. He also played twice in 2007 Copa Sudamericana first round.

In February 2008 he renewed his contract again which last until December 2009. He was the team top-scorer at 2008 Campeonato Paulista, scored 10 goals in the first 12 games of the state league, including a hat-trick against Ituano on 27 January 2008. However, he did not play the rest of the matches, as he was injured during training. The team finished as the runner-up again in 2008 Campeonato Paulista do Interior.

=== Corinthians ===
In August 2008 he was signed by Corinthians Paulista for R$ 675,000 on a 4-year contract., which the club acquired 40% economic rights and the rest was owned by an investor "Luis Fernando Assessoria Esportiva". Corinthians later bought more economic rights and cost an additional R$575,000.

He won 2008 Campeonato Brasileiro Série B with team. He made his league debut on 16 September 2008 and played 6 times in Série B.

After played for the team at 2009 Campeonato Paulista (3 goals in 13 games), 2009 Brazilian Cup (5 games) and 3 games in 2009 Série A, he was loaned to league rival Grêmio Barueri in July.

In January 2010, he was loaned to Ponte Preta, He scored 2 goals for the team at 2010 Campeonato Paulista. He played 13 times (all start) in the state league and infamously cautioned 10 times and sent off once (after cautioned second time on 20 February, round 10). The team finished as the semi-finalists in 2010 Campeonato Paulista do Interior. He played his only match at 2010 Campeonato Brasileiro Série B on 15 May.

In June left for Goiás, rejoining Wellington Saci. Noroeste also wanted to re-sign Otacílio in October 2010. He played for Goiás at 2010 Copa Sudamericana semi-finals (both legs) and finals (both legs), scored once in the final first leg. The team losing to Independiente after penalty shootout, which Otacílio Neto already substituted by Éverton Santos due to injury.

On 3 January 2011 he was confirmed as a player of Noroeste. On 30 June 2011 he joined Bragantino in a 5-month loan.

== Honours ==
Ituano

- Campeonato Brasileiro Série C: 2003

Noroeste

- Copa Paulista: 2005
- Campeonato Paulista do Interior: 2007, 2008

Corinthians

- Campeonato Brasileiro Série B: 2008
- Copa do Brasil: 2009
- Campeonato Paulista: 2009

Sete de Dourados

- Campeonato Sul-Mato-Grossense: 2016
