= Daniel Salvatierra =

Argentine footballer

Personal information
- Full name: Daniel Alberto Salvatierra
- Date of birth: 23 February 1990 (age 36)
- Place of birth: Rosario, Argentina
- Height: 1.76 m (5 ft 9 in)
- Position: Forward

Team information
- Current team: Sarmiento de Resistencia

Youth career
- Newell's Old Boys

Senior career*
Years	Team	Apps	(Gls)
2010–2011	Newell's Old Boys	16	(0)
2011–2012	Atlético Tucumán	23	(2)
2013–2014	Coronel Aguirre	25	(10)
2014–2017	Unión de Sunchales	58	(23)
2015	→ Tiro Federal (loan)	23	(1)
2017–	Unión de Sunchales	123	(37)
- * Club domestic league appearances and goals as of 14:20, 14 August 2022 (UTC)

Daniel Alberto Salvatierra (born 23 February 1990) is an Argentine football central forward currently playing for Sarmiento of Resistencia, Chaco.

== Club career ==
Salvatierra made his professional debut for Newell's in December 2010 against Liga de Quito. At the end of the season, he was released and joined Atlético Tucumán in Primera B Nacional. In 2013, he signed for Coronel Aguirre, but he was released in 2014. In 2015, he joined Tiro Federal playing in the Torneo Federal A, but his club was relegated. He was transferred to Unión de Sunchales in 2016.
