= Rodrigo Marangoni =

Argentine footballer

Personal information
- Full name: Rodrigo Daniel Marangoni
- Date of birth: 21 February 1978 (age 48)
- Place of birth: Paraná, Entre Ríos, Argentina
- Height: 1.74 m (5 ft 9 in)
- Position: Attacking midfielder

Team information
- Current team: Deportes Antofagasta

Senior career*
Years	Team	Apps	(Gls)
1997–1998	Vélez Sársfield	18 total	(1)
1998	→ Atlanta (loan)	14	(2)
1999–2000	Vélez Sársfield	(see above)	
2000–2001	Arsenal de Sarandí	7	(1)
2001–2002	Almirante Brown (A)	26	(1)
2002–2003	Aurora	66	(27)
2003–2004	Douglas Haig	16	(4)
2004–2006	Guillermo Brown	59	(16)
2006–2008	Atlético Huila	66	(17)
2008–2010	Deportes Tolima	42	(14)
2011	Barcelona	13	(4)
2011	Gimnasia (LP)	7	(0)
2012	Deportes Antofagasta	0	(0)
2012–2013	Atlético Huila	11	(1)
- * Club domestic league appearances and goals as of 7 December 2012

Rodrigo Daniel Marangoni (born February 21, 1978, in Paraná, Entre Ríos Province) is a former Argentine football midfielder who played for last time in Atlético Huila. He has been described as player of good passing skills and a freekick specialist.

== Club career ==
Marangoni started his professional career in 1997 with Vélez Sársfield. The following year he was loaned to second division club Atlanta, but shortly after he returned to Vélez. In 2000, he joined Arsenal de Sarandí, but left the club after making only seven first-team appearances.

In 2001, Marangoni spent some time with Almirante Brown de Arrecifes. In 2002, he moved to Bolivia and signed for Aurora. During his spell in the Liga de Fútbol Profesional Boliviano, he became a fundamental figure for the club scoring 27 goals in 66 games. In 2003, Marangoni returned to Argentina joining Douglas Haig before transferring to Club Guillermo Brown a year later. In 2006, he relocated to Colombia, where he wore the colors of first division club Atlético Huila. His impressive displays awoke the interest of Deportes Tolima, which signed him in 2008.
