= Damián Cirillo =

Argentine footballer

Personal information
- Date of birth: 17 January 1980 (age 46)
- Place of birth: San Isidro, Buenos Aires, Argentina
- Height: 1.85 m (6 ft 1 in)
- Position: Forward

Senior career*
Years	Team	Apps	(Gls)
1997–2000	Tigre	19	(2)
2000–2001	Temperley	34	(5)
2001–2002	Atlético Uruguay	38	(18)
2002	Defensa y Justicia	7	(0)
2003–2007	FC Locarno	121	(55)
2008	Atlético Bucaramanga	6	(3)
2008–2009	Juventud Antoniana	16	(3)
2009	Sportivo Belgrano	12	(1)
2010	Universitario	36	(9)
2011	Los Andes	7	(0)
2011	Sol de América	1	(0)
2011–2012	UAI Urquiza	14	(1)
2012	Talleres (RE)	16	(2)
2013	Sarmiento (R)	11	(1)
2013–2014	Club Social y Deportivo Alianza	23	(11)
2015	Club Atlético Colegiales	7	(1)
2017	Independiente Fontana	12	(9)
2017	Club Deportivo El León	3	(0)
Total		383	(121)
- * Club domestic league appearances and goals

Damián Cirillo (born 17 January 1980 in San Isidro, Argentina) is an Argentine former professional footballer who played as a forward.

== Clubs ==
- Tigre 1997–2000
- Temperley 2000–2001
- Atlético Uruguay 2001–2002
- Defensa y Justicia 2002
- FC Locarno 2003–2007
- Atlético Bucaramanga 2008
- Juventud Antoniana 2008–2009
- Sportivo Belgrano 2009
- Universitario 2010
- Los Andes 2011
- Sol de América 2011
- UAI Urquiza 2011–2012
- Talleres (RE) 2012
- Sarmiento (R) 2013–2013
- Club Social y Deportivo Alianza 2013–2014
- Club Atlético Colegiales (Concordia) 2015
- Independiente Fontana 2017
- Club Deportivo El León 2017
