= Andrés Silvera =

Argentine footballer

Personal information
- Full name: Néstor Andrés Silvera
- Date of birth: March 14, 1977 (age 49)
- Place of birth: Comodoro Rivadavia, Argentina
- Height: 1.85 m (6 ft 1 in)
- Position: Striker

Youth career
- C.A.I.

Senior career*
Years	Team	Apps	(Gls)
1994–1997	C.A.I.	39	(19)
1998–1999	Huracán	29	(6)
1999–2001	Unión	67	(21)
2001–2003	Independiente	58	(22)
2003–2006	Tigres UANL	78	(45)
2006–2009	San Lorenzo	90	(37)
2009–2011	Independiente	64	(18)
2011–2012	Belgrano	22	(2)
2012–2013	Banfield	29	(3)
2013–2014	C.A.I.	--	(--)
- * Club domestic league appearances and goals

Néstor Andrés Silvera (born 14 March 1977) is a former Argentine football striker. He has played for a number of other clubs in the Argentine Primera División, as well as Tigres UANL in Mexico.

With 45 goals, Silvera is the fifth all-time highest goalscorer of Tigres UANL.

== Playing & Managing Career ==
Silvera began his career in 1994 with his hometown team Comisión de Actividades Infantiles. He played for them in the lower leagues for 3 seasons, before transferring to Huracán in the Argentine Primera División. After one season, he moved on to Unión.

In 2001, Silvera was signed by Independiente. During the 2002 Apertura tournament he played an important role in helping Independiente claim their first Argentine league title in eight years. He was the top scorer of the tournament with 16 goals.

In 2003, Silvera was sold to Mexican side Tigres UANL, where he became top scorer in the Primera División de México for the 2004 Clausura tournament.

In 2006, he returned to Argentine football with San Lorenzo, and in 2007 he helped the club to win the Clausura tournament.

In 2009, Silvera returned to Independiente. He was part of the team that ended up as champion of the 2010 Copa Sudamericana.

In 2011, Silvera joined Belgrano de Córdoba.

In 2017 he joined Al-Hilal FC technical staff as a second assistant coach for the first football team.

== Titles ==
Independiente

- Argentine Primera División (1): 2002 Apertura
- Copa Sudamericana (1): 2010

Tigres UANL

- InterLiga (2): 2005, 2006

San Lorenzo

- Argentine Primera División (1): 2007 Clausura

== Individual honours ==
- Goleador (top scorer), Primera Division: Apertura 2002.
- Goleador (top scorer) Primera División de México: Clausura 2004.
