= Cristian García (footballer, born 1988) =

Argentine footballer

Ruso García
Personal information
- Full name: Cristian Andrés García
- Date of birth: 29 April 1988 (age 38)
- Place of birth: San Rafael, Argentina
- Height: 1.82 m (6 ft 0 in)
- Position: Forward

Team information
- Current team: Manta

Senior career*
Years	Team	Apps	(Gls)
2007–2011	Banfield	54	(10)
2011–2013	Murcia	63	(16)
2013–2014	Godoy Cruz	11	(0)
2014	Tenerife	4	(0)
2015–2016	Colón	15	(1)
2016	Concordia Chiajna	11	(0)
2016–2017	Quilmes	4	(1)
2017	Gimnasia Jujuy	8	(0)
2017–2018	Deportivo Madryn	9	(0)
2018	Juventud Antoniana	4	(1)
2019	Sportivo Italiano		
2019–	Manta		
- * Club domestic league appearances and goals as of 18 March 2019

Cristian 'Ruso' Andrés García (born 29 April 1988) is an Argentine professional footballer who plays as a forward for Manta.

== Football career ==
Born in San Rafael, Mendoza, García began his senior career with Club Atlético Banfield, making his competitive debut on 3 June 2007 against Gimnasia y Esgrima de Jujuy, coming on as an 85th-minute substitute in a 1–0 away win. He made his first start for the club two weeks later, in a 0–3 defeat at Club Atlético Belgrano.

García scored his first goal for Banfield in a 2–1 home win against Newell's Old Boys on 7 November 2008. During the 2009 Apertura tournament he only made a few appearances, but made an important contribution by netting twice in a 3–0 home win against reigning champions Club Atlético Vélez Sársfield on 14 November, as El Taladro won the first national championship in its history in the final day of the season.

== Honours ==
Banfield

- Argentine Primera División: Apertura 2009
