= Víctor López (footballer, born 1978) =

Argentine footballer

Personal information
- Full name: Víctor Rubén López
- Date of birth: 19 December 1978 (age 47)
- Place of birth: Córdoba, Argentina
- Height: 1.81 m (5 ft 11 in)
- Position: Centre back

Senior career*
Years	Team	Apps	(Gls)
1998–2000	Racing (Córdoba)	39	(1)
2000–2004	Talleres (Córdoba)	93	(0)
2004–2006	Arsenal de Sarandí	78	(0)
2007–2008	Real Sociedad	31	(1)
2008–2011	Banfield	101	(8)
2012–2015	Newell's	86	(3)
2016	Atletico Rafaela	10	(0)
2016	Olimpo	14	(2)
2017-2019	Instituto	52	(3)
- * Club domestic league appearances and goals as of 25 March 2019

Víctor Rubén López (born 19 December 1978) is an Argentine former footballer who last played for Instituto de Córdoba in the Primera B Nacional. His usual position was centre back.

== Career ==
López started his professional career at Racing de Córdoba in the lower leagues of Argentine football, in 1998. In 2000, he joined Talleres de Córdoba who were in the Argentine Primera División at the time. In 2004, Talleres was relegated and López joined Arsenal de Sarandí.

In 2007, López joined Real Sociedad in Spain, where he suffered relegation for the 2nd time in his career at the end of the 2006–2007 season.

In 2008, López returned to Argentina to play for Banfield. In Banfield, he was a key member of the squad that won the Argentine championship for the first time in the history of the club, featuring in every game of the Apertura 2009 championship and scoring a key goal in the 18th round against Tigre.

In 2016, López joined Atletico Rafaela to play at the orders of Jorge Burruchaga.

== Honours ==
Banfield

- Primera División: Apertura 2009

Newell's Old Boys

- Primera División: 2013 Final
