= Ángel Vildozo =

Argentine footballer

Personal information
- Full name: Luis Ángel Vildozo
- Date of birth: 9 December 1981 (age 44)
- Place of birth: San Juan, Argentina
- Height: 1.83 m (6 ft 0 in)
- Position: Striker

Youth career
- –2001: Renato Cesarini

Senior career*
Years	Team	Apps	(Gls)
2001–2005	All Boys	118	(28)
2005–2006	Comunicaciones	36	(14)
2006–2007	All Boys	2	(0)
2007–2008	Comunicaciones	40	(20)
2008	Unión Española	9	(1)
2009	Unión San Felipe	35	(25)
2010	Centro Deportivo Olmedo	11	(1)
2010	Unión San Felipe	16	(11)
2011–2012	Colegiales	50	(26)
2012–2013	All Boys	31	(7)
2013–2015	Aldosivi	64	(13)
2016–2017	All Boys	17	(0)
2017–2018	Comunicaciones	41	(8)
2019	Unión San Felipe	10	(1)
Total		480	(155)
- * Club domestic league appearances and goals

Luis Ángel Vildozo (born 9 December 1981) is an Argentine former professional footballer who played as a forward.

Vildozo retired from professional football on 20 July 2019.

== Honours ==
=== Club ===
Unión San Felipe

- Primera B : 2009
- Copa Chile: 2009
