= Rafael Moura =

Brazilian footballer (born 1983)

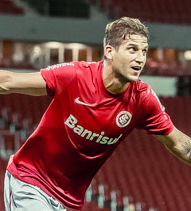
- Rafael playing for Internacional in 2014.

Personal information
- Full name: Rafael Martiniano de Miranda Moura
- Date of birth: 23 May 1983 (age 43)
- Place of birth: Belo Horizonte, Brazil
- Height: 1.89 m (6 ft 2 in)
- Position: Striker

Youth career
- Atlético Mineiro

Senior career*
Years	Team	Apps	(Gls)
2004	Atlético Mineiro	2	(0)
2004–2005	Vitória	4	(1)
2005	Paysandu	14	(7)
2006	Corinthians	43	(15)
2007	Locarno	4	(1)
2007–2012	Fluminense	57	(22)
2007–2008	→ Lorient (loan)	2	(0)
2008–2009	→ Atlético Paranaense (loan)	28	(9)
2010	→ Goiás (loan)	25	(9)
2012–2015	Internacional	92	(24)
2016–2017	Atlético Mineiro	35	(9)
2016	→ Figueirense (loan)	33	(10)
2018	América Mineiro	38	(9)
2019–2021	Goiás	58	(21)
2021	Botafogo	31	(1)
- * Club domestic league appearances and goals as of 14:31, 6 February 2022 (UTC)

Rafael Martiniano de Miranda Moura (born 23 May 1983), or simply Rafael Moura, is a former Brazilian footballer who played as a striker.

== Career ==
Rafael Moura started his career with Atlético Mineiro, he then left for Vitória.

In July 2005, he left for Paysandu, signed a contract until the end of season.

Rafael Moura signed a contract with MSI in 2006 which lasted until 2012, he then left for MSI affiliated club Corinthians. In January 2007 he left for Swiss lower division club Locarno along with Jhonny Herrera but still under MSI control. He signed an 8-month contract with Fluminense in January 2007.

Moura left for French Ligue 1 side FC Lorient on a 1-year loan from Fluminense (actually MSI) in August 2007. Lorient had a first option to sign him outright in June 2008.

On 1 July 2008, Moura returned to Brazil for Atlético Paranaense, signed a 2-year loan contract.

The loan terminated in January 2010, and Moura signed a 1-year loan deal with Goiás on 22 January.

After an on-pitch brawl on 21 July 2010, the match that Goiás 2–2 draw with his former club Vitória, Moura was provisionally banned from football for a month. He finished as the runner-up with team at 2010 Copa Sudamericana.

In January 2011, he rejoined Fluminense and signed a 3-year deal. Moves to Internacional and Atlético Mineiro followed. In 2016, not long after joining Atlético Mineiro, Moura completed a loan move to Figueirense.

In December 2017, after terminating his contract with Atlético, Moura joined América Mineiro.

== Honours ==
Vitória

- Campeonato Baiano: 2005

Fluminense

- Copa do Brasil: 2007
- Campeonato Carioca: 2012

Atlético Paranaense

- Campeonato Paranaense: 2009

Internacional

- Campeonato Gaúcho: 2013, 2014, 2015

Atlético Mineiro

- Campeonato Mineiro: 2017

Botafogo

- Campeonato Brasileiro Série B: 2021
