= Leandro Gracián =

Argentine footballer

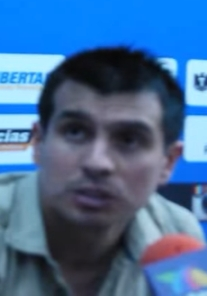
- Gracián in 2013

Personal information
- Date of birth: 6 August 1982 (age 44)
- Place of birth: Buenos Aires, Argentina
- Height: 1.70 m (5 ft 7 in)
- Position: Attacking midfielder

Team information
- Current team: Quilmes (manager)

Youth career
- 1993–2000: Vélez Sársfield

Senior career*
Years	Team	Apps	(Gls)
2001–2006	Vélez Sársfield	136	(25)
2006–2007	Monterrey	33	(10)
2007–2012	Boca Juniors	58	(8)
2009	→ Aris (loan)	12	(0)
2010–2011	→ Independiente (loan)	33	(1)
2012	→ Colón (loan)	7	(0)
2012–2013	Cobreloa	22	(3)
2013–2015	Querétaro	7	(1)
2015	Manta	7	(0)
2015–2016	Deportivo Santaní	18	(4)
2016	Cúcuta Deportivo	6	(1)
2016–2017	Rubio Ñu	12	(3)
2017	San Martín Tucumán	5	(1)
Total		356	(57)

Managerial career
- 2024–2025: Deportivo Madryn
- 2026–: Quilmes
- * Club domestic league appearances and goals

Leandro Gracián (born 6 August 1982) is an Argentine retired football manager and former player who played as an attacking midfielder. He is the current manager of Quilmes.

== Career ==
=== Vélez Sarsfield ===
Gracián started his professional career with Vélez Sársfield where he was part of the team that won the Clausura 2005 tournament.

=== Monterrey ===
In 2006 Gracián joined Mexican Club de Futbol Monterrey.

=== Boca Juniors ===
In mid-2007, he joined Boca Juniors.

==== Loan spells ====
On 2 June 2009, Gracián moved out on loan to Aris Thessaloniki for 1 year, this being the first time he will compete in the European continent.

In January 2010 Boca Juniors loaned their attacking midfielder to Club Atlético Independiente until June 2010. The 27-year-old then returned from a loan spell in Greece at Aris Thessaloniki. On 7 January 2012, Gracián was sent to Colón de Santa Fe on a six-month loan deal.

=== Cobreloa ===
In mid-2012, as a free agent he signed for Cobreloa.

=== Querétaro ===
On 12 July 2013, Gracián joined the Mexican side Querétaro.

== Honours ==
=== Club ===
Vélez Sársfield

- Torneo de Clausura (1): 2005

Boca Juniors

- Recopa Sudamericana (1): 2008
- Torneo de Apertura (2): 2008, 2011

Independiente

- Copa Sudamericana (1): 2010
