= Félix Noguera =

Colombian footballer (born 1987)

Personal information
- Full name: Félix Enrique Noguera Collante
- Date of birth: 31 March 1987 (age 39)
- Place of birth: Santa Marta, Colombia
- Height: 1.78 m (5 ft 10 in)
- Position: Left back

Team information
- Current team: Atlético Junior
- Number: 24

Senior career*
Years	Team	Apps	(Gls)
2007—2009	Deportivo Pereira		
2010	Independiente Santa Fe		
2011–2014	Deportes Tolima		
2015–	Atlético Junior	31	(1)
- * Club domestic league appearances and goals as of 19 February 2017 (UTC)

Félix Enrique Noguera Collante (born 31 March 1987) is a Colombian footballer who plays as a left back for Atlético Junior in the Categoría Primera A.
