= Aquilino Villalba =

Paraguayan footballer (born 1983)

Personal information
- Full name: Aquilino Villalba Sanabria
- Date of birth: 20 September 1983 (age 43)
- Place of birth: Asunción, Paraguay
- Height: 1.84 m (6 ft 0 in)
- Position: Striker

Team information
- Current team: Carabobo

Youth career
- Olimpia Asunción

Senior career*
Years	Team	Apps	(Gls)
2003–2005	Gimnasia de Jujuy	54	(10)
2005	Atlético de Rafaela	13	(0)
2006	Racing de Córdoba	15	(4)
2006	Gimnasia de Jujuy	3	(0)
2007	Olimpia Asunción	1	(0)
2007	Sportivo Patria	10	(5)
2008	Aurora	28	(8)
2009	Bolívar	26	(7)
2010	San José	11	(2)
2011–2013	Aurora	58	(10)
2013	Cerro Porteño PF	17	(4)
2014	Rubio Ñu	8	(0)
2014–2015	San Lorenzo	3	(0)
2015–2017	Sport Loreto	15	(0)
2017–	Carabobo	0	(0)
- * Club domestic league appearances and goals as of 5 February 2017 (UTC)

Aquilino Villalba Sanabria (born 20 September 1983, in Asunción) is a Paraguayan football striker currently playing for Carabobo.

In 2008, Villalba helped Aurora obtain the Bolivian Championship after scoring three goals in the 2008 clausura finals against Blooming, giving the club its first title in 43 years. Due to his good performance at Aurora, Villalba was signed by Club Bolívar for the 2009 season.

== Club titles ==
Season	Club	Title
2008 (C)	Aurora	Liga de Fútbol Profesional Boliviano
2009 (A)	Bolívar	Liga de Fútbol Profesional Boliviano
