= Wilder Medina =

Colombian footballer (born 1981)

Personal information
- Full name: Wilder Andrés Medina Tamayo
- Date of birth: 21 February 1981 (age 45)
- Place of birth: Puerto Nare, Colombia
- Height: 1.80 m (5 ft 11 in)
- Position: Striker

Senior career*
Years	Team	Apps	(Gls)
2003	Deportivo Rionegro		
2004	Atlético Huila		
2005	Envigado		
2006–2007	Patriotas	47+	(30)
2008–2011	Deportes Tolima	86	(43)
2013	Santa Fe	19	(12)
2013	Barcelona SC	10	(3)
2014	→ Santa Fe (loan)	30	(11)
2015	→ Real Cartagena (loan)	6	(1)
2015–2016	Sport Boys Warnes	15	(3)
2016–2017	Fortaleza	9	(3)
- * Club domestic league appearances and goals as of 10 February 2018

Wilder Andrés Medina Tamayo (born 21 February 1981) is a retired Colombian footballer.

== Club career ==
In 1999, while playing for the youth academy of Deportivo Rionegro, he received a sanction for a positive drug test.

In May 2011, Medina received a three-month suspension for testing positive for marijuana. During the period where he was suspended, he submitted to rehab for addiction. A few months later, in September 2011, Medina received a one-year doping ban and a US$2,800 (5.35 million COL) fine stemming from positive drug tests.

Medina played until 2013 for clubs in Colombia: Deportivo Rionegro in 2003, Atlético Huila in 2004, Envigado in 2005, Patriotas of Primera B in 2006–2007, where he was top scorer, and was transferred to Deportes Tolima, where he scored the 3000th goal of the club's history.

During the Apertura 2013, Wilder Medina played with Independiente Santa Fe and scored lots of goals, including the one he scored against Grêmio in the knockout stages of the Copa Libertadores, where he also earned the man of the match award. With Santa Fe, he scored 16 goals, 12 in the league and four in the Copa Libertadores.

Medina was acquired by Barcelona Sporting Club and made his debut on 1 August 2013 in the Copa Sudamericana match against Atlético Club Mineros de Guayana.

== Honours ==
Santa Fe

- Categoría Primera A (1): 2014–II
- Superliga Colombiana (1): 2013
