= 2012 Copa Libertadores second stage =

The second stage of the 2012 Copa Santander Libertadores de América ran from February 7 to April 19, 2012 (match days: February 7–9, 14–16, 21–23, March 6–8, 13–15, 20–22, 27–29, April 3–5, 10–12, 17–19).

== Format ==
Twenty-six teams qualified directly into this round, to be joined by the six winners of the first stage. The thirty-two teams were drawn into eight groups of four on November 25, 2011, in Asunción.

The teams in each group played each other in a double round-robin format, playing the other teams in the group once at home and once away. Each team earned 3 points for a win, 1 point for a draw, and 0 points for a loss. The following criteria were used for breaking ties on points:

1. Goal difference
2. Goals scored
3. Away goals
4. Drawing of lots

The top two teams from each group advanced to the round of 16.

== Groups ==
=== Group 1 ===
Pos	Team	Pld	W	D	L	GF	GA	GD	Pts	SAN	INT	STR	AUR
1	(Brazil) Santos	6	4	1	1	12	5	+7	13		3–1	2–0	2–0
2	(Brazil) Internacional	6	2	2	2	10	6	+4	8	1–1		5–0	2–0
3	(Bolivia) The Strongest	6	2	1	3	5	11	−6	7	2–1	1–1		2–1
4	(Peru) Juan Aurich	6	2	0	4	4	9	−5	6	1–3	1–0	1–0	

Legend: Blue = home team win; Yellow = draw; Red = away team win.
February 9, 2012
20:00 UTC−02:00

Internacional (Brazil)	2–0	(Peru) Juan Aurich
Oscar 23'; Dátolo 89'	Report

Estádio José Pinheiro Borda (Beira-Rio), Porto Alegre
Attendance: 28,968
Referee: Líber Prudente (Uruguay)
February 15, 2012
17:55 UTC−04:00

The Strongest (Bolivia)	2–1	(Brazil) Santos
Cristaldo 33'; Ramallo 90'	Report	Henrique 9'

Estadio Hernando Siles, La Paz
Referee: Carlos Vera (Ecuador)

February 23, 2012
20:45 UTC−04:00

The Strongest (Bolivia)	2–1	(Peru) Juan Aurich
S. González 26'; Escobar 76'	Report	Vaca 23' (o.g.)

Estadio Hernando Siles, La Paz
Referee: Federico Beligoy (Argentina)
March 7, 2012
19:45 UTC−03:00

Santos (Brazil)	3–1	(Brazil) Internacional
Neymar 18' (pen.), 53', 64'	Report	Leandro Damião 63'

Estádio Urbano Caldeira (Vila Belmiro), Santos
Attendance: 12,857
Referee: Evandro Roman (Brazil)

March 13, 2012
22:00 UTC−03:00

Internacional (Brazil)	5–0	(Bolivia) The Strongest
Dagoberto 3'; Leandro Damião 6', 56', 72'; Jô 80'	Report

Estádio José Pinheiro Borda (Beira-Rio), Porto Alegre
Attendance: 25,098
Referee: Antonio Arias (Paraguay)
March 15, 2012
17:45 UTC−05:00

Juan Aurich (Peru)	1–3	(Brazil) Santos
Tejada 14'	Report	Fucile 35'; Ganso 39'; Borges 68'

Estadio Elías Aguirre, Chiclayo
Referee: Roberto Silvera (Uruguay)

March 21, 2012
18:45 UTC−04:00

The Strongest (Bolivia)	1–1	(Brazil) Internacional
Ramallo 46'	Report	Gilberto 88'

Estadio Hernando Siles, La Paz
Referee: Omar Ponce (Ecuador)
March 22, 2012
22:00 UTC−03:00

Santos (Brazil)	2–0	(Peru) Juan Aurich
Edu Dracena 15'; Neymar 58'	Report

Estádio Municipal Paulo Machado de Carvalho (Pacaembu), São Paulo
Attendance: 26,829
Referee: Patricio Loustau (Argentina)

April 4, 2012
21:50 UTC−03:00

Internacional (Brazil)	1–1	(Brazil) Santos
Nei 8'	Report	Alan Kardec 64'

Estádio José Pinheiro Borda (Beira-Rio), Porto Alegre
Attendance: 35,530
Referee: Sandro Ricci (Brazil)
April 5, 2012
20:30 UTC−05:00

Juan Aurich (Peru)	1–0	(Bolivia) The Strongest
Aráujo 20'	Report

Estadio Elías Aguirre, Chiclayo
Referee: Alfredo Intriago (Ecuador)

April 19, 2012
17:45 UTC−05:00

Juan Aurich (Peru)	1–0	(Brazil) Internacional
Tejada 14'	Report

Estadio Elías Aguirre, Chiclayo
Referee: Marlon Escalante (Venezuela)
April 19, 2012
19:45 UTC−03:00

Santos (Brazil)	2–0	(Bolivia) The Strongest
Alan Kardec 85'; Neymar 87'	Report

Estádio Urbano Caldeira (Vila Belmiro), Santos
Attendance: 11,761
Referee: Julio Quintana (Paraguay)

=== Group 2 ===
Pos	Team	Pld	W	D	L	GF	GA	GD	Pts	LAN	EME	FLA	OLI
1	(Argentina) Lanús	6	3	1	2	11	6	+5	10		1–0	1–1	6–0
2	(Ecuador) Emelec	6	3	0	3	7	8	−1	9	0–2		3–2	1–0
3	(Brazil) Flamengo	6	2	2	2	12	10	+2	8	3–0	1–0		3–3
4	(Paraguay) Olimpia	6	2	1	3	10	16	−6	7	2–1	2–3	3–2	

Legend: Blue = home team win; Yellow = draw; Red = away team win.
February 9, 2012
21:30 UTC−05:00

Emelec (Ecuador)	1–0	(Paraguay) Olimpia
Figueroa 50' (pen.)	Report

Estadio George Capwell, Guayaquil
Referee: Wilmar Roldán (Colombia)
February 15, 2012
21:00 UTC−03:00

Lanús (Argentina)	1–1	(Brazil) Flamengo
Carranza 74'	Report	Léo Moura 45'

Estadio Ciudad de Lanús, Lanús
Attendance: 20,000
Referee: Roberto Silvera (Uruguay)

February 23, 2012
19:30 UTC−03:00

Olimpia (Paraguay)	2–1	(Argentina) Lanús
Marín 24'; Biancucchi 79'	Report	Araujo 71'

Estadio Dr. Nicolás Léoz, Asunción
Referee: Darío Ubriaco (Uruguay)
March 8, 2012
19:30 UTC−03:00

Flamengo (Brazil)	1–0	(Ecuador) Emelec
Vágner Love 48'	Report

Estádio Olímpico João Havelange (Engenhão), Rio de Janeiro
Attendance: 31,859
Referee: Darío Ubriaco (Uruguay)

March 13, 2012
19:45 UTC−03:00

Lanús (Argentina)	1–0	(Ecuador) Emelec
Pavone 71'	Report

Estadio Ciudad de Lanús, Lanús
Referee: Víctor Hugo Carrillo (Peru)
March 15, 2012
22:00 UTC−03:00

Flamengo (Brazil)	3–3	(Paraguay) Olimpia
Bottinelli 37'; Ronaldinho 56' (pen.); Luiz Antônio 63'	Report	Zeballos 76'; L. Caballero 84'; Marín 88'

Estádio Olímpico João Havelange (Engenhão), Rio de Janeiro
Attendance: 30,755
Referee: José Buitrago (Colombia)

March 20, 2012
18:15 UTC−05:00

Emelec (Ecuador)	0–2	(Argentina) Lanús
	Report	Regueiro 5', 87' (pen.)

Estadio George Capwell, Guayaquil
Referee: Enrique Osses (Chile)
March 28, 2012
22:00 UTC−03:00

Olimpia (Paraguay)	3–2	(Brazil) Flamengo
Órteman 6'; Zeballos 52'; Aranda 70'	Report	Vágner Love 48'; Bottinelli 77'

Estadio Defensores del Chaco, Asunción
Referee: Enrique Osses (Chile)

April 3, 2012
19:45 UTC−03:00

Lanús (Argentina)	6–0	(Paraguay) Olimpia
Pavone 13', 54'; Camonaresi 29'; Regueiro 70'; Valeri 77'; S. Romero 84'	Report

Estadio Ciudad de Lanús, Lanús
Referee: Víctor Rivera (Peru)
April 4, 2012
19:50 UTC−05:00

Emelec (Ecuador)	3–2	(Brazil) Flamengo
Figueroa 33', 82'; Gaibor 90' (pen.)	Report	Bagüí 8' (o.g.); Deivid 42'

Estadio George Capwell, Guayaquil
Referee: Martín Vázquez (Uruguay)

April 12, 2012
19:30 UTC−03:00

Flamengo (Brazil)	3–0	(Argentina) Lanús
Welinton 17'; Deivid 41'; Luiz Antônio 49'	Report

Estádio Olímpico João Havelange (Engenhão), Rio de Janeiro
Attendance: 15,932
Referee: Wilmar Roldán (Colombia)
April 12, 2012
18:30 UTC−04:00

Olimpia (Paraguay)	2–3	(Ecuador) Emelec
Castorino 45+1'; Zeballos 90+1'	Report	Mondaini 66'; Mena 87'; J. Quiñónez 90+2'

Estadio Defensores del Chaco, Asunción
Referee: Roberto Silvera (Uruguay)

=== Group 3 ===
Pos	Team	Pld	W	D	L	GF	GA	GD	Pts	UE	BOL	JUN	UC
1	(Chile) Unión Española	6	3	1	2	10	7	+3	10		2–1	2–0	1–1
2	(Bolivia) Bolívar	6	3	1	2	9	7	+2	10	1–3		2–1	3–0
3	(Colombia) Junior	6	2	1	3	8	8	0	7	2–1	0–1		3–0
4	(Chile) Universidad Católica	6	1	3	2	6	11	−5	6	2–1	1–1	2–2	

Legend: Blue = home team win; Yellow = draw; Red = away team win.
February 8, 2012
18:45 UTC−03:00

Unión Española (Chile)	2–0	(Colombia) Junior
E. Herrera 64'; Cordero 65'	Report

Estadio Santa Laura-Universidad SEK, Santiago
Referee: Julio Quintana (Paraguay)
February 9, 2012
21:15 UTC−03:00

Universidad Católica (Chile)	1–1	(Bolivia) Bolívar
Ovelar 43'	Report	Ferreira 37'

Estadio San Carlos de Apoquindo, Santiago
Referee: Patricio Loustau (Argentina)

February 21, 2012
20:30 UTC−04:00

Bolívar (Bolivia)	1–3	(Chile) Unión Española
E. Rodríguez 1'	Report	Díaz 62'; E. Herrera 66'; Pineda 84'

Estadio Hernando Siles, La Paz
Referee: Enrique Cáceres (Paraguay)
February 23, 2012
21:45 UTC−03:00

Universidad Católica (Chile)	2–2	(Colombia) Junior
Gutiérrez 19', 26'	Report	Hernández 52'; Quiñones 60'

Estadio San Carlos de Apoquindo, Santiago
Referee: Pablo Lunati (Argentina)

March 6, 2012
21:45 UTC−03:00

Unión Española (Chile)	1–1	(Chile) Universidad Católica
E. Herrera 45'	Report	Andía 38'

Estadio Santa Laura-Universidad SEK, Santiago
Referee: Claudio Puga (Chile)
March 8, 2012
22:00 UTC−05:00

Junior (Colombia)	0–1	(Bolivia) Bolívar
	Report	Ferreira 80'

Estadio Metropolitano Roberto Meléndez, Barranquilla
Referee: Juan Soto (Venezuela)

March 20, 2012
21:30 UTC−04:00

Bolívar (Bolivia)	2–1	(Colombia) Junior
Álvarez 30'; Campos 39'	Report	Ruiz 67'

Estadio Hernando Siles, La Paz
Referee: Víctor Rivera (Peru)
March 28, 2012
19:45 UTC−03:00

Universidad Católica (Chile)	2–1	(Chile) Unión Española
Ovelar 7'; Gazale 87'	Report	Villagra 85'

Estadio San Carlos de Apoquindo, Santiago
Referee: Patricio Polic (Chile)

April 4, 2012
19:50 UTC−05:00

Junior (Colombia)	3–0	(Chile) Universidad Católica
Vélez 45'; Páez 85'; Hernández 90'	Report

Estadio Metropolitano Roberto Meléndez, Barranquilla
Referee: Paulo Oliveira (Brazil)
April 10, 2012
20:45 UTC−03:00

Unión Española (Chile)	2–1	(Bolivia) Bolívar
Leal 17'; E. Herrera 66'	Report	Cantero 82'

Estadio Santa Laura-Universidad SEK, Santiago
Referee: Heber Lopes (Brazil)

April 17, 2012
20:30 UTC−05:00

Junior (Colombia)	2–1	(Chile) Unión Española
Cárdenas 22' (pen.); Páez 34' (pen.)	Report	Vecchio 12'

Estadio Metropolitano Roberto Meléndez, Barranquilla
Referee: Federico Beligoy (Argentina)
April 17, 2012
21:30 UTC−04:00

Bolívar (Bolivia)	3–0	(Chile) Universidad Católica
Frontini 1'; Flores 27'; Lizio 48'	Report

Estadio Hernando Siles, La Paz
Referee: Carlos Vera (Ecuador)

=== Group 4 ===
Pos	Team	Pld	W	D	L	GF	GA	GD	Pts	FLU	BOC	ARS	ZAM
1	(Brazil) Fluminense	6	5	0	1	7	4	+3	15		0–2	1–0	1–0
2	(Argentina) Boca Juniors	6	4	1	1	9	3	+6	13	1–2		2–0	2–0
3	(Argentina) Arsenal	6	2	0	4	6	7	−1	6	1–2	1–2		3–0
4	(Venezuela) Zamora	6	0	1	5	0	8	−8	1	0–1	0–0	0–1	

Legend: Blue = home team win; Yellow = draw; Red = away team win.
February 7, 2012
22:00 UTC−02:00

Fluminense (Brazil)	1–0	(Argentina) Arsenal
Fred 2'	Report

Estádio Olímpico João Havelange (Engenhão), Rio de Janeiro
Attendance: 28,928
Referee: Antonio Arias (Paraguay)
February 14, 2012
19:45 UTC−04:30

Zamora (Venezuela)	0–0	(Argentina) Boca Juniors
	Report

Estadio Agustín Tovar, Barinas
Referee: José Buitrago (Colombia)

February 21, 2012
21:30 UTC−03:00

Arsenal (Argentina)	3–0	(Venezuela) Zamora
Ortíz 1'; Carbonero 15'; Leguizamón 43'	Report

Estadio Julio Humberto Grondona, Sarandí
Referee: Enrique Osses (Chile)
March 7, 2012
22:00 UTC−03:00

Boca Juniors (Argentina)	1–2	(Brazil) Fluminense
Somoza 46'	Report	Fred 9'; Deco 54'

Estadio Alberto J. Armando (La Bombonera), Buenos Aires
Attendance: 47,769
Referee: Carlos Amarilla (Paraguay)

March 14, 2012
19:45 UTC−03:00

Arsenal (Argentina)	1–2	(Argentina) Boca Juniors
C. Rodríguez 9' (o.g.)	Report	Mouche 28'; Ledesma 67'

Estadio Julio Humberto Grondona, Sarandí
Referee: Pablo Lunati (Argentina)
March 14, 2012
19:45 UTC−03:00

Fluminense (Brazil)	1–0	(Venezuela) Zamora
Anderson 57'	Report

Estádio Olímpico João Havelange (Engenhão), Rio de Janeiro
Attendance: 24,481
Referee: Patricio Polic (Chile)

March 29, 2012
19:45 UTC−03:00

Boca Juniors (Argentina)	2–0	(Argentina) Arsenal
Ledesma 49'; Sánchez Miño 88'	Report

Estadio Alberto J. Armando (La Bombonera), Buenos Aires
Referee: Patricio Loustau (Argentina)
March 29, 2012
20:30 UTC−04:30

Zamora (Venezuela)	0–1	(Brazil) Fluminense
	Report	Rafael Sóbis 78'

Estadio Agustín Tovar, Barinas
Attendance: 10,000
Referee: Carlos Vera (Ecuador)

April 10, 2012
19:15 UTC−04:30

Zamora (Venezuela)	0–1	(Argentina) Arsenal
	Report	Caffa 29' (pen.)

Estadio Agustín Tovar, Barinas
Referee: Julio Quintana (Paraguay)
April 11, 2012
22:00 UTC−03:00

Fluminense (Brazil)	0–2	(Argentina) Boca Juniors
	Report	Cvitanich 33'; Sánchez Miño 74'

Estádio Olímpico João Havelange (Engenhão), Rio de Janeiro
Attendance: 36,263
Referee: Darío Ubriaco (Uruguay)

April 18, 2012
19:30 UTC−03:00

Arsenal (Argentina)	1–2	(Brazil) Fluminense
N. Aguirre 80'	Report	Carlinhos 34'; Rafael Moura 90+2'

Estadio Julio Humberto Grondona, Sarandí
Attendance: 5,000
Referee: Roberto Silvera (Uruguay)
April 18, 2012
19:30 UTC−03:00

Boca Juniors (Argentina)	2–0	(Venezuela) Zamora
Blandi 67'; Riquelme 74'	Report

Estadio Alberto J. Armando (La Bombonera), Buenos Aires
Referee: Raúl Orosco (Bolivia)

=== Group 5 ===
Pos	Team	Pld	W	D	L	GF	GA	GD	Pts	LIB	VAS	NAC	ALI
1	(Paraguay) Libertad	6	4	1	1	11	7	+4	13		1–1	2–1	4–1
2	(Brazil) Vasco da Gama	6	4	1	1	10	6	+4	13	2–0		1–2	3–2
3	(Uruguay) Nacional	6	2	0	4	5	7	−2	6	1–2	0–1		1–0
4	(Peru) Alianza Lima	6	1	0	5	6	12	−6	3	1–2	1–2	1–0	

Legend: Blue = home team win; Yellow = draw; Red = away team win.
February 8, 2012
22:00 UTC−02:00

Vasco da Gama (Brazil)	1–2	(Uruguay) Nacional
Alecsandro 73'	Report	Dedé 30' (o.g.); Sánchez 46'

Estádio São Januário, Rio de Janeiro
Attendance: 16,838
Referee: José Buitrago (Colombia)
February 9, 2012
21:25 UTC−03:00

Libertad (Paraguay)	4–1	(Peru) Alianza Lima
Civelli 46'; Aquino 66' (pen.); M. Caballero 78'; Ibáñez 90' (o.g.)	Report	Arroe 27'

Estadio Dr. Nicolás Léoz, Asunción
Referee: Martín Vázquez (Uruguay)

February 16, 2012
20:15 UTC−02:00

Nacional (Uruguay)	1–2	(Paraguay) Libertad
M. Aguirre 23'	Report	Samudio 58'; M. Caballero 63'

Estadio Gran Parque Central, Montevideo
Referee: Saúl Laverni (Argentina)
March 6, 2012
21:45 UTC−03:00

Vasco da Gama (Brazil)	3–2	(Peru) Alianza Lima
Ramos 20' (o.g.); Dedé 59'; Juninho Pernambucano 80' (pen.)	Report	Charquero 17'; Ibáñez 85'

Estádio São Januário, Rio de Janeiro
Attendance: 14,327
Referee: Diego Abal (Argentina)

March 13, 2012
20:00 UTC−05:00

Alianza Lima (Peru)	1–0	(Uruguay) Nacional
J. Fernández 15'	Report

Estadio Nacional, Lima
Referee: Wilmar Roldán (Colombia)
March 14, 2012
22:00 UTC−03:00

Libertad (Paraguay)	1–1	(Brazil) Vasco da Gama
Núñez 69'	Report	Diego Souza 16'

Estadio Dr. Nicolás Léoz, Asunción
Referee: Enrique Osses (Chile)

March 21, 2012
22:00 UTC−03:00

Vasco da Gama (Brazil)	2–0	(Paraguay) Libertad
Juninho Pernambucano 52'; Alecsandro 61'	Report

Estádio São Januário, Rio de Janeiro
Referee: Wilmar Roldán (Colombia)
March 27, 2012
19:15 UTC−03:00

Nacional (Uruguay)	1–0	(Peru) Alianza Lima
Viudez 68'	Report

Estadio Centenario, Montevideo
Referee: Néstor Pitana (Argentina)

April 3, 2012
20:00 UTC−05:00

Alianza Lima (Peru)	1–2	(Brazil) Vasco da Gama
Curiel 76'	Report	Fellipe Bastos 17', 70'

Estadio Alejandro Villanueva, Lima
Referee: Saúl Laverni (Argentina)
April 5, 2012
20:15 UTC−03:00

Libertad (Paraguay)	2–1	(Uruguay) Nacional
Velázquez 65'; V. Cáceres 90'	Report	Viudez 9'

Estadio Dr. Nicolás Léoz, Asunción
Referee: Omar Ponce (Ecuador)

April 12, 2012
21:50 UTC−03:00

Nacional (Uruguay)	0–1	(Brazil) Vasco da Gama
	Report	Diego Souza 56'

Estadio Gran Parque Central, Montevideo
Referee: Pablo Lunati (Argentina)
April 12, 2012
19:50 UTC−05:00

Alianza Lima (Peru)	1–2	(Paraguay) Libertad
Hurtado 22'	Report	Camacho 53'; Núñez 74'

Estadio Alejandro Villanueva, Lima
Referee: Juan Soto (Venezuela)

=== Group 6 ===
Pos	Team	Pld	W	D	L	GF	GA	GD	Pts	COR	CAZ	NAC	TAC
1	(Brazil) Corinthians	6	4	2	0	13	2	+11	14		1–0	2–0	6–0
2	(Mexico) Cruz Azul	6	3	2	1	11	4	+7	11	0–0		4–1	4–0
3	(Paraguay) Nacional	6	1	1	4	6	13	−7	4	1–3	1–2		3–2
4	(Venezuela) Deportivo Táchira	6	0	3	3	4	15	−11	3	1–1	1–1	0–0	

Legend: Blue = home team win; Yellow = draw; Red = away team win.
February 8, 2012
18:45 UTC−03:00

Nacional (Paraguay)	1–2	(Mexico) Cruz Azul
Bogado 20'	Report	Orozco 5', 28'

Estadio Dr. Nicolás Léoz, Asunción
Referee: Néstor Pitana (Argentina)
February 15, 2012
19:30 UTC−04:30

Deportivo Táchira (Venezuela)	1–1	(Brazil) Corinthians
S. Herrera 21'	Report	Ralf 90+4'

Estadio Polideportivo de Pueblo Nuevo, San Cristóbal
Referee: Wilmar Roldán (Colombia)

February 21, 2012
20:45 UTC−06:00

Cruz Azul (Mexico)	4–0	(Venezuela) Deportivo Táchira
Cortés 18' (pen.); Perea 54'; Orozco 78'; Villa 81'	Report

Estadio Azul, Mexico City
Referee: Imer Machado (Colombia)
March 7, 2012
22:00 UTC−03:00

Corinthians (Brazil)	2–0	(Paraguay) Nacional
Danilo 38'; Jorge Henrique 67'	Report

Estádio Municipal Paulo Machado de Carvalho (Pacaembu), São Paulo
Referee: Enrique Osses (Chile)

March 13, 2012
19:45 UTC−03:00

Nacional (Paraguay)	3–2	(Venezuela) Deportivo Táchira
Cano 50' (pen.), 72'; Torales 81'	Report	P. Fernández 30'; Chourio 79'

Estadio Feliciano Cáceres, Luque
Referee: Alfredo Intriago (Ecuador)
March 14, 2012
19:00 UTC−06:00

Cruz Azul (Mexico)	0–0	(Brazil) Corinthians
	Report

Estadio Azul, Mexico City
Referee: Carlos Vera (Ecuador)

March 21, 2012
22:00 UTC−03:00

Corinthians (Brazil)	1–0	(Mexico) Cruz Azul
Danilo 35'	Report

Estádio Municipal Paulo Machado de Carvalho (Pacaembu), São Paulo
Referee: Martín Vázquez (Uruguay)
March 27, 2012
20:00 UTC−04:30

Deportivo Táchira (Venezuela)	0–0	(Paraguay) Nacional
	Report

Estadio Polideportivo de Pueblo Nuevo, San Cristóbal
Referee: Raúl Orosco (Bolivia)

April 3, 2012
20:30 UTC−04:30

Deportivo Táchira (Venezuela)	1–1	(Mexico) Cruz Azul
Parra 19'	Report	Giménez 83'

Estadio Polideportivo de Pueblo Nuevo, San Cristóbal
Referee: Darío Ubriaco (Uruguay)
April 11, 2012
21:00 UTC−04:00

Nacional (Paraguay)	1–3	(Brazil) Corinthians
Peralta 70'	Report	Jorge Henrique 28'; Emerson Sheik 51'; Élton 71'

Estadio Antonio Oddone Sarubbi, Ciudad del Este
Referee: Patricio Loustau (Argentina)

April 18, 2012
21:50 UTC−03:00

Corinthians (Brazil)	6–0	(Venezuela) Deportivo Táchira
Danilo 17'; Paulinho 26'; Jorge Henrique 62'; Emerson Sheik 70'; Liédson 72'; Douglas 83' (pen.)	Report

Estádio Municipal Paulo Machado de Carvalho (Pacaembu), São Paulo
Referee: Patricio Polic (Chile)
April 18, 2012
19:50 UTC−05:00

Cruz Azul (Mexico)	4–1	(Paraguay) Nacional
Orozco 20'; Maranhão 45'; Bravo 65'; Perea 80'	Report	Cristaldo 43'

Estadio Azul, Mexico City
Referee: Víctor Hugo Carrillo (Peru)

=== Group 7 ===
Pos	Team	Pld	W	D	L	GF	GA	GD	Pts	VEL	QUI	DEF	GDL
1	(Argentina) Vélez Sársfield	6	4	0	2	10	6	+4	12		1–0	1–3	3–0
2	(Ecuador) Deportivo Quito	6	3	1	2	11	4	+7	10	3–0		2–0	5–0
3	(Uruguay) Defensor Sporting	6	3	0	3	6	7	−1	9	0–3	2–0		1–0
4	(Mexico) Guadalajara	6	1	1	4	2	12	−10	4	0–2	1–1	1–0	

Legend: Blue = home team win; Yellow = draw; Red = away team win.
February 7, 2012
19:45 UTC−02:00

Defensor Sporting (Uruguay)	0–3	(Argentina) Vélez Sársfield
	Report	D. Ramírez 41'; Obolo 81'; Domínguez 85'

Estadio Luis Franzini, Montevideo
Referee: Enrique Osses (Chile)
February 7, 2012
20:15 UTC−06:00

Guadalajara (Mexico)	1–1	(Ecuador) Deportivo Quito
Arellano 90+2'	Report	Alustiza 7'

Estadio Omnilife, Zapopan
Referee: Juan Soto (Venezuela)

February 14, 2012
20:00 UTC−02:00

Defensor Sporting (Uruguay)	2–0	(Ecuador) Deportivo Quito
Alemán 22' (pen.); Callorda 78'	Report

Estadio Luis Franzini, Montevideo
Referee: Heber Lopes (Brazil)
February 22, 2012
22:00 UTC−03:00

Vélez Sársfield (Argentina)	3–0	(Mexico) Guadalajara
Obolo 67'; Insúa 81', 82'	Report

Estadio José Amalfitani, Buenos Aires
Referee: Leandro Vuaden (Brazil)

March 7, 2012
17:45 UTC−05:00

Deportivo Quito (Ecuador)	3–0	(Argentina) Vélez Sársfield
Alustiza 45+3' (pen.); F. Martínez 47'; Saritama 70'	Report

Estadio Olímpico Atahualpa, Quito
Referee: José Buitrago (Colombia)
March 13, 2012
21:15 UTC−06:00

Guadalajara (Mexico)	1–0	(Uruguay) Defensor Sporting
Fierro 10'	Report

Estadio Omnilife, Zapopan
Referee: Marlon Escalante (Venezuela)

March 22, 2012
19:45 UTC−03:00

Vélez Sársfield (Argentina)	1–0	(Ecuador) Deportivo Quito
J. Martínez 89'	Report

Estadio José Amalfitani, Buenos Aires
Referee: Wilson Seneme (Brazil)
March 28, 2012
19:45 UTC−03:00

Defensor Sporting (Uruguay)	1–0	(Mexico) Guadalajara
Olivera 70'	Report

Estadio Luis Franzini, Montevideo
Referee: Enrique Cáceres (Paraguay)

April 10, 2012
16:30 UTC−05:00

Deportivo Quito (Ecuador)	2–0	(Uruguay) Defensor Sporting
Checa 36'; Bevacqua 63'	Report

Estadio Olímpico Atahualpa, Quito
Referee: Víctor Hugo Carrillo (Peru)
April 11, 2012
17:45 UTC−05:00

Guadalajara (Mexico)	0–2	(Argentina) Vélez Sársfield
	Report	A. Fernández 69'; Pratto 89'

Estadio Omnilife, Zapopan
Referee: Henry Gambetta (Peru)

April 17, 2012
20:15 UTC−03:00

Vélez Sársfield (Argentina)	1–3	(Uruguay) Defensor Sporting
Insúa 63' (pen.)	Report	Olivera 6'; D. Rodríguez 37'; Britos 46'

Estadio José Amalfitani, Buenos Aires
Referee: Sandro Ricci (Brazil)
April 17, 2012
18:15 UTC−05:00

Deportivo Quito (Ecuador)	5–0	(Mexico) Guadalajara
Alustiza 17', 27', 70', 86'; F. Martínez 64'	Report

Estadio Olímpico Atahualpa, Quito
Referee: Wilmar Roldán (Colombia)

=== Group 8 ===
Pos	Team	Pld	W	D	L	GF	GA	GD	Pts	UCH	ATN	GOD	PEÑ
1	Universidad de Chile	6	4	1	1	11	6	+5	13		2–1	5–1	2–1
2	(Colombia) Atlético Nacional	6	3	2	1	16	8	+8	11	2–0		2–2	3–0
3	(Argentina) Godoy Cruz	6	1	2	3	10	16	−6	5	0–1	4–4		1–0
4	(Uruguay) Peñarol	6	1	1	4	6	13	−7	4	1–1	0–4	4–2	

Legend: Blue = home team win; Yellow = draw; Red = away team win.
February 14, 2012
21:30 UTC−05:00

Atlético Nacional (Colombia)	2–0	Universidad de Chile
Valencia 27'; Pabón 80'	Report

Estadio Atanasio Girardot, Medellín
Referee: Víctor Hugo Carrillo (Peru)
February 16, 2012
21:30 UTC−03:00

Godoy Cruz (Argentina)	1–0	(Uruguay) Peñarol
Villar 51'	Report

Estadio Malvinas Argentinas, Mendoza
Referee: Raúl Orosco (Bolivia)

February 21, 2012
20:15 UTC−02:00

Peñarol (Uruguay)	0–4	(Colombia) Atlético Nacional
	Report	Córdoba 8', 49'; Pabón 64', 77'

Estadio Centenario, Montevideo
Referee: Carlos Amarilla (Paraguay)
February 22, 2012
19:45 UTC−03:00

Universidad de Chile	5–1	(Argentina) Godoy Cruz
Fernándes 29', 45', 72'; Lorenzetti 34'; Henríquez 90'	Report	Sigali 53'

Estadio Santa Laura-Universidad SEK, Santiago
Referee: Wilson Seneme (Brazil)

March 6, 2012
20:30 UTC−02:00

Peñarol (Uruguay)	1–1	Universidad de Chile
Freitas 21'	Report	Fernándes 34'

Estadio Centenario, Montevideo
Referee: Omar Ponce (Ecuador)
March 8, 2012
21:45 UTC−03:00

Godoy Cruz (Argentina)	4–4	(Colombia) Atlético Nacional
Caruso 8', 68', 89'; R. Ramírez 33'	Report	Mosquera 13'; Sigali 29' (o.g.); Pabón 54', 69'

Estadio Malvinas Argentinas, Mendoza
Referee: Leandro Vuaden (Brazil)

March 22, 2012
20:00 UTC−05:00

Atlético Nacional (Colombia)	2–2	(Argentina) Godoy Cruz
Mosquera 2', 61' (pen.)	Report	Curbelo 23'; Castillón 34'

Estadio Atanasio Girardot, Medellín
Referee: Heber Lopes (Brazil)
March 27, 2012
21:30 UTC−03:00

Universidad de Chile	2–1	(Uruguay) Peñarol
M. Rodríguez 2', 90+1'	Report	Valdez 51'

Estadio Nacional Julio Martínez Prádanos, Santiago
Referee: Leandro Vuaden (Brazil)

April 4, 2012
19:30 UTC−03:00

Godoy Cruz (Argentina)	0–1	Universidad de Chile
	Report	Henríquez 45+2'

Estadio Malvinas Argentinas, Mendoza
Referee: Carlos Amarilla (Paraguay)
April 10, 2012
21:00 UTC−05:00

Atlético Nacional (Colombia)	3–0	(Uruguay) Peñarol
Murillo 7'; Pabón 44'; Álvarez 59'	Report

Estadio Atanasio Girardot, Medellín
Referee: Joaquín Artequera (Bolivia)

April 19, 2012
22:00 UTC−03:00

Universidad de Chile	2–1	(Colombia) Atlético Nacional
M. Rodríguez 10'; O. González 68'	Report	Pabón 62'

Estadio Nacional Julio Martínez Prádanos, Santiago
Referee: Víctor Rivera (Peru)
April 19, 2012
22:00 UTC−03:00

Peñarol (Uruguay)	4–2	(Argentina) Godoy Cruz
Zambrana 37', 73'; Mora 50'; Pérez 61'	Report	N. Sánchez 12'; Sevillano 19'

Estadio Centenario, Montevideo
Referee: Ricardo Marques (Brazil)
