= 2012 Copa Libertadores finals =

2012 Copa Libertadores de América finals
- Event: 2012 Copa Libertadores de América
Boca Juniors	Corinthians
(Argentina)	(Brazil)
1	3
- on points

First leg
Boca Juniors	Corinthians
1	1
- Date: June 27, 2012
- Venue: Estadio Alberto J. Armando (La Bombonera), Buenos Aires
- Man of the Match: Matías Caruzzo
- Referee: Enrique Osses (Chile)
- Attendance: 51,901

Second leg
Corinthians	Boca Juniors
2	0
- Date: July 4, 2012
- Venue: Estádio Municipal Paulo Machado de Carvalho (Pacaembu), São Paulo
- Man of the Match: Emerson Sheik
- Referee: Wilmar Roldán (Colombia)
- Attendance: 40,186

The 2012 Copa Libertadores de América finals were the final two-legged tie that decided the winner of the 2012 Copa Libertadores de América, the 53rd edition of the Copa Libertadores de América, South America's premier international club football tournament organized by CONMEBOL.

It was the fourth Libertadores decisive-match final to be held at the Pacaembu as well as the tenth final held in São Paulo and the seventeenth final held in Brazil. While Corinthians progressed to the knockout stages by finishing top of their group, Boca progressed by finishing runners-up of their group. Boca then beat Unión Española, Fluminense and Universidad de Chile to reach the finals, while Corinthians knocked out Emelec, Vasco da Gama and defending champions Santos.

In the first leg of the final on 27 June at the Estadio Alberto J. Armando (La Bombonera), Boca Juniors took the lead with a goal from Facundo Roncaglia after 73 minutes when he drove the ball high into the net. Corinthians equalised in the 85th minute when Romarinho lobbed the ball over fallen Boca Juniors goalkeeper Agustín Orión with the game finishing at 1–1.

In the second leg of the final on 4 July at the Estádio Municipal Paulo Machado de Carvalho (Pacaembu), Emerson Sheik scored two second half goals to give Corinthians a 2–0 win. As a result, Corinthians won their first Copa Libertadores, and finished the tournament undefeated. As winners, Corinthians represented CONMEBOL at the 2012 FIFA Club World Cup, in which they entered at the semifinal stage and made it to the final, where they defeated Chelsea 1–0. They also played against 2012 Copa Sudamericana winners São Paulo in the 2013 Recopa Sudamericana.

== Qualified teams ==
Team	Previous finals appearances (bold indicates winners)
(Argentina) Boca Juniors	1963, **1977**, **1978**, 1979, **2000**, **2001**, **2003**, 2004, **2007**
(Brazil) Corinthians	None

== Venues ==
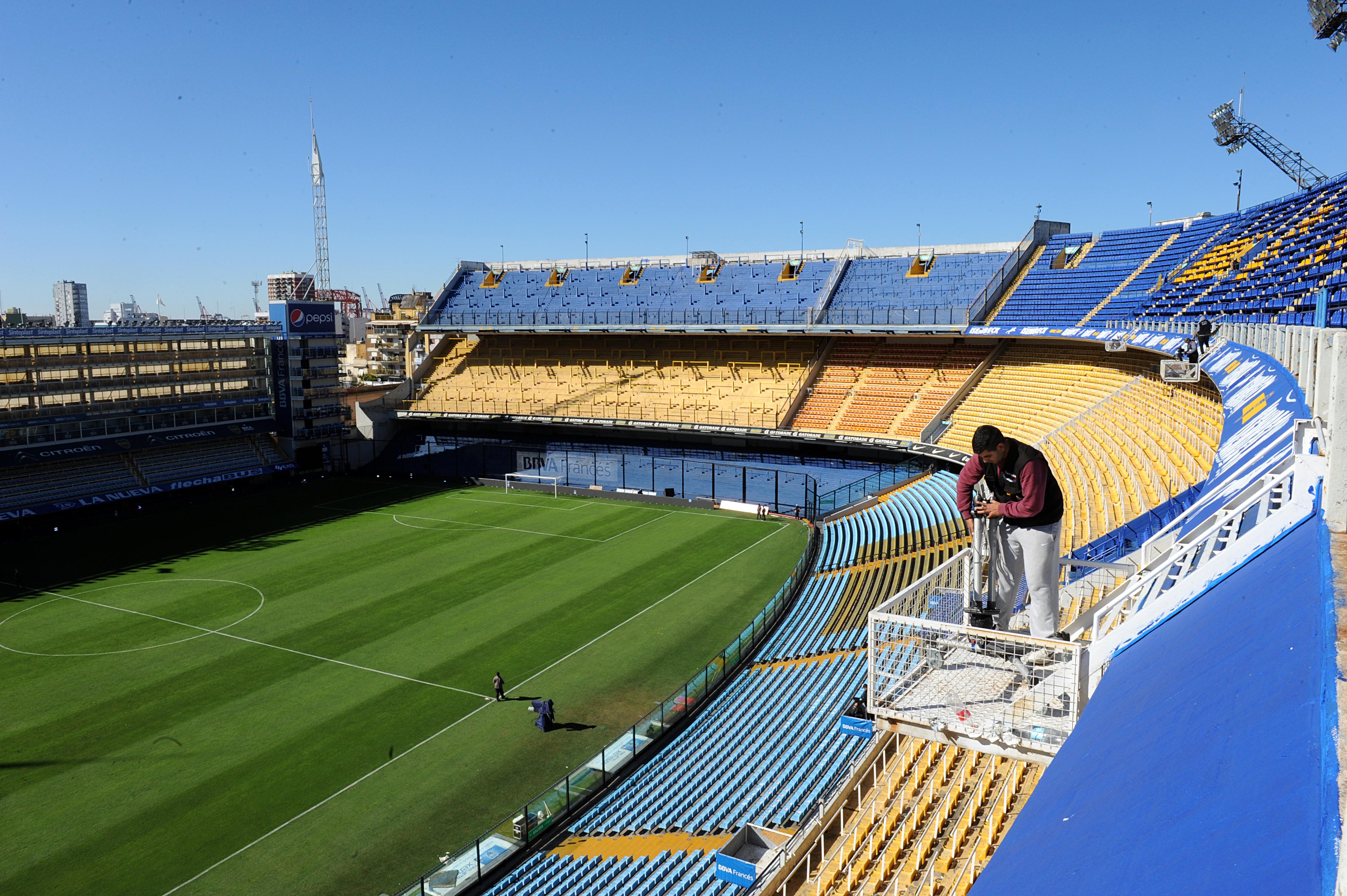
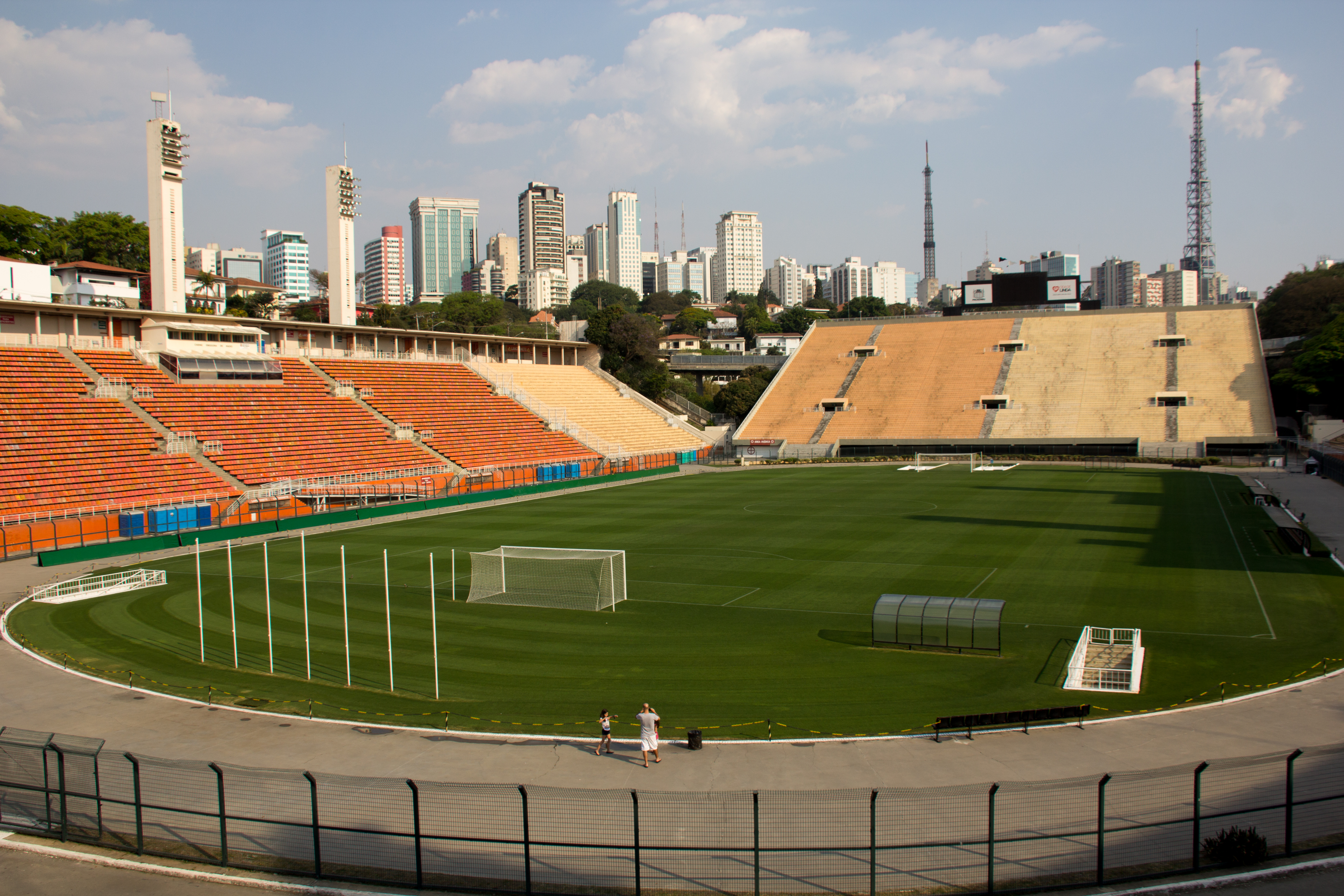
La Bombonera (left) and Estadio do Pacaembú, venues for the series

== Background ==
To reach the finals, in the knockout phase Boca defeated Unión Española, Fluminense, and Universidad de Chile (2–0 on aggregate score), while Corinthians overcame Emelec, Vasco da Gama, and the defending champions Santos (2–1 on aggregate).

Boca and Corinthians reached the final having already lost out in their domestic and state leagues respectively (the Torneo Clausura de la Primera División and Paulistão respectively). But Boca having also reached the final of their domestic cup competition (the Copa Argentina), that will play against Racing on August 8 (in other words, after these finals). Meanwhile, Corinthians (that, like the others Brazilians teams in this Libertadores, didn't play their domestic cup – Copa do Brasil – because of schedule conflicts) reached the final occupying 17th place of their domestic league (the Brasileirão).

In their most recent Libertadores finals, Boca won in 2007 to Grêmio 5–0 (3–0 in Buenos Aires, 2–0 in Porto Alegre). While Corinthians had never played a Libertadores/Copa de Campeones finals before, Boca have played in nine Libertadores/Copa de Campeones finals, winning six (1977, 1978, 2000, 2001, 2003 and 2007) and losing three (1963, 1979 and 2004). The two clubs have met each other twice in Americas before, with Boca winning 4–2 on aggregate in the round of 16 of the 1991 Copa Libertadores, and in the group stage of the 2000 Copa Mercosur, with Boca victory 3–0 in Buenos Aires, and a 2–2 draw in São Paulo (as Boca progressed in the competition – would be later eliminated by Atlético Mineiro in quarter-finals -, Corinthians was eliminated in this stage).

== Road to finals ==
(Argentina) Boca Juniors			Round	(Brazil) Corinthians		
Opponent	Venue	Score		Opponent	Venue	Score
Bye			First stage	Bye		
(Venezuela) Zamora	Away	0–0	Second stage	(Venezuela) Deportivo Táchira	Away	1–1
(Brazil) Fluminense	Home	1–2	Second stage	(Paraguay) Nacional	Home	2–0
(Argentina) Arsenal	Away	1–2	Second stage	(Mexico) Cruz Azul	Away	0–0
(Argentina) Arsenal	Home	2–0	Second stage	(Mexico) Cruz Azul	Home	1–0
(Brazil) Fluminense	Away	0–2	Second stage	(Paraguay) Nacional	Away	1–3
(Venezuela) Zamora	Home	2–0	Second stage	(Venezuela) Deportivo Táchira	Home	6–0
**Group 4 runner-up**: Team / Pld / W / D / L / GF / GA / GD / Pts; (Brazil) Fluminense / 6 / 5 / 0 / 1 / 7 / 4 / +3 / **15**; (Argentina) **Boca Juniors** / 6 / 4 / 1 / 1 / 9 / 3 / +6 / **13**; (Argentina) Arsenal / 6 / 2 / 0 / 4 / 6 / 7 / −1 / **6**; (Venezuela) Zamora / 6 / 0 / 1 / 5 / 0 / 8 / −8 / **1**			Second stage	**Group 6 winner**: Team / Pld / W / D / L / GF / GA / GD / Pts; (Brazil) **Corinthians** / 6 / 4 / 2 / 0 / 13 / 2 / +11 / **14**; (Mexico) Cruz Azul / 6 / 3 / 2 / 1 / 11 / 4 / +7 / **11**; (Paraguay) Nacional / 6 / 1 / 1 / 4 / 6 / 13 / −7 / **4**; (Venezuela) Deportivo Táchira / 6 / 0 / 3 / 3 / 4 / 15 / −11 / **3**		
(Chile) Unión Española	Home	2–1	Round of 16	(Ecuador) Emelec	Away	0–0
(Chile) Unión Española	Away	2–3	Round of 16	(Ecuador) Emelec	Home	3–0
(Brazil) Fluminense	Home	1–0	Quarterfinals	(Brazil) Vasco da Gama	Away	0–0
(Brazil) Fluminense	Away	1–1	Quarterfinals	(Brazil) Vasco da Gama	Home	1–0
Universidad de Chile	Home	2–0	Semifinals	(Brazil) Santos	Away	0–1
Universidad de Chile	Away	0–0	Semifinals	(Brazil) Santos	Home	1–1

== Rules ==
The final is played over two legs; home and away. The higher seeded team plays the second leg at home. The team that accumulates the most points —three for a win, one for a draw, zero for a loss— after the two legs is crowned the champion. Should the two teams be tied on points after the second leg, the team with the best goal difference wins. If the two teams have equal goal difference, the away goals rule is not applied, unlike the rest of the tournament. Extra time is played, which consists of two 15-minute halves. If the tie is still not broken, a penalty shootout ensues according to the Laws of the Game.

== Matches ==
=== First leg ===
June 27, 2012
21:50 UTC−3
First leg

Boca Juniors (Argentina)	1–1	(Brazil) Corinthians
Roncaglia 72'	Report	Romarinho 84'

Estadio Alberto J. Armando (La Bombonera), Buenos Aires
Attendance: 51,901
Referee: Enrique Osses (Chile)

**Boca Juniors**	**Corinthians**

GK	1	(Argentina) Agustín Orión
RB	23	(Argentina) Facundo Roncaglia	(yellow card) 19'
CB	2	(Argentina) Rolando Schiavi
CB	6	(Argentina) Matías Caruzzo
LB	3	(Argentina) Clemente Rodríguez
DM	18	(Argentina) Leandro Somoza
CM	16	(Argentina) Pablo Ledesma		(substituted off) 82'
CM	11	(Argentina) Walter Erviti	(yellow card) 88'
AM	10	(Argentina) Juan Román Riquelme (c)	(yellow card) 42'
CF	19	(Uruguay) Santiago Silva		(substituted off) 85'
CF	7	(Argentina) Pablo Mouche		(substituted off) 87'
Substitutes:
GK	13	(Uruguay) Sebastián Sosa
DF	5	(Argentina) Juan Sánchez Miño
DF	14	(Argentina) Gastón Sauro
MF	8	(Argentina) Diego Rivero		(substituted on) 82'
MF	21	(Argentina) Cristian Chávez
FW	20	(Argentina) Darío Cvitanich		(substituted on) 87'
FW	24	(Argentina) Lucas Viatri		(substituted on) 85'
Manager:
(Argentina) Julio César Falcioni

GK	24	(Brazil) Cássio
RB	2	(Brazil) Alessandro
CB	3	(Brazil) Chicão	(yellow card) 74'
CB	4	(Brazil) Leandro Castán
LB	6	(Brazil) Fábio Santos	(yellow card) 87'
CM	8	(Brazil) Paulinho
CM	5	(Brazil) Ralf
RW	23	(Brazil) Jorge Henrique		(substituted off) 39'
AM	12	(Brazil) Alex		(substituted off) 90+2'
LW	11	(Qatar) Emerson Sheik
CF	20	(Brazil) Danilo (c)		(substituted off) 83'
Substitutes:
GK	1	(Brazil) Júlio César
DF	10	(Brazil) Marquinhos
DF	18	(Brazil) Weldinho
DF	25	(Brazil) Wallace		(substituted on) 90+2'
MF	15	(Brazil) Douglas
FW	9	(Portugal) Liédson		(substituted on) 39'
FW	21	(Brazil) Romarinho		(substituted on) 83'
Manager:
(Brazil) Tite

Man of the Match:
(Argentina) Matías Caruzzo

Assistant referees:
Francisco Mondria (Chile)
Carlos Astroza (Chile)
Fourth official:
Patricio Polic (Chile)

=== Second leg ===
July 4, 2012
21:50 UTC−3
Second leg

Corinthians (Brazil)	2–0	(Argentina) Boca Juniors
Emerson 53', 72'	Report

Estádio Municipal Paulo Machado de Carvalho (Pacaembu), São Paulo
Attendance: 40,186
Referee: Wilmar Roldán (Colombia)

**Corinthians**	**Boca Juniors**

GK	24	(Brazil) Cássio
RB	2	(Brazil) Alessandro (c)
CB	3	(Brazil) Chicão	(yellow card) 4'
CB	4	(Brazil) Leandro Castán	(yellow card) 70'
LB	6	(Brazil) Fábio Santos
CM	8	(Brazil) Paulinho
CM	5	(Brazil) Ralf
RW	23	(Brazil) Jorge Henrique
AM	12	(Brazil) Alex		(substituted off) 88'
LW	11	(Qatar) Emerson Sheik		(substituted off) 90+1'
CF	20	(Brazil) Danilo
Substitutes:
GK	1	(Brazil) Júlio César
DF	10	(Brazil) Marquinhos
DF	16	(Brazil) Ramon
DF	25	(Brazil) Wallace		(substituted on) 90+1'
MF	15	(Brazil) Douglas		(substituted on) 88'
FW	9	(Portugal) Liédson
FW	21	(Brazil) Romarinho
Manager:
(Brazil) Tite

GK	1	(Argentina) Agustín Orión		(substituted off) 32'
RB	4	(Argentina) Franco Sosa
CB	2	(Argentina) Rolando Schiavi	(yellow card) 51'
CB	6	(Argentina) Matías Caruzzo	(yellow card) 54'
LB	3	(Argentina) Clemente Rodríguez
DM	18	(Argentina) Leandro Somoza
CM	16	(Argentina) Pablo Ledesma		(substituted off) 65'
CM	11	(Argentina) Walter Erviti
AM	10	(Argentina) Juan Román Riquelme (c)
CF	19	(Uruguay) Santiago Silva	(yellow card) 44'
CF	7	(Argentina) Pablo Mouche	(yellow card) 4'	(substituted off) 81'
Substitutes:
GK	13	(Uruguay) Sebastián Sosa		(substituted on) 32'
DF	5	(Argentina) Juan Sánchez Miño
DF	14	(Argentina) Gastón Sauro
MF	8	(Argentina) Diego Rivero
MF	21	(Argentina) Cristian Chávez
FW	20	(Argentina) Darío Cvitanich		(substituted on) 65'
FW	24	(Argentina) Lucas Viatri		(substituted on) 81'
Manager:
(Argentina) Julio César Falcioni

Man of the Match:
(Qatar) Emerson Sheik

Assistant referees:
Abraham González (Colombia)
Humberto Clavijo (Colombia)
Fourth official:
José Buitrago (Colombia)

Copa Libertadores de América
2012 Champion

**Corinthians**
**First Title**

== See also ==
- 2012 Copa Libertadores Femenina final
- 2012 Copa Sudamericana finals
