= 2012 Copa Libertadores knockout stage =

The knockout stages of the 2012 Copa Santander Libertadores de América consisted of four stages:

- Round of 16 (first legs: April 25, May 1–3; second legs: May 8–10)
- Quarterfinals (first legs: May 16–17; second legs: May 23–24)
- Semifinals (first legs: June 13–14; second legs: June 20–21)
- Finals (first leg: June 27; second leg: July 4)

== Format ==
The group winners and runners-up of the second stage qualified for the knockout stages. The sixteen teams played a single-elimination tournament. In each stage, teams played in two-legged ties on a home-away basis, with the higher-seeded team playing the second leg at home. Each team earned 3 points for a win, 1 point for a draw, and 0 points for a loss. The following criteria were used for breaking ties on points, except for the final:

1. Goal difference
2. Away goals
3. Penalty shootout (no extra time is played)

For the final, the first tiebreaker was goal difference. If tied on goal difference, the away goals rule would not be applied, and 30 minutes of extra time would be played. If still tied after extra time, the title would be decided by penalty shootout.

If two teams from the same association reached the semifinals, they would be forced to play each other.

== Qualified teams ==
Group	Winners	Runners-up
1	(Brazil) Santos	(Brazil) Internacional
2	(Argentina) Lanús	(Ecuador) Emelec
3	(Chile) Unión Española	(Bolivia) Bolívar
4	(Brazil) Fluminense	(Argentina) Boca Juniors
5	(Paraguay) Libertad	(Brazil) Vasco da Gama
6	(Brazil) Corinthians	(Mexico) Cruz Azul
7	(Argentina) Vélez Sársfield	(Ecuador) Deportivo Quito
8	Universidad de Chile	(Colombia) Atlético Nacional

== Seeding ==
The 16 qualified teams are seeded in the knockout stages according to their results in the second stage, with the group winners seeded 1–8, and the group runners-up seeded 9–16. The teams were ranked by:

1. Higher position in the group
2. Higher number of points (Pts)
3. Better goal difference (GD)
4. More goals scored (GS)
5. More away goals scored (AG)
6. Drawing of lots.

Teams qualified as group winners
Seed	Team	Pts	GD	GF	AG
1	(Brazil) Fluminense	15	+3	7	5
2	(Brazil) Corinthians	14	+11	13	4
3	(Brazil) Santos	13	+7	12	5
4	Universidad de Chile	13	+5	11	2
5	(Paraguay) Libertad	13	+4	11	4
6	(Argentina) Vélez Sársfield	12	+4	10	5
7	(Argentina) Lanús	10	+5	11	3
8	(Chile) Unión Española	10	+3	10	5

Teams qualified as group runners-up
Seed	Team	Pts	GD	GF	AG
9	(Argentina) Boca Juniors	13	+6	9	4
10	(Brazil) Vasco da Gama	13	+4	10	4
11	(Colombia) Atlético Nacional	11	+8	16	9
12	(Mexico) Cruz Azul	11	+7	11	3
13	(Ecuador) Deportivo Quito	10	+7	11	1
14	(Bolivia) Bolívar	10	+2	9	3
15	(Ecuador) Emelec	9	−1	7	3
16	(Brazil) Internacional	8	+4	10	2

== Bracket ==
In each tie, the higher-seeded team played the second leg at home.

Round of 16
1	(Brazil) Fluminense	0	2
16	(Brazil) Internacional	0	1
8	(Chile) Unión Española	1	2
9	(Argentina) Boca Juniors	2	3
4	U. de Chile	1	6
13	(Ecuador) Deportivo Quito	4	0
5	(Paraguay) Libertad	1	2
12	(Mexico) Cruz Azul	1	0
2	(Brazil) Corinthians	0	3
15	(Ecuador) Emelec	0	0
7	(Argentina) Lanús	1	2 (4)
10	(Brazil) Vasco da Gama (p)	2	1 (5)
3	(Brazil) Santos	1	8
14	(Bolivia) Bolívar	2	0
6	(Argentina) Vélez Sársfield	1	1
11	(Colombia) Atlético Nacional	0	1

Quarterfinals
1	(Brazil) Fluminense	0	1
9	(Argentina) Boca Juniors	1	1
4	U. de Chile (p)	1	1 (5)
5	(Paraguay) Libertad	1	1 (3)
2	(Brazil) Corinthians	0	1
10	(Brazil) Vasco da Gama	0	0
3	(Brazil) Santos (p)	0	1 (4)
6	(Argentina) Vélez Sársfield	1	0 (2)

Semifinals
9	(Argentina) Boca Juniors	2	0
4	U. de Chile	0	0
2	(Brazil) Corinthians	1	1
3	(Brazil) Santos	0	1

Finals
9	(Argentina) Boca Juniors	1	0
2	(Brazil) Corinthians	1	2

== Round of 16 ==
Team 1 played the second leg at home.

Teams			Scores		Tie-breakers		
Team 1	Points	Team 2	1st leg	2nd leg	GD	AG	Pen.
Fluminense (Brazil)	4:1	(Brazil) Internacional	0–0	2–1	—	—	—
Corinthians (Brazil)	4:1	(Ecuador) Emelec	0–0	3–0	—	—	—
Santos (Brazil)	3:3	(Bolivia) Bolívar	1–2	8–0	+7:−7	—	—
Universidad de Chile	3:3	(Ecuador) Deportivo Quito	1–4	6–0	+3:−3	—	—
Libertad (Paraguay)	4:1	(Mexico) Cruz Azul	1–1	2–0	—	—	—
Vélez Sársfield (Argentina)	4:1	(Colombia) Atlético Nacional	1–0	1–1	—	—	—
Lanús (Argentina)	3:3	(Brazil) Vasco da Gama	1–2	2–1	0:0	1:1	4–5
Unión Española (Chile)	0:6	(Argentina) Boca Juniors	1–2	2–3	—	—	—

=== Match A ===
April 25, 2012
21:50 UTC−03:00

Internacional (Brazil)	0–0	(Brazil) Fluminense
	Report

Estádio José Pinheiro Borda (Beira-Rio), Porto Alegre
Attendance: 32.268
Referee: Paulo Oliveira (Brazil)

May 10, 2012
22:00 UTC−03:00

Fluminense (Brazil)	2–1	(Brazil) Internacional
Leandro Euzebio 15'; Fred 45'	Report	Leandro Damião 13'

Estádio Olímpico João Havelange (Engenhão), Rio de Janeiro
Attendance: 33.386
Referee: Wilson Seneme (Brazil)

Fluminense won on points 4–1.

=== Match B ===
May 2, 2012
19:50 UTC−05:00

Emelec (Ecuador)	0–0	(Brazil) Corinthians
	Report

Estadio George Capwell, Guayaquil
Referee: José Buitrago (Colombia)

May 9, 2012
22:00 UTC−03:00

Corinthians (Brazil)	3–0	(Ecuador) Emelec
Fábio Santos 7'; Paulinho 64'; Alex 85'	Report

Estádio Municipal Paulo Machado de Carvalho (Pacaembu), São Paulo
Attendance: 34.329
Referee: Darío Ubriaco (Uruguay)

Corinthians won on points 4–1.

=== Match C ===
April 25, 2012
20:50 UTC−04:00

Bolívar (Bolivia)	2–1	(Brazil) Santos
Rafael 1' (o.g.); Campos 74'	Report	Maranhão 34'

Estadio Hernando Siles, La Paz
Referee: Enrique Osses (Chile)

May 10, 2012
19:30 UTC−03:00

Santos (Brazil)	8–0	(Bolivia) Bolívar
Elano 6', 49'; Neymar 21' (pen.), 36'; Ganso 27', 52'; Alan Kardec 29'; Borges 60'	Report

Estádio Urbano Caldeira (Vila Belmiro), Santos
Referee: Martín Vázquez (Uruguay)

Tied on points 3–3, Santos won on goal difference.

=== Match D ===
May 3, 2012
19:15 UTC−05:00

Deportivo Quito (Ecuador)	4–1	Universidad de Chile
Alustiza 30', 56'; Checa 45'; Martínez 82'	Report	Rodríguez 36'

Estadio Olímpico Atahualpa, Quito
Referee: Francisco Chacón (Mexico)

May 10, 2012
21:00 UTC−04:00

Universidad de Chile	6–0	(Ecuador) Deportivo Quito
Fernándes 20', 27'; Díaz 35'; Mena 56'; Henríquez 70', 73'	Report

Estadio Nacional Julio Martínez Prádanos, Santiago
Referee: Néstor Pitana (Argentina)

Tied on points 3–3, Universidad de Chile won on goal difference.

=== Match E ===
May 1, 2012
21:30 UTC−05:00

Cruz Azul (Mexico)	1–1	(Paraguay) Libertad
Orozco 26'	Report	Velázquez 70'

Estadio Azul, Mexico City
Referee: Sergio Pezzotta (Argentina)

May 8, 2012
21:30 UTC−04:00

Libertad (Paraguay)	2–0	(Mexico) Cruz Azul
Núñez 9'; Cáceres 49'	Report

Estadio Dr. Nicolás Léoz, Asunción
Referee: Leandro Vuaden (Brazil)

Libertad won on points 4–1.

=== Match F ===
May 1, 2012
19:15 UTC−05:00

Atlético Nacional (Colombia)	0–1	(Argentina) Vélez Sársfield
	Report	Bella 8'

Estadio Atanasio Girardot, Medellín
Referee: Darío Ubriaco (Uruguay)

May 8, 2012
20:00 UTC−03:00

Vélez Sársfield (Argentina)	1–1	(Colombia) Atlético Nacional
Fernández 52'	Report	Mosquera 69'

José Amalfitani Stadium, Buenos Aires
Referee: Julio Quintana (Paraguay)

Vélez Sársfield won on points 4–1.

=== Match G ===
May 2, 2012
21:50 UTC−03:00

Vasco da Gama (Brazil)	2–1	(Argentina) Lanús
Alecsandro 25'; Diego Souza 42'	Report	Regueiro 62'

Estádio São Januário, Rio de Janeiro
Referee: Roberto Silvera (Uruguay)

May 9, 2012
22:00 UTC−03:00

Lanús (Argentina)	2–1	(Brazil) Vasco da Gama
Pavone 60'; Gutiérrez 78'	Report	Nilton 18'
Penalties
Regueiro (penalty scored); Romero (penalty missed); Velázquez (penalty scored); Camoranesi (penalty scored); Fritzler (penalty scored)	4–5	(penalty scored) Felipe; (penalty scored) Juninho Pernambucano; (penalty scored) Carlos Alberto; (penalty scored) Renato Silva; (penalty scored) Alecsandro

Estadio Ciudad de Lanús, Lanús
Referee: Carlos Amarilla (Paraguay)

Tied on points 3–3, Vasco da Gama won on penalties.

=== Match H ===
May 2, 2012
19:30 UTC−03:00

Boca Juniors (Argentina)	2–1	(Chile) Unión Española
Riquelme 24'; Silva 89'	Report	Jaime 72'

Estadio Alberto J. Armando (La Bombonera), Buenos Aires
Referee: Víctor Hugo Carrillo (Peru)

May 9, 2012
18:30 UTC−04:00

Unión Española (Chile)	2–3	(Argentina) Boca Juniors
Pineda 61'; Jaime 70'	Report	Insaurralde 25'; Mouche 49'; Riquelme 67'

Estadio Santa Laura-Universidad SEK, Santiago
Referee: Wilmar Roldán (Colombia)

Boca Juniors won on points 6–0.

== Quarterfinals ==
Team 1 played the second leg at home.

Teams			Scores		Tie-breakers		
Team 1	Points	Team 2	1st leg	2nd leg	GD	AG	Pen.
Fluminense (Brazil)	1:4	(Argentina) Boca Juniors	0–1	1–1	—	—	—
Corinthians (Brazil)	4:1	(Brazil) Vasco da Gama	0–0	1–0	—	—	—
Santos (Brazil)	3:3	(Argentina) Vélez Sársfield	0–1	1–0	0:0	0:0	4–2
Universidad de Chile	2:2	(Paraguay) Libertad	1–1	1–1	0:0	1:1	5–3

=== Match S1 ===
May 17, 2012
19:45 UTC−03:00

Boca Juniors (Argentina)	1–0	(Brazil) Fluminense
Mouche 51'	Report

Estadio Alberto J. Armando (La Bombonera), Buenos Aires
Attendance: 45.000
Referee: José Buitrago (Colombia)

May 23, 2012
19:30 UTC−03:00

Fluminense (Brazil)	1–1	(Argentina) Boca Juniors
Thiago Carleto 16'	Report	Silva 90'

Estádio Olímpico João Havelange (Engenhão), Rio de Janeiro
Attendance: 36.276
Referee: Enrique Osses (Chile)

Boca Juniors won on points 4–1.

=== Match S2 ===
May 16, 2012
21:50 UTC−03:00

Vasco da Gama (Brazil)	0–0	(Brazil) Corinthians
	Report

Estádio São Januário, Rio de Janeiro
Referee: Sandro Ricci (Brazil)

May 23, 2012
22:00 UTC−03:00

Corinthians (Brazil)	1–0	(Brazil) Vasco da Gama
Paulinho 87'	Report

Estádio Municipal Paulo Machado de Carvalho (Pacaembu), São Paulo
Attendance: 35.974
Referee: Leandro Vuaden (Brazil)

Corinthians won on points 4–1.

=== Match S3 ===
May 17, 2012
22:00 UTC−03:00

Vélez Sársfield (Argentina)	1–0	(Brazil) Santos
Obolo 35'	Report

José Amalfitani Stadium, Buenos Aires
Referee: Carlos Amarilla (Paraguay)

May 24, 2012
20:00 UTC−03:00

Santos (Brazil)	1–0	(Argentina) Vélez Sársfield
Alan Kardec 77'	Report
Penalties
Alan Kardec (penalty scored); Ganso (penalty scored); Elano (penalty scored); Léo (penalty scored)	4–2	(penalty scored) J. Martínez; (penalty missed) Canteros; (penalty missed) Papa; (penalty scored) Domínguez

Estádio Urbano Caldeira (Vila Belmiro), Santos
Referee: Roberto Silvera (Uruguay)

Tied on points 3–3, Santos won on penalties.

=== Match S4 ===
May 16, 2012
18:30 UTC−04:00

Libertad (Paraguay)	1–1	Universidad de Chile
Cáceres 7'	Report	Lorenzetti 55'

Estadio Dr. Nicolás Léoz, Asunción
Referee: Darío Ubriaco (Uruguay)

May 24, 2012
21:30 UTC−04:00

Universidad de Chile	1–1	(Paraguay) Libertad
Díaz 17'	Report	González 22' (o.g.)
Penalties
Aránguiz (penalty scored); Díaz (penalty scored); Ruidíaz (penalty scored); Rodríguez (penalty scored); Lorenzetti (penalty scored)	5–3	(penalty scored) Velázquez; (penalty scored) Cáceres; (penalty missed) Ayala; (penalty scored) Muñoz

Estadio Nacional Julio Martínez Prádanos, Santiago
Referee: Wilmar Roldán (Colombia)

Tied on points 2–2, Universidad de Chile won on penalties.

== Semifinals ==
Team 1 played the second leg at home.

Teams			Scores		Tie-breakers		
Team 1	Points	Team 2	1st leg	2nd leg	GD	AG	Pen.
Universidad de Chile	1:4	(Argentina) Boca Juniors	0–2	0–0	—	—	—
Corinthians (Brazil)	4:1	(Brazil) Santos	1–0	1–1	—	—	—

=== Match F1 ===
June 14, 2012
21:15 UTC−03:00

Boca Juniors (Argentina)	2–0	Universidad de Chile
Silva 15'; Sánchez Miño 55'	Report

Estadio Alberto J. Armando (La Bombonera), Buenos Aires
Attendance: 51.000
Referee: Wilmar Roldán (Colombia)

June 21, 2012
20:15 UTC−04:00

Universidad de Chile	0–0	(Argentina) Boca Juniors
	Report

Estadio Nacional Julio Martínez Prádanos, Santiago
Referee: Darío Ubriaco (Uruguay)

Boca Juniors won on points 4–1.

=== Match F2 ===
June 13, 2012
21:50 UTC−03:00

Santos (Brazil)	0–1	(Brazil) Corinthians
	Report	Emerson Sheik 28'

Estádio Urbano Caldeira (Vila Belmiro), Santos
Referee: Marcelo de Lima Henrique (Brazil)

June 20, 2012
21:50 UTC−03:00

Corinthians (Brazil)	1–1	(Brazil) Santos
Danilo 47'	Report	Neymar 39'

Estádio Municipal Paulo Machado de Carvalho (Pacaembu), São Paulo
Attendance: 37,978
Referee: Leandro Vuaden (Brazil)

Corinthians won on points 4–1.

== Finals ==
The Finals were played over two legs, with the higher-seeded team playing the second leg at home. If the teams were tied on points and goal difference at the end of regulation in the second leg, the away goals rule would not be applied and 30 minutes of extra time would be played. If still tied after extra time, the title would be decided by penalty shootout.

June 27, 2012
21:50 UTC−03:00

Boca Juniors (Argentina)	1–1	(Brazil) Corinthians
Roncaglia 72'	Report	Romarinho 84'

Estadio Alberto J. Armando (La Bombonera), Buenos Aires
Referee: Enrique Osses (Chile)

July 4, 2012
21:50 UTC−03:00

Corinthians (Brazil)	2–0	(Argentina) Boca Juniors
Emerson Sheik 53', 72'	Report

Estádio Municipal Paulo Machado de Carvalho (Pacaembu), São Paulo
Referee: Wilmar Roldán (Colombia)

Corinthians won on points 4–1.
