= 2012 in Chilean football =

Football in Chile
- Season: 2012

This article covers the 2012 football season in Chile.

== National tournaments ==
=== Primera División ===
- Apertura Champion: Club Universidad de Chile
  - Topscorer: Emanuel Herrera
- Clausura Champion: Huachipato
  - Topscorer: Sebastián Sáez
- Relegated: Unión San Felipe, Deportes La Serena and Universidad de Concepción

=== Copa Chile ===
- Champion: Club Universidad de Chile

== National team results ==
The Chile national football team results and fixtures for 2012.

Win Draw Loss

=== 2014 World Cup qualifiers ===
June 2 Round 5	Bolivia	0–2	Chile	Estadio Hernando Siles, La Paz
16:10 UTC−4		Report	Aránguiz 45+3'; Vidal 83'	Attendance: 34,389; Referee: Alfredo Intriago (Ecuador)

June 9 Round 6	Venezuela	0–2	Chile	Puerto La Cruz, Venezuela
06:30 UTC−4		Report	Fernández 85'; Aránguiz 90+2'	Stadium: Estadio Anzoátegui; Attendance: 35,000; Referee: José Buitrago (Colombia)

September 10 Round 8	Chile	1–3	Colombia	Santiago, Chile
19:15 UTC-3	Fernández 41'	Report	Rodríguez 58'; Falcao 73'; Gutiérrez 76'	Stadium: Estadio Monumental David Arellano, Santiago; Attendance: 38,000; Referee: Víctor Hugo Carrillo (Perú)

October 12 Round 9	Ecuador	3–1	Chile	Quito, Ecuador
16:00 UTC–5	Caicedo 33', 56'; Castillo 90+3'	Report	Paredes 25' (o.g.)	Stadium: Estadio Olímpico Atahualpa; Referee: Héber Lopes (Brazil)

October 16 Round 10	Chile	1–2	Argentina	Santiago, Chile
21:05 UTC–3	Gutiérrez 90+2'	Report	Messi 28'; Higuaín 31'	Stadium: Estadio Nacional, Santiago; Attendance: 50,000; Referee: Antonio Arias (Paraguay)

==== Friendly matches ====
February 15 Friendly	Paraguay	2–0	Chile	Luque, Paraguay
	E. Benítez 45+1' (pen.); J. Ortigoza 72'			Stadium: Estadio Feliciano Cáceres; Attendance: 10,000

February 29 Friendly	Chile	1–1	Ghana	Chester, Pennsylvania, United States
19:15 UTC-5	M. Fernández 74'	Report	Mpong 42'	Stadium: PPL Park; Attendance: 6.000

March 21 Friendly	Chile	3–1	Peru	Arica, Chile
22:10 UTC-3	Paredes 5'; Andía 43'; Mena 87'	Report	Galliquio 21'	Stadium: Estadio Carlos Dittborn; Attendance: 12,000

April 11 Friendly	Peru	0–3	Chile	Tacna, Peru
20:00 UTC-5		Report	Mena 46'; Flores 64'; Carrasco 72'	Stadium: Estadio Jorge Basadre; Attendance: 15,000

August 15 Friendly	Ecuador	3–0	Chile	Flushing, Queens, United States
	Mina 10'; Ayoví 14'; Montero 68'			Stadium: Citi Field

November 14 Friendly	Serbia	3–1	Chile	St. Gallen, Switzerland
	Marković 23'; Đorđević 48'; Đuričić 60'		Henríquez 89'	Stadium: AFG Arena; Attendance: 3,000; Referee: A. Bieri

== Record ==
Competition	GP	W	D	L	GF	GA
International Friendly	6	2	1	3	8	10
2014 FIFA World Cup qualification	5	2	0	3	7	8
Total	11	4	1	6	15	18

== Goal scorers ==
Player	Goals
Charles Aránguiz	2
Matías Fernández	2
Eugenio Mena	2
Arturo Vidal	1
Esteban Paredes	1
Felipe Flores	1
Bryan Carrasco	1
Enzo Andía	1
Felipe Gutiérrez	1
Ángelo Henríquez	1
Own goal	1
