= 2012 Copa Libertadores =

53rd season of Copa Libertadores

2012 Copa Libertadores de América
2012 Copa Libertadores da América

Tournament details
- Dates: January 24 – July 4, 2012
- Teams: 38 (from 11 associations)

Final positions
- Champions: (Brazil) Corinthians (1st title)
- Runners-up: (Argentina) Boca Juniors

Tournament statistics
- Matches played: 138
- Goals scored: 364 (2.64 per match)
- Top scorer(s): (Argentina) Matías Alustiza (Brazil) Neymar (8 goals each)
- Best player: (Qatar) Emerson

The 2012 Copa Libertadores de América (officially the 2012 Copa Santander Libertadores for sponsorship reasons) was the 53rd edition of the Copa Libertadores de América, South America's premier international club football tournament organized by CONMEBOL. It ran from January 24 to July 4, 2012. Santos were the defending champions, but lost to Corinthians in the semifinals.

São Paulo-based club Corinthians won the competition, with an undefeated campaign, after defeating six-time champion Boca Juniors in the finals. It is Corinthians' first Libertadores title. By winning the competition, Corinthians won the right to play in the 2012 FIFA Club World Cup and the 2013 Recopa Sudamericana.

== Qualified teams ==
Association	Team (Berth)	Entry stage	Qualification method
(Argentina) Argentina; 5 berths	Vélez Sársfield (Argentina 1)	Second Stage	2011 Clausura champion
(Argentina) Argentina; 5 berths	Boca Juniors (Argentina 2)	Second Stage	2011 Apertura champion
(Argentina) Argentina; 5 berths	Lanús (Argentina 3)	Second Stage	2011 tournaments aggregate table best non-champion
(Argentina) Argentina; 5 berths	Godoy Cruz (Argentina 4)	Second Stage	2011 tournaments aggregate table 2nd best non-champion
(Argentina) Argentina; 5 berths	Arsenal (Argentina 5)	First Stage	2011 Copa Sudamericana best performing team not yet qualified
(Bolivia) Bolivia; 3 berths	Bolívar (Bolivia 1)	Second Stage	2011 Adecuación champion
(Bolivia) Bolivia; 3 berths	The Strongest (Bolivia 2)	Second Stage	2011 Apertura champion
(Bolivia) Bolivia; 3 berths	Real Potosí (Bolivia 3)	First Stage	2011 Adecuación runner-up
(Brazil) Brazil; 5+1 berths	Santos (Brazil 1)	Second Stage	2011 Copa Libertadores de América champion
(Brazil) Brazil; 5+1 berths	Corinthians (Brazil 2)	Second Stage	2011 Campeonato Brasileiro Série A champion
(Brazil) Brazil; 5+1 berths	Vasco da Gama (Brazil 3)	Second Stage	2011 Copa do Brasil champion
(Brazil) Brazil; 5+1 berths	Fluminense (Brazil 4)	Second Stage	2011 Campeonato Brasileiro Série A 3rd place
(Brazil) Brazil; 5+1 berths	Flamengo (Brazil 5)	First Stage	2011 Campeonato Brasileiro Série A 4th place
(Brazil) Brazil; 5+1 berths	Internacional (Brazil 6)	First Stage	2011 Campeonato Brasileiro Série A 5th place
(Chile) Chile; 3 berths	Universidad de Chile (Chile 1)	Second Stage	2011 Apertura champion and 2011 Copa Sudamericana champion
(Chile) Chile; 3 berths	Universidad Católica (Chile 2)	Second Stage	2011 Primera División aggregate table best non-champion
(Chile) Chile; 3 berths	Unión Española (Chile 3)	First Stage	2011 Primera División aggregate table 2nd best non-champion
(Colombia) Colombia; 3 berths	Atlético Nacional (Colombia 1)	Second Stage	2011 Apertura champion
(Colombia) Colombia; 3 berths	Junior (Colombia 2)	Second Stage	2011 Finalización champion
(Colombia) Colombia; 3 berths	Once Caldas (Colombia 3)	First Stage	2011 Primera A aggregate table best non-champion
(Ecuador) Ecuador; 3 berths	Deportivo Quito (Ecuador 1)	Second Stage	2011 Serie A champion
(Ecuador) Ecuador; 3 berths	Emelec (Ecuador 2)	Second Stage	2011 Serie A runner-up
(Ecuador) Ecuador; 3 berths	El Nacional (Ecuador 3)	First Stage	2011 Serie A 3rd place
(Paraguay) Paraguay; 3 berths	Olimpia (Paraguay 1)	Second Stage	2011 Primera División aggregate table best champion
(Paraguay) Paraguay; 3 berths	Nacional (Paraguay 2)	Second Stage	2011 Primera División aggregate table 2nd best champion
(Paraguay) Paraguay; 3 berths	Libertad (Paraguay 3)	First Stage	2011 Primera División aggregate table best non-champion
(Peru) Peru; 3 berths	Juan Aurich (Peru 1)	Second Stage	2011 Descentralizado champion
(Peru) Peru; 3 berths	Alianza Lima (Peru 2)	Second Stage	2011 Descentralizado runner-up
(Peru) Peru; 3 berths	Sport Huancayo (Peru 3)	First Stage	2011 Descentralizado 3rd place
(Uruguay) Uruguay; 3 berths	Nacional (Uruguay 1)	Second Stage	2010–11 Primera División champion
(Uruguay) Uruguay; 3 berths	Defensor Sporting (Uruguay 2)	Second Stage	2010–11 Primera División runner-up
(Uruguay) Uruguay; 3 berths	Peñarol (Uruguay 3)	First Stage	2010–11 Primera División aggregate table 3rd place
(Venezuela) Venezuela; 3 berths	Deportivo Táchira (Venezuela 1)	Second Stage	2010–11 Primera División champion
(Venezuela) Venezuela; 3 berths	Zamora (Venezuela 2)	Second Stage	2010–11 Primera División runner-up
(Venezuela) Venezuela; 3 berths	Caracas (Venezuela 3)	First Stage	2010–11 Primera División aggregate table best non-finalist
Mexico (CONCACAF); 3 invitees	Guadalajara (Mexico 1)	Second Stage	2011 Apertura classification phase best eligible team
Mexico (CONCACAF); 3 invitees	Cruz Azul (Mexico 2)	Second Stage	2011 Apertura classification phase 2nd best eligible team
Mexico (CONCACAF); 3 invitees	UANL (Mexico 3)	First Stage	2011 Apertura classification phase 3rd best eligible team

== Draw ==
The draw of the tournament was held on November 25, 2011, at 15:00 UTC−03:00, in Luque, Paraguay.

For the first stage, each of the six ties contains one team from each pot. For the second stage, each of the eight groups contains one team from each pot. Teams from the same association in Pots 1 and 3 cannot be placed in the same group. However, a first stage winner may be drawn with a team from the same association in the second stage.

As per agreement when deciding the seeding for the 2011 Copa Libertadores, Bolivia, Chile, Paraguay and Uruguay all had their berth 1 teams be seeded teams for 2012 instead of the berth 1 teams from Colombia, Ecuador, Peru and Venezuela for 2011.

First Stage
Pot 1	Pot 2
(Argentina) Arsenal^{†}; (Brazil) Flamengo^{†}; (Brazil) Internacional^{†}; (Paraguay) Libertad^{†}; (Uruguay) Peñarol; (Mexico) UANL	(Bolivia) Real Potosí^{†}; (Chile) Unión Española^{†}; (Colombia) Once Caldas^{†}; (Ecuador) El Nacional^{†}; (Peru) Sport Huancayo^{†}; (Venezuela) Caracas

Second Stage
Pot 1	Pot 2	Pot 3	Pot 4
(Brazil) Santos; (Argentina) Vélez Sársfield; (Argentina) Boca Juniors^{†}; (Brazil) Corinthians^{†}; (Bolivia) Bolívar; Universidad de Chile; (Paraguay) Olimpia^{†}; (Uruguay) Nacional	(Colombia) Atlético Nacional; (Colombia) Junior^{†}; (Ecuador) Deportivo Quito^{†}; (Ecuador) Emelec^{†}; (Peru) Juan Aurich^{†}; (Peru) Alianza Lima^{†}; (Venezuela) Deportivo Táchira; (Venezuela) Zamora	(Argentina) Lanús^{†}; (Argentina) Godoy Cruz^{†}; (Brazil) Vasco da Gama; (Brazil) Fluminense^{†}; (Bolivia) The Strongest^{†}; (Chile) Universidad Católica^{†}; (Paraguay) Nacional^{†}; (Uruguay) Defensor Sporting	(Argentina) Arsenal^{†}; (Brazil) Flamengo^{†}; (Uruguay) Peñarol; (Paraguay) Libertad^{†}; (Brazil) Internacional^{†}; (Chile) Unión Española^{†}; (Mexico) Guadalajara; (Mexico) Cruz Azul

^{†} Teams had not yet fully qualified to the specific berth when the draw took place.

== Schedule ==
All dates listed are Wednesdays, but matches may be played on the day before (Tuesdays) and after (Thursdays) as well.

Stage	First leg	Second leg
First Stage	January 25	February 1
Second Stage	February 8, 15, 22; March 7, 14, 21, 28; April 4, 11, 18	
Round of 16	April 25; May 2	May 9
Quarterfinals	May 16	May 23
Semifinals	June 13	June 20
Finals	June 27	July 4

== First stage ==
The First Stage, played in home-and-away two-legged format, began on January 24 and ended on February 2. Team 1 played the second leg at home.

Team 1	Agg.	Team 2	1st leg	2nd leg
Sport Huancayo (Peru)	1–4	(Argentina) Arsenal	0–3	1–1
Flamengo (Brazil)	3–2	(Bolivia) Real Potosí	1–2	2–0
Caracas (Venezuela)	1–5	(Uruguay) Peñarol	0–4	1–1
Libertad (Paraguay)	4–2	(Ecuador) El Nacional	0–1	4–1
Once Caldas (Colombia)	2–3	(Brazil) Internacional	0–1	2–2
UANL (Mexico)	2–3	(Chile) Unión Española	0–1	2–2

== Second stage ==
The second stage, played in home-and-away round-robin format, began on February 7 and ended on April 19. The top two teams from each group advanced to the round of 16.

=== Group 1 ===
Pos	Team	Pld	W	D	L	GF	GA	GD	Pts	SAN	INT	STR	AUR
1	(Brazil) Santos	6	4	1	1	12	5	+7	13		3–1	2–0	2–0
2	(Brazil) Internacional	6	2	2	2	10	6	+4	8	1–1		5–0	2–0
3	(Bolivia) The Strongest	6	2	1	3	5	11	−6	7	2–1	1–1		2–1
4	(Peru) Juan Aurich	6	2	0	4	4	9	−5	6	1–3	1–0	1–0	

Legend: Blue = home team win; Yellow = draw; Red = away team win.

=== Group 2 ===
Pos	Team	Pld	W	D	L	GF	GA	GD	Pts	LAN	EME	FLA	OLI
1	(Argentina) Lanús	6	3	1	2	11	6	+5	10		1–0	1–1	6–0
2	(Ecuador) Emelec	6	3	0	3	7	8	−1	9	0–2		3–2	1–0
3	(Brazil) Flamengo	6	2	2	2	12	10	+2	8	3–0	1–0		3–3
4	(Paraguay) Olimpia	6	2	1	3	10	16	−6	7	2–1	2–3	3–2	

Legend: Blue = home team win; Yellow = draw; Red = away team win.

=== Group 3 ===
Pos	Team	Pld	W	D	L	GF	GA	GD	Pts	UE	BOL	JUN	UC
1	(Chile) Unión Española	6	3	1	2	10	7	+3	10		2–1	2–0	1–1
2	(Bolivia) Bolívar	6	3	1	2	9	7	+2	10	1–3		2–1	3–0
3	(Colombia) Junior	6	2	1	3	8	8	0	7	2–1	0–1		3–0
4	(Chile) Universidad Católica	6	1	3	2	6	11	−5	6	2–1	1–1	2–2	

Legend: Blue = home team win; Yellow = draw; Red = away team win.

=== Group 4 ===
Pos	Team	Pld	W	D	L	GF	GA	GD	Pts	FLU	BOC	ARS	ZAM
1	(Brazil) Fluminense	6	5	0	1	7	4	+3	15		0–2	1–0	1–0
2	(Argentina) Boca Juniors	6	4	1	1	9	3	+6	13	1–2		2–0	2–0
3	(Argentina) Arsenal	6	2	0	4	6	7	−1	6	1–2	1–2		3–0
4	(Venezuela) Zamora	6	0	1	5	0	8	−8	1	0–1	0–0	0–1	

Legend: Blue = home team win; Yellow = draw; Red = away team win.

=== Group 5 ===
Pos	Team	Pld	W	D	L	GF	GA	GD	Pts	LIB	VAS	NAC	ALI
1	(Paraguay) Libertad	6	4	1	1	11	7	+4	13		1–1	2–1	4–1
2	(Brazil) Vasco da Gama	6	4	1	1	10	6	+4	13	2–0		1–2	3–2
3	(Uruguay) Nacional	6	2	0	4	5	7	−2	6	1–2	0–1		1–0
4	(Peru) Alianza Lima	6	1	0	5	6	12	−6	3	1–2	1–2	1–0	

Legend: Blue = home team win; Yellow = draw; Red = away team win.

=== Group 6 ===
Pos	Team	Pld	W	D	L	GF	GA	GD	Pts	COR	CAZ	NAC	TAC
1	(Brazil) Corinthians	6	4	2	0	13	2	+11	14		1–0	2–0	6–0
2	(Mexico) Cruz Azul	6	3	2	1	11	4	+7	11	0–0		4–1	4–0
3	(Paraguay) Nacional	6	1	1	4	6	13	−7	4	1–3	1–2		3–2
4	(Venezuela) Deportivo Táchira	6	0	3	3	4	15	−11	3	1–1	1–1	0–0	

Legend: Blue = home team win; Yellow = draw; Red = away team win.

=== Group 7 ===
Pos	Team	Pld	W	D	L	GF	GA	GD	Pts	VEL	QUI	DEF	GDL
1	(Argentina) Vélez Sársfield	6	4	0	2	10	6	+4	12		1–0	1–3	3–0
2	(Ecuador) Deportivo Quito	6	3	1	2	11	4	+7	10	3–0		2–0	5–0
3	(Uruguay) Defensor Sporting	6	3	0	3	6	7	−1	9	0–3	2–0		1–0
4	(Mexico) Guadalajara	6	1	1	4	2	12	−10	4	0–2	1–1	1–0	

Legend: Blue = home team win; Yellow = draw; Red = away team win.

=== Group 8 ===
Pos	Team	Pld	W	D	L	GF	GA	GD	Pts	UCH	ATN	GOD	PEÑ
1	Universidad de Chile	6	4	1	1	11	6	+5	13		2–1	5–1	2–1
2	(Colombia) Atlético Nacional	6	3	2	1	16	8	+8	11	2–0		2–2	3–0
3	(Argentina) Godoy Cruz	6	1	2	3	10	16	−6	5	0–1	4–4		1–0
4	(Uruguay) Peñarol	6	1	1	4	6	13	−7	4	1–1	0–4	4–2	

Legend: Blue = home team win; Yellow = draw; Red = away team win.

== Knockout stages ==
The last four stages of the tournament (round of 16, quarterfinals, semifinals, and finals), played in home-and-away two-legged format, form a single-elimination tournament, contested by the sixteen teams which advance from the Second Stage.

=== Seeding ===
The 16 qualified teams are seeded in the knockout stages according to their results in the second stage, with the group winners seeded 1–8, and the group runners-up seeded 9–16. The teams were ranked by: 1. Points (Pts); 2. Goal difference (GD); 3. Goals scored (GF); 4. Away goals (AG); 5. Drawing of lots.

Teams qualified as group winners
Seed	Team	Pts	GD	GF	AG
1	(Brazil) Fluminense	15	+3	7	5
2	(Brazil) Corinthians	14	+11	13	4
3	(Brazil) Santos	13	+7	12	5
4	Universidad de Chile	13	+5	11	2
5	(Paraguay) Libertad	13	+4	11	4
6	(Argentina) Vélez Sársfield	12	+4	10	5
7	(Argentina) Lanús	10	+5	11	3
8	(Chile) Unión Española	10	+3	10	5

Teams qualified as group runners-up
Seed	Team	Pts	GD	GF	AG
9	(Argentina) Boca Juniors	13	+5	9	4
10	(Brazil) Vasco da Gama	13	+4	10	4
11	(Colombia) Atlético Nacional	11	+8	16	9
12	(Mexico) Cruz Azul	11	+7	11	3
13	(Ecuador) Deportivo Quito	10	+7	11	1
14	(Bolivia) Bolívar	10	+2	9	3
15	(Ecuador) Emelec	9	−1	7	3
16	(Brazil) Internacional	8	+4	10	2

=== Bracket ===
Round of 16
2	(Brazil) Corinthians	0	3
15	(Ecuador) Emelec	0	0
7	(Argentina) Lanús	1	2 (4)
10	(Brazil) Vasco da Gama	2	1 (5)
3	(Brazil) Santos	1	8
14	(Bolivia) Bolívar	2	0
6	(Argentina) Vélez Sársfield	1	1
11	(Colombia) Atlético Nacional	0	1
4	U. de Chile	1	6
13	(Ecuador) Deportivo Quito	4	0
5	(Paraguay) Libertad	1	2
12	(Mexico) Cruz Azul	1	0
1	(Brazil) Fluminense	0	2
16	(Brazil) Internacional	0	1
8	(Chile) Unión Española	1	2
9	(Argentina) Boca Juniors	2	3

Quarterfinals
2	(Brazil) Corinthians	0	1
10	(Brazil) Vasco da Gama	0	0
3	(Brazil) Santos (p)	0	1 (4)
6	(Argentina) Vélez Sársfield	1	0 (2)
4	U. de Chile (p)	1	1 (5)
5	(Paraguay) Libertad	1	1 (3)
1	(Brazil) Fluminense	0	1
9	(Argentina) Boca Juniors	1	1

Semifinals
2	(Brazil) Corinthians	1	1
3	(Brazil) Santos	0	1
4	U. de Chile	0	0
9	(Argentina) Boca Juniors	2	0

Finals
2	(Brazil) Corinthians	1	2
9	(Argentina) Boca Juniors	1	0

=== Round of 16 ===
The Round of 16 began on April 25 and ended on May 10. Team 1 played the second leg at home.

Team 1	Agg.	Team 2	1st leg	2nd leg
Fluminense (Brazil)	2–1	(Brazil) Internacional	0–0	2–1
Corinthians (Brazil)	3–0	(Ecuador) Emelec	0–0	3–0
Santos (Brazil)	9–2	(Bolivia) Bolívar	1–2	8–0
Universidad de Chile	7–4	(Ecuador) Deportivo Quito	1–4	6–0
Libertad (Paraguay)	3–1	(Mexico) Cruz Azul	1–1	2–0
Vélez Sársfield (Argentina)	2–1	(Colombia) Atlético Nacional	1–0	1–1
Lanús (Argentina)	3–3 (4–5 p)	(Brazil) Vasco da Gama	1–2	2–1
Unión Española (Chile)	3–5	(Argentina) Boca Juniors	1–2	2–3

=== Quarter-finals ===
The Quarter-finals began on May 16 and ended on May 24. Team 1 played the second leg at home.

Team 1	Agg.	Team 2	1st leg	2nd leg
Fluminense (Brazil)	1–2	(Argentina) Boca Juniors	0–1	1–1
Corinthians (Brazil)	1–0	(Brazil) Vasco da Gama	0–0	1–0
Santos (Brazil)	1–1 (4–2 p)	(Argentina) Vélez Sársfield	0–1	1–0
Universidad de Chile	2–2 (5–3 p)	(Paraguay) Libertad	1–1	1–1

=== Semi-finals ===
The Semifinals began on June 13 and ended on June 21. Team 1 played the second leg at home.

Team 1	Agg.	Team 2	1st leg	2nd leg
Corinthians (Brazil)	2–1	(Brazil) Santos	1–0	1–1
Universidad de Chile	0–2	(Argentina) Boca Juniors	0–2	0–0

=== Finals ===
The Finals were played over two legs, with the higher-seeded team playing the second leg at home. If the teams were tied on points and goal difference at the end of regulation in the second leg, the away goals rule would not be applied and 30 minutes of extra time would be played. If still tied after extra time, the title would be decided by penalty shootout.

June 27, 2012
21:50 UTC−3

Boca Juniors (Argentina)	1–1	(Brazil) Corinthians
Roncaglia 72'	Report	Romarinho 84'

Estadio Alberto J. Armando (La Bombonera), Buenos Aires
Attendance: 51,901
Referee: Enrique Osses (Chile)

July 4, 2012
21:50 UTC−3

Corinthians (Brazil)	2–0	(Argentina) Boca Juniors
Emerson 53', 72'	Report

Estádio Municipal Paulo Machado de Carvalho (Pacaembu), São Paulo
Attendance: 40,186
Referee: Wilmar Roldán (Colombia)

Corinthians won on points 3–1.

Copa Libertadores de América
2012 Champion

Corinthians
First Title

== Top goalscorers ==
Pos	Player	Club	Goals
1	(Argentina) Matías Alustiza	(Ecuador) Deportivo Quito	8
1	(Brazil) Neymar	(Brazil) Santos	8
3	(Colombia) Dorlan Pabón	(Colombia) Atlético Nacional	7
4	(Chile) Junior Fernándes	Universidad de Chile	6
4	(Brazil) Leandro Damião	(Brazil) Internacional	6
6	(Qatar) Emerson	(Brazil) Corinthians	5
6	(Argentina) Emanuel Herrera	(Chile) Unión Española	5
6	(Mexico) Javier Orozco	(Mexico) Cruz Azul	5
9	(Brazil) Danilo	(Brazil) Corinthians	4
9	(Chile) Ángelo Henríquez	Universidad de Chile	4
9	(Brazil) Alan Kardec	(Brazil) Santos	4
9	(Colombia) Luis Fernando Mosquera	(Colombia) Atlético Nacional	4
9	(Paraguay) José Ariel Núñez	(Paraguay) Libertad	4
9	(Argentina) Mariano Pavone	(Argentina) Lanús	4
9	(Uruguay) Mario Regueiro	(Argentina) Lanús	4
9	(Argentina) Matías Rodríguez	Universidad de Chile	4

== Awards ==
=== Player of the week ===
Week	Player	Team	Notes
Jan 31 – Feb 2	(Argentina) Andrés D'Alessandro	(Brazil) Internacional	
Feb 7–9	(Mexico) Javier Orozco	(Mexico) Cruz Azul	
Feb 14–16	(Bolivia) Pablo Escobar	(Bolivia) The Strongest	
Feb 21–23	(Colombia) Dorlan Pabón	(Colombia) Atlético Nacional	
Mar 6–8	(Portugal) Deco	(Brazil) Fluminense	
Mar 13–15	(Brazil) Leandro Damião	(Brazil) Internacional	
Mar 20–22	(Uruguay) Mario Regueiro	(Argentina) Lanús	
Mar 27–29	(Uruguay) Sergio Órteman	(Paraguay) Olimpia	
Apr 3–5	(Argentina) Luciano Figueroa	(Ecuador) Emelec	
Apr 10–12	(Argentina) Darío Cvitanich	(Argentina) Boca Juniors	
Apr 17–19	(Argentina) Matías Alustiza	(Ecuador) Deportivo Quito	
May 1–3	(Ecuador) Fidel Martínez	(Ecuador) Deportivo Quito	
May 8–10	(Argentina) Juan Román Riquelme	(Argentina) Boca Juniors	
May 16–17	(Argentina) Iván Obolo	(Argentina) Vélez Sársfield	
May 23–24	(Chile) Johnny Herrera	Universidad de Chile	

=== Fair play award ===
The Samsung Fair Play Trophy was awarded to Brazilian club Corinthians.

== Notes ==
Brazilian coach Ricardo Ferretti sent a team of substitutes of Tigres UANL, and was heavily criticized by the Latin press that claimed that he had "ignored" the competition.

== See also ==
- 2012 FIFA Club World Cup
- 2012 Copa Sudamericana
- 2013 Recopa Sudamericana
