= 2012 Copa Libertadores first stage =

The First Stage of the 2012 Copa Santander Libertadores de América ran from January 24 to February 2, 2012 (first legs: January 24–26; second legs: January 31–February 2).

== Format ==
The twelve teams were drawn into six ties on November 25, 2011 in Asunción.

Teams played in two-legged ties on a home-away basis. Each team earned 3 points for a win, 1 point for a draw, and 0 points for a loss. The following criteria were used for breaking ties on points:

1. Goal difference
2. Away goals
3. Penalty shootout (no extra time is played)

The six winners advanced to the second stage to join the 26 automatic qualifiers.

== Matches ==
Team 1 played the second leg at home.

Teams			Scores		Tie-breakers		
Team 1	Points	Team 2	1st leg	2nd leg	GD	AG	Pen.
Sport Huancayo (Peru)	1:4	(Argentina) Arsenal	0–3	1–1	—	—	—
Flamengo (Brazil)	3:3	(Bolivia) Real Potosí	1–2	2–0	+1:−1	—	—
Caracas (Venezuela)	1:4	(Uruguay) Peñarol	0–4	1–1	—	—	—
Libertad (Paraguay)	3:3	(Ecuador) El Nacional	0–1	4–1	+2:−2	—	—
Once Caldas (Colombia)	1:4	(Brazil) Internacional	0–1	2–2	—	—	—
UANL (Mexico)	1:4	(Chile) Unión Española	0–1	2–2	—	—	—

=== Match G1 ===
January 24, 2012
20:15 UTC−03:00

Arsenal (Argentina)	3–0	(Peru) Sport Huancayo
Córdoba 21'; Zelaya 35'; Mosca 87'	Report

Estadio Julio Humberto Grondona, Sarandí
Referee: Paulo Oliveira (Brazil)

January 31, 2012
20:30 UTC−05:00

Sport Huancayo (Peru)	1–1	(Argentina) Arsenal
Ibarra 44'	Report	Leguizamón 85'

Estadio Huancayo, Huancayo
Referee: Martín Vázquez (Uruguay)

Arsenal won on points 4–1.

=== Match G2 ===
January 25, 2012
20:00 UTC−04:00

Real Potosí (Bolivia)	2–1	(Brazil) Flamengo
Centurión 30'; Britez 57'	Report	Luiz Antônio 28'

Estadio Víctor Agustín Ugarte, Potosí
Referee: Líber Prudente (Uruguay)

February 1, 2012
22:00 UTC−02:00

Flamengo (Brazil)	2–0	(Bolivia) Real Potosí
Léo Moura 39'; Ronaldinho 90+2'	Report

Estádio Olímpico João Havelange (Engenhão), Rio de Janeiro
Attendance: 32,004
Referee: Víctor Rivera (Peru)

Tied on points 3–3, Flamengo won on goal difference.

=== Match G3 ===
January 26, 2012
20:45 UTC−02:00

Peñarol (Uruguay)	4–0	(Venezuela) Caracas
Freitas 35'; Zalayeta 38'; João Pedro 63'; Estoyanoff 70'	Report

Estadio Centenario, Montevideo
Referee: Federico Beligoy (Argentina)

February 2, 2012
19:00 UTC−04:30

Caracas (Venezuela)	1–1	(Uruguay) Peñarol
Peraza 77'	Report	Estoyanoff 27'

Estadio Olímpico de la UCV, Caracas
Referee: Sandro Ricci (Brazil)

Peñarol won on points 4–1.

=== Match G4 ===
January 24, 2012
20:30 UTC−05:00

El Nacional (Ecuador)	1–0	(Paraguay) Libertad
J. L. Anangonó 43'	Report

Estadio Olímpico Atahualpa, Quito
Referee: Víctor Rivera (Peru)

January 31, 2012
20:00 UTC−03:00

Libertad (Paraguay)	4–1	(Ecuador) El Nacional
Velázquez 1'; Núñez 29'; Gamarra 34'; Civelli 90+3'	Report	Minda 12'

Estadio Dr. Nicolás Léoz, Asunción
Referee: Sergio Pezzotta (Argentina)

Tied on points 3–3, Libertad won on goal difference.

=== Match G5 ===
January 25, 2012
22:00 UTC−02:00

Internacional (Brazil)	1–0	(Colombia) Once Caldas
Leandro Damião 11'	Report

Estádio José Pinheiro Borda (Beira-Rio), Porto Alegre
Attendance: 33,000
Referee: Martín Vázquez (Uruguay)

February 1, 2012
19:00 UTC−05:00

Once Caldas (Colombia)	2–2	(Brazil) Internacional
Núñez 2' (pen.); González 24'	Report	D'Alessandro 11' (pen.); Tinga 21'

Estadio Palogrande, Manizales
Referee: Francisco Chacón (Mexico)

Internacional won on points 4–1.

=== Match G6 ===
January 25, 2012
18:50 UTC−03:00

Unión Española (Chile)	1–0	(Mexico) UANL
Barriga 58'	Report

Estadio Santa Laura-Universidad SEK, Santiago
Referee: Alfredo Intriago (Ecuador)

February 2, 2012
20:00 UTC−06:00

UANL (Mexico)	2–2	(Chile) Unión Española
Pulido 14', 22'	Report	Herrera 38' (pen.); Jaime 68'

Estadio Universitario, San Nicolás de los Garza
Referee: Saúl Laverni (Argentina)

Unión Española won on points 4–1.
