= Emerson Sheik =

Brazilian-Qatari footballer (born 1978)

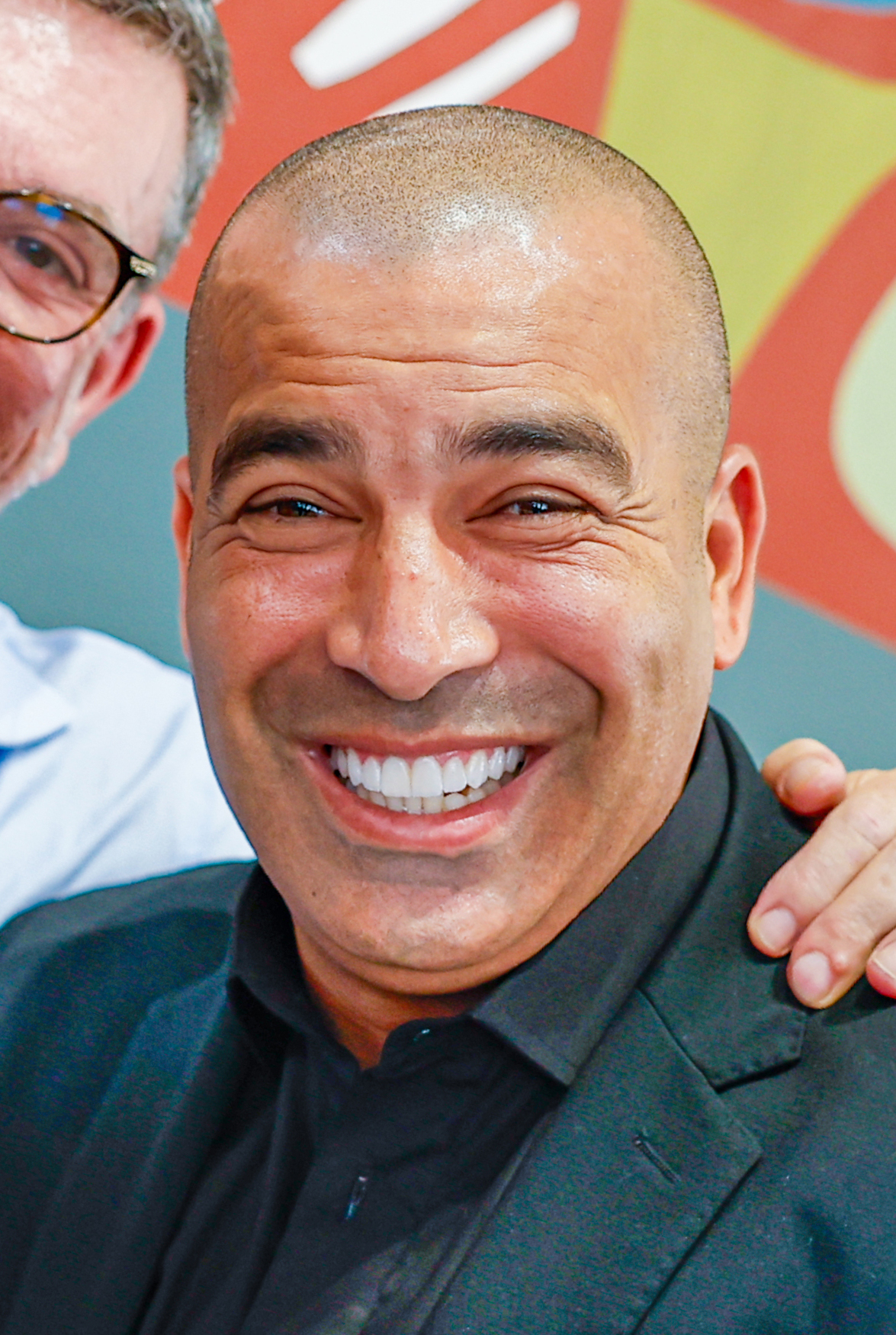
- Emerson in October 2024

Personal information
- Full name: Márcio Passos de Albuquerque
- Date of birth: 6 September 1978 (age 48)
- Place of birth: Nova Iguaçu, Brazil
- Height: 1.71 m (5 ft 7 in)
- Position: Forward

Youth career
- 1996–1998: São Paulo

Senior career*
Years	Team	Apps	(Gls)
1998–1999	São Paulo	11	(2)
2000	Consadole Sapporo	34	(31)
2001	Kawasaki Frontale	18	(19)
2001–2005	Urawa Red Diamonds	100	(71)
2005–2007	Al-Sadd	32	(24)
2007	Rennes	3	(0)
2008–2009	Al-Sadd	2	(0)
2009	Flamengo	14	(7)
2009–2010	Al Ain	14	(9)
2010–2011	Fluminense	11	(8)
2011–2015	Corinthians	75	(12)
2014	→ Botafogo (loan)	15	(6)
2015–2016	Flamengo	32	(5)
2017	Ponte Preta	23	(4)
2018	Corinthians	17	(0)
Total		401	(198)

International career
1999	Brazil U20	6	(0)
2008	Qatar	3	(0)
- * Club domestic league appearances and goals as of 21 December 2009

Márcio Passos de Albuquerque (born 6 September 1978), known as Emerson Sheik or just Emerson, is a former professional footballer who played as a forward. Born in Brazil, he represented Qatar internationally, leading to his nickname of "Sheik".

== Club career ==
=== Early days ===
Emerson Sheik was born in Nova Iguaçu and made his senior debut for São Paulo FC in 1998.

=== Japan and Qatar ===
In 2000, Emerson Sheik joined Consadole Sapporo in the Japanese second division, for whom he scored 31 goals in 34 games during the 2000 season. After the season, he joined another second division club, Kawasaki Frontale, where he continued his impressive goalscoring record, netting 19 times in 18 league games. Midway through the 2001 season, however, he left to join the Urawa Red Diamonds, for whom he yet again excelled, scoring 71 league goals in 100 appearances. Al-Sadd bought Emerson for US$8 million in 2005 and paired him with Ecuadorian Carlos Tenorio.

=== Rennes and return to Al-Sadd ===
On 25 August 2007, Emerson Sheik signed a three-year contract with French side Rennes. However, he could not break into the first team. Meanwhile, Al-Sadd were going through a lean phase. They had many bad results and were 14 points behind unbeaten leaders Al Ahli by the end of 2007. In addition, their new import Mauro Zárate did not link up well with Carlos Tenorio up front. On 19 December, Al-Sadd announced Emerson's return to fulfill fans' demands.

=== Flamengo ===
On 1 February 2009, Emerson Sheik signed a season-long deal with Flamengo after leaving Al-Sadd as a free agent. He formed a fearsome strike partnership with Adriano, helping the Mengão win the 2009 Brasileirão Série A after a relatively bad start. Club legend Andrade praised both players' performances.

=== Al Ain ===
On 24 July 2009, he signed a two-year deal with Emirati side Al Ain. He was presented to the press on 6 September 2009 and was handed the number 8 shirt.

=== Fluminense ===
On 19 July 2010, Emerson signed for Fluminense. On 5 December 2010, Emerson scored the winning goal for Fluminense to conquer the Brasileirão Série A title, making him a Brazilian champion for two years in a row.

=== Corinthians ===
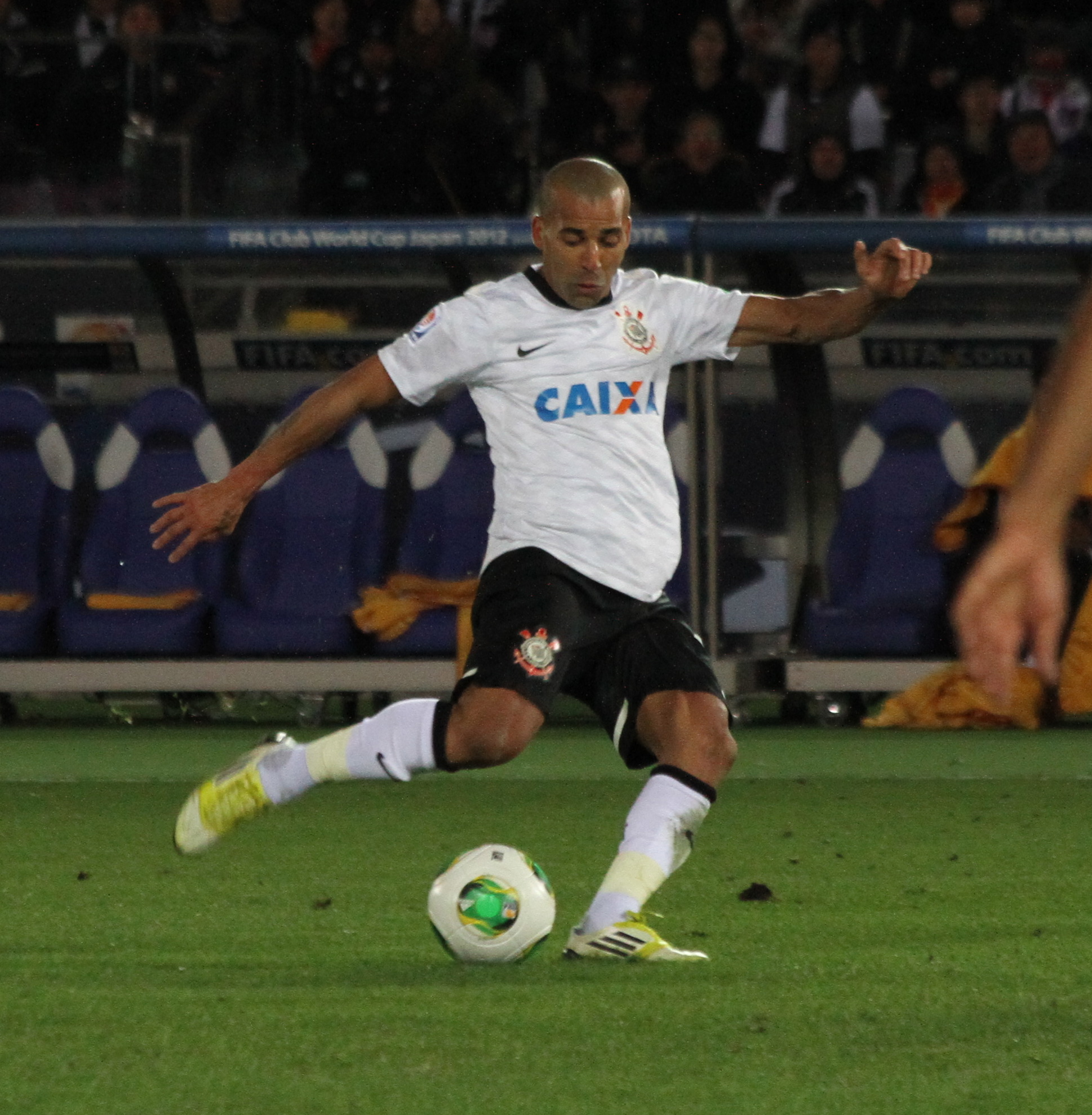
Emerson with Corinthians in the 2012 FIFA Club World Cup Final

On 11 April 2011, Emerson Sheik signed for Corinthians. On 4 December 2011, he won his third Brazilian championship in a row with the Timão, making him the first player in history to win three straight Brazilian championships with three different teams.

On 4 July 2012, Emerson scored two goals in the second match of the 2012 Copa Libertadores Finals, helping Corinthians to win their first Copa Libertadores. On 16 December 2012, he was part of the Corinthians team which won the 2012 FIFA Club World Cup, beating Chelsea 1–0. In the last few minutes of the game, he was involved in an off-the-ball incident with Gary Cahill, in which Emerson fell to the ground holding his face. Cahill received a red card, but the Englishman claimed Emerson fouled him first before diving.

In an interview for Esporte Espetacular, an attraction of Rede Globo, Emerson showed his dislike for Mano Menezes, coach of the club. Emerson Sheik told reporters: "I do not wanna work with him [Mano] anymore." Still, according to the former Corinthiano: "I think he [Mano] is a very limited coach. I did not see anything special in him, and I do not think he will improve, because he does not have the humility to ask something."

Emerson Sheik returned to Corinthians in 2015 as Tite returned to the club as the new manager. He was a first choice for many of the first games of the season, including the 2015 Copa Libertadores. After Corinthians was eliminated in the Round of 16, the club opted against renegotiating Emerson's contract, due to end in 31 July of the same year. He was released on 12 June, after both sides reached an agreement on the matter.

=== Botafogo ===
In February 2014, he was loaned to Botafogo, his third club in Rio de Janeiro, Brazil. He took the shirt number seven, used before by Botafogo's biggest idol, Garrincha.

I was born and grew up in a very simple place, and I saw things that most of you (journalists) probably haven't seen. You asked me if I'd feel pressure, or like that, when playing at La Bombonera. Pressure is sleeping afraid of stray bullets hitting your face, your chest, that's pressure. Playing in a packed stadium, with a brand new ball, perfect grass, that's something to enjoy, not to feel pressured.

— Emerson Sheik, after the title of 2012 Copa Libertadores

== International career ==
Emerson Sheik played 1999 South American Youth Championship for U-20 Brazil, while he was still known as aged 18 instead of 21. He was offered Qatari citizenship by Al-Sadd so that they could accommodate one more foreign player in their line-up. He accepted and he became a Qatari citizen in 2008. He made his international debut for the Qatar national team on 4 March 2008 in a friendly against Bahrain. He also played the next friendly, vs. Jordan, on 16 March and a World Cup qualifying match, vs. Iraq, on 26 March.

In April 2008, it was revealed that Emerson Sheik had also played for the Brazil under-20 team which makes him ineligible to play for the Qatari national team. Taking that into consideration, and that he represented Qatar in the World Cup qualifier against Iraq on 26 March, Qatar breached the FIFA rules, and Qatar could have lost the three points they gained from the game against Iraq. FIFA confirmed the breach of laws but said that QFA is not responsible for any wrongdoing, and that Emerson has since not played for Qatar. Although FIFA has loosened the nationality transfer of uncapped players and players with multi-nationality, it was not beneficial to Emerson, because he did not hold multi-nationality when representing Brazil.

== Controversy ==
Emerson Sheik was detained by the Brazilian federal police on his way back to Qatar on 20 January 2006 for allegedly falsifying a birth certificate to show that he was three years younger than his actual age. The fake birth certificate, which was used to issue his passport, said that he was born on 6 December 1981 in Nova Iguaçu with the name "Márcio Emerson Passos", but his original shows he was born 6 September 1978, with the name "Márcio Passos de Albuquerque".

=== Kiss issue ===
On 25 August 2013, after the 1–0 victory over Coritiba in the Brasileirão, Emerson Sheik celebrated by kissing his friend and posting the photo on Instagram.

On 26 August, one day after the incident, homophobic Corinthians supporters protested the kiss during a training session. Emerson Sheik called the protests an "idiotic prejudice".

On 28 August, in the first game after the incident, a 1–0 loss against Luverdense in the 2013 Copa do Brasil, Emerson Sheik was sent off along with opposition player Zé Roberto after they argued. Speaking to the press after the game, Zé Roberto, in reference to Emerson, said: "I am not the guy that takes a kiss from anyone, I do not accept this kind of thing."

== Career statistics ==
=== Club ===
Club performance			League		Cup		League Cup		Continental		Domestic League		Total	
Season	Club	League	Apps	Goals	Apps	Goals	Apps	Goals	Apps	Goals	Apps	Goals	Apps	Goals
Brazil			League		Copa do Brasil		League Cup		South America		Campeonato Paulista		Total	
1998	São Paulo	Série A	3	0	-		-		-		0	0	3	0
1999	São Paulo	Série A	8	2	-		-		-		0	0	8	2
Japan			League		Emperor's Cup		League Cup		Asia		Domestic League		Total	
2000	Consadole Sapporo	J1 League	34	31	0	0	1	0	-		0	0	35	31
2001	Kawasaki Frontale	J1 League	18	19	0	0	1	1	-		0	0	19	20
2001	Urawa Reds	J1 League	13	7	0	0	1	0	-		0	0	14	7
2002	Urawa Reds	J1 League	24	15	0	0	6	6	-		0	0	30	21
2003	Urawa Reds	J1 League	25	18	0	0	9	8	-		0	0	34	26
2004	Urawa Reds	J1 League	26	27	0	0	6	4	-		0	0	32	31
2005	Urawa Reds	J1 League	12	4	0	0	5	5	-		0	0	17	9
Qatar			League		Emir of Qatar Cup		League Cup		Asia		Domestic League		Total	
2005–06	Al-Sadd	Qatari League	7	6	1	0	3	2	1	1	0	0	12	9
2006–07	Al-Sadd	Qatari League	25	18	3	1	8	6	2	2	0	0	38	27
France			League		Coupe de France		Coupe de la Ligue		Europe		Domestic League		Total	
2007–08	Rennes	Ligue 1	3	0	-		-		-		0	0	6	0
Qatar			League		Emir of Qatar Cup		League Cup		Asia		Domestic League		Total	
2007–08	Al-Sadd	Qatari League	2	0	2	2	3	2	4	2	0	0	11	6
2008–09	Al-Sadd	Qatari League	0	0	0	0	4	8	0	0	0	0	4	8
Brazil			League		Copa do Brasil		League Cup		South America		Campeonato Carioca		Total	
2009	Clube de Regatas do Flamengo	Série A	14	7	5	3	-		5	1	2	0	26	11
United Arab Emirates			League		UAE President's Cup		League Cup		Asia		Domestic League		Total	
2009–10	Al Ain	UAE Pro League	14	9	5	4	-		3	1	0	0	22	14
Brazil			League		Copa do Brasil		League Cup		South America		Campeonato Carioca		Total	
2010	Fluminense	Série A	12	8	0	0	0	0	0	0	0	0	12	8
2011	Fluminense	Série A	0	0	0	0	0	0	2	0	7	1	9	1
Brazil			League		Copa do Brasil		League Cup		South America		Campeonato Paulista		Total	
2011	Corinthians	Série A	28	6	0	0	0	0	0	0	0	0	28	6
2012	Corinthians	Série A	14	4	0	0	0	0	13	5	10	3	39*	12
2013	Corinthians	Série A	30	2	3	0	0	0	8	0	18	3	59	5
2014	Corinthians	Série A	0	0	0	0	0	0	0	0	9	0	9	0
Brazil			League		Copa do Brasil		League Cup		South America		Campeonato Carioca		Total	
2014	Botafogo	Série A	15	6	3	0	0	0	0	0	0	0	18	6
Brazil			League		Copa do Brasil		League Cup		South America		Campeonato Paulista		Total	
2015	Corinthians	Série A	3	0	0	0	0	0	7	1	7	2	20*	3
Brazil			League		Copa do Brasil		Primeira Liga		South America		Campeonato Carioca		Total	
2015	Flamengo	Série A	22	5	3	0	0	0	0	0	0	0	21*	5
2016	Flamengo	Série A	10	0	2	0	3	0	3	1	10	4	28	5
Total	Brazil		159	40	16	3	3	0	38	8	63	13	280	64
Total	Japan		152	121	0	0	29	24	-		0	0	181	145
Total	Saudi Arabia		34	24	6	3	18	18	7	5	0	0	65	50
Total	France		3	0	0	0	0	0	3	0	0	0	6	0
Total	Career total		362	194	27	10	50	42	78	14	63	13	554	273

FIFA Club World Cup

Season	Club	League	Apps	Goals
2012	Corinthians	FIFA Club World Cup	2	0
Total	–	–	2	0

* Friendly

=== International ===
Qatar national team
Year	Apps	Goals
2008	3	0
Total	3	0

== Honors ==
Consadole Sapporo

- J1 League: 2000

Urawa Reds

- J.League Cup: 2003

Al Ain

- Emirates Cup: 2009

Flamengo

- Campeonato Brasileiro Série A: 2009
- Campeonato Carioca: 2009
- Taça Rio: 2009

Fluminense

- Campeonato Brasileiro Série A: 2010

Corinthians

- Campeonato Brasileiro Série A: 2011, 2015
- Campeonato Paulista: 2013, 2018
- Copa Libertadores: 2012
- Recopa Sudamericana: 2013
- FIFA Club World Cup: 2012

Individual

- J.League MVP Award: 2003
- J.League Top Scorer: 2004
- J.League Best XI: 2002, 2003, 2004
- Qatar National First Division MVP: 2006
- Copa Libertadores: 2012 Best Player
