= Pablo Ledesma =

Argentine footballer

Personal information
- Full name: Pablo Martín Ledesma
- Date of birth: 4 February 1984 (age 42)
- Place of birth: La Falda, Argentina
- Height: 1.75 m (5 ft 9 in)
- Position: Midfielder

Team information
- Current team: Boca Juniors (youth)

Youth career
- Talleres de Córdoba

Senior career*
Years	Team	Apps	(Gls)
2001–2003	Talleres de Córdoba	2	(0)
2003–2008	Boca Juniors	106	(10)
2008–2011	Catania	76	(4)
2012–2015	Boca Juniors	59	(3)
2015–2018	Colón	79	(7)
2018–2019	Patronato	10	(1)
2019–2020	Alvarado	20	(0)
2020	Messina	0	(0)
Total		352	(25)

International career
2007	Argentina	4	(0)

Managerial career
- 2021–: Boca Juniors (youth)
- * Club domestic league appearances and goals

Pablo Martín Ledesma (born 4 February 1984) is a retired Argentine professional footballer who played as a midfielder.

A well balanced player, who was able to play both on the right wing and in the centre. He was mainly known for his speed and passing ability.

== Club career ==
=== Talleres de Córdoba ===
Ledesma was born in La Falda, Córdoba. During the summer of 2001, he officially transferred to Talleres de Córdoba and began in the youth team. In his lone season with the Córdoba based club, Ledesma did manage 2 first team appearances. After several impressive performances, the former River Plate player, was scouted by Boca Juniors, but before moving to Boca's youth divisions he played for Fútbol Juvenil FC.

=== Boca Juniors ===
In the summer of 2003, Ledesma officially transferred to Boca Juniors at the age of 19. His debut for Boca was on July 12, 2003, when Boca lost 2–1 to Colón de Santa Fe. In the Copa Libertadores 2007 Ledesma was a driving force down the right side of midfield for the eventual Champions. Ledesma also scored a clever close-range flick against Colombia's Cúcuta in the Semi Final 1st leg and a brave header at the end of the 1st Leg of the Final against Gremio. After 5 impressive seasons with the Argentine giants, that included well over 100 appearances and 15 total goal, he was monitored by several European clubs, and soon transferred to the Italian Serie A, with Sicilian giants Calcio Catania.

=== Calcio Catania ===
He was officially signed by Catania during the 2008/2009 summer transfer window. He was one of 12 players signed by the Sicilian club during that window, listing Catania as one of the league's most active clubs in the transfer market, along with Sicilian rivals US Città di Palermo. In his first season with the club, Ledesma was regularly a part of the club's first team under, then coach, Walter Zenga, making 24 league appearances, scoring 2 goals in the process. In his second season with the club, the 26-year-old Ledesma, was hampered by injuries, and found playing time harder to come by under Siniša Mihajlović, as he was not fully fit for the majority of the season. Ledesma made just 16 appearances in the duration of the 2009–10 Serie A season, but helped to guide Catania to a 13th place league finish, also reaching a record points total for the club. He has since re-established himself back into Catania's starting line-up and made 30 appearances during the 2010-11 campaign, bringing his total appearances for the club up to 74, helping the club to a 13th-place finish in the league and a record points total in Serie A for a third consecutive season.

=== Boca Juniors ===
In the winter in Europe of 2012, Pablo Ledesma abandoned Calcio Catania to return to Argentina after three years and played in Boca Juniors. By Twitter one of his partner insult him when he left Calcio Catania, and saying that the club was very supportive when he left Boca Juniors. Back in Argentina he played for the first time in a friendly match with River Plate on the Derby of Argentina. Boca won 2–0 with two goals from Nicolas Blandi, while Ledesma also played a great match.

== International career ==
Ledesma made his senior debut with the Argentina national football team against Chile on 18 April 2007.

== Retirement and coaching career ==
After a failed spell at Italian club FC Messina in the summer 2020, which was ruined by the Covid pandemic and, from what he reported, serious family problems, Ledesma decided to announce his retirement in February 2021, after failing to find a new club.

After the retirement, he returned to Boca Juniors, where he was hired as a youth coach.

== Honours ==
Boca Juniors

- Primera División Argentina: Apertura 2003, Apertura 2005, Clausura 2006
- Recopa Sudamericana: 2005, 2006
- Copa Sudamericana: 2004, 2005
- Copa Libertadores: 2007
