= Alfredo Intriago =

Ecuadorian football referee

- Full name: Alfredo Intriago Ortega
- Born: 4 December 1970 (age 55); Ecuador

Domestic
| Years | League | Role |

International
| Years | League | Role |
| 2004– | FIFA listed | Referee |

Alfredo Intriago Ortega (Note: In this Spanish name, the first or paternal surname is Intriago and the second or maternal family name is Ortega.) (born 4 December 1970) is an Ecuadorian international referee who refereed at the 2010 and 2014 FIFA World Cup qualifiers.
