= Estadio La Huerta =

Stadium in Asunción, Paraguay

Coordinates: 25.277830°S 57.611023°W

Estadio Tigo La Huerta
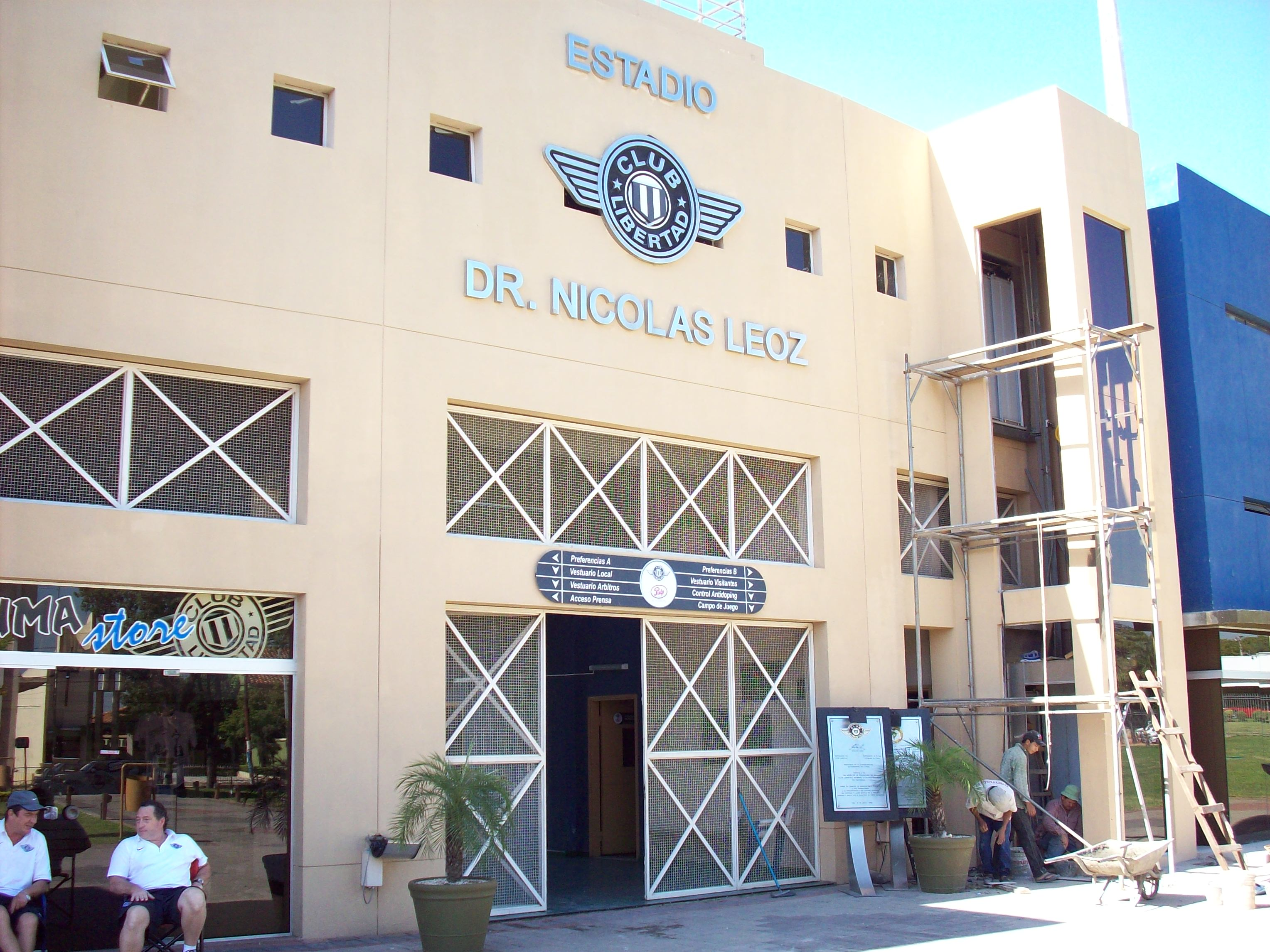
- Interactive map of Estadio Tigo La Huerta
- Full name: Estadio Tigo La Huerta
- Owner: Club Libertad
- Capacity: 15,000
- Surface: Grass
- Field size: 107 x 73 m

Construction
- Built: 2005
- Opened: 2005

Tenant
- Club Libertad

The Estadio Tigo La Huerta (formerly known as Estadio Dr. Nicolás Léoz) is a hybrid grass football stadium in Asunción, Paraguay. It is the home venue of Club Libertad. The stadium has a capacity of 15,000 after a renovation in the 2020s.
