= Luis Fernando Mosquera =

Colombian footballer (born 1986)

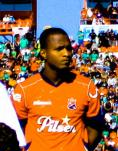
- Mosquera in 2011

Personal information
- Full name: Luis Fernando Mosquera Alomia
- Date of birth: 17 August 1986 (age 40)
- Place of birth: Buenaventura, Colombia
- Height: 1.75 m (5 ft 9 in)
- Position: Attacking midfielder

Senior career*
Years	Team	Apps	(Gls)
2005–2007	Deportes Quindío	?	(?)
2008–2011	Santa Fe	41	(11)
2009	→ Independiente Medellín (loan)	22	(8)
2010	→ Chiapas (loan)	6	(0)
2010–2011	→ Independiente Medellín (loan)	41	(16)
2012–2013	Atletico Nacional	33	(14)
2014–2015	Deportivo Cali	10	(1)
2015	Independiente Medellín	0	(0)
2016	Real Cartagena	17	(2)
2017–2018	Universitario Popayán	30	(7)
2019	Alianza Petrolera	4	(0)
2020	Boca Juniors de Cali	12	(1)

International career
2008–2009	Colombia	3	(1)
- * Club domestic league appearances and goals as of 28 October 2020

Luis Fernando Mosquera Alomia (born 17 August 1986) is a Colombian footballer.

== Club career ==
Mosquera began his career with Deportes Quindío in the Colombian Categoria Primera B in 2005. On 17 November 2007, he scored two goals against Independiente Medellin in a comeback 3–4 victory at Atanasio Girardot, which left Medellin out of the top 8 seeds for the playoffs. He had a great 2007-II season, scoring eight goals and forming a partnership with Edison Toloza, who scored nine goals.

In 2008, he joined Independiente Santa Fe. He scored eight goals in the 2008-II tournament and had a good performance, but in the 2009-I tournament, new manager Hernán Darío Gómez didn't give him much playing time, so he only scored four goals, also because of various injuries he suffered. In June 2009, he was loaned out to Independiente Medellin, where he scored many important goals, such as the two goals he scored against Junior in the playoffs on 9 December, to help Medellin qualify for the finals. In the finals against Huila, he scored a goal in the second leg, which eventually helped the club win the 2009-II tournament.

In January 2010, he joined Jaguares de Chiapas along with his Medellin teammate, Jackson Martínez. After playing only six games and scoring no goals, he returned to Independiente Medellin and stayed there until December 2011. In January 2012 he joined Atletico Nacional, where he won three titles: the 2012 Copa Colombia, the Superliga Colombiana, and the 2013-I tournament, scoring a goal in the second leg of the finals against Santa Fe. In July 2013, he joined Deportivo Cali. Cali made the final of the 2013-II tournament that year, but lost to Mosquera's former club, Atletico Nacional.

== International career ==
Mosquera debuted for Colombia on 30 April 2008, in a friendly match against Venezuela as a substitute in the 80th minute. He scored his first international goal only a few minutes after coming into the game, scoring the fifth goal for Colombia which they won 5–2.

== Honours ==
Season	Club	Title
2009-II	Independiente Medellín	Categoría Primera A
2012	Atlético Nacional	Copa Colombia
2012	Atlético Nacional	Superliga Colombiana
