= Enrique Osses =

Chilean football referee

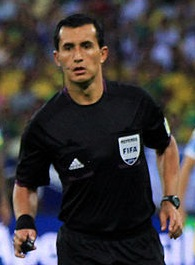
- Full name: Enrique Roberto Osses Zenkovic
- Born: 26 May 1974 (age 52); Santiago, Chile

Domestic
| Years | League | Role |
| 2003–2016 | Chilean Primera División | Referee |

International
| Years | League | Role |
| 2005–2016 | FIFA listed | Referee |

Enrique Roberto Osses Zencovic (born May 26, 1974) is a football referee from Chile for Asociación Nacional de Fútbol Profesional de Chile (ANFP) and CONMEBOL. Osses has officiated international matches which include the 2011 Copa América, Copa Sudamericana, Copa Libertadores, 2010 and 2014 South American World Cup qualifiers, and the 2009 South American Youth Championship.

In 2005, he sent off 21 players in 16 league games. During a 2005 match that faced San Felipe against Unión Española, the latter's goalkeeper Ignacio González received his second yellow card, and consequently a red card. Upset by this, González brought Osses to the ground after hitting him in the face. Afterwards the player was held in police custody for two hours. He faced a ban of up to 50 matches, which he did not serve because he left the team, to play in Argentina.

In March 2013, FIFA named Osses to its list of 52 candidate referees for the 2014 FIFA World Cup in Brazil.

Since March 2021 until February 2025, he served as Director of Referre Instruction for the Mexican Football Federation.

In February 2025, Osses assumed as Chairman of the Referee Committee of Costa Rica.

In November 2026, Osses assumed as Refeering Technical Director of the United Arab Emirates Football Association.
