= 2016 São Paulo FC season =

São Paulo
2016 season
- Chairman: Carlos Augusto de Barros e Silva (Leco)
- Manager: Edgardo Bauza (until 4 August); André Jardine (caretaker); Ricardo Gomes (until 20 November); Pintado (caretaker)
- Stadium: Estádio do Morumbi
- Série A: 10th
- Campeonato Paulista: Quarter-finals
- Copa Libertadores: Semi-finals
- Copa do Brasil: Round of 16
- Top goalscorer: League: Andrés Chávez (9 goals); All: Jonathan Calleri (16 goals)
- Highest home attendance: 61,766 (v Atlético Nacional in Copa Libertadores)
- Lowest home attendance: 3,013 (v Mogi Mirim in Campeonato Paulista)
Home colours	Away colours	Third colours

The 2016 season was São Paulo's 87th year since the club's existence. During the season São Paulo played 4 championships, 3 nationals (Campeonato Paulista, Copa do Brasil, Série A) and 1 continental (Copa Libertadores). The club took his best performance in the continental tournament reaching the semifinals being defeated by Colombian club Atlético Nacional in two legs (0–2 Home; 1–2 Away). In Campeonato Paulista, championship of State of São Paulo, Tricolor fall in the quarterfinals against Audax, losing the single leg in the opponent's home. Playing the national cup, Copa do Brasil, The Dearest was eliminated by Juventude in away goal rule after an aggregated final score of 2–2 (1–2 Home; 1–0 Away). São Paulo ended the year reaching the 10th place in the league with the same number of wins, 14, and 10 draws. A fewer weeks after the end of Copa Libertadores, the Argentine head coach, Edgardo Bauza was chosen by Argentine Football Association to lead the National Team, leaving the club at the beginning of August.

== Players ==
Note: Flags indicate national team as defined under FIFA eligibility rules; some limited exceptions apply. Players may hold more than one non-FIFA nationality.

No.	Pos.	Nation	Player
1	GK	BRA	Denis (vice-captain)
2	DF	BRA	Bruno
3	DF	BRA	Rodrigo Caio
4	DF	BRA	Lucão
5	DF	URU	Diego Lugano
6	DF	BRA	Carlinhos
7	MF	BRA	Michel Bastos
8	MF	BRA	Daniel
9	FW	ARG	Andrés Chávez (on loan from Boca Juniors)
11	MF	BRA	Wesley
13	MF	PER	Christian Cueva
14	FW	BRA	David Neres
15	MF	BRA	João Schmidt
16	DF	BRA	Douglas
17	FW	BRA	Gilberto
18	DF	ARG	Julio Buffarini
19	DF	BRA	Lyanco

No.	Pos.	Nation	Player
20	MF	BRA	Jean Carlos (on loan from São Bernardo)
21	DF	CHI	Eugenio Mena (on loan from Cruzeiro)
22	GK	BRA	Renan Ribeiro
23	MF	BRA	Thiago Mendes
24	GK	BRA	Léo
25	MF	BRA	Hudson (captain)
26	DF	BRA	Auro Jr.
27	DF	BRA	Maicon
28	DF	BRA	Matheus Reis
29	FW	BRA	Robson (on loan from Paraná Clube)
30	FW	BRA	Kelvin (on loan from Porto)
31	FW	BRA	Luiz Araújo
33	MF	BRA	Artur
35	FW	BRA	Pedro Bortoluzo
37	MF	BRA	Wellington

=== Reserve players ===
Note: Flags indicate national team as defined under FIFA eligibility rules; some limited exceptions apply. Players may hold more than one non-FIFA nationality.

No.	Pos.	Nation	Player
32	MF	BRA	Banguelê
34	DF	BRA	Felipe Araruna
36	DF	BRA	Lucas Kal
38	DF	BRA	Caíque

No.	Pos.	Nation	Player
—	DF	BRA	Éder Militão
—	MF	BRA	Lucas Fernandes
—	FW	BRA	Ytalo
—	DF	BRA	Breno

=== Out on loan ===
Note: Flags indicate national team as defined under FIFA eligibility rules; some limited exceptions apply. Players may hold more than one non-FIFA nationality.

No.	Pos.	Nation	Player
—	FW	BRA	Ademilson (on loan to Gamba Osaka)
—	MF	BRA	Roni (on loan to Ceará)
—	DF	BRA	Lucas Farias (on loan to Estoril Praia)
16	DF	BRA	Reinaldo (on loan to Ponte Preta)
—	DF	BRA	Thiago Carleto (on loan to XV de Piracicaba)
—	FW	BRA	Luiz Araújo (on loan to Novorizontino)
26	DF	BRA	Auro Jr. (on loan to Linense)
—	MF	BRA	Matheus Queiroz (on loan to Boa Esporte)
17	FW	BRA	Rogério (on loan to Sport)
—	MF	BRA	Roni (on loan to Adanaspor)
—	FW	BRA	João Paulo (on loan to Bahia)
20	FW	ARG	Ricardo Centurión (on loan to Boca Juniors)
16	DF	BRA	Mateus Caramelo (on loan to Chapecoense)

=== Transfers ===
==== In ====
Note: Flags indicate national team as defined under FIFA eligibility rules; some limited exceptions apply. Players may hold more than one non-FIFA nationality.

No.	Pos.	Nation	Player
16	DF	BRA	Mateus Caramelo (return from Chapecoense)
21	DF	CHI	Eugenio Mena (on loan from Cruzeiro)
5	DF	URU	Diego Lugano (from Cerro Porteño)
9	FW	BRA	Kieza (from Shanghai Shenxin)
12	FW	ARG	Jonathan Calleri (on loan from Deportivo Maldonado)
30	FW	BRA	Kelvin (on loan from Porto)
27	DF	BRA	Maicon (on loan from Porto)
26	DF	BRA	Auro Jr. (return from Linense)
31	FW	BRA	Luiz Araújo (return from Novorizontino)
37	FW	BRA	Ytalo (from Audax)
13	MF	PER	Christian Cueva (from Toluca)
17	FW	BRA	Gilberto (from Chicago Fire)
16	DF	BRA	Douglas (from FC Dnipro)
9	FW	ARG	Andrés Chávez (on loan from Boca Juniors)
18	DF	ARG	Julio Buffarini (from San Lorenzo)
29	FW	BRA	Robson (on loan from Paraná Clube)
20	MF	BRA	Jean Carlos (on loan from São Bernardo)

==== Out ====
Note: Flags indicate national team as defined under FIFA eligibility rules; some limited exceptions apply. Players may hold more than one non-FIFA nationality.

No.	Pos.	Nation	Player
—	GK	BRA	Rogério Ceni (retired)
—	FW	BRA	Luís Fabiano (end of contract)
—	FW	BRA	Alexandre Pato (return to Corinthians)
—	DF	BRA	Edson Silva (end of contract)
—	MF	BRA	Maicon (to Grêmio)
—	DF	BRA	Luis Ricardo (to Botafogo)
9	FW	BRA	Kieza (to Vitória)
13	FW	COL	Wilder Guisao (return to Toluca)
—	FW	BRA	Ewandro (to Udinese)
12	FW	ARG	Jonathan Calleri (return to Deportivo Maldonado)
14	FW	BRA	Alan Kardec (to Chongqing Lifan)
10	MF	BRA	Paulo Henrique Ganso (to Sevilla)
—	DF	BRA	Thiago Carleto (to Arouca)

== Statistics ==
=== Appearances and goals ===
No.	Pos	Nat	Player	Total		Campeonato Paulista		Copa Libertadores		Campeonato Brasileiro		Copa do Brasil	
No.	Pos	Nat	Player	Apps	Goals	Apps	Goals	Apps	Goals	Apps	Goals	Apps	Goals
1	GK	(Brazil) BRA	Denis	40	0	16+0	0	13+0	0	11+0	0	0+0	0
2	DF	(Brazil) BRA	Bruno	36	0	11+1	0	14+0	0	9+1	0	0+0	0
3	DF	(Brazil) BRA	Rodrigo Caio	28	2	12+0	2	13+0	0	3+0	0	0+0	0
4	DF	(Brazil) BRA	Lucão	10	0	3+1	0	2+1	0	3+0	0	0+0	0
5	DF	(Uruguay) URU	Diego Lugano	19	2	7+0	0	3+1	0	8+0	2	0+0	0
6	DF	(Brazil) BRA	Carlinhos	19	0	10+2	0	2+3	0	1+1	0	0+0	0
7	MF	(Brazil) BRA	Michel Bastos	28	5	8+2	2	11+2	3	4+1	0	0+0	0
8	MF	(Brazil) BRA	Daniel	9	0	7+0	0	0+1	0	0+1	0	0+0	0
11	MF	(Brazil) BRA	Wesley	21	0	4+4	0	5+4	0	4+0	0	0+0	0
13	MF	(Peru) PER	Christian Cueva	1	0	0+0	0	0+0	0	1+0	0	0+0	0
15	MF	(Brazil) BRA	João Schmidt	18	2	5+1	0	3+0	1	7+2	1	0+0	0
16	DF	(Brazil) BRA	Mateus Caramelo	15	0	6+2	0	0+4	0	1+2	0	0+0	0
18	DF	(Brazil) BRA	Breno	2	0	1+0	0	1+0	0	0+0	0	0+0	0
19	DF	(Serbia) SRB	Lyanco	1	0	0+0	0	0+0	0	1+0	0	0+0	0
20	FW	(Argentina) ARG	Ricardo Centurión	29	2	7+3	0	7+2	2	9+1	0	0+0	0
21	DF	(Chile) CHI	Eugenio Mena	24	0	10+0	0	14+0	0	0+0	0	0+0	0
22	GK	(Brazil) BRA	Renan Ribeiro	2	0	0+0	0	1+0	0	1+0	0	0+0	0
23	MF	(Brazil) BRA	Thiago Mendes	37	2	13+1	1	12+2	1	8+1	0	0+0	0
24	GK	(Brazil) BRA	Léo	0	0	0+0	0	0+0	0	0+0	0	0+0	0
25	MF	(Brazil) BRA	Hudson	29	1	12+1	1	13+1	0	1+1	0	0+0	0
26	DF	(Brazil) BRA	Auro Jr.	5	0	0+0	0	0+0	0	4+1	0	0+0	0
27	DF	(Brazil) BRA	Maicon	28	3	9+0	1	9+0	1	10+0	1	0+0	0
28	DF	(Brazil) BRA	Matheus Reis	13	0	0+0	0	0+1	0	11+1	0	0+0	0
29	MF	(Brazil) BRA	Lucas Fernandes	13	1	1+5	0	0+2	0	2+3	1	0+0	0
30	FW	(Brazil) BRA	Kelvin	23	2	1+5	1	7+1	1	7+2	0	0+0	0
31	FW	(Brazil) BRA	Luiz Araújo	5	0	0+0	0	0+1	0	1+3	0	0+0	0
32	MF	(Brazil) BRA	Matheus Banguelê	1	0	0+0	0	0+0	0	1+0	0	0+0	0
33	MF	(Brazil) BRA	Artur	2	0	0+0	0	0+0	0	2+0	0	0+0	0
37	FW	(Brazil) BRA	Ytalo	10	1	0+0	0	1+0	0	5+4	1	0+0	0
Players who are on loan/left São Paulo this season:
9	FW	(Brazil) BRA	Kieza	2	0	1+0	0	0+1	0	0+0	0	0+0	0
10	MF	(Brazil) BRA	Paulo Henrique Ganso	32	7	10+4	4	10+1	2	5+2	1	0+0	0
12	FW	(Argentina) ARG	Jonathan Calleri	30	16	12+2	4	10+2	9	4+0	3	0+0	0
13	FW	(Colombia) COL	Wilder Guisao	3	0	1+0	0	0+1	0	1+0	0	0+0	0
14	FW	(Brazil) BRA	Alan Kardec	33	2	4+8	1	3+8	0	7+3	1	0+0	0
16	DF	(Brazil) BRA	Reinaldo	0	0	0+0	0	0+0	0	0+0	0	0+0	0
17	FW	(Brazil) BRA	Rogério	18	3	4+6	1	0+3	1	0+5	1	0+0	0

=== Top scorers ===
Rank	Nat	Pos	Player	Campeonato Paulista	Copa Libertadores	Campeonato Brasileiro	Copa do Brasil	Total
1	(Argentina)	FW	Jonathan Calleri	4	9	3	0	16
2	(Argentina)	FW	Andrés Chávez	0	0	6	1	7
=	(Peru)	MF	Christian Cueva	0	0	7	0	7
=	(Brazil)	MF	Paulo Henrique Ganso	4	2	1	0	7
3	(Brazil)	MF	Michel Bastos	2	3	0	0	5
4	(Brazil)	FW	Alan Kardec	1	0	3	0	4
=	(Brazil)	DF	Rodrigo Caio	2	0	1	1	4
=	(Brazil)	MF	Thiago Mendes	1	1	2	0	4
5	(Brazil)	FW	Kelvin	1	1	1	0	3
=	(Brazil)	DF	Maicon	1	1	1	0	3
=	(Brazil)	FW	Rogério	1	1	1	0	3
6	(Brazil)	FW	David Neres	0	0	2	0	2
=	(Uruguay)	DF	Diego Lugano	0	0	2	0	2
=	(Brazil)	MF	João Schmidt	0	1	1	0	2
=	(Argentina)	FW	Ricardo Centurión	0	2	0	0	2
7	(Brazil)	MF	Hudson	1	0	0	0	1
=	(Brazil)	MF	Lucas Fernandes	0	0	1	0	1
=	(Brazil)	FW	Luiz Araújo	0	0	1	0	1
=	(Serbia)	DF	Lyanco	0	0	1	0	1
=	(Brazil)	MF	Wesley	0	0	1	0	1
=	(Brazil)	FW	Ytalo	0	0	1	0	1
Total				18	21	36	2	77

=== Disciplinary record ===
Pos	Nat	No.	Player	Campeonato Paulista			Copa Libertadores			Campeonato Brasileiro			Copa do Brasil			Total		
Pos	Nat	No.	Player	Booked	Double yellow card	Sent off (straight red)	Booked	Double yellow card	Sent off (straight red)	Booked	Double yellow card	Sent off (straight red)	Booked	Double yellow card	Sent off (straight red)	Booked	Double yellow card	Sent off (straight red)
GK	(Brazil)	1	Denis	0	0	0	0	1	0	0	0	0	0	0	0	0	1	0
DF	(Brazil)	2	Bruno	4	0	0	3	0	0	1	0	0	0	0	0	8	0	0
DF	(Brazil)	3	Rodrigo Caio	0	0	0	2	0	0	0	0	0	0	0	0	2	0	0
DF	(Brazil)	4	Lucão	2	0	0	0	0	0	0	0	0	0	0	0	2	0	0
DF	(Uruguay)	5	Diego Lugano	2	0	0	1	0	0	3	1	0	0	0	0	6	1	0
DF	(Brazil)	6	Carlinhos	1	0	0	1	0	0	1	0	0	0	0	0	3	0	0
MF	(Brazil)	7	Michel Bastos	2	0	0	2	0	0	1	0	0	0	0	0	5	0	0
MF	(Brazil)	8	Daniel	0	0	0	0	0	0	0	0	0	0	0	0	0	0	0
MF	(Brazil)	10	Paulo Henrique Ganso	4	0	0	2	0	0	2	0	0	0	0	0	8	0	0
MF	(Brazil)	11	Wesley	0	0	0	1	0	0	1	0	0	0	0	0	2	0	0
FW	(Argentina)	12	Jonathan Calleri	3	0	0	5	0	1	3	1	0	0	0	0	11	1	1
MF	(Peru)	13	Christian Cueva	0	0	0	0	0	0	1	0	0	0	0	0	1	0	0
FW	(Brazil)	14	Alan Kardec	4	0	0	1	0	0	1	0	0	0	0	0	6	0	0
MF	(Brazil)	15	João Schmidt	1	0	0	0	1	0	0	0	0	0	0	0	1	1	0
DF	(Brazil)	16	Mateus Caramelo	2	0	0	2	0	0	1	0	0	0	0	0	5	0	0
DF	(Brazil)	18	Breno	1	0	0	0	0	0	0	0	0	0	0	0	1	0	0
DF	(Serbia)	19	Lyanco	0	0	0	0	0	0	0	0	0	0	0	0	0	0	0
FW	(Argentina)	20	Ricardo Centurión	0	0	0	1	0	1	0	0	0	0	0	0	1	0	1
DF	(Chile)	21	Eugenio Mena	3	0	0	2	0	0	0	0	0	0	0	0	5	0	0
GK	(Brazil)	22	Renan Ribeiro	0	0	0	0	0	0	0	0	0	0	0	0	0	0	0
MF	(Brazil)	23	Thiago Mendes	2	1	0	1	0	0	3	0	0	0	0	0	6	1	0
GK	(Brazil)	24	Léo	0	0	0	0	0	0	0	0	0	0	0	0	0	0	0
MF	(Brazil)	25	Hudson	3	0	0	2	0	0	2	0	0	0	0	0	7	0	0
DF	(Brazil)	26	Auro Jr.	0	0	0	0	0	0	0	0	0	0	0	0	0	0	0
DF	(Brazil)	27	Maicon	2	0	0	3	0	0	2	0	0	0	0	0	7	0	0
DF	(Brazil)	28	Matheus Reis	0	0	0	0	0	0	1	0	0	0	0	0	1	0	0
MF	(Brazil)	29	Lucas Fernandes	3	0	0	0	0	0	1	0	0	0	0	0	4	0	0
FW	(Brazil)	30	Kelvin	0	0	0	2	0	0	1	0	0	0	0	0	3	0	0
FW	(Brazil)	31	Luiz Araújo	0	0	0	0	0	0	0	0	0	0	0	0	0	0	0
MF	(Brazil)	32	Matheus Banguelê	0	0	0	0	0	0	1	0	0	0	0	0	1	0	0
MF	(Brazil)	33	Artur	0	0	0	0	0	0	0	0	0	0	0	0	0	0	0
FW	(Brazil)	37	Ytalo	0	0	0	0	0	0	0	0	0	0	0	0	0	0	0
Players who are on loan/left São Paulo this season:
FW	(Brazil)	9	Kieza	0	0	0	0	0	0	0	0	0	0	0	0	0	0	0
FW	(Colombia)	13	Wilder Guisao	1	0	0	0	0	0	1	0	0	0	0	0	2	0	0
DF	(Brazil)	16	Reinaldo	0	0	0	0	0	0	0	0	0	0	0	0	0	0	0
FW	(Brazil)	17	Rogério	0	0	0	0	0	0	0	0	0	0	0	0	0	0	0
TOTAL				40	1	0	31	2	2	27	2	0	0	0	0	98	5	2

Source: Competitive matches
Ordered by (red card) , (second yellow card) and (yellow card)
(yellow card) = Number of bookings; (second yellow card) = Number of sending offs after a second yellow card; (red card) = Number of sending offs by a direct red card.

=== Clean sheets ===
Includes all competitive matches. The list is sorted by shirt number when total clean sheets are equal.

Last updated on 6 November

Rank.	Pos.	No.	Player	Campeonato Paulista	Copa Libertadores	Campeonato Brasileiro	Copa do Brasil	Total
1	GK	1	(Brazil) Denis	5	3	10	1	19
2	GK	22	(Brazil) Renan Ribeiro	0	1	1	0	2
TOTAL				5	4	11	1	21

=== Managers performance ===
Name	Nationality	From	To	P	W	D	L	GF	GA	%
Edgardo Bauza	Argentina	30 January	24 July	46	17	12	17	55	48	46%
André Jardine (caretaker)	Brazil	7 August	14 August	2	1	0	1	2	2	50%
Ricardo Gomes	Brazil	16 August	20 November	19	6	5	7	18	16	40%
Pintado (caretaker)	Brazil	27 November	11 December	2	2	0	0	7	1	100%

=== Overview ===
Games played	70 (16 Campeonato Paulista, 14 Copa Libertadores, 38 Campeonato Brasileiro, 2 Copa do Brasil)
Games won	26 (6 Campeonato Paulista, 5 Copa Libertadores, 14 Campeonato Brasileiro, 1 Copa do Brasil)
Games drawn	18 (4 Campeonato Paulista, 4 Copa Libertadores, 10 Campeonato Brasileiro, 0 Copa do Brasil)
Games lost	26 (6 Campeonato Paulista, 5 Copa Libertadores, 14 Campeonato Brasileiro, 1 Copa do Brasil)
Goals scored	85
Goals conceded	71
Goal difference	+14
Clean sheets	22
Worst discipline	Diego Lugano (14 (yellow card) , 2 (red card) )
Best result	6–0 (H) v Trujillanos – Copa Libertadores
Worst result	1–4 (A) v Audax – Campeonato Paulista
Most appearances	Denis (68)
Top scorer	Jonathan Calleri (16)

Source: Competitions

== Friendlies ==
20 January International	Cerro Porteño (Paraguay)	0–1	(Brazil) São Paulo	Asunción
21:00 UTC−02:00		Report	Thiago Mendes 46'	Stadium: Estadio de los Defensores del Chaco; Attendance: 16,000; Referee: Ulises Mereles

== Competitions ==
=== Campeonato Paulista ===
==== Results summary ====
Overall								Home						Away					
Pld	W	D	L	GF	GA	GD	Pts	W	D	L	GF	GA	GD	W	D	L	GF	GA	GD
16	6	4	6	18	18	0	22	6	0	2	13	6	+7	0	4	4	5	12	−7

Group C

Pos	Team	Pld	W	D	L	GF	GA	GD	Pts	Qualification or relegation
1	Audax (Q)	15	7	3	5	24	21	+3	24	Advance to the quarter-finals
2	São Paulo (Q)	15	6	4	5	17	14	+3	22	Advance to the quarter-finals
3	Ferroviária (E)	15	5	2	8	19	21	−2	17	
4	XV de Piracicaba (R)	15	3	6	6	12	19	−7	15	Relegated
5	Capivariano (R)	15	2	4	9	14	29	−15	10	Relegated

(E) Eliminated; (Q) Qualified for the phase indicated; (R) Relegated

==== First stage ====
31 January 1	Red Bull Brasil	1–1	São Paulo	Campinas
19:30 UTC−02:00	Roger 71' (pen.)	Report	Ganso 43'	Stadium: Estádio Moisés Lucarelli (Majestoso); Attendance: 5,606; Referee: Marcelo Rogério

6 February 2	São Paulo	4–0	Água Santa	São Paulo
17:00 UTC−02:00	Calleri 32', 71'; Thiago Mendes 78'; Michel Bastos 89'	Report		Stadium: Estádio Municipal Paulo Machado de Carvalho (Pacaembu); Attendance: 7,243; Referee: Vinicius Furlan

14 February 4	Corinthians	2–0	São Paulo	São Paulo
17:00 UTC−02:00	Lucca 23'; Yago 85'	Report		Stadium: Arena Corinthians; Attendance: 36,378; Referee: Luiz Flavio de Oliveira

21 February 5	São Paulo	1–0	Rio Claro	São Paulo
17:00 UTC−03:00	Rodrigo Caio 50'	Report		Stadium: Estádio Municipal Paulo Machado de Carvalho (Pacaembu); Attendance: 7,666; Referee: José Cláudio Rocha Filho

24 February 6	São Paulo	2–0	Novorizontino	São Paulo
19:30 UTC−03:00	Michel Bastos 19' (pen.); Rodrigo Caio 81'	Report		Stadium: Estádio Municipal Paulo Machado de Carvalho (Pacaembu); Attendance: 3,333; Referee: Adriano de Assis Miranda

27 February 7	Ponte Preta	1–0	São Paulo	Campinas
19:30 UTC−03:00	Reinaldo 42'	Report		Stadium: Estádio Moisés Lucarelli (Majestoso); Attendance: 5,288; Referee: Flávio Rodrigues de Souza

1 March 3	São Paulo	2–0	Mogi Mirim	São Paulo
20:30 UTC−03:00	Rogério 35'; Ganso 89'	Report		Stadium: Estádio Municipal Paulo Machado de Carvalho (Pacaembu); Attendance: 3,013; Referee: Salim Fende Chavez

5 March 8	São Paulo	1–3	São Bernardo	São Paulo
16:00 UTC−03:00	Ganso 30'	Report	Tata 68'; Jean Carlos 76'; Bruno 90+1' (o.g.)	Stadium: Estádio Municipal Paulo Machado de Carvalho (Pacaembu); Attendance: 12,371; Referee: Rodrigo Guarizo Ferreira do Amaral

13 March 9	São Paulo	0–2	Palmeiras	São Paulo
11:00 UTC−03:00		Report	Dudu 74'; Robinho 85'	Stadium: Estádio Municipal Paulo Machado de Carvalho (Pacaembu); Attendance: 13,852; Referee: Raphael Claus

20 March 10	Ituano	1–1	São Paulo	Itu
16:00 UTC−03:00	Ganso 61'	Report	Léo 89'	Stadium: Estádio Novelli Júnior; Attendance: 7,885; Referee: Flávio Rodrigues de Souza

23 March 11	São Paulo	1–0	Botafogo	São Paulo
21:45 UTC−03:00	Calleri 89'	Report		Stadium: Estádio Municipal Paulo Machado de Carvalho (Pacaembu); Attendance: 3,118; Referee: Rafael Gomes Félix da Silva

27 March 12	Santos	1–1	São Paulo	Santos
18:30 UTC−03:00	Joel 59'	Report	Alan Kardec 82'	Stadium: Estádio Urbano Caldeira (Vila Belmiro); Attendance: 6,239; Referee: Marcelo Aparecido Ribeiro de Souza

30 March 13	Linense	1–1	São Paulo	São José do Rio Preto
19:30 UTC−03:00	Zé Antônio 85'	Report	Kelvin 90+2'	Stadium: Estádio Anísio Haddad (Rio Pretão); Attendance: 10,510; Referee: Vinícius Gonçalves Dias Araújo

2 April 14	São Paulo	2–1	Oeste	São Paulo
18:30 UTC−03:00	Hudson 55'; Maicon 90'	Report	Cristiano 43'	Stadium: Estádio Cícero Pompeu de Toledo (Morumbi); Attendance: 10,052; Referee: Raphael Claus

10 April 15	São Bento	1–0	São Paulo	Sorocaba
16:00 UTC−03:00	Régis Souza 55'	Report		Stadium: Estádio Municipal Walter Ribeiro; Attendance: 7,681; Referee: Rodrigo Guarizo Ferreira do Amaral

==== Knockout stage ====
17 April Quarterfinal	Audax	4–1	São Paulo	Osasco
18:30 UTC−03:00	Ytalo 26', 41'; Mike 50'; Juninho 69'	Report	Calleri 33'	Stadium: Estádio Municipal Prefeito José Liberatti (Rochdalão); Attendance: 7,921; Referee: José Cláudio Rocha Filho

=== Copa Libertadores ===
==== Results summary ====
Overall								Home						Away					
Pld	W	D	L	GF	GA	GD	Pts	W	D	L	GF	GA	GD	W	D	L	GF	GA	GD
14	5	4	5	21	15	+6	19	5	0	2	14	4	+10	0	4	3	7	11	−4

==== First stage ====
3 February First leg	Universidad César Vallejo (Peru)	1–1	(Brazil) São Paulo	Trujillo
21:45 UTC−02:00	Hohberg 19'	Report	Calleri 65'	Stadium: Estadio Mansiche; Referee: Roddy Zambrano (Ecuador)

10 February Second leg	São Paulo (Brazil)	1–0 (2–1 agg.)	(Peru) Universidad César Vallejo	São Paulo
21:45 UTC−02:00	Rogério 87'	Report		Stadium: Estádio Municipal Paulo Machado de Carvalho (Pacaembu); Attendance: 32,657; Referee: Christian Ferreyra (Uruguay)

==== Group stage ====
Pos	Team	Pld	W	D	L	GF	GA	GD	Pts	Qualification
1	(Argentina) River Plate (A)	6	3	2	1	17	7	+10	11	Final stages
2	(Brazil) São Paulo (A)	6	2	3	1	11	5	+6	9	Final stages
3	(Bolivia) The Strongest	6	2	2	2	6	11	−5	8	
4	(Venezuela) Trujillanos	6	1	1	4	7	18	−11	4	

Source: CONMEBOL
Rules for classification: 1) points; 2) goal difference; 3) goals scored; 4) away goals scored; 5) drawing of lots.
(A) Advanced to the round of 16

17 February 1	São Paulo (Brazil)	0–1	(Bolivia) The Strongest	São Paulo
19:30 UTC−02:00		Report	Alonso 62'	Stadium: Estádio Municipal Paulo Machado de Carvalho (Pacaembu); Attendance: 26,467; Referee: Mario Díaz de Vivar (Paraguay)

10 March 2	River Plate (Argentina)	1–1	(Brazil) São Paulo	Buenos Aires
19:30 UTC−03:00	Thiago Mendes 31' (o.g.)	Report	Ganso 16'	Stadium: Estadio Antonio Vespucio Liberti (Monumental); Referee: Julio Bascuñán (Chile)

16 March 3	Trujillanos (Venezuela)	1–1	(Brazil) São Paulo	Valera
19:30 UTC−03:00	Rojas 35'	Report	Ganso 37'	Stadium: Estadio José Alberto Pérez; Referee: Wilson Lamouroux (Colombia)

5 April 4	São Paulo (Brazil)	6–0	(Venezuela) Trujillanos	São Paulo
21:45 UTC−03:00	Calleri 12', 49' (pen.), 79', 86'; Kelvin 18'; João Schmidt 24'	Report		Stadium: Estádio Cícero Pompeu de Toledo (Morumbi); Attendance: 18,561; Referee: Ulises Mereles (Paraguay)

13 April 5	São Paulo (Brazil)	2–1	(Argentina) River Plate	São Paulo
21:45 UTC−03:00	Calleri 28', 59'	Report	Alonso 82'	Stadium: Estádio Cícero Pompeu de Toledo (Morumbi); Attendance: 51,342; Referee: Andrés Cunha (Uruguay)

21 April 6	The Strongest (Bolivia)	1–1	(Brazil) São Paulo	La Paz
21:45 UTC−03:00	Cristaldo 28'	Report	Calleri 43'	Stadium: Estadio Hernando Siles; Referee: Roberto Tobar (Chile)

==== Knockout stage ====
===== Round of 16 =====
28 April First leg	São Paulo (Brazil)	4–0	(Mexico) Toluca	São Paulo
21:45 UTC−03:00	Michel Bastos 26'; Centurión 44', 60'; Thiago Mendes 52'	Report		Stadium: Estádio Cícero Pompeu de Toledo (Morumbi); Attendance: 53,241; Referee: Jonhatan Fuentes (Uruguay)

4 May Second leg	Toluca (Mexico)	3–1 (3–5 agg.)	(Brazil) São Paulo	Toluca
19:15 UTC−03:00	Uribe 17', 86'; Triverio 60'	Report	Michel Bastos 50'	Stadium: Estadio Nemesio Díez; Referee: Wilson Lamouroux (Colombia)

===== Quarterfinals =====
11 May First leg	São Paulo (Brazil)	1–0	(Brazil) Atlético Mineiro	São Paulo
21:45 UTC−03:00	Michel Bastos 78'	Report		Stadium: Estádio Cícero Pompeu de Toledo (Morumbi); Attendance: 61,297; Referee: Wilmar Roldán (Colombia)

18 May Second leg	Atlético Mineiro (Brazil)	2–1 (2–2 (a) agg.)	(Brazil) São Paulo	Belo Horizonte
21:45 UTC−03:00	Cazares 6'; Carlos 11'	Report	Maicon 14'	Stadium: Estádio Raimundo Sampaio (Independência); Attendance: 21,337; Referee: Andrés Cunha (Uruguay)

===== Semifinals =====
6 July First leg	São Paulo (Brazil)	0–2	(Colombia) Atlético Nacional	São Paulo
21:45 UTC−03:00		Report	Borja 81', 87'	Stadium: Estádio Cícero Pompeu de Toledo (Morumbi); Attendance: 61,766; Referee: Mauro Vigliano (Argentina)

13 July Second leg	Atlético Nacional (Colombia)	2–1 (4–1 agg.)	(Brazil) São Paulo	Medellín
21:45 UTC−03:00	Borja 15', 77' (pen.)	Report	Calleri 8'	Stadium: Estadio Atanasio Girardot; Referee: Patricio Polic (Chile)

=== Campeonato Brasileiro ===
==== Results summary ====
Overall								Home						Away					
Pld	W	D	L	GF	GA	GD	Pts	W	D	L	GF	GA	GD	W	D	L	GF	GA	GD
38	14	10	14	44	36	+8	52	9	5	5	29	13	+16	5	5	9	15	23	−8

==== Results by round ====
Round	1	2	3	4	5	6	7	8	9	10	11	12	13	14	15	16	17	18	19	20	21	22	23	24	25	26	27	28	29	30	31	32	33	34	35	36	37	38
Ground	A	H	A	H	A	A	H	H	A	H	A	H	A	H	A	A	H	H	A	H	A	H	A	H	H	A	A	H	A	H	A	H	A	H	H	A	A	H
Result	W	L	D	W	L	W	L	W	D	D	L	W	L	W	D	L	D	L	W	L	D	D	L	W	W	L	L	D	D	L	W	W	L	W	D	L	W	W
Position	7	11	10	6	9	6	7	6	5	7	10	8	10	8	9	9	10	11	10	12	12	12	14	12	12	12	12	14	14	14	12	11	12	12	13	13	11	10

Source: São Paulo FC.net
A = Away; H = Home; W = Win; D = Draw; L = Loss

==== Matches ====
15 May 1	Botafogo	0–1	São Paulo	Volta Redonda
11:00 UTC−03:00		Report	Lucas Fernandes 21'	Stadium: Estádio General Sylvio Raulino de Oliveira (Da Cidadania); Attendance: 5,465; Referee: Bráulio da Silva Machado

22 May 2	São Paulo	1–2	Internacional	São Paulo
16:00 UTC−03:00	Lugano 86'	Report	Sasha 35', 88'	Stadium: Estádio Cícero Pompeu de Toledo (Morumbi); Attendance: 19,509; Referee: Péricles Bassols Pegado Cortez

25 May 3	Coritiba	1–1	São Paulo	Curitiba
21:45 UTC−03:00	Alan Santos 63'	Report	Rogério 79'	Stadium: Estádio Major Antônio Couto Pereira; Attendance: 9,979; Referee: Marielson Alves Silva

29 May 4	São Paulo	1–0	Palmeiras	São Paulo
16:00 UTC−02:00	Ganso 11'	Report		Stadium: Estádio Cícero Pompeu de Toledo (Morumbi); Attendance: 21,016; Referee: Ricardo Marques Ribeiro

1 June 5	Figueirense	1–0	São Paulo	Florianópolis
21:45 UTC−03:00	Rafael Moura 15'	Report		Stadium: Estádio Orlando Scarpelli; Attendance: 5,271; Referee: Jean Pierre Gonçalves Lima

5 June 6	Cruzeiro	0–1	São Paulo	Belo Horizonte
18:30 UTC−03:00		Report	Ytalo 22'	Stadium: Estádio Governador Magalhães Pinto (Mineirão); Attendance: 18,880; Referee: André Luiz de Freitas Castro

11 June 7	São Paulo	1–2	Atlético Paranaense	São Paulo
21:00 UTC−03:00	Maicon 41'	Report	Otávio 65'; Hernani 87'	Stadium: Estádio Cícero Pompeu de Toledo (Morumbi); Attendance: 12,389; Referee: Anderson Daronco

15 June 8	São Paulo	2–0	Vitória	São Paulo
19:30 UTC−03:00	Calleri 75'; Lugano 86'	Report		Stadium: Estádio Cícero Pompeu de Toledo (Morumbi); Attendance: 9,213; Referee: Wagner Reway

19 June 9	Flamengo	2–2	São Paulo	Brasília
16:00 UTC−03:00	Rodrigo Caio 22' (o.g.); Willian Arão 58'	Report	Calleri 11', 51'	Stadium: Estádio Nacional Mané Garrincha; Attendance: 27,233; Referee: Elmo Alves Resende Cunha

23 June 10	São Paulo	0–0	Sport	São Paulo
21:00 UTC−03:00		Report		Stadium: Estádio Cícero Pompeu de Toledo (Morumbi); Attendance: 11,145; Referee: Rafael Traci

26 June 11	Santos	3–0	São Paulo	São Paulo
16:00 UTC−03:00	Vitor Bueno 1'; Rodrigão 39'; Lucas Lima 90'	Report		Stadium: Estádio Municipal Paulo Machado de Carvalho (Pacaembu); Attendance: 24,830; Referee: Raphael Claus

29 June 12	São Paulo	2–1	Fluminense	São Paulo
21:45 UTC−03:00	João Schmidt 1'; Alan Kardec 39'	Report	Cícero 52' (pen.)	Stadium: Estádio Cícero Pompeu de Toledo (Morumbi); Attendance: 10,323; Referee: Anderson Daronco

3 July 13	Ponte Preta	1–0	São Paulo	Campinas
16:30 UTC−03:00	Clayson 56'	Report		Stadium: Estádio Moisés Lucarelli (Majestoso); Attendance: 5,551; Referee: Vinicius Furlan

10 July 14	São Paulo	3–0	América-MG	São Paulo
16:00 UTC−03:00	Alan Kardec 33', 59'; Lyanco 42'	Report		Stadium: Estádio Cícero Pompeu de Toledo (Morumbi); Attendance: 8,198; Referee: Dewson Fernando Freitas da Silva

17 July 15	Corinthians	1–1	São Paulo	São Paulo
16:00 UTC−03:00	Bruno Henrique 21'	Report	Cueva 15' (pen.)	Stadium: Arena Corinthians; Attendance: 42,099; Referee: Péricles Bassols

24 July 16	Grêmio	1–0	São Paulo	Porto Alegre
16:00 UTC−03:00	Douglas 52'	Report		Stadium: Arena do Grêmio; Attendance: 37,069; Referee: Heber Roberto Lopes

31 July 17	São Paulo	2–2	Chapecoense	São Paulo
11:00 UTC−03:00	Cueva 61', 86' (pen.)	Report	Kempes 5'; Thiego 13'	Stadium: Estádio Cícero Pompeu de Toledo (Morumbi); Attendance: 54,996; Referee: Wagner do Nascimento Magalhães

4 August 18	São Paulo	1–2	Atlético Mineiro	São Paulo
19:30 UTC−03:00	Chávez 4'	Report	Maicosuel 12'; Pratto 21'	Stadium: Estádio Cícero Pompeu de Toledo (Morumbi); Attendance: 15,717; Referee: Leandro Vuaden

7 August 19	Santa Cruz	1–2	São Paulo	Recife
16:15 UTC−03:00	Keno 84'	Report	Chávez 39', 65'	Stadium: Estádio José do Rego Maciel (Arruda); Attendance: 12,552; Referee: Bruno Arleu de Araujo

14 August 20	São Paulo	0–1	Botafogo	São Paulo
16:15 UTC−03:00		Report	Sassá 90+2'	Stadium: Estádio Cícero Pompeu de Toledo (Morumbi); Attendance: 14,399; Referee: Caio Max Augusto Vieira

21 August 21	Internacional	1–1	São Paulo	Porto Alegre
16:00 UTC−03:00	Ernando 85'	Report	Cueva 36' (pen.)	Stadium: Estádio José Pinheiro Borda (Beira-Rio); Attendance: 26,130; Referee: Gilberto Rodrigues Junior

28 August 22	São Paulo	0–0	Coritiba	São Paulo
16:00 UTC−03:00		Report		Stadium: Estádio Cícero Pompeu de Toledo (Morumbi); Attendance: 7,836; Referee: Francisco Carlos do Nascimento

7 September 23	Palmeiras	2–1	São Paulo	São Paulo
21:45 UTC−03:00	Vitor Hugo 55'; Mina 70'	Report	Chávez 47'	Stadium: Allianz Parque; Attendance: 39,944; Referee: Sandro Meira Ricci

11 September 24	São Paulo	3–1	Figueirense	São Paulo
11:00 UTC−03:00	Chávez 30'; Cueva 65'; Kelvin 62'	Report	Carlos Alberto 87' (pen.)	Stadium: Estádio Cícero Pompeu de Toledo (Morumbi); Attendance: 27,365; Referee: Dewson Fernando Freitas da Silva

15 September 25	São Paulo	1–0	Cruzeiro	São Paulo
21:00 UTC−03:00	Wesley 42'	Report		Stadium: Estádio Cícero Pompeu de Toledo (Morumbi); Attendance: 15,566; Referee: Diego Almeida Real

18 September 26	Atlético Paranaense	1–0	São Paulo	Curitiba
16:00 UTC−03:00	Pablo 79'	Report		Stadium: Arena Joaquim Américo Guimarães (Arena da Baixada); Attendance: 17,614; Referee: Anderson Daronco

25 September 27	Vitória	2–0	São Paulo	Salvador
16:00 UTC−03:00	Marinho 52'; Lyanco 71' (o.g.)	Report		Stadium: Estádio Manoel Barradas (Barradão); Attendance: 11,384; Referee: Francisco Carlos do Nascimento

1 October 28	São Paulo	0–0	Flamengo	São Paulo
16:00 UTC−03:00		Report		Stadium: Estádio Cícero Pompeu de Toledo (Morumbi); Attendance: 29,813; Referee: Sandro Meira Ricci

5 October 29	Sport	1–1	São Paulo	Recife
21:45 UTC−03:00	Diego Souza 42'	Report	Thiago Mendes 25'	Stadium: Estádio Adelmar da Costa Carvalho (Ilha do Retiro); Attendance: 11,424; Referee: Rafael Traci

13 October 30	São Paulo	0–1	Santos	São Paulo
21:00 UTC−03:00		Report	Copete 46'	Stadium: Estádio Municipal Paulo Machado de Carvalho (Pacaembu); Attendance: 28,321; Referee: Anderson Daronco

17 October 31	Fluminense	1–2	São Paulo	Rio de Janeiro
20:00 UTC−02:00	Wellington 30' (pen.)	Report	Thiago Mendes 71'; Rodrigo Caio 81'	Stadium: Estádio Giulite Coutinho (Édson Passos); Attendance: 7,824; Referee: Nielson Nogueira Dias

22 October 32	São Paulo	2–0	Ponte Preta	São Paulo
17:00 UTC−02:00	Cueva 11' (pen.); David Neres 81'	Report		Stadium: Estádio Cícero Pompeu de Toledo (Morumbi); Attendance: 49,673; Referee: Marcelo de Lima Henrique

31 October 33	América-MG	1–0	São Paulo	Belo Horizonte
20:00 UTC−02:00	Michael 26'	Report		Stadium: Estádio Raimundo Sampaio (Independência); Attendance: 5,014; Referee: João Batista de Arruda

5 November 34	São Paulo	4–0	Corinthians	São Paulo
19:30 UTC−02:00	Cueva 14' (pen.); David Neres 61'; Chávez 67'; Luiz Araújo 90+2'	Report		Stadium: Estádio Cícero Pompeu de Toledo (Morumbi); Attendance: 53,781; Referee: Claudio Francisco Lima e Silva

17 November 35	São Paulo	1–1	Grêmio	São Paulo
19:30 UTC−02:00	Chávez 11'	Report	Ramiro 65'	Stadium: Estádio Cícero Pompeu de Toledo (Morumbi); Attendance: 21,933; Referee: Jailson Macedo Freitas

20 November 36	Chapecoense	2–0	São Paulo	Chapecó
19:30 UTC−02:00	Dener 40'; Tiaguinho 45'	Report		Stadium: Arena Indio Condá; Attendance: 8,163; Referee: Jean Pierre Gonçalves Lima

27 November 37	Atlético Mineiro	1–2	São Paulo	Belo Horizonte
17:00 UTC−02:00	Hyuri 22'	Report	Maicon 24'; Gilberto 90'	Stadium: Estádio Raimundo Sampaio (Independência); Referee: Dewson Fernando Freitas da Silva

11 December 38	São Paulo	5–0	Santa Cruz	São Paulo
17:00 UTC−02:00	David Neres 1'; Gilberto 29'; Chávez 57', 72'; Luiz Araújo 81'	Report		Stadium: Estádio Municipal Paulo Machado de Carvalho (Pacaembu); Attendance: 16,553; Referee: Paulo Schleich Volkopff

=== Copa do Brasil ===
==== Results summary ====
Overall								Home						Away					
Pld	W	D	L	GF	GA	GD	Pts	W	D	L	GF	GA	GD	W	D	L	GF	GA	GD
2	1	0	1	2	2	0	3	0	0	1	1	2	−1	1	0	0	1	0	+1

==== Round of 16 ====
24 August First leg	São Paulo	1–2	Juventude	São Paulo
21:45 UTC−03:00	Chávez 39'	Report	Roberson 9', 73' (pen.)	Stadium: Estádio Cícero Pompeu de Toledo (Morumbi); Attendance: 6,643; Referee: Wilton Pereira Sampaio

22 September Second leg	Juventude	0–1 (2–2 (a) agg.)	São Paulo	Caxias do Sul
21:30 UTC−03:00		Report	Rodrigo Caio 68'	Stadium: Estádio Alfredo Jaconi; Referee: Ricardo Marques Ribeiro
