= 2015 São Paulo FC season =

São Paulo
2015 season
- Chairman: Carlos Miguel Aidar (Resigned on 13 October); Carlos Augusto de Barros e Silva (Elected on 27 October)
- Manager: Muricy Ramalho (until 6 April); Milton Cruz (caretaker manager); Juan Carlos Osorio (from 26 May to 7 October) (Brazil) Doriva (from 7 October to 9 November); Milton Cruz (caretaker manager)
- Stadium: Estádio do Morumbi
- Série A: 4th
- Campeonato Paulista: Semi-finals
- Copa Libertadores: Round of 16
- Copa do Brasil: Semi-finals
- Top goalscorer: League: Alexandre Pato (10 goals); All: Alexandre Pato (26 goals)
- Highest home attendance: 66,369 (v Cruzeiro in Copa Libertadores)
- Lowest home attendance: 4,507 (v São Bento in Campeonato Paulista)
Home colours	Away colours	Third colours

The 2015 season was São Paulo's 86th year since the club's existence. At the first half of the year, São Paulo played the Campeonato Paulista and Copa Libertadores. In the state league the club's performance led to semifinals when The Dearest lose to rival Santos in a single match on away field (1–2). By the continental tournament, Tricolor reach the round of 16 being beaten by Cruzeiro in penalty shootouts by 3–4 after two equal scores (1–0 home; 0–1 away). In April, Muricy Ramalho left the São Paulo FC due to health problems and the team was trained by assistant coach Milton Cruz during a few matches and managed by Colombian Juan Carlos Osorio and Brazilian Doriva in the course of the season. After only 7 matches Doriva was replaced by Milton Cruz who trained the club again at the end of the year. In the Copa do Brasil, Tricolor was defeated by Santos in semifinals with two losses by 1–3, 2–6 on aggregate score. By national league a final 4th position take a place in the first stage of the Copa Libertadores. The main event of the year was the retirement of goalkeeper Rogério Ceni in a symbolical match between the world champions players by São Paulo in 1992 and 2005. The final result was 5–3 to 2005 champions. Rogério Ceni stopped his career at 42 with a record of 1237 matches, 131 goals during his 23 seasons by Tricolor.

== Players ==
Note: Flags indicate national team as defined under FIFA eligibility rules; some limited exceptions apply. Players may hold more than one non-FIFA nationality.

No.	Pos.	Nation	Player
01	GK	BRA	Rogério Ceni (captain)
3	DF	BRA	Rodrigo Caio
4	DF	BRA	Matheus Reis
6	DF	BRA	Carlinhos
7	MF	BRA	Michel Bastos
9	FW	BRA	Luís Fabiano (vice-captain)
10	MF	BRA	Paulo Henrique Ganso
11	FW	BRA	Alexandre Pato (on loan from Corinthians)
12	GK	BRA	Denis
13	FW	COL	Wilder Guisao (on loan from Toluca)
14	FW	BRA	Alan Kardec
16	DF	BRA	Reinaldo
17	FW	BRA	Rogério
19	MF	BRA	Wesley
20	FW	ARG	Ricardo Centurión
21	DF	BRA	Edson Silva

No.	Pos.	Nation	Player
22	DF	BRA	Bruno
23	MF	BRA	Thiago Mendes
25	MF	BRA	Hudson
26	DF	BRA	Luiz Eduardo
27	DF	BRA	Auro Jr.
28	GK	BRA	Renan Ribeiro
29	MF	BRA	Daniel
30	DF	BRA	Lucão
33	DF	BRA	Breno
34	DF	BRA	Lyanco
36	MF	BRA	João Schmidt
37	FW	BRA	João Paulo
38	MF	BRA	Jéferson
39	FW	BRA	Murilo
40	GK	BRA	Léo

=== Out on loan ===
Note: Flags indicate national team as defined under FIFA eligibility rules; some limited exceptions apply. Players may hold more than one non-FIFA nationality.

No.	Pos.	Nation	Player
—	DF	BRA	João Filipe (on loan to Fluminense)
—	DF	BRA	Mateus Caramelo (on loan to Chapecoense)
—	DF	BRA	Luiz Eduardo (on loan to Rio Claro)
—	DF	BRA	Thiago Carleto (on loan to Botafogo)
—	DF	BRA	Cortez (on loan to Albirex Niigata)
—	DF	BRA	Luis Ricardo (on loan to Botafogo)
—	MF	ARG	Marcelo Cañete (on loan to São Bernardo)
19	FW	BRA	Ademilson (on loan to Yokohama F. Marinos)
18	MF	BRA	Maicon (on loan to Grêmio)
—	DF	BRA	Lucas Farias (on loan to Náutico)
—	DF	BRA	Hugo Gomes (on loan to Mallorca)
29	FW	BRA	Ewandro (on loan to Atlético Paranaense)

=== Transfers ===
==== In ====
Note: Flags indicate national team as defined under FIFA eligibility rules; some limited exceptions apply. Players may hold more than one non-FIFA nationality.

No.	Pos.	Nation	Player
16	DF	BRA	Carlinhos (from Fluminense)
22	DF	BRA	Bruno (from Fluminense)
23	MF	BRA	Thiago Mendes (from Goiás)
33	DF	BRA	Breno (Free Agent)
29	MF	BRA	Daniel (from Botafogo)
37	FW	BRA	Jonathan Cafu (from Ponte Preta)
20	FW	ARG	Ricardo Centurión (from Racing Club)
26	DF	BRA	Dória (on loan from Olympique de Marseille)
19	MF	BRA	Wesley (from Palmeiras)
36	MF	BRA	João Schmidt (return from Vitória de Setúbal)
13	FW	COL	Wilder Guisao (on loan from Toluca)
26	DF	BRA	Luiz Eduardo (from São Caetano)
17	FW	BRA	Rogério (from Náutico)

==== Out ====
Note: Flags indicate national team as defined under FIFA eligibility rules; some limited exceptions apply. Players may hold more than one non-FIFA nationality.

No.	Pos.	Nation	Player
—	MF	BRA	Kaká (return to Orlando City)
—	FW	BRA	Osvaldo (to Al-Ahli)
—	DF	URU	Álvaro Pereira (to Estudiantes de La Plata)
—	DF	ARG	Clemente Rodríguez (to Colón)
4	DF	BRA	Antônio Carlos (to Fluminense)
13	DF	BRA	Paulo Miranda (to Red Bull Salzburg)
15	MF	BRA	Denílson (to Al-Wahda)
—	MF	ARG	Marcelo Cañete (free agent)
5	MF	BRA	Souza (to Fenerbahçe)
17	FW	BRA	Jonathan Cafu (to Ludogorets)
26	DF	BRA	Dória (return to Olympique de Marseille)
8	MF	BRA	Gabriel Boschilia (to AS Monaco)
2	DF	BRA	Rafael Toloi (to Atalanta)

== Statistics ==
=== Appearances and goals ===
No.	Pos	Nat	Player	Total		Campeonato Paulista		Copa Libertadores		Campeonato Brasileiro		Copa do Brasil	
No.	Pos	Nat	Player	Apps	Goals	Apps	Goals	Apps	Goals	Apps	Goals	Apps	Goals
01	GK	(Brazil) BRA	Rogério Ceni	51	8	15+0	4	8+0	0	23+0	3	5+0	1
3	DF	(Brazil) BRA	Rodrigo Caio	36	1	2+2	0	1+2	0	23+1	1	5+0	0
4	DF	(Brazil) BRA	Matheus Reis	16	0	0+0	0	0+0	0	7+6	0	2+1	0
6	DF	(Brazil) BRA	Carlinhos	30	2	6+0	0	1+0	0	18+1	2	4+0	0
7	MF	(Brazil) BRA	Michel Bastos	55	13	11+1	3	7+0	2	30+1	7	5+0	1
9	FW	(Brazil) BRA	Luís Fabiano	39	13	5+2	3	4+2	1	18+4	8	4+0	1
10	MF	(Brazil) BRA	Paulo Henrique Ganso	53	3	8+0	1	8+0	0	29+2	2	5+1	0
11	FW	(Brazil) BRA	Alexandre Pato	59	26	12+2	8	6+0	3	29+4	10	6+0	5
12	GK	(Brazil) BRA	Denis	8	0	1+0	0	0+0	0	6+0	0	0+1	0
13	FW	(Colombia) COL	Wilder Guisao	10	1	0+0	0	0+0	0	4+2	1	2+2	0
14	FW	(Brazil) BRA	Alan Kardec	25	11	8+4	7	2+1	0	3+5	4	1+1	0
16	DF	(Brazil) BRA	Reinaldo	44	1	8+1	0	6+1	1	17+6	0	3+2	0
17	FW	(Brazil) BRA	Rogério	14	4	0+0	0	0+0	0	8+6	4	0+0	0
19	MF	(Brazil) BRA	Wesley	34	1	2+0	0	2+0	0	14+11	1	1+4	0
20	FW	(Argentina) ARG	Ricardo Centurión	46	6	8+4	1	1+5	2	10+15	2	1+2	1
21	DF	(Brazil) BRA	Edson Silva	23	0	8+3	0	0+0	0	8+4	0	0+0	0
22	DF	(Brazil) BRA	Bruno	50	0	8+0	0	6+0	0	28+2	0	5+1	0
23	MF	(Brazil) BRA	Thiago Mendes	54	2	8+3	0	0+3	0	30+5	1	5+0	1
25	MF	(Brazil) BRA	Hudson	46	1	8+2	1	3+2	0	21+8	0	0+2	0
26	DF	(Brazil) BRA	Luiz Eduardo	9	1	0+0	0	0+0	0	6+0	1	3+0	0
27	DF	(Brazil) BRA	Auro Jr.	16	0	5+1	0	0+0	0	1+9	0	0+0	0
28	GK	(Brazil) BRA	Renan Ribeiro	11	0	1+0	0	0+0	0	9+0	0	1+0	0
29	MF	(Brazil) BRA	Daniel	2	0	0+0	0	0+0	0	0+2	0	0+0	0
30	DF	(Brazil) BRA	Lucão	47	0	11+1	0	4+1	0	25+0	0	5+0	0
33	DF	(Brazil) BRA	Breno	6	1	0+0	0	0+0	0	4+1	1	1+0	0
34	DF	(Brazil) BRA	Lyanco	11	0	0+0	0	0+0	0	4+5	0	2+0	0
36	MF	(Brazil) BRA	João Schmidt	4	0	0+0	0	0+0	0	2+2	0	0+0	0
37	FW	(Brazil) BRA	João Paulo	4	0	0+0	0	0+0	0	1+3	0	0+0	0
38	MF	(Brazil) BRA	Jéferson	0	0	0+0	0	0+0	0	0+0	0	0+0	0
39	FW	(Brazil) BRA	Murilo	0	0	0+0	0	0+0	0	0+0	0	0+0	0
40	GK	(Brazil) BRA	Léo	0	0	0+0	0	0+0	0	0+0	0	0+0	0
Players who are on loan/left São Paulo this season:
2	DF	(Brazil) BRA	Rafael Toloi	31	0	10+0	0	8+0	0	12+1	0	0+0	0
4	DF	(Brazil) BRA	Antônio Carlos	0	0	0+0	0	0+0	0	0+0	0	0+0	0
5	MF	(Brazil) BRA	Souza	23	2	6+1	0	8+0	0	8+0	2	0+0	0
8	MF	(Brazil) BRA	Boschilia	16	3	4+4	2	0+2	0	2+4	1	0+0	0
13	DF	(Brazil) BRA	Paulo Miranda	11	2	5+0	1	1+0	0	4+1	1	0+0	0
15	MF	(Brazil) BRA	Denílson	22	0	11+0	0	7+0	0	4+0	0	0+0	0
17	FW	(Brazil) BRA	Jonathan Cafu	12	1	2+7	0	0+1	1	1+1	0	0+0	0
18	MF	(Brazil) BRA	Maicon	5	0	4+0	0	1+0	0	0+0	0	0+0	0
19	FW	(Brazil) BRA	Ademilson	1	0	0+1	0	0+0	0	0+0	0	0+0	0
26	DF	(Brazil) BRA	Dória	18	2	4+1	1	4+0	0	9+0	1	0+0	0
29	FW	(Brazil) BRA	Ewandro	8	1	5+2	1	0+1	0	0+0	0	0+0	0

=== Top scorers ===
Rank	Nat	Pos	Player	Campeonato Paulista	Copa Libertadores	Campeonato Brasileiro	Copa do Brasil	Total
1	(Brazil)	FW	Alexandre Pato	8	3	10	5	26
2	(Brazil)	FW	Luís Fabiano	3	1	8	1	13
=	(Brazil)	MF	Michel Bastos	3	2	7	1	13
4	(Brazil)	FW	Alan Kardec	7	0	4	0	11
5	(Brazil)	GK	Rogério Ceni	4	0	3	1	8
6	(Argentina)	FW	Centurión	1	2	2	1	6
7	(Brazil)	FW	Rogério	0	0	4	0	4
8	(Brazil)	MF	Boschilia	2	0	1	0	3
=	(Brazil)	MF	Paulo Henrique Ganso	1	0	2	0	3
10	(Brazil)	DF	Carlinhos	0	0	2	0	2
=	(Brazil)	DF	Dória	1	0	1	0	2
=	(Brazil)	DF	Paulo Miranda	1	0	1	0	2
=	(Brazil)	MF	Souza	0	0	2	0	2
=	(Brazil)	MF	Thiago Mendes	0	0	1	1	1
15	(Brazil)	DF	Breno	0	0	1	0	1
=	(Brazil)	FW	Ewandro	1	0	0	0	1
=	(Brazil)	MF	Hudson	1	0	0	0	1
=	(Brazil)	FW	Jonathan Cafu	0	1	0	0	1
=	(Brazil)	DF	Luiz Eduardo	0	0	1	0	1
=	(Brazil)	DF	Reinaldo	0	1	0	0	1
=	(Brazil)	DF	Rodrigo Caio	0	0	1	0	1
=	(Brazil)	MF	Wesley	0	0	1	0	1
=	(Colombia)	FW	Wilder Guisao	0	0	1	0	1
				1	0	0	0	1
Total				34	10	53	10	107

=== Disciplinary record ===
Pos	Nat	No.	Player	Campeonato Paulista			Copa Libertadores			Campeonato Brasileiro			Copa do Brasil			Total		
Pos	Nat	No.	Player	Booked	Double yellow card	Sent off (straight red)	Booked	Double yellow card	Sent off (straight red)	Booked	Double yellow card	Sent off (straight red)	Booked	Double yellow card	Sent off (straight red)	Booked	Double yellow card	Sent off (straight red)
GK	(Brazil)	01	Rogério Ceni	0	0	0	0	0	0	1	0	0	0	0	0	1	0	0
DF	(Brazil)	3	Rodrigo Caio	1	0	0	0	0	0	3	0	0	0	0	0	4	0	0
DF	(Brazil)	4	Matheus Reis	0	0	0	0	0	0	2	1	0	1	0	0	3	1	0
DF	(Brazil)	6	Carlinhos	0	0	0	1	0	0	2	0	0	0	0	0	3	0	0
MF	(Brazil)	7	Michel Bastos	2	0	1	1	0	0	4	0	0	1	0	0	8	0	1
FW	(Brazil)	9	Luís Fabiano	1	0	0	1	1	0	6	1	0	2	0	0	10	2	0
MF	(Brazil)	10	Paulo Henrique Ganso	3	0	0	2	0	0	6	1	0	0	0	0	11	1	0
FW	(Brazil)	11	Alexandre Pato	0	0	0	0	0	0	4	0	0	1	0	0	5	0	0
GK	(Brazil)	12	Denis	0	0	0	0	0	0	0	0	0	0	0	0	0	0	0
FW	(Colombia)	13	Wilder Guisao	0	0	0	0	0	0	1	0	0	1	0	0	2	0	0
FW	(Brazil)	14	Alan Kardec	0	0	0	0	0	0	2	0	0	0	0	0	2	0	0
DF	(Brazil)	16	Reinaldo	3	0	0	3	0	0	1	1	0	2	0	0	9	1	0
FW	(Brazil)	17	Rogério	0	0	0	0	0	0	1	0	0	0	0	0	1	0	0
MF	(Brazil)	19	Wesley	1	0	0	0	0	0	4	0	0	0	0	0	5	0	0
FW	(Argentina)	20	Ricardo Centurión	1	0	0	0	0	0	0	0	0	1	0	0	2	0	0
DF	(Brazil)	21	Edson Silva	1	0	0	0	0	0	2	0	0	0	0	0	3	0	0
DF	(Brazil)	22	Bruno	3	0	0	1	0	0	5	0	0	0	0	0	9	0	0
MF	(Brazil)	23	Thiago Mendes	2	0	0	0	0	0	8	0	0	3	0	0	13	0	0
MF	(Brazil)	25	Hudson	3	0	0	3	0	0	7	0	0	0	0	0	13	0	0
DF	(Brazil)	26	Luiz Eduardo	0	0	0	0	0	0	2	0	1	1	0	0	3	0	1
DF	(Brazil)	27	Auro Jr.	1	0	0	0	0	0	1	0	0	0	0	0	2	0	0
GK	(Brazil)	28	Renan Ribeiro	0	0	0	0	0	0	3	0	0	0	0	0	3	0	0
MF	(Brazil)	29	Daniel	0	0	0	0	0	0	0	0	0	0	0	0	0	0	0
DF	(Brazil)	30	Lucão	1	0	0	0	0	0	0	0	0	2	0	0	3	0	0
DF	(Brazil)	33	Breno	0	0	0	0	0	0	1	0	0	0	0	0	1	0	0
DF	(Brazil)	34	Lyanco	0	0	0	0	0	0	1	0	0	0	0	0	1	0	0
MF	(Brazil)	36	João Schmidt	0	0	0	0	0	0	0	0	0	0	0	0	0	0	0
FW	(Brazil)	37	João Paulo	0	0	0	0	0	0	0	0	0	0	0	0	0	0	0
GK	(Brazil)	40	Léo	0	0	0	0	0	0	0	0	0	0	0	0	0	0	0
Players who are on loan/left São Paulo this season:
DF	(Brazil)	2	Rafael Toloi	3	0	1	0	0	0	1	0	0	0	0	0	4	0	1
DF	(Brazil)	4	Antônio Carlos	0	0	0	0	0	0	0	0	0	0	0	0	0	0	0
MF	(Brazil)	5	Souza	3	0	0	1	0	0	1	0	0	0	0	0	5	0	0
MF	(Brazil)	8	Boschilia	1	0	0	0	0	0	0	0	0	0	0	0	1	0	0
DF	(Brazil)	13	Paulo Miranda	0	0	0	0	0	0	2	0	0	0	0	0	2	0	0
MF	(Brazil)	15	Denílson	4	0	0	5	0	0	2	0	0	0	0	0	11	0	0
FW	(Brazil)	17	Jonathan Cafu	0	0	0	0	0	0	0	0	0	0	0	0	0	0	0
MF	(Brazil)	18	Maicon	0	0	0	0	0	0	0	0	0	0	0	0	0	0	0
FW	(Brazil)	19	Ademilson	0	0	0	0	0	0	0	0	0	0	0	0	0	0	0
DF	(Brazil)	26	Dória	1	0	0	3	0	0	0	0	0	0	0	0	4	0	0
FW	(Brazil)	29	Ewandro	0	0	0	0	0	0	0	0	0	0	0	0	0	0	0
TOTAL				35	0	2	21	1	0	73	4	1	15	0	0	144	5	3

Source: Competitive matches
Ordered by (red card) , (second yellow card) and (yellow card)
(yellow card) = Number of bookings; (second yellow card) = Number of sending offs after a second yellow card; (red card) = Number of sending offs by a direct red card.

=== Clean sheets ===
Includes all competitive matches. The list is sorted by shirt number when total clean sheets are equal.

Last updated on 6 December

Rank.	Pos.	No.	Player	Campeonato Paulista	Copa Libertadores	Campeonato Brasileiro	Copa do Brasil	Total
1	GK	01	(Brazil) Rogério Ceni	8	4	10	2	24
2	GK	28	(Brazil) Renan Ribeiro	1	0	3	0	4
3	GK	12	(Brazil) Denis	1	0	2	0	3
TOTAL				10	4	15	2	31

=== Squad number changes ===
Player	Position	Old n.	New n.	Prev. to wear	Notes	Source
(Brazil) Carlinhos	LB	16	6	Vacant		
(Brazil) Reinaldo	LB	26	16	(Brazil) Carlinhos		
(Brazil) Boschilia	AM	35	8	Vacant		
(Brazil) Jonathan Cafu	FW	37	17	Vacant		
(Brazil) Lucão	CB	34	30	(Brazil) Renan Ribeiro		
(Brazil) Renan Ribeiro	GK	30	28	Vacant		

=== Managers performance ===
Name	Nationality	From	To	P	W	D	L	GF	GA	%
Muricy Ramalho	Brazil	1 February	5 April	18	11	2	5	32	13	64,81%
Milton Cruz (caretaker)	Brazil	8 April	3 June	14	9	1	4	22	10	66,66%
Juan Carlos Osorio*	Colombia	6 June	3 October	26	11	7	8	34	27	51,28%
Doriva	Brazil	14 October	8 November	7	2	1	4	10	13	33,33%
Milton Cruz (caretaker)	Brazil	19 November	6 December	4	3	0	1	9	10	75,00%

- Milton Cruz replaces Osorio in the match against Atlético Paranaense and Cruzeiro.

=== Overview ===
Games played	69 (17 Campeonato Paulista, 8 Copa Libertadores, 38 Campeonato Brasileiro, 6 Copa do Brasil)
Games won	36 (11 Campeonato Paulista, 5 Copa Libertadores, 18 Campeonato Brasileiro, 2 Copa do Brasil)
Games drawn	11 (2 Campeonato Paulista, 0 Copa Libertadores, 8 Campeonato Brasileiro, 1 Copa do Brasil)
Games lost	22 (4 Campeonato Paulista, 3 Copa Libertadores, 12 Campeonato Brasileiro, 3 Copa do Brasil)
Goals scored	107
Goals conceded	73
Goal difference	+34
Clean sheets	31
Yellow cards	144 (35 Campeonato Paulista, 21 Copa Libertadores, 73 Campeonato Brasileiro, 15 Copa do Brasil)
Second yellow cards	5 (0 Campeonato Paulista, 1 Copa Libertadores, 4 Campeonato Brasileiro, 0 Copa do Brasil)
Red cards	3 (2 Campeonato Paulista, 0 Copa Libertadores, 1 Campeonato Brasileiro, 0 Copa do Brasil)
Worst discipline	Luís Fabiano (10 (yellow card) , 2, 0 (red card) )
Best result	5–0 (A) v Bragantino - Campeonato Paulista
Worst result	1–6 (A) v Corinthians - Campeonato Brasileiro
Most appearances	Alexandre Pato (59)
Top scorer	Alexandre Pato (26)

Source: Competitions

== Friendlies ==
=== Torneio Super Series ===
23 January	Vasco da Gama	1–2	São Paulo	Manaus
22:00 UTC−02:00	Bruno 32' (o.g.)	Report	Luís Fabiano 13'; Souza 77'	Stadium: Arena da Amazônia; Attendance: 8,929; Referee: João Batista Cunha de Brito

25 January	São Paulo	0–1	Flamengo	Manaus
17:00 UTC−02:00		Report	Samir 77'	Stadium: Arena da Amazônia; Attendance: 23,973; Referee: Antônio Carlos Frutuoso

== Competitions ==
=== Campeonato Paulista ===
==== Results summary ====
Overall								Home						Away					
Pld	W	D	L	GF	GA	GD	Pts	W	D	L	GF	GA	GD	W	D	L	GF	GA	GD
17	11	2	4	34	12	+22	35	8	0	1	23	3	+20	3	2	3	11	9	+2

Group A

Pos	Team	Pld	W	D	L	GF	GA	GD	Pts	Qualification
1	São Paulo (A)	15	10	2	3	30	10	+20	32	Advance to the quarter-finals
2	Red Bull Brasil (A)	15	7	3	5	20	19	+1	24	Advance to the quarter-finals
3	Mogi Mirim	15	5	5	5	17	20	−3	20	
4	Ituano	15	4	8	3	12	13	−1	20	
5	São Bernardo	15	5	3	7	13	13	0	18	

(A) Advance to a further round

==== First stage ====
1 February 1	Penapolense	1–3	São Paulo	Penápolis
17:00 UTC−02:00	Crislan 77'	Report	Michel Bastos 14'; Luís Fabiano 47'; Jailton 85' (o.g.)	Stadium: Estádio Municipal Tenente Carriço (Tenentão); Attendance: 9,267; Referee: Guilherme Ceretta de Lima

4 February 2	São Paulo	4–2	Capivariano	São Paulo
19:30 UTC−02:00	Pato 35', 39', 67'; Alan Kardec 55'	Report	Wilian Favoni 66'; Everton Dias 70'	Stadium: Estádio Municipal Paulo Machado de Carvalho (Pacaembu); Attendance: 7,498; Referee: Flávio Rodrigues Guerra

7 February 3	São Paulo	2–0	XV de Piracicaba	São Paulo
19:30 UTC−02:00	Luís Fabiano 29'; Rogério Ceni 57' (pen.)	Report		Stadium: Estádio Municipal Paulo Machado de Carvalho (Pacaembu); Attendance: 14,481; Referee: Vinicius Furlan

11 February 4	Santos	0–0	São Paulo	Santos
22:00 UTC−02:00		Report		Stadium: Estádio Urbano Caldeira (Vila Belmiro); Attendance: 8,867; Referee: Leandro Bizzio Marinho

14 February 5	Bragantino	0–5	São Paulo	Bragança Paulista
18:30 UTC−02:00		Report	Boschilia 21', 46'; Alan Kardec 28'; Pato 35'; Centurión 90+1'	Stadium: Estádio Nabi Abi Chedid (Nabizão); Attendance: 5,626; Referee: Thiago Duarte Peixoto

21 February 6	São Paulo	4–0	Audax	São Paulo
17:00 UTC−02:00	Michel Bastos 33', 87'; Pato 34', 51'	Report		Stadium: Estádio Cícero Pompeu de Toledo (Morumbi); Attendance: 9,772; Referee: Thiago Luis Scarascati

1 March 7	Rio Claro	0–0	São Paulo	Rio Claro
16:00 UTC−03:00		Report		Stadium: Estádio Dr. Augusto Schmidt Filho (Schimitão); Attendance: 5,436; Referee: Flávio Rodrigues de Souza

8 March 8	São Paulo	0–1	Corinthians	São Paulo
16:00 UTC−03:00		Report	Danilo 11'	Stadium: Estádio Cícero Pompeu de Toledo (Morumbi); Referee: Leandro Bizzio Marinho

12 March 9	São Paulo	1–0	São Bento	São Paulo
19:30 UTC−03:00	Rogério Ceni 72' (pen.)	Report		Stadium: Estádio Cícero Pompeu de Toledo (Morumbi); Attendance: 4,507; Referee: José Cláudio Rocha Filho

15 March 10	Ponte Preta	1–2	São Paulo	Campinas
16:00 UTC−03:00	Roni 10'	Report	Paulo Miranda 65'; Alan Kardec 83'	Stadium: Estádio Moisés Lucarelli (Majestoso); Attendance: 4,460; Referee: Marcelo Aparecido Ribeiro de Souza

22 March 11	São Paulo	3–0	Marília	São Paulo
16:00 UTC−03:00	Ewandro 12'; Alan Kardec 15', 73'	Report		Stadium: Estádio Cícero Pompeu de Toledo (Morumbi); Attendance: 7,811; Referee: Thiago Duarte Peixoto

25 March 12	Palmeiras	3–0	São Paulo	São Paulo
22:00 UTC−03:00	Robinho 3'; Rafael Marques 23', 51'	Report		Stadium: Allianz Parque; Attendance: 25,804; Referee: Vinicius Furlan

29 March 13	São Paulo	3–0	Linense	São Paulo
16:00 UTC−03:00	Rogério Ceni 52'; Alan Kardec 75', 87'	Report		Stadium: Estádio Cícero Pompeu de Toledo (Morumbi); Attendance: 5,492; Referee: Guilherme Ceretta de Lima

5 April 14	Botafogo-SP	2–0	São Paulo	Ribeirão Preto
16:00 UTC−03:00	Vitor 50'; Gimenez 78'	Report		Stadium: Estádio Santa Cruz; Attendance: 4,598; Referee: Douglas Marques das Flores

8 April 15	São Paulo	3–0	Portuguesa	São Paulo
22:00 UTC−03:00	Dória 9'; Pato 11'; Hudson 56'	Report		Stadium: Estádio Cícero Pompeu de Toledo (Morumbi); Attendance: 5,232; Referee: Alessandro Darcie

==== Knockout stage ====
11 April Quarter-final	São Paulo	3–0	Red Bull Brasil	São Paulo
18:30 UTC−03:00	Rogério Ceni 44'; Pato 50'; Ganso 62'	Report		Stadium: Estádio Cícero Pompeu de Toledo (Morumbi); Attendance: 18,152; Referee: Marcelo Aparecido Ribeiro de Souza

19 April Semi-final	Santos	2–1	São Paulo	Santos
18:30 UTC−03:00	Geuvânio 35'; Ricardo Oliveira 80'	Report	Luís Fabiano 89'	Stadium: Estádio Urbano Caldeira (Vila Belmiro); Attendance: 13,459; Referee: Raphael Claus

=== Copa Libertadores ===
==== Results summary ====
Overall								Home						Away					
Pld	W	D	L	GF	GA	GD	Pts	W	D	L	GF	GA	GD	W	D	L	GF	GA	GD
8	5	0	3	10	5	+5	15	4	0	0	8	0	+8	1	0	3	2	5	−3

==== Group stage ====
Pos	Team	Pld	W	D	L	GF	GA	GD	Pts	Qualification
1	(Brazil) Corinthians	6	4	1	1	9	3	+6	13	Advance to final stages
2	(Brazil) São Paulo	6	4	0	2	9	4	+5	12	Advance to final stages
3	(Argentina) San Lorenzo	6	2	1	3	3	4	−1	7	
4	(Uruguay) Danubio	6	1	0	5	4	14	−10	3	

Source: CONMEBOL
Rules for classification: Second stage tiebreakers

18 February 1	Corinthians (Brazil)	2–0	(Brazil) São Paulo	São Paulo
22:00 UTC−02:00	Elias 11'; Jádson 67'	Report		Stadium: Arena Corinthians; Attendance: 38,487; Referee: Ricardo Marques (Brazil)

25 February 2	São Paulo (Brazil)	4–0	(Uruguay) Danubio	São Paulo
22:00 UTC−03:00	Pato 3', 40'; Reinaldo 69'; Cafu 88'	Report		Stadium: Estádio Cícero Pompeu de Toledo (Morumbi); Attendance: 16,689; Referee: Enrique Osses (Chile)

18 March 3	São Paulo (Brazil)	1–0	(Argentina) San Lorenzo	São Paulo
22:00 UTC−03:00	Michel Bastos 89'	Report		Stadium: Estádio Cícero Pompeu de Toledo (Morumbi); Attendance: 26,176; Referee: Wilmar Roldán (Colombia)

1 April 4	San Lorenzo (Argentina)	1–0	(Brazil) São Paulo	Buenos Aires
19:45 UTC−03:00	Cauteruccio 70'	Report		Stadium: Estadio Pedro Bidegain (El Nuevo Gasómetro); Referee: Enrique Osses (Chile)

15 April 5	Danubio (Uruguay)	1–2	(Brazil) São Paulo	Montevideo
22:00 UTC−03:00	Sosa 47'	Report	Pato 60'; Centurión 90'	Stadium: Estadio Luis Franzini; Referee: José Argote (Venezuela)

22 April 6	São Paulo (Brazil)	2–0	(Brazil) Corinthians	São Paulo
22:00 UTC−03:00	Luís Fabiano 31'; Michel Bastos 39'	Report		Stadium: Estádio Cícero Pompeu de Toledo (Morumbi); Attendance: 38,772; Referee: Sandro Ricci (Brazil)

==== Knockout stage ====
===== Round of 16 =====
6 May First leg	São Paulo (Brazil)	1–0	(Brazil) Cruzeiro	São Paulo
22:00 UTC−03:00	Centurión 82'	Report		Stadium: Estádio Cícero Pompeu de Toledo (Morumbi); Attendance: 66,369; Referee: Carlos Amarilla (Paraguay)

13 May Second leg	Cruzeiro (Brazil)	1–0 (1–1 agg.) (4–3 p)	(Brazil) São Paulo	Belo Horizonte
19:30 UTC−03:00	Leandro Damião 54'	Report		Stadium: Estádio Governador Magalhães Pinto (Mineirão); Attendance: 39,867; Referee: Andrés Cunha (Uruguay)
	Penalties
	Leandro Damião (penalty missed); Marquinhos (penalty scored); De Arrascaeta (penalty scored); Henrique (penalty scored); Manoel (penalty missed); Gabriel Xavier (penalty scored)		(penalty scored) Rogério Ceni; (penalty scored) Ganso; (penalty missed) Souza; (penalty missed) Luís Fabiano; (penalty scored) Centurión; (penalty missed) Lucão

=== Campeonato Brasileiro ===
==== Results summary ====
Overall								Home						Away					
Pld	W	D	L	GF	GA	GD	Pts	W	D	L	GF	GA	GD	W	D	L	GF	GA	GD
38	18	8	12	53	47	+6	62	12	6	1	35	16	+19	6	2	11	18	31	−13

==== Results by round ====
Round	1	2	3	4	5	6	7	8	9	10	11	12	13	14	15	16	17	18	19	20	21	22	23	24	25	26	27	28	29	30	31	32	33	34	35	36	37	38
Ground	H	A	H	A	H	H	A	H	A	A	H	A	H	A	H	A	H	A	H	A	H	A	H	A	A	H	A	H	H	A	H	A	H	A	H	A	H	A
Result	W	L	W	D	W	W	W	D	L	L	D	W	W	L	W	L	D	W	L	L	W	D	W	L	W	D	L	D	W	L	D	W	W	L	W	L	W	W
Position	3	9	4	6	5	2	1	2	3	7	8	7	5	7	5	7	8	4	6	6	5	5	4	5	5	4	5	6	5	5	6	5	5	5	4	4	4	4

Updated to match(es) played on 19 July. Source: São Paulo FC.net
A = Away; H = Home; W = Win; D = Draw; L = Loss

==== Matches ====
10 May 1	São Paulo	2–1	Flamengo	São Paulo
16:00 UTC−03:00	Luís Fabiano 73'; Pato 79'	Report	Éverton 85' (pen.)	Stadium: Estádio Cícero Pompeu de Toledo (Morumbi); Attendance: 13,656; Referee: Marcelo de Lima Henrique

17 May 2	Ponte Preta	1–0	São Paulo	Campinas
18:30 UTC−03:00	Renato Cajá 13'	Report		Stadium: Estádio Moisés Lucarelli (Majestoso); Attendance: 0 Referee: Raphael Claus

23 May 3	São Paulo	3–0	Joinville	São Paulo
18:30 UTC−03:00	Dória 10'; Michel Bastos 58'; Pato 86'	Report		Stadium: Estádio Cícero Pompeu de Toledo (Morumbi); Attendance: 12,690; Referee: Wagner Reway

31 May 4	Internacional	0–0	São Paulo	Porto Alegre
16:00 UTC−03:00		Report		Stadium: Estádio José Pinheiro Borda (Beira-Rio); Attendance: 25,213; Referee: Leandro Vuaden

3 June 5	São Paulo	3–2	Santos	São Paulo
21:00 UTC−03:00	Michel Bastos 33'; Paulo Miranda 50'; Rogério Ceni 84' (pen.)	Report	Ricardo Oliveira 45+1', 47'	Stadium: Estádio Cícero Pompeu de Toledo (Morumbi); Attendance: 13,806; Referee: Thiago Duarte Peixoto

6 June 6	São Paulo	2–0	Grêmio	São Paulo
22:00 UTC−03:00	Luís Fabiano 26'; Rogério Ceni 55' (pen.)	Report		Stadium: Estádio Cícero Pompeu de Toledo (Morumbi); Attendance: 16,917; Referee: Pericles Bassols Pegado Cortez

13 June 7	Chapecoense	0–1	São Paulo	Chapecó
16:20 UTC−03:00		Report	Souza 10'	Stadium: Arena Condá; Attendance: 8,712; Referee: Wilton Pereira Sampaio

21 June 8	São Paulo	1–1	Avaí	São Paulo
16:00 UTC−03:00	Souza 54'	Report	André Lima 89'	Stadium: Estádio Cícero Pompeu de Toledo (Morumbi); Attendance: 21,288; Referee: Bruno Arleu de Araújo

28 June 9	Palmeiras	4–0	São Paulo	São Paulo
16:00 UTC−03:00	Leandro Pereira 31'; Victor Ramos 40'; Rafael Marques 58'; Cristaldo 71'	Report		Stadium: Allianz Parque; Attendance: 29,233; Referee: Anderson Daronco

1 July 10	Atlético Paranaense	2–1	São Paulo	Curitiba
22:00 UTC−03:00	Gustavo 35'; Marcos Guilherme 58'	Report	Centurión 72'	Stadium: Estádio Joaquim Américo Guimarães (Arena da Baixada); Attendance: 19,971; Referee: Elmo Resende Cunha

5 July 11	São Paulo	0–0	Fluminense	São Paulo
16:00 UTC−03:00		Report		Stadium: Estádio Cícero Pompeu de Toledo (Morumbi); Attendance: 10,497; Referee: Leandro Vuaden

8 July 12	Vasco da Gama	0–4	São Paulo	Brasília
22:00 UTC−03:00		Report	Pato 12'; Michel Bastos 17'; Wesley 48'; Boschilia 90+2'	Stadium: Estádio Nacional Mané Garrincha; Attendance: 15,812; Referee: Leandro Vuaden

12 July 13	São Paulo	3–1	Coritiba	São Paulo
11:00 UTC−03:00	Centurión 14'; Pato 45+1', 90'	Report	Marcos Aurélio 59'	Stadium: Estádio Cícero Pompeu de Toledo (Morumbi); Attendance: 58,482; Referee: Alisson Sidnei Furtado

19 July 14	Sport	2–0	São Paulo	São Lourenço da Mata
16:00 UTC−03:00	Élber 35'; Ferrugem 90+2'	Report		Stadium: Itaipava Arena Pernambuco; Attendance: 35,835; Referee: André Luiz de Freitas Castro

26 July 15	São Paulo	1–0	Cruzeiro	São Paulo
16:00 UTC−03:00	Pato 44'	Report		Stadium: Estádio Cícero Pompeu de Toledo (Morumbi); Attendance: 29,648; Referee: Marcelo de Lima Henrique

29 July 16	Atlético Mineiro	3–1	São Paulo	Belo Horizonte
22:00 UTC−03:00	Pratto 19', 25', 44'	Report	Pato 58'	Stadium: Estádio Governador Magalhães Pinto (Mineirão); Attendance: 47,606; Referee: Dewson Fernando Freitas da Silva

9 August 17	São Paulo	1–1	Corinthians	São Paulo
16:00 UTC−03:00	Luís Fabiano 47'	Report	Luciano 21'	Stadium: Estádio Cícero Pompeu de Toledo (Morumbi); Attendance: 31,284; Referee: Leandro Vuaden

12 August 18	Figueirense	0–2	São Paulo	Florianópolis
22:00 UTC−03:00		Report	Pato 13'; Rogério Ceni 26' (pen.)	Stadium: Estádio Orlando Scarpelli; Attendance: 9,922; Referee: Anderson Daronco

15 August 19	São Paulo	0–3	Goiás	São Paulo
21:00 UTC−03:00		Report	Felipe Menezes 26'; Erik 44', 76'	Stadium: Estádio Cícero Pompeu de Toledo (Morumbi); Attendance: 25,406; Referee: Marielson Alves Silva

23 August 20	Flamengo	2–1	São Paulo	Rio de Janeiro
16:00 UTC−03:00	Ederson 42'; Guerrero 47'	Report	Luiz Eduardo 36'	Stadium: Estádio Jornalista Mário Filho (Maracanã); Attendance: 42,954; Referee: Anderson Daronco

29 August 21	São Paulo	3–0	Ponte Preta	São Paulo
21:00 UTC−03:00	Michel Bastos 34'; Ganso 49'; Wilder 53'	Report		Stadium: Estádio Cícero Pompeu de Toledo (Morumbi); Attendance: 12,118; Referee: Marcelo Aparecido Ribeiro de Souza

2 September 22	Joinville	0–0	São Paulo	Joinville
19:30 UTC−03:00		Report		Stadium: Arena Joinville; Attendance: 13,064; Referee: Rodolpho Toski Marques

5 September 23	São Paulo	2–0	Internacional	São Paulo
19:30 UTC−03:00	Rogério 48'; Michel Bastos 72'	Report		Stadium: Estádio Cícero Pompeu de Toledo (Morumbi); Referee: Wilton Pereira Sampaio

9 September 24	Santos	3–0	São Paulo	Santos
22:00 UTC−03:00	David Braz 31'; Rafael Longuine 42'; Ricardo Oliveira 52'	Report		Stadium: Estádio Urbano Caldeira (Vila Belmiro); Attendance: 5,552; Referee: Luiz Flavio de Oliveira

13 September 25	Grêmio	1–2	São Paulo	Porto Alegre
16:00 UTC−03:00	Everton 90+2'	Report	Pato 35'; Rogério 90'	Stadium: Arena do Grêmio; Attendance: 44,227; Referee: Sandro Meira Ricci

17 September 26	São Paulo	0–0	Chapecoense	São Paulo
19:30 UTC−03:00		Report		Stadium: Estádio Cícero Pompeu de Toledo (Morumbi); Attendance: 16,442; Referee: Elmo Alves Resende Cunha

20 September 27	Avaí	2–1	São Paulo	Florianópolis
16:00 UTC−03:00	Marquinhos 17'; Anderson Lopes 72'	Report	Breno 43'	Stadium: Estádio Aderbal Ramos da Silva (Ressacada); Attendance: 9,432; Referee: Jailson Macedo Freitas

27 September 28	São Paulo	1–1	Palmeiras	São Paulo
16:00 UTC−03:00	Carlinhos 60'	Report	Robinho 90+2'	Stadium: Estádio Cícero Pompeu de Toledo (Morumbi); Attendance: 25,047; Referee: Anderson Daronco

3 October 29	São Paulo	1–0	Atlético Paranaense	São Paulo
21:00 UTC−03:00	Rogério 71'	Report		Stadium: Estádio Cícero Pompeu de Toledo (Morumbi); Referee: Igor Junio Benevenuto

14 October 30	Fluminense	2–0	São Paulo	Rio de Janeiro
22:00 UTC−03:00	Fred 30'; Marcos Júnior 48'	Report		Stadium: Estádio Jornalista Mário Filho (Maracanã); Attendance: 9,230; Referee: Bráulio da Silva Machado

18 October 31	São Paulo	2–2	Vasco da Gama	São Paulo
16:00 UTC−03:00	Luís Fabiano 1'; Rodrigo Caio 87'	Report	Nenê 45' (pen.); Rodrigo 62'	Stadium: Estádio Cícero Pompeu de Toledo (Morumbi); Attendance: 18,329; Referee: Dewson Fernando Freitas da Silva

25 October 32	Coritiba	1–2	São Paulo	Curitiba
17:00 UTC−02:00	Cáceres 44'	Report	Alan Kardec 24'; Pato 63'	Stadium: Estádio Major Antônio Couto Pereira; Attendance: 15,002; Referee: Marielson Alves Silva

31 October 33	São Paulo	3–0	Sport	São Paulo
17:00 UTC−02:00	Ganso 18'; Luís Fabiano 43'; Michel Bastos 63'	Report		Stadium: Estádio Cícero Pompeu de Toledo (Morumbi); Attendance: 13,966; Referee: Wagner Reway

9 November 34	Cruzeiro	2–1	São Paulo	Belo Horizonte
17:00 UTC−02:00	Willian 32'; Leandro Damião 80'	Report	Luís Fabiano 30'	Stadium: Estádio Governador Magalhães Pinto (Mineirão); Attendance: 33,417; Referee: Marcelo de Lima Henrique

19 November 35	São Paulo	4–2	Atlético Mineiro	São Paulo
22:00 UTC−02:00	Alan Kardec 68', 85'; Michel Bastos 74'; Luís Fabiano 90' (pen.)	Report	Luan 56'; Dátolo 70'	Stadium: Estádio Cícero Pompeu de Toledo (Morumbi); Attendance: 18,217; Referee: Leandro Vuaden

22 November 36	Corinthians	6–1	São Paulo	São Paulo
17:00 UTC−02:00	Bruno Henrique 26'; Romero 28', 63'; Edu Dracena 45'; Lucca 60'; Cristian 76' (pen.)	Report	Carlinhos 69'	Stadium: Arena Corinthians; Attendance: 44,976; Referee: Péricles Bassols

28 November 37	São Paulo	3–2	Figueirense	São Paulo
17:00 UTC−02:00	Luís Fabiano 10'; Alan Kardec 90'; Thiago Mendes 90+3'	Report	Clayton 28'; Carlos Alberto 75'	Stadium: Estádio Cícero Pompeu de Toledo (Morumbi); Attendance: 19,987; Referee: Wagner Reway

6 December 38	Goiás	0–1	São Paulo	Goiânia
17:00 UTC−02:00		Report	Rogério 90+2'	Stadium: Estádio do Governo do Estado de Goiás (Serra Dourada); Referee: Ricardo Marques Ribeiro

=== Copa do Brasil ===
==== Results summary ====
Overall								Home						Away					
Pld	W	D	L	GF	GA	GD	Pts	W	D	L	GF	GA	GD	W	D	L	GF	GA	GD
6	2	1	3	10	9	+1	7	1	0	2	5	5	0	1	1	1	5	4	+1

==== Round of 16 ====
20 August First leg	São Paulo	1–2	Ceará	São Paulo
21:30 UTC−03:00	Pato 67'	Report	Rafael Costa 16', 65' (pen.)	Stadium: Estádio Cícero Pompeu de Toledo (Morumbi); Attendance: 12,992; Referee: Dewson Fernando Freitas da Silva

26 August Second leg	Ceará	0–3 (2–4 agg.)	São Paulo	Ceará
19:30 UTC−03:00		Report	Rogério Ceni 45' (pen.); Thiago Mendes 55'; Pato 75'	Stadium: Estádio Governador Plácido Castelo (Arena Castelão); Attendance: 41,020; Referee: Pablo dos Santos Alves

==== Quarter-finals ====
23 September First leg	São Paulo	3–0	Vasco da Gama	São Paulo
22:00 UTC−03:00	Pato 26', 36'; Luís Fabiano 75'	Report		Stadium: Estádio Cícero Pompeu de Toledo (Morumbi); Attendance: 23,273; Referee: Wilton Pereira Sampaio

30 September Second leg	Vasco da Gama	1–1 (1–4 agg.)	São Paulo	Rio de Janeiro
22:00 UTC−03:00	Riascos 16'	Report	Centurión 58'	Stadium: Estádio Jornalista Mário Filho (Maracanã); Attendance: 6,237; Referee: Marielson Alves Silva

==== Semi-finals ====
21 October First leg	São Paulo	1–3	Santos	São Paulo
22:00 UTC−03:00	Pato 25'	Report	Gabriel 14'; Ricardo Oliveira 46'; Marquinhos Gabriel 49'	Stadium: Estádio Cícero Pompeu de Toledo (Morumbi); Attendance: 26,362; Referee: Raphael Claus

28 October Second leg	Santos	3–1 (6–2 agg.)	São Paulo	Santos
22:00 UTC−03:00	Ricardo Oliveira 11', 23'; Marquinhos Gabriel 20'	Report	Michel Bastos 71'	Stadium: Estádio Urbano Caldeira (Vila Belmiro); Attendance: 13,932; Referee: Luiz Flávio de Oliveira
