= João Paulo (footballer, born 1996) =

Brazilian footballer

Personal information
- Full name: João Paulo Queiroz de Moraes
- Date of birth: 28 November 1996 (age 29)
- Place of birth: Tietê, Brazil
- Height: 1.78 m (5 ft 10 in)
- Position: Forward

Team information
- Current team: Yokohama FC
- Number: 10

Youth career
- São Paulo

Senior career*
Years	Team	Apps	(Gls)
2015–2018	São Paulo	4	(0)
2016–2017	→ Bahia (loan)	13	(3)
2018	→ Criciúma (loan)	31	(6)
2019	Ceará	14	(1)
2020	Oeste	10	(2)
2020	Guarani	2	(0)
2021–2022	Hồ Chí Minh City	12	(0)
2022–2023	Desportivo Brasil	14	(2)
2023–2024	Oliveirense	36	(6)
2024–	Yokohama FC	55	(10)
- * Club domestic league appearances and goals as of 14 August 2026

João Paulo Queiroz de Moraes (born 28 November 1996), known as João Paulo, is a Brazilian professional footballer who plays as a forward for J2 League club Yokohama FC.

== Club career ==
=== São Paulo ===
Born in Tietê, São Paulo, João Paulo graduated from the youth academy of local São Paulo FC. He went on to score seven goals in the 2015 Copa São Paulo de Futebol Júnior, one goal shy of the top scorer Gabriel Vasconcelos. Amidst interest from Palmeiras, Fluminense and Corinthians, he extended his contract till 2019 on 21 February.

Ahead of the 2015 season, João Paulo was promoted to the senior team. On 23 May, he made his professional debut, coming on as a substitute for Michel Bastos in a 3–0 win against Joinville.

On 7 July 2016, João Paulo was loaned out to Bahia till May 2017. On 3 March 2017, he scored his first professional goal, in a 3–0 win against Altos in that season's Copa do Nordeste. On 2 June, his loan was extended until the end of the season.

On 27 December 2017, João Paulo was loaned out to Criciúma for the season . He went on to score two goals in the Campeonato Catarinense. On 13 April 2018, he scored his first Série B goal for the club in a 3–2 defeat against Atlético Goianiense.

=== Ceará ===
On 30 December 2018, João Paulo joined Ceará for the upcoming season.

== Career statistics ==
As of 13 May 2019

Club	Season	League			State League		Cup		Continental		Other		Total	
Club	Season	Division	Apps	Goals	Apps	Goals	Apps	Goals	Apps	Goals	Apps	Goals	Apps	Goals
São Paulo	2015	Série A	4	0	0	0	0	0	0	0	—		4	0
Bahia (loan)	2016	Série B	1	0	0	0	0	0	—		—		1	0
Bahia (loan)	2017	Série A	8	2	2	0	0	0	—		2 (Note: Appearance(s) in Copa do Nordeste)	1	12	3
Bahia (loan)	Total		9	2	2	0	0	0	—		2	1	13	3
Criciúma (loan)	2018	Série B	14	4	15	2	2	0	—		—		31	6
Ceará	2019	Série A	0	0	7	1	4	0	—		2	0	13	1
Career total			27	6	24	3	6	0	0	0	4	1	61	10
