= Paulo Henrique Ganso =

Brazilian footballer (born 1989)

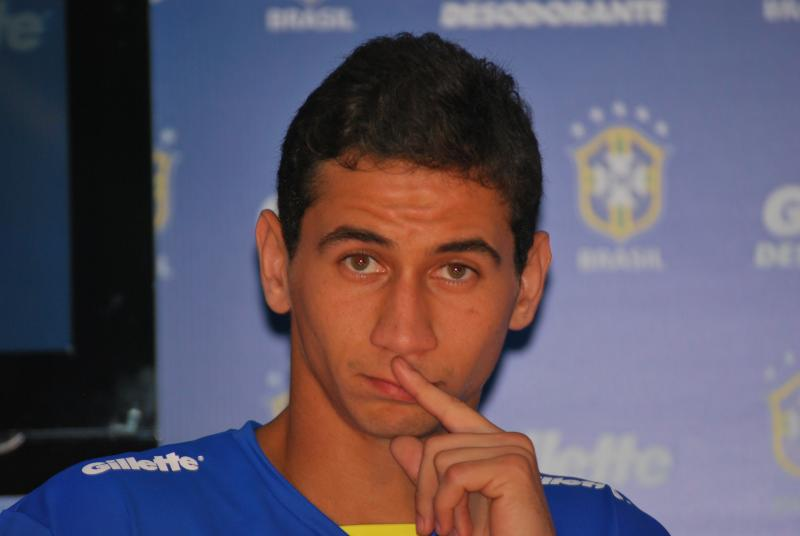
- Ganso in 2009

Personal information
- Full name: Paulo Henrique Chagas de Lima
- Date of birth: 12 October 1989 (age 37)
- Place of birth: Ananindeua, Brazil
- Height: 1.84 m (6 ft 0 in)
- Position: Attacking midfielder

Team information
- Current team: Fluminense
- Number: 10

Youth career
- 1996–2004: Tuna Luso
- 2005: Paysandu
- 2005–2008: Santos

Senior career*
Years	Team	Apps	(Gls)
2008–2012	Santos	121	(29)
2012–2016	São Paulo	159	(17)
2016–2019	Sevilla	18	(4)
2018–2019	→ Amiens (loan)	12	(0)
2019–	Fluminense	242	(22)

International career^{‡}
2009	Brazil U20	7	(1)
2012	Brazil U23	3	(0)
2010–2012	Brazil	8	(0)
Medal record
Representing Brazil
Men's Football
Silver medal – second place	2012 London	Team
- * Club domestic league appearances and goals as of 23:05, 24 October 2026 (UTC) ‡ National team caps and goals as of 22:55, 2 June 2012 (UTC)

Paulo Henrique Chagas de Lima (born 12 October 1989), known as Paulo Henrique Ganso or just Ganso (lit. "goose"), is a Brazilian professional footballer who plays for Fluminense as an attacking midfielder.

A Santos youth graduate, Ganso was nominated in 2009 for the Breakthrough Player in Campeonato Brasileiro Série A. He won a number of trophies including the 2011 Copa Libertadores. In 2012, he moved to São Paulo, being named the best midfielder in the 2014 Campeonato Brasileiro Série A before joining Sevilla in 2016. He could not establish himself as a starter at the Spanish side, and in 2019, after a brief period on loan at Amiens, he returned to his home country with Fluminense.

Ganso played eight games for the Brazil national team, and was part of the squads at the 2011 Copa América and Copa América Centenario. He won a silver medal at the 2012 Olympic tournament.

== Club career ==
=== Santos ===
Ganso was brought to Tuna Luso after being discovered by former Brazil international Giovanni, and at 15 years of age he joined Paysandu. He was signed by Santos in 2005.

In 2007, after an injury that sidelined him for six months, Ganso played in and won the final of the U-20 Campeonato Paulista. He wore the number 10 jersey in Santos' campaign in the Copa São Paulo of 2008, where his team was eliminated in the quarter-finals by Sport Club Internacional. He won the 2010 Campeonato Paulista with Santos on 2 May 2010, defeating Santo André in the final.

In August 2010, it was reported that Ganso would have surgery on his injured left knee and would be out for six months.

In October 2010, Santos offered "agent company" DIS Group (subsidiary of Sonda Group, a Brazil supermarket chain; the D stands for Sonda president Delcir Sonda) to buy 70% image rights of the player, but the group did not accept the offer. He had a contract which would last until 28 February 2015 with a termination fee of €50 million. Group DIS reportedly owned 45% of the sporting rights of Ganso (which made the group eligible to receive a 45% transfer fee from Santos) after the court ruled in their favour.

=== São Paulo ===
On 20 September 2012, after a hard period of negotiation, it was confirmed by São Paulo that Ganso had signed a five-year contract, for a R$23.940 million transfer fee. Ganso would wear the number 8, previously used by Fabrício.

After getting back in great shape, Ganso was praised by club coach Muricy Ramalho. According to Ramalho, who worked with Ganso for Santos: "Now, we have a number 10 shirt." In Brazil, this number is associated with playmaking.

Ganso started 2014 in a bad phase, but after Jádson left in a negotiation that brought Alexandre Pato to São Paulo he was awarded the number 10 shirt, and was hopeful that the new jersey number would give him confidence, and that his performances would improve. Ganso stated: "I am very happy to wear the shirt of São Paulo and, now, to be given the number 10 shirt. This number was already worn by so many good players and I feel an immense happiness to be among them. My playing style is more traditional and I am told that a number 10 must know how to play in this manner. I think I will be able to combine the efficient with the aesthetic: classic football with the number 10 shirt."

=== Sevilla ===
On 16 July 2016, Ganso signed for Spanish La Liga side Sevilla FC for a fee of €10 million. He scored his first league goals for the club on 21 April 2017, netting a brace in a 2–0 win over Granada.

==== Loan to Amiens ====
On 31 August 2018, the last day of the 2018 summer transfer window, Ganso joined Ligue 1 club Amiens SC on a season-long loan. Amiens secured an option to sign him permanently.

=== Fluminense ===
On 31 January 2019, Ganso returned to Brazil and signed a five-year contract with Fluminense.

== International career ==
In 2009, he was called up to play for Brazil in the World Under-20 Championships. In early 2010, the Brazilian media began calling for Brazil national team coach Dunga to choose Ganso for the 2010 World Cup in South Africa, primarily as a substitute for Kaká, because of their similar styles of play. On 11 May 2010, he was named as one of seven backup players for the 23-man 2010 FIFA World Cup Brazil squad.

On 26 July 2010, he was called up by the new coach Mano Menezes to the Brazil national football team for a friendly match against United States. In the game on 10 August, he made his senior debut, where one of his shots hit the post. He was named in Menezes' 23-man 2011 Copa América squad and was given the number 10 shirt. During their second group game against Paraguay, on 9 July, Ganso assisted Jádson's goal as well as a last-minute equalising goal from Fred to draw the game 2–2. Brazil were later eliminated by Paraguay in the quarter-finals of the tournament, following a penalty shoot-out.

Ganso took part in the 2012 Summer Olympics in London, where Brazil achieved a silver medal.

Following injuries to Douglas Costa and Kaká, Ganso was called up to Brazil's Copa América Centenario squad as a replacement by Dunga, and was named in the 23-man final list, being given the number 7 shirt.

== Style of play ==
Ganso plays anywhere in midfield. He has been regarded as an elegant offensive left-footed playmaker, with critics praising his dribbling skills and ball control, as well as his ability in providing defensive assists for teammates. He is also known to be able to perform a powerful and accurate shot from distance. Regarded as highly promising prospect in his youth, his efficient rather than flamboyant playing style initially drew comparisons with compatriot Kaká; despite his talent, however, he has been criticised by some in the media in recent years for his lack of pace, mobility, and dynamism, as well as his poor work-rate and lack of consistency, which has led him to be accused of not living up to his potential. He is also known to be injury–prone.

Ganso has been a fundamental presence in midfield for both Santos and São Paulo, due to the enormous quality of his passes. After being a potential favorite name to wear the number 10 shirt for Brazil in the 2010 FIFA World Cup, Ganso was not called up for the tournament by Dunga, the nation's national football coach at the time, as the number 10 shirt went to Kaká. After suffering recurring injuries and a decrease in form and match fitness, he subsequently lost his place in the Brazilian team, in favour of Oscar, due to his performances with his club at the time, Chelsea. In 2012, Ganso refound his form and put on a notable performance in the derby against Corinthians, helping his team to a 3–1 victory, and, in 2013, he shone in a 2–0 win against Atlético Mineiro, as São Paulo advanced to the third stage of the 2013 Copa Libertadores.

After Muricy Ramalho's arrival, Ganso had put on good performances. On 16 October 2013, he scored a notable goal in São Paulo's 3–0 victory over Náutico in the Brazilian League, dribbling past four opponents before shooting on goal past the keeper.

== Career statistics ==
=== Club ===
As of match played 24 October 2026

Appearances and goals by club, season and competition
Club	Season	League			State league (Note: Includes Campeonato Paulista, Campeonato Carioca)		National cup (Note: Includes Copa do Brasil, Copa del Rey)		Continental		Other		Total	
Club	Season	Division	Apps	Goals	Apps	Goals	Apps	Goals	Apps	Goals	Apps	Goals	Apps	Goals
Santos	2008	Série A	3	0	3	0	—		0	0	—		6	0
Santos	2009	Série A	33	8	8	1	4	0	—		—		45	9
Santos	2010	Série A	11	0	20	11	10	2	2 (Note: Appearances in Copa Sudamericana)	0	—		43	13
Santos	2011	Série A	13	2	9	2	—		7 (Note: Appearances in Copa Libertadores)	1	2 (Note: Appearances in FIFA Club World Cup)	0	31	5
Santos	2012	Série A	5	1	16	4	—		12	3	1 (Note: Appearances in Recopa Sudamericana)	0	34	8
Santos	Total		65	11	56	18	14	2	21	4	3	0	159	35
São Paulo	2012	Série A	3	0	—		—		2	0	—		5	0
São Paulo	2013	Série A	31	1	16	2	—		13 (Note: Nine appearances in Copa Libertadores, four appearances and one goal in Copa Sudamericana)	1	3 (Note: Two appearances in Recopa Sudamericana, one appearance and one goal in Suruga Bank Championship)	1	63	5
São Paulo	2014	Série A	34	5	15	1	6	0	6	3	—		61	9
São Paulo	2015	Série A	31	2	8	1	6	0	8	0	—		53	3
São Paulo	2016	Série A	7	1	14	4	0	0	11	2	—		32	7
São Paulo	Total		106	9	53	8	12	0	40	6	3	1	214	24
Sevilla	2016–17	La Liga	10	2	—		3	1	1 (Note: Appearance in UEFA Champions League)	0	2 (Note: Appearances in Supercopa de España)	0	16	3
Sevilla	2017–18	La Liga	8	2	—		2	1	1	1	—		11	4
Sevilla	2018–19	La Liga	0	0	—		0	0	1 (Note: Appearance in UEFA Europa League)	0	0	0	1	0
Sevilla	Total		18	4	—		5	2	3	1	2	0	28	7
Amiens	2018–19	Ligue 1	12	0	—		0	0	—		1 (Note: Appearance in Coupe de la Ligue)	0	13	0
Fluminense	2019	Série A	28	2	7	1	6	2	6	0	—		47	5
Fluminense	2020	Série A	18	1	7	0	6	0	1	0	—		32	1
Fluminense	2021	Série A	10	0	8	3	3	0	2	0	—		23	3
Fluminense	2022	Série A	33	5	9	0	7	3	8	1	—		57	9
Fluminense	2023	Série A	27	3	12	1	3	0	12	0	2	0	56	4
Fluminense	2024	Série A	32	3	5	0	3	0	9	1	2	0	51	4
Fluminense	2025	Série A	17	1	0	0	6	1	4	0	1	0	28	2
Fluminense	2026	Série A	23	0	6	2	2	0	9	0	—		40	2
Fluminense	Total		188	15	54	7	36	6	51	2	5	0	334	30
Career total			389	39	163	33	72	10	110	13	14	1	748	96

=== International ===
As of match played on 17 June 2018

Appearances and goals by national team and year
National team	Year	Apps	Goals
Brazil	2010	1	0
Brazil	2011	6	0
Brazil	2012	1	0
Total		8	0

== Honours ==
Santos

- Campeonato Paulista: 2010, 2011, 2012
- Copa do Brasil: 2010
- Copa Libertadores: 2011
- Recopa Sudamericana: 2012

São Paulo

- Copa Sudamericana: 2012

Fluminense

- Copa Libertadores: 2023
- Recopa Sudamericana: 2024
- Campeonato Carioca: 2022, 2023
- Taça Guanabara: 2022, 2023

Brazil

- Olympic Silver Medal: 2012

Individual

- Copa do Brasil Best Player: 2010
- Bola de Prata: 2014
- South American Team of the Year: 2011
- Campeonato Paulista Team of the year: 2010, 2012
