= Hudson (footballer, born 1988) =

Brazilian footballer

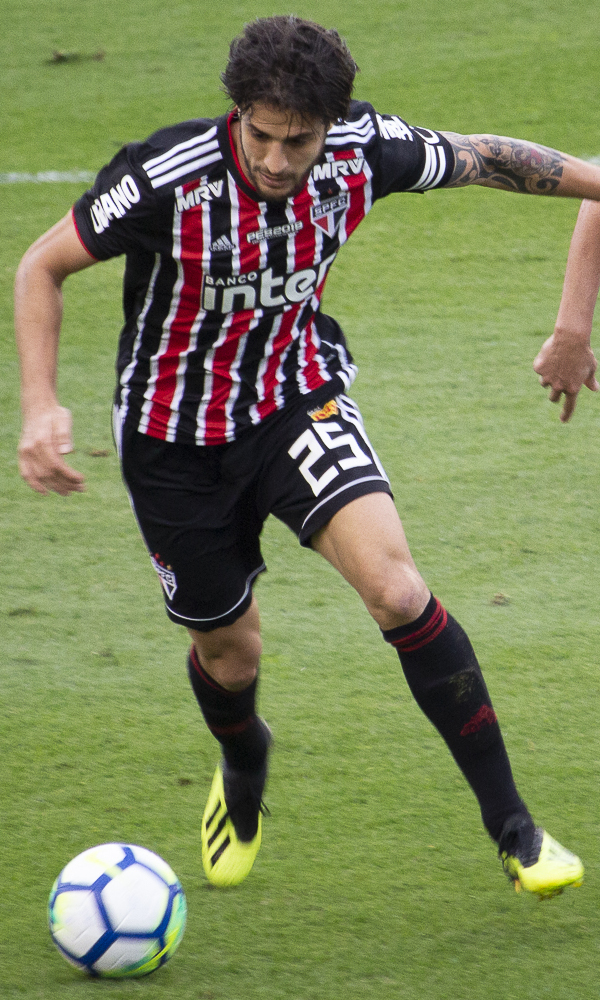

Personal information
- Full name: Hudson Rodrigues dos Santos
- Date of birth: 30 January 1988 (age 38)
- Place of birth: Juiz de Fora, Brazil
- Height: 1.79 m (5 ft 10 in)
- Position: Defensive midfielder

Youth career
- 2006: Santos

Senior career*
Years	Team	Apps	(Gls)
2007–2009	Santos	6	(0)
2009	→ Santa Cruz (loan)	2	(0)
2009	→ Ituano (loan)	3	(0)
2010–2011	Red Bull Brasil	35	(2)
2011–2012	Comercial-SP	6	(0)
2012–2013	Oeste	31	(3)
2013	Brasiliense	11	(0)
2014	→ Botafogo-SP (loan)	14	(4)
2014–2022	São Paulo	157	(5)
2017	→ Cruzeiro (loan)	24	(1)
2020–2022	→ Fluminense (loan)	42	(1)
- * Club domestic league appearances and goals as of 15:18, 10 November 2021 (UTC)

Hudson Rodrigues dos Santos (born 30 January 1988), simply known as Hudson, is a Brazilian former professional footballer. Mainly a defensive midfielder, he also played as a right-back.

== Club career ==
Born in Juiz de Fora, Minas Gerais, Hudson joined Santos' youth setup in 2006. On 13 May of the following year, as all of the starters were resting due to the Copa Libertadores fixtures, he made his first team – and Série A – debut by coming on as a second-half substitute for Vinícius in a 4–1 away loss against Sport; it was his only appearance of the campaign.

After being rarely used, Hudson had loan spells with Santa Cruz, Ituano, Red Bull Brasil and Comercial before joining Oeste on 18 May 2012. He was a regular starter with the latter during their Série C winning campaign.

On 23 May 2013, Hudson signed for Brasiliense, also in the third division. On 19 December he agreed to a contract with Botafogo, on loan until the end of the Campeonato Paulista.

After impressing with Bota during the tournament, Hudson signed a contract with São Paulo on 8 April 2014, until December. He made his debut for the club late in the month, replacing Maicon in a 1–1 away draw against Cruzeiro.

On 17 October 2014 Hudson renewed his contract, signing until December 2017. On 6 December 2016, he further extended his deal for two more seasons.

On 22 December 2016, Hudson joined Cruzeiro on a one-year loan deal, with Neílton moving in the opposite direction. With the club he scored his first goal in the main category the following 9 July, netting the second in a 3–1 home win against Palmeiras.

On January 8, 2020, Hudson was loaned for Fluminense. His contract with Tricolor Carioca runs until December 2020.

== Career statistics ==
As of 10 November 2021

Club	Season	League			State League		Cup		Continental		Other		Total	
Club	Season	Division	Apps	Goals	Apps	Goals	Apps	Goals	Apps	Goals	Apps	Goals	Apps	Goals
Santos	2007	Série A	1	0	—		—		—		—		1	0
Santos	2008	Série A	4	0	1	0	—		—		—		5	0
Santos	Subtotal		5	0	1	0	—		—		—		6	0
Santa Cruz (loan)	2009	Série D	0	0	2	0	0	0	—		—		2	0
Ituano (loan)	2009	Série D	3	0	—		—		—		17 (Note: Appearance(s) in Copa Paulista)	2	20	2
Red Bull Brasil	2010	Paulista A3	—		23	2	—		—		23	3	46	5
Red Bull Brasil	2011	Paulista A2	—		12	0	—		—		—		12	0
Red Bull Brasil	Subtotal		—		35	2	—		—		23	3	58	5
Comercial-SP	2011	Paulista A2	—		—		—		—		24	4	24	4
Comercial-SP	2012	Paulista	—		6	0	—		—		—		6	0
Comercial-SP	Subtotal		—		6	0	—		—		24	4	30	4
Oeste	2012	Série C	19	3	—		—		—		—		19	3
Oeste	2013	Série B	0	0	12	0	—		—		—		12	0
Oeste	Subtotal		19	3	12	0	—		—		—		31	3
Brasiliense	2013	Série C	11	0	—		—		—		—		11	0
Botafogo-SP	2014	Paulista	—		14	4	—		—		—		14	4
São Paulo	2014	Série A	19	0	—		0	0	7 (Note: All appearance(s) in Copa Sudamericana)	1	—		26	1
São Paulo	2015	Série A	29	0	10	1	2	0	5 (Note: All appearance(s) in Copa Libertadores)	0	—		46	1
São Paulo	2016	Série A	19	0	14	1	2	0	14	0	—		49	1
São Paulo	2018	Série A	31	1	5	0	3	0	2	0	—		41	1
São Paulo	2019	Série A	16	1	14	1	1	0	1	0	—		32	2
São Paulo	2021	Série A	0	0	0	0	0	0	0	0	—		0	0
São Paulo	Subtotal		114	2	43	3	8	0	29	1	—		194	6
Cruzeiro (loan)	2017	Série A	17	1	7	0	9	2	2	0	—		35	3
Fluminense (loan)	2020	Série A	25	0	13	1	4	0	1	0	—		43	1
Fluminense (loan)	2021	Série A	0	0	4	0	0	0	0	0	—		4	0
Fluminense (loan)	Subtotal		25	0	17	1	4	0	1	0	—		47	1
Career total			194	6	137	10	21	2	32	1	64	9	448	28

== Honours ==
Cruzeiro

- Copa do Brasil: 2017

Fluminense

- Campeonato Carioca: 2020
