= Denis (footballer, born 1987) =

Brazilian footballer

Personal information
- Full name: Denis César de Matos
- Date of birth: 14 April 1987 (age 39)
- Place of birth: Jaú, Brazil
- Height: 1.88 m (6 ft 2 in)
- Position: Goalkeeper

Team information
- Current team: Sport
- Number: 12

Youth career
- 2002–2006: Ponte Preta

Senior career*
Years	Team	Apps	(Gls)
2006–2009	Ponte Preta	38	(0)
2009–2017	São Paulo	83	(0)
2017–2019	Figueirense	46	(0)
2019–2021	Gil Vicente	66	(0)
2021–2022	Aris	4	(0)
2022–	Sport	11	(0)
- * Club domestic league appearances and goals as of 16 April 2026

Denis César de Matos (14 April 1987), known as just Denis, is a Brazilian professional footballer who plays as a goalkeeper for Brazilian club Sport.

== Career ==
Denis was born in Jaú, São Paulo. A Ponte Preta youth graduate, he was promoted to the main squad in 2006, but was third-choice (behind Jean and Aranha). He made his first team debut on 24 February 2007, starting in a 1–2 away loss against Grêmio Barueri for the Campeonato Paulista championship.

Denis appeared regularly during that year's Série B, mainly profiting from Aranha's injury. He would spend the rest of his spell as a backup, however.

Denis moved to São Paulo on 22 January 2009. He made his debut for the club three days later, replacing injured Rogério Ceni in a 2–0 away win against Portuguesa. He would spend his first two years behind Ceni and Bosco.

In 2011 Denis was promoted to back up, after Bosco's retirement. In the following year, after profiting from Ceni's serious injury, he appeared regularly for Tricolor, but was again backup after the latter's recovery.

=== Aris ===
On 2 July 2021, Greek Super League club Aris announced he signed a two-year contract with the club.

On 22 July 2021, Denis made his debut for Aris on a 2-0 away loss against Astana fc for the 2nd play off round of Conference League

== Career statistics ==
As of 10 April 2017

Club	Season	Série A		Copa do Brasil		Continental Competitions^{1}		Other Tournaments^{2}		Total		Friendlies		Overall Total	
Club	Season	Apps	Goals	Apps	Goals	Apps	Goals	Apps	Goals	Apps	Goals	Apps	Goals	Apps	Goals
Ponte Preta	2006	0	0	0	0	0	0	0	0	0	0	0	0	0	0
Ponte Preta	2007	33	0	0	0	0	0	7	0	40	0	0	0	40	0
Ponte Preta	2008	5	0	0	0	0	0	0	0	5	0	0	0	5	0
Ponte Preta	Subtotal	38	0	0	0	0	0	7	0	45	0	0	0	45	0
São Paulo	2009	17	0	0	0	2	0	1	0	19	0	0	0	20	0
São Paulo	2010	0	0	0	0	0	0	0	0	0	0	0	0	0	0
São Paulo	2011	3	0	0	0	1	0	0	0	4	0	0	0	4	0
São Paulo	2012	14	0	9	0	0	0	21	0	44	0	0	0	44	0
São Paulo	2013	3	0	0	0	0	0	8	0	11	0	3	0	14	0
São Paulo	2014	3	0	0	0	0	0	2	0	5	0	0	0	5	0
São Paulo	2015	6	0	1	0	0	0	1	0	8	0	0	0	8	0
São Paulo	2016	37	0	2	0	13	0	16	0	68	0	1	0	69	0
São Paulo	2017	0	0	3	0	1	0	3	0	7	0	6	0	13	0
São Paulo	Subtotal	83	0	15	0	17	0	52	0	166	0	10	0	177	0
Career Totals		121	0	15	0	17	0	59	0	211	0	10	0	222	0

^{1} Includes matches and goals in Copa Libertadores, Copa Sudamericana.

^{2} Includes matches and goals in Campeonato Paulista.

== Honours ==
São Paulo

- Copa Sudamericana: 2012
- Florida Cup: 2017

Figueirense

- Campeonato Catarinense: 2018

Sport Recife

- Campeonato Pernambucano: 2023, 2024
