= Matheus Banguelê =

Brazilian footballer

Personal information
- Full name: Matheus de Jesus Cardoso
- Date of birth: 22 February 1996 (age 30)
- Place of birth: Porto Seguro, Brazil
- Height: 1.80 m (5 ft 11 in)
- Position: Midfielder

Team information
- Current team: Louletano

Youth career
- São Francisco-BA
- 2013–2014: Bahia
- 2015–2016: São José
- 2015: → São Paulo (loan)
- 2016–2017: São Paulo
- 2017–: Internacional

Senior career*
Years	Team	Apps	(Gls)
2016–2017	São Paulo	1	(0)
2017	→ Novorizontino (loan)	0	(0)
2017–2018	Internacional	0	(0)
2018–	Louletano	23	(0)
- * Club domestic league appearances and goals as of 14:31, 5 May 2019 (UTC)

Matheus de Jesus Cardoso (born 22 February 1996), commonly known as Matheus Banguelê, is a Brazilian footballer who plays as a midfielder for Louletano.

== Club career ==
Banguelê joined Grêmio Novorizontino on loan ahead of the 2017 Campeonato Paulista.

== Career statistics ==
=== Club ===
As of 5 May 2019.

Club	Season	League			State League		Cup		Continental		Other		Total	
Club	Season	Division	Apps	Goals	Apps	Goals	Apps	Goals	Apps	Goals	Apps	Goals	Apps	Goals
São Paulo	2016	Série A	1	0	0	0	0	0	0	0	6 (Note: Appearances in the Copa Paulista)	0	7	0
Grêmio Novorizontino (loan)	2017	–			4 (Note: Appearances in the Campeonato Paulista)	0	0	0	–		0	0	4	0
Internacional	2017	Série B	0	0	0	0	0	0	–		0	0	0	0
Internacional	2018	Série A	0	0	0	0	0	0	–		0	0	0	0
Louletano	2018–19	Campeonato de Portugal	23	0	–		2 (Note: Appearances in the Taça de Portugal)	0	–		0	0	25	0
Career total			24	0	4	0	0	0	0	0	8	0	36	0
