= Matheus Queiroz =

Brazilian footballer

Queiroz
Personal information
- Full name: Matheus Queiroz Moura
- Date of birth: 12 February 1996 (age 30)
- Place of birth: Ituiutaba, Brazil
- Height: 1.77 m (5 ft 9 1/2 in)
- Position: Midfielder

Youth career
- 2010–2017: São Paulo

Senior career*
Years	Team	Apps	(Gls)
2016–2017	São Paulo	0	(0)
2016	→ Boa (loan)	2	(0)
2017	→ CRB (loan)	0	(0)
2017–2018	CRB	0	(0)
2019–2020	Inter de Limeira	0	(0)
2020–2023	Desportivo Brasil	23	(0)
2021	→ Boston City-MG (loan)	0	(0)
Medal record
Boa
Winner	Série C	2016
- * Club domestic league appearances and goals as of 16 November 2023

Matheus Queiroz Moura (born 12 February 1996), commonly known as Matheus Queiroz or Queiroz, is a Brazilian footballer who plays as a midfielder.

== Career statistics ==
=== Club ===
As of 29 July 2018.

Club	Season	League			Cup		Continental		Other		Total	
Club	Season	Division	Apps	Goals	Apps	Goals	Apps	Goals	Apps	Goals	Apps	Goals
Boa (loan)	2016	Série C	2	0	0	0	–		4 (Note: Appearances in the Campeonato Mineiro)	0	6	0
São Paulo B	2017	–			8 (Note: Appearances in the Copa Paulista)	0	–		0	0	8	0
Career total			2	0	8	0	0	0	4	0	14	0

== Honours ==
São Paulo

- U-20 Copa Libertadores: 2016

Boa Esporte

- Campeonato Brasileiro Série C: 2016
