= Michel Bastos =

Brazilian footballer (born 1983)

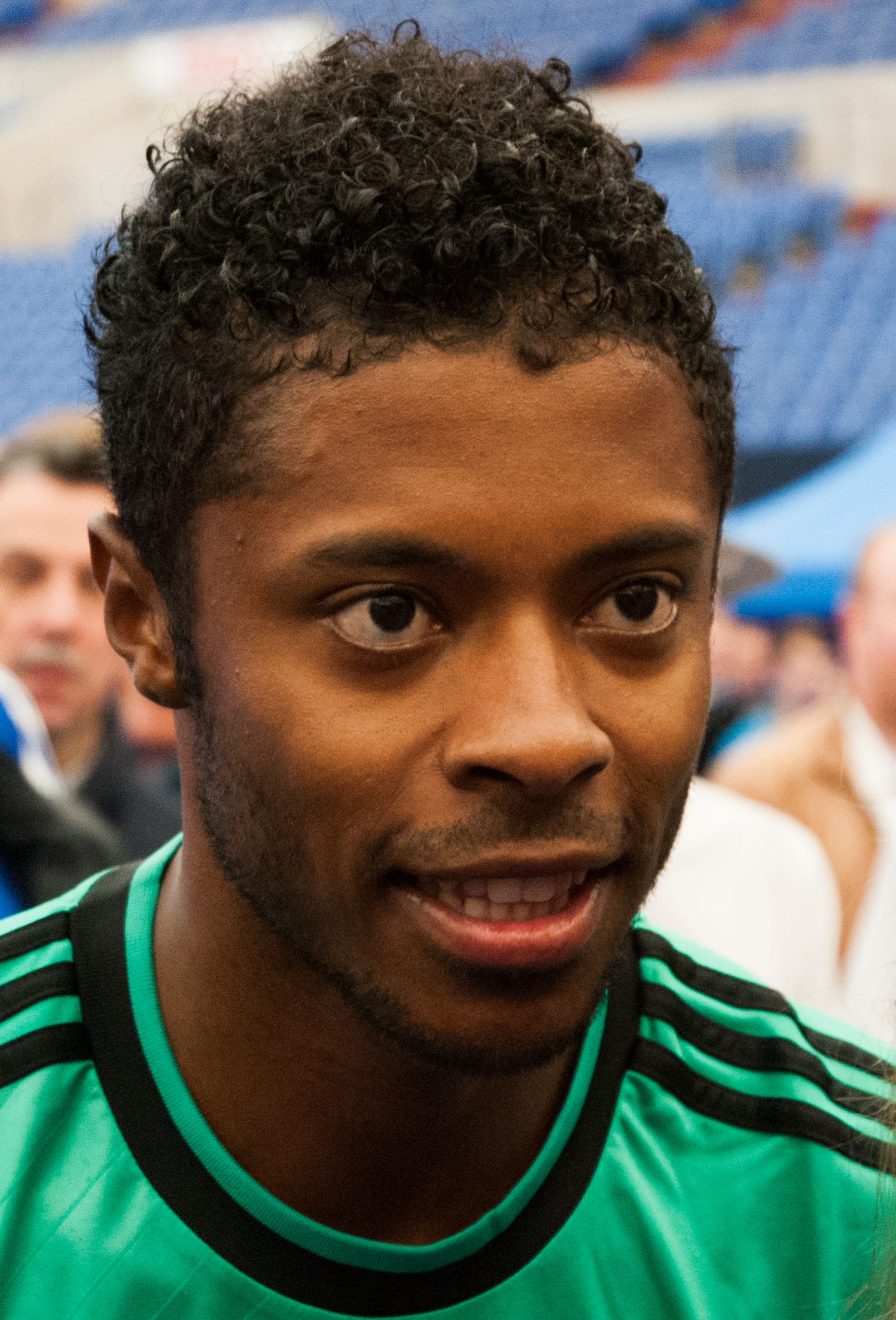
- Bastos in 2013

Personal information
- Full name: Michel Fernandes Bastos
- Date of birth: 2 August 1983 (age 43)
- Place of birth: Pelotas, Brazil
- Height: 1.79 m (5 ft 10 in)
- Positions: Left winger; left midfielder; left-back

Youth career
- 1994–2001: Pelotas

Senior career*
Years	Team	Apps	(Gls)
2001–2002	Pelotas		
2002–2003	Feyenoord	0	(0)
2002–2003	→ Excelsior (loan)	28	(0)
2003–2006	Atlético Paranaense	10	(0)
2004	→ Grêmio (loan)	19	(4)
2005	→ Figueirense (loan)	34	(10)
2006–2009	Lille	97	(25)
2009–2013	Lyon	98	(26)
2013	→ Schalke 04 (loan)	14	(4)
2013–2014	Al Ain	12	(4)
2014	→ Roma (loan)	16	(1)
2014–2016	São Paulo	86	(13)
2017–2018	Palmeiras	36	(2)
2018	→ Sport do Recife (loan)	23	(4)
2019	América (MG)	1	(0)
Total		433	(86)

International career
2009–2010	Brazil	10	(1)
- * Club domestic league appearances and goals

Michel Fernandes Bastos (born 2 August 1983) is a Brazilian retired professional footballer who mainly played as a left winger.

Bastos started his career at hometown club Pelotas before moving to the Netherlands, where he played for Feyenoord and Excelsior. He then returned to Brazil, where he played for Atlético Paranaense, Grêmio and Figueirense. He moved to French club Lille in 2006 before transferring to Lyon in 2009. After unsuccessful spells at Schalke 04, Al Ain and Roma, he moved back to Brazil to play for São Paulo in 2014. He joined Palmeiras in 2017 and had a spell at Sport do Recife in 2018. He signed for América (MG) in 2019.

Bastos has won 10 caps and scored 1 goal for the Brazil national team. He was a starter at the 2010 World Cup, playing as a left-back. Bastos was known to be a free kick specialist throughout his career.

== Club career ==
Bastos was born in the Brazilian city of Pelotas and began his career playing for hometown club Esporte Clube Pelotas. In 2001, he moved to the Netherlands joining Dutch club Feyenoord Rotterdam playing for the Jong Feyenoord, the club's reserve section. Following a loan stint at nearby Excelsior Rotterdam, he returned to Brazil joining Atlético Paranaense. Bastos later played for Grêmio and Figueirense (loan) before deciding to return to Europe.

=== Lille ===
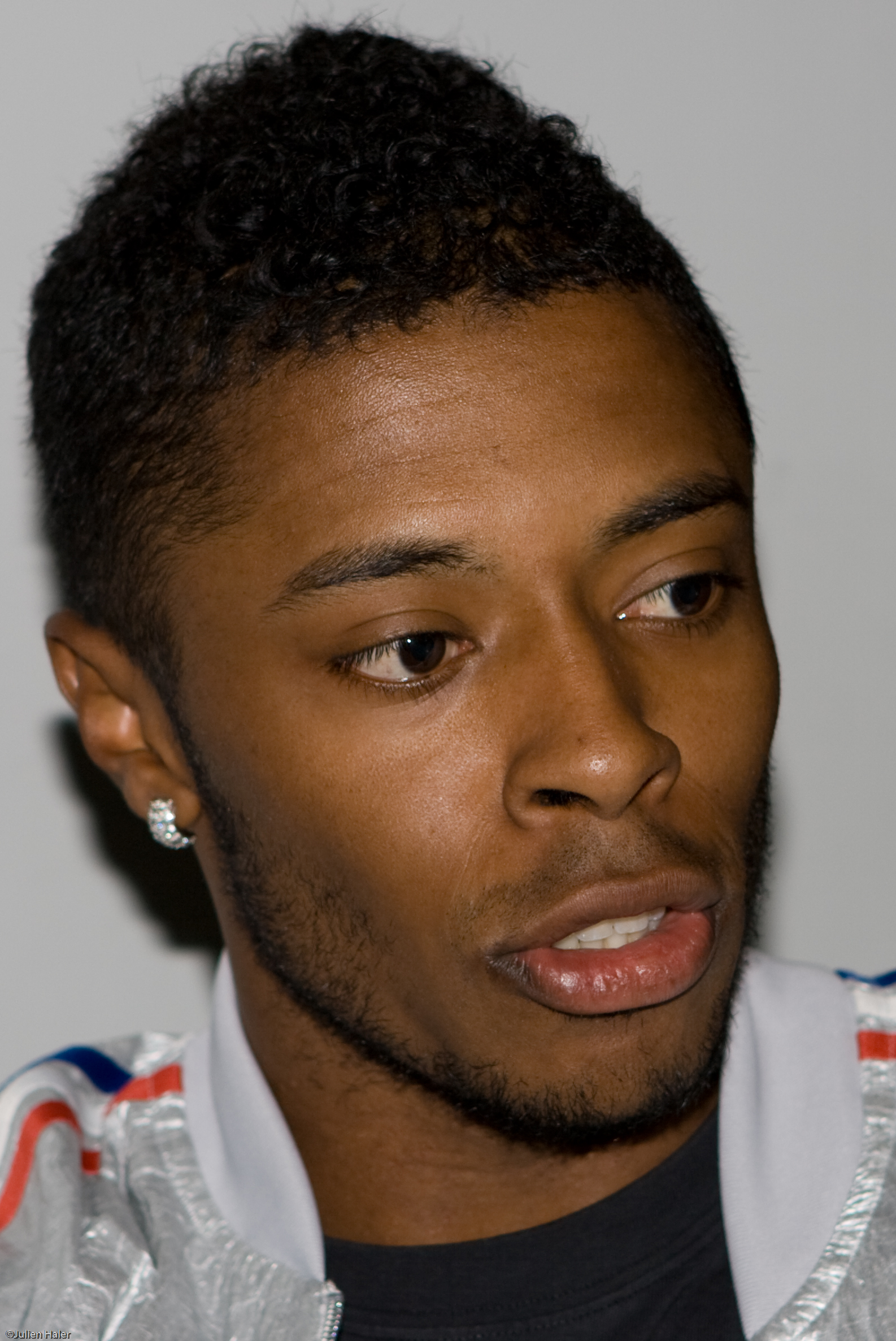
Bastos in 2009

Bastos joined French club Lille in July 2006 and made his league debut in the club's opening match of the 2006–07 season against Rennes playing 65 minutes before taken off. Lille won the match 2–1. Bastos scored his first goal for the club against Lens in the annual Derby du Nord and finished the season with a total of three goals. Over the next two seasons, his goal tally quickly increased. He scored eight league goals during the 2007–08 season, including goals against Rennes, Lyon, and Lorient to help Lille finish in a respectable seventh place. During this season, Bastos began alternating between the left-back and left winger position.

For the 2008–09 season, he was installed in the left winger role permanently. He scored his first goal in just the second match of the season in a 1–3 loss to Le Mans. Two weeks later, he scored in the club's 2–1 win over Bordeaux and, a week later, scored again, this time in a 1–1 draw with Sochaux, he also scored in a 2–2 draw against Lyon.

From 11 November 2008 onwards, Bastos scored in five straight matches. He scored goals against Marseille, Lorient, Toulouse, Nice, and Le Havre. Lille accumulated two wins and three draws in that span. Several weeks later, he began another streak scoring a goal in six straight matches. With Lille winning all of those matches, they moved into the European places in the standings and eventually finished fifth earning a UEFA Cup spot on the final day of the season. In total that season, Michel appeared in 41 matches and scored 16 goals, 14 in the league and also assisted on nine goals, which led Ligue 1. He was awarded the Trophée du Meilleur Passeur and became the only player in Ligue 1 history to appear in the top five of both the goalscorers' table and the assists' table since the creation of the assists' table for the 2007–08 season. He was also nominated for the Ligue 1 Player of the Year Award and named to the league's Team of the Year.

=== Lyon ===
Bastos with Lyon

On 15 July 2009, Lille president Michel Seydoux revealed that the club had accepted an €18 million offer from Lyon. On 16 July, Bastos successfully passed his medical and agreed to a four-year contract making him Lyon's second signing of the summer following Argentine Lisandro López. He was presented to the media, along with fellow new signing Aly Cissokho, on 20 July and was assigned the number 7 shirt. Michel scored his first goal for Lyon in the first leg of the club's playoff round match against Anderlecht in the UEFA Champions League. In the club's 5–1 victory, he scored the third goal, coming in from the right side and unleashing a left-footed strike into the top left corner. On 21 February 2010, Bastos scored a 21-minute hat-trick against Sochaux, as Lyon won the match 4–0 to move into the Champions League spots.

Bastos acquired French nationality by naturalization in 2011.

Despite constant speculation linking Bastos with clubs around Europe, he remained an integral part of Lyon's first team, featuring regularly in Champions League, Coupe de France and Ligue 1 fixtures. He netted the only goal of the game against local rivals Saint-Étienne on 9 December 2012, smashing in a 25-yard free-kick, to keep Lyon at the top of Ligue 1 with a five-point gap over PSG.

==== Loan to Schalke 04 ====
On 29 January 2013, Bastos joined German side Schalke 04 on loan until the end of the 2013-2014 season, with option to sign him outright. He was given the number 9 shirt. Bastos made his Schalke debut on 2 February against Greuther Fürth and opened the scoring two minutes after half-time, but Schalke fell to a 2–1 defeat. In his third game in the 2012–13 Bundesliga, Bastos bagged a brace as Schalke twice came from behind to secure a 2–2 draw with Mainz on 16 February.

=== Al Ain ===
Schalke did not exercise the option to sign Bastos on a permanent basis, and on 5 August 2013 Bastos was sold to a UAE club Al Ain for €4 million.

==== Loan to Roma ====
On 20 January 2014, Italian side Roma announced that Bastos had signed a loan contract until the end of the season for a fee of €1.1 million, with the option of buying the full rights at the beginning of the 2014–15 season, for €3.5 million.

=== São Paulo ===
On 13 August 2014, Bastos returned to his homeland and signed a one-and-a-half-year deal with Brasileirão club São Paulo.

On 28 December 2016, Bastos and São Paulo, under a mutual agreement, cancel the contract, that would run until December 2017.

=== Palmeiras ===
On 31 December 2016, Bastos and Palmeiras signed a contract until 2018, with a one more year option. Bastos is the fifth signing of Verdão to 2017 season.

==== Loan to Sport Recife ====
On 30 April 2018, Sport Recife announced that Bastos had signed a loan contract until the end of the season.

=== América Minerio ===
On 27 May 2019, América Mineiro announced the signing of Bastos until the end of the season. However on 12 September 2019 the club and player announced the friendly termination of the contract. On 8 October 2019, he announced his retirement from professional football.

== International career ==
Prior to joining Lyon, Bastos had never been called up to the Seleção. Bastos cited his move to Lyon as an important factor in attempting to earn a spot on Brazil's 2010 FIFA World Cup team. On 27 October 2009, Bastos was selected, for the very first time, by the national team for friendly matches against England and Oman. He made his national team debut in the England match starting in the left back position. Bastos later started in the same position in Brazil's next two friendly matches against Oman and the Republic of Ireland in February 2010 and, on 11 May 2010, was subsequently named to the 23-man squad to participate in the 2010 FIFA World Cup.

== Career statistics ==
=== Club ===
Appearances and goals by club, season and competition
Club	Season	League			National cup (Note: Includes Copa do Brasil, Coupe de France, UAE President's Cup, Coppa Italia)		League cup (Note: Includes Coupe de la Ligue, UAE League Cup)		Continental		State league (Note: Includes Campeonato Paulista)		Total	
Club	Season	Division	Apps	Goals	Apps	Goals	Apps	Goals	Apps	Goals	Apps	Goals	Apps	Goals
Feyenoord	2001–02	Eredivisie	0	0	0	0	–		–		–		0	0
Excelsior (loan)	2002–03	Eredivisie	28	0	0	0	–		–		–		28	0
Atlético Paranaense	2003	Série A	2	0	0	0	–		–				2	0
Atlético Paranaense	2004	Série A	8	0	0	0	–		–				8	0
Atlético Paranaense	Total		10	0	0	0	–		–				10	0
Grêmio (loan)	2005	Série B	19	4	0	0	–		–				19	4
Figueirense (loan)	2005	Série A	34	10	0	0	–		–				34	10
Lille	2006–07	Ligue 1	25	3	3	1	1	0	4 (Note: Appearances in UEFA Champions League)	0	–		33	4
Lille	2007–08	Ligue 1	35	8	2	0	1	0	–		–		38	8
Lille	2008–09	Ligue 1	37	14	3	2	1	0	–		–		41	16
Lille	Total		97	25	8	3	3	0	4	0	–		112	28
Lyon	2009–10	Ligue 1	32	10	2	2	2	0	11	3	–		47	15
Lyon	2010–11	Ligue 1	28	5	2	0	1	0	7	3	–		38	8
Lyon	2011–12	Ligue 1	26	6	5	0	4	1	8	0	–		43	7
Lyon	2012–13	Ligue 1	12	5	0	0	0	0	1 (Note: Appearance in UEFA Europa League)	0	–		13	5
Lyon	Total		98	26	9	2	7	1	27	6	–		141	35
Schalke 04 (loan)	2012–13	Bundesliga	14	4	0	0	–		2	1	–		16	5
Al Ain	2013–14	UAE Pro League	12	4	7	2	0	0	–		–		19	6
Roma (loan)	2013–14	Serie A	16	1	1	0	–		0	0	–		17	1
São Paulo	2014	Série A	19	1	0	0	–		8 (Note: Appearances in Copa Sudamericana)	3	0	0	27	4
São Paulo	2015	Série A	31	7	5	1	–		7 (Note: Appearances in Copa Libertadores)	2	12	3	55	13
São Paulo	2016	Série A	14	0	1	0	–		13	3	10	2	38	5
São Paulo	Total		64	8	6	1	–		28	8	22	5	120	22
Palmeiras	2017	Série A	17	0	0	0	–		7	0	13	2	37	2
Palmeiras	2018	Série A	0	0	0	0	–		–		6	0	6	0
Palmeiras	Total		17	0	0	0	–		7	0	19	2	43	2
Sport do Recife (loan)	2018	Série A	23	4	0	0	–		–		0	0	23	4
América (MG)	2019	Série B	1	0	0	0	–		–		0	0	1	0
Career total			433	86	31	8	10	1	68	15	41	7	583	117

=== International ===
Score and result list Brazil's goal tally first, score column indicates score after Bastos goal.

International goal scored by Michel Bastos
No.	Date	Venue	Opponent	Score	Result	Competition
1	2 June 2010	National Sports Stadium, Harare, Zimbabwe	Zimbabwe	3–0	Win	Friendly

== Honours ==
Lyon

- Coupe de France: 2011–12
- Trophée des Champions: 2012

Individual

- Ligue 1 Team of the Year: 2008–09
