= Daniel Correa Freitas =

Brazilian footballer (1994-2018)

Daniel Correa
Personal information
- Full name: Daniel Correa Freitas
- Date of birth: 24 January 1994
- Place of birth: Juiz de Fora, Brazil
- Date of death: 27 October 2018 (aged 24)
- Place of death: São José dos Pinhais, Brazil
- Height: 1.72 m (5 ft 8 in)
- Position: Attacking midfielder

Youth career
- 2007–2013: Cruzeiro
- 2013: Botafogo

Senior career*
Years	Team	Apps	(Gls)
2013–2014	Botafogo	14	(5)
2015–2018	São Paulo	8	(0)
2017	→ Coritiba (loan)	3	(0)
2018	→ Ponte Preta (loan)	0	(0)
2018	→ São Bento (loan)	2	(0)
Total		27	(8)
- * Club domestic league appearances and goals

Daniel Correa Freitas (24 January 1994 – 27 October 2018), known in his native Brazil as Daniel, was a Brazilian professional footballer who played as an attacking midfielder.

== Club career ==
=== Early career ===
Born in Juiz de Fora, Minas Gerais, Daniel Correa joined Cruzeiro's youth setup in 2007, aged 14. Released in 2013, he moved to Botafogo.

=== Botafogo ===
Daniel Correa made his Série A debut for Bota on 20 October 2013, coming on as a late substitute for Hyuri in a 2–2 draw against Vasco da Gama. He became a starter during the 2014 Campeonato Carioca, and scored his first goals on 10 May 2014, netting a hat-trick in a 6–0 home routing of Criciúma.

In September 2014, Daniel Correa suffered a knee injury which ended his season prematurely.

=== São Paulo ===
On 27 December 2014, despite being injured, Daniel Correa joined São Paulo on a three-year contract. He subsequently struggled with recurrent injuries, which limited his appearances for the club.

Daniel Correa was subsequently loaned to Coritiba, Ponte Preta and São Bento.

== Death ==
On 27 October 2018, Daniel Correa was found dead in São José dos Pinhais, Paraná. It was later revealed that he was murdered after attending a party in the city. He had been beaten and partially beheaded, and his genitals had been mutilated. Edison Brittes Junior confessed to the killing, alleging that Daniel Correa had tried to rape his wife.

== Career statistics ==
As of 18 June 2014

Appearances and goals by club, season and competition
Club	Season	State League		Série A		Copa do Brasil		CONMEBOL (Note: Including Copa Sudamericana and Copa Libertadores.)		Other		Total	
Club	Season	Apps	Goals	Apps	Goals	Apps	Goals	Apps	Goals	Apps	Goals	Apps	Goals
Botafogo	2013	0	0	1	0	0	0	0	0	0	0	1	0
Botafogo	2014	12	0	13	5	1	0	2	0	0	0	28	5
Botafogo	Total	12	0	14	5	1	0	2	0	0	0	29	5
São Paulo	2015	0	0	2	0	0	0	0	0	0	0	2	0
São Paulo	2016	7	0	0	0	0	0	0	0	0	0	7	0
São Paulo	Total	7	0	2	0	0	0	0	0	0	0	9	0
Total		19	0	16	5	1	0	2	0	0	0	38	5
