= Luiz Eduardo (footballer, born 1987) =

Brazilian footballer

Personal information
- Full name: Luiz Eduardo Rodrigues
- Date of birth: 21 March 1987 (age 39)
- Place of birth: Uberlândia, Brazil
- Height: 1.91 m (6 ft 3 in)
- Position: Centre back

Senior career*
Years	Team	Apps	(Gls)
2004–2006	Uberlândia	0	(0)
2007–2008	Campinas	0	(0)
2009	Metropolitano	0	(0)
2009	Guarani	0	(0)
2010	Santa Cruz	4	(0)
2011	Mogi Mirim	0	(0)
2011–2012	Atlético Mineiro	2	(0)
2013	XV de Piracicaba	0	(0)
2013–2014	São Caetano	21	(2)
2014	Bragantino	6	(0)
2014	Chongqing Lifan	14	(1)
2015	São Caetano	0	(0)
2015	São Paulo	6	(1)
- * Club domestic league appearances and goals as of 4 December 2015

Luiz Eduardo Rodrigues (born 21 March 1987) is a Brazilian retired professional footballer who played as a central defender.

== Honours ==
=== Club ===
Atlético Mineiro

- Campeonato Mineiro: 2012

Chongqing Lifan

- China League One: 2014
