= Léo (footballer, born 1990) =

Brazilian footballer

Personal information
- Full name: Leonardo da Silva Vieira
- Date of birth: 22 September 1990 (age 36)
- Place of birth: Suzano, Brazil
- Height: 1.93 m (6 ft 4 in)
- Position: Goalkeeper

Team information
- Current team: Bahia
- Number: 22

Youth career
- 2000–2004: Portuguesa
- 2004–2010: São Paulo

Senior career*
Years	Team	Apps	(Gls)
2010–2017	São Paulo	1	(0)
2014	→ Linense (loan)	1	(0)
2017	→ Paraná (loan)	14	(0)
2017–2020	Athletico Paranense	24	(0)
2018	→ Atlético Goianiense (loan)	2	(0)
2020–2022	Rio Ave	0	(0)
2023	Inter de Limeira	13	(0)
2023	Juventude	5	(0)
2024–2025	Chapecoense	66	(0)
2026–	Bahia	11	(0)

International career
2007	Brazil U17		
- * Club domestic league appearances and goals as of 21:24, 12 November 2026 (UTC)

Leonardo da Silva Vieira (born 22 September 1990), known as Léo Vieira or just Léo, is a Brazilian professional footballer who plays as a goalkeeper for Bahia.

== Honours ==
Athletico Paranense

- Campeonato Paranaense: 2018, 2019, 2020
- J.League Cup / Copa Sudamericana Championship: 2019
- Copa do Brasil: 2019

Rio Ave

- Liga Portugal 2: 2021–22
