= Bruno (footballer, born 1985) =

Brazilian footballer

Personal information
- Full name: Bruno Vieira do Nascimento
- Date of birth: 30 August 1985 (age 41)
- Place of birth: Campo Grande, Brazil
- Height: 1.78 m (5 ft 10 in)
- Position: Right back

Senior career*
Years	Team	Apps	(Gls)
2005–2006	Guarani-SC		
2006	RS Futebol		
2006–2010	Juventude	63	(4)
2009	→ Guarani (loan)	14	(1)
2010–2011	Figueirense	68	(0)
2012–2014	Fluminense	144	(4)
2015–2018	São Paulo	123	(0)
2018	→ Bahia (loan)	18	(0)
2019	Internacional	27	(0)
- * Club domestic league appearances and goals

Bruno Vieira do Nascimento (born 30 August 1985), simply known as Bruno, is a Brazilian former professional footballer who played as a right back.

== Honours ==
Fluminense

- Campeonato Brasileiro Série A: 2012
- Campeonato Carioca: 2012
- Taça Guanabara: 2012

São Paulo

- Florida Cup (soccer): 2017
