= Lucão (footballer, born 1996) =

Brazilian footballer

Personal information
- Full name: Lucas Cavalcante Silva Afonso
- Date of birth: 23 March 1996 (age 30)
- Place of birth: Brasília, Brazil
- Height: 1.87 m (6 ft 2 in)
- Position: Centre-back

Team information
- Current team: Chongqing Tonglianglong
- Number: 33

Youth career
- 2008–2014: São Paulo

Senior career*
Years	Team	Apps	(Gls)
2013–2019	São Paulo	64	(1)
2017–2018	→ Estoril (loan)	7	(0)
2019–2020	Goiás	4	(0)
2021	CSA	45	(4)
2022	Mirassol	8	(0)
2022	CSA	35	(1)
2023	Guarani	50	(0)
2024	OFI	8	(0)
2024–2025	América Mineiro	65	(2)
2026–	Chongqing Tonglianglong	29	(1)
- * Club domestic league appearances and goals as of 19 November 2026

Lucas Cavalcante Silva Afonso (born 23 March 1996), known as Lucão, is a Brazilian professional footballer who plays as a centre-back for Chongqing Tonglianglong.

== Career ==
Lucão made his Série A debut at 17 November 2013 against Fluminense in a 2–1 away defeat. He played the first half and was substituted at half time by Caramelo.

On 9 February 2024, Lucão joined Super League Greece club OFI, signing a contract until the end of the 2023–24 season.

On 2 February 2026, Lucão joined Chinese Super League club Chongqing Tonglianglong.

== Career statistics ==
As of match played 8 November 2026

Appearances and goals by club, season and competition
Club	Season	League			State League		Cup		Continental		Other		Total	
Club	Season	Division	Apps	Goals	Apps	Goals	Apps	Goals	Apps	Goals	Apps	Goals	Apps	Goals
São Paulo	2013	Série A	1	0	—		—		0	0	1	0	2	0
São Paulo	2014	Série A	9	1	1	0	1	1	4	0	—		15	2
São Paulo	2015	Série A	25	0	12	0	5	0	5	0	—		47	0
São Paulo	2016	Série A	3	0	4	0	0	0	3	0	—		10	0
São Paulo	2017	Série A	6	0	3	0	0	0	2	0	—		11	0
São Paulo	Total		44	1	20	0	6	1	14	0	1	0	85	2
Estoril (loan)	2017–18	Primeira Liga	7	0	1	0	—		—		0	0	8	0
Goiás	2019	Série A	1	0	—		—		—		—		1	0
Goiás	2020	Série A	0	0	3	0	1	0	0	0	—		4	0
Goiás	Total		1	0	3	0	1	0	0	0	—		5	0
CSA	2021	Série B	36	2	9	2	2	0	—		8	0	55	4
Mirassol	2022	Série C	—		8	0	2	0	—		—		10	0
CSA	2022	Série B	35	1	—		—		—		—		35	1
Guarani	2023	Série B	36	0	14	0	—		—		—		50	0
OFI	2023–24	Super League Greece	8	0	—		—		—		—		8	0
América Mineiro	2024	Série B	16	1	—		—		—		—		45	10
América Mineiro	2025	Série B	37	1	12	0	1	0	—		—		32	9
América Mineiro	Total		53	2	12	0	1	0	—		—		65	2
Chongqing Tonglianglong	2026	Chinese Super League	29	1	—		3	0	—		—		32	1
Career total			249	7	67	2	15	1	14	0	9	0	354	10

== Honours ==
CSA

- Campeonato Alagoano: 2021

Brazil U20

- Toulon Tournament: 2013
