= Wilder Guisao =

Colombian footballer (born 1991)

Personal information
- Full name: Wilder Andrés Guisao Correa
- Date of birth: 30 July 1991 (age 35)
- Place of birth: Apartadó, Colombia
- Height: 1.77 m (5 ft 10 in)
- Position: Winger

Team information
- Current team: Jaguares de Córdoba
- Number: 14

Senior career*
Years	Team	Apps	(Gls)
2011	Bogotá	31	(11)
2012–2014	Atlético Nacional	68	(10)
2015–2017	Toluca	14	(4)
2015–2016	→ São Paulo (loan)	7	(1)
2016	→ Racing (loan)	4	(0)
2017	→ Chiapas (loan)	0	(0)
2019	Cúcuta	11	(0)
2020–2021	Jaguares de Córdoba	53	(3)
2022	Envigado	22	(1)
2022	Cortuluá	12	(1)
2023–	Unión Magdalena	18	(3)
- * Club domestic league appearances and goals as of 18 August 2023

Wilder Andrés Guisao Correa (born 30 July 1991) is a Colombian professional footballer who plays as a right winger for Unión Magdalena.

== Honours ==
Atlético Nacional

- Categoría Primera A (3): 2013–I, 2013–II, 2014–I
- Copa Colombia (2): 2012, 2013
- Superliga Colombiana (1): 2012
