= 2013 Suruga Bank Championship =

2013 スルガ銀行チャンピオンシップ 2013 Copa Suruga Bank
Kashima Antlers	São Paulo
(Japan)	(Brazil)
3	2
- Date: August 7, 2013
- Venue: Kashima Soccer Stadium, Kashima
- Referee: Abdul Malik Abdul Bashir (Singapore)
- Attendance: 26,202
- Weather: Cloudy; 27.1 °C (80.8 °F); 82% humidity

The 2013 Suruga Bank Championship (Japanese: スルガ銀行チャンピオンシップ2013; Spanish: Copa Suruga Bank 2013) was the sixth edition of the Suruga Bank Championship, the club football match co-organized by the Japan Football Association, the football governing body of Japan, CONMEBOL, the football governing body of South America, and J. League, the professional football league of Japan, between the winners of the previous season's J. League Cup and Copa Sudamericana.

The match was contested between Japanese team Kashima Antlers, the 2012 J. League Cup champion, and Brazilian team São Paulo, the 2012 Copa Sudamericana champion. It was hosted by Kashima Antlers at the Kashima Soccer Stadium in Kashima on August 7, 2013. It was São Paulo's first appearance at the Suruga Bank Championship, while Kashima Antlers were the champions from the previous edition of the championship.

Kashima Antlers won 3–2 with Yuya Osako scoring a hat-trick, to win their second Suruga Bank Championship title in a row.

== Qualified teams ==
Team	Qualification	Previous appearances (bold indicates winners)
(Japan) Kashima Antlers	2012 J. League Cup champion	**2012**
(Brazil) São Paulo	2012 Copa Sudamericana champion	None

== Format ==
The Suruga Bank Championship was played as a single match, with the J. League Cup champion hosting the match. If the score was tied at the end of regulation, the penalty shoot-out was used to determine the winner (no extra time was played). A maximum of seven substitutions may be made during the match.

== Match details ==
August 7, 2013
19:00 UTC+9

Kashima Antlers (Japan)	3–2	(Brazil) São Paulo
Osako 25', 39', 90+2'	Report	Ganso 58'; Aloísio 75'

Kashima Soccer Stadium, Kashima
Attendance: 26,202
Referee: Abdul Malik Abdul Bashir (Singapore)

**Kashima Antlers**	**São Paulo**

GK	21	(Japan) Hitoshi Sogahata
DF	22	(Japan) Daigo Nishi
DF	4	(Japan) Kazuya Yamamura
DF	5	(Japan) Takeshi Aoki		(substituted off) 85'
DF	17	(Japan) Takanori Maeno		(substituted off) 78'
MF	20	(Japan) Gaku Shibasaki
MF	40	(Japan) Mitsuo Ogasawara (c)	(yellow card) 56'
MF	25	(Japan) Yasushi Endo		(substituted off) 68'
MF	28	(Japan) Shoma Doi		(substituted off) 57'
MF	8	(Brazil) Juninho		(substituted off) 85'
FW	9	(Japan) Yuya Osako
Substitutes:
GK	1	(Japan) Akihiro Sato
DF	3	(Japan) Daiki Iwamasa	(yellow card) 87'	(substituted on) 85'
DF	6	(Japan) Kōji Nakata		(substituted on) 78'
MF	13	(Japan) Atsutaka Nakamura		(substituted on) 68'
MF	27	(Japan) Takahide Umebachi		(substituted on) 85'
MF	35	(Japan) Takuya Nozawa		(substituted on) 57'
FW	19	(Japan) Yuta Toyokawa
Manager:
(Brazil) Toninho Cerezo

GK	01	(Brazil) Rogério Ceni (c)
DF	23	(Brazil) Douglas
DF	33	(Brazil) Lucão	(substituted off) 73'
DF	14	(Brazil) Edson Silva
DF	38	(Brazil) Reinaldo
MF	5	(Brazil) Wellington
MF	7	(Brazil) Rodrigo Caio
MF	18	(Brazil) Maicon	(substituted off) 46'
MF	8	(Brazil) Ganso
FW	11	(Brazil) Ademilson	(substituted off) 46'
FW	19	(Brazil) Aloísio
Substitutes:
GK	12	(Brazil) Denis
GK	30	(Brazil) Renan Ribeiro
DF	27	(Brazil) Lucas Farias
MF	20	(Brazil) Lucas Evangelista	(substituted on) 46'
MF	21	(Brazil) Roni	(substituted on) 73'
MF	28	(Brazil) João Schmidt
FW	22	(Brazil) Silvinho	(substituted on) 46'
Manager:
(Brazil) Paulo Autuori

Assistant referees:
Goh Gek Pheng (Singapore)
Lee Tzu Liang (Singapore)
Fourth official:
Jumpei Iida (Japan)

2013 Suruga Bank Championship winners
(Japan)
Kashima Antlers
Second title
