= 2013 São Paulo FC season =

São Paulo
2013 season
- Chairman: Juvenal Juvêncio
- Manager: Ney Franco (until 5 July); Milton Cruz (caretaker manager); Paulo Autuori (until 9 September); Muricy Ramalho
- Stadium: Estádio do Morumbi
- Série A: 9th
- Campeonato Paulista: Semi-finals
- Copa Libertadores: Round of 16
- Recopa Sudamericana: Runners-up
- Suruga Bank Championship: Runners-up
- Copa Sudamericana: Semi-finals
- Top goalscorer: League: Aloísio (11 goals); All: Aloísio & Luís Fabiano (21 each)
- Highest home attendance: 57,401 (v Atlético Mineiro in the Copa Libertadores)
- Lowest home attendance: 4,579 (v Bahia in the Campeonato Brasileiro)
Home colours	Away colours

The 2013 season marked São Paulo's 84th year since the club's existence. Playing in the Campeonato Paulista, the club reached the semi-finals, before being eliminated in a penalty shoot-out after a 0-0 (3-4) against Corinthians. São Paulo participated in the continental tournament, Copa Libertadores, returning to the most important South American competition following a two-year absence, in a spot by the title of Copa Sudamericana won in the previous year and by the qualifying group of national league with a 4th position reached in the end of competition. Due to the continental title of Copa Sudamericana, the team was enabled to dispute of Recopa Sudamericana (against the winner of Copa Libertadores and rival Corinthians) and Suruga Bank Championship (playing against 2012 J. League Cup champion Kashima Antlers). In the first opportunity of title by the Recopa Sudamericana the Tricolor was defeated by rival with a two-legs lost (1–2 home; 0–2 away). Before long the club went to Japan to compete the Suruga Bank Championship and over again was defeated by opponent in a single match result: 2–3. In participation of Copa Libertadores the team advanced the first and second stages but was eliminated on the round of 16 by the club which would be champion that year, Atlético Mineiro, with two negative results (1–2 home; 1–4 away). In the second half of the year, São Paulo had hard times with an historical winless sequence of 14 matches (12 by official competitions) being only closed in a friendly match against Benfica just after 2 months and hand an official victory against Fluminense 2 weeks later by the Campeonato Brasileiro. Due to the negative campaign Tricolor remained on the relegated group for 11 rounds achieving the 9th position on the end of season by recovery at the second half of championship after the return of notable coach Muricy Ramalho who trained São Paulo in two previous opportunities reaching 4 titles including an historical sequence of 3 titles in national league. After Muricy Ramalho's arrival the team improved the average of points earned, reaching the fourth position in second half of league. In the end of season São Paulo play the Copa Sudamericana by defend of the title won in the previous edition, however the team was defeated in semi-finals by another paulista club Ponte Preta with (1-3 home; 1–1 away).

== Players ==
=== Current squad ===
Note: Flags indicate national team as defined under FIFA eligibility rules; some limited exceptions apply. Players may hold more than one non-FIFA nationality.

No.	Pos.	Nation	Player
01	GK	BRA	Rogério Ceni (captain)
2	DF	BRA	Rafael Toloi
3	DF	BRA	Roger Carvalho (on loan from Tombense)
4	DF	BRA	Antônio Carlos
5	MF	BRA	Wellington (vice-captain)
6	DF	ARG	Clemente Rodríguez
7	MF	BRA	Rodrigo Caio
8	MF	BRA	Ganso
9	FW	BRA	Luís Fabiano
10	MF	BRA	Jádson
11	FW	BRA	Ademilson
12	GK	BRA	Denis
13	DF	BRA	Paulo Miranda
14	DF	BRA	Edson Silva
15	MF	BRA	Denílson
16	DF	BRA	Carleto
17	FW	BRA	Osvaldo

No.	Pos.	Nation	Player
18	MF	BRA	Maicon
19	FW	BRA	Aloísio (on loan from Tombense)
20	MF	BRA	Lucas Evangelista
22	FW	BRA	Silvinho
23	DF	BRA	Douglas
24	GK	BRA	Léo
25	MF	BRA	Fabrício
27	DF	BRA	Lucas Farias
28	MF	BRA	João Schmidt
29	FW	BRA	Negueba (on loan from Flamengo)
30	GK	BRA	Renan Ribeiro
32	DF	BRA	Mateus Caramelo
33	DF	BRA	Lucas Silva
34	DF	BRA	Diego
35	MF	BRA	Allan
37	FW	BRA	Welliton (on loan from Spartak Moscow)
38	DF	BRA	Reinaldo (on loan from Penapolense)

Removed from the first squad

Note: Flags indicate national team as defined under FIFA eligibility rules; some limited exceptions apply. Players may hold more than one non-FIFA nationality.

No.	Pos.	Nation	Player
—	DF	BRA	Lúcio

=== Out on loan ===
Note: Flags indicate national team as defined under FIFA eligibility rules; some limited exceptions apply. Players may hold more than one non-FIFA nationality.

No.	Pos.	Nation	Player
—	DF	BRA	Luiz Paulo (on loan to Oeste) Until May 20
—	MF	BRA	Zé Vitor (on loan to São Caetano) Until December 31
—	MF	BRA	Régis (on loan to Paulista) Until May 21
—	FW	BRA	Roni (on loan to Sagan Tosu)Until December 31
—	FW	BRA	Mazola (on loan to Hangzhou Greentown) Until December 31
22	MF	BRA	Casemiro (on loan to Real Madrid B) Until June 30
26	DF	BRA	Henrique Miranda (on loan to Figueirense) Until December 31
20	MF	ARG	Marcelo Cañete (on loan to Portuguesa) Until December 31
21	DF	BRA	João Filipe (on loan to Náutico) Until December 31
34	DF	BRA	Luiz Eduardo (on loan to Náutico) Until December 31
6	DF	BRA	Cortez (on loan to Benfica) Until June 2014
4	DF	BRA	Rhodolfo (on loan to Grêmio) Until July 2014
21	MF	BRA	Roni (on loan to Goiás) Until December 31
36	MF	BRA	Régis (on loan to América-RN) Until December 31

=== Transfers ===
==== In ====
Note: Flags indicate national team as defined under FIFA eligibility rules; some limited exceptions apply. Players may hold more than one non-FIFA nationality.

No.	Pos.	Nation	Player
29	FW	BRA	Negueba (on loan from Flamengo)
19	FW	BRA	Aloísio (from Figueirense)
16	DF	BRA	Carleto (loan return from Fluminense)
3	DF	BRA	Lúcio (from Juventus)
29	FW	BRA	Wallyson (from Cruzeiro)
22	FW	BRA	Silvinho (from Penapolense)
26	DF	BRA	Juan (loan return from Santos)
32	DF	BRA	Mateus Caramelo (from Mogi Mirim)
21	MF	BRA	Roni (from Mogi Mirim)
36	MF	BRA	Régis (loan return from Paulista)
30	GK	BRA	Renan Ribeiro (from Atlético Mineiro)
38	DF	BRA	Reinaldo (on loan from Penapolense)
6	DF	ARG	Clemente Rodríguez (from Boca Juniors)
4	DF	BRA	Antônio Carlos (from Botafogo)
37	FW	BRA	Welliton (on loan from Spartak Moscow)
3	DF	BRA	Roger Carvalho (on loan from Tombense)

==== Out ====
Note: Flags indicate national team as defined under FIFA eligibility rules; some limited exceptions apply. Players may hold more than one non-FIFA nationality.

No.	Pos.	Nation	Player
—	FW	BRA	Lucas (to Paris Saint-Germain)
—	FW	BRA	Willian José (to Grêmio)
—	MF	BRA	Paulo Assunção (to Deportivo La Coruña)
—	MF	BRA	Cícero (to Santos)
—	FW	BRA	Henrique (to Botafogo)
38	FW	BRA	Tiago (return to Rio Branco-ES)
29	FW	BRA	Wallyson (to Bahia)
26	DF	BRA	Juan (to Vitória)

== Statistics ==
=== Appearances and goals ===
No.	Pos	Nat	Player	Total		Campeonato Paulista		Copa Libertadores		Campeonato Brasileiro		Others		Copa Sudamericana	
No.	Pos	Nat	Player	Apps	Goals	Apps	Goals	Apps	Goals	Apps	Goals	Apps	Goals	Apps	Goals
01	GK	(Brazil)	Rogério Ceni	67	6	13+0	1	10+0	3	35+0	2	3+0	0	6+0	0
2	DF	(Brazil)	Rafael Toloi	40	1	13+1	1	7+0	0	15+0	0	2+0	0	2+0	0
3	DF	(Brazil)	Roger Carvalho	0	0	0+0	0	0+0	0	0+0	0	0+0	0	0+0	0
4	DF	(Brazil)	Antônio Carlos	21	5	0+0	0	0+0	0	15+1	3	0+0	0	5+0	2
5	MF	(Brazil)	Wellington	61	0	12+3	0	8+1	0	22+7	0	2+1	0	1+4	0
6	DF	(Argentina)	Clemente Rodríguez	3	0	0+0	0	0+0	0	3+0	0	0+0	0	0+0	0
7	MF	(Brazil)	Rodrigo Caio	58	4	9+2	1	1+2	0	36+0	3	3+0	0	5+0	0
8	MF	(Brazil)	PH Ganso	63	5	14+2	2	4+5	0	28+3	1	3+0	1	4+0	1
9	FW	(Brazil)	Luís Fabiano	50	21	13+0	8	6+0	5	23+1	6	2+0	0	3+2	2
10	MF	(Brazil)	Jádson	48	11	13+1	5	9+0	4	19+2	1	1+0	0	2+1	1
11	FW	(Brazil)	Ademilson	39	6	7+2	2	0+3	1	13+8	2	1+0	0	3+2	1
12	GK	(Brazil)	Denis	11	0	8+0	0	0+0	0	3+0	0	0+0	0	0+0	0
13	DF	(Brazil)	Paulo Miranda	47	0	7+2	0	6+0	0	24+2	0	0+0	0	6+0	0
14	DF	(Brazil)	Edson Silva	27	1	10+2	1	3+0	0	10+0	0	1+0	0	1+0	0
15	MF	(Brazil)	Denílson	45	0	12+0	0	9+0	0	17+0	0	2+0	0	5+0	0
16	DF	(Brazil)	Carleto	19	1	11+1	0	4+0	0	3+0	1	0+0	0	0+0	0
17	FW	(Brazil)	Osvaldo	50	5	10+1	2	9+0	3	20+6	0	2+0	0	0+2	0
18	MF	(Brazil)	Maicon	50	1	9+2	1	1+4	0	16+10	0	1+1	0	6+0	0
19	FW	(Brazil)	Aloísio	66	21	6+9	4	7+2	2	17+16	11	1+2	2	6+0	2
20	MF	(Brazil)	Lucas Evangelista	23	1	0+0	0	0+0	0	8+11	1	0+2	0	1+1	0
22	FW	(Brazil)	Silvinho	8	0	0+0	0	0+1	0	2+4	0	0+1	0	0+0	0
23	DF	(Brazil)	Douglas	58	1	9+6	0	8+1	0	25+1	1	3+0	0	5+0	0
24	GK	(Brazil)	Léo	0	0	0+0	0	0+0	0	0+0	0	0+0	0	0+0	0
25	MF	(Brazil)	Fabrício	28	0	6+3	0	1+2	0	9+6	0	0+0	0	0+1	0
27	DF	(Brazil)	Lucas Farias	7	0	1+4	0	0+0	0	2+0	0	0+0	0	0+0	0
28	MF	(Brazil)	João Schmidt	7	0	1+4	0	0+0	0	1+1	0	0+0	0	0+0	0
29	FW	(Brazil)	Negueba	5	0	0+0	0	0+0	0	1+4	0	0+0	0	0+0	0
30	GK	(Brazil)	Renan Ribeiro	0	0	0+0	0	0+0	0	0+0	0	0+0	0	0+0	0
32	DF	(Brazil)	Mateus Caramelo	3	0	0+0	0	0+0	0	1+2	0	0+0	0	0+0	0
33	DF	(Brazil)	Lucas Silva	2	0	0+0	0	0+0	0	1+0	0	1+0	0	0+0	0
34	DF	(Brazil)	Diego	0	0	0+0	0	0+0	0	0+0	0	0+0	0	0+0	0
35	MF	(Brazil)	Allan	0	0	0+0	0	0+0	0	0+0	0	0+0	0	0+0	0
37	FW	(Brazil)	Welliton	19	4	0+0	0	0+0	0	6+9	3	0+0	0	0+4	1
38	DF	(Brazil)	Reinaldo	32	2	0+0	0	0+0	0	26+0	2	1+0	0	5+0	0
39	FW	(Brazil)	Adelino	1	0	0+1	0	0+0	0	0+0	0	0+0	0	0+0	0
Players who are on loan/left São Paulo this season:
3	DF	(Brazil)	Lúcio	31	2	11+0	1	8+0	0	10+0	1	2+0	0	0+0	0
4	DF	(Brazil)	Rhodolfo	16	1	8+1	1	3+1	0	2+1	0	0+0	0	0+0	0
6	DF	(Brazil)	Cortez	17	0	10+1	0	6+0	0	0+0	0	0+0	0	0+0	0
20	MF	(Argentina)	Marcelo Cañete	17	1	8+5	1	0+4	0	0+0	0	0+0	0	0+0	0
21	DF	(Brazil)	João Filipe	2	0	2+0	0	0+0	0	0+0	0	0+0	0	0+0	0
21	MF	(Brazil)	Roni	5	0	0+0	0	0+0	0	1+3	0	0+1	0	0+0	0
22	MF	(Brazil)	Casemiro	3	0	1+0	0	0+2	0	0+0	0	0+0	0	0+0	0
26	DF	(Brazil)	Henrique Miranda	4	0	0+4	0	0+0	0	0+0	0	0+0	0	0+0	0
26	DF	(Brazil)	Juan	7	0	0+0	0	0+0	0	4+1	0	2+0	0	0+0	0
29	FW	(Brazil)	Wallyson	11	0	7+2	0	0+2	0	0+0	0	0+0	0	0+0	0
36	MF	(Brazil)	Régis	0	0	0+0	0	0+0	0	0+0	0	0+0	0	0+0	0
34	DF	(Brazil)	Luiz Eduardo	0	0	0+0	0	0+0	0	0+0	0	0+0	0	0+0	0
38	FW	(Brazil)	Tiago	1	0	0+1	0	0+0	0	0+0	0	0+0	0	0+0	0

=== Top scorers ===
Rank	Nat	Pos	Player	Campeonato Paulista	Copa Libertadores	Campeonato Brasileiro	Recopa	Copa Suruga	Copa Sudamericana	Total
1	(Brazil)	FW	Aloísio	4	2	11	1	1	2	21
=	(Brazil)	FW	Luís Fabiano	8	5	6	0	0	2	21
3	(Brazil)	MF	Jádson	5	4	1	0	0	1	11
4	(Brazil)	FW	Ademilson	2	1	2	0	0	1	6
=	(Brazil)	GK	Rogério Ceni	1	3	2	0	0	0	6
6	(Brazil)	DF	Antônio Carlos	0	0	3	0	0	2	5
=	(Brazil)	MF	Ganso	2	0	1	0	1	1	5
=	(Brazil)	FW	Osvaldo	2	3	0	0	0	0	5
9	(Brazil)	MF	Rodrigo Caio	1	0	3	0	0	0	4
=	(Brazil)	FW	Welliton	0	0	3	0	0	1	4
11	(Brazil)	DF	Lúcio	1	0	1	0	0	0	2
=	(Brazil)	DF	Reinaldo	0	0	2	0	0	0	2
13	(Argentina)	MF	Cañete	1	0	0	0	0	0	1
=	(Brazil)	DF	Carleto	0	0	1	0	0	0	1
=	(Brazil)	DF	Douglas	0	0	1	0	0	0	1
=	(Brazil)	DF	Edson Silva	1	0	0	0	0	0	1
=	(Brazil)	MF	Lucas Evangelista	0	0	1	0	0	0	1
=	(Brazil)	MF	Maicon	1	0	0	0	0	0	1
=	(Brazil)	DF	Rafael Toloi	1	0	0	0	0	0	1
=	(Brazil)	DF	Rhodolfo	1	0	0	0	0	0	1
				4	0	1	0	0	0	5
Total				35	18	39	1	2	10	105

=== Clean sheets ===
Includes all competitive matches. The list is sorted by shirt number when total clean sheets are equal.

Last updated on 13 November

Rank	Pos	No.	Player	Campeonato Paulista	Copa Libertadores	Campeonato Brasileiro	Recopa	Copa Suruga	Copa Sudamericana	Total
1	GK	01	(Brazil) Rogério Ceni	7	2	12	0	0	1	22
2	GK	12	(Brazil) Denis	2	0	2	0	0	0	4
TOTALS				9	2	14	0	0	1	26

=== Disciplinary record ===
Pos	Nat	No.	Player	Campeonato Paulista			Copa Libertadores			Campeonato Brasileiro			Recopa/Suruga			Copa Sudamericana			Total		
Pos	Nat	No.	Player	Booked	Double yellow card	Sent off (straight red)	Booked	Double yellow card	Sent off (straight red)	Booked	Double yellow card	Sent off (straight red)	Booked	Double yellow card	Sent off (straight red)	Booked	Double yellow card	Sent off (straight red)	Booked	Double yellow card	Sent off (straight red)
GK	(Brazil)	01	Rogério Ceni	2	0	0	0	0	0	3	0	0	0	0	0	0	0	0	5	0	0
DF	(Brazil)	2	Rafael Toloi	5	0	0	2	0	0	3	0	0	0	0	0	0	0	0	10	0	0
DF	(Brazil)	3	Roger Carvalho	0	0	0	0	0	0	0	0	0	0	0	0	0	0	0	0	0	0
DF	(Brazil)	4	Antônio Carlos	0	0	0	0	0	0	3	0	1	0	0	0	2	0	0	5	0	1
MF	(Brazil)	5	Wellington	4	0	0	3	0	0	9	1	0	1	0	0	3	0	0	20	1	0
DF	(Argentina)	6	Clemente Rodríguez	0	0	0	0	0	0	0	1	0	0	0	0	0	0	0	0	1	0
MF	(Brazil)	7	Rodrigo Caio	1	1	0	0	0	0	4	0	0	0	0	0	1	0	0	6	1	0
MF	(Brazil)	8	PH Ganso	3	0	0	2	0	0	3	0	0	1	0	0	0	0	1	9	0	1
FW	(Brazil)	9	Luís Fabiano	1	0	0	1	0	1	7	1	0	0	0	0	1	0	0	10	1	1
MF	(Brazil)	10	Jádson	2	0	0	4	0	0	4	0	0	1	0	0	0	0	0	11	0	0
FW	(Brazil)	11	Ademilson	0	0	0	0	0	0	1	0	0	0	0	0	0	0	0	1	0	0
GK	(Brazil)	12	Denis	0	0	0	0	0	0	0	0	0	0	0	0	0	0	0	0	0	0
DF	(Brazil)	13	Paulo Miranda	0	0	0	2	0	0	6	0	0	0	0	0	1	0	0	9	0	0
DF	(Brazil)	14	Edson Silva	1	0	0	0	0	0	1	1	0	0	0	0	1	0	0	3	1	0
MF	(Brazil)	15	Denílson	4	0	0	3	0	0	7	1	2	0	0	0	1	0	0	15	1	2
DF	(Brazil)	16	Carleto	3	0	1	0	0	1	0	0	0	0	0	0	0	0	0	3	0	2
FW	(Brazil)	17	Osvaldo	2	0	0	2	0	0	1	0	1	0	0	0	0	0	0	5	0	1
MF	(Brazil)	18	Maicon	1	0	1	1	0	0	6	0	1	0	0	0	1	0	0	9	0	2
FW	(Brazil)	19	Aloísio	0	1	0	1	0	0	8	0	0	0	0	0	0	0	0	9	1	0
MF	(Brazil)	20	Lucas Evangelista	0	0	0	0	0	0	2	0	0	0	0	0	0	0	0	2	0	0
FW	(Brazil)	22	Silvinho	0	0	0	0	0	0	0	0	0	0	0	0	0	0	0	0	0	0
DF	(Brazil)	23	Douglas	3	0	0	1	0	0	6	0	0	1	0	0	2	0	0	13	0	0
GK	(Brazil)	24	Léo	0	0	0	0	0	0	0	0	0	0	0	0	0	0	0	0	0	0
MF	(Brazil)	25	Fabrício	2	0	0	1	0	0	1	0	0	0	0	0	0	0	0	4	0	0
DF	(Brazil)	27	Lucas Farias	0	0	0	0	0	0	0	0	0	0	0	0	0	0	0	0	0	0
MF	(Brazil)	28	João Schmidt	0	0	0	0	0	0	0	0	0	0	0	0	0	0	0	0	0	0
FW	(Brazil)	29	Negueba	0	0	0	0	0	0	0	0	0	0	0	0	0	0	0	0	0	0
GK	(Brazil)	30	Renan Ribeiro	0	0	0	0	0	0	0	0	0	0	0	0	0	0	0	0	0	0
DF	(Brazil)	32	Mateus Caramelo	0	0	0	0	0	0	2	0	0	0	0	0	0	0	0	2	0	0
DF	(Brazil)	33	Lucas Silva	0	0	0	0	0	0	0	0	0	0	0	0	0	0	0	0	0	0
DF	(Brazil)	34	Diego	0	0	0	0	0	0	0	0	0	0	0	0	0	0	0	0	0	0
MF	(Brazil)	35	Allan	0	0	0	0	0	0	0	0	0	0	0	0	0	0	0	0	0	0
FW	(Brazil)	37	Welliton	0	0	0	0	0	0	0	0	0	0	0	0	0	0	0	0	0	0
DF	(Brazil)	38	Reinaldo	0	0	0	0	0	0	2	0	0	0	0	0	0	0	0	2	0	0
FW	(Brazil)	39	Adelino	0	0	0	0	0	0	0	0	0	0	0	0	0	0	0	0	0	0
Players who are on loan/left São Paulo this season:
DF	(Brazil)	3	Lúcio	3	0	1	1	1	0	2	0	0	0	0	0	0	0	0	6	1	1
DF	(Brazil)	4	Rhodolfo	3	0	0	1	0	0	0	0	0	0	0	0	0	0	0	4	0	0
DF	(Brazil)	6	Cortez	0	0	0	0	0	0	0	0	0	0	0	0	0	0	0	0	0	0
MF	(Argentina)	20	Marcelo Cañete	2	1	0	0	0	0	0	0	0	0	0	0	0	0	0	2	1	0
DF	(Brazil)	21	João Filipe	2	0	0	0	0	0	0	0	0	0	0	0	0	0	0	2	0	0
MF	(Brazil)	21	Roni	0	0	0	0	0	0	1	0	0	0	0	0	0	0	0	1	0	0
MF	(Brazil)	22	Casemiro	0	0	0	0	0	0	0	0	0	0	0	0	0	0	0	0	0	0
DF	(Brazil)	26	Henrique Miranda	0	0	0	0	0	0	0	0	0	0	0	0	0	0	0	0	0	0
DF	(Brazil)	26	Juan	0	0	0	0	0	0	1	0	0	1	0	0	0	0	0	2	0	0
FW	(Brazil)	29	Wallyson	0	0	0	0	0	0	0	0	0	0	0	0	0	0	0	0	0	0
DF	(Brazil)	34	Luiz Eduardo	0	0	0	0	0	0	0	0	0	0	0	0	0	0	0	0	0	0
MF	(Brazil)	36	Régis	0	0	0	0	0	0	0	0	0	0	0	0	0	0	0	0	0	0
FW	(Brazil)	38	Tiago	0	0	0	0	0	0	0	0	0	0	0	0	0	0	0	0	0	0
			Total	44	3	3	25	1	2	83	5	5	5	0	0	13	0	1	170	9	11

Last updated: 8 December 2013
Source: Competitive matches
Ordered by (red card) , (second yellow card) and (yellow card)
(yellow card) = Number of bookings; (second yellow card) = Number of sending offs after a second yellow card; (red card) = Number of sending offs by a direct red card.

=== Captains ===
No.	P	Name	Country	No. games	Notes
01	GK	Rogério Ceni	(Brazil)	67	Club captain
3	DF	Lúcio	(Brazil)	4	Club vice captain
4	DF	Rhodolfo	(Brazil)	3	
5	MF	Wellington	(Brazil)	2	
2	DF	Rafael Toloi	(Brazil)	1	
25	MF	Fabrício	(Brazil)	1	

Last updated: 8 December 2013
Source: Competitive match reports.
Competitive matches only
Matches started as captain only
Country: FIFA nationality; No.: Squad number; P: Position; Name: Player name; No. Games: Number of games started as captain.

=== Managers performance ===
Name	Nationality	From	To	P	W	D	L	GF	GA	%
Ney Franco	Brazil	19 January	3 July	37	19	6	12	62	41	57%
Milton Cruz (caretaker)	Brazil	7 July	10 July	2	0	0	2	1	4	0%
Paulo Autuori	Brazil	14 July	8 September	14	2	4	8	10	20	24%
Muricy Ramalho	Brazil	12 September	8 December	25	12	5	8	32	28	55%

=== Overview ===
Games played	78 (21 Campeonato Paulista, 10 Copa Libertadores, 38 Campeonato Brasileiro, 2 Recopa, 1 Copa Suruga Bank, 6 Copa Sudamericana)
Games won	33 (14 Campeonato Paulista, 3 Copa Libertadores, 14 Campeonato Brasileiro, 0 Recopa, 0 Copa Suruga Bank, 2 Copa Sudamericana)
Games drawn	15 (3 Campeonato Paulista, 1 Copa Libertadores, 8 Campeonato Brasileiro, 0 Recopa, 0 Copa Suruga Bank, 3 Copa Sudamericana)
Games lost	30 (4 Campeonato Paulista, 6 Copa Libertadores, 16 Campeonato Brasileiro, 2 Recopa, 1 Copa Suruga Bank, 1 Copa Sudamericana)
Goals scored	105
Goals conceded	93
Goal difference	+12
Clean sheets	26 (9 Campeonato Paulista, 2 Copa Libertadores, 14 Campeonato Brasileiro, 1 Copa Sudamericana)
Yellow cards	170 (44 Campeonato Paulista, 25 Copa Libertadores, 83 Campeonato Brasileiro, 5 Recopa Sudamericana, 13 Copa Sudamericana)
Second yellow cards	9 (3 Campeonato Paulista, 1 Copa Libertadores, 5 Campeonato Brasileiro)
Red cards	11 (3 Campeonato Paulista, 2 Copa Libertadores, 5 Campeonato Brasileiro, 1 Copa Sudamericana)
Worst discipline	Wellington (20 (yellow card) , 1, 0 (red card) )
Best result	5–0 (H) v Bolívar - Copa Libertadores - 2013.01.23
Worst result	1–4 (A) v Atlético Mineiro - Copa Libertadores - 2013.05.08
Most appearances	Rogério Ceni (67)
Top scorer	Aloísio and Luís Fabiano (21)

Source: Competitions

== Friendlies ==
22 May National	Londrina	1–2	São Paulo	Londrina
19:15 UTC−03:00	Neílson 59'	Report (pt)	Luís Fabiano 18'; Roni 55'	Stadium: Estádio Municipal Jacy Scaff (Estádio do Café); Attendance: 12,859; Referee: Paulo Roberto Alves Junior

29 June National	Flamengo	1–0	São Paulo	Uberlândia
19:00 UTC−03:00	Marcelo Moreno 57'	Report (pt)		Stadium: Estádio Municipal João Havelange (Parque do Sabiá); Referee: Alício Pena Júnior

=== Audi Cup ===
31 July Semi-final	Bayern Munich (Germany)	2–0	(Brazil) São Paulo	Munich
15:15 UTC−03:00	Mandžukić 55'; Weiser 86'	Report		Stadium: Allianz Arena; Referee: Deniz Aytekin

1 August Third-place Play-off	Milan (Italy)	1–0	(Brazil) São Paulo	Munich
13:15 UTC−03:00	K. Boateng 55'	Report		Stadium: Allianz Arena; Referee: Günter Perl

=== Eusébio Cup ===
3 August Final	Benfica (Portugal)	0–2	(Brazil) São Paulo	Lisbon
15:45 UTC−03:00			Aloísio 53'; Rafael Toloi 63'	Stadium: Estádio do Sport Lisboa e Benfica (Luz); Attendance: 30,638; Referee: Duarte Gomes

== Competitions ==
=== Overall ===
Competition	Started round	Current position / round	Final position / round	First match	Last match
Campeonato Paulista	First stage	—	Semi-final	19 January 2013	5 May 2013
Copa Libertadores	First stage	—	Round of 16	23 January 2013	8 May 2013
Série A	—	—	9th	26 May 2013	8 December 2013
Recopa Sudamericana	Final	—	Runner-up	3 July 2013	17 July 2013
Suruga Bank Championship	Final	—	Runner-up	7 August 2013	
Copa Sudamericana	Round of 16	—	Semi-finals	26 September 2013	27 November 2013

Source: Competitions

=== Campeonato Paulista ===
==== Results summary ====
Overall								Home						Away					
Pld	W	D	L	GF	GA	GD	Pts	W	D	L	GF	GA	GD	W	D	L	GF	GA	GD
21	14	3	4	35	18	+17	45	7	3	2	17	8	+9	7	0	2	18	10	+8

==== First stage ====
19 January Round 1	São Paulo	2–0	Mirassol	São Paulo
17:00 UTC−02:00	Luís Fabiano 12'; Jádson 81'	Report (pt)		Stadium: Estádio Cícero Pompeu de Toledo (Morumbi); Attendance: 14,783; Referee: Raphael Claus

26 January Round 3	São Paulo	2–1	Atlético Sorocaba	São Paulo
17:00 UTC−02:00	Ganso 30'; Cañete 76'	Report (pt)	Fábio Sanches 83'	Stadium: Estádio Cícero Pompeu de Toledo (Morumbi); Attendance: 6,966; Referee: Aurélio Santanna Martins

3 February Round 5	Santos	3–1	São Paulo	Santos
17:00 UTC−02:00	Miralles 38', 69'; Neymar 48' (pen.)	Report (pt)	Jádson 64'	Stadium: Estádio Urbano Caldeira (Vila Belmiro); Attendance: 14,283; Referee: Flávio Rodrigues Guerra

6 February Round 6	São Paulo	0–0	Ponte Preta	São Paulo
22:00 UTC−02:00		Report (pt)		Stadium: Estádio Cícero Pompeu de Toledo (Morumbi); Attendance: 5,685; Referee: José Claudio Rocha Filho

9 February Round 7	Guarani	1–2	São Paulo	Campinas
16:20 UTC−02:00	Thiago Gentil 46'	Report (pt)	Aloísio 32'; Rogério Ceni 50'	Stadium: Estádio Brinco de Ouro da Princesa; Attendance: 4,736; Referee: Luiz Vanderlei Martinucho

16 February Round 8	São Paulo	3–2	Ituano	São Paulo
19:30 UTC−02:00	Osvaldo 18'; Jádson 49'; Ganso 88'	Report (pt)	Kleiton Domingues 30'; Adaílton 72'	Stadium: Estádio Cícero Pompeu de Toledo (Morumbi); Attendance: 8,930; Referee: Adriano de Assis Miranda

20 February Round 2	São Caetano	2–4	São Paulo	São Caetano do Sul
19:30 UTC−03:00	Danielzinho 24'; Jóbson 26'	Report (pt)	Luís Fabiano 13', 73'; Maicon 45'; Aloísio 90+2'	Stadium: Estádio Anacleto Campanella; Attendance: 9,215; Referee: José Claúdio Rocha Filho

23 February Round 9	São Paulo	3–0	Linense	São Paulo
18:30 UTC−03:00	Jádson 32'; Osvaldo 61'; Fábio Lima 77' (o.g.)	Report (pt)		Stadium: Estádio Cícero Pompeu de Toledo (Morumbi); Attendance: 10,470; Referee: Rodrigo Braghetto

3 March Round 10	Penapolense	0–2	São Paulo	Penápolis
18:30 UTC−03:00		Report (pt)	Rhodolfo 4'; Ademilson 68'	Stadium: Estádio Municipal Tenente Carriço (Tenentão); Attendance: 7,992; Referee: Fábio de Jesus Volpato Mendes

10 March Round 11	São Paulo	0–0	Palmeiras	São Paulo
16:00 UTC−03:00		Report (pt)		Stadium: Estádio Cícero Pompeu de Toledo (Morumbi); Attendance: 18,020; Referee: Leandro Bizzio Marinho

17 March Round 12	São Paulo	3–2	Oeste	São Paulo
16:00 UTC−03:00	Edson Silva 17'; Rafael Toloi 30'; Luís Fabiano 69'	Report (pt)	Ligger 45'; Wanderson 76'	Stadium: Estádio Cícero Pompeu de Toledo (Morumbi); Attendance: 7,881; Referee: Paulo César de Oliveira

20 March Round 13	São Bernardo	1–2	São Paulo	São Bernardo do Campo
22:00 UTC−03:00	Denílson 12' (o.g.)	Report (pt)	Luís Fabiano 14'; Rodrigo Caio 81'	Stadium: Estádio Primeiro de Maio; Attendance: 12,372; Referee: Raphael Claus

23 March Round 14	São Paulo	2–0	Bragantino	São Paulo
18:30 UTC−03:00	Preto 30' (o.g.); Luís Fabiano 43'	Report (pt)		Stadium: Estádio Cícero Pompeu de Toledo (Morumbi); Attendance: 9,254; Referee: Rodrigo Guarizo Ferreira do Amaral

27 March Round 15	Paulista	0–2	São Paulo	Jundiaí
22:00 UTC−03:00		Report (pt)	Luís Fabiano 26', 48'	Stadium: Estádio Doutor Jayme Pinheiro de Ulhôa Cintra; Attendance: 4,770; Referee: Luiz Flávio de Oliveira

31 March Round 16	São Paulo	1–2	Corinthians	São Paulo
16:00 UTC−03:00	Jádson 4'	Report (pt)	Danilo 41'; Pato 82' (pen.)	Stadium: Estádio Cícero Pompeu de Toledo (Morumbi); Attendance: 20,930; Referee: Leandro Bizzio Marinho

7 April Round 17	Botafogo	1–3	São Paulo	Ribeirão Preto
18:30 UTC−03:00	Dimba 90+1'	Report (pt)	Lúcio 73'; Aloísio 79'; Ademilson 84'	Stadium: Estádio Santa Cruz; Attendance: 14,680; Referee: Marcelo Aparecido Ribeiro de Souza

10 April Round 4	União Barbarense	1–2	São Paulo	Santa Bárbara d'Oeste
19:30 UTC−03:00	Cesinha 25'	Report (pt)	Aloísio 40'; Cesar 54' (o.g.)	Stadium: Estádio Antônio Lins Ribeiro Guimarães (Toca do Leão); Attendance: 4,430; Referee: Adriano de Assis Miranda

13 April Round 18	São Paulo	0–1	XV de Piracicaba	São Paulo
18:30 UTC−03:00		Report (pt)	Luiz Eduardo 55'	Stadium: Estádio Cícero Pompeu de Toledo (Morumbi); Attendance: 9,308; Referee: Rodrigo Guarizo do Amaral

21 April Round 19	Mogi Mirim	1–0	São Paulo	Mogi Mirim
16:00 UTC−03:00	Roger 40'	Report (pt)		Stadium: Estádio Romildo Vitor Gomes Ferreira (Romildão); Attendance: 5,979; Referee: Rodrigo Braghetto

==== Knockout stage ====
===== Quarter-final =====
28 April Single match	São Paulo	1–0	Penapolense	São Paulo
18:30 UTC−03:00	Jailton 71' (o.g.)	Report		Stadium: Estádio Cícero Pompeu de Toledo (Morumbi); Attendance: 32,995; Referee: Wilson Luiz Seneme

===== Semi-final =====
5 May Single match	São Paulo	0–0 (3–4 p)	Corinthians	São Paulo
16:00 UTC−03:00		Report		Stadium: Estádio Cícero Pompeu de Toledo (Morumbi); Attendance: 29,475; Referee: Antônio Rogério Batista do Prado
	Penalties
	Rogério Ceni (penalty scored); Rafael Toloi (penalty scored); Ganso (penalty missed); Jádson (penalty scored); Luís Fabiano (penalty missed)		(penalty scored) Douglas; (penalty scored) Romarinho; (penalty scored) Fábio Santos; (penalty missed) Alessandro; (penalty scored) Pato

=== Copa Libertadores ===
==== Results summary ====
Overall								Home						Away					
Pld	W	D	L	GF	GA	GD	Pts	W	D	L	GF	GA	GD	W	D	L	GF	GA	GD
10	3	1	6	18	18	0	10	3	1	1	11	4	+7	0	0	5	7	14	−7

==== First stage ====
23 January First leg	São Paulo (Brazil)	5–0	(Bolivia) Bolívar	São Paulo
22:00 UTC−02:00	Osvaldo 8'; Luís Fabiano 21', 45+2'; Jádson 60'; Rogério Ceni 63' (pen.)	Report (es)		Stadium: Estádio Cícero Pompeu de Toledo (Morumbi); Attendance: 41,838; Referee: Roberto Silvera (Uruguay)

30 January Second leg	Bolívar (Bolivia)	4–3 (4–8 agg.)	(Brazil) São Paulo	La Paz
22:00 UTC−02:00	Ferreira 38', 75' (pen.); Cabrera 59', 69'	Report (es)	Luís Fabiano 2'; Jádson 16'; Osvaldo 35'	Stadium: Estadio Hernando Siles; Referee: Wilmar Roldan (Colombia)

==== Group stage ====
Pos	Team	Pld	W	D	L	GF	GA	GD	Pts
1	(Brazil) Atlético Mineiro (A)	6	5	0	1	16	9	+7	15
2	(Brazil) São Paulo (A)	6	2	1	3	8	8	0	7
3	(Argentina) Arsenal	6	2	1	3	10	15	−5	7
4	(Bolivia) The Strongest	6	2	0	4	8	10	−2	6

Source: RSSSF
(A) Advanced to the round of 16

13 February 1	Atlético Mineiro (Brazil)	2–1	(Brazil) São Paulo	Belo Horizonte
22:00 UTC−02:00	Jô 13'; Réver 72'	Report (es)	Aloísio 82'	Stadium: Estádio Raimundo Sampaio (Independência); Attendance: 18,187; Referee: Marcelo de Lima Henrique (Brazil)

28 February 2	São Paulo (Brazil)	2–1	(Bolivia) The Strongest	São Paulo
21:30 UTC−03:00	Osvaldo 42'; Luís Fabiano 80'	Report (es)	Barrera 21'	Stadium: Estádio Cícero Pompeu de Toledo (Morumbi); Attendance: 31,272; Referee: Enrique Cáceres (Paraguay)

7 March 3	São Paulo (Brazil)	1–1	(Argentina) Arsenal	São Paulo
19:15 UTC−03:00	Jádson 45+3'	Report (es)	Benedetto 49' (pen.)	Stadium: Estádio Municipal Paulo Machado de Carvalho (Pacaembu); Attendance: 25,814; Referee: Wilmar Roldán (Colombia)

14 March 4	Arsenal (Argentina)	2–1	(Brazil) São Paulo	Sarandí
21:30 UTC−03:00	Ortiz 66'; Braghieri 85'	Report (es)	Aloísio 72'	Stadium: Estadio Julio H. Grondona; Referee: Omar Ponce (Ecuador)

4 April 5	The Strongest (Bolivia)	2–1	(Brazil) São Paulo	La Paz
21:30 UTC−03:00	Solíz 15'; Cristaldo 66'	Report (es)	Rogério Ceni 44' (pen.)	Stadium: Estadio Hernando Siles; Attendance: 21,439; Referee: Víctor Carrillo (Peru)

17 April 6	São Paulo (Brazil)	2–0	(Brazil) Atlético Mineiro	São Paulo
22:00 UTC−03:00	Rogério Ceni 57' (pen.); Ademilson 82'	Report (es)		Stadium: Estádio Cícero Pompeu de Toledo (Morumbi); Attendance: 50,403; Referee: Wilton Sampaio (Brazil)

==== Knockout stage ====
===== Round of 16 =====
2 May First leg	São Paulo (Brazil)	1–2	(Brazil) Atlético Mineiro	São Paulo
20:15 UTC−03:00	Jádson 9'	Report	Ronaldinho 42'; Diego Tardelli 59'	Stadium: Estádio Cícero Pompeu de Toledo (Morumbi); Attendance: 57,401; Referee: Antonio Arias (Paraguay)

8 May Second leg	Atlético Mineiro (Brazil)	4–1 (6–2 agg.)	(Brazil) São Paulo	Belo Horizonte
22:00 UTC−03:00	Jô 18', 59', 66'; Diego Tardelli 61'	Report	Luís Fabiano 73'	Stadium: Estádio Raimundo Sampaio (Independência); Referee: Roberto Silvera (Uruguay)

=== Campeonato Brasileiro ===
==== Results summary ====
Overall								Home						Away					
Pld	W	D	L	GF	GA	GD	Pts	W	D	L	GF	GA	GD	W	D	L	GF	GA	GD
38	14	8	16	39	40	−1	50	8	3	8	23	20	+3	6	5	8	16	20	−4

==== Results by round ====
Round	1	2	3	4	5	6	11	7	8	12	9	13	14	15	16	17	10	18	19	20	21	22	23	24	25	26	27	28	29	30	31	32	33	34	35	36	37	38
Ground	A	H	A	H	A	H	H	A	H	H	A	A	H	A	H	A	A	H	A	H	A	H	A	H	A	H	A	H	H	A	A	H	A	H	A	H	A	H
Result	W	W	D	L	D	L	L	L	L	L	D	L	D	D	W	D	W	L	L	W	W	W	L	L	L	W	W	D	W	W	W	W	L	W	L	D	L	L
Position	3	1	1	3	6	9	10	14	16	16	18	19	19	19	18	19	17	18	18	18	16	14	15	16	17	16	16	15	12	10	9	8	8	8	8	9	9	9

Source: São Paulo FC.net
A = Away; H = Home; W = Win; D = Draw; L = Loss

==== Matches ====
26 May Round 1	Ponte Preta	0–2	São Paulo	Campinas
16:00 UTC−03:00		Report (pt)	Lúcio 8'; Jádson 44' (pen.)	Stadium: Estádio Moisés Lucarelli (Majestoso); Attendance: 6,267; Referee: Vinícius Furlan

29 May Round 2	São Paulo	5–1	Vasco da Gama	São Paulo
19:30 UTC−03:00	Luís Fabiano 60', 74'; Aloísio 68'; Carleto 72'; Luan 84' (o.g.)	Report (pt)	Dakson 82'	Stadium: Estádio Cícero Pompeu de Toledo (Morumbi); Attendance: 8,079; Referee: Márcio Chagas da Silva

2 June Round 3	Atlético Mineiro	0–0	São Paulo	Belo Horizonte
18:30 UTC−03:00		Report (pt)		Stadium: Estádio Raimundo Sampaio (Independência); Attendance: 10,830; Referee: Sandro Meira Ricci

5 June Round 4	São Paulo	0–1	Goiás	São Paulo
19:30 UTC−03:00		Report (pt)	Rodrigo 1'	Stadium: Estádio Cícero Pompeu de Toledo (Morumbi); Attendance: 8,892; Referee: Francisco Carlos do Nascimento

12 June Round 5	Grêmio	1–1	São Paulo	Porto Alegre
22:00 UTC−03:00	Kléber 86'	Report (pt)	Luís Fabiano 41'	Stadium: Arena do Grêmio; Attendance: 15,926; Referee: Pericles Bassols

7 July Round 6	São Paulo	0–2	Santos	São Paulo
16:00 UTC−03:00		Report (pt)	Giva 57'; Cícero 81'	Stadium: Estádio Cícero Pompeu de Toledo (Morumbi); Attendance: 11,819; Referee: Raphael Claus

10 July Round 11	São Paulo	1–2	Bahia	São Paulo
21:00 UTC−03:00	Aloísio 14'	Report (pt)	Talisca 63'; Fahel 87'	Stadium: Estádio Cícero Pompeu de Toledo (Morumbi); Attendance: 4,579; Referee: Alicio Pena Júnior
Note: The match was advanced due to São Paulo's participation in the 2013 Suruga Bank Championship.

14 July Round 7	Vitória	3–2	São Paulo	Salvador
16:00 UTC−03:00	Dinei 20'; Biancucchi 28', 55'	Report (pt)	Aloísio 9'; Rogério Ceni 35'	Stadium: Estádio Manoel Barradas (Barradão); Attendance: 11,227; Referee: Francisco Carlos do Nascimento

20 July Round 8	São Paulo	0–3	Cruzeiro	São Paulo
18:30 UTC−03:00		Report (pt)	Luan 51', 78', 81'	Stadium: Estádio Cícero Pompeu de Toledo (Morumbi); Attendance: 11,675; Referee: Héber Roberto Lopes

24 July Round 12	São Paulo	0–1	Internacional	São Paulo
21:00 UTC−03:00		Report (pt)	Leandro Damião 13'	Stadium: Estádio Cícero Pompeu de Toledo (Morumbi); Attendance: 6,275; Referee: André Luiz Castro
Note: The match was advanced due to São Paulo's participation in the 2013 Suruga Bank Championship.

28 July Round 9	Corinthians	0–0	São Paulo	São Paulo
16:00 UTC−03:00		Report (pt)		Stadium: Estádio Municipal Paulo Machado de Carvalho (Pacaembu); Attendance: 33,366; Referee: Rodrigo Guarizo do Amaral

11 August Round 13	Portuguesa	2–1	São Paulo	São Paulo
18:30 UTC−03:00	Diogo 37', 78'	Report (pt)	Lucas Evangelista 46'	Stadium: Estádio Oswaldo Teixeira Duarte (Canindé); Attendance: 8,593; Referee: Rodrigo Nunes de Sá

15 August Round 14	São Paulo	1–1	Atlético Paranaense	São Paulo
19:30 UTC−03:00	Rodrigo Caio 16'	Report (pt)	Paulo Baier 37' (pen.)	Stadium: Estádio Cícero Pompeu de Toledo (Morumbi); Attendance: 25,827; Referee: Anderson Daronco

18 August Round 15	Flamengo	0–0	São Paulo	Brasília
16:00 UTC−03:00		Report (pt)		Stadium: Estádio Nacional Mané Garrincha; Attendance: 44,164; Referee: Ricardo Marques Ribeiro

25 August Round 16	São Paulo	2–1	Fluminense	São Paulo
16:00 UTC−03:00	Luís Fabiano 27'; Reinaldo 45'	Report (pt)	Eduardo 90+1'	Stadium: Estádio Cícero Pompeu de Toledo (Morumbi); Attendance: 55,256; Referee: Jailson Macedo Freitas

1 September Round 17	Botafogo	0–0	São Paulo	Rio de Janeiro
16:00 UTC−03:00		Report (pt)		Stadium: Estádio Jornalista Mário Filho (Maracanã); Attendance: 23,585; Referee: Sandro Meira Ricci

3 September Round 10	Náutico	0–1	São Paulo	São Lourenço da Mata
21:00 UTC−03:00		Report (pt)	Aloísio 72'	Stadium: Itaipava Arena Pernambuco; Attendance: 12,217; Referee: Leandro Vuaden

5 September Round 18	São Paulo	1–2	Criciúma	São Paulo
21:00 UTC−03:00	Aloísio 68'	Report (pt)	Marcel 23' (pen.); Lins 41'	Stadium: Estádio Cícero Pompeu de Toledo (Morumbi); Attendance: 33,738; Referee: Wagner Reway

8 September Round 19	Coritiba	2–0	São Paulo	Curitiba
16:00 UTC−03:00	Alex 31', 45+1'	Report (pt)		Stadium: Estádio Major Antônio Couto Pereira; Attendance: 16,367; Referee: Alício Pena Júnior

12 September Round 20	São Paulo	1–0	Ponte Preta	São Paulo
21:00 UTC−03:00	Luís Fabiano 47'	Report (pt)		Stadium: Estádio Cícero Pompeu de Toledo (Morumbi); Attendance: 27,548; Referee: Marcelo Aparecido Ribeiro de Souza

15 September Round 21	Vasco da Gama	0–2	São Paulo	Rio de Janeiro
16:00 UTC−03:00		Report (pt)	Rodrigo Caio 30'; Antônio Carlos 69'	Stadium: Estádio Vasco da Gama (São Januário); Attendance: 7,815; Referee: Héber Roberto Lopes

18 September Round 22	São Paulo	1–0	Atlético Mineiro	São Paulo
21:50 UTC−03:00	Welliton 26'	Report (pt)		Stadium: Estádio Cícero Pompeu de Toledo (Morumbi); Attendance: 28,503; Referee: Leandro Vuaden

22 September Round 23	Goiás	1–0	São Paulo	Goiânia
16:00 UTC−03:00	Rodrigo 89'	Report (pt)		Stadium: Estádio do Governo do Estado de Goiás (Serra Dourada); Attendance: 24,789; Referee: Paulo Henrique de Godoy Bezerra

29 September Round 24	São Paulo	0–1	Grêmio	São Paulo
16:00 UTC−03:00		Report (pt)	Vargas 68'	Stadium: Estádio Cícero Pompeu de Toledo (Morumbi); Attendance: 41,140; Referee: Héber Roberto Lopes

2 October Round 25	Santos	3–0	São Paulo	Santos
21:50 UTC−03:00	Edu Dracena 22'; Thiago Ribeiro 59'; Léo 89'	Report		Stadium: Estádio Urbano Caldeira (Vila Belmiro); Attendance: 7,788; Referee: Ricardo Marques Ribeiro

5 October Round 26	São Paulo	3–2	Vitória	São Paulo
21:00 UTC−03:00	Antônio Carlos 4', 88'; Luís Fabiano 65'	Report (pt)	Juan 32' (pen.); Dinei 68'	Stadium: Estádio Cícero Pompeu de Toledo (Morumbi); Attendance: 22,285; Referee: Anderson Daronco

9 October Round 27	Cruzeiro	0–2	São Paulo	Belo Horizonte
21:50 UTC−03:00		Report (pt)	Douglas 77'; Reinaldo 80'	Stadium: Estádio Governador Magalhães Pinto (Mineirão); Attendance: 40,743; Referee: Jailson Macedo Freitas

13 October Round 28	São Paulo	0–0	Corinthians	São Paulo
16:00 UTC−03:00		Report (pt)		Stadium: Estádio Cícero Pompeu de Toledo (Morumbi); Attendance: 50,282; Referee: Wilson Luiz Seneme

16 October Round 29	São Paulo	3–0	Náutico	São Paulo
21:00 UTC−03:00	Ademilson 30'; Ganso 65'; Welliton 73'	Report (pt)		Stadium: Estádio Cícero Pompeu de Toledo (Morumbi); Attendance: 14,942; Referee: Elmo Alves Resende Cunha

20 October Round 30	Bahia	0–1	São Paulo	Salvador
16:00 UTC−02:00		Report (pt)	Aloísio 24'	Stadium: Arena Professor Octávio Mangabeira (Fonte Nova); Attendance: 24,765; Referee: Sandro Meira Ricci

27 October Round 31	Internacional	2–3	São Paulo	Caxias do Sul
16:00 UTC−02:00	Leandro Damião 33'; Jorge Henrique 48'	Report (pt)	Aloísio 10', 44' (pen.), 53' (pen.)	Stadium: Estádio Francisco Stédile (Centenário); Attendance: 5,603; Referee: Péricles Bassols

2 November Round 32	São Paulo	2–1	Portuguesa	São Paulo
19:30 UTC−02:00	Rodrigo Caio 8'; Aloísio 77'	Report (pt)	Luis Ricardo 41'	Stadium: Estádio Cícero Pompeu de Toledo (Morumbi); Attendance: 50,802; Referee: André Luiz de Freitas Castro

10 November Round 33	Atlético Paranaense	3–0	São Paulo	Curitiba
17:00 UTC−02:00	Marcelo 12'; Luiz Alberto 27'; Éderson 57'	Report (pt)		Stadium: Estádio Durival Britto e Silva (Vila Capanema); Attendance: 12,754; Referee: Paulo Henrique de Godoy Bezerra

13 November Round 34	São Paulo	2–0	Flamengo	Itu
21:50 UTC−02:00	Rogério Ceni 48' (pen.); Ademilson 62'	Report (pt)		Stadium: Estádio Novelli Júnior; Attendance: 15,636; Referee: Alicio Pena Júnior

17 November Round 35	Fluminense	2–1	São Paulo	Rio de Janeiro
17:00 UTC−02:00	Jean 24'; Gum 89'	Report (pt)	Welliton 17'	Stadium: Estádio Jornalista Mário Filho (Maracanã); Attendance: 32,459; Referee: Márcio Chagas da Silva

24 November Round 36	São Paulo	1–1	Botafogo	São Paulo
19:30 UTC−02:00	Aloísio 3'	Report (pt)	Elias 28'	Stadium: Estádio Cícero Pompeu de Toledo (Morumbi); Attendance: 12,692; Referee: Paulo Henrique de Godoy Bezerra

1 December Round 37	Criciúma	1–0	São Paulo	Criciúma
17:00 UTC−02:00	Wellington Paulista 1' (pen.)	Report (pt)		Stadium: Estádio Heriberto Hülse; Attendance: 18,081; Referee: Francisco Carlos do Nascimento

8 December Round 38	São Paulo	0–1	Coritiba	Itu
17:00 UTC−02:00		Report (pt)	Luccas Claro 29'	Stadium: Estádio Novelli Júnior; Attendance: 9,220; Referee: Pablo dos Santos Alves

=== Recopa Sudamericana ===
3 July First leg	São Paulo (Brazil)	1–2	(Brazil) Corinthians	São Paulo
21:50 UTC−03:00	Aloísio 46'	Report	Guerrero 28'; Renato Augusto 75'	Stadium: Estádio Cícero Pompeu de Toledo (Morumbi); Attendance: 31,691; Referee: Ricardo Marques Ribeiro (Brazil)

17 July Second leg	Corinthians (Brazil)	2–0 (4–1 agg.)	(Brazil) São Paulo	São Paulo
21:50 UTC−03:00	Romarinho 35'; Danilo 68'	Report		Stadium: Estádio Municipal Paulo Machado de Carvalho (Pacaembu); Attendance: 38,050; Referee: Paulo César de Oliveira (Brazil)

=== Suruga Bank Championship ===
7 August Final	Kashima Antlers (Japan)	3–2	(Brazil) São Paulo	Kashima
7:00 UTC−03:00	Osako 24', 38', 90+1'	Report	Ganso 58'; Aloísio 75'	Stadium: Kashima Soccer Stadium; Attendance: 26,202; Referee: Abdul Malik Abdul Bashir (Singapore)

=== Copa Sudamericana ===
==== Results summary ====
Overall								Home						Away					
Pld	W	D	L	GF	GA	GD	Pts	W	D	L	GF	GA	GD	W	D	L	GF	GA	GD
6	2	3	1	10	10	0	9	1	1	1	5	6	−1	1	2	0	5	4	+1

==== Round of 16 ====
26 September First leg	São Paulo (Brazil)	1–1	(Chile) Universidad Católica	São Paulo
21:50 UTC−03:00	Luís Fabiano 17'	Report	Castillo 40'	Stadium: Estádio Cícero Pompeu de Toledo (Morumbi); Attendance: 12,342; Referee: Darío Ubriaco (Uruguay)

23 October Second leg	Universidad Católica (Chile)	3–4 (4–5 agg.)	(Brazil) São Paulo	Santiago
21:50 UTC−02:00	Sosa 16'; Cordero 23'; Mirošević 71' (pen.)	Report	Aloísio 19', 24'; Ademilson 65'; Welliton 86'	Stadium: Estadio San Carlos de Apoquindo; Attendance: 11,155; Referee: Antonio Arias (Paraguay)

==== Quarter-finals ====
30 October First leg	São Paulo (Brazil)	3–2	(Colombia) Atlético Nacional	São Paulo
21:50 UTC−02:00	Jádson 14'; Antônio Carlos 72', 90+1'	Report	Uribe 40'; Duque 79'	Stadium: Estádio Cícero Pompeu de Toledo (Morumbi); Attendance: 22,441; Referee: Víctor Hugo Carrillo (Peru)

6 November Second leg	Atlético Nacional (Colombia)	0–0 (2–3 agg.)	(Brazil) São Paulo	Medellín
21:50 UTC−02:00		Report		Stadium: Estadio Atanasio Girardot; Attendance: 43,168; Referee: Enrique Osses (Chile)

==== Semi-finals ====
20 November First leg	São Paulo (Brazil)	1–3	(Brazil) Ponte Preta	São Paulo
21:50 UTC−02:00	Ganso 21'	Report	Antônio Carlos 44' (o.g.); Leonardo 53'; Uendel 71'	Stadium: Estádio Cícero Pompeu de Toledo (Morumbi); Attendance: 53,302; Referee: Diego Abal (Argentina)

27 November Second leg	Ponte Preta (Brazil)	1–1 (4–2 agg.)	(Brazil) São Paulo	Mogi Mirim
21:50 UTC−02:00	Leonardo 43'	Report	Luís Fabiano 84'	Stadium: Estádio Romildo Vitor Gomes Ferreira (Romildão); Referee: Carlos Vera (Ecuador)
