= 2013 Recopa Sudamericana =

Recopa Santander Sudamericana 2013 Recopa Santander Sul-Americana 2013
- Event: Recopa Sudamericana
São Paulo	Corinthians
(Brazil)	(Brazil)
1	4
- on aggregate

First leg
São Paulo	Corinthians
1	2
- Date: July 3, 2013
- Venue: Estádio do Morumbi, São Paulo
- Referee: Ricardo Marques (Brazil)
- Attendance: 31,691

Second leg
Corinthians	São Paulo
2	0
- Date: July 17, 2013
- Venue: Estádio do Pacaembu, São Paulo
- Referee: Paulo Oliveira (Brazil)
- Attendance: 38,050

The 2013 Recopa Sudamericana (officially the 2013 Recopa Santander Sudamericana for sponsorship reasons) was the 21st edition of the Recopa Sudamericana, the football competition organized by CONMEBOL between the winners of the previous season's two major South American club tournaments, the Copa Libertadores and the Copa Sudamericana.

The competition was contested in two-legged home-and-away format between two Brazilian teams, Corinthians, the 2012 Copa Libertadores champion, and São Paulo, the 2012 Copa Sudamericana champion. The first leg was hosted by São Paulo at Estádio do Morumbi in São Paulo on July 3, 2013, while the second leg was hosted by Corinthians at Estádio do Pacaembu in São Paulo on July 17, 2013.

Corinthians won both legs, the first leg by 2–1, and the second by 2–0, to win their first Recopa Sudamericana title. Corinthians captain Danilo was selected as the best player of the tournament.

As of 2025, this is the only Recopa Sudamericana decided in a Brazilian derby (Clássico Majestoso), as both teams represent the state and city of São Paulo.

== Format ==
The Recopa Sudamericana was played on a home-and-away two-legged basis, with the Copa Libertadores champion hosting the second leg. If tied on aggregate, the away goals rule was not used, and 30 minutes of extra time were played. If still tied after extra time, a penalty shoot-out was used to determine the winner.

== Qualified teams ==
Team	Qualification	Previous app.
(Brazil) Corinthians	2012 Copa Libertadores champion	None
(Brazil) São Paulo	2012 Copa Sudamericana champion	**1993**, **1994**, 2006

Bold indicates winning years

== Venues ==
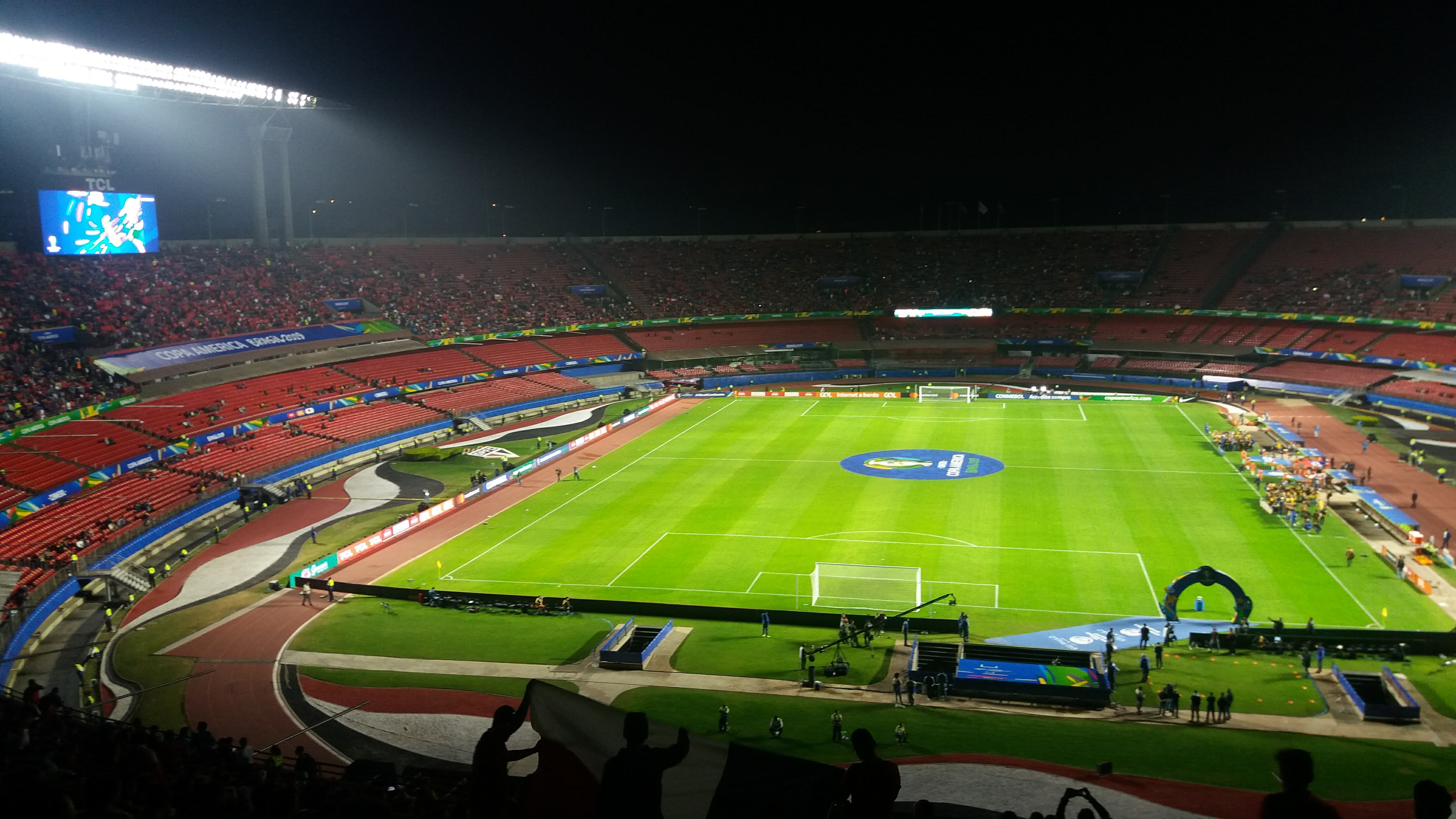
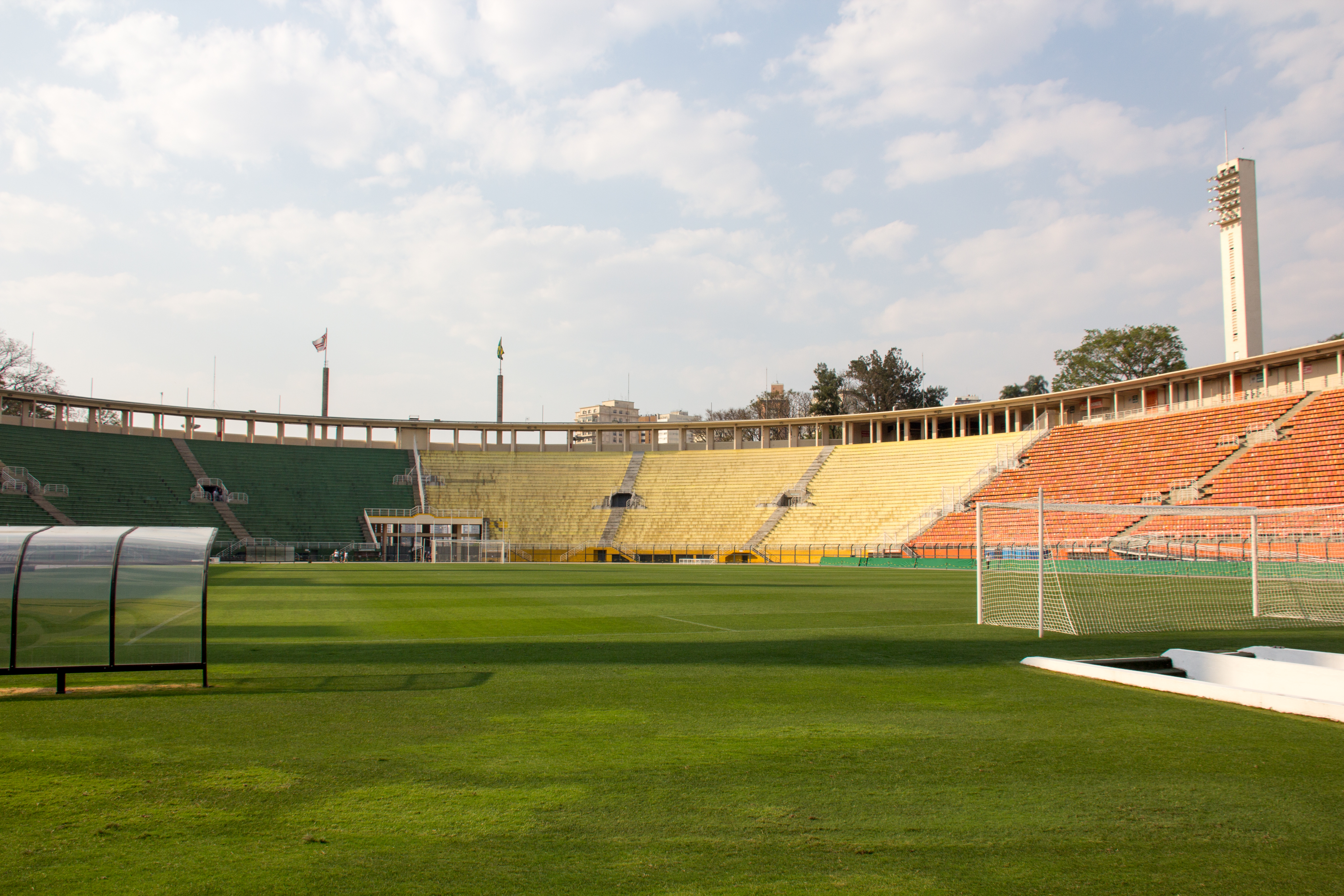
Estadio do Morumbi (left) and Estadio do Pacaembu, venues of the series

== Match details ==
=== First leg ===
July 3, 2013
21:50 UTC−3

São Paulo (Brazil)	1–2	(Brazil) Corinthians
Aloísio 46'	Report	Guerrero 29'; Renato Augusto 76'

Estádio do Morumbi, São Paulo
Attendance: 31,691
Referee: Ricardo Marques (Brazil)

**São Paulo**	**Corinthians**

GK	01	(Brazil) Rogério Ceni (c)
CB	7	(Brazil) Rodrigo Caio
CB	3	(Brazil) Lúcio
CB	2	(Brazil) Rafael Tolói
DM	15	(Brazil) Denílson		(substituted off) 79'
RM	23	(Brazil) Douglas		(substituted off) 46'
CM	8	(Brazil) Ganso	(yellow card) 21'	(substituted off) 46'
CM	10	(Brazil) Jádson	(yellow card) 75'
LM	16	(Brazil) Juan	(yellow card) 87'
SS	17	(Brazil) Osvaldo
CF	9	(Brazil) Luís Fabiano
Substitutes:
GK	12	(Brazil) Denis
DF	4	(Brazil) Rhodolfo
MF	5	(Brazil) Wellington	(yellow card) 90'	(substituted on) 46'
MF	18	(Brazil) Maicon
MF	20	(Brazil) Lucas Evangelista		(substituted on) 79'
FW	11	(Brazil) Ademilson
FW	19	(Brazil) Aloísio		(substituted on) 46'
Manager:
(Brazil) Ney Franco

GK	12	(Brazil) Cássio
RB	21	(Brazil) Edenilson
CB	4	(Brazil) Gil
CB	13	(Brazil) Paulo André
LB	6	(Brazil) Fábio Santos
CM	5	(Brazil) Ralf	(yellow card) 16'
CM	19	(Brazil) Guilherme
RW	17	(Brazil) Romarinho
AM	20	(Brazil) Danilo (c)		(substituted off) 28'
LW	11	(Qatar) Emerson	(yellow card) 41'	(substituted off) 82'
CF	9	(Peru) Paolo Guerrero	(yellow card) 90+3'
Substitutes:
GK	1	(Brazil) Júlio César
DF	3	(Brazil) Chicão
DF	23	(Brazil) Felipe
MF	8	(Brazil) Renato Augusto	(yellow card) 60'	(substituted on) 53'
MF	10	(Brazil) Douglas		(substituted on) 28'	(substituted off) 53'
MF	18	(Brazil) Ibson		(substituted on) 82'
FW	7	(Brazil) Alexandre Pato
Manager:
(Brazil) Tite

Assistant referees:
Marcelo Van Gasse (Brazil)
Kléber Lucio Gil (Brazil)
Fourth official:
Pericles Cortez (Brazil)

=== Second leg ===
July 17, 2013
21:50 UTC−3

Corinthians (Brazil)	2–0	(Brazil) São Paulo
Romarinho 36'; Danilo 69'	Report

Estádio do Pacaembu, São Paulo
Attendance: 38,050
Referee: Paulo Oliveira (Brazil)

**Corinthians**	**São Paulo**

GK	12	(Brazil) Cássio
RB	21	(Brazil) Edenilson
CB	4	(Brazil) Gil
CB	13	(Brazil) Paulo André
LB	6	(Brazil) Fábio Santos
CM	5	(Brazil) Ralf
CM	19	(Brazil) Guilherme
RW	17	(Brazil) Romarinho		(substituted off) 81'
AM	20	(Brazil) Danilo (c)	(yellow card) 33'
LW	11	(Qatar) Emerson		(substituted off) 89'
CF	9	(Peru) Paolo Guerrero		(substituted off) 86'
Substitutes:
GK	22	(Brazil) Danilo Fernandes
DF	2	(Brazil) Alessandro
DF	3	(Brazil) Chicão
MF	8	(Brazil) Renato Augusto		(substituted on) 81'
MF	10	(Brazil) Douglas
MF	18	(Brazil) Ibson		(substituted on) 89'
FW	7	(Brazil) Alexandre Pato		(substituted on) 86'
Manager:
(Brazil) Tite

GK	01	(Brazil) Rogério Ceni (c)
CB	7	(Brazil) Rodrigo Caio
CB	3	(Brazil) Lúcio
CB	2	(Brazil) Rafael Tolói
RM	23	(Brazil) Douglas	(yellow card) 22'
CM	5	(Brazil) Wellington		(substituted off) 46'
CM	15	(Brazil) Denílson
LM	16	(Brazil) Juan		(substituted off) 68'
RF	17	(Brazil) Osvaldo
CF	9	(Brazil) Luís Fabiano
LF	8	(Brazil) Ganso
Substitutes:
GK	12	(Brazil) Denis
DF	13	(Brazil) Reinaldo
MF	14	(Brazil) Edson Silva
MF	18	(Brazil) Maicon		(substituted on) 68'
MF	20	(Brazil) Lucas Evangelista
FW	11	(Brazil) Ademilson
FW	19	(Brazil) Aloísio		(substituted on) 46'
Manager:
(Brazil) Paulo Autuori

Assistant referees:
Márcio Santiago (Brazil)
Fabricio Vilarinho (Brazil)
Fourth official:
Wilton Sampaio (Brazil)
