= Mateus Caramelo =

Brazilian footballer (1994–2016)

- Mateus Caramelo in 2016

Personal information
- Full name: Mateus Lucena dos Santos
- Date of birth: 30 August 1994
- Place of birth: Araçatuba, Brazil
- Date of death: 28 November 2016 (aged 22)
- Place of death: La Unión, Colombia
- Height: 1.84 m (6 ft 0 in)
- Position: Right back

Youth career
- 2009–2013: Mogi Mirim

Senior career*
Years	Team	Apps	(Gls)
2013	Mogi Mirim	3	(0)
2013–2016	São Paulo	15	(0)
2014	→ Atlético Goianiense (loan)	23	(1)
2015	→ Chapecoense (loan)	5	(0)
2016	→ Chapecoense (loan)	3	(0)
Total		49	(1)
- * Club domestic league appearances and goals

Mateus Lucena dos Santos (30 August 1994 – 28 November 2016), commonly known as Caramelo, was a Brazilian professional footballer who played for Chapecoense on loan from São Paulo FC as a right back.

Caramelo was one of the victims when LaMia Airlines Flight 2933 crashed on 28 November 2016.

== Club career ==
=== Mogi Mirim ===
Born in Clementina, São Paulo, Caramelo joined Mogi Mirim's youth setup in 2009, aged 14. On 21 April 2013 he made his senior debut, starting in a 1–0 Campeonato Paulista home win against São Paulo.

Caramelo remained as a starter in the following two matches, a 6–0 routing of Botafogo-SP and a 1–1 draw against Santos, with his side being knocked out in the semifinals after a penalty shootout.

=== São Paulo ===
On 17 May 2013, Caramelo and Mogi teammate Roni signed with São Paulo. He made his Série A debut on 6 June, coming on as a second half substitute for Maicon in a 0–1 home loss against Goiás.

After returning from loan in January 2016, Caramelo was included in the main squad. Mainly used as a backup to Bruno, he was sent out on loan for the third time after the arrival of Julio Buffarini.

==== Atlético Goianiense (loan) ====
Rarely used by Tricolor in the previous campaign, Caramelo signed a one-year loan deal with Atlético Goianiense. A starter during the club's Campeonato Goiano winning campaign, he was demoted to second-choice during the year's Série B.

Caramelo's first professional goal came on 3 October 2014, in a 1–1 away draw against América Mineiro.

==== Chapecoense (loans) ====
In January 2015, Caramelo joined Chapecoense on loan until December. He was rarely used during his first spell at the club, being an immediate backup to starter Apodi.

On 5 August 2016, Caramelo returned to Chape also on loan, until the end of the year. Initially a second-choice to Gimenez, he overtook the latter in the final stages of the season.

== Death ==
On 28 November 2016, whilst at the service of Chapecoense, Caramelo was among the fatalities of the LaMia Airlines Flight 2933 accident in the Colombian village of Cerro Gordo, La Unión, Antioquia.

== Career statistics ==
As of 27 November 2016

Club	Season	League			State League		Cup		Continental		Other		Total	
Club	Season	Division	Apps	Goals	Apps	Goals	Apps	Goals	Apps	Goals	Apps	Goals	Apps	Goals
Mogi Mirim	2013	Série C	0	0	3	0	—		—		—		3	0
São Paulo	2013	Série A	3	0	—		—		0	0	0	0	3	0
São Paulo	2016	Série A	4	0	8	0	0	0	4 (Note: Appearance(s) in Copa Libertadores)	0	—		16	0
São Paulo	Subtotal		7	0	8	0	0	0	4	0	0	0	19	0
Atlético Goianiense	2014	Série B	13	1	10	0	1	0	—		—		24	1
Chapecoense	2015	Série A	4	0	1	0	0	0	4 (Note: Appearance(s) in Copa Sudamericana)	0	—		9	0
Chapecoense	2016	Série A	3	0	—		—		3	0	—		6	0
Chapecoense	Subtotal		7	0	1	0	0	0	7	0	—		15	0
Career total			27	1	22	0	1	0	11	0	0	0	61	1

== Honours ==
Chapecoense

- Copa Sudamericana: 2016 (posthumously)
