= Denílson (footballer, born 1988) =

Brazilian footballer

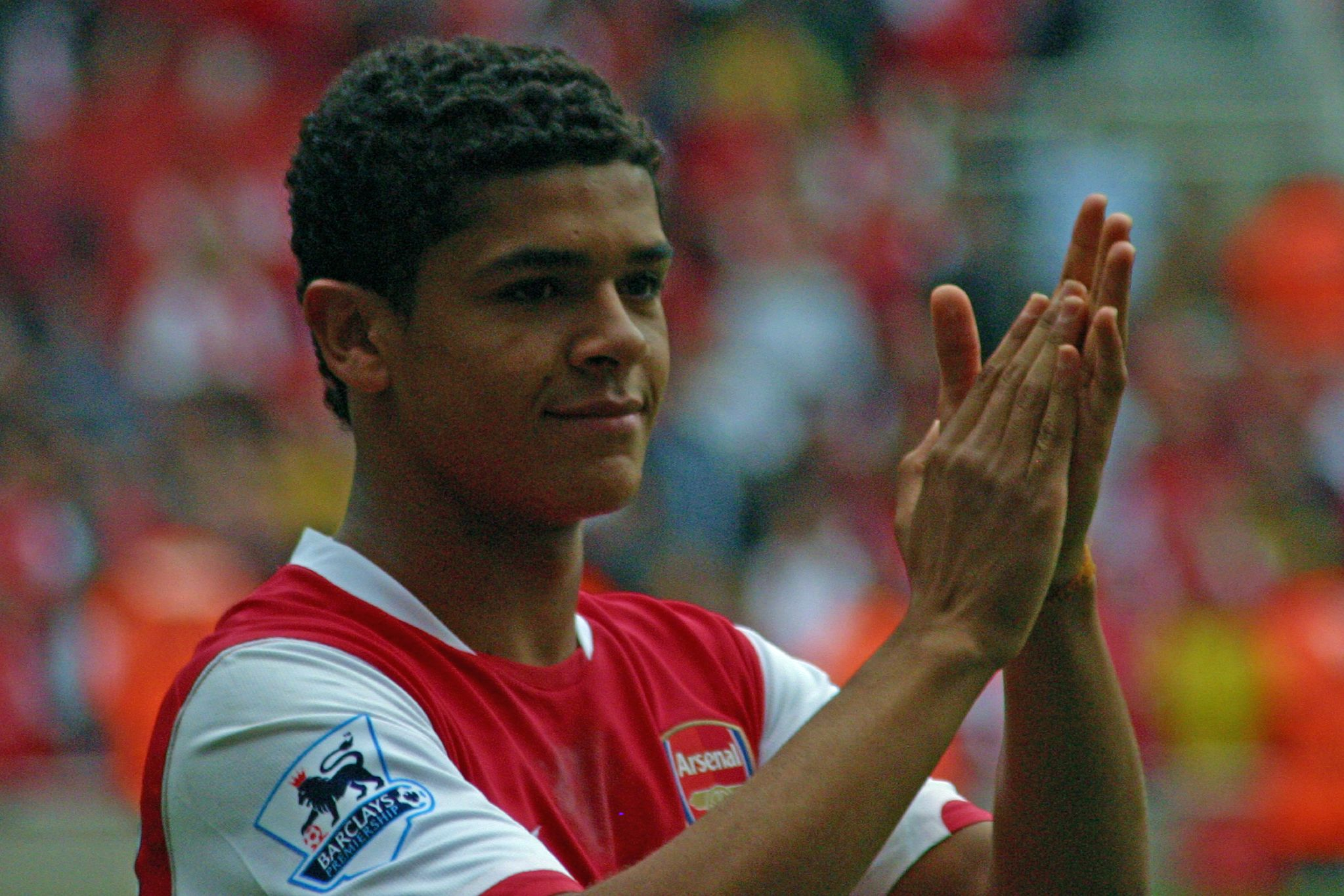
- Denilson playing for Arsenal in 2007

Personal information
- Full name: Denílson Pereira Neves
- Date of birth: 16 February 1988 (age 38)
- Place of birth: São Paulo, Brazil
- Height: 1.82 m (6 ft 0 in)
- Position: Midfielder

Youth career
- 1998–2005: São Paulo

Senior career*
Years	Team	Apps	(Gls)
2005–2006	São Paulo	12	(0)
2006–2013	Arsenal	96	(7)
2011–2013	→ São Paulo (loan)	48	(1)
2013–2015	São Paulo	59	(0)
2015–2017	Al-Wahda	29	(2)
2016	→ Cruzeiro (loan)	5	(0)
2019	Botafogo-SP	1	(0)
2020–2021	Sliema Wanderers	14	(0)
2021	Brasil de Pelotas	8	(0)
Total		272	(10)

International career
2005	Brazil U17	6	(1)
- * Club domestic league appearances and goals

Denílson Pereira Neves (born 16 February 1988), known as Denílson, is a Brazilian former professional footballer. He mainly featured as a central midfielder who at times also played in the role of defensive midfielder. He is also a former youth captain of Brazil.

== Early life ==
Born in São Paulo, Brazil, Denílson is the second of four sons born to José Neves and Luciene Pereira. His father José is a former midfielder at Botafogo-PB in Northeast Brazil. However, he was forced to quit football in order to support his family. Denílson and his family survived extreme poverty as his parents struggled to raise him and his brothers in the dangerous favelas of São Paulo. Many of Denílson's childhood friends have since died due to their involvement in the drug trade.

== Club career ==
=== São Paulo ===
He started his career at São Paulo, where he was part of the side that won the 2005 Copa Libertadores and the 2005 FIFA Club World Cup. However, he was underutilized for São Paulo FC, having only made twelve appearances for the club, eight of those coming off the substitutes' bench.

=== Arsenal ===
==== 2006–07 season ====
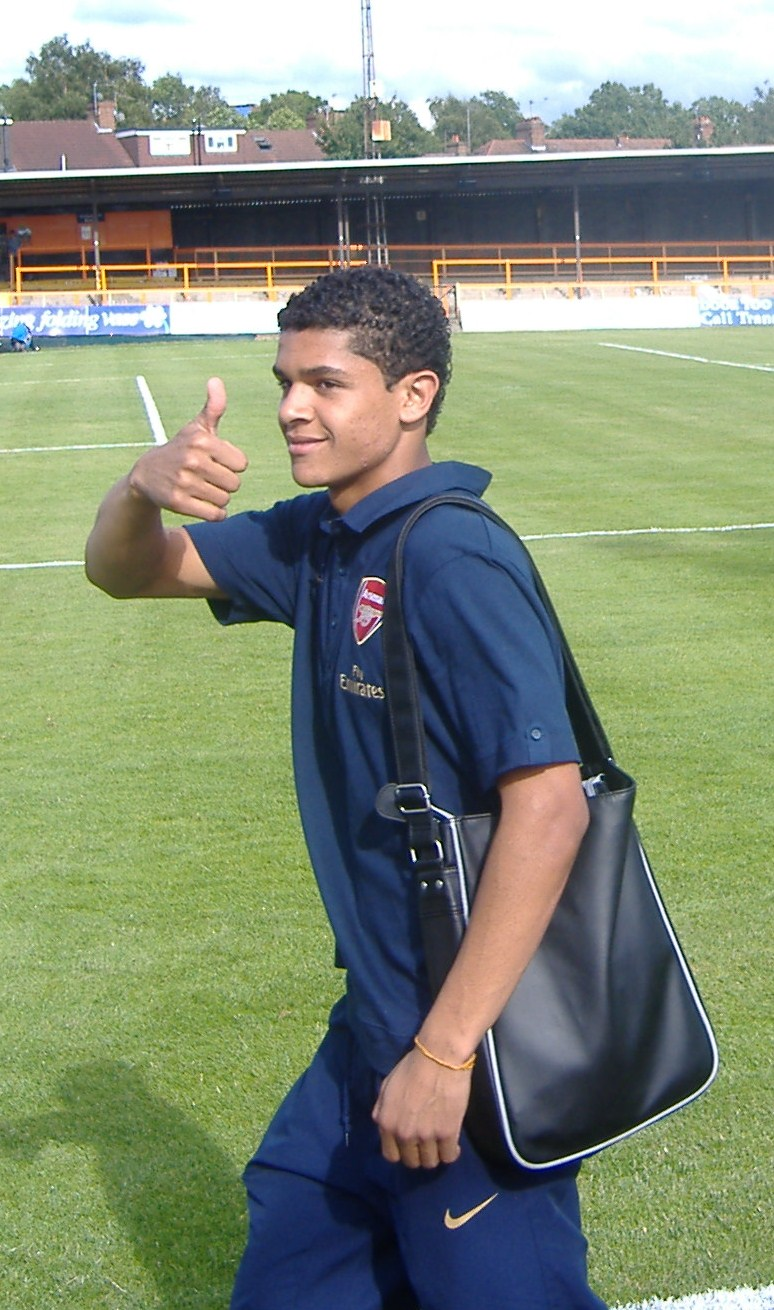
Denílson Pereira Neves training for Arsenal in 2007

On 31 August 2006, Denílson joined English club Arsenal for a fee of £3.4 million, choosing 15 as his shirt number. Many were surprised by his transfer to Arsenal because of his lack of experience in club football. He was described as "a little bit in between Tomáš Rosický and Gilberto" by Arsenal manager Arsène Wenger. Denílson was included in Arsenal's 19-man squad that travelled to face CSKA Moscow in the UEFA Champions League on 17 October 2006; he was named on the substitutes bench for the match, but did not play. He had to wait until 24 October 2006 for his first-team debut, when he started a League Cup third round match against West Bromwich Albion. He was ever-present in Arsenal's 2006–07 League Cup campaign.

He made his Premier League debut for Arsenal on 30 December 2006, coming on as a substitute in a 1–0 defeat against Sheffield United at Bramall Lane.

==== 2007–08 season ====
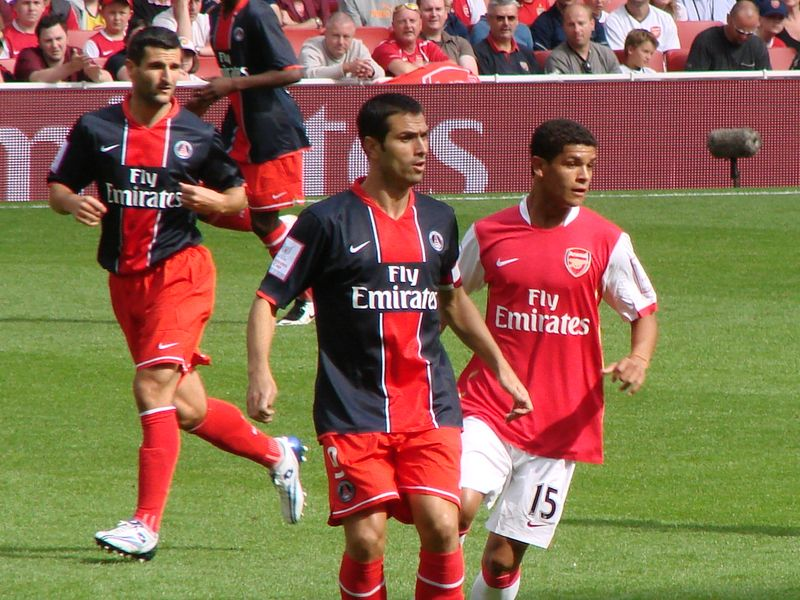
Denílson marking Pauleta of Paris Saint-Germain at the Emirates Cup in July 2007

His first goal for Arsenal came in the League Cup Third Round fixture against Newcastle United on 25 September 2007, sealing a 2–0 win. The good performance and goal seemed to have secured him a long-term place at Arsenal after it was announced that he had awarded a new contract with the club on 18 October 2007. Denílson scored another long-range shot in a League Cup match against Sheffield United on 31 October 2007, netting the final goal in Arsenal's 3–0 win. Denílson's first league start came on 24 November 2007 in a match against Wigan Athletic and the young Brazilian once again impressed, with Arsenal eventually winning the match 2–0 thanks to late goals from William Gallas and Tomáš Rosický. He received his first red card at Ewood Park against Blackburn Rovers in the League Cup quarter-finals, where he was sent off moments before extra time.

==== 2008–09 season ====
Due to the departure of many experienced players such as Mathieu Flamini, Gilberto Silva and Aliaksandr Hleb, Denílson received more playing time and partnered Cesc Fàbregas in central midfield on many occasions. He was named in the starting line-up for all of Arsenal's five competitive matches in August 2008, scoring his first Premier League goal on 30 August 2008 in their 3–0 win at home to Newcastle United at the Emirates Stadium. On 13 September 2008, he started and played the full 90 minutes against Blackburn Rovers at Ewood Park in a 4–0 victory for the Gunners and also got booked. He continued to play as a regular for Arsenal through December and scored his second Premier League goal in their 3–1 away win at Bolton Wanderers on 20 September 2008. With Fàbregas out for the last remaining months of 2008, he did well to fill in for the captain and was rewarded with more playing time. Denílson added a third Premier League goal of the campaign vs. Aston Villa at Villa Park in a 2–2 draw on 26 December 2008. On 11 March 2009, he converted his penalty to seal a 7–6 shoot-out victory over Roma in the Champions League Round of 16 second-leg match.

==== 2009–10 season ====
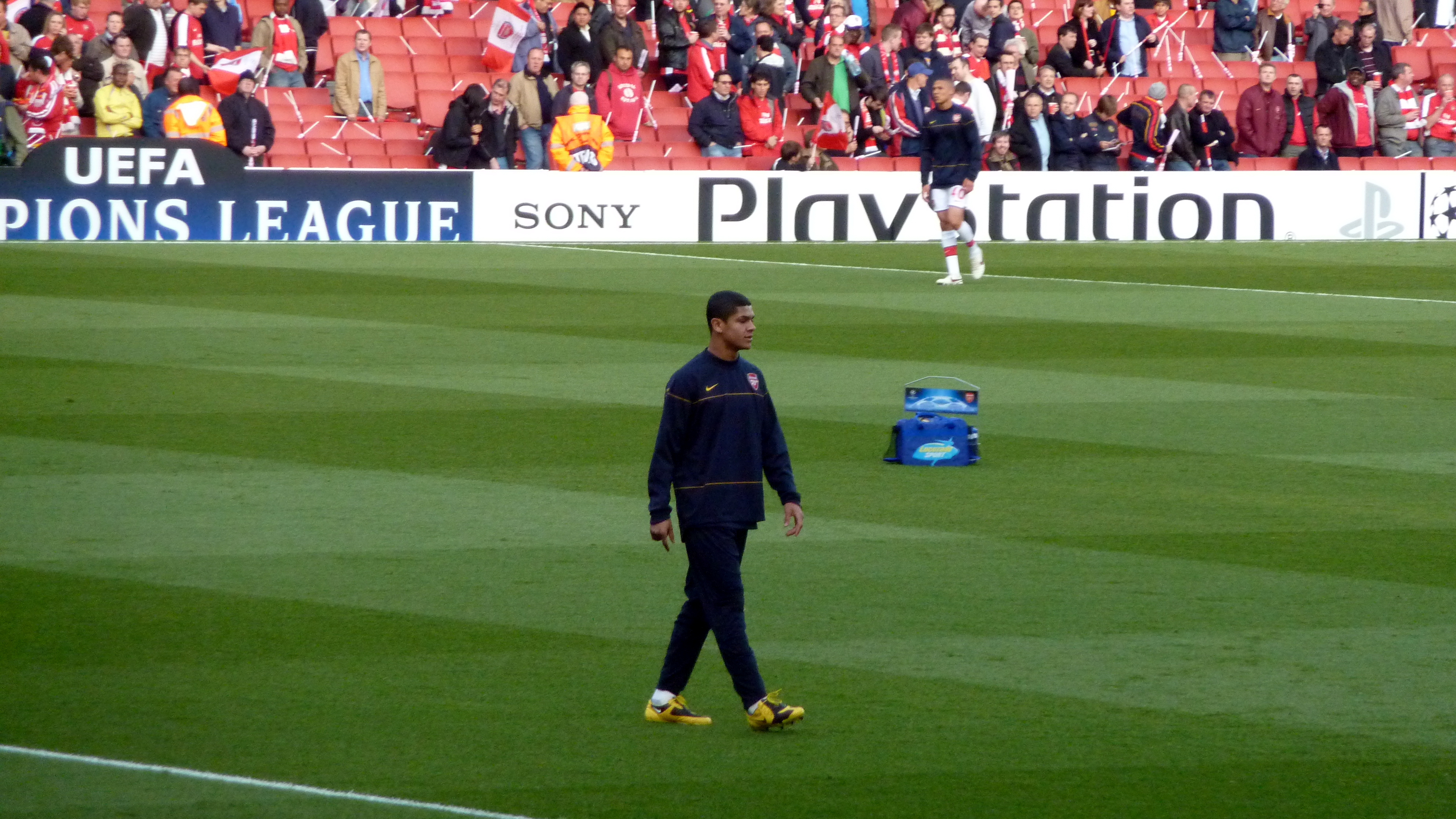
Denílson in 2009

Denílson started the first match of the 2009–10 season with a powerful strike from 25 yards out to beat Everton goalkeeper Tim Howard, leading to Arsenal winning the match 6–1 at Goodison Park. A month later, he signed a new five-year deal at the Emirates Stadium. However, he was then diagnosed with a seemingly innocuous back injury. This, though, was not the case and he was sidelined for two months at a crucial stage of the season. Denílson came back to action against Standard Liège on 23 November where he scored Arsenal's second goal with a long-range effort in their 2–0 home win. This was Denílson's 100th appearance for the club. He afterward went on to score again for Arsenal against Hull City, Everton, Stoke City and West Ham United. Denílson altogether netted a sum of six times during that season, with all these goals being long range strikes, as in the instance of a free kick upon Hull City. In the club's league campaign, Denílson was capped 28 times, with him making starts in 25 of those games. In all, he scored five league goals for the Gunners, in an eventful season where they finished third in the Premier League.

==== 2010–11 season ====
Due to the emergence of teenage sensation Jack Wilshere and his own injury concerns, Denílson appeared less often in the 2010–11 season, being used mostly as a substitute starting only six Barclays Premier League matches and featuring in just 16 in total. Overall, he made 32 appearances in all competitions, 20 starts and 12 from the bench. On 19 May 2011, Denílson announced that he was set to leave Arsenal in the summer and it was reported that he wanted to return to Brazil. Arsenal finished in fourth place that season leaving them behind Manchester City in the places for automatic Champions League Qualifying.

=== São Paulo loan ===
Denílson returned to former club São Paulo on loan for the 2011–12 season after confirming he was to leave Arsenal earlier in the summer. His number 15 squad number at Arsenal was given to new signing Alex Oxlade-Chamberlain for the 2011–12 season.

Denílson was sent off twice in his first three matches, with the latter of the red cards coming after he swore at a referee. Denílson thereafter received a number of angry messages in response to his playing upon Twitter. He then in response described the fans of whom spoke adversely about then São Paulo head coach Adílson Batista as being 'very, very annoying'. Denílson also claimed that he did not mean for his comments to be taken in a negative way towards all of the fans of the club. This was followed by a row of which ensued to such a level that several supporters demanded that Denílson was never to play for São Paulo again.

On 6 October, he scored his first goal whilst upon loan, a long range strike for São Paulo against Palmeiras in a Brazilian Serie A game. Denilson was instrumental in São Paulo getting to the final of 2012's Copa Sudamericana where in the second leg of such Tigre refused to play the match in its entirety. As so São Paulo went on to victoriously lift the trophy with Denilson copping a winners medal altogether.

On 3 June 2013, Denílson's agent confirmed that both Arsenal and Denílson had agreed to terminate his contract by mutual consent.

=== São Paulo ===
On 14 June 2013, Denílson signed a four-year contract with São Paulo. His transfer was praised by Ney Franco.

=== Al Wahda ===
He moved to Al Wahda during the summer of 2015. Whilst at Al Wahda, Denilson won the UAE League Cup of 2016.

=== Cruzeiro ===
On 19 July 2016, Cruzeiro announced that they signed Denílson on loan until the end of the year. After only five league matches in his spell, the club stated that they would not exercise their option of buying the player.

=== Return to Al Wahda and release ===
After surgery in his right knee in 2017, Denílson agreed his contract termination with Al Wahda on July of the same year.

=== Botafogo-SP ===
After more than two years from his last professional match and a total of three knee surgeries, Denílson was signed by Brazilian Série B club Botafogo-SP for the 2019 season. He made his debut for the club as a substitute in the 2019 Campeonato Paulista loss against Red Bull Brasil. He was released in April having made no further appearances, due to fitness issues.

=== Sliema Wanderers ===
In August 2020 Denílson decided to come back to Europe, signing a one-year contract with the Maltese Premier League side Sliema Wanderers.

== International career ==
Denílson has played for and captained Brazil at every junior level since he was a member of the under-15 squad. He captained the U17s to a runners-up spot at the 2005 FIFA U-17 World Championship. In November 2006, Denílson was called up to the Brazilian national side for a friendly match against Switzerland to replace his Arsenal teammate Gilberto Silva who pulled out for personal reasons. However, he did not make his debut, as he was an unused substitute in the match.

== Personal life ==
Denílson is described as "very quiet and polite" and is often compared to Gilberto Silva, his former teammate at Arsenal. Denílson often credits Gilberto Silva with his current success as he acted as a "father" to him when he first moved from Brazil to London.

Denílson is fond of Brazilian music and the samba—he can even be found on YouTube singing and dancing with his former Brazilian Arsenal teammates Gilberto Silva and Júlio Baptista. He typically celebrates his goals by going to the corner flag and dancing a samba in front of fans, which he did when he scored his first Premier League goal for Arsenal.

He is married, and has a son from his marriage.

Denílson is a fan of Arsenal.

== Career statistics ==
Appearances and goals by club, season and competition
Club	Season	League			State League		Cup		Continental (Note: Includes appearances and goals from Copa Libertadores da América, Copa Sul-Americana and UEFA Champions League.)		Other (Note: Includes appearances and goals from EFL Cup and UAE League Cup.)		Total	
Club	Season	Division	Apps	Goals	Apps	Goals	Apps	Goals	Apps	Goals	Apps	Goals	Apps	Goals
São Paulo	2005	Série A	11	0	—		—		—		—		11	0
São Paulo	2006	Série A	1	0	9	0	—		—		—		10	0
São Paulo	Total		12	0	9	0	0	0	0	0	0	0	21	0
Arsenal	2006–07	Premier League	10	0	—		2	0	1	0	6	0	19	0
Arsenal	2007–08	Premier League	13	0	—		1	0	4	0	5	2	23	2
Arsenal	2008–09	Premier League	37	3	—		2	0	12	0	0	0	51	3
Arsenal	2009–10	Premier League	20	3	—		1	1	7	1	0	0	28	5
Arsenal	2010–11	Premier League	16	0	—		6	0	5	0	5	0	32	0
Arsenal	Total		96	6	0	0	12	1	29	1	16	2	153	10
São Paulo (loan)	2011	Série A	14	0	—		0	0	2	0	—		16	0
São Paulo (loan)	2012	Série A	31	1	17	0	8	0	9	0	—		65	1
São Paulo (loan)	2013	Série A	3	0	12	0	—		9	0	—		24	0
São Paulo	2013	Série A	14	0	—		—		5	0	—		19	0
São Paulo	2014	Série A	28	0	2	0	1	0	6	0	—		37	0
São Paulo	2015	Série A	4	0	11	0	—		7	0	—		22	0
São Paulo	Total		94	0	42	0	9	0	38	0	0	0	183	1
Al-Wahda	2015–16	Arabian Gulf League	23	1	—		—		—		6	1	29	2
Cruzeiro (loan)	2016	Série A	3	0	—		2	0	—		—		5	0
Botafogo-SP	2019	Série B	0	0	1	0	—		—		—		1	0
Sliema Wanderers	2020–21	Maltese Premier League	9	0	0	0	—		—		—		9	0
Career total			237	9	52	0	23	1	67	1	22	3	401	14

== Honours ==
São Paulo

- Copa Libertadores: 2005
- FIFA Club World Cup: 2005
- Copa Sudamericana: 2012

Arsenal

- Football League Cup runner-up: 2006–07, 2010–11

Al Wadha

- UAE League Cup: 2015–16

Brazil U17

- South American U-17 Championship: 2005
- FIFA U-17 World Championship: runner-up 2005
