= Douglas (footballer, born August 1990) =

Brazilian footballer

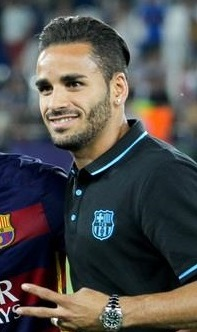
- Douglas with Barcelona in 2015

Personal information
- Full name: Douglas Pereira dos Santos
- Date of birth: 6 August 1990 (age 36)
- Place of birth: Monte Alegre, Brazil
- Height: 1.71 m (5 ft 7 in)
- Position: Right-back

Youth career
- 2002–2009: Goiás

Senior career*
Years	Team	Apps	(Gls)
2009–2011	Goiás	64	(5)
2012–2014	São Paulo	69	(4)
2014–2019	Barcelona	3	(0)
2016–2017	→ Sporting Gijón (loan)	21	(3)
2017–2018	→ Benfica (loan)	5	(0)
2018–2019	→ Sivasspor (loan)	29	(3)
2019–2022	Beşiktaş	5	(0)

International career^{‡}
2009–2010	Brazil U20	13	(2)
- * Club domestic league appearances and goals as of 18:24, 1 February 2020 (UTC) ‡ National team caps and goals as of 2 September 2018

Douglas Pereira dos Santos (born 6 August 1990), simply known as Douglas (Brazilian Portuguese: [ˈdowɡlɐs]), is a Brazilian former professional footballer who played as a right-back.

== Club career ==
=== Goiás ===
Born in Monte Alegre de Goiás, Douglas joined Goiás' youth setup in 2002, aged 12, and was promoted to the first-team in 2009, mainly as a backup to Vítor. He made his professional – and Série A – debut on 20 June 2009, coming on as a late substitute in a 2–2 away draw against Grêmio.

Douglas was handed his first start on 15 July, in a 0–2 home loss against Avaí. He finished the campaign with 14 appearances (seven starts, 741 minutes of action), as his side finished ninth.

In 2010, after Victor's departure to Palmeiras, Douglas became the club's first-choice, appearing in 24 matches but being relegated. He scored his first professional goal on 15 July 2011, netting the last of a 4–1 home routing over Vitória for the Série B championship.

Douglas finished the season with 26 appearances, scoring five goals as the Esmeraldino finished in the 11th place.

=== São Paulo ===
On 11 February 2012, Douglas signed a three-year deal with São Paulo. However, he missed the whole Campeonato Paulista due to a pubalgia.

Douglas made his debut for Tricolor on 6 June 2012, starting in a 0–1 away loss against Internacional. He scored his first goal for the club on 14 October, netting the last of a 2–0 home success against Figueirense. He was also a regular in the club's Copa Sudamericana winning campaign.

Douglas featured regularly for the club in 2013, but faced fierce competition with new signing Paulo Miranda. The latter was later more used as a central defender, while the former also appeared as a central midfielder in some occasions.

In 2014 Douglas was again challenged by another new face, Luis Ricardo. He was mainly a backup to the latter during the year's Campeonato Paulista, but later retained his place in the starting XI.

=== Barcelona ===
On 26 August 2014, Douglas agreed a five-year deal with La Liga club Barcelona for amount of €4 million fee plus €1.5 million in add-ons. He signed his contract with the Catalans three days later, being presented hours later.

After being an unused substitute in Barça's 1–0 home win against APOEL for the season's UEFA Champions League, Douglas made his debut on 24 September, starting and being booked in a 0–0 draw at Málaga. He was later criticized for his performance, and was demoted to third-choice right back behind Dani Alves and Martín Montoya, only being limited to appear in Copa del Rey.

==== Loan deals ====
On 26 August 2016, Barcelona and Sporting de Gijón reached an agreement for the season-long loan of Douglas. He made his debut for the Asturians on 17 September in a 5–0 loss at Atlético Madrid, and scored his first goal in Spanish football on 4 December in a 3–1 win against Osasuna at El Molinón. He totalled 23 appearances and three goals over the season, but Sporting were relegated.

On 30 August 2017, Douglas joined Portuguese champions Benfica on a season-long loan deal.

On 24 July 2018, Douglas was loaned once again, this time to Turkish side Sivasspor. His first goal for Sivasspor was in a Süper Lig match with Trabzonspor.

=== Beşiktaş ===
On 27 July 2019, Douglas left Barcelona, joining Turkish club Beşiktaş. In February 2020, he suffered a femur injury and never played for Beşiktaş again. Douglas is currently a free agent after being released from Beşiktaş in 2022.

== International career ==
Douglas was a member of the Brazil national under-20 team, appearing in the 2009 South American U-20 Championship and 2009 FIFA U-20 World Cup, reaching the final game against Ghana.

== Career statistics ==
As of 1 February 2020

Club	Season	League		Cup		Continental		Other		Total	
Club	Season	Apps	Goals	Apps	Goals	Apps	Goals	Apps	Goals	Apps	Goals
Brazil		League (Note: Includes Brasileirão and Campeonato Brasileiro Série B)		Copa do Brasil		Continental (Note: Includes cup competitions such as Copa Libertadores, Copa Sudamericana, and Recopa Sudamericana)		State League (Note: Includes Campeonato Goiano and Paulista)		Total	
Goiás	2009	14	0	—		1 (Note: All appearances in Copa Sudamericana)	0	—		15	0
Goiás	2010	24	0	5	0	0	0	8	0	37	0
Goiás	2011	26	5	0	0	0	0	0	0	26	5
Goiás	Total	64	5	5	0	9	0	0	0	78	5
São Paulo	2012	33	2	5	1	6	0	0	0	44	3
São Paulo	2013	26	1	0	0	16 (Note: Two appearances in Recopa Sudamericana, nine appearances in Copa Libertadores, five appearances in Copa Sudamericana)	0	15	0	57	1
São Paulo	2014	10	1	4	0	0	0	9	1	23	2
São Paulo	Total	69	4	9	1	22	0	24	1	124	6
Spain		La Liga		Copa del Rey		Europe		Other (Note: Includes Supercopa de España, Club World Cup)		Total	
Barcelona	2014–15	2	0	3	0	0	0	—		5	0
Barcelona	2015–16	1	0	2	0	0	0	0	0	3	0
Barcelona	Total	3	0	5	0	0	0	0	0	8	0
Sporting Gijón	2016–17	21	3	2	0	—		—		23	3
Portugal		Primeira Liga		Taça de Portugal		Europe		Other (Note: Includes Taça da Liga)		Total	
Benfica	2017–18	5	0	1	0	3 (Note: Includes UEFA Champions League)	0	1	0	10	0
Turkey		Süper Lig		Turkish Cup		Europe		Other		Total	
Sivasspor	2018–19	32	3	0	0	—		—		32	3
Beşiktaş	2019–20	5	0	0	0	2 (Note: Includes UEFA Europa League)	0	—		7	0
Career total		206	15	24	1	25	0	24	1	289	17

== Honours ==
São Paulo

- Copa Sudamericana: 2012

Barcelona

- La Liga: 2014–15, 2015–16
- Copa del Rey: 2014–15, 2015–16
- Supercopa de España: 2016
- UEFA Super Cup: 2015
- FIFA Club World Cup: 2015
