= Silvinho (footballer, born 1990) =

Brazilian footballer

Personal information
- Full name: Silvio José Cardoso Reis Junior
- Date of birth: 1 July 1990 (age 36)
- Place of birth: Guajará-Mirim, Brazil
- Height: 1.75 m (5 ft 9 in)
- Position: Left winger

Team information
- Current team: Figueirense
- Number: 88

Youth career
- Nacional-PR
- 2005–2009: Corinthians

Senior career*
Years	Team	Apps	(Gls)
2009–2010	Monte Azul	8	(1)
2010	Bragantino	13	(1)
2011	Marília	0	(0)
2011–2012	Comercial	16	(3)
2012–2013	LASK Linz	28	(6)
2013	→ Penapolense (loan)	17	(6)
2013	São Paulo	8	(0)
2014	Ponte Preta	14	(2)
2014–2015	Criciúma	30	(4)
2015	Joinville	9	(1)
2016	Chapecoense	27	(3)
2016	Seongnam FC	13	(2)
2017	Criciúma	29	(9)
2018	Ponte Preta	0	(0)
2018	Paraná	30	(3)
2019	Penapolense	0	(0)
2019–2020	Albirex Niigata	51	(7)
2021	CSA	22	(1)
2021	Criciúma	17	(4)
2022	São Bernardo	13	(3)
2022	Operário Ferroviário	15	(2)
2022–2023	Mirassol	17	(0)
2023	→ São Bernardo (loan)	8	(1)
2024	São Bernardo	30	(5)
2025	Botafogo-SP	9	(0)
2025	Botafogo-PB	15	(3)
2026–	Figueirense	12	(1)
- * Club domestic league appearances and goals as of 10 November 2026

Sílvio José Cardoso Reis Júnior (born 1 July 1990, in Guajará-Mirim), commonly known as Silvinho, is a Brazilian left winger who plays for Figueirense.

== Honours ==
Monte Azul

- Campeonato Paulista Série A2: 2009

CSA

- Campeonato Alagoano: 2021
