= Wellington (footballer, born January 1991) =

Brazilian footballer

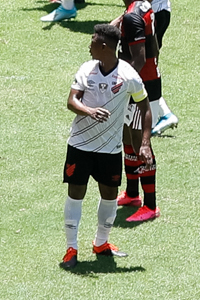

Personal information
- Full name: Wellington Aparecido Martins
- Date of birth: 28 January 1991 (age 35)
- Place of birth: São Paulo, Brazil
- Height: 1.73 m (5 ft 8 in)
- Position: Defensive midfielder

Team information
- Current team: Noroeste

Youth career
- 2005–2009: São Paulo

Senior career*
Years	Team	Apps	(Gls)
2008–2018	São Paulo	165	(2)
2014–2016	→ Internacional (loan)	38	(1)
2017–2018	→ Vasco da Gama (loan)	40	(0)
2018–2020	Athletico Paranaense	109	(1)
2021–2022	Fluminense	54	(0)
2023	Avaí	30	(0)
2024	Goiás	10	(0)
2025–	Noroeste	0	(0)
- * Club domestic league appearances and goals as of 14:13, 5 November 2021 (UTC)

Wellington Aparecido Martins (born 28 January 1991), simply known as Wellington, is a Brazilian professional footballer who plays as a defensive midfielder for Noroeste.

== Club career ==
As of 5 November 2021

Club	Season	League			State League		Cup		Continental		Other		Total	
Club	Season	Division	Apps	Goals	Apps	Goals	Apps	Goals	Apps	Goals	Apps	Goals	Apps	Goals
São Paulo	2008	Série A	1	0	0	0	0	0	2 (Note: Appearance(s) in Copa Sudamericana)	0	—		3	0
São Paulo	2009	Série A	6	0	2	0	0	0	1	0	—		9	0
São Paulo	2010	Série A	4	0	3	0	—		0	0	—		7	0
São Paulo	2011	Série A	34	1	3	0	0	0	4	0	—		41	1
São Paulo	2012	Série A	14	0	6	1	0	0	8	0	—		28	1
São Paulo	2013	Série A	29	0	15	0	0	0	14 (Note: Nine appearances in Copa Libertadores, five appearances in Copa Sudamericana)	0	2 (Note: Appearance(s) in Recopa Sudamericana)	0	60	0
São Paulo	2014	Série A	0	0	14	0	2	0	0	0	—		16	0
São Paulo	2016	Série A	3	0	0	0	0	0	0	0	—		3	0
São Paulo	2017	Série A	0	0	2	0	1	0	1	0	—		4	0
São Paulo	Total		91	1	45	1	3	0	30	0	2	0	171	2
Internacional (loan)	2014	Série A	19	1	—		—		2	0	—		21	1
Internacional (loan)	2015	Série A	15	0	0	0	2	0	0	0	—		17	0
Internacional (loan)	Total		34	1	0	0	2	0	2	0	—		38	1
Vasco da Gama	2017	Série A	26	0	—		—		—		—		26	0
Vasco da Gama	2018	Série A	4	0	10	0	1	0	9 (Note: Appearance(s) in Copa Libertadores)	0	—		24	0
Vasco da Gama	Total		30	0	10	0	1	0	9	0	—		50	0
Athletico Paranaense	2018	Série A	19	1	—		—		8	0	—		27	1
Athletico Paranaense	2019	Série A	29	0	0	0	8	0	4	0	3 (Note: Two appearances in Recopa Sudamericana, one appearance in J.League Cup / Copa Sudamericana Championship)	0	44	0
Athletico Paranaense	2020	Série A	20	0	8	0	2	0	7	0	1 (Note: Appearance(s) in Supercopa do Brasil)	0	38	0
Athletico Paranaense	Total		68	1	8	0	10	0	19	0	4	0	109	1
Fluminense	2021	Série A	11	0	10	0	2	0	5	0	—		28	0
Career total			234	3	73	1	18	0	65	0	6	0	396	4

== Honours ==
São Paulo

- Campeonato Brasileiro Série A: 2008
- Copa Sudamericana: 2012

Athletico Paranaense

- Copa Sudamericana: 2018
- J.League Cup / Copa Sudamericana Championship: 2019
- Copa do Brasil: 2019
