= Lucas Farias =

Brazilian footballer

Personal information
- Full name: Lucas Farias Gomes
- Date of birth: 18 August 1994 (age 32)
- Place of birth: São Paulo, Brazil
- Height: 1.74 m (5 ft 9 in)
- Position: Right back

Youth career
- 2006–2014: São Paulo

Senior career*
| Years | Team | Apps | (Gls) |
| 2012–2017 | São Paulo | 4 | (0) |
| 2014 | → Boa Esporte (loan) | 1 | (0) |
| 2015 | → Náutico (loan) | 12 | (0) |
| 2016–2017 | → Estoril Praia (loan) | 9 | (0) |
| 2018 | São Bento | 7 | (0) |
| 2019 | Indy Eleven | 13 | (0) |

International career^{‡}
| 2013 | Brazil U20 | 4 | (0) |
- * Club domestic league appearances and goals as of 23 October 2019 ‡ National team caps and goals as of 4 June 2013

Lucas Farias Gomes (born 18 August 1994) is a Brazilian professional footballer who plays as a right back, most recently for USL Championship club Indy Eleven.

== Honours ==
Brazil U-20

- Toulon Tournament: 2013
