= Aloísio (footballer, born 1988) =

Chinese footballer (born 1988)

Luo Guofu
Personal information
- Full name: Luo Guofu
- Birth name: Aloísio dos Santos Gonçalves
- Date of birth: 19 June 1988 (age 38)
- Place of birth: Araranguá, Santa Catarina, Brazil
- Height: 1.76 m (5 ft 9 in)
- Position: Striker

Youth career
- 2001–2006: Grêmio

Senior career*
Years	Team	Apps	(Gls)
2006–2009	Grêmio	12	(1)
2007–2008	→ Chiasso (loan)	14	(7)
2010	Caxias	15	(1)
2011	Chapecoense	20	(14)
2011–2013	Tombense	0	(0)
2011–2012	→ Figueirense (loan)	68	(32)
2013	→ São Paulo (loan)	48	(15)
2014–2016	Shandong Luneng	66	(33)
2016–2017	Hebei China Fortune	37	(20)
2018–2019	Guangdong South China Tiger	51	(23)
2020–2021	Guangzhou FC	14	(3)
2022–2023	América Mineiro	36	(11)
Total		305	(123)

International career^{‡}
2021–2022	China	5	(1)
- * Club domestic league appearances and goals as of 15:25, 20 May 2023 (UTC) ‡ National team caps and goals as of 1 February 2022

Aloísio
- Chinese: 洛国富
Transcriptions
Standard Mandarin
- Hanyu Pinyin: Luò Guófù

Luo Guofu (Chinese: 洛国富; pinyin: Luò Guófù, born 19 June 1988), born Aloísio dos Santos Gonçalves and known as Aloísio, is a former professional footballer who played as a striker. Born in Brazil, he has represented the China national team.

== Club career ==
Aloísio signed his first professional contract with Grêmio in June 2006 for five years. The club attached a £7.25 million buy-out clause. Aloísio made his full debut in a 2–0 win for Grêmio against São Caetano on October 14, 2006.

In August 2007, he moved to Swiss second division side FC Chiasso on loan for two seasons.

On May 18, 2011, he joined Brazilian Série A club Figueirense on the back of excellent performances at his former team Chapecoense in the Campeonato Catarinense. He scored 14 goals in 19 matches to lead Chapecoense to the Champions Trophy.

On December 1, 2012 Aloisio confirmed that he had signed a pre-contract with São Paulo which came with a release clause in case a big European side came in for him. On December 7 the president of São Paulo FC, Juvenal Juvêncio, confirmed Aloísio would be playing for the team in the 2013 season.

On 10 July 2013, Aloísio scored the 1,000th goal in São Paulo's history in the Brazilian League, playing at home in the 1-2 loss against Bahia. In the next game, Aloisio scored a goal with his left hand against Portuguesa de Desportos in a 2-1 loss. A week later, against CR Flamengo, Aloísio repeated the move. On October 27, 2013 Aloísio scored his first hat-trick playing for São Paulo FC in a 3-2 league victory against SC Internacional.

Aloísio joined Chinese Super League side Shandong Luneng in January 2014 for a fee of €5 million. He was the top scorer for the 2015 Chinese Super League season with 22 goals in 28 games. Aloísio transferred to fellow Super League side Hebei China Fortune in July 2016.

On 16 January 2018, Aloísio joined China League One newcomer Meizhou Meixian Techand, signing a two-year contract.

On 8 April 2022, Aloísio signed with Brazilian club América Mineiro, wearing the pinyin transcription of his Chinese name (Luo GF) on the back of his shirt. He suffered with injuries, and eventually announced his retirement from professional football on 24 June 2024, six months after leaving América Mineiro.

== International career ==
On 7 September 2021, Aloísio made his international debut in a 0–1 defeat to Japan in the 2022 FIFA World Cup qualification. In his second international match against Saudi Arabia, Aloísio scored a goal and had the opportunity to level the score with 9 minutes before the end of the game, but lost it.

== Career statistics ==
=== Club ===
As of 20 May 2023

Club	Season	League			State league		National cup (Note: Includes Swiss Cup, Copa do Brasil, Chinese FA Cup)		Continental		Other		Total	
Club	Season	Division	Apps	Goals	Apps	Goals	Apps	Goals	Apps	Goals	Apps	Goals	Apps	Goals
Grêmio	2006	Série A	5	0	0	0	0	0	—		—		5	0
Grêmio	2007	Série A	0	0	7	1	0	0	2 (Note: Appearances in Copa Libertadores)	0	—		9	1
Grêmio	Total		5	0	7	1	0	0	2	0	—		14	1
Chiasso	2007–08	Swiss Challenge League	14	7	—		1	2	—		—		15	9
Caxias	2010	Série C	7	1	8	0	—		—		—		15	1
Chapecoense	2011	Série B	0	0	20	14	—		—		—		20	14
Figueirense	2011	Série A	21	4	—		—		—		—		21	4
Figueirense	2012	Série A	30	14	17	14	0	0	2 (Note: Appearances in Copa Sudamericana)	0	—		49	28
Figueirense	Total		51	18	17	14	0	0	2	0	—		70	32
São Paulo	2013	Série A	33	11	15	4	0	0	15 (Note: Nine appearances and two goals in Copa Libertadores, six appearances and two goals in Copa Sudamericana)	4	2 (Note: Appearances in Recopa Sudamericana)	1	65	20
Shandong Luneng	2014	Chinese Super League	27	10	—		7	4	6 (Note: Appearances in AFC Champions League)	1	—		40	15
Shandong Luneng	2015	Chinese Super League	28	22	—		3	2	0	0	1 (Note: Appearance in Chinese Super Cup)	0	32	24
Shandong Luneng	2016	Chinese Super League	11	1	—		2	1	0	0	—		13	2
Shandong Luneng	Total		66	33	—		12	7	6	1	1	0	85	41
Hebei China Fortune	2016	Chinese Super League	11	6	—		0	0	—		—		11	6
Hebei China Fortune	2017	Chinese Super League	26	14	—		0	0	—		—		26	14
Hebei China Fortune	Total		37	20	—		0	0	—		—		37	20
Guangdong South China Tiger	2018	China League One	26	12	—		0	0	—		—		26	12
Guangdong South China Tiger	2019	China League One	25	11	—		1	0	—		—		26	11
Guangdong South China Tiger	Total		51	23	—		1	0	—		—		52	23
Guangzhou Evergrande	2020	Chinese Super League	5	0	—		1	1	3	0	—		9	1
Guangzhou Evergrande	2021	Chinese Super League	9	3	—		0	0	0	0	—		9	3
Guangzhou Evergrande	Total		14	3	—		1	1	3	0	—		18	4
América Mineiro	2022	Série A	22	4	—		4	0	2	0	—		28	4
América Mineiro	2023	Série A	5	3	9	4	4	4	2	0	—		20	11
América Mineiro	Total		27	7	9	4	9	4	4	0	—		48	15
Career total			305	123	76	37	24	14	32	5	3	1	439	180

=== International ===
China
Year	Apps	Goals
2021	4	1
2022	1	0
Total	5	1

Scores and results list China's goal tally first.

No.	Date	Venue	Opponent	Score	Result	Competition
1.	12 October 2021	King Abdullah Sports City Stadium, Jeddah, Saudi Arabia	Saudi Arabia	1–2	2–3	2022 FIFA World Cup qualification

== Honours ==
=== Club ===
Grêmio

- Campeonato Gaúcho: 2007

Chapecoense

- Campeonato Catarinense: 2011

São Paulo

- Eusébio Cup: 2013

Shandong Luneng

- Chinese FA Cup: 2014
- Chinese FA Super Cup: 2015

Individual

- Chinese Super League Golden Boot award: 2015

== See also ==
- List of Chinese naturalized footballers
