= Lucas Evangelista =

Brazilian footballer (born 1995)

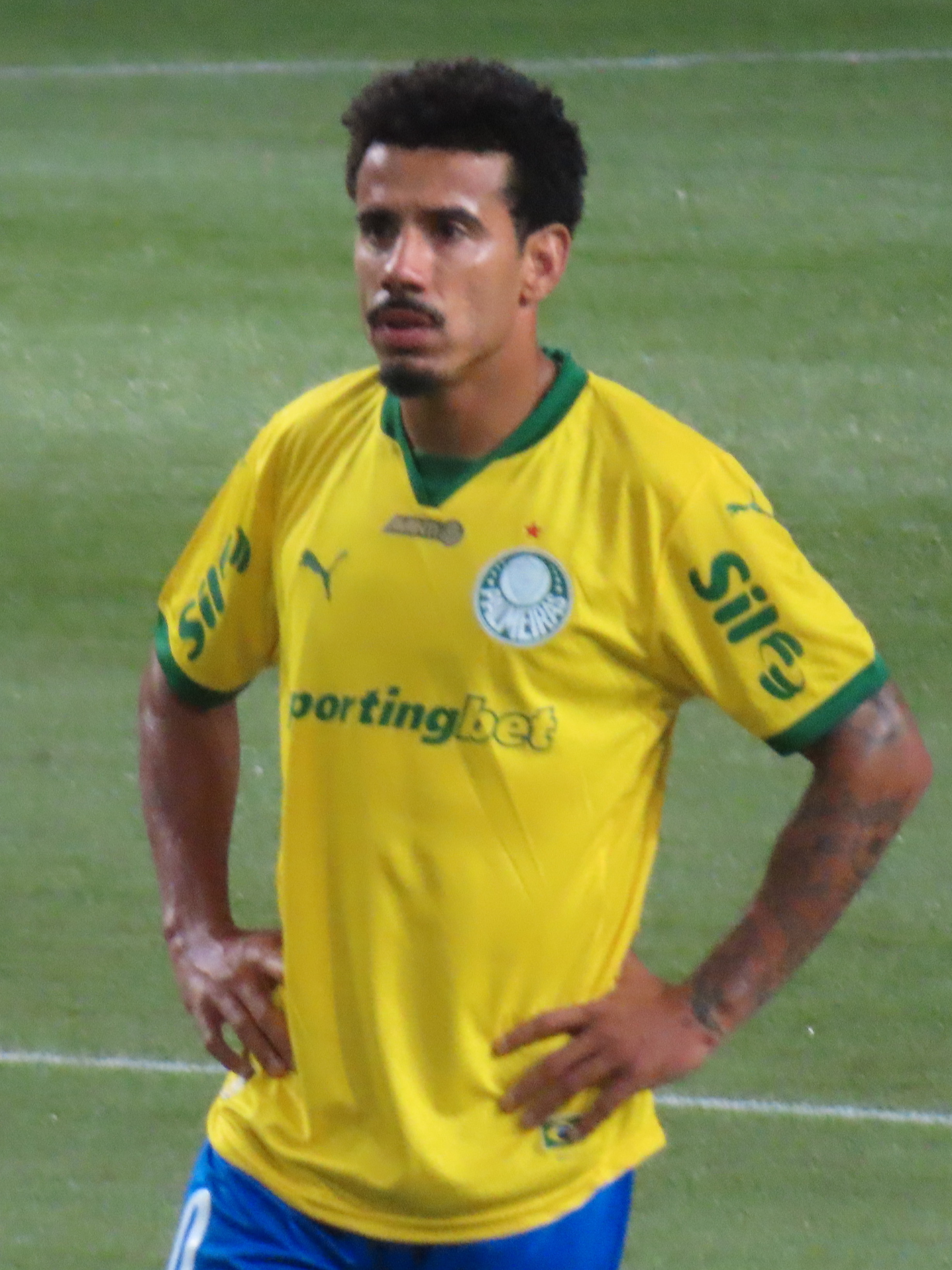
- Evangelista playing for Palmeiras in 2025

Personal information
- Full name: Lucas Evangelista Santana de Oliveira
- Date of birth: 6 February 1995 (age 31)
- Place of birth: Limeira, Brazil
- Height: 1.83 m (6 ft 0 in)
- Position: Central midfielder

Team information
- Current team: Palmeiras
- Number: 30

Youth career
- 2006–2009: São Paulo
- 2009–2013: Desportivo Brasil
- 2012–2013: → São Paulo (loan)

Senior career*
Years	Team	Apps	(Gls)
2012–2014	Desportivo Brasil	1	(0)
2013–2014	→ São Paulo (loan)	23	(2)
2014–2018	Udinese	10	(0)
2016	→ Panathinaikos (loan)	11	(1)
2017–2018	→ Estoril (loan)	34	(4)
2018–2021	Nantes	14	(1)
2019–2020	→ Vitória Guimarães (loan)	19	(1)
2020–2021	→ Red Bull Bragantino (loan)	38	(4)
2021–2025	Red Bull Bragantino	132	(8)
2025–	Palmeiras	33	(2)

International career
2015	Brazil U20	11	(0)
- * Club domestic league appearances and goals as of 7 April 2026

Lucas Evangelista Santana de Oliveira (born 6 February 1995) is a Brazilian professional footballer who plays as a central midfielder for Sociedade Esportiva Palmeiras.

== Club career ==
=== Desportivo Brasil ===
Born in Limeira, São Paulo, Evangelista began his career with the youth sides of São Paulo FC at the age of 11, as a centre-back. In 2009, aged 14, he was released after failing to receive a place in the club's youth accommodations, and moved to Desportivo Brasil's youth sides.

In March 2012, Evangelista joined Manchester United on a trial basis, as both clubs had a partnership agreement, but the deal later fell through. He made his first team debut on 19 May of that year, starting in a 1–0 Campeonato Paulista Segunda Divisão away win over Primavera.

=== São Paulo ===
On 20 September 2012, Desportivo Brasil announced Evangelista's return to São Paulo on a loan deal; the club also bought 30% of his economic rights for a fee of R$ 1 million. In May 2013, the club's president Juvenal Juvêncio and head coach Ney Franco, promoted him and a further three players from the under-20s to the senior squad to replace seven players separated from the squad.

Evangelista made his first team – and Série A – debut on 2 June 2013, starting in a 0–0 away draw against Atlético Mineiro. He scored his first professional goal on 11 August, netting the equalizer in a 2–1 loss at Portuguesa. Evangelista lobbed the player marking him and shot to beat Portuguesa's goalkeeper Lauro, and dedicated the goal to his father (it was Father's Day in Brazil that day), Jesus.

Evangelista ended his first senior year at the club with 23 appearances, being utilized in the left-back or as a forward aside from his natural position. However, he started the 2014 season featuring rarely, and left the club in July after his loan expired.

In August 2014, São Paulo bought another 30% of Evangelista's economic rights, and subsequently sold him to Udinese for € 4 million, retaining € 2.4 million.

=== Udinese Calcio ===
Evangelista made his debut abroad on 19 October 2014, starting in a 1–0 away loss to Torino. He scored his first goal for the club on 3 December, netting Udinese's third in a 4–2 home win over Cesena for the season's Coppa Italia.

==== Loans to Panathinaikos and Estoril ====
On 20 January 2016, after being rarely used, Evangelista moved to Panathinaikos for the rest of the season. He played 11 matches for the side, scoring once.

On 28 June 2017, after one season again as a backup at Udinese, Evangelista was loaned to Primeira Liga side Estoril, for one year. He became an undisputed starter for the side, being also included in the 33-man list for the best players of the season.

=== Nantes ===
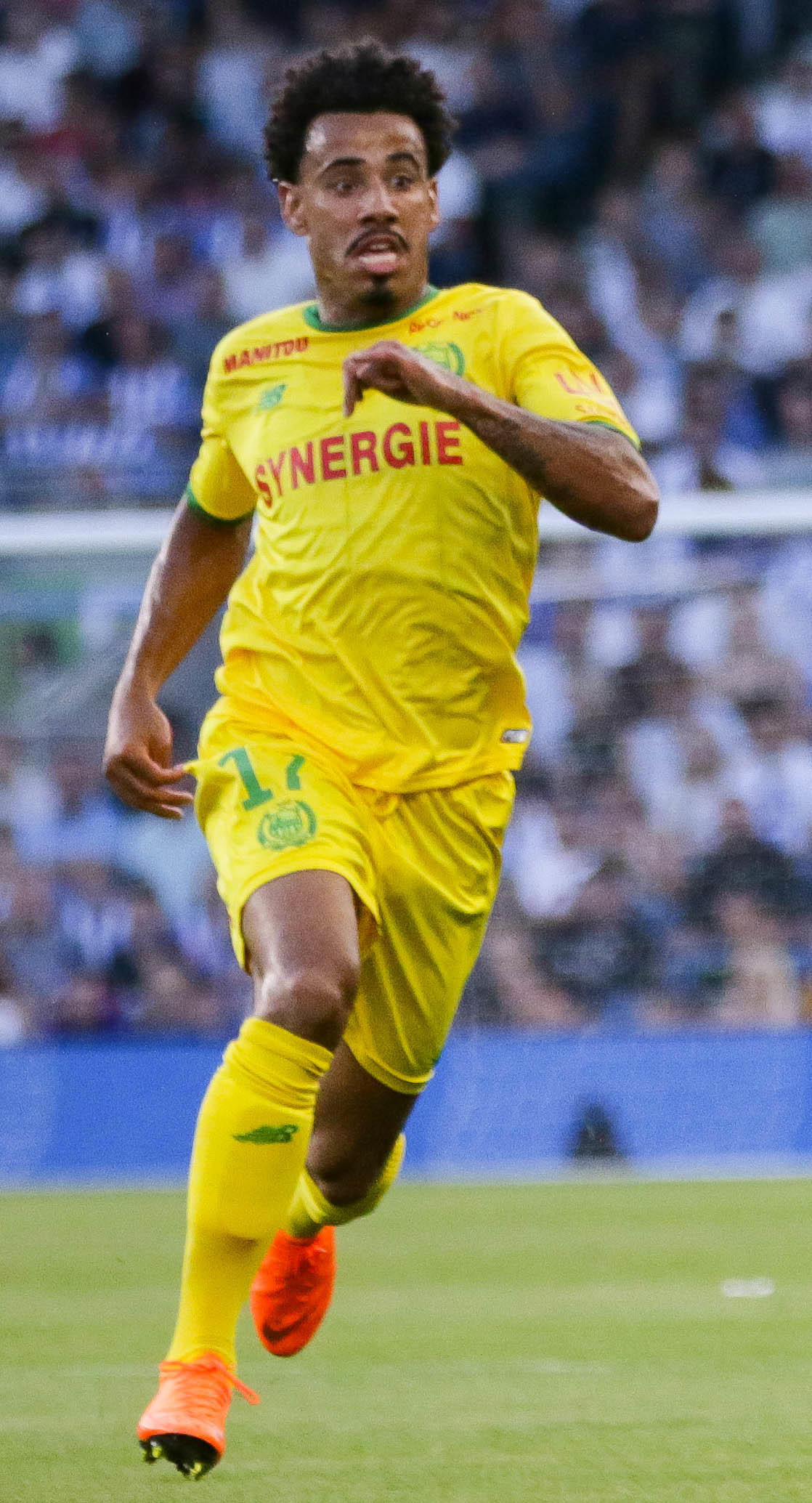
Evangelista playing for Nantes in 2018

On 27 July 2018, Evangelista joined Ligue 1 side Nantes on a five-year deal. He started the season as a first-choice, but eventually lost his space.

==== Loan to Vitória de Guimarães ====
On 23 August 2019, Evangelista returned to Portugal after agreeing to a one-year loan deal with Vitória de Guimarães, with a buyout clause. On 2 July 2020, despite the league's date extension, his loan was cut short.

=== Red Bull Bragantino ===
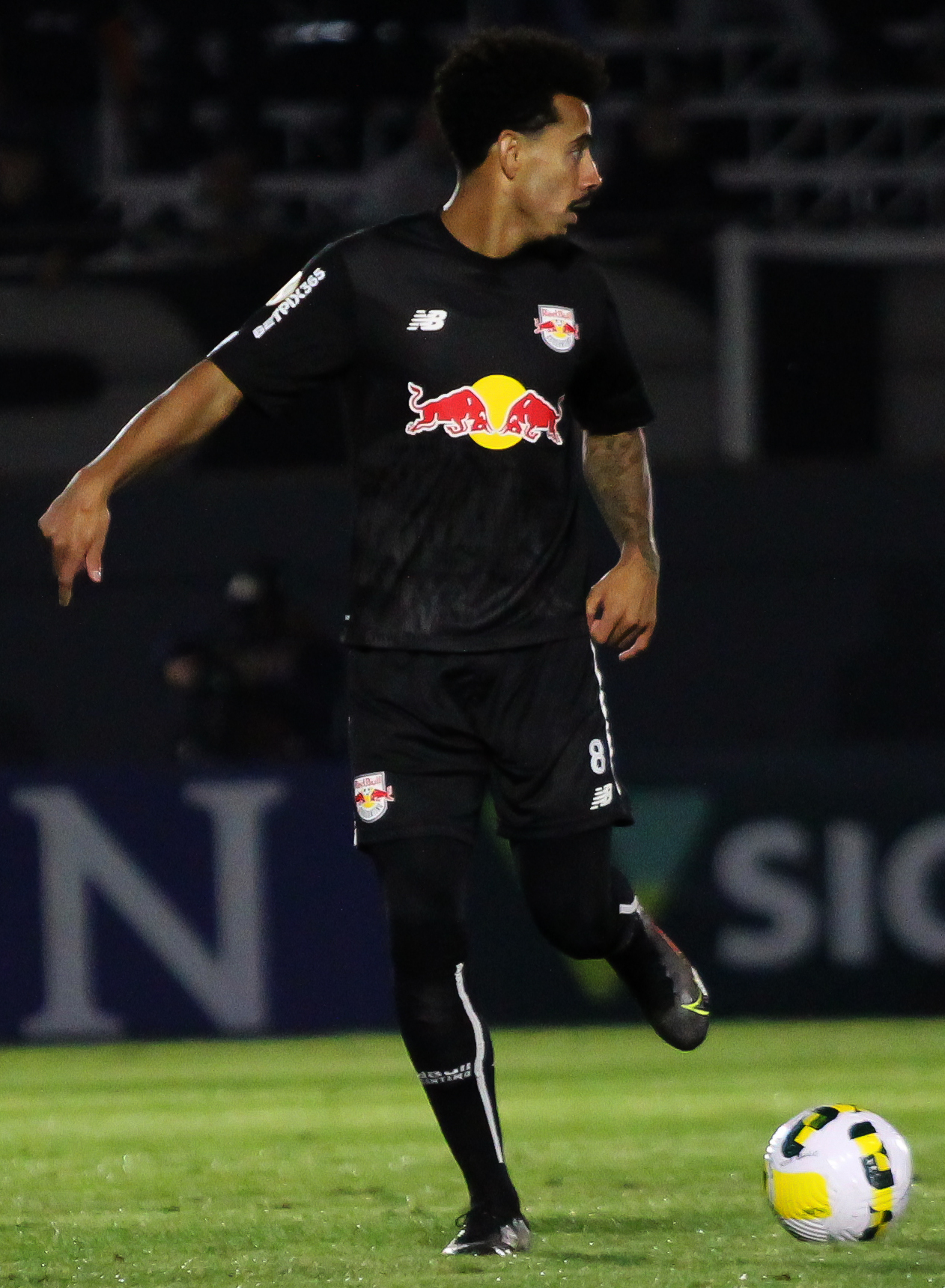
Evangelista in action for Red Bull Bragantino in 2022

On 10 August 2020, Evangelista returned to Brazil after signing a one-year loan deal with Red Bull Bragantino. On 28 June 2021, the club announced that they exercised his buyout clause, with the player signing a contract until 2026.

Evangelista suffered a thigh injury in August 2021, being sidelined for seven months. He reached 200 matches for the club on 6 December, in a 2–1 away win over Athletico Paranaense.

== Career statistics ==
=== Club ===
As of 26 December 2024

Appearances and goals by club, season and competition
Club	Season	League			State League (Note: Includes Campeonato Paulista Segunda Divisão, Campeonato Paulista)		National cup (Note: Includes Copa do Brasil, Coppa Italia, Taça de Portugal, Coupe de France)		Continental		Other		Total	
Club	Season	Division	Apps	Goals	Apps	Goals	Apps	Goals	Apps	Goals	Apps	Goals	Apps	Goals
Desportivo Brasil	2012	Paulista 2ª Divisão	—		1	0	—		—		—		1	0
São Paulo (loan)	2013	Série A	19	1	—		—		3 (Note: One appearance in Recopa Sudamericana, Two appearances in Copa Sudamericana)	0	1 (Note: Appearance(s) in J.League Cup / Copa Sudamericana Championship)	0	23	1
São Paulo (loan)	2014	Série A	—		4	1	0	0	—		—		4	1
São Paulo (loan)	Total		19	1	4	1	0	0	3	0	1	0	27	2
Udinese	2014-15	Serie A	4	0	—		1	1	—		—		5	1
Udinese	2015-16	Serie A	0	0	—		2	0	—		—		2	0
Udinese	2016-17	Serie A	6	0	—		0	0	—		—		6	0
Udinese	Total		10	0	—		3	1	—		—		13	1
Panathinaikos (loan)	2015-16	Super League Greece	11	1	—		1	0	0	0	—		12	1
Estoril (loan)	2017-18	Primeira Liga	34	4	—		—		—		1 (Note: Appearance(s) in Taça da Liga)	0	35	4
Nantes	2018-19	Ligue 1	14	1	—		4	0	—		1 (Note: Appearance(s) in Coupe de la Ligue)	0	19	1
Vitória Guimarães (loan)	2019-20	Primeira Liga	19	1	—		—		4 (Note: Appearance(s) in UEFA Europa League)	0	3	0	26	1
Red Bull Bragantino	2020	Série A	20	2	—		2	0	—		—		22	2
Red Bull Bragantino	2021	Série A	14	2	12	0	4	0	10 (Note: Appearance(s) in Copa Sudamericana)	1	—		40	3
Red Bull Bragantino	2022	Série A	34	2	4	0	2	0	5 (Note: Appearance(s) in Copa Libertadores)	0	—		45	2
Red Bull Bragantino	2023	Série A	33	1	—		0	0	8	2	—		41	3
Red Bull Bragantino	2024	Série A	32	2	9	0	4	0	8 (Note: One appearance in Copa Libertadores, Seven appearances in Copa Sudamericana)	0	—		53	2
Red Bull Bragantino	Total		133	9	25	0	12	0	33	3	—		201	12
Career Total			240	17	30	1	20	1	40	3	6	0	336	22

== Honours ==
Palmeiras

- Campeonato Paulista: 2026

Brazil U20

- Toulon Tournament: 2014
