= Roni (footballer, born January 1991) =

Brazilian footballer

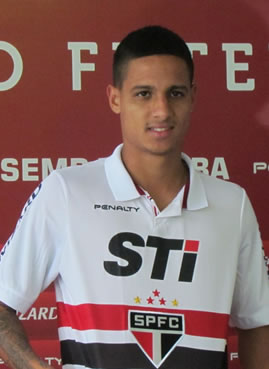

Personal information
- Full name: Ronei Gleison Rodrigues dos Reis
- Date of birth: 26 January 1991 (age 35)
- Place of birth: São José dos Campos, Brazil
- Height: 1.71 m (5 ft 7 in)
- Position: Attacking midfielder

Team information
- Current team: São Caetano

Senior career*
Years	Team	Apps	(Gls)
2012–2013	Mogi Mirim	49	(17)
2013–2019	São Paulo	8	(1)
2013	→ Goiás (loan)	20	(4)
2014	→ Coritiba (loan)	14	(1)
2014–2015	→ Ponte Preta (loan)	48	(6)
2015	→ Paysandu (loan)	11	(0)
2015–2016	→ Chiapas (loan)	0	(0)
2016	→ Ceará (loan)	11	(1)
2016–2017	→ Adanaspor (loan)	30	(8)
2017–2018	→ Belenenses (loan)	9	(1)
2018	→ Adanaspor (loan)	13	(3)
2018	→ São Bento (loan)	13	(0)
2019–2021	Adanaspor	36	(5)
2021	Ituano	11	(0)
2022–	São Caetano	2	(0)
- * Club domestic league appearances and goals as of 5 February 2022

Ronei Gleison Rodrigues dos Reis known as Roni (born 26 January 1991) is a Brazilian footballer who plays as an attacking midfielder for São Caetano in Campeonato Paulista Série A3.
