= Edson Silva (footballer, born 1986) =

Brazilian footballer

Personal information
- Full name: Edson José da Silva
- Date of birth: 9 May 1986 (age 40)
- Place of birth: Água Preta, Brazil
- Height: 1.89 m (6 ft 2 in)
- Position: Centre back

Youth career
- 2004–2006: Corinthians-AL

Senior career*
Years	Team	Apps	(Gls)
2005	Palmares-PE	27	(2)
2006–2008	Corinthians-AL	8	(0)
2007	→ CRB (loan)	37	(1)
2008	→ Botafogo (loan)	19	(0)
2009–2011	Villa Rio	0	(0)
2009	→ Fortaleza (loan)	38	(2)
2010	→ Boavista-RJ (loan)	16	(1)
2010	→ Duque de Caxias (loan)	33	(3)
2011	→ Figueirense (loan)	40	(3)
2012–2015	São Paulo	119	(7)
2016	Red Star Belgrade	7	(0)
2017	Mirassol	30	(2)
2017	→ Red Bull Brasil (loan)	4	(0)
2017	→ Londrina (loan)	24	(2)
2018	Guarani	16	(0)
2019–2022	Novorizontino	69	(4)
2022–2023	América de Natal	30	(3)
- * Club domestic league appearances and goals as of 26 August 2023

Edson José da Silva (born 9 May 1986), or simply Edson Silva, is a Brazilian professional footballer who plays as a central defender.

He previously played five consecutive seasons with São Paulo in the Campeonato Brasileiro Série A.

== Honours ==
São Paulo

- Copa Sudamericana: 2012

Red Star Belgrade

- Serbian SuperLiga: 2015–16

Londrina

- Primeira Liga: 2017
