= 2012 São Paulo FC season =

São Paulo
2012 season
- Chairman: Juvenal Juvêncio
- Manager: Emerson Leão (until 26 June); Milton Cruz (caretaker manager); Ney Franco
- Stadium: Estádio do Morumbi
- Série A: 4th
- Campeonato Paulista: Semi-finals
- Copa do Brasil: Semi-finals
- Copa Sudamericana: Champions (1st title)
- Top goalscorer: League: Luís Fabiano (17 goals); All: Luís Fabiano (32 goals)
- Highest home attendance: 67,042 (v Tigre in the Copa Sudamericana)
- Lowest home attendance: 4,740 (v Catanduvense in the Campeonato Paulista)
Home colours	Away colours

The 2012 season was São Paulo's 83rd year since the club's existence. After finishing the national league in sixth position in previous season, the team was not able to take part on Copa Libertadores for the second year consecutive thus participating in national cup, Copa do Brasil. In Campeonato Paulista, the team reached semifinals for a straight third year losing to Santos in their own field, the rival was consecrated champion in all these years. In the Copa do Brasil, Tricolor was also defeated in the same stage, this time for Cortiba, after lose the second match by 2–0, remaining an aggregate score of 2–1 to opponent. However the second half of season bring great results for The Dearest, finishing 4th position in league and an international title of Copa Sudamericana in the end of year. The Tricolor won the trophy for the first time against Argentine club Tigre in a troubled match that opponent refused to play the second half of final match in Morumbi. São Paulo was winning by 2–0, goals by Lucas at 22' and Osvaldo at 28' when referee whistled the final of match without return of Argentines to field, was the 12th international official title in Tricolor's history.

== Players ==
=== Current squad ===
Note: Flags indicate national team as defined under FIFA eligibility rules; some limited exceptions apply. Players may hold more than one non-FIFA nationality.

No.	Pos.	Nation	Player
1	GK	BRA	Rogério Ceni (captain)
3	DF	BRA	Rafael Toloi
4	DF	BRA	Rhodolfo (3rd captain)
5	MF	BRA	Wellington
6	DF	BRA	Cortez
7	FW	BRA	Lucas
8	MF	BRA	Paulo Henrique Ganso
9	FW	BRA	Luís Fabiano (vice-captain)
10	MF	BRA	Jádson
11	FW	BRA	Ademilson
12	MF	BRA	Paulo Assunção
13	DF	BRA	Paulo Miranda
14	DF	BRA	Edson Silva
15	MF	BRA	Denílson (on loan from Arsenal)
16	MF	BRA	Cícero
17	FW	BRA	Osvaldo

No.	Pos.	Nation	Player
18	MF	BRA	Maicon
19	FW	BRA	Willian José
20	MF	ARG	Marcelo Cañete
21	DF	BRA	João Filipe
22	GK	BRA	Denis
23	DF	BRA	Douglas
25	MF	BRA	Rodrigo Caio
26	DF	BRA	Henrique Miranda
28	MF	BRA	Casemiro
30	DF	BRA	Luiz Eduardo
31	DF	BRA	Lucas Farias
32	DF	BRA	Danilo
36	MF	BRA	João Schmidt
40	GK	BRA	Léo
41	GK	BRA	Leonardo
—	MF	BRA	Fabrício

=== Out on loan ===
Note: Flags indicate national team as defined under FIFA eligibility rules; some limited exceptions apply. Players may hold more than one non-FIFA nationality.

No.	Pos.	Nation	Player
—	DF	BRA	Alex Cazumba (on loan to XV de Piracicaba)
—	MF	BRA	Dener (on loan to Paulista)
—	FW	BRA	Thiago Biriça (on loan to São Carlos)
—	DF	BRA	Thiago Carleto (on loan to Fluminense)
—	GK	BRA	Richard Costa (on loan to Paulista)
—	FW	BRA	Eric (on loan to Rio Preto)
—	MF	BRA	Carlinhos Paraíba (on loan to Omiya Ardija)
—	FW	BRA	Roni (on loan to Gyeongnam FC)
—	FW	BRA	Henrique (on loan to Granada)
35	MF	BRA	Juninho (on loan to Los Angeles Galaxy)
—	MF	BRA	Cléber Santana (on loan to Avaí)
—	DF	BRA	Juan (on loan to Santos)
34	DF	BRA	Bruno Uvini (from Tottenham Hotspur)
—	MF	BRA	Sergio Mota (on loan to Santo André)
—	DF	BRA	Lucas Mendes (on loan to Santo André)
—	FW	BRA	Mazola (on loan to Hangzhou Greentown)
2	DF	PAR	Iván Piris (on loan to Roma)
27	FW	BRA	Rafinha (on loan to Guarani)
37	MF	BRA	Dener (on loan to Guarani)

=== Transfers ===
==== In ====
Note: Flags indicate national team as defined under FIFA eligibility rules; some limited exceptions apply. Players may hold more than one non-FIFA nationality.

No.	Pos.	Nation	Player
6	DF	BRA	Cortez (from Botafogo)
8	MF	BRA	Fabrício (from Cruzeiro)
18	MF	BRA	Maicon (from Figueirense)
14	DF	BRA	Édson Silva (from Figueirense)
13	DF	BRA	Paulo Miranda (from Bahia)
10	MF	BRA	Jádson (from Shakhtar Donetsk)
17	FW	BRA	Osvaldo (from Al-Ahli Dubai)
23	DF	BRA	Douglas (from Goiás)
3	DF	BRA	Rafael Toloi (from Goiás)
12	MF	BRA	Paulo Assunção (from Atlético Madrid)
8	MF	BRA	Paulo Henrique Ganso (from Santos)

==== Out ====
Note: Flags indicate national team as defined under FIFA eligibility rules; some limited exceptions apply. Players may hold more than one non-FIFA nationality.

No.	Pos.	Nation	Player
—	MF	BRA	Rivaldo (return to Mogi Mirim)
—	FW	BRA	Dagoberto (to Internacional)
—	DF	BRA	Xandão (to Sporting)
—	MF	BRA	Marlos (to Metalist Kharkiv)
—	MF	BRA	Jean (to Fluminense)
12	FW	BRA	Fernandinho (to Al-Jazira)
34	DF	BRA	Bruno Uvini (to Napoli)

== Statistics ==
=== Appearances and goals ===
No.	Pos	Nat	Player	Total		Campeonato Paulista		Copa do Brasil		Campeonato Brasileiro		Copa Sudamericana	
No.	Pos	Nat	Player	Apps	Goals	Apps	Goals	Apps	Goals	Apps	Goals	Apps	Goals
1	GK	(Brazil) BRA	Rogério Ceni	34	4	0+0	0	0+0	0	24+0	3	10+0	1
2	DF	(Paraguay) PAR	Piris	21	0	15+1	0	2+0	0	1+2	0	0+0	0
3	DF	(Brazil) BRA	Rafael Toloi	36	3	0+0	0	0+0	0	26+0	1	10+0	2
4	DF	(Brazil) BRA	Rhodolfo	69	6	20+0	5	9+0	1	30+0	0	10+0	0
5	MF	(Brazil) BRA	Wellington	28	1	6+0	1	0+0	0	10+4	0	7+1	0
6	DF	(Brazil) BRA	Cortez	74	2	20+0	0	9+0	1	35+0	1	10+0	0
7	FW	(Brazil) BRA	Lucas	60	16	21+0	6	9+0	2	21+0	6	9+0	2
8	MF	(Brazil) BRA	Fabrício	4	0	3+0	0	0+0	0	1+0	0	0+0	0
8	MF	(Brazil) BRA	Ganso	5	0	0+0	0	0+0	0	2+1	0	0+2	0
9	FW	(Brazil) BRA	Luís Fabiano	44	31	8+0	5	9+0	8	22+0	17	5+0	1
10	MF	(Brazil) BRA	Jádson	69	10	16+1	2	6+1	1	35+0	5	10+0	2
11	FW	(Brazil) BRA	Ademilson^{1}	32	4	0+2	0	0+1	0	9+14	3	4+2	1
12	FW	(Brazil) BRA	Fernandinho	29	5	9+8	5	4+2	0	2+4	0	0+0	0
12	MF	(Brazil) BRA	Paulo Assunção	11	0	0+0	0	0+0	0	7+4	0	0+0	0
13	DF	(Brazil) BRA	Paulo Miranda	49	2	16+0	0	5+0	0	19+1	2	7+1	0
14	DF	(Brazil) BRA	Edson Silva	26	1	5+2	1	4+1	0	8+4	0	0+2	0
15	MF	(Brazil) BRA	Denílson	65	1	15+2	0	8+0	0	31+0	1	9+0	0
16	MF	(Brazil) BRA	Cícero	61	9	20+0	5	9+0	1	14+16	3	1+1	0
17	FW	(Brazil) BRA	Osvaldo	47	11	1+11	1	0+3	1	18+6	8	7+1	1
18	MF	(Brazil) BRA	Maicon	59	7	3+11	0	0+8	1	23+9	5	4+1	1
19	FW	(Brazil) BRA	Willian José	44	15	12+2	11	0+4	0	8+11	1	3+4	3
20	MF	(Argentina) ARG	Cañete	2	0	0+0	0	0+0	0	0+2	0	0+0	0
21	DF	(Brazil) BRA	João Filipe	22	0	3+4	0	0+2	0	11+1	0	1+0	0
22	GK	(Brazil) BRA	Denis	44	0	21+0	0	9+0	0	14+0	0	0+0	0
23	DF	(Brazil) BRA	Douglas	44	3	0+0	0	5+0	1	29+4	2	3+3	0
25	MF	(Brazil) BRA	Rodrigo Caio	20	0	5+4	0	2+1	0	3+4	0	1+0	0
26	DF	(Brazil) BRA	Henrique Miranda	3	0	1+0	0	0+0	0	2+0	0	0+0	0
27	FW	(Brazil) BRA	Rafinha	8	0	0+3	0	0+1	0	1+3	0	0+0	0
28	MF	(Brazil) BRA	Casemiro	49	3	11+7	2	8+1	1	10+11	0	0+1	0
30	DF	(Brazil) BRA	Luiz Eduardo	1	0	0+1	0	0+0	0	0+0	0	0+0	0
31	DF	(Brazil) BRA	Lucas Farias	2	0	0+0	0	0+0	0	1+1	0	0+0	0
32	DF	(Brazil) BRA	Danilo	0	0	0+0	0	0+0	0	0+0	0	0+0	0
34	DF	(Brazil) BRA	Bruno Uvini	1	0	0+0	0	1+0	0	0+0	0	0+0	0
35	MF	(Brazil) BRA	Juninho	0	0	0+0	0	0+0	0	0+0	0	0+0	0
36	MF	(Brazil) BRA	João Schmidt	6	0	0+0	0	0+0	0	1+4	0	0+1	0
40	GK	(Brazil) BRA	Léo	0	0	0+0	0	0+0	0	0+0	0	0+0	0
41	GK	(Brazil) BRA	Leonardo	0	0	0+0	0	0+0	0	0+0	0	0+0	0

^{1}Ademilson became nº 11 during the season. Before he was nº 29

=== Top scorers ===
Position	Nation	Playing position	Name	Campeonato Paulista	Copa do Brasil	Campeonato Brasileiro	Copa Sudamericana	Total
1	(Brazil)	FW	Luís Fabiano	5	8	17	1	31
2	(Brazil)	FW	Lucas	6	2	6	2	16
3	(Brazil)	FW	Willian José	11	0	1	3	15
4	(Brazil)	FW	Osvaldo	1	1	8	1	11
5	(Brazil)	MF	Jádson	2	1	5	2	10
6	(Brazil)	MF	Cícero	5	1	3	0	9
7	(Brazil)	MF	Maicon	0	1	5	1	7
8	(Brazil)	DF	Rhodolfo	5	1	0	0	6
9	(Brazil)	FW	Fernandinho	5	0	0	0	5
10	(Brazil)	FW	Ademilson	0	0	3	1	4
=	(Brazil)	GK	Rogério Ceni	0	0	3	1	4
12	(Brazil)	MF	Casemiro	2	1	0	0	3
=	(Brazil)	DF	Douglas	0	1	2	0	3
=	(Brazil)	DF	Rafael Toloi	0	0	1	2	3
15	(Brazil)	DF	Cortez	0	1	1	0	2
=	(Brazil)	DF	Paulo Miranda	0	0	2	0	2
17	(Brazil)	MF	Denílson	0	0	1	0	1
=	(Brazil)	DF	Edson Silva	1	0	0	0	1
=	(Brazil)	MF	Wellington	1	0	0	0	1
/	/	/	Own goals	3	0	1	1	5
			Total	47	18	59	15	139

=== Top assists ===
Position	Nation	Playing position	Name	Campeonato Paulista	Copa do Brasil	Campeonato Brasileiro	Copa Sudamericana	Total
1	(Brazil)	MF	Jádson	8	1	10	0	19
2	(Brazil)	FW	Lucas	4	2	6	3	15
3	(Brazil)	MF	Casemiro	6	2	0	0	8
4	(Brazil)	FW	Osvaldo	1	0	4	1	6
5	(Brazil)	DF	Cortez	1	1	2	1	5
=	(Brazil)	FW	Luís Fabiano	1	2	2	0	5
7	(Brazil)	MF	Denílson	2	0	1	1	4
=	(Brazil)	FW	Fernandinho	4	0	0	0	4
9	(Brazil)	MF	Cícero	1	2	0	0	3
10	(Brazil)	MF	Ganso	0	0	2	0	2
=	(Brazil)	DF	Rhodolfo	0	0	1	1	2
=	(Brazil)	MF	Rodrigo Caio	1	0	1	0	2
13	(Brazil)	DF	Douglas	0	0	1	0	1
=	(Brazil)	FW	Ademilson	0	0	1	0	1
=	(Brazil)	MF	Maicon	0	0	1	0	1
=	(Brazil)	DF	Paulo Miranda	0	0	1	0	1
=	(Brazil)	MF	Wellington	0	0	0	1	1
=	(Brazil)	FW	Willian José	0	0	1	0	1
			Total	29	10	34	8	81

=== Disciplinary record ===
Position	Nation	Number	Name	Campeonato Paulista			Copa do Brasil			Campeonato Brasileiro			Copa Sudamericana			Total		
Position	Nation	Number	Name	Booked	Double yellow card	Sent off (straight red)	Booked	Double yellow card	Sent off (straight red)	Booked	Double yellow card	Sent off (straight red)	Booked	Double yellow card	Sent off (straight red)	Booked	Double yellow card	Sent off (straight red)
GK	(Brazil)	1	Rogério Ceni	0	0	0	0	0	0	2	0	0	3	0	0	5	0	0
DF	(Paraguay)	2	Iván Piris	5	0	0	0	0	0	0	0	0	0	0	0	5	0	0
DF	(Brazil)	3	Rafael Toloi	0	0	0	0	0	0	8	0	0	2	0	0	10	0	0
DF	(Brazil)	4	Rhodolfo	2	0	0	1	0	0	5	1	0	3	0	0	11	1	0
MF	(Brazil)	5	Wellington	3	0	0	0	0	0	7	0	0	5	0	0	15	0	0
DF	(Brazil)	6	Cortez	1	0	0	1	0	0	5	0	0	2	0	0	9	0	0
FW	(Brazil)	7	Lucas	0	0	0	3	0	0	4	0	0	1	0	0	8	0	0
MF	(Brazil)	8	Fabrício	0	0	0	0	0	0	0	0	0	0	0	0	0	0	0'
MF	(Brazil)	8	PH Ganso	0	0	0	0	0	0	0	0	0	0	0	0	0	0	0
FW	(Brazil)	9	Luís Fabiano	3	0	0	1	0	0	9	1	0	1	0	1	14	1	1
MF	(Brazil)	10	Jádson	1	0	0	0	0	0	3	0	0	0	0	0	4	0	0
FW	(Brazil)	11	Ademilson	0	0	0	0	0	0	2	0	0	0	0	0	2	0	0
FW	(Brazil)	12	Fernandinho	4	0	0	1	0	0	0	0	0	0	0	0	5	0	0
MF	(Brazil)	12	Paulo Assunção	0	0	0	0	0	0	3	0	0	0	0	0	3	0	0
DF	(Brazil)	13	Paulo Miranda	5	1	0	3	1	0	5	0	0	0	0	1	13	2	1
DF	(Brazil)	14	Edson Silva	0	0	0	0	0	0	2	0	0	0	0	0	2	0	0
MF	(Brazil)	15	Denílson	5	0	0	4	0	0	10	1	0	4	0	0	23	1	0
MF	(Brazil)	16	Cícero	3	1	0	1	0	0	1	0	0	0	0	0	5	1	0
FW	(Brazil)	17	Osvaldo	1	0	0	0	0	0	2	0	0	2	0	0	5	0	0
MF	(Brazil)	18	Maicon	1	0	0	0	0	0	6	0	0	1	0	0	8	0	0
FW	(Brazil)	19	Willian José	0	0	1	0	0	0	1	1	0	0	0	0	1	1	1
MF	(Argentina)	20	Marcelo Cañete	0	0	0	0	0	0	0	0	0	0	0	0	0	0	0
DF	(Brazil)	21	João Filipe	2	0	1	0	0	0	5	0	0	0	0	0	7	0	1
GK	(Brazil)	22	Denis	0	0	0	0	0	0	1	0	0	0	0	0	1	0	0
DF	(Brazil)	23	Douglas	0	0	0	2	0	0	7	0	1	1	0	0	10	0	1
MF	(Brazil)	25	Rodrigo Caio	3	1	0	0	0	0	2	1	0	1	0	0	6	2	0
DF	(Brazil)	26	Henrique Miranda	0	0	0	0	0	0	0	0	0	0	0	0	0	0	0
FW	(Brazil)	27	Rafinha	0	0	0	0	0	0	0	0	0	0	0	0	0	0	0
MF	(Brazil)	28	Casemiro	4	1	0	2	0	0	3	0	0	0	0	0	9	1	0
DF	(Brazil)	30	Luiz Eduardo	0	0	0	0	0	0	0	0	0	0	0	0	0	0	0
DF	(Brazil)	32	Danilo	0	0	0	0	0	0	0	0	0	0	0	0	0	0	0
DF	(Brazil)	34	Bruno Uvini	0	0	0	0	0	0	0	0	0	0	0	0	0	0	0
MF	(Brazil)	35	Juninho	0	0	0	0	0	0	0	0	0	0	0	0	0	0	0
DF	(Brazil)	31	Lucas Farias	0	0	0	0	0	0	0	0	0	0	0	0	0	0	0
MF	(Brazil)	36	João Schmidt	0	0	0	0	0	0	0	0	0	0	0	0	0	0	0
GK	(Brazil)	40	Léo	0	0	0	0	0	0	0	0	0	0	0	0	0	0	0
GK	(Brazil)	41	Leonardo	0	0	0	0	0	0	0	0	0	0	0	0	0	0	0
			Total	43	4	2	19	1	0	93	5	1	26	0	2	181	10	5

Last updated: 12 December 2012
Source: Competitive matches and FPF
Ordered by (red card) , (second yellow card) and (yellow card)
(yellow card) = Number of bookings; (second yellow card) = Number of sending offs after a second yellow card; (red card) = Number of sending offs by a direct red card.

=== Managers performance ===
Name	Nationality	From	To	P	W	D	L	GF	GA	Win%
Emerson Leão	Brazil	22 January	23 June	36	23	5	8	70	39	68,51%
Milton Cruz (caretaker)	Brazil	30 June	8 July	2	2	0	0	6	3	100%
Ney Franco	Brazil	15 July	12 December	40	20	11	9	63	30	59,16%

== Competitions ==
=== Overall ===
Games played	78 (21 Campeonato Paulista, 9 Copa do Brasil, 38 Campeonato Brasileiro, 10 Copa Sudamericana)
Games won	45 (14 Campeonato Paulista, 6 Copa do Brasil, 20 Campeonato Brasileiro, 5 Copa Sudamericana)
Games drawn	16 (4 Campeonato Paulista, 1 Copa do Brasil, 6 Campeonato Brasileiro, 5 Copa Sudamericana)
Games lost	17 (3 Campeonato Paulista, 2 Copa do Brasil, 12 Campeonato Brasileiro, 0 Copa Sudamericana)
Goals scored	139
Goals conceded	72
Goal difference	+67
Yellow cards	181
Second yellow cards	10
Red cards	5
Worst discipline	Denílson (23 (yellow card) , 1, 0 (red card) )
Best result	5–0 (H) v Universidad de Chile - Copa Sudamericana - 2012.11.07
Worst result	0–3 (A) v Náutico - Campeonato Brasileiro - 2012.08.15
Most appearances	Cortez (74)
Top scorer	Luís Fabiano (31)

Source: São Paulo FC

=== Campeonato Paulista ===
==== Results summary ====
Overall								Home						Away					
Pld	W	D	L	GF	GA	GD	Pts	W	D	L	GF	GA	GD	W	D	L	GF	GA	GD
21	14	4	3	47	25	+22	46	9	2	1	28	11	+17	5	2	2	19	14	+5

==== First phase ====
22 January Round 1	São Paulo	4–0	Botafogo	São Paulo
17:00 UTC−02:00	Rhodolfo 36'; Cícero 42'; Edson Silva 56'; Márcio 75' (o.g.)	Report (pt)		Stadium: Estádio Cícero Pompeu de Toledo (Morumbi); Attendance: 16,346; Referee: Robério Pereira Pires

25 January Round 2	Oeste	2–3	São Paulo	Presidente Prudente
19:30 UTC−02:00	Tadeu 27', 90+1'	Report (pt)	Cris 31' (o.g.); Wellington 33'; Lucas 77'	Stadium: Estádio Eduardo José Farah (Prudentão); Attendance: 8,001; Referee: Marcelo Rogério

28 January Round 3	São Paulo	2–1	São Caetano	São Paulo
17:00 UTC−02:00	Luís Fabiano 15'; Lucas 77'	Report (pt)	Moradei 17'	Stadium: Estádio Cícero Pompeu de Toledo (Morumbi); Attendance: 13,218; Referee: Welton Orlando Wohnrath

2 February Round 4	São Paulo	1–1	Guarani	São Paulo
19:30 UTC−02:00	Willian José 38'	Report (pt)	Fumagalli 1'	Stadium: Estádio Cícero Pompeu de Toledo (Morumbi); Attendance: 9,407; Referee: Cássio Luiz Zancopé

5 February Round 5	Ponte Preta	1–3	São Paulo	Campinas
19:30 UTC−02:00	Guilherme 52'	Report (pt)	Willian José 4', 74'; Lucas 65'	Stadium: Estádio Moisés Lucarelli; Attendance: 8,415; Referee: Vinícius Furlan

8 February Round 6	São Paulo	1–1	Comercial	São Paulo
21:50 UTC−02:00	Willian José 5'	Report (pt)	Jaílton 46'	Stadium: Estádio Cícero Pompeu de Toledo (Morumbi); Attendance: 8,185; Referee: Leandro Bizzio Marinho

12 February Round 7	Corinthians	1–0	São Paulo	São Paulo
17:00 UTC−02:00	Danilo 21'	Report (pt)		Stadium: Estádio Municipal Paulo Machado de Carvalho (Pacaembu); Attendance: 27,776; Referee: Raphael Claus

16 February Round 8	São Paulo	3–1	Paulista	São Paulo
19:30 UTC−02:00	Willian José 12' (pen.), 18', 76'	Report (pt)	Reinaldo 81'	Stadium: Estádio Cícero Pompeu de Toledo (Morumbi); Attendance: 5,825; Referee: Flavio Rodrigues de Souza

22 February Round 9	Bragantino	3–3	São Paulo	Bragança Paulista
22:00 UTC−02:00	Giancarlo 8'; Fernando Gabriel 24'; Romarinho 60'	Report (pt)	Jádson 27' (pen.); Cícero 36', 59'	Stadium: Estádio Nabi Abi Chedid; Attendance: 8,180; Referee: Guilherme Ceretta de Lima

26 February Round 10	Palmeiras	3–3	São Paulo	Presidente Prudente
16:00 UTC−03:00	Daniel Carvalho 5'; Barcos 37', 71'	Report (pt)	Cícero 30'; Willian José 54' (pen.); Fernandinho 75'	Stadium: Estádio Municipal Eduardo José Farah (Prudentão); Attendance: 19,161; Referee: Wilson Luiz Seneme

1 March Round 11	São Paulo	3–0	Guaratinguetá	São Paulo
19:30 UTC−03:00	Lucas 42'; Willian José 59'; Fernandinho 62'	Report (pt)		Stadium: Estádio Cícero Pompeu de Toledo (Morumbi); Attendance: 6,229; Referee: Luiz Vanderlei Martinucho

4 March Round 12	XV de Piracicaba	0–1	São Paulo	Piracicaba
18:30 UTC−03:00		Report (pt)	Cícero 89'	Stadium: Estádio Barão da Serra Negra; Attendance: 13,982; Referee: Júnior César Lossávaro

11 March Round 13	São Paulo	2–1	Portuguesa	São Paulo
16:00 UTC−03:00	Jádson 49'; Luís Fabiano 71'	Report (pt)	Ricardo Jesus 47'	Stadium: Estádio Cícero Pompeu de Toledo (Morumbi); Attendance: 16,883; Referee: Flávio Rodrigues Guerra

18 March Round 14	São Paulo	3–2	Santos	São Paulo
16:00 UTC−03:00	Casemiro 8'; Luís Fabiano 64' (pen.); Lucas 86'	Report (pt)	Edu Dracena 51'; Neymar 76'	Stadium: Estádio Cícero Pompeu de Toledo (Morumbi); Attendance: 31,972; Referee: Marcelo Aparecido Ribeiro de Souza

25 March Round 15	Mirassol	0–1	São Paulo	Mirassol
18:30 UTC−03:00		Report (pt)	Rhodolfo 63'	Stadium: Estádio José Maria de Campos Maia; Attendance: 10,651; Referee: Luiz Vanderlei Martinucho

29 March Round 16	São Paulo	2–0	Grêmio Catanduvense	Barueri
19:30 UTC−03:00	Fernandinho 74'; Cléber 90+3' (o.g.)	Report (pt)		Stadium: Arena Barueri; Attendance: 4,740; Referee: Claudinei Forati Silva

1 April Round 17	Ituano	2–4	São Paulo	Itu
18:30 UTC−03:00	Anderson Salles 9'; Rhodolfo 31' (o.g.)	Report (pt)	Rhodolfo 55', 59'; Lucas 66'; Willian José 75'	Stadium: Estádio Novelli Júnior; Attendance: 10,521; Referee: Rodrigo Braghetto

8 April Round 18	São Paulo	2–0	Mogi Mirim	Barueri
18:30 UTC−03:00	Casemiro 29'; Fernandinho 39'	Report (pt)		Stadium: Arena Barueri; Attendance: 12,919; Referee: Vinícius Furlan

15 April Round 19	Linense	2–1	São Paulo	Lins
16:00 UTC−03:00	Andrade 9'; Paulo Miranda 44' (o.g.)	Report (pt)	Rhodolfo 23'	Stadium: Estádio Municipal Gilberto Siqueira Lopes (Gilbertão); Attendance: 8,410; Referee: Luiz Vanderlei Martinucho

==== Quarter-final ====
21 April Single match	São Paulo	4–1	Bragantino	São Paulo
18:30 UTC−03:00	Fernandinho 19'; Luís Fabiano 52', 68'; Osvaldo 83'	Report (pt)	Júnior Lopes 64'	Stadium: Estádio Cícero Pompeu de Toledo (Morumbi); Attendance: 25,555; Referee: Wilson Luiz Seneme

==== Semi-final ====
29 April Single match	São Paulo	1–3	Santos	São Paulo
16:00 UTC−03:00	Willian José 63'	Report (pt)	Neymar 3' (pen.), 31', 77'	Stadium: Estádio Cícero Pompeu de Toledo (Morumbi); Attendance: 48,479; Referee: Paulo César de Oliveira

=== Copa do Brasil ===
==== Results summary ====
Overall								Home						Away					
Pld	W	D	L	GF	GA	GD	Pts	W	D	L	GF	GA	GD	W	D	L	GF	GA	GD
9	6	1	2	18	8	+10	19	4	0	0	10	1	+9	2	1	2	8	7	+1

==== First phase ====
7 March First leg	Independente	0–1	São Paulo	Belém
22:00 UTC−03:00		Report (pt)	Cícero 14'	Stadium: Estádio Olímpico do Pará (Mangueirão); Attendance: 22,184; Referee: Suelson Diógenes de França Medeiros

14 March Second leg	São Paulo	4–0 (5–0 agg.)	Independente	São Paulo
19:30 UTC−03:00	Luís Fabiano 31', 33', 54', 64'	Report (pt)		Stadium: Estádio Cícero Pompeu de Toledo (Morumbi); Attendance: 15,404; Referee: Elmo Alves Resende Cunha

==== Second phase ====
11 April First leg	Bahia de Feira	2–5 ( Eliminated second leg )	São Paulo	Feira de Santana
21:50 UTC−03:00	Carlinhos 29'; João Neto 84' (pen.)	Report (pt)	Rhodolfo 9'; Luís Fabiano 35' (pen.), 58' (pen.); Maicon 78'; Osvaldo 87'	Stadium: Estádio Municipal Alberto Oliveira (Joia da Princesa); Attendance: 15,834; Referee: Marcos André Gomes da Penha

==== Round of 16 ====
2 May First leg	Ponte Preta	1–0	São Paulo	Campinas
21:50 UTC−03:00	Roger 61'	Report (pt)		Stadium: Estádio Moisés Lucarelli; Attendance: 6,965; Referee: Luiz Flavio de Oliveira

10 May Second leg	São Paulo	3–1 (3–2 agg.)	Ponte Preta	São Paulo
21:50 UTC−03:00	Casemiro 38'; Lucas 40'; Luís Fabiano 66'	Report (pt)	Somália 12'	Stadium: Estádio Cícero Pompeu de Toledo (Morumbi); Attendance: 26,438; Referee: Marcelo Aparecido de Souza

==== Quarter-finals ====
16 May First leg	São Paulo	2–0	Goiás	São Paulo
21:50 UTC−03:00	Luís Fabiano 31'; Douglas 50'	Report (pt)		Stadium: Estádio Cícero Pompeu de Toledo (Morumbi); Attendance: 21,567; Referee: Jean Pierre Gonçalves Lima

23 May Second leg	Goiás	2–2 (2–4 agg.)	São Paulo	Goiânia
21:50 UTC−03:00	Ricardo Goulart 28'; Egídio 81'	Report (pt)	Jádson 29'; Cortez 61'	Stadium: Estádio do Governo do Estado de Goiás (Serra Dourada); Attendance: 23,992; Referee: Fabrício Neves Correa

==== Semi-finals ====
14 June First leg	São Paulo	1–0	Coritiba	São Paulo
21:00 UTC−03:00	Lucas 88'	Report (pt)		Stadium: Estádio Cícero Pompeu de Toledo (Morumbi); Attendance: 40,885; Referee: Ricardo Marques Ribeiro

20 June Second leg	Coritiba	2–0 (2–1 agg.)	São Paulo	Curitiba
21:50 UTC−03:00	Émerson 28'; Éverton Ribeiro 61'	Report (pt)		Stadium: Estádio Major Antônio Couto Pereira; Attendance: 25,485; Referee: Wilton Pereira Sampaio

=== Campeonato Brasileiro ===
==== Results summary ====
Overall								Home						Away					
Pld	W	D	L	GF	GA	GD	Pts	W	D	L	GF	GA	GD	W	D	L	GF	GA	GD
38	20	6	12	59	37	+22	66	15	2	2	37	10	+27	5	4	10	22	27	−5

==== Results by round ====
Round	1	2	3	4	5	6	7	8	9	10	11	12	13	14	15	16	17	18	19	20	21	22	23	24	25	26	27	28	29	30	31	32	33	34	35	36	37	38
Ground	A	H	A	H	H	A	A	H	A	H	A	A	H	H	A	H	A	H	A	H	A	H	A	A	H	H	A	H	A	H	H	A	A	H	A	H	A	H
Result	L	W	L	W	W	L	W	W	D	L	W	L	W	W	L	L	L	W	W	W	L	D	D	L	W	W	D	W	W	W	W	L	W	D	L	W	D	W
Position	19	8	11	7	6	8	6	4	5	7	6	7	7	6	6	7	8	6	5	5	5	5	6	6	5	5	5	5	5	4	4	4	4	4	4	4	4	4

Updated to match(es) played on 26 August. Source: São Paulo FC.net
A = Away; H = Home; W = Win; D = Draw; L = Loss

==== Matches ====
20 May Round 1	Botafogo	4–2	São Paulo	Rio de Janeiro
16:00 UTC−03:00	Herrera 49', 67' (pen.), 77'; Vitor Júnior 72'	Report (pt)	Jádson 11'; Luís Fabiano 61'	Stadium: Estádio Olímpico João Havelange (Engenhão); Attendance: 7,008; Referee: Sandro Meira Ricci

27 May Round 2	São Paulo	1–0	Bahia	São Paulo
16:00 UTC−03:00	Luís Fabiano 57'	Report (pt)		Stadium: Estádio Cícero Pompeu de Toledo (Morumbi); Attendance: 10,305; Referee: Wagner Reway

6 June Round 3	Internacional	1–0	São Paulo	Porto Alegre
21:50 UTC−03:00	D'Alessandro 20'	Report (pt)		Stadium: Estádio José Pinheiro Borda (Beira-Rio); Attendance: 12,348; Referee: Wilton Pereira Sampaio

10 June Round 4	São Paulo	1–0	Santos	São Paulo
18:30 UTC−03:00	Paulo Miranda 7'	Report (pt)		Stadium: Estádio Cícero Pompeu de Toledo (Morumbi); Attendance: 6,505; Referee: Flávio Rodrigues Guerra

17 June Round 5	São Paulo	1–0	Atlético Mineiro	São Paulo
16:00 UTC−03:00	Luís Fabiano 41'	Report (pt)		Stadium: Estádio Cícero Pompeu de Toledo (Morumbi); Attendance: 10,981; Referee: Elmo Alves Resende Cunha

23 June Round 6	Portuguesa	1–0	São Paulo	São Paulo
18:30 UTC−03:00	Ivan 55'	Report (pt)		Stadium: Estádio Oswaldo Teixeira Duarte (Canindé); Attendance: 4,544; Referee: Herman Brumel Vani

30 June Round 7	Cruzeiro	2–3	São Paulo	Belo Horizonte
16:20 UTC−03:00	Rafael Donato 12', 53'	Report (pt)	Luís Fabiano 11'; Lucas 15'; Jádson 48'	Stadium: Estádio Raimundo Sampaio (Independência); Attendance: 17,695; Referee: Marcelo de Lima Henrique

8 July Round 8	São Paulo	3–1	Coritiba	São Paulo
16:00 UTC−03:00	Jádson 14'; Maicon 40'; Osvaldo 79'	Report (pt)	Robinho 70' (pen.)	Stadium: Estádio Cícero Pompeu de Toledo (Morumbi); Attendance: 22,127; Referee: Francisco Carlos Nascimento

15 July Round 9	Palmeiras	1–1	São Paulo	Barueri
18:30 UTC−03:00	Mazinho 81'	Report (pt)	Luís Fabiano 12'	Stadium: Arena Barueri; Attendance: 8,374; Referee: Pericles Bassols Pegado Cortez

18 July Round 10	São Paulo	0–1	Vasco da Gama	São Paulo
21:50 UTC−03:00		Report (pt)	Fágner 48'	Stadium: Estádio Cícero Pompeu de Toledo (Morumbi); Attendance: 10,428; Referee: Leandro Pedro Vuaden

22 July Round 11	Figueirense	0–2	São Paulo	Florianópolis
16:00 UTC−03:00		Report (pt)	Ademilson 1'; Willian José 90+4'	Stadium: Estádio Orlando Scarpelli; Attendance: 9,445; Referee: Anderson Daronco

25 July Round 12	Atlético Goianiense	4–3	São Paulo	Goiânia
21:50 UTC−03:00	Marino 16'; Márcio 25' (pen.); Patric 30'; Wesley 43'	Report (pt)	Ademilson 41'; Jádson 49' (pen.); Toloi 62'	Stadium: Estádio do Governo do Estado de Goiás (Serra Dourada); Attendance: 6,236; Referee: Emerson de Almeida Ferreira

29 July Round 13	São Paulo	4–1	Flamengo	São Paulo
16:00 UTC−03:00	Maicon 41'; Luís Fabiano 45+1', 59'; Jádson 90+3'	Report (pt)	Ramon 66'	Stadium: Estádio Cícero Pompeu de Toledo (Morumbi); Attendance: 35,049; Referee: Jailson Macedo Freitas

5 August Round 14	São Paulo	1–0	Sport	São Paulo
16:00 UTC−03:00	Ademilson 78'	Report (pt)		Stadium: Estádio Cícero Pompeu de Toledo (Morumbi); Attendance: 23,492; Referee: André Luiz de Freitas Castro

9 August Round 15	Fluminense	2–1	São Paulo	Rio de Janeiro
21:00 UTC−03:00	Leandro Euzebio 35'; Fred 49'	Report (pt)	Cícero 43'	Stadium: Estádio Vasco da Gama (São Januário); Attendance: 5,799; Referee: Heber Roberto Lopes

12 August Round 16	São Paulo	1–2	Grêmio	São Paulo
16:00 UTC−03:00	Cícero 40'	Report (pt)	Werley 66'; André Lima 90+1'	Stadium: Estádio Cícero Pompeu de Toledo (Morumbi); Attendance: 15,386; Referee: Elmo Alves Resende Cunha

15 August Round 17	Náutico	3–0	São Paulo	Recife
21:50 UTC−03:00	Kieza 12' (pen.); Araújo 28'; Rogério Ceni 61' (o.g.)	Report (pt)		Stadium: Estádio Eládio de Barros Carvalho (Aflitos); Attendance: 14,022; Referee: José de Caldas Souza

18 August Round 18	São Paulo	3–0	Ponte Preta	São Paulo
21:00 UTC−03:00	Rogério Ceni 21' (pen.); Lucas 26'; Osvaldo 87'	Report (pt)		Stadium: Estádio Cícero Pompeu de Toledo (Morumbi); Attendance: 9,900; Referee: Rodrigo Guarizo F. do Amaral

26 August Round 19	Corinthians	1–2	São Paulo	São Paulo
16:00 UTC−03:00	Emerson 5'	Report (pt)	Luís Fabiano 23', 61'	Stadium: Estádio Municipal Paulo Machado de Carvalho (Pacaembu); Attendance: 36,644; Referee: Wilson Luiz Seneme

30 August Round 20	São Paulo	4–0	Botafogo	São Paulo
21:00 UTC−03:00	Luís Fabiano 5'; Osvaldo 58'; Lucas 60'; Cícero 88'	Report (pt)		Stadium: Estádio Cícero Pompeu de Toledo (Morumbi); Attendance: 15,576; Referee: Jean Pierre Gonçalves Lima

2 September Round 21	Bahia	1–0	São Paulo	Salvador
16:00 UTC−03:00	Gabriel 70'	Report (pt)		Stadium: Estádio de Pituaçu; Attendance: 25,945; Referee: Márcio Chagas da Silva

5 September Round 22	São Paulo	1–1	Internacional	São Paulo
22:00 UTC−03:00	Maicon 18'		Dagoberto 7'	Stadium: Estádio Cícero Pompeu de Toledo (Morumbi); Attendance: 14,443; Referee: Ricardo Marques Ribeiro

9 September Round 23	Santos	0–0	São Paulo	Santos
16:00 UTC−03:00				Stadium: Estádio Urbano Caldeira (Vila Belmiro); Attendance: 6,379; Referee: Marcelo Aparecido Ribeiro de Souza

12 September Round 24	Atlético Mineiro	1–0	São Paulo	Belo Horizonte
22:00 UTC−03:00	Leonardo 61'			Stadium: Estádio Raimundo Sampaio (Independência); Attendance: 18,025; Referee: Sandro Meira Ricci

15 September Round 25	São Paulo	3–1	Portuguesa	São Paulo
18:30 UTC−03:00	Osvaldo 5'; Cortez 57'; Luís Fabiano 77'	Report (pt)	Bruno Mineiro 36'	Stadium: Estádio Cícero Pompeu de Toledo (Morumbi); Attendance: 18,957; Referee: Paulo Cesar de Oliveira

23 September Round 26	São Paulo	1–0	Cruzeiro	São Paulo
16:00 UTC−03:00	Osvaldo 68'	Report (pt)		Stadium: Estádio Cícero Pompeu de Toledo (Morumbi); Attendance: 40,457; Referee: Wagner do Nascimento Magalhães

30 September Round 27	Coritiba	1–1	São Paulo	Curitiba
16:00 UTC−03:00	Éverton Ribeiro 59' (pen.)	Report (pt)	Osvaldo 84'	Stadium: Estádio Couto Pereira; Attendance: 15,061; Referee: Pericles Bassols Pegado Cortez

6 October Round 28	São Paulo	3–0	Palmeiras	São Paulo
16:00 UTC−03:00	Luís Fabiano 35', 69'; Denílson 42'	Report (pt)		Stadium: Estádio Cícero Pompeu de Toledo (Morumbi); Attendance: 34,941; Referee: Paulo César de Oliveira

10 October Round 29	Vasco da Gama	0–2	São Paulo	Rio de Janeiro
22:00 UTC−03:00		Report (pt)	Luís Fabiano 20'; Osvaldo 48'	Stadium: Estádio Vasco da Gama (São Januário); Attendance: 11,182; Referee: Elmo Alves Resende Cunha

14 October Round 30	São Paulo	2–0	Figueirense	São Paulo
16:00 UTC−03:00	Luís Fabiano 13'; Douglas 20'	Report (pt)		Stadium: Estádio Cícero Pompeu de Toledo (Morumbi); Attendance: 26,444; Referee: Leandro Pedro Vuaden

18 October Round 31	São Paulo	2–0	Atlético Goianiense	São Paulo
21:00 UTC−03:00	Paulo Miranda 28'; Osvaldo 38'	Report (pt)		Stadium: Estádio Cícero Pompeu de Toledo (Morumbi); Attendance: 27,098; Referee: Márcio Chagas da Silva

21 October Round 32	Flamengo	1–0	São Paulo	Rio de Janeiro
16:00 UTC−02:00	González 71'	Report (pt)		Stadium: Estádio Olímpico João Havelange (Engenhão); Attendance: 21,631; Referee: Leandro Pedro Vuaden

27 October Round 33	Sport	2–4	São Paulo	Recife
18:30 UTC−02:00	Gilberto 13'; Hugo 79' (pen.)	Report (pt)	Lucas 17', 29', 58'; Rivaldo 33' (o.g.)	Stadium: Estádio Adelmar da Costa Carvalho (Ilha do Retiro); Attendance: 31,599; Referee: Jaílson Macedo Freitas

4 November Round 34	São Paulo	1–1	Fluminense	São Paulo
17:00 UTC−02:00	Luís Fabiano 49'	Report (pt)	Fred 67'	Stadium: Estádio Cícero Pompeu de Toledo (Morumbi); Attendance: 54,118; Referee: Héber Roberto Lopes

11 November Round 35	Grêmio	2–1	São Paulo	Porto Alegre
17:00 UTC−02:00	André Lima 60'; Marcelo Moreno 84'	Report (pt)	Rogério Ceni 43' (pen.)	Stadium: Estádio Olímpico Monumental; Attendance: 40,217; Referee: Wilton Pereira Sampaio

18 November Round 36	São Paulo	2–1	Náutico	São Paulo
17:00 UTC−02:00	Luís Fabiano 54'; Rogério Ceni 70' (pen.)	Report (pt)	Souza 48'	Stadium: Estádio Cícero Pompeu de Toledo (Morumbi); Attendance: 62,207; Referee: Wagner Reway

25 November Round 37	Ponte Preta	0–0	São Paulo	Campinas
17:00 UTC−02:00		Report (pt)		Stadium: Estádio Moisés Lucarelli; Attendance: 9,471; Referee: Luís Flávio de Oliveira

2 December Round 38	São Paulo	3–1	Corinthians	São Paulo
17:00 UTC−02:00	Douglas 14'; Maicon 23', 76'	Report (pt)	Guerrero 12'	Stadium: Estádio Municipal Paulo Machado de Carvalho (Pacaembu); Attendance: 22,436; Referee: Rodrigo Braghetto

=== Copa Sudamericana ===
==== Results summary ====
Overall								Home						Away					
Pld	W	D	L	GF	GA	GD	Pts	W	D	L	GF	GA	GD	W	D	L	GF	GA	GD
10	5	5	0	15	2	+13	20	3	2	0	9	0	+9	2	3	0	6	2	+4

==== Second stage ====
1 August First leg	Bahia (Brazil)	0–2	(Brazil) São Paulo	Salvador
21:50 UTC−03:00		Report (es)	Rogério Ceni 7'; Ademilson 68'	Stadium: Estádio Metropolitano Roberto Santos (Pituaçu); Referee: Marcelo Henrique Lima

21 August Second leg	São Paulo (Brazil)	2–0 (4–0 agg.)	(Brazil) Bahia	São Paulo
21:15 UTC−03:00	Willian José 64'; Maicon 68'	Report (es)		Stadium: Estádio Cícero Pompeu de Toledo (Morumbi); Attendance: 10,097; Referee: Sandro Meira Ricci

==== Round of 16 ====
26 September First leg	Liga de Loja (Ecuador)	1–1	(Brazil) São Paulo	Loja
22:00 UTC−03:00	Larrea 43'		Bermúdez 36' (o.g.)	Stadium: Estadio Federativo Reina del Cisne; Attendance: 13,751; Referee: Julio Bascuñan (Chile)

24 October Second leg	São Paulo (Brazil)	0–0 (a.g.) (1–1 agg.)	(Ecuador) Liga de Loja	São Paulo
22:00 UTC−02:00		Report (pt)		Stadium: Estádio Cícero Pompeu de Toledo (Morumbi); Attendance: 15,208; Referee: Julio Quintana (Paraguay)

==== Quarter-finals ====
31 October First leg	Universidad de Chile	0–2	(Brazil) São Paulo	Santiago
21:50 UTC−02:00		Report (es)	Willian José 8', 18'	Stadium: Estadio Nacional; Referee: Martín Vázquez (Uruguay)

7 November Second leg	São Paulo (Brazil)	5–0 (7–0 agg.)	Universidad de Chile	São Paulo
21:50 UTC−02:00	Jádson 4', 76'; Lucas 21'; Luís Fabiano 28'; Toloi 63'	Report (es)		Stadium: Estádio Municipal Paulo Machado de Carvalho (Pacaembu); Attendance: 32,934; Referee: Enrique Cáceres (Paraguay)

==== Semi-finals ====
22 November First leg	Universidad Católica (Chile)	1–1	(Brazil) São Paulo	Santiago
20h15 UTC−02:00	Castillo 69'	Report (es)	Toloi 21'	Stadium: Estadio San Carlos de Apoquindo; Referee: Omar Ponce (Ecuador)

28 November Second leg	São Paulo (Brazil)	0–0 (a.g.) (1–1 agg.)	(Chile) Universidad Católica	São Paulo
21:50 UTC−02:00		Report (es)		Stadium: Estádio Cícero Pompeu de Toledo (Morumbi); Attendance: 55,286; Referee: Juan Soto (Venezuela)

==== Finals ====
5 December First leg	Tigre (Argentina)	0–0	(Brazil) São Paulo	Buenos Aires
21:50 UTC−02:00		Report (es)		Stadium: Estadio Alberto J. Armando (La Bombonera); Referee: Antonio Arias (Paraguay)

12 December Second leg	São Paulo (Brazil)	2–0 (2–0 agg.)	(Argentina) Tigre	São Paulo
21:50 UTC−02:00	Lucas 22'; Osvaldo 27'			Stadium: Estádio Cícero Pompeu de Toledo (Morumbi); Attendance: 67,042; Referee: Enrique Osses (Chile)

== Injuries during the season ==
Date	Player	Injury	Estimated Return Date	Source
January 2012 (Pre-season)	(Brazil) Rogério Ceni	Stretch on the right shoulder.	July 2012	globoesporte.com
January 2012 (Pre-season)	(Brazil) Fabrício	Tendinitis in his left ankle.	22 February 2012	São Paulo Futebol Clube
January 2012 (Pre-season)	(Brazil) Paulo Miranda	Pain in the left anterior thigh muscle.	2 February 2012	Placar
28 January 2012	(Brazil) Luís Fabiano	Lesion on the thigh.	7 March 2012	São Paulo Futebol Clube
5 February 2012	(Paraguay) Iván Piris	Edema in the posterior region of the left thigh.	22 February 2012	São Paulo Futebol Clube
21 February 2012	(Brazil) Wellington	Sprained left knee.	30 August 2012	São Paulo Futebol Clube
22 February 2012	(Brazil) Fabrício	Muscle contracture in the left thigh.	1 April 2012	globoesporte.com
7 April 2012	(Brazil) Fabrício	Stretch the right calf.	June 2012	São Paulo FC
17 June 2012	(Brazil) Fabrício	Cruciate ligament rupture.	2013	terra.com
18 July 2012	(Brazil) Osvaldo	Left thigh adductor.	18 August 2012	globoesporte.com
