= 2011 São Paulo FC season =

São Paulo
2011 season
- Chairman: Juvenal Juvêncio (re-elected on 20 April)
- Manager: Paulo César Carpegiani (until 6 July); Milton Cruz (caretaker manager); Adílson Batista (until 16 October); Milton Cruz (caretaker manager); Emerson Leão
- Série A: 6th
- Campeonato Paulista: Semi-finals
- Copa do Brasil: Quarter-finals
- Copa Sudamericana: Round of 16
- Top goalscorer: League: Lucas (9 goals); All: Dagoberto (22 goals)
- Highest home attendance: 63,871 (v Flamengo in the Campeonato Brasileiro)
- Lowest home attendance: 4,948 (v Santos in the Campeonato Brasileiro)
| Home colours | Away colours |

The 2011 season was São Paulo's 82nd season since the club's existence. After finishing the national league in ninth position in previous year, the team was not able to take part on Copa Libertadores for the first time in seven years. In Campeonato Paulista was eliminated by rival Santos in a single semifinal match, being defeated in Morumbi stadium by 0–2. Tricolor played also the Copa do Brasil but was eliminated in quarterfinals losing to Avaí in aggregate score, 1-0 (home); 1-3 (away). In Copa Sudamericana was defeated by Paraguayan club Libertad at the round of 16. The club finished the season with a sixth position in the league, not qualifying to Copa Libertadores. The highlight of year was the goalkeeper and capitain Rogério Ceni. The oldest and considered main player of club reach the accomplishment of 100 goals in career (since 1997) on 27 March against rival Corinthians by Campeonato Paulista with a 2–1 win and a done of 1000 matches on 7 September also victory by 2–1 against Atlético Mineiro in the Série A.

== Players ==
=== Current squad ===
As of 10 Septemter 2011 Note: Flags indicate national team as defined under FIFA eligibility rules; some limited exceptions apply. Players may hold more than one non-FIFA nationality.

| No. | Pos. | Nation | Player |
|---|---|---|---|
| 01 | GK | BRA | Rogério Ceni (captain) |
| 02 | MF | BRA | Jean |
| 04 | DF | BRA | Rhodolfo |
| 05 | MF | BRA | Wellington |
| 06 | DF | BRA | Juan |
| 07 | MF | BRA | Lucas |
| 08 | MF | BRA | Casemiro |
| 09 | FW | BRA | Luís Fabiano |
| 10 | MF | BRA | Rivaldo |
| 11 | MF | BRA | Marlos |
| 12 | FW | BRA | Fernandinho |
| 13 | DF | BRA | Xandão |
| 14 | MF | ARG | Marcelo Cañete |
| 15 | MF | BRA | Denílson |
| 16 | MF | BRA | Cícero |
| 17 | FW | BRA | Henrique |

| No. | Pos. | Nation | Player |
|---|---|---|---|
| 18 | MF | BRA | Rodrigo Caio |
| 19 | FW | BRA | Willian José |
| 20 | MF | BRA | Carlinhos Paraíba |
| 21 | DF | BRA | João Filipe |
| 23 | DF | PAR | Iván Piris |
| 25 | FW | BRA | Dagoberto |
| 27 | MF | BRA | Dener |
| 30 | DF | BRA | Luiz Eduardo |
| 32 | DF | BRA | Danilo |
| 33 | GK | BRA | Denis |
| 34 | DF | BRA | Bruno Uvini |
| 36 | MF | BRA | João Felipe |
| 37 | FW | BRA | Bruno |
| 38 | DF | BRA | Henrique Miranda |
| 40 | GK | BRA | Léo |
| 41 | GK | BRA | Leonardo |

=== Out on loan ===
Note: Flags indicate national team as defined under FIFA eligibility rules; some limited exceptions apply. Players may hold more than one non-FIFA nationality.

| No. | Pos. | Nation | Player |
|---|---|---|---|
| — | DF | BRA | Alex Cazumba (on loan to Botafogo-SP) |
| 32 | DF | BRA | Leonardo (on loan to Los Angeles Galaxy) |
| — | DF | BRA | Wagner Diniz (on loan to Atlético Paranaense) |
| 26 | DF | BRA | Thiago Carleto (on loan to América-MG) |
| 27 | DF | BRA | Diogo (on loan to Anderlecht) |
| 35 | MF | BRA | Zé Vitor (on loan to Slovan Bratislava) |

| No. | Pos. | Nation | Player |
|---|---|---|---|
| — | MF | BRA | Léo Gonçalves (on loan to Botafogo-SP) |
| 36 | MF | BRA | Juninho (on loan to Los Angeles Galaxy) |
| — | MF | BRA | Sérgio Mota (on loan to Icasa) |
| 8 | MF | BRA | Cleber Santana (on loan to Atlético-PR) |
| 37 | FW | BRA | Mazola (on loan to Urawa Red Diamonds) |
| — | FW | BRA | Roni (on loan to Gyeongnam) |

=== Transfers ===
==== In ====
Note: Flags indicate national team as defined under FIFA eligibility rules; some limited exceptions apply. Players may hold more than one non-FIFA nationality.

| No. | Pos. | Nation | Player |
|---|---|---|---|
| 16 | DF | BRA | Juan (from Flamengo) |
| 19 | FW | BRA | Willian José (from Grêmio Prudente) |
| 10 | MF | BRA | Rivaldo (on loan from Mogi Mirim) |
| 04 | DF | BRA | Rhodolfo (from Atlético Paranaense) |
| 21 | DF | BRA | Edson Ramos (on loan from Mallorca) |
| 09 | FW | BRA | Luís Fabiano (from Sevilla) |
| 16 | MF | BRA | Cícero (from Wolfsburg) |
| 15 | MF | BRA | Denílson (on loan from Arsenal) |
| 23 | DF | PAR | Iván Piris (from Cerro Porteño) |
| 14 | MF | ARG | Marcelo Cañete (from Boca Juniors) |
| 21 | DF | BRA | João Filipe (on loan from Botafogo) |

==== Out ====
Note: Flags indicate national team as defined under FIFA eligibility rules; some limited exceptions apply. Players may hold more than one non-FIFA nationality.

| No. | Pos. | Nation | Player |
|---|---|---|---|
| — | MF | BRA | Jorge Wagner (to Kashiwa Reysol) |
| — | MF | BRA | Richarlyson (to Atlético Mineiro) |
| — | FW | BRA | Ricardo Oliveira (return to Al-Jazira) |
| — | DF | BRA | Samuel (to Werder Bremen) |
| 14 | DF | BRA | Renato Silva (to Shandong Luneng Taishan) |
| 31 | MF | BRA | Marcelinho Paraíba (to Sport Recife) |
| 15 | FW | BRA | Fernandão (Retired) |
| 06 | DF | BRA | Júnior César (to Flamengo) |
| 39 | FW | BRA | Lucas Gaúcho (to Portuguesa) |
| 03 | DF | BRA | Alex Silva (return to Hamburger SV) |
| 21 | DF | BRA | Edson Ramos (return to Mallorca) |
| 22 | GK | BRA | Bosco (Retired) |
| 05 | DF | BRA | Miranda (to Atlético de Madrid) |
| 18 | MF | BRA | Rodrigo Souto (to Júbilo Iwata) |
| 24 | GK | BRA | Fabiano Ribeiro (to S.C. Olhanense) |
| 77 | MF | BRA | Ilsinho (Internacional) |

== Statistics ==
=== Appearances and goals ===
| No. | Pos | Nat | Player | Total | | Campeonato Paulista | | Copa do Brasil | | Campeonato Brasileiro | | Copa Sudamericana | |
| No. | Pos | Nat | Player | Apps | Goals | Apps | Goals | Apps | Goals | Apps | Goals | Apps | Goals |
|---|---|---|---|---|---|---|---|---|---|---|---|---|---|
| 01 | GK | (Brazil) BRA | Rogério Ceni | 68 | 8 | 21+0 | 6 | 7+0 | 0 | 36+0 | 2 | 4+0 | 0 |
| 02 | MF | (Brazil) BRA | Jean | 57 | 4 | 20+0 | 3 | 7+0 | 0 | 22+6 | 1 | 0+2 | 0 |
| 03 | DF | (Brazil) BRA | Alex Silva | 20 | 0 | 13+0 | 0 | 7+0 | 0 | 0+0 | 0 | 0+0 | 0 |
| 04 | DF | (Brazil) BRA | Rhodolfo | 52 | 4 | 11+0 | 2 | 6+0 | 1 | 31+0 | 1 | 4+0 | 0 |
| 05 | DF | (Brazil) BRA | Miranda | 23 | 1 | 17+0 | 1 | 6+0 | 0 | 0+0 | 0 | 0+0 | 0 |
| 05 | MF | (Brazil) BRA | Wellington^{1} | 41 | 1 | 2+1 | 0 | 0+0 | 0 | 34+0 | 1 | 4+0 | 0 |
| 06 | DF | (Brazil) BRA | Júnior César | 5 | 0 | 3+2 | 0 | 0+0 | 0 | 0+0 | 0 | 0+0 | 0 |
| 06 | DF | (Brazil) BRA | Juan^{2} | 60 | 4 | 18+0 | 0 | 7+0 | 0 | 31+0 | 4 | 4+0 | 0 |
| 07 | MF | (Brazil) BRA | Lucas | 43 | 13 | 8+0 | 3 | 4+0 | 0 | 28+0 | 9 | 3+0 | 1 |
| 08 | MF | (Brazil) BRA | Cléber Santana | 6 | 0 | 4+2 | 0 | 0+0 | 0 | 0+0 | 0 | 0+0 | 0 |
| 08 | MF | (Brazil) BRA | Casemiro^{3} | 40 | 6 | 10+2 | 1 | 5+0 | 1 | 17+4 | 4 | 1+1 | 0 |
| 09 | FW | (Brazil) BRA | Luís Fabiano | 12 | 7 | 0+0 | 0 | 0+0 | 0 | 10+0 | 6 | 2+0 | 1 |
| 10 | MF | (Brazil) BRA | Rivaldo | 46 | 7 | 5+4 | 1 | 1+3 | 0 | 11+19 | 5 | 1+2 | 1 |
| 11 | MF | (Brazil) BRA | Marlos | 54 | 7 | 8+10 | 3 | 3+4 | 0 | 8+18 | 4 | 1+2 | 0 |
| 12 | FW | (Brazil) BRA | Fernandinho | 39 | 6 | 12+1 | 4 | 4+0 | 1 | 10+9 | 1 | 2+1 | 0 |
| 13 | DF | (Brazil) BRA | Xandão | 42 | 0 | 12+3 | 0 | 2+2 | 0 | 22+1 | 0 | 0+0 | 0 |
| 14 | DF | (Brazil) BRA | Renato Silva | 1 | 0 | 0+1 | 0 | 0+0 | 0 | 0+0 | 0 | 0+0 | 0 |
| 14 | MF | (Argentina) ARG | Cañete | 2 | 0 | 0+0 | 0 | 0+0 | 0 | 0+2 | 0 | 0+0 | 0 |
| 15 | FW | (Brazil) BRA | Fernandão | 9 | 0 | 2+6 | 0 | 0+1 | 0 | 0+0 | 0 | 0+0 | 0 |
| 15 | MF | (Brazil) BRA | Denílson | 16 | 0 | 0+0 | 0 | 0+0 | 0 | 12+2 | 0 | 2+0 | 0 |
| 16 | MF | (Brazil) BRA | Cícero | 31 | 7 | 0+0 | 0 | 0+0 | 0 | 22+5 | 6 | 2+2 | 1 |
| 17 | FW | (Brazil) BRA | Henrique | 21 | 3 | 0+7 | 2 | 0+2 | 0 | 3+9 | 1 | 0+0 | 0 |
| 18 | MF | (Brazil) BRA | Rodrigo Souto | 24 | 0 | 13+1 | 0 | 2+0 | 0 | 8+0 | 0 | 0+0 | 0 |
| 18 | MF | (Brazil) BRA | Rodrigo Caio^{4} | 8 | 0 | 0+0 | 0 | 0+0 | 0 | 4+4 | 0 | 0+0 | 0 |
| 19 | FW | (Brazil) BRA | Willian José | 22 | 1 | 6+4 | 1 | 0+3 | 0 | 4+5 | 0 | 0+0 | 0 |
| 20 | MF | (Brazil) BRA | Carlinhos Paraíba | 57 | 2 | 16+1 | 0 | 6+1 | 0 | 26+4 | 2 | 3+0 | 0 |
| 21 | DF | (Brazil) BRA | Edson Ramos | 1 | 0 | 1+0 | 0 | 0+0 | 0 | 0+0 | 0 | 0+0 | 0 |
| 21 | DF | (Brazil) BRA | João Filipe | 22 | 0 | 0+0 | 0 | 0+0 | 0 | 18+0 | 0 | 4+0 | 0 |
| 22 | GK | (Brazil) BRA | Bosco | 0 | 0 | 0+0 | 0 | 0+0 | 0 | 0+0 | 0 | 0+0 | 0 |
| 23 | DF | (Paraguay) PAR | Piris | 21 | 1 | 0+0 | 0 | 0+0 | 0 | 16+1 | 1 | 4+0 | 0 |
| 25 | FW | (Brazil) BRA | Dagoberto | 57 | 22 | 16+1 | 9 | 7+0 | 4 | 30+0 | 8 | 3+0 | 1 |
| 26 | DF | (Brazil) BRA | Thiago Carleto | 0 | 0 | 0+0 | 0 | 0+0 | 0 | 0+0 | 0 | 0+0 | 0 |
| 27 | DF | (Brazil) BRA | Diogo | 0 | 0 | 0+0 | 0 | 0+0 | 0 | 0+0 | 0 | 0+0 | 0 |
| 27 | MF | (Brazil) BRA | Dener | 1 | 0 | 0+0 | 0 | 0+0 | 0 | 0+1 | 0 | 0+0 | 0 |
| 30 | DF | (Brazil) BRA | Luiz Eduardo | 17 | 0 | 2+3 | 0 | 0+1 | 0 | 9+2 | 0 | 0+0 | 0 |
| 31 | MF | (Brazil) BRA | Marcelinho Paraíba | 7 | 2 | 0+6 | 2 | 0+1 | 0 | 0+0 | 0 | 0+0 | 0 |
| 33 | GK | (Brazil) BRA | Denis | 4 | 0 | 0+0 | 0 | 0+0 | 0 | 2+1 | 0 | 0+1 | 0 |
| 34 | DF | (Brazil) BRA | Bruno Uvini | 6 | 0 | 0+0 | 0 | 0+0 | 0 | 1+5 | 0 | 0+0 | 0 |
| 35 | MF | (Brazil) BRA | Zé Vitor | 5 | 0 | 2+1 | 0 | 0+0 | 0 | 1+1 | 0 | 0+0 | 0 |
| 37 | FW | (Brazil) BRA | Mazola | 1 | 0 | 1+0 | 0 | 0+0 | 0 | 0+0 | 0 | 0+0 | 0 |
| 37 | FW | (Brazil) BRA | Bruno Cantanhede | 1 | 0 | 0+0 | 0 | 0+0 | 0 | 0+1 | 0 | 0+0 | 0 |
| 38 | DF | (Brazil) BRA | Henrique Miranda | 4 | 0 | 0+0 | 0 | 0+0 | 0 | 1+2 | 0 | 0+1 | 0 |
| 39 | FW | (Brazil) BRA | Lucas Gaúcho | 0 | 0 | 0+0 | 0 | 0+0 | 0 | 0+0 | 0 | 0+0 | 0 |
| 40 | GK | (Brazil) BRA | Léo | 0 | 0 | 0+0 | 0 | 0+0 | 0 | 0+0 | 0 | 0+0 | 0 |
| 41 | GK | (Brazil) BRA | Leonardo | 0 | 0 | 0+0 | 0 | 0+0 | 0 | 0+0 | 0 | 0+0 | 0 |
| 77 | MF | (Brazil) BRA | Ilsinho | 25 | 4 | 8+6 | 2 | 3+2 | 1 | 2+4 | 1 | 0+0 | 0 |

^{1}Wellington became nº 5 after the transfer of Miranda to Atlético de Madrid. Before he wore nº 28

^{2}Juan became nº 6 after the transfer of Júnior César to Flamengo. Before he wore nº 16

^{3}Casemiro became nº 8 after the loan of Cléber Santana to Atlético Paranaense. Before he wore nº 29

^{4}Rodrigo Caio became nº 18 after the transfer of Rodrigo Souto to Júbilo Iwata. Before he wore nº 36

=== Scorers ===
| Position | Nation | Playing position | Name | Campeonato Paulista | Copa do Brasil | Campeonato Brasileiro | Copa Sudamericana | Total |
|---|---|---|---|---|---|---|---|---|
| 1 | (Brazil) | FW | Dagoberto | 9 | 4 | 8 | 1 | 22 |
| 2 | (Brazil) | MF | Lucas | 3 | 0 | 9 | 1 | 13 |
| 3 | (Brazil) | GK | Rogério Ceni | 6 | 0 | 2 | 0 | 8 |
| 4 | (Brazil) | MF | Cícero | 0 | 0 | 6 | 1 | 7 |
| = | (Brazil) | FW | Luís Fabiano | 0 | 0 | 6 | 1 | 7 |
| = | (Brazil) | MF | Marlos | 3 | 0 | 4 | 0 | 7 |
| = | (Brazil) | MF | Rivaldo | 1 | 0 | 5 | 1 | 7 |
| 5 | (Brazil) | MF | Casemiro | 1 | 1 | 4 | 0 | 6 |
| = | (Brazil) | FW | Fernandinho | 4 | 1 | 1 | 0 | 6 |
| 7 | (Brazil) | MF | Jean | 3 | 0 | 1 | 0 | 4 |
| = | (Brazil) | DF | Rhodolfo | 2 | 1 | 1 | 0 | 4 |
| = | (Brazil) | DF | Ilsinho | 2 | 1 | 1 | 0 | 4 |
| = | (Brazil) | DF | Juan | 0 | 0 | 4 | 0 | 4 |
| 8 | (Brazil) | FW | Henrique | 2 | 0 | 1 | 0 | 3 |
| 9 | (Brazil) | MF | Carlinhos Paraíba | 0 | 0 | 2 | 0 | 2 |
| = | (Brazil) | MF | Marcelinho Paraíba | 2 | 0 | 0 | 0 | 2 |
| 10 | (Paraguay) | DF | Piris | 0 | 0 | 1 | 0 | 1 |
| = | (Brazil) | DF | Miranda | 1 | 0 | 0 | 0 | 1 |
| = | (Brazil) | MF | Wellington | 0 | 0 | 1 | 0 | 1 |
| = | (Brazil) | FW | Willian José | 1 | 0 | 0 | 0 | 1 |
| / | / | / | Own goals | 1 | 1 | 0 | 0 | 2 |
| | | | Total | 41 | 9 | 57 | 5 | 112 |

=== Managers performance ===
| Name | Nationality | From | To | P | W | D | L | GF | GA | Win% |
|---|---|---|---|---|---|---|---|---|---|---|
| Paulo César Carpegiani | Brazil | 16 January | 6 July | 36 | 24 | 2 | 10 | 59 | 34 | 68,5% |
| Milton Cruz (caretaker) | Brazil | 9 July | 17 July | 2 | 2 | 0 | 0 | 5 | 1 | 100% |
| Adílson Batista | Brazil | 23 July | 16 October | 22 | 7 | 9 | 6 | 35 | 30 | 45,4% |
| Milton Cruz (caretaker) | Brazil | 19 October | 23 October | 2 | 1 | 1 | 0 | 1 | 0 | 66,6% |
| Emerson Leão | Brazil | 26 October | 4 December | 8 | 3 | 1 | 4 | 12 | 10 | 41,6% |

== Competitions ==
=== Overall ===
| Games played | 70 (21 Campeonato Paulista, 7 Copa do Brasil, 38 Campeonato Brasileiro, 4 Copa Sudamericana) |
| Games won | 37 (14 Campeonato Paulista, 5 Copa do Brasil, 16 Campeonato Brasileiro, 2 Copa Sudamericana) |
| Games drawn | 13 (2 Campeonato Paulista, 0 Copa do Brasil, 11 Campeonato Brasileiro, 0 Copa Sudamericana) |
| Games lost | 20 (5 Campeonato Paulista, 2 Copa do Brasil, 11 Campeonato Brasileiro, 2 Copa Sudamericana) |
| Goals scored | 112 |
| Goals conceded | 75 |
| Goal difference | +37 |
| Best result | 4–0 (H) v Bragantino - Campeonato Paulista - 2011.2.19; 4–0 (H) v Ceará - Campeonato Brasileiro - 2011.9.17 |
| Worst result | 0–5 (A) v Corinthians - Campeonato Brasileiro - 2011.6.26 |
| Most appearances | Rogério Ceni (68) |
| Top scorer | Dagoberto (22) |

Source: São Paulo FC

=== Campeonato Paulista ===
| 16 January Round 1 | Mogi Mirim | 0–2 | São Paulo | Mogi Mirim |
| 17:00 UTC−02:00 | | Report (pt) | Rogério Ceni 4' (pen.); Marcelinho Paraíba 87' | Stadium: Estádio Romildo Vitor Ferreira; Attendance: 5,166; Referee: Rodrigo Guarizo Ferreira do Amaral |

| 19 January Round 2 | São Paulo | 3–0 | São Bernardo | São Paulo |
| 22:00 UTC−02:00 | Dagoberto 3'; Marlos 41'; Fernandinho 76' | Report (pt) | | Stadium: Estádio Cícero Pompeu de Toledo (Morumbi); Attendance: 6,398; Referee: Robinson José Andréa de Góes |

| 22 January Round 3 | São Paulo | 0–1 | Ponte Preta | São Paulo |
| 19:30 UTC−02:00 | | Report (pt) | Tiago Luís 76' | Stadium: Estádio Cícero Pompeu de Toledo (Morumbi); Attendance: 11,743; Referee: Flavio Rodrigues de Souza |

| 26 January Round 4 | Americana | 3–4 | São Paulo | Americana |
| 22:00 UTC−02:00 | Marcinho 20'; Rafael Chorão 44'; Fumagalli 90+2' (pen.) | Report (pt) | Gercimar 34' (o.g.); Dagoberto 48', 57'; Jean 73' | Stadium: Estádio Décio Vitta; Attendance: 8,705; Referee: Flávio Rodrigues Guerra |

| 30 January Round 5 | Santos | 2–0 | São Paulo | Barueri |
| 17:00 UTC−02:00 | Elano 10'; Maikon Leite 73' | Report (pt) | | Stadium: Arena Barueri; Attendance: 9,334; Referee: Sálvio Spínola Fagundes Filho |

| 3 February Round 6 | São Paulo | 3–2 | Linense | São Paulo |
| 19:30 UTC−02:00 | Rivaldo 56'; Marlos 63'; Rogério Ceni 85' | Report (pt) | Eric 51'; Alessandro 90' | Stadium: Estádio Cícero Pompeu de Toledo (Morumbi); Attendance: 14,483; Referee: Milton Etsuo Ballerini |

| 6 February Round 7 | Botafogo | 2–1 | São Paulo | Ribeirão Preto |
| 19:30 UTC−02:00 | Anselmo 41'; Paulinho 75' | Report (pt) | Marcelinho Paraíba 90+2' | Stadium: Estádio Santa Cruz; Attendance: 6,701; Referee: Robério Pereira Pires |

| 13 February Round 8 | Portuguesa | 2–3 | São Paulo | São Paulo |
| 17:00 UTC−02:00 | Héverton 57' (pen.), 86' | Report (pt) | Fernandinho 29'; Rogério Ceni 39'; Rhodolfo 75' | Stadium: Estádio Oswaldo Teixeira Duarte (Canindé); Attendance: 10,828; Referee: Flávio Rodrigues Guerra |

| 19 February Round 9 | São Paulo | 4–0 | Bragantino | São Paulo |
| 19:30 UTC−02:00 | Miranda 19'; Fernandinho 43'; Lucas 63'; Willian José 76' | Report (pt) | | Stadium: Estádio Cícero Pompeu de Toledo (Morumbi); Attendance: 13,830; Referee: Márcio Henrique de Gois |

| 27 February Round 10 | São Paulo | 1–1 | Palmeiras | São Paulo |
| 17:00 UTC−03:00 | Fernandinho 25' | Report (pt) | Adriano 83' | Stadium: Estádio Cícero Pompeu de Toledo (Morumbi); Attendance: 26,138; Referee: Marcelo Aparecido Ribeiro de Souza |

| 5 March Round 11 | São Caetano | 0–2 | São Paulo | São Caetano do Sul |
| 18:30 UTC−03:00 | | Report (pt) | Rhodolfo 73'; Jean 90' | Stadium: Estádio Municipal Anacleto Campanella; Attendance: 5,744; Referee: Leandro Bizzio Marinho |

| 10 March Round 12 | São Paulo | 2–0 | Ituano | São Paulo |
| 21:50 UTC−03:00 | Jean 40'; Dagoberto 49' | Report (pt) | | Stadium: Estádio Cícero Pompeu de Toledo (Morumbi); Attendance: 8,373; Referee: Welton Orlando Wohnrath |

| 13 March Round 13 | São Paulo | 3–0 | Santo André | São Paulo |
| 16:00 UTC−03:00 | Dagoberto 9'; Lucas 59'; Casemiro 67' | Report (pt) | | Stadium: Estádio Cícero Pompeu de Toledo (Morumbi); Attendance: 16,840; Referee: Marcelo Aparecido Ribeiro de Souza |

| 20 March Round 14 | Grêmio Prudente | 0–1 | São Paulo | Presidente Prudente |
| 18:30 UTC−03:00 | | Report (pt) | Henrique 74' | Stadium: Estádio Municipal Eduardo José Farah (Prudentão); Attendance: 10,929; Referee: Marcelo Rogério |

| 23 March Round 15 | Paulista | 3–2 | São Paulo | Jundiaí |
| 21:50 UTC−03:00 | Fabiano 1'; Welder 37'; Vanderlei 55' | Report (pt) | Rogério Ceni 52' (pen.); Dagoberto 70' | Stadium: Estádio Doutor Jayme Pinheiro de Ulhôa Cintra; Attendance: 6,437; Referee: Flávio Rodrigues Guerra |

| 27 March Round 16 | São Paulo | 2–1 | Corinthians | Barueri |
| 16:00 UTC−03:00 | Dagoberto 39'; Rogério Ceni 53' | Report (pt) | Dentinho 67' | Stadium: Arena Barueri; Attendance: 17,633; Referee: Guilherme Cereta de Lima |

| 3 April Round 17 | São Paulo | 1–0 | Mirassol | Barueri |
| 16:00 UTC−03:00 | Lucas 27' | Report (pt) | | Stadium: Arena Barueri; Attendance: 6,075; Referee: Paulo César de Oliveira |

| 10 April Round 18 | Noroeste | 1–4 | São Paulo | Bauru |
| 16:00 UTC−03:00 | Aleílson 78' | Report (pt) | Rogério Ceni 36' (pen.); Marlos 60'; Dagoberto 75'; Ilsinho 90' | Stadium: Estádio Dr. Alfredo de Castilho; Attendance: 7,658; Referee: Rodrigo Guarizo Ferreira do Amaral |

| 17 April Round 19 | São Paulo | 1–1 | Oeste | Mogi Mirim |
| 16:00 UTC−03:00 | Henrique 72' | Report (pt) | Reinaldo 39' | Stadium: Estádio Romildo Vitor Ferreira; Attendance: 5,550; Referee: Flavio Rodrigues de Souza |

| 24 April Quarterfinal | São Paulo | 2–0 | Portuguesa | Barueri |
| 16:00 UTC−03:00 | Ilsinho 40'; Dagoberto 81' | Report (pt) | | Stadium: Arena Barueri; Attendance: 11,134; Referee: Aurélio Sant'Anna Martins |

| 30 April Semifinal | São Paulo | 0–2 | Santos | São Paulo |
| 16:00 UTC−03:00 | | Report (pt) | Elano 60'; Ganso 72' | Stadium: Estádio Cícero Pompeu de Toledo (Morumbi); Attendance: 44,675; Referee: Raphael Claus |

==== Record ====
| Points | Matches | Wins | Draws | Losses | Goals For | Goals Away | Win% |
|---|---|---|---|---|---|---|---|
| 44 | 21 | 14 | 2 | 5 | 41 | 21 | 69% |

=== Copa do Brasil ===
| 16 February Round of 64 | Treze | 0–3 | São Paulo | Campina Grande |
| 22:00 UTC−02:00 | | Report (pt) | Dagoberto 10', 26'; Fernandinho 47' | Stadium: Estádio Governador Ernani Sátyro (Amigão); Attendance: 12,350; Referee: Arílson Anunciação |

| 30 March Round of 32 | Santa Cruz | 1–0 | São Paulo | Recife |
| 21:50 UTC−03:00 | Rodrigo Souto 34' (o.g.) | Report (pt) | | Stadium: Estádio José do Rego Maciel (Arruda); Attendance: 46,681; Referee: Marielson Alves Silva |

| 6 April Round of 32 | São Paulo | 2–0 | Santa Cruz | Barueri |
| 21:50 UTC−03:00 | Rhodolfo 9'; Ilsinho 72' | Report (pt) | | Stadium: Arena Barueri; Attendance: 21,430; Referee: Gutemberg de Paula Fonseca |

| 20 April Round of 16 | Goiás | 0–1 | São Paulo | Goiânia |
| 21:50 UTC−03:00 | | Report (pt) | Dagoberto 47' | Stadium: Estádio do Governo do Estado de Goiás (Serra Dourada); Attendance: 28,526; Referee: Marcos André Gomes da Pena |

| 27 April Round of 16 | São Paulo | 1–0 | Goiás | São Paulo |
| 21:50 UTC−03:00 | Dagoberto 19' | Report (pt) | | Stadium: Estádio Cícero Pompeu de Toledo (Morumbi); Attendance: 32,001; Referee: Marcelo de Lima Henrique |

| 4 May Quarterfinals | São Paulo | 1–0 | Avaí | São Paulo |
| 21:50 UTC−03:00 | Revson 48' (o.g.) | Report (pt) | | Stadium: Estádio Cícero Pompeu de Toledo (Morumbi); Attendance: 21,097; Referee: André luiz de Freitas Castro |

| 12 May Quarterfinals | Avaí | 3–1 | São Paulo | Florianópolis |
| 21:50 UTC−03:00 | William 16'; Bruno 30'; Marquinhos Gabriel 46' | Report (pt) | Casemiro 15' | Stadium: Estádio Aderbal Ramos da Silva (Ressacada); Attendance: 12,956; Referee: Márcio Chagas da Silva |

==== Record ====
| Points | Matches | Wins | Draws | Losses | Goals For | Goals Away | Win% |
|---|---|---|---|---|---|---|---|
| 15 | 7 | 5 | 0 | 2 | 9 | 4 | 71% |

=== Campeonato Brasileiro ===
| 22 May Round 1 | Fluminense | 0–2 | São Paulo | Rio de Janeiro |
| 18:30 UTC−03:00 | | Report (pt) | Dagoberto 33'; Lucas 48' | Stadium: Estádio Vasco da Gama (São Januário); Attendance: 5,700; Referee: Heber Roberto Lopes |

| 28 May Round 2 | São Paulo | 1–0 | Figueirense | São Paulo |
| 21:00 UTC−03:00 | Lucas 90+2' | Report (pt) | | Stadium: Estádio Cícero Pompeu de Toledo (Morumbi); Attendance: 10,149; Referee: Felipe Gomes da Silva |

| 8 June Round 3 | Atlético Mineiro | 0–1 | São Paulo | Sete Lagoas |
| 21:50 UTC−03:00 | | Report (pt) | Casemiro 21' | Stadium: Estádio Joaquim Henrique Nogueira (Arena do Jacaré); Attendance: 17,397; Referee: Sandro Meira Ricci |

| 11 June Round 4 | São Paulo | 3–1 | Grêmio | São Paulo |
| 18:30 UTC−03:00 | Casemiro 13'; Marlos 61'; Jean 84' | Report (pt) | Casemiro 52' (o.g.) | Stadium: Estádio Cícero Pompeu de Toledo (Morumbi); Attendance: 15,097; Referee: Paulo H. Godoy Bezerra |

| 19 June Round 5 | Ceará | 0–2 | São Paulo | Fortaleza |
| 16:00 UTC−03:00 | | Report (pt) | Marlos 35'; Lucas 66' | Stadium: Estádio Presidente Vargas; Attendance: 13,000; Referee: Edivaldo Elias da Silva |

| 26 June Round 6 | Corinthians | 5–0 | São Paulo | São Paulo |
| 16:00 UTC−03:00 | Danilo 46'; Liédson 53', 60', 79'; Jorge Henrique 82' | Report (pt) | | Stadium: Estádio Municipal Paulo Machado de Carvalho (Pacaembu); Attendance: 32,221; Referee: Rodrigo Braghetto |

| 29 June Round 7 | São Paulo | 0–2 | Botafogo | São Paulo |
| 21:50 UTC−03:00 | | Report (pt) | Elkeson 35'; Herrera 51' (pen.) | Stadium: Estádio Cícero Pompeu de Toledo (Morumbi); Attendance: 8,459; Referee: Elmo Alves Resende Cunha |

| 6 July Round 8 | Flamengo | 1–0 | São Paulo | Rio de Janeiro |
| 21:50 UTC−03:00 | Bottinelli 71' | Report (pt) | | Stadium: Estádio Olímpico João Havelange (Engenhão); Attendance: 18,418; Referee: Márcio Chagas da Silva |

| 9 July Round 9 | São Paulo | 2–1 | Cruzeiro | São Paulo |
| 18:30 UTC−03:00 | Dagoberto 20'; Marlos 46' | Report (pt) | Wallyson 70' | Stadium: Estádio Cícero Pompeu de Toledo (Morumbi); Attendance: 12,352; Referee: Marcelo de Lima Henrique |

| 17 July Round 10 | Internacional | 0–3 | São Paulo | Porto Alegre |
| 18:30 UTC−03:00 | | Report (pt) | Casemiro 19'; Fernandinho 39'; Carlinhos Paraíba 90+3' | Stadium: Estádio José Pinheiro Borda (Beira-Rio); Attendance: 13,630; Referee: Wagner Reway |

| 23 July Round 11 | São Paulo | 2–2 | Atlético Goianiense | São Paulo |
| 18:30 UTC−03:00 | Rhodolfo 8'; Rivaldo 53' | Report (pt) | Bida 44'; Anselmo 68' | Stadium: Estádio Cícero Pompeu de Toledo (Morumbi); Attendance: 24,397; Referee: Alício Pena Júnior |

| 27 July Round 12 | Coritiba | 3–4 | São Paulo | Curitiba |
| 21:50 UTC−03:00 | Rafinha 67'; Bill 74', 86' | Report (pt) | Carlinhos Paraíba 17'; Juan 23'; Dagoberto 30'; Lucas 54' | Stadium: Estádio Major Antônio Couto Pereira; Attendance: 26,038; Referee: Antônio F. de Carvalho Schneider |

| 31 July Round 13 | São Paulo | 0–2 | Vasco da Gama | São Paulo |
| 16:00 UTC−03:00 | | Report (pt) | Éder Luís 51'; Felipe 90+2' | Stadium: Estádio Cícero Pompeu de Toledo (Morumbi); Attendance: 23,369; Referee: Paulo H. Godoy Bezerra |

| 4 August Round 14 | São Paulo | 3–0 | Bahia | São Paulo |
| 21:00 UTC−03:00 | Rogério Ceni 28' (pen.); Dagoberto 44'; Lucas 50' | Report (pt) | | Stadium: Estádio Cícero Pompeu de Toledo (Morumbi); Attendance: 11,425; Referee: Marcio Chagas da Silva |

| 7 August Round 15 | Avaí | 1–2 | São Paulo | Florianópolis |
| 18:30 UTC−03:00 | William 59' | Report (pt) | Cícero 64', 69' | Stadium: Estádio Aderbal Ramos da Silva (Ressacada); Attendance: 11,107; Referee: Pablo dos Santos Alves |

| 13 August Round 16 | São Paulo | 2–2 | Atlético Paranaense | São Paulo |
| 18:30 UTC−03:00 | Ilsinho 24'; Rivaldo 90+1' | Report (pt) | Fransérgio 21'; Edigar 77' | Stadium: Estádio Cícero Pompeu de Toledo (Morumbi); Attendance: 24,948; Referee: Ricardo Marques Ribeiro |

| 18 August Round 17 | América-MG | 1–1 | São Paulo | Sete Lagoas |
| 21:30 UTC−03:00 | Kempes 87' | Report (pt) | Marlos 85' | Stadium: Estádio Joaquim Henrique Nogueira (Arena do Jacaré); Attendance: 2,636; Referee: Leandro Pedro Vuaden |

| 21 August Round 18 | São Paulo | 1–1 | Palmeiras | São Paulo |
| 16:00 UTC−03:00 | Dagoberto 41' | Report (pt) | Henrique 61' | Stadium: Estádio Cícero Pompeu de Toledo (Morumbi); Attendance: 17,037; Referee: Cleber Wellington Abade |

| 28 August Round 19 | Santos | 1–1 | São Paulo | Santos |
| 16:00 UTC−03:00 | Ganso 80' | Report (pt) | Lucas 45' | Stadium: Estádio Urbano Caldeira (Vila Belmiro); Attendance: 12,498; Referee: Wilson Luiz Seneme |

| 31 August Round 20 | São Paulo | 1–2 | Fluminense | São Paulo |
| 21:50 UTC−03:00 | Rogério Ceni 74' (pen.) | Report (pt) | Lanzini 17'; Rafael Sóbis 64' | Stadium: Estádio Cícero Pompeu de Toledo (Morumbi); Attendance: 8,000; Referee: Elmo Alves Resende Cunha |

| 4 September Round 21 | Figueirense | 1–2 | São Paulo | Florianópolis |
| 18:00 UTC−03:00 | João Paulo 48' | Report (pt) | Cícero 42'; Rivaldo 60' | Stadium: Estádio Orlando Scarpelli; Attendance: 12,263; Referee: Francisco Assis Almeida Filho |

| 7 September Round 22 | São Paulo | 2–1 | Atlético Mineiro | São Paulo |
| 16:00 UTC−03:00 | Lucas 1'; Dagoberto 51' | Report (pt) | Réver 10' | Stadium: Estádio Cícero Pompeu de Toledo (Morumbi); Attendance: 63,514; Referee: Pericles Bassols Pegado Cortez |

| 11 September Round 23 | Grêmio | 1–0 | São Paulo | Porto Alegre |
| 18:00 UTC−03:00 | Douglas 64' | Report (pt) | | Stadium: Estádio Olímpico Monumental; Attendance: 30,078; Referee: Héber Roberto Lopes |

| 17 September Round 24 | São Paulo | 4–0 | Ceará | São Paulo |
| 18:00 UTC−03:00 | Juan 42'; Piris 44'; Casemiro 65'; Rivaldo 72' | Report (pt) | | Stadium: Estádio Cícero Pompeu de Toledo (Morumbi); Attendance: 23,771; Referee: Pablo dos Santos Alves |

| 21 September Round 25 | São Paulo | 0–0 | Corinthians | São Paulo |
| 21:50 UTC−03:00 | | Report (pt) | | Stadium: Estádio Cícero Pompeu de Toledo (Morumbi); Attendance: 44,950; Referee: Wilson Luiz Seneme |

| 25 September Round 26 | Botafogo | 2–2 | São Paulo | Rio de Janeiro |
| 16:00 UTC−03:00 | Abreu 24', 39' (pen.) | Report (pt) | Henrique 65'; Rivaldo 90' | Stadium: Estádio Olímpico João Havelange (Engenhão); Attendance: 26,026; Referee: Sandro Meira Ricci |

| 2 October Round 27 | São Paulo | 1–2 | Flamengo | São Paulo |
| 16:00 UTC−03:00 | Dagoberto 78' | Report (pt) | Thiago Neves 64'; Renato Abreu 83' | Stadium: Estádio Cícero Pompeu de Toledo (Morumbi); Attendance: 63,871; Referee: Sandro Meira Ricci |

| 5 October Round 28 | Cruzeiro | 3–3 | São Paulo | Sete Lagoas |
| 21:50 UTC−03:00 | Keirrison 12'; Charles 71'; Anselmo Ramon 79' | Report (pt) | Cícero 60'; Dagoberto 65'; Juan 76' | Stadium: Estádio Joaquim Henrique Nogueira (Arena do Jacaré); Attendance: 9,904; Referee: Paulo Godoy Bezerra |

| 12 October Round 29 | São Paulo | 0–0 | Internacional | Barueri |
| 16:00 UTC−03:00 | | Report (pt) | | Stadium: Arena Barueri; Attendance: 24,470; Referee: Evandro Rogério Roman |

| 16 October Round 30 | Atlético Goianiense | 3–0 | São Paulo | Goiânia |
| 18:00 UTC−02:00 | Gilson 25'; Felipe 60'; Anselmo 70' (pen.) | Report (pt) | | Stadium: Estádio do Governo do Estado de Goiás (Serra Dourada); Attendance: 23,906; Referee: Sandro Meira Ricci |

| 23 October Round 31 | São Paulo | 0–0 | Coritiba | São Paulo |
| 16:00 UTC−02:00 | | Report (pt) | | Stadium: Estádio Cícero Pompeu de Toledo (Morumbi); Attendance: 15,148; Referee: Jailson Macedo Freitas |

| 30 October Round 32 | Vasco da Gama | 0–0 | São Paulo | Rio de Janeiro |
| 16:00 UTC−02:00 | | Report (pt) | | Stadium: Estádio Vasco da Gama (São Januário); Attendance: 17,575; Referee: Ricardo Marques Ribeiro |

| 6 November Round 33 | Bahia | 4–3 | São Paulo | Salvador |
| 19:00 UTC−02:00 | Souza 46'; Lulinha 68'; Fahel 74'; Luiz Eduardo 83' (o.g.) | Report (pt) | Wellington 21'; Lucas 48'; Cícero 59' | Stadium: Estádio Metropolitano Roberto Santos (Pituaçu); Attendance: 32,230; Referee: Evandro Rogério Roman |

| 13 November Round 34 | São Paulo | 2–0 | Avaí | São Paulo |
| 19:00 UTC−02:00 | Luís Fabiano 57', 64' | Report (pt) | | Stadium: Estádio Cícero Pompeu de Toledo (Morumbi); Attendance: 11,134; Referee: André Luiz Freitas Castro |

| 16 November Round 35 | Atlético Paranaense | 1–0 | São Paulo | Curitiba |
| 20:30 UTC−02:00 | Guerrón 11' | Report (pt) | | Stadium: Estádio Joaquim Américo Guimarães (Arena da Baixada); Attendance: 18,003; Referee: Pablo dos Santos Alves |

| 19 November Round 36 | São Paulo | 3–1 | América-MG | São Paulo |
| 19:00 UTC−02:00 | Luís Fabiano 25', 42'; Juan 51' | Report (pt) | Alessandro 79' | Stadium: Estádio Cícero Pompeu de Toledo (Morumbi); Attendance: 9,057; Referee: Marcelo de Lima Henrique |

| 27 November Round 37 | Palmeiras | 1–0 | São Paulo | São Paulo |
| 17:00 UTC−02:00 | Marcos Assunção 55' | Report (pt) | | Stadium: Estádio Municipal Paulo Machado de Carvalho (Pacaembu); Attendance: 19,145; Referee: Luiz Flávio de Oliveira |

| 4 December Round 38 | São Paulo | 4–1 | Santos | Mogi Mirim |
| 17:00 UTC−02:00 | Luís Fabiano 13', 80'; Cícero 33'; Lucas 38' | Report (pt) | Elano 61' | Stadium: Estádio Romildo Ferreira; Attendance: 4,948; Referee: Rodrigo Braghetto |

==== Record ====
| Points | Matches | Wins | Draws | Losses | Goals For | Goals Away | Win% |
|---|---|---|---|---|---|---|---|
| 59 | 38 | 16 | 11 | 11 | 57 | 46 | 52% |

=== Copa Sudamericana ===
| 10 August Second stage | Ceará (Brazil) | 2–1 | (Brazil) São Paulo | Fortaleza |
| 19:30 UTC−03:00 | Rudnei 45+1'; Marcelo Nicácio 90+3' | Report (pt) | Rivaldo 22' | Stadium: Estádio Presidente Vargas; Referee: Sandro Meira Ricci (BRA) |

| 24 August Second stage | São Paulo (Brazil) | 3–0 | (Brazil) Ceará | São Paulo |
| 21:50 UTC−03:00 | Cícero 55'; Lucas 61'; Dagoberto 64' | Report (pt) | | Stadium: Estádio Cícero Pompeu de Toledo (Morumbi); Attendance: 23,700; Referee: Marcelo de Lima Henrique (BRA) |

| 19 October Round of 16 | São Paulo (Brazil) | 1–0 | (Paraguay) Libertad | São Paulo |
| 21:50 UTC−02:00 | Luís Fabiano 76' | Report (pt) | | Stadium: Estádio Cícero Pompeu de Toledo (Morumbi); Attendance: 8,069; Referee: Jorge Larrionda |

| 26 October Round of 16 | Libertad (Paraguay) | 2–0 | (Brazil) São Paulo | Asunción |
| 21:50 UTC−02:00 | Aquino 9' (pen.); Núñez 67' | Report (pt) | | Stadium: Estadio Dr. Nicolás Léoz; Referee: Wilmar Roldán |

==== Record ====
| Points | Matches | Wins | Draws | Losses | Goals For | Goals Away | Win% |
|---|---|---|---|---|---|---|---|
| 6 | 4 | 2 | 0 | 2 | 5 | 4 | 50% |
