= Henrique Miranda (footballer, born 1993) =

Brazilian footballer (born 1993)

Personal information
- Full name: Henrique Miranda Ribeiro
- Date of birth: 10 May 1993 (age 33)
- Place of birth: São Bernardo do Campo, Brazil
- Height: 1.79 m (5 ft 10 1/2 in)
- Position: Left-back

Youth career
- 2005–2013: São Paulo

Senior career*
Years	Team	Apps	(Gls)
2011–2016	São Paulo	6	(0)
2013	→ Figueirense (loan)	8	(0)
2014–2015	→ Lechia Gdańsk (loan)	1	(0)
2015	→ Oeste (loan)	0	(0)

International career
2011	Brazil U20	3	(0)
- * Club domestic league appearances and goals

Henrique Miranda Ribeiro (born 10 May 1993), known as Henrique Miranda, is a Brazilian former professional footballer who played as a left-back.

Miranda made his first club appearance in the match against Figueirense for the 2011 Brazilian League.

== Career statistics ==
=== Club career ===
As of 4 March 2012

Club	Season	League		Cup		CONMEBOL		Other		Total	
Club	Season	Apps	Goals	Apps	Goals	Apps	Goals	Apps	Goals	Apps	Goals
São Paulo	2011	3	0	0	0	1	0	0	0	4	0
São Paulo	2012	0	0	0	0	0	0	0	0	0	0
Career Total		3	0	0	0	1	0	0	0	4	0

== Honours ==
São Paulo

- Copa São Paulo de Futebol Júnior: 2010

Brazil U20

- 8 Nations International Tournament: 2012
