= Zé Vitor (footballer, born 1991) =

Brazilian footballer

Personal information
- Full name: José Vitor Rodrigues Ribeiro da Silva
- Date of birth: 23 September 1991 (age 35)
- Place of birth: São Paulo, Brazil
- Height: 1.84 m (6 ft 0 in)
- Position: Defensive midfielder

Team information
- Current team: União Frederiquense

Youth career
- 2004–2010: São Paulo

Senior career*
Years	Team	Apps	(Gls)
2010–2015	São Paulo	11	(0)
2011–2012	→ Slovan Bratislava (loan)	1	(0)
2013	→ São Caetano (loan)	0	(0)
2014	→ Chapecoense (loan)	0	(0)
2016	Rio Claro	0	(0)
2017	São Carlos	0	(0)
2017	Atibaia		
2018	Itabaiana	0	(0)
2018	Karmiotissa	10	(2)
2019-	União Frederiquense	0	(0)
- * Club domestic league appearances and goals as of 7 January 2012

José Vitor Rodrigues Ribeiro da Silva (born 23 September 1991), known as Zé Vitor, is a Brazilian professional footballer who plays for União Frederiquense as a defensive midfielder.

== Career ==
In August 2011, he joined Slovak club Slovan Bratislava on loan from São Paulo.

== Career statistics ==
As of 13 August 2011

Club	Season	Domestic League		Domestic Cups		Continental Competitions		Other Tournaments		Total	
Club	Season	Apps	Goals	Apps	Goals	Apps	Goals	Apps	Goals	Apps	Goals
São Paulo	2010	9	0	0	0	0	0	0	0	9	0
São Paulo	2011	2	0	0	0	0	0	3	0	5	0
São Paulo	Total	11	0	0	0	0	0	3	0	14	0
Career Total		11	0	0	0	0	0	3	0	14	0

== Honours ==
São Paulo youth

- Copa São Paulo de Futebol Júnior: 2010
