= Eric (footballer, born 1989) =

Brazilian footballer

Personal information
- Full name: Eric Leandro da Silva
- Date of birth: March 8, 1989 (age 37)
- Place of birth: São José do Rio Preto, Brazil
- Height: 1.77 m (5 ft 10 in)
- Position: Striker

Team information
- Current team: Penapolense

Youth career
- 2005–2009: São Paulo

Senior career*
| Years | Team | Apps | (Gls) |
| 2007–2012 | São Paulo | 1 | (0) |
| 2009 | → Toledo (Loan) | | |
| 2009 | → Vila Nova (Loan) | | |
| 2010 | → Grêmio Catanduvense (Loan) | | |
| 2011 | → Sertãozinho (Loan) | | |
| 2011 | → Barretos (Loan) | | |
| 2012 | → Rio Preto (Loan) | | |
| 2012– | Penapolense | | |
- * Club domestic league appearances and goals

Eric Leandro da Silva, or simply Eric (born March 8, 1989, in São José do Rio Preto), is a Brazilian professional football striker. He currently plays for Penapolense.

He made his professional debut for São Paulo in a 1–2 away defeat to Atlético-PR in the Campeonato Brasileiro on December 2, 2007. Eric replaced Diego Tardelli in the 73rd minute of the match.

== Honours ==
São Paulo

- Brazilian League: 2007
