= Ney Franco =

Brazilian football manager

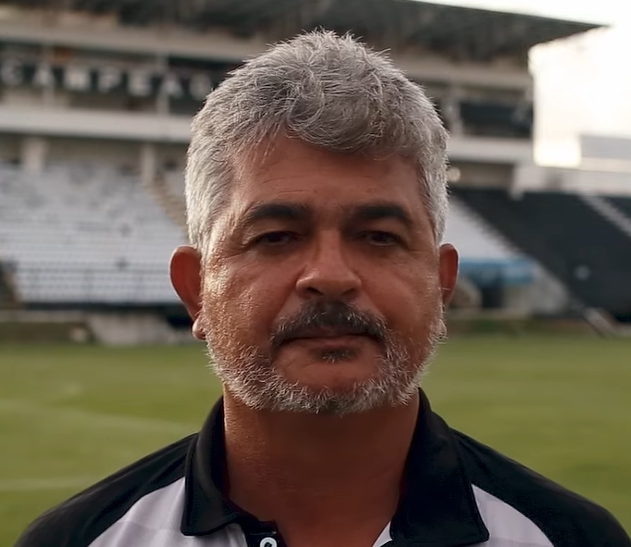
- Franco in 2024

Personal information
- Full name: Ney Franco da Silveira Júnior
- Date of birth: 22 July 1966 (age 60)
- Place of birth: Vargem Alegre, Brazil

Team information
- Current team: Al-Hussein (manager)

Managerial career
- Years: Team
- 1990–1993: Atlético Mineiro (youth)
- 1993–2004: Cruzeiro (youth)
- 2002: Cruzeiro (caretaker)
- 2004: Cruzeiro (caretaker)
- 2004: Cruzeiro (caretaker)
- 2005–2006: Ipatinga
- 2006–2007: Flamengo
- 2007–2008: Atlético Paranaense
- 2008–2009: Botafogo
- 2009–2010: Coritiba
- 2011–2012: Brazil U20
- 2012–2013: São Paulo
- 2013–2014: Vitória
- 2014: Flamengo
- 2014: Vitória
- 2015: Coritiba
- 2017: Sport
- 2018: Goiás
- 2019: Chapecoense
- 2019–2020: Goiás
- 2020: Cruzeiro
- 2021: CSA
- 2024: Joinville
- 2025: ABC
- 2025–: Al-Hussein
Medal record
Men's football
Representing Brazil (as manager)
FIFA U-20 World Cup
Winner	2011

Ney Franco da Silveira Júnior (born 22 July 1966), known as Ney Franco, is a Brazilian football coach who currently manages Jordanian team Al-Hussein Irbid.

== Career ==
Born in Vargem Alegre, Minas Gerais, Franco worked in Atlético Mineiro and Cruzeiro's youth categories before being named the latter's interim manager on three occasions, one in 2002 and two in 2004. Ahead of the 2005 campaign, he was appointed manager of Ipatinga as the club agreed to a partnership deal with Cruzeiro, and lifted the year's Campeonato Mineiro.

On 22 May 2006, after again reaching the finals of the state league, Franco was named manager of Flamengo, replacing sacked Waldemar Lemos. He won that year's Copa do Brasil in July, defeating Vasco da Gama in the finals; Franco previously took Ipatinga to the semifinals of the very same competition, the club's best-ever position. In the 2007 season, he won the Taça Guanabara and the Campeonato Carioca, but was sacked on 29 July, being later replaced by Joel Santana.

Appointed at the helm of Atlético Paranaense on 30 August 2007, Franco was sacked in May of the following year. On 11 July 2008, he was hired by Botafogo, but left the club on 10 August 2009; hours later, he was announced at Coritiba, suffering relegation at the end of the campaign.

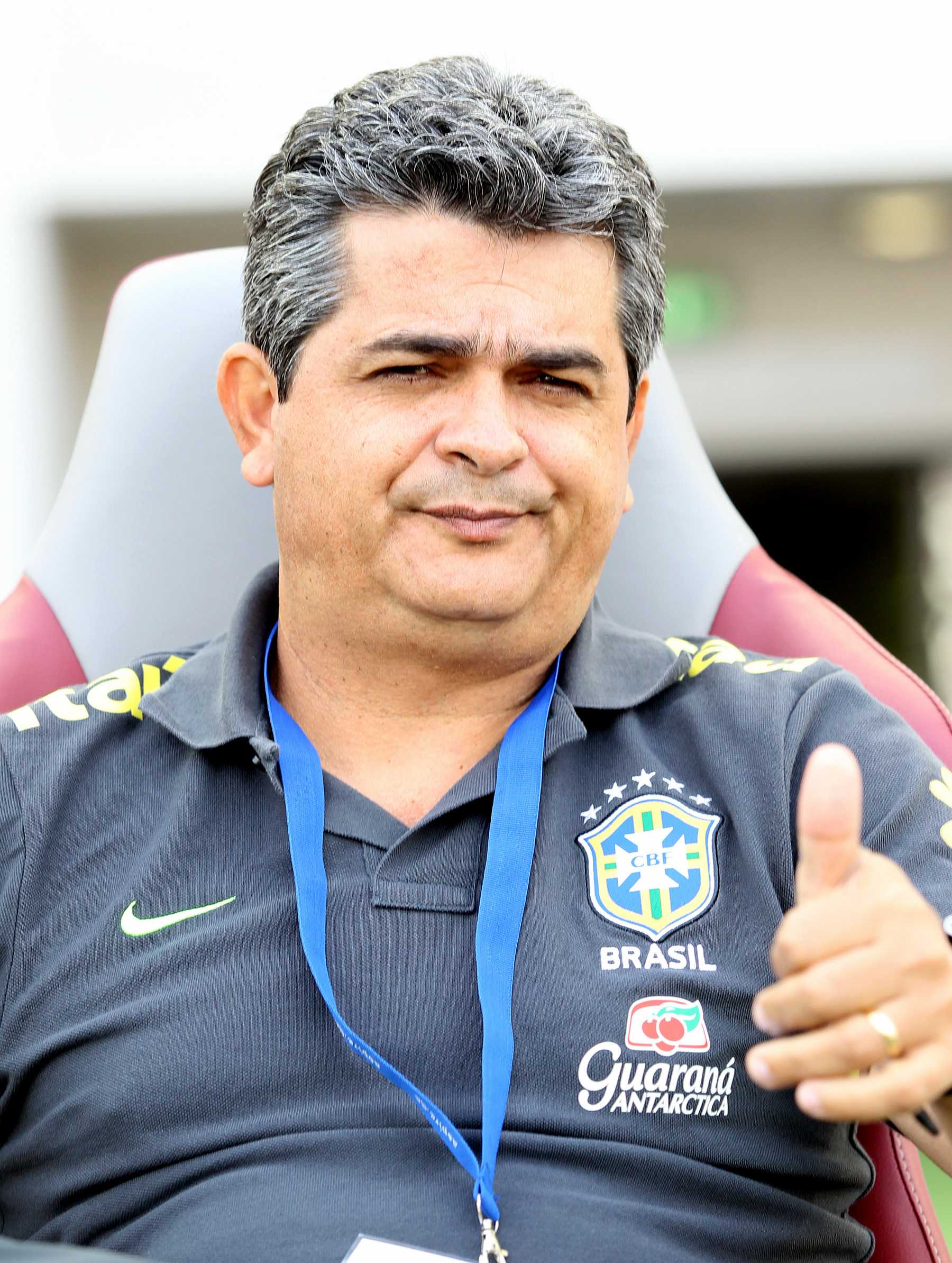
Franco as head coach of the Brazil under-20 team in 2011

On 23 September 2010, Franco was appointed as coach of Brazil under-20 team. He remained in charge of Coritiba until the end of the year, winning the Série B and returning to the top tier at first attempt. For the national team, he won the 2011 South American Youth Championship, qualifying to the 2011 FIFA U-20 World Cup (also won by Brazil) and the 2012 Summer Olympics.

On 5 July 2012, Franco replaced Emerson Leão at São Paulo, signing for the rest of season. Exactly one year after his signing, and in spite of winning the 2012 Copa Sudamericana, he was dismissed after being knocked out of the 2013 Copa Libertadores.

On 2 September 2013, Franco was appointed Vitória manager, and finished the season in the fifth position. The following 13 May he returned to Flamengo, but went back to Vitória on 21 August. In December, he resigned from the latter club.

On 8 June 2015, Franco returned to Coritiba, but was sacked on 3 November, with five matches left on the season. On 27 March 2017, after more than a year without coaching, he took over Sport, being relieved from his duties on 25 May after only 58 days in charge.

On 6 May 2018, Franco was announced at Goiás in the second division. In December, after achieving promotion to the first division, he resigned.

On 28 March 2019, Franco replaced Claudinei Oliveira at Chapecoense. He was sacked on 24 July, and returned to Goiás on 8 August, again replacing Claudinei Oliveira.

Franco was sacked by the Esmeraldino on 20 August 2020, following a 3–1 home loss against Fortaleza. On 8 September, he replaced Enderson Moreira at the helm of his first club Cruzeiro, now in the second division; his reign at the latter club only lasted seven matches, however.

On 9 July 2021, after nearly one year without a club, Franco was named manager of CSA, but was still sacked on 30 August after 12 matches.

== Coaching statistics ==
As of 21 February 2025

Coaching record by team and tenure
Team	Nat	From	To	Record								Ref
Team	Nat	From	To	G	W	D	L	GF	GA	GD	Win %	Ref
Cruzeiro (interim)	(Brazil)	14 August 2002	14 August 2002	1	0	1	0	1	1	+0	0.00	
Cruzeiro (interim)	(Brazil)	30 July 2004	6 August 2004	1	0	1	0	1	1	+0	0.00	
Cruzeiro (interim)	(Brazil)	15 November 2004	20 December 2004	6	1	0	5	8	12	−4	16.67	
Ipatinga	(Brazil)	14 January 2005	21 May 2006	44	20	17	7	78	47	+31	45.45	
Flamengo	(Brazil)	22 May 2006	29 July 2007	74	33	17	24	98	95	+3	44.59	
Athletico Paranaense	(Brazil)	21 August 2007	20 May 2008	48	29	9	10	72	40	+32	60.42	
Botafogo	(Brazil)	11 July 2008	10 August 2009	75	34	18	23	133	94	+39	45.33	
Coritiba	(Brazil)	11 August 2009	19 September 2010	65	37	14	14	102	73	+29	56.92	
Brazil U20	(Brazil)	20 September 2010	5 July 2012	16	12	3	1	42	12	+30	75.00	
São Paulo	(Brazil)	6 July 2012	5 July 2013	79	41	16	22	129	73	+56	51.90	
Vitória	(Brazil)	3 September 2013	12 May 2014	47	22	16	9	87	65	+22	46.81	
Flamengo	(Brazil)	13 May 2014	23 July 2014	7	0	3	4	3	13	−10	0.00	
Vitória	(Brazil)	22 August 2014	10 December 2014	29	10	4	15	31	41	−10	34.48	
Coritiba	(Brazil)	8 June 2015	3 November 2015	31	9	9	13	25	37	−12	29.03	
Sport Recife	(Brazil)	27 March 2017	24 May 2017	7	3	3	1	9	6	+3	42.86	
Goiás	(Brazil)	6 May 2018	26 November 2018	35	18	5	12	50	45	+5	51.43	
Chapecoense	(Brazil)	28 March 2019	24 July 2019	19	6	4	9	24	26	−2	31.58	
Goiás	(Brazil)	9 August 2019	20 August 2020	48	21	11	16	67	67	+0	43.75	
Cruzeiro	(Brazil)	10 September 2020	11 October 2020	7	2	1	4	6	7	−1	28.57	
CSA	(Brazil)	12 July 2021	1 September 2021	6	1	0	5	8	12	−4	16.67	
Joinville	(Brazil)	4 July 2024	20 October 2024	—	−	−	−	−	−	—	—	
ABC	(Brazil)	15 November 2024	23 February 2025	9	5	2	2	17	7	+10	55.56	
Total				646	303	153	190	982	761	+221	46.90	—

== Honours ==
=== Club ===
Ipatinga

- Campeonato Mineiro: 2005

Flamengo

- Copa do Brasil: 2006
- Taça Guanabara: 2007
- Campeonato Carioca: 2007

Botafogo

- Taça Guanabara: 2009

Coritiba

- Campeonato Paranaense: 2010
- Campeonato Brasileiro Série B: 2010

São Paulo

- Copa Sudamericana: 2012

=== International ===
Brazil U20

- South American Youth Championship: 2011
- Mediterranean International Cup: 2011
- FIFA U-20 World Cup: 2011
