= João Filipe =

Brazilian footballer (born 1988)

Personal information
- Full name: João Filipe Rabelo da Costa Silva
- Date of birth: 11 June 1988 (age 38)
- Place of birth: Rio de Janeiro, Brazil
- Height: 1.90 m (6 ft 3 in)
- Positions: Centre back; midfielder

Team information
- Current team: Tombense

Youth career
- 2005–2007: Sendas

Senior career*
Years	Team	Apps	(Gls)
2008	Sendas		
2009	Mesquita	13	(1)
2009–2010	Figueirense	50	(2)
2011	Botafogo	1	(0)
2011	→ São Paulo (loan)	17	(0)
2012–2014	São Paulo	12	(0)
2013	→ Náutico (loan)	22	(0)
2014	→ Avaí (loan)	16	(0)
2015–	Tombense	0	(0)
2015	→ Fluminense (loan)	0	(0)
2016	→ Avaí (loan)	17	(0)
2017	→ Atlético Goianiense (loan)	0	(0)
- * Club domestic league appearances and goals as of 26 November 2016

João Filipe Rabelo da Costa Silva (born 11 June 1988), known as João Filipe, is a Brazilian footballer who plays a central defender or a defensive midfielder for Tombense.

== Career ==
=== Career statistics ===
As of 21 September 2011

Club	Season	Domestic League		Domestic Cups		Continental Competitions		Other Tournaments		Total	
Club	Season	Apps	Goals	Apps	Goals	Apps	Goals	Apps	Goals	Apps	Goals
Botafogo	2011	1	0	3	0	0	0	12	1	16	1
São Paulo	2011	10	0	0	0	2	0	0	0	12	0
São Paulo	Total	11	0	3	0	2	0	12	1	28	1
Career Total		11	0	3	0	2	0	12	1	28	1

== Honours ==
São Paulo

- Copa Sudamericana: 2012
