= Léo Gonçalves =

Brazilian footballer

Personal information
- Full name: Leonardo Gonçalves Martins Netto
- Date of birth: 25 March 1989 (age 37)
- Place of birth: Santos, Brazil
- Height: 1.81 m (5 ft 11 1/2 in)
- Position: Attacking midfielder

Youth career
- 2004–2008: São Paulo

Senior career*
Years	Team	Apps	(Gls)
2008–2012	São Paulo	0	(0)
2009	→ Toledo (loan)		
2010	→ Rio Branco (loan)		
2010–2011	→ Mogi Mirim (loan)	2	(0)
2011–2012	→ Botafogo-SP (loan)	7	(1)
2013	Guaratinguetá	2	(0)
2014	ASA	0	(0)
2015	Inter de Limeira	20	(5)
2015	Juventus-SP	0	(0)
2016	Marília	11	(0)
2016	Murici	4	(2)
2017	Toledo	9	(0)
2017	Barra-SC		
2018	Portuguesa Santista	12	(4)
2018	Portuguesa	0	(0)
2019	Noroeste	10	(3)
2019	União Rondonópolis	5	(0)
2020	Vitória-ES	12	(4)
2021	ASA	1	(0)
2021	Guarani-VA	8	(0)
2022	Bandeirante	8	(0)
2022	Aymorés	2	(1)
2023	Barretos	0	(0)
- * Club domestic league appearances and goals

Leonardo "Léo" Gonçalves Martins Netto (born 25 March 1989 in Santos, São Paulo ) is a Brazilian retired footballer who played as an attacking midfielder.
