= Vargem Alegre =

- Municipality
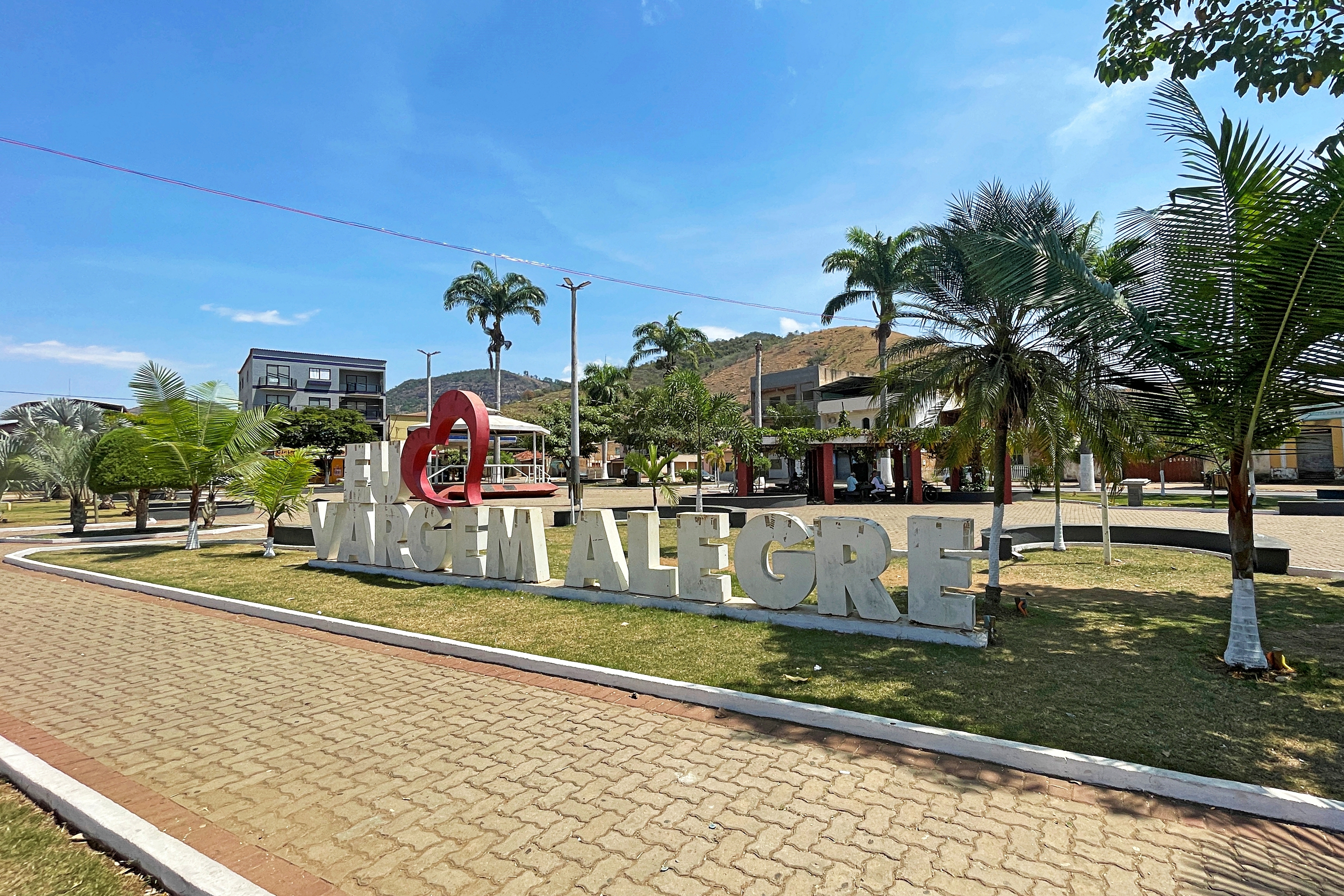
- "Eu Amo Vargem Alegre" ("I love Vargem Alegre") in the Israel Nunes Square

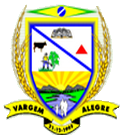
- Coat of arms

- Location in Brazil
- Coordinates: 19°36′28″S 42°17′52″W
- Country: Brazil
- Region: Southeast
- State: Minas Gerais
- Mesoregion: Vale do Rio Doce

Government
  - Mayor: Diogénes Timo Silva (PSDB)

Population (2020)
  - Total: 6,470
- Time zone: UTC−3 (BRT)

Vargem Alegre is a municipality in the state of Minas Gerais in the Southeast region of Brazil.

== See also ==
- List of municipalities in Minas Gerais
