= Thiago Biriça =

Brazilian footballer

Personal information
- Full name: Thiago Fernandes dos Santos
- Date of birth: January 12, 1988 (age 38)
- Place of birth: Marilia, Brazil
- Height: 1.79 m (5 ft 10 in)
- Position: Forward

Youth career
- 2005–2006: São Paulo

Senior career*
Years	Team	Apps	(Gls)
2007–2012	São Paulo	1	(0)
2008	→ Penafiel (loan)		
2009	→ Toledo (loan)		
2010	→ São Carlos (loan)		
2011	→ Paulínia (loan)		
2011	→ Cotia (loan)		
2012	→ São Carlos (loan)		
- * Club domestic league appearances and goals

Thiago Fernandes dos Santos or simply Thiago Biriça (born January 12, 1988, in Marilia), is a Brazilian footballer who plays as a forward for São Carlos.

He made his professional debut for São Paulo against Fluminense in a 1–1 draw at the Maracanã in the Campeonato Brasileiro on October 13, 2007. Replaced Diego Tardelli in the 78th and played the remaining 12 minutes.

== Honours ==
- Brazilian League: 2009
