= Juan (footballer, born 1982) =

Brazilian-Spanish footballer

Personal information
- Full name: Juan Maldonado Jaimez Júnior
- Date of birth: 6 February 1982 (age 44)
- Place of birth: São Paulo, Brazil
- Height: 1.68 m (5 ft 6 in)
- Position: Left-back

Youth career
- 1998–2000: São Paulo

Senior career*
Years	Team	Apps	(Gls)
2000–2001	São Paulo	0	(0)
2001–2004	Arsenal	0	(0)
2003	→ Millwall (loan)	3	(0)
2004–2005	Fluminense	42	(1)
2006–2010	Flamengo	148	(14)
2011–2013	São Paulo	31	(4)
2012	→ Santos (loan)	18	(0)
2013–2015	Vitória	44	(3)
2015–2016	Coritiba	42	(7)
2017	Goiás	1	(0)
2017	Avaí	22	(1)
2018	CSA	18	(1)
2019	Tombense	0	(0)
2019	Boavista	8	(0)

International career
2008	Brazil	2	(0)
- * Club domestic league appearances and goals

Juan Maldonado Jaimez Júnior (born 6 February 1982), simply known as Juan, is a Brazilian footballer who played as a left-back. He also holds an EU passport as a Spanish citizen.

== Club career ==
=== Arsenal ===
Juan was born in São Paulo. He started his career with São Paulo before being signed by English side Arsenal in 2001. He only made two first-team appearances for Arsenal, his debut coming against Grimsby Town in the League Cup on 27 November 2001. His other appearance came when he started in the 5th Round of the FA Cup against Gillingham on 16 February 2002. Juan was due to play in Arsenal's Third Round League Cup tie against Sunderland but picked up a knee injury ahead of the game. He also scored in a pre-season friendly for Arsenal against Stevenage in 2002. On 8 November 2002, additional diagnosis confirmed an ACL knee injury. This injury essentially ended Juan's Arsenal career.

=== Millwall ===
He had a brief period on loan for two months at Millwall in 2003. There, he played three league matches and one League Cup match.

=== Flamengo ===
Juan moved to Flamengo in the beginning of 2006. Late in that year he scored one goal in the final of Brazilian Cup against Vasco da Gama and was named "man of the match".

After being voted one of the best players in the Brazilian Série A 2007, Juan received the second place prize Bola de Prata (Silver Ball) award for best left back awarded by Placar, a prestigious Brazilian football magazine. Juan played well once again in the 2008 season, this time winning the Bola de Prata (Silver Ball) award as the best player in his position.

On 22 August 2008, Juan received his first call up to Brazil national team to play against Chile and Bolivia in the qualifying round of the World Cup 2010. After this spell with the national team Juan was occasionally referred to as Juan Maldonado to avoid confusion with Juan, another former Flamengo player who had also been called up for Brazil around this time.

On 22 May 2009, Juan received a 30-day ban for threatening Botafogo's Maicosuel in the 2009 Rio de Janeiro State League finals.

=== São Paulo ===
In December 2010, as his Flamengo contract was expiring, São Paulo announced interest in signing the player. Juan declared that a return to São Paulo, the club where he played as a youth player before joining Arsenal, would be "like moving home." Juan joined São Paulo at the start of 2011 season. After the finish of his loan for Santos, Juan, that was out of Ney Franco's plans, didn't back to club.

=== Santos ===
In February 2012 Juan joined Santos on a season long loan after São Paulo signed left back Cortês from Botafogo. The move has worked out well with Juan playing regularly and helping his side win the 2012 São Paulo State Championship.

=== Return to São Paulo ===
In May 2013, after the reorganisation made by president Juvenal Juvêncio and coach Ney Franco, which got rid of seven players, Juan was reintegrated to Tricolor. In the Juvêncio's words: "O rapaz [Juan] chegou impecável e disposto a jogar" ("The boy [Juan] came with a flawless form and wishing to play"). The next month, Juan made his début against Atlético Mineiro in the Brazilian League. Juan came on from the bench as a substitute for Thiago Carleto, who came off injured. According to Juan: "Estou muito feliz de poder defender o São Paulo novamente."("I am very happy to defend São Paulo again").

On 5 June 2013, Juan made his full début for São Paulo. The game finished 1–0 to Goiás, and the player was criticized by fans. According to Juan he did not understand the claims: "Quando o resultado não vem, sobra para alguém. Mais uma vez, sobrou para mim. Queria entender qual o problema da torcida comigo. Eu me esforço, luto. Sei que não estou 100%, que eu posso render mais, mas time grande é assim, tem pressão" ("When we could not win, somebody always is faulted. One more time, I was the faulted. I would want to understand which the fans' problems with me. I try, I fight. I know I am not 100% conditioned, that I can play better, but in great club the things are this way, under pressure").

=== Vitória ===
On 30 August 2013, Juan was presented in Vitória. He chose the side from Bahia because of Caio Júnior, with whom he worked at Flamengo, a period during which Juan made it into the Brazilian team. Ironically, with Júnior dismissed, Juan would work again with Ney Franco, the coach that, in the start of 2013, did not have Juan in his plans when both of them were at São Paulo. Juan scored his first goal on 4 September, in a 2–1 loss against Flamengo.

On 5 October 2013, in the 3–2 loss against São Paulo, Juan scored a penalty against his former club and was heavily scolded by Tricolor fans and also by Rogério Ceni, São Paulo's captain, who said Juan kicked the ball with both feet, which is prohibited in football.

=== Retirement ===
On 16 August 2019, 37-year old Juan announced his retirement from football.

== International career ==
Juan debuted in the Brazil national team on 7 September 2008 as a second-half substitute replacing Ronaldinho in the 2010 World Cup Qualifiers 3–0 win over Chile. Three days later, he played his first match as a starter against Bolivia in Estádio Olímpico João Havelange, also for the 2010 World Cup Qualifiers.

== Career statistics ==
=== Club ===
As of 8 November 2023

Appearances and goals by club, season and competition
Club	Season	League		State League		Cup		Continental		Other		Total	
Club	Season	Apps	Goals	Apps	Goals	Apps	Goals	Apps	Goals	Apps	Goals	Apps	Goals
Arsenal	2001–02	–		–		2	0	–		–		2	0
Arsenal	2002–03	–		–		–		–		–		0	0
Arsenal	Total	0	0	0	0	2	0	0	0	0	0	2	0
Millwall	2003–04	3	0	–		–		–		–		3	0
Fluminense	2004	5	0	11	0	–		–		–		16	0
Fluminense	2005	37	1	14	1	2	0	6	1	–		59	3
Fluminense	Total	42	1	25	1	2	0	6	1	0	0	75	3
Flamengo	2006	29	2	9	2	9	2	–		–		47	6
Flamengo	2007	34	6	12	1	–		8	0	–		54	7
Flamengo	2008	33	4	15	3	–		8	1	–		56	8
Flamengo	2009	19	1	14	6	5	1	–		–		38	8
Flamengo	2010	33	1	12	0	–		10	1	–		55	2
Flamengo	Total	148	14	62	12	14	3	26	2	0	0	250	31
São Paulo	2011	31	4	18	0	7	0	4	0	–		60	4
Santos	2012	18	0	12	2	–		13	0	–		43	2
São Paulo	2013	5	0	–		–		2	0	–		7	0
Vitória	2013	21	3	–		–		–		–		21	3
Vitória	2014	23	0	9	5	2	1	–		6	3	40	9
Vitória	Total	44	3	9	5	2	1	0	0	6	3	61	12
Coritiba	2015	15	3	–		1	0	–		–		16	3
Coritiba	2016	27	4	13	6	–		4	0	2	0	46	10
Coritiba	Total	42	7	13	6	1	0	4	0	2	0	62	13
Goiás	2017	1	0	11	2	3	0	–		–		15	2
Avaí	2017	22	1	–		–		–		–		22	1
CSA	2018	18	1	–		–		–		–		18	1
Tombense	2019	–		10	2	2	2	–		–		12	4
Boavista	2019	8	0	–		–		–		1	0	9	0
Career total		382	31	160	30	33	6	55	3	9	3	639	73

=== International ===
Appearances and goals by national team and year
National team	Year	Apps	Goals
Brazil	2008	2	0

== Honours ==
=== Club ===
Arsenal

- FA Cup: 2002

Fluminense

- Taça Guanabara: 2005
- Campeonato Carioca: 2005

Flamengo

- Copa do Brasil: 2006
- Taça Guanabara: 2007, 2008
- Taça Rio: 2009
- Campeonato Carioca: 2007, 2008, 2009
- Campeonato Brasileiro Série A: 2009

Santos

- Campeonato Paulista: 2012
- Recopa Sudamericana: 2012

=== Individual ===
- Campeonato Brasileiro Série A Team of the Year: 2008
- Bola de Prata: 2008
