= Luiz Eduardo (footballer, born 1993) =

Brazilian footballer

Personal information
- Full name: Luiz Eduardo Felix da Costa
- Date of birth: 28 April 1993 (age 33)
- Place of birth: Guaíra, Brazil
- Height: 1.86 m (6 ft 1 in)
- Position: Centre back

Team information
- Current team: Ska Brasil

Youth career
- 2010–2012: São Paulo

Senior career*
Years	Team	Apps	(Gls)
2011–2016	São Paulo	17	(0)
2013	→ Náutico (loan)	6	(0)
2014	→ Comercial (loan)	7	(0)
2014	→ Boa Esporte (loan)	4	(0)
2015	→ Rio Claro (loan)	4	(1)
2015	→ Juventude (loan)	0	(0)
2016–2018	Gil Vicente	63	(0)
2018–2019	Portuguesa	17	(0)
2019	→ Luverdense (loan)	6	(1)
2020	Luverdense	0	(0)
2020	Votuporanguense	3	(0)
2021	Água Santa	9	(0)
2021–2023	Comercial	26	(1)
2022	→ Uberaba SC (loan)		
2023	Paraná		
2023–2024	Tupy de Jussara		
2024–	Ska Brasil		
- * Club domestic league appearances and goals as of 03:39, 7 April 2024 (UTC)

Luiz Eduardo Felix da Costa, known as Luiz Eduardo (born 28 April 1993) is a Brazilian footballer who plays for Ska Brasil as a central defender.

== Career ==
=== São Paulo ===
Luiz Eduardo made his professional debut in the Campeonato Paulista for São Paulo on 30 January 2011 in a game against Santos.

=== Náutico ===
Luiz Eduardo made his league debut against Flamengo on 6 June 2013.

=== First spell at Comercial ===
Luiz Eduardo made his league debut against Paulista on 20 February 2014.

=== Boa Esporte ===
Luiz Eduardo made his league debut against Ponte Preta on 31 May 2014.

=== Rio Claro ===
Luiz Eduardo made his league debut against Marília on 4 February 2015. He scored his first goal for the club against Linense on 7 February 2015, scoring in the 82nd minute.

=== Gil Vicente ===
Luiz Eduardo made his league debut against Varzim on 6 August 2016.

=== Portuguesa ===
Luiz Eduardo made his league debut against Nacional AC SP on 20 January 2019.

=== Loan to Luverdense ===
Luiz Eduardo made his league debut against São José RS on 4 May 2019. He scored his first goal for the club against Atlético Acreano on 23 June 2019, scoring in the 33rd minute.

=== Votuporanguense ===
Luiz Eduardo made his league debut against XV de Piracicaba on 19 August 2020.

=== Água Santa ===
Luiz Eduardo made his league debut against Velo Clube on 27 February 2021.

=== Second spell at Comercial ===
Luiz Eduardo made his league debut against Sertãozinho on 29 January 2022. He scored his first goal for the club against São José EC on 9 April 2022, scoring in the 69th minute.
