= 2006 Sport Club do Recife season =

Sport Recife
2006 season
- Chairman: Luciano Bivar
- Manager: Dorival Júnior; Givanildo Oliveira
- Stadium: Ilha do Retiro
- Série B: Runners-up
- Pernambucano: Champions (35th title)
- Top goalscorer: League: Fumagalli (18); All: Fumagalli (22)
Home colours	Away colours	Third colours

The 2006 season was Sport Recife's 102nd season in the club's history. Sport competed in the Campeonato Pernambucano and Série B.

== Squad ==
Note: Flags indicate national team as defined under FIFA eligibility rules; some limited exceptions apply. Players may hold more than one non-FIFA nationality.

No.	Pos.	Nation	Player
—	GK	BRA	Magrão
—	GK	BRA	Gustavo Nascimento
—	GK	BRA	Batista
4	DF	BRA	Durval
—	DF	BRA	Kleber Romero
—	DF	BRA	Dão
2	DF	BRA	Marcos Tamandaré
—	DF	BRA	Ney Santos
—	DF	BRA	Serginho
—	DF	BRA	Bruno Recife
5	MF	TOG	Hamilton

No.	Pos.	Nation	Player
—	MF	BRA	Ticão
—	MF	BRA	Éverton
—	MF	BRA	Diego Silva Patriota
11	MF	BRA	Wellington
—	MF	BRA	P.Oliveira
—	MF	BRA	Fumagalli
10	MF	BRA	Geraldo
17	FW	BRA	Marco Antônio
—	FW	BRA	Bibi
—	FW	BRA	Jadílson
—	FW	BRA	Da Silva
—	FW	BRA	Anderson Aquino

== Statistics ==
=== Overall ===
Games played	58 (20 Pernambucano, 38 Série B)
Games won	30 (12 Pernambucano, 18 Série B)
Games drawn	15 (5 Pernambucano, 10 Série B)
Games lost	13 (3 Pernambucano, 10 Série B)
Goals scored	96
Goals conceded	55
Goal difference	+41
Best results (goal difference)	8–1 (H) v Guarani - Série B - 2006.08.19
Worst result (goal difference)	1–4 (H) v Central - Pernambucano - 2006.01.25
Top scorer	Fumagalli (22)

Source: Sport Recife official website

=== Goalscorers ===
Place	Pos.	Nat.	Name	Campeonato Pernambucano	Série B	Total
1	MF	(Brazil)	Fumagalli	4	18	22
2	MF	(Brazil)	Wellington	6	5	11
3	FW	(Brazil)	Adriano Magrão	0	10	10
4	FW	(Brazil)	Anderson Aquino	4	2	6
4	DF	(Brazil)	Bruno Recife	3	3	6
5	MF	(Brazil)	Éverton	2	3	5
5	FW	(Brazil)	Jadílson	2	3	5
5	DF	(Brazil)	Kleber Romero	2	3	5
6	MF	(Brazil)	Marco Antônio	0	4	4
6	DF	(Brazil)	Marcos Tamandaré	3	1	4
6	MF	(Brazil)	Rodriguinho	3	1	4
7	DF	(Brazil)	Durval	2	1	3
7	MF	(Brazil)	George	3	0	3
8	DF	(Brazil)	Possato	2	0	2
9	FW	(Brazil)	Clayton	1	0	1
9	MF	(Brazil)	Geraldo	1	0	1
9	DF	(Brazil)	Jorge Guerra	0	1	1
9	FW	(Brazil)	Maia	0	1	1
9	MF	(Brazil)	Mazinho	1	0	1
9	MF	(Brazil)	Ticão	0	1	1
			Total	39	57	96

== Competitions ==
=== Campeonato Pernambucano ===
==== First stage ====
8 January 2006 1	Estudantes	0–2	Sport	Paulista
16:00 (UTC-3)		Report	Jadílson 57', 64'	Stadium: Estádio Ademir Cunha; Attendance: 10,403; Referee: Patrício Souza

11 January 2006 2	Sport	3–0	Serrano	Recife
20:30 (UTC-3)	Possato 29', 69'; George 74'	Report		Stadium: Estádio Adelmar da Costa Carvalho (Ilha do Retiro); Attendance: 25,051; Referee: Wilson Souza

15 January 2006 3	Sport	1–0	Salgueiro	Recife
16:00 (UTC-3)	George 69'			Stadium: Estádio Adelmar da Costa Carvalho (Ilha do Retiro)

18 January 2006 4	Porto	0–1	Sport	Caruaru
20:40 (UTC-3)			Wellington	Stadium: Estádio Luiz Lacerda (Lacerdão)

22 January 2006 5	Náutico	1–1	Sport	Recife
16:00 (UTC-3)	Flávio 88' (pen.)	Report	George 25'	Stadium: Estádio Eládio de Barros Carvalho (Aflitos); Attendance: 6,727; Referee: Cláudio Mercante

25 January 2006 6	Sport	1–4	Central	Recife
21:45 (UTC-3)	Wellington 90+1'	Report	João Neto 21'; Clebson; Rogério (pen.); Fernando 73'	Stadium: Estádio Adelmar da Costa Carvalho (Ilha do Retiro)

29 January 2006 7	Sport	1–1	Santa Cruz	Recife
16:00 (UTC-3)	Wellington 31'	Report	Carlinhos Bala 3'	Stadium: Estádio Adelmar da Costa Carvalho (Ilha do Retiro); Attendance: 23,084; Referee: Ricardo Tavares

1 February 2006 8	Ypiranga	2–1	Sport	Santa Cruz do Capibaribe
21:30 (UTC-3)	Wilson Surubim 56'; Jorge Guerra 80'	Report	Durval 11'	Stadium: Estádio Otávio Limeira Alves; Attendance: 4,963; Referee: Carlos Costa

5 February 2006 9	Vitória das Tabocas	1–2	Sport	Vitória de Santo Antão
15:00 (UTC-3)	Goal		Kléber 50'; Éverton	Stadium: Estádio Municipal Severino Cândido Carneiro (Carneirão)

==== Second stage ====
11 February 2006 1	Sport	2–2	Estudantes	Recife
16:00 (UTC-3)	Mazinho 80'; Durval 89'		Djalma; Fernando Pilar	Stadium: Estádio Adelmar da Costa Carvalho (Ilha do Retiro)

19 February 2006 2	Serrano	1–3	Sport	Serra Talhada
16:00 (UTC-3)	Keba		Éverton; Fumagalli; Anderson Aquino 60'	Stadium: Estádio Nildo Pereira (Pereirão)

1 March 2006 3	Salgueiro	0–1	Sport	Salgueiro
20:30 (UTC-3)		Report	Fumagalli 3'	Stadium: Estádio Cornélio de Barros; Attendance: 8,430; Referee: Antônio Hora Filho

6 March 2006 4	Sport	6–0	Porto	Recife
20:30 (UTC-3)	Bruno Recife; Rodriguinho; Marcos Tamandaré, Anderson Aquino; Clayton			Stadium: Estádio Adelmar da Costa Carvalho (Ilha do Retiro)

12 March 2006 5	Sport	1–1	Náutico	Recife
17:00 (UTC-3)	Rodriguinho 53'	Report	Betinho 54'	Stadium: Estádio Adelmar da Costa Carvalho (Ilha do Retiro); Attendance: 28,058; Referee: Rogério Oliveira

19 March 2006 6	Central	1–2	Sport	Caruaru
16:00 (UTC-3)	Tobias 76'		Fumagalli 20'; Geraldo	Stadium: Estádio Luiz Lacerda (Lacerdão)

26 March 2006 7	Santa Cruz	1–1	Sport	Recife
16:00 (UTC-3)	Carlinhos Paulista 87'		Anderson Aquino 29'	Stadium: Estádio José do Rego Maciel (Arruda)

29 March 2006 8	Sport	3–0	Ypiranga	Recife
20:30 (UTC-3)	Wellington 20'; Fumagalli 68'; Marcos Tamandaré 77'			Stadium: Estádio Adelmar da Costa Carvalho (Ilha do Retiro); Attendance: 21,334

2 April 2006 9	Sport	5–2	Vitória das Tabocas	Recife
16:00 (UTC-3)	Wellington; Bruno Recife, 63'; Kléber; Rodriguinho		Dinda; Laércio	Stadium: Estádio Adelmar da Costa Carvalho (Ilha do Retiro)

==== Finals ====
5 April 2006	Santa Cruz	1–2	Sport	Recife
21:45 (UTC-3)	Carlinhos Bala 88'	Report	Wellington 60' (pen.); Anderson Aquino 67'	Stadium: Estádio José do Rego Maciel (Arruda); Attendance: 22,186; Referee: Leonardo Gaciba

9 April 2006	Sport	0–1 (5–4 p)	Santa Cruz	Recife
16:00 (UTC-3)		Report	Bruno Recife 90+1' (o.g.)	Stadium: Estádio Adelmar da Costa Carvalho (Ilha do Retiro); Attendance: 33,282; Referee: Djalma Beltrami
	Penalties
	Leo Oliveira (penalty missed); Marcos Tamandaré (penalty scored); Geraldo (penalty scored); Durval (penalty missed); Wellington (penalty scored); Marco Antônio (penalty scored); Hamilton (penalty scored)		(penalty missed) Marco Brito; (penalty scored) Thiago Gentil; (penalty scored) Carlinhos Bala; (penalty scored) Alex Oliveira; (penalty missed) Lecheva; (penalty scored) Gilmar; (penalty missed) Neto

==== Record ====
Final Position	Points	Matches	Wins	Draws	Losses	Goals For	Goals Away	Avg%
1st	41	20	12	5	3	39	19	68%

=== Série B ===
15 April 2006 1	Avaí	1–2	Sport	Florianópolis
16:00 (UTC-3)	Fernando Silvério 36'	Report	Anderson Aquino 30'; Kleber Romero 70'	Stadium: Estádio Aderbal Ramos da Silva (Ressacada)

18 April 2006 2	Sport	3–0	Gama	Recife
20:30 (UTC-3)	Rodriguinho 16'; Kleber Romero 33'; Fumagalli 64'	Report		Stadium: Estádio Adelmar da Costa Carvalho (Ilha do Retiro); Attendance: 14,229; Referee: Manoel Sidney Aguiar

25 April 2006 3	Santo André	0–1	Sport	Santo André
20:30 (UTC-3)		Report	Fumagalli 5'	Stadium: Estádio Municipal Bruno José Daniel

2 May 2006 4	Sport	3–1	Remo	Recife
20:30 (UTC-3)	Fumagalli 59', 71'; Marcos Tamandaré 89'	Report	Lê 57'	Stadium: Estádio Adelmar da Costa Carvalho (Ilha do Retiro)

13 May 2006 5	Coritiba	1–1	Sport	Curitiba
16:00 (UTC-3)	Caio 24'	Report	Wellington 11'	Stadium: Estádio Major Antônio (Couto Pereira)

20 May 2006 6	América–RN	2–0	Sport	Natal
16:00 (UTC-3)	Souza 53'; Paulinho Kobayashi 83'	Report		Stadium: Estádio Dr. João Cláudio Vasconcelos Machado (Machadão)

23 May 2006 7	Sport	0–0	Atlético Mineiro	Recife
20:30 (UTC-3)		Report		Stadium: Estádio Adelmar da Costa Carvalho (Ilha do Retiro); Referee: João Alberto Gomes Duarte

27 May 2006 8	Paysandu	0–1	Sport	Belém
16:00 (UTC-3)			Fumagalli 73'	Stadium: Estádio Olímpico do Pará (Mangueirão)

30 May 2006 9	Sport	1–1	Marília	Recife
20:30 (UTC-3)	Maia 70'	Report	Creedence 57'	Stadium: Estádio Adelmar da Costa Carvalho (Ilha do Retiro); Referee: Francisco de Assis Almeida Filho

3 June 2006 10	Sport	1–2	CRB	Recife
16:00 (UTC-3)	Fumagalli 45+1'	Report	Bebeto 14'; Chiquinho 29'	Stadium: Estádio Adelmar da Costa Carvalho (Ilha do Retiro)

11 July 2006 11	Vila Nova	1–1	Sport	Goiânia
20:30 (UTC-3)	Vandinho 9'	Report	Bruno Recife 73'	Stadium: Estádio do Governo do Estado de Goiás (Serra Dourada); Referee: Philip Lombard

15 July 2006 12	Náutico	2–1	Sport	Recife
16:00 (UTC-3)	Danilo Lins 79'; Kléber 90+1' (o.g.)	Report	Adriano Magrão 40'	Stadium: Estádio Eládio de Barros Carvalho (Aflitos); Attendance: 12,221; Referee: Ricardo Tavares

22 July 2006 13	Sport	1–0	São Raimundo–AM	Recife
16:00 (UTC-3)	Durval 29'	Report		Stadium: Estádio Adelmar da Costa Carvalho (Ilha do Retiro)

29 July 2006 14	Ceará	2–2	Sport	Fortaleza
16:00 (UTC-3)	Juninho Cearense 37'; Leanderson 46'	Report	Jorge Guerra 36'; Fumagalli 60' (pen.)	Stadium: Estádio Governador Plácido Castelo (Castelão)

4 August 2006 15	Sport	1–2	Paulista	Recife
20:30 (UTC-3)	Fumagalli 90+3'	Report	Jaílson 52'; Rivaldo 78'	Stadium: Estádio Adelmar da Costa Carvalho (Ilha do Retiro)

11 August 2006 16	Sport	2–0	Ituano	Recife
20:30 (UTC-3)	Éverton 15'; Wellington 32'	Report		Stadium: Estádio Adelmar da Costa Carvalho (Ilha do Retiro); Attendance: 4,885; Referee: Wladyerisson Oliveira

15 August 2006 17	Brasiliense	2–0	Sport	Taguatinga
20:30 (UTC-3)	Warley 48'; Augusto César 76'	Report		Stadium: Elmo Serejo Farias Stadium (Boca do Jacaré)

19 August 2006 18	Sport	8–1	Guarani	Recife
16:00 (UTC-3)	Adriano Magrão 2', 51', 56', 70', 84'; Fumagalli 12' (pen.), 67'; Marco Antônio 37' (pen.)	Report	Edmilson 86'	Stadium: Estádio Adelmar da Costa Carvalho (Ilha do Retiro); Attendance: 12,266; Referee: Manoel Nunes Lopo Garrido

22 August 2006 19	Portuguesa	1–1	Sport	São Paulo
20:30 (UTC-3)	Mário Sérgio 64'	Report	Kleber Romero 65'	Stadium: Estádio Oswaldo Teixeira Duarte (Canindé)

2 September 2006 20	Sport	2–0	Avaí	Recife
15:45 (UTC-3)	Fumagalli 67'; Éverton 71'	Report		Stadium: Estádio Adelmar da Costa Carvalho (Ilha do Retiro); Attendance: 20,112; Referee: Fernando Assunção

5 September 2006 21	Gama	0–1	Sport	Brasília
20:30 (UTC-3)		Report	Wellington 37'	Stadium: Estádio Nacional de Brasília Mané Garrincha

8 September 2006 22	Sport	0–0	Santo André	Recife
20:30 (UTC-3)		Report		Stadium: Estádio Adelmar da Costa Carvalho (Ilha do Retiro); Attendance: 19,045; Referee: Marco Antônio da Silva Sampaio

12 September 2006 23	Remo	2–0	Sport	Belém
20:30 (UTC-3)	Alex Oliveira 66', 72'	Report		Stadium: Estádio Olímpico do Pará (Mangueirão)

16 September 2006 24	Sport	2–0	Coritiba	Recife
15:45 (UTC-3)	Jadílson 41', 65'	Report		Stadium: Estádio Adelmar da Costa Carvalho (Ilha do Retiro)

19 September 2006 25	Sport	2–0	América–RN	Recife
20:30 (UTC-3)	Bruno Recife 10'; Jadílson 25'	Report		Stadium: Estádio Adelmar da Costa Carvalho (Ilha do Retiro)

23 September 2006 26	Atlético Mineiro	2–0	Sport	Belo Horizonte
15:45 (UTC-3)	Rôni 17', 21'	Report		Stadium: Estádio Governador Magalhães Pinto (Mineirão); Attendance: 49,125; Referee: Luis Antônio Silva Santos

29 September 2006 27	Sport	4–2	Paysandu	Recife
20:30 (UTC-3)	Éverton 5'; Adriano Magrão 7', Bruno Recife	Report	Rogerinho 48'; Tête 50'	Stadium: Estádio Adelmar da Costa Carvalho (Ilha do Retiro)

3 October 2006 28	Marília	2–2	Sport	Marília
20:30 (UTC-3)	Márcio Richardes 50'; Téio 52'	Report	Fumagalli 35', 76'	Stadium: Estádio Municipal (Bento de Abreu) Sampaio Vidal; Attendance: 5,337; Referee: Enéas Eugênio de Aguiar

7 October 2006 29	CRB	1–1	Sport	Maceió
15:45 (UTC-3)	Nilson Sergipano 44'	Report	Wellington 90+1'	Stadium: Estádio Rei Pelé; Attendance: 12,609

10 October 2006 30	Sport	3–0	Vila Nova	Recife
20:30 (UTC-3)	Adriano Magrão 10'; Wellington 18'; Fumagalli 75'	Report		Stadium: Estádio Adelmar da Costa Carvalho (Ilha do Retiro); Attendance: 16,655; Referee: Arílson Bispo da Anunciação

21 October 2006 31	Sport	2–0	Náutico	Recife
15:45 (UTC-3)	Fumagalli 59', 65'	Report		Stadium: Estádio Adelmar da Costa Carvalho (Ilha do Retiro)

28 October 2006 32	São Raimundo–AM	0–1	Sport	Manaus
17:00 (UTC-4)		Report	Marco Antônio 47'	Stadium: Estádio Vivaldo Lima (Vivaldão)

31 October 2006 33	Sport	1–0	Ceará	Recife
20:30 (UTC-3)	Anderson Aquino 77'			Stadium: Estádio Adelmar da Costa Carvalho (Ilha do Retiro)

3 November 2006 34	Paulista	2–0	Sport	Jundiaí
20:30 (UTC-3)	Diogo Barcelos 11'; Dema 75'			Stadium: Estádio Dr. Jayme Cintra

7 November 2006 35	Ituano	1–1	Sport	Itu
17:30 (UTC-3)	Juliano 27'		Fumagalli 44'	Stadium: Estádio Municipal Dr. (Novelli Júnior)

10 November 2006 36	Sport	3–0	Brasiliense	Recife
20:30 (UTC-3)	Adriano Magrão 35'; Marco Antônio 42'; Ticão 77'			Stadium: Estádio Adelmar da Costa Carvalho (Ilha do Retiro)

18 November 2006 37	Guarani	2–0	Sport	Campinas
16:00 (UTC-3)	Túlio Souza 35'; Danilo 52'	Report		Stadium: Estádio Brinco de Ouro da Princesa; Attendance: 3,392; Referee: Giulliano Bozzano

25 November 2006 38	Sport	2–3	Portuguesa	Recife
16:00 (UTC-3)	Marco Antônio 44'; Fumagalli 55'	Report	Preto 45'; Rogério 78'; Alex Alves 89' (pen.)	Stadium: Estádio Adelmar da Costa Carvalho (Ilha do Retiro)

==== Record ====
Final Position	Points	Matches	Wins	Draws	Losses	Goals For	Goals Away	Avg%
2nd	64	38	18	10	10	57	36	56%
