= 2005 Sport Club do Recife season =

Sport Recife
2005 season
- Chairman: Luciano Bivar
- Manager: Heriberto da Cunha; Adilson Batista; Zé Teodoro; Edinho; Neco; Dorival Júnior
- Stadium: Ilha do Retiro
- Série B: 16th
- Pernambucano: 3rd
- Top goalscorer: League: Éder and Jadílson (4); All: Vinícius (8)
Home colours	Away colours

The 2005 season was Sport Recife's 101st season in the club's history. Sport competed in the Campeonato Pernambucano and Série B.

== Statistics ==
=== Overall ===
Games played	39 (18 Pernambucano, 21 Série B)
Games won	17 (9 Pernambucano, 8 Série B)
Games drawn	8 (5 Pernambucano, 3 Série B)
Games lost	14 (4 Pernambucano, 10 Série B)
Goals scored	57
Goals conceded	46
Goal difference	+11
Best results (goal difference)	4–0 (A) v Petrolina - Pernambucano - 2005.02.23
Worst result (goal difference)	1–4 (A) v Marília - Série B - 2005.08.20
Top scorer	Vinícius (8)

Source: Sport Recife official website

=== Goalscorers ===
Place	Pos.	Nat.	Name	Campeonato Pernambucano	Série B	Total
1	FW	(Brazil)	Vinícius	5	3	8
2	MF	(Brazil)	Cleiton Xavier	4	1	5
2	FW	(Brazil)	Rinaldo	3	2	5
3	FW	(Brazil)	Éder	0	4	4
3	FW	(Brazil)	Jadílson	0	4	4
3	DF	(Brazil)	Leo Oliveira	4	0	4
4	FW	(Brazil)	Bibi	0	3	3
4	FW	(Brazil)	Cristiano Brasília	3	0	3
5	MF	(Brazil)	Fabiano Gadelha	0	2	2
5	MF	(Brazil)	Lúcio Bala	2	0	2
5	MF	(Brazil)	Ramalho	0	2	2
5	MF	(Brazil)	Rodriguinho	0	2	2
6	FW	(Brazil)	Adriano Chuva	0	1	1
6	FW	(Brazil)	Anderson	1	0	1
6	DF	(Brazil)	Baggio	0	1	1
6	DF	(Brazil)	Cléber	1	0	1
6	DF	(Brazil)	Clécio	0	1	1
6	MF	(Brazil)	Cleisson	1	0	1
6	DF	(Brazil)	Gláuber	1	0	1
6	DF	(Brazil)	Marcos Tamandaré	0	1	1
6	DF	(Brazil)	Marquinhos	0	1	1
6	MF	(Brazil)	Pedro Neto	1	0	1
6	FW	(Brazil)	Reinaldo Aleluia	1	0	1
6	DF	(Brazil)	Sandro	1	0	1
			Own goals	0	1	1
			Total	28	29	57

== Competitions ==
=== Campeonato Pernambucano ===
==== First stage ====
16 January 2005 1	Sport	3–1	Petrolina	Recife
15:00 (UTC-3)	Cristiano Brasília 39'; Vinícius 78'; Pedro Neto 88'	Report	Aílton 14'	Stadium: Estádio Adelmar da Costa Carvalho (Ilha do Retiro); Attendance: 20,586; Referee: Antônio André

19 January 2005 2	Sport	1–2	Porto	Recife
20:30 (UTC-3)	Sandro 12'		Marcos Tamandaré 7'; João Neto 72'	Stadium: Estádio Adelmar da Costa Carvalho (Ilha do Retiro)

23 January 2005 3	Ypiranga	1–2	Sport	Santa Cruz do Capibaribe
16:00 (UTC-3)	Goal		Cristiano Brasília; Vinícius	Stadium: Estádio Otávio Limeira Alves

26 January 2005 4	Sport	0–0	Serrano	Recife
20:30 (UTC-3)				Stadium: Estádio Adelmar da Costa Carvalho (Ilha do Retiro)

31 January 2005 5	Santa Cruz	0–0	Sport	Recife
20:30 (UTC-3)				Stadium: Estádio José do Rego Maciel (Arruda)

3 February 2005 6	Sport	0–0	Itacuruba	Recife
20:30 (UTC-3)				Stadium: Estádio Adelmar da Costa Carvalho (Ilha do Retiro)

10 February 2005 7	Sport	1–0	Náutico	Recife
20:30 (UTC-3)	Cristiano Brasília 77'	Report		Stadium: Estádio Adelmar da Costa Carvalho (Ilha do Retiro); Attendance: 22,140; Referee: Cláudio Mercante

13 February 2005 8	Vitória das Tabocas	0–0	Sport	Vitória de Santo Antão
15:00 (UTC-3)				Stadium: Estádio Municipal Severino Cândido Carneiro (Carneirão)

20 February 2005 9	Manchete	1–4	Sport	Paulista
16:00 (UTC-3)	Goal		Gláuber; Lúcio Bala; Cleiton Xavier; Rinaldo	Stadium: Estádio Ademir Cunha

==== Second stage ====
23 February 2005 1	Petrolina	0–4	Sport	Petrolina
20:30 (UTC-3)			Cleiton Xavier; Rinaldo; Leo Oliveira; Lúcio Bala	Stadium: Estádio Paulo de Souza Coelho

27 February 2005 2	Porto	2–4	Sport	Caruaru
16:00 (UTC-3)	Téo,		Leo Oliveira, Vinícius (pen.); Cleiton Xavier	Stadium: Estádio Antônio Inácio de Souza

6 March 2005 3	Sport	3–0	Ypiranga	Recife
16:00 (UTC-3)	Anderson 59'; Cleisson 82'; Reinaldo Aleluia 85'			Stadium: Estádio Adelmar da Costa Carvalho (Ilha do Retiro)

13 March 2005 4	Serrano	0–2	Sport	Serra Talhada
16:00 (UTC-3)			Leo Oliveira; Vinícius	Stadium: Estádio Nildo Pereira (Pereirão)

20 March 2005 5	Sport	0–1	Santa Cruz	Recife
16:00 (UTC-3)		Report	Zada 45+1' (pen.)	Stadium: Estádio Adelmar da Costa Carvalho (Ilha do Retiro); Attendance: 28,554; Referee: Cláudio Mercante

23 March 2005 6	Itacuruba	2–0	Sport	Itacuruba
20:30 (UTC-3)	Alan Recife 30'; Alan Bahia 82'	Report		Stadium: Estádio Antônio Galdêncio Freire (Galdenção); Attendance: 1,429; Referee: Ricardo Tavares

28 March 2005 7	Náutico	4–2	Sport	Recife
20:30 (UTC-3)	Kuki 4', 56', 81'; Williams 64'	Report	Cleiton Xavier 24'; Vinícius 41'	Stadium: Estádio Eládio de Barros Carvalho (Aflitos); Attendance: 9,673; Referee: Antônio André

30 March 2005 8	Sport	2–0	Vitória das Tabocas	Recife
20:30 (UTC-3)	Cléber; Rinaldo			Stadium: Estádio Adelmar da Costa Carvalho (Ilha do Retiro)

3 April 2005 9	Sport	0–0	Manchete	Recife
16:00 (UTC-3)				Stadium: Estádio Adelmar da Costa Carvalho (Ilha do Retiro)

==== Record ====
Final Position	Points	Matches	Wins	Draws	Losses	Goals For	Goals Away	Avg%
3rd	32	18	9	5	4	28	14	59%

=== Série B ===
==== First stage ====
23 April 2005 1	São Raimundo	1–1	Sport	Manaus
16:00 (UTC-4)	Reginaldo 4'	Report	Ramalho 6'	Stadium: Estádio Vivaldo Lim (Vivaldão); Attendance: 6,841; Referee: Paulo Pereira

30 April 2005 2	Sport	2–0	União Barbarense	Recife
16:00 (UTC-3)	Rinaldo 64' (pen.); Éder 84'	Report		Stadium: Estádio Adelmar da Costa Carvalho (Ilha do Retiro)

8 May 2005 3	CRB	0–0	Sport	Maceió
16:00 (UTC-3)				Stadium: Estádio Rei Pelé

15 May 2005 4	Sport	1–2	Santo André	Recife
16:00 (UTC-3)	Rinaldo 19'	Report	Cristiano Brasília 15' (o.g.); Rodrigão 84'	Stadium: Estádio Adelmar da Costa Carvalho (Ilha do Retiro); Attendance: 27,448; Referee: Jorge Luiz da Silva

22 May 2005 5	Ituano	2–1	Sport	Itu
16:00 (UTC-3)	Neguette; Ricardo Lopes		Ramalho	Stadium: Estádio Municipal Dr. Novelli Júnior

27 May 2005 6	Sport	1–0	Guarani	Recife
20:30 (UTC-3)	Fabiano Gadelha 84'	Report		Stadium: Estádio Adelmar da Costa Carvalho (Ilha do Retiro)

4 June 2005 7	Santa Cruz	0–0	Sport	Recife
16:00 (UTC-3)		Report		Stadium: Estádio José do Rego Maciel (Arruda)

7 June 2005 8	Sport	3–0	Ceará	Recife
20:30 (UTC-3)	Éder 14'; Clécio 74'; Rodriguinho 85'	Report		Stadium: Estádio Adelmar da Costa Carvalho (Ilha do Retiro)

18 June 2005 9	Vitória	3–2	Sport	Salvador
16:00 (UTC-3)	Alecsandro (pen.), Vinícius		Adriano Chuva; Fabiano Gadelha	Stadium: Estádio Manoel Barradas (Barradão)

26 June 2005 10	Paulista	1–2	Sport	Jundiaí
16:00 (UTC-3)	Bosco 90+3'	Report	Vinícius, 71' (pen.)	Stadium: Estádio Doutor Jayme Pinheiro de Ulhôa Cintra (Jayme Cintra)

2 July 2005 11	Sport	5–2	Vila Nova	Recife
16:00 (UTC-3)	Bibi 21'; André 24' (o.g.); Rodriguinho 25'; Éder 52'; Marquinhos 80'	Report	Paulinho Kobayashi 44'; Laércio Júnior 73'	Stadium: Estádio Adelmar da Costa Carvalho (Ilha do Retiro); Attendance: 17,222; Referee: Mauro César Magalhães

8 July 2005 12	Avaí	3–0	Sport	Florianópolis
20:30 (UTC-3)	Naílton 10'; Samuel 71'; Beto 77'	Report		Stadium: Estádio Aderbal Ramos da Silva (Ressacada); Referee: Paulo Ricardo Felipe

16 July 2005 13	Sport	0–1	Grêmio	Recife
16:00 (UTC-3)		Report	Raone 47'	Stadium: Estádio Adelmar da Costa Carvalho (Ilha do Retiro); Referee: Wladyerisson Silva Oliveira

22 July 2005 14	Anapolina	1–0	Sport	Anápolis
20:30 (UTC-3)	Esley 72'	Report		Stadium: Estádio Jonas Duarte

30 July 2005 15	Sport	3–2	Náutico	Recife
16:00 (UTC-3)	Cleiton Xavier 27'; Marcos Tamandaré 77'; Bibi 80'	Report	Romualdo 48'; Cleisson 82'	Stadium: Estádio Adelmar da Costa Carvalho (Ilha do Retiro)

5 August 2005 16	Caxias	1–2	Sport	Caxias do Sul
20:30 (UTC-3)	Goal	Report	Vinícius 47'; Baggio 82'	Stadium: Estádio Francisco Stédile (Centenário)

9 August 2005 17	Sport	0–1	Criciúma	Recife
20:30 (UTC-3)		Report	Éder 75'	Stadium: Estádio Adelmar da Costa Carvalho (Ilha do Retiro); Attendance: 25,053; Referee: Wagner dos Santos Rosa

20 August 2005 18	Marília	4–1	Sport	Marília
16:00 (UTC-3)	Chico Marcelo 54'; Anaílson 63', 72'; Rafael Marques 67'	Report	Jadílson 83'	Stadium: Estádio Municipal (Bento de Abreu) Sampaio Vidal; Attendance: 3,096; Referee: Giulliano Bozzano

23 August 2005 19	Sport	3–2	Bahia	Recife
20:30 (UTC-3)	Éder; Jadílson,	Report	Dill; Rodriguinho	Stadium: Estádio Adelmar da Costa Carvalho (Ilha do Retiro)

2 September 2005 20	Portuguesa	4–2	Sport	São Paulo
20:30 (UTC-3)	Du Lopes 17'; Leandro Amaral 25', 43', 59'	Report	Bibi 35'; Jadílson 88'	Stadium: Estádio Oswaldo Teixeira Duarte (Canindé); Attendance: 1,787; Referee: Elvecio Zequetto

10 September 2005 21	Sport	0–2	Gama	Recife
16:00 (UTC-3)		Report	Maia 39', 52'	Stadium: Estádio Adelmar da Costa Carvalho (Ilha do Retiro); Attendance: 4,535; Referee: Wagner dos Santos Rosa

==== Record ====
Final Position	Points	Matches	Wins	Draws	Losses	Goals For	Goals Away	Avg%
16th	27	21	8	3	10	29	32	43%
