= 2014 São Paulo FC season =

São Paulo
2014 season
- Chairman: Juvenal Juvêncio; Carlos Miguel Aidar (Elected on 16 April)
- Manager: Muricy Ramalho
- Stadium: Estádio do Morumbi
- Série A: 2nd
- Campeonato Paulista: Quarter-finals
- Copa do Brasil: Third round
- Copa Sudamericana: Semi-finals
- Top goalscorer: League: Alexandre Pato & Luís Fabiano (9 each); All: Luís Fabiano (20 goals)
- Highest home attendance: 58,627 (v Cruzeiro in Campeonato Brasileiro)
- Lowest home attendance: 5,491 (v Audax in Campeonato Paulista)
| Home colours | Away colours |

The 2014 season was São Paulo's 85th year since the club's existence. The team played the Campeonato Paulista between January and March being defeated in the quarterfinal single match against Penapolense, after a 0–0 draw in the home stadium Morumbi, São Paulo's fall in the penalty shootout by 4–5. In the Copa do Brasil the club reach the third round when it was beaten by Bragantino with an aggregated score of 3-4 (2–1 away; 1–3 home). The second half of the year was most promising to the Muricy Ramalho's team, in Copa Sudamericana Tricolor was only defeated in the semifinals in face of Colombian club Atlético Nacional over again on penalty shootout this time by 1–4. In the national league Série A, the Dearest take a place in the Copa Libertadores ending the table on second place with 70 points, 10 behind the absolute champion Cruzeiro. The highlight of the year was the return of Kaká, the FIFA World Player of the Year in 2007. Kaká was loaned by American club Orlando City until the end of the season and played 24 matches scoring 3 goals. In the last match of midfielder at November 30, in a 1–1 draw against Figueirense in a game by 37th round of the league, Kaká was acclaimed for more than 30,000 São Paulo fans. Other highlight was noted by the 41 years old capitain Rogerio Ceni that announced the retirement at the end of season. The goalkeeper surpass the mark of 590 victories in official matches reached by Ryan Giggs, the feat was done in October 27 after a 3–0 victory over Goiás. Rogério also arrived the number of 123 goals, almost twice the mark of the second goalkeeper goalscorer Chilavert with 62 goals. Only two matches before the end of season Rogério postponed his retirement to 2015 season.

== Jogadores ==
Note: Flags indicate national team as defined under FIFA eligibility rules; some limited exceptions apply. Players may hold more than one non-FIFA nationality.

| No. | Pos. | Nation | Player |
|---|---|---|---|
| 01 | GK | BRA | Rogério Ceni (captain) |
| 2 | DF | BRA | Rafael Toloi |
| 3 | DF | BRA | Rodrigo Caio |
| 4 | DF | BRA | Antônio Carlos |
| 5 | MF | BRA | Souza (on loan from Grêmio) |
| 6 | DF | URU | Álvaro Pereira (on loan from Internazionale) |
| 7 | MF | BRA | Michel Bastos |
| 8 | MF | BRA | Kaká (on loan from Orlando City) |
| 9 | FW | BRA | Luís Fabiano (vice-captain) |
| 10 | MF | BRA | Paulo Henrique Ganso |
| 11 | FW | BRA | Alexandre Pato (on loan from Corinthians) |
| 12 | GK | BRA | Denis |
| 13 | DF | BRA | Paulo Miranda |
| 14 | FW | BRA | Alan Kardec |

| No. | Pos. | Nation | Player |
|---|---|---|---|
| 15 | MF | BRA | Denílson |
| 16 | DF | BRA | Reinaldo |
| 17 | FW | BRA | Osvaldo |
| 18 | MF | BRA | Maicon |
| 19 | FW | BRA | Ademilson |
| 21 | DF | BRA | Edson Silva |
| 24 | GK | BRA | Léo |
| 25 | MF | BRA | Hudson |
| 26 | DF | BRA | Auro Jr. |
| 27 | DF | BRA | Luis Ricardo |
| 29 | FW | BRA | Ewandro |
| 30 | GK | BRA | Renan Ribeiro |
| 34 | DF | BRA | Lucão |
| 35 | MF | BRA | Gabriel Boschilia |

Removed from first squad

Note: Flags indicate national team as defined under FIFA eligibility rules; some limited exceptions apply. Players may hold more than one non-FIFA nationality.

| No. | Pos. | Nation | Player |
|---|---|---|---|
| — | DF | ARG | Clemente Rodríguez |

=== Out on loan ===
Note: Flags indicate national team as defined under FIFA eligibility rules; some limited exceptions apply. Players may hold more than one non-FIFA nationality.

| No. | Pos. | Nation | Player |
|---|---|---|---|
| — | MF | BRA | Dener (on loan to América-RN) |
| — | FW | BRA | Rafinha (on loan to América-RN) |
| — | GK | BRA | Léo (on loan to Linense) |
| — | DF | BRA | Mateus Caramelo (on loan to Atlético Goianiense) |
| — | MF | BRA | Roni (on loan to Coritiba) |
| — | DF | BRA | Luiz Eduardo (on loan to Comercial) |
| — | DF | BRA | Thiago Carleto (on loan to Ponte Preta) |
| — | DF | BRA | Rafael Toloi (on loan to Roma) |
| — | DF | BRA | Luiz Eduardo (on loan to Boa Esporte) |
| — | MF | BRA | Pedrinho (on loan to Boa Esporte) |
| 37 | DF | BRA | Lucas Farias (on loan to Boa Esporte) |
| 5 | MF | BRA | Wellington (on loan to Internacional) |
| 28 | MF | BRA | João Schmidt (on loan to Vitória de Setúbal) |
| 21 | MF | ARG | Marcelo Cañete (on loan to Náutico) |

=== Transfers ===
==== In ====
Note: Flags indicate national team as defined under FIFA eligibility rules; some limited exceptions apply. Players may hold more than one non-FIFA nationality.

| No. | Pos. | Nation | Player |
|---|---|---|---|
| 27 | DF | BRA | Luis Ricardo (from Portuguesa) |
| 21 | MF | ARG | Marcelo Cañete (loan return from Portuguesa) |
| 6 | DF | URU | Álvaro Pereira (on loan from Internazionale) |
| 22 | FW | COL | Dorlan Pabón (on loan from Valencia) |
| 8 | MF | BRA | Souza (on loan from Grêmio) |
| 11 | FW | BRA | Alexandre Pato (on loan from Corinthians) |
| 25 | MF | BRA | Hudson (from Botafogo-SP) |
| 14 | FW | BRA | Alan Kardec (from Benfica) |
| 2 | DF | BRA | Rafael Toloi (loan return from Roma) |
| 8 | MF | BRA | Kaká (on loan from Orlando City) |
| 7 | MF | BRA | Michel Bastos (from Al Ain) |

==== Out ====
Note: Flags indicate national team as defined under FIFA eligibility rules; some limited exceptions apply. Players may hold more than one non-FIFA nationality.

| No. | Pos. | Nation | Player |
|---|---|---|---|
| — | FW | BRA | Negueba (return to Flamengo) |
| — | FW | BRA | Welliton (return to Spartak Moscow) |
| — | DF | BRA | Lúcio (to Palmeiras) |
| — | FW | BRA | Aloísio (to Shandong Luneng) |
| — | FW | BRA | Silvinho (to Ponte Preta) |
| 10 | MF | BRA | Jádson (to Corinthians) |
| 3 | DF | BRA | Roger Carvalho (return to Tombense) |
| 25 | MF | BRA | Fabrício (on loan to Vasco da Gama) |
| 22 | FW | COL | Dorlan Pabón (return to Valencia) |
| 23 | DF | BRA | Douglas (to Barcelona) |
| 20 | MF | BRA | Lucas Evangelista (to Udinese) |

== Statistics ==
=== Appearances and goals ===
| No. | Pos | Nat | Player | Total | | Campeonato Paulista | | Copa do Brasil | | Campeonato Brasileiro | | Copa Sudamericana | |
| No. | Pos | Nat | Player | Apps | Goals | Apps | Goals | Apps | Goals | Apps | Goals | Apps | Goals |
|---|---|---|---|---|---|---|---|---|---|---|---|---|---|
| 01 | GK | (Brazil) BRA | Rogério Ceni | 63 | 10 | 14+0 | 1 | 6+0 | 1 | 35+0 | 8 | 8+0 | 0 |
| 2 | DF | (Brazil) BRA | Rafael Toloi | 21 | 1 | 0+0 | 0 | 1+0 | 0 | 17+0 | 1 | 3+0 | 0 |
| 3 | DF | (Brazil) BRA | Rodrigo Caio | 25 | 1 | 13+0 | 1 | 4+0 | 0 | 8+0 | 0 | 0+0 | 0 |
| 4 | DF | (Brazil) BRA | Antônio Carlos | 40 | 7 | 15+0 | 4 | 4+0 | 0 | 18+1 | 2 | 1+1 | 1 |
| 5 | MF | (Brazil) BRA | Souza | 52 | 4 | 7+0 | 1 | 5+0 | 0 | 32+1 | 3 | 7+0 | 0 |
| 6 | DF | (Uruguay) URU | Álvaro Pereira | 45 | 1 | 11+0 | 1 | 6+0 | 0 | 21+0 | 0 | 6+1 | 0 |
| 7 | MF | (Brazil) BRA | Michel Bastos | 27 | 4 | 0+0 | 0 | 0+0 | 0 | 13+6 | 1 | 8+0 | 3 |
| 8 | MF | (Brazil) BRA | Kaká | 24 | 3 | 0+0 | 0 | 0+0 | 0 | 18+1 | 2 | 5+0 | 1 |
| 9 | FW | (Brazil) BRA | Luís Fabiano | 43 | 20 | 14+0 | 9 | 3+0 | 2 | 16+7 | 9 | 3+0 | 0 |
| 10 | MF | (Brazil) BRA | Paulo Henrique Ganso | 61 | 9 | 13+2 | 1 | 5+1 | 0 | 33+1 | 5 | 6+0 | 3 |
| 11 | FW | (Brazil) BRA | Alexandre Pato | 39 | 12 | 0+0 | 0 | 6+0 | 2 | 24+5 | 9 | 3+1 | 1 |
| 12 | GK | (Brazil) BRA | Denis | 5 | 0 | 2+0 | 0 | 0+0 | 0 | 3+0 | 0 | 0+0 | 0 |
| 13 | DF | (Brazil) BRA | Paulo Miranda | 28 | 1 | 3+1 | 0 | 2+1 | 1 | 11+4 | 0 | 6+0 | 0 |
| 14 | FW | (Brazil) BRA | Alan Kardec | 34 | 10 | 0+0 | 0 | 0+0 | 0 | 27+0 | 8 | 5+2 | 2 |
| 15 | MF | (Brazil) BRA | Denílson | 37 | 0 | 1+1 | 0 | 0+1 | 0 | 25+3 | 0 | 6+0 | 0 |
| 16 | DF | (Brazil) BRA | Reinaldo | 24 | 0 | 5+1 | 0 | 0+0 | 0 | 10+7 | 0 | 0+1 | 0 |
| 17 | FW | (Brazil) BRA | Osvaldo | 59 | 4 | 12+3 | 2 | 4+1 | 2 | 15+17 | 0 | 2+5 | 0 |
| 18 | MF | (Brazil) BRA | Maicon | 39 | 1 | 12+0 | 0 | 6+0 | 0 | 15+4 | 1 | 2+0 | 0 |
| 19 | FW | (Brazil) BRA | Ademilson | 37 | 5 | 10+5 | 3 | 3+2 | 1 | 7+8 | 1 | 1+1 | 0 |
| 21 | DF | (Brazil) BRA | Edson Silva | 35 | 5 | 2+0 | 0 | 1+1 | 0 | 23+0 | 4 | 8+0 | 1 |
| 24 | GK | (Brazil) BRA | Léo | 0 | 0 | 0+0 | 0 | 0+0 | 0 | 0+0 | 0 | 0+0 | 0 |
| 25 | MF | (Brazil) BRA | Hudson | 26 | 1 | 0+0 | 0 | 0+0 | 0 | 11+8 | 0 | 6+1 | 1 |
| 26 | DF | (Brazil) BRA | Auro Jr. | 14 | 0 | 0+0 | 0 | 0+0 | 0 | 10+2 | 0 | 1+1 | 0 |
| 27 | DF | (Brazil) BRA | Luis Ricardo | 16 | 1 | 10+1 | 1 | 2+0 | 0 | 2+1 | 0 | 0+0 | 0 |
| 29 | FW | (Brazil) BRA | Ewandro | 14 | 1 | 2+7 | 1 | 0+0 | 0 | 1+3 | 0 | 0+1 | 0 |
| 30 | GK | (Brazil) BRA | Renan Ribeiro | 0 | 0 | 0+0 | 0 | 0+0 | 0 | 0+0 | 0 | 0+0 | 0 |
| 34 | DF | (Brazil) BRA | Lucão | 15 | 2 | 1+0 | 0 | 1+0 | 1 | 9+0 | 1 | 1+3 | 0 |
| 35 | MF | (Brazil) BRA | Boschilia | 28 | 2 | 0+4 | 0 | 1+2 | 0 | 3+15 | 1 | 0+3 | 1 |
Players who are on loan/left São Paulo this season:
| 3 | DF | (Brazil) BRA | Roger Carvalho | 2 | 0 | 2+0 | 0 | 0+0 | 0 | 0+0 | 0 | 0+0 | 0 |
| 5 | MF | (Brazil) BRA | Wellington | 16 | 0 | 11+3 | 0 | 1+1 | 0 | 0+0 | 0 | 0+0 | 0 |
| 10 | MF | (Brazil) BRA | Jádson | 1 | 0 | 0+1 | 0 | 0+0 | 0 | 0+0 | 0 | 0+0 | 0 |
| 20 | MF | (Brazil) BRA | Lucas Evangelista | 4 | 1 | 1+3 | 1 | 0+0 | 0 | 0+0 | 0 | 0+0 | 0 |
| 21 | MF | (Argentina) ARG | Marcelo Cañete | 2 | 0 | 0+2 | 0 | 0+0 | 0 | 0+0 | 0 | 0+0 | 0 |
| 22 | FW | (Colombia) COL | Dorlan Pabón | 18 | 2 | 8+0 | 1 | 1+2 | 0 | 1+6 | 1 | 0+0 | 0 |
| 23 | DF | (Brazil) BRA | Douglas | 23 | 2 | 6+3 | 1 | 4+0 | 0 | 10+0 | 1 | 0+0 | 0 |
| 25 | MF | (Brazil) BRA | Fabrício | 0 | 0 | 0+0 | 0 | 0+0 | 0 | 0+0 | 0 | 0+0 | 0 |
| 26 | DF | (Argentina) ARG | Clemente Rodríguez | 0 | 0 | 0+0 | 0 | 0+0 | 0 | 0+0 | 0 | 0+0 | 0 |
| 28 | MF | (Brazil) BRA | João Schmidt | 1 | 0 | 1+0 | 0 | 0+0 | 0 | 0+0 | 0 | 0+0 | 0 |
| 37 | DF | (Brazil) BRA | Lucas Farias | 0 | 0 | 0+0 | 0 | 0+0 | 0 | 0+0 | 0 | 0+0 | 0 |

=== Top scorers ===
| Rank. | Pos. | Nat. | Player | Campeonato Paulista | Copa do Brasil | Campeonato Brasileiro | Copa Sudamericana | Total |
|---|---|---|---|---|---|---|---|---|
| 1 | FW | (Brazil) | Luís Fabiano | 9 | 2 | 9 | 0 | 20 |
| 2 | FW | (Brazil) | Alexandre Pato | 0 | 2 | 9 | 1 | 12 |
| 3 | FW | (Brazil) | Alan Kardec | 0 | 0 | 8 | 2 | 10 |
| = | GK | (Brazil) | Rogério Ceni | 1 | 1 | 8 | 0 | 10 |
| 5 | MF | (Brazil) | Paulo Henrique Ganso | 1 | 0 | 5 | 3 | 9 |
| 6 | DF | (Brazil) | Antônio Carlos | 4 | 0 | 2 | 1 | 7 |
| 7 | FW | (Brazil) | Ademilson | 3 | 1 | 1 | 0 | 5 |
| = | DF | (Brazil) | Edson Silva | 0 | 0 | 4 | 1 | 5 |
| 9 | MF | (Brazil) | Michel Bastos | 0 | 0 | 1 | 3 | 4 |
| = | FW | (Brazil) | Osvaldo | 2 | 2 | 0 | 0 | 4 |
| = | MF | (Brazil) | Souza | 1 | 0 | 3 | 0 | 4 |
| 12 | MF | (Brazil) | Kaká | 0 | 0 | 2 | 1 | 3 |
| 13 | MF | (Brazil) | Boschilia | 0 | 0 | 1 | 1 | 2 |
| = | FW | (Colombia) | Dorlan Pabón | 1 | 0 | 1 | 0 | 2 |
| = | DF | (Brazil) | Douglas | 1 | 0 | 1 | 0 | 2 |
| = | DF | (Brazil) | Lucão | 0 | 1 | 1 | 0 | 2 |
| 17 | DF | (Uruguay) | Álvaro Pereira | 1 | 0 | 0 | 0 | 1 |
| = | FW | (Brazil) | Ewandro | 1 | 0 | 0 | 0 | 1 |
| = | MF | (Brazil) | Hudson | 0 | 0 | 0 | 1 | 1 |
| = | MF | (Brazil) | Lucas Evangelista | 1 | 0 | 0 | 0 | 1 |
| = | DF | (Brazil) | Luis Ricardo | 1 | 0 | 0 | 0 | 1 |
| = | MF | (Brazil) | Maicon | 0 | 0 | 1 | 0 | 1 |
| = | DF | (Brazil) | Paulo Miranda | 0 | 1 | 0 | 0 | 1 |
| = | DF | (Brazil) | Rafael Toloi | 0 | 0 | 1 | 0 | 1 |
| = | DF | (Brazil) | Rodrigo Caio | 1 | 0 | 0 | 0 | 1 |
| | | | | 0 | 1 | 1 | 0 | 2 |
| TOTAL | | | | 28 | 11 | 59 | 14 | 112 |

=== Clean sheets ===
Includes all competitive matches. The list is sorted by shirt number when total clean sheets are equal.

Last updated on 27 November

| Rank. | Pos. | No. | Player | Campeonato Paulista | Copa do Brasil | Campeonato Brasileiro | Copa Sudamericana | Total |
|---|---|---|---|---|---|---|---|---|
| 1 | GK | 01 | (Brazil) Rogério Ceni | 6 | 3 | 13 | 3 | 25 |
| 2 | GK | 12 | (Brazil) Denis | 1 | 0 | 0 | 0 | 1 |
| TOTAL | | | | 7 | 3 | 13 | 3 | 26 |

=== Disciplinary record ===
| Pos | Nat | No. | Player | Campeonato Paulista | | | Copa do Brasil | | | Campeonato Brasileiro | | | Copa Sudamericana | | | Total | | |
| Pos | Nat | No. | Player | Booked | Double yellow card | Sent off (straight red) | Booked | Double yellow card | Sent off (straight red) | Booked | Double yellow card | Sent off (straight red) | Booked | Double yellow card | Sent off (straight red) | Booked | Double yellow card | Sent off (straight red) |
| GK | (Brazil) | 01 | Rogério Ceni | 0 | 0 | 0 | 1 | 0 | 0 | 1 | 0 | 0 | 1 | 0 | 0 | 3 | 0 | 0 |
| DF | (Brazil) | 2 | Rafael Toloi | 0 | 0 | 0 | 0 | 0 | 0 | 3 | 0 | 0 | 1 | 0 | 0 | 4 | 0 | 0 |
| DF | (Brazil) | 3 | Rodrigo Caio | 4 | 0 | 0 | 1 | 1 | 0 | 2 | 0 | 0 | 0 | 0 | 0 | 7 | 1 | 0 |
| DF | (Brazil) | 4 | Antônio Carlos | 3 | 0 | 0 | 0 | 0 | 0 | 5 | 0 | 0 | 0 | 0 | 0 | 8 | 0 | 0 |
| MF | (Brazil) | 5 | Souza | 1 | 0 | 0 | 1 | 0 | 0 | 6 | 0 | 0 | 1 | 0 | 0 | 9 | 0 | 0 |
| DF | (Uruguay) | 6 | Álvaro Pereira | 4 | 0 | 0 | 3 | 0 | 0 | 12 | 0 | 1 | 1 | 0 | 0 | 20 | 0 | 1 |
| MF | (Brazil) | 7 | Michel Bastos | 0 | 0 | 0 | 0 | 0 | 0 | 3 | 0 | 2 | 1 | 0 | 0 | 4 | 0 | 2 |
| MF | (Brazil) | 8 | Kaká | 0 | 0 | 0 | 0 | 0 | 0 | 7 | 0 | 0 | 1 | 0 | 0 | 8 | 0 | 0 |
| FW | (Brazil) | 9 | Luís Fabiano | 4 | 0 | 0 | 0 | 0 | 0 | 4 | 0 | 0 | 1 | 0 | 1 | 9 | 0 | 1 |
| MF | (Brazil) | 10 | Paulo Henrique Ganso | 2 | 1 | 0 | 2 | 0 | 0 | 9 | 0 | 0 | 1 | 0 | 0 | 14 | 1 | 0 |
| FW | (Brazil) | 11 | Alexandre Pato | 0 | 0 | 0 | 0 | 0 | 0 | 4 | 0 | 0 | 0 | 0 | 0 | 4 | 0 | 0 |
| GK | (Brazil) | 12 | Denis | 0 | 0 | 0 | 0 | 0 | 0 | 0 | 0 | 0 | 0 | 0 | 0 | 0 | 0 | 0 |
| DF | (Brazil) | 13 | Paulo Miranda | 2 | 0 | 0 | 0 | 0 | 0 | 3 | 0 | 1 | 1 | 0 | 0 | 6 | 0 | 1 |
| FW | (Brazil) | 14 | Alan Kardec | 0 | 0 | 0 | 0 | 0 | 0 | 2 | 0 | 0 | 1 | 0 | 0 | 3 | 0 | 0 |
| MF | (Brazil) | 15 | Denílson | 1 | 0 | 0 | 0 | 0 | 0 | 4 | 0 | 0 | 0 | 1 | 0 | 5 | 1 | 0 |
| DF | (Brazil) | 16 | Reinaldo | 1 | 0 | 0 | 0 | 0 | 0 | 3 | 0 | 0 | 0 | 0 | 0 | 4 | 0 | 0 |
| FW | (Brazil) | 17 | Osvaldo | 2 | 0 | 0 | 0 | 0 | 0 | 5 | 0 | 0 | 0 | 0 | 0 | 7 | 0 | 0 |
| MF | (Brazil) | 18 | Maicon | 2 | 0 | 0 | 1 | 0 | 0 | 5 | 0 | 0 | 1 | 0 | 0 | 9 | 0 | 0 |
| FW | (Brazil) | 19 | Ademilson | 0 | 0 | 0 | 0 | 0 | 0 | 1 | 0 | 0 | 0 | 0 | 0 | 1 | 0 | 0 |
| DF | (Brazil) | 21 | Edson Silva | 0 | 0 | 0 | 0 | 0 | 0 | 4 | 0 | 0 | 0 | 0 | 0 | 4 | 0 | 0 |
| GK | (Brazil) | 24 | Léo | 0 | 0 | 0 | 0 | 0 | 0 | 0 | 0 | 0 | 0 | 0 | 0 | 0 | 0 | 0 |
| MF | (Brazil) | 25 | Hudson | 0 | 0 | 0 | 0 | 0 | 0 | 3 | 0 | 0 | 2 | 0 | 0 | 5 | 0 | 0 |
| DF | (Brazil) | 26 | Auro Jr. | 0 | 0 | 0 | 0 | 0 | 0 | 1 | 0 | 0 | 0 | 0 | 0 | 1 | 0 | 0 |
| DF | (Brazil) | 27 | Luis Ricardo | 0 | 0 | 0 | 0 | 0 | 0 | 1 | 0 | 0 | 0 | 0 | 0 | 1 | 0 | 0 |
| FW | (Brazil) | 29 | Ewandro | 0 | 0 | 0 | 0 | 0 | 0 | 0 | 0 | 0 | 0 | 0 | 0 | 0 | 0 | 0 |
| GK | (Brazil) | 30 | Renan Ribeiro | 0 | 0 | 0 | 0 | 0 | 0 | 0 | 0 | 0 | 0 | 0 | 0 | 0 | 0 | 0 |
| DF | (Brazil) | 34 | Lucão | 0 | 0 | 0 | 0 | 0 | 0 | 1 | 0 | 0 | 1 | 0 | 0 | 2 | 0 | 0 |
| MF | (Brazil) | 35 | Boschilia | 0 | 0 | 0 | 0 | 0 | 0 | 0 | 0 | 0 | 0 | 0 | 0 | 0 | 0 | 0 |
Players who are on loan/left São Paulo this season:
| DF | (Brazil) | 3 | Roger Carvalho | 0 | 0 | 0 | 0 | 0 | 0 | 0 | 0 | 0 | 0 | 0 | 0 | 0 | 0 | 0 |
| MF | (Brazil) | 5 | Wellington | 5 | 0 | 0 | 0 | 0 | 0 | 0 | 0 | 0 | 0 | 0 | 0 | 5 | 0 | 0 |
| MF | (Brazil) | 10 | Jádson | 0 | 0 | 0 | 0 | 0 | 0 | 0 | 0 | 0 | 0 | 0 | 0 | 0 | 0 | 0 |
| MF | (Brazil) | 20 | Lucas Evangelista | 1 | 0 | 0 | 0 | 0 | 0 | 0 | 0 | 0 | 0 | 0 | 0 | 1 | 0 | 0 |
| MF | (Argentina) | 21 | Marcelo Cañete | 0 | 0 | 0 | 0 | 0 | 0 | 0 | 0 | 0 | 0 | 0 | 0 | 0 | 0 | 0 |
| FW | (Colombia) | 22 | Dorlan Pabón | 0 | 0 | 0 | 0 | 0 | 0 | 0 | 0 | 0 | 0 | 0 | 0 | 0 | 0 | 0 |
| DF | (Brazil) | 23 | Douglas | 0 | 0 | 0 | 0 | 0 | 0 | 3 | 0 | 0 | 0 | 0 | 0 | 3 | 0 | 0 |
| MF | (Brazil) | 25 | Fabrício | 0 | 0 | 0 | 0 | 0 | 0 | 0 | 0 | 0 | 0 | 0 | 0 | 0 | 0 | 0 |
| DF | (Argentina) | 26 | Clemente Rodríguez | 0 | 0 | 0 | 0 | 0 | 0 | 0 | 0 | 0 | 0 | 0 | 0 | 0 | 0 | 0 |
| MF | (Brazil) | 28 | João Schmidt | 0 | 0 | 0 | 0 | 0 | 0 | 0 | 0 | 0 | 0 | 0 | 0 | 0 | 0 | 0 |
| DF | (Brazil) | 37 | Lucas Farias | 0 | 0 | 0 | 0 | 0 | 0 | 0 | 0 | 0 | 0 | 0 | 0 | 0 | 0 | 0 |
| TOTAL | | | | 32 | 1 | 0 | 9 | 1 | 0 | 92 | 0 | 4 | 14 | 1 | 1 | 147 | 3 | 5 |

Last updated: 7 December
Source: Competitive matches
Ordered by (red card) , (second yellow card) and (yellow card)
(yellow card) = Number of bookings; (second yellow card) = Number of sending offs after a second yellow card; (red card) = Number of sending offs by a direct red card.

=== Managers performance ===
| Name | Nationality | From | To | P | W | D | L | GF | GA | % |
|---|---|---|---|---|---|---|---|---|---|---|
| Muricy Ramalho | Brazil | 19 January | 7 December | 65 | 35 | 14 | 16 | 109 | 68 | 61,02% |
| Milton Cruz (caretaker) | Brazil | 27 September | 4 October | 3 | 2 | 0 | 1 | 3 | 3 | 66,66% |

=== Overview ===
| Games played | 68 (16 Campeonato Paulista, 6 Copa do Brasil, 38 Campeonato Brasileiro, 8 Copa Sudamericana) |
| Games won | 37 (8 Campeonato Paulista, 4 Copa do Brasil, 20 Campeonato Brasileiro, 5 Copa Sudamericana) |
| Games drawn | 14 (4 Campeonato Paulista, 0 Copa do Brasil, 10 Campeonato Brasileiro, 0 Copa Sudamericana) |
| Games lost | 17 (4 Campeonato Paulista, 2 Copa do Brasil, 8 Campeonato Brasileiro, 3 Copa Sudamericana) |
| Goals scored | 112 |
| Goals conceded | 71 |
| Goal difference | +41 |
| Clean sheets | 26 |
| Yellow cards | 147 (32 Campeonato Paulista, 9 Copa do Brasil, 92 Campeonato Brasileiro, 14 Copa Sudamericana) |
| Second yellow cards | 3 (1 Campeonato Paulista, 1 Copa do Brasil, 0 Campeonato Brasileiro, 1 Copa Sudamericana) |
| Red cards | 5 (0 Campeonato Paulista, 0 Copa do Brasil, 4 Campeonato Brasileiro, 1 Copa Sudamericana) |
| Worst discipline | Álvaro Pereira (20 (yellow card) , 0, 1 (red card) ) |
| Best result | 4–0 (H) v Mogi Mirim - Campeonato Paulista - 2014.01.22; 4–0 (H) v Audax - Campeonato Paulista - 2014.03.05 |
| Worst result | 2–5 (A) v Fluminense - Campeonato Brasileiro - 2014.05.21 |
| Most appearances | Rogério Ceni (63) |
| Top scorer | Luís Fabiano (20) |

Source: Competitions

== Friendlies ==
| 16 January | São Paulo (Brazil) | 2–1 | United States | São Paulo |
| | Jádson; Luís Fabiano | | Wondolowski | Stadium: Estádio Nicolau Alayon |

| 20 June | Orlando City (United States) | 0–0 | (Brazil) São Paulo | Lake Buena Vista |
| 21:00 UTC−03:00 | | Report | | Stadium: ESPN Wide World of Sports |

== Competitions ==
=== Overall ===
| Competition | Started round | Current position / round | Final position / round | First match | Last match |
|---|---|---|---|---|---|
| Campeonato Paulista | — | — | Quarterfinal | 19 January | 26 March |
| Copa do Brasil | First Round | — | Third Round | 12 March | 13 August |
| Campeonato Brasileiro | — | — | 2nd | 20 April | 7 December |
| Copa Sudamericana | Second Round | — | Semifinals | 28 August | 26 November |

Source: Competitions

=== Campeonato Paulista ===
==== Results summary ====
| Overall | | | | | | | | Home | | | | | | Away | | | | | |
| Pld | W | D | L | GF | GA | GD | Pts | W | D | L | GF | GA | GD | W | D | L | GF | GA | GD |
|---|---|---|---|---|---|---|---|---|---|---|---|---|---|---|---|---|---|---|---|
| 16 | 8 | 4 | 4 | 28 | 15 | +13 | 28 | 5 | 3 | 1 | 18 | 5 | +13 | 3 | 1 | 3 | 10 | 10 | 0 |

Group A
| Pos | Team | Pld | W | D | L | GF | GA | GD | Pts |
|---|---|---|---|---|---|---|---|---|---|
| 1 | São Paulo | 15 | 8 | 3 | 4 | 28 | 15 | +13 | 27 |
| 2 | Penapolense | 15 | 6 | 1 | 8 | 14 | 17 | −3 | 19 |
| 3 | Linense | 15 | 5 | 1 | 9 | 9 | 21 | −12 | 16 |
| 4 | Comercial | 15 | 3 | 3 | 9 | 13 | 21 | −8 | 12 |
| 5 | Atlético Sorocaba | 15 | 2 | 5 | 8 | 16 | 29 | −13 | 11 |

==== First stage ====
| 19 January 1 | Bragantino | 2–0 | São Paulo | Bragança Paulista |
| 17:00 UTC−02:00 | Léo Jaime 35'; Cesinha 51' | Report (pt) | | Stadium: Estádio Nabi Abi Chedid (Nabizão); Attendance: 5,938; Referee: Cássio Luiz Zancopé |

| 22 January 2 | São Paulo | 4–0 | Mogi Mirim | São Paulo |
| 22:00 UTC−02:00 | Osvaldo 46'; Luís Fabiano 65'; Ademilson 75'; Douglas 86' | Report (pt) | | Stadium: Estádio Cícero Pompeu de Toledo (Morumbi); Attendance: 5,863; Referee: Luiz Flávio de Oliveira |

| 26 January 3 | São Paulo | 2–1 | Oeste | São Paulo |
| 17:00 UTC−02:00 | Antônio Carlos 25', 41' | Report (pt) | Bruno Nunes 81' | Stadium: Estádio Cícero Pompeu de Toledo (Morumbi); Attendance: 8,954; Referee: Alessandro Darcie |

| 29 January 4 | São Paulo | 6–3 | Rio Claro | São Paulo |
| 22:00 UTC−02:00 | Luís Fabiano 12', 16', 28'; Ademilson 56'; Ewandro 81'; Antônio Carlos 90+2' | Report (pt) | Á. Pereira 70' (o.g.); Léo Costa 84'; André Luiz 90+1' | Stadium: Estádio Cícero Pompeu de Toledo (Morumbi); Attendance: 5,895; Referee: Luiz Vanderlei Martinucho |

| 2 February 5 | Palmeiras | 2–0 | São Paulo | São Paulo |
| 17:00 UTC−02:00 | Valdivia 22'; Alan Kardec 79' (pen.) | Report (pt) | | Stadium: Estádio Municipal Paulo Machado de Carvalho (Pacaembu); Attendance: 23,694; Referee: Luiz Flávio de Oliveira |

| 6 February 6 | São Paulo | 2–0 | Paulista | São Paulo |
| 19:30 UTC−02:00 | Antônio Carlos 30'; Luís Fabiano 61' | Report (pt) | | Stadium: Estádio Cícero Pompeu de Toledo (Morumbi); Attendance: 6,593; Referee: Antonio Rogério Batista do Prado |

| 9 February 7 | Ponte Preta | 2–1 | São Paulo | Campinas |
| 17:00 UTC−02:00 | Silvinho 45'; Alemão 59' | Report (pt) | Rogério Ceni 57' (pen.) | Stadium: Estádio Moisés Lucarelli (Majestoso); Attendance: 5,900; Referee: Marcelo Prieto Alfieri |

| 15 February 8 | São Paulo | 0–0 | Portuguesa | São Paulo |
| 21:00 UTC−02:00 | | Report (pt) | | Stadium: Estádio Cícero Pompeu de Toledo (Morumbi); Attendance: 9,754; Referee: Flávio Rodrigues Guerra |

| 20 February 9 | São Bernardo | 1–1 | São Paulo | São Bernardo do Campo |
| 21:00 UTC−03:00 | Marino 39' | Report (pt) | Á. Pereira 23' | Stadium: Estádio Primeiro de Maio (Primeirão); Attendance: 12,840; Referee: Alessandro Darcie |

| 23 February 10 | São Paulo | 0–0 | Santos | São Paulo |
| 16:00 UTC−03:00 | | Report (pt) | | Stadium: Estádio Cícero Pompeu de Toledo (Morumbi); Attendance: 16,337; Referee: Marcelo Aparecido Ribeiro de Souza |

| 26 February 11 | XV de Piracicaba | 1–3 | São Paulo | Piracicaba |
| 22:00 UTC−03:00 | Cafu 2' | Report (pt) | Luis Ricardo 12'; Luís Fabiano 68'; Pabón 86' (pen.) | Stadium: Estádio Barão da Serra Negra; Attendance: 8,980; Referee: Norberto Luciano Santos |

| 5 March 12 | São Paulo | 4–0 | Audax | São Paulo |
| 22:00 UTC−03:00 | Luís Fabiano 51', 53'; Osvaldo 61'; Souza 76' | Report (pt) | | Stadium: Estádio Cícero Pompeu de Toledo (Morumbi); Attendance: 5,491; Referee: Antônio Rogério Batista do Prado |

| 9 March 13 | Corinthians | 2–3 | São Paulo | São Paulo |
| 16:00 UTC−03:00 | Antônio Carlos 9', 60' (o.g.) | Report (pt) | Ganso 39'; Luís Fabiano 51'; Rodrigo Caio 79' | Stadium: Estádio Municipal Paulo Machado de Carvalho (Pacaembu); Attendance: 29,119; Referee: Luiz Flávio de Oliveira |

| 16 March 14 | São Paulo | 0–1 | Ituano | São Paulo |
| 16:00 UTC−03:00 | | Report (pt) | Esquerdinha 13' | Stadium: Estádio Cícero Pompeu de Toledo (Morumbi); Attendance: 15,171; Referee: Cássio Luiz Zancopé |

| 23 March 15 | Botafogo-SP | 0–2 | São Paulo | Ribeirão Preto |
| 16:00 UTC−03:00 | | Report (pt) | Lucas Evangelista 42'; Ademilson 62' | Stadium: Estádio Santa Cruz; Attendance: 6,934; Referee: Rodrigo Guarizo Ferreira do Amaral |

==== Knockout stage ====
| 26 March Quarter-final | São Paulo | 0–0 (4–5 p) | Penapolense | São Paulo |
| 22:00 UTC−03:00 | | Report (pt) | | Stadium: Estádio Cícero Pompeu de Toledo (Morumbi); Attendance: 16,955; Referee: Alessandro Darcie |
| | Penalties |
| | Rogério Ceni (penalty scored); Luís Fabiano (penalty scored); Rodrigo Caio (penalty missed); Ganso (penalty scored); Osvaldo (penalty scored) | | (penalty scored) Guarú; (penalty scored) Petros; (penalty scored) Washington; (penalty scored) Douglas Tanque; (penalty scored) Neto |

=== Copa do Brasil ===
==== Results summary ====
| Overall | | | | | | | | Home | | | | | | Away | | | | | |
| Pld | W | D | L | GF | GA | GD | Pts | W | D | L | GF | GA | GD | W | D | L | GF | GA | GD |
|---|---|---|---|---|---|---|---|---|---|---|---|---|---|---|---|---|---|---|---|
| 6 | 4 | 0 | 2 | 11 | 6 | +5 | 12 | 2 | 0 | 1 | 7 | 3 | +4 | 2 | 0 | 1 | 4 | 3 | +1 |

==== First round ====
| 12 March First leg | CSA | 0–1 | São Paulo | Maceió |
| 22:00 UTC−03:00 | | Report (pt) | Osvaldo 54' | Stadium: Estádio Rei Pelé (Trapichão); Attendance: 15,000; Referee: Renan Roberto de Souza |

| 9 April Second leg | São Paulo | 3–0 (4–0 agg.) | CSA | São Paulo |
| 22:00 UTC−03:00 | Pato 19'; Luís Fabiano 77', 82' | Report (pt) | | Stadium: Estádio Cícero Pompeu de Toledo (Morumbi); Attendance: 28,742; Referee: Diego Almeida Real |

==== Second round ====
| 23 April First leg | CRB | 2–1 | São Paulo | Maceió |
| 22:00 UTC−03:00 | Tozin 33' (pen.); Diego Rosa 82' | Report (pt) | Ademilson 24' | Stadium: Estádio Rei Pelé (Trapichão); Attendance: 14,340; Referee: Pablo Ramon Gonçalves Pinheiro |

| 7 May Second leg | São Paulo | 3–0 (4–2 agg.) | CRB | São Paulo |
| 22:00 UTC−03:00 | Osvaldo 17'; Lucão 50'; Rogério Ceni 81' (pen.) | Report (pt) | | Stadium: Estádio Municipal Paulo Machado de Carvalho (Pacaembu); Attendance: 20,853; Referee: Ronan Marques da Rosa |

==== Third round ====
| 30 July 2014 First leg | Bragantino | 1–2 | São Paulo | Ribeirão Preto |
| 22:00 UTC−03:00 | Luisinho 83' | Report | Bruno Recife 16' (o.g.); Pato 76' (pen.) | Stadium: Estádio Santa Cruz; Attendance: 11,054; Referee: Thiago Duarte Peixoto |

| 13 August Second leg | São Paulo | 1–3 (3–4 agg.) | Bragantino | São Paulo |
| 22:00 UTC−03:00 | Paulo Miranda 7' | Report | Cesinha 22'; Gustavo Carbonieri 64'; Guilherme Mattis 74' | Stadium: Estádio Cícero Pompeu de Toledo (Morumbi); Attendance: 7,508; Referee: Flávio Rodrigues de Souza |

=== Campeonato Brasileiro ===
==== Results summary ====
| Overall | | | | | | | | Home | | | | | | Away | | | | | |
| Pld | W | D | L | GF | GA | GD | Pts | W | D | L | GF | GA | GD | W | D | L | GF | GA | GD |
|---|---|---|---|---|---|---|---|---|---|---|---|---|---|---|---|---|---|---|---|
| 38 | 20 | 10 | 8 | 59 | 40 | +19 | 70 | 11 | 6 | 2 | 32 | 16 | +16 | 9 | 4 | 6 | 27 | 24 | +3 |

==== Results by round ====
| Round | 1 | 2 | 3 | 4 | 5 | 6 | 7 | 8 | 9 | 10 | 11 | 12 | 13 | 14 | 15 | 16 | 17 | 18 | 19 | 20 | 21 | 22 | 23 | 24 | 25 | 26 | 27 | 28 | 29 | 30 | 31 | 32 | 33 | 34 | 35 | 36 | 37 | 38 |
|---|---|---|---|---|---|---|---|---|---|---|---|---|---|---|---|---|---|---|---|---|---|---|---|---|---|---|---|---|---|---|---|---|---|---|---|---|---|---|
| Ground | H | A | H | H | A | A | H | A | H | A | H | A | H | H | A | A | H | A | H | A | H | A | A | H | H | A | H | A | H | A | H | A | A | H | H | A | H | A |
| Result | W | D | D | D | W | L | W | D | W | W | L | L | D | W | W | W | W | D | W | W | W | L | L | D | L | W | W | L | W | D | W | W | W | W | D | W | D | L |
| Position | 1 | 2 | 7 | 10 | 7 | 8 | 7 | 8 | 4 | 3 | 6 | 8 | 7 | 5 | 5 | 4 | 2 | 3 | 2 | 2 | 2 | 2 | 2 | 3 | 3 | 3 | 2 | 3 | 2 | 2 | 2 | 2 | 2 | 2 | 2 | 2 | 2 | 2 |

Updated to match(es) played on 20 April. Source: São Paulo FC.net
A = Away; H = Home; W = Win; D = Draw; L = Loss

==== Matches ====
| 20 April 1 | São Paulo | 3–0 | Botafogo | São Paulo |
| 16:00 UTC−03:00 | Antônio Carlos 12'; Douglas 21'; Luís Fabiano 55' | Report | | Stadium: Estádio Cícero Pompeu de Toledo (Morumbi); Attendance: 31,564; Referee: Wilton Pereira Sampaio |

| 27 April 2 | Cruzeiro | 1–1 | São Paulo | Uberlândia |
| 16:00 UTC−03:00 | Júlio Baptista 50' | Report | Antônio Carlos 90+1' | Stadium: Estádio Municipal João Havelange (Parque do Sabiá); Attendance: 17,530; Referee: Wagner do Nascimento Magalhães |

| 3 May 3 | São Paulo | 2–2 | Coritiba | São Paulo |
| 18:30 UTC−03:00 | Pato 21'; Ademilson 72' | Report | Robinho 30'; Chico 61' | Stadium: Estádio Municipal Paulo Machado de Carvalho (Pacaembu); Attendance: 31,888; Referee: Cláudio Francisco Lima e Silva |

| 11 May 4 | São Paulo | 1–1 | Corinthians | Barueri |
| 16:00 UTC−03:00 | Luís Fabiano 79' | Report | Fagner 48' | Stadium: Arena Barueri; Attendance: 14,000; Referee: Antônio Cláudio Perin |

| 18 May 5 | Flamengo | 0–2 | São Paulo | Rio de Janeiro |
| 16:00 UTC−03:00 | | Report | Ganso 22', 90+1' | Stadium: Estádio Jornalista Mário Filho (Maracanã); Attendance: 25,118; Referee: Ricardo Marques Ribeiro |

| 21 May 6 | Fluminense | 5–2 | São Paulo | Rio de Janeiro |
| 22:00 UTC−03:00 | Walter 41', 65'; Lucão 52' (o.g.); Wágner 72'; Rafael Sóbis 75' | Report | Rogério Ceni 26' (pen.); Pato 44' | Stadium: Estádio Jornalista Mário Filho (Maracanã); Attendance: 17,035; Referee: Paulo Henrique de Godoy Bezerra |

| 24 May 7 | São Paulo | 1–0 | Grêmio | São Paulo |
| 21:00 UTC−03:00 | Lucão 60' | Report | | Stadium: Estádio Cícero Pompeu de Toledo (Morumbi); Attendance: 14,971; Referee: Wilton Pereira Sampaio |

| 28 May 8 | Atlético Paranaense | 2–2 | São Paulo | Uberlândia |
| 22:00 UTC−03:00 | Bady 29'; Cléo 90' | Report | Rogério Ceni 75' (pen.); Luís Fabiano 90+2' | Stadium: Estádio Municipal João Havelange (Parque do Sabiá); Attendance: 2,817; Referee: Anderson Daronco |

| 31 May 9 | São Paulo | 2–1 | Atlético Mineiro | São Paulo |
| 18:30 UTC−03:00 | Luís Fabiano 10'; Pabón 89' | Report | Josué 78' | Stadium: Estádio Cícero Pompeu de Toledo (Morumbi); Attendance: 27,530; Referee: Péricles Bassols Pegado Cortez |

| 16 July 10 | Bahia | 0–2 | São Paulo | Salvador |
| 22:00 UTC−03:00 | | Report | Rogério Ceni 13' (pen.); Alan Kardec 20' | Stadium: Arena Professor Octávio Mangabeira (Fonte Nova); Attendance: 17,482; Referee: Dewson Fernando Freitas da Silva |

| 19 July 11 | São Paulo | 0–1 | Chapecoense | São Paulo |
| 18:30 UTC−03:00 | | Report | Ricardo Conceição 57' | Stadium: Estádio Cícero Pompeu de Toledo (Morumbi); Attendance: 42,979; Referee: Felipe Gomes da Silva |

| 27 July 12 | Goiás | 2–1 | São Paulo | Goiânia |
| 16:00 UTC−03:00 | Amaral 44'; Bruno Mineiro 48' | Report | Kaká 76' | Stadium: Estádio do Governo do Estado de Goiás (Serra Dourada); Attendance: 12,845; Referee: Leandro Vuaden |

| 2 August 13 | São Paulo | 1–1 | Criciúma | São Paulo |
| 18:30 UTC−03:00 | Alan Kardec 73' | Report | Rodrigo Souza 80' | Stadium: Estádio Cícero Pompeu de Toledo (Morumbi); Attendance: 46,512; Referee: Ricardo Marques Ribeiro |

| 10 August 14 | São Paulo | 3–1 | Vitória | São Paulo |
| 18:30 UTC−03:00 | Pato 16', 38'; Alan Kardec 31' | Report | Kadu 45+2' | Stadium: Estádio Cícero Pompeu de Toledo (Morumbi); Attendance: 29,115; Referee: André Luiz de Freitas Castro |

| 17 August 15 | Palmeiras | 1–2 | São Paulo | São Paulo |
| 16:00 UTC−03:00 | Henrique 60' (pen.) | Report | Pato 53'; Alan Kardec 89' | Stadium: Estádio Municipal Paulo Machado de Carvalho (Pacaembu); Attendance: 20,267; Referee: Péricles Bassols Pegado Cortez |

| 20 August 16 | Internacional | 0–1 | São Paulo | Porto Alegre |
| 22:00 UTC−03:00 | | Report | Ganso 35' | Stadium: Estádio José Pinheiro Borda (Beira-Rio); Attendance: 29,267; Referee: Grazianni Maciel Rocha |

| 24 August 17 | São Paulo | 2–1 | Santos | São Paulo |
| 16:00 UTC−03:00 | Ganso 23'; Pato 87' | Report | Gabriel 85' (pen.) | Stadium: Estádio Cícero Pompeu de Toledo (Morumbi); Attendance: 31,159; Referee: Vinicius Furlan |

| 31 August 18 | Figueirense | 1–1 | São Paulo | Florianópolis |
| 16:00 UTC−03:00 | Giovanni Augusto 47' | Report | Rogério Ceni 76' (pen.) | Stadium: Estádio Orlando Scarpelli; Attendance: 15,803; Referee: Wilton Pereira Sampaio |

| 7 September 19 | São Paulo | 2–0 | Sport | São Paulo |
| 16:00 UTC−03:00 | Rithely 7' (o.g.); Pato 25' | Report | | Stadium: Estádio Cícero Pompeu de Toledo (Morumbi); Attendance: 25,072; Referee: Bráulio da Silva Machado |

| 10 September 20 | Botafogo | 2–4 | São Paulo | Brasília |
| 22:00 UTC−03:00 | Zeballos 19'; André Bahia 22' | Report | Alan Kardec 7'; Souza 36', 40'; Pato 80' | Stadium: Estádio Nacional Mané Garrincha; Attendance: 24,857; Referee: Marielson Alves da Silva |

| 14 September 21 | São Paulo | 2–0 | Cruzeiro | São Paulo |
| 16:00 UTC−03:00 | Rogério Ceni 35' (pen.); Alan Kardec 70' | Report | | Stadium: Estádio Cícero Pompeu de Toledo (Morumbi); Attendance: 58,627; Referee: Leandro Vuaden |

| 17 September 22 | Coritiba | 3–1 | São Paulo | Curitiba |
| 22:00 UTC−03:00 | Hélder 60'; Joel 63', 86' | Report | Michel Bastos 45+1' | Stadium: Estádio Major Antônio Couto Pereira; Attendance: 16,201; Referee: Dewson Fernando Freitas da Silva |

| 21 September 23 | Corinthians | 3–2 | São Paulo | São Paulo |
| 16:00 UTC−03:00 | Fábio Santos 35' (pen.), 65' (pen.); Guerrero 73' | Report | Souza 5'; Edson Silva 44' | Stadium: Arena Corinthians; Attendance: 34,688; Referee: Luiz Flávio de Oliveira |

| 24 September 24 | São Paulo | 2–2 | Flamengo | São Paulo |
| 22:00 UTC−03:00 | Rogério Ceni 16' (pen.); Luís Fabiano 90' | Report | Éverton 35'; Alecsandro 87' | Stadium: Estádio Cícero Pompeu de Toledo (Morumbi); Attendance: 16,571; Referee: André Luiz de Freitas Castro |

| 28 September 25 | São Paulo | 1–3 | Fluminense | São Paulo |
| 21:00 UTC−03:00 | Pato 57' | Report | Fred 52'; Wágner 72'; Conca 89' | Stadium: Estádio Cícero Pompeu de Toledo (Morumbi); Attendance: 16,076; Referee: Ricardo Marques Ribeiro |

| 4 October 26 | Grêmio | 0–1 | São Paulo | Porto Alegre |
| 16:20 UTC−03:00 | | Report | Rogério Ceni 54' (pen.) | Stadium: Arena do Grêmio; Attendance: 43,653; Referee: Felipe Gomes da Silva |

| 8 October 27 | São Paulo | 1–0 | Atlético Paranaense | São Paulo |
| 19:30 UTC−03:00 | Maicon 6' | Report | | Stadium: Estádio Cícero Pompeu de Toledo (Morumbi); Attendance: 9,795; Referee: Jailson Macedo Freitas |

| 12 October 28 | Atlético Mineiro | 1–0 | São Paulo | Belo Horizonte |
| 16:00 UTC−03:00 | Luan 72' | Report | | Stadium: Estádio Raimundo Sampaio (Independência); Attendance: 15,288; Referee: Marielson Alves Silva |

| 18 October 29 | São Paulo | 2–1 | Bahia | São Paulo |
| 18:30 UTC−03:00 | Rogério Ceni 39'; Ganso 78' | Report | Fahel 87' | Stadium: Estádio Cícero Pompeu de Toledo (Morumbi); Attendance: 21,961; Referee: Marcelo de Lima Henrique |

| 22 October 30 | Chapecoense | 0–0 | São Paulo | Chapecó |
| 22:00 UTC−02:00 | | Report | | Stadium: Arena Condá; Attendance: 15,095; Referee: Wagner Nascimento Magalhães |

| 27 October 31 | São Paulo | 3–0 | Goiás | São Paulo |
| 20:30 UTC−02:00 | Edson Silva 3'; Luís Fabiano 6'; Alan Kardec 58' | Report | | Stadium: Estádio Cícero Pompeu de Toledo (Morumbi); Attendance: 31,907; Referee: Bráulio da Silva Machado |

| 2 November 32 | Criciúma | 1–2 | São Paulo | Criciúma |
| 17:00 UTC−02:00 | Souza 70' | Report | Edson Silva 36'; Alan Kardec 75' | Stadium: Estádio Heriberto Hülse (Majestoso); Attendance: 12,388; Referee: Dewson Fernando Freitas da Silva |

| 9 November 33 | Vitória | 1–2 | São Paulo | Salvador |
| 17:00 UTC−02:00 | Kadu 56' | Report | Luís Fabiano 13'; Kaká 77' | Stadium: Estádio Manoel Barradas (Barradão); Attendance: 18,035; Referee: Wilton Pereira Sampaio |

| 12 November 35 | São Paulo | 1–1 | Internacional | São Paulo |
| 22:00 UTC−02:00 | Luís Fabiano 48' | Report | Paulão 17' | Stadium: Estádio Cícero Pompeu de Toledo (Morumbi); Attendance: 22,504; Referee: Heber Roberto Lopes |

| 16 November 34 | São Paulo | 2–0 | Palmeiras | São Paulo |
| 19:30 UTC−02:00 | Luís Fabiano 21'; Toloi 78' | Report | | Stadium: Estádio Cícero Pompeu de Toledo (Morumbi); Attendance: 36,764; Referee: Marcelo Aparecido Ribeiro de Souza |

| 23 November 36 | Santos | 0–1 | São Paulo | Cuiabá |
| 17:00 UTC−02:00 | | Report | Boschilia 54' | Stadium: Arena Pantanal; Attendance: 33,247; Referee: Flávio Rodrigues Guerra |

| 30 November 37 | São Paulo | 1–1 | Figueirense | São Paulo |
| 17:00 UTC−02:00 | Edson Silva 69' | Report | Mazola 84' | Stadium: Estádio Cícero Pompeu de Toledo (Morumbi); Attendance: 33,334; Referee: Antônio Denival de Morais |

| 7 December 38 | Sport | 1–0 | São Paulo | São Lourenço da Mata |
| 17:00 UTC−02:00 | Joelinton 3' | Report | | Stadium: Itaipava Arena Pernambuco; Attendance: 33,496; Referee: Wagner Reway |

=== Copa Sudamericana ===
==== Results summary ====
| Overall | | | | | | | | Home | | | | | | Away | | | | | |
| Pld | W | D | L | GF | GA | GD | Pts | W | D | L | GF | GA | GD | W | D | L | GF | GA | GD |
|---|---|---|---|---|---|---|---|---|---|---|---|---|---|---|---|---|---|---|---|
| 8 | 5 | 0 | 3 | 14 | 10 | +4 | 15 | 4 | 0 | 0 | 8 | 2 | +6 | 1 | 0 | 3 | 6 | 8 | −2 |

==== Second stage ====
| 28 August First leg | Criciúma (Brazil) | 2–1 | (Brazil) São Paulo | Criciúma |
| 20:00 UTC−03:00 | Silvinho 15'; Lucca 42' | Report | Pato 26' | Stadium: Estádio Heriberto Hülse (Majestoso); Attendance: 8,036; Referee: Julio Bascuñán (Chile) |

| 4 September Second leg | São Paulo (Brazil) | 2–0 (3–2 agg.) | (Brazil) Criciúma | São Paulo |
| 20:00 UTC−03:00 | Edson Silva 32'; Kaká 40' | Report | | Stadium: Estádio Cícero Pompeu de Toledo (Morumbi); Attendance: 10,140; Referee: Ricardo Marques Ribeiro (Brazil) |

==== Round of 16 ====
| 30 September First leg | São Paulo (Brazil) | 1–0 | (Chile) Huachipato | São Paulo |
| 20:30 UTC−03:00 | Michel Bastos 55' | Report | | Stadium: Estádio Cícero Pompeu de Toledo (Morumbi); Attendance: 5,545; Referee: Christian Ferreyra (Uruguay) |

| 15 October Second leg | Huachipato (Chile) | 2–3 (2–4 agg.) | (Brazil) São Paulo | Talcahuano |
| 19:30 UTC−03:00 | Vilches 20'; Sagal 87' | Report | Michel Bastos 9'; Ganso 22'; Boschilia 89' | Stadium: Estadio CAP; Attendance: 9,020; Referee: Antonio Arias (Paraguay) |

==== Quarterfinals ====
| 30 October First leg | São Paulo (Brazil) | 4–2 | (Ecuador) Emelec | São Paulo |
| 20:15 UTC−02:00 | Michel Bastos 11'; Hudson 35'; Alan Kardec 44'; Antônio Carlos 69' | Report | Bolaños 47'; Mena 54' | Stadium: Estádio Cícero Pompeu de Toledo (Morumbi); Attendance: 22,705; Referee: Enrique Cáceres (Paraguay) |

| 5 November Second leg | Emelec (Ecuador) | 3–2 (5–6 agg.) | (Brazil) São Paulo | Guayaquil |
| 22:00 UTC−02:00 | Bolaños 1', 48' (pen.), 52' (pen.) | Report | Alan Kardec 28'; Ganso 39' | Stadium: Estadio George Capwell; Referee: Enrique Osses (Chile) |

==== Semifinals ====
| 19 November First leg | Atlético Nacional (Colombia) | 1–0 | (Brazil) São Paulo | Medellín |
| 22:00 UTC−02:00 | Ruiz 34' | Report | | Stadium: Estadio Atanasio Girardot; Attendance: 44,260; Referee: Daniel Fedorczuk (Uruguay) |

| 26 November Second leg | São Paulo (Brazil) | 1–0 (1–1 agg.) (1–4 p) | (Colombia) Atlético Nacional | São Paulo |
| 22:00 UTC−02:00 | Ganso 53' | Report | | Stadium: Estádio Cícero Pompeu de Toledo (Morumbi); Attendance: 45,454; Referee: Roddy Zambrano (Ecuador) |
| | Penalties |
| | Alan Kardec (penalty missed); Rogério Ceni (penalty scored); Toloi (penalty missed) | | (penalty scored) Bocanegra; (penalty scored) Valencia; (penalty scored) Cardona; (penalty scored) Ruiz |
