= Jadílson =

Jadílson is a given name. It may refer to:

- Jadílson (footballer, born 1977), José Jadílson dos Santos Silva, Brazilian football left-back
- Jadílson (footballer, born 1980), Jadílson Carlos da Silva, Brazilian football striker
