= Fabiano Gadelha =

Brazilian footballer (born 1979)

Personal information
- Full name: Fabiano Ferreira Gadelha
- Date of birth: 9 January 1979 (age 47)
- Place of birth: Bayeux, Brazil
- Height: 1.71 m (5 ft 7 in)
- Position: Attacking midfielder

Senior career*
Years	Team	Apps	(Gls)
1997–1999	Sport Recife		
2000	Íbis		
2000–2001	Sport Recife		
2001	Vitória-PE		
2002–2003	Fortaleza		
2003	ABC		
2004	Treze		
2004	Sergipe		
2005	Sport Recife		
2006	Rio Branco		
2006	São Caetano		
2006–2008	Marília		
2008	→ Pohang Steelers (loan)	0	(0)
2008	Náutico	5	(0)
2008	ABC		
2008–2009	Marília	13	(6)
2009–2010	Ponte Preta	45	(11)
2010	Grêmio Prudente	9	(0)
2011	Brasiliense	4	(1)
2012	Boavista	11	(1)
2012	Marília	5	(1)
2013–2014	Pelotas	22	(3)
2014	Juventus	1	(0)
2015	Marília	9	(0)
2015	VOCEM		
2017	Marília	8	(0)
- * Club domestic league appearances and goals

Fabiano Ferreira Gadelha (born 9 January 1979) is a Brazilian former professional footballer who played as an attacking midfielder.

== Career ==
Born in Bayeux, Paraíba, Fabiano Gadelha began playing professional football with Sport. He was used in several midfield positions but never found a regular place in the squad. After spells with Rio Branco and São Caetano, Fabiano Gadelha made a break-through with Marília. During 2007, he scored 15 goals for the club (11 of them in Campeonato Brasileiro Série B) playing as an attacking midfielder, which led to a six-month loan at Korean side Pohang Steelers.

His previous clubs include ABC, Náutico, Marília, São Caetano, Rio Branco, Sport Recife, Sergipe, Treze, Fortaleza, Vitória-PE, Ponte Preta and Pohang Steelers in South Korea.

== Honors ==
Sport Recife

- Campeonato Pernambucano: 1997

Fortaleza

- Campeonato Cearense: 2003
