= Kleber Romero =

Brazilian footballer and manager

Personal information
- Date of birth: 14 February 1976 (age 50)
- Place of birth: Santa Cecília do Pavão, Brazil
- Height: 1.87 m (6 ft 2 in)
- Position: Midfielder

Senior career*
Years	Team	Apps	(Gls)
1997–1998	Matsubara		
1998	Mirassol		
1998	Maringá		
1999	Consadole Sapporo	1	(0)
2001	Mirassol		
2003	Coríntians		
2003	Campinense		
2004–2005	Treze		
2006	Criciúma		
2006	Sport Recife		
2007	São Caetano		
2007	Adap Galo Maringá		
2008	Vila Nova		
2008	São Caetano		
2009	Campinense	24	(1)
2010	Rio Branco-SP		

Managerial career
- 2017–2019: Treze (assistant)
- 2019: Treze
- * Club domestic league appearances and goals

Kleber Romero (born 14 February 1976) is a Brazilian football coach and former player who played as a midfielder.

== Playing career ==
Kleber Romero is notable for his appearance in the J2 League for Consadole Sapporo in 1999, and for playing in Campeonato Brasileiro Série B with Sport Club do Recife in 2006, São Caetano in 2007, Vila Nova in 2008 and Campinense in 2009.

He has also represented a number of other Brazilian clubs, including Matsubara, Mirassol, Maringá, Treze, Criciúma and Rio Branco-SP.

== Managerial career ==
Kleber Romero was appointed sporting director of the football department of Campinense in October 2012. After winning the 2013 Copa do Nordeste he left at the end of the 2014 season to take up the same role with CSE-AL.

He was appointed assistant coach by Treze in October 2017, and has taken interim charge of the team on a number of occasions, the most recent occasion being March 2019.
