= Marco Antônio (footballer, born 1984) =

Brazilian footballer

Personal information
- Full name: Marco Antônio Miranda Filho
- Date of birth: 9 November 1984 (age 42)
- Place of birth: São Paulo, Brazil
- Height: 1.82 m (6 ft 0 in)
- Position: Midfielder

Team information
- Current team: Portuguesa (technical coordinator)

Youth career
- 2003–2004: São Paulo

Senior career*
Years	Team	Apps	(Gls)
2003–2007	São Paulo	34	(3)
2004	→ Náutico (loan)	25	(8)
2005	→ Santo André (loan)	11	(0)
2006	→ Juventude (loan)	8	(0)
2006	→ Sport Recife (loan)	4	(0)
2007	→ América-SP (loan)	10	(2)
2007	→ Criciúma (loan)	12	(1)
2008	Vitória	23	(0)
2009–2011	Portuguesa	128	(21)
2012–2014	Grêmio	50	(3)
2013	→ Atlético Paranaense (loan)	5	(1)
2014	→ Figueirense (loan)	32	(3)
2015–2016	Al-Khor	34	(6)
2016–2017	Náutico	21	(5)
2017–2018	Figueirense	23	(0)
- * Club domestic league appearances and goals

Marco Antônio Miranda Filho (born 11 November 1984), known as Marco Antônio, is a Brazilian retired footballer who plays as a midfielder. He is the current technical coordinator of Portuguesa.

== Honours ==
'Náutico

- Campeonato Pernambucano: 2004

São Paulo

- Campeonato Paulista: 2005
- Copa Libertadores: 2005

Sport Recife

- Campeonato Pernambucano: 2006

Vitória

- Campeonato Baiano: 2008

Portuguesa

- Campeonato Brasileiro Série B: 2011
