= Éverton (footballer, born 1983) =

Brazilian footballer

Personal information
- Full name: Éverton Barbosa da Hora
- Date of birth: October 2, 1983 (age 43)
- Place of birth: Recife, Brazil
- Height: 1.71 m (5 ft 7 in)
- Position: Defensive midfielder

Youth career
- 2002–2003: Sport

Senior career*
Years	Team	Apps	(Gls)
2004–2008	Sport	27	(0)
2005	→ Ponte Preta (loan)	32	(1)
2008–2009	Goiás	22	(1)
2010	Sertãozinho	18	(1)
2010	América de Natal	12	(0)
2011	Náutico	59	(2)
2012	Guaratinguetá	7	(0)
2012	Luverdense	2	(0)
2012	Boa Esporte	22	(1)
2013	Fortaleza	15	(0)
2014–2015	Santa Cruz		
- * Club domestic league appearances and goals

Éverton Barbosa da Hora (born October 2, 1983), or simply Éverton, is a Brazilian former professional footballer who played as a defensive midfielder. On August 17, 2008, his dismissal from the Football Club Sport Recife was announced.
