= Possato =

Brazilian footballer

Personal information
- Full name: Alan dos Santos Possato
- Date of birth: January 30, 1979 (age 47)
- Place of birth: Rio de Janeiro, Brazil
- Height: 1.76 m (5 ft 9 in)
- Position: Left back

Youth career
- 1998–2001: Vasco da Gama

Senior career*
Years	Team	Apps	(Gls)
2002	América		
2003	Caxias		
2003	Bahia		
2004	Marília		
2004	Brasiliense		
2005–2008	Sport		
2006	→ Ceará (loan)		
2006	→ Atlético Goianiense (loan)		
2007	→ Vila Nova (Loan)		
2009	Santa Helena		
2010	Botafogo-DF		
2011	Bangu		
2011	América		
- * Club domestic league appearances and goals

Alan dos Santos Possato or simply Possato (born January 30, 1979), is a Brazilian football player who plays left back.

== Honours ==
Brasiliense

- Campeonato Brasiliense: 2004

Ceará

- Campeonato Cearense: 2006
