= Antônio Carlos (footballer, born 1983) =

Brazilian footballer

Personal information
- Full name: Antônio Carlos dos Santos Aguiar
- Date of birth: 22 June 1983 (age 43)
- Place of birth: Rio de Janeiro, Brazil
- Height: 1.85 m (6 ft 1 in)
- Position: Centre back

Youth career
- 2002: Fluminense

Senior career*
Years	Team	Apps	(Gls)
2003–2005	Fluminense	92	(14)
2005–2007	Ajaccio	53	(3)
2007–2013	Atlético Paranaense	82	(14)
2009	→ Atlético Goianiense (loan)	14	(4)
2010–2013	→ Botafogo (loan)	88	(13)
2013–2015	São Paulo	35	(5)
2015	Fluminense	17	(0)
2016	Avaí	4	(0)
2016	Ceará	6	(0)
2017	Boavista	5	(0)
2018	Brusque	7	(0)
2018	Magallanes	1	(0)
2019	Brasiliense	0	(0)
2020	Olaria	6	(0)
- * Club domestic league appearances and goals as of 12 November 2018

Antônio Carlos dos Santos Aguiar (born 22 June 1983), or simply Antônio Carlos, is a Brazilian former footballer who played as a central defender. He is currently an commentator for Botafogo TV.

== Career ==
Born in Rio de Janeiro, Brazil, Antônio Carlos signed with Atlético Paranaense moving from AC Ajaccio on 27 July 2007.

== Honours ==
Fluminense

- Taça Rio: 2005
- Rio de Janeiro State League: 2005

Atlético Paranaense

- Paraná State League: 2009

Botafogo

- Taça Guanabara: 2010, 2013
- Taça Rio: 2010, 2012, 2013
- Rio de Janeiro State League: 2010, 2013
