= Lê (footballer, born 1984) =

Brazilian footballer

Personal information
- Full name: Leonardo Hermes Lau
- Date of birth: December 18, 1984 (age 41)
- Place of birth: Santa Cruz do Sul, Brazil
- Height: 1.80 m (5 ft 11 in)
- Position: Attacking midfielder

Team information
- Current team: SC Medegole

Youth career
- 2003: Atlético-PR

Senior career*
| Years | Team | Apps | (Gls) |
| 2004–2008 | Atlético-PR | 2 | (1) |
| 2004 | → Juventude (Loan) | | |
| 2005 | → Ceará (Loan) | | |
| 2006 | → Marília (Loan) | | |
| 2006 | → Remo (Loan) | | |
| 2006–2007 | → ABC (Loan) | | |
| 2008–2009 | Ulbra-RS | | |
| 2009–2010 | Caxias | 8 | (0) |
| 2011 | São José | | |
| 2011 | Esportivo | | |
| 2011 | Brusque | 6 | (0) |
| 2011– | Novo Hamburgo | | |
- * Club domestic league appearances and goals

Leonardo Hermes Lau or simply Lê (born December 18, 1984, in Santa Cruz do Sul), was a Brazilian attacking midfielder. He used to play for Esporte Clube Novo Hamburgo. Now he is a medical student at Universidade de Caxias do Sul.

== Honours ==
- Paraná State League: 2005
- Rio Grande do Norte State League: 2007
- Tricampeão da Copa Poloca: 2017/1-2017/2 - 2018/1
