= Kadu (footballer, born 1986) =

Brazilian footballer

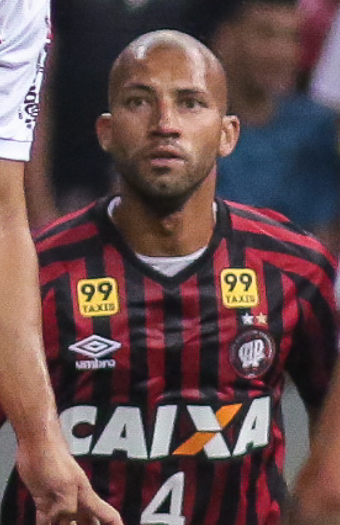
- Kadu in 2015

Personal information
- Full name: Ricardo Martins de Araújo
- Date of birth: 20 July 1986 (age 40)
- Place of birth: Brasília, Brazil
- Height: 1.89 m (6 ft 2 in)
- Position: Centre-back

Team information
- Current team: Penapolense

Youth career
- Paranoá
- 2005–2006: Guarani

Senior career*
Years	Team	Apps	(Gls)
2006	Guarani	4	(0)
2007	Bragantino	14	(0)
2007–2012	Corinthians	7	(0)
2008–2009	→ Bragantino (loan)	36	(2)
2010	→ Figueirense (loan)	0	(0)
2011	→ Bragantino (loan)	2	(0)
2012–2013	Bragantino	37	(1)
2013	Vitória	18	(0)
2014	Braga B	3	(0)
2014	Braga	1	(0)
2014–2015	Vitória	30	(4)
2015	Atlético Paranaense	31	(1)
2016–2017	Grêmio	3	(0)
2016–2017	→ Ponte Preta (loan)	16	(0)
2017	Ponte Preta	7	(0)
2017–2019	Göztepe	27	(1)
2020–2022	Chapecoense	17	(0)
2022	Coimbra	0	(0)
2022	→ Villa Nova (loan)	12	(3)
2022	Figueirense	10	(0)
2022–2023	Capital CF	7	(0)
2023	Oeste	6	(0)
2024	Luverdense	5	(0)
2025–	Penapolense	0	(0)
- * Club domestic league appearances and goals as of 18 September 2022

Ricardo Martins de Araújo (born 20 July 1986), commonly known as Kadu, is a Brazilian professional footballer who plays as a central defender for Luverdense.

== Career ==
Kadu started his career in Bragantino since the 2006 season. In 2007 Kadu have good actions with Bragantino (fourth place in Campeonato Paulista), and signed to Corinthians, to play Brazilian League.

For Corinthians, Kadu started in the match against Sport Recife, in a nightmare game Kadu scored an own goal against Atlético Paranaense. Before this fact, and the exit of the coach, Paulo César Carpegiani, Kadu had never played any other game for the club.

== Honours ==
Chapecoense

- Campeonato Catarinense: 2020
- Campeonato Brasileiro Série B: 2020
