= Rinaldo (footballer, born 1975) =

Brazilian footballer

Personal information
- Full name: Rinaldo Santana dos Santos
- Date of birth: August 24, 1975 (age 51)
- Place of birth: Rio Piracicaba-MG, Brazil
- Height: 1.69 m (5 ft 7 in)
- Position: Striker

Team information
- Current team: Guarany de Sobral

Senior career*
Years	Team	Apps	(Gls)
1998–2000	América-MG	21	(1)
2000	Atlético Mineiro		
2000	Atlético-PR	12	(0)
2001	Paraná		
2002	São Caetano	4	(0)
2003	Guarani	21	(0)
2004	Fortaleza	13	(14)
2004	FC Seoul	11	(1)
2005	Sport		
2006–2007	Fortaleza	32	(16)
2007–2008	Goiás	22	(2)
2008	Fortaleza		
2009	América-RN		
2010	Fortaleza	3	(0)
2011	Uberlândia		
2011	Marília	5	(0)
2012–	Guarany de Sobral		
- * Club domestic league appearances and goals as of 30 August 2011

Rinaldo Santana dos Santos (born August 24, 1975, in Rio Piracicaba-MG), or simply Rinaldo, is a Brazilian striker. He currently plays for Guarany Sporting Club.

== Career ==
He played South Korean side FC Seoul in 2004.

== Honours ==
- Campeonato Cearense:2007
