= Bayeux, Paraíba =

Coordinates: 7°08′S 34°56′W

Bayeux
- Municipality
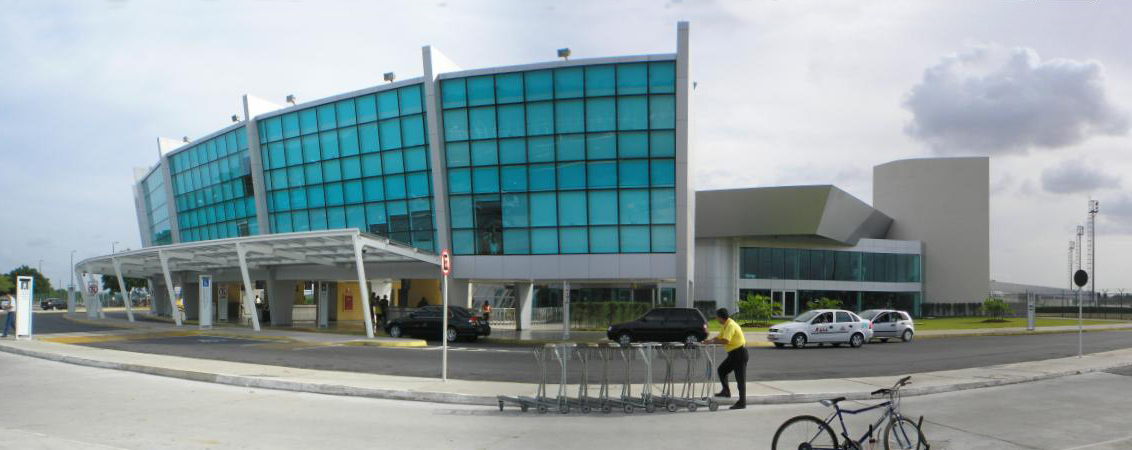
- Presidente Castro Pinto International Airport

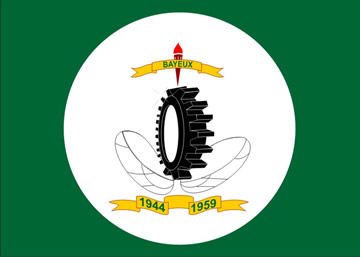
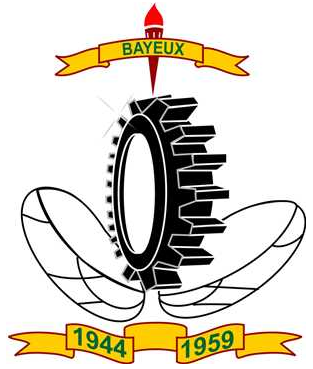
- Flag Coat of arms
- Interactive map of Bayeux
- Country: Brazil
- Region: Northeast
- State: Paraíba
- Mesoregion: Mata Paraibana

Population (2020)
  - Total: 97,203
- Time zone: UTC−3 (BRT)
- Postal code: 58305-000
- Area code: +55 83

Bayeux is a municipality in the state of Paraíba in the Northeast Region of Brazil.

Presidente Castro Pinto International Airport which serves the state capital (João Pessoa) is located at Bayeux.

The municipality was called Barreiros until 1944, when the name was changed to celebrate the first city of the Battle of Normandy to be liberated, Bayeux, France, during the Second World War.

== See also ==
- List of municipalities in Paraíba
