= Vinícius (footballer, born 1973) =

Brazilian footballer

Personal information
- Full name: Vinícius de Abreu
- Date of birth: 20 December 1973 (age 52)
- Place of birth: Rio de Janeiro, Brazil
- Position: Forward

Senior career*
Years	Team	Apps	(Gls)
1995	XV de Jaú		
1996	Portuguesa-RJ		
1996	Palmeiras	6	(0)
1997	Juventude		
1997	Criciúma		
1998	Friburguense		
1998	Flamengo	14	(4)
1999	Bahia		
1999	Fluminense	8	(0)
2000	Fortaleza		
2000	Portuguesa		
2001	Coritiba		
2001	Fortaleza		
2002	Varzim		
2002–2003	Fortaleza		
2004	Vitória de Guimarães		
2004	Al Jazira		
2004	Paysandu		
2005	Sport Recife		
2006–2007	Ceará	56	(28)
2008	ABC		
2008	Paraná		
- * Club domestic league appearances and goals as of 30 November 2023

Vinícius de Abreu (born 20 December 1973), simply known as Vinícius, is a Brazilian former professional footballer who played as a forward.

== Career ==
Originally from Rio de Janeiro, Vinícius played for several clubs throughout Brazil. Played for Palmeiras in 1996, in 1998 he formed an attacking partnership with Romário at Flamengo. In 1999 he was part of the champion squad with Fluminense in Série C. He arrived at Fortaleza in 2000, where he was two-time state champion, and top scorer in Série B in 2002. He played for clubs in Portugal and for Al Jazira SC. He returned to Ceará football in 2004, this time to Ceará, becoming champion again.

Since 2019, he has worked in the youth categories of Ferroviário AC.

== Honours ==
Fluminense

- Campeonato Brasileiro Série C: 1999

Fortaleza

- Campeonato Cearense: 2000, 2001

Ceará

- Campeonato Cearense: 2006

ABC

- Campeonato Potiguar: 2008
