= Wellington (footballer, born September 1982) =

Brazilian footballer

Personal information
- Full name: Wellington da Silva Serezuella
- Date of birth: September 13, 1982 (age 44)
- Place of birth: Cambé, Paraná, Brazil
- Height: 1.78 m (5 ft 10 in)
- Position: Midfielder

Team information
- Current team: Paraná

Youth career
- 2000–2001: PSTC-PR

Senior career*
Years	Team	Apps	(Gls)
2002–2003	Atlético-PR	2	(0)
2002	→ Grêmio Maringá (Loan)		
2003	Rio Branco-SP		
2004–2005	Ferroviária		
2006	→ Sport (Loan)		
2007–2010	Atlético-PR		
2007	→ Fortaleza (Loan)	7	(0)
2007	→ ABC (Loan)		
2008	→ Ferroviária (Loan)		
2009	→ Criciúma (Loan)	3	(0)
2010	América-SP		
2011	Arapongas		
2011	Paraná	16	(2)
2012	Bragantino		
2012–	Paraná		
- * Club domestic league appearances and goals

Wellington da Silva Serezuella (born September 13, 1982), or simply Wellington, is a Brazilian professional footballer who plays as a midfielder for Paraná Clube.

== Career ==
Wellington made his professional debut for Atlético-PR in the Campeonato Paranaense away to Francisco Beltrão on February 2, 2003 in a 2–0 defeat.
