= Adriano Magrão =

Brazilian footballer (born 1981)

Personal information
- Full name: Adriano Bizerra Melo
- Date of birth: 7 March 1981 (age 45)
- Place of birth: Goiânia, Brazil
- Height: 1.84 m (6 ft 0 in)
- Position: Forward

Youth career
- 2000–2002: Vila Nova

Senior career*
Years	Team	Apps	(Gls)
2002–2003	Iraty		
2004	→ Busan I'Cons (loan)	13	(2)
2005	→ Gama (loan)		
2005	→ Anapolina (loan)	16	(8)
2005–2006	Fluminense	23	(7)
2006	→ Sport (loan)	23	(10)
2007	Fluminense	23	(7)
2008	Atlético Goianiense		
2008	Gama		
2008	→ Bursaspor(loan)	7	(0)
2009	→ Náutico (loan)	2	(0)
2010	América de Natal	3	(0)
2011	Madureira		
2011	Anápolis		
2012	Bonsucesso		
2012	Paysandu		
- * Club domestic league appearances and goals

Adriano Bizerra Melo (born 7 March 1981), better known as Adriano Magrão, is a Brazilian former professional footballer who played as a forward.

He signed a one-and-a-half-year contract with Fluminense in June 2006. He then played for Atlético Goianiense before signed a three-year contract with Sociedade Esportiva do Gama in May 2008. But in June 2008 he signed a two-year deal for Bursaspor. However, he was released in January 2009. After he signed a one-year deal for Náutico in Brazilian Série A. In January 2010, he completed the transfer to América de Natal from Gama.

== Honours ==
Sport

- Série B runner-up: 2006

Fluminense

- Copa do Brasil: 2007
