= Ricardo Lopes (footballer, born 1977) =

Brazilian footballer (born 1977)

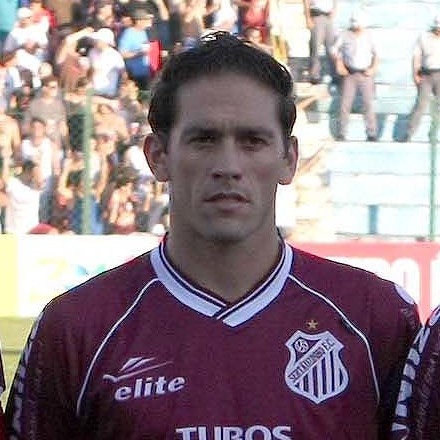

Personal information
- Full name: Nelson Ricardo Lopes
- Date of birth: 18 March 1977 (age 49)
- Place of birth: Jaú, Brazil
- Height: 1.82 m (6 ft 0 in)
- Positions: Right back; right midfielder

Youth career
- XV de Jaú

Senior career*
Years	Team	Apps	(Gls)
1995–1996	XV de Jaú		
1996–2003	Portuguesa	139	(5)
2004–2006	Ituano		
2005	→ Flamengo (loan)		
2005	→ São Caetano (loan)		
2007–2008	Sertãozinho		
2007	→ Paulista (loan)		
2008	Internacional		
2009–2010	Sertãozinho		
2011	União São João		
2012	Rio Branco-SP		
2013	XV de Jaú		
2014	Inter de Bebedouro		
- * Club domestic league appearances and goals as of 1 February 2024

Nelson Ricardo Lopes (born 18 March 1977), better known as Ricardo Lopes, is a Brazilian former professional footballer who played as a right back and right midfielder.

== Career ==
Marked by his versatility, Ricardo Lopes played for Portuguesa de Desportos from 1996 to 2003, making 139 appearances and scoring 5 goals for the club. He had a brief spell at Flamengo in 2005, playing in just 11 games and scoring one goal. Lopes was also part of the winning squad of the 2008 Copa Sudamericana in the centenary of SC Internacional. He ended his career in 2014, at Inter de Bebedouro.

== Honours ==
Internacional

- Copa Sudamericana: 2008
