= Dão (footballer) =

Brazilian footballer (born 1984)

Personal information
- Full name: Dannyu Francisco dos Santos
- Date of birth: 28 October 1984 (age 42)
- Place of birth: Penedo, Brazil
- Height: 1.87 m (6 ft 2 in)
- Position: Centre-back

Team information
- Current team: Barra

Senior career*
Years	Team	Apps	(Gls)
2006–2007	Recife		
2008	CRB		
2009	Mirassol		
2009–2010	Guarani	22	(0)
2010	Spartak Trnava	0	(0)
2011	Botafogo SP	0	(0)
2011–2012	Red Bull Brasil	0	(0)
2012	Luverdense	16	(2)
2013	Chapecoense	22	(1)
2014–2015	Vitória	4	(0)
2015–2016	Paysandu	5	(0)
2016	Piracicaba	0	(0)
2016	Ríver	7	(0)
2017	Cruzeiro	0	(0)
2017	América RN	7	(0)
2018	URT	0	(0)
2018	Noroeste	0	(0)
2019	Pelotas	0	(0)
2019–	Barra		
- * Club domestic league appearances and goals as of 14 March 2018

Dannyu Francisco dos Santos (born 28 October 1984), commonly known as Dão, is a Brazilian professional footballer who plays as a centre-back for Barra Futebol Clube.

== Career ==
Dão began his professional career with Recife, before making moves to CRB and Mirassol. In 2009, he joined Guarani where he made 22 appearances before leaving Brazil for the first time to join Slovak club Spartak Trnava in summer 2010. He returned to his homeland a year later, without having played for Trnava, to sign with Botafogo. He failed to register an appearance for Botafogo before signing with Red Bull Brasil, he again did not make an appearance.

In 2012, he moved to Luverdense where he played 16 times and scored twice during a one-season stay in Lucas do Rio Verde. After a relatively successful period with Luverdense, Dão was on the move again as he joined Chapecoense, he played in 22 Chapecoense matches and scored one goal. Between 2014 and 2015, Dão completed transfers firstly to Vitória and secondly to Paysandu, overall he made nine appearances for the two aforementioned clubs before signing for Piracicaba at the beginning of 2016. His spell with Piracicaba was short as he left on 12 April.

== Honours ==
Recife

- Campeonato Pernambucano: 2006, 2007

Luverdense

- Campeonato Mato-Grossense: 2012
