= Gláuber (footballer, born 1981) =

Brazilian footballer

Personal information
- Full name: Gláuber Vian Corrêa
- Date of birth: 9 February 1981 (age 45)
- Place of birth: Ilha Solteira, Brazil
- Height: 1.83 m (6 ft 0 in)
- Position: Defender

Senior career*
Years	Team	Apps	(Gls)
2000	União Barbarense		
2000–2002	Guarani	23	(0)
2002–2003	Akratitos	17	(0)
2003–2004	Guarani	15	(0)
2005	Sport		
2005	Pogoń Szczecin	0	(0)
2006	Fortaleza	20	(0)
2007	Juventus		
2008	Ituano		
2008	América-SP		
2009	União Barbarense		
2009–2010	Botafogo-DF		
2010–2013	XV de Piracicaba		
2012–2013	→ Mogi Mirim (loan)	5	(0)
2013	→ Treze (loan)	9	(1)
2014–2015	Galícia		
2015	XV de Piracicaba		
2015–2017	Caxias	2	(0)
2017–2019	Velo Clube		
2019	Bangu		
- * Club domestic league appearances and goals

Gláuber Vian Corrêa (born 9 February 1981), also known as Gláuber, is a Brazilian former professional footballer who played as a defender.

== Club career ==
Gláuber previously played for Guarani and Fortaleza in the Campeonato Brasileiro Série A. He played with Akratitos for one season in the Super League Greece. He also had a brief spell with Pogoń Szczecin, but did not appear in any league matches.
