= Brasília (footballer) =

Brazilian footballer (born 1977)

Personal information
- Full name: Cristiano Pereira de Souza
- Date of birth: 28 July 1977 (age 49)
- Place of birth: Brasília, DF, Brazil
- Height: 1.70 m (5 ft 7 in)
- Position: Forward

Senior career*
Years	Team	Apps	(Gls)
1999	Ituano		
1999–2000	Wisła Kraków	23	(2)
2000–2001	Pogoń Szczecin	26	(6)
2001–2002	Energie Cottbus	19	(1)
2003	Zagłębie Lubin	15	(3)
2003	Wisła Kraków	12	(2)
2004	Belenenses	16	(2)
2005	Sport		
2005–2006	Leixões	29	(10)
2006–2007	Vitória SC	29	(7)
2007	Daejeon Citizen	13	(3)
2008	Ulsan Hyundai	19	(3)
2009	Pohang Steelers	6	(0)
2009	Jeonbuk Hyundai Motors	15	(6)
2010	Odra Wodzisław	13	(1)
2010	Olympiakos Nicosia	8	(0)
2011	Uberaba		
2011	Santo André	7	(1)
2011	Boa	0	(0)
2012	Uberlândia		
2012	São Bento		
2013	CRB		
2013	São Bento		
2016	Atlético Sorocaba		
- * Club domestic league appearances and goals

Cristiano Pereira de Souza (born 28 July 1977), also known as Brasília, is a Brazilian former professional footballer who played as a forward. His previous clubs include Odra Wodzisław Śląski, Wisła Kraków, Pogoń Szczecin, Zagłębie Lubin in Poland, Belenenses, Leixões, Vitória SC in Portugal, Energie Cottbus in Germany and Olympiakos Nicosia in Cyprus.

In the 2008 season, he moved to Ulsan Hyundai Horang-i.

In 2008, he won South Korea's K-League and was top assistor with six assists. He joined Pohang Steelers in January 2009.

In January 2010, he joined Ekstraklasa club Odra Wodzislaw.

== Honours ==
Wisła Kraków

- Ekstraklasa: 2003–04

Jeonbuk Hyundai Motors

- K League: 2009
