= Ramalho (footballer, born 1978) =

Brazilian footballer

Personal information
- Full name: Edson Ramalho dos Santos
- Date of birth: March 15, 1978 (age 48)
- Place of birth: Santa Cruz do Monte Castelo, Brazil
- Height: 1.81 m (5 ft 11 in)
- Position: Midfielder

Youth career
- Corinthians

Senior career*
Years	Team	Apps	(Gls)
1996–1998	Corinthians		
2001–2003	Bahia		
2003–2004	São Caetano		
2004	São Paulo		
2004–2005	Sport Recife		
2005–2006	Juventude		
2006–2007	Fortaleza		
2009–2010	Paulista		
2011	Juventus		
2011	Comercial-MS		
2012	Santa Cruz		
- * Club domestic league appearances and goals

Edson Ramalho dos Santos (born March 15, 1978), or simply Ramalho, is a Brazilian former professional footballer who played as a midfielder.
