= Bruno Recife =

Brazilian footballer (born 1982)

Personal information
- Full name: Bruno Leonardo Barbosa
- Date of birth: March 2, 1982 (age 44)
- Place of birth: Surubim-PE, Brazil
- Height: 1.81 m (5 ft 11 in)
- Position: Left back

Team information
- Current team: Mirassol

Youth career
- 2001–2002: Surubim-PE

Senior career*
Years	Team	Apps	(Gls)
2003–2006	Bahia		
2005	→ Ponte Preta (Loan)		
2006	→ Sport (Loan)		
2007–2008	Sport		
2008–2009	Portuguesa		
2009	→ São Caetano (loan)	25	(0)
2010–2011	São Caetano	27	(1)
2012–2013	Guarani		
2013–	Mirassol		
- * Club domestic league appearances and goals

Bruno Leonardo Barbosa (born March 2, 1982), known as Bruno Recife or simply Bruno, is a Brazilian football left back. He currently plays for Mirassol.

== Honours ==
- Pernambuco State League: 2006, 2007

== Contract ==
- 2 January 2007 to 31 December 2009
