= Marcos Tamandaré =

Brazilian footballer

Personal information
- Full name: Marcos Roberto Nascimento da Silva
- Date of birth: 20 March 1981 (age 45)
- Place of birth: Barreiros, Brazil
- Height: 1.77 m (5 ft 10 in)
- Position: Right back

Team information
- Current team: Salgueiro (head coach)

Senior career*
Years	Team	Apps	(Gls)
1999–2003	Ypiranga-PE		
2004	Porto-PE		
2005–2006	Sport Recife	39	(2)
2007	Corinthians	5	(0)
2007	Rapid Bucharest	7	(0)
2008	Coritiba	15	(1)
2009	Fortaleza	4	(0)
2010	Rio Branco-SP	0	(0)
2010	ASA	20	(2)
2011	Macaé	0	(0)
2011–2018	Salgueiro	98	(3)
Total		188	(8)

Managerial career
- 2019: Salgueiro U20
- 2019–2021: Salgueiro (assistant)
- 2021: América de Natal (assistant)
- 2022: Salgueiro (assistant)
- 2023–: Salgueiro
- * Club domestic league appearances and goals

Marcos Roberto Nascimento da Silva (born 20 March 1981 in Barreiros, Pernambuco, Brazil), usually known as Marcos Tamandaré, is a Brazilian football coach and former player who played as a right back. He is the current head coach of Salgueiro.
