= Leo Oliveira =

Brazilian footballer

Personal information
- Full name: Leonardo Lins de Oliveira
- Date of birth: 28 May 1980 (age 46)
- Place of birth: João Pessoa, Brazil
- Height: 1.83 m (6 ft 0 in)
- Position: Defender

Team information
- Current team: Ipatinga

Senior career*
Years	Team	Apps	(Gls)
2000	Democrata		
2001–2002	Ipatinga		
2002	Atlético Mineiro		
2002–2003	Caxias		
2003	Cruzeiro		
2003	Criciúma	23	(3)
2004	Santa Cruz		
2004	Guaratinguetá		
2005–2006	Sport		
2007–	Ipatinga	19	(0)
- * Club domestic league appearances and goals as of 7 January 2009

Leonardo Lins de Oliveira or simply Leo Oliveira (born 28 May 1980) is a Brazilian defender who plays for Ipatinga.

== See also ==
- Football in Brazil
