= Jadílson (footballer, born 1980) =

Brazilian footballer

Personal information
- Full name: Jadílson Carlos da Silva
- Date of birth: October 14, 1980 (age 46)
- Place of birth: Recife, Brazil
- Height: 1.76 m (5 ft 9 in)
- Position: Striker

Youth career
- 2000–2001: Unibol-PE

Senior career*
Years	Team	Apps	(Gls)
2002–2003	Atlético-PR	10	(3)
2004	→ Baniyas (UAE) (loan)		
2005–2006	→ Sport (loan)		
2007–	Sport		
- * Club domestic league appearances and goals

Jadílson Carlos da Silva (born October 14, 1980), or simply Jadílson, is a Brazilian former professional footballer who played as a striker.
