= 2016 Clube Náutico Capibaribe season =

Náutico
2016 season
- Chairman: Marcos Freitas
- Manager: Gilmar Dal Pozzo; Alexandre Gallo; Givanildo Oliveira
- Stadium: Arena Pernambuco
- Série B: 5th
- Pernambucano: Semi-finals
- Copa do Brasil: First stage
- Top goalscorer: League: Rony (11); All: Rony (14)
Home colours	Away colours	Third colours

The 2016 season was Náutico's 116th season in the club's history. Náutico competed in the Campeonato Pernambucano, Copa do Brasil and Série B.

== Final squad ==
Note: Flags indicate national team as defined under FIFA eligibility rules; some limited exceptions apply. Players may hold more than one non-FIFA nationality.

No.	Pos.	Nation	Player
1	GK	BRA	Júlio César
2	DF	BRA	Joazi
4	DF	BRA	Léo Pereira
6	DF	BRA	Mateus Muller
7	FW	BRA	Rony
8	MF	BRA	Rodrigo Souza
9	FW	BRA	Yuri Mamute
10	MF	BRA	Hugo
11	FW	BRA	Bergson
12	GK	BRA	Rodolpho
13	MF	BRA	João Ananias
16	DF	BRA	Igor Rabello
17	MF	BRA	Niel
18	MF	BRA	Maylson
19	DF	URU	Gastón Filgueira
22	DF	BRA	Walber
20	MF	BRA	Esquerdinha
23	MF	BRA	Renan Oliveira

No.	Pos.	Nation	Player
25	FW	BRA	Danrlei
29	MF	BRA	Vina
30	DF	BRA	Rafael Ribeiro
32	GK	BRA	Jefferson
33	DF	BRA	Rafael Pereira
41	DF	BRA	Adalberto
49	MF	BRA	Eurico
62	FW	BRA	Rogérinho
66	FW	BRA	Odilávio
69	FW	BRA	Jefferson Nem
79	FW	BRA	Léo Santos
85	MF	BRA	Negretti
90	FW	BRA	Daniel Morais
92	MF	BRA	Gustavo Henrique
95	DF	BRA	Hayner
96	MF	BRA	Cal
99	FW	BRA	Tiago Adan

== Statistics ==
=== Overall ===
Games played	54 (14 Pernambucano, 2 Copa do Brasil, 38 Série B)
Games won	27 (9 Pernambucano, 0 Copa do Brasil, 18 Série B)
Games drawn	10 (2 Pernambucano, 2 Copa do Brasil, 6 Série B)
Games lost	17 (3 Pernambucano, 0 Copa do Brasil, 14 Série B)
Goals scored	80
Goals conceded	53
Goal difference	+27
Best results (goal difference)	5–0 (H) v América–PE - Pernambucano - 2016.03.14; 5–0 (H) v Sampaio Corrêa - Série B - 2016.05.27
Worst result (goal difference)	0–3 (A) v Atlético Goianiense - Série B - 2016.07.02; 0–3 (A) v Avaí - Série B - 2016.11.12
Top scorer	Rony (14)

Source: Náutico official website

=== Goalscorers ===
Place	Position	Nationality	Number	Name	Campeonato Pernambucano	Copa do Brasil	Série B	Total
1	FW	(Brazil)	7	Rony	3	0	11	14
2	FW	(Brazil)	11	Bergson	2	0	7	9
3	FW	(Brazil)	69	Jefferson Nem	1	0	7	8
4	DF	(Brazil)	3	Ronaldo Alves	6	0	0	6
5	MF	(Brazil)	29	Vina	0	0	5	5
6	FW	(Brazil)	90	Daniel Morais	4	0	0	4
6	MF	(Brazil)	23	Renan Oliveira	1	0	3	4
7	DF	(Brazil)	33	Rafael Pereira	0	0	3	3
8	MF	(Brazil)	20	Esquerdinha	1	1	0	2
8	MF	(Brazil)	10	Hugo	0	0	2	2
8	DF	(Brazil)	16	Igor Rabello	0	0	2	2
8	MF	(Brazil)	18	Maylson	0	0	2	2
8	FW	(Brazil)	9	Rafael Coelho	1	0	1	2
8	MF	(Brazil)	8	Rodrigo Souza	0	0	2	2
8	MF	(Brazil)	37	Taiberson	0	0	2	2
8	FW	(Brazil)	9	Thiago Santana	2	0	0	2
9	MF	(Brazil)	11	Caique Valdivia	1	0	0	1
9	DF	(Brazil)	38	Eduardo Bauermann	0	0	1	1
9	DF	(Uruguay)	16	Gastón Filgueira	0	0	1	1
9	DF	(Brazil)	2	Joazi	1	0	0	1
9	FW	(Brazil)	79	Léo Santos	0	0	1	1
9	MF	(Brazil)	10	Marco Antônio	0	0	1	1
9	DF	(Brazil)	6	Mateus Müller	0	0	1	1
9	FW	(Brazil)	99	Tiago Adan	0	0	1	1
				Own goals	1	0	2	3
				Total	24	1	55	80

=== Home record ===
São Lourenço da Mata	Recife
Arena Pernambuco	Estádio do Arruda
Capacity: 44,300	Capacity: 55,582
25 matches (17 wins 3 draws 5 losses)	2 matches (1 win 1 draw)

== Official Competitions ==
=== Campeonato Pernambucano ===
==== First stage ====
1 February 2016 1	Náutico	2–0	Santa Cruz	São Lourenço da Mata
(UTC-3)	Ronaldo Alves 48' (pen.); Bergson 87'	Report		Stadium: Estádio Governador Carlos Wilson Campos (Arena Pernambuco); Attendance: 9,296; Referee: Emerson Sobral

4 February 2016 2	Central	0–2	Náutico	Caruaru
(UTC-3)		Report	Bergson 72'; Thiago Santana 89'	Stadium: Estádio Luiz José de Lacerda (Lacerdão); Attendance: 5,086; Referee: Tiago Nascimento dos Santos

10 February 2016 3	Náutico	1–0	Salgueiro	São Lourenço da Mata
(UTC-3)	Daniel Morais 34'	Report		Stadium: Estádio Governador Carlos Wilson Campos (Arena Pernambuco); Attendance: 2,893; Referee: Sabastião Rufino Filho

22 February 2016 4	América–PE	0–1	Náutico	Recife
(UTC-3)		Report	Ronaldo Alves 49'	Stadium: Estádio Adelmar da Costa Carvalho (Ilha do Retiro); Attendance: 2,626; Referee: Ricardo Jorge Ribeiro dos Anjos

28 February 2016 5	Sport	2–0	Náutico	Recife
(UTC-3)	Lenis 35'; Fábio Matos 74'	Report		Stadium: Estádio Adelmar da Costa Carvalho (Ilha do Retiro); Attendance: 14,504; Referee: Tiago Nascimento dos Santos

6 March 2016 6	Náutico	1–1	Sport	São Lourenço da Mata
(UTC-3)	Ronaldo Alves 55' (pen.)	Report	Niel 60' (o.g.)	Stadium: Estádio Governador Carlos Wilson Campos (Arena Pernambuco); Attendance: 7,041; Referee: José Woshington da Silva

14 March 2016 7	Náutico	5–0	América–PE	Recife
(UTC-3)	Renan Oliveira 1'; Danilo 10' (o.g.); Rony 35'; Caique Valdivia 62'; Ronaldo Alves 90'	Report		Stadium: Estádio José do Rego Maciel (Arruda); Attendance: 2,830; Referee: Diego Fernando Silva de Lima

20 March 2016 8	Santa Cruz	1–1	Náutico	Recife
(UTC-3)	Rafael Alemão 45'	Report	Daniel Morais 68'	Stadium: Estádio José do Rego Maciel (Arruda); Attendance: 12,010; Referee: Gilberto Castro Júnior

3 April 2016 9	Náutico	3–0	Central	São Lourenço da Mata
(UTC-3)	Daniel Morais 50', 87'; Ronaldo Alves 83'	Report		Stadium: Estádio Governador Carlos Wilson Campos (Arena Pernambuco); Attendance: 4,013; Referee: Deborah Cecília Cruz Correia

10 April 2016 10	Salgueiro	0–2	Náutico	Salgueiro
(UTC-3)		Report	Thiago Santana 22'; Esquerdinha 90'	Stadium: Estádio Cornélio de Barros; Attendance: 6,011; Referee: Emerson Luiz Sobral

==== Semi-finals ====
20 April 2016	Santa Cruz	3–1	Náutico	Recife
(UTC-3)	Arthur Caíke 9', 53'; Tiago Costa 69'	Report	Joazi 87'	Stadium: Estádio José do Rego Maciel (Arruda); Attendance: 40,140; Referee: Sebastião Rufino Filho

24 April 2016	Náutico	1–2	Santa Cruz	São Lourenço da Mata
(UTC-3)	Ronaldo Alves 32'	Report	Grafite 52'; Lelê 90+2'	Stadium: Estádio Governador Carlos Wilson Campos (Arena Pernambuco); Attendance: 15,596; Referee: Emerson Luiz Sobral

==== Match for Third Place ====
4 May 2016	Salgueiro	0–1	Náutico	Salgueiro
(UTC-3)		Report	Rony 50'	Stadium: Estádio Cornélio de Barros

7 May 2016	Náutico	3–0	Salgueiro	São Lourenço da Mata
(UTC-3)	Rafael Coelho 15'; Rony 54'; Jefferson Nem 82'	Report		Stadium: Estádio Governador Carlos Wilson Campos (Arena Pernambuco); Attendance: 1,827; Referee: Gilberto Rodrigues Castro Junior

==== Record ====
Final Position	Points	Matches	Wins	Draws	Losses	Goals For	Goals Away	Avg%
3rd	29	14	9	2	3	24	9	69%

=== Copa do Brasil ===
==== Matches ====
17 March 2016	Vitória da Conquista	0–0	Náutico	Vitória da Conquista
19:15 (UTC-3)		Report		Stadium: Estádio Lomanto Júnior; Attendance: 3,507; Referee: Claudionor dos Santos Júnior

7 April 2016	Náutico	1–1	Vitória da Conquista	São Lourenço da Mata
19:30 (UTC-3)	Esquerdinha 61'	Report	Zé Paulo 23'	Stadium: Estádio Governador Carlos Wilson Campos (Arena Pernambuco); Attendance: 1,773; Referee: Andrey da Silva e Silva

==== Record ====
Final Position	Points	Matches	Wins	Draws	Losses	Goals For	Goals Away	Avg%
57th	2	2	0	2	0	1	1	33%

=== Série B ===
==== First stage ====
14 May 2016 1	Criciúma	1–0	Náutico	Criciúma
16:30 (UTC-3)	Gustavo 51'	Report		Stadium: Estádio Heriberto Hülse; Attendance: 3,702; Referee: José Cláudio Rocha Filho

17 May 2016 2	Náutico	3–2	Vila Nova	São Lourenço da Mata
21:30 (UTC-3)	Mateus Müller 18'; Rafael Pereira 45+1'; Jefferson Nem 48'	Report	Roger 13'; Vandinho 50'	Stadium: Estádio Governador Carlos Wilson Campos (Arena Pernambuco); Attendance: 1,514; Referee: Luiz César de Oliveira Magalhães

24 May 2016 3	Londrina	1–0	Náutico	Londrina
19:15 (UTC-3)	Keirrison 69'	Report		Stadium: Estádio Jacy Scaff (do Café); Attendance: 1,950; Referee: Felipe Duarte Varejão

27 May 2016 4	Náutico	5–0	Sampaio Corrêa	São Lourenço da Mata
21:30 (UTC-3)	Bergson 20'; Jefferson Nem 23'; Rony 47'; Rafael Coelho 56'; Rodrigo Souza 64'	Report		Stadium: Estádio Governador Carlos Wilson Campos (Arena Pernambuco); Attendance: 1,546; Referee: Francisco de Paula dos Santos Silva Neto

31 May 2016 5	Bahia	0–0	Náutico	Salvador
19:15 (UTC-3)		Report		Stadium: Itaipava Arena Fonte Nova; Attendance: 8,662; Referee: João Batista de Arruda

3 June 2016 6	Náutico	2–0	Joinville	São Lourenço da Mata
21:30 (UTC-3)	Renan Oliveira 22'; Tiago Adan 87'	Report		Stadium: Estádio Governador Carlos Wilson Campos (Arena Pernambuco); Attendance: 1,671; Referee: Francisco Carlos do Nascimento

7 June 2016 7	Paysandu	1–3	Náutico	Belém
19:15 (UTC-3)	Lucas Siqueira 1'	Report	Maylson 25'; Jefferson Nem 46', 68'	Stadium: Estádio Leônidas Sodré de Castro (Curuzu); Attendance: 4,065; Referee: Leandro Pedro Vuaden

11 June 2016 8	Náutico	5–1	Paraná	São Lourenço da Mata
16:00 (UTC-3)	Renan Oliveira 7'; Bergson 29'; Jefferson Nem 49'; Taiberson 66', 75'	Report	Henrique 87'	Stadium: Estádio Governador Carlos Wilson Campos (Arena Pernambuco); Attendance: 9,289; Referee: Flávio Rodrigues de Souza

14 June 2016 9	Vasco da Gama	3–2	Náutico	Rio de Janeiro
19:15 (UTC-3)	Andrezinho 12'; Rodrigo 46'; Éder Luís 77'	Report	Rafael Pereira 33'; Renan Oliveira 90+2'	Stadium: Estádio Vasco da Gama (São Januário); Attendance: 3,483; Referee: Jean Pierre Goncalves Lima

18 June 2016 10	Náutico	1–1	Bragantino	Recife
16:00 (UTC-3)	Bergson 90+2'	Report	Watson 57'	Stadium: Estádio José do Rego Maciel (Arruda); Attendance: 7,236; Referee: Emerson de Almeida Ferreira

21 June 2016 11	Brasil de Pelotas	0–0	Náutico	Caxias do Sul
21:30 (UTC-3)		Report		Stadium: stádio Francisco Stédile (Centenário); Attendance: 298; Referee: Alinor Silva da Paixão

25 June 2016 12	Ceará	2–1	Náutico	Fortaleza
16:30 (UTC-3)	Eduardo Diniz 30'; Bill 40'	Report	Rony 49'	Stadium: Estádio Governador Plácido Castelo (Castelão); Attendance: 15,594; Referee: Claudio Francisco Lima e Silva

28 June 2016 13	Náutico	1–0	Luverdense	São Lourenço da Mata
20:30 (UTC-3)	Walace 39' (o.g.)	Report		Stadium: Estádio Governador Carlos Wilson Campos (Arena Pernambuco); Attendance: 3,274; Referee: Alisson Sidnei Furtado

2 July 2016 14	Atlético Goianiense	3–0	Náutico	Goiânia
16:00 (UTC-3)	Gilsinho 24'; Alison 32'; Magno Cruz 70'	Report		Stadium: Estádio do Governo do Estado de Goiás (Serra Dourada); Attendance: 2,223; Referee: Grazianni Maciel Rocha

9 July 2016 15	Náutico	1–3	CRB	São Lourenço da Mata
16:00 (UTC-3)	Rony 39'	Report	Gérson Magrão 29'; Matheus Galdezani 71'; Roger Gaúcho 90'	Stadium: Estádio Governador Carlos Wilson Campos (Arena Pernambuco); Attendance: 8,323; Referee: Leandro Pedro Vuaden

16 July 2016 16	Goiás	4–2	Náutico	Goiânia
16:30 (UTC-3)	Carlos Eduardo 38'; Léo Lima 54'; Rossi 63', 71'	Report	Hugo 5'; Rony 44'	Stadium: Estádio do Governo do Estado de Goiás (Serra Dourada); Attendance: 3,968; Referee: Rafael Traci

22 July 2016 17	Náutico	3–1	Avaí	São Lourenço da Mata
21:30 (UTC-3)	Rony 1'; Eduardo Bauermann 45'; Jefferson Nem 63'	Report	Lucas Coelho 88'	Stadium: Estádio Governador Carlos Wilson Campos (Arena Pernambuco); Attendance: 2,147; Referee: Raphael Claus

29 July 2016 18	Náutico	1–0	Tupi	São Lourenço da Mata
21:30 (UTC-3)	Filgueira 50'	Report		Stadium: Estádio Governador Carlos Wilson Campos (Arena Pernambuco); Attendance: 3,067; Referee: Jailson Macedo Freitas

2 August 2016 19	Oeste	0–0	Náutico	Barueri
21:30 (UTC-3)		Report		Stadium: Arena Barueri; Attendance: 1,481; Referee: Adriano Milczvski

20 August 2016 20	Náutico	0–1	Criciúma	São Lourenço da Mata
16:00 (UTC-3)		Report	Alex Maranhão 27'	Stadium: Estádio Governador Carlos Wilson Campos (Arena Pernambuco); Attendance: 3,024; Referee: Jailson Macedo Freitas

27 August 2016 21	Vila Nova	0–2	Náutico	Goiânia
16:20 (UTC-3)		Report	Jefferson Nem 51'; Hugo 55'	Stadium: Estádio Onésio Brasileiro Alvarenga; Attendance: 4,433; Referee: Paulo Sérgio Santos Moreira

30 August 2016 22	Náutico	0–2	Londrina	São Lourenço da Mata
20:30 (UTC-3)		Report	Germano 36'; Keirrison 60'	Stadium: Estádio Governador Carlos Wilson Campos (Arena Pernambuco); Attendance: 3,117; Referee: Devarly Lira do Rosário

3 September 2016 23	Sampaio Corrêa	4–3	Náutico	São Luís
21:00 (UTC-3)	Pimentinha 36', 76'; Elias 71', 74'	Report	Vina 16', 47'; Igor Rabello 82'	Stadium: Estádio Governador João Castelo (Castelão); Attendance: 1,828; Referee: Caio Max Augusto Vieira

10 September 2016 24	Náutico	0–0	Bahia	São Lourenço da Mata
16:30 (UTC-3)		Report		Stadium: Estádio Governador Carlos Wilson Campos (Arena Pernambuco); Attendance: 4,859; Referee: Elmo Alves Resende Cunha

13 September 2016 25	Joinville	0–0	Náutico	Joinville
19:15 (UTC-3)		Report		Stadium: Arena Joinville; Attendance: 6,509; Referee: Igor Junio Benevenuto

17 September 2016 26	Náutico	3–1	Paysandu	São Lourenço da Mata
16:30 (UTC-3)	Vina 16', 21', 90+4'	Report	Jhonnatan 42'	Stadium: Estádio Governador Carlos Wilson Campos (Arena Pernambuco); Attendance: 2,635; Referee: Gleidson Santos Oliveira

24 September 2016 27	Paraná	1–2	Náutico	Curitiba
16:20 (UTC-3)	Fernando Karanga 63'	Report	Rodrigo Souza 26'; Rony 46'	Stadium: Estádio Durival Britto e Silva (Vila Capanema); Attendance: 2,119; Referee: Claudio Francisco Lima e Silva

1 October 2016 28	Náutico	3–1	Vasco da Gama	São Lourenço da Mata
16:30 (UTC-3)	Rony 24', 90+2'; Bergson 46'	Report	Madson 83'	Stadium: Estádio Governador Carlos Wilson Campos (Arena Pernambuco); Attendance: 14,648; Referee: Thiago Duarte Peixoto

4 October 2016 29	Bragantino	0–1	Náutico	Bragança Paulista
19:15 (UTC-3)		Report	Marco Antônio 84'	Stadium: Estádio Nabi Abi Chedid; Attendance: 481; Referee: Felipe Duarte Varejão

7 October 2016 30	Náutico	2–0	Brasil de Pelotas	São Lourenço da Mata
21:00 (UTC-3)	Bergson 44'; Marcão 82' (o.g.)	Report		Stadium: Estádio Governador Carlos Wilson Campos (Arena Pernambuco); Attendance: 11,239; Referee: Edmar Campos Encarnação

15 October 2016 31	Náutico	1–0	Ceará	São Lourenço da Mata
18:30 (UTC-3)	Igor Rabello 90+4'	Report		Stadium: Estádio Governador Carlos Wilson Campos (Arena Pernambuco); Attendance: 25,257; Referee: João Batista de Arruda

21 October 2016 32	Luverdense	2–1	Náutico	Lucas do Rio Verde
21:30 (UTC-3)	Alfredo 55', 82'	Report	Bergson 10'	Stadium: Estádio Municipal Passo das Emas; Attendance: 573; Referee: Alisson Sidnei Furtado

28 October 2016 33	Náutico	2–1	Atlético Goianiense	São Lourenço da Mata
21:30 (UTC-3)	Rony 1', 15'	Report	Magno Cruz 90'	Stadium: Estádio Governador Carlos Wilson Campos (Arena Pernambuco); Attendance: 15,319; Referee: Celio Amorim

5 November 2016 34	CRB	1–0	Náutico	Maceió
17:30 (UTC-3)	Matheus Galdezani 80'	Report		Stadium: Estádio Rei Pelé; Attendance: 11,041; Referee: Alinor Silva da Paixão

8 November 2016 35	Náutico	1–0	Goiás	São Lourenço da Mata
21:30 (UTC-3)	Maylson 71'	Report		Stadium: Estádio Governador Carlos Wilson Campos (Arena Pernambuco); Attendance: 8,991; Referee: Alisson Sidnei Furtado

12 November 2016 36	Avaí	3–0	Náutico	Florianópolis
17:30 (UTC-3)	Marquinhos 25', 45+2'; Rômulo 51'	Report		Stadium: Estádio Aderbal Ramos da Silva (Ressacada); Attendance: 13,076; Referee: Diego Almeida Real

19 November 2016 37	Tupi	1–4	Náutico	Juiz de Fora
16:30 (UTC-3)	Giancarlo 56'	Report	Rony 14'; Bergson 43'; Rafael Pereira 75'; Léo Santos 90+3'	Stadium: Estádio Municipal Radialista Mário Helênio; Attendance: 429; Referee: Francisco de Paula dos Santos Silva Neto

26 November 2016 38	Náutico	0–2	Oeste	São Lourenço da Mata
17:30 (UTC-3)		Report	Pedro Carmona 21'; Mike 39'	Stadium: Estádio Governador Carlos Wilson Campos (Arena Pernambuco); Attendance: 25,602; Referee: André Luiz de Freitas Castro

==== Record ====
Final Position	Points	Matches	Wins	Draws	Losses	Goals For	Goals Away	Avg%
5th	60	38	18	6	14	55	43	52%
