= 2022 Santa Cruz Futebol Clube season =

Santa Cruz
2022 season
- Chairman: Joaquim Bezerra
- Manager: Leston Júnior; Marcelo Martelotte
- Stadium: Estádio do Arruda
- Série D: 16th
- Pernambucano: Semi-finals
- Copa do Nordeste: Preliminary round
- Top goalscorer: League: Hugo Cabral (7); All: Hugo Cabral and Rafael Furtado (7)
Home colours	Away colours

The 2022 season was Santa Cruz's 109th season in the club's history. Santa Cruz competed in the Campeonato Pernambucano, Série D and Copa do Nordeste.

== Squad ==
Note: Flags indicate national team as defined under FIFA eligibility rules; some limited exceptions apply. Players may hold more than one non-FIFA nationality.

No.	Pos.	Nation	Player
—	GK	BRA	Geaze
—	GK	BRA	Jaime
—	GK	BRA	Jefferson (on loan from Náutico)
—	GK	BRA	Kléver
—	DF	BRA	Alex Alves
—	DF	BRA	Eduardo Guedes
—	DF	BRA	Ítalo Melo
—	DF	BRA	Júnior Sergipano
—	DF	BRA	Lucão
—	DF	BRA	Dudu Mandai
—	DF	BRA	Edson Ratinho
—	DF	BRA	Italo Silva
—	DF	BRA	Marcos Martins
—	MF	BRA	Elyeser Maciel

No.	Pos.	Nation	Player
—	MF	BRA	Gilberto
—	MF	BRA	João Erick
—	MF	BRA	Matheus Lira
—	MF	BRA	Rodrigo Yuri
—	MF	BRA	Esquerdinha
—	MF	BRA	João Cardoso
—	MF	BRA	João Henrique
—	MF	BRA	Tarcísio
—	FW	BRA	Arian
—	FW	BRA	Mateus Anderson
—	FW	BRA	Matheuzinho
—	FW	BRA	Rafael Furtado
—	FW	BRA	Walter

== Statistics ==
=== Overall ===
Games played	30 (1 Copa do Nordeste, 11 Pernambucano, 18 Série D)
Games won	12 (0 Copa do Nordeste, 6 Pernambucano, 6 Série D)
Games drawn	10 (1 Copa do Nordeste, 3 Pernambucano, 6 Série D)
Games lost	8 (0 Copa do Nordeste, 2 Pernambucano, 6 Série D)
Goals scored	41
Goals conceded	34
Goal difference	+7
Best results (goal difference)	4–1 (A) v Atlético de Alagoinhas – Série D – 2022.06.27
Worst result (goal difference)	0–4 (H) v Retrô – Pernambucano – 2022.02.26
Top scorer	Hugo Cabral and Rafael Furtado (7)

Source: Santa Cruz official website

=== Goalscorers ===
Place	Position	Nationality	Number	Name	Copa do Nordeste	Campeonato Pernambucano	Série D	Total
1	FW	(Brazil)	10	Hugo Cabral	0	0	7	7
1	FW	(Brazil)	9	Rafael Furtado	0	5	2	7
2	FW	(Brazil)	11	Matheuzinho	0	2	3	5
3	MF	(Brazil)	17	Esquerdinha	0	4	0	4
3	MF	(Brazil)	7	Tarcísio	0	4	0	4
4	FW	(Brazil)	18	Walter	0	3	0	3
5	FW	(Brazil)	9	Pipico	2	0	0	2
5	FW	(Brazil)	21	Raphael Macena	0	0	2	2
6	MF	(Brazil)	19	Anderson Ceará	0	0	1	1
6	MF	(Brazil)	21	João Cardoso	0	1	0	1
6	MF	(Brazil)	17	João Henrique	0	1	0	1
6	DF	(Brazil)	4	Rafael Alemão	0	0	1	1
6	MF	(Brazil)	20	Rodrigo Yuri	0	1	0	1
6	MF	(Brazil)	8	Vitinho	1	0	0	1
				Own goals	0	1	0	1
				Total	3	22	16	41

=== Managers performance ===
Name	Nationality	From	To	P	W	D	L	GF	GA	Avg%	Ref
Leston Júnior	Brazil	19 October 2021	8 May 2022	16	7	5	4	29	22	54%	
Marcelo Martelotte	Brazil	15 May 2022	14 August 2022	14	5	5	4	12	12	47%	

== Friendlies ==
=== National ===
30 December 2022	Santa Cruz	2–2	Maguary	Recife
(UTC-3)	Michel Douglas 26'; Dagson 90'	Report	Rafael Peixoto 8'; Luan Henrique 80'	Stadium: Estádio José do Rego Maciel (Arruda); Referee: Leonilson Fernandes Trigueiro Filho

== Official competitions ==
=== Copa do Nordeste ===
==== Preliminary round ====
19 October 2021	Santa Cruz	3–3 (2–4 p)	Floresta	São Lourenço da Mata
21:30 (UTC-3)	Pipico 22', 83'; Vitinho 52'	Report	Paulo Vyctor 33'; Fábio Alves 80'; Maílson Alves 90+1'	Stadium: Estádio Governador Carlos Wilson Campos (Arena Pernambuco); Referee: Leonilson Fernandes Trigueiro Filho
	Penalties
	Pipico (penalty missed); Lelê (penalty scored); Leonan (penalty scored); Breno Calixto (penalty missed)		(penalty scored) Fábio Alves; (penalty scored) Dudu; (penalty scored) Daniel; (penalty scored) Athyrson

==== Record ====
Final Position	Points	Matches	Wins	Draws	Losses	Goals For	Goals Away	Avg%
N/A	1	1	0	1	0	3	3	33%

=== Campeonato Pernambucano ===
==== First stage ====
29 January 2022 2	Caruaru City	1–2	Santa Cruz	Caruaru
16:30 (UTC-3)	Maylson 80'	Report	Rodrigo Yuri 25'; Rafael Furtado 70'	Stadium: Estádio Antônio Inácio de Souza (Vera Cruz); Referee: Luiz Cláudio Sobral

3 February 2022 1*	Santa Cruz	5–2	Afogados da Ingazeira	Recife
20:30 (UTC-3)	Joao Henrique 8'; Matheuzinho 41'; Tarcísio 44', 57'; Walter 45'	Report	Tauã 37'; Lucas Vinícius 55'	Stadium: Estádio José do Rego Maciel (Arruda); Referee: Gilberto Castro Júnior

6 February 2022 3	Santa Cruz	3–0	Íbis	São Lourenço da Mata
16:00 (UTC-3)	Tarcísio 3'; Esquerdinha 52'; Rafael Furtado 90+3'	Report		Stadium: Estádio Governador Carlos Wilson Campos (Arena Pernambuco); Attendance: 855; Referee: José Woshington da Silva

9 February 2022 4	Salgueiro	2–1	Santa Cruz	Salgueiro
20:30 (UTC-3)	Kady 5'; Lucão 18'	Report	Esquerdinha 4'	Stadium: Estádio Cornélio de Barros (Salgueirão); Referee: Rodrigo Pereira

12 February 2022 8*	Sete de Setembro	1–3	Santa Cruz	Afogados da Ingazeira
16:30 (UTC-3)	Anderson São João 20' (pen.)	Report	Walter 12', 40'; Matheuzinho 57'	Stadium: Estádio Valdemar Viana de Araújo (Vianão); Referee: Paulo Belence

19 February 2022 7*	Sport	2–2	Santa Cruz	Recife
16:30 (UTC-3)	Luciano Juba 64'; Rodrigão 90+2'	Report	Tarcísio 71'; Rafael Furtado 89'	Stadium: Estádio Adelmar da Costa Carvalho (Ilha do Retiro); Referee: Deborah Cecilia Cruz Correia

26 February 2022 5	Santa Cruz	0–4	Retrô	Recife
16:30 (UTC-3)		Report	Charles Almeida 20'; Giva 30'; Pedro 45+2'; Rodrigo Fumaça 65'	Stadium: Estádio José do Rego Maciel (Arruda); Referee: Diego Fernando Silva de Lima

5 March 2022 6	Santa Cruz	2–1	Vera Cruz	Recife
16:30 (UTC-3)	Rafael Furtado 90'; João Cardoso 90+4'	Report	João Victor 79'	Stadium: Estádio José do Rego Maciel (Arruda); Referee: Hugo Figueiredo

16 March 2022 9	Santa Cruz	1–1	Náutico	Recife
21:00 (UTC-3)	Matheus Anderson 47' (pen.)	Report	Léo Passos 63'	Stadium: Estádio José do Rego Maciel (Arruda); Referee: Rodrigo Pereira

==== Quarter-final ====
19 March 2022	Santa Cruz	3–0	Caruaru City	Recife
16:30 (UTC-3)	Rafael Furtado 50'; Esquerdinha 73', 90+1'	Report		Stadium: Estádio José do Rego Maciel (Arruda); Attendance: 3,591; Referee: Gilberto Rodrigues Castro Júnior

==== Semi-final ====
2 April 2022	Náutico	0–0 (4–3 p)	Santa Cruz	Recife
16:30 (UTC-3)		Report		Stadium: Estádio Eládio de Barros Carvalho (Aflitos); Attendance: 10,006; Referee: Deborah Cecília Cruz Correia
	Penalties
	Jean Carlos (penalty missed); Diogo Hereda (penalty scored); Diego Victor (penalty scored); Amarildo (penalty scored); Júnior Tavares (penalty scored)		(penalty scored) Esquerdinha; (penalty missed) Alex Alves; (penalty scored) Rodrigo Yuri; (penalty scored) Marcos Martins; (penalty missed) Edson Ratinho

==== Record ====
Final Position	Points	Matches	Wins	Draws	Losses	Goals For	Goals Away	Avg%
3rd	21	11	6	3	2	22	14	63%

=== Série D ===
==== Group stage ====
17 April 2022 1	Lagarto	0–0	Santa Cruz	Lagarto
16:00 (UTC-3)		Report		Stadium: Estádio Paulo Barreto de Menezes; Referee: Gustavo Ervino Bauermann

23 April 2022 2	Santa Cruz	1–2	ASA	Recife
16:00 (UTC-3)	Rafael Furtado 78'	Report	Alex Alves 22' (o.g.); Roger Gaúcho 87'	Stadium: Estádio José do Rego Maciel (Arruda); Referee: Raimundo Rodrigues de Oliveira Junior

4 May 2022 3	Juazeirense	1–0	Santa Cruz	Recife
20:00 (UTC-3)	Nixon 90+2'	Report		Stadium: Estádio José do Rego Maciel (Arruda); Referee: Gustavo Nogas

8 May 2022 4	Santa Cruz	3–2	Atlético de Alagoinhas	Recife
16:00 (UTC-3)	Raphael Macena 32', 50'; Matheuzinho 42'	Report	Hadrian 9', 26'	Stadium: Estádio José do Rego Maciel (Arruda); Referee: Mayron Frederico dos Reis Novais

15 May 2022 5	Jacuipense	2–0	Santa Cruz	Riachão do Jacuípe
16:00 (UTC-3)	Ruan Levine 53'; Welder 90+1'	Report		Stadium: Estádio Eliel Martins (Valfredão); Referee: Tiago Ramos de Oliveira

22 May 2022 6	Santa Cruz	2–1	CSE	Recife
16:00 (UTC-3)	Rafael Alemão 72'; Rafael Furtado 76'	Report	Hugo 12'	Stadium: Estádio José do Rego Maciel (Arruda); Referee: Robson Babinski

29 May 2022 7	Sergipe	1–1	Santa Cruz	Aracaju
16:00 (UTC-3)	Paulinho 2'	Report	Hugo Cabral 90+6'	Stadium: Estádio Lourival Baptista (Batistão); Referee: Murilo Ugolini Klein

5 June 2022 8	Santa Cruz	1–0	Sergipe	Recife
16:00 (UTC-3)	Hugo Cabral 42'	Report		Stadium: Estádio José do Rego Maciel (Arruda); Referee: Renato Pinheiro

11 June 2022 9	CSE	0–0	Santa Cruz	Palmeira dos Índios
19:00 (UTC-3)		Report		Stadium: Estádio Municipal Juca Sampaio; Referee: Tarcisio Flores da Silva

19 June 2022 10	Santa Cruz	0–2	Jacuipense	Recife
16:00 (UTC-3)		Report	Thiaguinho 20'; Robinho 51'	Stadium: Estádio José do Rego Maciel (Arruda); Referee: Davi de Oliveira Lacerda

27 June 2022 11	Atlético de Alagoinhas	1–4	Santa Cruz	Feira de Santana
20:30 (UTC-3)	Cesinha 11'	Report	Matheuzinho 43', 45+1'; Hugo Cabral 58'; Anderson Ceará 90+1'	Stadium: Estádio Professor Jodilton Souza (Arena Cajueiro); Referee: Matheus Delgado Candançan

3 July 2022 12	Santa Cruz	1–0	Juazeirense	Recife
16:00 (UTC-3)	Hugo Cabral 46'	Report		Stadium: Estádio José do Rego Maciel (Arruda); Referee: Rafael Odilio Ramos dos Santos

10 July 2022 13	ASA	2–0	Santa Cruz	Arapiraca
16:00 (UTC-3)	Benedito 29'; Xandy 90'	Report		Stadium: Estádio Municipal Coaracy da Mata Fonseca (Fumeirão); Referee: Alisson Sidnei Furtado

16 July 2022 14	Santa Cruz	1–1	Lagarto	Recife
16:00 (UTC-3)	Hugo Cabral 45'	Report	Neto Oliveira 7'	Stadium: Estádio José do Rego Maciel (Arruda); Referee: Thiago Luis Scarascati

==== Round of 32 ====
24 July 2022	Santa Cruz	0–0	Retrô	Recife
16:00 (UTC-3)		Report		Stadium: Estádio José do Rego Maciel (Arruda); Referee: José Mendonça da Silva Junior

1 August 2022	Retrô	1–2	Santa Cruz	São Lourenço da Mata
20:00 (UTC-3)	Radsley 28'	Report	Hugo Cabral 2', 38'	Stadium: Estádio Governador Carlos Wilson Campos (Arena Pernambuco); Referee: Leandro Pedro Vuaden

==== Round of 16 ====
7 August 2022	Santa Cruz	0–0	Tocantinópolis	Recife
16:00 (UTC-3)		Report		Stadium: Estádio José do Rego Maciel (Arruda); Referee: Rafael Rodrigo Klein

14 August 2022	Tocantinópolis	1–0	Santa Cruz	Tocantinópolis
16:00 (UTC-3)	Chico Bala 87'	Report		Stadium: Estádio João Ribeiro (Ribeirão); Referee: Rafael Traci

==== Record ====
Final Position	Points	Matches	Wins	Draws	Losses	Goals For	Goals Away	Avg%
16th	24	18	6	6	6	16	17	44%
