= 2017 Clube Náutico Capibaribe season =

Náutico
2017 season
- Chairman: Ivan Brondi; Gustavo Ventura; Ivan Pinto
- Manager: Dado Cavalcanti; Milton Cruz; Waldemar Lemos; Beto Campos
- Stadium: Arena Pernambuco
- Série B: 20th
- Pernambucano: Semi-finals
- Copa do Nordeste: Group stage
- Copa do Brasil: First round
- Top goalscorer: League: William (5); All: Erick (9)
Home colours	Away colours	Third colours

The 2017 season was Náutico's 117th season in the club's history. Náutico competed in the Campeonato Pernambucano, Copa do Nordeste, Copa do Brasil and Série B.

== Squad ==
Note: Flags indicate national team as defined under FIFA eligibility rules; some limited exceptions apply. Players may hold more than one non-FIFA nationality.

No.	Pos.	Nation	Player
2	DF	BRA	Joazi
4	DF	BRA	Léo Carioca
5	MF	BRA	Amaral
10	MF	BRA	Giovanni
12	GK	BRA	Bruno
15	MF	BRA	Renan Paulino
17	MF	BRA	Niel
21	MF	BRA	Cal
22	DF	BRA	David
23	GK	BRA	Sergio
25	MF	BRA	Luiz Henrique
29	DF	BRA	Aislan
30	DF	BRA	Rafael Ribeiro
32	GK	BRA	Jeferson
33	FW	BRA	Erick
35	DF	BRA	Breno Calixto
51	DF	BRA	Henrique Ávila

No.	Pos.	Nation	Player
52	DF	BRA	Sueliton
69	MF	BRA	Diego Miranda
70	MF	BRA	Jobson
71	MF	BRA	Iago Santos
72	DF	BRA	Feliphe Gabriel
80	MF	BRA	Bruno Mota
84	FW	BRA	Gilmar
87	MF	BRA	William Schuster
88	MF	BRA	Darlan
91	FW	BRA	Vinícius
93	DF	BRA	Léo
95	FW	BRA	Alison
96	DF	BRA	Manoel
97	FW	BRA	Gerônimo
99	FW	BRA	Leilson
—	FW	BRA	Odilávio
—	FW	BRA	William

== Statistics ==
=== Overall ===
Games played	59 (6 Copa do Nordeste, 14 Pernambucano, 1 Copa do Brasil, 38 Série B)
Games won	16 (3 Copa do Nordeste, 5 Pernambucano, 0 Copa do Brasil, 8 Série B)
Games drawn	14 (1 Copa do Nordeste, 5 Pernambucano, 0 Copa do Brasil, 8 Série B)
Games lost	29 (2 Copa do Nordeste, 4 Pernambucano, 1 Copa do Brasil, 22 Série B)
Goals scored	63
Goals conceded	71
Goal difference	–8
Best results (goal difference)	9–0 (A) v Uniclinic - Copa do Nordeste - 2017.03.22
Worst result (goal difference)	0–3 (A) v Figueirense - Série B - 2017.05.20; 0–3 (A) v Paraná - Série B - 2017.09.26; 0–3 (A) v Luverdense - Série B - 2017.11.25
Top scorer	Erick (9)

Source: Náutico official website

=== Goalscorers ===
Place	Position	Nationality	Number	Name	Copa do Nordeste	Campeonato Pernambucano	Copa do Brasil	Série B	Total
1	FW	(Brazil)	33	Erick	3	4	0	2	9
2	FW	(Brazil)	9	Anselmo	2	5	0	0	7
3	FW	(Brazil)	9	William	0	0	0	5	5
4	FW	(Brazil)	77	Giva	4	0	0	0	4
4	MF	(Brazil)	10	Marco Antônio	0	4	0	0	4
4	FW	(Brazil)	91	Vinicius	0	0	0	4	4
5	MF	(Brazil)	20	Bruno Mota	0	0	0	3	3
5	MF	(Brazil)	10	Giovanni	0	1	0	2	3
6	DF	(Brazil)	29	Aislan	0	0	0	2	2
6	MF	(Brazil)	84	Gilmar	0	0	0	2	2
6	FW	(Brazil)	11	Jefferson Nem	2	0	0	0	2
6	DF	(Brazil)	96	Manoel	0	1	0	1	2
6	MF	(Brazil)	18	Maylson	0	2	0	0	2
7	FW	(Brazil)	95	Alison	0	1	0	0	1
7	DF	(Brazil)	35	Breno Calixto	0	0	0	1	1
7	FW	(Brazil)	16	Dico	0	0	0	1	1
7	MF	(Brazil)	7	Dudu Figueiredo	0	1	0	0	1
7	FW	(Brazil)	71	Iago	0	0	0	1	1
7	FW	(Brazil)	16	Igor Neves	0	1	0	0	1
7	MF	(Brazil)	20	Juninho	1	0	0	0	1
7	DF	(Brazil)	27	Nirley	1	0	0	0	1
7	FW	(Brazil)	9	Rafael Oliveira	0	0	0	1	1
7	MF	(Brazil)	11	Rafinha	0	0	0	1	1
7	DF	(Brazil)	2	Sueliton	0	0	0	1	1
				Own goals	1	0	0	2	3
				Total	14	20	0	29	63

=== Home record ===
São Lourenço da Mata	Caruaru	Recife
Arena Pernambuco	Lacerdão	Estádio do Arruda
Capacity: 44,300	Capacity: 19,478	Capacity: 55,582
24 matches (7 wins 8 draws 9 losses)	4 matches (2 wins 2 losses)	1 match (1 loss)

== Official Competitions ==
=== Copa do Nordeste ===
==== Group stage ====
24 January 2017 1	Náutico	4–0	Uniclinic	São Lourenço da Mata
20:00 (UTC-3)	Giva 10'; Jefferson Nem 29', 47'; Juninho 90+6'	Report		Stadium: Estádio Governador Carlos Wilson Campos (Arena Pernambuco); Attendance: 2,410; Referee: Claudio Francisco Lima e Silva

4 February 2017 2	Santa Cruz	1–0	Náutico	Recife
17:00 (UTC-3)	Éverton Santos 52'	Report		Stadium: Estádio José do Rego Maciel (Arruda); Attendance: 5,086; Referee: Denis da Silva Ribeiro Serafim

12 February 2017 3	Campinense	2–0	Náutico	Campina Grande
17:00 (UTC-3)	Renatinho 88'; Léo Ceará 90+3'	Report		Stadium: Estádio Governador Ernani Sátyro (Amigão); Attendance: 7,018; Referee: Antônio Santos Nunes

23 February 2017 4	Náutico	0–0	Campinense	São Lourenço da Mata
20:30 (UTC-3)		Report		Stadium: Estádio Governador Carlos Wilson Campos (Arena Pernambuco); Attendance: 2,164; Referee: Jailson Macedo Freitas

12 March 2017 5	Náutico	1–0	Santa Cruz	São Lourenço da Mata
16:00 (UTC-3)	Nirley 17'	Report		Stadium: Estádio Governador Carlos Wilson Campos (Arena Pernambuco); Attendance: 3,851; Referee: Caio Max Augusto Vieira

22 March 2017 6	Uniclinic	0–9	Náutico	Horizonte
21:45 (UTC-3)		Report	Giva 1', 15', 71'; Erick 4', 37', 85'; Wesclei 11' (o.g.); Anselmo 17', 60'	Stadium: Estádio Olímpico Horácio Domingos De Sousa (Domingão); Attendance: 73; Referee: Eduardo de Santana Nunes

==== Record ====
Final position	Points	Matches	Wins	Draws	Losses	Goals for	Goals away	Avg%
9th	10	6	3	1	2	14	3	55%

=== Campeonato Pernambucano ===
==== First stage ====
29 January 2017 1	Náutico	1–1	Santa Cruz	São Lourenço da Mata
17:00 (UTC-3)	Anselmo 90'	Report	Léo Costa 90+3'	Stadium: Estádio Governador Carlos Wilson Campos (Arena Pernambuco); Attendance: 4,620; Referee: Péricles Bassols

1 February 2017 2	Central	0–1	Náutico	Caruaru
(UTC-3)		Report	Maylson 81'	Stadium: Estádio Antônio Inácio de Souza; Attendance: 2,060; Referee: José Woshington da Silva

8 February 2017 3	Náutico	0–2	Salgueiro	São Lourenço da Mata
(UTC-3)		Report	Valdeir 53'; Álvaro 75'	Stadium: Estádio Governador Carlos Wilson Campos (Arena Pernambuco); Attendance: 1,369; Referee: Tiago Nascimento dos Santos

20 February 2017 4	Belo Jardim	0–2	Náutico	Recife
(UTC-3)		Report	Marco Antônio 48'; Erick 90' (pen.)	Stadium: Estádio José do Rego Maciel (Arruda); Attendance: 758

1 March 2017 5	Sport	1–1	Náutico	Recife
21:45 (UTC-3)	Neto Moura 40'	Report	Erick 29' (pen.)	Stadium: Estádio Adelmar da Costa Carvalho (Ilha do Retiro); Attendance: 3,430; Referee: José Woshington da Silva

5 March 2017 6	Náutico	2–1	Sport	São Lourenço da Mata
16:00 (UTC-3)	Marco Antônio 55'; Erick 64'	Report	Ronaldo Alves 70'	Stadium: Estádio Governador Carlos Wilson Campos (Arena Pernambuco); Attendance: 6,419; Referee: Luiz Cláudio Sobral

18 March 2017 7	Salgueiro	2–0	Náutico	Salgueiro
(UTC-3)	Willian Lira 43'; Levi 82'	Report		Stadium: Estádio Cornélio de Barros; Attendance: 2,242; Referee: Gilberto Castro Junior

25 March 2017 8	Náutico	1–1	Belo Jardim	São Lourenço da Mata
(UTC-3)	Manoel 47'	Report	Bruno Sacomani 83'	Stadium: Estádio Governador Carlos Wilson Campos (Arena Pernambuco); Attendance: 1,507; Referee: Tiago Nascimento dos Santos

5 April 2017 9	Náutico	5–0	Central	São Lourenço da Mata
(UTC-3)	Marco Antônio 28'; Maylson 59'; Anselmo 64', 76'; Igor Neves 77'	Report		Stadium: Estádio Governador Carlos Wilson Campos (Arena Pernambuco)

10 April 2017 10	Santa Cruz	1–2	Náutico	Recife
(UTC-3)	Éverton Santos 52'	Report	Erick 19'; Dudu Figueiredo 76'	Stadium: Estádio José do Rego Maciel (Arruda); Attendance: 23,710; Referee: Péricles Bassols

==== Semi-finals ====
16 April 2017	Sport	3–2	Náutico	Recife
16:00 (UTC-3)	Diego Souza 51'; Juninho 90', 90+2'	Report	Marco Antônio 45'; Anselmo 64'	Stadium: Estádio Adelmar da Costa Carvalho (Ilha do Retiro); Attendance: 15,082; Referee: Wagner do Nascimento Magalhães

23 April 2017	Náutico	1–1	Sport	São Lourenço da Mata
16:00 (UTC-3)	Giovanni 33'	Report	Matheus Ferraz 34'	Stadium: Estádio Governador Carlos Wilson Campos (Arena Pernambuco); Attendance: 19,541; Referee: Anderson Daronco

==== Match for Third Place ====
6 May 2017	Náutico	1–2	Santa Cruz	São Lourenço da Mata
(UTC-3)	Alison 78'	Report	André Luis 45'; Roberto 61'	Stadium: Estádio Governador Carlos Wilson Campos (Arena Pernambuco); Attendance: 3,267; Referee: Débora Cecília

16 May 2017	Santa Cruz	1–1	Náutico	Recife
(UTC-3)	Éverton Santos 45+2'	Report	Anselmo 84'	Stadium: Estádio José do Rego Maciel (Arruda); Attendance: 3,387

==== Record ====
Final position	Points	Matches	Wins	Draws	Losses	Goals for	Goals away	Avg%
4th	20	14	5	5	4	20	16	47%

=== Copa do Brasil ===
==== First stage ====
15 February 2017	Guarani de Juazeiro	1–0	Náutico	Juazeiro do Norte
22:30 (UTC-3)	Italo 53'	Report		Stadium: Estádio Mauro Sampaio (Romeirão); Attendance: 2,803; Referee: Antonio Dib Moraes de Sousa

==== Record ====
Final position	Points	Matches	Wins	Draws	Losses	Goals for	Goals away	Avg%
74th	0	1	0	0	1	0	1	0%

=== Série B ===
==== Matches ====
12 May 2017 1	Náutico	0–0	América–MG	São Lourenço da Mata
21:30 (UTC-3)		Report		Stadium: Estádio Governador Carlos Wilson Campos (Arena Pernambuco); Referee: Vinicius Furlan

20 May 2017 2	Figueirense	3–0	Náutico	Florianópolis
16:30 (UTC-3)	Jorge Henrique 11'; Robinho 31'; Henan 73'	Report		Stadium: Estádio Orlando Scarpelli; Attendance: 3,693; Referee: Rodrigo Carvalhaes de Miranda

27 May 2017 3	Náutico	0–2	Ceará	São Lourenço da Mata
16:30 (UTC-3)		Report	Roberto César 75'; Felipe Menezes 87'	Stadium: Estádio Governador Carlos Wilson Campos (Arena Pernambuco); Attendance: 2,855; Referee: Dyorgines José Padovani de Andrade

30 May 2017 4	Brasil de Pelotas	2–0	Náutico	Pelotas
21:30 (UTC-3)	Wagner 21'; Nem 84'	Report		Stadium: Estádio Bento Mendes de Freitas; Attendance: 1,840; Referee: Luiz César de Oliveira Magalhães

6 June 2017 5	Náutico	1–1	Oeste	São Lourenço da Mata
20:30 (UTC-3)	Manoel 64'	Report	Robert 70'	Stadium: Estádio Governador Carlos Wilson Campos (Arena Pernambuco); Attendance: 1,669; Referee: Adriano Milczvski

10 June 2017 6	Internacional	4–2	Náutico	Porto Alegre
16:30 (UTC-3)	Carlos 9'; William Pottker 51'; D'Alessandro 57'; Marcelo Cirino 90+2'	Report	Vinicius 44'; Iago 84'	Stadium: Estádio José Pinheiro Borda (Beira-Rio); Attendance: 20,310; Referee: Paulo Roberto Alves Junior

13 June 2017 7	Náutico	1–2	Paraná	São Lourenço da Mata
19:15 (UTC-3)	Vinicius 5'	Report	Guilherme Minho 8'; Robson 90'	Stadium: Estádio Governador Carlos Wilson Campos (Arena Pernambuco); Attendance: 1,700; Referee: Marcelo Aparecido R de Souza

17 June 2017 8	Boa Esporte	2–1	Náutico	Varginha
16:30 (UTC-3)	Fellipe Mateus 42'; Rodolfo 44'	Report	Aislan 18'	Stadium: Estádio Municipal Prefeito Dilson Luiz de Melo (Melão); Attendance: 838; Referee: Bruno Rezende Silva

20 June 2017 9	Náutico	2–3	Goiás	São Lourenço da Mata
19:15 (UTC-3)	Everton Sena 38' (o.g.); Vinicius 76'	Report	Carlos Eduardo 2'; Alex Alves 60'; Jarlan 85'	Stadium: Estádio Governador Carlos Wilson Campos (Arena Pernambuco); Attendance: 1,761; Referee: Emerson de Almeida Ferreira

24 June 2017 10	Guarani	2–1	Náutico	Campinas
19:00 (UTC-3)	Fumagalli 17', 40'	Report	Giovanni 27'	Stadium: Estádio Brinco de Ouro da Princesa; Attendance: 3,797; Referee: Claudio Francisco Lima e Silva

30 June 2017 11	Náutico	0–1	CRB	São Lourenço da Mata
21:30 (UTC-3)		Report	Zé Carlos 69'	Stadium: Estádio Governador Carlos Wilson Campos (Arena Pernambuco); Attendance: 4,289; Referee: Devarly Lira do Rosário

4 July 2017 12	ABC	0–1	Náutico	Natal
21:30 (UTC-3)		Report	Gilmar 67'	Stadium: Estádio Maria Lamas Farache (Frasqueirão); Attendance: 4,124; Referee: Rodrigo D Alonso Ferreira

11 July 2017 13	Náutico	1–1	Juventude	São Lourenço da Mata
21:30 (UTC-3)	Gilmar 36'	Report	Wallacer 58'	Stadium: Estádio Governador Carlos Wilson Campos (Arena Pernambuco); Attendance: 5,903; Referee: Eduardo Tomaz de Aquino Valadão

15 July 2017 14	Náutico	0–0	Santa Cruz	São Lourenço da Mata
16:30 (UTC-3)		Report		Stadium: Estádio Governador Carlos Wilson Campos (Arena Pernambuco); Attendance: 13,450; Referee: Elmo Alves Resende Cunha

18 July 2017 15	Paysandu	1–0	Náutico	Belém
19:15 (UTC-3)	Bergson 81'	Report		Stadium: Estádio Olímpico do Pará (Mangueirão); Attendance: 5,373; Referee: João Batista de Arruda

22 July 2017 16	Londrina	0–0	Náutico	Londrina
16:30 (UTC-3)		Report		Stadium: Estádio Jacy Scaff (do Café); Attendance: 3,447; Referee: Salim Fende Chavez

29 July 2017 17	Náutico	1–2	Criciúma	São Lourenço da Mata
19:00 (UTC-3)	Erick 52'	Report	Silvinho 4', 54'	Stadium: Estádio Governador Carlos Wilson Campos (Arena Pernambuco); Attendance: 4,083; Referee: Jean Pierre Goncalves Lima

1 August 2017 18	Vila Nova	0–1	Náutico	Goiânia
20:30 (UTC-3)		Report	Breno Calixto 32'	Stadium: Estádio do Governo do Estado de Goiás (Serra Dourada); Attendance: 0 Referee: Felipe Gomes da Silva

4 August 2017 19	Náutico	1–0	Luverdense	São Lourenço da Mata
20:30 (UTC-3)	Erick 63'	Report		Stadium: Estádio Governador Carlos Wilson Campos (Arena Pernambuco); Attendance: 4,789; Referee: Pathrice Wallace Corrêa Maia

11 August 2017 20	América–MG	1–0	Náutico	Belo Horizonte
21:30 (UTC-3)	Hugo Almeida 40'	Report		Stadium: Estádio Raimundo Sampaio (Independência); Attendance: 3,394; Referee: Rodolpho Toski Marques

15 August 2017 21	Náutico	2–0	Figueirense	São Lourenço da Mata
21:30 (UTC-3)	Giovanni 17'; William 32'	Report		Stadium: Estádio Governador Carlos Wilson Campos (Arena Pernambuco); Attendance: 3,682; Referee: Francisco Carlos do Nascimento

25 August 2017 22	Ceará	1–0	Náutico	Fortaleza
19:15 (UTC-3)	Lima 13'	Report		Stadium: Estádio Presidente Vargas; Attendance: 8,554; Referee: Daniel Nobre Bins

6 September 2017 23	Náutico	1–0	Brasil de Pelotas	São Lourenço da Mata
21:45 (UTC-3)	Vinicius 87'	Report		Stadium: Estádio Governador Carlos Wilson Campos (Arena Pernambuco); Attendance: 4,648; Referee: Antonio Dib Moraes de Sousa

16 September 2017 24	Oeste	1–0	Náutico	Barueri
16:30 (UTC-3)	Robert 72'	Report		Stadium: Arena Barueri; Attendance: 1,696; Referee: Grazianni Maciel Rocha

23 September 2017 25	Náutico	0–1	Internacional	Caruaru
16:30 (UTC-3)		Report	Leandro Damião 51'	Stadium: Estádio Luiz José de Lacerda (Lacerdão); Attendance: 13,409; Referee: Jailson Macedo Freitas

26 September 2017 26	Paraná	3–0	Náutico	Curitiba
20:30 (UTC-3)	Alemão 46'; Iago Maidana 56'; Robson 68'	Report		Stadium: Estádio Durival Britto e Silva (Vila Capanema); Attendance: 9,712; Referee: Sávio Pereira Sampaio

30 September 2017 27	Náutico	2–0	Boa Esporte	Caruaru
16:30 (UTC-3)	Rafael Oliveira 20' (pen.); Dico 89'	Report		Stadium: Estádio Luiz José de Lacerda (Lacerdão); Attendance: 2,144; Referee: Thiago Duarte Peixoto

6 October 2017 28	Goiás	2–0	Náutico	Goiânia
21:30 (UTC-3)	Carlos Eduardo 43'; Tiago Luís 78'	Report		Stadium: Estádio do Governo do Estado de Goiás (Serra Dourada); Attendance: 12,347; Referee: Jean Pierre Goncalves Lima

14 October 2017 29	Náutico	2–0	Guarani	Caruaru
19:00 (UTC-3)	Rafinha 12'; Bruno Mota 77'	Report		Stadium: Estádio Luiz José de Lacerda (Lacerdão); Attendance: 1,949; Referee: Pablo dos Santos Alves

17 October 2017 30	CRB	2–2	Náutico	Maceió
21:30 (UTC-3)	João Paulo 45+2'; Neto Baiano 84'	Report	Sueliton 28'; Bruno Mota 82'	Stadium: Estádio Rei Pelé; Attendance: 10,664; Referee: Wanderson Alves de Sousa

20 October 2017 31	Náutico	1–2	ABC	Caruaru
20:30 (UTC-3)	William 48'	Report	Rodrigues 23'; Lucas Coelho 83'	Stadium: Estádio Luiz José de Lacerda (Lacerdão); Attendance: 2,474; Referee: Daniel Nobre Bins

24 October 2017 32	Juventude	0–0	Náutico	Caxias do Sul
19:15 (UTC-3)		Report		Stadium: Estádio Alfredo Jaconi; Attendance: 3,148; Referee: Emerson de Almeida Ferreira

4 November 2017 33	Santa Cruz	2–3	Náutico	Recife
17:30 (UTC-3)	Anderson Salles 45+1'; João Paulo 48'	Report	William 32', 58', 90+5'	Stadium: Estádio José do Rego Maciel (Arruda); Attendance: 8,564; Referee: Thiago Duarte Peixoto

7 November 2017 34	Náutico	1–3	Paysandu	São Lourenço da Mata
20:30 (UTC-3)	Perema 14' (o.g.)	Report	Bergson 13'; Caion 65', 90+4'	Stadium: Estádio Governador Carlos Wilson Campos (Arena Pernambuco); Attendance: 2,310; Referee: Felipe Gomes da Silva

11 November 2017 35	Náutico	1–2	Londrina	São Lourenço da Mata
17:30 (UTC-3)	Aislan 49'	Report	Carlos Henrique 42'; Germano 90+1'	Stadium: Estádio Governador Carlos Wilson Campos (Arena Pernambuco); Attendance: 1,120; Referee: Jean Pierre Goncalves Lima

14 November 2017 36	Criciúma	0–0	Náutico	Criciúma
19:15 (UTC-3)		Report		Stadium: Estádio Heriberto Hülse; Attendance: 1,465; Referee: Alinor Silva da Paixão

18 November 2017 37	Náutico	1–2	Vila Nova	Recife
17:30 (UTC-3)	Bruno Mota 80'	Report	Jenison 48'; Alan Mineiro 90+3'	Stadium: Estádio José do Rego Maciel (Arruda); Attendance: 286; Referee: Grazianni Maciel Rocha

25 November 2017 38	Luverdense	3–0	Náutico	Lucas do Rio Verde
17:30 (UTC-3)	Douglas Baggio 8', 80'; Paulinho 70'	Report		Stadium: Estádio Municipal Passo das Emas; Attendance: 512; Referee: Renan Roberto de Souza

==== Record ====
Final position	Points	Matches	Wins	Draws	Losses	Goals for	Goals away	Avg%
20th	32	38	8	8	22	29	51	28%
