= 2015 Clube Náutico Capibaribe season =

Náutico
2015 season
- Chairman: Glauber Vasconcelos
- Manager: Moacir Júnior; Levi Gomes (c); Lisca; Gilmar Dal Pozzo
- Stadium: Arena Pernambuco
- Série B: 5th
- Pernambucano: First stage
- Copa do Brasil: Third round
- Copa do Nordeste: Group stage
- Top goalscorer: League: Daniel Morais and Douglas (6); All: Josimar (8)
Home colours	Away colours	Third colours

The 2015 season was Náutico's 115th season in the club's history. Náutico competed in the Campeonato Pernambucano, Copa do Nordeste, Copa do Brasil and Série B.

== Squad ==
Note: Flags indicate national team as defined under FIFA eligibility rules; some limited exceptions apply. Players may hold more than one non-FIFA nationality.

No.	Pos.	Nation	Player
—	GK	BRA	Bruno
—	GK	BRA	Jefferson Gol
—	GK	BRA	Júlio César
—	DF	BRA	Bernardo
—	DF	BRA	David
—	DF	BRA	Diego
—	DF	BRA	Elivélton
—	DF	BRA	Flávio Ramos
—	DF	URU	Gastón Filgueira
—	DF	BRA	Fabiano Eller
—	DF	BRA	Lucas Piauí
—	DF	BRA	Ronaldo Alves
—	DF	BRA	Welton Felipe
—	MF	BRA	Adniel
—	MF	BRA	Anderson Preto
—	MF	BRA	Bruno Alves

No.	Pos.	Nation	Player
—	MF	BRA	Fillipe Soutto
—	MF	BRA	Guilherme Lucena
—	MF	BRA	Gustavo Henrique
—	MF	BRA	Helder Ribeiro
—	MF	BRA	Igor Neves
—	MF	BRA	Jefferson Renan
—	MF	BRA	João Ananias
—	MF	BRA	Patrick Vieira
—	MF	BRA	Pedro Carmona
—	MF	BRA	Willian Magrão
—	FW	BRA	João Paulo
—	FW	BRA	Josimar
—	FW	BRA	Renato Henrique
—	FW	BRA	Ronny
—	FW	BRA	Stéfano Yuri

== Statistics ==
=== Overall ===
Games played	59 (10 Pernambucano, 6 Copa do Nordeste, 5 Copa do Brasil, 38 Série B)
Games won	25 (2 Pernambucano, 2 Copa do Nordeste, 3 Copa do Brasil, 18 Série B)
Games drawn	16 (4 Pernambucano, 2 Copa do Nordeste, 1 Copa do Brasil, 9 Série B)
Games lost	18 (4 Pernambucano, 2 Copa do Nordeste, 1 Copa do Brasil, 11 Série B)
Goals scored	76
Goals conceded	68
Goal difference	+8
Best results (goal difference)	4–0 (H) v Serra Talhada - Pernambucano - 2015.02.11
Worst result (goal difference)	1–5 (A) v Luverdense - Série B - 2015.08.22
Top scorer	Josimar (8)

Source: Náutico official website

=== Goalscorers ===
Place	Position	Nationality	Number	Name	Campeonato Pernambucano	Copa do Nordeste	Copa do Brasil	Série B	Total
1	FW	(Brazil)	20	Josimar	4	3	1	0	8
2	FW	(Brazil)	9	Douglas	0	0	1	6	7
2	MF	(Brazil)	10	Patrick Vieira	0	3	1	3	7
3	FW	(Brazil)	9	Daniel Morais	0	0	0	6	6
4	FW	(Brazil)	11	Bergson	0	0	0	4	4
4	DF	(Brazil)	2	Rafael Pereira	0	0	0	4	4
4	MF	(Brazil)	19	Renato Henrique	3	1	0	0	4
4	DF	(Brazil)	3	Ronaldo Alves	0	0	0	4	4
5	FW	(Brazil)	18	Bruno Alves	2	0	0	1	3
5	DF	(Brazil)	2	Guilherme Lucena	1	0	0	2	3
5	MF	(Brazil)	11	Hiltinho	0	0	0	3	3
5	MF	(Brazil)	17	Pedro Carmona	0	0	1	2	3
6	DF	(Brazil)	13	Diego Silva	0	0	0	2	2
6	DF	(Brazil)	4	Fabiano Eller	0	0	0	2	2
6	DF	(Uruguay)	6	Gastón Filgueira	0	1	0	1	2
6	MF	(Brazil)	20	Gil Mineiro	0	0	0	2	2
6	MF	(Brazil)	8	Marino	0	0	0	2	2
7	MF	(Brazil)	17	Anderson Preto	0	0	1	0	1
7	MF	(Brazil)	16	Fillipe Soutto	0	1	0	0	1
7	MF	(Brazil)	10	Guilherme Biteco	0	0	0	1	1
7	MF	(Brazil)	17	Jefferson Renan	0	1	0	0	1
7	MF	(Brazil)	80	João Ananias	0	0	0	1	1
7	FW	(Brazil)	21	João Paulo	1	0	0	0	1
7	FW	(Brazil)	7	Rogerinho	0	0	0	1	1
7	FW	(Brazil)	20	Stéfano Yuri	0	0	0	1	1
7	MF	(Brazil)	11	Willian Magrão	0	0	0	1	1
				Own goals	0	0	1	0	1
				Total	11	10	6	49	76

=== Home record ===
São Lourenço da Mata	Recife
Arena Pernambuco	Estádio dos Aflitos
Capacity: 44,300	Capacity: 19,800
29 matches (16 wins 9 draws 4 losses)	1 match (1 draw)

== Friendlies ==
17 January 2015	Náutico	0–0	Decisão	Recife
16:00 (UTC-3)		Report		Stadium: Estádio Eládio de Barros Carvalho (Aflitos)

=== Supercopa do Maranhão ===
22 January 2015	Náutico	2–1	Vitória	São Luís
19:30 (UTC-3)	João Paulo 37'; Filgueira 62'	Report	Kadu 42'	Stadium: Estádio Governador João Castelo (Castelão); Referee: Maykon Matos Nunes

25 January 2015	Sampaio Corrêa	1–0	Náutico	São Luís
19:00 (UTC-3)	Válber 30'	Report		Stadium: Estádio Governador João Castelo (Castelão); Referee: Ranilton Oliveira de Sousa

== Official Competitions ==
=== Campeonato Pernambucano ===
==== First stage ====
1 February 2015 1	Náutico	0–0	Salgueiro	São Lourenço da Mata
16:00 (UTC-3)		Report		Stadium: Estádio Governador Carlos Wilson Campos (Arena Pernambuco); Attendance: 5,429; Referee: Gleydson Leite

8 February 2015 2	Sport	1–0	Náutico	São Lourenço da Mata
18:30 (UTC-3)	Samuel 28'	Report		Stadium: Estádio Governador Carlos Wilson Campos (Arena Pernambuco); Attendance: 13,519; Referee: Emerson Sobral

11 February 2015 3	Náutico	4–0	Serra Talhada	São Lourenço da Mata
21:20 (UTC-3)	Renato Henrique 8'; Josimar 74', 85'; Guilherme Lucena 89'	Report		Stadium: Estádio Governador Carlos Wilson Campos (Arena Pernambuco); Attendance: 2,581; Referee: Giorgio Wilton Macêdo dos Santos

22 February 2015 4	Central	1–1	Náutico	Caruaru
16:00 (UTC-3)	Jucemar 3'	Report	João Paulo 90+2'	Stadium: Estádio Luiz José de Lacerda (Lacerdão); Attendance: 8,903; Referee: Marcelo de Lima Henrique

25 February 2015 5	Náutico	1–2	Santa Cruz	São Lourenço da Mata
22:00 (UTC-3)	Renato Henrique 34'	Report	Rafael Alemão 43'; Betinho 86'	Stadium: Estádio Governador Carlos Wilson Campos (Arena Pernambuco); Attendance: 4,626

1 March 2015 6	Santa Cruz	0–0	Náutico	São Lourenço da Mata
16:00 (UTC-3)		Report		Stadium: Estádio Governador Carlos Wilson Campos (Arena Pernambuco); Attendance: 14,714; Referee: Nielson Nogueira Dias

8 March 2015 7	Náutico	2–2	Central	São Lourenço da Mata
18:30 (UTC-3)	Renato Henrique 51'; Josimar 56'	Report	Fabiano Tanque 47'; Candinho 70'	Stadium: Estádio Governador Carlos Wilson Campos (Arena Pernambuco); Attendance: 4,383; Referee: Ana Karina Marques Valentim

15 March 2015 8	Serra Talhada	0–2	Náutico	Serra Talhada
16:00 (UTC-3)		Report	Josimar 3'; Bruno Alves 64'	Stadium: Estádio Nildo Pereira de Menezes (Pereirão); Attendance: 4,735; Referee: Nielson Nogueira Dias

22 March 2015 9	Náutico	0–2	Sport	São Lourenço da Mata
16:00 (UTC-3)		Report	Wendel 46'; Ewerton Páscoa 77'	Stadium: Estádio Governador Carlos Wilson Campos (Arena Pernambuco); Attendance: 6,063

5 April 2015 10	Salgueiro	4–1	Náutico	Salgueiro
16:00 (UTC-3)	Rodolfo Potiguar 9'; Valdeir 49', 87'; Moreilândia 90+5'	Report	Bruno Alves 90+2'	Stadium: Estádio Cornélio de Barros (Salgueirão); Referee: Nielson Nogueira

==== Record ====
Final Position	Points	Matches	Wins	Draws	Losses	Goals For	Goals Away	Avg%
6th	10	10	2	4	4	11	12	33%

=== Copa do Nordeste ===
==== Group stage ====
5 February 2015 1	Náutico	2–2	Salgueiro	São Lourenço da Mata
20:45 (UTC-3)	Josimar 65'; Filgueira 69'	Report	Jefersom 35'; Anderson Lessa 71'	Stadium: Estádio Governador Carlos Wilson Campos (Arena Pernambuco); Attendance: 1,882; Referee: Sebastião Rufino Ribeiro Filho

14 February 2015 2	Moto Club	3–1	Náutico	São Luís
17:20 (UTC-3)	Gabriel 57'; Kléo 65'; Naôh 70'	Report	Josimar 9'	Stadium: Estádio Governador João Castelo (Castelão); Attendance: 2,722; Referee: Avelar Rodrigo da Silva

19 February 2015 3	Piauí	0–2	Náutico	Teresina
22:45 (UTC-3)		Report	Patrick Vieira 29'; Jefferson Renan 71'	Stadium: Estádio Governador Alberto Tavares Silva (Albertão); Attendance: 1,280; Referee: José Cleuton de Souza Lima

5 March 2015 4	Náutico	3–3	Piauí	São Lourenço da Mata
22:00 (UTC-3)	Patrick Vieira 49', 64'; Fillipe Soutto 77'	Report	Pablo 69'; Cláudio 80', 85'	Stadium: Estádio Governador Carlos Wilson Campos (Arena Pernambuco); Attendance: 698; Referee: Pablo dos Santos Alves

12 March 2015 5	Náutico	1–0	Moto Club	São Lourenço da Mata
19:00 (UTC-3)	Renato Henrique 51'	Report		Stadium: Estádio Governador Carlos Wilson Campos (Arena Pernambuco); Attendance: 1,447; Referee: Italo Medeiros de Azevedo

18 March 2015 6	Salgueiro	3–1	Náutico	Salgueiro
22:00 (UTC-3)	Anderson Lessa 23', 67'; Ranieri 30'	Report	Josimar 90+1'	Stadium: Estádio Cornélio de Barros (Salgueirão); Attendance: 8,950; Referee: Marcelo de Lima Henrique

==== Record ====
Final Position	Points	Matches	Wins	Draws	Losses	Goals For	Goals Away	Avg%
9th	8	6	2	2	2	10	11	44%

=== Copa do Brasil ===
==== First round ====
2 April 2015	Brasília	0–1	Náutico	Taguatinga
19:30 (UTC-3)		Report	Pedro Carmona 52'	Stadium: Estádio Elmo Serejo Farias; Attendance: 706; Referee: Eduardo Tomaz de Aquino Valadão

15 April 2015	Náutico	2–0	Brasília	São Lourenço da Mata
22:00 (UTC-3)	André Oliveira 14' (o.g.); Anderson Preto 85'	Report		Stadium: Estádio Governador Carlos Wilson Campos (Arena Pernambuco); Attendance: 2,170; Referee: Renan Roberto de Souza

==== Second round ====
30 April 2015	Jacuipense	0–2	Náutico	Riachão do Jacuípe
19:30 (UTC-3)		Report	Josimar 50'; Patrick Vieira 56'	Stadium: Estádio Eliel Martins (Valfredão); Attendance: 3,611; Referee: Cleisson Veloso Pereira

==== Third round ====
27 May 2015	Flamengo	1–1	Náutico	Rio de Janeiro
22:00 (UTC-3)	Wallace 42'	Report	Douglas 77'	Stadium: Estádio Jornalista Mário Filho (Maracanã); Attendance: 7,001; Referee: Francisco Carlos Nascimento

15 June 2015	Náutico	0–2	Flamengo	São Lourenço da Mata
22:00 (UTC-3)		Report	Jorge 50'; Guerrero 76'	Stadium: Estádio Governador Carlos Wilson Campos (Arena Pernambuco); Attendance: 14,919; Referee: Cláudio Francisco Lima e Silva

==== Record ====
Final Position	Points	Matches	Wins	Draws	Losses	Goals For	Goals Away	Avg%
22nd	10	5	3	1	1	6	3	66%

=== Série B ===
9 May 2015 1	Náutico	1–0	Luverdense	São Lourenço da Mata
16:30 (UTC-3)	Hiltinho 16'	Report		Stadium: Estádio Governador Carlos Wilson Campos (Arena Pernambuco); Attendance: 5,440; Referee: Leo Simão Holanda

16 May 2015 2	Boa Esporte	0–1	Náutico	Varginha
16:30 (UTC-3)		Report	Diego Silva 90+4'	Stadium: Estádio Municipal Prefeito Dilson Luiz de Melo (Melão); Attendance: 748; Referee: Alexandre Vargas Tavares de Jesus

19 May 2015 3	Náutico	2–0	Criciúma	São Lourenço da Mata
21:50 (UTC-3)	Douglas 13'; Ronaldo Alves 21'	Report		Stadium: Estádio Governador Carlos Wilson Campos (Arena Pernambuco); Attendance: 5,292; Referee: Pablo Ramon Goncalves Pinheiro

30 May 2015 4	Sampaio Corrêa	1–1	Náutico	São Luís
16:30 (UTC-3)	Edvânio 57'	Report	Douglas 90'	Stadium: Estádio Governador João Castelo (Castelão); Attendance: 13,528; Referee: Janio Pires Gonçalves

2 June 2015 5	Náutico	2–0	Ceará	São Lourenço da Mata
19:30 (UTC-3)	Ronaldo Alves 1'; Willian Magrão 50'	Report		Stadium: Estádio Governador Carlos Wilson Campos (Arena Pernambuco); Attendance: 10,997; Referee: Marcos Andre Gomes da Penha

5 June 2015 6	Náutico	2–1	América–MG	São Lourenço da Mata
19:30 (UTC-3)	Diego Silva 32'; Douglas 76'	Report	Marcelo Toscano 49'	Stadium: Estádio Governador Carlos Wilson Campos (Arena Pernambuco); Attendance: 11,285; Referee: Marielson Alves Silva

13 June 2015 7	Atlético Goianiense	2–0	Náutico	Goiânia
16:30 (UTC-3)	Juninho 6'; Arthur Caíke 54'	Report		Stadium: Estádio do Governo do Estado de Goiás (Serra Dourada); Attendance: 1,218; Referee: Alinor Silva da Paixão

16 June 2015 8	Náutico	1–1	Paysandu	São Lourenço da Mata
19:30 (UTC-3)	Pedro Carmona 5'	Report	Yago Pikachu 60'	Stadium: Estádio Governador Carlos Wilson Campos (Arena Pernambuco); Attendance: 6,390; Referee: Charles Hebert Cavalcante Ferreira

27 June 2015 9	ABC	3–3	Náutico	Natal
16:30 (UTC-3)	Kayke 37'; Marcílio 50'; Edno 86'	Report	Pedro Carmona 35'; Marino 45+1', 72'	Stadium: Estádio Maria Lamas Farache (Frasqueirão); Attendance: 4,544; Referee: Eduardo de Santana Nunes

4 July 2015 10	Náutico	2–1	Oeste	São Lourenço da Mata
16:30 (UTC-3)	Douglas 56'; Gil Mineiro 74'	Report	Júnior Negrão 70'	Stadium: Estádio Governador Carlos Wilson Campos (Arena Pernambuco); Attendance: 7,594; Referee: Edmar Campos Encarnação

7 July 2015 11	Mogi Mirim	2–1	Náutico	Mogi Mirim
19:30 (UTC-3)	Serginho 70', 88'	Report	Douglas 30'	Stadium: Estádio Vail Chaves; Attendance: 262; Referee: Carlos Eduardo Vieira Areas

11 July 2015 12	Náutico	2–1	Santa Cruz	São Lourenço da Mata
16:30 (UTC-3)	Guilherme Lucena 52'; Gil Mineiro 73'	Report	Anderson Aquino 58'	Stadium: Estádio Governador Carlos Wilson Campos (Arena Pernambuco); Attendance: 12,085; Referee: Sebastião Rufino Ribeiro Filho

18 July 2015 13	Botafogo	1–0	Náutico	Rio de Janeiro
16:30 (UTC-3)	Lulinha 76'	Report		Stadium: Estádio Olímpico João Havelange (Engenhão); Attendance: 9,049; Referee: Eduardo Tomaz de Aquino Valadão

25 July 2015 14	Náutico	2–1	Vitória	São Lourenço da Mata
16:30 (UTC-3)	Douglas 55'; Rafael Pereira 74'	Report	Rhayner 5'	Stadium: Estádio Governador Carlos Wilson Campos (Arena Pernambuco); Attendance: 7,848; Referee: Elmo Alves Resende Cunha

28 July 2015 15	Paraná	2–0	Náutico	Curitiba
19:30 (UTC-3)	Rafael Costa 4'; Fernando Viana 19'	Report		Stadium: Estádio Durival Britto e Silva (Vila Capanema); Attendance: 7,990; Referee: José Cláudio Rocha Filho

1 August 2015 16	Náutico	1–1	Macaé	São Lourenço da Mata
16:30 (UTC-3)	Fabiano Eller 40'	Report	Brinner 79'	Stadium: Estádio Governador Carlos Wilson Campos (Arena Pernambuco); Attendance: 6,570; Referee: Luiz César de Oliveira Magalhães

8 August 2015 17	CRB	1–0	Náutico	Maceió
16:30 (UTC-3)	Zé Carlos 59'	Report		Stadium: Estádio Rei Pelé; Attendance: 10,447; Referee: Rodrigo Batista Raposo

11 August 2015 18	Bahia	1–1	Náutico	Salvador
19:00 (UTC-3)	Vítor Costa 57'	Report	Patrick Vieira 43'	Stadium: Itaipava Arena Fonte Nova; Attendance: 23,187; Referee: Vinicius Furlan

15 August 2015 19	Náutico	3–1	Bragantino	São Lourenço da Mata
16:30 (UTC-3)	Patrick Vieira 33'; Rogerinho 67'; Stéfano Yuri 87'	Report	Alan Mineiro 90+3'	Stadium: Estádio Governador Carlos Wilson Campos (Arena Pernambuco); Attendance: 5,523; Referee: André Luiz de Freitas Castro

22 August 2015 20	Luverdense	5–1	Náutico	Lucas do Rio Verde
16:30 (UTC-3)	Tozin 6', 18'; Diego Rosa 47'; Alípio 73', 75'	Report	Daniel Morais 80'	Stadium: Estádio Municipal Passo das Emas; Attendance: 1,020; Referee: Diego Almeida Real

29 August 2015 21	Náutico	1–0	Boa Esporte	São Lourenço da Mata
16:30 (UTC-3)	Rafael Pereira 89'	Report		Stadium: Estádio Governador Carlos Wilson Campos (Arena Pernambuco); Attendance: 4,479; Referee: Claudio Francisco Lima e Silva

1 September 2015 22	Criciúma	1–0	Náutico	Criciúma
19:00 (UTC-3)	Lucca 35'	Report		Stadium: Estádio Heriberto Hülse; Attendance: 3,776; Referee: Pathrice Wallace Corrêa Maia

4 September 2015 23	Náutico	1–1	Sampaio Corrêa	São Lourenço da Mata
19:00 (UTC-3)	Patrick Vieira 18'	Report	Diones 6'	Stadium: Estádio Governador Carlos Wilson Campos (Arena Pernambuco); Attendance: 2,954; Referee: Luiz Flávio de Oliveira

7 September 2015 24	Ceará	1–0	Náutico	Fortaleza
19:00 (UTC-3)	Rafael Costa 79'	Report		Stadium: Estádio Governador Plácido Castelo (Castelão); Attendance: 12,335; Referee: Adriano Milczvski

12 September 2015 25	América–MG	2–1	Náutico	Belo Horizonte
16:30 (UTC-3)	Marcelo Toscano 13'; Felipe Amorim 65'	Report	Guilherme Lucena 90+2'	Stadium: Estádio Raimundo Sampaio (Independência); Attendance: 2,557; Referee: Rodolpho Toski Marques

15 September 2015 26	Náutico	1–1	Atlético Goianiense	São Lourenço da Mata
20:30 (UTC-3)	Bruno Alves 73'	Report	Juninho 63'	Stadium: Estádio Governador Carlos Wilson Campos (Arena Pernambuco); Attendance: 2,066; Referee: Antônio Rogério Batista do Prado

19 September 2015 27	Paysandu	0–1	Náutico	Belém
16:30 (UTC-3)		Report	Rafael Pereira 66'	Stadium: Estádio Olímpico do Pará (Mangueirão); Attendance: 18,133; Referee: Jean Pierre Gonçalves Lima

26 September 2015 28	Náutico	3–0	ABC	São Lourenço da Mata
16:30 (UTC-3)	Daniel Morais 48'; Bergson 50', 80'	Report		Stadium: Estádio Governador Carlos Wilson Campos (Arena Pernambuco); Attendance: 6,126; Referee: Flávio Rodrigues Guerra

3 October 2015 29	Oeste	2–0	Náutico	Osasco
16:30 (UTC-3)	Mazinho 34'; Patrik 79'	Report		Stadium: Estádio Prefeito José Liberatti; Attendance: 5,403; Referee: Alisson Sidnei Furtado

6 October 2015 30	Náutico	1–0	Mogi Mirim	São Lourenço da Mata
20:30 (UTC-3)	Filgueira 13'	Report		Stadium: Estádio Governador Carlos Wilson Campos (Arena Pernambuco); Attendance: 2,481; Referee: Pablo dos Santos Alves

17 October 2015 31	Santa Cruz	1–3	Náutico	Recife
16:30 (UTC-3)	Bruno Moraes 30'	Report	Bergson 38'; Hiltinho 46', 56'	Stadium: Estádio José do Rego Maciel (Arruda); Attendance: 28,279; Referee: Leandro Pedro Vuaden

24 October 2015 32	Náutico	1–4	Botafogo	São Lourenço da Mata
17:30 (UTC-3)	Daniel Morais 84'	Report	Sassá 36', 47', 79'; Diego Jardel 70'	Stadium: Estádio Governador Carlos Wilson Campos (Arena Pernambuco); Attendance: 14,561; Referee: Célio Amorim

31 October 2015 33	Vitória	2–3	Náutico	Salvador
17:10 (UTC-3)	Élton 12'; Rafaelson 83'	Report	Daniel Morais 46'; Bergson 53'; João Ananias 61'	Stadium: Estádio Manoel Barradas (Barradão); Attendance: 11,936; Referee: Rodrigo D Alonso Ferreira

7 November 2015 34	Náutico	2–0	Paraná	São Lourenço da Mata
17:30 (UTC-3)	Rafael Pereira 14'; Daniel Morais 27'	Report		Stadium: Estádio Governador Carlos Wilson Campos (Arena Pernambuco); Attendance: 8,818; Referee: Eduardo Tomaz de Aquino Valadão

10 November 2015 35	Macaé	1–1	Náutico	Macaé
19:00 (UTC-3)	Douglas 22'	Report	Ronaldo Alves 31'	Stadium: Estádio Cláudio Moacir de Azevedo (Moacyrzão); Attendance: 1,915; Referee: Rafael Traci

14 November 2015 36	Náutico	1–1	CRB	São Lourenço da Mata
17:30 (UTC-3)	Ronaldo Alves 38'	Report	Peri 24'	Stadium: Estádio Governador Carlos Wilson Campos (Arena Pernambuco); Attendance: 8,006; Referee: Francisco de Paula dos Santos Silva Neto

21 November 2015 37	Náutico	1–0	Bahia	São Lourenço da Mata
17:30 (UTC-3)	Fabiano Eller 17'	Report		Stadium: Estádio Governador Carlos Wilson Campos (Arena Pernambuco); Attendance: 1,666; Referee: Wagner do Nascimento Magalhaes

28 November 2015 38	Bragantino	0–2	Náutico	Bragança Paulista
17:30 (UTC-3)		Report	Daniel Morais 10'; Guilherme Biteco 90+3'	Stadium: Estádio Nabi Abi Chedid; Attendance: 10,108; Referee: Alexandre Vargas Tavares de Jesus

==== Record ====
Final Position	Points	Matches	Wins	Draws	Losses	Goals For	Goals Away	Avg%
5th	63	38	18	9	11	49	42	55%
