= 2021 Campeonato Paraense finals =

- Event: 2021 Campeonato Paraense
Tuna Luso	Paysandu
5	6
- on aggregate

First leg
Tuna Luso	Paysandu
4	2
- Date: 16 May 2021
- Venue: Estádio Francisco Vasques, Belém
- Referee: Dewson Fernando Freitas da Silva
- Attendance: 0

Second leg
Paysandu	Tuna Luso
4	1
- Date: 23 May 2021
- Venue: Estádio da Curuzu, Belém
- Referee: Marco José Soares de Almeida
- Attendance: 0

The 2021 Campeonato Paraense finals was the final that decided the 2021 Campeonato Paraense, the 109th season of the Campeonato Paraense. The final were contested between Tuna Luso and Paysandu.

Paysandu defeated Tuna Luso 6–5 on aggregate to win their 49th Campeonato Paraense title.

== Road to the final ==
Note: In all scores below, the score of the home team is given first.

Tuna Luso			Round	Paysandu		
Opponent	Venue	Score		Opponent	Venue	Score
Group B			Group stage	Group A		
Pos / Team / Pld / Pts; 1 / Remo (A) / 8 / 20; 2 / Tuna Luso (A) / 8 / 12; 3 / Tapajós / 8 / 7; 4 / Carajás (R) / 8 / 5; Source: Globo Esporte (A) Advance to a further round; (R) Relegated			Group stage	Pos / Team / Pld / Pts; 1 / Paysandu (A) / 8 / 19; 2 / Itupiranga (A) / 8 / 11; 3 / Bragantino (A) / 8 / 8; 4 / Gavião Kyikatejê (R) / 8 / 3; Source: Globo Esporte (A) Advance to a further round; (R) Relegated		
Itupiranga (won 3–1 on aggregate)	Away	0–3	Quarter-finals	Bragantino (won 1–0 on aggregate)	Away	0–0
Itupiranga (won 3–1 on aggregate)	Home	0–1	Quarter-finals	Bragantino (won 1–0 on aggregate)	Home	1–0
Remo (tied 2–2 on aggregate, won 6–5 on penalties)	Home	1–1	Semi-finals	Castanhal (tied 1–1 on aggregate, won 4–2 on penalties)	Away	0–0
Remo (tied 2–2 on aggregate, won 6–5 on penalties)	Away	1–1	Semi-finals	Castanhal (tied 1–1 on aggregate, won 4–2 on penalties)	Home	1–1

== Format ==
The finals were played on a home-and-away two-legged basis. If tied on aggregate, the penalty shoot-out was used to determine the winner.

== Matches ==
=== First leg ===
16 May 2021
10:00 UTC−3

Tuna Luso	4–2	Paysandu
Léo Rosa 13'; Alexandre Pinho 21'; Lukinha 62'; Paulo Rangel 85'	Report	Perema 79'; Gabriel Barbosa 87'

Estádio Francisco Vasques, Belém
Attendance: 0
Referee: Dewson Fernando Freitas da Silva

Tuna Luso	Paysandu

GK	1	(Brazil) Gabriel Bubniack
DF	2	(Brazil) Léo Rosa		(substituted off) 88'
DF	3	(Brazil) Dedé
DF	4	(Brazil) Renan
DF	6	(Brazil) Alexandre Pinho		(substituted off) 69'
MF	5	(Brazil) Arthur
MF	8	(Brazil) Kauê
MF	10	(Brazil) Lukinha	(yellow card) 58'	(substituted off) 88'
FW	7	(Brazil) Neto		(substituted off) 69'
FW	11	(Brazil) Fabinho		(substituted off) 76'
FW	9	(Brazil) Paulo Rangel (c)
Substitutes:
GK	12	(Brazil) Evandro Gigante
DF	13	(Brazil) Felipe		(substituted in) 88'
DF	14	(Brazil) Igor
MF	15	(Brazil) Alysson		(substituted in) 88'
MF	16	(Brazil) Marcus Vinícius		(substituted in) 69'
MF	17	(Brazil) Lineker
FW	18	(Brazil) Bambelo		(substituted in) 76'
FW	19	(Brazil) Luam Quintas
FW	20	(Brazil) Pedrinho		(substituted in) 69'
FW	21	(Brazil) Bica
FW	22	(Brazil) Breno
Coach:
(Brazil) Robson Melo

GK	1	(Brazil) Victor Souza
DF	93	(Brazil) Israel		(yellow card) 52'
DF	26	(Brazil) Perema
DF	34	(Brazil) Yan
DF	5	(Brazil) Bruno Collaço		(substituted off) 82'
MF	6	(Brazil) Paulinho	(yellow card) 58'	(substituted off) 69'
MF	21	(Brazil) Jhonnatan		(substituted off) 46'
MF	18	(Brazil) Ratinho
FW	10	(Brazil) Marlon		(substituted off) 46'
FW	97	(Brazil) Ari Moura		(substituted off) 78'
FW	11	(Brazil) Nicolas (c)
Substitutes:
GK	23	(Brazil) Paulo Ricardo
DF	3	(Brazil) Alisson
DF	36	(Brazil) Diego Matos		(substituted in) 82'
DF	53	(Brazil) Adriel
MF	8	(Brazil) Elyeser
MF	20	(Brazil) Rikelton
MF	22	(Brazil) Yure
MF	89	(Brazil) Ruy		(substituted in) 46'
FW	9	(Brazil) Gabriel Barbosa		(substituted in) 69'
FW	19	(Brazil) Igor Goularte		(substituted in) 78'
FW	77	(Brazil) Laércio
FW	98	(Brazil) Robinho		(substituted in) 46'
Coach:
(Brazil) Itamar Schülle

Assistant referees:
Hélcio Araújo Neves (Pará)
Márcio Gleidson Correia Dias (Pará)
Fourth official:
Nadílson Sousa dos Santos (Pará)
Fifth official:
Fábio Ferreira Amaral (Pará)

=== Second leg ===
23 May 2021
17:00 UTC−3

Paysandu	4–1	Tuna Luso
Igor Goularte 14'; Gabriel Barbosa 64', 75', 79'	Report	Paulo Rangel 6' (pen.)

Estádio da Curuzu, Belém
Attendance: 0
Referee: Marco José Soares de Almeida

Paysandu	Tuna Luso

GK	1	(Brazil) Victor Souza
DF	93	(Brazil) Israel
DF	3	(Brazil) Alisson
DF	26	(Brazil) Perema (c)	(yellow card) 90+5'	(red card) 90+7'
DF	5	(Brazil) Bruno Collaço		(yellow card) 40'
MF	42	(Brazil) Denílson		(substituted off) 46'
MF	6	(Brazil) Paulinho	(red card) 90+2'	(substituted off) 58'
MF	18	(Brazil) Ratinho		(yellow card) 60'
FW	10	(Brazil) Marlon		(substituted off) 58'
FW	19	(Brazil) Igor Goularte	(red card) 81'	(substituted off) 62'
FW	11	(Brazil) Nicolas	(yellow card) 4'	(substituted off) 90+8'
Substitutes:
DF	34	(Brazil) Yan		(substituted in) 90+8'
MF	21	(Brazil) Jhonnatan	(yellow card) 86'	(substituted in) 58'
FW	9	(Brazil) Gabriel Barbosa	(yellow card) 81'	(substituted in) 62'
FW	97	(Brazil) Ari Moura		(substituted in) 58'
FW	98	(Brazil) Robinho		(substituted in) 46'
Interim Coach:
(Brazil) Wilton Bezerra

GK	1	(Brazil) Gabriel Bubniack
DF	2	(Brazil) Léo Rosa (c)
DF	3	(Brazil) Dedé
DF	4	(Brazil) Renan		(yellow card) 24'
DF	6	(Brazil) Alexandre Pinho		(substituted off) 69'
MF	5	(Brazil) Arthur		(substituted off) 82'
MF	8	(Brazil) Kauê		(substituted off) 56'
MF	10	(Brazil) Lukinha		(red card) 90+2'
FW	7	(Brazil) Neto		(yellow card) 8' (yellow-red card) 45+6'
FW	11	(Brazil) Fabinho	(yellow card) 40'	(substituted off) 56'
FW	9	(Brazil) Paulo Rangel		(substituted off) 82'
Substitutes:
DF	14	(Brazil) Felipe		(substituted in) 69'
MF	17	(Brazil) Wellington Pará	(yellow card) 86'	(substituted in) 56'
MF	20	(Brazil) Lineker		(substituted in) 82'
FW	21	(Brazil) Jayme		(substituted in) 82'
FW	22	(Brazil) Pedrinho		(substituted in) 56'
Coach:
(Brazil) Robson Melo

Assistant referees:
Bárbara Roberta da Costa Loiola (Pará)
Jhonathan Leone Lopes (Pará)
Fourth official:
Joelson Silva dos Santos (Pará)
Fifth official:
Elaine da Silva Melo (Pará)

== See also ==
- 2022 Copa Verde
- 2022 Copa do Brasil
