= João Ananias =

João Ananias may refer to:

- João Ananias (footballer, born 1991), Brazilian football midfielder
- João Ananias (footballer, born 2007), Brazilian football defender
