= Alex Alves =

Alex Alves may refer to:

- Alex Alves (footballer, 1974–2012), Brazilian football striker
- Alex Alves (footballer, born 1975), Brazilian football manager and former striker
- Alex Alves (footballer, born 1981), Brazilian football midfielder
- Alex Alves (footballer, born 1986), Brazilian football goalkeeper
- Alex Alves (footballer, born 1992), Brazilian football defender
