= Fábio Alves da Silva =

Fábio Alves da Silva is the name of:

- Fábio Alves (footballer, born 1988), Brazilian footballer
- Fábio Bilica (born 1979), Brazilian footballer
