= Sueliton (footballer, born 1986) =

Brazilian footballer

Personal information
- Full name: Sueliton Pereira de Aguiar
- Date of birth: 19 August 1986 (age 40)
- Place of birth: Vitória de Santo Antão, Brazil
- Height: 1.78 m (5 ft 10 in)
- Position: Right-back

Team information
- Current team: Paraná

Youth career
- 2003: Vitória das Tabocas
- 2004–2007: Porto-PE
- 2008: 7 de Setembro
- 2009: Sergipe
- 2009: Porto-PE
- 2010: Vitória das Tabocas

Senior career*
Years	Team	Apps	(Gls)
2010	ABC	6	(0)
2011	São José	13	(2)
2011–2012	Rayo Vallecano	0	(0)
2013	Criciúma	27	(2)
2014	Atlético Paranaense	30	(0)
2015	Joinville	6	(0)
2015	Figueirense	10	(0)
2016	Goiás	15	(0)
2017	Náutico	12	(1)
2018	Mirassol	0	(0)
2018	Criciúma	23	(0)
2019–	Paraná	0	(0)
- * Club domestic league appearances and goals as of 24 March 2019

Sueliton Pereira de Aguiar or simply Sueliton (born 19 August 1986), is a Brazilian professional footballer who plays for Paraná Clube as a right-back.

== Career ==
=== Early career ===
Born in Vitória de Santo Antão, Pernambuco, Sueliton began his career with Vitória das Tabocas. He then joined Pernambuco state club Porto-PE, remaining at the club for four years. The following seasons he played for 7 de Setembro, and Sergipe CS before returning to Porto during the 2009 season. The following season he re-joined Vitória das Tabocas before moving to Serie C club ABC Futebol Clube.

=== São José ===
For the 2011 season Sueliton moved to Campeonato Gaúcho side São José EC and quickly established himself as one of the top right backs in the league. In his one season with the club, he appeared in 13 matches and scored 2 goals, being selected as the best right back of the competition.

=== Rayo Vallecano ===
On 2 June 2011, it was announced that Sueliton was joining newly promoted La Liga side Rayo Vallecano as the club's first signing for the upcoming First Division season. However, he failed to appear in any league matches for the Madrid outfit, and rescinded his link on 20 December 2012.

=== Criciúma ===
On 17 January 2013, Sueliton joined Criciúma EC. After appearing regularly during the Campeonato Catarinense (with his side finishing first), he made his Série A debut on 7 July, starting in a 3–2 away loss against Atlético Mineiro.

Sueliton scored his first goal in the main category of Brazilian football on 18 August, but in a 2–1 loss at Atlético Paranaense. He finished the campaign with 27 appearances and two goals, as his side narrowly avoided relegation.

=== Atlético Paranaense ===
On 20 January 2014, Sueliton signed for Atlético Paranaense. He easily beat competition of fellow newcomer Lucas Olaza, and appeared in 30 matches during the season.

== Honours ==
ABC

- Campeonato Brasileiro Série C: 2010

Criciúma

- Campeonato Catarinense: 2013

Goiás

- Campeonato Goiano: 2016
