= Igor Goularte =

Brazilian football player (born 1996)

Personal information
- Full name: Igor Leandro Goularte do Nascimento
- Date of birth: 8 July 1996 (age 30)
- Place of birth: Rio de Janeiro, Brazil
- Position: Forward

Team information
- Current team: Caxias-RS

Senior career*
Years	Team	Apps	(Gls)
2016	Itaboraí	5	(0)
2017	Correcaminos UAT	7	(0)
2018-2020	Atlético Acreano	9	(0)
2019	→ Luverdense (loan)	12	(0)
2019	→ Avaí (loan)	7	(0)
2020	→ ABC FC (loan)	11	(1)
2020	Estoril U23	1	(0)
2020	Novorizontino	5	(0)
2021	Paysandu	2	(0)
2021-2022	River Plate Asunción	10	(0)
2022	Hercílio-Luz-SC	12	(0)
2022-	Caxias-RS	0	(0)
- * Club domestic league appearances and goals as of 15:28, 21 April 2022 (UTC)

Igor Leandro Goularte do Nascimento (born 8 July 1996) is a Brazilian professional footballer who plays as a forward for Caxias-RS.

== Career ==
In June 2021, ABC Color announced that Goularte became River Plate Asunción's 15th signing.
