= Hugo Cabral =

Brazilian footballer (born 1988)

Personal information
- Full name: Hugo da Silva Cabral
- Date of birth: 6 September 1988 (age 38)
- Place of birth: São João de Meriti, Brazil
- Height: 1.79 m (5 ft 10 in)
- Position: Forward

Team information
- Current team: Santa Cruz

Senior career*
Years	Team	Apps	(Gls)
2009	Miguel Couto		
2010	Olaria	2	(0)
2010–2011	América-RJ	6	(1)
2011–2012	Macaé	2	(0)
2012	Americano	14	(2)
2012	Vitória da Conquista	3	(0)
2012	Ceará	4	(0)
2012–2013	Bangu	13	(1)
2013–2014	Náutico	18	(2)
2014	Bahia	0	(0)
2014	→ Joinville (loan)	8	(1)
2014–2015	Volta Redonda	15	(6)
2015	Avaí	7	(2)
2015	Criciúma	9	(1)
2015–2016	Tombense	0	(0)
2016	→ São Bernardo (loan)	0	(0)
2016	→ Volta Redonda (loan)	11	(1)
2016–2017	Luverdense	26	(9)
2017	Audax	9	(0)
2017	América Mineiro	20	(0)
2018	Santo André	11	(3)
2018	CSA	27	(4)
2018–2019	Tombense	0	(0)
2019	→ Ponte Preta (loan)	12	(3)
2019	Cuiabá	9	(0)
2020	Ituano	2	(0)
2020–2021	Ermis Aradippou	3	(0)
2021	Portuguesa-RJ	6	(0)
2021–2022	Al-Okhdood	9	(0)
2022	Volta Redonda	8	(0)
2022-	Santa Cruz	10	(7)
- * Club domestic league appearances and goals as of 20:13, 26 May 2022 (UTC)

Hugo da Silva Cabral (born 6 September 1988), sometimes known as just Hugo, is a Brazilian footballer who plays as a forward for Santa Cruz.

== Career ==
On 2 January 2019, Ponte Preta announced that they had signed Cabral on loan from Tombense.
