= Assis Chateaubriand, Paraná =

Coordinates: 24°30′S 50°24′W

Assis Chateaubriand
- Municipality
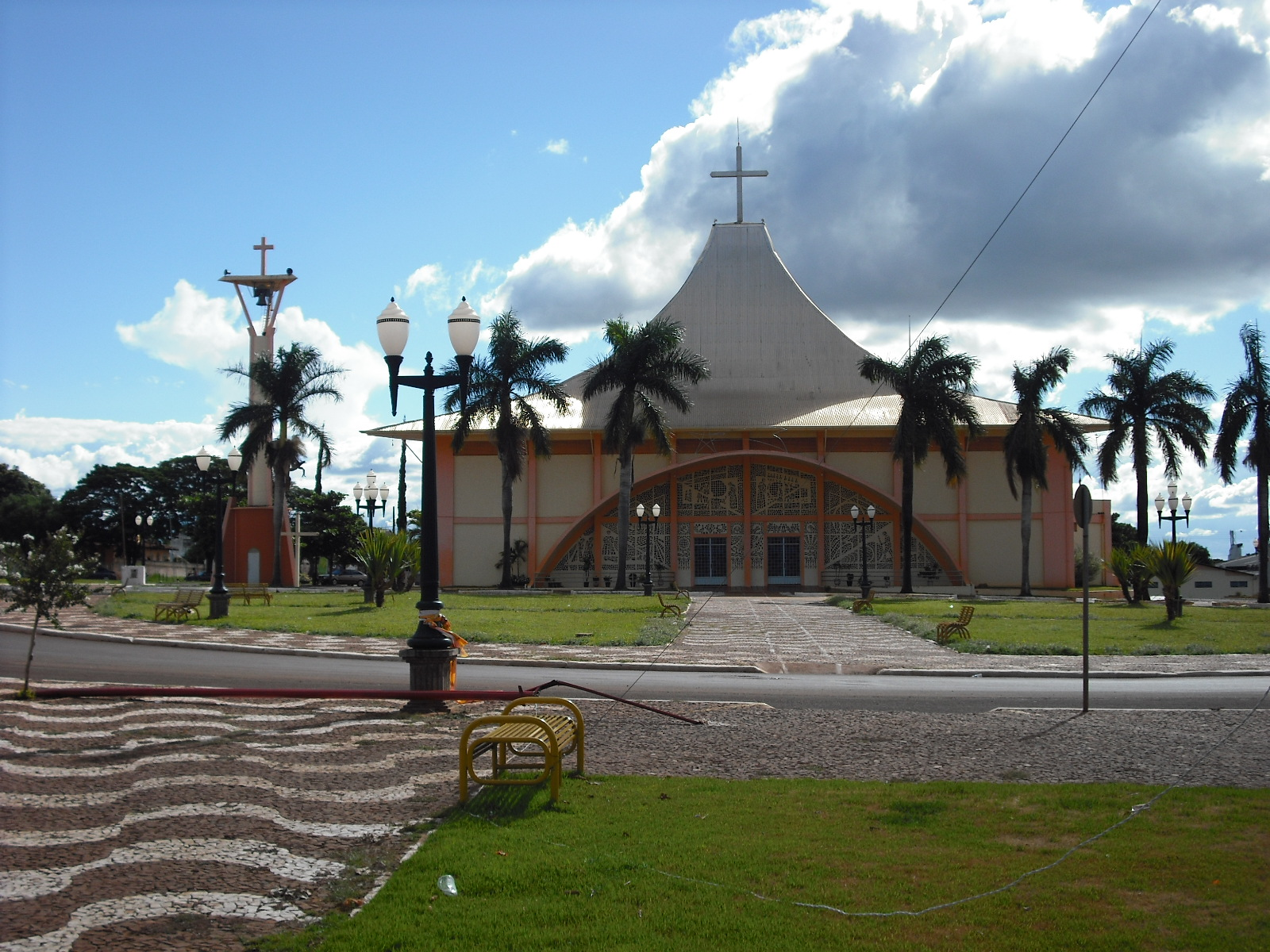
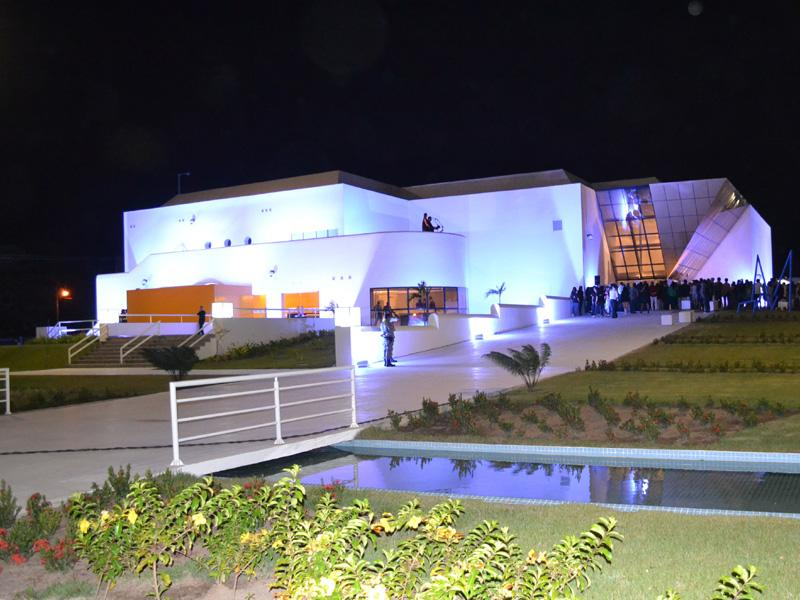
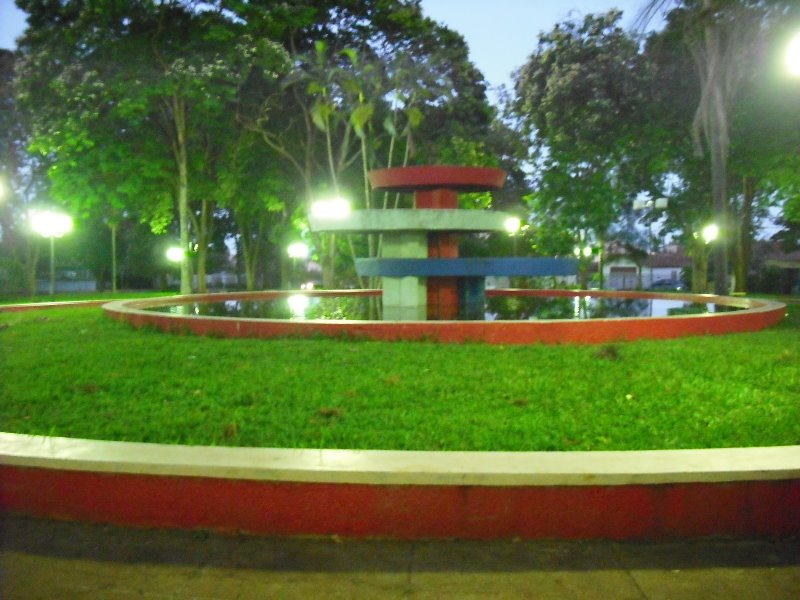
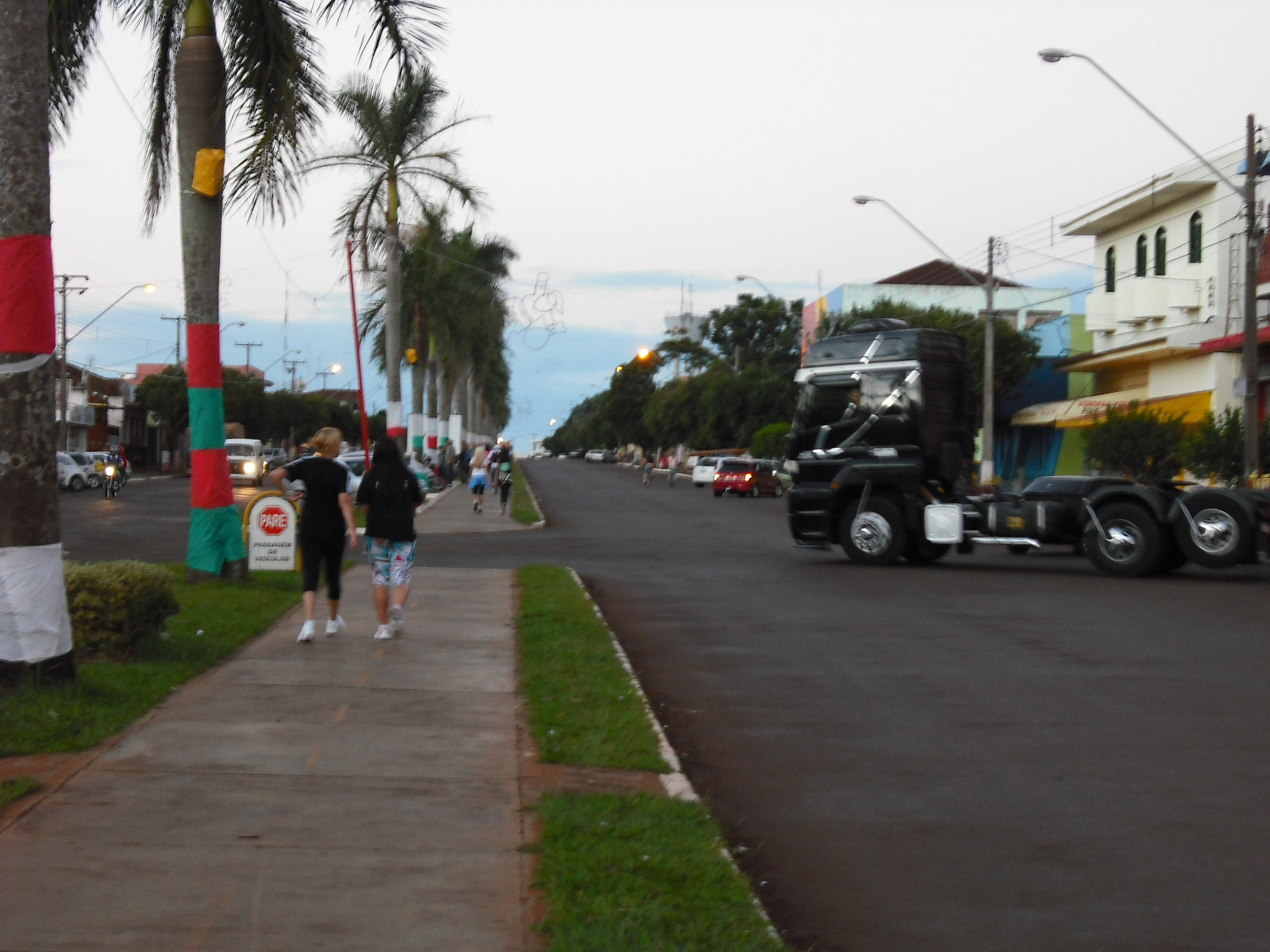

- Flag Coat of arms
- Interactive map of Assis Chateaubriand
- Country: Brazil
- Region: Southern
- State: Paraná
- Mesoregion: Oeste Paranaense

Area
  - Total: 969.59 km^{2} (374.36 sq mi)

Population (2020)
  - Total: 33,340
  - Density: 34.39/km^{2} (89.06/sq mi)
- Time zone: UTC−3 (BRT)
- Area code: +5544

Assis Chateaubriand is a municipality in the state of Paraná in the Southern Region of Brazil.

== Sister cities ==
Assis Chateaubriand is twinned with:

- Seixal, Lisboa Region, Portugal
- Shibata, Miyagi, Japan

== See also ==
- List of municipalities in Paraná
