= Rafael Furtado =

Brazilian footballer (born 1999)

Personal information
- Full name: Rafael Victor de Oliveira Furtado
- Date of birth: 9 December 1999 (age 26)
- Place of birth: Taubaté, Brazil
- Height: 1.80 m (5 ft 11 in)
- Position: Forward

Team information
- Current team: Volta Redonda
- Number: 28

Youth career
- Paraná

Senior career*
Years	Team	Apps	(Gls)
2016–2020	Paraná	17	(0)
2017	→ Atlético Mineiro (loan)	0	(0)
2020–2021	Académica	14	(1)
2021–2022	Boston City		
2022	Santa Cruz	26	(7)
2023	Sampaio Corrêa	5	(1)
2023	Juventude	4	(0)
2024	Confiança	20	(4)
2024	Krumovgrad	15	(1)
2025	SC Sagamihara	24	(7)
2026–	Volta Redonda	7	(0)
- * Club domestic league appearances and goals as of 11 November 2026

Rafael Victor de Oliveira Furtado (born 9 December 1999), known simply as Rafael Furtado, is a Brazilian professional footballer who plays as a forward for Volta Redonda.

== Career ==
Born in Taubaté, Brazil, Furtado joined Académica in the Liga Portugal 2 on 8 August 2020, arriving from Paraná Clube. He made his professional debut at 20 September, in a home win against Estoril Praia.

On 21 January 2025, Furtado was abroad to Japan for the first time and signed to J3 club, SC Sagamihara for 2025 season.
