= Marcílio (footballer, born 1995) =

Brazilian footballer

Personal information
- Full name: Marcílio da Silva Miguel
- Date of birth: 10 August 1995 (age 31)
- Place of birth: Natal, Brazil
- Height: 1.74 m (5 ft 9 in)
- Position: Left-back

Youth career
- 2013: ABC

Senior career*
Years	Team	Apps	(Gls)
2013–2015	ABC	29	(1)
2014	→ Botafogo-PB (loan)	0	(0)
2015–2016	Mirassol	6	(1)
2016–2019	Vitória Guimarães B	3	(0)
2017	→ Sporting Covilhã (loan)	11	(0)
2018	→ Guarani (loan)	7	(0)
2019	→ Renofa Yamaguchi (loan)	0	(0)
2020	Primavera	10	(0)
2021	ABC	14	(1)
2022	Manauara	9	(1)
2022	Boa Esporte	14	(2)
2022	Brasiliense	1	(0)
2022	Velo Clube	13	(0)
2023	CEOV Operário	3	(0)
2023	North EC	3	(0)
- * Club domestic league appearances and goals as of 19:33, 20 August 2023 (UTC)

Marcílio da Silva Miguel (born 10 August 1995), known as Marcílio, is a Brazilian football player.

== Club career ==
He made his professional debut in the Campeonato Brasileiro Série B for ABC on 28 May 2013 in a game against Sport Recife.
