= Valdivia (footballer, born 1992) =

Brazilian footballer

Caique Valdivia
Personal information
- Full name: Caique Ferreira da Silva Leite
- Date of birth: October 23, 1992 (age 34)
- Place of birth: Rio de Janeiro, Brazil
- Height: 1.80 m (5 ft 11 in)
- Position: Midfielder

Team information
- Current team: ASA

Youth career
- 2009–2011: ASA

Senior career*
Years	Team	Apps	(Gls)
2012–2015	ASA	65	(6)
2014	→ Seongnam FC (loan)	13	(1)
2015–2017	Cruzeiro	0	(0)
2015	→ Paysandu (loan)	15	(1)
2016	→ Náutico (loan)	15	(1)
2016–2017	→ Criciúma (loan)	44	(2)
2019–2020	Juventude	4	(0)
2020	Londrina	0	(0)
- * Club domestic league appearances and goals as of 10 March 2019

Caique Ferreira da Silva Leite (born October 23, 1992), or simply Caique Valdivia, is a Brazilian former professional footballer who played as a midfielder.

== Career ==
He moved to K League Classic side Seongnam FC on loan in 2014.
