= Bruno Mota (Brazilian footballer) =

Brazilian footballer (born 1995)

Personal information
- Full name: Bruno de Mota Miranda
- Date of birth: 22 May 1995 (age 31)
- Place of birth: Curitiba, Brazil
- Height: 1.87 m (6 ft 2 in)
- Position: Attacking midfielder

Team information
- Current team: São Caetano

Youth career
- Internacional
- 2010–2015: Atlético Paranaense

Senior career*
Years	Team	Apps	(Gls)
2015–2018	Atlético Paranaense	14	(2)
2016–2017	→ Gaziantepspor (loan)	4	(0)
2017	→ Náutico (loan)	15	(3)
2018	Neuchâtel Xamax	2	(1)
2018–2019	Kerkyra	21	(3)
2020	Portuguesa	6	(0)
2020	Treze	15	(1)
2021–2022	CSA	48	(10)
2022	→ Tombense (loan)	16	(0)
2023–	São Caetano	0	(0)
- * Club domestic league appearances and goals as of 20:48, 22 January 2023 (UTC)

Bruno da Mota Miranda (born 22 May 1995), known as Bruno Mota, is a Brazilian professional footballer who plays as an attacking midfielder for São Caetano.

== Career ==
Born in Curitiba, Paraná, Bruno Mota joined Atlético Paranaense's youth setup in 2010, after starting out at Internacional. He made his senior debut on 22 February 2015, coming on as a half-time substitute in a 2–0 away loss against Coritiba for the Campeonato Paranaense championship.

After being definitely promoted to the main squad in March, Bruno Mota made his Série A debut on 19 July 2015, starting in a 1–0 home win against Chapecoense. He scored his first goal in the category on 27 September, scoring his team's only in a 2–1 home loss against Ponte Preta.

== Honours ==
CSA

- Campeonato Alagoano: 2021
