= Kléver =

Brazilian footballer

Personal information
- Full name: Kléver Rodrigo Gomes Rufino
- Date of birth: 20 July 1989 (age 37)
- Place of birth: Mirassol, Brazil
- Height: 1.88 m (6 ft 2 in)
- Position: Goalkeeper

Team information
- Current team: Boavista

Youth career
- 2006–2011: Fluminense

Senior career*
Years	Team	Apps	(Gls)
2011–2015	Fluminense	8	(0)
2011	→ Volta Redonda (loan)	0	(0)
2016–2018	Atlético-GO	42	(0)
2019	Guarani	21	(0)
2020–2022	Santa Cruz	6	(0)
2023-	Boavista	2	(0)
- * Club domestic league appearances and goals as of 24 March 2019

Kléver Rodrigo Gomes Rufino (born 20 July 1989), simply known as Kléver, is a Brazilian footballer who plays for Boavista as a goalkeeper.

== Career ==
Born in Mirassol, São Paulo, Kléver joined Fluminense's youth system in 2006, aged 15. He made his senior debuts while on loan to Volta Redonda in 2011. In April, after returning to Flu, Kléver was definitely promoted to the main squad, but behind Ricardo Berna and Diego Cavalieri.

On 6 October 2013, after Berna's departure and Cavalieri's call-up to the national side, he was selected ahead of new signing Felipe and played his first match as a professional, starting in a 0–1 loss at Internacional.

== Honours ==
Fluminense

- Campeonato Brasileiro Série A: ´2012

Atlético Goianiense

- Campeonato Brasileiro Série B: 2016
