= Alex Alves (footballer, born 1992) =

Brazilian footballer

Personal information
- Full name: Alex Alves Cardoso
- Date of birth: 25 August 1992 (age 34)
- Place of birth: Assis Chateaubriand, Brazil
- Height: 1.83 m (6 ft 0 in)
- Position: Centre-back

Team information
- Current team: CEOV
- Number: 4

Youth career
- Paraná

Senior career*
Years	Team	Apps	(Gls)
2012–2014	Paraná	52	(4)
2014–2017	Goiás	93	(7)
2018–2019	Coritiba	25	(0)
2020–2021	Boa	23	(1)
2022	Santa Cruz	16	(0)
2023	Atlético Catarinense	9	(0)
2023–	CEOV	15	(2)
- * Club domestic league appearances and goals as of 5 August 2023

Alex Alves Cardoso (born 25 August 1992), known as Alex Alves, is a Brazilian footballer who plays for CEOV, mainly a central defender, he can also play as a defensive midfielder.

== Career ==
Born in Assis Chateaubriand, Paraná, Alex Alves graduated with Paraná Clube's youth setup. He made his professional debut on 19 May 2012, starting in a 1–1 home draw against Guarani for the Série B championship.

Alex Alves scored his first goal in the competition on 7 July, netting the first in a 2–0 home win against Boa Esporte. He finished the season with 32 appearances and four goals, as his side finished tenth.

On 7 February 2014, after being an ever-present figure for the Azulão, Alex Alves signed a three-year deal with Goiás. He made his Série A debut on 4 May, playing the full 90 minutes in a 1–0 away win against Atlético Mineiro.

Alex Alves scored his first goal in the main category of Brazilian football on 23 May 2014, netting his team's first in a 2–2 home draw against Santos.
