= Elyeser =

Brazilian footballer (born 1990)

Personal information
- Full name: Elyeser Maciel da Silva
- Date of birth: 25 June 1990 (age 36)
- Place of birth: Abaetetuba, Brazil
- Height: 5 ft 11 in (1.81 m)
- Position: Midfielder

Team information
- Current team: Paysandu
- Number: 8

Youth career
- Santos
- Mogi Mirim

Senior career*
Years	Team	Apps	(Gls)
2010–2011	Mogi Mirim	4	(0)
2011–2013	América (RN)		
2013–2017	CSA	21	(1)
2013	→ Guarani (loan)	4	(0)
2014	→ Paraná (loan)	7	(0)
2016	→ Glória (loan)	9	(0)
2016	→ Itabaiana (loan)	2	(0)
2017	→ Caxias (loan)	14	(2)
2017–2019	Goiás	31	(1)
2019	→ Coritiba (loan)	5	(0)
2020	Figueirense	20	(0)
2021-	Paysandu	0	(0)
- * Club domestic league appearances and goals as of 30 April 2019 ‡ National team caps and goals as of 30 April 2019

Elyeser (born 25 June 1990), is a Brazilian professional footballer who plays as a midfielder for Paysandu.
