= Rafael Pereira (footballer, born 1984) =

Brazilian footballer (born 1994)

Personal information
- Full name: Rafael Pereira dos Santos
- Date of birth: 18 November 1984 (age 41)
- Place of birth: Rio do Sul, Brazil
- Height: 1.83 m (6 ft 0 in)
- Position: Centre-back

Team information
- Current team: Ituano

Senior career*
Years	Team	Apps	(Gls)
2005	Chapecoense	10	(0)
2005	Operários Mafrenses	10	(2)
2006	Juventus Jaraguá	26	(1)
2006	São Carlos	13	(2)
2007–2010	Metropolitano	39	(4)
2007	→ Botafogo (loan)	2	(1)
2008–2009	→ Gaz Metan Mediaş (loan)	9	(0)
2010–2015	Juventude	86	(10)
2013	→ Sport Recife (loan)	9	(0)
2014–2015	→ Criciúma (loan)	31	(2)
2015–2016	Náutico	66	(7)
2017–2018	Ceará	57	(3)
2018–2019	Chapecoense	27	(4)
2020–2021	Avaí	48	(1)
2022–	Ituano	60	(0)
- * Club domestic league appearances and goals as of 03:55, 6 February 2022 (UTC)

Rafael Pereira dos Santos (born 18 November 1984 in Rio do Sul) is a ex Brazilian football player, Who played as a defender

== Honours ==
Ceará

- Campeonato Cearense: 2017, 2018

Avaí

- Campeonato Catarinense: 2021
