= Daniel Morais =

Brazilian footballer (born 1986)

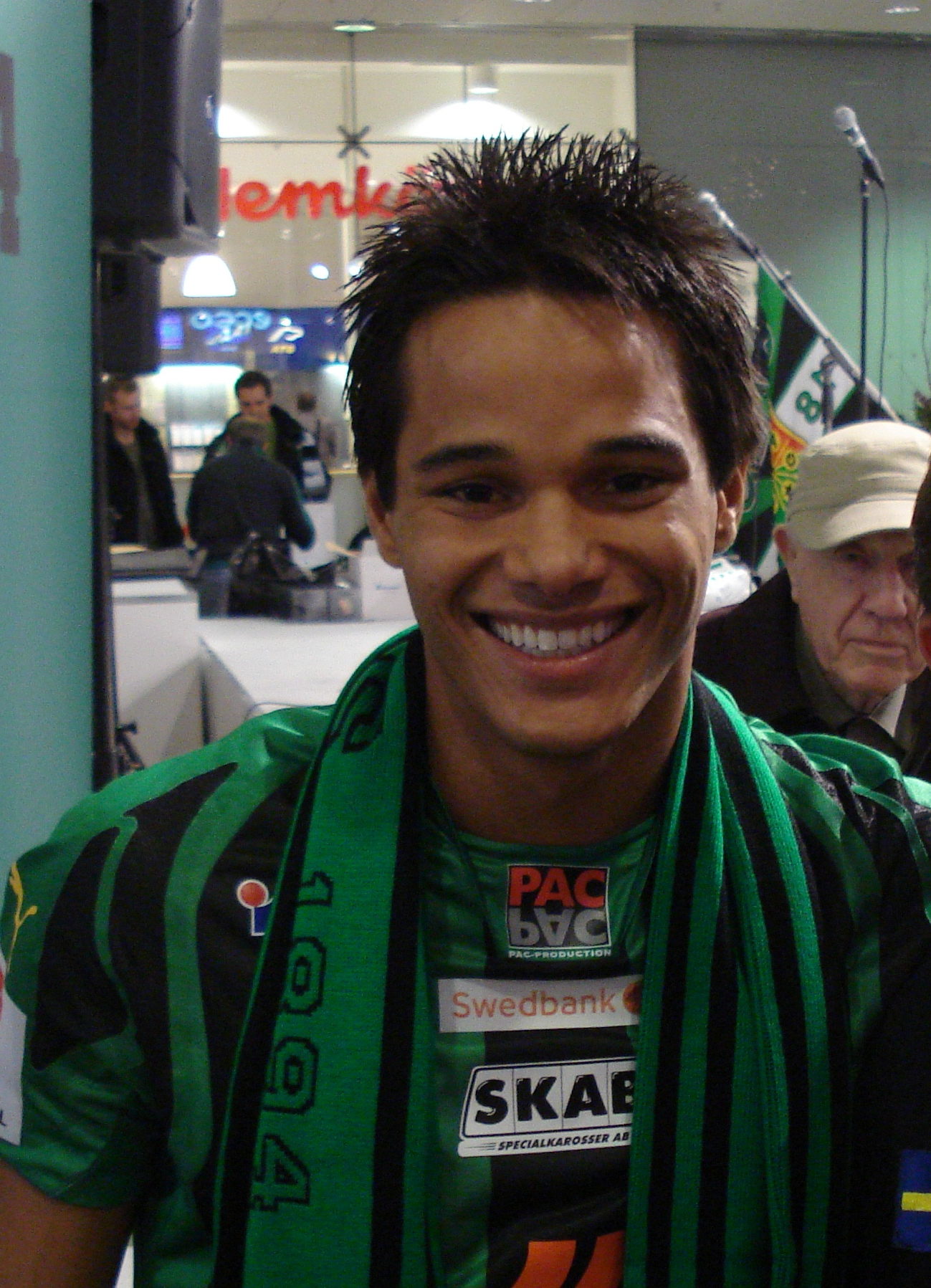
Reis in 2007

Daniel Morais Reis (born 12 May 1986) is a Brazilian former professional footballer who played as a forward.

== Career ==
Morais Reis joined Allsvenskan club GAIS in the beginning of 2008 from Belo Horizonte club América FC. He and the club agreed on terminating the contract in September 2009.

After the good passage for União Araxá, from Araxá, Brazil, in the first half of 2012, Morais Reis joined with Uberaba Sport, from Uberaba, to play on the Taça Minas championship. Uberaba won the Taça Minas championship three times. He scored four goals in the three last matches for Uberaba.
