= Cal (footballer) =

Brazilian footballer (born 1996)

Personal information
- Full name: Carlos Alberto Matos Rodrigues
- Date of birth: 14 March 1996 (age 30)
- Place of birth: Recife, Brazil
- Height: 1.80 m (5 ft 11 in)
- Position: Midfielder

Team information
- Current team: Enosis
- Number: 21

Senior career*
Years	Team	Apps	(Gls)
2016–2018	Náutico	14	(0)
2019	Ferroviário	0	(0)
2019–	Enosis	6	(0)
- * Club domestic league appearances and goals as of 14:44, 14 June 2020 (UTC)

Carlos Alberto Matos Rodrigues (born 14 March 1996), commonly known as Cal, is a Brazilian footballer who currently plays as a midfielder for Enosis.

== Career statistics ==
=== Club ===
As of 7 December 2019.

Club	Season	League			State League		Cup		Continental		Other		Total	
Club	Season	Division	Apps	Goals	Apps	Goals	Apps	Goals	Apps	Goals	Apps	Goals	Apps	Goals
Náutico	2016	Série B	2	0	1 (Note: Appearances in the Campeonato Pernambucano)	0	0	0	–		0	0	3	0
Náutico	2017	Série B	12	0	8	0	1 (Note: Appearances in the Copa do Brasil)	0	–		3 (Note: Appearances in the Copa do Nordeste)	0	24	0
Náutico	2018	Série C	0	0	3	0	1	0	–		1	0	5	0
Náutico	Total		14	0	12	0	2	0	0	0	4	0	32	0
Ferroviário	2019	Série C	0	0	6 (Note: Appearances in the Campeonato Cearense)	0	0	0	–		0	0	6	0
Enosis	2019–20	Cypriot First Division	4	0	–		0	0	–		0	0	4	0
Career total			18	0	18	0	2	0	0	0	4	0	42	0
