= Alison (footballer, born 1995) =

Brazilian footballer

Personal information
- Full name: Alison Henrique Mira
- Date of birth: 1 December 1995 (age 30)
- Place of birth: Santa Cruz do Rio Pardo, Brazil
- Height: 1.82 m (6 ft 0 in)
- Position: Forward

Team information
- Current team: Cascavel

Youth career
- São Caetano

Senior career*
Years	Team	Apps	(Gls)
2014	São Caetano	7	(4)
2015	Shonan Bellmare	12	(2)
2016	Atlético Goianiense	31	(7)
2017	Náutico	21	(1)
2017	→ Mirassol (loan)	0	(0)
2017	→ Atlético Goianiense (loan)	7	(0)
2018	Mirassol	18	(5)
2018	Sampaio Corrêa	4	(0)
2019	Votuporanguense	8	(0)
2019	Atlético Tubarão	0	(0)
2020	Novo Hamburgo	8	(0)
2020	Manaus	0	(0)
2020–2021	Joinville	25	(9)
2021	→ Floresta (loan)	20	(2)
2022	Flamengo-BA	7	(0)
2022	Pouso Alegre	8	(0)
2023	Nova Venécia	6	(4)
2023	Anápolis	14	(3)
2023	XV Piracicaba		
2023–	Cascavel	9	(0)
- * Club domestic league appearances and goals as of 00:59, 19 February 2024 (UTC)

Alison Henrique Mira (born 1 December 1995, in Santa Cruz do Rio Pardo), simply known as Alison, is a Brazilian footballer who plays as a forward for Cascavel.

== Career ==
=== São Caetano ===
Alison made his league debut for São Caetano against Caxias do Sul on the 24 August 2014. He scored his first league goal against Guarani SP on 10 August 2014, scoring in the 42nd minute.

=== Shonan Bellmare ===
Alison scored on his league debut for Shonan against Kashima Antlers on 14 March 2015, scoring in the 90th+2nd minute.

=== Atlético Goianiense ===
Alison made his league debut for Atlético Goianiense against Itumbiara on 6 February 2016. He scored his first goal for the club against Goianésia on 3 April 2016, scoring in the 41st minute.

=== Náutico ===
Alison made his league debut for Náutico against Santa Cruz on 4 February 2017. He scored his first goal for the club against Santa Cruz on 6 May 2017, scoring in the 78th minute.

=== Mirassol ===
Alison made his league debut for Mirassol against Novorizontino on 17 January 2018. He scored his first goal for the club against Linense on 11 March 2018, scoring in the 88th minute.

=== Sampaio Corrêa ===
Alison made his league debut for Sampaio Corrêa against Coritiba on 11 August 2018.

=== Votuporanguense ===
Alison made his league debut for Votuporanguense against Santo André on 9 February 2019.

=== Novo Hamburgo ===
Alison made his league debut for Novo Hamburgo against Pelotas on 22 January 2020.

=== Joinville ===
Alison made his league debut for Joinville against Novorizontino on 19 September 2020. He scored his first goal for the club against Caxias do Sul on 10 October 2020, scoring a penalty in the 39th minute.

=== Floresta ===
Alison made his league debut for Floresta against EC Jacuipense on 29 May 2021. He scored his first goal for the club against Ferroviário on 24 July 2021, scoring in the 50th minute.

=== Pouso Alegre ===
Alison made his league debut for Pouso Alegre against Real Noroeste on 16 July 2022. He scored his first goal for the club against Paraná on 13 August 2022, scoring in the 39th minute.

=== Anápolis ===
Alison made his league debut for Anápolis against CEOV Operário on 27 May 2023. He scored his first goal for the club against Interporto on 10 June 2023, scoring in the 85th minute.

=== Cascavel ===
Alison made his league debut for Cascavel against Azuriz on 18 January 2024.

== Career statistics ==
As of 16 September 2017

Club	Season	League			State League		Cup		Continental		Other		Total	
Club	Season	Division	Apps	Goals	Apps	Goals	Apps	Goals	Apps	Goals	Apps	Goals	Apps	Goals
São Caetano	2013	Série B	0	0	0	0	0	0	—		9 (Note: Appearance(s) in Copa Paulista)	1	9	1
São Caetano	2014	Série C	7	4	0	0	—		—		—		7	4
São Caetano	Subtotal		7	4	0	0	0	0	—		9	1	16	5
Shonan Bellmare	2015	J1 League	12	2	—		2	0	—		—		14	2
Atlético Goianiense	2016	Série B	21	6	10	1	2	0	—		—		33	7
Náutico	2017	Série B	10	0	11	1	1	0	—		5 (Note: Appearance(s) in Copa do Nordeste)	0	27	1
Mirassol (loan)	2017	Paulista	—		—		—		—		2	0	2	0
Atlético Goianiense (loan)	2017	Série A	1	0	—		—		—		—		1	0
Career total			41	12	21	2	5	0	0	0	11	1	78	15

== Honours ==
Atlético Goianiense

- Campeonato Brasileiro Série B: 2016
