= Jefferson Nem =

Brazilian footballer

Personal information
- Full name: Jefferson Vasconcelos Braz da Silva
- Date of birth: 10 April 1996 (age 30)
- Place of birth: Jaboatão dos Guararapes, Brazil
- Height: 1.66 m (5 ft 5 in)
- Position: Forward

Team information
- Current team: Botafogo-SP
- Number: 11

Youth career
- Náutico

Senior career*
Years	Team	Apps	(Gls)
2013–2017	Náutico	59	(8)
2017	→ Atlético Goianiense (loan)	4	(0)
2018–2020	Estoril	0	(0)
2018	→ Real Massamá (loan)	14	(4)
2018–2019	→ Guarani (loan)	15	(1)
2019–2020	→ Náutico (loan)	10	(0)
2020–2021	Alverca	74	(7)
2023–2024	Lusitânia	29	(7)
2024	Nanjing City	14	(1)
2025	Velo Clube	12	(2)
2025–	Botafogo-SP	56	(3)
- * Club domestic league appearances and goals as of 15 April 2026

Jefferson Vasconcelos Braz da Silva (born 10 April 1996), known as Jefferson Nem, is a Brazilian professional footballer who plays as a forward for Botafogo-SP.

== Career ==
Born in Jaboatão dos Guararapes, Pernambuco, Jefferson Nem began his career with Náutico. He made his first team debut at the age of 16 on 26 January 2013, coming on as a late substitute in a 3–1 Campeonato Pernambucano home win over Ypiranga-PE.

Back to the under-20 squad, Jefferson Nem only started to feature regularly with the main squad in 2016. On 30 June 2017, he was loaned to Atlético Goianiense, and made his Série A debut on 12 November, replacing Andrigo in a 2–0 home win over Sport Recife.

In January 2018, Jefferson Nem moved abroad and joined Estoril, but was loaned to Real Massamá. On 16 August, he was presented at Guarani.

Back to Timbu on loan in July 2019, Jefferson Nem featured rarely before leaving in April 2020, and subsequently moved to Alverca in June.

In July 2023, Jefferson Nem agreed to a deal with Liga 3 side Lusitânia. After scoring eight goals for the side, he moved to China League One side Nanjing City on 9 July 2024.

On 4 January 2025, Jefferson Nem returned to his home country after five years, after being announced at Velo Clube.

== Career statistics ==
As of 5 February 2025

Club	Season	League			State League		Cup		Continental		Other		Total	
Club	Season	Division	Apps	Goals	Apps	Goals	Apps	Goals	Apps	Goals	Apps	Goals	Apps	Goals
Náutico	2013	Série A	0	0	1	0	—		—		—		1	0
Náutico	2015	Série B	2	0	6	0	2	0	—		3 (Note: Appearance(s) in Copa do Nordeste)	0	13	0
Náutico	2016	Série B	28	7	3	1	1	0	—		—		32	8
Náutico	2017	Série B	4	0	5	0	1	0	—		4	2	14	2
Náutico	Total		34	7	15	1	4	0	—		7	2	60	10
Atlético Goianiense (loan)	2017	Série A	4	0	—		—		—		—		4	0
Real Massamá	2017–18	LigaPro	14	4	—		—		—		—		14	4
Guarani	2018	Série B	12	1	—		—		—		—		12	1
Guarani	2019	Série B	0	0	3	0	0	0	—		—		3	0
Guarani	Total		12	1	3	0	0	0	—		—		15	1
Náutico	2019	Série C	6	0	—		—		—		—		6	0
Náutico	2020	Série B	0	0	4	0	0	0	—		3	0	7	0
Náutico	Total		6	0	4	0	0	0	—		3	0	13	0
Alverca	2020–21	Campeonato de Portugal	22	2	—		2	0	—		—		24	2
Alverca	2021–22	Liga 3	27	4	—		4	2	—		2 (Note: Appearance(s) in promotion series)	0	33	6
Alverca	2022–23	Liga 3	25	1	—		2	0	—		—		27	1
Alverca	Total	Liga 3	74	7	—		8	2	—		2	0	84	9
Lusitânia	2023–24	Liga 3	29	7	—		—		—		2	1	31	8
Nanjing City	2024	China League One	14	1	—		2	0	—		—		16	1
Velo Clube	2025	Paulista	—		7	1	—		—		—		7	1
Career total			187	29	29	2	14	2	0	0	14	3	244	36

== Honours ==
Náutico

- Campeonato Brasileiro Série C: 2019
