= Esquerdinha (footballer, born 1989) =

Brazilian footballer

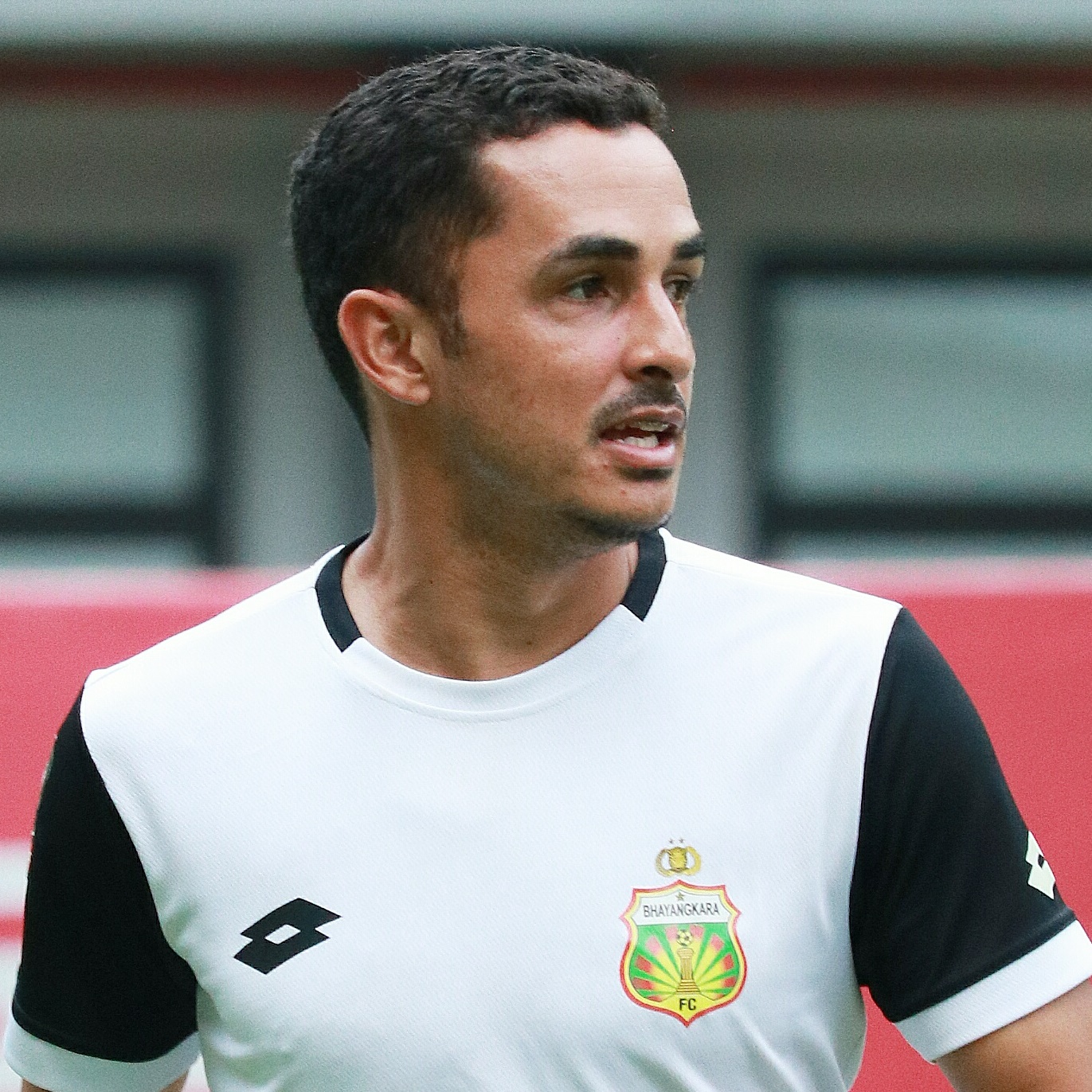

Personal information
- Full name: Rubens Raimundo da Silva
- Date of birth: 10 October 1989 (age 37)
- Place of birth: Recife, Brazil
- Height: 1.76 m (5 ft 9 in)
- Position: Attacking midfielder

Team information
- Current team: Santa Cruz

Youth career
- Santa Cruz

Senior career*
Years	Team	Apps	(Gls)
2008–2009	Santa Cruz	9	(0)
2008	→ Icasa (loan)		
2009	→ Centro Limoeirense (loan)		
2010	Bragantino	7	(1)
2010–2012	Ituano	0	(0)
2011	Caldense	0	(0)
2011	Boa Esporte	4	(0)
2012	Chapecoense	8	(0)
2012–2013	ABC	2	(0)
2013	Red Bull Brasil	0	(0)
2013	Ituano	0	(0)
2014–2015	Goiás	30	(2)
2015	Coritiba	14	(0)
2016–2017	Náutico	8	(0)
2017	→ Fortaleza (loan)	0	(0)
2018	Anapolina	0	(0)
2018	Aparecidense	1	(0)
2018	Cuiabá	1	(0)
2018–2019	Najran		
2019	Bhayangkara	0	(0)
2020–	Gama	0	(0)
- * Club domestic league appearances and goals as of 10:58, 7 September 2020 (UTC)

Rubens Raimundo da Silva (born 10 October 1989), commonly known as Esquerdinha, is a Brazilian professional footballer who play as an attacking midfielder for Gama.

== Career ==
Born in Recife, Pernambuco, Esquerdinha graduated with Santa Cruz's youth setup. He subsequently represented Icasa, Centro Limoeirense, Bragantino, Ituano, Caldense, Boa Esporte, Chapecoense, ABC and Red Bull Brasil before returning to Ituano in May 2013.

On 29 April 2014, after being crowned champions of the year's Campeonato Paulista, Esquerdinha signed a two-year deal with Goiás. He made his debut in the competition on 10 May, coming on as a second-half substitute in a 2–0 away loss against Palmeiras, and scored his first goal on 21 September, netting the second in a 6–0 home routing of the same opponent.

On 3 March 2019, Esquerdinha officially joined Indonesian club Bhayangkara. He played four games for the club in the Indonesia President's Cup, but on 13 April the club announced, that they had released the player in preparation for the 1st League of the 2019 season.
