= João Ananias (footballer, born 1991) =

Brazilian footballer

Personal information
- Full name: João Ananias Jordão Júnior
- Date of birth: January 12, 1991 (age 35)
- Place of birth: Recife, Brazil
- Height: 1.74 m (5 ft 9 in)
- Position: Defensive midfielder

Team information
- Current team: Njarðvík
- Number: 7

Youth career
- 2008–2011: Náutico

Senior career*
Years	Team	Apps	(Gls)
2011–2017	Náutico	137	(1)
2013	→ W Connection (loan)	5	(0)
2017–2018	Santa Cruz	23	(1)
2018	Cuiabá	0	(0)
2018	→ Salgueiro (loan)	6	(0)
2019	Joinville	19	(0)
2019	Ventspils	1	(0)
2020	Ríver	1	(0)
2020	Brasil de Pelotas	14	(0)
2021	Anápolis	7	(0)
2021	Treze	10	(0)
2022	KF Bylis	16	(0)
2023–	Njarðvík	63	(2)
- * Club domestic league appearances and goals as of 15 October 2025

João Ananias Jordão Júnior (born January 12, 1991, in Recife), also known as João Ananias, is a Brazilian football player who plays for Njarðvík as a defensive midfielder.

== Career ==
In the summer 2019, Ananias joined Latvian club FK Ventspils. However, he left the club two months later after playing only one cup game for the club. He returned to Brazil to play for futsal team Náutico Fut7. On 4 November it was announced, that he would join Ríver Atlético Clube from the 2020 season.

In May 2021, Ananias joined Treze, having spend the first part of the year playing for Anápolis.
