= Joazi =

Brazilian footballer

Personal information
- Full name: Joazi Oliveira da Silva
- Date of birth: 28 October 1996 (age 30)
- Place of birth: Recife, Brazil
- Height: 1.68 m (5 ft 6 in)
- Position: Right back

Team information
- Current team: Uberlândia

Youth career
- 2011–2015: Náutico
- 2015: → Palmeiras (loan)

Senior career*
Years	Team	Apps	(Gls)
2015–2018	Náutico	60	(0)
2015	→ Porto (loan)	9	(0)
2018	→ Boa Esporte (loan)	13	(0)
2019	CSA	3	(0)
2019	América-RN	15	(1)
2020	Uberlândia	9	(0)
2020	Sampaio Corrêa	29	(0)
2021–	Uberlândia	5	(0)
- * Club domestic league appearances and goals as of 21:51, 20 April 2020 (UTC)

Joazi Oliveira da Silva (born 28 October 1996) is a Brazilian footballer who plays for Uberlândia as a right back.

== Club career ==
Born in Recife, Joazi joined the youth academy of Náutico in 2011. In January 2015, he was promoted to the senior team at the age of 17, becoming the youngest member of the squad. However, he spent the season on loan, first at Porto in Campeonato Pernambucano and then with the under-20 team of Palmeiras.

On 20 April 2016, Joazi scored his first goal for Náutico in a 3–1 defeat against Santa Cruz in Campeonato Pernambucano. He played regularly during the season and his contract was extended until 2018 on 5 October.

Joazi broke the medial collateral ligament of his right knee on 15 February 2017, during a Copa do Brasil match against Guarani de Juazeiro. Subsequently, he was ruled out of play for three months. After playing irregularly during the season during which his club was relegated, he was loaned out to Boa Esporte on 20 November.

On 3 January 2019, Joazi signed with CSA for the upcoming season.

== Career statistics ==
As of match played on 18 March 2018

Club	Season	National League			State League		Cup		Other		Total	
Club	Season	Division	Apps	Goals	Apps	Goals	Apps	Goals	Apps	Goals	Apps	Goals
Náutico	2016	Série B	36	0	7	1	1	0	—		44	1
Náutico	2017	Série B	10	0	3	0	1	0	3 (Note: Appearances in Copa do Nordeste)	0	17	0
Náutico	Total		46	0	10	1	2	0	3	0	61	1
Porto (loan)	2015	Pernambucano A1	—		9	0	0	0	—		9	0
Boa Esporte (loan)	2017	Série B	0	0	11	0	2	0	—		13	0
Career total			46	0	30	1	4	0	3	0	83	1
