= Fábio Alves (footballer, born 1988) =

Brazilian footballer

Personal information
- Full name: Fábio Alves da Silva
- Date of birth: 9 March 1988 (age 38)
- Place of birth: Curitiba, Brazil
- Height: 1.84 m (6 ft 0 in)
- Position: Left-back

Team information
- Current team: Floresta

Senior career*
Years	Team	Apps	(Gls)
2006–2009	Cianorte		
2007	→ Nacional-PR (loan)		
2009	Mirassol		
2010	Duque de Caxias	7	(0)
2011	Sergipe		
2011	Chapecoense	2	(1)
2012	Londrina	8	(0)
2012	Penapolense		
2013	Rio Branco-PR	19	(2)
2013–2014	São José-RS		
2014	→ Rio Branco-PR (loan)	9	(0)
2014	Paysandu	8	(0)
2015	ASA	26	(2)
2016–2017	URT	33	(4)
2018–2019	Botafogo-PB	32	(2)
2020	Uberlândia	10	(3)
2020–	Floresta	40	(5)
- * Club domestic league appearances and goals as of 14:51, 18 April 2022 (UTC)

Fábio Alves da Silva (born 9 March 1988), commonly known as Fábio Alves, is a Brazilian professional footballer who plays as a left-back for Floresta.

== Club career ==
On 17 April 2022, Fábio Alves scored a long-range free kick for Floresta against Vitória, garnering international recognition.

== Career statistics ==
=== Club ===
As of 18 April 2022.

Club	Season	League			State League		Cup		Other		Total	
Club	Season	Division	Apps	Goals	Apps	Goals	Apps	Goals	Apps	Goals	Apps	Goals
Duque de Caxias	2010	Série B	0	0	7 (Note: Appearances in the Campeonato Carioca)	0	0	0	0	0	7	0
Chapecoense	2011	Série C	2	1	0	0	0	0	0	0	2	1
Londrina	2012	–			8 (Note: Appearances in the Campeonato Paranaense)	0	0	0	0	0	8	0
Rio Branco-PR	2013	–			19	2	0	0	0	0	19	2
Rio Branco-PR (loan)	2014	–			9	0	0	0	0	0	9	0
Rio Branco-PR (loan)	Total		0	0	28	2	0	0	0	0	28	2
Paysandu	2014	Série C	8	0	0	0	3 (Note: Appearances in the Copa do Brasil)	0	0	0	11	0
ASA	2015	Série C	16	0	10 (Note: Appearances in the Campeonato Alagoano)	2	3	0	0	0	29	2
URT	2016	Série D	0	0	10 (Note: Appearances in the Campeonato Mineiro)	1	0	0	0	0	10	1
URT	2017	Série D	11	2	12	1	1	0	0	0	24	3
URT	Total		11	2	22	2	1	0	0	0	34	4
Botafogo-PB	2018	Série C	6	0	8 (Note: Appearances in the Campeonato Paraibano)	0	2	0	3 (Note: Appearances in the Copa do Nordeste)	0	19	0
Botafogo-PB	2019	Série C	9	1	7	1	4	0	11	1	31	3
Botafogo-PB	Total		15	1	15	1	6	0	14	1	50	3
Uberlândia	2020	–			10	3	0	0	0	0	10	3
Floresta	2020	Série D	21	1	0	0	0	0	2 (Note: Appearances in the Copa Fares Lopes)	0	23	1
Floresta	2021	Série C	14	3	3 (Note: Appearances in the Campeonato Cearense Série B)	0	0	0	6 (Note: Four appearances and two goals in the Copa do Nordeste, two appearances in the Copa Fares Lopes)	2	23	5
Floresta	2022	Série C	2	1	0	0	0	0	6	1	8	2
Floresta	Total		37	5	3	0	6	0	14	3	54	8
Career total			89	9	85	10	13	0	28	4	215	23
