= 2023 Sport Club do Recife season =

Sport Recife
2023 season
- Chairman: Yuri Romão
- Manager: Enderson Moreira; César Lucena (c)
- Stadium: Ilha do Retiro
- Série B: 7th
- Pernambucano: Champions (43rd title)
- Copa do Nordeste: Runners-up
- Copa do Brasil: Round of 16
- Top goalscorer: League: Vágner Love (11); All: Vágner Love (23)
| Home colours | Away colours | Third colours |

The 2023 season was Sport Recife's 119th season in the club's history. The year started promisingly for Sport, in the first few months Lions of The Island won an undefeated state championship, Campeonato Pernambucano, the last title had been won in 2019. The club also reached the final of northeast clubs cup in Brazil, Copa do Nordeste, for the seventh time in its history, repeating the final won in 2014 against Ceará. This time the team was defeated on penalties after a 1–2 away loss and a 1–0 home win. The performance in the Copa do Brasil was considered positive due the elimination against São Paulo, that would be champion of the tournament, only in a penalty shootout after a victory achieved in Morumbi Stadium. Despite the favorable results in the first half of the season, the last semester led to head coach Enderson Moreira's resignation by not qualifying Sport to the Série A, first division in national league, owing to a performance decay in the last rounds of the championship.

== Squad ==
Note: Flags indicate national team as defined under FIFA eligibility rules; some limited exceptions apply. Players may hold more than one non-FIFA nationality.

| No. | Pos. | Nation | Player |
|---|---|---|---|
| 1 | GK | BRA | Denis |
| 2 | DF | BRA | Ewerthon |
| 5 | MF | BRA | Ronaldo Henrique |
| 6 | DF | BRA | Felipinho |
| 7 | MF | BRA | Fabinho |
| 8 | MF | ARG | Alan Ruiz |
| 9 | FW | BRA | Vágner Love |
| 10 | MF | BRA | Jorginho |
| 11 | FW | BRA | Edinho |
| 12 | DF | BRA | Alisson Cassiano |
| 13 | DF | BRA | Renzo |
| 15 | DF | BRA | Rafael Thyere |
| 16 | DF | BRA | Igor Cariús |
| 17 | DF | BRA | Nathan |
| 20 | FW | BRA | Edison Negueba |
| 23 | FW | BRA | Michel Lima |
| 26 | DF | BRA | Eduardo |
| 28 | DF | VEN | Roberto Rosales |
| 30 | FW | URU | Facundo Labandeira |
| 32 | GK | BRA | Denival |

| No. | Pos. | Nation | Player |
|---|---|---|---|
| 33 | GK | BRA | Renan |
| 35 | DF | BRA | Sabino |
| 39 | MF | BRA | Ítalo |
| 41 | GK | BRA | Adriano |
| 44 | DF | BRA | Chico |
| 47 | MF | BRA | Fábio Matheus |
| 48 | MF | BRA | Pedro Martins |
| 52 | DF | BRA | Victor Gabriel |
| 55 | MF | BRA | Lucas André |
| 56 | MF | BRA | Juan Xavier |
| 57 | FW | BRA | Gean Carlos |
| 58 | DF | BRA | Matheus Baraka |
| 76 | GK | BRA | Jordan |
| 77 | FW | BRA | João Peglow |
| 87 | FW | BRA | Diego Souza |
| 88 | MF | BUL | Wanderson |
| 90 | FW | BRA | Gabriel Santos |
| 94 | MF | BRA | Felipe |
| 97 | FW | BRA | Fabrício Daniel |

== Statistics ==
=== Overall ===
| Games played | 69 (15 Pernambucano, 12 Copa do Nordeste, 4 Copa do Brasil, 38 Série B) |
| Games won | 40 (12 Pernambucano, 9 Copa do Nordeste, 2 Copa do Brasil, 17 Série B) |
| Games drawn | 17 (3 Pernambucano, 1 Copa do Nordeste, 1 Copa do Brasil, 12 Série B) |
| Games lost | 12 (0 Pernambucano, 2 Copa do Nordeste, 1 Copa do Brasil, 9 Série B) |
| Goals scored | 128 |
| Goals conceded | 60 |
| Goal difference | +68 |
| Best results (goal difference) | 6–0 (H) v Bahia - Copa do Nordeste - 2023.02.22 |
| Worst result (goal difference) | 1–3 (A) v Atlético Goianiense - Série B - 2023.07.14; 1–3 (A) v Guarani - Série B - 2023.08.18 |
| Top scorer | Vágner Love (23) |

Source: Sport Recife official website

=== Goalscorers ===
| Place | Pos. | Nat. | No. | Name | Campeonato Pernambucano | Copa do Nordeste | Copa do Brasil | Série B | Total |
|---|---|---|---|---|---|---|---|---|---|
| 1 | FW | (Brazil) | 9 | Vágner Love | 5 | 5 | 2 | 11 | 23 |
| 2 | DF | (Brazil) | 46 | Luciano Juba | 6 | 6 | 1 | 7 | 20 |
| 3 | MF | (Brazil) | 10 | Jorginho | 3 | 3 | 0 | 7 | 13 |
| 4 | FW | (Uruguay) | 30 | Facundo Labandeira | 4 | 2 | 0 | 1 | 7 |
| = | DF | (Brazil) | 35 | Sabino | 1 | 3 | 2 | 1 | 7 |
| 5 | FW | (Brazil) | 11 | Edinho | 2 | 2 | 0 | 2 | 6 |
| 6 | MF | (Brazil) | 7 | Fabinho | 2 | 1 | 0 | 2 | 5 |
| = | DF | (Brazil) | 15 | Rafael Thyere | 2 | 1 | 0 | 2 | 5 |
| = | MF | (Brazil) | 5 | Ronaldo Henrique | 1 | 0 | 0 | 4 | 5 |
| = | MF | (Brazil) (Bulgaria) | 77 | Wanderson | 2 | 0 | 1 | 2 | 5 |
| 7 | DF | (Brazil) | 38 | Felipinho | 1 | 0 | 0 | 3 | 4 |
| = | FW | (Brazil) | 97 | Fabrício Daniel | 0 | 0 | 0 | 4 | 4 |
| = | MF | (Brazil) | 90 | Gabriel Santos | 3 | 1 | 0 | 0 | 4 |
| 8 | MF | (Brazil) | 48 | Fábio Matheus | 0 | 0 | 0 | 3 | 3 |
| 9 | MF | (Argentina) | 8 | Alan Ruiz | 0 | 0 | 0 | 2 | 2 |
| = | DF | (Brazil) | 2 | Ewerthon | 1 | 0 | 1 | 0 | 2 |
| = | MF | (Brazil) | 77 | João Peglow | 0 | 0 | 0 | 2 | 2 |
| 10 | DF | (Brazil) | 12 | Alisson Cassiano | 0 | 0 | 1 | 0 | 1 |
| = | FW | (Brazil) | 87 | Diego Souza | 0 | 0 | 0 | 1 | 1 |
| = | DF | (Brazil) | 16 | Igor Cariús | 0 | 1 | 0 | 0 | 1 |
| = | MF | (Brazil) | 8 | Matheus Vargas | 1 | 0 | 0 | 0 | 1 |
| = | FW | (Brazil) | 23 | Michel Lima | 0 | 0 | 0 | 1 | 1 |
| = | DF | (Brazil) | 13 | Renzo | 1 | 0 | 0 | 0 | 1 |
| | | | | Own goals | 0 | 1 | 0 | 4 | 5 |
| | | | | Total | 35 | 26 | 8 | 59 | 128 |

=== Managers performance ===
| Name | From | To | P | W | D | L | GF | GA | Avg% | Ref |
|---|---|---|---|---|---|---|---|---|---|---|
| (Brazil) Enderson Moreira | 11 January 2023 | 18 November 2023 | 68 | 39 | 17 | 12 | 124 | 59 | 65% | |
| (Brazil) César Lucena (c) | 25 November 2023 | 25 November 2023 | 1 | 1 | 0 | 0 | 4 | 1 | 100% | |

(c) Indicates the caretaker manager

=== Home record ===
| Recife | São Lourenço da Mata |
|---|---|
| Ilha do Retiro | Arena Pernambuco |
| Capacity: 32,983 | Capacity: 44,300 |
| 35 matches (28 wins 4 draws 3 losses) | 1 match (1 draw) |

=== Overview ===
| Competition | First match | Last match | Starting round | Final position | Record | | | | | | | |
| Competition | First match | Last match | Starting round | Final position | Pld | W | D | L | GF | GA | GD | Win % |
|---|---|---|---|---|---|---|---|---|---|---|---|---|
| Série B | 30 April | 25 November | Matchday 1 | 7th | 38 | 17 | 12 | 9 | 59 | 40 | +19 | 44.74 |
| Pernambucano | 11 January | 22 April | First stage | Winners | 15 | 12 | 3 | 0 | 35 | 7 | +28 | 80.00 |
| Copa do Nordeste | 21 January | 3 May | Group stage | Runners-up | 12 | 9 | 1 | 2 | 26 | 7 | +19 | 75.00 |
| Copa do Brasil | 12 April | 1 June | Third round | 13th | 4 | 2 | 1 | 1 | 8 | 6 | +2 | 50.00 |
| Total | | | | | 69 | 40 | 17 | 12 | 128 | 60 | +68 | 57.97 |

Source: Competitions

== Competitions ==
=== Campeonato Pernambucano ===
==== First stage ====
| 11 January 2023 2 | Maguary | 1–1 | Sport | Bonito |
| 21:00 (UTC-3) | Luan 41' | Report | Edinho 86' | Stadium: Estádio Arthur Tavares de Melo; Attendance: 3,181; Referee: Rodrigo José Pereira de Lima |

| 14 January 2023 3 | Sport | 2–0 | Petrolina | Recife |
| 16:30 (UTC-3) | Matheus Vargas 45+4'; Vagner Love 81' | Report | | Stadium: Estádio Adelmar da Costa Carvalho (Ilha do Retiro); Attendance: 10,218; Referee: Anderson Luís Marques |

| 17 January 2023 4 | Salgueiro | 1–2 | Sport | Salgueiro |
| 20:00 (UTC-3) | Juan Kelsen 43' | Report | Luciano Juba 34'; Ronaldo Henrique 90+4' (pen.) | Stadium: Estádio Cornélio de Barros; Attendance: 2,166; Referee: José Woshington da Silva |

| 24 January 2023 5 | Sport | 6–1 | Belo Jardim | Recife |
| 20:00 (UTC-3) | Rafael Thyere 4'; Jorginho 12'; Edinho 39'; Wanderson 64', 77'; Gabriel Santos 90+2' | Report | Vitor 89' | Stadium: Estádio Adelmar da Costa Carvalho (Ilha do Retiro); Attendance: 5,306; Referee: Maximiniano Fagundes de Assuncão |

| 28 January 2023 6 | Sport | 1–0 | Retrô | Recife |
| 19:00 (UTC-3) | Labandeira 89' | Report | | Stadium: Estádio Adelmar da Costa Carvalho (Ilha do Retiro); Attendance: 11,132; Referee: Tiago Nascimento |

| 1 February 2023 7 | Sport | 4–1 | Afogados da Ingazeira | Recife |
| 18:00 (UTC-3) | Rafael Thyere 7'; Sabino 14'; Fabinho 17'; Luciano Juba 49' | Report | Venicius 88' | Stadium: Estádio Adelmar da Costa Carvalho (Ilha do Retiro); Attendance: 8,003; Referee: Rodrigo José Pereira de Lima |

| 8 February 2023 8 | Porto | 0–0 | Sport | Caruaru |
| 20:00 (UTC-3) | | Report | | Stadium: Estádio Luiz José de Lacerda (Lacerdão); Attendance: 4,874; Referee: Nairon Pereira de Lira |

| 11 February 2023 9 | Náutico | 2–2 | Sport | Recife |
| 20:30 (UTC-3) | Gabriel Santiago 46'; Victor Ferraz 90+2' | Report | Ewerthon 31'; Labandeira 62' | Stadium: Estádio Eládio de Barros Carvalho (Aflitos); Attendance: 5,226; Referee: José Washington da Silva |

| 26 February 2023 10 | Caruaru City | 0–3 | Sport | São Lourenço da Mata |
| 16:00 (UTC-3) | | Report | Labandeira 35'; Gabriel Santos 87'; Felipinho 90+4' | Stadium: Estádio Governador Carlos Wilson Campos (Arena Pernambuco); Attendance: 6,841; Referee: Luiz Claudio Sobral |

| 1 March 2023 1 | Sport | 5–0 | Íbis | Recife |
| 20:00 (UTC-3) | Jorginho 11'; Luciano Juba 29', 71'; Labandeira 56'; Vágner Love 66' | Report | | Stadium: Estádio Adelmar da Costa Carvalho (Ilha do Retiro); Attendance: 6,016; Referee: Nairon Pereira de Lira |

| 11 March 2023 11 | Sport | 2–0 | Santa Cruz | Recife |
| 16:30 (UTC-3) | Jorginho 15'; Luciano Juba 62' | Report | | Stadium: Estádio Adelmar da Costa Carvalho (Ilha do Retiro); Attendance: 16,057; Referee: Deborah Cecília |

| 1 April 2023 12 | Central | 0–1 | Sport | Caruaru |
| 16:30 (UTC-3) | | Report | Renzo 43' | Stadium: Estádio Luiz José de Lacerda (Lacerdão); Attendance: 4,103; Referee: Michelangelo Martins de Almeida Júnior |

==== Semi-final ====
| 7 April 2023 Single match | Sport | 2–0 | Petrolina | Recife |
| 16:30 (UTC-3) | Luciano Juba 30'; Vágner Love 57' | Report | | Stadium: Estádio Adelmar da Costa Carvalho (Ilha do Retiro); Attendance: 19,509; Referee: Diego Fernando |

==== Finals ====
| 15 April 2023 First leg | Retrô | 1–2 | Sport | São Lourenço da Mata |
| 16:30 (UTC-3) | Jonas 45+2' | Report | Fabinho 41'; Vágner Love 90+5' | Stadium: Estádio Governador Carlos Wilson Campos (Arena Pernambuco); Attendance: 7,090; Referee: Diego Fernando Silva de Lima |

| 22 April 2023 Second leg | Sport | 2–0 | Retrô | Recife |
| 16:30 (UTC-3) | Vágner Love 21'; Gabriel Santos 84' | Report | | Stadium: Estádio Adelmar da Costa Carvalho (Ilha do Retiro); Attendance: 26,345; Referee: Rodrigo José Pereira de Lima |

==== Record ====
| Final Position | Points | Matches | Wins | Draws | Losses | Goals For | Goals Away | Avg% |
|---|---|---|---|---|---|---|---|---|
| 1st | 39 | 15 | 12 | 3 | 0 | 35 | 7 | 86% |

=== Copa do Nordeste ===
==== Group stage ====
| 21 January 2023 1 | Sport | 2–0 | ABC | Recife |
| 19:30 (UTC-3) | Edinho 49'; Sabino 88' | Report | | Stadium: Estádio Adelmar da Costa Carvalho (Ilha do Retiro); Attendance: 10,253; Referee: Emerson Ricardo de Almeida Andrade |

| 5 February 2023 2 | Campinense | 0–2 | Sport | Campina Grande |
| 18:00 (UTC-3) | | Report | Sabino 39'; Jorginho 55' | Stadium: Estádio Governador Ernani Sátyro (Amigão); Attendance: 3,254; Referee: Adriano Barros Carneiro |

| 14 February 2023 3 | Ceará | 3–2 | Sport | Fortaleza |
| 21:30 (UTC-3) | Willian Formiga 6'; David Ricardo 45+2'; Janderson 56' | Report | Luciano Juba 18'; Vagner Love 80' | Stadium: Estádio Presidente Vargas; Attendance: 13,376; Referee: Diego Pombo Lopez |

| 22 February 2023 5 | Sport | 6–0 | Bahia | Recife |
| 21:30 (UTC-3) | Luciano Juba 18', 26' (pen.); Jorginho 36'; Vagner Love 55', 59'; Sabino 90+3' | Report | | Stadium: Estádio Adelmar da Costa Carvalho (Ilha do Retiro); Attendance: 9,709; Referee: Antônio Dib Moraes de Sousa |

| 4 March 2023 6 | Náutico | 0–2 | Sport | Recife |
| 17:30 (UTC-3) | | Report | Fabinho 62'; Luciano Juba 90+7' | Stadium: Estádio Eládio de Barros Carvalho (Aflitos); Attendance: 7,394; Referee: Caio Max Augusto Vieira |

| 8 March 2023 7 | Sport | 2–1 | Sergipe | Recife |
| 21:30 (UTC-3) | Vágner Love 33'; Rafael Thyere 89' | Report | Abner 67' | Stadium: Estádio Adelmar da Costa Carvalho (Ilha do Retiro); Attendance: 8,616; Referee: Diego Pombo Lopez |

| 18 March 2023 4 | Sport | 0–0 | Santa Cruz | São Lourenço da Mata |
| 17:30 (UTC-3) | | Report | | Stadium: Estádio Governador Carlos Wilson Campos (Arena Pernambuco); Attendance: 27,502; Referee: Emerson Ricardo de Almeida Andrade |

| 22 March 2023 8 | CSA | 1–3 | Sport | Maceió |
| 21:30 (UTC-3) | Celsinho 13' | Report | Labandeira 47', 45+5'; Gabriel Santos 72' | Stadium: Estádio Rei Pelé; Attendance: 1,966; Referee: Bruno Pereira Vasconcelos |

==== Quarter-final ====
| 26 March 2023 | Sport | 4–0 | CRB | Recife |
| 18:00 (UTC-3) | Jorginho 33'; Luciano Juba 59'; Igor Cariús 78'; Edinho 88' | Report | | Stadium: Estádio Adelmar da Costa Carvalho (Ilha do Retiro); Attendance: 25,008; Referee: Diego Pombo Lopez |

==== Semi-final ====
| 29 March 2023 | Sport | 1–0 | ABC | Recife |
| 21:30 (UTC-3) | Vágner Love 2' | Report | | Stadium: Estádio Adelmar da Costa Carvalho (Ilha do Retiro); Attendance: 26,189; Referee: Denis da Silva Ribeiro Serafim |

==== Finals ====
| 19 April 2023 | Ceará | 2–1 | Sport | Fortaleza |
| 21:30 (UTC-3) | Guilherme Castilho 1'; Vitor Gabriel 45+1' | Report | David Ricardo 90+8' (o.g.) | Stadium: Estádio Governador Plácido Castelo (Castelão); Attendance: 59,889; Referee: Caio Max Augusto Vieira |

| 3 May 2023 | Sport | 1–0 (2–4 p) | Ceará | Recife |
| 21:00 (UTC-3) | Luciano Juba 26' | Report | | Stadium: Estádio Adelmar da Costa Carvalho (Ilha do Retiro); Attendance: 26,345; Referee: Denis da Silva Ribeiro Serafim |
| | Penalties |
| | Luciano Juba (penalty missed); Vágner Love (penalty scored); Sabino (penalty scored); Gabriel Santos (penalty missed) | | (penalty scored) Danilo Barcelos; (penalty scored) Jean Carlos; (penalty missed) Guilherme Castilho; (penalty scored) Luvannor; (penalty scored) Erick |

==== Record ====
| Final Position | Points | Matches | Wins | Draws | Losses | Goals For | Goals Away | Avg% |
|---|---|---|---|---|---|---|---|---|
| 2nd | 28 | 12 | 9 | 1 | 2 | 26 | 7 | 78% |

=== Copa do Brasil ===
==== Third round ====
| 12 April 2023 | Coritiba | 3–3 | Sport | Curitiba |
| 19:00 (UTC-3) | Alef Manga 16', 26', 76' (pen.) | Report | Vágner Love 9', 60'; Luciano Juba 51' | Stadium: Estádio Major Antônio (Couto Pereira); Attendance: 31,596; Referee: Leandro Vuaden |

| 26 April 2023 | Sport | 2–0 | Coritiba | Recife |
| 19:00 (UTC-3) | Ewerthon 4'; Wanderson 71' | Report | | Stadium: Estádio Adelmar da Costa Carvalho (Ilha do Retiro); Attendance: 23,105; Referee: Braulio da Silva Machado |

==== Round of 16 ====
| 17 May 2023 | Sport | 0–2 | São Paulo | Recife |
| 20:00 (UTC-3) | | Report | Luciano 71'; Marcos Paulo 89' | Stadium: Estádio Adelmar da Costa Carvalho (Ilha do Retiro); Attendance: 22,889; Referee: Wilton Pereira Sampaio |

| 1 June 2023 | São Paulo | 1–3 (5–3 p) | Sport | São Paulo |
| 19:30 (UTC-3) | Michel Araújo 26' | Report | Alisson Cassiano 44'; Sabino 52', 90+4' | Stadium: Estádio Cícero Pompeu de Toledo (Morumbi); Attendance: 49,792; Referee: Wagner do Nascimento Magalhães |
| | Penalties |
| | Wellington Rato (penalty scored); Lucas Beraldo (penalty scored); Jonathan Calleri (penalty scored); Rafinha (penalty scored); Pablo Maia (penalty scored) | | (penalty scored) Sabino; (penalty missed) Luciano Juba; (penalty scored) Alisson Cassiano; (penalty scored) Rafael Thyere |

==== Record ====
| Final Position | Points | Matches | Wins | Draws | Losses | Goals For | Goals Away | Avg% |
|---|---|---|---|---|---|---|---|---|
| 13th | 7 | 4 | 2 | 1 | 1 | 8 | 6 | 58% |

=== Série B ===
==== League table ====
| Pos | Team | Pld | W | D | L | GF | GA | GD | Pts |
|---|---|---|---|---|---|---|---|---|---|
| 5 | Novorizontino | 38 | 19 | 6 | 13 | 48 | 30 | +18 | 63 |
| 6 | Mirassol | 38 | 18 | 9 | 11 | 42 | 31 | +11 | 63 |
| 7 | Sport | 38 | 17 | 12 | 9 | 59 | 40 | +19 | 63 |
| 8 | Vila Nova | 38 | 17 | 10 | 11 | 49 | 30 | +19 | 61 |
| 9 | CRB | 38 | 16 | 9 | 13 | 45 | 39 | +6 | 57 |

Source: CBF
Rules for classification: 1) points; 2) wins; 3) goal difference; 4) goals scored; 5) head-to-head results (only between 2 teams); 6) fewest red cards; 7) fewest yellow cards; 8) drawing of lots.

==== Results summary ====
| Overall | | | | | | | | Home | | | | | | Away | | | | | |
| Pld | W | D | L | GF | GA | GD | Pts | W | D | L | GF | GA | GD | W | D | L | GF | GA | GD |
|---|---|---|---|---|---|---|---|---|---|---|---|---|---|---|---|---|---|---|---|
| 38 | 17 | 12 | 9 | 59 | 40 | +19 | 63 | 13 | 4 | 2 | 41 | 16 | +25 | 4 | 8 | 7 | 18 | 24 | −6 |

==== Matches ====
| 30 April 2023 3 | Novorizontino | 0–0 | Sport | Novo Horizonte |
| 15:30 (UTC-3) | | Report | | Stadium: Estádio Doutor Jorge Ismael de Biasi; Attendance: 2,122; Referee: Paulo César Zanovelli da Silva |

| 7 May 2023 5 | Sport | 2–0 | Guarani | Recife |
| 19:00 (UTC-3) | Rafael Thyere 29', 44' | Report | | Stadium: Estádio Adelmar da Costa Carvalho (Ilha do Retiro); Attendance: 0 Referee: Anderson Daronco |

| 10 May 2023 4* | Sport | 3–2 | Tombense | Recife |
| 21:30 (UTC-3) | Jorginho 13', 34'; Luciano Juba 53' | Report | Alex Sandro 31', 69' | Stadium: Estádio Adelmar da Costa Carvalho (Ilha do Retiro); Attendance: 0 Referee: Luiz Flavio de Oliveira |

| 14 May 2023 6 | Ituano | 1–1 | Sport | Itu |
| 20:30 (UTC-3) | Rafael Carvalheira 31' | Report | Vágner Love 20' | Stadium: Estádio Municipal Dr. Novelli Júnior; Attendance: 1,307; Referee: Léo Simão Holanda |

| 20 May 2023 7 | Sport | 3–0 | Botafogo–SP | Recife |
| 16:00 (UTC-3) | Márcio Silva 45+5' (o.g.); Vágner Love 60', 90+3' | Report | | Stadium: Estádio Adelmar da Costa Carvalho (Ilha do Retiro); Attendance: 18,223; Referee: Bruno Mota Correia |

| 24 May 2023 8 | Criciúma | 1–0 | Sport | Criciúma |
| 21:30 (UTC-3) | Rômulo 3' | Report | | Stadium: Estádio Heriberto Hülse; Attendance: 12,709; Referee: João Vitor Gobi |

| 28 May 2023 9 | Sport | 4–1 | ABC | Recife |
| 18:00 (UTC-3) | Vágner Love 34', 55'; Luciano Juba 62'; Fábio Matheus 79' | Report | Júnior Todinho 45+3' | Stadium: Estádio Adelmar da Costa Carvalho (Ilha do Retiro); Attendance: 18,358; Referee: Dyorgines Jose Padovani de Andrade |

| 4 June 2023 10 | Londrina | 1–2 | Sport | Londrina |
| 18:30 (UTC-3) | Gabriel 4' | Report | Vágner Love 67', 76' | Stadium: Estádio Jacy Scaff (do Café); Attendance: 980; Referee: Thiago Luis Scarascati |

| 7 June 2023 11 | Sport | 2–1 | Avaí | Recife |
| 19:00 (UTC-3) | Fabrício Daniel 3'; Luciano Juba 49' | Report | Waguininho 90+2' (pen.) | Stadium: Estádio Adelmar da Costa Carvalho (Ilha do Retiro); Attendance: 18,699; Referee: Yuri Elino Ferreira da Cruz |

| 10 June 2023 12 | Ponte Preta | 1–1 | Sport | Campinas |
| 11:00 (UTC-3) | Pablo Dyego 21' | Report | Luciano Juba 45+7' | Stadium: Estádio Moisés Lucarelli; Attendance: 5,065; Referee: Bruno Arleu de Araújo |

| 18 June 2023 2* | Sport | 1–0 | Vila Nova | Recife |
| 18:00 (UTC-3) | Vágner Love 25' | Report | | Stadium: Estádio Adelmar da Costa Carvalho (Ilha do Retiro); Attendance: 15,004; Referee: Paulo César Zanovelli |

| 22 June 2023 13 | Sport | 3–0 | Juventude | Recife |
| 21:30 (UTC-3) | Luciano Juba 11'; Vágner Love 32'; Felipinho 64' | Report | | Stadium: Estádio Adelmar da Costa Carvalho (Ilha do Retiro); Attendance: 14,136; Referee: Matheus Delgado Candançan |

| 27 June 2023 14 | Chapecoense | 1–1 | Sport | Chapecó |
| 19:00 (UTC-3) | Bruno Nazário 89' | Report | Fábio Matheus 39' | Stadium: Arena Condá; Attendance: 5,760; Referee: Leonardo Ferreira Lima |

| 2 July 2023 15 | Sport | 2–0 | Ceará | Recife |
| 18:00 (UTC-3) | Ronaldo Henrique 30' (pen.); Luciano Juba 45+5' | Report | | Stadium: Estádio Adelmar da Costa Carvalho (Ilha do Retiro); Attendance: 17,713; Referee: Bruno Arleu de Araújo |

| 5 July 2023 1* | CRB | 2–0 | Sport | Maceió |
| 19:00 (UTC-3) | Anselmo Ramon 14'; Jordan 86' (o.g.) | Report | | Stadium: Estádio Rei Pelé; Attendance: 7,014; Referee: Caio Max Augusto Vieira |

| 9 July 2023 16 | Sport | 0–0 | Mirassol | Recife |
| 18:00 (UTC-3) | | Report | | Stadium: Estádio Adelmar da Costa Carvalho (Ilha do Retiro); Attendance: 18.201; Referee: Felipe Fernandes de Lima |

| 14 July 2023 17 | Atlético Goianiense | 3–1 | Sport | Goiânia |
| 21:30 (UTC-3) | Gustavo Coutinho 2', 15' (pen.); Shaylon 40' | Report | Edinho 10' | Stadium: Estádio Antônio Accioly; Attendance: 4,387; Referee: João Vitor Gobi |

| 19 July 2023 18 | Sport | 1–2 | Vitória | Recife |
| 21:30 (UTC-3) | Camutanga 50' (o.g.) | Report | Rafael Thyere 45+3' (o.g.); Zé Hugo 66' | Stadium: Estádio Adelmar da Costa Carvalho (Ilha do Retiro); Attendance: 16,847; Referee: Luiz Flavio de Oliveira |

| 23 July 2023 19 | Sampaio Corrêa | 1–2 | Sport | São Luís |
| 18:00 (UTC-3) | Ytalo 24' | Report | Felipinho 12'; Vágner Love 55' | Stadium: Estádio Governador João Castelo (Castelão); Attendance: 4,621; Referee: Wagner do Nascimento Magalhaes |

| 28 July 2023 20 | Sport | 2–0 | CRB | Recife |
| 21:30 (UTC-3) | Sabino 50'; Ronaldo Henrique 63' (pen.) | Report | | Stadium: Estádio Adelmar da Costa Carvalho (Ilha do Retiro); Attendance: 17,067; Referee: Anderson Daronco |

| 2 August 2023 21 | Vila Nova | 0–1 | Sport | Goiânia |
| 21:30 (UTC-3) | | Report | Luciano Juba 69' | Stadium: Estádio Onésio Brasileiro Alvarenga; Attendance: 7,250; Referee: Luiz Flavio de Oliveira |

| 5 August 2023 22 | Sport | 1–0 | Novorizontino | Recife |
| 18:00 (UTC-3) | Felipinho 70' | Report | | Stadium: Estádio Adelmar da Costa Carvalho (Ilha do Retiro); Attendance: 23,173; Referee: Sávio Pereira Sampaio |

| 11 August 2023 23 | Tombense | 0–0 | Sport | Muriaé |
| 21:30 (UTC-3) | | Report | | Stadium: Estádio Soares de Azevedo; Attendance: 674; Referee: Bráulio da Silva Machado |

| 18 August 2023 24 | Guarani | 3–1 | Sport | Campinas |
| 21:30 (UTC-3) | Bruno Mendes 5'; Bruninho 10'; Matheus Barbosa 35' | Report | Ronaldo Henrique 27' (pen.) | Stadium: Estádio Brinco de Ouro da Princesa; Attendance: 5,275; Referee: Wilton Pereira Sampaio |

| 25 August 2023 25 | Sport | 1–2 | Ituano | Recife |
| 21:30 (UTC-3) | Ronaldo Henrique 65' | Report | Matheus Cadorini 1'; Ewerthon 6' (o.g.) | Stadium: Estádio Adelmar da Costa Carvalho (Ilha do Retiro); Attendance: 19,069; Referee: Felipe Fernandes de Lima |

| 3 September 2023 26 | Botafogo–SP | 1–1 | Sport | Ribeirão Preto |
| 18:00 (UTC-3) | Thassio 15' | Report | Jorginho 24' | Stadium: Estádio Santa Cruz; Attendance: 1,954; Referee: Rafael Rodrigo Klein |

| 9 September 2023 27 | Sport | 3–3 | Criciúma | Recife |
| 20:45 (UTC-3) | Peglow 17'; Jorginho 34'; Fabinho 70' | Report | Éder 31' (pen.), 90+7' (pen.); Hygor 66' | Stadium: Estádio Adelmar da Costa Carvalho (Ilha do Retiro); Attendance: 24,201; Referee: Flávio Rodrigues de Souza |

| 15 September 2023 28 | ABC | 0–1 | Sport | Natal |
| 21:30 (UTC-3) | | Report | Diego Souza 90' | Stadium: Estádio Maria Lamas Farache (Frasqueirão); Attendance: 4,039; Referee: Douglas Marques das Flores |

| 23 September 2023 29 | Sport | 4–0 | Londrina | Recife |
| 20:45 (UTC-3) | Jorginho 31'; Labandeira 50'; Michel Lima 74'; Fábio Matheus 86' | Report | | Stadium: Estádio Adelmar da Costa Carvalho (Ilha do Retiro); Attendance: 26,345; Referee: Sávio Pereira Sampaio |

| 29 September 2023 30 | Avaí | 2–2 | Sport | Florianópolis |
| 19:00 (UTC-3) | Giovanni 1'; Rafael Thyere 37' (o.g.) | Report | Peglow 4'; Fabrício Daniel 90+6' | Stadium: Estádio Aderbal Ramos da Silva (Ressacada); Attendance: 5,205; Referee: Caio Max Augusto Vieira |

| 9 October 2023 31 | Sport | 3–3 | Ponte Preta | Recife |
| 20:00 (UTC-3) | Vágner Love 45+6'; Fabrício Daniel 70' (pen.); Jorginho 80' | Report | Jeh 26'; Maílton 30', 38' (pen.) | Stadium: Estádio Adelmar da Costa Carvalho (Ilha do Retiro); Attendance: 25,247; Referee: José Mendonça da Silva Junior |

| 16 October 2023 32 | Juventude | 2–2 | Sport | Caxias do Sul |
| 20:00 (UTC-3) | Danilo Boza 15'; Gabriel Taliari 61' | Report | Ruiz 41'; Edinho 90+4' | Stadium: Estádio Alfredo Jaconi; Attendance: 7,438; Referee: Sávio Pereira Sampaio |

| 22 October 2023 33 | Sport | 2–1 | Chapecoense | Recife |
| 18:00 (UTC-3) | Gustavo Cazonatti 50' (o.g.); Alan Ruiz 62' | Report | Giovanni Pavani 34' | Stadium: Estádio Adelmar da Costa Carvalho (Ilha do Retiro); Attendance: 26,002; Referee: Wagner do Nascimento Magalhães |

| 27 October 2023 34 | Ceará | 2–1 | Sport | Fortaleza |
| 19:00 (UTC-3) | Chay 10'; Jean Carlos 69' | Report | Jorginho 16' | Stadium: Estádio Governador Plácido Castelo (Castelão); Attendance: 6,430; Referee: Yuri Elino Ferreira da Cruz |

| 3 November 2023 35 | Mirassol | 2–1 | Sport | Mirassol |
| 19:00 (UTC-3) | Gabriel 45+5'; Chico 46' | Report | Wanderson 90+2' | Stadium: Estádio Municipal José Maria de Campos Maia; Attendance: 4,226; Referee: Caio Max Augusto Vieira |

| 10 November 2023 36 | Sport | 0–0 | Atlético Goianiense | Recife |
| 21:30 (UTC-3) | | Report | | Stadium: Estádio Adelmar da Costa Carvalho (Ilha do Retiro); Attendance: 26,345; Referee: Wagner do Nascimento Magalhães |

| 18 November 2023 37 | Vitória | 1–0 | Sport | Salvador |
| 17:00 (UTC-3) | Osvaldo 65' | Report | | Stadium: Estádio Manoel Barradas (Barradão); Attendance: 29,168; Referee: Paulo Cesar Zanovelli da Silva |

| 25 November 2023 38 | Sport | 4–1 | Sampaio Corrêa | Recife |
| 17:00 (UTC-3) | Wanderson 27'; Gustavo Henrique 43' (o.g.); Fabrício Daniel 45+4'; Fabinho 48' | Report | Ytalo 67' (pen.) | Stadium: Estádio Adelmar da Costa Carvalho (Ilha do Retiro); Attendance: 11,520; Referee: Dyorgines Jose Padovani de Andrade |

(*) Postponed matches due to changes in competition schedules

==== Record ====
| Final Position | Points | Matches | Wins | Draws | Losses | Goals For | Goals Away | Avg% |
|---|---|---|---|---|---|---|---|---|
| 7th | 63 | 38 | 17 | 12 | 9 | 59 | 40 | 55% |
