= 2022 Sport Club do Recife season =

Sport Recife
2022 season
- Chairman: Yuri Romão
- Manager: Gustavo Florentín; Cesar Lucena (c); Gilmar Dal Pozzo; Lisca; Claudinei Oliveira
- Stadium: Ilha do Retiro
- Série B: 7th
- Pernambucano: Quarter-final
- Copa do Nordeste: Runners-up
- Copa do Brasil: First stage
- Top goalscorer: League: Vágner Love (7); All: Luciano Juba (10)
Home colours	Away colours	Third colours

The 2022 season was Sport Recife's 118th season in the club's history. Sport competed in the Campeonato Pernambucano, Copa do Nordeste, Série B and Copa do Brasil.

== Squad ==
Note: Flags indicate national team as defined under FIFA eligibility rules; some limited exceptions apply. Players may hold more than one non-FIFA nationality.

No.	Pos.	Nation	Player
1	GK	BRA	Denis
2	DF	BRA	Ewerthon
3	DF	BRA	Fábio Alemão
5	MF	BRA	Ronaldo Henrique
7	MF	BRA	Fabinho
8	MF	BRA	Pedro Victor
9	FW	CHI	Javier Parraguez
11	FW	COL	Ray Vanegas
15	DF	BRA	Rafael Thyere
16	MF	BRA	William Oliveira
17	FW	BRA	Kayke
18	MF	BRA	Alan

No.	Pos.	Nation	Player
52	DF	BRA	Victor Gabriel
53	FW	BRA	Paulinho
56	DF	BRA	Sander (captain)
59	FW	BRA	Flávio Souza
70	MF	BRA	Alê Santos
77	MF	BUL	Wanderson
88	MF	BRA	Denner
91	FW	BRA	Gustavo Coutinho
92	GK	BRA	Carlos Eduardo
95	GK	BRA	Saulo
98	FW	BRA	Bill
99	FW	BRA	Vágner Love

== Statistics ==
=== Overall ===
Games played	61 (10 Pernambucano, 12 Copa do Nordeste, 1 Copa do Brasil, 38 Série B)
Games won	24 (4 Pernambucano, 5 Copa do Nordeste, 0 Copa do Brasil, 15 Série B)
Games drawn	21 (5 Pernambucano, 4 Copa do Nordeste, 0 Copa do Brasil, 12 Série B)
Games lost	16 (1 Pernambucano, 3 Copa do Nordeste, 1 Copa do Brasil, 11 Série B)
Goals scored	75
Goals conceded	52
Goal difference	+23
Best results (goal difference)	7–0 (H) v Sete de Setembro - Pernambucano - 2022.01.26
Worst result (goal difference)	1–4 (A) v Sampaio Corrêa - Série B - 2022.07.22; 1–4 (A) v Ituano - Série B - 2022.08.09
Top scorer	Luciano Juba (10)

Source: Sport Recife official website

=== Goalscorers ===
Place	Pos.	Nat.	No.	Name	Campeonato Pernambucano	Copa do Nordeste	Copa do Brasil	Série B	Total
1	FW	(Brazil)	46	Luciano Juba	2	3	0	5	10
2	FW	(Chile)	9	Javier Parraguez	4	3	0	1	8
3	FW	(Brazil)	99	Vágner Love	0	0	0	7	7
4	FW	(Brazil)	17	Kayke	0	0	0	5	5
=	FW	(Brazil)	99	Mikael	2	3	0	0	5
5	FW	(Brazil)	91	Gustavo Coutinho	2	0	0	2	4
=	FW	(Colombia)	11	Ray Vanegas	1	1	0	2	4
6	FW	(Brazil)	7	Fabinho	0	0	0	3	3
=	FW	(Uruguay)	30	Facundo Labandeira	0	0	0	3	3
=	DF	(Brazil)	20	Jáderson	3	0	0	0	3
7	FW	(Brazil)	98	Bill	0	1	0	1	2
=	FW	(Brazil)	59	Flávio Souza	2	0	0	0	2
=	MF	(Brazil)	6	Pedro Naressi	1	1	0	0	2
=	DF	(Brazil)	15	Rafael Thyere	1	0	0	1	2
=	FW	(Brazil)	90	Rodrigão	1	1	0	0	2
=	DF	(Brazil)	56	Sander	0	0	0	2	2
8	MF	(Brazil)	19	Alan	0	1	0	0	1
=	MF	(Brazil)	31	Bruno Matias	1	0	0	0	1
=	DF	(Brazil)	44	Chico	0	0	0	1	1
=	FW	(Brazil)	49	Cristiano Robert	1	0	0	0	1
=	MF	(Brazil)	88	Denner	0	0	0	1	1
=	MF	(Brazil)	97	Everton Felipe	1	0	0	0	1
=	DF	(Brazil)	2	Ewerthon	1	0	0	0	1
=	MF	(Brazil)	77	Giovanni	0	0	0	1	1
=	MF	(Brazil)	5	Ronaldo Henrique	0	0	0	1	1
=	MF	(Brazil) (Bulgaria)	77	Wanderson	0	0	0	1	1
				Own goals	1	0	0	0	1
				Total	24	14	0	37	75

=== Managers performance ===
Name	From	To	P	W	D	L	GF	GA	Avg%	Ref
(Paraguay) Gustavo Florentín	22 January 2022	3 March 2022	12	4	4	4	17	10	44%	
(Brazil) Cesar Lucena (c)	19 February 2022	22 July 2022	6	2	2	2	10	12	44%	
(Brazil) Gilmar Dal Pozzo	16 March 2022	25 June 2022	21	8	9	4	22	11	52%	
(Brazil) Lisca	3 July 2022	19 July 2022	4	1	3	0	2	0	50%	
(Brazil) Claudinei Oliveira	28 July 2022	6 November 2022	18	9	3	6	24	19	55%	

(c) Indicates the caretaker manager

=== Home record ===
Recife	São Lourenço da Mata
Ilha do Retiro	Arena Pernambuco
Capacity: 32,983	Capacity: 44,300
24 matches (15 wins 8 draws 1 loss)	7 matches (4 wins 2 draws 1 loss)

=== Overview ===
Competition	First match	Last match	Starting round	Final position	Record							
Competition	First match	Last match	Starting round	Final position	Pld	W	D	L	GF	GA	GD	Win %
Copa do Nordeste	22 January	3 April	Group stage 1	2nd	12	5	4	3	14	9	+5	41.67
Campeonato Pernambucano	26 January	6 April	First stage	5th	10	4	5	1	24	11	+13	40.00
Copa do Brasil	3 March	3 March	First round	79th	1	0	0	1	0	1	−1	0.00
Série B	9 April	6 November	Matchday 1	7th	38	15	12	11	37	31	+6	39.47
Total					61	24	21	16	75	52	+23	39.34

Source: Competitions

== Competitions ==
=== Copa do Nordeste ===
==== Group stage ====
22 January 2022 1	CRB	1–0	Sport	Maceió
17:45 (UTC-3)	Marcinho 39'	Report		Stadium: Estádio Rei Pelé; Referee: Emerson Ricardo de Almeida Andrade

29 January 2022 2	Sport	3–2	Náutico	Recife
17:45 (UTC-3)	Mikael 45+1', 74', 87'	Report	Robinho 28'; Kauã 78'	Stadium: Estádio Adelmar da Costa Carvalho (Ilha do Retiro); Referee: Dênis da Silva Ribeiro Serafim

8 February 2022 3	Sport	1–0	Sousa	Recife
19:30 (UTC-3)	Alan 70'	Report		Stadium: Estádio Adelmar da Costa Carvalho (Ilha do Retiro); Referee: Diego da Silva Castro

15 February 2022 4	Ceará	0–0	Sport	Fortaleza
21:30 (UTC-3)		Report		Stadium: Estádio Governador Plácido Castelo (Castelão); Referee: Rafael Carlos Salgueiro Lima

24 February 2022 5	Sport	0–1	Botafogo-PB	Recife
21:30 (UTC-3)		Report	Gustavo 79'	Stadium: Estádio Adelmar da Costa Carvalho (Ilha do Retiro); Referee: Zandick Gondim Alves Junior

27 February 2022 6	Altos	0–0	Sport	Teresina
18:00 (UTC-3)		Report		Stadium: Estádio Lindolfo Monteiro; Referee: Wagner Reway

5 March 2022 7	Bahia	2–3	Sport	Salvador
17:45 (UTC-3)	Raí Nascimento 55'; Rodallega 58'	Report	Luciano Juba 41'; Pedro Naressi 60'; Rodrigão 90+3'	Stadium: Itaipava Arena Fonte Nova; Referee: Antonio Dib Moraes de Sousa

19 March 2022 8	Sport	3–0	Floresta	Recife
17:45 (UTC-3)	Luciano Juba 6'; Parraguez 64'; Vanegas 81'	Report		Stadium: Estádio Adelmar da Costa Carvalho (Ilha do Retiro); Referee: Tiago Ramos de Oliveira

==== Quarter-final ====
22 March 2022	CSA	0–0 (1–3 p)	Sport	Maceió
21:35 (UTC-3)		Report		Stadium: Estádio Rei Pelé; Attendance: 8,616; Referee: Antônio Dib Moraes de Sousa
	Penalties
	Osvaldo (penalty scored); Wellington Nascimento (penalty missed); Gabriel (penalty missed); Rodrigo Rodrigues (penalty missed)		(penalty scored) Ronaldo; (penalty scored) Vanegas; (penalty scored) Cáceres

==== Semi-final ====
27 March 2022	Sport	3–1	CRB	São Lourenço da Mata
18:30 (UTC-3)	Parraguez 14', 21'; Luciano Juba 82'	Report	Anselmo Ramon 75'	Stadium: Arena Pernambuco; Attendance: 22,483; Referee: Zandick Gondim Alves Júnior

==== Finals ====
31 March 2022 First leg	Sport	1–1	Fortaleza	São Lourenço da Mata
21:35 (UTC-3)	Bill 90+1'	Report	Zé Welison 84'	Stadium: Arena Pernambuco; Attendance: 42,544; Referee: Antônio Dib Moraes de Sousa

3 April 2022 Second leg	Fortaleza	1–0 (2–1 agg.)	Sport	Fortaleza
18:30 (UTC-3)	Yago Pikachu 45+2' (pen.)	Report		Stadium: Castelão; Attendance: 60,045; Referee: Marielson Alves Silva

==== Record ====
Final Position	Points	Matches	Wins	Draws	Losses	Goals For	Goals Away	Win%
2nd	19	12	5	4	3	14	9	52%

=== Campeonato Pernambucano ===
==== First stage ====
26 January 2022 1	Sport	7–0	Sete de Setembro	Recife
20:30 (UTC-3)	Mikael 7', 10'; Jáderson 40', 58'; Gustavo 46', 89'; Luciano Juba 52'	Report		Stadium: Estádio Adelmar da Costa Carvalho (Ilha do Retiro); Attendance: 1,118; Referee: Luiz Fernando do Nascimento Silva

2 February 2022 2	Retrô	2–1	Sport	São Lourenço da Mata
20:30 (UTC-3)	Renato Henrique 22', 54'	Report	Rafael Thyere 87'	Stadium: Arena Pernambuco; Attendance: 300; Referee: Rodrigo José Pereira de Lima

5 February 2022 3	Sport	3–1	Vera Cruz	Recife
(UTC-3)	Jáderson 70'; Flávio Souza 77'; Cristiano Robert 86'	Report	Braga 90+4'	Stadium: Estádio Adelmar da Costa Carvalho (Ilha do Retiro); Referee: Hugo Soares Dias Figueiredo

10 February 2022 4	Sport	1–1	Caruaru City	Recife
21:30 (UTC-3)	Flávio Souza 54'	Report	Gustavo 50'	Stadium: Estádio Adelmar da Costa Carvalho (Ilha do Retiro); Referee: Anderson Luis Marques

13 February 2022 5	Sport	1–1	Afogados da Ingazeira	Recife
17:00 (UTC-3)	Everton Felipe 76' (pen.)	Report	Jânio 50'	Stadium: Estádio Adelmar da Costa Carvalho (Ilha do Retiro); Referee: Gilberto Rodrigues Castro Junior

19 February 2022 6	Sport	2–2	Santa Cruz	Recife
16:30 (UTC-3)	Luciano Juba 64'; Rodrigão 90+2'	Report	Tarcísio 71'; Rafael Furtado 89'	Stadium: Estádio Adelmar da Costa Carvalho (Ilha do Retiro); Referee: Deborah Cecilia Cruz Correia

8 March 2022 7	Salgueiro	1–1	Sport	Salgueiro
19:30 (UTC-3)	Robinho 42'	Report	Bruno Matias 74'	Stadium: Estádio Cornélio de Barros; Referee: Tiago Nascimento dos Santos

12 March 2022 8	Náutico	1–2	Sport	Recife
16:30 (UTC-3)	Jean Carlos 45+5'	Report	Parraguez 79'; Ewerthon 90+6'	Stadium: Estádio Eládio de Barros Carvalho (Aflitos); Attendance: 1,659; Referee: Diego Fernando Silva de Lima

16 March 2022 9	Íbis	0–4	Sport	São Lourenço da Mata
21:00 (UTC-3)		Report	Parraguez 5', 14', 83'; Vanegas 90+2'	Stadium: Arena Pernambuco; Referee: Luiz Claudio Sobral

==== Quarter-final ====
6 April 2022 Single match	Sport	2–2 (2–4 p)	Salgueiro	Recife
20:00 (UTC-3)	Janelson 74'; Pedro Naressi 79'	Report	Patrick Nonato 58'; Kady 86'	Stadium: Estádio Adelmar da Costa Carvalho (Ilha do Retiro); Attendance: 9,081; Referee: Diego Fernando Silva de Lima
	Penalties
	Ronaldo (penalty scored); Sabino (penalty missed); Sander (penalty missed); Luciano Juba (penalty scored)		(penalty missed) Robinho; (penalty scored) Kady; (penalty scored) Danielzinho; (penalty scored) Wescley; (penalty scored) Lucas Franco

==== Record ====
Final Position	Points	Matches	Wins	Draws	Losses	Goals For	Goals Away	Win%
5th	17	10	4	5	1	24	11	56%

=== Copa do Brasil ===
==== First stage ====
3 March 2022 Single match	Altos	1–0	Sport	Teresina
19:00 (UTC-3)	Betinho 65'	Report		Stadium: Estádio Lindolfo Monteiro; Referee: Luiz César de Oliveira Magalhães

==== Record ====
Final Position	Points	Matches	Wins	Draws	Losses	Goals For	Goals Away	Win%
79th	0	1	0	0	1	0	1	0%

=== Série B ===
9 April 2022 1	Sport	1–0	Sampaio Corrêa	Recife
18:30 (UTC-3)	Vanegas 88'	Report		Stadium: Estádio Adelmar da Costa Carvalho (Ilha do Retiro); Attendance: 6,834; Referee: Dênis da Silva Ribeiro Serafim

16 April 2022 2	Guarani	0–0	Sport	Campinas
18:30 (UTC-3)		Report		Stadium: Estádio Brinco de Ouro da Princesa; Attendance: 3,213; Referee: Alisson Sidnei Furtado

23 April 2022 3	Criciúma	1–1	Sport	Criciúma
11:00 (UTC-3)	Marcelo Hermes 14'	Report	Luciano Juba 53'	Stadium: Estádio Heriberto Hülse; Attendance: 11,018; Referee: Leandro Vuaden

26 April 2022 4	Sport	1–0	Ituano	Recife
19:00 (UTC-3)	Bill 81'	Report		Stadium: Estádio Adelmar da Costa Carvalho (Ilha do Retiro); Attendance: 8,455; Referee: Marcelo de Lima Henrique

30 April 2022 5	CSA	1–0	Sport	Maceió
16:00 (UTC-3)	Lourenço 88'	Report		Stadium: Estádio Rei Pelé; Attendance: 5,914; Referee: Paulo Roberto Alves Junior

6 May 2022 6	Sport	2–0	Tombense	Recife
21:30 (UTC-3)	Parraguez 58'; Luciano Juba 75'	Report		Stadium: Estádio Adelmar da Costa Carvalho (Ilha do Retiro); Attendance: 10,067; Referee: Edna Alves Batista

13 May 2022 7	Chapecoense	0–1	Sport	Chapecó
21:30 (UTC-3)		Report	Luciano Juba 12'	Stadium: Arena Condá; Attendance: 3,402; Referee: André Luiz de Freitas Castro

17 May 2022 8	Novorizontino	0–0	Sport	Novo Horizonte
21:30 (UTC-3)		Report		Stadium: Estádio Doutor Jorge Ismael de Biasi; Attendance: 1,084; Referee: Dewson Fernando Freitas da Silva

24 May 2022 9	Sport	0–1	CRB	São Lourenço da Mata
19:00 (UTC-3)		Report	Anselmo Ramon 25' (pen.)	Stadium: Arena Pernambuco; Attendance: 12,864; Referee: Vinícius Gonçalves Dias Araújo

2 June 2022 10	Sport	2–1	Ponte Preta	São Lourenço da Mata
21:30 (UTC-3)	Luciano Juba 49'; Vanegas 51'	Report	Lucca 13' (pen.)	Stadium: Arena Pernambuco; Attendance: 3,051; Referee: André Luiz de Freitas Castro

8 June 2022 11	Bahia	1–0	Sport	Salvador
21:30 (UTC-3)	Vítor Jacaré 78'	Report		Stadium: Itaipava Arena Fonte Nova; Attendance: 27,160; Referee: Bráulio da Silva Machado

13 June 2022 12	Sport	0–0	Grêmio	São Lourenço da Mata
20:00 (UTC-3)		Report		Stadium: Arena Pernambuco; Attendance: 16,506; Referee: Wilton Pereira Sampaio

18 June 2022 13	Náutico	1–1	Sport	Recife
18:30 (UTC-3)	Richard Franco 75'	Report	Kayke 35'	Stadium: Estádio Eládio de Barros Carvalho (Aflitos); Attendance: 6,011; Referee: Wagner do Nascimento Magalhães

25 June 2022 14	Sport	0–0	Brusque	Recife
18:30 (UTC-3)		Report		Stadium: Estádio Adelmar da Costa Carvalho (Ilha do Retiro); Attendance: 10,586; Referee: Edina Alves Batista

28 June 2022 15	Cruzeiro	2–1	Sport	Belo Horizonte
21:30 (UTC-3)	Sabino 26' (o.g.); Daniel Júnior 43'	Report	Kayke 19'	Stadium: Estádio Governador Magalhães Pinto (Mineirão); Attendance: 39,032; Referee: Leandro Pedro Vuaden

3 July 2022 16	Vasco da Gama	0–0	Sport	Rio de Janeiro
16:00 (UTC-3)		Report		Stadium: Estádio Jornalista Mário Filho (Maracanã); Attendance: 60,601; Referee: Luiz Flavio de Oliveira

9 July 2022 17	Sport	2–0	Londrina	Recife
16:00 (UTC-3)	Rafael Thyere 9'; Sander 65'	Report		Stadium: Estádio Adelmar da Costa Carvalho (Ilha do Retiro); Attendance: 16,891; Referee: Douglas Marques das Flores

14 July 2022 18	Operário	0–0	Sport	Ponta Grossa
18:30 (UTC-3)		Report		Stadium: Estádio Germano Krüger; Attendance: 2,960; Referee: Wagner do Nascimento Magalhaes

19 July 2022 19	Sport	0–0	Vila Nova	Recife
20:00 (UTC-3)		Report		Stadium: Estádio Adelmar da Costa Carvalho (Ilha do Retiro); Attendance: 15,518; Referee: Maguielson Lima Barbosa

22 July 2022 20	Sampaio Corrêa	4–1	Sport	São Luís
21:30 (UTC-3)	Poveda 5', 77'; Ygor Catatau 36'; Rafael Costa 90+3'	Report	Kayke 51'	Stadium: Estádio Governador João Castelo (Castelão); Attendance: 2,818; Referee: Vinicius Gonçalves Dias Araujo

28 July 2022 21	Sport	2–1	Guarani	Recife
21:30 (UTC-3)	Denner 5'; Ronaldo Henrique 51' (pen.)	Report	Nicolas Careca 90+1'	Stadium: Estádio Adelmar da Costa Carvalho (Ilha do Retiro); Attendance: 15,.011; Referee: André Luiz de Freitas Castro

2 August 2022 22	Sport	1–1	Criciúma	Recife
21:30 (UTC-3)	Vagner Love 85'	Report	Lohan 38'	Stadium: Estádio Adelmar da Costa Carvalho (Ilha do Retiro); Attendance: 17,189; Referee: Savio Pereira Sampaio

9 August 2022 23	Ituano	4–1	Sport	Itu
19:00 (UTC-3)	Kaio 24'; Rafael Papagaio 38', 49'; Roberto 83'	Report	Kayke 30'	Stadium: Estádio Municipal Dr. Novelli Júnior; Attendance: 1,641; Referee: Héber Roberto Lopes

13 August 2022 24	Sport	4–0	CSA	São Lourenço da Mata
16:00 (UTC-3)	Sander 25'; Giovanni 29'; Kayke 45+3'; Luciano Juba 90+1'	Report		Stadium: Arena Pernambuco; Attendance: 30,445; Referee: José Mendonça da Silva Junior

18 August 2022 25	Tombense	1–0	Sport	Muriaé
21:30 (UTC-3)	Everton Galdino 18'	Report		Stadium: Estádio Soares de Azevedo; Attendance: 898; Referee: Caio Max Augusto Vieira

23 August 2022 26	Sport	1–0	Chapecoense	Recife
21:30 (UTC-3)	Labandeira 69'	Report		Stadium: Estádio Adelmar da Costa Carvalho (Ilha do Retiro); Attendance: 15,128; Referee: Felipe Fernandes de Lima

30 August 2022 27	Sport	1–0	Novorizontino	Recife
20:30 (UTC-3)	Gustavo Coutinho 87'	Report		Stadium: Estádio Adelmar da Costa Carvalho (Ilha do Retiro); Attendance: 19,188; Referee: Rafael Rodrigo Klein

3 September 2022 28	CRB	2–0	Sport	Maceió
17:00 (UTC-3)	Anselmo Ramon 23'; Fabinho 77'	Report		Stadium: Estádio Rei Pelé; Attendance: 6,883; Referee: Leandro Pedro Vuaden

7 September 2022 29	Ponte Preta	1–0	Sport	Campinas
19:00 (UTC-3)	Lucca 11'	Report		Stadium: Estádio Moisés Lucarelli; Attendance: 4,661; Referee: Ramón Abatti Abel

12 September 2022 30	Sport	1–0	Bahia	Recife
20:00 (UTC-3)	Gustavo 65'	Report		Stadium: Estádio Adelmar da Costa Carvalho (Ilha do Retiro); Attendance: 19,589; Referee: Edina Alves Batista

20 September 2022 31	Grêmio	3–0	Sport	Porto Alegre
19:00 (UTC-3)	Gabriel Teixeira 51'; Lucas Leiva 59'; Bitello 73'	Report		Stadium: Arena do Grêmio; Attendance: 24,668; Referee: Luiz Flávio de Oliveira

28 September 2022 32	Sport	2–1	Náutico	Recife
21:45 (UTC-3)	Fabinho 20'; Vágner Love 62'	Report	Geuvânio 6'	Stadium: Estádio Adelmar da Costa Carvalho (Ilha do Retiro); Attendance: 19,521; Referee: Anderson Daronco

4 October 2022 33	Brusque	0–1	Sport	Brusque
19:00 (UTC-3)		Report	Wanderson 89'	Stadium: Estádio Augusto Bauer; Attendance: 2,731; Referee: Raphael Claus

9 October 2022 34	Sport	3–1	Cruzeiro	Recife
16:00 (UTC-3)	Chico 21'; Vágner Love 40'; Labandeira 78'	Report	Bruno Rodrigues 56'	Stadium: Estádio Adelmar da Costa Carvalho (Ilha do Retiro); Attendance: 19,600; Referee: Savio Pereira Sampaio

16 October 2022 35	Sport	1–1	Vasco da Gama	Recife
16:00 (UTC-3)	Labandeira 64'	Report	Raniel 90+5' (pen.)	Stadium: Estádio Adelmar da Costa Carvalho (Ilha do Retiro); Attendance: 19,598; Referee: Raphael Claus

22 October 2022 36	Londrina	2–1	Sport	Londrina
16:30 (UTC-3)	Gegê 52'; Caprini 88'	Report	Vágner Love 39'	Stadium: Estádio Jacy Scaff (do Café); Attendance: 2,054; Referee: Leandro Pedro Vuaden

28 October 2022 37	Sport	5–1	Operário	São Lourenço da Mata
19:00 (UTC-3)	Vágner Love 13', 31', 90+2'; Fabinho 34', 90+4'	Report	Giovanni Pavani 70'	Stadium: Arena Pernambuco; Attendance: 152; Referee: Caio Max Augusto Vieira

6 November 2022 38	Vila Nova	0–0	Sport	Goiânia
18:30 (UTC-3)		Report		Stadium: Estádio Onésio Brasileiro Alvarenga; Attendance: 4,109; Referee: Paulo Roberto Alves Júnior

==== Record ====
Final Position	Points	Matches	Wins	Draws	Losses	Goals For	Goals Away	Win%
7th	57	38	15	12	11	37	31	50%
