= 2023 Campeonato Pernambucano =

Football competition

Campeonato Pernambucano
- Season: 2023
- Dates: 7 January – 22 April
- Champions: Sport
- Relegated: Afogados; Belo Jardim; Caruaru City; Íbis
- 2024 Copa do Brasil: Petrolina; Retrô; Sport
- 2024 Copa do Nordeste: Sport
- 2024 Série D: Petrolina; Retrô
- Matches played: 84
- Goals scored: 198 (2.36 per match)
- Top goalscorer: Emerson Galego (5 goals)
- All statistics correct as of 22 April 2023.

The 2023 Campeonato Pernambucano (officially the Pernambucano da Série A1 de 2023) was the 109th edition of the state championship of Pernambuco organized by FPF. The championship began on 7 January and ended on 22 April 2022. Náutico were the defending champions but they were eliminated in the quarter-finals.

Originally four teams would be promoted from the 2022 Campeonato Pernambucano Série A2 and the 2023 Campeonato Pernambucano would be contested by 12 teams. On 13 November 2022, Central, Maguary, Petrolina and Porto advanced to the semi-finals of the 2022 Série A2 and were promoted to the 2023 Campeonato Pernambucano. However Petrolina were denounced before the Tribunal de Justiça Desportiva de Pernambuco (TJD-PE) for fielding the ineligible player Raykar in the match Maguary v Petrolina played on 8 November 2022 (Third stage, 1st round). Petrolina were deducted four points and sanctioned with a fine of R$3,000 after they were punished, on 22 November 2022, by the TJD-PE and Belo Jardim were promoted instead of Petrolina. Petrolina appealed the decision to the Superior Tribunal de Justiça Desportiva (STJD) and, on 22 December 2022, the STJD overruled the decisions of the TJD-PE giving back the four points to Petrolina and confirming their promotion to the 2023 Série A1 instead of Belo Jardim. Taking into account the possibility of a new appeal that could delay the beginning of the 2023 Campeonato Pernambucano until February 2023, the FPF organised a meeting, on 28 December 2022, with the qualified teams and decided that 13 teams would compete in the tournament including Belo Jardim.

The champions will qualify for 2024 Copa do Brasil and 2024 Copa do Nordeste. The runners-up and the semifinalist with the best performance in the first stage will also qualify for 2024 Copa do Brasil.

== Format changes ==
The tournament will be contested by 13 teams. The relegation stage will not be played and the bottom four teams of the first stage will be relegated to the 2023 Série A2.

== Teams ==
Thirteen teams competed, eight returning from 2022 and five promoted from the 2022 Campeonato Pernambucano Série A2: Belo Jardim, Central, Maguary, Petrolina and Porto de Caruaru.

Club	Home City	Manager	Stadium	Coordinates	Capacity
Afogados da Ingazeira Futebol Clube	Afogados da Ingazeira	Evandro Guimarães	Valdemar Viana de Araújo	7.7587°S 37.6339°W	1,735
Belo Jardim Futebol Clube	Belo Jardim	Felipe Alves	Arthur Tavares de Melo (Bonito)	8.4727°S 35.7350°W	4,000
Caruaru City Sport Club	Caruaru	Thyago Marcolino	Valdemar Viana de Araújo (Afogados da Ingazeira)	7.7587°S 37.6339°W	1,735
Central Sport Club	Caruaru	Márcio Goiano	Lacerdão	8.2786°S 35.9730°W	19,478
Íbis Sport Club	Paulista	Rafael Santiago	Gileno de Carli (Cabo de Santo Agostinho)	8.2768°S 35.0265°W	5,459
Associação Atlética Maguary	Bonito	Nilson Corrêa	Arthur Tavares de Melo	8.4727°S 35.7350°W	4,000
Clube Náutico Capibaribe	Recife	Dado Cavalcanti	Aflitos	8.0406°S 34.8990°W	22,856
Petrolina Social Futebol Clube	Petrolina	William Lima	Paulo de Souza Coelho	9.3902°S 40.5045°W	5,000
Clube Atlético do Porto (Porto de Caruaru)	Caruaru	Oscar de Souza	Lacerdão	8.2786°S 35.9730°W	19,478
Retrô Futebol Clube Brasil	Camaragibe	Dico Woolley	Arena Pernambuco (São Lourenço da Mata)	8.0407°S 35.0104°W	44,300
Salgueiro Atlético Clube	Salgueiro	Marcos Tamandaré	Cornélio de Barros	8.0760°S 39.1216°W	12,070
Santa Cruz Futebol Clube	Recife	Ranielle Ribeiro	Arruda	8.0267°S 34.8933°W	60,044
Sport Clube do Recife	Recife	Enderson Moreira	Ilha do Retiro	8.0630°S 34.9051°W	32,983

== Schedule ==
The schedule of the competition will be as follows.

First Stage
Round 1:	7–8 January and TBD	
Round 2:	11–12 January	
Round 3:	14–16 January	
Round 4:	17–19 January	
Round 5:	24–26 January	
Round 6:	28–30 January	
Round 7:	1–2 February	
Round 8:	4–8 February	
Round 9:	11–12 February	
Round 10:	25–26 February	
Round 11:	11–12 March	
Round 12:	18–19 March	
Round 13:	1 April	
Final Stages
Quarter-finals	5 April	
Semi-finals	8 and 9 April	
	First leg	Second leg
Finals	15 April	22 April

== First stage ==
In the first stage, each team played the other nine teams in a single round-robin tournament. The teams were ranked according to points (3 points for a win, 1 point for a draw, and 0 points for a loss). If tied on points, the following criteria would be used to determine the ranking: 1. Wins; 2. Goal difference; 3. Goals scored; 4. Fewest red cards; 5. Fewest yellow cards; 6. Draw in the headquarters of the FPF.

Top two teams advanced to the semi-finals of the final stages, while teams from third to sixth places advanced to the quarter-finals. The bottom four teams were relegated to the 2023 Série A2.

Top two teams not already qualified for 2024 Série A, Série B or Série C qualified for 2024 Série D.

=== Group A ===
Pos	Team	Pld	W	D	L	GF	GA	GD	Pts	Qualification or relegation
1	Sport	12	9	3	0	29	6	+23	30	Advance to semi-finals
2	Retrô	12	8	3	1	24	5	+19	27	Advance to semi-finals and qualify for 2024 Série D
3	Náutico	12	7	4	1	20	8	+12	25	Advance to quarter-finals
4	Petrolina	12	5	4	3	15	12	+3	19	Advance to quarter-finals and qualify for 2024 Série D
5	Santa Cruz	12	4	6	2	15	13	+2	18	Advance to quarter-finals
6	Salgueiro	12	4	4	4	11	11	0	16	Advance to quarter-finals
7	Central	12	3	5	4	12	15	−3	14	
8	Porto	12	2	8	2	6	5	+1	14	
9	Maguary	12	2	7	3	12	14	−2	13	
10	Íbis (R)	12	3	3	6	13	22	−9	12	Relegation to Pernambucano A2
11	Afogados (R)	12	2	5	5	13	19	−6	11	Relegation to Pernambucano A2
12	Belo Jardim (R)	12	1	2	9	9	26	−17	5	Relegation to Pernambucano A2
13	Caruaru City (R)	12	0	2	10	4	27	−23	2	Relegation to Pernambucano A2

Source: FPF
(R) Relegated

==== Results ====
Home \ Away	AFO	BEL	CAR	CEN	IBI	MAG	NAU	PET	POR	RET	SAL	SAN	SPO
Afogados		1–1	2–0		1–0	1–1	0–1			0–2			
Belo Jardim				1–2				1–2	0–2	0–5	0–1	1–3	
Caruaru City		0–4				2–3			0–0	0–4	0–2		0–3
Central	1–1		1–1		2–1		2–1	1–2					0–1
Íbis		2–0	3–1			1–1	0–4			1–4	0–0		
Maguary		0–0		1–1			0–1	2–1		1–3			1–1
Náutico		2–0	2–0					1–0	0–0		2–0		2–2
Petrolina	4–2		2–0		1–1				1–0		2–2	0–0	
Porto	1–1			0–0	2–1	1–1						0–0	0–0
Retrô				2–0			1–1	0–0	1–0		1–0	1–1	
Salgueiro	3–2			1–1		1–0			0–0			0–1	1–2
Santa Cruz	1–1		1–0	3–1	1–3	1–1	3–3						
Sport	4–1	6–1			5–0			2–0		1–0		2–0	

Source: FPF
Legend: Blue = home team win; Yellow = draw; Red = away team win.

== Final stages ==
Starting from the quarter-finals, the teams will play a single-elimination tournament with the following rules:

- Quarter-finals and semi-finals will be played on a single-leg basis, with the higher-seeded team hosting the leg.
  - If tied, the penalty shoot-out will be used to determine the winners.
- Finals will be played on a home-and-away two-legged basis, with the higher-seeded team hosting the second leg.
  - If tied on aggregate, the penalty shoot-out will be used to determine the winners.
- Extra time will not be played and away goals rule will not be used in final stages.
- The semifinalist with the best performance in the first stage will qualify for 2024 Copa do Brasil

=== Bracket ===
Quarter-finals
3	Náutico	1 (13)
6	Salgueiro (p)	1 (14)
4	Petrolina (p)	1 (5)
5	Santa Cruz	1 (4)

Semi-finals
2	Retrô	3
6	Salgueiro	1
1	Sport	2
4	Petrolina	0

Finals
2	Retrô	1	0	1
1	Sport	2	2	4

=== Quarter-finals ===
Team 1	Score	Team 2
Náutico	1–1 (13–14 p)	Salgueiro
Petrolina	1–1 (5–4 p)	Santa Cruz

==== Group B ====
Náutico	1–1	Salgueiro
Penalties
	13–14

==== Group C ====
Petrolina	1–1	Santa Cruz
Penalties
	5–4

=== Semi-finals ===
Team 1	Score	Team 2
Sport	2–0	Petrolina
Retrô	3–1	Salgueiro

==== Group D ====
Sport	2–0	Petrolina

Sport qualified for the 2024 Copa do Brasil.

==== Group E ====
Retrô	3–1	Salgueiro

Retrô qualified for the 2024 Copa do Brasil.

=== Finals ===
Team 1	Agg.	Team 2	1st leg	2nd leg
Retrô	1–4	Sport	1–2	0–2

==== Matches ====
15 Abril 2023
16:30

Retrô	1–2	Sport
Jonas 45+2'	Report	Fabinho 40'; Vágner Love 90+4'

Arena Pernambuco, São Lourenço da Mata
Attendance: 7,090
Referee: Diego Fernando Silva de Lima

Retrô	Sport

GK	1	(Brazil) Jean	(yellow card) 90+5'
DF	2	(Brazil) Israel
DF	4	(Brazil) Guilherme Paraíba (c)
DF	3	(Brazil) Renan Dutra		(substituted off) 58'
DF	6	(Brazil) Edson Lucas	(yellow card) 69'
MF	5	(Brazil) Jonas		(substituted off) 76'
MF	8	(Brazil) Ratinho
MF	10	(Brazil) Radsley		(substituted off) 76'
FW	7	(Brazil) Gustavo Ermel		(substituted off) 46'
FW	9	(Brazil) Giva	(yellow card) 45'	(substituted off) 68'
FW	77	(Brazil) Fernandinho
Substitutes:
GK	22	(Brazil) Erivelton
DF	14	(Brazil) Yuri Bigode	(yellow card) 90+7'	(substituted in) 58'
DF	26	(Brazil) Bruno Moura
MF	13	(Brazil) Jean
MF	15	(Brazil) Rômulo
MF	16	(Brazil) Hudson
MF	17	(Brazil) Diego Guerra
MF	18	(Brazil) Alencar	(yellow card) 82'	(substituted in) 76'
MF	19	(Brazil) Renato Henrique
MF	20	(Brazil) Albano		(substituted in) 76'
FW	11	(Brazil) William Marcílio
FW	21	(Brazil) Júnior Fialho
FW	23	(Brazil) João Marcos
FW	25	(Brazil) Matheus Serafim		(substituted in) 68'
FW	28	(Brazil) Luisinho	(yellow card) 90+6'	(substituted in) 46'
Coach:
(Brazil) Dico Woolley

GK	33	(Brazil) Renan
DF	26	(Brazil) Eduardo	(yellow card) 50'	(substituted off) 58'
DF	35	(Brazil) Sabino
DF	15	(Brazil) Rafael Thyere (c)
DF	16	(Brazil) Igor Cariús		(substituted off) 74'
MF	7	(Brazil) Fabinho
MF	5	(Brazil) Ronaldo		(substituted off) 73'
MF	10	(Brazil) Jorginho		(substituted off) 90'
FW	46	(Brazil) Luciano Juba
FW	11	(Brazil) Edinho Moreira		(substituted off) 58'
FW	9	(Brazil) Vágner Love
Substitutes:
GK	76	(Brazil) Jordan
DF	2	(Brazil) Ewerthon		(substituted in) 58'
DF	6	(Brazil) Felipinho		(substituted in) 74'
DF	13	(Brazil) Renzo
DF	14	(Brazil) Chico
MF	8	(Brazil) Matheus Vargas		(substituted in) 90'
MF	47	(Brazil) Fábio Matheus
MF	48	(Brazil) Pedro Martins		(substituted in) 73'
MF	77	(Bulgaria) Wanderson
FW	17	(Brazil) Kayke Moreno
FW	30	(Uruguay) Facundo Labandeira		(substituted in) 58'
FW	90	(Brazil) Gabriel Santos
Coach:
(Brazil) Enderson Moreira

Assistant referees:
Ricardo Bezerra Chianca
Bruno César Chaves Vieira
Fourth official:
Paulo Belence Alves dos Prazeres Filho
Fifth official:
Fernando Antônio da Silva Júnior
Video assistant referee:
Tiago Nascimento dos Santos
Assistant video assistant referees:
Francisco Chaves Bezerra Júnior

22 April 2023
16:30

Sport	2–0	Retrô
Vágner Love 21'; Gabriel Santos 84'	Report

Estádio Ilha do Retiro, Recife
Attendance: 26,345
Referee: Rodrigo José Pereira de Lima

Sport	Retrô

GK	33	(Brazil) Renan
DF	2	(Brazil) Ewerthon	(red card) 71'
DF	35	(Brazil) Sabino
DF	15	(Brazil) Rafael Thyere (c)	(yellow card) 33'
DF	16	(Brazil) Igor Cariús		(substituted off) 55'
MF	7	(Brazil) Fabinho
MF	5	(Brazil) Ronaldo	(yellow card) 81'
MF	10	(Brazil) Jorginho	(yellow card) 54'	(substituted off) 55'
FW	46	(Brazil) Luciano Juba
FW	30	(Uruguay) Facundo Labandeira		(substituted off) 12'
FW	9	(Brazil) Vágner Love	(yellow card) 43'
Substitutes:
GK	76	(Brazil) Jordan
DF	6	(Brazil) Felipinho		(substituted in) 55'
DF	13	(Brazil) Renzo
DF	44	(Brazil) Chico
MF	8	(Brazil) Matheus Vargas
MF	47	(Brazil) Fábio Matheus
MF	48	(Brazil) Pedro Martins			(substituted in) 74'
MF	77	(Bulgaria) Wanderson
FW	11	(Brazil) Edinho Moreira	(yellow card) 71'	(substituted in) 12'	(substituted off) 74'
FW	17	(Brazil) Kayke Moreno
FW	53	(Brazil) Paulinho
FW	90	(Brazil) Gabriel Santos	(yellow card) 85'	(substituted in) 55'
Coach:
(Brazil) Enderson Moreira

GK	1	(Brazil) Jean
DF	2	(Brazil) Israel		(substituted off) 77'
DF	4	(Brazil) Guilherme Paraíba (c)	(yellow card) 45'
DF	3	(Brazil) Yuri Bigode
DF	6	(Brazil) Edson Lucas
MF	5	(Brazil) Jonas		(substituted off) 46'
MF	8	(Brazil) Ratinho		(substituted off) 5'
MF	21	(Brazil) Alencar
MF	10	(Brazil) Radsley	(red card) 45+9'
FW	9	(Brazil) Giva		(substituted off) 58'
FW	77	(Brazil) Fernandinho	(yellow card) 43'
Substitutes:
GK	22	(Brazil) Erivelton
DF	14	(Brazil) Renan Dutra
DF	16	(Brazil) Bruno Moura
MF	13	(Brazil) Jean
MF	15	(Brazil) Rômulo	(yellow card) 45+8'	(substituted in) 5'	(substituted off) 46'
MF	17	(Brazil) Diego Guerra
MF	19	(Brazil) Renato Henrique		(substituted in) 77'
MF	20	(Brazil) Albano
MF	23	(Brazil) Hudson
FW	7	(Brazil) Gustavo Ermel
FW	11	(Brazil) William Marcílio		(substituted in) 46'
FW	18	(Brazil) João Marcos
FW	25	(Brazil) Matheus Serafim		(substituted in) 58'
FW	26	(Brazil) Júnior Fialho
FW	28	(Brazil) Luisinho	Sent off (straight red)		(substituted in) 46'
Coach:
(Brazil) Dico Woolley (yellow card) 32' (yellow-red card) 45+10'

Luisinho (Retrô) was sent off after the match

Assistant referees:
Francisco Chaves Bezerra Júnior
Karla Renata Cavalcanti de Santana
Fourth official:
Michelangelo Martins de Almeida Júnior
Fifth official:
José Romão da Silva Neto
Video assistant referee:
Gilberto Rodrigues Castro Júnior
Assistant video assistant referees:
Clóvis Amaral da Silva

Sport qualified for the 2024 Copa do Nordeste.
