= Felipinho (footballer, born 1997) =

Brazilian footballer (born 1997)

Personal information
- Full name: André Felipe Almeida Santos
- Date of birth: 13 January 1997 (age 29)
- Place of birth: Itapetinga, Brazil
- Height: 1.77 m (5 ft 10 in)
- Position: Left-back

Team information
- Current team: Sport Recife
- Number: 60

Senior career*
Years	Team	Apps	(Gls)
2020	Atlético Alagoinhas	25	(2)
2021–2023	Artsul	0	(0)
2021	→ Bahia (loan)	10	(0)
2021	→ Sampaio Corrêa (loan)	5	(0)
2021–2022	→ ABC (loan)	47	(3)
2023	→ Sport Recife (loan)	39	(4)
2024–	Sport Recife	60	(5)
2025	→ Juventude (loan)	11	(0)
2025	→ Criciúma (loan)	24	(0)
- * Club domestic league appearances and goals as of 16 November 2026

André Felipe de Almeida Santos (born 13 January 1997), commonly known as Felipinho, is a Brazilian footballer who plays as a left back for Sport Recife. He won the Campeonato Potiguar for ABC in 2022, and the Campeonato Pernambucano for Sport in 2023, 2024 and 2026.

== Career ==
=== Early career ===
Born in Itapetinga in the state of Bahia, Felipinho signed for Atlético Alagoinhas in late 2019. In his debut year of 2020, he played 28 games across all competitions and scored 3 goals, while his club reached the final of the Campeonato Baiano.

In January 2021, Felipinho signed for EC Bahia – the team that had beaten his former side to the state title – by purchasing 80% of his economic rights for an undisclosed fee. Later in the year, he was loaned to Sampaio Corrêa in the Campeonato Brasileiro Série B and then ABC in Série D. In the Campeonato Potiguar in 2022, he contributed 18 games and 2 goals as his side took the Rio Grande do Norte title by beating América de Natal in the final. Later in the year, his team won promotion from the Campeonato Brasileiro Série C, but missed out on the title after a final defeat to Mirassol.

=== Sport Recife ===
Felipinho reached a deal to join Sport Recife at the end of 2022, but required knee surgery and was not officially presented until the following 24 February. Two days later, he made his debut in the Campeonato Pernambucano as a 71st-minute substitute for Igor Cariús and scored the last goal of a 3–0 win away to Caruaru City. He played six games, including both legs of the 4–1 aggregate win over Retrô, as his club won the state title unbeaten.

In the 2024 state championship, Felipinho scored a late equaliser away to city rivals Santa Cruz in a 1–1 draw on 9 March. His side won on penalties, but he missed the first leg of the final against Náutico due to a thigh injury in a Copa do Nordeste game against Juazeirense; he returned for the goalless second leg that saw his side retain the title. He totalled 45 games, 4 goals and 3 assists in 2024.

For 2025, Felipinho was loaned to Juventude for an undisclosed fee, alongside right-back Ewerthon. Having played 11 times as the team reached the semi-finals of the Campeonato Gaúcho, he was loaned in June to Criciúma for the Série B season. On 18 November, he returned to his hometown due to the death of his brother Victor but returned to training three days later; he played the crucial last game of the season away to Cuiabá on 23 November, in which he was sent off in a 1–0 loss which cost the team promotion.

On 6 February 2026, Felipinho extended his contract to the end of 2027. He played his 100th game for Sport on 5 March by scoring the winning penalty in a shootout victory away to Desportiva Ferroviária in the second round of the Copa do Brasil and won R$1.5 million for his team; three days later he won his third state championship, with a 6–3 aggregate win over Náutico.

== Honours ==
ABC

- Campeonato Potiguar: 2022

Sport Recife

- Campeonato Pernambucano: 2023, 2024, 2026
