= Sabino (footballer, born 1996) =

Brazilian footballer

Personal information
- Full name: José Sabino Chagas Monteiro
- Date of birth: 25 October 1996 (age 30)
- Place of birth: Brasília, Brazil
- Height: 1.85 m (6 ft 1 in)
- Position: Centre-back

Team information
- Current team: São Paulo
- Number: 35

Youth career
- 2009: PSTC
- 2012–2016: Santos

Senior career*
Years	Team	Apps	(Gls)
2016–2020	Santos	1	(1)
2019–2020	→ Coritiba (loan)	85	(11)
2021–2024	Sport Recife	122	(2)
2024–	São Paulo	66	(3)
- * Club domestic league appearances and goals as of 6 April 2026

José Sabino Chagas Monteiro (born 25 October 1996), known as Sabino (Brazilian Portuguese: [sɐˈbinu]), is a Brazilian professional footballer who plays as a centre-back for Campeonato Brasileiro Série A club São Paulo.

== Club career ==
=== Santos ===
==== Early career ====
Born in Brasília, Federal District but raised in Santa Rita de Cássia, Bahia, Sabino joined Santos' youth setup in 2012 at the age of 13. He made his senior debut with the reserves on 30 August 2017, starting in a 1–0 Copa Paulista away loss against Portuguesa.

On 28 September 2017, Sabino renewed his contract until September 2022. He scored his first senior goal on 8 August 2018, netting a brace in a 5–2 away routing of Bragantino.

==== Coritiba (loan) ====
On 28 January 2019, Sabino was loaned to Série B side Coritiba for the season. He made his professional debut on 30 January 2019, starting in a 2–1 Campeonato Paranaense away win against Athletico Paranaense.

Sabino scored his first professional goal on 10 February 2019, netting the equalizer in a 2–2 away draw against Operário Ferroviário. He became an undisputed starter in the club's promotion campaign, scoring four goals in 30 league appearances.

In January 2020, Sabino's loan was extended for a further season. He made his top tier debut on 9 August by starting in a 1–0 home loss against Internacional, and scored his first goal in the category on the 23rd, netting the equalizer in a 2–1 away win against Red Bull Bragantino, through a penalty kick.

Sabino was a regular starter for the club during the 2020 Série A, as the club suffered relegation.

==== 2021 season ====
On 21 December 2020, while still on loan at Coritiba, Sabino renewed his contract with Santos until December 2024. He returned to the club after his loan expired in March 2021, being registered in the main squad for the 2021 Campeonato Paulista.

Sabino made his first team debut for Peixe on 3 March 2021, starting and scoring the opener in a 1–1 Campeonato Paulista home draw against Ferroviária. On 9 April, after the value of his wages was considered too high by the club's new board (the values on the renewal were agreed under the previous administration), Santos rescinded his contract with the club, but also retained 10% over a future sale.

==== Sport Recife ====
Immediately after leaving Santos, Sabino was announced at fellow top tier side Sport Recife. He immediately became a first-choice at his new club, suffering relegation in his first season.

On 4 March 2024, Sabino agreed to rescind his contract with Sport, which was due to expire in April.

==== São Paulo ====
The São Paulo tricolor announced this Friday (03/15/2024) that the defender signed a contract until June 20, with the possibility of extension until the end of the year. He has been free on the market since leaving Sport at the beginning of this month. Sabino is recovering from surgery and is in the process of physical reconditioning. He had surgery on his left foot in December 2023 and will complete his recovery before being available to Thiago Carpini.

== Personal life ==
Sabino's father Kédimo Melo was also a footballer, who notably played for Tiradentes-DF and Portuguesa Santista.

== Career statistics ==
As of 12 March 2024

Club	Season	League			State League		Cup		Continental		Other		Total	
Club	Season	Division	Apps	Goals	Apps	Goals	Apps	Goals	Apps	Goals	Apps	Goals	Apps	Goals
Santos	2017	Série A	0	0	—		0	0	—		21 (Note: Appearance(s) in Copa Paulista)	0	21	0
Santos	2018	Série A	0	0	—		0	0	—		6	3	6	3
Santos	2019	Série A	0	0	—		—		—		—		0	0
Santos	2021	Série A	0	0	1	1	0	0	0	0	—		1	1
Santos	Total		0	0	1	1	0	0	0	0	27	3	28	4
Coritiba (loan)	2019	Série B	30	4	10	1	1	0	—		—		41	5
Coritiba (loan)	2020	Série A	31	4	14	2	1	0	—		—		46	6
Coritiba (loan)	Total		61	8	24	3	2	0	—		—		87	11
Sport Recife	2021	Série A	36	0	1	0	—		—		0	0	0	0
Sport Recife	2022	Série B	37	0	5	0	1	0	—		9 (Note: Appearance(s) in Copa do Nordeste)	0	52	0
Sport Recife	2023	Série B	30	1	13	1	4	2	—		11	3	58	7
Sport Recife	2024	Série B	0	0	0	0	0	0	—		0	0	0	0
Sport Recife	Total		103	1	19	1	5	2	—		20	3	147	7
Career total			164	9	44	5	7	2	0	0	47	6	262	22

== Honours ==
Sport

- Campeonato Pernambucano: 2023
