= Lucas André =

Brazilian footballer

Personal information
- Full name: Lucas André Silva da Costa
- Date of birth: 29 January 2003 (age 23)
- Place of birth: Recife, Brazil
- Height: 1.78 m (5 ft 10 in)
- Position: Midfielder

Team information
- Current team: São José-SP
- Number: 20

Youth career
- 2017–2023: Sport Recife
- 2020–2022: → Flamengo (loan)

Senior career*
| Years | Team | Apps | (Gls) |
| 2021–2026 | Sport Recife | 8 | (0) |
| 2021–2022 | → Flamengo (loan) | 1 | (0) |
| 2025 | → Barra-SC (loan) | 2 | (0) |
| 2026– | São José-SP | 0 | (0) |
- * Club domestic league appearances and goals as of 15:14, 30 June 2026 (UTC)

Lucas André Silva da Costa (born 29 January 2003), known as Lucas André, is a Brazilian professional footballer who plays as a midfielder for São José-SP.

== Career ==
Born in Recife, Pernambuco, Lucas André played for hometown side Sport Recife before being loaned out to Flamengo in 2020. He made his senior debut with the club on 8 May 2021, coming on as a late substitute for Hugo Moura in a 4–1 Campeonato Carioca home routing of Volta Redonda.

Back to Sport in February 2022, Lucas André played for the under-20s before starting to feature with the main squad in the following year. On 17 August 2023, he renewed his contract with the club until the end of 2026.

On 23 December 2024, after being rarely used, Lucas André was loaned to Barra-SC until the following November. After just two matches, he returned to his parent club for the 2026 campaign, but terminated his link on 25 June of that year.

On 26 June 2026, Lucas André was announced at São José-SP.

== Career statistics ==
As of 30 June 2026

| Club | Season | League | | | State League | | Cup | | Continental | | Other | | Total | |
| Club | Season | Division | Apps | Goals | Apps | Goals | Apps | Goals | Apps | Goals | Apps | Goals | Apps | Goals |
|---|---|---|---|---|---|---|---|---|---|---|---|---|---|---|
| Flamengo | 2021 | Série A | 0 | 0 | 1 | 0 | — | | — | | — | | 1 | 0 |
| Sport Recife | 2023 | Série B | 1 | 0 | 1 | 0 | 0 | 0 | — | | 0 | 0 | 2 | 0 |
| Sport Recife | 2024 | Série B | 3 | 0 | 3 | 0 | 0 | 0 | — | | 2 (Note: Appearance(s) in Copa do Nordeste) | 0 | 8 | 0 |
| Sport Recife | 2026 | Série B | 0 | 0 | 0 | 0 | 0 | 0 | — | | 0 | 0 | 0 | 0 |
| Sport Recife | Total | | 4 | 0 | 4 | 0 | 0 | 0 | — | | 2 | 0 | 10 | 0 |
| Barra-SC (loan) | 2025 | Série D | — | | 2 | 0 | — | | — | | — | | 2 | 0 |
| São José-SP | 2026 | Paulista A2 | — | | — | | — | | — | | 0 | 0 | 0 | 0 |
| Career total | | | 4 | 0 | 7 | 0 | 0 | 0 | 0 | 0 | 2 | 0 | 13 | 0 |

== Honours ==
Flamengo

- Campeonato Carioca: 2021
