= Luciano Juba =

Brazilian footballer

Personal information
- Full name: Luciano Batista da Silva Júnior
- Date of birth: 29 August 1999 (age 27)
- Place of birth: Serra Talhada, Brazil
- Height: 1.76 m (5 ft 9 in)
- Positions: Left-back; winger

Team information
- Current team: Bahia
- Number: 46

Youth career
- Serra Talhada
- 2017–2018: → Sport Recife (loan)
- 2019: Sport Recife

Senior career*
| Years | Team | Apps | (Gls) |
| 2020–2023 | Sport Recife | 125 | (21) |
| 2021 | → Confiança (loan) | 16 | (1) |
| 2023– | Bahia | 133 | (22) |
- * Club domestic league appearances and goals as of 04:06, 30 October 2026 (UTC)

Luciano Batista da Silva Júnior (born 29 August 1999), known as Luciano Juba or simply Juba (Brazilian Portuguese: [lusiˈɐ̃nu ˈʒubɐ]), is a Brazilian footballer who plays as a left back or left winger for Bahia.

== Early life ==
Born in Serra Talhada, Pernambuco, Juba earned this nickname (which refers to the lion's mane) in his childhood, as he disliked haircuts and his hair would grow big. In his youth,in addition to playing football, he also worked unloading trucks with his grandfather, or as a bricklayer with his aunt's husband.

== Club career ==
=== Sport Recife ===
Juba joined Sport Recife's youth setup in 2017, on loan from hometown side Serra Talhada. Initially an attacking midfielder, he was converted into a left-back in the 2019 season.

Promoted to the first team ahead of the 2020 season, Juba made his senior debut on 28 January of that year, starting in a 1–0 Campeonato Pernambucano home win against Central. He made his Série A debut on 16 August, coming on as a half-time substitute for Sander in a 1–1 away draw against Atlético Goianiense.

On 21 August 2020, Juba renewed his contract with Sport for a further three years. The following 7 April, he was loaned to Confiança until the end of the season, but was recalled on 26 July.

Upon returning, Juba was regularly used by Sport during the remainder of the 2021 campaign, and scored his first goal in the top tier on 6 December, netting the winner in a 1–0 away success over Chapecoense, as both sides were already relegated. He subsequently established himself as an undisputed starter during the 2022 season, scoring ten goals and being the club's top scorer.

Despite remaining as a first-choice in 2023, Juba failed to agree new terms with Sport, and left the club in August as his contract expired.

=== Bahia ===
In March 2023, it was reported that Juba had agreed to a pre-contract with Bahia. He was announced by the club on 1 September, agreeing to a deal until 2027.

Juba was mainly a backup option in the 2023 season for Tricolor de Aço, but soon established himself as a starter. On 27 December 2025, Bahia extended his contract until December 2029, after a year where he scored seven goals and was the club's top scorer in the league with six goals.

== International career ==
On 3 November 2025, Juba was called up to the Brazil national team by Carlo Ancelotti for two friendlies against Senegal and Tunisia, but remained unused in both matches. The following May, he was one of the names in the preliminary list for the 2026 FIFA World Cup, but was cut from the final squad.

== Career statistics ==
As of 30 October 2026

| Club | Season | League | | | State League (Note: Includes Campeonato Pernambucano, Campeonato Sergipano, Campeonato Baiano) | | Copa do Brasil | | Continental | | Other | | Total | |
| Club | Season | Division | Apps | Goals | Apps | Goals | Apps | Goals | Apps | Goals | Apps | Goals | Apps | Goals |
|---|---|---|---|---|---|---|---|---|---|---|---|---|---|---|
| Sport Recife | 2020 | Série A | 21 | 0 | 6 | 0 | 0 | 0 | — | | 1 (Note: Appearance(s) in Copa do Nordeste) | 0 | 28 | 0 |
| Sport Recife | 2021 | Série A | 14 | 1 | 2 | 0 | 0 | 0 | — | | 2 | 0 | 18 | 1 |
| Sport Recife | 2022 | Série B | 37 | 5 | 8 | 2 | 1 | 0 | — | | 11 | 3 | 57 | 10 |
| Sport Recife | 2023 | Série B | 23 | 7 | 14 | 6 | 4 | 1 | — | | 12 | 6 | 53 | 20 |
| Sport Recife | Total | | 95 | 13 | 30 | 8 | 5 | 1 | 0 | 0 | 26 | 9 | 156 | 31 |
| Confiança (loan) | 2021 | Série B | 8 | 0 | 8 | 1 | 0 | 0 | — | | — | | 16 | 1 |
| Bahia | 2023 | Série A | 14 | 1 | — | | — | | — | | — | | 14 | 1 |
| Bahia | 2024 | Série A | 37 | 3 | 10 | 0 | 8 | 0 | — | | 8 | 0 | 63 | 3 |
| Bahia | 2025 | Série A | 35 | 6 | 5 | 0 | 5 | 1 | 12 (Note: Ten appearances in Copa Libertadores, two appearances in Copa Sudamericana) | 0 | 6 | 0 | 63 | 7 |
| Bahia | 2026 | Série A | 29 | 11 | 3 | 1 | 2 | 0 | 2 (Note: Appearance(s) in Copa Libertadores) | 0 | — | | 36 | 12 |
| Bahia | Total | | 115 | 21 | 18 | 1 | 15 | 1 | 14 | 0 | 14 | 0 | 176 | 23 |
| Career total | | | 218 | 34 | 56 | 10 | 20 | 2 | 14 | 0 | 40 | 9 | 348 | 55 |

== Honours ==
Sport Recife

- Campeonato Pernambucano: 2023

Bahia

- Campeonato Baiano: 2025, 2026
