= Edison Negueba =

Brazilian footballer (born 2000)

Personal information
- Full name: Edison Custódio dos Santos
- Date of birth: 24 October 2000 (age 26)
- Place of birth: Iranduba, Brazil
- Height: 1.67 m (5 ft 6 in)
- Position: Forward

Team information
- Current team: Maringá
- Number: 7

Senior career*
Years	Team	Apps	(Gls)
2020	São Raimundo-AM	9	(1)
2020	Fast Clube	16	(1)
2021	São Raimundo-AM	18	(7)
2021	Fortaleza	0	(0)
2022–2023	Confiança	48	(8)
2022	→ São Raimundo-AM (loan)	0	(0)
2023	Ceará	0	(0)
2023	→ Sport Recife (loan)	4	(0)
2024–	Maringá	102	(17)
2025	→ Juventude (loan)	5	(1)
- * Club domestic league appearances and goals as of 9 November 2026

Edison Custódio dos Santos (born 24 October 2000), known as Edison Negueba or just Negueba, is a Brazilian footballer who plays as a forward for Maringá.

== Career ==
Born in Iranduba, Amazonas, Negueba played amateur football in Manaus before going on a trial at São Raimundo-AM in 2020. After making his senior debut in the Campeonato Amazonense, he moved to Fast Clube for the 2020 Série D, before returning to São Raimundo in January 2021.

On 30 May 2021, Negueba was announced back at Fast, but moved to Fortaleza six days later, initially a member of the under-23 team. On 26 December, after failing to make his breakthrough, he joined Confiança ahead of the upcoming season.

On 27 August 2022, Negueba returned to São Raimundo on loan for the Copa Verde. Back to his parent club for the 2023 season, he became a regular starter before joining Sport Recife on 6 September of that year, on loan from Ceará.

On 6 January 2024, Negueba left Ceará without debuting for the club, and agreed to a contract with Maringá. On 2 September of the following year, after establishing himself as a starter, he moved to Série A side Juventude on loan until December.

== Career statistics ==
As of 18 September 2025.

Club	Season	League			State League		Cup		Continental		Other		Total	
Club	Season	Division	Apps	Goals	Apps	Goals	Apps	Goals	Apps	Goals	Apps	Goals	Apps	Goals
São Raimundo-AM	2020	Amazonense	—		9	1	—		—		—		9	1
Fast Clube	2020	Série D	16	1	—		—		—		1 (Note: Appearance(s) in Copa Verde)	0	17	1
São Raimundo-AM	2021	Amazonense	—		18	7	—		—		—		18	7
Fortaleza	2021	Série A	0	0	—		—		—		—		0	0
Confiança	2022	Série C	8	0	8	1	—		—		—		16	1
Confiança	2023	Série C	19	4	13	3	—		—		2 (Note: Appearance(s) in Copa do Nordeste)	0	34	7
Confiança	Total		27	4	21	4	—		—		2	0	50	8
São Raimundo-AM (loan)	2022	Série D	—		—		—		—		4	2	4	2
Sport Recife	2023	Série B	4	0	—		—		—		—		4	0
Maringá	2024	Série D	21	4	13	1	1	0	—		—		35	5
Maringá	2025	Série C	17	5	16	0	4	0	—		—		37	5
Maringá	Total		38	9	29	1	5	0	—		—		72	10
Juventude (loan)	2025	Série A	0	0	—		—		—		—		0	0
Career total			85	14	77	13	5	0	0	0	7	2	174	29

== Honours ==
Maringá

- Campeonato Brasileiro Série C: 2026

Individual

- Campeonato Amazonense Best Player: 2021
