= Javier Parraguez =

Chilean footballer (born 1989)

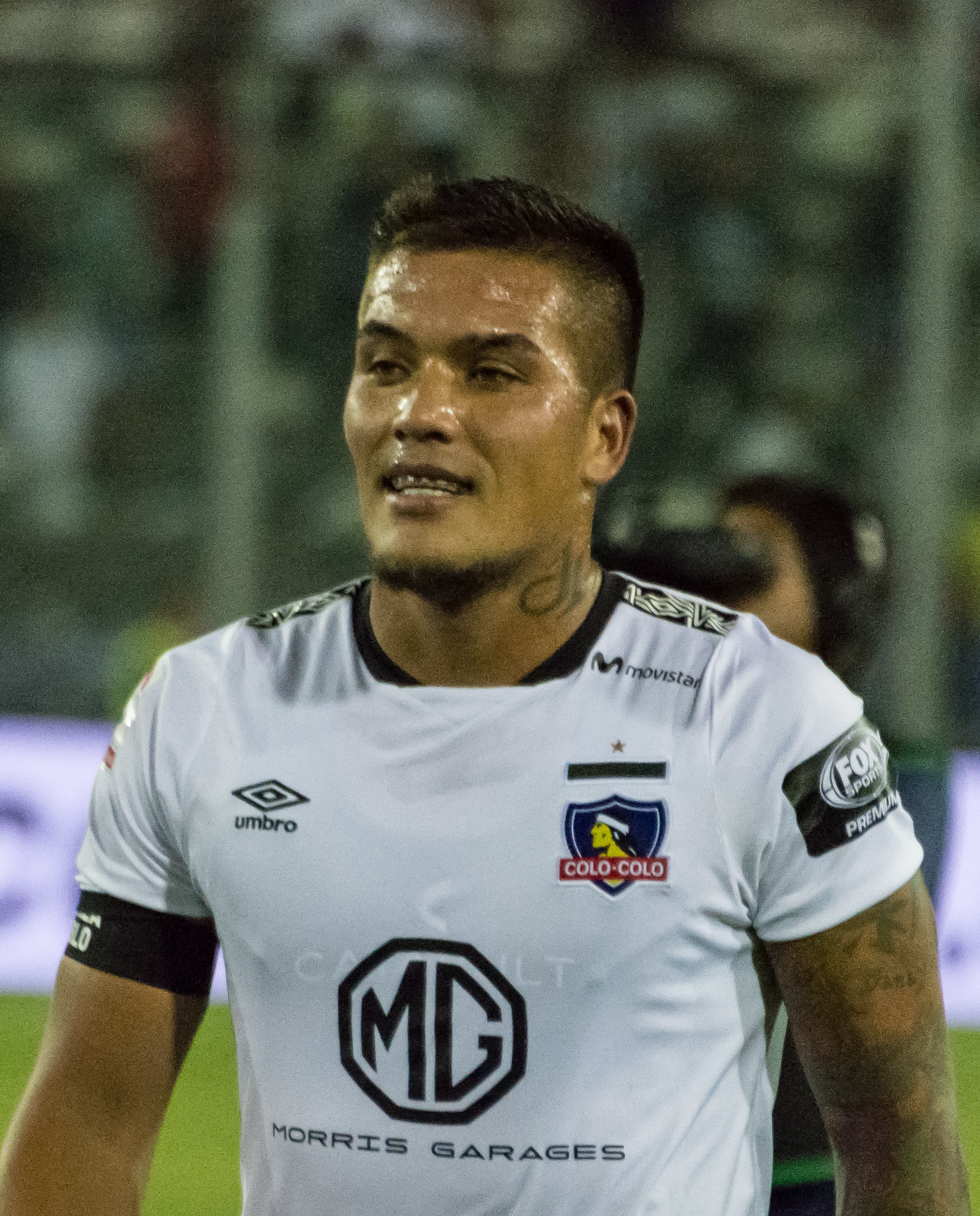
- Parraguez with Colo-Colo in 2020

Personal information
- Full name: Javier Andrés Parraguez Herrera
- Date of birth: 31 December 1989 (age 36)
- Place of birth: Santiago, Chile
- Height: 1.83 m (6 ft 0 in)
- Position: Striker

Team information
- Current team: Santiago Wanderers

Youth career
- Santiago Morning

Senior career*
Years	Team	Apps	(Gls)
2008	Provincial Talagante	–	(–)
2009	Linares Unido	–	(–)
2010	Deportes Melipilla	29	(15)
2011	Everton	9	(0)
2012	Magallanes	22	(1)
2013–2014	Deportes Linares	21	(9)
2014–2015	Deportes Puerto Montt	35	(21)
2015–2018	Huachipato	62	(19)
2017	→ Santiago Wanderers (loan)	32	(10)
2019–2022	Colo-Colo	72	(14)
2022	→ Sport Recife (loan)	21	(1)
2023	Coquimbo Unido	18	(4)
2024	ABC	10	(1)
2024	Cobreloa	11	(5)
2025	Deportes Iquique	6	(1)
2026–	Santiago Wanderers	0	(0)
- * Club domestic league appearances and goals as of 3 January 2026

Javier Andrés Parraguez Herrera (born 31 December 1989) is a Chilean professional footballer who plays as a striker for Santiago Wanderers.

== Career ==
After a stint with Brazilian club Sport Recife in 2022 loaned by Colo-Colo, Parraguez returned to his homeland and signed with Coquimbo Unido for the 2023 season. The next season, he returned to Brazil and signed with ABC in the Campeonato Brasileiro Série C. He ended his contract in April of the same year.

In the second half of 2024, he signed with Cobreloa. The next year, he switched to Deportes Iquique.

In January 2026, Parraguez joined Santiago Wanderers, his second stint with them.
