= Denner (footballer, born 1999) =

Brazilian footballer

Personal information
- Full name: Denner Fernando Melz
- Date of birth: 30 December 1999 (age 26)
- Place of birth: Itapiranga, Brazil
- Height: 1.83 m (6 ft 0 in)
- Position: Midfielder

Team information
- Current team: Novorizontino (on loan from CRB)
- Number: 8

Youth career
- 2007–2010: Juventude
- 2011: Internacional
- 2011–2018: Juventude

Senior career*
Years	Team	Apps	(Gls)
2018–2019	Juventude	53	(3)
2020–2022	Athletico Paranaense	12	(0)
2020	→ Chapecoense (loan)	30	(1)
2021	→ Chapecoense (loan)	18	(0)
2022	→ Sport (loan)	33	(1)
2023–	CRB	13	(0)
2023–	→ Novorizontino (loan)	4	(0)
- * Club domestic league appearances and goals as of 00:47, 26 October 2021 (UTC)

Denner Fernando Melz (born 30 December 1999), simply known as Denner, is a Brazilian professional footballer who plays as a midfielder for Novorizontino on loan from CRB.

== Club career ==
Born in Itapiranga, Santa Catarina, Denner finished his formation with Juventude, after having a three-month stint at Internacional in 2011. In late January 2018, after impressing with the under-20 squad in the year's Copa São Paulo de Futebol Júnior, he was promoted to the first team.

Denner made his senior debut on 25 January 2018, coming on as a second-half substitute for Bruninho in a 1–0 Campeonato Gaúcho away loss against São Luiz. On 15 June, he renewed his contract until 2022.

Denner made his Série B debut on 26 June 2018, replacing Tony in a 1–0 defeat at Vila Nova. He scored his first professional goal on 31 August, netting the opener in a 3–3 away draw against Paysandu.

Denner contributed with one goal in 21 league appearances during his first senior season, as his side suffered relegation.

== Career statistics ==
As of 25 October 2021

Club	Season	League			State League		Cup		Continental		Other		Total	
Club	Season	Division	Apps	Goals	Apps	Goals	Apps	Goals	Apps	Goals	Apps	Goals	Apps	Goals
Juventude	2018	Série B	21	1	7	0	1	0	—		—		29	1
Juventude	2019	Série C	15	0	10	2	8	0	—		—		33	2
Juventude	Total		36	1	17	2	9	0	—		—		62	3
Athletico Paranaense	2020	Série A	0	0	6	0	0	0	—		—		6	0
Athletico Paranaense	2021	Série A	0	0	6	0	0	0	0	0	—		6	0
Athletico Paranaense	Total		0	0	12	0	0	0	0	0	—		12	0
Chapecoense (loan)	2020	Série B	24	1	6	0	0	0	—		—		30	1
Chapecoense (loan)	2021	Série A	13	0	—		—		—		—		13	0
Career total			73	2	35	2	9	0	0	0	0	0	117	4
