= Alisson Cassiano =

Brazilian footballer

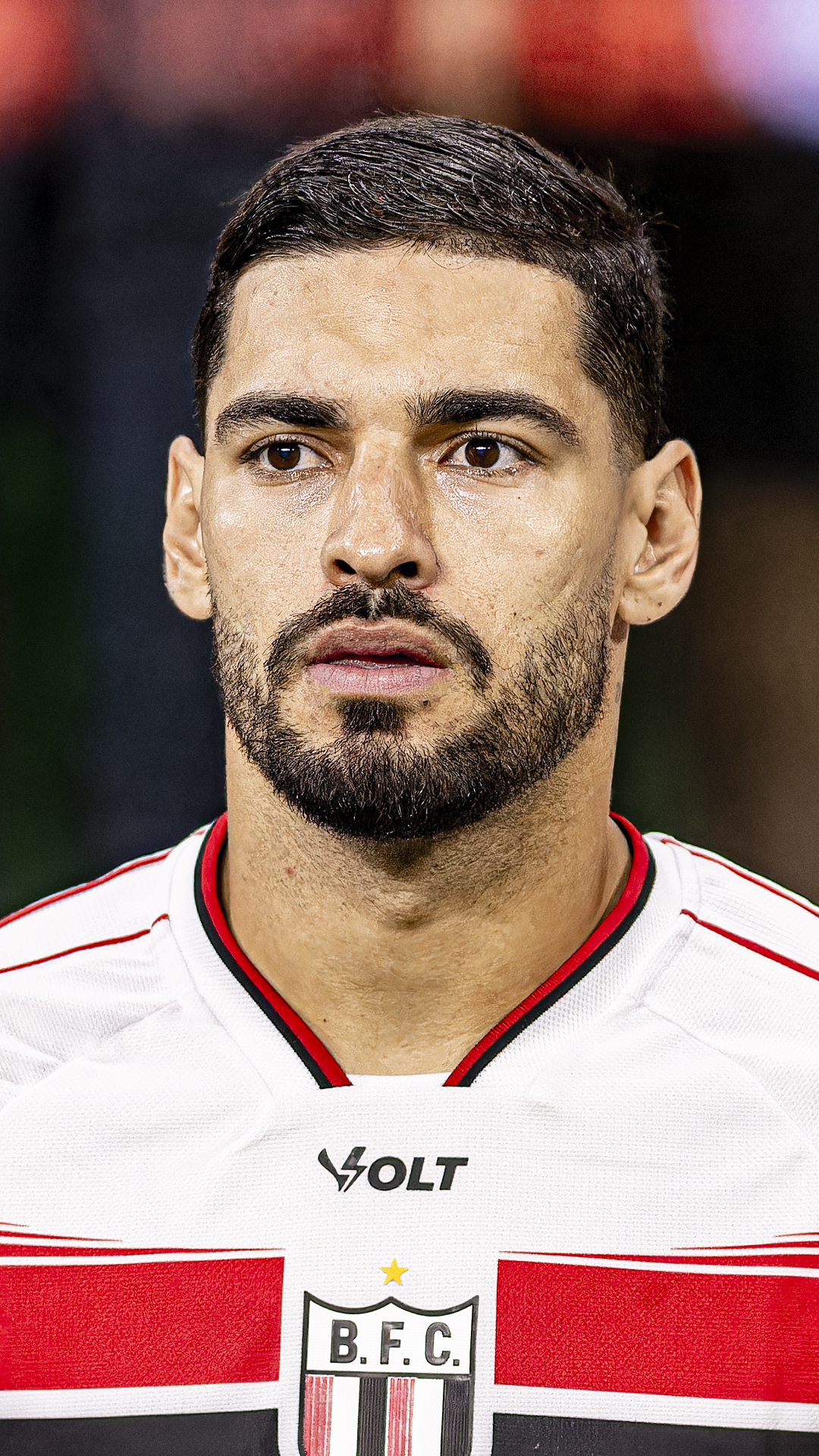
- Alisson Cassiano in 2025

Personal information
- Full name: Alisson Dias Tavares Cassiano
- Date of birth: 28 May 1994 (age 32)
- Place of birth: São Paulo, Brazil
- Height: 1.87 m (6 ft 2 in)
- Position: Centre-back

Team information
- Current team: Brusque

Youth career
- 2011: Santo André
- 2012: Guaratinguetá
- 2013–2014: Joinville

Senior career*
Years	Team	Apps	(Gls)
2015	Unaí	10	(1)
2015	Santos	0	(0)
2016	Portuguesa Santista	6	(0)
2017–2018	Joinville	14	(0)
2019	Moto Club	8	(0)
2019	São Bento	12	(0)
2020	Patrocinense	8	(0)
2020	Treze	11	(0)
2021	Patrocinense	10	(1)
2021	ABC	26	(0)
2022	Vitória	9	(1)
2022	Vila Nova	22	(0)
2023	Ferroviária	10	(0)
2023–2024	Sport Recife	27	(0)
2025	Botafogo-SP	24	(0)
2026–	Brusque	15	(0)
- * Club domestic league appearances and goals as of 9 November 2026

Alisson Dias Tavares Cassiano (born 28 May 1994), known as Alisson Cassiano, is a Brazilian professional footballer who plays as a centre-back for Brusque.

== Career ==
With spells in the youth sectors of EC Santo André and Guaratinguetá, Alisson Cassiano began his career as a professional at Joinville in 2014. He later played for Unaí, Santos B and Portuguesa Santista, where he was champion of the fourth division of São Paulo in 2016. He returned to Joinville in 2017, and in the following years he played for Moto Club, São Bento, Patrocinense and Treze, where he won the state championship in 2020.

After another spell at Patrocinense and ABC in 2021, he arrived at EC Vitória in 2022, but did not stay for more than 3 months, being negotiated with Vila Nova, where he played until the end of 2022. He played in the 2023 Campeonato Paulista for Ferroviária, where he ended up relegated, and in June, he was announced as a reinforcement by Sport Recife, where he was state champion in 2024 and remains to this day.

On 24 June 2024 he scored an own goal eighteen seconds into the match, against Novorizontino. For the 2025 season, Cassiano signed with Botafogo-SP.

== Honours ==
Portuguesa Santista

- Campeonato Paulista Série A4: 2016

Treze

- Campeonato Paraibano: 2020

ABC

- Copa RN: 2021

Sport

- Campeonato Pernambucano: 2024
