= Jorginho (footballer, born 5 January 1991) =

Brazilian footballer

Personal information
- Full name: Jorge de Moura Xavier
- Date of birth: 5 January 1991 (age 35)
- Place of birth: Goiânia, Brazil
- Height: 1.80 m (5 ft 11 in)
- Position: Attacking midfielder

Team information
- Current team: Atlético Goianiense

Youth career
- 2010: Vila Nova

Senior career*
Years	Team	Apps	(Gls)
2010–2012	Vila Nova	29	(1)
2011	→ Grêmio Anápolis (loan)	0	(0)
2013–2020	Atlético Goianiense	259	(46)
2015	→ Seongnam (loan)	16	(2)
2018	→ Al-Qadsiah (loan)	7	(2)
2018	→ Al-Qadsiah (loan)	11	(1)
2020–2021	Athletico Paranaense	6	(0)
2021	→ Ceará (loan)	36	(4)
2022	Atlético Goianiense	62	(9)
2023–2024	Sport Recife	38	(10)
2024	CRB	6	(0)
2024–	Atlético Goianiense	3	(0)
- * Club domestic league appearances and goals as of 1 September 2024

Jorge de Moura Xavier (born 5 January 1991), commonly known as Jorginho, is a Brazilian footballer who plays as an attacking midfielder for Atlético Goianiense.

== Career statistics ==
As of 3 May 2024

Appearances and goals by club, season and competition
Club	Season	League			State League		Cup		Continental		Other		Total	
Club	Season	Division	Apps	Goals	Apps	Goals	Apps	Goals	Apps	Goals	Apps	Goals	Apps	Goals
Vila Nova	2010	Série B	3	0	—		—		—		—		3	0
Vila Nova	2011	Série B	0	0	2	0	—		—		—		2	0
Vila Nova	2012	Série C	14	1	10	0	—		—		—		24	1
Vila Nova	Subtotal		17	1	12	0	—		—		—		29	1
Atlético Goianiense	2013	Série B	27	4	3	0	2	0	—		—		32	4
Atlético Goianiense	2014	Série B	35	8	16	2	4	0	—		—		55	10
Atlético Goianiense	2015	Série B	22	3	—		—		—		—		22	3
Atlético Goianiense	2016	Série B	30	5	14	1	1	0	—		—		45	6
Atlético Goianiense	2017	Série A	35	3	14	5	2	1	—		—		51	9
Atlético Goianiense	2018	Série B	0	0	2	0	0	0	—		—		2	0
Atlético Goianiense	2019	Série B	28	3	14	5	4	1	—		—		46	9
Atlético Goianiense	2020	Série A	5	2	14	5	4	0	—		—		23	7
Atlético Goianiense	Subtotal		182	28	77	18	17	2	—		—		276	48
Seongnam (loan)	2015	K League Classic	11	1	—		1	0	4 (Note: Appearance(s) in AFC Champions League)	1	—		16	2
Al-Qadsiah (loan)	2017–18	Saudi Professional League	7	2	—		1	1	—		—		8	3
Al-Qadsiah (loan)	2018–19	Saudi Professional League	11	1	—		—		—		—		11	1
Al-Qadsiah (loan)	Subtotal		18	3	—		1	1	—		—		19	4
Athletico Paranaense	2020	Série A	4	0	—		—		2 (Note: Appearance(s) in Copa Libertadores)	0	—		6	0
Ceará (loan)	2021	Série A	21	2	3	2	2	0	5 (Note: Appearance(s) in Copa Sudamericana)	0	5 (Note: Appearance(s) in Copa do Nordeste)	0	36	4
Atlético Goianiense	2022	Série A	30	3	13	1	8	2	11	3	—		62	9
Sport Recife	2023	Série B	27	7	11	3	4	0	—		12	3	54	13
CRB	2024	Série B	0	0	6	0	3	0	—		7	0	16	0
Career total			310	45	122	24	36	5	22	4	24	3	514	81

== Honours ==
Atlético Goianiense

- Campeonato Brasileiro Série B: 2016
- Campeonato Goiano: 2019, 2022

Sport

- Campeonato Pernambucano: 2023
