= Chico (footballer, born 1998) =

Brazilian footballer

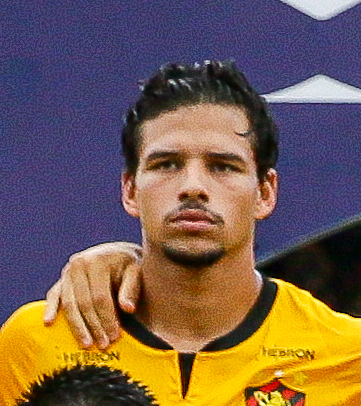
- Chico in 2025

Personal information
- Full name: Francisco Alves da Silva Neto
- Date of birth: 14 September 1998 (age 28)
- Place of birth: Recife, Brazil
- Height: 1.88 m (6 ft 2 in)
- Position: Centre back

Team information
- Current team: Hapoel Tel Aviv
- Number: 4

Youth career
- 2014–2018: Sport Recife

Senior career*
Years	Team	Apps	(Gls)
2017–2025	Sport Recife	135	(5)
2024	→ Novorizontino	13	(0)
2025–	Hapoel Tel Aviv	34	(2)
- * Club domestic league appearances and goals as of 23 June 2026

Francisco Alves da Silva Neto (born 14 September 1998), commonly known as Chico, is a Brazilian footballer who plays as a central defender for Hapoel Tel Aviv.

== Club career ==
Born in Recife, Pernambuco, Chico joined Sport Recife's youth setup in 2014, aged 15. He made his first team debut on 4 April 2017, starting in a 2–2 Campeonato Pernambucano home draw against Salgueiro.

Chico was promoted to the main squad for the 2019 season, but suffered a knee injury in January, which kept him out for most of the season. He still renewed his contract until 2022 in February, and only played for the under-23 side after his return.

Definitely promoted to the first team ahead of the 2020 season, Chico made his Série A debut on 23 August, coming on as a half-time substitute for Sander in a 0–1 home loss against São Paulo.

== Career statistics ==
As of 29 November 2020

Club	Season	League			State League		Cup		Continental		Other		Total	
Club	Season	Division	Apps	Goals	Apps	Goals	Apps	Goals	Apps	Goals	Apps	Goals	Apps	Goals
Sport Recife	2017	Série A	0	0	1	0	0	0	—		—		1	0
Sport Recife	2018	Série A	0	0	0	0	0	0	—		—		0	0
Sport Recife	2019	Série B	0	0	2	0	0	0	—		—		2	0
Sport Recife	2020	Série A	10	0	8	0	0	0	—		1 (Note: Appearance(s) in Copa do Nordeste)	0	19	0
Career total			10	0	11	0	0	0	0	0	1	0	22	0

== Honours ==
Sport

- Campeonato Pernambucano: 2017, 2019, 2023
