= Jordan (footballer, born 1998) =

Brazilian footballer

Personal information
- Full name: Jordan Esteves da Costa Daniel
- Date of birth: 26 February 1998 (age 28)
- Place of birth: Santa Rita do Sapucaí, Brazil
- Height: 1.90 m (6 ft 3 in)
- Position: Goalkeeper

Team information
- Current team: Botafogo-SP
- Number: 12

Youth career
- –2019: Red Bull Brasil

Senior career*
Years	Team	Apps	(Gls)
2017–2020	Red Bull Brasil	13	(0)
2019	→ Votuporanguense (loan)	8	(0)
2020–2021	Santa Cruz	38	(0)
2022–2025	Brusque	37	(0)
2023–2024	→ Sport Recife (loan)	6	(0)
2026–	Botafogo-SP	7	(0)
- * Club domestic league appearances and goals as of 18 November 2026

Jordan Esteves da Costa Daniel (born 26 February 1998), simply known as Jordan, is a Brazilian professional footballer who plays as a goalkeeper for Botafogo-SP.

== Career ==
Revealed by the Red Bull Brasil project, Jordan played professionally for the club until 2020, having a spell on loan at CA Votuporanguense in 2019. He played in the following two seasons for Santa Cruz, and in 2022 he was announced by Brusque, where he was state champion with the club in 2022 and Recopa in 2023. He was announced as a reinforcement by Sport Recife afterwards, participating in the club's state title campaign, having his contract renewed for the 2024 season.

== Honours ==
Brusque

- Campeonato Catarinense: 2022
- Recopa Catarinense: 2023

Sport Recife

- Campeonato Pernambucano: 2023, 2024
