= Gabriel Santos (footballer, born 1999) =

Brazilian footballer

Personal information
- Full name: Gabriel dos Santos Francisco
- Date of birth: 11 August 1999 (age 27)
- Place of birth: Rio de Janeiro, Brazil
- Height: 1.85 m (6 ft 1 in)
- Position: Forward

Team information
- Current team: Seoul E-Land
- Number: 90

Youth career
- 2018: Atlântico
- 2019: Volta Redonda

Senior career*
Years	Team	Apps	(Gls)
2018	Sampaio Corrêa-RJ	4	(0)
2019–2020	Rukh Lviv	7	(0)
2019	→ Kalush (loan)	13	(3)
2021–2024	São Bernardo	4	(0)
2021	→ Caldense (loan)	14	(13)
2021–2022	→ Ceará (loan)	6	(0)
2022	→ Londrina (loan)	28	(4)
2023	→ Sport (loan)	26	(4)
2024	→ Guarani (loan)	6	(0)
2024	→ Paysandu (loan)	8	(0)
2024–2025	Nacional	3	(0)
2025	Chungbuk Cheongju	21	(8)
2025–	Seoul E-Land	21	(1)
- * Club domestic league appearances and goals as of 5 August 2026

Gabriel dos Santos Francisco (born 11 August 1999), known as Gabriel Santos, is a Brazilian footballer who plays as a forward for South Korean club Seoul E-Land.

== Career statistics ==
As of 25 October 2021

Club	Season	League			State League		Cup		Continental		Other		Total	
Club	Season	Division	Apps	Goals	Apps	Goals	Apps	Goals	Apps	Goals	Apps	Goals	Apps	Goals
Sampaio Corrêa-RJ	2018	Carioca Série B1	—		4	0	—		—		—		0	0
FC Rukh Lviv	2019–20	Ukrainian First League	2	0	—		—		—		—		2	0
FC Kalush	2019–20	Ukrainian Second League	0	0	—		—		—		—		0	0
São Bernardo	2021	Paulista A2	—		4	0	—		—		—		4	0
Caldense	2021	Série D	14	13	—		—		—		—		14	13
Ceará (loan)	2021	Série A	4	0	—		—		—		—		4	0
Career total			20	13	8	0	0	0	0	0	0	0	28	13

== Honours ==
São Bernardo

- Campeonato Paulista Série A2: 2021
