= Rafael Thyere =

Brazilian footballer

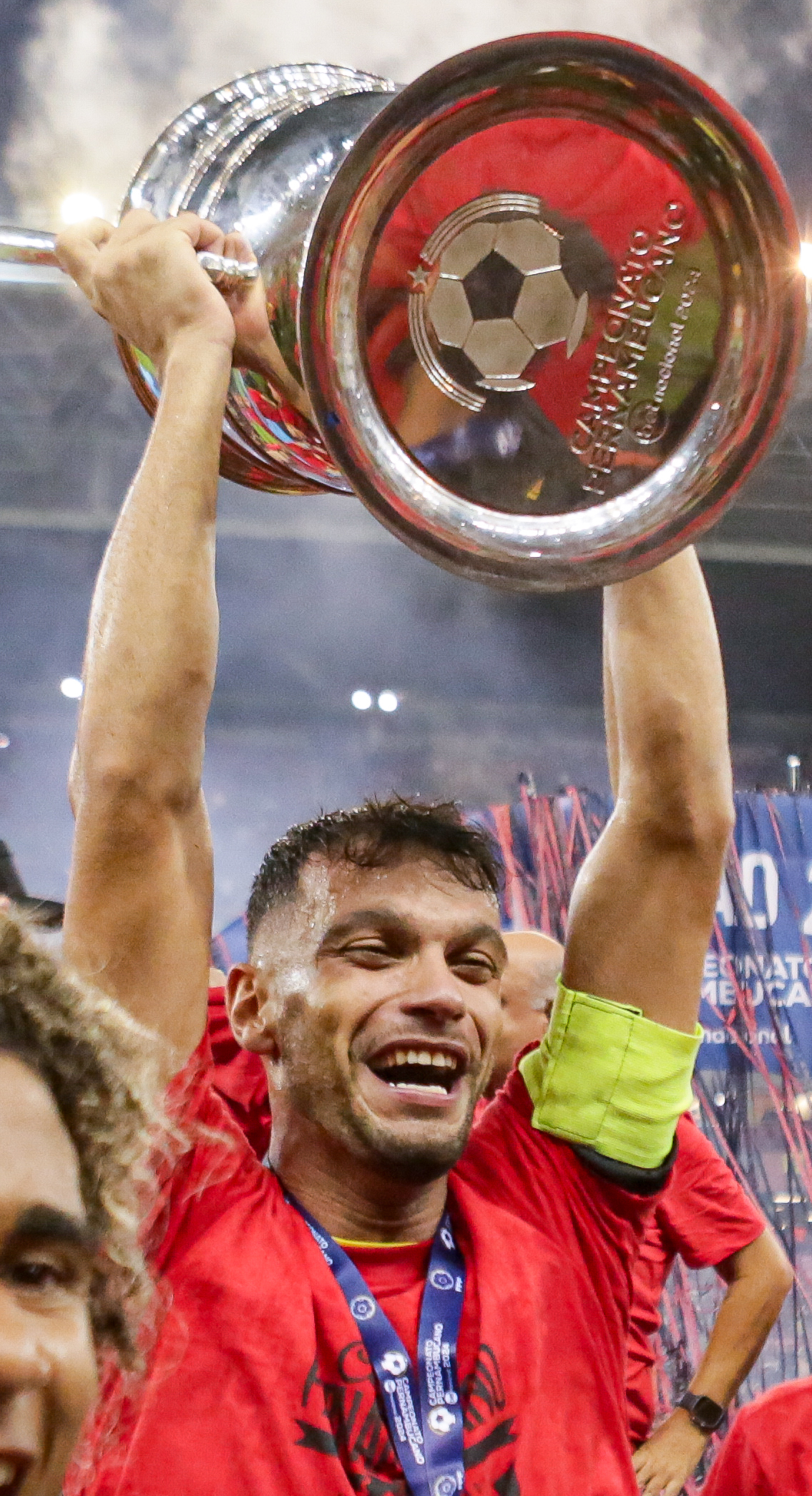
- Thyere in 2024

Personal information
- Full name: Rafael Thyere de Albuquerque Marques
- Date of birth: 17 May 1993 (age 33)
- Place of birth: João Pessoa, Brazil
- Height: 1.90 m (6 ft 3 in)
- Position: Centre back

Team information
- Current team: Chapecoense
- Number: 15

Youth career
- 2006–2009: Paulista
- 2010–2012: Grêmio

Senior career*
Years	Team	Apps	(Gls)
2013–2019	Grêmio	14	(0)
2014	→ Boa Esporte (loan)	0	(0)
2014	→ Atlético Goianiense (loan)	0	(0)
2018	→ Chapecoense (loan)	28	(1)
2019	→ Sport Recife (loan)	41	(1)
2020–2025	Sport Recife	178	(10)
2026–	Chapecoense	1	(1)
- * Club domestic league appearances and goals as of 9 April 2026

Rafael Thyere de Albuquerque Marques (born 27 March 1993), known as Rafael Thyere, is a Brazilian professional footballer who plays as a central defender for Chapecoense.

== Career ==
In August 2014, with the goal of reducing the cast and giving experience to young prospects, Rafael Thyere was loaned from Grêmio to Boa Esporte until the end of the season. Just a month later, in September 2014, Thyere broke his loan contract with Boa Esporte without having played any competitive matches, and signed a new loan agreement until the end of the year, this time with Atlético Goianiense, in search of more opportunities to play.

== Career statistics ==
As of 8 March 2015.

Club	Season	League			National Cup		Continental		Other		Total	
Club	Season	Division	Apps	Goals	Apps	Goals	Apps	Goals	Apps	Goals	Apps	Goals
Grêmio	2013	Série A	0	0	0	0	0	0	0	0	0	0
Grêmio	2014	Série A	1	0	0	0	0	0	3	0	4	0
Grêmio	2015	Série A	0	0	0	0	0	0	0	0	0	0
Grêmio	Total		1	0	0	0	0	0	3	0	4	0
Boa Esporte (loan)	2014	Série B	0	0	0	0	0	0	0	0	0	0
Boa Esporte (loan)	Total		0	0	0	0	0	0	0	0	0	0
Atlético Goianiense (loan)	2014	Série B	0	0	0	0	0	0	0	0	0	0
Atlético Goianiense (loan)	Total		0	0	0	0	0	0	0	0	0	0
Career total			1	0	0	0	0	0	3	0	4	0

== Honours ==
Grêmio

- Copa do Brasil: 2016
- Copa Libertadores: 2017

Sport

- Campeonato Pernambucano: 2019, 2023
