= Fabinho (footballer, born 1986) =

Brazilian footballer

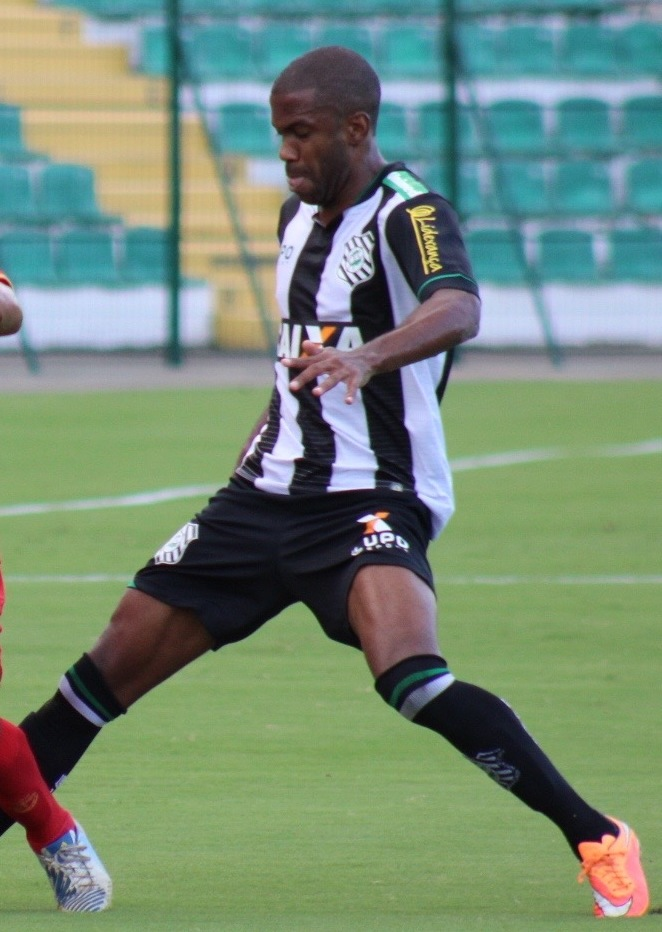

Personal information
- Full name: Fábio Gonçalves
- Date of birth: 19 November 1986 (age 39)
- Place of birth: Cruzeiro, Brazil
- Height: 1.80 m (5 ft 11 in)
- Position: Defensive midfielder

Team information
- Current team: Santa Cruz
- Number: 7

Senior career*
Years	Team	Apps	(Gls)
2006–2007	Camboriú		
2009	Campinense	0	(0)
2010	Baraúnas	7	(0)
2012	Alecrim	23	(1)
2012–2014	América de Natal	136	(2)
2015	Figueirense	46	(1)
2016–2018	Internacional	52	(1)
2018–2022	Ceará	115	(3)
2022–	Botafogo	10	(0)
2022	→ Sport Recife (loan)	29	(3)
2023–2024	Sport Recife	41	(5)
2025	Retrô	26	(0)
2026–	Santa Cruz	17	(1)
- * Club domestic league appearances and goals as of 9 November 2026

Fábio Gonçalves (born 19 November 1986), commonly known as Fabinho, is a Brazilian footballer who plays for Santa Cruz as a defensive midfielder.

== Club career ==
Born in Cruzeiro, São Paulo, Fabinho made his senior debuts with Camboriú in 2006, aged 20. In 2009, he moved to Campinense, and subsequently represented Baraúnas and Alecrim before joining América-RN in September 2011.

Fabinho was promoted with the latter to Série B late in the year, after appearing in four matches. He made his debut in the competition on 19 May 2012, starting in a 5–2 home routing of Goiás.

Fabinho was an undisputed starter for his side during the following years, scoring his first goal for the club on 20 January 2013, netting his side's only in a 1–2 home loss against Vitória, for that year's Copa do Nordeste. On 22 December 2014 he signed for Série A club Figueirense.

Fabinho has appeared in over 100 competitive matches for Ceará over three seasons and winning the 2020 Copa do Nordeste with the club.

== Honours ==
América-RN

- Campeonato Potiguar: 2012, 2014

Internacional

- Campeonato Gaúcho: 2016

Ceará

- Copa do Nordeste: 2020

Sport

- Campeonato Pernambucano: 2023
