= Ronaldo Henrique =

Brazilian footballer

RH Kross
Personal information
- Full name: Ronaldo Henrique Ferreira da Silva
- Date of birth: June 27, 1994 (age 32)
- Place of birth: Recife, Brazil
- Height: 1.77 m (5 ft 10 in)
- Position: Defensive midfielder

Team information
- Current team: Inter de Limeira
- Number: 5

Youth career
- ?–2012: Sport Recife

Senior career*
Years	Team	Apps	(Gls)
2012–2023	Sport Recife	166	(3)
2017	→ Ohod (loan)	10	(0)
2018	→ Ponte Preta (loan)	3	(0)
2018	→ Criciúma (loan)	12	(0)
2024–2025	Avaí	33	(1)
2025	Paysandu	15	(0)
2026–	Inter de Limeira	14	(0)
- * Club domestic league appearances and goals as of 9 November 2026

Ronaldo Henrique Ferreira da Silva (born 27 June 1994), simply known as Ronaldo Henrique, is a Brazilian professional footballer who plays for Inter de Limeira as a defensive midfielder.

== Honours ==
Sport

- Campeonato Pernambucano: 2014, 2017, 2019, 2023
- Copa do Nordeste: 2014
