= Caruaru City Sport Club =

Caruaru City
- Full name: Caruaru City Sport Club
- Nickname(s): Leopardo (Leopard)
- Founded: 19 July 2015; 9 years ago
- Ground: Antônio Inácio de Souza
- Capacity: 6,000
- President: Evandro Marinho
- Head coach: Thiago Marcolino
- League: Campeonato Pernambucano Série A3
- 2024: Pernambucano Série A3, 3rd of 8
Home colours	Away colours	Third colours

Caruaru City Sport Club is a Brazilian football club from Caruaru in the state of Pernambuco. Founded in 2015, the club plays in the Campeonato Pernambucano Série A3, the third tier of football in the state.

Caruaru City joined the Federação Pernambucana de Futebol as a professional club in 2021 and won the Campeonato Pernambucano Série A2 in its first year. It played two seasons in the Campeonato Pernambucano, reaching the quarter-finals in 2022, before relegation and administrative demotion to the third tier for 2024.

== History ==
Founded in 2015, Caruaru City was only involved in youth football until February 2021, when the club joined the Federação Pernambucana de Futebol (FPF) as a professional entity and was assigned a place in the Campeonato Pernambucano Série A2. The club is not a member of the City Football Group spearheaded by Manchester City, but has stated inspiration from it.

In the club's first season, it won promotion to the Campeonato Pernambucano in November 2021, under 300 days from joining the FPF. The club finished 6th in the 2022 season, making the playoffs where it lost in the quarter-finals 3–0 away to Santa Cruz.

In the 2023 campaign, Caruaru City came last of 13 teams with 2 points from 12 games, resulting in relegation. The team declined to join Série A2 due to financial constraints in 2024 and was entered into Série A3, kicking off in September. The team finished the 2024 season in the third division with a record that would have seen it promoted in runners-up position to América-PE, but was one of several teams given points deductions over irregular registration of players; the team fell to third and Águia Futebol Clube de Cumaru was promoted in second instead, in a decision upheld by the Superior Tribunal de Justiça Desportiva.
