= Ewerthon (footballer, born 2000) =

Brazilian footballer

Personal information
- Full name: Ewerthon Diógenes da Silva
- Date of birth: 10 November 2000 (age 26)
- Place of birth: Recife, Brazil
- Height: 1.71 m (5 ft 7 in)
- Position: Right back

Team information
- Current team: Atlético Goianiense

Youth career
- 2013–2020: Sport Recife

Senior career*
Years	Team	Apps	(Gls)
2020–2025	Sport Recife	104	(2)
2021	→ CSA (loan)	6	(0)
2024–2025	→ Juventude (loan)	56	(2)
2026	Portuguesa	9	(1)
2026–	Atlético Goianiense	4	(0)
- * Club domestic league appearances and goals as of 18:20, 16 April 2026 (UTC)

Ewerthon Diógenes da Silva (born 10 November 2000), simply known as Ewerthon, is a Brazilian footballer who plays for Atlético Goianiense. Mainly a right back, he can also play as a right winger.

== Career ==
Born in Recife, Pernambuco, Ewerthon joined Sport Recife's youth setup in 2013, for the futsal team. Promoted to the first team for the 2020 season, he made his senior debut on 19 January of that year, starting in a 1–1 Campeonato Pernambucano away draw against Náutico.

Ewerthon made his Série A debut on 8 November 2020, starting in a 0–0 away draw against Ceará. He renewed his contract until 2024 on 12 February 2021, and scored his first senior goal on 10 April, netting his team's second in a 2–2 away draw against Treze, for the season's Copa do Nordeste.

On 25 June 2021, Ewerthon was loaned to Série B side CSA until the end of the year. Recalled by Sport on 26 July, he finished the year as a starter as they suffered relegation.

On 8 June 2023, Ewerthon further extended his contract with Leão until July 2026. On 20 December, he was loaned to Juventude for the 2024 season.

Ewerthon scored his first goal in the top tier of Brazilian football on 30 June 2024, but in a 2–1 away loss to Fortaleza. On 27 December, his loan was extended for a further year.

On 8 January 2026, Ewerthon rescinded his contract with Sport, and signed a short-term deal with Portuguesa just hours later. On 4 March, he moved to Atlético Goianiense as his link was due to expire.

== Career statistics ==
As of 3 March 2026

Club	Season	League			State League		Cup		Continental		Other		Total	
Club	Season	Division	Apps	Goals	Apps	Goals	Apps	Goals	Apps	Goals	Apps	Goals	Apps	Goals
Sport Recife	2020	Série A	11	0	7	0	0	0	—		1 (Note: Appearance(s) in Copa do Nordeste)	0	19	0
Sport Recife	2021	Série A	18	0	5	0	1	0	—		5	1	29	1
Sport Recife	2022	Série B	21	0	7	1	1	0	—		9	0	38	1
Sport Recife	2023	Série B	27	0	8	1	3	1	—		6	0	44	2
Sport Recife	Total		77	0	27	2	5	1	—		21	1	130	4
CSA (loan)	2021	Série B	6	0	—		—		—		—		6	0
Juventude (loan)	2024	Série A	24	1	5	0	0	0	—		—		29	1
Juventude (loan)	2025	Série A	18	1	9	0	1	0	—		—		28	1
Juventude (loan)	Total		42	2	14	0	1	0	—		—		57	2
Portuguesa	2026	Série D	0	0	9	1	1	0	—		—		10	1
Career total			125	2	50	3	7	1	0	0	21	1	203	7

== Honours ==
Sport Recife

- Campeonato Pernambucano: 2023
