= Wanderson (footballer, born 1988) =

Bulgarian footballer

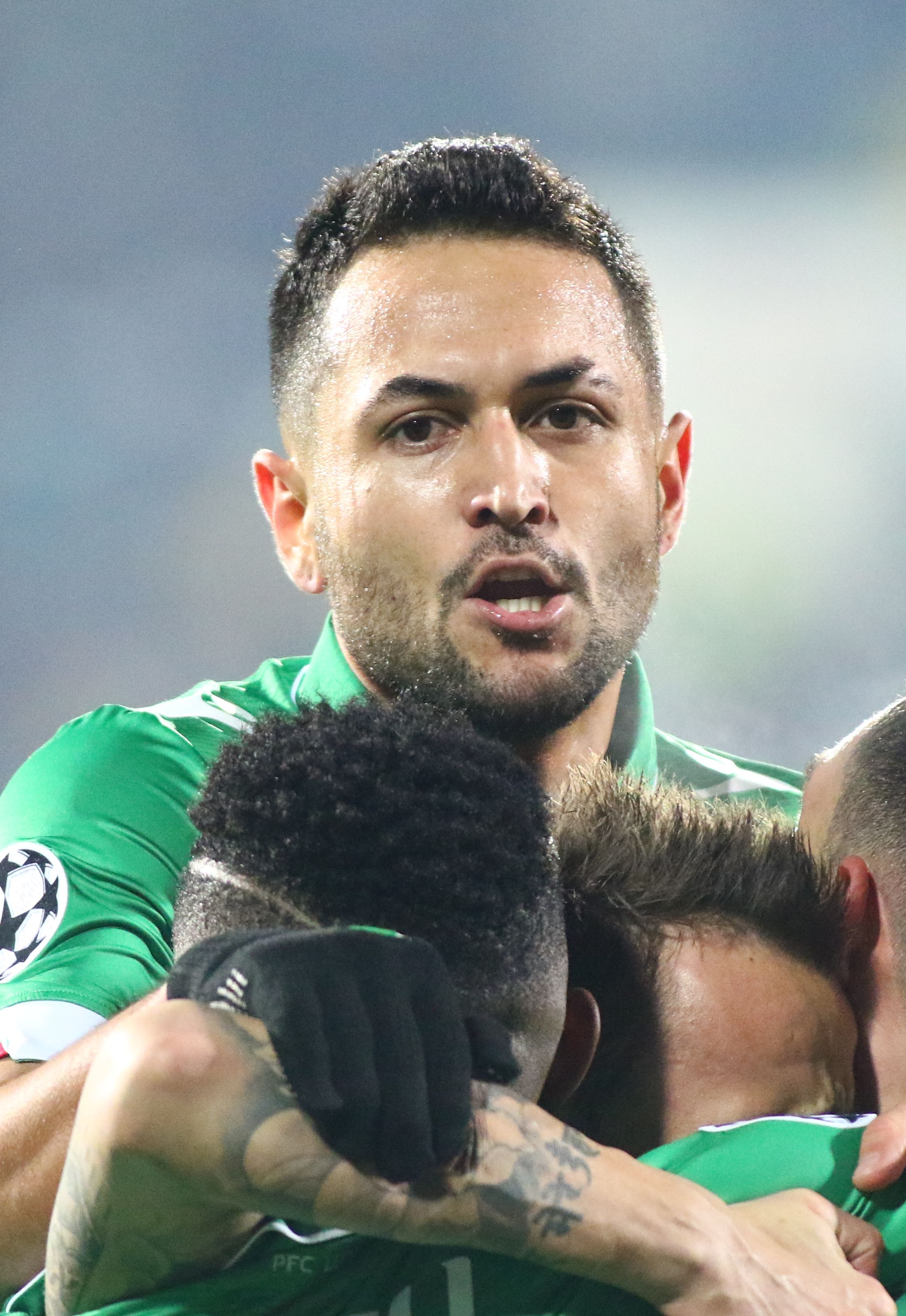

Personal information
- Full name: Wanderson Cristaldo Farias
- Date of birth: 2 January 1988 (age 38)
- Place of birth: Coronel Sapucaia, Brazil
- Height: 1.67 m (5 ft 5 1/2 in)
- Positions: Winger; attacking midfielder

Team information
- Current team: Oeste

Senior career*
Years	Team	Apps	(Gls)
2009	CENE		
2010	Iraty		
2010–2011	Sport Barueri	0	(0)
2011	CENE	8	(3)
2012–2013	Oeste	34	(4)
2013–2014	Portuguesa	16	(3)
2014–2022	Ludogorets Razgrad	176	(53)
2015–2022	Ludogorets Razgrad II	6	(4)
2022–2023	Sport Recife	40	(5)
2024–	Oeste	0	(0)

International career^{‡}
2019	Bulgaria	6	(0)
- * Club domestic league appearances and goals as of 25 November 2023 ‡ National team caps and goals as of 17 November 2019

Wanderson Cristaldo Farias (Bulgarian: Вандерсон Крищалдо Фариаш; born 2 January 1988), simply known as Wanderson, is a professional footballer who mostly plays as a winger, but can also play as an attacking midfielder, for Oeste. Born in Brazil, he plays for the Bulgaria national team.

Wanderson played for several clubs in Brazil, including Série A side Portuguesa, before joining Ludogorets Razgrad in 2014 where he won the Bulgarian League title in each of his eight seasons with the club.

== Club career ==
Wanderson began his senior career with CENE, but later moved to Iraty. In 2010, he signed with Sport Club Barueri. He returned to CENE in 2011, and appeared with the club in Série D, scoring three goals.

In January 2012, Wanderson signed with Oeste, scoring his first goal on 3 February, in a 1–1 away draw against Santos. In the same year he was a part of the team which won the Série C, appearing 23 times and scoring four goals.

On 23 August 2013, Wanderson signed a contract with Portuguesa. On 14 September he made his Série A debut, starting in a 1–2 away loss against Fluminense. His first top flight goal came eight days later, in a 1–0 away win over Internacional.

=== Ludogorets ===
On 27 August 2014, after coming on as a late substitute for Virgil Misidjan, Wanderson scored a last-minute goal for Ludogorets Razgrad in the 1–0 home win over Steaua București to send the Champions League qualifying match into extra time. His team won the penalty shootout to decide the match after field player Cosmin Moți saved two penalties and Ludogorets advanced to the group stages of the tournament for the first time in their history.

On 2 August 2016, Wanderson scored Ludogorets' first European hat-trick in a 4–2 away win against Red Star Belgrade that propelled the Eagles into the play-offs of the Champions League. On 6 December 2016, he scored his maiden goal in the groups of the tournament, giving a 2–1 lead, in the eventual 2–2 draw in the away match against Paris Saint-Germain.

In July 2020 Wanderson received a heavy injury in a pre-season game ruling him out for at least 6 months. He returned in training in February 2021. On 3 March he completed his return in game in a cup match against Tsarsko Selo. Week later he scored the winning goal against Arda Kardzhali in a league match.

== International career ==
Born and raised in Brazil, Wanderson received Bulgarian citizenship in 2017, and subsequently opted to play internationally for the Bulgarian national team. In August 2019 Wanderson received his first call up for Bulgaria for the UEFA Euro 2020 Qualification match against England and the friendly match against Ireland on 7 and 10 September, making his debut in the 0:4 loss against the former.

== Career statistics ==
=== Club statistics ===
As of 7 May 2022

Club	Season	League		State league		Cup		Continental		Total	
Club	Season	Apps	Goals	Apps	Goals	Apps	Goals	Apps	Goals	Apps	Goals
Brazil		Brasileirão		State league		Cup		CONMEBOL^{1}		Total	
Sport Barueri	2011	—		5	0	0	0	—		5	0
CENE	2011	8	3	0	0	0	0	—		8	3
Oeste	2012	23	4	17	6	0	0	—		40	10
Oeste	2013	11	0	18	3	0	0	—		29	3
Oeste	Total	42	7	40	9	0	0	0	0	82	16
Portuguesa	2013	16	3	0	0	0	0	—		16	3
Portuguesa	2014	0	0	13	3	0	0	—		13	3
Portuguesa	Total	16	3	13	3	0	0	0	0	29	6
Bulgaria		First League		Supercup		Cup		Europe		Total	
Ludogorets Razgrad	2014–15	28	8	0	0	5	0	7	1	40	9
Ludogorets Razgrad	2015–16	26	9	1	0	1	0	1	1	29	10
Ludogorets Razgrad	2016–17	31	14	—		3	1	14	5	48	20
Ludogorets Razgrad	2017–18	27	7	1	1	2	0	14	4	44	12
Ludogorets Razgrad	2018–19	29	6	1	0	2	0	13	2	45	8
Ludogorets Razgrad	2019–20	22	5	0	0	2	0	14	1	38	6
Ludogorets Razgrad	2020–21	8	3	0	0	4	0	0	0	12	3
Ludogorets Razgrad	2021–22	5	1	1	0	1	0	7	0	14	1
Ludogorets Razgrad	Total	176	53	4	1	20	1	70	14	270	69
Career total		234	63	57	13	20	1	70	14	381	91

=== International career ===
As of match played 17 November 2019

Bulgaria national team
Year	Apps	Goals
2019	6	0
Total	6	0

== Honours ==
Oeste

- Campeonato Brasileiro Série C: 2012

Ludogorets

- Bulgarian First League (8): 2014–15, 2015–16, 2016–17, 2017–18, 2018–19, 2019–20, 2020–21, 2021–22
- Bulgarian Supercup (3): 2018, 2019, 2021

== Personal life ==
Wanderson has one child from a former wife. He is a devout Christian. In August 2019 Wanderson's reaction after a goal goes viral, since he ran to the tribute to kiss his girlfriend, without seeing the offside flag and that the goal was disallowed.
