= Facundo Labandeira =

Uruguayan footballer (born 1996)

Personal information
- Full name: Facundo Labandeira Castro
- Date of birth: 3 March 1996 (age 30)
- Place of birth: Mendoza Chico, Uruguay
- Height: 1.73 m (5 ft 8 in)
- Position: Forward

Team information
- Current team: América Mineiro (on loan from Defensor Sporting)
- Number: 96

Youth career
- Atlético Florida
- Nacional

Senior career*
Years	Team	Apps	(Gls)
2018–2019	Nacional	4	(1)
2018	→ Progreso (loan)	13	(4)
2019–2021	Danubio	39	(3)
2021	Boston River	29	(8)
2022–	Defensor Sporting	23	(3)
2022–2023	→ Sport Recife (loan)	59	(10)
2024	→ CRB (loan)	28	(4)
2025	→ Vila Nova (loan)	17	(2)
2025–	→ América Mineiro (loan)	5	(0)
- * Club domestic league appearances and goals as of 17 December 2025

Facundo Labandeira Castro (born 3 March 1996) is a Uruguayan professional footballer who plays as a forward for América Mineiro, on loan from Defensor Sporting.
