= 2020 Santa Cruz Futebol Clube season =

Santa Cruz
2020 season
- Chairman: Constantino Junior
- Manager: Itamar Schulle; Lucas Isotton (c); Marcelo Martelotte; Thiago Duarte (c)
- Stadium: Estádio do Arruda
- Série C: 19th
- Pernambucano: Semi-final
- Copa do Brasil: Second round
- Copa do Nordeste: Group stage
- Top goalscorer: League: Chiquinho (8); All: Pipico (12)
Home colours	Away colours	Third colours

The 2020 season was Santa Cruz's 107th season in the club's history. Santa Cruz competed in the Campeonato Pernambucano, Copa do Brasil, Série C, Copa do Brasil, and Copa do Nordeste.

== Squad ==
Note: Flags indicate national team as defined under FIFA eligibility rules; some limited exceptions apply. Players may hold more than one non-FIFA nationality.

No.	Pos.	Nation	Player
1	GK	BRA	Luiz Fernando
2	DF	BRA	Toty
3	DF	BRA	William Alves
4	DF	BRA	Danny Morais
5	MF	BRA	André
6	DF	BRA	Perí
7	FW	BRA	Lourenço
8	MF	BRA	Paulinho
9	FW	BRA	Pipico
10	MF	BRA	Chiquinho
11	FW	BRA	Victor Rangel
12	GK	BRA	Maycon Cleiton
13	DF	BRA	Feliphe Gabriel
14	DF	BRA	Elivelton
15	MF	BRA	Tinga
16	FW	PAR	Derlis Alegre
17	FW	BRA	Negueba

No.	Pos.	Nation	Player
18	FW	BRA	Jáderson
19	MF	BRA	Didira
20	MF	BRA	Felipe Simplício
21	FW	BRA	Mayco Félix
22	MF	BRA	Bileu
25	GK	BRA	Jordan
26	DF	BRA	Denilson
27	FW	BRA	Patrick Nonato
28	DF	BRA	Leonan
29	DF	BRA	Célio Santos
30	FW	BRA	Felipe Almeida
31	MF	BRA	Jeremias
32	DF	BRA	Augusto Potiguar
35	MF	BRA	João Cardoso
38	FW	BRA	Kleiton
39	FW	BRA	Caio Mancha
44	DF	BRA	Júnior

== Statistics ==
=== Overall ===
Games played	47 (12 Pernambucano, 9 Copa do Nordeste, 2 Copa do Brasil, 24 Série C)
Games won	25 (8 Pernambucano, 4 Copa do Nordeste, 0 Copa do Brasil, 13 Série C)
Games drawn	14 (4 Pernambucano, 2 Copa do Nordeste, 2 Copa do Brasil, 6 Série C)
Games lost	8 (0 Pernambucano, 3 Copa do Nordeste, 0 Copa do Brasil, 5 Série C)
Goals scored	66
Goals conceded	35
Goal difference	+31
Best results (goal difference)	6–1 (A) v Imperatriz – Série C – 2020.10.31
Worst result (goal difference)	0–3 (A) v Fortaleza – Copa do Nordeste – 2020.02.08
Top scorer	Pipico (12)

Source: Santa Cruz official website

=== Goalscorers ===
Place	Position	Nationality	Number	Name	Campeonato Pernambucano	Copa do Nordeste	Copa do Brasil	Série C	Total
1	FW	(Brazil)	9	Pipico	6	1	0	5	12
2	MF	(Brazil)	10	Chiquinho	0	0	0	8	8
3	MF	(Brazil)	19	Didira	0	2	0	4	6
4	DF	(Brazil)	2	Toty	1	1	0	3	5
5	MF	(Brazil)	31	Jeremias	1	2	0	1	4
5	FW	(Brazil)	11	Victor Rangel	1	0	0	3	4
6	DF	(Brazil)	4	Danny Morais	3	0	0	0	3
6	MF	(Brazil)	7	Lourenço	0	0	0	3	3
6	FW	(Brazil)	21	Mayco Felix	1	0	0	2	3
6	DF	(Brazil)	3	William Alves	1	0	0	2	3
7	FW	(Brazil)	39	Caio Mancha	0	0	0	2	2
7	FW	(Brazil)	27	Patrick Nonato	1	0	1	0	2
7	MF	(Brazil)	8	Paulinho	0	1	0	1	2
8	DF	(Brazil)	29	Célio Santos	0	0	0	1	1
8	DF	(Brazil)	26	Denilson	0	0	0	1	1
8	DF	(Brazil)	14	Elivélton	0	0	0	1	1
8	DF	(Brazil)	6	Fabiano	1	0	0	0	1
8	DF	(Brazil)	18	Jáderson	0	0	0	1	1
				Own goals	1	1	0	2	4
				Total	17	8	1	40	66

=== Managers performance ===
Name	Nationality	From	To	P	W	D	L	GF	GA	Avg%	Ref
Itamar Schulle	Brazil	18 January 2020	5 September 2020	27	14	9	4	32	16	65%	
Lucas Isotton (c)	Brazil	22 July 2020	22 July 2020	1	1	0	0	1	0	100%	
Marcelo Martelotte	Brazil	13 September 2020	17 January 2021	18	9	5	4	27	18	59%	
Thiago Duarte (c)	Brazil	31 October 2020	31 October 2020	1	1	0	0	6	1	100%	

(c) Indicates the caretaker manager

== Friendlies ==
=== National ===
13 January 2020	Campinense	0–0	Santa Cruz	Campina Grande
(UTC-3)		Report		Stadium: Estádio Governador Ernani Sátyro (Amigão); Referee: José Ferreira de Sousa Neto

== Official competitions ==
=== Campeonato Pernambucano ===
==== First stage ====
18 January 2020 1	Santa Cruz	3–0	Petrolina	Recife
(UTC-3)	Pipico 10', 30'; Patrick Nonato 16'	Report		Stadium: Estádio José do Rego Maciel (Arruda)

21 January 2020 2	Retrô	1–2	Santa Cruz	Recife
(UTC-3)	Jaildo 12'	Report	Danny Morais 56'; Mayco Felix 65'	Stadium: Estádio Eládio de Barros Carvalho (Aflitos); Referee: Gilberto Castro Júnior

2 February 2020 3	Santa Cruz	1–0	Vitória das Tabocas	Recife
(UTC-3)	Pipico 41' (pen.)	Report		Stadium: Estádio José do Rego Maciel (Arruda); Attendance: 6,429; Referee: Rodrigo Pereira

11 February 2020 5	Santa Cruz	2–1	Salgueiro	Recife
(UTC-3)	Pipico 21'; Dadinha 53' (o.g.)	Report	Willian Anicete 2'	Stadium: Estádio José do Rego Maciel (Arruda); Attendance: 3,554; Referee: Paulo Belence Alves

16 February 2020 4*	Central	0–0	Santa Cruz	Caruaru
(UTC-3)		Report		Stadium: Estádio Luiz José de Lacerda (Lacerdão); Attendance: 2,668; Referee: Michelangelo Martins de Almeida Júnior

19 February 2020 6	Afogados da Ingazeira	0–2	Santa Cruz	Afogados da Ingazeira
(UTC-3)		Report	Danny Morais 35'; Toty 62'	Stadium: Estádio Municipal Valdemar Viana de Araújo (Vianão)

1 March 2020 7	Santa Cruz	2–0	Náutico	Recife
16:00 (UTC-3)	Victor Rangel 69'; William Alves 84'	Report		Stadium: Estádio José do Rego Maciel (Arruda); Attendance: 8,155; Referee: Rodrigo Jose Pereira de Lima

15 March 2020 8	Santa Cruz	2–1	Decisão	Recife
(UTC-3)	Jeremias 20'; Fabiano 90'	Report	Aruá 41'	Stadium: Estádio José do Rego Maciel (Arruda); Referee: Gleydson Ferreira Leite

19 July 2020 9	Sport	1–2	Santa Cruz	Recife
16:00 (UTC-3)	Hernane 65'	Report	Pipico 41', 90+5'	Stadium: Estádio Adelmar da Costa Carvalho (Ilha do Retiro); Referee: Diego Fernando Silva de Lima

==== Semi-final ====
29 July 2020	Santa Cruz	0–0 (7–6 p)	Náutico	São Lourenço da Mata
21:30 (UTC-3)		Report		Stadium: Estádio Governador Carlos Wilson Campos (Arena Pernambuco); Attendance: 0 Referee: Rodrigo José Pereira de Lima
	Penalties
	Pipico (penalty scored); Danny Morais (penalty scored); Toty (penalty scored); Fabiano (penalty missed); André (penalty scored); João Cardoso (penalty scored); Célio Santos (penalty scored); Tinga (penalty scored)		(penalty scored) Jean Carlos; (penalty missed) Thiago Fernandes; (penalty scored) Erick Daltro; (penalty scored) Wagninho; (penalty scored) Kieza; (penalty scored) Erick; (penalty scored) Rafael Ribeiro; (penalty missed) Djavan

==== Finals ====
2 August 2020	Salgueiro	1–1	Santa Cruz	Salgueiro
16:00 (UTC-3)	Renato Henrique 14'	Report	Danny Morais 16'	Stadium: Estádio Cornélio de Barros (Salgueirão); Referee: Rodrigo José Pereira de Lima

5 August 2020	Santa Cruz	0–0 (3–4 p)	Salgueiro	Recife
21:30 (UTC-3)		Report		Stadium: Estádio José do Rego Maciel (Arruda); Referee: Diego Fernando Silva de Lima
	Penalties
	Pipico (penalty scored); Danny Morais (penalty scored); Toty (penalty scored); Victor Rangel (penalty missed); André (penalty missed)		(penalty scored) Ciel; (penalty scored) Alison Araçoiaba; (penalty scored) Dadinha; (penalty missed) Ranieri; (penalty scored) Muller Fernandes

==== Record ====
Final Position	Points	Matches	Wins	Draws	Losses	Goals For	Goals Away	Avg%
2nd	28	12	8	4	0	17	5	77%

=== Copa do Nordeste ===
==== Group stage ====
25 January 2020 1	Santa Cruz	0–0	Bahia	Recife
16:00 (UTC-3)		Report		Stadium: Estádio José do Rego Maciel (Arruda); Attendance: 16,106; Referee: Wagner Reway

29 January 2020 2	CRB	1–0	Santa Cruz	Maceió
19:30 (UTC-3)	Rafael Longuine 54'	Report		Stadium: Estádio Rei Pelé; Attendance: 3,100; Referee: Bruno Pereira Vasconcelos

8 February 2020 3	Fortaleza	3–0	Santa Cruz	Fortaleza
16:00 (UTC-3)	David 30'; Wellington Paulista 43', 74'	Report		Stadium: Estádio Governador Plácido Castelo (Castelão); Attendance: 17,627; Referee: Marielson Alves Silva

13 February 2020 4	Santa Cruz	1–0	ABC	Recife
20:00 (UTC-3)	Toty 90+4'	Report		Stadium: Estádio José do Rego Maciel (Arruda); Attendance: 4,784; Referee: Glauco Nunes Feitosa

26 February 2020 5	Santa Cruz	3–1	Freipaulistano	São Lourenço da Mata
19:30 (UTC-3)	Didira 53', 77'; Alyson 67' (o.g.)	Report	Acassio 56'	Stadium: Estádio Governador Carlos Wilson Campos (Arena Pernambuco); Attendance: 3,455; Referee: Ricarle Gustavo Gonçalves Batista

7 March 2020 6	Sport	1–0	Santa Cruz	Recife
16:00 (UTC-3)	Élton 78'	Report		Stadium: Estádio Adelmar da Costa Carvalho (Ilha do Retiro); Attendance: 14,011; Referee: Diego Pombo Lopez

12 March 2020 7	Santa Cruz	3–0	Botafogo–PB	Recife
19:30 (UTC-3)	Pipico 19'; Jeremias 90+2', 90+6'	Report		Stadium: Estádio José do Rego Maciel (Arruda); Attendance: 5,230; Referee: Leo Simão Holanda

22 July 2020 8	River	0–1	Santa Cruz	Riachão do Jacuípe
20:00 (UTC-3)		Report	Paulinho 23'	Stadium: Estádio Eliel Martins; Attendance: 0 Referee: Pablo Ramon Goncalves Pinheiro

==== Quarter-final ====
25 July 2020	Confiança	0–0 (4–2 p)	Santa Cruz	Feira de Santana
18:30 (UTC-3)		Report		Stadium: Estádio Municipal Alberto Oliveira (Joia da Princesa); Attendance: 0 Referee: Leo Simão Holanda
	Penalties
	Reis (penalty scored); Renan Gorne (penalty scored); Silva (penalty scored); Danilo Pires (penalty scored)		(penalty scored) Didira; (penalty missed) Pipico; (penalty scored) Toty; (penalty missed) Patrick Nonato

==== Record ====
Final Position	Points	Matches	Wins	Draws	Losses	Goals For	Goals Away	Avg%
5th	14	9	4	2	3	8	6	52%

=== Copa do Brasil ===
==== First round ====
5 February 2020	Operário–MT	0–0	Santa Cruz	Cuiabá
21:30 (UTC-3)		Report		Stadium: Arena Pantanal; Attendance: 832; Referee: Ivan da Silva Guimarães Júnior

==== Second round ====
4 March 2020	Atlético Goianiense	1–1 (4–3 p)	Santa Cruz	Goiânia
21:30 (UTC-3)	Renato Kayzer 14'	Report	Patrick Nonato 39'	Stadium: Estádio Olímpico Pedro Ludovico; Attendance: 4,887; Referee: Ricardo Marques
	Penalties
	Matheuzinho (penalty scored); Renato Kayzer (penalty scored); Matheus Vargas (penalty scored); Júnior Brandão (penalty scored)		(penalty missed) Chiquinho; (penalty scored) Fabiano; (penalty scored) Toty; (penalty scored) André; (penalty missed) William Alves

==== Record ====
Final Position	Points	Matches	Wins	Draws	Losses	Goals For	Goals Away	Avg%
50th	2	2	0	2	0	1	1	33%

=== Série C ===
==== First stage ====
8 August 2020 1	Paysandu	0–0	Santa Cruz	Belém
17:00 (UTC-3)		Report		Stadium: Estádio Leônidas Sodré de Castro (Curuzu); Attendance: 0 Referee: Diego da Costa Cidral

18 August 2020 2	Santa Cruz	3–2	Treze	Recife
20:00 (UTC-3)	Paulinho 18'; Chiquinho 90'; Toty 90+5'	Report	Erminio 10'; Douglas Lima 74'	Stadium: Estádio José do Rego Maciel (Arruda); Attendance: 160; Referee: Paulo Renato Moreira da Silva Coelho

23 August 2020 3	Botafogo–PB	1–2	Santa Cruz	João Pessoa
18:00 (UTC-3)	Lohan 28'	Report	William Alves 10'; Didira 66'	Stadium: Estádio José Américo de Almeida Filho (Almeidão); Attendance: 0 Referee: José Ricardo Vasconcellos Laranjeira

29 August 2020 4	Santa Cruz	2–0	Imperatriz	Recife
17:00 (UTC-3)	Denilson 19'; Chiquinho 72'	Report		Stadium: Estádio José do Rego Maciel (Arruda); Attendance: 165; Referee: Francisco Carlos do Nascimento

5 September 2020 5	Vila Nova	1–0	Santa Cruz	Goiânia
19:00 (UTC-3)	Biancucchi 8'	Report		Stadium: Estádio Onésio Brasileiro Alvarenga; Attendance: 0 Referee: Emerson Ricardo de Almeida Andrade

13 September 2020 6	Santa Cruz	1–0	Remo	Recife
18:00 (UTC-3)	Elivélton 68'	Report		Stadium: Estádio José do Rego Maciel (Arruda); Attendance: 116; Referee: Diego da Silva Castro

19 September 2020 7	Manaus	0–0	Santa Cruz	Manaus
19:00 (UTC-4)		Report		Stadium: Arena da Amazônia; Attendance: 0 Referee: Paulo Henrique Schleich Vollkopf

28 September 2020 8	Santa Cruz	3–3	Jacuipense	Recife
20:00 (UTC-3)	Mayco Felix 26', 45+2'; Toty 89'	Report	Railan 18'; Dinei 66', 72'	Stadium: Estádio José do Rego Maciel (Arruda); Attendance: 125; Referee: Daniel Victor Costa Silva

4 October 2020 9	Ferroviário–CE	1–3	Santa Cruz	Horizonte
15:30 (UTC-3)	André Mensalão 32'	Report	Pipico 27'; Didira 57'; Willian Machado 90+4' (o.g.)	Stadium: Estádio Olímpico Horácio Domingos de Sousa (Domingão); Attendance: 0 Referee: Alinor Silva da Paixão

11 October 2020 10	Santa Cruz	2–1	Paysandu	Recife
18:00 (UTC-3)	Pipico 33', 55'	Report	Vinícius Leite 80'	Stadium: Estádio José do Rego Maciel (Arruda); Attendance: 122; Referee: Leonardo Ferreira Lima

17 October 2020 11	Treze	0–1	Santa Cruz	Campina Grande
19:00 (UTC-3)		Report	Lourenço 53'	Stadium: Estádio Governador Ernani Sátyro (Amigão); Attendance: 0 Referee: José Henrique de Azevedo Junior

25 October 2020 12	Santa Cruz	1–0	Botafogo–PB	Recife
18:00 (UTC-3)	Didira 18'	Report		Stadium: Estádio José do Rego Maciel (Arruda); Attendance: 156; Referee: Leonardo Sígari Zanon

31 October 2020 13	Imperatriz	1–6	Santa Cruz	Imperatriz
17:00 (UTC-3)	Vinicius 69'	Report	Lourenço 36'; Pipico 50'; Victor Rangel 67'; Toty 83'; Ramon 89' (o.g.); Jáderson 90+2'	Stadium: Estádio Municipal Frei Epifânio d’Abadia; Attendance: 0 Referee: Rejane Caetano da Silva

7 November 2020 14	Santa Cruz	2–0	Vila Nova	Recife
19:00 (UTC-3)	Lourenço 27'; Chiquinho 45'	Report		Stadium: Estádio José do Rego Maciel (Arruda); Attendance: 125; Referee: Felipe da Silva Gonçalves Paludo

13 November 2020 15	Remo	0–2	Santa Cruz	Belém
20:00 (UTC-3)		Report	Jeremias 58'; Caio Mancha 90'	Stadium: Estádio Olímpico do Pará (Mangueirão); Attendance: 0 Referee: Rafael Martins de Sá

21 November 2020 16	Santa Cruz	1–2	Manaus	Recife
19:00 (UTC-3)	Chiquinho 84'	Report	Hamilton 56', 66'	Stadium: Estádio José do Rego Maciel (Arruda); Attendance: 135; Referee: Leandro Bizzio Marinho

30 November 2020 17	Jacuipense	1–0	Santa Cruz	Salvador
20:00 (UTC-3)	Levi 80'	Report		Stadium: Estádio Governador Roberto Santos (Pituaçu); Attendance: 0 Referee: João Ennio Sobral

5 December 2020 18	Santa Cruz	3–3	Ferroviário–CE	Recife
17:00 (UTC-3)	Célio Santos 61'; Caio Mancha 65'; Chiquinho 74'	Report	Willian Lira 52', 59'; Júnior Batista 83'	Stadium: Estádio José do Rego Maciel (Arruda); Attendance: 149; Referee: Wagner Francisco Silva Souza

==== Second stage ====
13 December 2020 1	Brusque	0–0	Santa Cruz	Brusque
20:00 (UTC-3)		Report		Stadium: Estádio Augusto Bauer; Attendance: 37; Referee: Alexandre Vargas Tavares de Jesus

19 December 2020 2	Santa Cruz	1–2	Vila Nova	Recife
17:00 (UTC-3)	Victor Rangel 80'	Report	Henan 24'; Rafhael Lucas 78'	Stadium: Estádio José do Rego Maciel (Arruda); Attendance: 171; Referee: Dyorgines Jose Padovani de Andrade

26 December 2020 3	Ituano	1–2	Santa Cruz	Itu
19:00 (UTC-3)	Pacheco 30'	Report	Chiquinho 46', 90+2'	Stadium: Estádio Municipal Dr. Novelli Júnior; Attendance: 0 Referee: Igor Junio Benevenuto de Oliveira

3 January 2021 4	Santa Cruz	1–1	Ituano	Recife
18:00 (UTC-3)	Didira 23'	Report	André Castro 77'	Stadium: Estádio José do Rego Maciel (Arruda); Attendance: 169; Referee: Daniel Nobre Bins

9 January 2021 5	Vila Nova	2–1	Santa Cruz	Goiânia
17:00 (UTC-3)	Alan Mineiro 10'; Pedro Bambú 79'	Report	Chiquinho 90+4'	Stadium: Estádio Onésio Brasileiro Alvarenga; Attendance: 0 Referee: Rodolpho Toski Marques

17 January 2021 6	Santa Cruz	3–1	Brusque	Recife
18:00 (UTC-3)	Pipico 13'; Victor Rangel 31'; William Alves 60'	Report	Thiago Alagoano 74'	Stadium: Estádio José do Rego Maciel (Arruda); Attendance: 135; Referee: Wagner do Nascimento Magalhães

==== Record ====
Final Position	Points	Matches	Wins	Draws	Losses	Goals For	Goals Away	Avg%
5th	45	24	13	6	5	40	23	62%
