= 2021 Santa Cruz Futebol Clube season =

Santa Cruz
2021 season
- Chairman: Joaquim Bezerra
- Manager: Marcelo Martelotte; João Brigatti; Bazílio Amaral (c); Roberto de Jesus (c); Alexandre Gallo; Bolívar; Roberto Fernandes
- Stadium: Estádio do Arruda
- Série C: 19th
- Pernambucano: Semi-final
- Copa do Brasil: Second round
- Copa do Nordeste: Group stage
- Top goalscorer: League: Pipico (6); All: Pipico (10)
Home colours	Away colours

The 2021 season was Santa Cruz's 108th season in the club's history. Santa Cruz competed in the Campeonato Pernambucano, Série C and Copa do Nordeste.

== Squad ==
Note: Flags indicate national team as defined under FIFA eligibility rules; some limited exceptions apply. Players may hold more than one non-FIFA nationality.

No.	Pos.	Nation	Player
1	GK	BRA	Luiz Fernando
2	DF	BRA	Toty
3	DF	BRA	William Alves
4	DF	BRA	Danny Morais
5	MF	BRA	André
6	DF	BRA	Perí
7	FW	BRA	Lourenço
8	MF	BRA	Paulinho
9	FW	BRA	Pipico
10	MF	BRA	Chiquinho
11	FW	BRA	Victor Rangel
12	GK	BRA	Maycon Cleiton
13	DF	BRA	Feliphe Gabriel
14	DF	BRA	Elivelton
15	MF	BRA	Tinga
16	FW	PAR	Derlis Alegre
17	FW	BRA	Negueba

No.	Pos.	Nation	Player
18	FW	BRA	Jáderson
19	MF	BRA	Didira
20	MF	BRA	Felipe Simplício
21	FW	BRA	Mayco Félix
22	MF	BRA	Bileu
25	GK	BRA	Jordan
26	DF	BRA	Denilson
27	FW	BRA	Patrick Nonato
28	DF	BRA	Leonan
29	DF	BRA	Célio Santos
30	FW	BRA	Felipe Almeida
31	MF	BRA	Jeremias
32	DF	BRA	Augusto Potiguar
35	MF	BRA	João Cardoso
38	FW	BRA	Kleiton
39	FW	BRA	Caio Mancha
44	DF	BRA	Júnior

== Statistics ==
=== Overall ===
Games played	41 (10 Copa do Nordeste, 11 Pernambucano, 2 Copa do Brasil, 18 Série C)
Games won	8 (2 Copa do Nordeste, 3 Pernambucano, 1 Copa do Brasil, 2 Série C)
Games drawn	12 (1 Copa do Nordeste, 5 Pernambucano, 0 Copa do Brasil, 6 Série C)
Games lost	21 (7 Copa do Nordeste, 3 Pernambucano, 1 Copa do Brasil, 10 Série C)
Goals scored	35
Goals conceded	44
Goal difference	–9
Best results (goal difference)	4–0 (A) v Ypiranga – Copa do Brasil – 2021.03.26
Worst result (goal difference)	0–2 (A) v Vitória – Copa do Nordeste – 2021.02.27; 0–2 (A) v Altos – Copa do Nordeste – 2021.04.04; 0–2 (H) v Sete de Setembro – Pernambucano – 2021.04.25; 0–2 (A) v Manaus – Série C – 2021.05.30
Top scorer	Pipico (10)

Source: Santa Cruz official website

=== Goalscorers ===
Place	Position	Nationality	Number	Name	Copa do Nordeste	Campeonato Pernambucano	Copa do Brasil	Série C	Total
1	FW	(Brazil)	9	Pipico	0	2	2	6	10
2	MF	(Brazil)	10	Chiquinho	3	2	1	0	6
3	DF	(Brazil)	16	Eduardo Soares	0	3	0	1	4
4	FW	(Brazil)	22	Léo Gaúcho	0	2	0	1	3
5	FW	(Brazil)	11	Victor Rangel	2	0	0	0	2
5	DF	(Brazil)	3	William Alves	0	2	0	0	2
6	DF	(Brazil)	6	Alan Cardoso	0	0	1	0	1
6	DF	(Brazil)	22	Breno Calixto	0	0	0	1	1
6	MF	(Brazil)	15	Elicarlos	0	1	0	0	1
6	DF	(Brazil)	14	Junior Sergipano	1	0	0	0	1
6	MF	(Brazil)	7	Lourenço	1	0	0	0	1
6	FW	(Brazil)	26	Lucas Batatinha	0	0	0	1	1
6	DF	(Brazil)	3	Rafael Castro	0	0	0	1	1
				Own goals	0	1	0	0	1
				Total	7	13	4	11	35

=== Managers performance ===
Name	Nationality	From	To	P	W	D	L	GF	GA	Avg%	Ref
Marcelo Martelotte	Brazil	26 January 2021	2 February 2021	2	1	1	0	4	2	66%	
João Brigatti	Brazil	24 February 2021	10 April 2021	11	4	2	5	15	12	42%	
Bazílio Amaral (c)	Brazil	7 March 2021	11 March 2021	2	0	0	2	0	2	0%	
Roberto de Jesus (c)	Brazil	13 April 2021	14 June 2021	3	1	0	2	3	4	33%	
Alexandre Gallo	Brazil	18 April 2021	25 April 2021	3	0	1	2	1	4	11%	
Bolívar	Brazil	2 May 2021	5 June 2021	5	0	3	2	1	4	20%	
Roberto Fernandes	Brazil	21 June 2021	25 September 2021	15	2	5	8	11	16	24%	

(c) Indicates the caretaker manager

== Official competitions ==
=== Copa do Nordeste ===
==== Preliminary stage ====
26 January 2021	Itabaiana	2–2	Santa Cruz	Recife
(UTC-3)	Diego Bispo 48'; Ila 53'	Report	Victor Rangel 31', 67'	Stadium: Estádio José do Rego Maciel (Arruda); Referee: Francisco Carlos do Nascimento

2 February 2021	Santa Cruz	2–0	Itabaiana	Itabaiana
(UTC-3)	Chiquinho 42'; Lourenço 59'	Report		Stadium: Estádio Etelvino Mendonça; Referee: José Henrique de Azevedo Junior

==== Group stage ====
27 February 2021 1	Vitória	2–0	Santa Cruz	Salvador
16:00 (UTC-3)	Edvan 70'; Fernando Neto 83'	Report		Stadium: Estádio Manoel Barradas (Barradão); Attendance: 0 Referee: José Ricardo Vasconcellos Laranjeira

7 March 2021 2	Santa Cruz	0–1	ABC	Recife
16:00 (UTC-3)		Report	Wallyson 82'	Stadium: Estádio José do Rego Maciel (Arruda); Attendance: 219; Referee: Maykon Matos Nunes

11 March 2021 3	Salgueiro	1–0	Santa Cruz	Salgueiro
18:00 (UTC-3)	Leozão 3'	Report		Stadium: Estádio Cornélio de Barros; Attendance: 146; Referee: Diego Pombo Lopez

20 March 2021 4	Santa Cruz	1–2	CSA	Recife
18:15 (UTC-3)	Chiquinho 86'	Report	Dellatorre 5', 52'	Stadium: Estádio José do Rego Maciel (Arruda); Attendance: 134; Referee: Leandro Bizzio Marinho

23 March 2021 5	Fortaleza	0–1	Santa Cruz	Fortaleza
21:30 (UTC-3)		Report	Junior Sergipano 68'	Stadium: Estádio Governador Plácido Castelo (Castelão); Attendance: 0 Referee: José Ricardo Vasconcellos Laranjeira

31 March 2021 6	Santa Cruz	1–2	Sport	Recife
21:30 (UTC-3)	Chiquinho 63' (pen.)	Report	Rafael Thyere 36'; Jonas Toró 90+6'	Stadium: Estádio José do Rego Maciel (Arruda); Attendance: 135; Referee: Wagner Reway

4 April 2021 7	Altos	2–0	Santa Cruz	Teresina
15:45 (UTC-3)	Juninho 35'; Leandro 48'	Report		Stadium: Estádio Governador Alberto Tavares Silva (Albertão); Attendance: 0 Referee: José Henrique de Azevedo Junior

10 April 2021 8	Santa Cruz	0–1	Botafogo–PB	Recife
18:15 (UTC-3)		Report	Lucas Gabriel 78'	Stadium: Estádio José do Rego Maciel (Arruda); Attendance: 149; Referee: Thayslane de Melo Costa

==== Record ====
Final Position	Points	Matches	Wins	Draws	Losses	Goals For	Goals Away	Avg%
16th	7	10	2	1	7	7	13	23%

=== Campeonato Pernambucano ===
==== First stage ====
24 February 2021 1	Santa Cruz	2–0	Vitória das Tabocas	Recife
(UTC-3)	Pipico 41'; Léo Gaúcho 81'	Report		Stadium: Estádio José do Rego Maciel (Arruda)

3 March 2021 2	Central	1–1	Santa Cruz	Caruaru
(UTC-3)	Júnior Lemos 55' (pen.)	Report	Eduardo Soares 24'	Stadium: Estádio Luiz José de Lacerda (Lacerdão); Referee: José Woshington da Silva

14 March 2021 3	Santa Cruz	1–1	Sport	Recife
16:00 (UTC-3)	Pipico 84'	Report	Mikael 31'	Stadium: Estádio José do Rego Maciel (Arruda); Referee: Deborah Cecília

7 April 2021 5	Santa Cruz	4–1	Vera Cruz	Recife
(UTC-3)	William Alves 14', 84'; Eduardo Soares 87'; Chiquinho 90+5'	Report	Vitor Leão 72'	Stadium: Estádio José do Rego Maciel (Arruda); Referee: César Pereira Leite

18 April 2021 6	Náutico	2–1	Santa Cruz	Recife
16:00 (UTC-3)	Rhaldney 2'; Vinícius 27'	Report	Léo Gaúcho 52'	Stadium: Estádio Eládio de Barros Carvalho (Aflitos); Referee: Diego Fernando Silva de Lima

21 April 2021 7	Santa Cruz	0–0	Salgueiro	Recife
(UTC-3)		Report		Stadium: Estádio José do Rego Maciel (Arruda); Referee: Tiago Nascimento dos Santos

25 April 2021 8	Santa Cruz	0–2	Sete de Setembro	Recife
(UTC-3)		Report	Diogo Capela 18' (pen.); Grafite 90+5'	Stadium: Estádio José do Rego Maciel (Arruda); Referee: Anderson Luis Marques

28 April 2021 4*	Retrô	2–3	Santa Cruz	São Lourenço da Mata
(UTC-3)	Kauê 33'; Neilson 38'	Report	Elicarlos 28'; Eduardo Soares 42'; Chiquinho 58'	Stadium: Estádio Governador Carlos Wilson Campos (Arena Pernambuco); Referee: Bruno Arleu de Araujo

2 May 2021 9	Afogados da Ingazeira	0–0	Santa Cruz	Afogados da Ingazeira
(UTC-3)				Stadium: Estádio Valdemar Viana de Araújo

==== Quarter-final ====
5 May 2021	Santa Cruz	0–0 (5–4 p)	Afogados da Ingazeira	Recife
(UTC-3)		Report		Stadium: Estádio José do Rego Maciel (Arruda); Referee: Michelangelo Almeida
	Penalties
	Penalty scored		Penalty scored

==== Semi-final ====
9 May 2021	Náutico	2–1	Santa Cruz	São Lourenço da Mata
16:00 (UTC-3)	Kieza 19', 53' (pen.)	Report	Guillermo Paiva 89' (o.g.)	Stadium: Estádio Governador Carlos Wilson Campos (Arena Pernambuco); Referee: Rafael Traci

==== Record ====
Final Position	Points	Matches	Wins	Draws	Losses	Goals For	Goals Away	Avg%
4th	14	11	3	5	3	13	11	42%

=== Copa do Brasil ===
==== First round ====
26 March 2021	Ypiranga	0–4	Santa Cruz	Mesquita
15:30 (UTC-3)		Report	Pipico 32', 69'; Alan Cardoso 43'; Chiquinho 75'	Stadium: Estádio Giulite Coutinho; Attendance: 0 Referee: Jefferson Ferreira de Moraes

==== Second round ====
13 April 2021	Cianorte	1–0	Santa Cruz	Cianorte
19:00 (UTC-3)	Maurício 65'	Report		Stadium: Estádio Municipal Olímpico Albino Turbay; Attendance: 0 Referee: Dewson Fernando Freitas da Silva

==== Record ====
Final Position	Points	Matches	Wins	Draws	Losses	Goals For	Goals Away	Avg%
40th	3	2	1	0	1	4	1	50%

=== Série C ===
30 May 2021 1	Manaus	2–0	Santa Cruz	Manaus
18:00 (UTC-4)	Vanilson 26', 62'	Report		Stadium: Arena da Amazônia; Attendance: 0 Referee: Marcos Mateus Pereira

5 June 2021 2	Santa Cruz	0–0	Floresta	Recife
17:00 (UTC-3)		Report		Stadium: Estádio José do Rego Maciel (Arruda); Attendance: 140; Referee: Leonilson Fernandes Trigueiro Filho

14 June 2021 3	Ferroviário	1–0	Santa Cruz	Fortaleza
20:00 (UTC-3)	Vitão 46'	Report		Stadium: Estádio Governador Plácido Castelo (Castelão); Attendance: 0 Referee: Francisco Carlos do Nascimento

21 June 2021 4	Santa Cruz	2–2	Jacuipense	Recife
20:00 (UTC-3)	Lucas Batatinha 51'; Léo Gaúcho 88'	Report	Bambam 54'; Thiaguinho 67'	Stadium: Estádio José do Rego Maciel (Arruda); Attendance: 160; Referee: Leonardo Ferreira Lima

26 June 2021 5	Volta Redonda	0–0	Santa Cruz	Volta Redonda
19:00 (UTC-3)		Report		Stadium: Estádio Municipal General Sylvio (Raulino de Oliveira); Attendance: 0 Referee: Maguielson Lima Barbosa

3 July 2021 6	Santa Cruz	1–2	Paysandu	Recife
19:00 (UTC-3)	Pipico 90+1'	Report	Nicolas 20'; Ratinho 78'	Stadium: Estádio José do Rego Maciel (Arruda); Attendance: 166; Referee: Ilbert Estevam da Silva

10 July 2021 7	Altos	1–0	Santa Cruz	Teresina
(UTC-3)	Lucas 90+8'	Report		Stadium: Estádio Governador Alberto Tavares Silva (Albertão); Attendance: 0 Referee: Eduardo Tomaz de Aquino Valadão

17 July 2021 8	Santa Cruz	0–1	Tombense	Recife
17:00 (UTC-3)		Report	Rubens 23'	Stadium: Estádio José do Rego Maciel (Arruda); Attendance: 165; Referee: José Henrique de Azevedo Junior

24 July 2021 9	Botafogo–PB	1–0	Santa Cruz	João Pessoa
19:00 (UTC-3)	Sávio 55'	Report		Stadium: Estádio José Américo de Almeida Filho (Almeidão); Attendance: 0 Referee: Fábio Augusto Santos Sá Junior

1 August 2021 10	Santa Cruz	1–2	Manaus	Recife
18:00 (UTC-3)	Pipico 90+1'	Report	Denilson 9'; Rafhael Lucas 53'	Stadium: Estádio José do Rego Maciel (Arruda); Attendance: 167; Referee: Leonardo Sígari Zanon

7 August 2021 11	Floresta	0–2	Santa Cruz	Caucaia
17:00 (UTC-3)		Report	Pipico 43'; Rafael Castro 85'	Stadium: Estádio Raimundo de Oliveira Filho; Attendance: 0 Referee: Rafael Martins Diniz

15 August 2021 12	Santa Cruz	0–0	Ferroviário–CE	Recife
18:00 (UTC-3)		Report		Stadium: Estádio José do Rego Maciel (Arruda); Attendance: 185; Referee: Thayslane de Melo Costa

23 August 2021 13	Jacuipense	1–1	Santa Cruz	Salvador
20:00 (UTC-3)	Daniel Peixoto 63'	Report	Pipico 34'	Stadium: Estádio Manoel Barradas (Barradão); Attendance: 0 Referee: Rodrigo Batista Raposo

30 August 2021 14	Santa Cruz	2–1	Volta Redonda	Recife
20:00 (UTC-3)	Pipico 11'; Breno Calixto 80'	Report	Pedrinho 72'	Stadium: Estádio José do Rego Maciel (Arruda); Attendance: 155; Referee: Paulo Henrique Schleich Vollkopf

5 September 2021 15	Paysandu	1–0	Santa Cruz	Belém
18:00 (UTC-3)	Marino 58'	Report		Stadium: Estádio Leônidas Sodré de Castro (Curuzu); Attendance: 0 Referee: Douglas Marques das Flores

11 September 2021 16	Santa Cruz	0–1	Altos	Recife
17:00 (UTC-3)		Report	Tiaguinho 51'	Stadium: Estádio José do Rego Maciel (Arruda); Attendance: 141; Referee: Rafael Carlos Salgueiro Lima

19 September 2021 17	Tombense	2–1	Santa Cruz	Tombos
18:00 (UTC-3)	Moisés Evangelista 38'; Rubens 69'	Report	Pipico 33'	Stadium: Estádio Antônio Guimarães de Almeida (Almeidão); Attendance: 0 Referee: Paulo Henrique de Melo Salmazio

25 September 2021 18	Santa Cruz	1–1	Botafogo–PB	São Lourenço da Mata
17:00 (UTC-3)	Eduardo Soares 60'	Report	Cleyton 44'	Stadium: Estádio Governador Carlos Wilson Campos (Arena Pernambuco); Attendance: 186; Referee: Rodrigo Batista Raposo

==== Record ====
Final Position	Points	Matches	Wins	Draws	Losses	Goals For	Goals Away	Avg%
19th	12	18	2	6	10	11	19	22%
