= 2020 Clube Náutico Capibaribe season =

Náutico
2020 season
- Chairman: Edno Melo
- Manager: Gilmar Dal Pozzo; Gilson Kleina; Hélio dos Anjos
- Stadium: Estádio dos Aflitos
- Série B: 16th
- Pernambucano: Semi-final
- Copa do Nordeste: Group stage
- Copa do Brasil: Second round
- Top goalscorer: League: Kieza (8); All: Jean Carlos (13)
Home colours	Away colours	Third colours

The 2020 season was Náutico's 120th season in the club's history. Náutico competed in the Campeonato Pernambucano, Copa do Nordeste, Copa do Brasil and Série B.

== Squad ==
Note: Flags indicate national team as defined under FIFA eligibility rules; some limited exceptions apply. Players may hold more than one non-FIFA nationality.

No.	Pos.	Nation	Player
1	GK	BRA	Jefferson
2	DF	BRA	Hereda
3	DF	BRA	Ronaldo Alves
4	DF	BRA	Diego Silva
6	DF	BRA	Willian Simões
7	FW	BRA	Álvaro
8	MF	BOL	Antonio Bustamante
9	FW	BRA	Kieza
10	MF	BRA	Jean Carlos
11	FW	BRA	Matheus Carvalho
17	MF	BRA	Wagninho
18	MF	BRA	Jhonnatan
19	FW	PAR	Guillermo Paiva
20	MF	BRA	Lucas Paraíba
21	MF	PAR	Júnior Brítez
22	DF	BRA	Williams Bahia
23	FW	BRA	Jorge Henrique
29	MF	BRA	Djavan
30	DF	BRA	Rafael Ribeiro

No.	Pos.	Nation	Player
31	DF	BRA	Bryan
32	GK	BRA	Renan
33	FW	BRA	Erick
34	DF	BRA	Rafael Dumas
39	MF	BRA	Matheus Trindade
44	DF	BRA	Camutanga
48	DF	BRA	Carlão
50	DF	BRA	Yago Rocha
54	GK	BRA	Halls
62	DF	BRA	Kevyn Lucas
67	FW	BRA	Dudu
70	FW	BRA	Vinícius
80	MF	BRA	Wanderson
89	MF	BRA	Ruy
94	MF	BRA	Marcos Vinícius
97	MF	BRA	Dadá Belmonte
98	MF	BRA	Rhaldney
—	GK	BRA	Anderson
—	MF	BRA	Renan Foguinho

== Statistics ==
=== Overall ===
Games played	59 (11 Pernambucano, 8 Copa do Nordeste, 2 Copa do Brasil, 38 Série B)
Games won	19 (5 Pernambucano, 3 Copa do Nordeste, 1 Copa do Brasil, 10 Série B)
Games drawn	21 (4 Pernambucano, 2 Copa do Nordeste, 1 Copa do Brasil, 14 Série B)
Games lost	19 (2 Pernambucano, 3 Copa do Nordeste, 0 Copa do Brasil, 14 Série B)
Goals scored	65
Goals conceded	66
Goal difference	–1
Best results (goal difference)	4–0 (H) v Decisão - Pernambucano - 2020.01.29
Worst result (goal difference)	1–4 (A) v Bahia - Copa do Nordeste - 2020.07.22
Top scorer	Jean Carlos (13)

Source: Náutico official website

=== Goalscorers ===
Place	Position	Nationality	Number	Name	Campeonato Pernambucano	Copa do Nordeste	Copa do Brasil	Série B	Other	Total
1	MF	(Brazil)	10	Jean Carlos	1	3	2	7	0	13
2	FW	(Brazil)	9	Kieza	2	1	0	8	0	11
3	FW	(Brazil)	33	Erick	1	0	0	6	0	7
4	FW	(Paraguay)	19	Guillermo Paiva	0	1	0	3	0	4
4	FW	(Brazil)	11	Matheus Carvalho	2	1	1	0	0	4
5	FW	(Brazil)	92	Salatiel	2	0	0	0	1	3
5	DF	(Brazil)	30	Rafael Ribeiro	2	0	0	1	0	3
6	DF	(Brazil)	44	Camutanga	0	0	0	2	0	2
6	MF	(Brazil)	97	Dadá Belmonte	0	0	0	2	0	2
6	MF	(Brazil)	23	Jorge Henrique	1	1	0	0	0	2
7	FW	(Brazil)	7	Álvaro Oliveira	0	0	0	1	0	1
7	DF	(Brazil)	31	Bryan	0	0	0	1	0	1
7	DF	(Brazil)	66	Erick Daltro	1	0	0	0	0	1
7	DF	(Brazil)	25	Fernando	0	1	0	0	0	1
7	DF	(Brazil)	2	Hereda	0	0	0	1	0	1
7	FW	(Brazil)	71	Juninho Carpina	1	0	0	0	0	1
7	MF	(Brazil)	43	Luanderson	0	1	0	0	0	1
7	MF	(Brazil)	98	Rhaldney	0	0	0	1	0	1
7	DF	(Brazil)	3	Ronaldo Alves	0	1	0	0	0	1
7	MF	(Brazil)	89	Ruy	0	0	0	1	0	1
7	FW	(Brazil)	77	Thiago Fernandes	1	0	0	0	0	1
7	FW	(Brazil)	70	Vinícius	0	0	0	1	0	1
				Own goals	1	1	0	0	0	2
				Total	15	11	3	35	1	65

=== Managers performance ===
Name	Nationality	From	To	P	W	D	L	GF	GA	Avg%	Ref
Gilmar Dal Pozzo	Brazil	8 January 2020	11 August 2020	24	9	9	6	30	27	50%	
Dudu Capixaba (c)	Brazil	10 February 2020	19 August 2020	3	0	3	0	2	2	33%	
Gilson Kleina	Brazil	22 August 2020	17 November 2020	17	4	5	8	18	25	33%	
Hélio dos Anjos	Brazil	21 November 2020	29 January 2021	17	6	6	5	16	15	47%	

(c) Indicates the caretaker manager

== Friendlies ==
8 January 2020	Treze	0–0	Náutico	Campina Grande
(UTC-3)		Report		Stadium: Estádio Governador Ernani Sátyro (Amigão); Referee: Tiago Ramos de Oliveira

12 January 2020	Náutico	1–1	Treze	Recife
(UTC-3)	Salatiel 16'	Report	Caxito 83'	Stadium: Estádio Eládio de Barros Carvalho (Aflitos); Referee: José Woshington

== Official Competitions ==
=== Campeonato Pernambucano ===
==== First stage ====
19 January 2020 1	Náutico	1–1	Sport	Recife
16:00 (UTC-3)	Chico 62' (o.g.)	Report	Salatiel 45' (o.g.)	Stadium: Estádio Eládio de Barros Carvalho (Aflitos); Attendance: 7,270; Referee: Michelangelo Almeida Júnior

26 January 2020 2	Petrolina	0–1	Náutico	Petrolina
16:00 (UTC-3)		Report	Erick 88'	Stadium: Estádio Paulo de Souza Coelho; Referee: Nairon Pereira de Lira

29 January 2020 3	Náutico	4–0	Decisão	Recife
21:30 (UTC-3)	Kieza 9', 36'; Jean Carlos 51'; Matheus Carvalho 56'	Report		Stadium: Estádio Eládio de Barros Carvalho (Aflitos); Attendance: 4,802; Referee: Deborah Cecilia Cruz Correia

5 February 2020 4	Vitória das Tabocas	1–2	Náutico	São Lourenço da Mata
20:30 (UTC-3)	Fabinho Vitória 3'	Report	Matheus Carvalho 12'; Salatiel 34'	Stadium: Estádio Governador Carlos Wilson Campos (Arena Pernambuco); Referee: Anderson Luis Marques

10 February 2020 5	Náutico	1–1	Afogados da Ingazeira	Recife
20:00 (UTC-3)	Juninho Carpina 50'	Report	Candinho 55'	Stadium: Estádio Eládio de Barros Carvalho (Aflitos); Attendance: 2,351; Referee: Gilberto Rodrigues Castro Junior

21 February 2020 6	Náutico	0–1	Central	Recife
19:15 (UTC-3)		Report	Bambam 14'	Stadium: Estádio Eládio de Barros Carvalho (Aflitos); Referee: Diego Fernando Silva de Lima

1 March 2020 7	Santa Cruz	2–0	Náutico	Recife
16:00 (UTC-3)	Victor Rangel 69'; William Alves 84'	Report		Stadium: Estádio José do Rego Maciel (Arruda); Attendance: 8,155; Referee: Rodrigo Jose Pereira de Lima

8 March 2020 8	Náutico	2–2	Retrô	Recife
16:00 (UTC-3)	Salatiel 41'; Erick Daltro 46'	Report	Fabiano Santos 15'; Marlon 60'	Stadium: Estádio Eládio de Barros Carvalho (Aflitos); Referee: Tiago Nascimento dos Santos

19 July 2020 9	Salgueiro	1–2	Náutico	Salgueiro
16:00 (UTC-3)	Ciel 21'	Report	Thiago Fernandes 11'; Jorge Henrique 76'	Stadium: Estádio Cornélio de Barros; Attendance: 0 Referee: Tiago Nascimento dos Santos

==== Quarter-final ====
26 July 2020	Náutico	2–1	Central	São Lourenço da Mata
16:00 (UTC-3)	Rafael Ribeiro 31', 59'	Report	Gustavo Henrique 53'	Stadium: Estádio Governador Carlos Wilson Campos (Arena Pernambuco); Attendance: 0 Referee: Diego Fernando Silva de Lima

==== Semi-final ====
29 July 2020	Santa Cruz	0–0 (7–6 p)	Náutico	São Lourenço da Mata
21:30 (UTC-3)		Report		Stadium: Estádio Governador Carlos Wilson Campos (Arena Pernambuco); Attendance: 0 Referee: Rodrigo José Pereira de Lima
	Penalties
	Pipico (penalty scored); Danny Morais (penalty scored); Toty (penalty scored); Fabiano (penalty missed); André (penalty scored); João Cardoso (penalty scored); Célio Santos (penalty scored); Tinga (penalty scored)		(penalty scored) Jean Carlos; (penalty missed) Thiago Fernandes; (penalty scored) Erick Daltro; (penalty scored) Wagninho; (penalty scored) Kieza; (penalty scored) Erick; (penalty scored) Rafael Ribeiro; (penalty missed) Djavan

==== Record ====
Final Position	Points	Matches	Wins	Draws	Losses	Goals For	Goals Away	Avg%
3rd	19	11	5	4	2	15	10	57%

=== Copa do Nordeste ===
23 January 2020 1	Náutico	1–1	River	Recife
19:30 (UTC-3)	Matheus Carvalho 38'	Report	Eduardo dos Santos 2'	Stadium: Estádio Eládio de Barros Carvalho (Aflitos); Attendance: 6,248; Referee: Rafael Carlos Salgueiro Lima

1 February 2020 2	Freipaulistano	0–2	Náutico	Itabaiana
20:00 (UTC-3)		Report	Paiva 60'; Fernando 77'	Stadium: Estádio Etelvino Mendonça; Attendance: 543; Referee: José Ricardo Vasconcellos Laranjeira

8 February 2020 3	Botafogo–PB	2–1	Náutico	João Pessoa
16:00 (UTC-3)	Luis Gustavo 20'; Rodrigo Andrade 53'	Report	Jean Carlos 55'	Stadium: Estádio José Américo de Almeida Filho (Almeidão); Attendance: 5,449; Referee: Denis da Silva Ribeiro Serafim

15 February 2020 4	Náutico	2–0	Sport	Recife
18:00 (UTC-3)	Ronaldo Alves 8'; Jean Carlos 76'	Report		Stadium: Estádio Eládio de Barros Carvalho (Aflitos); Attendance: 5,363; Referee: Wagner Reway

27 February 2020 5	Náutico	1–1	ABC	Recife
20:00 (UTC-3)	Bruno Souza 10' (o.g.)	Report	Jailson 3'	Stadium: Estádio Eládio de Barros Carvalho (Aflitos); Attendance: 4,276; Referee: Michael Vinicius Santos Freitas

4 March 2020 6	CRB	2–3	Náutico	Maceió
19:30 (UTC-3)	Luidy Viegas 21'; Rafael Longuine 68'	Report	Luanderson 19'; Jorge Henrique 75'; Jean Carlos 90+2'	Stadium: Estádio Rei Pelé; Attendance: 4,994; Referee: Leo Simão Holanda

14 March 2020 7	Náutico	0–3	Fortaleza	Recife
18:00 (UTC-3)		Report	David 32'; Yuri César 67'; Bruno Melo 70'	Stadium: Estádio Eládio de Barros Carvalho (Aflitos); Attendance: 4,415; Referee: Mayron Frederico dos Reis Novais

22 July 2020 8	Bahia	4–1	Náutico	Salvador
20:00 (UTC-3)	Élber 3'; Rodriguinho 26'; Fernandão 58'; Nino Paraíba 76'	Report	Kieza 46'	Stadium: Estádio Governador Roberto Santos (Pituaçu); Attendance: 0 Referee: Denis da Silva Ribeiro Serafim

==== Record ====
Final Position	Points	Matches	Wins	Draws	Losses	Goals For	Goals Away	Avg%
9th	11	8	3	2	3	11	13	46%

=== Copa do Brasil ===
==== First round ====
12 February 2020	Toledo	0–2	Náutico	Toledo
21:30 (UTC-3)		Report	Jean Carlos 59'; Matheus Carvalho 69'	Stadium: Estádio Municipal 14 de Dezembro; Attendance: 2,361; Referee: Rodrigo da Fonseca Silva

==== Second round ====
19 February 2020	Náutico	1–1 (3–4 p)	Botafogo	Recife
21:30 (UTC-3)	Jean Carlos 43'	Report	Bruno Nazário 68'	Stadium: Estádio Eládio de Barros Carvalho (Aflitos); Attendance: 10,717; Referee: André Luiz de Freitas Castro
	Penalties
	Jean Carlos (penalty scored); Ronaldo Alves (penalty missed); Jhonnatan (penalty scored); Josa (penalty scored); Guillermo Paiva (penalty missed)		(penalty scored) Pedro Raul; (penalty scored) Alex Santana; (penalty missed) Luiz Fernando; (penalty scored) Bruno Nazário; (penalty scored) Danilo Barcelos

==== Record ====
Final Position	Points	Matches	Wins	Draws	Losses	Goals For	Goals Away	Avg%
32nd	4	2	1	1	0	3	1	66%

=== Série B ===
==== Table ====
Pos	Team	Pld	W	D	L	GF	GA	GD	Pts	Promotion or relegation
14	Vitória	38	11	15	12	45	45	0	48	
15	Confiança	38	12	10	16	38	46	−8	46	
16	Náutico	38	10	14	14	35	42	−7	44	
17	Figueirense (R)	38	9	12	17	35	49	−14	39	Relegation to 2021 Campeonato Brasileiro Série C
18	Paraná (R)	38	9	10	19	34	50	−16	37	Relegation to 2021 Campeonato Brasileiro Série C

Source: CBF
Rules for classification: 1) points; 2) wins; 3) goal difference; 4) goals scored; 5) head-to-head results (only between 2 teams); 6) fewest red cards; 7) fewest yellow cards; 8) draw.
(R) Relegated

==== Matches ====
8 August 2020 1	Avaí	3–1	Náutico	Florianópolis
19:00 (UTC-3)	Rodríguez 24', 90+3'; Carlão 39' (o.g.)	Report	Kieza 67'	Stadium: Estádio Aderbal Ramos da Silva (Ressacada); Attendance: 0 Referee: Alexandre Vargas Tavares de Jesus

11 August 2020 2	Náutico	0–0	Operário	Recife
21:30 (UTC-3)		Report		Stadium: Estádio Eládio de Barros Carvalho (Aflitos); Attendance: 145; Referee: Vinicius Gonçalves Dias Araujo

15 August 2020 3	Náutico	1–1	CRB	Recife
19:00 (UTC-3)	Camutanga 23'	Report	Léo Gamalho 88'	Stadium: Estádio Eládio de Barros Carvalho (Aflitos); Attendance: 130; Referee: Douglas Marques das Flores

19 August 2020 4	Vitória	0–0	Náutico	Salvador
21:30 (UTC-3)		Report		Stadium: Estádio Manoel Barradas (Barradão); Attendance: 0 Referee: Heber Roberto Lopes

22 August 2020 5	Náutico	3–3	Juventude	Recife
16:30 (UTC-3)	Erick 10'; Jean Carlos 14', 72'	Report	Rafael Silva 16'; Dalberto 41', 50'	Stadium: Estádio Eládio de Barros Carvalho (Aflitos); Attendance: 142; Referee: Rodrigo Batista Raposo

28 August 2020 6	Guarani	1–2	Náutico	Campinas
21:30 (UTC-3)	Eduardo Person 45'	Report	Jean Carlos 78'; Paiva 90+2'	Stadium: Estádio Brinco de Ouro da Princesa; Attendance: 0 Referee: Ramon Abatti Abel

1 September 2020 7	Náutico	1–0	Figueirense	Recife
21:30 (UTC-3)	Dadá Belmonte 76'	Report		Stadium: Estádio Eládio de Barros Carvalho (Aflitos); Attendance: 138; Referee: Antonio Dib Moraes de Sousa

5 September 2020 8	Brasil de Pelotas	2–1	Náutico	Pelotas
21:00 (UTC-3)	Sousa 15'; Gabriel Poveda 50'	Report	Dadá Belmonte 47'	Stadium: Estádio Bento Mendes de Freitas; Attendance: 0 Referee: Pathrice Wallace Corrêa Maia

12 September 2020 9	Náutico	3–1	Botafogo–SP	Recife
19:00 (UTC-3)	Erick 21'; Jean Carlos 34'; Rhaldney 45+3'	Report	Wellington 88'	Stadium: Estádio Eládio de Barros Carvalho (Aflitos); Attendance: 125; Referee: Marco Aurelio Augusto Fazekas Ferreira

18 September 2020 10	Náutico	1–1	Chapecoense	Recife
21:30 (UTC-3)	Kieza 77'	Report	Gabriel Busanello 90+4'	Stadium: Estádio Eládio de Barros Carvalho (Aflitos); Attendance: 149; Referee: Adriano Barros Carneiro

29 September 2020 12	Cuiabá	1–0	Náutico	Cuiabá
22:30 (UTC-3)	Jenison 50'	Report		Stadium: Arena Pantanal; Attendance: 0 Referee: Charly Wendy Straub Deretti

3 October 2020 13	Náutico	0–1	Confiança	Recife
16:00 (UTC-3)		Report	Reis 15'	Stadium: Estádio Eládio de Barros Carvalho (Aflitos); Attendance: 125; Referee: Paulo Henrique de Melo Salmazio

6 October 2020 14	Paraná	0–0	Náutico	Curitiba
19:15 (UTC-3)		Report		Stadium: Estádio Durival Britto e Silva (Vila Capanema); Attendance: 0 Referee: Léo Simão Holanda

9 October 2020 15	América–MG	2–0	Náutico	Belo Horizonte
19:15 (UTC-3)	Felipe Azevedo 27', 79'	Report		Stadium: Estádio Raimundo Sampaio (Independência); Attendance: 0 Referee: Wagner Reway

12 October 2020 16	Náutico	0–2	Ponte Preta	Recife
20:00 (UTC-3)		Report	João Paulo 52'; Dawhan 67'	Stadium: Estádio Eládio de Barros Carvalho (Aflitos); Attendance: 170; Referee: Wanderson Alves de Sousa

20 October 2020 17	Oeste	0–1	Náutico	Barueri
19:15 (UTC-3)		Report	Kieza 65'	Stadium: Arena Barueri; Attendance: 0 Referee: Douglas Schwengber da Silva

25 October 2020 18	Náutico	1–1	Cruzeiro	Recife
16:00 (UTC-3)	Vinícius 20'	Report	Airton 85'	Stadium: Estádio Eládio de Barros Carvalho (Aflitos); Attendance: 165; Referee: Leandro Bizzio Marinho

31 October 2020 19	CSA	3–1	Náutico	Maceió
21:00 (UTC-3)	Rafael Bilú 30'; Yago 45+2'; Rafinha 52'	Report	Erick 7'	Stadium: Estádio Rei Pelé; Attendance: 0 Referee: José Mendonça da Silva Junior

6 November 2020 20	Náutico	2–2	Avaí	Recife
19:15 (UTC-3)	Kieza 54'; Paiva 85'	Report	Jonathan 18'; Alan Costa 90+2'	Stadium: Estádio Eládio de Barros Carvalho (Aflitos); Attendance: 180; Referee: Leonardo Ferreira Lima

13 November 2020 21	Operário	3–1	Náutico	Ponta Grossa
16:30 (UTC-3)	Ricardo Bueno 44'; Douglas Coutinho 66', 88'	Report	Kieza 76'	Stadium: Estádio Germano Krüger; Attendance: 0 Referee: Grazianni Maciel Rocha

17 November 2020 11*	Sampaio Corrêa	2–1	Náutico	São Luís
18:00 (UTC-3)	Roney 48'; Caio Dantas 90+7'	Report	Ruy 78'	Stadium: Estádio Governador João Castelo (Castelão); Attendance: 0 Referee: Jonathan Antero Silva

21 November 2020 22	CRB	2–1	Náutico	Maceió
19:00 (UTC-3)	Pablo Dyego 45+2'; Luidy 62'	Report	Álvaro Oliveira 86'	Stadium: Estádio Rei Pelé; Attendance: 0 Referee: Antonio Dib Moraes de Sousa

25 November 2020 23	Náutico	0–0	Vitória	Recife
19:00 (UTC-3)		Report		Stadium: Estádio Eládio de Barros Carvalho (Aflitos); Attendance: 172; Referee: Emerson de Almeida Ferreira

28 November 2020 24	Juventude	1–0	Náutico	Caxias do Sul
21:00 (UTC-3)	Capixaba 46'	Report		Stadium: Estádio Alfredo Jaconi; Attendance: 0 Referee: André Rodrigo Rocha

1 December 2020 25	Náutico	2–0	Guarani	Recife
19:15 (UTC-3)	Bryan 18'; Kieza 68'	Report		Stadium: Estádio Eládio de Barros Carvalho (Aflitos); Attendance: 175; Referee: Francisco Carlos do Nascimento

6 December 2020 26	Figueirense	2–0	Náutico	Florianópolis
18:15 (UTC-3)	Bruno Michel 47'; Jhonatan 90+2'	Report		Stadium: Estádio Orlando Scarpelli; Attendance: 39; Referee: Vinicius Gomes do Amaral

10 December 2020 27	Náutico	1–0	Brasil de Pelotas	Recife
21:30 (UTC-3)	Jean Carlos 20'	Report		Stadium: Estádio Eládio de Barros Carvalho (Aflitos); Attendance: 164; Referee: Leonardo Sígari Zanon

13 December 2020 28	Botafogo–SP	1–1	Náutico	Ribeirao Preto
18:15 (UTC-3)	Matheus Anjos 45'	Report	Paiva 78'	Stadium: Estádio Santa Cruz; Attendance: 0 Referee: Rodrigo Batista Raposo

16 December 2020 29	Chapecoense	0–0	Náutico	Chapecó
19:15 (UTC-3)		Report		Stadium: Arena Condá; Attendance: 46; Referee: Daniel Nobre Bins

19 December 2020 30	Náutico	1–0	Sampaio Corrêa	Recife
16:30 (UTC-3)	Camutanga 67'	Report		Stadium: Estádio Eládio de Barros Carvalho (Aflitos); Attendance: 140; Referee: Rodrigo Carvalhaes de Miranda

22 December 2020 31	Náutico	2–0	Cuiabá	Recife
21:30 (UTC-3)	Rafael Ribeiro 58'; Jean Carlos 85'	Report		Stadium: Estádio Eládio de Barros Carvalho (Aflitos); Attendance: 202; Referee: Jefferson Ferreira de Moraes

4 January 2021 32	Confiança	2–0	Náutico	Aracaju
20:00 (UTC-3)	Reis 56'; Madison 90+8'	Report		Stadium: Estádio Lourival Baptista (Batistão); Attendance: 0 Referee: Dewson Fernando Freitas da Silva

8 January 2021 33	Náutico	2–1	Paraná	Recife
19:15 (UTC-3)	Kieza 37'; Erick 63'	Report	Hurtado 16'	Stadium: Estádio Eládio de Barros Carvalho (Aflitos); Attendance: 184; Referee: Alisson Sidnei Furtado

12 January 2021 34	Náutico	0–0	América–MG	Recife
19:15 (UTC-3)		Report		Stadium: Estádio Eládio de Barros Carvalho (Aflitos); Attendance: 193; Referee: Douglas Schwengber da Silva

17 January 2021 35	Ponte Preta	2–0	Náutico	Campinas
16:00 (UTC-3)	Camilo 5', 12'	Report		Stadium: Estádio Moisés Lucarelli; Attendance: 0 Referee: Paulo Cesar Zanovelli

20 January 2021 36	Náutico	4–1	Oeste	Recife
19:15 (UTC-3)	Hereda 4'; Jean Carlos 20'; Kieza 30'; Erick 53'	Report	Pedrinho 62'	Stadium: Estádio Eládio de Barros Carvalho (Aflitos); Attendance: 134; Referee: Alexandre Vargas Tavares de Jesus

24 January 2021 37	Cruzeiro	0–0	Náutico	Belo Horizonte
16:00 (UTC-3)		Report		Stadium: Estádio Raimundo Sampaio (Independência); Attendance: 0 Referee: Flávio Rodrigues de Souza

29 January 2021 38	Náutico	1–1	CSA	Recife
21:30 (UTC-3)	Erick 38'	Report	Pedro Lucas 58'	Stadium: Estádio Eládio de Barros Carvalho (Aflitos); Attendance: 232; Referee: Wagner do Nascimento Magalhães

(*) Postponed matches due to changes in competition schedules

==== Record ====
Final Position	Points	Matches	Wins	Draws	Losses	Goals For	Goals Away	Avg%
16th	44	38	10	14	14	35	42	38%
