= 2020 Campeonato Pernambucano =

Campeonato Pernambucano
- Season: 2020
- Champions: Salgueiro (1st title)
- Relegated: Decisão; Petrolina
- 2021 Copa do Brasil: Retrô; Salgueiro; Santa Cruz
- 2021 Copa do Nordeste: Salgueiro; Sport (via RNC)
- 2021 Pré-Copa do Nordeste: Santa Cruz (via RNC)
- 2021 Série D: Central; Retrô
- Matches played: 57
- Goals scored: 134 (2.35 per match)
- Top goalscorer: Pipico (6 goals)
- Total attendance: 104,730 (2,685 per match)

The 2020 Campeonato Pernambucano da Série A1 (officially the Campeonato Pernambucano estadium.bet 2020 for sponsorship reasons) was the 106th edition of the state championship of Pernambuco organized by FPF. The championship began on 18 January and ended on 5 August.

On 14 March 2020, FPF announced that all the matches of Campeonato Pernambucano would be played behind closed doors to prevent the spread of the coronavirus COVID-19. Consequently, the match Santa Cruz v Decisão played on 15 March 2020 was played behind closed doors. On 16 March 2020, FPF announced the suspension of the tournament. Complying with the guidelines of the Governo do Estado de Pernambuco, the tournament resumed behind closed doors on 19 July 2020.

Sport were the defending champions, but were eliminated in the first stage.

The finals were contested in two-legged home-and-away format between Salgueiro and Santa Cruz. Tied 1–1 on aggregate, Salgueiro won 4–3 on penalties, winning the tournament for the first time in their history. As champions, Salgueiro qualified for the 2021 Copa do Brasil and 2021 Copa do Nordeste.

Santa Cruz and Retrô qualified for 2021 Copa do Brasil as runners-up and best placed team in the first stage not already qualified, respectively.

Sport (best team in the 2020 RNC) qualified for the 2021 Copa do Nordeste. Santa Cruz qualified for the 2021 Pré-Copa do Nordeste via RNC.

== Teams ==
Ten teams were competing, eight returning from the 2019 and two promoted from the 2019 Pernambucano A2 Championship: Decisão and Retrô.

Club	City	Stadium	Coordinates	Capacity
Afogados	Afogados da Ingazeira	Valdemar Viana de Araújo	7.7585°S 37.6334°W	1,735
Central	Caruaru	Lacerdão	8.2786°S 35.9752°W	19,478
Decisão	Bonito	Lacerdão (Caruaru)^{[a]}	8.2786°S 35.9752°W	19,478
Decisão	Bonito	Antônio Inácio de Souza (Caruaru)^{[b]}	8.2900°S 35.9831°W	6,000
Náutico	Recife	Aflitos	8.0406°S 34.8990°W	22,856
Petrolina	Petrolina	Paulo de Souza Coelho	9.3911°S 40.5034°W	5,000
Retrô	Camaragibe	Arena Pernambuco (São Lourenço da Mata)^{[c]}	8.0406°S 35.0104°W	44,300
Salgueiro	Salgueiro	Cornélio de Barros	8.0761°S 39.1194°W	12,070
Santa Cruz	Recife	Arruda	8.0267°S 34.8933°W	60,044
Sport	Recife	Ilha do Retiro^{[d]}	8.0629°S 34.9051°W	32,983
Vitória das Tabocas	Vitória de Santo Antão	Arena Pernambuco (São Lourenço da Mata)^{[e]}	8.0406°S 35.0104°W	44,300

^{a} Decisão originally played their home matches at Lacerdão instead of their regular stadium Arthur Tavares de Melo, Bonito. However, they played their home match against Retrô (Feb. 20) at Arena Pernambuco.
^{b} After the suspension of the tournament due to the COVID-19 pandemic, Decisão moved their home matches from Lacerdão to stadium Antônio Inácio de Souza.
^{c} Retrô played their home match against Santa Cruz (Jan. 21) at Aflitos.
^{d} Sport played their home matches against Vitória das Tabocas (Jan. 22) and Central (Jan. 28) at Arena Pernambuco.
^{e} Vitória das Tabocas played their home matches at Arena Pernambuco instead of their regular stadium Severino Cândido Carneiro, Vitória de Santo Antão. However, they played their home matches against Decisão (Jan. 19) and Salgueiro (Mar. 7) at Lacerdão.

Following the COVID protocol proposed by FPF, after the suspension due to the pandemic, all the matches would be played at Arena Pernambuco. However the second semi-final, Salgueiro v Afogados, was player at Cornélio de Barros and the finals between Salgueiro and Santa Cruz were played at Cornélio de Barros and Arruda.

== Schedule ==
The schedule of the competition was as follows.

First Stage
Round 1:	18–19 January	
Round 2:	21–22 and 25–26 January	
Round 3:	28–29 January and 1–2 February	
Round 4:	5–6, 8–9 and 16 February	
Round 5:	4 and 10–12 February	
Round 6:	19–21 and 26 February	
Round 7:	29 February and 1 March	
Round 8:	4, 7–8 and 15 March	
Round 9:	19 July	
Relegation Stage
Round 1:	27 and 29 July	
Round 2:	1 August	
Round 3:	5 August	
Final Stages
Quarter-finals	26 July	
Semi-finals	29 and 30 July	
	First leg	Second leg
Finals	2 August	5 August

== First stage ==
In the first stage, each team played the other nine teams in a single round-robin tournament. The teams were ranked according to points (3 points for a win, 1 point for a draw, and 0 points for a loss). If tied on points, the following criteria would be used to determine the ranking: 1. Wins; 2. Goal difference; 3. Goals scored; 4. Fewest red cards; 5. Fewest yellow cards; 6. Draw in the headquarters of the FPF.

Top two teams advanced to the semi-finals of the final stages, while teams from third to sixth places advanced to the quarter-finals. The four teams with the lowest number of points played a relegation stage.

Best team not qualified for the finals qualified for 2021 Copa do Brasil. Top two teams not already qualified for 2021 Série A, Série B or Série C qualified for 2021 Série D.

=== Standings ===
Pos	Team	Pld	W	D	L	GF	GA	GD	Pts	Qualification
1	Santa Cruz	9	8	1	0	16	4	+12	25	Advance to semi-finals
2	Salgueiro	9	5	1	3	12	9	+3	16	Advance to semi-finals (Note: Salgueiro declined to participate in the 2021 Série D. They were replaced by Central.)
3	Retrô	9	4	3	2	20	10	+10	15	Advance to quarter-finals and qualify for 2021 Série D and 2021 Copa do Brasil
4	Náutico	9	4	3	2	13	9	+4	15	Advance to quarter-finals
5	Central	9	3	4	2	10	6	+4	13	Advance to quarter-finals and qualify for 2021 Série D
6	Afogados	9	3	4	2	13	13	0	13	Advance to quarter-finals
7	Sport	9	2	5	2	10	7	+3	11	Advance to relegation stage
8	Petrolina	9	1	4	4	6	16	−10	7	Advance to relegation stage
9	Decisão	9	1	1	7	6	24	−18	4	Advance to relegation stage
10	Vitória das Tabocas	9	0	2	7	3	11	−8	2	Advance to relegation stage

Source: FPF

=== Results ===
Home \ Away	AFO	CEN	DEC	NAU	PET	RET	SAL	SAN	SPO	VIT
Afogados					2–2	2–2	2–1	0–2		1–0
Central	1–1					0–2		0–0		1–0
Decisão	0–4	0–5				2–5			0–0	
Náutico	1–1	0–1	4–0			2–2			1–1	
Petrolina		1–1	2–1	0–1					0–0	
Retrô					5–0		0–1	1–2		2–0
Salgueiro		1–1	2–1	1–2	2–0				2–1	
Santa Cruz			2–1	2–0	3–0		2–1			1–0
Sport	4–0	1–0				1–1		1–2		1–1
Vitória das Tabocas			0–1	1–2	1–1		0–1			

Source: FPF
Legend: Blue = home team win; Yellow = draw; Red = away team win.

== Relegation stage ==
In the relegation stage each team played the other three teams in a single round-robin tournament. The two teams with the lowest number of points were relegated to the 2021 Campeonato Pernambucano A2. The teams were ranked according to points (3 points for a win, 1 point for a draw, and 0 points for a loss). If tied on points, the following criteria would be used to determine the ranking: 1. Wins; 2. Goal difference; 3. Goals scored; 4. Fewest red cards; 5. Fewest yellow cards; 6. Draw in the headquarters of the FPF.

=== Standings and Results ===
Pos	Team	Pld	W	D	L	GF	GA	GD	Pts	Relegation	SPO	VIT	PET	DEC
1	Sport	3	3	0	0	9	0	+9	9			1–0	5–0	
2	Vitória das Tabocas	3	1	1	1	3	3	0	4					
3	Petrolina (R)	3	0	2	1	2	7	−5	2	Relegation to Pernambucano A2		1–1		1–1
4	Decisão (R)	3	0	1	2	2	6	−4	1	Relegation to Pernambucano A2	0–3	1–2		

Source: FPF
(R) Relegated

== Final stages ==
Starting from the quarter-finals, the teams played a single-elimination tournament with the following rules:

- Quarter-finals and semi-finals were played on a single-leg basis, with the higher-seeded team hosting the leg.
  - If tied, the penalty shoot-out would be used to determine the winner.
- Finals were played on a home-and-away two-legged basis, with the higher-seeded team hosting the second leg.
  - If tied on aggregate, the penalty shoot-out would be used to determine the winner.
- Extra time would not be played and away goals rule would not be used in final stages.
- Third place match was not played.

=== Bracket ===
Quarter-finals
3	Retrô	0
6	Afogados	1
4	Náutico	2
5	Central	1

Semi-finals
2	Salgueiro	3
6	Afogados	0
1	Santa Cruz (p)	0 (7)
4	Náutico	0 (6)

Finals
2	Salgueiro (p)	1	0	1 (4)
1	Santa Cruz	1	0	1 (3)

=== Quarter-finals ===
Team 1	Score	Team 2
Retrô	0–1	Afogados
Náutico	2–1	Central

==== Matches ====
26 July 2020
20:00

Retrô	0–1	Afogados
	Report	Júnior Mandacaru 80'

Arena Pernambuco, São Lourenço da Mata
Attendance: 0
Referee: Michelangelo Martins de Almeida Júnior

26 July 2020
16:00

Náutico	2–1	Central
Rafael Ribeiro 31'; Gustavo Henrique 53' (o.g.)	Report	Rafael Ribeiro 59' (o.g.)

Arena Pernambuco, São Lourenço da Mata
Attendance: 0
Referee: Diego Fernando Silva de Lima

=== Semi-finals ===
Team 1	Score	Team 2
Santa Cruz	0–0 (7–6 p)	Náutico
Salgueiro	3–0	Afogados

==== Matches ====
29 July 2020
21:30

Santa Cruz	0–0	Náutico
	Report
Penalties
Pipico (penalty scored); Danny Morais (penalty scored); Toty (penalty scored); Fabiano (penalty missed); André (penalty scored); João Cardoso (penalty scored); Célio Santos (penalty scored); Tinga (penalty scored)	7–6	(penalty scored) Jean Carlos; (penalty missed) Thiago; (penalty scored) Erick Daltro; (penalty scored) Wagninho; (penalty scored) Kieza; (penalty scored) Erick; (penalty scored) Rafael Ribeiro; (penalty missed) Djavan

Arena Pernambuco, São Lourenço da Mata
Attendance: 0
Referee: Rodrigo José Pereira de Lima

Santa Cruz qualified for the 2021 Copa do Brasil.

30 July 2020
19:00

Salgueiro	3–0	Afogados
Tarcísio 14'; William Daltro 54'; João Paulo 74'	Report

Estádio Cornélio de Barros, Salgueiro
Attendance: 0
Referee: Gilberto Rodrigues Castro Júnior

Salgueiro qualified for the 2021 Copa do Brasil.

=== Finals ===
Team 1	Agg.	Team 2	1st leg	2nd leg
Salgueiro	1–1 (4–3 p)	Santa Cruz	1–1	0–0

==== Matches ====
2 August 2020
16:00

Salgueiro	1–1	Santa Cruz
Renato Henrique 14'	Report	Danny Morais 16'

Estádio Cornélio de Barros, Salgueiro
Attendance: 0
Referee: Rodrigo José Pereira de Lima

5 August 2020
21:30

Santa Cruz	0–0	Salgueiro
	Report
Penalties
Pipico (penalty scored); Danny Morais (penalty scored); Toty (penalty scored); Victor Rangel (penalty missed); André (penalty missed)	3–4	(penalty scored) Ciel; (penalty scored) Alison Araçoiaba; (penalty scored) Dadinha; (penalty missed) Ranieri; (penalty scored) Müller Fernandes

Estádio do Arruda, Recife
Attendance: 0
Referee: Diego Fernando Silva de Lima

Salgueiro qualified for the 2021 Copa do Nordeste.

2020 Campeonato Pernambucano Champions

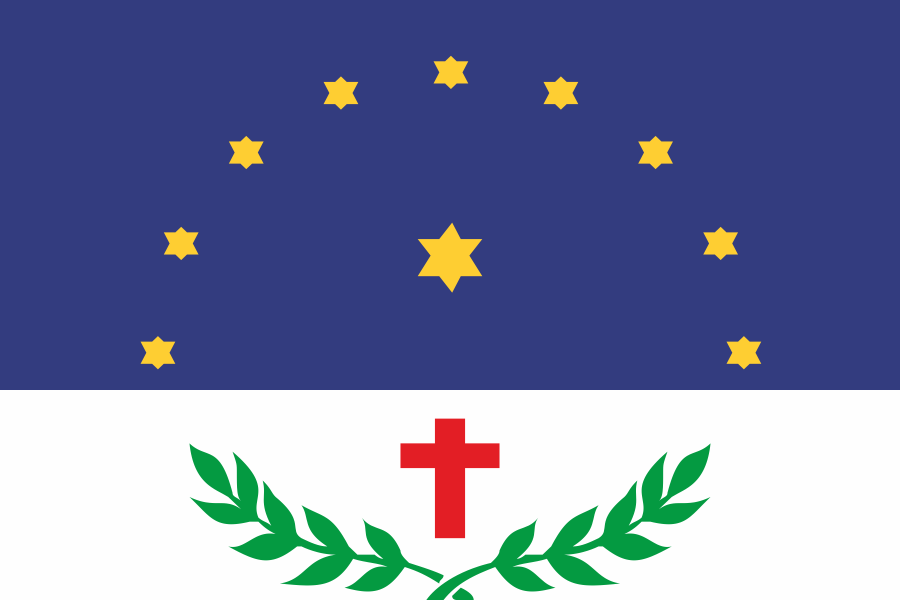

Salgueiro

1st title

== Top goalscorers ==
Rank	Player	Team	Goals
1	Pipico	Santa Cruz	6
2	Diego Ceará	Afogados	5
2	Willian Lira	Retrô	5
4	Hernane	Sport	4
4	Leandro Costa	Central	4
4	Müller Fernandes	Salgueiro	4
7	Bruninho	Petrolina	3
7	Danny Morais	Santa Cruz	3
7	Élton	Sport	3
7	Hériclis	Retrô	3
7	Janderson	Retrô	3
7	Renato Henrique	Salgueiro	3
7	Willian Anicete	Salgueiro	3

Source:FPF

== 2020 Campeonato Pernambucano team ==
The 2020 Campeonato Pernambucano team was a squad consisting of the eleven most impressive players at the tournament.

Pos.	Player	Team
GK	Maycon Cleiton	Santa Cruz
DF	Toty	Santa Cruz
DF	Danny Morais	Santa Cruz
DF	Polegar	Central
DF	William Alves	Santa Cruz
MF	Jean Carlos	Náutico
MF	Didira	Santa Cruz
MF	Candinho	Afogados
FW	Diego Ceará	Afogados
FW	Pipico ^{a}	Santa Cruz
FW	Leandro Costa	Central

a. Top scorer

Source:Globo
