= 2024 Copa do Nordeste qualification =

Tournament details
- Country: Brazil
- Dates: 6 – 14 January 2024
- Teams: 16

Tournament statistics
- Matches played: 12
- Goals scored: 28 (2.33 per match)
- Top goal scorer(s): Feijão; Leandrinho; Leandro Amorim (2 goals each)

The 2024 Copa do Nordeste qualification (officially the Eliminatória da Copa do Nordeste 2024) was the qualifying tournament of the 2024 Copa do Nordeste. It was played from 6 to 14 January 2024. Sixteen teams competed to decide four places in the Copa do Nordeste.

== Format ==
The teams played a single-elimination tournament with the following rules:

- The tournament was played on a single-leg basis, with the higher-seeded team hosting the leg.
  - If tied, the penalty shoot-out was used to determine the winners.
- Extra time would not be played and away goals rule would not be used during the tournament.

=== Format changes ===
Starting from this season, the following format change was implemented:

- For the second round, the eight qualified teams were seeded by their CBF ranking and they were drawn into four ties, with the best seeded team playing against the eighth seeded team, the second-best seeded team facing the seventh-best, the third against the sixth and the fourth against the fifth. The higher-seeded team will host the leg.

== Qualified teams ==
Every federation had a team qualified by the 2023 CBF ranking, while the seven best placed federations in the 2023 CBF state ranking (Ceará, Bahia, Pernambuco, Alagoas, Maranhão, Rio Grande do Norte and Paraíba) earned an extra berth in the tournament by participating in their respective state championships.

Association	Team	Qualification method
(Alagoas) Alagoas; 2 berths	CSA	best placed team in the 2023 CBF ranking not already qualified
(Alagoas) Alagoas; 2 berths	ASA	2023 Campeonato Alagoano runners-up
(Bahia) Bahia; 2 berths	Juazeirense	best placed team in the 2023 CBF ranking not already qualified
(Bahia) Bahia; 2 berths	Jacuipense	2023 Campeonato Baiano runners-up
(Ceará) Ceará; 2 berths	Ferroviário	best placed team in the 2023 CBF ranking not already qualified
(Ceará) Ceará; 2 berths	Iguatu	2023 Campeonato Cearense 3rd place
(Maranhão) Maranhão; 2 berths	Sampaio Corrêa	best placed team in the 2023 CBF ranking not already qualified
(Maranhão) Maranhão; 2 berths	Moto Club	2023 Campeonato Maranhense runners-up
(Paraíba) Paraíba; 2 berths	Botafogo-PB	best placed team in the 2023 CBF ranking not already qualified
(Paraíba) Paraíba; 2 berths	Sousa	2023 Campeonato Paraibano runners-up
(Pernambuco) Pernambuco; 2 berths	Santa Cruz	best placed team in the 2023 CBF ranking not already qualified
(Pernambuco) Pernambuco; 2 berths	Retrô	2023 Campeonato Pernambucano runners-up
(Piauí) Piauí; 1 berth	Altos	best placed team in the 2023 CBF ranking not already qualified
(Rio Grande do Norte) Rio Grande do Norte; 2 berths	ABC	best placed team in the 2023 CBF ranking not already qualified
(Rio Grande do Norte) Rio Grande do Norte; 2 berths	Potiguar de Mossoró	2023 Campeonato Potiguar 3rd place
(Sergipe) Sergipe; 1 berth	Confiança	best placed team in the 2023 CBF ranking not already qualified

== Schedule ==
The schedule of the competition was as follows.

Round	First leg	Second leg
First round	6–7 January 2024	
Second round	13–14 January 2024	

== First round ==
=== Draw ===
The teams were seeded by their 2023 CBF ranking (shown in parentheses).

Pot
(Alagoas) CSA (28); (Maranhão) Sampaio Corrêa (32); (Rio Grande do Norte) ABC (44); (Sergipe) Confiança (47); (Ceará) Ferroviário (54); (Paraíba) Botafogo-PB (56); (Bahia) Juazeirense (57); (Piauí) Altos (58)	(Pernambuco) Santa Cruz (59); (Maranhão) Moto Club (66); (Bahia) Jacuipense (67); (Alagoas) ASA (87); (Pernambuco) Retrô (98); (Paraíba) Sousa (107); (Rio Grande do Norte) Potiguar de Mossoró (185); (Ceará) Iguatu (no rank)

For the first round, the sixteen teams were drawn into eight ties, with the best seeded team playing against the sixteenth seeded team, while the second-best seeded team facing the fifteenth-best, third against fourteenth, fourth against thirteenth, etc. The higher-seeded team hosted the leg.

=== Matches ===
Team 1	Score	Team 2
CSA (Alagoas)	1–1 (3–4 p)	(Ceará) Iguatu
Sampaio Corrêa (Maranhão)	2–2 (4–5 p)	(Rio Grande do Norte) Potiguar de Mossoró
ABC (Rio Grande do Norte)	1–0	(Paraíba) Sousa
Confiança (Sergipe)	1–1 (2–4 p)	(Pernambuco) Retrô
Ferroviário (Ceará)	1–1 (0–3 p)	(Alagoas) ASA
Botafogo-PB (Paraíba)	0–0 (3–1 p)	(Bahia) Jacuipense
Juazeirense (Bahia)	1–1 (4–1 p)	(Maranhão) Moto Club
Altos (Piauí)	2–2 (11–10 p)	(Pernambuco) Santa Cruz

6 January 2024
16:00

Confiança (Sergipe)	1–1	(Pernambuco) Retrô
Fábio Silva 66'	Report	Fernandinho 48'
Penalties
Rafael Furtado (penalty missed); Claudinho (penalty scored); André Lima (penalty scored); Willians Santana (penalty missed)	2–4	(penalty scored) Jean; (penalty scored) Radsley; (penalty scored) Renato Henrique; (penalty scored) Luisinho

Batistão, Aracaju
Referee: Luciano da Silva Miranda Filho (Ceará)

6 January 2024
16:00

Ferroviário (Ceará)	1–1	(Alagoas) ASA
Soares 50'	Report	Feijão 88'
Penalties
Ciel (penalty missed); Wesley (penalty missed); Gabryel Martins (penalty missed)	0–3	(penalty scored) Didira; (penalty scored) Feijão; (penalty scored) Iago

Estádio Presidente Vargas, Fortaleza
Referee: Paulo José Souza Mourão (Maranhão)

6 January 2024
19:00

CSA (Alagoas)	1–1	(Ceará) Iguatu
Marquinhos 79'	Report	Willian Anicete 90+3'
Penalties
Kevin (penalty scored); Marquinhos (penalty missed); Vinícius Popó (penalty scored); Pedro Favela (penalty missed); Jean Cléber (penalty scored)	3–4	(penalty scored) Otacílio Marcos; (penalty scored) Willian Anicete; (penalty missed) Davi Torres; (penalty scored) Diego Viana; (penalty scored) Guto

Estádio Rei Pelé, Maceió
Referee: Fábio Augusto Santos Sá Júnior (Sergipe)

6 January 2024
19:00

ABC (Rio Grande do Norte)	1–0	(Paraíba) Sousa
Daniel Cruz 47'	Report

Frasqueirão, Natal
Referee: Rafael Carlos Salgueiro Lima (Alagoas)

7 January 2024
16:00

Sampaio Corrêa (Maranhão)	2–2	(Rio Grande do Norte) Potiguar de Mossoró
Cláudio Cebolinha 16'; Thallyson 74'	Report	Sampaio 52' (pen.); Geovani Silva 90+6'
Penalties
Bruno Cortez (penalty missed); Bruno Baio (penalty scored); Fábio Aguiar (penalty scored); Pimentinha (penalty scored); Maurício (penalty scored); Pablo Oliveira (penalty missed)	4–5	(penalty scored) Walber; (penalty scored) Anderson Júnior; (penalty missed) Jefinho; (penalty scored) Paulo Ricardo; (penalty scored) Fernando Portel; (penalty scored) Talisson

Castelão, São Luís
Referee: Afro Rocha de Carvalho Filho (Paraíba)

7 January 2024
16:00

Juazeirense (Bahia)	1–1	(Maranhão) Moto Club
Leandrinho 8'	Report	Léo Silva 51'
Penalties
Clébson (penalty scored); Janeudo (penalty scored); Ian Augusto (penalty scored); Patrik (penalty scored)	4–1	(penalty scored) Geovani; (penalty missed) Léo Silva; (penalty missed) Everton

Estádio Adauto Moraes, Juazeiro
Referee: Leonilson Fernandes Trigueiro Filho (Rio Grande do Norte)

7 January 2024
19:00

Botafogo-PB (Paraíba)	0–0	(Bahia) Jacuipense
	Report
Penalties
Wendel Lomar (penalty scored); Erick (penalty missed); Gabriel Rossetto (penalty scored); Igor Souza (penalty missed); Rafael Furlan (penalty scored)	3–1	(penalty missed) Jeam; (penalty missed) Vítor Salvador; (penalty scored) Flavinho; (penalty missed) Eudair

Almeidão, João Pessoa
Referee: Gilberto Rodrigues Castro Júnior (Pernambuco)

7 January 2024
19:00

Altos (Piauí)	2–2	(Pernambuco) Santa Cruz
Leandro Amorim 50'; Matheus Taumaturgo 80'	Report	Thiaguinho 23'; Lucas Siqueira 43'
Penalties
Rhuann (penalty scored); Dhonata (penalty scored); Ricardo Santana (penalty scored); Arthurzinho (penalty scored); Matheus Taumaturgo (penalty scored); Digão (penalty scored); João Pedro (penalty scored); Arlan (penalty scored); Luis Guilherme (penalty missed); Leandro Amorim (penalty scored); Careca (penalty scored); Rhuann (penalty scored)	11–10	(penalty scored) Rafael Pereira; (penalty scored) Carlos Henrique; (penalty scored) Toty; (penalty scored) Caio Mello; (penalty scored) Gabriel Cardoso; (penalty scored) João Diogo; (penalty scored) Juan Tavares; (penalty scored) Felipe Cardoso; (penalty missed) Paulo César; (penalty scored) Luis Felipe; (penalty scored) André Luiz; (penalty missed) Rafael Pereira

Estádio Lindolfo Monteiro, Teresina
Referee: Wagner Francisco Silva Souza (Bahia)

== Second round ==
=== Draw ===
The teams were seeded by their 2023 CBF ranking (shown in parentheses).

Pot
(Rio Grande do Norte) ABC (44); (Paraíba) Botafogo-PB (56); (Bahia) Juazeirense (57); (Piauí) Altos (58)	(Alagoas) ASA (87); (Pernambuco) Retrô (98); (Rio Grande do Norte) Potiguar de Mossoró (185); (Ceará) Iguatu (no rank)

For the second round, the eight teams were drawn into four ties, with the best seeded team playing against the eighth seeded team, the second-best seeded team facing the seventh-best, the third against the sixth and the fourth against the fifth. The higher-seeded team hosted the leg.

=== Matches ===
Team 1	Score	Team 2
ABC (Rio Grande do Norte)	1–1 (4–2 p)	(Ceará) Iguatu
Botafogo-PB (Paraíba)	1–1 (4–2 p)	(Rio Grande do Norte) Potiguar de Mossoró
Juazeirense (Bahia)	4–0	(Pernambuco) Retrô
Altos (Piauí)	2–1	(Alagoas) ASA

13 January 2024
16:00

Juazeirense (Bahia)	4–0	(Pernambuco) Retrô
Ian Augusto 2'; Leandrinho 35'; Luís Soares 67'; Janeudo 90+3' (pen.)	Report

Estádio Adauto Moraes, Juazeiro
Referee: Dênis da Silva Ribeiro Serafim (Alagoas)

13 January 2024
19:00

ABC (Rio Grande do Norte)	1–1	(Ceará) Iguatu
Parraguez 84'	Report	Max Oliveira 14'
Penalties
Diego Jardel (penalty scored); Léo Guerra (penalty scored); Wesley (penalty missed); Parraguez (penalty scored); Romário (penalty scored)	4–2	(penalty scored) Max Oliveira; (penalty missed) Dentinho; (penalty scored) Guto; (penalty missed) André Mascena

Frasqueirão, Natal
Referee: Antônio Dib Moraes de Sousa (Piauí)

14 January 2024
16:00

Botafogo-PB (Paraíba)	1–1	(Rio Grande do Norte) Potiguar de Mossoró
Lenon 48'	Report	Talisson 51'
Penalties
Wendel Lomar (penalty scored); Gabriel Rossetto (penalty scored); Rafael Furlan (penalty missed); Sousa Tibiri (penalty scored); Kiko (penalty scored)	4–2	(penalty scored) Sampaio; (penalty missed) Anderson Júnior; (penalty missed) Pecel; (penalty scored) Paulo Ricardo

Almeidão, João Pessoa
Referee: Marielson Alves Silva (Bahia)

14 January 2024
19:00

Altos (Piauí)	2–1	(Alagoas) ASA
Leandro Amorim 62'; Rhuann 90+4'	Report	Feijão 53'

Estádio Lindolfo Monteiro, Teresina
Referee: Léo Simão Holanda (Ceará)

== 2024 Copa do Nordeste qualified teams ==
The following four teams qualified for the 2024 Copa do Nordeste.

State	Team
Rio Grande do Norte	ABC
Paraíba	Botafogo-PB
Bahia	Juazeirense
Piauí	Altos

== Top goalscorers ==
Rank	Player	Team	Goals
1	(Brazil) Feijão	(Alagoas) ASA	2
1	(Brazil) Leandrinho	(Bahia) Juazeirense	2
1	(Brazil) Leandro Amorim	(Piauí) Altos	2

Source:CBF
