= Roberto de Jesus =

Roberto de Jesus may refer to:

- Roberto de Jesus (footballer) (born 1969), Brazilian football manager and centre-back
- Roberto de Jesús (volleyball) (fl. 2006-2008), Dominican volleyball player
