= Rafael Ribeiro =

Rafael Ribeiro may refer to:

- Rafael Ribeiro (athlete)
- Rafael Ribeiro (footballer)
