= Sávio (footballer, born 1996) =

Brazilian footballer

Personal information
- Full name: Sávio Alves Marchiote
- Date of birth: 5 August 1996 (age 30)
- Place of birth: Natividade, Rio de Janeiro, Brazil
- Height: 1.71 m (5 ft 7 1/2 in)
- Position: Right-back

Team information
- Current team: Operário Ferroviário

Senior career*
| Years | Team | Apps | (Gls) |
| 2017 | Monte Azul | 0 | (0) |
| 2017 | Ponte Preta | 0 | (0) |
| 2018 | Rio Preto | 1 | (0) |
| 2018 | Votuporanguense | 21 | (1) |
| 2019–2020 | Coritiba | 15 | (0) |
| 2020 | → Operário Ferroviário (loan) | 42 | (0) |
| 2021 | Sampaio Corrêa | 7 | (0) |
| 2021–2022 | Botafogo-PB | 25 | (1) |
| 2023– | Operário Ferroviário | 34 | (2) |
- * Club domestic league appearances and goals as of 28 October 2023

Sávio Alves Marchiote (born 5 August 1996), commonly known as Sávio, is a Brazilian footballer who plays as a right-back for Operário Ferroviário.

== Career ==
Sávio started his career with Monte Azul in the third division of Campeonato Paulista and was signed by Ponte Preta in May 2017 to play in the youth sector, being named as a senior squad substitute for the last game of the 2017 Campeonato Brasileiro Série A season. In 2018 he had a short spell with Rio Preto and then moved to Votuporanguense where he played in 21 of the 22 games of the clubs winning 2018 Copa Paulista campaign. In January 2019 he signed for Coritiba.

Sávio made his national league debut in the 2019 Campeonato Brasileiro Série B as a first half substitute in the 3–2 win over Paraná Clube on 8 June 2019.
