= Dadá Belmonte =

Brazilian footballer (born 1997)

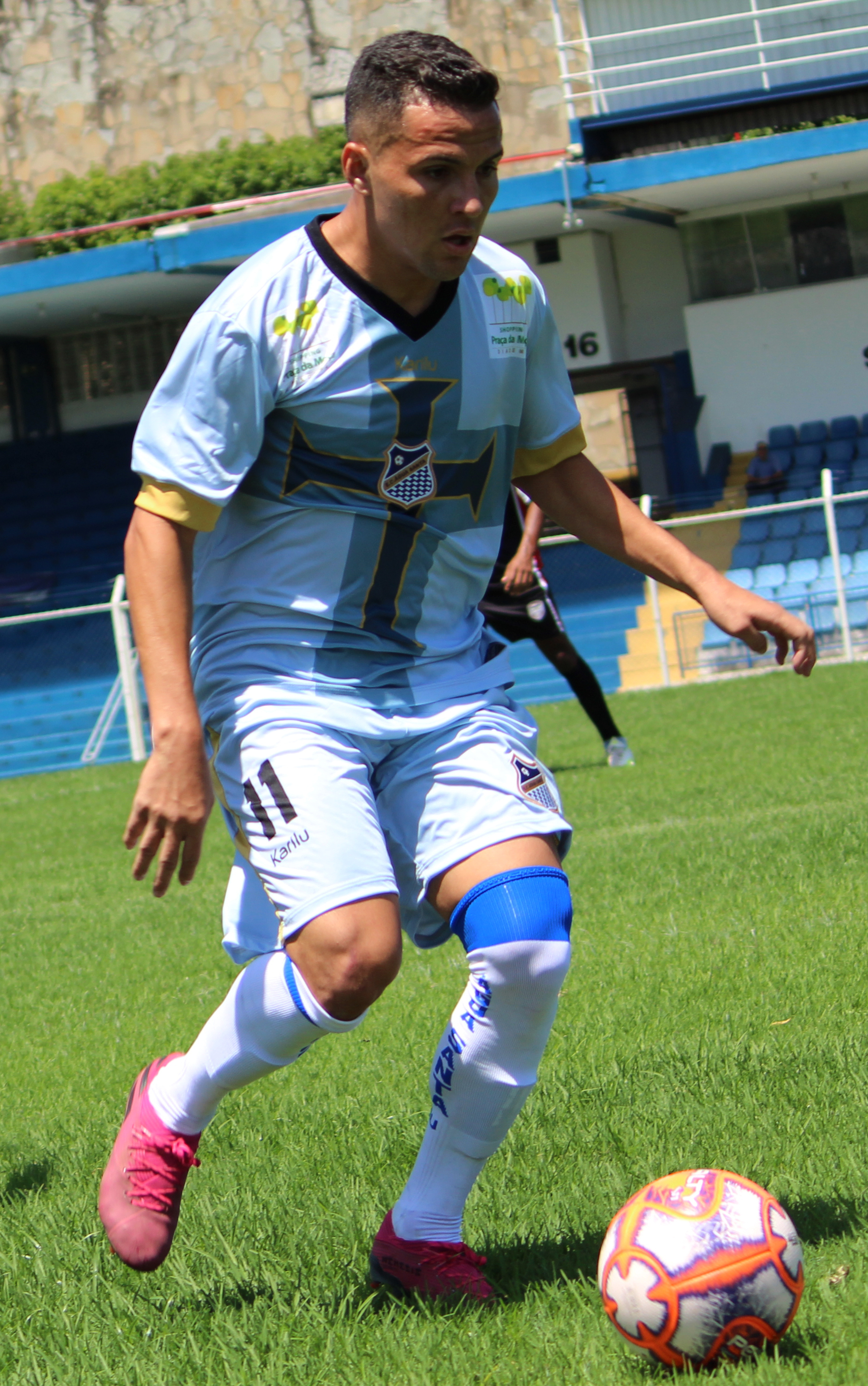
- Dadá Belmonte with Água Santa in 2019

Personal information
- Full name: Adailson Freire Pereira da Silva
- Date of birth: 8 February 1997 (age 29)
- Place of birth: São José do Belmonte, Brazil
- Height: 1.66 m (5 ft 5 in)
- Position: Left winger

Team information
- Current team: CRB
- Number: 97

Youth career
- 2015–2017: Salgueiro
- 2017: → Internacional (loan)

Senior career*
Years	Team	Apps	(Gls)
2016–2018	Salgueiro	61	(6)
2019–2022	Água Santa	58	(22)
2019	→ Ponte Preta (loan)	18	(0)
2020–2021	→ Náutico (loan)	31	(2)
2021	→ Goiás (loan)	36	(3)
2022	→ Goiás (loan)	33	(2)
2023	América Mineiro	7	(1)
2023	Chornomorets Odesa (loan)	8	(0)
2025–	CRB	68	(9)
- * Club domestic league appearances and goals as of 16 November 2026

Adailson Freire Pereira da Silva (born 8 February 1997), known as Dadá Belmonte or simply Dadá, is a Brazilian footballer who plays as a left winger for CRB.

== Club career ==
=== Salgueiro ===
Born in São José do Belmonte, Pernambuco, Dadá joined Salgueiro's youth setup in 2015. Promoted to the first team for the 2016 season, he made his senior debut on 1 March of that year, coming on as a late substitute in a 3–1 Campeonato Pernambucano away win against América-PE.

After being rarely used in 2016, Dadá started to feature more regularly in 2017, and scored his first goal on 18 January by netting his team's third in a 3–1 win at América-PE. On 17 October 2017, he was loaned to Internacional, but only appeared for their under-23 team.

=== Água Santa ===
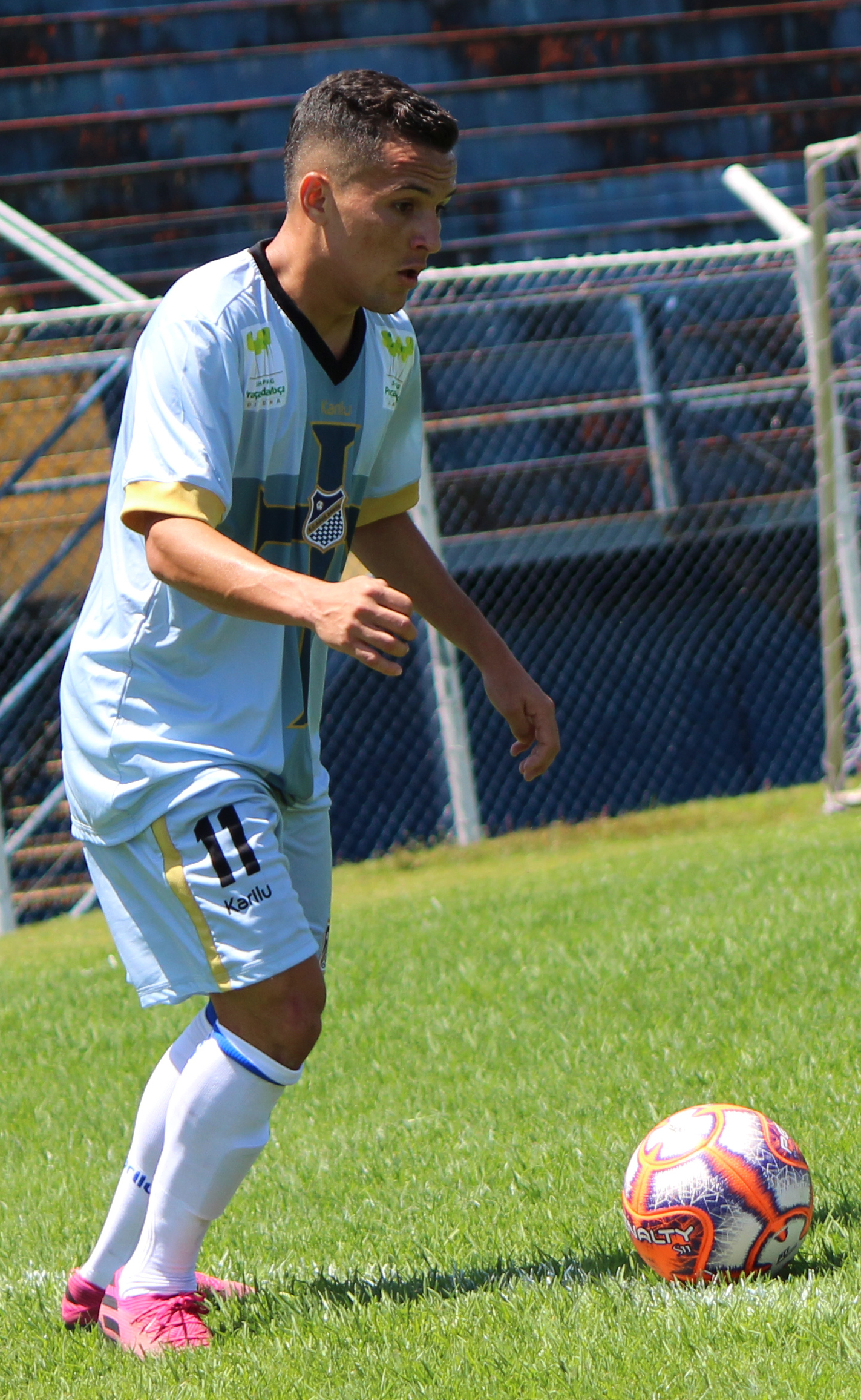
Dadá Belmonte with Água Santa in 2019

Dadá moved to Água Santa for the 2019 campaign, and helped the club in their promotion from the Campeonato Paulista Série A2 with nine goals. He was the second-best top scorer of the competition, only two goals behind teammate Alvinho.

==== Loan to Ponte Preta ====
On 14 May 2019, Dadá was loaned to Série B side Ponte Preta until the end of the year. He was sparingly used during his period at the club, starting in only three matches.

==== Loan to Náutico ====
After suffering relegation from the 2020 Campeonato Paulista with Água Santa, Dadá was loaned to another Série B club, Náutico, until the end of the campaign. He featured regularly during his loan spell, scoring twice in 31 appearances as his side narrowly avoided relegation.

==== Loans to Goiás ====
Back to Água Santa for the 2021 season, Dadá scored seven times and helped in their promotion from the Paulista A2 before moving on loan to Goiás on 2 June 2021. On 4 December, after helping the latter team in their promotion to the Série A, he agreed to return to Água Santa for the 2022 Campeonato Paulista and then rejoin Goiás on loan.

Dadá made his top tier debut on 16 April 2022, starting in a 1–1 home draw against Palmeiras. Regularly used, he scored his first goal in the category on 23 July, netting the opener in a 3–3 draw at São Paulo.

=== América Mineiro ===
On 25 December 2022, Dadá was announced at fellow first division side América Mineiro on a three-year contract.

==== Loan to Chornomorets Odesa ====
On 18 August 2023, Dadá was loaned to Ukrainian Premier League side Chornomorets Odesa until the 30 June 2024.

== Career statistics ==
As of 2 March 2023

Club	Season	League			State League		Cup		Continental		Other		Total	
Club	Season	Division	Apps	Goals	Apps	Goals	Apps	Goals	Apps	Goals	Apps	Goals	Apps	Goals
Salgueiro	2016	Série C	1	0	2	0	0	0	—		0	0	3	0
Salgueiro	2017	Série C	12	0	10	2	1	0	—		—		23	2
Salgueiro	2018	Série C	16	2	11	2	1	0	—		7 (Note: Appearance(s) in Copa do Nordeste)	0	35	4
Salgueiro	Total		29	2	23	4	2	0	—		7	0	61	6
Água Santa	2019	Paulista A2	—		15	9	—		—		—		15	9
Água Santa	2020	Paulista	—		10	1	—		—		—		10	1
Água Santa	2021	Paulista A2	—		19	7	—		—		—		19	7
Água Santa	2022	Paulista	—		14	5	—		—		—		14	5
Água Santa	Total		—		58	22	—		—		—		58	22
Ponte Preta (loan)	2019	Série B	18	0	—		—		—		—		18	0
Náutico (loan)	2020	Série B	31	2	—		—		—		—		31	2
Goiás (loan)	2021	Série B	36	3	—		—		—		—		36	3
Goiás (loan)	2022	Série A	33	2	—		4	0	—		—		37	2
América Mineiro	2023	Série A	0	0	6	1	1	0	0	0	—		7	1
Career total			147	9	87	27	7	0	0	0	7	0	248	36
