= Rafael Furlan =

Brazilian footballer (born 1994)

Personal information
- Full name: Rafael Furlan Soares
- Date of birth: 20 September 1994 (age 32)
- Place of birth: Quirinópolis, Brazil
- Height: 1.77 m (5 ft 10 in)
- Position: Left-back

Team information
- Current team: Amazonas

Youth career
- 2013: Joinville

Senior career*
Years	Team	Apps	(Gls)
2014–2016	Joinville	3	(0)
2015	→ Metropolitano (loan)	0	(0)
2016	→ Anápolis (loan)	10	(1)
2016–2017	Anápolis	13	(0)
2017–2022	Grêmio Anápolis	4	(0)
2017–2018	→ Chaves (loan)	11	(0)
2018–2019	→ Estoril (loan)	26	(1)
2019	→ Farense (loan)	6	(0)
2020	→ Vilafranquense (loan)	6	(1)
2020–2021	→ Leixões (loan)	13	(0)
2022	Caxias	11	(0)
2023	Patrocinense	9	(0)
2023	Paraná	5	(0)
2023	Novo Hamburgo	3	(1)
2024	Botafogo-PB	21	(1)
2025	Floresta	24	(2)
2026–	Amazonas	5	(0)
- * Club domestic league appearances and goals as of 10 November 2026

Rafael Furlan Soares (born 20 September 1994), known as Rafael Furlan, is a Brazilian footballer who plays as left-back for Amazonas.

== Club career ==
He made his Primeira Liga debut for Chaves on 14 August 2017 in a game against Benfica.
