= Felipe Cardoso =

Brazilian footballer

Personal information
- Full name: Felipe Cardoso
- Date of birth: 4 March 2003 (age 23)
- Place of birth: São Paulo, Brazil
- Height: 1.79 m (5 ft 10 in)
- Position: Attacking midfielder

Team information
- Current team: Vitória
- Number: 76

Youth career
- 2016–2018: Santos
- 2019: Flamengo
- 2020: Red Bull Brasil
- 2021–2022: Red Bull Bragantino
- 2023: Ibrachina
- 2023: Santa Cruz

Senior career*
Years	Team	Apps	(Gls)
2023–2024	Santa Cruz	8	(0)
2024	→ Metropolitano (loan)	2	(0)
2025	Atlético de Alagoinhas	10	(4)
2025	→ Vitória (loan)	1	(0)
2025–	Vitória	2	(0)
- * Club domestic league appearances and goals as of 13 December 2025

Felipe Cardoso (born 4 March 2003) is a Brazilian professional footballer who plays as an attacking midfielder for Vitória.

== Career ==
Cardoso began his career in the youth sectors at Santos FC. In 2014, he transferred to Flamengo where he was Brazilian under-17 champion, and victim of the fire at CT Ninho do Urubu, where ten players died. He also had spells in the youth teams of Red Bull Brasil, Red Bull Bragantino, Ibrachina and Santa Cruz, where he made his professional debut in 2023. He was loaned in 2024 to Metropolitano, and in 2025 he signed with Atlético de Alagoinhas. On 17 March 2025, his loan to EC Vitória was announced, being acquired definitively in July, until December 2026.

== Honours ==
Flamengo U17

- Campeonato Brasileiro Sub-17: 2019
