= Roberto de Jesus (footballer) =

Brazilian football manager and former player

Roberto
Personal information
- Full name: Roberto de Jesus Assis
- Date of birth: 5 May 1969 (age 57)
- Place of birth: Salvador, Brazil
- Height: 1.85 m (6 ft 1 in)
- Position: Centre back

Team information
- Current team: Coruripe (head coach)

Youth career
- Bahia

Senior career*
Years	Team	Apps	(Gls)
1990–1991	Industrial		
1992	Tanabi		
1993	Fernandópolis		
1994	Mirassol		
1995	Botafogo-SP		
1996	União Barbarense		
1997	Paraguaçuense		
1997	Tupã-SP		
1998	Nacional-SP		
1999	Tubarão		
1999–2000	Figueirense		
2001	Joinville		
2001	Paraná	13	(0)
2002	Joinville		
2002–2003	Paraná	8	(0)
2003	Joinville		
2004–2008	Santa Cruz		

Managerial career
- 2008: Fernandópolis
- 2009: Central
- 2011: Ypiranga-PE
- 2014–2015: Pesqueira
- 2018–2019: América-PE
- 2021: Santa Cruz (assistant)
- 2021: Santa Cruz (interim)
- 2022: Fernandópolis
- 2023: Fernandópolis U20
- 2024–: Coruripe
- * Club domestic league appearances and goals

Roberto de Jesus Assis (born 5 May 1969), known as Roberto de Jesus or just Roberto, is a Brazilian football coach and former player who played as a central defender. He is the current head coach of Coruripe.

== Playing career ==
Born in Salvador, Bahia, Roberto began his senior career with Industrial in 1990. After playing for lowly sides in the São Paulo state, he moved to Tubarão in 1999 before joining Figueirense later in the same year.

Roberto moved to Joinville for the 2001 season, and signed for Série A side Paraná in July of that year. He returned to JEC in 2002 before again playing in the top tier for Paraná.

In April 2003, Roberto returned to Joinville. He moved to Santa Cruz in January 2004, and retired with the club in 2008.

== Managerial career ==
Shortly after retiring, Roberto was named manager of Fernandópolis, a club he represented as a player. He was appointed in charge of Central, being also shortlisted to the Best Manager of the 2009 Campeonato Pernambucano.

On 24 January 2011, after more than a year without a club, Roberto was named manager of Ypiranga-PE, but was sacked on 20 March. He took over Pesqueira in 2014, but was dismissed on 15 January 2015.

On 10 January 2018, Roberto was named at the helm of América-PE. He was relieved of his duties on 12 February 2019, and returned to Santa Cruz in February 2021 as an assistant.

In April 2021, Roberto was an interim manager of Santa, after João Brigatti was sacked.

== Honours ==
=== Player ===
Joinville

- Campeonato Catarinense: 2001

Santa Cruz

- Campeonato Pernambucano: 2005
