= João Brigatti =

Brazilian footballer (born 1964)

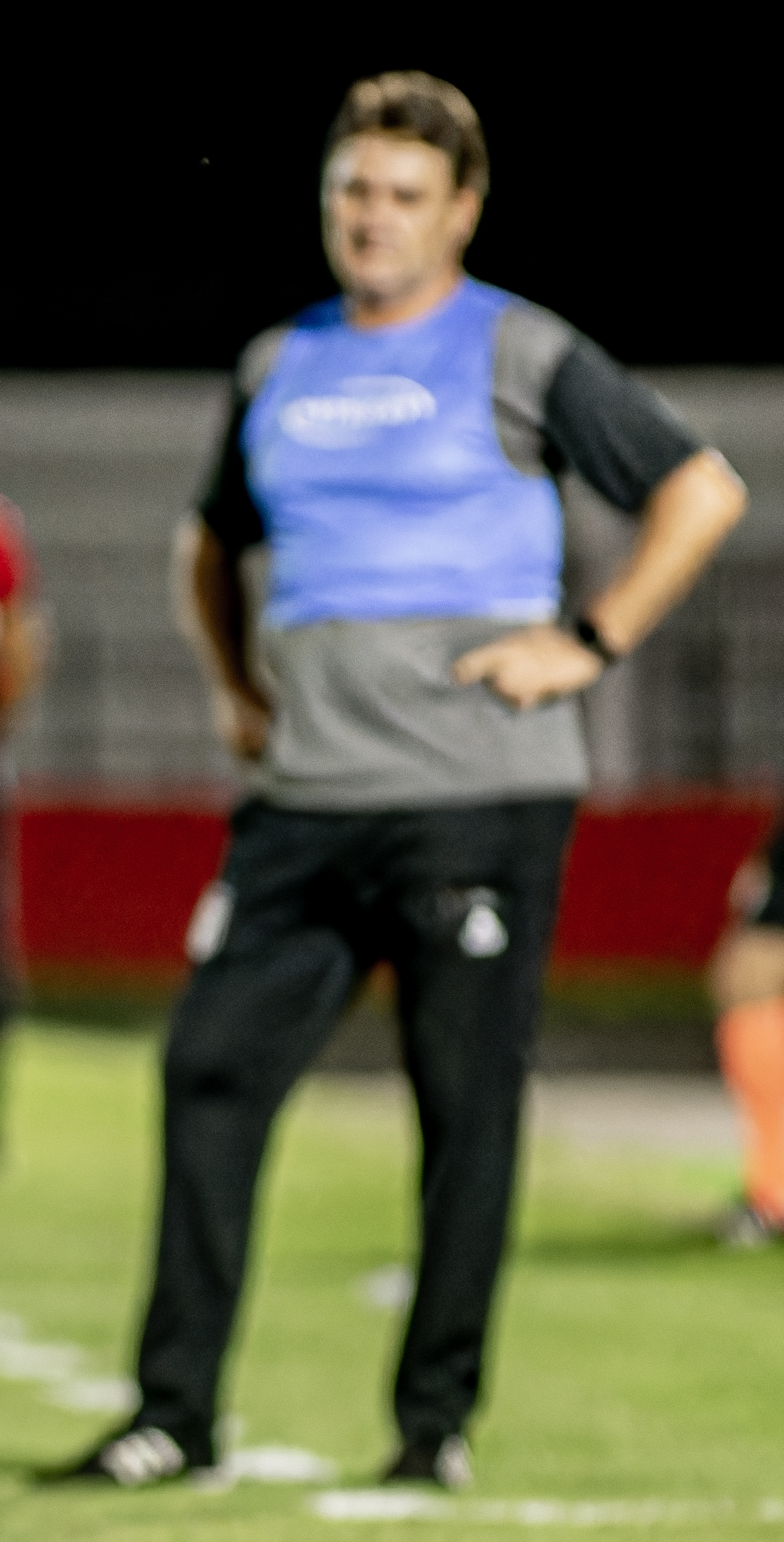
- Brigatti in 2024

Personal information
- Full name: João Dermival Brigatti
- Date of birth: 14 March 1964 (age 62)
- Place of birth: Campinas, Brazil
- Height: 1.91 m (6 ft 3 in)
- Position: Goalkeeper

Team information
- Current team: Ponte Preta (football coordinator)

Youth career
- 1975–1983: Ponte Preta

Senior career*
Years	Team	Apps	(Gls)
1983–1987	Ponte Preta		
1987–1992	Bandeirante		
1992	America-SP		
1993	Rio Branco-SP		
1993	Desportiva		
1994	Ponte Preta		
1994	Remo		
1995	Santa Cruz		
1996	Caldense		
1996	Santa Cruz		

International career
1981–1983	Brazil U20	1	(0)

Managerial career
- 2014: Paysandu (assistant)
- 2014: Bragantino (assistant)
- 2015: Botafogo-SP (assistant)
- 2016: CRB (assistant)
- 2016–2018: Ponte Preta (assistant)
- 2017: Ponte Preta (interim)
- 2018: Ponte Preta (interim)
- 2018: Ponte Preta (interim)
- 2018–2019: Paysandu
- 2019–2020: Sampaio Corrêa
- 2020: Ponte Preta
- 2020–2021: Paysandu
- 2021: Santa Cruz
- 2021: Oeste
- 2021–2022: Sampaio Corrêa
- 2022: América de Natal
- 2022: Manaus
- 2023–2024: Ponte Preta
- 2024: Ponte Preta
Medal record
Men's football
Representing Brazil
Pan American Games
Silver medal – second place	1983 Caracas	Team
- * Club domestic league appearances and goals

João Dermival Brigatti (born 14 March 1964) is a Brazilian professional football coach and former player who played as a goalkeeper. He is the current football coordinator of Ponte Preta.

== Career ==
Born in Campinas, São Paulo, Brigatti was a Ponte Preta youth graduate. However, he never established himself as a regular starter at the club, and had subsequent spells at Bandeirante, America-SP, Rio Branco-SP, Desportiva, Remo, Santa Cruz and Caldense. He retired in 1996, aged 32, with Santa.

Shortly after retiring, Brigatti started working as a goalkeeping coach at his first team Ponte Preta. In 2011, he joined Theodore Whitmore's staff at the Jamaica national team, again as a goalkeeping coach. After working in the same role at Chunnam Dragons FC, he was appointed Mazola Júnior's assistant at Paysandu for the 2014 season.

After following Mazola at Bragantino, Botafogo-SP and CRB, Brigatti returned to Ponte on 7 December 2016, as an assistant coach. He also acted as interim head coach on three occasions for the Macaca before leaving in 2018.

On 3 September 2018, Brigatti returned to Paysandu, now being named head coach of the first team. He was sacked the following 18 March, and was appointed in charge of Sampaio Corrêa on 27 June.

Brigatti returned to Ponte on 20 February 2020, replacing sacked Gilson Kleina. Sacked on 2 October, he rejoined Paysandu for a third spell late in the month.

After narrowly missing out promotion in the 2020 Série C, Brigatti left Papão on 18 January 2021, and was named in charge of another club he represented as a player, Santa Cruz, on 19 February. Dismissed on 11 April, he took over fellow third division side Oeste on 26 July, but resigned on 10 July, after just four matches.

Brigatti returned to Sampaio on 30 October 2021, and managed to avoid relegation with the club in the 2021 Série B. Sacked on 20 March of the following year, he was named América de Natal head coach on 1 May 2022, but left on 28 June to take over Manaus FC.

Brigatti resigned from Manaus on 19 July 2022, after having discrepancies with the club's board. On 25 July 2023, after more than a year unemployed, he returned to Ponte as a technical coordinator.

On 2 October 2023, Brigatti was named head coach of Ponte again, after Pintado was sacked. The following 29 February, he renewed his contract with the club, but resigned on 27 May.

On 6 November 2024, Brigatti returned to Ponte for the final three matches of the season. Unable to avoid relegation, he returned to a coordinator role on 22 November.

== Honours ==
=== Player ===
Remo

- Campeonato Paraense: 1994

Santa Cruz

- Campeonato Pernambucano: 1995
