= Willian Anicete =

Brazilian footballer

Personal information
- Full name: Willian da Silva Anicete
- Date of birth: 31 January 1994 (age 32)
- Place of birth: Juazeiro do Norte, Brazil
- Height: 1.77 m (5 ft 10 in)
- Position: Forward

Team information
- Current team: Caruaru City

Youth career
- 2011: Sport Recife
- 2012–2014: Náutico

Senior career*
| Years | Team | Apps | (Gls) |
| 2013–2014 | Náutico | | |
| 2014–2015 | Central | | |
| 2015–2017 | Santos | | |
| 2016 | → Vitória-PE (loan) | | |
| 2016 | → Portuguesa Santista (loan) | | |
| 2017 | → Náutico (loan) | | |
| 2017 | → Salgueiro (loan) | | |
| 2017–2021 | Salgueiro | | |
| 2020 | → Tombense (loan) | | |
| 2021 | → ABC (loan) | | |
| 2021 | XV de Piracicaba | | |
| 2022 | Juazeirense | | |
| 2022 | Campinense | | |
| 2022 | Icasa | | |
| 2023 | Campinense | | |
| 2023 | Pacajus | | |
| 2024 | Iguatu | | |
| 2024 | Nacional de Patos | | |
| 2024–2025 | Altos | | |
| 2025 | → Maranhão (loan) | | |
| 2025– | Caruaru City | | |
- * Club domestic league appearances and goals as of 24 October 2025

Willian Anicete (born 31 January 1994), is a Brazilian professional footballer who plays as a forward for Caruaru City.

== Career ==
Anicete played in the youth teams of Sport and Náutico. In 2013, he was promoted to professional, being a substitute in some games. He played for Central and was signed by Santos FC, where he couldn't find a place and was loaned out a few times. For Portuguesa Santista in 2016, he was champion and top scorer in the fourth division of São Paulo. He played for teams in all divisions of Brazil, notably Salgueiro, Tombense and ABC, being runner-up in the state for these teams.

Hired by Iguatu for the 2024 season, he scored the equalizer in the match against CSA in the preliminary phase of the 2024 Copa do Nordeste, where Iguatu advanced on penalty kicks. In May 2024, Anicete signed with Altos. In 2025, after playing in the Campeonato Maranhense for Maranhão AC, Anicete was traded to Caruaru City.

== Honours ==
Portuguesa Santista

- Campeonato Paulista Série A4: 2016

Maranhão

- Campeonato Maranhense: 2025

Individual

- 2016 Campeonato Paulista Série A4 top scorer: 19 goals
