= Elivélton (footballer, born May 1992) =

Brazilian footballer

Personal information
- Full name: Elivélton Viana dos Santos
- Date of birth: May 10, 1992 (age 34)
- Place of birth: Bom Jardim, Brazil
- Height: 1.80 m (5 ft 11 in)
- Position: Centre back

Team information
- Current team: Boavista

Youth career
- Fluminense

Senior career*
Years	Team	Apps	(Gls)
2011–2016	Fluminense	62	(3)
2015	→ Náutico (loan)	6	(0)
2016	→ Fortaleza (loan)	7	(0)
2017	Tupi	11	(0)
2018–2022	Boavista	54	(3)
2018	→ CSA (loan)	7	(0)
2019	→ Vila Nova (loan)	5	(0)
2020	→ Santa Cruz (loan)	7	(1)
2022	Joinville	10	(0)
2023–	Boavista	9	(0)
- * Club domestic league appearances and goals as of 17:35, 7 April 2024 (UTC)

Elivélton Viana dos Santos (born May 10, 1992), known as Elivélton, is a Brazilian footballer who plays for Boavista.

== Career ==
=== Fluminense ===
Elivélton made his league debut against Athletico Paranaense on 1 July 2011. He scored his first goal for the club against Coritiba on 10 August 2014, scoring in the 25th minute.

=== Náutico ===
Elivélton made his league debut against Salgueiro on 1 February 2015.

=== Fortaleza ===
Elivélton made his league debut against América FC (RN) on 7 June 2016.

=== Tupi ===
Elivélton made his league debut against Tombense on 29 January 2017.

=== Boavista ===
Elivélton made his league debut against Fluminense on 17 January 2018. He scored his first goal for the club against Nova Iguaçu on 25 February 2018, scoring in the 77th minute.

=== CSA ===
Elivélton made his league debut against Goiás on 14 April 2018.

=== Vila Nova ===
Elivélton made his league debut against Sport Recife on 21 August 2019.

=== Santa Cruz ===
Elivélton scored on his league debut against Remo on 13 September 2020, scoring in the 69th minute.

=== Joinville ===
Elivélton made his league debut against Figueirense on 23 January 2022.

=== Second spell at Boavista ===
During his second spell at Boavista, Elivélton made his league debut against AA Portuguesa (RJ) on 19 January 2023.

== Honours ==
Fluminense

- Campeonato Brasileiro Série A: 2012
- Campeonato Carioca: 2012
- Taça Guanabara: 2012
