= Fabiano (footballer, born 1990) =

Brazilian footballer

Personal information
- Full name: Fabiano da Silva Souza
- Date of birth: 17 February 1990 (age 36)
- Place of birth: Campo Grande, Brazil
- Height: 1.80 m (5 ft 11 in)
- Position: Left back

Team information
- Current team: Amazonas
- Number: 6

Senior career*
Years	Team	Apps	(Gls)
2010–2012	CENE	33	(0)
2012	→ São José-RS (loan)	7	(0)
2013–2015	XV de Piracicaba	11	(0)
2015	Mirassol	0	(0)
2016	Itumbiara	13	(0)
2016	Remo	5	(0)
2016–2018	Bragantino	76	(1)
2017	→ Água Santa (loan)	0	(0)
2018–2020	Vitória	12	(1)
2019	→ Coritiba (loan)	20	(0)
2020	→ Santa Cruz (loan)	10	(1)
2020–2021	→ Operário Ferroviário (loan)	31	(0)
2021–2022	Operário Ferroviário	81	(2)
2023	Portuguesa	5	(0)
2023	Confiança	5	(0)
2023	Chapecoense	5	(0)
2024–	Amazonas	74	(2)
- * Club domestic league appearances and goals as of 18 December 2025

Fabiano da Silva Souza (born 17 February 1990), simply known as Fabiano, is a Brazilian footballer who plays as left back for Amazonas.

== Career ==
Fabiano came through the youth ranks at CENE and made his senior debut in the 2010 Campeonato Brasileiro Série D game against Madureira on 7 August 2010. He played three seasons in Série D for the club, and had a loan spell at São José-RS in 2012, before signing for XV de Piracicaba in June 2013 to play in the 2013 Copa Paulista and 2014 Campeonato Paulista.

After four seasons of playing state league football in Campeonato Paulista and Campeonato Goiano he had a brief, largely unsuccessful spell with Remo in 2016. He signed for Bragantino soon after leaving Remo, and played three seasons in Série B and Série C with them, a period which also encompassed a loan spell with Água Santa in 2017 after the Série C campaign had finished.

In September 2018 he signed a contract with Vitória until the end of 2020, initially playing in the 2018 Campeonato Brasileiro Série A before being loaned to Coritiba for the 2019 season as part of the deal which saw Ruy being loaned in the other direction.

== Career statistics ==
As of 17 March 2023

Club	Season	League			State League		Cup		Conmebol		Other		Total	
Club	Season	Division	Apps	Goals	Apps	Goals	Apps	Goals	Apps	Goals	Apps	Goals	Apps	Goals
CENE	2010	Série D	2	0	4	0	—		—		—		6	0
CENE	2011	Série D	4	0	15	0	—		—		—		19	0
CENE	2012	Série D	8	0	—		—		—		—		8	0
CENE	Total		14	0	19	0	—		—		—		33	0
São José-RS (loan)	2012	Gaúcho	—		7	0	—		—		—		7	0
XV de Piracicaba	2013	Paulista	—		—		—		—		20 (Note: Appearance(s) in Copa Paulista)	1	20	1
XV de Piracicaba	2014	Paulista	—		3	0	—		—		—		3	0
XV de Piracicaba	2015	Paulista	—		8	0	—		—		—		8	0
XV de Piracicaba	Total		—		11	0	—		—		20	1	31	1
Mirassol	2015	Paulista A2	—		0	0	—		—		8	0	8	0
Itumbiara	2016	Goiano	—		13	0	—		—		—		13	0
Remo	2016	Série C	5	0	—		1	0	—		—		6	0
Bragantino	2016	Série B	8	0	—		—		—		9	0	17	0
Bragantino	2017	Série C	17	0	19	0	1	0	—		—		37	0
Bragantino	2018	Série C	19	1	13	0	2	0	—		—		34	1
Bragantino	Total		44	1	32	0	3	0	0	0	9	0	88	1
Água Santa (loan)	2017	Paulista A2	—		—		—		—		6	0	6	0
Vitória	2018	Série A	12	1	—		—		—		—		12	1
Coritiba (loan)	2019	Série B	8	0	12	0	1	0	—		—		21	0
Santa Cruz (loan)	2020	Série C	0	0	8	1	2	0	—		6 (Note: Appearance(s) in Copa do Nordeste)	0	16	1
Operário Ferroviário	2020	Série B	31	0	—		—		—		—		31	0
Operário Ferroviário	2021	Série B	25	1	10	0	2	0	—		—		37	1
Operário Ferroviário	2022	Série B	35	0	11	1	1	0	—		—		47	1
Operário Ferroviário	Total		91	1	21	1	3	0	—		—		115	2
Portuguesa	2023	Paulista	—		5	0	—		—		—		5	0
Career total			174	3	128	2	10	0	0	0	49	1	361	6
