= Ruy (footballer) =

Brazilian footballer

Personal information
- Full name: Ruy Franco de Almeida Júnior
- Date of birth: 26 January 1989 (age 37)
- Place of birth: Itapeva, Brazil
- Height: 1.71 m (5 ft 7 1/2 in)
- Position: Attacking midfielder

Team information
- Current team: Concórdia

Youth career
- 2006–2009: Coritiba

Senior career*
Years	Team	Apps	(Gls)
2010–2012	Coritiba	0	(0)
2010	→ Vilhena (loan)	3	(1)
2011–2012	→ Ribeirão (loan)	8	(0)
2012	→ Arapongas (loan)	5	(0)
2013–2014	Arapongas	21	(2)
2014	→ Maringá (loan)	5	(1)
2015	Operário Ferroviário	17	(5)
2015–2020	Coritiba	57	(7)
2017	→ América Mineiro (loan)	24	(6)
2018	→ América Mineiro (loan)	23	(1)
2019	→ Vitória (loan)	16	(0)
2020	Náutico	18	(1)
2021–2022	Paysandu	16	(2)
2022	→ Concórdia (loan)	12	(1)
2022	→ Ferroviário-CE (loan)	10	(1)
2023–	Concórdia	12	(0)
- * Club domestic league appearances and goals as of 18 June 2023

Ruy Franco de Almeida Júnior (born 26 January 1989), known simply as Ruy, is a Brazilian footballer who plays for Concórdia as an attacking midfielder.

== Club career ==
Born in Itapeva, São Paulo, Ruy graduated from Coritiba Foot Ball Club's youth setup. In 2010, he was promoted to the main squad, but made his debuts as a senior while on loan at Vilhena Esporte Clube.

Ruy was subsequently loaned to G.D. Ribeirão in Portugal and Arapongas Esporte Clube, signing permanently for the latter in 2013 after his contract expired. In June 2014 he was loaned to Maringá Futebol Clube, competing in Série D and returning to Arapongas in September.

On 16 December 2014, Ruy was presented at Operário Ferroviário Esporte Clube. An undisputed starter during his spell, he appeared in 17 matches and scored five goals in the 2015 Campeonato Paranaense as his team was crowned champions.

On 7 May 2015 Ruy returned to Coritiba, signing a three-year deal. Seven days later, already aged 26, he played his first match for the club, starting and scoring the first in a 2–1 home win against Fortaleza Esporte Clube for that year's Copa do Brasil.

Ruy made his Série A debut on 16 May, playing the full 90 minutes in a 2–0 home success over Grêmio Foot-Ball Porto Alegrense.

In April 2017 Ruy was loaned to América Mineiro for the 2017 Campeonato Brasileiro Série B season.

In January 2019, Ruy was loaned out to Vitória for the rest of the year.

== Honours ==
Operário Ferroviário

- Campeonato Paranaense: 2015

América Mineiro

- Campeonato Brasileiro Série B: 2017
