= Rafael Ribeiro (footballer) =

Brazilian footballer

Personal information
- Full name: Rafael Ribeiro Alves
- Date of birth: 18 January 1996 (age 30)
- Place of birth: Rio de Janeiro, Brazil
- Height: 1.90 m (6 ft 3 in)
- Position: Centre-back

Team information
- Current team: Isenmulang Kalteng
- Number: 33

Youth career
- 2012: Serra Macaense
- 2013: Comercial-SP
- 2014–2016: Náutico

Senior career*
Years	Team	Apps	(Gls)
2016–2022	Náutico	104	(7)
2021	→ Fluminense (loan)	1	(0)
2022	Vitória	3	(0)
2022–2023	Chapecoense	12	(0)
2023–2024	Figueirense	20	(1)
2025	Velo Clube	11	(0)
2025–2026	SC Delhi	10	(0)
2026–	Isenmulang Kalteng	1	(0)
- * Club domestic league appearances and goals as of 22:00, 19 September 2026 (UTC)

Rafael Ribeiro Alves (born 18 January 1996), known as Rafael Ribeiro, is a Brazilian footballer who plays as a defender for Super League club Isenmulang Kalteng.

== Career statistics ==
As of 27 April 2021

Club	Season	League			State League		Cup		Continental		Other		Total	
Club	Season	Division	Apps	Goals	Apps	Goals	Apps	Goals	Apps	Goals	Apps	Goals	Apps	Goals
Náutico	2016	Série B	0	0	0	0	0	0	—		—		0	0
Náutico	2017	Série B	6	0	1	0	0	0	—		0 (Note: Appearance(s) in Copa do Nordeste)	0	7	0
Náutico	2018	Série C	5	0	6	1	0	0	—		4	1	15	2
Náutico	2019	Série C	7	0	5	1	1	0	—		3	0	16	1
Náutico	2020	Série B	26	1	8	1	0	0	—		4	0	38	2
Náutico	Total		44	1	16	3	1	0	—		11	1	76	5
Fluminense (loan)	2021	Série A	0	0	1	0	0	0	0	0	—		1	0
Fluminense (loan)	Total		0	0	1	0	0	0	0	0	—		1	0
Career total			44	1	17	3	1	0	0	0	11	1	77	5

== Honours ==
Náutico

- Campeonato Pernambucano: 2018
- Campeonato Brasileiro Série C: 2019

== Notes and references ==
Notes
