= Danny Morais =

Brazilian footballer (born 1985)

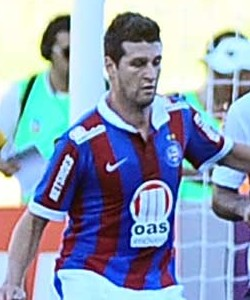

Personal information
- Full name: Danny Bittencourt Morais
- Date of birth: June 29, 1985 (age 41)
- Place of birth: Porto Alegre, Brazil
- Height: 1.87 m (6 ft 1 1/2 in)
- Position: Central defender

Youth career
- 2000–2005: Internacional

Senior career*
| Years | Team | Apps | (Gls) |
| 2006–2011 | Internacional | 51 | (2) |
| 2010 | → Botafogo (loan) | 24 | (2) |
| 2011–2013 | Bahia | 65 | (1) |
| 2013–2014 | Ettifaq FC | 23 | (1) |
| 2014 | Chapecoense | 1 | (0) |
| 2015–2017 | Santa Cruz | 102 | (2) |
| 2017 | Busan IPark | 26 | (1) |
| 2018–2021 | Santa Cruz | 76 | (2) |
- * Club domestic league appearances and goals as of 1 August 2018

Danny Bittencourt Morais (born June 29, 1985) is a former Brazilian footballer who played last for Santa Cruz.

== Career ==
Morais has been an able replacement for injured Uruguayan central defender Gonzalo Sorondo who is currently out for six months from November 2007, with a knee injury. On 13 February 2010 Botafogo de Futebol e Regatas announce the signing of the center back, the player arrives on loan until the end of December from Internacional. They continue also to track the player of Palmeiras Sandro Silva.

== Honours ==
Internacional

- Campeonato Gaúcho: 2008, 2009
- Dubai Cup: 2008
- Copa Sudamericana: 2008
- Suruga Bank Championship: 2009

Botafogo

- Campeonato Carioca: 2010

Bahia

- Campeonato Baiano: 2012

Santa Cruz

- Campeonato Pernambucano: 2015, 2016
- Copa do Nordeste: 2016
