= Victor Rangel (Brazilian footballer) =

Brazilian footballer (born 1990)

Personal information
- Full name: Victor Neves Rangel
- Date of birth: 8 September 1990 (age 36)
- Place of birth: Serra, Brazil
- Height: 1.82 m (5 ft 11 1/2 in)
- Position: Forward

Team information
- Current team: Porto Vitória

Youth career
- 2010: Desportiva

Senior career*
Years	Team	Apps	(Gls)
2011	Aracruz	5	(3)
2011	Espírito Santo	7	(5)
2012	Vitória-ES	15	(11)
2012	Marcílio Dias	0	(0)
2013	Madureira	0	(0)
2013–2014	Cachoeiro	13	(7)
2014	→ Desportiva (loan)	10	(4)
2015–2017	Guarani de Palhoça	15	(11)
2015	→ Grêmio (loan)	6	(0)
2016	→ América Mineiro (loan)	13	(2)
2016	→ Bahia (loan)	18	(1)
2017	→ Ceará (loan)	0	(0)
2017–2018	Cafetaleros de Tapachula	17	(6)
2018	Ponte Preta	13	(0)
2019	CRB	21	(6)
2019	Botafogo	14	(0)
2020–2021	Santa Cruz	21	(2)
2021	Ituano	15	(0)
2021	Brasiliense	10	(0)
2022	Joinville	11	(3)
2022	Ferroviária	9	(1)
2023	CRAC	13	(0)
2024	Desportiva Ferroviária	12	(6)
2024–2025	Nova Iguaçu	17	(5)
2026	Porto Vitória	0	(0)
- * Club domestic league appearances and goals as of 21:18, 7 February 2023 (UTC)

Victor Neves Rangel (born 8 September 1990) is a Brazilian footballer who plays as a forward for Porto Vitória.

== Club career ==
Born in Serra, Espírito Santo, Rangel made his senior debut with Aracruz in 2011, after a failed trial at Botafogo. After mainly representing clubs in his native state, he moved to Guarani de Palhoça in 2015; he was the tournament's top scorer with 11 goals, despite suffering relegation.

On 19 May 2015 Rangel joined Série A side Grêmio, on loan until the end of the year. He made his debut in the category on 4 June, coming on as a second-half substitute for Pedro Rocha in a 3–1 home win against Corinthians.

Rangel appeared rarely for Tricolor during the campaign, contributing with only 88 minutes of action. On 12 February 2016 he signed for fellow league team América-MG, on loan until the end of the year.

== Honours ==
América Mineiro

- Campeonato Mineiro: 2016

Porto Vitória

- Campeonato Capixaba: 2026
