= William Alves (footballer, born 1987) =

Brazilian footballer (born 1987)

Personal information
- Full name: William Augusto Alves Conserva
- Date of birth: 29 April 1987 (age 39)
- Place of birth: Marília, Brazil
- Height: 1.88 m (6 ft 2 in)
- Position: Centre back

Team information
- Current team: Santa Cruz
- Number: 4

Youth career
- 2005–2007: Joinville

Senior career*
Years	Team	Apps	(Gls)
2007–2008	Joinville		
2007	→ Garibaldi (loan)		
2008	→ Esportivo (loan)		
2008	Corinthians	2	(0)
2009	Mogi Mirim	5	(0)
2009	Juventude	2	(0)
2009–2010	Rio Claro	11	(1)
2010	South China	9	(0)
2011	Rio Branco	11	(0)
2011	Feirense	1	(0)
2012–2013	Santa Cruz	44	(6)
2013–2014	Náutico	59	(3)
2015	Paysandu	16	(1)
2015–2016	Vitória Setúbal	33	(0)
2016–2017	Al-Batin	20	(1)
2017–2018	Atlético Goianiense	43	(2)
2019	Mirassol	8	(0)
2019–2022	Santa Cruz	57	(6)
2022–2024	Concórdia	63	(3)
2022	→ Botafogo-PB (loan)	4	(0)
2025–	Santa Cruz	49	(2)
- * Club domestic league appearances and goals as of 9 November 2026

William Augusto Alves Conserva (born 29 April 1987), known as William Alves, is a Brazilian footballer who plays as a central defender for Santa Cruz.

== Career ==
William Alves played for South China of Hong Kong in the Hong Kong First Division League. Steven Lo thought he is young and speedy and will help to shore up South China's defence. However, in December 2010, Steven Lo said that Alves' contract would be terminated.
