= Didira (footballer) =

Brazilian footballer (born 1988)

Personal information
- Full name: Cícero dos Santos Bezerra
- Date of birth: 9 June 1988 (age 38)
- Place of birth: Arapiraca, Brazil
- Height: 1.71 m (5 ft 7 in)
- Position: Attacking midfielder

Team information
- Current team: Sport Club Penedense

Youth career
- ASA

Senior career*
| Years | Team | Apps | (Gls) |
| 2006–2015 | ASA | 194 | (39) |
| 2007 | → Universal (loan) | ? | (1) |
| 2011 | → Atlético Mineiro (loan) | 2 | (0) |
| 2016 | CSA | 26 | (0) |
| 2016 | ABC | 1 | (0) |
| 2016–2020 | CSA | 146 | (25) |
| 2020–2021 | Santa Cruz | 45 | (6) |
| 2021 | Brasiliense | 26 | (3) |
| 2021–2022 | CSA | 23 | (3) |
| 2022 | → ASA (loan) | 6 | (0) |
| 2023 | Atlético Catarinense | 5 | (0) |
| 2023– | ASA | 20 | (1) |
- * Club domestic league appearances and goals as of 6 August 2023

Cícero dos Santos Bezerra (born 9 June 1988), better known as Didira, is a Brazilian professional footballer who plays as an attacking midfielder for ASA.

== Club career ==
=== ASA ===
Born in Arapiraca, Alagoas, Didira represented hometown side ASA as a youth, playing as a right back. He made his first team debut in 2006, but was sparingly used and was subsequently loaned to lowly Universal FC in the following year.

Back to ASA, Didira was converted into an attacking midfielder and became a regular starter, achieving promotion to the Série B in 2009. On 17 July 2010, he scored a brace in a 6–1 home routing of Brasiliense.

On 23 September 2011, Didira joined Série A club Atlético Mineiro on loan until the end of the year. He made his top tier debut on 2 October, replacing Triguinho in a 1–1 home draw against Ceará, and played in only one further match before terminating his contract with the club on 27 December.

Didira remained at ASA until 2015, and announced he agreed to a contract with a Chinese club in October.

=== CSA ===
On 28 November 2015, Didira was presented at CSA. The following 1 June, he moved to ABC, but left the club in the following month and returned to CSA.

Upon returning, Didira was an undisputed starter for the club, achieving four consecutive promotions (from Série D to Série A). On 7 December 2018, after previously announcing that he would leave the club, he agreed to a new one-year deal.

== Honours ==
ASA

- Campeonato Alagoano: 2009, 2011

CSA

- Campeonato Brasileiro Série C: 2017
- Campeonato Alagoano: 2018, 2019
