= Toty (Brazilian footballer) =

Brazilian footballer

Personal information
- Full name: Christofoly Acioly da Silva
- Date of birth: 2 April 1991 (age 35)
- Place of birth: Recife, Brazil
- Height: 1.65 m (5 ft 5 in)
- Positions: Right-back; right wing back

Team information
- Current team: Santa Cruz

Youth career
- 2006–2011: Sport Recife

Senior career*
Years	Team	Apps	(Gls)
2011	Sport Recife	0	(0)
2011	→ Belo Jardim (loan)	20	(1)
2012	Cabense	2	(0)
2013	Sousa	20	(0)
2013	Limoeirense	1	(0)
2013	ABC	6	(0)
2014	Paraná	9	(0)
2014	Jacuipense	12	(1)
2015	Botafogo-PB	8	(0)
2015	Coruripe	15	(0)
2015–2017	Salgueiro	76	(4)
2018	Brasil de Pelotas	21	(0)
2019	Cuiabá	26	(1)
2020	Santa Cruz	41	(5)
2021–2023	Brusque	107	(0)
2024	Santa Cruz	12	(0)
2024	Retrô	20	(0)
2025–	Santa Cruz	26	(0)
- * Club domestic league appearances and goals as of 14 October 2025

Christofoly Acioly da Silva (born 2 April 1991), better known as Toty, is a Brazilian professional footballer who plays as a right back and right wingback for Santa Cruz.

== Career ==
Right back and right wingback, Toty stands out for his ability to support the attack. He was revealed by Sport Recife and played for several clubs in the northeast region of Brazil. In 2019, in Cuiabá, he was part of the winning squads of the Copa Verde and state league. Since 2021 he has been at Brusque FC. Signed with Santa Cruz for 2024 season. In April 2024, Toty signed with Retrô.

== Honours ==
Cuiabá

- Copa Verde: 2019
- Campeonato Matogrossense: 2019

Brusque

- Campeonato Catarinense: 2022
- Recopa Catarinense: 2023

Retrô

- Campeonato Brasileiro Série D: 2024
