= André (footballer, born 2000) =

Brazilian footballer

Personal information
- Full name: André da Silva Lima
- Date of birth: 7 April 2000 (age 26)
- Place of birth: São Paulo, Brazil
- Height: 1.79 m (5 ft 10 in)
- Position: Defensive midfielder

Team information
- Current team: Ponte Preta
- Number: 8

Youth career
- 2013–2020: Guarulhos
- 2014–2015: → Diadema (loan)
- 2016: → União Mogi (loan)
- 2018: → Internacional (loan)
- 2019–2020: → Santa Cruz (loan)

Senior career*
Years	Team	Apps	(Gls)
2020–2023	Guarulhos	0	(0)
2020–2021	→ Santa Cruz (loan)	27	(0)
2021	→ Atlético Goianiense (loan)	11	(0)
2022	→ Operário Ferroviário (loan)	25	(0)
2022–2023	→ Mirassol (loan)	2	(0)
2023	→ Ferroviária (loan)	2	(0)
2024–2025	Confiança	25	(6)
2025	Paysandu	26	(2)
2026–	Ponte Preta	21	(0)
- * Club domestic league appearances and goals as of 18 November 2026

André da Silva Lima (born 7 April 2000), simply known as André, is a Brazilian footballer who plays as a defensive midfielder for Ponte Preta.

== Club career ==
Born in São Paulo, André started his career at Guarulhos' youth setup, before serving loans at Diadema, União Mogi, Internacional and Santa Cruz. He was promoted to the first team of the latter in 2020, and made his senior debut on 13 February of that year by coming on as a half-time substitute in a 1–0 home win against ABC, for the season's Copa do Nordeste.

On 18 April 2020, André renewed his loan deal until December 2021. He became an undisputed starter during the 2020 Série C, but had his loan terminated on 26 February 2021 due to interest from clubs in higher divisions; Santa Cruz retained 30% over a future sale.

On 6 March 2021, André agreed to a loan deal with Série A side Atlético Goianiense.

== Career statistics ==
As of 6 February 2022

Club	Season	League			State League		Cup		Conmebol		Other		Total	
Club	Season	Division	Apps	Goals	Apps	Goals	Apps	Goals	Apps	Goals	Apps	Goals	Apps	Goals
Santa Cruz	2020	Série C	19	0	8	0	1	0	—		7 (Note: Appearance(s) in Copa do Nordeste)	0	35	0
Atlético Goianiense	2021	Série A	4	0	7	0	1	0	0	0	—		12	0
Operário Ferroviário	2022	Série B	14	0	11	0	0	0	—		—		25	0
Mirassol	2022	Série C	2	0	—		—		—		—		2	0
Career total			39	0	26	0	2	0	0	0	7	0	74	0

== Honours ==
Atlético Goianiense

- Campeonato Goiano: 2021
