= 2021 Clube Náutico Capibaribe season =

Náutico
2021 season
- Chairman: Edno Melo
- Manager: Hélio dos Anjos; Marcelo Chamusca
- Stadium: Estádio dos Aflitos
- Série B: 8th
- Pernambucano: Champions (23rd title)
- Top goalscorer: League: Jean Carlos (11); All: Jean Carlos and Vinícius (13)
Home colours	Away colours	Third colours

The 2021 season was Náutico's 121st season in the club's history. Náutico competed in the Campeonato Pernambucano and Série B.

== Final squad ==
Note: Flags indicate national team as defined under FIFA eligibility rules; some limited exceptions apply. Players may hold more than one non-FIFA nationality.

No.	Pos.	Nation	Player
1	GK	BRA	Alex Alves
2	DF	BRA	Hereda
4	DF	BRA	Camutanga
5	MF	BRA	Marciel
6	DF	BRA	Rafinha
7	FW	BRA	Vinícius
8	DF	BRA	Júnior Tavares
9	FW	BRA	Kieza
10	MF	BRA	Jean Carlos
11	FW	BRA	Matheus Carvalho
12	GK	BRA	Anderson
13	DF	BRA	Thassio
16	FW	ECU	Jacob Murillo
17	MF	BRA	Vinícius Vargas
18	MF	BRA	Guilherme Nunes
19	FW	PAR	Guillermo Paiva
20	MF	BRA	Lucas Paraíba
21	DF	BRA	Breno
22	MF	BRA	Matheus Jesus
25	DF	BRA	Dênis

No.	Pos.	Nation	Player
26	GK	BRA	Renan
29	MF	BRA	Djavan
30	DF	BRA	Rafael Ribeiro
31	DF	BRA	Bryan
32	GK	BRA	Jefferson
39	MF	BRA	Matheus Trindade
48	DF	BRA	Carlão
50	MF	BRA	Jailson
66	DF	BRA	Yago
70	FW	BRA	Tailson
71	MF	BRA	Juninho Carpina
77	FW	BRA	Álvaro
79	MF	BRA	Giovanny
93	FW	BRA	Iago Dias
94	GK	BRA	Bruno
96	DF	BRA	Jeferson Carvalho
97	MF	BRA	Luiz Henrique
98	MF	BRA	Rhaldney
99	FW	BRA	Caio Dantas

== Statistics ==
=== Overall ===
Games played	50 (12 Pernambucano, 38 Série B)
Games won	22 (8 Pernambucano, 14 Série B)
Games drawn	14 (3 Pernambucano, 11 Série B)
Games lost	14 (1 Pernambucano, 13 Série B)
Goals scored	78
Goals conceded	64
Goal difference	+14
Best results (goal difference)	5–0 (H) v Central - Pernambucano - 2021.02.27; 5–0 (H) v Operário - Série B - 2021.07.02
Worst result (goal difference)	0–4 (H) v Confiança - Série B - 2021.08.07
Top scorer	Jean Carlos and Vinícius (13)

Source: Náutico official website

=== Goalscorers ===
Place	Position	Nationality	Number	Name	Campeonato Pernambucano	Série B	Total
1	MF	(Brazil)	10	Jean Carlos	2	11	13
1	MF	(Brazil)	17	Vinícius	5	8	13
2	FW	(Brazil)	9	Kieza	10	2	12
3	FW	(Brazil)	7	Erick	5	2	7
4	MF	(Brazil)	98	Caio Dantas	0	5	5
5	FW	(Paraguay)	19	Guillermo Paiva	0	4	4
6	DF	(Brazil)	31	Bryan	2	1	3
6	DF	(Brazil)	4	Camutanga	0	3	3
7	FW	(Brazil)	77	Álvaro Oliveira	0	2	2
7	MF	(Brazil)	5	Marciel	0	2	2
7	DF	(Brazil)	30	Rafael Ribeiro	0	2	2
7	MF	(Brazil)	98	Rhaldney	1	1	2
7	DF	(Brazil)	4	Wagner Leonardo	2	0	2
8	MF	(Brazil)	79	Giovanny	1	0	1
8	FW	(Brazil)	93	Iago Dias	0	1	1
8	Fw	(Ecuador)	16	Jacob Murillo	0	1	1
8	DF	(Brazil)	8	Júnior Tavares	0	1	1
8	FW	(Brazil)	11	Matheus Carvalho	0	1	1
8	MF	(Brazil)	22	Matheus Jesus	0	1	1
8	DF	(Brazil)	66	Yago	0	1	1
				Own goals	0	1	1
				Total	28	50	78

=== Managers performance ===
Name	Nationality	From	To	P	W	D	L	GF	GA	Avg%	Ref
Hélio dos Anjos	Brazil	27 February 2021	25 November 2021	40	20	11	9	67	51	59%	
Guilherme dos Anjos (c)	Brazil	11 April 2021	28 October 2021	3	1	1	1	6	4	44%	
Marcelo Chamusca	Brazil	24 August 2021	21 September 2021	6	1	2	3	5	8	27%	
Marcelo Rocha (c)	Brazil	24 September 2021		1	0	0	1	0	1	0%	

(c) Indicates the caretaker manager

== Official Competitions ==
=== Campeonato Pernambucano ===
27 February 2021 1	Náutico	5–0	Central	Recife
16:00 (UTC-3)	Kieza 3' (pen.), 22', 24', 35'; Erick 17'	Report		Stadium: Estádio Eládio de Barros Carvalho (Aflitos); Referee: Rodrigo Pereira

7 March 2021 2	Sete de Setembro	0–1	Náutico	Caruaru
15:00 (UTC-3)		Report	Kieza 32'	Stadium: Estádio Luiz José de Lacerda (Lacerdão); Referee: Deborah Cecilia Correia

21 March 2021 3	Náutico	3–1	Vera Cruz	Recife
16:00 (UTC-3)	Erick 45+2'; Giovanny 86'; Bryan 89'	Report	Everton Bala 66'	Stadium: Estádio Eládio de Barros Carvalho (Aflitos); Referee: Michelangelo Almeida

27 March 2021 4	Náutico	4–1	Vitória das Tabocas	Recife
19:00 (UTC-3)	Vinícius 17', 45+1'; Jean Carlos 28'; Erick 30'	Report	Danilo Quipapá 65'	Stadium: Estádio Eládio de Barros Carvalho (Aflitos); Referee: José Woshington da Silva

7 April 2021 5	Salgueiro	2–3	Náutico	Salgueiro
21:30 (UTC-3)	Tarcísio 69'; Felipe Baiano 74'	Report	Erick 25', 28'; Kieza 78' (pen.)	Stadium: Estádio Cornélio de Barros; Referee: Gilberto Castro Júnior

11 April 2021 6	Retrô	1–4	Náutico	São Lourenço da Mata
16:00 (UTC-3)	Gelson 52'	Report	Kieza 4'; Jean Carlos 13'; Vinícius 39'; Bryan 88'	Stadium: Estádio Governador Carlos Wilson Campos (Arena Pernambuco); Referee: Deborah Cecília

18 April 2021 7	Náutico	2–1	Santa Cruz	Recife
16:00 (UTC-3)	Rhaldney 2'; Vinícius 27'	Report	Léo Gaúcho 52'	Stadium: Estádio Eládio de Barros Carvalho (Aflitos); Referee: Diego Fernando Silva de Lima

26 April 2021 8	Náutico	2–2	Afogados da Ingazeira	Recife
20:00 (UTC-3)	Vinícius 8'; Wagner Leonardo 19'	Report	Jordan 15'; Gabriel 36'	Stadium: Estádio Eládio de Barros Carvalho (Aflitos); Referee: José Woshington da Silva

2 May 2021 9	Sport	3–0	Náutico	Recife
16:00 (UTC-3)	Neilton 4'; Ronaldo Alves 45' (o.g.); Adryelson 54'	Report		Stadium: Estádio Adelmar da Costa Carvalho (Ilha do Retiro); Referee: Rodrigo Pereira

==== Semi-final ====
9 May 2021	Náutico	2–1	Santa Cruz	São Lourenço da Mata
16:00 (UTC-3)	Kieza 19', 53' (pen.)	Report	Guillermo Paiva 89' (o.g.)	Stadium: Estádio Governador Carlos Wilson Campos (Arena Pernambuco); Referee: Rafael Traci

==== Finals ====
16 May 2021 First leg	Sport	1–1	Náutico	São Lourenço da Mata
16:00 (UTC-3)	Everaldo 45+1'	Report	Wagner Leonardo 51'	Stadium: Estádio Governador Carlos Wilson Campos (Arena Pernambuco); Referee: Wagner do Nascimento Magalhães

23 May 2021 Second leg	Náutico	1–1 (5–3 p)	Sport	Recife
16:00 (UTC-3)	Kieza 78'	Report	Mikael 87'	Stadium: Estádio Eládio de Barros Carvalho (Aflitos); Referee: Rodolpho Toski Marques
	Penalties
	Jean Carlos (penalty scored); Vinícius (penalty scored); Hereda (penalty scored); Giovanny (penalty scored); Kieza (penalty scored)		(penalty scored) Iago Maidana; (penalty scored) Mikael; (penalty scored) Tréllez; (penalty missed) Marquinhos

==== Record ====
Final Position	Points	Matches	Wins	Draws	Losses	Goals For	Goals Away	Avg%
1st	27	12	8	3	1	28	14	75%

=== Série B ===
==== Table ====
Pos	Team	Pld	W	D	L	GF	GA	GD	Pts
6	Guarani	38	16	12	10	54	41	+13	60
7	CRB	38	16	12	10	47	39	+8	60
8	Náutico	38	14	11	13	50	50	0	53
9	Vila Nova	38	12	15	11	35	36	−1	51
10	Vasco da Gama	38	13	10	15	43	52	−9	49

Source: CBF
Rules for classification: 1) points; 2) wins; 3) goal difference; 4) goals scored; 5) head-to-head results (only between 2 teams); 6) fewest red cards; 7) fewest yellow cards; 8) drawing of lots.

==== First stage ====
28 May 2021 1	Náutico	1–0	CSA	Recife
21:30 (UTC-3)	Jean Carlos 26'	Report		Stadium: Estádio Eládio de Barros Carvalho (Aflitos); Attendance: 193; Referee: Emerson Ricardo de Almeida Andrade

7 June 2021 2	Vitória	0–1	Náutico	Salvador
20:00 (UTC-3)		Report	Jean Carlos 46'	Stadium: Estádio Manoel Barradas (Barradão); Attendance: 0 Referee: Leonardo Sígari Zanon

11 June 2021 3	Guarani	1–3	Náutico	Campinas
21:30 (UTC-3)	Régis 55'	Report	Vinícius 49'; Kieza 60'; Erick 64'	Stadium: Estádio Brinco de Ouro da Princesa; Attendance: 0 Referee: Jonathan Antero Silva

15 June 2021 4	Náutico	2–0	Vila Nova	Recife
19:00 (UTC-3)	Vinícius 38'; Bryan 89'	Report		Stadium: Estádio Eládio de Barros Carvalho (Aflitos); Attendance: 140; Referee: Rafael Carlos Salgueiro Lima

20 June 2021 5	Náutico	3–1	Botafogo	Recife
16:00 (UTC-3)	Rafael Navarro 15' (o.g.); Jean Carlos 90'; Guillermo Paiva 90+5'	Report	Felipe Ferreira 74'	Stadium: Estádio Eládio de Barros Carvalho (Aflitos); Attendance: 208; Referee: Wanderson Alves de Sousa

23 June 2021 6	Londrina	0–0	Náutico	Londrina
16:00 (UTC-3)		Report		Stadium: Estádio Jacy Scaff (do Café); Attendance: 0 Referee: Rodrigo da Fonseca Silva

26 June 2021 7	Náutico	1–1	Remo	Recife
21:00 (UTC-3)	Guillermo Paiva 88'	Report	Felipe Gedoz 26'	Stadium: Estádio Eládio de Barros Carvalho (Aflitos); Attendance: 185; Referee: André Luiz de Freitas Castro

29 June 2021 8	CRB	1–1	Náutico	Maceió
21:30 (UTC-3)	Caetano 90'	Report	Erick 59'	Stadium: Estádio Rei Pelé; Attendance: 0 Referee: Zandick Gondim Alves Junior

2 July 2021 9	Náutico	5–0	Operário	Recife
19:00 (UTC-3)	Marciel 9'; Guillermo Paiva 29', 55'; Jean Carlos 50'; Iago Dias 90'	Report		Stadium: Estádio Eládio de Barros Carvalho (Aflitos); Attendance: 203; Referee: Fábio Augusto Santos Sá Junior

9 July 2021 10	Goiás	0–1	Náutico	Goiânia
21:30 (UTC-3)		Report	Jean Carlos 75'	Stadium: Estádio Hailé Pinheiro (Serrinha); Attendance: 0 Referee: Ivan da Silva Guimarães Junior

12 July 2021 11	Náutico	1–1	Ponte Preta	Recife
20:00 (UTC-3)	Camutanga 50'	Report	Moisés 19'	Stadium: Estádio Eládio de Barros Carvalho (Aflitos); Attendance: 192; Referee: Jonathan Antero Silva

18 July 2021 12	Vasco da Gama	1–1	Náutico	Rio de Janeiro
16:00 (UTC-3)	Morato 90+2'	Report	Vinícius 32'	Stadium: Estádio Vasco da Gama (São Januário); Attendance: 0 Referee: Ramon Abatti Abel

21 July 2021 13	Náutico	2–1	Brasil de Pelotas	Recife
21:30 (UTC-3)	Jean Carlos 9', 31'	Report	Ramon 1'	Stadium: Estádio Eládio de Barros Carvalho (Aflitos); Attendance: 155; Referee: Salim Fende Chavez

24 July 2021 14	Náutico	1–1	Brusque	Recife
19:30 (UTC-3)	Kieza 16'	Report	Éverton Alemão 65'	Stadium: Estádio Eládio de Barros Carvalho (Aflitos); Attendance: 166; Referee: Jean Pierre Goncalves Lima

30 July 2021 15	Coritiba	3–1	Náutico	Curitiba
20:00 (UTC-3)	Igor Paixão 32'; Waguininho 39'; 80'	Report	Matheus Carvalho 68'	Stadium: Estádio Major Antônio (Couto Pereira); Attendance: 0 Referee: Thiago Luis Scarascati

7 August 2021 16	Náutico	0–4	Confiança	Recife
16:30 (UTC-3)		Report	Willians Santana 5'; Rafael Vila 45+3', 60'; Nirley 48'	Stadium: Estádio Eládio de Barros Carvalho (Aflitos); Attendance: 175; Referee: Rafael Carlos Salgueiro Lima

11 August 2021 17	Sampaio Corrêa	2–0	Náutico	São Luís
21:30 (UTC-3)	Daniel Costa 73'; Pimentinha 80'	Report		Stadium: Estádio Governador João Castelo (Castelão); Attendance: 0 Referee: Felipe da Silva Gonçalves Paludo

14 August 2021 18	Avaí	2–0	Náutico	Florianópolis
19:00 (UTC-3)	Yago 55' (o.g.); João Lucas 90+1'	Report		Stadium: Estádio Aderbal Ramos da Silva (Ressacada); Attendance: 76; Referee: Dyorgines Jose Padovani de Andrade

17 August 2021 19	Náutico	0–1	Cruzeiro	Recife
19:00 (UTC-3)		Report	Igor Thiago 82'	Stadium: Estádio Eládio de Barros Carvalho (Aflitos); Attendance: 212; Referee: Marcelo de Lima Henrique

24 August 2021 20	CSA	0–1	Náutico	Maceió
21:30 (UTC-3)		Report	Vinícius 71'	Stadium: Estádio Rei Pelé; Attendance: 0 Referee: Savio Pereira Sampaio

29 August 2021 21	Náutico	1–1	Vitória	Recife
16:00 (UTC-3)	Vinícius 51'	Report	Bruno Oliveira 65'	Stadium: Estádio Eládio de Barros Carvalho (Aflitos); Attendance: 202; Referee: José Mendonça da Silva Junior

4 September 2021 22	Náutico	1–1	Guarani	Recife
17:15 (UTC-3)	Jean Carlos 45+1'	Report	Bruno Sávio 54'	Stadium: Estádio Eládio de Barros Carvalho (Aflitos); Attendance: 203; Referee: Rafael Traci

10 September 2021 23	Vila Nova	1–0	Náutico	Goiânia
21:30 (UTC-3)	Clayton 45+1'	Report		Stadium: Estádio Onésio Brasileiro Alvarenga; Attendance: 0 Referee: Rodrigo Batista Raposo

18 September 2021 24	Botafogo	3–1	Náutico	Rio de Janeiro
16:30 (UTC-3)	Luís Oyama 40'; Rafael Navarro 50', 90+6'	Report	Jean Carlos 8'	Stadium: Estádio Olímpico Nilton Santos (Engenhão); Attendance: 0 Referee: Flavio Rodrigues de Souza

21 September 2021 25	Náutico	1–2	Londrina	Recife
21:30 (UTC-3)	Jean Carlos 62'	Report	Luiz Henrique 19', 50'	Stadium: Estádio Eládio de Barros Carvalho (Aflitos); Attendance: 196; Referee: Alisson Sidnei Furtado

24 September 2021 26	Remo	1–0	Náutico	Belém
19:00 (UTC-3)	Jefferson 90+7'	Report		Stadium: Estádio Evandro Almeida (Baenão); Attendance: 1,699; Referee: Leo Simão Holanda

28 September 2021 27	Náutico	1–3	CRB	Recife
19:00 (UTC-3)	Álvaro Oliveira 57'	Report	Pablo Dyego 16', 26'; Yago 66' (o.g.)	Stadium: Estádio Eládio de Barros Carvalho (Aflitos); Attendance: 649; Referee: Dewson Fernando Freitas da Silva

1 October 2021 28	Operário	1–2	Náutico	Ponta Grossa
21:30 (UTC-3)	Djalma 25'	Report	Vinícius 84'; Caio Dantas 85'	Stadium: Estádio Germano Krüger; Attendance: 427; Referee: Edina Alves Batista

5 October 2021 29	Náutico	3–2	Goiás	Recife
21:30 (UTC-3)	Caio Dantas 23'; Matheus Jesus 28'; Camutanga 73'	Report	Alef Manga 8'; Dadá Belmonte 86'	Stadium: Estádio Eládio de Barros Carvalho (Aflitos); Attendance: 2,724; Referee: Ricardo Marques Ribeiro

16 October 2021 30	Ponte Preta	2–3	Náutico	Campinas
16:00 (UTC-3)	Marcos Júnior 32'; Rodrigão 45+1'	Report	Caio Dantas 39'; Jacob 50'; Rafael Ribeiro 65'	Stadium: Estádio Moisés Lucarelli; Attendance: 2,732; Referee: Jefferson Ferreira de Moraes

24 October 2021 31	Náutico	2–2	Vasco da Gama	Recife
16:00 (UTC-3)	Vinícius 26'; Yago 58'	Report	Nenê 8'; Cano 18'	Stadium: Estádio Eládio de Barros Carvalho (Aflitos); Attendance: 3,080; Referee: Paulo Roberto Alves Junior

28 October 2021 32	Brasil de Pelotas	3–2	Náutico	Pelotas
21:30 (UTC-3)	Renatinho 5', 60'; Leandro Camilo 90+2'	Report	Vinícius 72'; Júnior Tavares 86'	Stadium: Estádio Bento Mendes de Freitas; Attendance: 484; Referee: Edina Alves Batista

2 November 2021 33	Brusque	4–3	Náutico	Brusque
19:00 (UTC-3)	Toni 14'; Luizão 31'; Maurício Garcez 39'; Jhon Cley 71'	Report	Caio Dantas 5'; Rafael Ribeiro 28'; Jean Carlos 53'	Stadium: Estádio Augusto Bauer; Attendance: 998; Referee: Felipe Fernandes de Lima

6 November 2021 34	Náutico	2–1	Coritiba	Recife
16:15 (UTC-3)	Caio Dantas 16'; Rhaldney 53'	Report	Luciano Castán 90+5'	Stadium: Estádio Eládio de Barros Carvalho (Aflitos); Attendance: 2,273; Referee: Flavio Rodrigues de Souza

9 November 2021 35	Confiança	0–0	Náutico	Aracaju
19:00 (UTC-3)		Report		Stadium: Estádio Lourival Baptista (Batistão); Attendance: 3,862; Referee: Thiago Luis Scarascati

15 November 2021 36	Náutico	2–1	Sampaio Corrêa	Recife
18:00 (UTC-3)	Camutanga 68'; Álvaro Oliveira 75'	Report	Gabriel 86'	Stadium: Estádio Eládio de Barros Carvalho (Aflitos); Attendance: 2,002; Referee: Ivan da Silva Guimarães Junior

21 November 2021 37	Náutico	1–2	Avaí	Recife
19:00 (UTC-3)	Marciel 89'	Report	Getúlio 10'; Renato 84'	Stadium: Estádio Eládio de Barros Carvalho (Aflitos); Attendance: 2,462; Referee: Wagner do Nascimento Magalhães

25 November 2021 38	Cruzeiro	0–0	Náutico	Belo Horizonte
20:00 (UTC-3)		Report		Stadium: Estádio Governador Magalhães Pinto (Mineirão); Attendance: 60,700; Referee: Paulo Renato Moreira da Silva Coelho

==== Record ====
Final Position	Points	Matches	Wins	Draws	Losses	Goals For	Goals Away	Avg%
8th	53	38	14	11	13	50	50	46%
