= 2022 Campeonato Pernambucano =

Football competition

Campeonato Pernambucano
- Season: 2022
- Dates: 22 January – 30 April
- Champions: Náutico (24th title)
- Relegated: Sete de Setembro; Vera Cruz
- 2023 Copa do Brasil: Náutico; Retrô; Santa Cruz; Sport (via Copa do Nordeste)
- 2023 Copa do Nordeste: Náutico; Sport (via RNC)
- 2023 Copa do Nordeste qualification: Retrô; Santa Cruz (via RNC)
- 2023 Série D: Retrô; Santa Cruz
- Matches played: 57
- Goals scored: 167 (2.93 per match)
- Top goalscorer: Renato Henrique (7 goals)
- Total attendance: 74,069 (1,299 per match)

The 2022 Campeonato Pernambucano (officially the Pernambucano Betsson 2022 for sponsorship reasons) was the 108th edition of the state championship of Pernambuco organized by FPF. The championship began on 22 January and ended on 30 April 2022.

In the first stage, Sete de Setembro had three points deducted for fielding the ineligible player Bililiu in the match Sete de Setembro v Náutico played on 1 February 2022 (2nd round).

The finals were contested in two-legged home-and-away format between the defending champions Náutico and Retrô. Tied 1–1 on aggregate, Náutico won 4–2 on penalties, winning the tournament for the 24th time. As champions, Náutico qualified for 2023 Copa do Brasil and 2023 Copa do Nordeste. The runners-up, Retrô qualified for 2023 Copa do Brasil and 2023 Copa do Nordeste qualification, while Santa Cruz, the best placed team in the first stage not already qualified, gained the third berth for 2023 Copa do Brasil.

== Teams ==
Ten teams were competing, eight returning from the 2021 and two promoted from the 2021 Pernambucano A2 Championship: Caruaru City and Íbis.

Club	City	Manager	Stadium	Coordinates	Capacity
Afogados	Afogados da Ingazeira	Sérgio China	Valdemar Viana de Araújo	7.7587°S 37.6339°W	1,735
Caruaru City	Caruaru	Thyago Marcolino	Antônio Inácio de Souza^{[a]}	8.2905°S 35.9807°W	6,000
Íbis	Paulista	Paulo Lima	Arena Pernambuco (São Lourenço da Mata)^{[b]}	8.0407°S 35.0104°W	44,300
Náutico	Recife	Roberto Fernandes	Aflitos	8.0406°S 34.8990°W	22,856
Retrô	Camaragibe	Dico Woolley	Arena Pernambuco (São Lourenço da Mata)	8.0407°S 35.0104°W	44,300
Salgueiro	Salgueiro	Sílvio Criciúma	Cornélio de Barros	8.0760°S 39.1216°W	12,070
Santa Cruz	Recife	Leston Júnior	Arruda^{[c]}	8.0267°S 34.8933°W	60,044
Sete de Setembro	Garanhuns	Roberto Neves	Lacerdão (Caruaru)^{[d]}	8.2786°S 35.9730°W	6,356
Sport	Recife	Gilmar Dal Pozzo	Ilha do Retiro	8.0630°S 34.9051°W	32,983
Vera Cruz	Vitória de Santo Antão	Doriva	Arena Pernambuco (São Lourenço da Mata)^{[e]}	8.0407°S 35.0104°W	44,300

^{a} Caruaru City played their home match against Vera Cruz at Lacerdão.
^{b} Íbis played their home matches at Arena Pernambuco instead of their regular stadium Ademir Cunha, Paulista. In the First stage, they played their home matches against Salgueiro at Aflitos, against Afogados at Arruda and against Sete de Setembro at Ilha do Retiro.
^{c} Santa Cruz played their home match against Íbis at Arena Pernambuco.
^{d} Sete de Setembro played their home matches at Lacerdão instead of their regular stadium Gigante do Agreste, Garanhuns. They played their home matches against Náutico at Arena Pernambuco and against Santa Cruz at Valdemar Viana de Araújo.
^{e} Vera Cruz played their home matches at Arena Pernambuco instead of their regular stadium Severino Cândido Carneiro, Vitória de Santo Antão. In the First stage, they played their home matches against Náutico at Antônio Inácio de Souza and against Íbis and Salgueiro at Lacerdão. In the Relegation stage, they played their home match against Sete de Setembro at Ilha do Retiro.

== Schedule ==
The schedule of the competition was as follows.

First Stage
Round 1:	22–26 January and 3 February	
Round 2:	29 January–2 February	
Round 3:	5–9 and 23 February	
Round 4:	9–10 and 16–17 February	
Round 5:	16–17, 22 and 26 February and 12 March	
Round 6:	20 and 27 February and 5–8 March	
Round 7:	19 February and 2–3 March	
Round 8:	12–13 February and 9–12 March	
Round 9:	16 March	
Relegation Stage
Round 1:	20 March	
Round 2:	23 March	
Round 3:	27 March	
Final Stages
Quarter-finals	19 March and 6 April	
Semi-finals	2 and 13 April	
	First leg	Second leg
Finals	21 April	30 April

== First stage ==
In the first stage, each team played the other nine teams in a single round-robin tournament. The teams were ranked according to points (3 points for a win, 1 point for a draw, and 0 points for a loss). If tied on points, the following criteria would be used to determine the ranking: 1. Wins; 2. Goal difference; 3. Goals scored; 4. Fewest red cards; 5. Fewest yellow cards; 6. Draw in the headquarters of the FPF.

Top two teams advanced to the semi-finals of the final stages, while teams from third to sixth places advanced to the quarter-finals. The four teams with the lowest number of points played a relegation stage.

The best team not qualified for the finals qualified for 2023 Copa do Brasil. Top two teams not already qualified for 2023 Série A, Série B or Série C qualified for 2023 Série D.

=== Standings ===
Pos	Team	Pld	W	D	L	GF	GA	GD	Pts	Qualification
1	Retrô	9	7	1	1	21	7	+14	22	Advance to semi-finals and qualify for 2023 Série D
2	Náutico	9	5	2	2	15	8	+7	17	Advance to semi-finals
3	Santa Cruz	9	5	2	2	19	14	+5	17	Advance to quarter-finals and qualify for 2023 Copa do Brasil and 2023 Série D
4	Sport	9	4	4	1	22	9	+13	16	Advance to quarter-finals
5	Salgueiro	9	4	3	2	16	11	+5	15	Advance to quarter-finals
6	Caruaru City	9	3	3	3	14	12	+2	12	Advance to quarter-finals
7	Afogados	9	2	4	3	13	18	−5	10	Advance to relegation stage
8	Vera Cruz	9	1	3	5	14	18	−4	6	Advance to relegation stage
9	Íbis	9	1	2	6	4	16	−12	5	Advance to relegation stage
10	Sete de Setembro (Note: Sete de Setembro were deducted three points.)	9	1	0	8	4	29	−25	0	Advance to relegation stage

Source: FPF

=== Results ===
Home \ Away	AFO	CAR	IBI	NAU	RET	SAL	SAN	SET	SPO	VER
Afogados		2–1		2–2		1–2		2–1		2–2
Caruaru City			1–0		2–1		1–2			3–3
Íbis	1–1					2–1		0–1	0–4	
Náutico		1–0	3–0		1–2	1–0			1–2	
Retrô	3–0		1–0					4–0	2–1	
Salgueiro		2–2			2–2		2–1	4–0	1–1	
Santa Cruz	5–2		3–0	1–1	0–4					2–1
Sete de Setembro		0–3		0–3			1–3			1–3
Sport	1–1	1–1					2–2	7–0		3–1
Vera Cruz			1–1	1–2	1–2	1–2				

Source: FPF
Legend: Blue = home team win; Yellow = draw; Red = away team win.

== Relegation stage ==
In the relegation stage, each team played the other three teams in a single round-robin tournament. The teams were ranked according to points (3 points for a win, 1 point for a draw, and 0 points for a loss). If tied on points, the following criteria would be used to determine the ranking: 1. Wins; 2. Goal difference; 3. Goals scored; 4. Fewest red cards; 5. Fewest yellow cards; 6. Draw in the headquarters of the FPF.

Originally the two teams with the lowest number of points would be relegated to the 2023 Série A2 but the FPF allowed the relegated teams to participate in the 2022 Série A2.

=== Standings and Results ===
Pos	Team	Pld	W	D	L	GF	GA	GD	Pts	Relegation	AFO	IBI	SET	VER
1	Afogados	3	1	2	0	5	2	+3	5			1–1		3–0
2	Íbis	3	1	2	0	4	2	+2	5				0–0	
3	Sete de Setembro (R)	3	0	3	0	3	3	0	3	Relegation to Série A2	1–1			
4	Vera Cruz (R)	3	0	1	2	3	8	−5	1	Relegation to Série A2		1–3	2–2	

Source: FPF
(R) Relegated

== Final stages ==
Starting from the quarter-finals, the teams played a single-elimination tournament with the following rules:

- Quarter-finals and semi-finals were played on a single-leg basis, with the higher-seeded team hosting the leg.
  - If tied, the penalty shoot-out would be used to determine the winners.
- Finals were played on a home-and-away two-legged basis, with the higher-seeded team hosting the second leg.
  - If tied on aggregate, the penalty shoot-out would be used to determine the winners.
- Extra time would not be played and away goals rule would not be used in final stages.
- Third place match was not played.

=== Bracket ===
Quarter-finals
3	Santa Cruz	3
6	Caruaru City	0
4	Sport	2 (2)
5	Salgueiro (p)	2 (4)

Semi-finals
2	Náutico (p)	0 (4)
3	Santa Cruz	0 (3)
1	Retrô	1
5	Salgueiro	0

Finals
2	Náutico (p)	0	1	1 (4)
1	Retrô	1	0	1 (2)

=== Quarter-finals ===
Team 1	Score	Team 2
Santa Cruz	3–0	Caruaru City
Sport	2–2 (2–4 p)	Salgueiro

==== Matches ====
19 March 2022
16:30

Santa Cruz	3–0	Caruaru City
Rafael Furtado 50'; Esquerdinha 72', 90'	Report

Estádio do Arruda, Recife
Attendance: 3,591
Referee: Gilberto Rodrigues Castro Júnior

6 April 2022
20:00

Sport	2–2	Salgueiro
Janelson 73' (o.g.); Pedro Naressi 78'	Report	Patrick Nonato 57'; Kady 86'
Penalties
Ronaldo (penalty scored); Sabino (penalty missed); Sander (penalty missed); Luciano Juba (penalty scored)	2–4	(penalty missed) Robinho; (penalty scored) Kady; (penalty scored) Danielzinho; (penalty scored) Wescley; (penalty scored) Lucas Franco

Estádio Ilha do Retiro, Recife
Attendance: 9,081
Referee: Diego Fernando Silva de Lima

=== Semi-finals ===
Team 1	Score	Team 2
Retrô	1–0	Salgueiro
Náutico	0–0 (4–3 p)	Santa Cruz

==== Matches ====
13 April 2022
21:30

Retrô	1–0	Salgueiro
Renato Henrique 35' (pen.)	Report

Arena Pernambuco, São Lourenço da Mata
Attendance: 2,823
Referee: Rodrigo José Pereira de Lima

Retrô qualified for the 2023 Copa do Brasil.

2 April 2022
16:30

Náutico	0–0	Santa Cruz
	Report
Penalties
Jean Carlos (penalty missed); Hereda (penalty scored); Pedro Vitor (penalty scored); Amarildo (penalty scored); Júnior Tavares (penalty scored)	4–3	(penalty scored) Esquerdinha; (penalty missed) Alex Alves; (penalty scored) Rodrigo Yuri; (penalty scored) Marcos Martins; (penalty missed) Edson Ratinho

Estádio dos Aflitos, Recife
Attendance: 10,006
Referee: Deborah Cecília Cruz Correia

Náutico qualified for the 2023 Copa do Brasil.

=== Finals ===
Team 1	Agg.	Team 2	1st leg	2nd leg
Náutico	1–1 (4–2 p)	Retrô	0–1	1–0

==== Matches ====
21 April 2022
16:30

Náutico	0–1	Retrô
	Report	Guilherme Paraíba 69'

Estádio dos Aflitos, Recife
Attendance: 14,497
Referee: Diego Fernando Silva de Lima

Náutico	Retrô

GK	1	(Brazil) Lucas Perri
DF	2	(Brazil) Hereda
DF	3	(Brazil) Carlão
DF	4	(Brazil) Camutanga
DF	6	(Brazil) Júnior Tavares	(yellow card) 51'
MF	5	(Brazil) Djavan		(substituted off) 69'
MF	8	(Brazil) Rhaldney	(yellow card) 4'
MF	10	(Brazil) Jean Carlos	(yellow card) 70'
MF	20	(Brazil) Ewandro		(substituted off) 46'
FW	16	(Brazil) Robinho		(substituted off) 72'
FW	9	(Brazil) Kieza (c)	(yellow card) 75'
Substitutes:
GK	12	(Brazil) Bruno Diniz
GK	26	(Brazil) Renan
DF	13	(Brazil) Thassio
DF	15	(Brazil) Luan
DF	21	(Brazil) Índio
MF	11	(Brazil) Juninho Carpina
MF	14	(Brazil) Ralph
MF	18	(Paraguay) Richard Franco
FW	7	(Brazil) Léo Passos		(substituted in) 69'
FW	17	(Brazil) Leandro Carvalho		(substituted in) 46'
FW	19	(Brazil) Amarildo
FW	22	(Brazil) Pedro Vitor		(substituted in) 72'
Coach:
(Brazil) Roberto Fernandes

GK	1	(Brazil) Jean	(yellow card) 77'
DF	2	(Brazil) Pedro Costa	(yellow card) 31'
DF	4	(Brazil) Guilherme Paraíba
DF	3	(Brazil) Renan Dutra
DF	6	(Brazil) Mayk
MF	5	(Brazil) Charles (c)
MF	7	(Brazil) Yuri Bigode	(yellow card) 58'	(substituted off) 73'
MF	8	(Brazil) Gelson		(substituted off) 66'
MF	9	(Brazil) João Guilherme	(yellow card) 19'	(substituted off) 33'
FW	10	(Brazil) Renato Henrique	(yellow card) 75'	(substituted off) 74'
FW	11	(Brazil) Gustavo Ermel		(substituted off) 65'
Substitutes:
GK	22	(Brazil) Erivelton
DF	13	(Brazil) Augusto Potiguar
DF	14	(Brazil) Tallyssom		(substituted in) 74'
DF	16	(Brazil) Guilherme Santos		(substituted in) 65'
DF	18	(Brazil) Lucas Silva		(substituted in) 73'
MF	15	(Brazil) Alencar		(substituted in) 66'
MF	17	(Brazil) Kauê
MF	19	(Brazil) Otávio
MF	23	(Brazil) Erivélton Araújo
FW	20	(Brazil) Radsley		(substituted in) 33'
FW	21	(Brazil) Rodrigo Fumaça
FW	25	(Brazil) Jhon
Coach:
(Brazil) Dico Woolley				(yellow card) 87'

Assistant referees:
Ricardo Bezerra Chianca
Marcelino Castro de Nazaré
Fourth official:
Anderson Luís Marques
Fifth official:
Dhiego Cavalcanti Pereira
Video assistant referee:
Tiago Nascimento dos Santos
Assistant video assistant referees:
José Daniel Torres de Araújo

30 April 2022
16:40

Retrô	0–1	Náutico
	Report	Pedro Vitor 45+6' (pen.)
Penalties
Charles (penalty missed); Pedro Costa (penalty missed); Augusto Potiguar (penalty scored); Guilherme Paraíba (penalty scored)	2–4	(penalty scored) Hereda; (penalty scored) Franco; (penalty missed) Camutanga; (penalty scored) Ewandro; (penalty scored) Júnior Tavares

Arena Pernambuco, São Lourenço da Mata
Attendance: 18,613
Referee: Deborah Cecília Cruz Correia

Retrô	Náutico

GK	1	(Brazil) Jean
DF	2	(Brazil) Pedro Costa
DF	4	(Brazil) Guilherme Paraíba
DF	3	(Brazil) Renan Dutra
DF	6	(Brazil) Mayk		(substituted off) 90'
MF	5	(Brazil) Charles (c)	(yellow card) 7'
MF	7	(Brazil) Yuri Bigode		(substituted off) 56'
MF	8	(Brazil) Gelson	(yellow card) 60'	(substituted off) 75'
FW	9	(Brazil) Radsley	(yellow card) 29'	(substituted off) 75'
FW	10	(Brazil) Renato Henrique
FW	11	(Brazil) Gustavo Ermel		(substituted off) 56'
Substitutes:
GK	22	(Brazil) Erivelton
DF	13	(Brazil) Augusto Potiguar		(substituted in) 90'
DF	14	(Brazil) Tallyssom
DF	15	(Brazil) Lucas Silva
DF	16	(Brazil) Guilherme Santos		(substituted in) 56'
MF	17	(Brazil) Alencar		(substituted in) 75'
MF	18	(Brazil) Kauê
MF	20	(Brazil) Otávio
MF	21	(Brazil) João Guilherme		(substituted in) 56'
MF	23	(Brazil) Erivélton Araújo
FW	19	(Brazil) Rodrigo Fumaça		(substituted in) 75'
FW	25	(Brazil) Jhon
Coach:
(Brazil) Dico Woolley				(yellow card) 44'

GK	1	(Brazil) Lucas Perri
DF	2	(Brazil) Hereda
DF	3	(Brazil) Carlão
DF	4	(Brazil) Camutanga (c)
DF	6	(Brazil) Júnior Tavares
MF	14	(Brazil) Ralph	(yellow card) 42'	(substituted off) 62'
MF	8	(Brazil) Rhaldney	(yellow card) 45+8'	(substituted off) 73'
MF	17	(Brazil) Eduardo Teixeira		(substituted off) 62'
FW	10	(Brazil) Jean Carlos	(red card) 22'
FW	19	(Brazil) Léo Passos	(yellow card) 39'	(substituted off) 62'
FW	20	(Brazil) Pedro Vitor	(yellow card) 11'	(substituted off) 70'
Substitutes:
GK	12	(Brazil) Bruno Diniz
DF	13	(Brazil) Thassio	(yellow card) 45+8'
DF	15	(Brazil) Bryan
DF	21	(Brazil) Wellington
MF	5	(Brazil) Djavan		(substituted in) 62'
MF	18	(Paraguay) Richard Franco		(substituted in) 73'
MF	23	(Brazil) Juninho Carpina
FW	7	(Brazil) Ewandro		(substituted in) 62'
FW	9	(Brazil) Kieza
FW	11	(Brazil) Leandro Carvalho		(substituted in) 62'
FW	16	(Brazil) Robinho		(substituted in) 70'
FW	22	(Brazil) Amarildo
Coach:
(Brazil) Roberto Fernandes

Assistant referees:
Clóvis Amaral da Silva
Bruno César Chaves Vieira
Fourth official:
Rodrigo José Pereira de Lima
Fifth official:
Karla Renata Cavalcanti de Santana
Video assistant referee:
José Woshington da Silva
Assistant video assistant referees:
Francisco Chaves Bezerra Júnior

Náutico qualified for the 2023 Copa do Nordeste.

2022 Campeonato Pernambucano Champions

Náutico

24th title

== Overall table ==
Pos	Team	Pld	W	D	L	GF	GA	GD	Pts	Qualification or relegation
1	Náutico	12	6	3	3	16	9	+7	21	Champions and 2023 Copa do Brasil
2	Retrô	12	9	1	2	23	8	+15	28	Runners-up, 2023 Copa do Brasil and 2023 Série D
3	Santa Cruz	11	6	3	2	22	14	+8	21	2023 Copa do Brasil and 2023 Série D
4	Salgueiro	11	4	4	3	18	14	+4	16	
5	Sport (Note: Sport qualified for the Copa do Brasil via 2022 Copa do Nordeste.)	10	4	5	1	24	11	+13	17	2023 Copa do Brasil
6	Caruaru City	10	3	3	4	14	15	−1	12	
7	Afogados	12	3	6	3	18	20	−2	15	
8	Íbis	12	2	4	6	8	18	−10	10	
9	Vera Cruz	12	1	4	7	17	26	−9	7	Relegation to 2022 Campeonato Pernambucano A2.
10	Sete de Setembro (Note: Sete de Setembro were deducted three points.)	12	1	3	8	7	32	−25	3	Relegation to 2022 Campeonato Pernambucano A2.

Source: FPF

== Top goalscorers ==
Rank	Player	Team	Goals
1	(Brazil) Renato Henrique	Retrô	7
2	(Brazil) Braga	Vera Cruz	5
2	(Brazil) Rafael Furtado	Santa Cruz	5
4	(Brazil) Anderson Chaves	Afogados	4
4	(Brazil) Caveirinha	Vera Cruz	4
4	(Brazil) Esquerdinha	Santa Cruz	4
4	(Brazil) Juninho Carpina	Náutico	4
4	(Brazil) Lucão	Salgueiro	4
4	(Chile) Javier Parraguez	Sport	4
4	(Brazil) Tarcísio	Santa Cruz	4

Source:FPF

== 2022 Campeonato Pernambucano team ==
The 2022 Campeonato Pernambucano team was a squad consisting of the eleven most impressive players at the tournament.

Pos.	Player	Team
GK	Lucas Perri	Náutico
DF	Hereda	Náutico
DF	Lucão	Salgueiro
DF	Guilherme Paraíba	Retrô
DF	Júnior Tavares	Náutico
MF	Charles	Retrô
MF	Kady	Salgueiro
MF	Jean Carlos	Náutico
MF	Renato Henrique ^{a}	Retrô
FW	Luciano Juba	Sport
FW	Rafael Furtado	Santa Cruz

a. Top scorer

Source:Diario de Pernambuco
