= Kauê =

Kauê may refer to:

- Kauê (footballer, born 1983), Brazilian football player, full name Kauê Caetano da Silva
- Kauê (footballer, born 1995), Brazilian football player, full name Kauê da Silva, from São Caetano do Sul
- Kauê (footballer, born 1997), Brazilian football player, full name Kauê da Silva, from São Paulo
- Kauê (footballer, born February 2004), Brazilian football player, full name Kauê Vinicius de Souza Camargo
- Kauê (footballer, born October 2004), Brazilian football player, full name Kauê Rodrigues Pessanha
- Kauê Canela (born 2004), Brazilian football player, full name Kauê Canela Arroula
- Kauê Penna (born 2006), Brazilian singer, member of Latin American boy group Santos Bravos
