= Otávio (footballer, born 1998) =

Brazilian footballer

Personal information
- Full name: Otávio Santos Salvador
- Date of birth: 11 November 1998 (age 27)
- Place of birth: Sousa, Brazil
- Height: 1.90 m (6 ft 3 in)
- Position: Midfielder

Team information
- Current team: São José-SP (on loan from Portuguesa Santista)

Senior career*
Years	Team	Apps	(Gls)
2018–2019	Boca Júnior	9	(0)
2019	América de Pedrinhas	10	(4)
2020–2021	Itabaiana	18	(4)
2021–2023	Retrô	15	(4)
2022	→ Vera Cruz (loan)	10	(3)
2023	→ Democrata GV (loan)	0	(0)
2023	Olímpico	5	(1)
2024	Nacional de Patos	7	(1)
2024	Jaguar	12	(1)
2025	ASA	7	(0)
2025	Falcon	0	(0)
2025	Belo Jardim	6	(2)
2026–	Portuguesa Santista	20	(6)
2026	→ Piauí (loan)	6	(1)
2026–	→ São José-SP (loan)	0	(0)
- * Club domestic league appearances and goals as of 23:31, 9 September 2026 (UTC)

Otávio Santos Salvador (born 11 November 1998), simply known as Otávio, is a Brazilian footballer who plays as a midfielder for São José-SP, on loan from Portuguesa Santista.

== Career ==
Born in Sousa, Paraíba, Otávio began his career in Sergipe in 2018, with Boca Júnior. In the following year, he helped América de Pedrinhas to win the Campeonato Sergipano Série A2, also scoring the decisive goal in the semi-final.

Ahead of the 2020 season, Otávio signed for Itabaiana, and was sparingly used until rescinding his link on 27 May 2021. He later moved to Retrô, where he also featured rarely and served loan stints at Vera Cruz and Democrata GV. With the latter one, however, he was unable to play due to an injury.

On 30 November 2023, after a short stint at Olímpico, Otávio was announced at Nacional de Patos. He later won the 2024 Campeonato Pernambucano Série A2 with Jaguar, before signing for ASA on 17 October of that year.

Otávio represented Falcon and Belo Jardim in the 2025 campaign, before agreeing to a deal with Marília on 10 November of that year. In December, however, he was not in the club's pre-season due to an injury, and later movd to Portuguesa Santista on 19 January 2026, after both clubs agreed on a transfer fee.

On 10 May 2026, after helping the Briosa to win the Campeonato Paulista Série A3, Otávio was loaned to Série D side Piauí. In July, he agreed to a move to Ponte Preta, but the deal fell through due to the club's transfer ban, and he later joined São José-SP for the Copa Paulista on 28 August, also in a temporary deal.

== Career statistics ==
As of 9 September 2026

Club	Season	League			State League		Cup		Continental		Other		Total	
Club	Season	Division	Apps	Goals	Apps	Goals	Apps	Goals	Apps	Goals	Apps	Goals	Apps	Goals
Boca Júnior	2018	Sergipano	—		3	0	—		—		—		3	0
Boca Júnior	2019	Sergipano	—		6	0	—		—		—		6	0
Boca Júnior	Total		—		9	0	—		—		—		9	0
América de Pedrinhas	2019	Sergipano Série A2	—		10	4	—		—		—		10	4
Itabaiana	2020	Série D	3	2	5	2	—		—		—		8	4
Itabaiana	2021	Série D	—		10	0	—		—		—		10	0
Itabaiana	Total		3	2	15	2	—		—		—		18	4
Retrô	2021	Série D	9	2	—		—		—		1 (Note: Appearance(s) in Copa do Nordeste)	0	10	2
Retrô	2022	Série D	3	1	3	1	—		—		—		6	2
Retrô	Total		12	3	3	1	—		—		1	0	16	4
Vera Cruz (loan)	2022	Pernambucano Série A2	—		10	3	—		—		—		10	3
Democrata GV (loan)	2023	Série D	—		0	0	—		—		—		0	0
Olímpico	2023	Sergipano Série A2	—		5	1	—		—		—		5	1
Nacional de Patos	2024	Paraibano	—		7	1	—		—		—		7	1
Jaguar	2024	Pernambucano Série A2	—		12	1	—		—		—		12	1
ASA	2025	Série D	1	0	6	0	1	0	—		6 (Note: One appearance in Copa do Nordeste, five appearances and two goals in Copa Alagoas)	2	14	2
Falcon	2025	Sergipano	—		—		—		—		6 (Note: Appearance(s) in Copa Governo do Estado de Sergipe)	0	6	0
Belo Jardim	2025	Pernambucano Série A2	—		6	2	—		—		—		6	2
Portuguesa Santista	2026	Paulista A3	—		20	6	—		—		—		20	6
Piauí (loan)	2026	Série D	6	1	—		—		—		—		6	1
São José-SP (loan)	2026	Paulista A2	—		—		—		—		0	0	0	0
Career total			22	7	103	21	1	0	0	0	13	2	139	30

== Honours ==
América de Pedrinhas

- Campeonato Sergipano Série A2: 2019

Jaguar

- Campeonato Pernambucano Série A2: 2024

Portuguesa Santista

- Campeonato Paulista Série A3: 2026
