= Kauê da Silva =

Kauê da Silva may refer to:

- Kauê (footballer, born 1995), Brazilian football midfielder
- Kauê (footballer, born 1997), Brazilian football forward
