= Vitinho =

Vitinho may refer to:

- Vitinho (footballer, born 1989), full name Victor da Silva Medeiros, Brazilian former footballer
- Vitinho (footballer, born 1990), full name Victor Hugo Machado Maia Mesquita, Brazilian football midfielder
- Vitinho (footballer, born May 1993), full name Victor Guilherme dos Santos Carvalho, Brazilian football forward
- Vitinho (footballer, born October 1993), full name Victor Vinícius Coelho dos Santos, Brazilian football attacking midfielder
- Vitinho (footballer, born March 1998), full name Victor Hugo Santana Carvalho, Brazilian football midfielder
- Vitinho (footballer, born September 1998), full name João Victor Souza dos Santos, Brazilian football forward
- Vitinho (footballer, born April 1999), full name Vitor Hugo Naum dos Santos, Brazilian football forward
- Vitinho (footballer, born July 1999), full name Victor Alexander da Silva, Brazilian football defender
- Vitinho (footballer, born January 2000), full name Victor Gabriel Moura de Oliveira, Brazilian football midfielder
- Vitinho (footballer, born December 2000), full name Victor Julio Alves de Paula, Brazilian football midfielder
- Vitinho (footballer, born April 2001), fill name Vitor Samuel Ferreira Arantes, Brazilian football winger
- Vitinho (footballer, born February 2004), full name Vitor Hugo Amorim de Assis, Brazilian football midfielder
- Vitinho (footballer, born November 2004), full name Victor Hugo da Silva Costa, Brazilian football midfielder
