= 2021 Campeonato Pernambucano =

Campeonato Pernambucano
- Season: 2021
- Dates: 24 February – 23 May
- Champions: Náutico (23rd title)
- Relegated: Central; Vitória das Tabocas
- 2022 Copa do Brasil: Náutico; Salgueiro; Sport
- 2022 Copa do Nordeste: Náutico; Sport (via RNC)
- 2022 Copa do Nordeste qualification: Santa Cruz; Retrô; Central (via RNC)
- 2022 Série D: Afogados; Retrô
- Matches played: 57
- Goals scored: 142 (2.49 per match)
- Top goalscorer: Kieza (10 goals)

The 2021 Campeonato Pernambucano da Série A1 was the 107th edition of the state championship of Pernambuco organized by FPF. The championship began on 24 February and ended on 23 May. Salgueiro were the defending champions but they were eliminated in the semi-finals.

The finals were contested in two-legged home-and-away format between Náutico and Sport. Tied 2–2 on aggregate, Náutico won 5–3 on penalties, winning the tournament for the 23rd time. As champions, Náutico qualified for 2022 Copa do Brasil and 2022 Copa do Nordeste. The runners-up, Sport also qualified for 2022 Copa do Brasil and 2022 Copa do Nordeste (via RNC), while Salgueiro, the best placed team in the first stage not already qualified, gained the third berth for 2022 Copa do Brasil.

== Teams ==
Ten teams were competing, eight returning from the 2020 and two promoted from the 2020 Pernambucano A2 Championship: Vera Cruz and Sete de Setembro.

Club	City	Stadium	Coordinates	Capacity
Afogados	Afogados da Ingazeira	Valdemar Viana de Araújo	7.7587°S 37.6339°W	1,735
Central	Caruaru	Lacerdão	8.2784°S 35.9752°W	19,478
Náutico	Recife	Aflitos	8.0406°S 34.8990°W	22,856
Retrô	Camaragibe	Arena Pernambuco (São Lourenço da Mata)^{[a]}	8.0407°S 35.0104°W	44,300
Salgueiro	Salgueiro	Cornélio de Barros	8.0760°S 39.1216°W	12,070
Santa Cruz	Recife	Arruda	8.0267°S 34.8933°W	60,044
Sete de Setembro	Garanhuns	Gigante do Agreste^{[b]}	8.8804°S 36.4675°W	6,356
Sport	Recife	Ilha do Retiro	8.0630°S 34.9051°W	32,983
Vera Cruz	Vitória de Santo Antão	Arena Pernambuco (São Lourenço da Mata)^{[c]}	8.0407°S 35.0104°W	44,300
Vitória das Tabocas	Vitória de Santo Antão	Arena Pernambuco (São Lourenço da Mata)^{[c]}	8.0407°S 35.0104°W	44,300

^{a} In the Relegation stage, Retrô played their home match against Sete de Setembro at Arruda.
^{b} In the First stage, Sete de Setembro played their home matches at Lacerdão, except the match against Vera Cruz that was played at Cornélio de Barros. Only the match against Vitória das Tabocas (Relegation stage) was played at Gigante do Agreste.
^{c} Vera Cruz and Vitória das Tabocas played their home matches at Arena Pernambuco instead of their regular stadium Severino Cândido Carneiro, Vitória de Santo Antão. The matches Vitória das Tabocas v Vera Cruz and Vitória das Tabocas v Retrô (Relegation stage) were played at Arruda and Lacerdão, respectively.

The semi-finals and the first leg of the Final were played at Arena Pernambuco.

== Schedule ==
The schedule of the competition was as follows.

First Stage
Round 1:	24 and 27–28 February	
Round 2:	3 and 7–8 March	
Round 3:	13–14 and 21 March and 18 April	
Round 4:	27–28 March and 14 and 28 April	
Round 5:	31 March and 4 and 7 April	
Round 6:	14, 18, 21 and 28 April	
Round 7:	11, 18 and 21 April	
Round 8:	24–26 April	
Round 9:	2 May	
Relegation Stage
Round 1:	5 May	
Round 2:	9–10 May	
Round 3:	17 May	
Final Stages
Quarter-finals	5 May	
Semi-finals	9–10 May	
	First leg	Second leg
Finals	16 May	23 May

== First stage ==
In the first stage, each team played the other nine teams in a single round-robin tournament. The teams were ranked according to points (3 points for a win, 1 point for a draw, and 0 points for a loss). If tied on points, the following criteria would be used to determine the ranking: 1. Wins; 2. Goal difference; 3. Goals scored; 4. Fewest red cards; 5. Fewest yellow cards; 6. Draw in the headquarters of the FPF.

Top two teams advanced to the semi-finals of the final stages, while teams from third to sixth places advanced to the quarter-finals. The four teams with the lowest number of points played a relegation stage.

The best team not qualified for the finals qualified for 2022 Copa do Brasil. Top two teams not already qualified for 2022 Série A, Série B or Série C qualified for 2022 Série D.

=== Standings ===
Pos	Team	Pld	W	D	L	GF	GA	GD	Pts	Qualification
1	Náutico	9	7	1	1	24	11	+13	22	Advance to semi-finals
2	Sport	9	6	2	1	16	4	+12	20	Advance to semi-finals
3	Salgueiro (Note: Salgueiro and Vera Cruz declined to participate in the Série D. They were replaced by Retrô.)	9	4	2	3	10	9	+1	14	Advance to quarter-finals and qualify for 2022 Copa do Brasil
4	Santa Cruz	9	3	4	2	12	9	+3	13	Advance to quarter-finals
5	Afogados	9	2	6	1	9	7	+2	12	Advance to quarter-finals and qualify for 2022 Série D
6	Vera Cruz	9	3	2	4	12	16	−4	11	Advance to quarter-finals
7	Retrô	9	3	1	5	15	15	0	10	Advance to relegation stage and qualify for 2022 Série D
8	Central	9	2	3	4	8	16	−8	9	Advance to relegation stage
9	Sete de Setembro	9	1	3	5	7	12	−5	6	Advance to relegation stage
10	Vitória das Tabocas	9	1	2	6	7	21	−14	5	Advance to relegation stage

Source: FPF

=== Results ===
Home \ Away	AFO	CEN	NAU	RET	SAL	SAN	SET	SPO	VER	VIT
Afogados				1–1		0–0		0–0	2–1	2–0
Central	1–1			1–4	2–1	1–1	0–0			
Náutico	2–2	5–0				2–1			3–1	4–1
Retrô			1–4			2–3	3–2	0–1		
Salgueiro	1–0		2–3	1–0			2–0			1–1
Santa Cruz					0–0		0–2	1–1	4–1	2–0
Sete de Setembro	1–1		0–1					0–2	1–1	
Sport		2–0	3–0		1–2					3–0
Vera Cruz		1–0		2–1	2–0			1–3		
Vitória das Tabocas		1–3		0–3			2–1		2–2	

Source: FPF
Legend: Blue = home team win; Yellow = draw; Red = away team win.

== Relegation stage ==
In the relegation stage each team played the other three teams in a single round-robin tournament. The two teams with the lowest number of points were relegated to the 2022 Campeonato Pernambucano A2. The teams were ranked according to points (3 points for a win, 1 point for a draw, and 0 points for a loss). If tied on points, the following criteria would be used to determine the ranking: 1. Wins; 2. Goal difference; 3. Goals scored; 4. Fewest red cards; 5. Fewest yellow cards; 6. Draw in the headquarters of the FPF.

=== Standings and Results ===
Pos	Team	Pld	W	D	L	GF	GA	GD	Pts	Relegation	RET	SET	VIT	CEN
1	Retrô	3	2	0	1	7	2	+5	6			0–1		2–1
2	Sete de Setembro	3	1	2	0	1	0	+1	5				0–0	
3	Vitória das Tabocas (R)	3	1	1	1	2	5	−3	4	Relegation to Pernambucano A2	0–5			
4	Central (R)	3	0	1	2	1	4	−3	1	Relegation to Pernambucano A2		0–0	0–2	

Source: FPF
(R) Relegated

== Final stages ==
Starting from the quarter-finals, the teams played a single-elimination tournament with the following rules:

- Quarter-finals and semi-finals were played on a single-leg basis, with the higher-seeded team hosting the leg.
  - If tied, the penalty shoot-out would be used to determine the winners.
- Finals were played on a home-and-away two-legged basis, with the higher-seeded team hosting the second leg.
  - If tied on aggregate, the penalty shoot-out would be used to determine the winners.
- Extra time would not be played and away goals rule would not be used in final stages.
- Third place match was not played.

=== Bracket ===
Quarter-finals
3	Salgueiro	2
6	Vera Cruz	1
4	Santa Cruz (p)	0 (5)
5	Afogados	0 (4)

Semi-finals
2	Sport	1
3	Salgueiro	0
1	Náutico	2
4	Santa Cruz	1

Finals
2	Sport	1	1	2 (3)
1	Náutico (p)	1	1	2 (5)

=== Quarter-finals ===
Team 1	Score	Team 2
Salgueiro	2–1	Vera Cruz
Santa Cruz	0–0 (5–4 p)	Afogados

==== Matches ====
5 May 2021
18:45

Salgueiro	2–1	Vera Cruz
Renato Henrique 1', 89'	Report	Vitinho 46'

Estádio Cornélio de Barros, Salgueiro
Attendance: 160
Referee: Anderson Luis Marques

5 May 2021
21:00

Santa Cruz	0–0	Afogados
	Report
Penalties
Chiquinho (penalty scored); Karl (penalty scored); Augusto César (penalty missed); França (penalty scored); Léo Gaúcho (penalty scored); Adriano (penalty scored)	5–4	(penalty scored) Gabriel Gonçalves; (penalty scored) Cal Rodrigues; (penalty missed) Arêz; (penalty scored) Wendel; (penalty scored) Jordan William; (penalty missed) Índio

Estádio do Arruda, Recife
Attendance: 155
Referee: Michelangelo Martins de Almeida Júnior

=== Semi-finals ===
Team 1	Score	Team 2
Náutico	2–1	Santa Cruz
Sport	1–0	Salgueiro

==== Matches ====
9 May 2021
16:00

Náutico	2–1	Santa Cruz
Kieza 19', 53' (pen.)	Report	Paiva 88' (o.g.)

Arena Pernambuco, São Lourenço da Mata
Attendance: 190
Referee: Rafael Traci (Santa Catarina)

Náutico qualified for the 2022 Copa do Brasil.

10 May 2021
20:00

Sport	1–0	Salgueiro
Iago Maidana 81' (pen.)	Report

Arena Pernambuco, São Lourenço da Mata
Attendance: 181
Referee: Anderson Daronco (Rio Grande do Sul)

Sport qualified for the 2022 Copa do Brasil.

=== Finals ===
Team 1	Agg.	Team 2	1st leg	2nd leg
Sport	2–2 (3–5 p)	Náutico	1–1	1–1

==== Matches ====
16 May 2021
16:00

Sport	1–1	Náutico
Everaldo 45'	Report	Wagner Leonardo 50'

Arena Pernambuco, São Lourenço da Mata
Attendance: 260
Referee: Wagner do Nascimento Magalhães (Rio de Janeiro)

23 May 2021
16:00

Náutico	1–1	Sport
Kieza 78'	Report	Mikael 87'
Penalties
Jean Carlos (penalty scored); Vinícius (penalty scored); Hereda (penalty scored); Giovanny (penalty scored); Kieza (penalty scored)	5–3	(penalty scored) Iago Maidana; (penalty scored) Mikael; (penalty scored) Tréllez; (penalty missed) Marquinhos

Estádio dos Aflitos, Recife
Attendance: 300
Referee: Rodolpho Toski Marques (Paraná)

Náutico qualified for the 2022 Copa do Nordeste.

2021 Campeonato Pernambucano Champions

Náutico

23rd title

== Overall table ==
Pos	Team	Pld	W	D	L	GF	GA	GD	Pts	Qualification or relegation
1	Náutico	12	8	3	1	28	14	+14	27	Champions and 2022 Copa do Brasil
2	Sport	12	7	4	1	19	6	+13	25	Runners-up and 2022 Copa do Brasil
3	Salgueiro (Note: Salgueiro and Vera Cruz declined to participate in the Série D. They were replaced by Retrô.)	11	5	2	4	12	11	+1	17	2022 Copa do Brasil
4	Santa Cruz	11	3	5	3	13	11	+2	14	
5	Afogados	10	2	7	1	9	7	+2	13	2022 Série D
6	Vera Cruz	10	3	2	5	13	18	−5	11	
7	Retrô	12	5	1	6	22	17	+5	16	2022 Série D
8	Sete de Setembro	12	2	5	5	8	12	−4	11	
9	Central	12	2	4	6	9	20	−11	10	Relegation to 2022 Campeonato Pernambucano A2.
10	Vitória das Tabocas	12	2	3	7	9	26	−17	9	Relegation to 2022 Campeonato Pernambucano A2.

Source: FPF

== Top goalscorers ==
Rank	Player	Team	Goals
1	Kieza	Náutico	10
2	Erick	Náutico	5
2	Mikael	Sport	5
2	Vinícius	Náutico	5
5	Fauver	Afogados	4
5	Kauê	Retrô	4
5	Mayco Félix	Retrô	4

Source:FPF

== 2021 Campeonato Pernambucano team ==
The 2021 Campeonato Pernambucano team was a squad consisting of the eleven most impressive players at the tournament.

Pos.	Player	Team
GK	Jordan	Santa Cruz
DF	Hereda	Náutico
DF	Iago Maidana	Sport
DF	Adryelson	Sport
DF	Sander	Sport
MF	Rhaldney	Náutico
MF	Djavan	Náutico
MF	Jean Carlos	Náutico
FW	Erick	Náutico
FW	Kieza ^{a}	Náutico
FW	Vinícius	Náutico

a. Top scorer

Source:Jornal do Commercio
