= Sandoval (footballer, born 1986) =

Brazilian footballer

Personal information
- Full name: Sandoval Araújo Lima
- Date of birth: 28 April 1986 (age 40)
- Place of birth: Bonito, Brazil
- Height: 1.88 m (6 ft 2 in)
- Position: Centre-back

Senior career*
Years	Team	Apps	(Gls)
2007	União Suzano		
2008	Cascavel CR		
2008	Independente-SP		
2009–2010	Flamengo-SP		
2011–2012	Santo André		
2013	Rio Branco-SP		
2013	Treze		
2014	Ferroviária		
2014–2018	São Caetano		
2018	Santa Cruz		
2019	Mirassol		
2019–2020	São Caetano		
2020	Ferroviária		
2021	Oeste		
2022	XV de Piracicaba		
2022–2023	Retrô		
2024	Maguary-PE		
2024	Caldense		
2025	Maguary-PE		
2025	Caldense		
- * Club domestic league appearances and goals as of 13 October 2024

Sandoval Araújo Lima (born 28 April 1986), simply known as Sandoval, is a Brazilian professional footballer who plays as a centre-back.

== Career ==
A defender, Sandoval played for clubs in different parts of Brazil. He gained greater prominence at São Caetano, where he won the Série A2 in 2017 and 2020, and the Copa Paulista in 2019. He made more than 170 appearances for AD São Caetano, between the two spells.

In 2024 season, Sandoval played for Maguary in 2024 Campeonato Pernambucano and AA Caldense in the dispute of the Campeonato Mineiro Módulo II. In 2025 he again defended the Maguary and Caldense teams.

== Honours ==
São Caetano

- Campeonato Paulista Série A2: 2017, 2020
- Copa Paulista: 2019
