= Dico Woolley =

Brazilian professional football manager (born 1982)

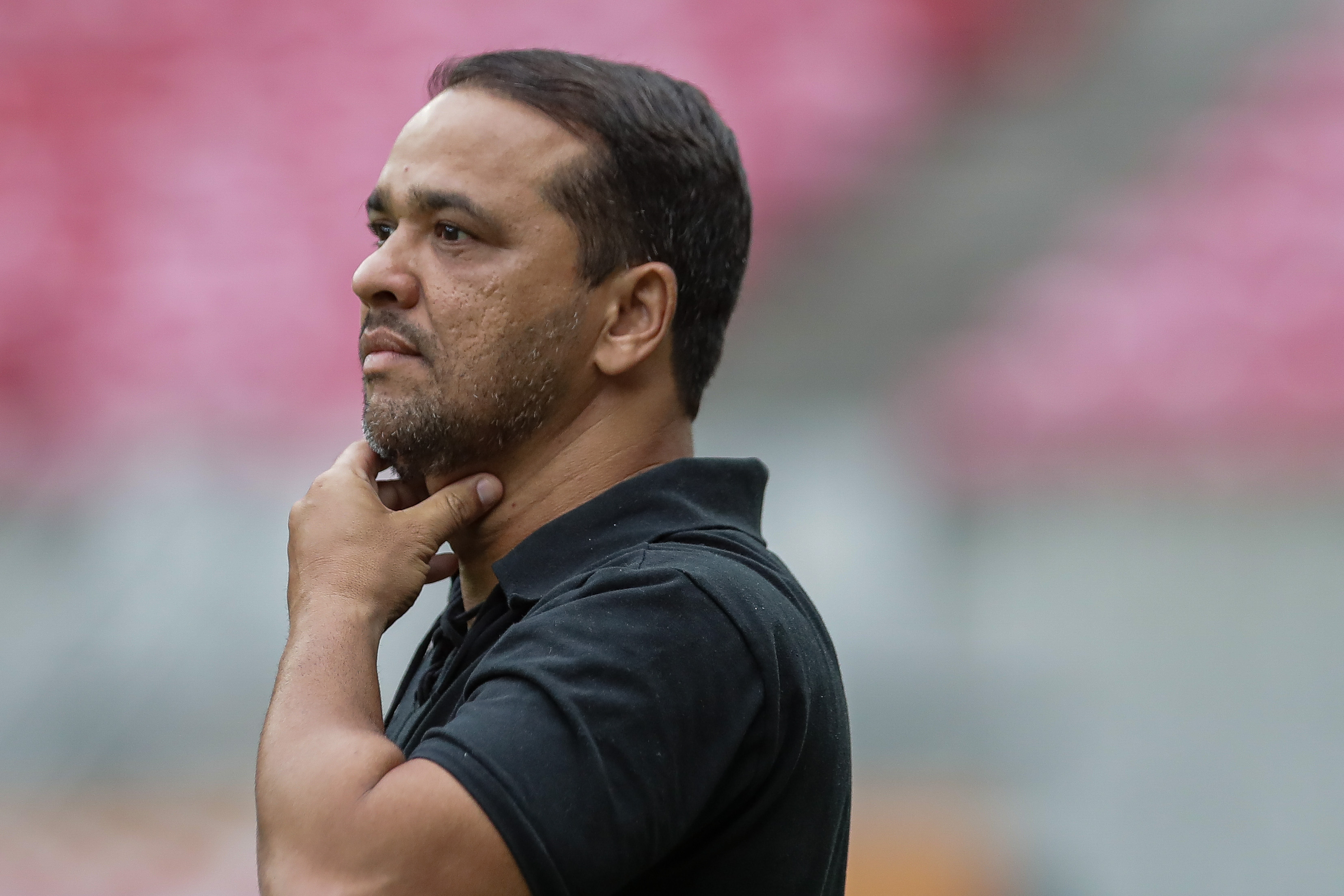
- Woolley as head coach of Retrô in 2025

Personal information
- Full name: Humberto Targino Woolley Filho
- Date of birth: 3 January 1982 (age 44)
- Place of birth: Olinda, Brazil

Team information
- Current team: Maguary (head coach)

Managerial career
- Years: Team
- 2011: Náutico U15
- 2012: Jaguar (assistant)
- 2015: Retrô U15
- 2018: Náutico U17
- 2019: Flamengo de Arcoverde (assistant)
- 2020: Retrô U17
- 2021: Retrô (assistant)
- 2021: Bahia (assistant)
- 2021–2023: Retrô
- 2023: Campinense
- 2024: Manauara
- 2024: River
- 2025: Retrô
- 2025: Iguatu
- 2025: Sergipe
- 2026: ASA
- 2026: Manaus
- 2026–: Maguary

Humberto Targino Woolley Filho (born 3 January 1982), known as Dico Woolley, is a Brazilian professional football coach and former footvolley player. He is the current head coach of Maguary.

== Career ==
Born in Olinda, Pernambuco, Woolley played footvolley professionally before retiring and subsequently graduating in Physical education. He began his coaching career with the under-15 side of Náutico in 2011, before moving to Libya to work as Baltemar Brito's fitness coach at Al-Ittihad Club in 2013.

Woolley subsequently worked as a youth coach for Retrô and Náutico, before becoming an assistant of Nilson at Flamengo de Arcoverde for the 2019 season. He then returned to Retrô, before becoming Dado Cavalcanti's assistant at Bahia in June 2021.

On 22 September 2021, Woolley was named head coach of Retrô, after the departure of Milton Mendes. He led the club to the runner-up position in both the 2022 and 2023 editions of the Campeonato Pernambucano, but was sacked on 13 May 2023, after a winless start in the year's Série D.

On 22 June 2023, Woolley was named Campinense head coach, replacing sacked Luan Carlos, but left on 25 July after just five matches. On 25 September, he was announced as the head coach of Manauara for the upcoming season, but was dismissed the following 25 January, after just two matches.

On 22 February 2024, Woolley was appointed head coach of River. On 3 April, after being eliminated from the 2024 Copa do Nordeste, he was relieved from his duties.

On 1 October 2024, Woolley agreed to return to Retrô as head coach for the ensuing campaign, with the club now in the Série C. The following 12 January, however, he was sacked after two winless matches, and took over Iguatu late in the month.
