= Rafinha (footballer, born April 1988) =

Brazilian footballer

Personal information
- Full name: Rafael Chagas Machado
- Date of birth: 1 April 1988 (age 38)
- Place of birth: Campo Mourão, Brazil
- Height: 1.73 m (5 ft 8 in)
- Positions: Left back; left midfielder

Youth career
- Atlético Sorocaba

Senior career*
Years	Team	Apps	(Gls)
2007	Atlético Sorocaba		
2009	Marília	1	(1)
2010–2011	Metropolitano	0	(0)
2011–2012	Vaduz	19	(1)
2013	Metropolitano	0	(0)
2013	Joinville	23	(1)
2014	Avaí	0	(0)
2014	Vila Nova	4	(0)
2015	Foz do Iguaçu	2	(0)
2016–2020	CSA	161	(7)
2021	Náutico	21	(0)
- * Club domestic league appearances and goals as of 4 September 2021

Rafael Chagas Machado (born 1 April 1988), commonly known as Rafinha is a Brazilian professional footballer who plays as a left back.

== Club career ==
Born in Campo Mourão, Rafinha made his professional debut with Atlético Sorocaba in 2007. In the following years, he went on to represent Marília and Metropolitano.

On 13 May 2011, Rafinha moved abroad and joined Liechtensteiner club Vaduz on a one-year contract. On 4 August, he scored his first goal for the club in a 2–1 victory against Hapoel Tel Aviv in the UEFA Europa League qualifiers, although his side was eliminated due aggregate defeat. On 4 April 2012, he scored a goal in a 3–1 win against Triesenberg in Liechtenstein Cup, as a result of which his side progressed to the final of the Cup.

After a stint with Metropolitano, Rafinha signed with Joinville on 25 April 2013. On 4 June, he scored his first goal for the club in a 2–0 victory against ASA.

In January 2014, Rafinha moved to Avaí. On 16 June, he moved to Vila Nova for the upcoming Série B.

After spending one season with Foz do Iguaçu in Série D, Rafinha switched to fellow league club side CSA on 21 November 2015. In his first season with the club, he provided ten assists, with his side winning promotion to Série C.

Rafinha played regularly during the 2018 Série B, with his side achieving promotion to Série A after finishing Série B as runners-up. His contract was also extended for 2019 in December.

== Style of play ==
Although a left back, Rafinha can also play in the left midfield position.

== Honours ==
Náutico

- Campeonato Pernambucano: 2021
