= Carlão (footballer, born 2001) =

Brazilian footballer

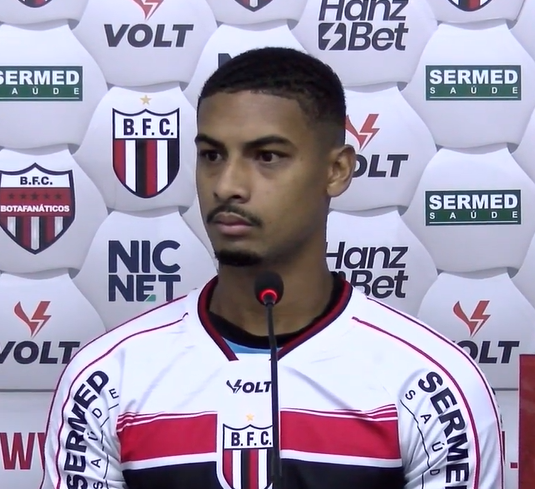
- Carlão in 2025

Personal information
- Full name: Carlos Eduardo da Silva Santos
- Date of birth: 12 March 2001 (age 25)
- Place of birth: Recife, Brazil
- Height: 1.86 m (6 ft 1 in)
- Position: Centre-back

Team information
- Current team: Botafogo-SP

Youth career
- 2018–2021: Náutico
- 2019: → Fluminense (loan)
- 2021: → Corinthians (loan)

Senior career*
Years	Team	Apps	(Gls)
2020–2022	Náutico	42	(0)
2022–2023	Almería B	21	(0)
2024	Paysandu	20	(2)
2025	Inter de Limeira	7	(0)
2025–	Botafogo-SP	27	(0)
- * Club domestic league appearances and goals as of 18 November 2026

Carlos Eduardo da Silva Santos (born 12 March 2001), known as Carlos Eduardo or Carlão, is a Brazilian footballer who plays as a central defender for Botafogo-SP.

== Career ==
=== Náutico ===
Born in Recife, Pernambuco, Carlão started his career with the youth sides of hometown club Náutico. In February 2019, he moved to Fluminense on loan, being initially assigned to the under-20s.

Back to Náutico in July 2019, Carlão made his first team debut on 19 July 2020, starting in a 2–1 Campeonato Pernambucano away win over Salgueiro, and providing an assist to Thiago Fernandes' opening goal. On 12 March of the following year, he renewed his contract until the end of 2023.

On 24 March 2021, Carlão moved to Corinthians also on loan, and joined their under-20 squad. In June, however, his loan with Timão was cancelled, after the club and Náutico failed to reach an agreement for other players.

Upon returning to his parent club, Carlão was immediately assigned to the main squad, and featured regularly in the year's Série B.

=== Almería ===
On 5 October 2022, Carlão moved abroad for the first time in his career, and was announced at La Liga club UD Almería; he was initially assigned to the reserves in Tercera Federación.

== Career statistics ==
As of 1 November 2025

Appearances and goals by club, season and competition
Club	Season	League			State League		Cup		Continental		Other		Total	
Club	Season	Division	Apps	Goals	Apps	Goals	Apps	Goals	Apps	Goals	Apps	Goals	Apps	Goals
Náutico	2020	Série B	6	0	3	0	0	0	—		1 (Note: Appearance(s) in Copa do Nordeste)	0	10	0
Náutico	2021	Série B	13	0	1	0	0	0	—		—		14	0
Náutico	2022	Série B	11	0	8	0	1	0	—		8	0	28	0
Náutico	Total		30	0	12	0	1	0	0	0	9	0	52	0
Almería B	2022–23	Tercera Federación	21	0	—		—		—		—		21	0
Paysandu	2024	Série B	9	0	7	1	1	0	—		3	1	20	2
Inter de Limeira	2025	Série D	—		6	0	1	0	—		—		7	0
Botafogo-SP	2025	Série B	19	0	0	0	0	0	—		—		19	0
Career total			79	0	25	1	3	0	0	0	12	1	119	2

== Honours ==
Náutico

- Campeonato Pernambucano: 2021, 2022

Paysandu

- Campeonato Paraense: 2024
- Copa Verde: 2024
