= Camutanga (footballer) =

Brazilian footballer (born 1993)

Personal information
- Full name: Cleidson Andrade de Souza Silva
- Date of birth: 27 September 1993 (age 33)
- Place of birth: Camutanga, Brazil
- Height: 1.89 m (6 ft 2 in)
- Position: Centre back

Team information
- Current team: Vitória
- Number: 3

Youth career
- 2012–2013: Sport Recife

Senior career*
Years	Team	Apps	(Gls)
2012	Auto Esporte		
2014–2015	Sport Recife	0	(0)
2014	→ Timbaúba (loan)		
2014–2015	→ Auto Esporte (loan)	17	(0)
2015	Vitória das Tabocas	1	(0)
2016	Pesqueira	9	(0)
2016–2017	Santa Rita	19	(1)
2016	→ CSA (loan)	0	(0)
2017	→ Bangu (loan)	6	(0)
2017–2022	Náutico	135	(6)
2022	Atlético Goianiense	1	(0)
2023–	Vitória	114	(4)
2025	→ Remo (loan)	14	(0)
- * Club domestic league appearances and goals as of 8 April 2026

Cleidson Andrade de Souza Silva (born 27 September 1993), commonly known as Camutanga, is a Brazilian footballer who plays as a central defender for Vitória.

== Club career ==
Born in Camutanga, Pernambuco, he began his career with Auto Esporte at the age of 18, before joining Sport Recife's youth setup after being approved on a trial. After struggling with knee injuries, he returned to Auto Esporte for the 2014 season, and subsequently represented Vitória das Tabocas and Pesqueira in his native state.

In March 2016 Camutanga joined Santa Rita. In April, he was announced at ASA, but the move never materialized, and he was loaned to CSA in May.

Upon returning to Santa Rita for the 2017 season, Camutanga was an undisputed starter before moving on loan to Série D side Bangu on 29 April. On 15 December, he signed for Náutico in the Série C.

Camutanga became a regular starter for Timbu, and helped in the club's promotion to the Série B in 2019. On 8 June 2021, he renewed his contract until the end of 2022.

On 26 June 2022, Camutanga agreed to join Série A side Atlético Goianiense, with the deal being effective on 18 July.

== Career statistics ==
As of 15 February 2024

Club	Season	League			State League		Cup		Continental		Other		Total	
Club	Season	Division	Apps	Goals	Apps	Goals	Apps	Goals	Apps	Goals	Apps	Goals	Apps	Goals
Auto Esporte	2014	Paraibano	—		15	0	—		—		—		15	0
Auto Esporte	2015	Paraibano	—		2	0	—		—		—		2	0
Auto Esporte	Subtotal		—		17	0	—		—		—		17	0
Vitória das Tabocas	2015	Pernambucano Série A2	—		1	0	—		—		—		1	0
Pesqueira	2016	Pernambucano	—		9	0	—		—		—		9	0
Santa Rita	2016	Alagoano	—		6	0	—		—		—		6	0
Santa Rita	2017	Alagoano	—		13	1	—		—		—		13	1
Santa Rita	Subtotal		—		19	1	—		—		—		19	1
CSA (loan)	2016	Série D	0	0	—		—		—		—		0	0
Bangu (loan)	2017	Série D	6	0	—		—		—		—		6	0
Náutico	2018	Série B	15	0	9	0	6	1	—		7 (Note: Appearance(s) in Copa do Nordeste)	0	37	1
Náutico	2019	Série B	19	1	6	0	0	0	—		6	0	31	1
Náutico	2020	Série B	29	2	0	0	0	0	—		—		29	2
Náutico	2021	Série B	31	3	9	0	0	0	—		—		40	3
Náutico	2022	Série B	7	0	10	0	1	0	—		5	0	23	0
Náutico	Subtotal		101	6	34	0	7	1	—		18	0	160	7
Atlético Goianiense	2022	Série A	1	0	—		—		—		—		1	0
Vitória	2023	Série B	33	2	7	0	1	0	—		8	1	49	3
Vitória	2024	Série A	0	0	6	1	0	0	—		2	0	8	1
Vitória	Subtotal		33	2	13	1	1	0	—		10	1	57	4
Career total			135	8	93	2	8	1	0	0	28	1	264	12

== Titles ==
Náutico

- Campeonato Brasileiro Série C: 2019
- Campeonato Pernambucano: 2018, 2021 e 2022

Vitória

- Campeonato Brasileiro Série B: 2023
- Campeonato Baiano: 2024
