= Renato Henrique =

Brazilian footballer (born 1993)

Personal information
- Full name: Renato Henrique Ferreira Silvestre da Silva
- Date of birth: 10 October 1993 (age 33)
- Place of birth: Recife, Brazil
- Height: 1.79 m (5 ft 10 in)
- Positions: Attacking midfielder; forward

Team information
- Current team: América-PE

Youth career
- Náutico
- 2011–2012: → Palmeiras (loan)

Senior career*
| Years | Team | Apps | (Gls) |
| 2013–2015 | Náutico | 48 | (5) |
| 2016 | Boa Esporte | 4 | (1) |
| 2016–2017 | Guarani | 23 | (2) |
| 2018 | Desportivo Brasil | 13 | (2) |
| 2019–2021 | Salgueiro | 48 | (15) |
| 2019 | → Decisão (loan) | 14 | (10) |
| 2021 | → Hercílio Luz (loan) | 13 | (3) |
| 2021 | Jacuipense | 8 | (1) |
| 2021 | Castanhal | 2 | (0) |
| 2022–2024 | Retrô | 56 | (11) |
| 2023 | → Vera Cruz (loan) | 10 | (17) |
| 2024– | América-PE | 20 | (20) |
| 2025 | → Madureira (loan) | 14 | (5) |
| 2025 | → North (loan) | 9 | (4) |
| 2026 | → Porto Vitória (loan) | 11 | (1) |
| 2026 | → Maguary-PE (loan) | 14 | (2) |
- * Club domestic league appearances and goals as of 16:50, 11 November 2026 (UTC)

Renato Henrique Ferreira Silvestre da Silva (born 10 October 1993), known as Renato Henrique, is a Brazilian footballer who plays as an attacking midfielder or a forward for América-PE.

He began his career at Náutico, where he played in the Campeonato Brasileiro Série B. He won the Campeonato Pernambucano with Salgueiro in 2020, the first time the title was taken out of the state capital Recife. In the 2022 edition, with Retrô, he was the top scorer with seven goals for the runners-up. He was also top scorer in Série A2 and Série A3 of the league in 2023 and 2024 respectively, making him the only person to achieve the honour in all three divisions. In 2026, he won the Campeonato Capixaba on loan at Porto Vitória.

== Career ==
=== Early career and Salgueiro ===
Born in Recife in the state of Pernambuco, Renato Henrique began his career at hometown club Naútico, after having been loaned to Palmeiras as a youth. Following moves to Boa and Guarani-SP, he signed for Desportivo Brasil in the Campeonato Paulista Série A3 for 2018.

Renato Henrique returned to his home state in 2019, signing for Salgueiro. He was loaned to Decisão for most of the year, where he won the Campeonato Pernambucano Série A2. In 2020, he helped Salgueiro to the Campeonato Pernambucano, the first team from outside the state capital Recife to win the title; he added eight goals in the year's Campeonato Brasileiro Série D to the three he had scored in the state league.

In January 2021, Renato Henrique moved to Hercílio Luz in the Campeonato Catarinense. He spent the second half of the year between Jacuipense of Campeonato Brasileiro Série C and Castanhal in Série D.

=== Retrô ===
Renato Henrique signed for Retrô in 2022. His team reached the final of the year's Campeonato Pernambucano before losing on penalties to Naútico; had he won, he would have become the first player to win the title twice with teams apart from the Recife-based trio of Naútico, Sport and Santa Cruz since the players of Tramways in 1936 and 1937. He was also the tournament's top scorer with seven goals. In July, he suffered an anterior cruciate ligament injury of the right knee while playing in the national Série D against Globo-RN and was ruled out for eight months.

In October 2023, Renato Henrique renewed his contract with Retrô, while on loan at Vera Cruz in the Campeonato Pernambucano Série A2. In the same month, he scored five goals in a 9–1 win over 1º de Maio; he had previously scored four for Decisão against Vera Cruz in the second tier in 2019. He finished the season as top scorer. In September, his team won the year's Série D title.

=== América-PE ===
Renato Henrique signed for América-PE in October 2024. He won the Campeonato Pernambucano Série A3 that year, in addition to being top scorer with nine goals in five games, making him the first person to be top scorer in three divisions of the state league.

In 2025, Renato Henrique was loaned to Madureira in the Campeonato Carioca and then North, who won the Campeonato Mineiro Módulo II. He finished the year back at América-PE in the Pernambucano A2, scoring his attempt in the penalty shootout loss to Vitória das Tabocas in the final on 1 November.

Renato Henrique was loaned to Porto Vitória for the Campeonato Capixaba at the start of 2026. He scored on his debut on 15 January in a 2–0 home win over Capixaba SC but added no more goals over 11 appearances, as his team won the title. On 3 April, he was loaned to Maguary-PE in Série D. He returned to his parent club in October for the 2026–27 season of the state league, and on 29 October he and teammate Gilvan both scored hat-tricks in a 7–0 win away to Guarany-PE.

== Honours ==
=== Club ===
Decisão

- Campeonato Pernambucano Série A2: 2019

Salgueiro

- Campeonato Pernambucano: 2020

Retrô

- Campeonato Brasileiro Série D: 2024

América-PE

- Campeonato Pernambucano Série A3: 2024

Porto Vitória

- Campeonato Capixaba: 2026

=== Individual ===
- Campeonato Pernambucano top scorer: 2022
- Campeonato Pernambucano Série A2 top scorer: 2023
- Campeonato Pernambucano Série A3 top scorer: 2024
