= Jean Carlos (footballer, born 1992) =

Brazilian footballer

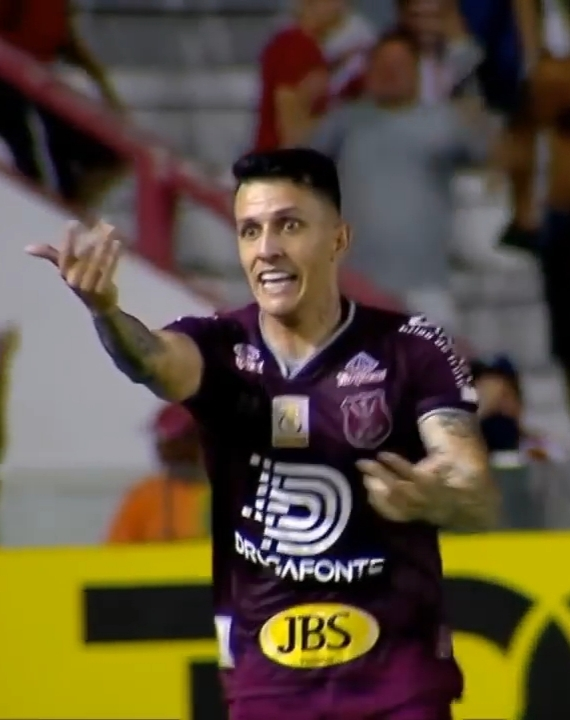
- Jean Carlos playing for Náutico in 2020

Personal information
- Full name: Jean Carlos Vicente
- Date of birth: 15 February 1992 (age 34)
- Place of birth: Cornélio Procópio, Brazil
- Height: 1.78 m (5 ft 10 in)
- Position: Central midfielder

Team information
- Current team: Náutico
- Number: 10

Youth career
- Marília
- 2010–2012: Palmeiras

Senior career*
Years	Team	Apps	(Gls)
2010–2013	Palmeiras B	10	(1)
2010	Palmeiras	3	(0)
2013–2016	São Bernardo	34	(5)
2016	→ Vila Nova (loan)	20	(3)
2016	→ São Paulo (loan)	3	(0)
2017	Goiás	26	(4)
2018	Novorizontino	12	(1)
2019	Coritiba	23	(0)
2019	Mirassol	11	(0)
2019–2022	Náutico	134	(28)
2023	Ceará	44	(5)
2024–2025	Juventude	53	(9)
2025	Criciúma	22	(3)
2026	Chapecoense	29	(4)
2026–	Náutico	18	(3)
- * Club domestic league appearances and goals as of 18 November 2026

Jean Carlos Vicente (born 15 February 1992), or simply Jean Carlos, is a Brazilian professional footballer who plays as a central midfielder for Náutico.

== Career ==
Jean Carlos was revealed in the youth categories of Palmeiras. In 2013, he moved to São Bernardo. In 2016, it was loaned to Vila Nova, to compete in the Campeonato Brasileiro Série B, which was the assists leader of the championship with 8 assists.

On 4 September 2016, he signed with the São Paulo FC on loan until the end of the 2017 Campeonato Paulista, with a purchase option at the end of it.

== Career statistics ==
As of 30 July 2024

Appearances and goals by club, season and competition
Club	Season	League			State league		National cup		Other		Total	
Club	Season	Division	Apps	Goals	Apps	Goals	Apps	Goals	Apps	Goals	Apps	Goals
Palmeiras	2010	Série A	3	0	—		—		—		3	0
Palmeiras	2011	Série A	—		0	0	—		—		0	0
Palmeiras	Total		3	0	0	0	—		—		3	0
Palmeiras B	2011	Paulista	—		3 (Note: Appearance(s) in Campeonato Paulista Série A2)	0	—		—		3	0
Palmeiras B	2013	Paulista	—		7 (Note: Appearance(s) in Campeonato Paulista Série A3)	1	—		—		7	1
Palmeiras B	Total		—		10	1	—		—		10	1
São Bernardo	2013	Paulista	—		2 (Note: Appearance(s) in Campeonato Paulista Série A1)	1	3	0	4 (Note: Appearance(s) in Copa Paulista)	0	9	1
São Bernardo	2014	Paulista	—		8	1	2	1	18	4	28	6
São Bernardo	2015	Paulista	—		10	0	—		12	6	22	6
São Bernardo	2016	Paulista	—		14	3	—		—		14	3
São Bernardo	Total		—		34	5	5	1	34	10	73	16
Villa Nova (loan)	2016	Série B	20	3	—		—		—		20	3
São Paulo (loan)	2016	Série A	3	0	—		—		—		3	0
Goiás	2017	Série B	14	1	12 (Note: Appearance(s) in Campeonato Goiano)	3	3	1	—		29	5
Novorizontino	2018	Série D	—		12	1	—		—		12	1
Coritiba	2018	Série B	23	0	—		—		—		23	0
Mirassol	2019	Paulista	—		11	0	—		—		11	0
Náutico	2019	Série C	11	2	—		—		—		11	2
Náutico	2020	Série B	35	7	5 (Note: Appearance(s) in Campeonato Pernambucano Série A1)	1	2	2	7 (Note: Appearance(s) in Copa do Nordeste)	3	49	13
Náutico	2021	Série B	34	11	11	2	—		—		45	13
Náutico	2022	Série B	29	3	9	2	1	0	7	3	46	8
Náutico	Total		109	23	25	5	3	2	14	6	151	36
Ceará	2023	Série B	36	3	8 (Note: Appearance(s) in Campeonato Cearense Série A)	2	2	0	7	2	53	7
Juventude	2024	Série A	13	4	16 (Note: Appearance(s) in Campeonato Gaúcho de Futebol Série A)	2	4	0	—		33	6
Career total			221	34	118	19	17	4	55	18	411	75

== Honours ==
Goiás

- Campeonato Goiano: 2017

Náutico

- Campeonato Brasileiro Série C: 2019
- Campeonato Pernambucano: 2021, 2022

Ceará

- Copa do Nordeste: 2023
