= Hereda =

Brazilian footballer (born 1998)

Personal information
- Full name: Diogo Hereda da Silva
- Date of birth: 20 September 1998 (age 28)
- Place of birth: Camaçari, Brazil
- Height: 1.78 m (5 ft 10 in)
- Position: Right-back

Team information
- Current team: CRB
- Number: 32

Youth career
- 2011–2013: Cruzeiro
- 2014–2016: Fluminense
- 2016: Vasco da Gama
- 2017–2018: Náutico

Senior career*
Years	Team	Apps	(Gls)
2018–2022	Náutico	119	(2)
2023–	CRB	115	(6)
2025	→ Sport Recife (loan)	17	(0)
- * Club domestic league appearances and goals as of 16 November 2026

Diogo Hereda da Silva (born 20 September 1998), commonly known as Hereda, is a Brazilian professional footballer who plays as a right-back for CRB

== Career ==
Born in Camaçari, Bahia, Hereda joined Cruzeiro's youth setup at the age of 12. After leaving the club in 2013, he subsequently represented Fluminense before joining Vasco da Gama on 4 February 2016.

In 2017, after losing his space at Vasco, Hereda moved to Náutico and was assigned to the under-20 squad. Promoted to the first team in the following year, he suffered a serious knee injury which sidelined him for the remainder of the season.

Fully recovered for the 2019 campaign, Hereda made his senior debut on 15 January 2019, starting in a 3–1 home loss to Fortaleza, for the year's Copa do Nordeste. He was a regular starter during the year, as the club achieved promotion to the Série B as champions; on 12 July 2019, he renewed his contract until 2022.

A regular starter for Timbu in the following years, Hereda suffered a knee injury in May 2022, fully recovering in November but opting to leave the club.

On 16 November 2022, Hereda was announced at CRB. On 8 December 2023, after being a regular starter during the year, he renewed his contract until 2024.

== Career statistics ==
As of 7 February 2024

Club	Season	League			State League		Cup		Continental		Other		Total	
Club	Season	Division	Apps	Goals	Apps	Goals	Apps	Goals	Apps	Goals	Apps	Goals	Apps	Goals
Náutico	2019	Série C	21	0	10	1	0	0	—		9 (Note: Appearance(s) in Copa do Nordeste)	1	40	2
Náutico	2020	Série B	33	1	6	0	1	0	—		5	0	45	1
Náutico	2021	Série B	26	0	10	0	—		—		—		36	0
Náutico	2022	Série B	3	0	10	0	1	0	—		9	0	23	0
Náutico	Subtotal		83	1	36	1	2	0	—		23	1	144	3
CRB	2023	Série B	28	0	7	0	2	0	—		4	0	41	0
CRB	2024	Série B	0	0	3	0	0	0	—		1	0	4	0
CRB	Subtotal		28	0	10	0	2	0	—		5	0	45	0
Career total			111	1	46	1	4	0	0	0	28	1	189	3

== Honours ==
Náutico

- Campeonato Brasileiro Série C: 2019
- Campeonato Pernambucano: 2021, 2022

CRB

- Campeonato Alagoano: 2023
