= Caio Dantas (footballer, born 1993) =

Brazilian footballer (born 1993)

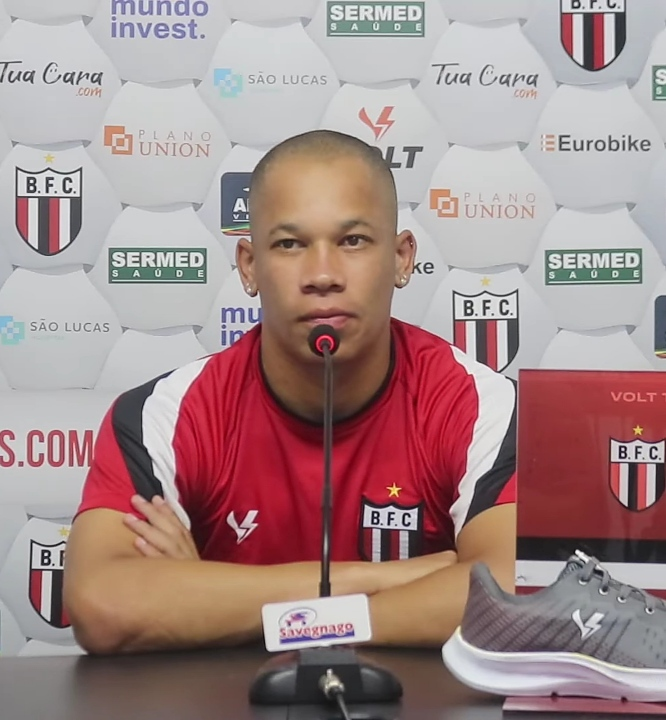
- Caio Dantas in 2022

Personal information
- Full name: Caio Henrique da Silva Dantas
- Date of birth: 19 February 1993 (age 33)
- Place of birth: Santos, Brazil
- Height: 1.77 m (5 ft 9 1/2 in)
- Position: Forward

Team information
- Current team: Operário Ferroviário
- Number: 99

Youth career
- Palmeiras

Senior career*
Years	Team	Apps	(Gls)
2012–2013	Osasco Audax	15	(5)
2014	América Mineiro	5	(0)
2015	Red Bull Brasil	7	(1)
2016–2018	Coimbra	14	(3)
2016	→ Uberlândia (loan)	8	(1)
2016	→ Água Santa (loan)	8	(0)
2017	→ Uberlândia (loan)	4	(1)
2018	→ Botafogo-SP (loan)	21	(11)
2019	Cuiabá	18	(8)
2020	Boavista	12	(7)
2020–2024	Água Santa	9	(0)
2020	→ Sampaio Corrêa (loan)	36	(17)
2021	→ Guangzhou City (loan)	0	(0)
2021	→ Náutico (loan)	10	(5)
2022	→ Criciúma (loan)	30	(3)
2023	→ Botafogo-SP (loan)	11	(0)
2023	→ Vila Nova (loan)	32	(10)
2024	→ Vitória (loan)	7	(1)
2024	Guarani	35	(11)
2025	Atlético Goianiense	21	(5)
2025–2026	Novorizontino	10	(0)
2026–	Operário Ferroviário	32	(5)
- * Club domestic league appearances and goals as of 18 November 2026

Caio Henrique da Silva Dantas (born 19 February 1993), known as Caio Dantas, is a Brazilian footballer who plays as a forward for Operário Ferroviário.

== Club career ==
Caio Dantas was top scorer in the 2020 Campeonato Brasileiro Série B whilst playing for Sampaio Corrêa. As a result of standing out in the division, he secured a contract for 2021 in the Chinese Super League with Guangzhou City.

== Career statistics ==
As of 3 November 2024.

Club	Season	League			State League		Cup		Continental		Other		Total	
Club	Season	Division	Apps	Goals	Apps	Goals	Apps	Goals	Apps	Goals	Apps	Goals	Apps	Goals
Osasco Audax	2012	Paulista A2	—		0	0	—		—		17 (Note: Appearance(s) in Copa Paulista)	5	17	5
Osasco Audax	2013	Paulista A2	—		15	5	—		—		21	3	36	8
Osasco Audax	Total		—		15	5	—		—		38	8	53	13
América Mineiro	2014	Série B	0	0	5	0	1	0	—		—		6	0
Red Bull Brasil	2015	Série D	7	1	0	0	—		—		—		7	1
Uberlândia (loan)	2016	Mineiro	—		8	1	—		—		—		8	1
Água Santa (loan)	2016	Paulista	—		0	0	—		—		8	0	8	0
Uberlândia (loan)	2017	Mineiro	—		4	1	—		—		—		4	1
Coimbra	2017	Mineiro Módulo II	—		14	3	—		—		—		14	3
Botafogo-SP (loan)	2018	Série C	21	11	0	0	—		—		—		21	11
Cuiabá	2019	Série B	8	0	10	8	2	0	—		3 (Note: Appearance(s) in Copa Verde)	2	23	10
Boavista	2020	Carioca	—		11	7	1	0	—		—		12	7
Água Santa (loan)	2020	Paulista	—		1	0	—		—		—		1	0
Sampaio Corrêa (loan)	2020	Série B	33	17	—		—		—		—		33	17
Náutico (loan)	2021	Série B	10	5	—		—		—		—		10	5
Água Santa	2022	Paulista	—		8	0	—		—		—		8	0
Criciúma (loan)	2022	Série B	25	2	5	1	—		—		—		30	3
Botafogo-SP (loan)	2023	Série B	0	0	9	0	2	0	—		—		11	0
Vila Nova (loan)	2023	Série B	32	10	—		—		—		—		32	10
Vitória (loan)	2024	Série A	0	0	7	1	0	0	—		2 (Note: Appearance(s) in Copa do Nordeste)	0	9	1
Guarani	2024	Série B	32	11	0	0	0	0	—		0	0	32	11
Career total			158	57	97	27	6	0	0	0	51	10	322	94

== Honours ==
Cuiabá

- Campeonato Mato-Grossense: 2019
- Copa Verde: 2019

Criciúma

- Campeonato Catarinense Série B: 2022

Vitória

- Campeonato Baiano: 2024
