= Vinícius (footballer, born 1993) =

Brazilian footballer

Personal information
- Full name: Vinícius Santos Silva
- Date of birth: August 3, 1993 (age 33)
- Place of birth: São Paulo, Brazil
- Height: 1.80 m (5 ft 11 in)
- Position: Winger

Team information
- Current team: Náutico
- Number: 7

Youth career
- 2007–2013: Palmeiras

Senior career*
Years	Team	Apps	(Gls)
2010–2017	Palmeiras	57	(6)
2014	→ Vitória (loan)	18	(1)
2015	→ Capivariano (loan)	10	(1)
2015	→ Ceará (loan)	10	(0)
2016	→ Coritiba (loan)	33	(2)
2017–2018	Adanaspor	20	(1)
2018	Chapecoense	16	(1)
2019–2020	Criciúma	37	(1)
2020	AE Larisa	14	(0)
2020–2021	Náutico	57	(14)
2022	Bahia	0	(0)
2022	→ Goiás (loan)	13	(4)
2022–2025	Goiás	70	(7)
2024	→ América MG (loan)	13	(0)
2025–	Náutico	56	(14)

International career
	Brazil U23	1	(0)
- * Club domestic league appearances and goals as of 18 November 2026

Vinícius Santos Silva (born 3 August 1993), known as Vinícius, is a Brazilian professional footballer who plays as a winger for Náutico.

== Honours ==
Palmeiras

- Copa do Brasil: 2012
- Campeonato Brasileiro Série B: 2013

Náutico

- Campeonato Pernambucano: 2021

Goiás

- Copa Verde: 2023
