= Vitinho (footballer, born December 2000) =

Brazilian footballer

Personal information
- Full name: Victor Julio Alves de Paula
- Date of birth: 26 December 2000 (age 25)
- Place of birth: Recife, Brazil
- Height: 1.77 m (5 ft 10 in)
- Position: Attacking midfielder

Team information
- Current team: Hercílio Luz

Youth career
- Adesppe
- Sport Recife
- Ferroviário do Cabo
- 2018–2020: Flamengo-SP

Senior career*
Years	Team	Apps	(Gls)
2019–2020	Flamengo-SP	10	(1)
2021–2022	Vera Cruz	9	(1)
2021–2022	→ Hercílio Luz (loan)	12	(1)
2022–	Hercílio Luz	2	(1)
2022–2023	→ Avaí (loan)	18	(0)
- * Club domestic league appearances and goals as of 5 August 2023

Victor Julio Alves de Paula (born 26 December 2000), commonly known as Vitinho, is a Brazilian footballer who plays as an attacking midfielder for Hercílio Luz.

== Club career ==
Born in Recife, Pernambuco, Vitinho started his career playing for a social project named Associação Desportiva de Pernambuco (Adesppe) before joining Sport Recife's youth setup at the age of 13. He subsequently represented Ferroviário do Cabo before moving to Flamengo-SP in 2018.

Vitinho made his senior debut with Flamengo in the 2019 Campeonato Paulista Segunda Divisão, before returning to the under-20 side in 2020. On 19 January 2021, he joined Vera Cruz.

Vitinho moved to Hercílio Luz on loan for the 2021 Copa Santa Catarina, but remained for the 2022 Campeonato Catarinense, and was bought outright by the club on 11 April 2022. Four days later, he was announced at Série A side Avaí, on loan until December 2024.

Vitinho made his debut in the top tier of Brazilian football on 22 May 2022, coming on as a late substitute for Dentinho in a 1–2 away loss against Athletico Paranaense.

== Career statistics ==
As of 1 June 2023

Club	Season	League			State League		Cup		Continental		Other		Total	
Club	Season	Division	Apps	Goals	Apps	Goals	Apps	Goals	Apps	Goals	Apps	Goals	Apps	Goals
Flamengo-SP	2019	Paulista 2ª Divisão	—		10	1	—		—		—		10	1
Vera Cruz	2021	Pernambucano	—		9	1	—		—		—		9	1
Hercílio Luz	2021	Catarinense	—		0	0	—		—		8 (Note: Appearance(s) in Copa Santa Catarina)	1	8	1
Hercílio Luz	2022	Catarinense	—		12	1	—		—		—		12	1
Hercílio Luz	Total		—		12	1	—		—		8	1	20	2
Avaí	2022	Série A	8	0	—		—		—		—		8	0
Avaí	2023	Série B	4	0	3	0	1	0	—		—		8	0
Avaí	Total		12	0	3	0	1	0	—		—		16	0
Career total			12	0	34	3	1	0	0	0	8	1	55	4
