= Alex Alves (footballer, born 1986) =

Brazilian footballer

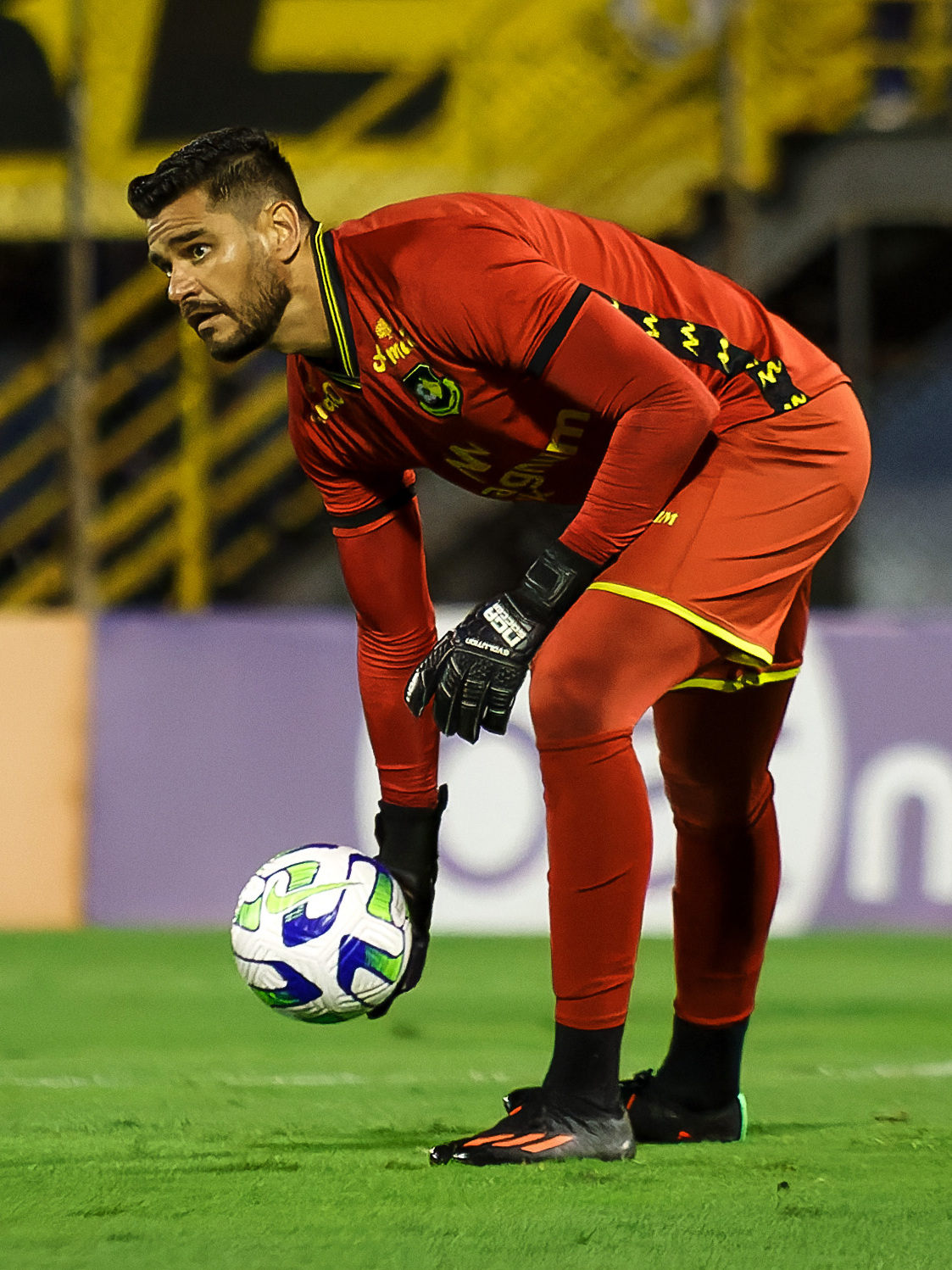
- Alex Alves in 2023

Personal information
- Full name: Alex Alves de Lima
- Date of birth: 8 November 1986 (age 40)
- Place of birth: Araçatuba, Brazil
- Height: 1.89 m (6 ft 2 in)
- Position: Goalkeeper

Team information
- Current team: São Bernardo
- Number: 1

Youth career
- 2001–2005: Ituano

Senior career*
Years	Team	Apps	(Gls)
2006–2008	Sertãozinho		
2008	Atlético Goianiense		
2009	Santa Cruz-RS		
2010–2014	Mogi Mirim	27	(0)
2010–2011	→ Trofense (loan)	10	(0)
2011	→ Marília (loan)		
2011	→ ABC (loan)	0	(0)
2014	Santa Cruz	0	(0)
2014–2015	São Bento	0	(0)
2015	Campinense	0	(0)
2015–2016	XV de Piracicaba		
2017	Altos	8	(0)
2017–2018	Sampaio Corrêa	22	(0)
2018–2019	Bragantino	54	(0)
2020	Red Bull Bragantino	0	(0)
2021	Náutico	35	(0)
2022–	São Bernardo	157	(0)
- * Club domestic league appearances and goals as of 18 November 2026

Alex Alves de Lima (born 8 November 1986), known as Alex Alves, is a Brazilian footballer who plays as a goalkeeper for São Bernardo.

== Career ==
Alex Alves has spent his most of his career to date in Brazil. He spent his youth career with Ituano. His professional career began with Sertãozinho, he spent two years with Sertãozinho before leaving to join Atlético Goianiense. Following a short stint with the aforementioned club, he left to sign for Santa Cruz. He stayed with the Rio Grande do Sul based team before going on the move again, this time joining Mogi Mirim. He spent four years at Mogi Mirim, making 28 appearances despite leaving the club three times on loan during that time.

His first loan was to Portuguese club Trofense, he made 13 appearances in all competitions in what was his first spell outside of Brazil before returning to Mogi Mirim. Next came loans to Marília and ABC respectively, he failed to register a league appearance for the latter but did play 10 times for the former. In 2014, Alves left Mogi Mirim and agreed to join Santa Cruz of Pernambuco.

He was named on Santa Cruz's substitutes bench nine times but didn't make an appearance before leaving. Then came moves to three clubs in two seasons, but Alves again found playing time extremely limited as he did not make a single appearance for either São Bento, Campinense or Piracicaba. He left the latter on 12 April 2016.

At the start of 2017 he was part of the Altos participating in 2017 Copa do Nordeste and 2017 Copa do Brasil, but new Sampaio Corrêa coach Francisco Diá specifically requested him for the team, so he transferred at the end of February. He moved to Bragantino at the end of the season, initially contracting just for the 2018 Campeonato Paulista season, but later signing a deal until the end of 2020. He became part of the Red Bull Bragantino squad when CA Bragantino merged with Red Bull Brasil in April 2019.

== Honours ==
Atlético Goianiense

- Campeonato Brasileiro Série C (1): 2008

ABC

- Campeonato Potiguar (1): 2011

Mogi Mirim

- Campeonato Paulista do Interior (1): 2012

Sampaio Corrêa

- Campeonato Maranhense (1): 2017

Náutico

- Campeonato Pernambucano (1): 2021
