= Júnior Tavares =

Brazilian footballer

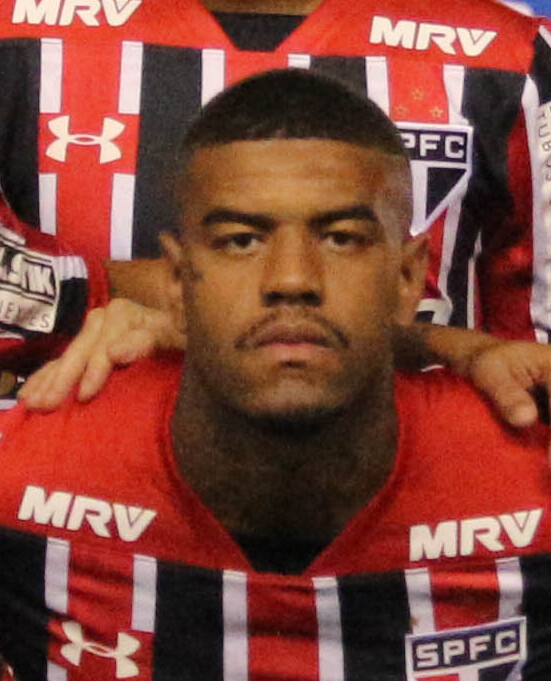
- Júnior Tavares with São Paulo in 2017

Personal information
- Full name: Carlos Eugenio Júnior Tavares dos Santos
- Date of birth: 7 August 1996 (age 30)
- Place of birth: Porto Alegre, Brazil
- Height: 1.78 m (5 ft 10 in)
- Positions: Left-back; defensive midfielder

Team information
- Current team: Omonia Aradippou
- Number: 12

Youth career
- 2008–2009: Internacional
- 2010–2011: Sporting Sul
- 2011–2015: Grêmio
- 2016: → São Paulo (loan)

Senior career*
| Years | Team | Apps | (Gls) |
| 2015–2016 | Grêmio | 11 | (0) |
| 2016 | → Joinville (loan) | 8 | (0) |
| 2017–2021 | São Paulo | 50 | (0) |
| 2018–2019 | → Sampdoria (loan) | 3 | (0) |
| 2019–2020 | → Portimonense (loan) | 18 | (1) |
| 2020–2021 | → Sport Recife (loan) | 35 | (0) |
| 2021–2022 | Náutico | 54 | (3) |
| 2023 | Ponte Preta | 16 | (0) |
| 2024– | Omonia Aradippou | 6 | (1) |
- * Club domestic league appearances and goals as of 30 January 2025

Carlos Eugenio Júnior Tavares dos Santos (born 7 August 1996), known as Júnior Tavares, is a Brazilian professional footballer who plays as a left-back and defensive midfielder for Cypriot First Division club Omonia Aradippou.

== Career ==
In 2016, Tavares was loaned to São Paulo, where he played several championships for the under 20 team. After standing out, it was bought in definitive and was promoted to the professional team of São Paulo.

On 16 July 2018, Tavares signed to Serie A side Sampdoria on loan until 30 June 2019 with an option to buy.

In September 2023, the athlete underwent surgery to remove a brain tumor. After almost a year away from football, he returned to his career in August 2024, representing Omonia Aradippou.

== Career statistics ==
As of match played 1 July 2019

Appearances and goals by club, season and competition
| Club | Season | League | | Cup | | Continental | | Other | | Total | |
| Club | Season | Apps | Goals | Apps | Goals | Apps | Goals | Apps | Goals | Apps | Goals |
|---|---|---|---|---|---|---|---|---|---|---|---|
| Grêmio | 2014 | 0 | 0 | 0 | 0 | 0 | 0 | 0 | 0 | 0 | 0 |
| Grêmio | 2015 | 2 | 0 | 1 | 0 | 0 | 0 | 8 | 0 | 11 | 0 |
| Grêmio | Total | 2 | 0 | 1 | 0 | 0 | 0 | 8 | 0 | 11 | 0 |
| Joinville (loan) | 2015 | 7 | 0 | 1 | 0 | 0 | 0 | 0 | 0 | 8 | 0 |
| São Paulo | 2016 | 0 | 0 | 7 | 0 | 0 | 0 | 0 | 0 | 7 | 0 |
| São Paulo | 2017 | 23 | 0 | 6 | 0 | 2 | 0 | 14 | 0 | 45 | 0 |
| São Paulo | 2018 | 1 | 0 | 1 | 0 | 0 | 0 | 3 | 0 | 5 | 0 |
| São Paulo | Total | 24 | 0 | 14 | 0 | 2 | 0 | 17 | 0 | 57 | 0 |
| Sampdoria (loan) | 2018–19 | 3 | 0 | 0 | 0 | 0 | 0 | 0 | 0 | 3 | 0 |
| Career total | | 36 | 0 | 16 | 0 | 2 | 0 | 25 | 0 | 79 | 0 |

== Honours ==
Náutico

- Campeonato Pernambucano: 2022

Brazil U15

- South American U-15 Championship: 2011

Individual

- Campeonato Pernambucano Best XI: 2022
