= Rhaldney =

Brazilian footballer

Personal information
- Full name: Rhaldney Norberto Simião Gomes
- Date of birth: 20 November 1998 (age 27)
- Place of birth: Recife, Brazil
- Height: 1.84 m (6 ft 0 in)
- Position: Midfielder

Team information
- Current team: Göztepe
- Number: 5

Youth career
- 2011–2019: Náutico

Senior career*
Years	Team	Apps	(Gls)
2019–2022	Náutico	100	(3)
2022–2025	Atlético Goianiense	57	(3)
2025–	Göztepe	26	(2)
2026	→ Alverca (loan)	14	(1)
- * Club domestic league appearances and goals as of 18 October 2026

Rhaldney Norberto Simião Gomes (born 20 November 1998), simply known as Rhaldney, is a Brazilian footballer who plays as a midfielder for Turkish Süper Lig club Göztepe.

== Club career ==
=== Náutico ===
Born in Recife, Pernambuco, Rhaldney joined Náutico's youth setup at the age of 13. He made his first team debut on 22 January 2019, starting in a 2–0 away win over Sergipe, for the year's Copa do Nordeste.

After only two first team appearances during the season, as the club achieved promotion to the Série B, Rhaldney was definitely promoted to the main squad for the 2020 campaign. On 25 April 2020, he renewed his contract with the club.

Rhaldney scored his first professional goal on 12 September 2020, netting his team's third in a 3–1 home win over Botafogo-SP.

=== Atlético Goianiense ===
On 11 July 2022, Náutico announced the transfer of Rhaldney to Série A side Atlético Goianiense, for a rumoured fee of R$ 1 million.

=== Göztepe ===
In July 2025, Rhaldney signed with Turkish club Göztepe.

==== Alverca (loan) ====
On 3 February 2026, Rhaldney was loaned to Liga Portugal club Alverca until the end of the season.

== Career statistics ==
As of 3 February 2026

Club	Season	League			State League		Cup (Note: includes Copa do Brasil, Turkish Cup)		Continental		Other		Total	
Club	Season	Division	Apps	Goals	Apps	Goals	Apps	Goals	Apps	Goals	Apps	Goals	Apps	Goals
Náutico	2019	Série C	1	0	0	0	1	0	—		1 (Note: Appearance(s) in Copa do Nordeste)	0	3	0
Náutico	2020	Série B	32	1	7	0	2	0	—		7	0	48	1
Náutico	2021	Série B	32	1	11	1	—		—		—		43	2
Náutico	2022	Série B	10	0	7	0	1	0	—		8	1	26	1
Náutico	Total		75	2	25	1	4	0	—		16	1	120	4
Atlético Goianiense	2022	Série A	7	0	—		—		1 (Note: Appearance in Copa Sudamericana)	0	—		8	0
Atlético Goianiense	2023	Série B	36	2	14	1	2	0	—		—		52	3
Atlético Goianiense	2024	Série A	32	0	15	0	6	1	—		—		53	1
Atlético Goianiense	2025	Série B	13	0	12	2	2	0	—		—		27	2
Atlético Goianiense	Total		88	2	41	3	10	1	1	0	—		140	6
Göztepe	2025–26	Süper Lig	18	1	—		1	0	—		—		19	1
Alverca (loan)	2025–26	Primeira Liga	0	0	—		0	0	—		—		0	0
Career total			181	5	66	4	15	1	1	0	16	1	279	11

== Honours ==
Náutico

- Campeonato Brasileiro Série C: 2019
- Campeonato Pernambucano: 2021, 2022
