= Alencar (footballer, born 2002) =

Brazilian footballer

Personal information
- Full name: Rodrigo Souza Santos
- Date of birth: 7 August 2002 (age 24)
- Place of birth: Itabuna, Brazil
- Height: 1.78 m (5 ft 10 in)
- Position: Midfielder

Team information
- Current team: Ferroviária
- Number: 8

Youth career
- Barra
- –2020: Retrô

Senior career*
| Years | Team | Apps | (Gls) |
| 2020–2024 | Retrô | 73 | (2) |
| 2021 | → Flamengo (loan) | 0 | (0) |
| 2023 | → Paysandu (loan) | 4 | (0) |
| 2025– | Ferroviária | 60 | (2) |
- * Club domestic league appearances and goals as of 9 November 2026

Rodrigo Souza Santos (born 7 August 2002), commonly known as Alencar, is a Brazilian footballer who currently plays as a midfielder for Ferroviária.

== Career ==
Born in Itabuna in the state of Bahia, Alencar began his career with Associação Desportiva Barra, before joining Retrô, where he was named the best midfielder in the Pernambuco Under-20 Championship in 2020. These impressive performances at youth level prompted Série A side Flamengo to sign him on loan for the entirety of the 2021 season.

After turning professional with Retrô the following season, Alencar was loaned to Série C side Paysandu in August 2023. Despite initially being thrust into the first team, he only managed four appearances for Paysandu after suffering an injury, before returning to Retrô.

== Style of play ==
A defensive midfielder, Alencar describes himself as an "intense" player in both marking and attacking, stating that he likes to "play freely".

== Career statistics ==
=== Club ===
As of 9 October 2024.

Appearances and goals by club, season and competition
| Club | Season | League | | | State League | | Cup | | Other | | Total | |
| Club | Season | Division | Apps | Goals | Apps | Goals | Apps | Goals | Apps | Goals | Apps | Goals |
|---|---|---|---|---|---|---|---|---|---|---|---|---|
| Retrô | 2020 | – | | | 2 (Note: Appearances in the Campeonato Pernambucano) | 0 | 0 | 0 | 0 | 0 | 2 | 0 |
| Retrô | 2021 | Série D | 0 | 0 | 0 | 0 | 0 | 0 | 0 | 0 | 0 | 0 |
| Retrô | 2022 | Série D | 9 | 0 | 3 | 0 | 0 | 0 | 0 | 0 | 12 | 0 |
| Retrô | 2023 | Série D | 17 | 0 | 11 | 0 | 2 (Note: Appearances in the Copa do Brasil) | 0 | 1 (Note: Appearances in the Copa do Nordeste) | 0 | 31 | 0 |
| Retrô | 2024 | Série D | 22 | 2 | 9 | 0 | 2 | 0 | 2 | 0 | 35 | 2 |
| Retrô | Total | | 48 | 2 | 25 | 0 | 4 | 0 | 3 | 0 | 80 | 2 |
| Flamengo (loan) | 2021 | Série A | 0 | 0 | 0 | 0 | 0 | 0 | 0 | 0 | 0 | 0 |
| Paysandu (loan) | 2023 | Série C | 4 | 0 | 0 | 0 | 0 | 0 | 0 | 0 | 4 | 0 |
| Career total | | | 52 | 2 | 25 | 0 | 4 | 0 | 3 | 0 | 84 | 2 |

== Honours ==
Retrô

- Campeonato Brasileiro Série D: 2024
