= Bruno Ferreira (footballer, born March 1994) =

Brazilian footballer

Personal information
- Full name: Bruno Ferreira Ventura Diniz
- Date of birth: 16 March 1994 (age 32)
- Place of birth: Limeira, São Paulo, Brazil
- Height: 1.97 m (6 ft 6 in)
- Position: Goalkeeper

Team information
- Current team: Avaí
- Number: 94

Youth career
- 2011–2013: Bahia
- 2013–2017: Náutico

Senior career*
Years	Team	Apps	(Gls)
2015–2022	Náutico	75	(0)
2016	→ Santa Cruz-RN (loan)	1	(0)
2019–2020	→ Gil Vicente (loan)	0	(0)
2020–2021	→ Vilafranquense (loan)	2	(0)
2023	Caxias	15	(0)
2023–2026	Ceará	72	(0)
2026–	Avaí	16	(0)
- * Club domestic league appearances and goals as of 18 November 2026

Bruno Ferreira Ventura Diniz (born 16 March 1994) is a Brazilian professional footballer who plays as a goalkeeper for Avaí.

== Career ==
Bruno made his professional debut with Náutico in a 3–0 Campeonato Brasileiro Série B loss to Luverdense Esporte Clube on 25 November 2017. On 27 June 2019, Bruno signed with Gil Vicente on loan.

== Honours ==
Ceará

- Campeonato Cearense: 2024, 2025
