= Kauê (footballer, born 1995) =

Brazilian association football player

Personal information
- Full name: Kauê da Silva
- Date of birth: 11 February 1995 (age 31)
- Place of birth: São Caetano do Sul, Brazil
- Height: 1.86 m (6 ft 1 in)
- Position: Midfielder

Team information
- Current team: Serra

Senior career*
| Years | Team | Apps | (Gls) |
| 2017 | Uberaba | 0 | (0) |
| 2017 | Ipatinga | 0 | (0) |
| 2018–2019 | Guarani-MG | 0 | (0) |
| 2018 | → Coimbra | 0 | (0) |
| 2019–2021 | Coimbra | 15 | (0) |
| 2019 | → Atlético Goianiense (loan) | 1 | (0) |
| 2020 | → Athletic (loan) | | |
| 2021 | → Villa Nova (loan) | | |
| 2021–2022 | Retrô | 4 | (0) |
| 2022 | Nacional de Muriaé | | |
| 2022–2023 | Caldense | 5 | (0) |
| 2023 | União Luziense | | |
| 2023– | Serra | | |
- * Club domestic league appearances and goals as of 2 April 2023

Kauê da Silva, commonly known as Kauê, is a Brazilian footballer who plays as a midfielder for Serra.

== Career ==
Kauê spent his early career playing the lower divisions of Campeonato Mineiro, representing Uberaba, Ipatinga, Guarani-MG and Coimbra. In 2019 he helped Coimbra to become champion of the Campeonato Mineiro Módulo II, and earned himself a loan to Atlético Goianiense until the end of the 2019 Campeonato Brasileiro Série B season.

He made his national league debut in the Série B game against Cuiabá on 11 June 2019, coming on as a last minute substitute in the 1–0 win.
