= Guillermo Paiva =

Paraguayan footballer

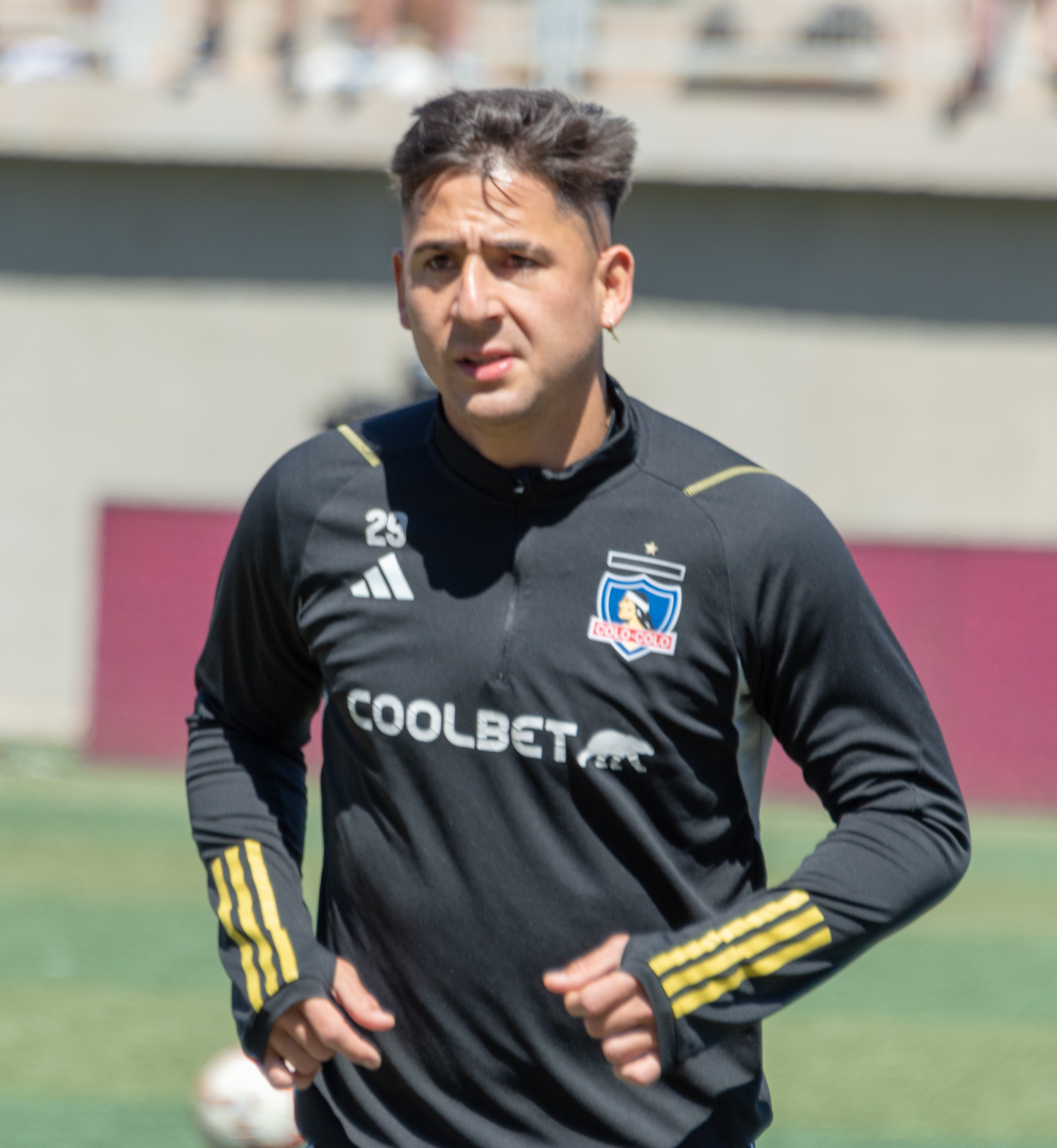

Personal information
- Full name: Guillermo Miguel Paiva Ayala
- Date of birth: 17 August 1997 (age 29)
- Place of birth: Presidente Franco, Paraguay
- Height: 1.81 m (5 ft 11 in)
- Position: Striker

Team information
- Current team: Atlético Junior
- Number: 9

Youth career
- 3 de Febrero
- 2017–2018: Olimpia

Senior career*
Years	Team	Apps	(Gls)
2016	3 de Febrero		
2018–2024	Olimpia	77	(20)
2019	→ Zamora (loan)	13	(3)
2020	→ Náutico (loan)	23	(3)
2021	→ Náutico (loan)	27	(4)
2024	→ Colo-Colo (loan)	24	(2)
2025–	Atlético Junior	26	(7)

International career
2016–2017	Paraguay U20	6	(1)
- * Club domestic league appearances and goals as of 19 July 2025

Guillermo Miguel Paiva Ayala (born 17 August 1997) is a Paraguayan professional footballer who plays as a striker for Colombian club Junior on loan from Olimpia.

== Club career ==
A product of 3 de Febrero, Paiva made his debut with them in 2016 and switched to Olimpia in February 2017. He made his debut in the top division with Olimpia in a 0–1 loss against Deportivo Santaní on 29 July 2018. He was loaned out to Venezuelan club Zamora in 2019 and two times to Brazilian club Náutico in 2020 and 2021.

In 2024, he was loaned out to Chilean club Colo-Colo on a one-year deal with an option to buy.

== International career ==
Paiva represented Paraguay at under-20 level in the 2017 South American Championship. Previously, he represented them in friendly matches against Chile and Peru.
