= Bryan (footballer, born 1996) =

Brazilian footballer

Personal information
- Full name: Bryan Borges Mascarenhas
- Date of birth: 3 August 1996 (age 30)
- Place of birth: Salvador, Bahia, Brazil
- Height: 1.76 m (5 ft 9 1/2 in)
- Positions: Right back; attacking midfielder

Team information
- Current team: Ceará
- Number: 31

Youth career
- União Suzano
- –2013: Guarani-VA
- 2013–2016: Juventude
- 2016–2017: Chapecoense

Senior career*
Years	Team	Apps	(Gls)
2016–2019	Chapecoense	12	(1)
2016	→ Concórdia (loan)	11	(1)
2018	→ Náutico (loan)	9	(1)
2020–2023	Náutico	72	(4)
2023	→ Novorizontino (loan)	1	(0)
2024–2025	Paysandu	67	(4)
2026	Ponte Preta	8	(1)
2026–	Ceará	14	(0)
- * Club domestic league appearances and goals as of 18 November 2026

Bryan Borges Mascarenhas (born 3 August 1996), simply known as Bryan, is a Brazilian footballer who plays for Ceará. Mainly an attacking midfielder, he can also play as a right back.

== Career statistics ==
=== Club ===
As of 28 March 2019.

Club	Season	League			State League		Cup		Continental		Other		Total	
Club	Season	Division	Apps	Goals	Apps	Goals	Apps	Goals	Apps	Goals	Apps	Goals	Apps	Goals
Chapecoense	2017	Série A	0	0	0	0	0	0	0	0	1 (Note: Appearances in the Primeira Liga)	0	1	0
Chapecoense	2018	Série A	0	0	0	0	0	0	0	0	0	0	0	0
Chapecoense	2019	Série A	0	0	2 (Note: Appearances in the Campeonato Catarinense)	1	0	0	0	0	0	0	2	1
Chapecoense	Total		0	0	2	1	0	0	0	0	1	0	3	1
Náutico (loan)	2018	Série C	9	1	2 (Note: Appearances in the Campeonato Pernambucano)	0	1 (Note: Appearances in the Copa do Brasil)	0	0	0	1 (Note: Appearances in the Copa do Nordeste)	0	13	1
Career total			9	1	4	1	1	0	0	0	2	0	16	2

== Honours ==
Náutico

- Campeonato Pernambucano: 2018, 2021, 2022

Paysandu

- Campeonato Paraense: 2024
- Copa Verde: 2024, 2025
- Supercopa Grão-Pará: 2025
