= Kieza =

Brazilian footballer (born 1986)

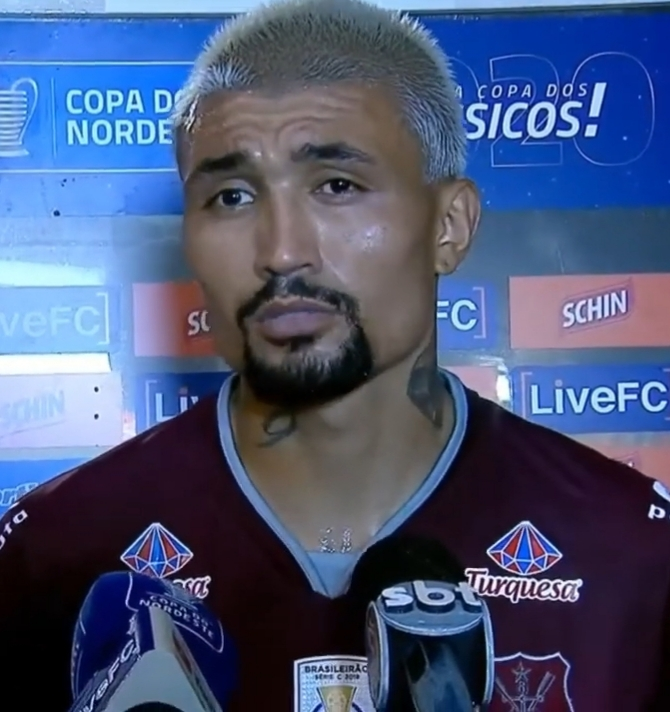

Personal information
- Full name: Welker Marçal Almeida
- Date of birth: 24 September 1986 (age 40)
- Place of birth: Vitória, Brazil
- Height: 1.80 m (5 ft 11 in)
- Position: Striker

Team information
- Current team: Rio Branco

Youth career
- 2003–2006: Serra

Senior career*
| Years | Team | Apps | (Gls) |
| 2007–2008 | Serra | | |
| 2008–2009 | Desportiva | | |
| 2009 | Americano | 19 | (8) |
| 2009 | Fluminense | 20 | (6) |
| 2010–2011 | Cruzeiro | 5 | (2) |
| 2010 | → Ponte Preta (loan) | 7 | (1) |
| 2011 | → Náutico (loan) | 44 | (26) |
| 2012 | → Al Shabab (loan) | 19 | (7) |
| 2012–2013 | → Náutico (loan) | 23 | (16) |
| 2013–2015 | Shanghai Shenxin | 34 | (13) |
| 2014–2015 | → Bahia (loan) | 55 | (28) |
| 2016 | São Paulo | 1 | (0) |
| 2016–2018 | Vitória | 60 | (19) |
| 2018–2020 | Botafogo | 42 | (11) |
| 2019 | → Fortaleza (loan) | 24 | (1) |
| 2020–2022 | Náutico | 76 | (23) |
| 2023 | Brasiliense | 2 | (0) |
| 2023 | Floresta | 6 | (0) |
| 2024– | Rio Branco | 0 | (0) |
- * Club domestic league appearances and goals as of 17 December 2023 (UTC)

Welker Marçal de Almeida (born 24 September 1986), commonly known as Kieza, is a Brazilian professional footballer who plays for Rio Branco as a striker.

== Career ==
Born in Vitória, he was signed on February 20, 2010 by Cruzeiro Esporte Clube who ended his contract in January 2010 with Fluminense.

In 2011, Kieza moved from Cruzeiro to Campeonato Brasileiro Série B side Náutico on a season-long loan deal. He helped Náutico being promoted to the Série A, scoring 21 goals in the season which allowed him to become Top goalscorer of this tournament.

=== Botafogo ===
In April 2019, he joined Fortaleza on loan.

== Career statistics ==
As of 15 August 2023

Appearances and goals by club, season and competition
| Club | Season | League | | | State League | | Cup | | Continental | | Other | | Total | |
| Club | Season | Division | Apps | Goals | Apps | Goals | Apps | Goals | Apps | Goals | Apps | Goals | Apps | Goals |
|---|---|---|---|---|---|---|---|---|---|---|---|---|---|---|
| Fluminense (loan) | 2009 | Série A | 16 | 6 | — | | — | | 4 | 0 | — | | 20 | 6 |
| Fluminense (loan) | 2010 | Série A | — | | 4 | 0 | — | | — | | — | | 4 | 0 |
| Fluminense (loan) | Total | | 16 | 6 | 4 | 0 | — | | 4 | 0 | — | | 24 | 6 |
| Cruzeiro | 2010 | Série A | 1 | 0 | 4 | 2 | — | | — | | — | | 5 | 2 |
| Ponte Preta (loan) | 2010 | Série B | 7 | 1 | — | | — | | — | | — | | 7 | 1 |
| Náutico (loan) | 2011 | Série B | 35 | 21 | 9 | 5 | 3 | 1 | — | | — | | 47 | 27 |
| Al Shabab (loan) | 2011–12 | UAE Pro League | 19 | 7 | — | | 0 | 0 | 6 | 1 | 4 | 2 | 29 | 10 |
| Náutico (loan) | 2012 | Série A | 20 | 13 | — | | — | | — | | — | | 20 | 13 |
| Náutico (loan) | 2013 | Série A | — | | 3 | 3 | — | | — | | — | | 3 | 3 |
| Náutico (loan) | Total | | 20 | 13 | 3 | 3 | — | | — | | — | | 23 | 16 |
| Shanghai Shenxin | 2013 | Chinese Super League | 23 | 11 | — | | 0 | 0 | — | | — | | 23 | 11 |
| Shanghai Shenxin | 2014 | Chinese Super League | 11 | 2 | — | | — | | — | | — | | 11 | 2 |
| Shanghai Shenxin | Total | | 34 | 13 | — | | 0 | 0 | — | | — | | 34 | 13 |
| Bahia (loan) | 2014 | Série A | 19 | 6 | — | | — | | 3 | 0 | — | | 22 | 6 |
| Bahia (loan) | 2015 | Série B | 24 | 14 | 12 | 8 | 2 | 2 | 1 | 0 | 11 | 5 | 50 | 29 |
| Bahia (loan) | Total | | 43 | 20 | 12 | 8 | 2 | 2 | 4 | 0 | 11 | 5 | 72 | 35 |
| São Paulo | 2016 | Série A | — | | 1 | 0 | — | | 1 | 0 | — | | 2 | 0 |
| Vitória | 2016 | Série A | 35 | 9 | 5 | 2 | 4 | 1 | 2 | 1 | — | | 46 | 13 |
| Vitória | 2017 | Série A | 13 | 3 | 5 | 5 | 4 | 0 | — | | 9 | 4 | 31 | 12 |
| Vitória | 2018 | Série A | — | | 2 | 0 | 0 | 0 | — | | 1 | 0 | 3 | 0 |
| Vitória | Total | | 48 | 12 | 12 | 7 | 8 | 1 | 2 | 1 | 10 | 4 | 80 | 25 |
| Botafogo | 2018 | Série A | 27 | 7 | 9 | 3 | 1 | 0 | 3 | 0 | — | | 40 | 10 |
| Botafogo | 2019 | Série A | 0 | 0 | 6 | 1 | 3 | 0 | 2 | 0 | — | | 11 | 1 |
| Botafogo | Total | | 27 | 7 | 15 | 4 | 4 | 0 | 5 | 0 | — | | 51 | 11 |
| Fortaleza (loan) | 2019 | Série A | 24 | 1 | — | | — | | — | | — | | 24 | 1 |
| Náutico | 2020 | Série B | 26 | 8 | 5 | 2 | — | | — | | 5 | 1 | 36 | 11 |
| Náutico | 2021 | Série B | 10 | 2 | 12 | 10 | — | | — | | — | | 22 | 12 |
| Náutico | 2022 | Série B | 19 | 1 | 4 | 0 | — | | — | | 2 | 0 | 25 | 1 |
| Náutico | Total | | 55 | 11 | 21 | 12 | — | | — | | 7 | 1 | 83 | 24 |
| Brasiliense | 2023 | Série D | 2 | 0 | — | | 0 | 0 | — | | 2 | 0 | 4 | 0 |
| Floresta | 2023 | Série C | 6 | 0 | — | | — | | — | | — | | 6 | 0 |
| Career total | | | 337 | 112 | 77 | 41 | 17 | 4 | 21 | 2 | 34 | 12 | 486 | 171 |

== Honours ==
Bahia

- Campeonato Baiano: 2015

Vitória

- Campeonato Baiano: 2016, 2017

Botafogo

- Campeonato Carioca: 2018

Náutico

- Campeonato Pernambucano: 2021
