= Retrô Futebol Clube Brasil =

Retrô
- Full name: Retrô Futebol Clube Brasil
- Nicknames: Soberano Recifense (Sovereign of Recife); Azulão (Big Blue); Fênix (Phoenix)
- Founded: 15 February 2016; 10 years ago
- Ground: Arena Pernambuco
- Capacity: 44,300
- Head coach: Milton Mendes
- League: Campeonato Brasileiro Série D Campeonato Pernambucano
- 2025 2025: Série C, 19th of 20 (relegated); Pernambucano, 2nd of 10
- Website: https://retrofcbrasil.com.br/
Home colours	Away colours	Third colours

Retrô Futebol Clube Brasil, commonly known as Retrô, is a Brazilian football club based in Camaragibe, Pernambuco. They compete in the Campeonato Pernambucano, as well as the Campeonato Brasileiro Série C.

== Players ==
=== Squad ===
As of 1 May 2023

Note: Flags indicate national team as defined under FIFA eligibility rules; some limited exceptions apply. Players may hold more than one non-FIFA nationality.

No.	Pos.	Nation	Player
—	GK	BRA	Erivelton
—	GK	BRA	Jean
—	DF	BRA	Sandoval
—	DF	BRA	Guilherme Paraíba
—	DF	BRA	Renan Dutra
—	DF	BRA	Yuri Bigode
—	DF	BRA	Edson Lucas
—	DF	BRA	João Victor
—	DF	BRA	Bruno Moura
—	DF	BRA	Israel Novaes
—	MF	BRA	Hudson
—	MF	BRA	Jonas
—	MF	BRA	Maycon
—	MF	BRA	Ratinho
—	MF	BRA	Rômulo

No.	Pos.	Nation	Player
—	MF	BRA	Jean
—	MF	BRA	Alencar
—	MF	BRA	Albano
—	MF	BRA	Diego Guerra
—	MF	BRA	Renato Henrique
—	MF	BRA	Radsley
—	FW	BRA	Júnior Fialho
—	FW	BRA	Wiliam Marcílio
—	FW	BRA	Luisinho
—	FW	BRA	Fernandinho
—	FW	BRA	Gustavo Ermel
—	FW	BRA	Matheus Serafim
—	FW	BRA	Mike
—	FW	BRA	Giva
—	FW	BRA	Marquinhos

== Honours ==
=== Official tournaments ===
National
Competitions	Titles	Seasons
Campeonato Brasileiro Série D	1	2024

=== Runners-up ===
- Campeonato Pernambucano (3): 2022, 2023, 2025
- Campeonato Pernambucano Série A2 (1): 2019
