= Vera Cruz Futebol Clube =

Vera Cruz
- Full name: Vera Cruz Futebol Clube
- Nickname(s): Tricolor do Povo; Galo das Tabocas; Galo do Maués; Galo da Zona da Mata
- Founded: 3 February 1960; 65 years ago
- Ground: Carneirão, Vitória de Santo Antão, Pernambuco state, Brazil
- Capacity: 8,000
Home colours	Away colours

Vera Cruz Futebol Clube, commonly known as Vera Cruz, is a Brazilian football club based in Vitória de Santo Antão, Pernambuco state. They competed in the Série C once.

== History ==
The club was founded on 3 February 1960. Vera Cruz won the Campeonato Pernambucano Third Level in 2002, and the Campeonato Pernambucano Second Level in 2006 and in 2009. They competed in the Série C in 2007, when they were eliminated in the First Stage of the competition.

== Honours ==
- Campeonato Pernambucano Série A2
  - Winners (4): 2006, 2009, 2014, 2020
- Campeonato Pernambucano Série A3
  - Winners (1): 2002

== Stadium ==
Vera Cruz Futebol Clube play their home games at Estádio Municipal Severino Cândido Carneiro, nicknamed Carneirão. The stadium has a maximum capacity of 8,000 people.
