= 2003 Sport Club do Recife season =

Sport Recife
2003 season
- Chairman: Severino Otávio
- Manager: Hélio dos Anjos
- Stadium: Ilha do Retiro
- Série B: 3rd
- Pernambucano: Champions (34th title)
- Copa do Brasil: Semi-finals
- Top goalscorer: League: Gaúcho (8); All: Valdir Papel (26)
Home colours	Away colours	Third colours

The 2003 season was Sport Recife's 99th season in the club's history. Sport competed in the Campeonato Pernambucano, Copa do Brasil and Série B.

== Statistics ==
=== Overall ===
Games played	71 (27 Pernambucano, 9 Copa do Brasil, 35 Série B)
Games won	37 (19 Pernambucano, 6 Copa do Brasil, 12 Série B)
Games drawn	21 (6 Pernambucano, 1 Copa do Brasil, 14 Série B)
Games lost	13 (2 Pernambucano, 2 Copa do Brasil, 9 Série B)
Goals scored	139
Goals conceded	75
Goal difference	+64
Best results (goal difference)	8–0 (H) v 1º de Maio - Pernambucano - 2003.03.01
Worst result (goal difference)	2–4 (A) v Itacuruba - Pernambucano - 2003.06.04
Top scorer	Valdir Papel (26)

Source: Sport Recife official website

=== Goalscorers ===
Place	Pos.	Nat.	Name	Campeonato Pernambucano	Copa do Brasil	Série B	Total
1	FW	(Brazil)	Valdir Papel	15	4	7	26
2	DF	(Brazil)	Gaúcho	10	3	8	21
3	MF	(Brazil)	Cléber Santana	9	5	4	18
4	FW	(Brazil)	Adriano Chuva	10	0	6	16
5	MF	(Brazil)	Nildo	6	3	6	15
6	FW	(Brazil)	Weldon	4	0	7	11
7	FW	(Brazil)	Ricardinho	3	0	3	6
8	MF	(Brazil)	Clayson Rato	5	0	0	5
8	FW	(Brazil)	Júnior Amorim	4	1	0	5
9	DF	(Brazil)	Sílvio Criciúma	0	1	2	3
9	MF	(Brazil)	Vágner Mancini	0	0	3	3
9	MF	(Brazil)	Fernando César	2	0	1	3
10	DF	(Brazil)	Ademar	0	0	1	1
10		(Brazil)	Carlinhos	1	0	0	1
10	DF	(Brazil)	Cléber	1	0	0	1
10	MF	(Brazil)	Djalma	1	0	0	1
10		(Brazil)	Marcão	1	0	0	1
10		(Brazil)	Willians	1	0	0	1
			Own goals	1	0	1	2
			Total	74	17	49	140

== Competitions ==
=== Campeonato Pernambucano ===
==== First stage ====
26 January 2003 1	Sport	1–1	Recife	Recife
16:00 (UTC-3)	Cléber Santana		Goal	Stadium: Estádio Adelmar da Costa Carvalho (Ilha do Retiro)

29 January 2003 2	Intercontinental	2–2	Sport	Ipojuca
20:30 (UTC-3)	Goal		Valdir Papel; Nildo	Stadium: Estádio Municipal de Nossa Senhora do Ó

1 February 2003 3	Sport	8–0	1º de Maio	Recife
16:00 (UTC-3)	Carlinhos; Júnior Amorim, Nildo, Valdir Papel, Fernando César			Stadium: Estádio Adelmar da Costa Carvalho (Ilha do Retiro)

9 February 2003 4	Sport	4–0	Petrolina	Recife
16:00 (UTC-3)	Gaúcho; Valdir Papel, Cleyson Rato			Stadium: Estádio Adelmar da Costa Carvalho (Ilha do Retiro)

12 February 2003 5	Sport	3–1	Central	Recife
20:30 (UTC-3)	Valdir Papel; Nildo; Júnior Amorim		Goal	Stadium: Estádio Adelmar da Costa Carvalho (Ilha do Retiro)

16 February 2003 6	Santa Cruz	2–1	Sport	Recife
16:00 (UTC-3)	Goal		Djalma	Stadium: Estádio José do Rego Maciel (Arruda)

23 February 2003 7	Itacuruba	0–4	Sport	Itacuruba
16:00 (UTC-3)			Adriano Chuva; Valdir Papel; Willians; Clayson Rato	Stadium: Estádio Antônio Galdêncio Freire

26 February 2003 8	Sport	3–1	Náutico	Recife
20:30 (UTC-3)	Gaúcho, Adriano Chuva		Goal	Stadium: Estádio Adelmar da Costa Carvalho (Ilha do Retiro)

8 March 2003 9	AGA	2–3	Sport	Garanhuns
16:00 (UTC-3)	Goal		Valdir Papel; Adriano Chuva; Cléber Santana	Stadium: Estádio Marco Antônio Maciel (Gigante do Agreste)

==== Second stage ====
12 March 2003 1	Recife	2–3	Sport	Goiana
20:30 (UTC-3)	Goal		Adriano Chuva; Valdir Papel; Cléber Santana	Stadium: Estádio Agamenon Magalhães

15 March 2003 2	Sport	4–2	Intercontinental	Recife
16:00 (UTC-3)	Adriano Chuva; Valdir Papel; Marcão; Gaúcho		Goal	Stadium: Estádio Adelmar da Costa Carvalho (Ilha do Retiro)

29 March 2003 3	1º de Maio	1–1	Sport	Petrolina
16:00 (UTC-3)	Goal		Cléber Santana	Stadium: Estádio Estádio Paulo de Souza Coelho (Associação Rural)

1 April 2003 4	Petrolina	1–2	Sport	Petrolina
20:30 (UTC-3)	Goal		Cléber Santana; Gaúcho	Stadium: Estádio Estádio Paulo de Souza Coelho (Associação Rural)

6 April 2003 5	Sport	2–1	Santa Cruz	Recife
20:30 (UTC-3)	Ricardinho,		Goal	Stadium: Estádio Adelmar da Costa Carvalho (Ilha do Retiro)

13 April 2003 6	Central	0–4	Sport	Caruaru
16:00 (UTC-3)			Valdir Papel; Adriano Chuva, Ricardinho	Stadium: Estádio Luiz José de Lacerda (Lacerdão)

16 April 2003 7	Sport	4–0	Itacuruba	Recife
20:00 (UTC-3)	Nildo; Cléber Santana; Valdir Papel; Gaúcho			Stadium: Estádio Adelmar da Costa Carvalho (Ilha do Retiro)

20 April 2003 8	Náutico	1–2	Sport	Recife
16:00 (UTC-3)	Goal		Gaúcho; Cléber Santana	Stadium: Estádio Eládio de Barros Carvalho (Aflitos)

5 May 2003 9	Sport	1–0	AGA	Recife
20:30 (UTC-3)	Júnior Amorim			Stadium: Estádio Adelmar da Costa Carvalho (Ilha do Retiro)

==== Third stage ====
4 June 2003	Itacuruba	4–2	Sport	Recife
20:30 (UTC-3)	Goal		Savoca (o.g.); Valdir Papel	Stadium: Estádio Adelmar da Costa Carvalho (Ilha do Retiro)

11 June 2003	Sport	4–0	Itacuruba	Recife
20:30 (UTC-3)	Gaúcho; Valdir Papel; Cléber Santana; Adriano Chuva			Stadium: Estádio Adelmar da Costa Carvalho (Ilha do Retiro)

==== Fourth stage ====
17 June 2003 1	Náutico	0–3	Sport	Recife
20:30 (UTC-3)			Weldon, Gaúcho	Stadium: Estádio Eládio de Barros Carvalho (Aflitos)

24 June 2003 2	Sport	5–1	AGA	Recife
20:30 (UTC-3)	Clayson Rato, Valdir Papel; Adriano Chuva; Weldon		Goal	Stadium: Estádio Adelmar da Costa Carvalho (Ilha do Retiro)

1 July 2003 3	Santa Cruz	0–1	Sport	Recife
20:30 (UTC-3)			Nildo	Stadium: Estádio José do Rego Maciel (Arruda)

8 July 2003 4	Sport	2–2	Santa Cruz	Recife
20:30 (UTC-3)	Adriano Chuva; Cléber Santana		Goal	Stadium: Estádio Adelmar da Costa Carvalho (Ilha do Retiro)

15 July 2003 5	AGA	1–1	Sport	Garanhuns
20:30 (UTC-3)	Goal		Gaúcho	Stadium: Estádio Gerson Emery

22 July 2003 6	Sport	2–1	Náutico	Recife
20:30 (UTC-3)	Weldon; Fernando César		Goal	Stadium: Estádio Adelmar da Costa Carvalho (Ilha do Retiro)

==== Final ====
30 July 2003	Sport	2–2	Santa Cruz	Recife
20:30 (UTC-3)	Cléber 54'; Clayson Rato 89'		Valença 20'; Batata 61'	Stadium: Estádio Adelmar da Costa Carvalho (Ilha do Retiro); Attendance: 16,270; Referee: Wilson de Souza Mendonça

==== Record ====
Final Position	Points	Matches	Wins	Draws	Losses	Goals For	Goals Away	Avg%
1st	63	27	19	6	2	74	30	77%

=== Copa do Brasil ===
==== First round ====
19 February 2003	Dom Bosco	0–5	Sport	Cuiabá
(UTC-3)			Gaúcho; Cléber Santana; Valdir Papel; Nildo; Júnior Amorim	Stadium: Estádio Governador José Fragelli (Verdão)

==== Second round ====
19 March 2003	Atlético Paranaense	2–3	Sport	Curitiba
(UTC-3)	Goal		Nildo; Cléber Santana; Valdir Papel	Stadium: Estádio Joaquim Américo Guimarães (Arena da Baixada)

26 March 2003	Sport	1–0	Atlético Paranaense	Recife
(UTC-3)			Cléber Santana	Stadium: Estádio Adelmar da Costa Carvalho (Ilha do Retiro)

==== Third round ====
24 April 2003	Fluminense	0–1	Sport	Rio de Janeiro
(UTC-3)			Valdir Papel	Stadium: Estádio Jornalista Mário Filho (Maracanã)

1 May 2003	Sport	2–1	Fluminense	Recife
(UTC-3)	Gaúcho; Cléber Santana		Goal	Stadium: Estádio Adelmar da Costa Carvalho (Ilha do Retiro)

==== Quarter-finals ====
7 May 2003	Sport	4–0	Atlético Mineiro	Recife
(UTC-3)	Gaúcho; Cléber Santana; Sílvio Criciúma; Valdir Papel			Stadium: Estádio Adelmar da Costa Carvalho (Ilha do Retiro)

14 May 2003	Atlético Mineiro	3–1	Sport	Belo Horizonte
(UTC-3)	Goal		Nildo	Stadium: Estádio Governador Magalhães Pinto (Mineirão)

==== Semi-finals ====
21 May 2003	Sport	0–1	Flamengo	Recife
(UTC-3)			Goal	Stadium: Estádio Adelmar da Costa Carvalho (Ilha do Retiro)

28 May 2003	Flamengo	0–0	Sport	Rio de Janeiro
(UTC-3)				Stadium: Estádio Jornalista Mário Filho (Maracanã)

==== Record ====
Final Position	Points	Matches	Wins	Draws	Losses	Goals For	Goals Away	Avg%
3rd	19	9	6	1	2	17	7	70%

=== Série B ===
==== First stage ====
27 April 2003 1	CRB	1–1	Sport	Maceió
16:00 (UTC-3)	Goal		Gaúcho	Stadium: Estádio Rei Pelé

4 May 2003 2	Sport	2–0	Paulista	Recife
16:00 (UTC-3)	Ricardinho; Adriano Chuva			Stadium: Estádio Adelmar da Costa Carvalho (Ilha do Retiro)

10 May 2003 3	Avaí	2–0	Sport	Florianópolis
16:00 (UTC-3)	Goal			Stadium: Estádio Aderbal Ramos da Silva (Ressacada)

17 May 2003 4	Sport	2–2	Marília	Recife
16:00 (UTC-3)	Fernando César; Adriano Chuva		Goal	Stadium: Estádio Adelmar da Costa Carvalho (Ilha do Retiro)

24 May 2003 5	Vila Nova	0–1	Sport	Goiânia
16:00 (UTC-3)			Valdir Papel	Stadium: Estádio do Governo do Estado de Goiás (Serra Dourada)

1 June 2003 6	Sport	3–2	São Raimundo	Recife
16:00 (UTC-3)	Valdir Papel, Nildo		Goal	Stadium: Estádio Adelmar da Costa Carvalho (Ilha do Retiro)

8 June 2003 7	Gama	1–2	Sport	Gama
16:00 (UTC-3)	Goal		Nildo; Gaúcho	Stadium: Estádio Walmir Campelo Bezerra (Bezerrão)

14 June 2003 8	Sport	1–1	Londrina	Recife
16:00 (UTC-3)	Dário (o.g.)		Goal	Stadium: Estádio Adelmar da Costa Carvalho (Ilha do Retiro)

21 June 2003 9	Mogi Mirim	0–0	Sport	Mogi Mirim
20:30 (UTC-3)				Stadium: Estádio Wilson de Barros

27 June 2003 10	União São João	3–2	Sport	Araras
20:30 (UTC-3)	Goal		Gaúcho; Weldon	Stadium: Estádio Doutor Hermínio Ometto

4 July 2003 11	Sport	2–2	América–RN	Recife
20:30 (UTC-3)	Adriano Chuva; Valdir Papel		Goal	Stadium: Estádio Adelmar da Costa Carvalho (Ilha do Retiro)

12 July 2003 12	Sport	1–2	Botafogo	Recife
21:40 (UTC-3)	Weldon		Goal	Stadium: Estádio Adelmar da Costa Carvalho (Ilha do Retiro)

18 July 2003 13	Náutico	0–1	Sport	Recife
20:30 (UTC-3)			Gaúcho	Stadium: Estádio Eládio de Barros Carvalho (Aflitos)

25 July 2003 14	Sport	0–0	Brasiliense	Recife
20:30 (UTC-3)				Stadium: Estádio Adelmar da Costa Carvalho (Ilha do Retiro)

2 August 2003 15	Sport	3–0	Joinville	Recife
19:00 (UTC-3)	Gaúcho; Adriano Chuva; Weldon			Stadium: Estádio Adelmar da Costa Carvalho (Ilha do Retiro)

5 August 2003 16	Remo	1–0	Sport	Belém
20:30 (UTC-3)	Goal			Stadium: Estádio Olímpico do Pará (Mangueirão)

16 August 2003 17	Sport	4–0	Santa Cruz	Recife
20:30 (UTC-3)	Cléber Santana; Weldon; Nildo; Ricardinho			Stadium: Estádio Adelmar da Costa Carvalho (Ilha do Retiro)

30 August 2003 18	Palmeiras	2–2	Sport	São Paulo
16:00 (UTC-3)	Goal		Gaúcho; Vágner Mancini	Stadium: Estádio Palestra Itália (Parque Antártica)

6 September 2003 19	Sport	2–2	Anapolina	Recife
16:00 (UTC-3)	Nildo,		Goal	Stadium: Estádio Adelmar da Costa Carvalho (Ilha do Retiro)

9 September 2003 20	Sport	1–1	América–MG	Recife
20:30 (UTC-3)	Vágner Mancini		Goal	Stadium: Estádio Adelmar da Costa Carvalho (Ilha do Retiro)

12 September 2003 21	Ceará	0–2	Sport	Fortaleza
20:30 (UTC-3)			Adriano Chuva; Nildo	Stadium: Estádio Governador Plácido Castelo (Castelão)

16 September 2003 22	Caxias	0–0	Sport	Caxias do Sul
20:30 (UTC-3)				Stadium: Estádio Francisco Stédile (Centenário)

27 September 2003 23	Sport	2–0	Portuguesa	Recife
16:00 (UTC-3)	Adriano Chuva; Cléber Santana			Stadium: Estádio Adelmar da Costa Carvalho (Ilha do Retiro)

==== Second stage ====
3 October 2003 1	Brasiliense	1–0	Sport	Taguatinga
20:30 (UTC-3)	Paulo Isidoro 14'			Stadium: Estádio Elmo Serejo Farias (Boca do Jacaré)

7 October 2003 2	Sport	3–1	Santa Cruz	Recife
20:30 (UTC-3)	Silvio Criciúma 8'; Weldon 12', 30'		Williams 33'	Stadium: Estádio Adelmar da Costa Carvalho (Ilha do Retiro)

11 October 2003 3	Sport	1–2	Palmeiras	Recife
21:40 (UTC-3)	Cléber Santana 78' (pen.)		Leonardo 27'; Vágner Love 42'	Stadium: Estádio Adelmar da Costa Carvalho (Ilha do Retiro)

18 October 2003 4	Palmeiras	2–3	Sport	São Paulo
20:30 (UTC-3)	Vágner Love 9'; Edmílson 64'		Gaúcho 18'; Weldon 31'; Cléber Santana 83' (pen.)	Stadium: Estádio Palestra Itália (Parque Antártica)

21 October 2003 5	Santa Cruz	1–1	Sport	Recife
20:30 (UTC-3)	Bebeto 40'		Vagner Mancini 35'	Stadium: Estádio José do Rego Maciel (Arruda)

25 October 2003 6	Sport	1–1	Brasiliense	Recife
16:00 (UTC-3)	Silvio Criciúma 36'		Tiano 69'	Stadium: Estádio Adelmar da Costa Carvalho (Ilha do Retiro)

==== Final stage ====
1 November 2003 1	Sport	0–0	Marília	Recife
16:00 (UTC-3)				Stadium: Estádio Adelmar da Costa Carvalho (Ilha do Retiro); Attendance: 21,367; Referee: Wagner Tardelli

5 November 2003 2	Palmeiras	1–0	Sport	São Paulo
21:40 (UTC-3)	Daniel 48'			Stadium: Estádio Palestra Itália (Parque Antártica); Attendance: 24,868; Referee: Wagner Tardelli

8 November 2003 3	Botafogo	3–1	Sport	Niterói
16:00 (UTC-3)	Dill 6'; Almir 38'; Edivaldo 88'		Ademar 61'	Stadium: Estádio Caio Martins; Attendance: 7,598; Referee: Carlos Eugenio Simon

15 November 2003 4	Sport	3–1	Botafogo	Recife
16:00 (UTC-3)	Valdir Papel 17', 46'; Ricardinho 90'		Almir 88'	Stadium: Estádio Adelmar da Costa Carvalho (Ilha do Retiro); Attendance: 10,328; Referee: Márcio Rezende de Freitas

22 November 2003 5	Sport	1–2	Palmeiras	Garanhuns
21:45 (UTC-3)	Gaúcho 57'		Magrão 65'; Edmílson 77'	Stadium: Marco Antônio Maciel (Gigante do Agreste); Referee: Heber Roberto Lopes

29 November 2003 6	Marília	1–1	Sport	Marília
16:00 (UTC-3)	Rogério Souza 29' (pen.)		Valdir Papel 13'	Stadium: Estádio Municipal (Bento de Abreu) Sampaio Vidal; Attendance: 748; Referee: Alicio Pena Júnior

==== Record ====
Final Position	Points	Matches	Wins	Draws	Losses	Goals For	Goals Away	Avg%
3rd	50	35	12	14	9	49	38	47%
