= 2004 Sport Club do Recife season =

Sport Recife
2004 season
- Chairman: Severino Otávio
- Manager: Hélio dos Anjos; Heriberto da Cunha
- Stadium: Ilha do Retiro
- Série B: 17th
- Pernambucano: 3rd
- Copa do Brasil: Second round
- Top goalscorer: League: Alecsandro, Canela, Nildo and Róbson (3); All: Alecsandro (10)
Home colours	Away colours	Third colours

The 2004 season was Sport Recife's 100th season in the club's history. Sport competed in the Campeonato Pernambucano, Copa do Brasil and Série B.

== Statistics ==
=== Overall ===
Games played	45 (18 Pernambucano, 4 Copa do Brasil, 23 Série B)
Games won	19 (10 Pernambucano, 2 Copa do Brasil, 7 Série B)
Games drawn	12 (4 Pernambucano, 1 Copa do Brasil, 7 Série B)
Games lost	14 (4 Pernambucano, 1 Copa do Brasil, 9 Série B)
Goals scored	64
Goals conceded	59
Goal difference	+5
Best results (goal difference)	4–0 (H) v Atlético Roraima - Copa do Brasil - 2004.02.18
Worst result (goal difference)	1–7 (L) v Marília - Série B - 2004.04.27
Top scorer	Alecsandro (10)

Source: Sport Recife official website

=== Goalscorers ===
Place	Pos.	Nat.	Name	Campeonato Pernambucano	Copa do Brasil	Série B	Total
1	FW	(Brazil)	Alecsandro	4	3	3	10
1	FW	(Brazil)	Nildo	6	1	3	10
2	MF	(Brazil)	Leozinho	5	0	1	6
3	FW	(Brazil)	Valdir Papel	2	3	0	5
4	FW	(Brazil)	Canela	0	0	3	3
4	MF	(Brazil)	Danilo Goiano	1	0	2	3
4	MF	(Brazil)	Jaílson	3	0	0	3
4	FW	(Brazil)	Leonardo	2	0	1	3
4	DF	(Brazil)	Marcão	3	0	0	3
4	FW	(Brazil)	Róbson	0	0	3	3
5	MF	(Brazil)	Cleisson	0	0	2	2
5	FW	(Brazil)	Danilo Santos	0	0	2	2
5	FW	(Brazil)	Ricardinho	0	0	2	2
5	MF	(Brazil)	Rogério Belém	2	0	0	2
6	DF	(Brazil)	Ademar	1	0	0	1
6	DF	(Brazil)	Everaldo	1	0	0	1
6	MF	(Brazil)	Éverton	0	0	1	1
6	MF	(Brazil)	Jean Carlos	0	0	1	1
6	MF	(Brazil)	Léo Mineiro	1	0	0	1
6	DF	(Brazil)	Luciano Baiano	1	0	0	1
6	DF	(Brazil)	Sílvio Criciúma	1	0	0	1
			Total	33	7	24	64

== Competitions ==
=== Campeonato Pernambucano ===
==== First stage ====
18 January 2004 1	Serrano	1–0	Sport	Serra Talhada
17:00 (UTC-3)	Goal			Stadium: Estádio Nildo Pereira de Menezes

21 January 2004 2	Itacuruba	3–1	Sport	Itacuruba
20:30 (UTC-3)	Goal		Nildo	Stadium: Estádio Antônio Galdêncio Freire

24 January 2004 3	Sport	3–2	Recife	Recife
15:00 (UTC-3)	Jaílson, Valdir Papel		Goal	Stadium: Estádio Adelmar da Costa Carvalho (Ilha do Retiro)

28 January 2004 4	Central	1–3	Sport	Caruaru
20:30 (UTC-3)	Goal		Nildo; Rogério Belém; Alecsandro	Stadium: Estádio Luiz José de Lacerda (Lacerdão)

31 January 2004 5	Sport	1–0	Petrolina	Recife
17:00 (UTC-3)	Ademar			Stadium: Estádio Adelmar da Costa Carvalho (Ilha do Retiro)

8 February 2004 6	Náutico	1–2	Sport	Recife
15:00 (UTC-3)	Almir Sergipe		Rogério Belém; Alecsandro	Stadium: Estádio Eládio de Barros Carvalho (Aflitos)

11 February 2004 7	Sport	2–2	Porto	Recife
20:30 (UTC-3)	Jaílson; Nildo		Goal	Stadium: Estádio Adelmar da Costa Carvalho (Ilha do Retiro)

16 February 2004 8	Sport	0–1	Santa Cruz	Recife
20:30 (UTC-3)			Clécio (o.g.)	Stadium: Estádio Adelmar da Costa Carvalho (Ilha do Retiro)

25 February 2004 9	AGA	0–2	Sport	Garanhuns
20:30 (UTC-3)			Leonardo; Leozinho	Stadium: Estádio Marco Antônio Maciel (Gigante do Agreste)

==== Second stage ====
28 February 2004 1	Sport	2–2	Serrano	Recife
16:00 (UTC-3)	Nildo; Leozinho		Goal	Stadium: Estádio Adelmar da Costa Carvalho (Ilha do Retiro)

4 March 2004 2	Sport	3–2	Itacuruba	Recife
21:45 (UTC-3)	Marcão; Leonardo; Leozinho	Report	Marcelo Cavalo; Daniel	Stadium: Estádio Adelmar da Costa Carvalho (Ilha do Retiro)

10 March 2004 3	Recife	0–1	Sport	Ipojuca
20:30 (UTC-3)			Alecsandro	Stadium: Estádio Municipal de Nossa Senhora do Ó

14 March 2004 4	Sport	3–0	Central	Recife
16:00 (UTC-3)	Sílvio Criciúma; Alecsandro; Danilo Goiano			Stadium: Estádio Adelmar da Costa Carvalho (Ilha do Retiro)

21 March 2004 5	Petrolina	3–3	Sport	Petrolina
16:00 (UTC-3)	Goal		Nildo; Everaldo; Luciano Baiano	Stadium: Estádio da Associação Rural de Petrolina

28 March 2004 6	Sport	1–3	Náutico	Recife
16:00 (UTC-3)	Léo Mineiro		Gil Baiano 52'; Batata 59'; Kuki	Stadium: Estádio Adelmar da Costa Carvalho (Ilha do Retiro)

1 April 2004 7	Porto	2–3	Sport	Caruaru
20:30 (UTC-3)	Fábio Silva; Fabian		Leozinho; Marcão,	Stadium: Estádio Antônio Inácio de Souza (Vera Cruz)

4 April 2004 8	Santa Cruz	2–3	Sport	Recife
16:00 (UTC-3)	Paulo Renato; Dimas		Leozinho; Valdir Papel; Nildo	Stadium: Estádio José do Rego Maciel (Arruda)

7 April 2004 9	Sport	0–0	AGA	Recife
20:30 (UTC-3)				Stadium: Estádio Adelmar da Costa Carvalho (Ilha do Retiro)

==== Record ====
Final Position	Points	Matches	Wins	Draws	Losses	Goals For	Goals Away	Avg%
3rd	34	18	10	4	4	33	25	63%

=== Copa do Brasil ===
==== First round ====
4 February 2004	Atlético Roraima	1–2	Sport	Boa Vista
00:00 (UTC-4)	Goal		Nildo; Valdir Papel	Stadium: Estádio Flamarion Vasconcelos (Canarinho)

18 February 2004	Sport	4–0	Atlético Roraima	Recife
00:00 (UTC-3)	Alecsandro, Valdir Papel, (pen.)			Stadium: Estádio Adelmar da Costa Carvalho (Ilha do Retiro)

==== Second round ====
17 March 2004	Americano	2–1	Sport	Campos dos Goytacazes
00:00 (UTC-3)	Goal		Alecsandro	Stadium: Estádio Godofredo Cruz

24 March 2004	Sport	0–0	Americano	Recife
00:00 (UTC-3)				Stadium: Estádio Adelmar da Costa Carvalho (Ilha do Retiro)

==== Record ====
Final Position	Points	Matches	Wins	Draws	Losses	Goals For	Goals Away	Avg%
18th	7	4	2	1	1	7	3	58%

=== Série B ===
==== First stage ====
24 April 2004 1	Sport	3–0	Caxias	Recife
16:00 (UTC-3)	Nildo 6'; Danilo Goiano 86'; Everton 90'	Report		Stadium: Estádio Adelmar da Costa Carvalho (Ilha do Retiro); Attendance: 9,687

27 April 2004 2	Marília	7–1	Sport	Marília
20:30 (UTC-3)	Wellington Amorim 1'; Cássio; Éder, Vladimir; Fumagalli; Juninho	Report	Leonardo	Stadium: Estádio Municipal (Bento de Abreu) Sampaio Vidal

9 May 2004 3	Sport	0–0	Portuguesa	Recife
11:00 (UTC-3)		Report		Stadium: Estádio Adelmar da Costa Carvalho (Ilha do Retiro); Attendance: 14,228

14 May 2004 4	Avaí	1–1	Sport	Florianópolis
20:30 (UTC-3)	Goal		Cleisson	Stadium: Estádio Aderbal Ramos da Silva (Ressacada)

18 May 2004 5	Sport	1–1	América–RN	Recife
20:30 (UTC-3)	Róbson		Goal	Stadium: Estádio Adelmar da Costa Carvalho (Ilha do Retiro)

30 May 2004 6	América–MG	2–2	Sport	Belo Horizonte
00:00 (UTC-3)	Goal		Nildo; Róbson	Stadium: Estádio Raimundo Sampaio (Independência)

4 June 2004 7	Sport	1–0	Ituano	Recife
20:30 (UTC-3)	Alecsandro			Stadium: Estádio Adelmar da Costa Carvalho (Ilha do Retiro)

12 June 2004 8	Santo André	2–0	Sport	Santo André
16:00 (UTC-3)	Goal			Stadium: Estádio Municipal Bruno José Daniel

18 June 2004 9	Sport	1–1	Mogi Mirim	Recife
20:30 (UTC-3)	Nildo		Goal	Stadium: Estádio Adelmar da Costa Carvalho (Ilha do Retiro)

22 June 2004 10	Vila Nova	2–1	Sport	Goiânia
20:30 (UTC-3)	Goal		Jean Carlos	Stadium: Estádio do Governo do Estado de Goiás (Serra Dourada)

6 July 2004 12	Sport	0–1	Bahia	Recife
20:30 (UTC-3)			Goal	Stadium: Estádio Adelmar da Costa Carvalho (Ilha do Retiro)

16 July 2004 13	Remo	2–0	Sport	Belém
20:30 (UTC-3)	Rodrigo Broa 25'; Wegno 89'			Stadium: Estádio Olímpico do Pará (Mangueirão)

24 July 2004 14	Sport	2–1	Fortaleza	Recife
20:30 (UTC-3)	Canela 90+1'; Danilo Santos 90+2'	Report	59'	Stadium: Estádio Adelmar da Costa Carvalho (Ilha do Retiro)

27 July 2004 15	Londrina	0–2	Sport	Londrina
20:30 (UTC-3)			Ricardinho,	Stadium: Estádio Jacy Scaff (do Café)

3 August 2004 16	Sport	2–1	Joinville	Recife
20:30 (UTC-3)	Róbson; Danilo Goiano		William 15'	Stadium: Estádio Adelmar da Costa Carvalho (Ilha do Retiro)

8 August 2004 11*	Sport	0–1	Santa Cruz	Recife
16:00 (UTC-3)			Carlinhos Bala	Stadium: Estádio Adelmar da Costa Carvalho (Ilha do Retiro)

13 August 2004 17	Ceará	1–2	Sport	Fortaleza
20:30 (UTC-3)	Goal		Danilo Santos; Alecsandro	Stadium: Estádio Governador Plácido Castelo (Castelão)

17 August 2004 18	Sport	2–1	São Raimundo	Recife
20:30 (UTC-3)	Cleisson; Alecsandro		Goal	Stadium: Estádio Adelmar da Costa Carvalho (Ilha do Retiro)

28 August 2004 19	Náutico	3–1	Sport	Recife
16:00 (UTC-3)	Marco Antônio; Marquinhos; Anaílson		Canela	Stadium: Estádio Eládio de Barros Carvalho (Aflitos)

31 August 2004 20	Sport	1–1	Brasiliense	Recife
20:30 (UTC-3)	Canela 40'	Report	Wellington Dias 81' (pen.)	Stadium: Estádio Adelmar da Costa Carvalho (Ilha do Retiro)

10 September 2004 21	CRB	1–1	Sport	Maceió
20:30 (UTC-3)	Goal		Leozinho	Stadium: Estádio Rei Pelé

17 September 2004 22	Sport	0–1	Anapolina	Recife
20:30 (UTC-3)			Goal	Stadium: Estádio Adelmar da Costa Carvalho (Ilha do Retiro)

25 September 2004 23	Paulista	1–0	Sport	Jundiaí
16:00 (UTC-3)	Goal			Stadium: Estádio Dr. Jayme Cintra

==== Record ====
Final Position	Points	Matches	Wins	Draws	Losses	Goals For	Goals Away	Avg%
17th	28	23	7	7	9	24	31	40%
