= 2001 Sport Club do Recife season =

Sport Recife
2001 season
- Chairman: Fernando Pessoa
- Manager: Jair Pereira; Mauro Fernandes
- Stadium: Ilha do Retiro
- Série B: 28th
- Pernambucano: 3rd
- Copa do Brasil: Second round
- Copa do Nordeste: Runners-up
- Copa dos Campeões: First stage
- Top goalscorer: League: Edu Manga and Júnior Amorim (5); All: Rodrigo Gral (19)
Home colours	Away colours

The 2001 season was Sport Recife's 97th season in the club's history. Sport competed in the Campeonato Pernambucano, Copa do Nordeste, Copa do Brasil, Copa dos Campeões and Série A.

== Statistics ==
=== Overall ===
Games played	80 (28 Pernambucano, 17 Copa do Nordeste, 4 Copa do Brasil, 4 Copa dos Campeões, 27 Série A)
Games won	31 (15 Pernambucano, 9 Copa do Nordeste, 2 Copa do Brasil, 0 Copa dos Campeões, 5 Série A)
Games drawn	18 (7 Pernambucano, 5 Copa do Nordeste, 0 Copa do Brasil, 2 Copa dos Campeões, 4 Série A)
Games lost	31 (6 Pernambucano, 3 Copa do Nordeste, 2 Copa do Brasil, 2 Copa dos Campeões, 18 Série A)
Goals scored	119
Goals conceded	104
Goal difference	+15
Best results (goal difference)	7–1 (H) v Central - Pernambucano - 2001.06.17
Worst result (goal difference)	0–5 (A) v São Paulo - Copa dos Campeões - 2001.06.27
Top scorer	Rodrigo Gral (19)

Source: Sport Recife official website

=== Goalscorers ===
Place	Pos.	Nat.	Name	Campeonato Pernambucano	Copa do Nordeste	Copa do Brasil	Copa dos Campeões	Série A	Total
1	FW	(Brazil)	Rodrigo Gral	15	3	0	1	0	19
2	FW	(Brazil)	Leonardo	8	4	2	3	0	17
3	FW	(Brazil)	Ricardinho	2	6	0	0	4	12
4	FW	(Brazil)	Gilson Batata	6	1	0	0	0	7
4	MF	(Brazil)	Léomar	5	1	1	0	0	7
5	FW	(Brazil)	Balão	5	1	0	0	0	6
6	MF	(Brazil)	Edu Manga	0	0	0	0	5	5
6	FW	(Brazil)	Eduardo Marques	3	1	1	0	0	5
6		(Brazil)	Fabinho	0	1	1	0	3	5
6	FW	(Brazil)	Júnior Amorim	0	0	0	0	5	5
7	FW	(Brazil)	Irani	3	1	0	0	0	4
8	DF	(Brazil)	Dutra	2	0	0	1	0	3
8	FW	(Brazil)	Marcelo Passos	0	0	0	0	3	3
9	DF	(Brazil)	Juninho Rodrigues	0	2	0	0	0	2
9		(Brazil)	Marquinhos	2	0	0	0	0	2
9	MF	(Brazil)	Pedro Neto	1	1	0	0	0	2
9		(Brazil)	Rodrigão	2	0	0	0	0	2
9	MF	(Brazil)	Valdo	2	0	0	0	0	2
10		(Brazil)	Adeildo	1	0	0	0	0	1
10	FW	(Brazil)	Aldrovani	0	0	0	0	1	1
10	MF	(Brazil)	Cléber Santana	0	0	0	0	1	1
10	DF	(Brazil)	Érlon	1	0	0	0	0	1
10	FW	(Brazil)	Jaques	0	1	0	0	0	1
10	DF	(Brazil)	Rondinelli	1	0	0	0	0	1
10	MF	(Brazil)	Rosivaldo	1	0	0	0	0	1
10	DF	(Brazil)	Sandro Blum	1	0	0	0	0	1
10	MF	(Brazil)	Sidney	1	0	0	0	0	1
10	DF	(Brazil)	Tinho	0	0	0	0	1	1
			Own goals	0	0	0	0	1	1
			Total	62	23	5	5	24	119

== Competitions ==
=== Campeonato Pernambucano ===
==== First stage ====
20 January 2001 1	Sport	3–1	Centro Limoeirense	Recife
(UTC-3)	Marquinhos; Léomar; Rosivaldo			Stadium: Estádio Adelmar da Costa Carvalho (Ilha do Retiro)

28 January 2001 2	AGA	1–0	Sport	Garanhuns
(UTC-3)

4 February 2001 3	Vitória	1–2	Sport	Vitória de Santo Antão
(UTC-3)			Marquinhos; Irani

17 February 2001 4	Sport	5–0	Ferroviário	Recife
(UTC-3)	Leonardo; Eduardo Marques; Sandro Blum; Balão; Irani			Stadium: Estádio Adelmar da Costa Carvalho (Ilha do Retiro)

5 March 2001 5	Central	1–2	Sport	Caruaru
(UTC-3)			Léomar; Balão

8 March 2001 6	Sport	3–1	Recife	Recife
(UTC-3)	Léomar; Eduardo Marques; Irani			Stadium: Estádio Adelmar da Costa Carvalho (Ilha do Retiro)

14 March 2001 7	Sport	0–0	Porto	Recife
(UTC-3)				Stadium: Estádio Adelmar da Costa Carvalho (Ilha do Retiro)

21 March 2001 8	Náutico	2–0	Sport	Recife
(UTC-3)				Stadium: Estádio Eládio de Barros Carvalho (Aflitos)

28 March 2001 9	Sport	2–0	Santa Cruz	Recife
(UTC-3)	Leonardo; Rodrigo Gral			Stadium: Estádio Adelmar da Costa Carvalho (Ilha do Retiro)

9 April 2001 10	Centro Limoeirense	2–2	Sport	Limoeiro
(UTC-3)			Rondinelli; Gilson Batata

24 April 2001 11	Sport	3–0	AGA	Recife
(UTC-3)	Rodrigo Gral,,			Stadium: Estádio Adelmar da Costa Carvalho (Ilha do Retiro)

1 May 2001 12	Sport	6–0	Vitória	Recife
(UTC-3)	Rodrigo Gral; Leonardo, Dutra; Sidney; Gilson Batata			Stadium: Estádio Adelmar da Costa Carvalho (Ilha do Retiro)

4 May 2001 13	Ferroviário	0–0	Sport	Serra Talhada
(UTC-3)

7 May 2001 14	Sport	5–2	Central	Recife
(UTC-3)	Pedro Neto; Gilson Batata, Eduardo Marques; Valdo			Stadium: Estádio Adelmar da Costa Carvalho (Ilha do Retiro)

10 May 2001 15	Recife	0–2	Sport	Recife
(UTC-3)			Leonardo,

13 May 2001 16	Porto	1–3	Sport	Caruaru
(UTC-3)			Léomar, Gilson Batata

16 May 2001 17	Sport	1–2	Náutico	Recife
(UTC-3)	Rodrigo Gral			Stadium: Estádio Adelmar da Costa Carvalho (Ilha do Retiro)

20 May 2001 18	Santa Cruz	1–1	Sport	Recife
(UTC-3)			Rodrigo Gral	Stadium: Estádio José do Rego Maciel (Arruda)

==== Second stage ====
27 May 2001 1	Central	1–0	Sport	Caruaru
(UTC-3)

30 May 2001 2	Sport	0–1	Santa Cruz	Recife
(UTC-3)				Stadium: Estádio Adelmar da Costa Carvalho (Ilha do Retiro)

2 June 2001 3	Sport	2–2	AGA	Recife
(UTC-3)	Rodrigão,			Stadium: Estádio Adelmar da Costa Carvalho (Ilha do Retiro)

10 June 2001 4	Náutico	1–1	Sport	Recife
(UTC-3)			Leonardo	Stadium: Estádio Eládio de Barros Carvalho (Aflitos)

13 June 2001 5	Porto	0–4	Sport	Caruaru
(UTC-3)			Rodrigo Gral,, Érlon

17 June 2001 6	Sport	7–1	Central	Recife
(UTC-3)	Ricardinho; Rodrigo Gral,, Dutra; Leonardo; Valdo			Stadium: Estádio Adelmar da Costa Carvalho (Ilha do Retiro)

20 June 2001 7	Santa Cruz	2–0	Sport	Recife
(UTC-3)				Stadium: Estádio José do Rego Maciel (Arruda)

25 June 2001 8	AGA	1–1	Sport	Garanhuns
(UTC-3)			Balão

2 July 2001 9	Sport	2–0	Náutico	Recife
(UTC-3)	Gilson Batata; Ricardinho			Stadium: Estádio Adelmar da Costa Carvalho (Ilha do Retiro)

5 July 2001 10	Sport	5–2	Porto	Recife
(UTC-3)	Rodrigo Gral, Adeildo; Balão,			Stadium: Estádio Adelmar da Costa Carvalho (Ilha do Retiro)

==== Record ====
Final Position	Points	Matches	Wins	Draws	Losses	Goals For	Goals Away	Avg%
3rd	52	28	15	7	6	62	26	62%

=== Copa do Nordeste ===
==== First stage ====
17 January 2001 1	Fluminense de Feira	0–1	Sport	Feira de Santana
(UTC-3)			Juninho Rodrigues	Stadium: Estádio Alberto Oliveira (Joia da Princesa)

25 January 2001 2	Sport	0–0	CSA	Recife
(UTC-3)				Stadium: Estádio Adelmar da Costa Carvalho (Ilha do Retiro)

31 January 2001 3	Bahia	1–1	Sport	Salvador
(UTC-3)			Balão	Stadium: Complexo Esportivo Cultural Professor Octávio Mangabeira (Fonte Nova)

7 February 2001 4	Sport	2–0	Confiança	Recife
(UTC-3)	Juninho Rodrigues; Irani			Stadium: Estádio Adelmar da Costa Carvalho (Ilha do Retiro)

11 February 2001 5	Treze	1–1	Sport	Campina Grande
(UTC-3)			Pedro Neto	Stadium: Estádio Governador Ernani Sátyro (Amigão)

14 February 2001 6	Sport	1–1	Vitória	Recife
(UTC-3)	Leonardo			Stadium: Estádio Adelmar da Costa Carvalho (Ilha do Retiro)

21 February 2001 7	Santa Cruz	1–0	Sport	Recife
(UTC-3)				Stadium: Estádio José do Rego Maciel (Arruda)

28 February 2001 8	Sport	1–0	América–RN	Recife
(UTC-3)	Leonardo			Stadium: Estádio Adelmar da Costa Carvalho (Ilha do Retiro)

3 March 2001 9	Fortaleza	1–1	Sport	Fortaleza
(UTC-3)			Jaques	Stadium: Estádio Presidente Vargas

10 March 2001 10	CRB	0–1	Sport	Maceió
(UTC-3)			Leonardo	Stadium: Estádio Rei Pelé

18 March 2001 11	Sport	1–2	Náutico	Recife
(UTC-3)	Fabinho			Stadium: Estádio Adelmar da Costa Carvalho (Ilha do Retiro)

24 March 2001 12	Sergipe	2–3	Sport	Aracaju
(UTC-3)			Ricardinho, Eduardo Marques	Stadium: Estádio Lourival Baptista (Batistão)

31 March 2001 13	Sport	3–0	Ceará	Recife
(UTC-3)	Leonardo; Ricardinho; Gilson Batata			Stadium: Estádio Adelmar da Costa Carvalho (Ilha do Retiro)

7 April 2001 14	ABC	1–2	Sport	Natal
(UTC-3)			Rodrigo Gral; Ricardinho	Stadium: Estádio Dr. João Cláudio Vasconcelos Machado (Machadão)

14 April 2001 15	Sport	3–1	Botafogo–PB	Recife
(UTC-3)	Rodrigo Gral, Ricardinho			Stadium: Estádio Adelmar da Costa Carvalho (Ilha do Retiro)

==== Semi-final ====
21 April 2001	Náutico	0–1	Sport	Recife
(UTC-3)			Ricardinho 72'	Stadium: Estádio Eládio de Barros Carvalho (Aflitos); Attendance: 21,121; Referee: Wilson Souza Mendonça

==== Final ====
28 April 2001	Bahia	3–1	Sport	Salvador
(UTC-3)	Preto Casagrande 23'; Nonato 42', 75'		Léomar 57'	Stadium: Complexo Esportivo Cultural Professor Octávio Mangabeira (Fonte Nova); Attendance: 65,924; Referee: Antonio Pereira da Silva

==== Record ====
Final Position	Points	Matches	Wins	Draws	Losses	Goals For	Goals Away	Avg%
2nd	32	17	9	5	3	23	14	63%

=== Copa do Brasil ===
==== First round ====
4 April 2001	CSA	3–4	Sport	Maceió
(UTC-3)			Leonardo, Léomar; Fabinho	Stadium: Estádio Rei Pelé

11 April 2001	Sport	0–1	CSA	Recife
(UTC-3)				Stadium: Estádio Adelmar da Costa Carvalho (Ilha do Retiro)

==== Second round ====
18 April 2001	Flamengo–PI	2–0	Sport	Teresina
(UTC-3)				Stadium: Estádio Governador Alberto Tavares Silva (Albertão)

26 April 2001	Sport	1–0	Flamengo–PI	Recife
(UTC-3)	Eduardo Marques			Stadium: Estádio Adelmar da Costa Carvalho (Ilha do Retiro)

==== Record ====
Final Position	Points	Matches	Wins	Draws	Losses	Goals For	Goals Away	Avg%
23th	6	4	2	0	2	5	6	50%

=== Copa dos Campeões ===
==== Preliminary stage ====
5 June 2001	Sport	0–0	São Raimundo	Recife
21:30 (UTC-3)				Stadium: Estádio Adelmar da Costa Carvalho (Ilha do Retiro)

8 June 2001	Goiás	3–3	Sport	Goiânia
20:30 (UTC-3)			Leonardo, Rodrigo Gral	Stadium: Estádio do Governo do Estado de Goiás (Serra Dourada)

==== First stage ====
23 June 2001	São Paulo	4–2	Sport	Maceió
18:30 (UTC-3)			Dutra; Leonardo	Stadium: Estádio Rei Pelé

27 June 2001	Sport	0–5	São Paulo	João Pessoa
19:15 (UTC-3)				Stadium: Estádio José Américo de Almeida Filho (Almeidão)

==== Record ====
Final Position	Points	Matches	Wins	Draws	Losses	Goals For	Goals Away	Avg%
6th	2	4	0	2	2	5	12	16%

=== Série A ===
==== First stage ====
1 August 2001 1	Sport	1–1	Fluminense	Recife
20:30 (UTC-3)	Júnior Amorim			Stadium: Estádio Adelmar da Costa Carvalho (Ilha do Retiro)

5 August 2001 2	São Caetano	2–0	Sport	São Caetano do Sul
16:00 (UTC-3)				Stadium: Estádio Anacleto Campanella

9 August 2001 3	Portuguesa	2–1	Sport	São Paulo
20:30 (UTC-3)			Aldrovani	Stadium: Estádio Oswaldo Teixeira Duarte (Canindé)

12 August 2001 4	Sport	2–1	Grêmio	Recife
17:00 (UTC-3)	Marcelo Passos,			Stadium: Estádio Adelmar da Costa Carvalho (Ilha do Retiro)

15 August 2001 5	Flamengo	2–1	Sport	Rio de Janeiro
16:00 (UTC-3)			Edu Manga	Stadium: Estádio Jornalista Mário Filho (Maracanã)

19 August 2001 6	Sport	2–1	Corinthians	Recife
16:00 (UTC-3)	Júnior Amorim; Edu Manga			Stadium: Estádio Adelmar da Costa Carvalho (Ilha do Retiro)

26 August 2001 7	Sport	0–1	Cruzeiro	Recife
17:00 (UTC-3)				Stadium: Estádio Adelmar da Costa Carvalho (Ilha do Retiro)

29 August 2001 8	Botafogo	3–1	Sport	Rio de Janeiro
20:30 (UTC-3)			Edu Manga	Stadium: Estádio Jornalista Mário Filho (Maracanã)

1 September 2001 9	Atlético Mineiro	3–0	Sport	Belo Horizonte
17:00 (UTC-3)				Stadium: Estádio Governador Magalhães Pinto (Mineirão)

9 September 2001 10	Sport	3–3	Vasco da Gama	Recife
16:00 (UTC-3)	Edu Manga, Bóvio (o.g.)			Stadium: Estádio Adelmar da Costa Carvalho (Ilha do Retiro)

16 September 2001 11	Palmeiras	3–0	Sport	São Paulo
15:00 (UTC-3)				Stadium: Estádio Palestra Itália (Parque Antártica)

19 September 2001 12	Sport	0–2	Santos	Recife
20:30 (UTC-3)				Stadium: Estádio Adelmar da Costa Carvalho (Ilha do Retiro)

23 September 2001 13	Internacional	2–0	Sport	Porto Alegre
16:00 (UTC-3)				Stadium: Estádio José Pinheiro Borda (Beira-Rio)

30 September 2001 14	Sport	1–0	São Paulo	Recife
16:00 (UTC-3)	Fabinho			Stadium: Estádio Adelmar da Costa Carvalho (Ilha do Retiro)

3 October 2001 15	Vitória	1–0	Sport	Salvador
20:30 (UTC-3)				Stadium: Estádio Manoel Barradas (Barradão)

6 October 2001 16	Sport	1–1	Coritiba	Recife
17:00 (UTC-3)	Tinho			Stadium: Estádio Adelmar da Costa Carvalho (Ilha do Retiro)

10 October 2001 17	Goiás	2–3	Sport	Goiânia
20:30 (UTC-3)			Ricardinho, Júnior Amorim	Stadium: Estádio do Governo do Estado de Goiás (Serra Dourada)

14 October 2001 18	Sport	1–1	Juventude	Recife
17:00 (UTC-3)	Ricardinho			Stadium: Estádio Adelmar da Costa Carvalho (Ilha do Retiro)

21 October 2001 19	Sport	1–2	Santa Cruz	Recife
17:00 (UTC-3)	Fabinho			Stadium: Estádio Adelmar da Costa Carvalho (Ilha do Retiro)

27 October 2001 20	Paraná	0–1	Sport	Curitiba
16:00 (UTC-3)			Cléber Santana	Stadium: Estádio Durival Britto e Silva (Vila Capanema)

4 November 2001 21	Sport	0–1	Guarani	Recife
17:00 (UTC-3)				Stadium: Estádio Adelmar da Costa Carvalho (Ilha do Retiro)

7 November 2001 22	América–MG	3–1	Sport	Belo Horizonte
18:00 (UTC-3)			Fabinho	Stadium: Estádio Raimundo Sampaio (Independência)

10 November 2001 23	Sport	1–2	Gama	Recife
17:00 (UTC-3)	Ricardinho			Stadium: Estádio Adelmar da Costa Carvalho (Ilha do Retiro)

13 November 2001 24	Atlético Paranaense	2–1	Sport	Curitiba
20:30 (UTC-3)			Marcelo Passos	Stadium: Estádio Joaquim Américo Guimarães (Arena da Baixada)

18 November 2001 25	Sport	1–2	Botafogo–SP	Recife
17:00 (UTC-3)	Júnior Amorim			Stadium: Estádio Adelmar da Costa Carvalho (Ilha do Retiro)

25 November 2001 26	Ponte Preta	2–1	Sport	Campinas
17:00 (UTC-3)			Júnior Amorim	Stadium: Estádio Moisés Lucarelli

2 December 2001 27	Sport	0–1	Bahia	Recife
16:00 (UTC-3)				Stadium: Estádio Adelmar da Costa Carvalho (Ilha do Retiro)

==== Record ====
Final Position	Points	Matches	Wins	Draws	Losses	Goals For	Goals Away	Avg%
28th	19	27	5	4	18	24	46	23%
