= Campeonato Pernambucano Série A2 =

Football tournament in Brazil

- Organising body: FPF
- Founded: 1977; 49 years ago
- Country: Brazil
- State: Pernambuco
- Level on pyramid: 2
- Promotion to: Campeonato Pernambucano
- Relegation to: Campeonato Pernambucano Série A3
- Current champions: Vitória das Tabocas (3rd title) (2025)
- Most championships: Vera Cruz (4 titles)
- Website: FPF Official website

The Campeonato Pernambucano - Série A2 is the second tier of the professional state football league in the Brazilian state of Pernambuco. It is run by the Pernambuco Football Federation (FPF).

== List of Champions ==
Season	Champions	Runners-up
1977	Maguary (1)	Ferroviário do Recife
1978–1994	Not held	
1995	Sete de Setembro (1)	Centro Limoeirense
1996	Flamengo de Arcoverde (1)	1º de Maio
1997	Ferroviário (ST) (1)	Petrolândia
1998	Unibol (1)	Surubim
1999	Central (1)	Íbis
2000	AGA (1)	Centro Limoeirense
2001	Petrolina (1)	Intercontinental
2002	Itacuruba (1)	1º de Maio
2003	Porto (1)	Serrano
2004	Ypiranga (1)	Ramalat
2005	Estudantes (1)	Central
2006	Vera Cruz (1)	Cabense
2007	Salgueiro (1)	Sete de Setembro
2008	Vitória das Tabocas (1)	Cabense
2009	Vera Cruz (2)	Araripina
2010	Petrolina (2)	América
2011	Serra Talhada (1)	Belo Jardim
2012	Chã Grande (1)	Pesqueira
2013	Vitória das Tabocas (2)	América
2014	Vera Cruz (3)	Atlético Pernambucano
2015	Belo Jardim (1)	Vitória das Tabocas
2016	Flamengo de Arcoverde (2)	Afogados
2017	Pesqueira (1)	Decisão
2018	Petrolina (3)	Centro Limoeirense
2019	Decisão (1)	Retrô
2020	Vera Cruz (4)	Sete de Setembro
2021	Caruaru City (1)	Íbis
2022	Central (2)	Belo Jardim
2023	Afogados (1)	Vitória das Tabocas
2024	Jaguar (1)	Decisão
2025	Vitória das Tabocas (3)	América

== Titles by team ==
Teams in bold still active.

Rank	Club	Winners	Winning years
1	**Vera Cruz**	4	2006, 2009, 2014, 2020
2	**Petrolina**	3	2001, 2010, 2018
2	**Vitória das Tabocas**	3	2008, 2013, 2025
4	**Central**	2	1999, 2022
4	**Flamengo de Arcoverde**	2	1996, 2016
5	**Afogados**	1	2023
5	AGA	1	2000
5	**Belo Jardim**	1	2015
5	**Caruaru City**	1	2021
5	**Chã Grande**	1	2012
5	**Decisão**	1	2019
5	**Estudantes**	1	2005
5	Ferroviário (ST)	1	1997
5	Itacuruba	1	2002
5	**Jaguar**	1	2024
5	**Maguary**	1	1977
5	**Pesqueira**	1	2017
5	**Porto**	1	2003
5	**Salgueiro**	1	2007
5	**Serra Talhada**	1	2011
5	**Sete de Setembro**	1	1995
5	Unibol	1	1998
5	**Ypiranga**	1	2004

=== By city ===
City	Championships	Clubs
Vitória de Santo Antão	7	Vera Cruz (4), Vitória das Tabocas (3)
Caruaru	4	Central (2), Caruaru City (1), Porto (1)
Petrolina	3	Petrolina (3)
Arcoverde	2	Flamengo de Arcoverde (2)
Bonito	2	Decisão (1), Maguary (1)
Garanhuns	2	AGA (1), Sete de Setembro (1)
Serra Talhada	2	Serra Talhada (1), Ferroviário (ST) (1)
Afogados da Ingazeira	1	Afogados (1)
Belo Jardim	1	Belo Jardim (1)
Chã Grande	1	Chã Grande (1)
Itacuruba	1	Itacuruba (1)
Jaboatão dos Guararapes	1	Jaguar (1)
Paulista	1	Unibol (1)
Pesqueira	1	Pesqueira (1)
Salgueiro	1	Salgueiro (1)
Santa Cruz do Capibaribe	1	Ypiranga (1)
Timbaúba	1	Estudantes (1)

== See also ==
- Campeonato Pernambucano
- Campeonato Pernambucano Série A3
