= Preto (footballer, born January 1986) =

Brazilian footballer

Personal information
- Full name: Celismar dos Santos Marins
- Date of birth: 1 January 1986 (age 40)
- Place of birth: Salvador, Brazil
- Height: 1.90 m (6 ft 3 in)
- Position: Goalkeeper

Team information
- Current team: Vitória das Tabocas

Senior career*
Years	Team	Apps	(Gls)
2006	Catuense		
2009	Rio Bananal	16	(0)
2010	Centro Limoeirense	0	(0)
2010	Viana		
2011	URSO	5	(0)
2012	Fast Clube	2	(0)
2012	Mineiros	0	(0)
2012–2017	Vitória das Tabocas	66	(0)
2013	→ Alecrim (loan)	1	(0)
2013	→ Fast Clube (loan)	7	(0)
2014–2015	→ Bonsucesso (loan)	14	(0)
2015–2017	→ Santos (loan)	0	(0)
2020–	Vitória das Tabocas	4	(0)
- * Club domestic league appearances and goals as of 5 August 2020

Celismar dos Santos Marins (born 1 January 1986), commonly known as Preto, is a Brazilian footballer who plays as goalkeeper for Vitória das Tabocas.

== Club career ==
Born in Salvador, Bahia, Preto started his career with Catuense in 2006. After leaving the club in the following year, he stepped down from football until 2009, returning to action with Rio Bananal.

Preto rarely settled into a club in the following seasons, representing Centro Limoeirense, Viana, URSO, Fast Clube and Mineiros before joining Vitória das Tabocas in August 2012. After impressing with the latter, he returned to Fast after a short stint with Alecrim on 15 February 2013.

On 8 August 2014, Preto was loaned to Bonsucesso. Initially a backup option, he became a regular starter during the 2015 Campeonato Carioca and impressed during a match against Vasco da Gama. After the tournament's end, he signed for Santos and was immediately assigned to the newly formed B-team.

After featuring regularly with the B-side in the Copa Paulista, Preto renewed with Peixe on 17 January 2017, signing until the end of the year.

== Career statistics ==
As of 28 October 2017

Club	Season	League			State League		Cup		Continental		Other		Total	
Club	Season	Division	Apps	Goals	Apps	Goals	Apps	Goals	Apps	Goals	Apps	Goals	Apps	Goals
Rio Bananal	2009	Capixaba	—		16	0	—		—		—		16	0
Centro Limoeirense	2010	Pernambucano A2	—		0	0	—		—		—		0	0
URSO	2011	Sul-Mato-Grossense	—		5	0	—		—		—		5	0
Fast Clube	2012	Amazonense	—		2	0	—		—		—		2	0
Mineiros	2012	Goiano 2ª Divisão	—		0	0	—		—		—		0	0
Vitória das Tabocas	2012	Pernambucano A2	—		18	0	—		—		—		18	0
Vitória das Tabocas	2013	Pernambucano A2	—		23	0	—		—		—		23	0
Vitória das Tabocas	2014	Pernambucano	—		25	0	—		—		—		25	0
Vitória das Tabocas	Subtotal		—		66	0	—		—		—		66	0
Alecrim (loan)	2013	Potiguar	—		1	0	—		—		—		1	0
Fast Clube (loan)	2013	Amazonense	—		7	0	2	0	—		—		9	0
Bonsucesso (loan)	2014	Carioca	—		0	0	—		—		3 (Note: Appearance(s) in Copa Rio)	0	3	0
Bonsucesso (loan)	2015	Carioca	—		14	0	—		—		—		14	0
Bonsucesso (loan)	Subtotal		—		14	0	—		—		3	0	17	0
Santos (loan)	2016	Série A	0	0	—		0	0	—		10 (Note: Appearance(s) in Copa Paulista)	0	10	0
Santos (loan)	2017	Série A	0	0	—		0	0	—		17	0	17	0
Santos (loan)	Subtotal		0	0	—		0	0	—		27	0	27	0
Career total			—		111	0	2	0	—		30	0	143	0

== Honours ==
Vitória das Tabocas

- Campeonato Pernambucano Série A2: 2013
