= Raykar =

Brazilian footballer

Personal information
- Full name: Raykar dos Santos Campos
- Date of birth: 19 July 1997 (age 29)
- Height: 1.91 m (6 ft 3 in)
- Position: Defender

Team information
- Current team: Duhok SC
- Number: 13

Senior career*
Years	Team	Apps	(Gls)
2020	Decisão	5	(0)
2020	1º de Maio		
2021	Vera Cruz-PE		
2021–2024	Petrolina	41	(1)
2023	→ Juazeiro (loan)	9	(0)
2024–2025	Al-Shabab		
2025–2026	Al-Anwar	30	(3)
2026–	Duhok SC		
- * Club domestic league appearances and goals as of 16:14, 24 November 2021 (UTC)

Raykar dos Santos Campos (born 19 July 1997), commonly known as Raykar, is a Brazilian footballer who currently plays as a defender for Duhok SC.

On 24 June 2026, Raykar joined Iraqi First Division club Duhok SC.

== Career statistics ==
=== Club ===
As of 3 July 2026.

Club	Season	League			State League		Cup		Other		Total	
Club	Season	Division	Apps	Goals	Apps	Goals	Apps	Goals	Apps	Goals	Apps	Goals
Decisão	2020	–			5 (Note: Appearances in the Campeonato Pernambucano)	0	0	0	0	0	5	0
Petrolina	2021	–			10 (Note: Appearances in the Campeonato Pernambucano Série A2)	0	0	0	0	0	10	0
Career total			0	0	15	0	0	0	0	0	15	0
