= Romário (footballer, born 1998) =

Brazilian footballer

Personal information
- Full name: Romário Porto Valença
- Date of birth: 25 January 1998 (age 28)
- Position: Midfielder

Team information
- Current team: Decisão

Youth career
- –2019: Afogados da Ingazeira

Senior career*
Years	Team	Apps	(Gls)
2019	Afogados da Ingazeira	1	(0)
2019	Íbis	11	(1)
2020–	Decisão	3	(0)
- * Club domestic league appearances and goals as of 16:14, 7 August 2020 (UTC)

Romário Porto Valença (born 25 January 1998) is a Brazilian footballer who currently plays as a midfielder for Decisão.

== Career statistics ==
=== Club ===
As of 7 August 2020.

Club	Season	League			State League		Cup		Other		Total	
Club	Season	Division	Apps	Goals	Apps	Goals	Apps	Goals	Apps	Goals	Apps	Goals
Afogados da Ingazeira	2019	–			1 (Note: Appearances in the Campeonato Pernambucano)	0	0	0	0	0	1	0
Íbis	2019	–			11 (Note: Appearances in the Campeonato Pernambucano Série A2)	1	0	0	0	0	11	1
Decisão	2020	–			3	0	0	0	0	0	3	0
Career total			0	0	15	1	0	0	0	0	15	1
