= Ricardo Felipe =

Brazilian footballer

Personal information
- Full name: Ricardo Felipe da Silva
- Date of birth: 31 March 1999 (age 27)
- Position: Midfielder

Team information
- Current team: Decisão

Youth career
- –2018: Porto-PE

Senior career*
Years	Team	Apps	(Gls)
2019–	Decisão	23	(0)
- * Club domestic league appearances and goals as of 16:14, 7 August 2020 (UTC)

Ricardo Felipe da Silva (born 31 March 1999) is a Brazilian footballer who plays as a midfielder for Decisão.

== Career statistics ==
As of 7 August 2020

Club	Season	League			State League		Cup		Other		Total	
Club	Season	Division	Apps	Goals	Apps	Goals	Apps	Goals	Apps	Goals	Apps	Goals
Decisão	2019	–			13 (Note: Appearances in the Campeonato Pernambucano Série A2)	0	0	0	0	0	13	0
Decisão	2020	–			10 (Note: Appearances in the Campeonato Pernambucano)	0	0	0	0	0	10	0
Career total			0	0	23	0	0	0	0	0	23	0
