= Djalma (footballer, born 1975) =

Brazilian footballer

Personal information
- Full name: Djalma Henrique da Silva
- Date of birth: 24 November 1975 (age 50)
- Place of birth: Nazaré da Mata, Brazil
- Height: 1.73 m (5 ft 8 in)
- Position: Midfielder

Senior career*
Years	Team	Apps	(Gls)
2000	Sport Recife		
2000–2001	Estrela da Amadora	28	(5)
2002–2003	Sport Recife	?	(?)
2004	Santa Cruz	?	(0)
2004–2005	Paços de Ferreira	25	(7)
2005	Gama	?	(0)
2006	Estudantes	NA	
2006–2007	Central	NA	
2007–2008	Cherno More	10	(0)
2008	→ Pinhalnovense (loan)	14	(1)
2008–2009	Central	?	(?)
2009	Centro Limoeirense		
2010	Crato		
2010	Tiradentes		
2010	Timbaúba		
2011	Crato		
2011	Timbaúba		
2012	Crato		
- * Club domestic league appearances and goals

Djalma Henrique da Silva (born 24 November 1975), known as just Djalma, is a former Brazilian footballer.

== Biography ==
=== Portugal ===
Djalma briefly played for Estrela da Amadora. In January 2002, he was back to Brazil for Sport Recife.

He then played for cross-town rival Santa Cruz, and left for Portugal again for Paços de Ferreira on 13 August 2004. With Rincón, Júnior and Djalma, the team won Liga de Honra and returned to Portuguese Liga.

=== Return to Brazil ===
Djalma was signed by Gama on 26 July 2005 for the remainder of Campeonato Brasileiro Série B.

=== Bulgaria ===
On 6 July 2007, he was signed by PFC Cherno More Varna in the A PFG. and remained with the team until early 2008.

=== Late career ===
In July 2008, he signed a one-year contract with Central Sport Club, for Campeonato Brasileiro Série C.

In May 2009, he signed a 4-month contract with Centro Limoeirense, for Copa Pernambuco. In 2010, he played for Crato for 2010 Campeonato Cearense and moved to Tiradentes in March. In May, he was signed by Timbaúba in the Campeonato Pernambucano Série A2. In December 2010 he returned to Crato. In May, he once again moved to Timbaúba. In December 2011 he was signed by Crato for the third time.

== Honours ==
- Liga de Honra: 2005
