= Edivaldo =

Edivaldo is a Portuguese given name. It may refer to:

- Edivaldo Alves de Santa Rosa (1934–2002) Brazilian footballer commonly known as Dida
- Edivaldo Martins Fonseca (1962–1993), Brazilian footballer
- Edivaldo Medeiros da Silva (born 1974), Brazilian footballer
- Edivaldo Monteiro (born 1976), Portuguese athlete, competitor at the 2004 Summer Olympics
- Edivaldo Holanda Júnior (born 1978), Brazilian lawyer and politician
- Edivaldo Hermoza (born 1985), Brazilian–Bolivian footballer

== See also ==
- Edvaldo (disambiguation)
