= Balao (disambiguation) =

Balao is a town in Ecuador. It may also refer to:

- USS Balao
- Balao-class submarines
- Hemiramphus balao, a fish
- Balão Mágico, a Brazilian children's show
- Turma do Balão Mágico, a Brazilian children's music group that starred on the TV show
- Balão (footballer, born 1975), Sandro Júnior Cavalcante da Costa, Brazilian footballer.
- Balão (footballer, born 2003), João Victor de Amorim Marinho, Brazilian footballer.
