= Edvaldo =

Edvaldo is a given name. It may refer to:

- Edvaldo Alves de Santa Rosa (1934-2002), known as Dida, Brazilian football attacking midfielder
- Edvaldo Izidio Neto (1934-2002), known as Vavá, Brazilian football striker
- Edvaldo Oliveira (born 1963), Brazilian boxer
- Edvaldo Santos (born 1966), Brazilian weightlifter
- Edvaldo (footballer, born 1966), Edvaldo Teles Alves, Brazilian football forward
- Edvaldo (footballer, born 1974), Edvaldo Gonçalves Pereira, Brazilian football striker
- Edvaldo Valério (born 1978), Brazilian swimmer
- Edvaldo Gonzaga (born 1982), Brazilian boxer
- Edvaldo Ferreira (born 1990), Angolan handball player

== See also ==
- Edivaldo
