= Unibol Pernambuco Futebol Clube =

Unibol
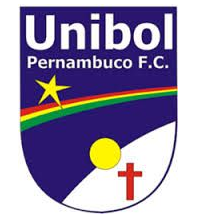
- Full name: Unibol Pernambuco Futebol Clube
- Founded: September 16, 1996 (28 years ago)
- Ground: Estádio Ademir Cunha, Paulista, Pernambuco state, Brazil
- Capacity: 7,000
Home colors	Away colors

Unibol Pernambuco Futebol Clube, commonly known as Unibol, is a Brazilian football club based in Paulista, Pernambuco state.

== History ==
The club was founded on September 12, 1996. They won the Campeonato Pernambucano Second Level in 1998, finishing ahead of Surubim.

== Achievements ==
- Campeonato Pernambucano Second Level:
  - Winners (1): 1998

== Stadium ==
Unibol Pernambuco Futebol Clube play their home games at Estádio Ademir Cunha. The stadium has a maximum capacity of 7,000 people.
