= Decisão Goiana Futebol Clube =

Decisão
- Full name: Decisão Goiana Futebol Clube
- Nickname: Falcão do Agreste
- Founded: October 28, 1996; 29 years ago
- Ground: José Dionísio do Carmo
- Capacity: 6,100
- President: Epitácio Andrade
- Head coach: Nilson
- League: Campeonato Brasileiro Série D Campeonato Pernambucano
- 2025: Pernambucano, 6th of 10
Home colours	Away colours

Decisão Goiana Futebol Clube, formerly Decisão Sertânia Futebol Clube and Sociedade Esportiva Decisão Futebol Clube, commonly known as Decisão, is a Brazilian football club based in Goiana, Pernambuco. They compete in the Campeonato Pernambucano.

== History ==
Club logo used in 2020

Initially established in Recife since their foundation, Decisão played in several cities during their first professional years, before merging with Sertânia Futebol Clube in 2022, changing name to Decisão Sertânia Futebol Clube and moving to the city of Sertânia in 2022. In September 2025, the club left the city of Sertânia and moved to Goiana (a city where he already hosted matches in the past), and changed name to Decisão Goiana Futebol Clube.

== Squad ==
Note: Flags indicate national team as defined under FIFA eligibility rules; some limited exceptions apply. Players may hold more than one non-FIFA nationality.

No.	Pos.	Nation	Player
—	GK	BRA	Keu
—	GK	BRA	Marcão
—	GK	BRA	Henrique
—	GK	BRA	João Victor
—	DF	BRA	Weslley (on loan from Santa Cruz)
—	DF	BRA	Kaio
—	DF	BRA	Victor Luna
—	DF	BRA	Felipe Almeida
—	DF	BRA	Alenilson
—	DF	BRA	Rafael
—	DF	BRA	Éverton
—	DF	BRA	Raykar
—	DF	BRA	Thiago Recife
—	DF	BRA	Danilo Cirqueira
—	MF	BRA	Vágner Rosa
—	MF	BRA	Romário

No.	Pos.	Nation	Player
—	MF	BRA	José
—	MF	BRA	Victor Sandes
—	MF	BRA	Samuel Sousa
—	MF	BRA	Willams da Luz
—	MF	BRA	Luan
—	MF	BRA	Madson
—	MF	BRA	Ricardo Felipe
—	MF	BRA	Aruá
—	MF	BRA	Kady
—	FW	BRA	Rafinha
—	FW	BRA	Josy
—	FW	BRA	Jonathan Bryan
—	FW	BRA	Nickson
—	FW	BRA	Leonardo Gaúcho (on loan from Santa Cruz)
—	FW	BRA	Kelvis
—	FW	BRA	Jackson

== Achievements ==
- Campeonato Pernambucano A2:
  - Winners (1): 2019
  - Runners up (1): 2017
- Copa Pernambuco:
  - Runners up (1): 2001
