= 2006 Campeonato Brasileiro Série C =

Campeonato Brasileiro Série C
- Season: 2006
- Champions: Criciúma
- Promoted: Criciúma; Vitória; Ipatinga; Grêmio Barueri
- Matches played: 386
- Goals scored: 1,059 (2.74 per match)
- Top goalscorer: Sorato (Bahia) - 10 goals
- Biggest home win: América Mineiro 9-0 Jataiense (August 20, 2006)
- Biggest away win: União Barbarense 0-6 Rio Branco-SP (July 19, 2006)

The 2006 Campeonato Brasileiro Série C, the third division of the Brazilian League, was contested by 63 clubs, four of which eventually qualified to the second division to be contested in 2007. No teams were relegated, since there was no fourth division in the Brazilian league.

== Competition format ==
=== First stage ===
The 63 teams play in 15 groups of four and one group of three teams (because the Football Federation of Acre failed to appoint one affiliated team). Within each group, the four teams play a double round robin, i.e. they play each other in home and away matches, totalling six matchdays. The two best ranked teams in each group qualify to the Second Stage.

=== Second stage ===
The 32 teams qualified from the First Stage play in eight groups of four. Within each group, the four teams play a double round robin, i.e. they play each other in home and away matches, totalling six matchdays. The two best ranked teams in each group qualify to the Third Stage.

=== Third stage ===
The 16 teams qualified from the Second Stage play in four groups of four. Within each group, the four teams play a double round robin, i.e. they play each other in home and away matches, totalling six matchdays. The two best ranked teams in each group qualify to the Final Stage.

=== Final Stage ===
The eight teams qualified from the Third Stage are put together in a single group. They play a double round robin, i.e. they play each other in home and away matches, totalling fourteen matchdays. The four best ranked teams are automatically promoted to the Série B in 2007.

== Participating teams ==
The participating teams are sorted by state:

Acre
- ADESG

Alagoas
- Coruripe
- CSA

Amapá
- Amapá

Amazonas
- Fast Clube
- Rio Negro

Bahia
- Bahia
- Colo-Colo
- Ipitanga
- Vitória

Ceará
- Ferroviário
- Icasa

Distrito Federal
- Ceilândia
- Luziânia

Espírito Santo
- Estrela do Norte
- Vitória (ES)

Goiás
- Anapolina
- Atlético Goianiense
- Jataiense

Maranhão
- Imperatriz
- Maranhão

Mato Grosso
- Mixto
- Operário

Mato Grosso do Sul
- Coxim
- SERC

Minas Gerais
- América (MG)
- Ipatinga
- Ituiutaba

Pará
- Ananindeua
- Tuna Luso

Paraíba
- Treze
- Botafogo (PB)

Paraná
- ADAP
- J. Malucelli
- Rio Branco (PR)

Pernambuco
- Porto
- Ypiranga

Piauí
- Flamengo
- River

Rio de Janeiro
- América (RJ)
- Americano
- Cabofriense
- Madureira

Rio Grande do Norte
- Baraúnas
- Potiguar de Mossoró

Rio Grande do Sul
- Brasil
- Caxias
- Novo Hamburgo
- Ulbra (RS)

Rondônia
- Ulbra (RO)

Roraima
- São Raimundo (RR)

Santa Catarina
- Criciúma
- Joinville
- Marcílio Dias

São Paulo
- América
- Grêmio Barueri
- Juventus
- Noroeste
- Rio Branco (SP)
- União Barbarense

Sergipe
- Confiança
- Pirambu

Tocantins
- Araguaína

== Stages of the competition ==
=== First stage ===
Group 1 (AC-AM-PA)

Pos	Team	Pld	W	D	L	GF	GA	GD	Pts	Qualification
1	(Pará) Tuna Luso	4	3	1	0	9	4	+5	10	Promoted to the second stage
2	(Amazonas (Brazilian state)) Rio Negro/AM	4	1	1	2	7	8	−1	4	Promoted to the second stage
3	(Acre (state)) ADESG	4	1	0	3	3	7	−4	3	

Group 2 (AP-AM-PA-RR)

Pos	Team	Pld	W	D	L	GF	GA	GD	Pts	Qualification
1	(Amazonas (Brazilian state)) Fast Clube	6	4	1	1	7	3	+4	13	Promoted to the second stage
2	(Pará) Ananindeua	6	3	1	2	12	8	+4	10	Promoted to the second stage
3	Amapá	6	1	2	3	7	11	−4	5	
4	(Roraima) São-Raimundo/RR	6	1	2	3	5	9	−4	5	

Group 3 (MT-RO-TO)

Pos	Team	Pld	W	D	L	GF	GA	GD	Pts	Qualification
1	(Mato Grosso) Operário/MT	6	2	3	1	8	6	+2	9	Promoted to the second stage
2	(Mato Grosso) Mixto	6	2	3	1	6	6	0	9	Promoted to the second stage
3	(Tocantins) Araguaína	6	2	1	3	6	8	−2	7	
4	(Rondônia) Ulbra/RO	6	1	3	2	7	7	0	0 (Note: 6 points deducted for fielding an ineligible player)	

Notes:

Group 4 (MA-PI)

Pos	Team	Pld	W	D	L	GF	GA	GD	Pts	Qualification
1	(Piauí) Ríver/PI	6	4	1	1	12	4	+8	13	Promoted to the second stage
2	Maranhão	6	3	1	2	8	6	+2	10	Promoted to the second stage
3	(Maranhão) Imperatriz	6	2	2	2	6	4	+2	8	
4	(Piauí) Flamengo/PI	6	0	2	4	3	15	−12	2	

Group 5 (CE-PB-PE-RN)

Pos	Team	Pld	W	D	L	GF	GA	GD	Pts	Qualification
1	(Ceará) Icasa	6	3	3	0	13	7	+6	12	Promoted to the second stage
2	(Pernambuco) Porto	6	3	2	1	10	8	+2	11	Promoted to the second stage
3	(Rio Grande do Norte) Baraúnas	6	1	2	3	8	12	−4	5	
4	(Paraíba) Botafogo/PB	6	1	1	4	8	12	−4	4	

Group 6 (CE-PB-PE-RN)

Pos	Team	Pld	W	D	L	GF	GA	GD	Pts	Qualification
1	(Ceará) Ferroviário/CE	6	3	1	2	9	9	0	10	Promoted to the second stage
2	(Paraíba) Treze	6	2	3	1	7	5	+2	9	Promoted to the second stage
3	(Rio Grande do Norte) Potiguar (Mossoró)	6	2	2	2	6	3	+3	8	
4	(Pernambuco) Ypiranga/PE	6	1	2	3	6	11	−5	−1 (Note: 6 points deducted for fielding an ineligible player)	

Notes:

Group 7 (AL-BA-SE)

Pos	Team	Pld	W	D	L	GF	GA	GD	Pts	Qualification
1	Bahia	6	4	1	1	12	7	+5	13	Promoted to the second stage
2	(Sergipe) Confiança/SE	6	2	3	1	8	7	+1	9	Promoted to the second stage
3	(Alagoas) CSA	6	1	2	3	8	10	−2	5	
4	(Bahia) Colo-Colo	6	1	2	3	8	12	−4	5	

Group 8 (AL-BA-SE)

Pos	Team	Pld	W	D	L	GF	GA	GD	Pts	Qualification
1	(Bahia) Vitória/BA	6	3	2	1	11	6	+5	11	Promoted to the second stage
2	(Alagoas) Coruripe	6	3	2	1	9	7	+2	11	Promoted to the second stage
3	(Sergipe) Olímpico Pirambu	6	2	1	3	8	9	−1	7	
4	(Bahia) Ipitanga	6	1	1	4	5	11	−6	4	

Group 9 (DF-GO-MS)

Pos	Team	Pld	W	D	L	GF	GA	GD	Pts	Qualification
1	(Goiás) Jataiense	6	3	3	0	12	6	+6	12	Promoted to the second stage
2	(Goiás) Anapolina	6	2	4	0	13	6	+7	10	Promoted to the second stage
3	(Federal District (Brazil)) Luziânia	6	1	1	4	5	15	−10	4	
4	(Mato Grosso do Sul) Coxim	6	0	4	2	4	7	−3	4	

Group 10 (DF-GO-MS-MG)

Pos	Team	Pld	W	D	L	GF	GA	GD	Pts	Qualification
1	(Minas Gerais) Ituiutaba	6	4	1	1	8	2	+6	11 (Note: 2 points deducted?)	Promoted to the second stage
2	(Goiás) Atlético/GO	6	2	2	2	6	6	0	8	Promoted to the second stage
3	(Mato Grosso do Sul) SER Chapadão	6	2	1	3	3	5	−2	7	
4	(Federal District (Brazil)) Ceilândia	6	2	0	4	5	9	−4	0 (Note: 6 points deducted for fielding an ineligible player)	

Notes:

Group 11 (ES-MG-RJ-SP)

Pos	Team	Pld	W	D	L	GF	GA	GD	Pts	Qualification
1	(Minas Gerais) América-MG	6	5	0	1	10	4	+6	15	Promoted to the second stage
2	(São Paulo (state)) Grêmio Barueri	6	4	1	1	7	4	+3	13	Promoted to the second stage
3	(Espírito Santo) Vitória/ES	6	1	2	3	5	9	−4	5	
4	(Rio de Janeiro (state)) América/RJ	6	0	2	4	4	9	−5	2	

Group 12 (ES-MG-RJ-SP)

Pos	Team	Pld	W	D	L	GF	GA	GD	Pts	Qualification
1	(Rio de Janeiro (state)) Americano	6	4	2	0	9	5	+4	14	Promoted to the second stage
2	(Minas Gerais) Ipatinga	6	3	1	2	6	4	+2	10	Promoted to the second stage
3	(São Paulo (state)) Juventus/SP	6	1	1	4	7	9	−2	4	
4	(Espírito Santo) Estrela do Norte	6	2	0	4	5	9	−4	−12 (Note: 18 points deducted for fielding 3 ineligible players)	

Notes:

Group 13 (RJ-SP)

Pos	Team	Pld	W	D	L	GF	GA	GD	Pts	Qualification
1	(Rio de Janeiro (state)) Cabofriense	6	3	2	1	10	6	+4	11	Promoted to the second stage
2	(São Paulo (state)) Rio Branco/SP	6	3	1	2	13	8	+5	10	Promoted to the second stage
3	(Rio de Janeiro (state)) Madureira	6	2	1	3	8	7	+1	7	
4	(São Paulo (state)) União Agrícola Barbarense	6	2	0	4	5	15	−10	6	

Group 14 (PR-SP)

Pos	Team	Pld	W	D	L	GF	GA	GD	Pts	Qualification
1	(Paraná (state)) J. Malucelli	6	3	1	2	8	4	+4	10	Promoted to the second stage
2	(São Paulo (state)) Noroeste	6	2	3	1	5	5	0	9	Promoted to the second stage
3	(Paraná (state)) ADAP	6	1	4	1	4	5	−1	7	
4	(São Paulo (state)) América/SP	6	1	2	3	4	7	−3	5	

Group 15 (PR-RS-SC)

Pos	Team	Pld	W	D	L	GF	GA	GD	Pts	Qualification
1	(Santa Catarina (state)) Joinville	6	3	2	1	8	4	+4	11	Promoted to the second stage
2	(Rio Grande do Sul) Ulbra/RS	6	2	4	0	7	5	+2	10	Promoted to the second stage
3	(Rio Grande do Sul) Caxias/RS	6	2	1	3	8	7	+1	7	
4	(Paraná (state)) Rio Branco/PR	6	1	1	4	3	10	−7	4	

Group 16 (RS-SC)

Pos	Team	Pld	W	D	L	GF	GA	GD	Pts	Qualification
1	(Rio Grande do Sul) Brasil (Pelotas)	6	5	0	1	10	8	+2	15	Promoted to the second stage
2	(Santa Catarina (state)) Criciúma	6	4	1	1	20	9	+11	13	Promoted to the second stage
3	(Rio Grande do Sul) Novo Hamburgo	6	2	1	3	7	14	−7	7	
4	(Santa Catarina (state)) Marcílio Dias	6	0	0	6	7	13	−6	0	

=== Second stage ===
Group 17 (MA-MT-PA)

Pos	Team	Pld	W	D	L	GF	GA	GD	Pts	Qualification
1	(Pará) Ananindeua	6	3	2	1	12	8	+4	11	Promoted to the third stage
2	(Pará) Tuna Luso	6	3	1	2	10	8	+2	10	Promoted to the third stage
3	Maranhão	6	2	1	3	12	12	0	7	
3	(Mato Grosso) Operário/MT	6	1	2	3	8	14	−6	5	

Group 18 (AM-MT-PI)

Pos	Team	Pld	W	D	L	GF	GA	GD	Pts	Qualification
1	(Piauí) Ríver/PI	6	3	2	1	9	4	+5	11	Promoted to the third stage
2	(Amazonas (Brazilian state)) Rio Negro/AM	6	2	2	2	4	7	−3	8	Promoted to the third stage
3	(Amazonas (Brazilian state)) Fast Clube	6	2	1	3	10	8	+2	7	
4	(Mato Grosso) Mixto	6	1	3	2	4	5	−1	6	

Group 19 (AL-BA-CE-PB)

Pos	Team	Pld	W	D	L	GF	GA	GD	Pts	Qualification
1	Bahia	6	4	0	2	12	10	+2	12	Promoted to the third stage
2	(Paraíba) Treze	6	2	2	2	10	9	+1	8	Promoted to the third stage
3	(Alagoas) Coruripe	6	2	1	3	8	10	−2	7	
4	(Ceará) Icasa	6	1	3	2	10	11	−1	6	

Group 20 (BA-CE-PB-SE)

Pos	Team	Pld	W	D	L	GF	GA	GD	Pts	Qualification
1	(Bahia) Vitória/BA	6	4	0	2	14	6	+8	12	Promoted to the third stage
2	(Ceará) Ferroviário/CE	6	3	2	1	10	9	+1	11	Promoted to the third stage
3	(Sergipe) Confiança/SE	6	1	2	3	7	11	−4	5	
4	(Pernambuco) Porto	6	1	2	3	4	9	−5	5	

Group 21 (GO-MG)

Pos	Team	Pld	W	D	L	GF	GA	GD	Pts	Qualification
1	(Minas Gerais) Ipatinga	6	4	0	2	11	5	+6	12	Promoted to the third stage
2	(Minas Gerais) América/MG	6	3	1	2	13	5	+8	10	Promoted to the third stage
3	(Goiás) Atlético/GO	6	2	2	2	7	7	0	8	
4	(Goiás) Jataiense	6	1	1	4	6	20	−14	4	

Group 22 (GO-MG-RJ-SP)

Pos	Team	Pld	W	D	L	GF	GA	GD	Pts	Qualification
1	(São Paulo (state)) Grêmio Barueri	6	4	0	2	11	7	+4	12	Promoted to the third stage
2	(Goiás) Anapolina	6	3	1	2	8	8	0	10	Promoted to the third stage
3	(Minas Gerais) Ituiutaba	6	2	1	3	8	10	−2	7	
4	(Rio de Janeiro (state)) Americano	8	2	0	6	8	10	−2	6	

Group 23 (RJ-SC-SP)

Pos	Team	Pld	W	D	L	GF	GA	GD	Pts	Qualification
1	(São Paulo (state)) Noroeste	6	3	1	2	9	5	+4	10	Promoted to the third stage
2	(Santa Catarina (state)) Criciúma	6	3	1	2	10	9	+1	10	Promoted to the third stage
3	(Santa Catarina (state)) Joinville	6	3	0	3	12	10	+2	9	
4	(Rio de Janeiro (state)) Cabofriense	6	2	0	4	8	15	−7	6	

Group 24 (PR-RS-SP)

Pos	Team	Pld	W	D	L	GF	GA	GD	Pts	Qualification
1	(Paraná (state)) J. Malucelli	6	3	3	0	9	6	+3	12	Promoted to the third stage
2	(Rio Grande do Sul) Brasil (Pelotas)	6	3	1	2	6	3	+3	10	Promoted to the third stage
3	(Rio Grande do Sul) Ulbra/RS	6	1	3	2	4	7	−3	6	
4	(São Paulo (state)) Rio Branco/SP	6	0	3	3	2	5	−3	3	

=== Third stage ===
Group 25 (AM-BA-CE-PA)

Pos	Team	Pld	W	D	L	GF	GA	GD	Pts	Qualification
1	Bahia/BA	6	4	1	1	7	4	+3	13	Promoted to the final stage
2	(Ceará) Ferroviário/CE	6	2	2	2	9	8	+1	8	Promoted to the final stage
3	(Pará) Ananindeua/PA	6	4	1	1	14	4	+10	7 (Note: 6 points deducted for fielding an ineligible player)	
4	(Amazonas (Brazilian state)) Rio Negro/AM	6	0	0	6	2	16	−14	0	

Notes:

Group 26 (BA-PA-PB-PI)

Pos	Team	Pld	W	D	L	GF	GA	GD	Pts	Qualification
1	(Bahia) Vitória/BA	6	3	2	1	13	9	+4	11	Promoted to the final stage
2	(Paraíba) Treze/PB	6	3	2	1	6	5	+1	11	Promoted to the final stage
3	(Pará) Tuna Luso/PA	6	3	0	3	11	9	+2	9	
4	(Piauí) River/PI	6	1	0	5	8	15	−7	3	

Group 27 (GO-MG-RS-SP)

Pos	Team	Pld	W	D	L	GF	GA	GD	Pts	Qualification
1	(Minas Gerais) Ipatinga/MG	6	4	0	2	10	6	+4	12	Promoted to the final stage
2	(Rio Grande do Sul) Brasil/RS	6	3	2	1	8	7	+1	11	Promoted to the final stage
3	(São Paulo (state)) Noroeste/SP	6	2	1	3	10	11	−1	7	
4	(Goiás) Anapolina/GO	6	0	3	3	5	9	−4	3	

Group 28 (MG-PR-SC-SP)

Pos	Team	Pld	W	D	L	GF	GA	GD	Pts	Qualification
1	(São Paulo (state)) Grêmio Barueri/SP	6	4	0	2	10	9	+1	12	Promoted to the final stage
2	(Santa Catarina (state)) Criciúma/SC	6	3	1	2	7	4	+3	10	Promoted to the final stage
3	(Minas Gerais) América/MG	6	2	2	2	9	8	+1	8	
4	(Paraná (state)) J.Malucelli/PR	6	0	3	3	3	8	−5	3	

=== Final stage ===
Group 29 (BA-CE-MG-PB-RS-SC-SP)

Pos	Team	Pld	W	D	L	GF	GA	GD	Pts	Promotion
1	(Santa Catarina (state)) Criciúma/SC	14	9	4	1	27	11	+16	31	Promoted to the Série B in 2007
2	(Bahia) Vitória/BA	14	8	1	5	23	18	+5	25	Promoted to the Série B in 2007
3	(Minas Gerais) Ipatinga/MG	14	7	3	4	21	15	+6	24	Promoted to the Série B in 2007
4	(São Paulo (state)) Grêmio Barueri/SP	14	7	2	5	27	22	+5	23	Promoted to the Série B in 2007
5	(Ceará) Ferroviário/CE	14	6	1	7	21	26	−5	19	
6	Bahia/BA	14	4	2	8	21	30	−9	14	
7	(Rio Grande do Sul) Brasil/RS	14	4	1	9	16	25	−9	13	
8	(Paraíba) Treze/PB	14	3	2	9	17	26	−9	11	
