= Mauro Shampoo =

Brazilian association football player

Mauro Teixeira Thorpe (born 20 November 1956) is a Brazilian former footballer who is last known to have played as a midfielder for Íbis.

== Playing career ==
Shampoo played for Brazilian side Íbis for ten years.

== Post-playing career ==
After retirement from professional football, Shampoo worked as a hairdresser.

== In popular culture ==
Shampoo has a film about him called Mauro Shampoo – jogador, cabeleireiro e homem. He has also been mentioned on the FIFA's Official YouTube Channel, in a video titled "Left-footed, cool hair, number 10".

== Personal life ==
Shampoo has thirteen siblings.
