= Íbis Sport Club =

Íbis
- Full name: Íbis Sport Club
- Nicknames: Pior Time do Mundo (The Worst Team in the World); Pássaro Preto (Black Birds)
- Founded: 15 November 1938
- Ground: Municipal de Paulista, Paulista, Brazil
- Capacity: 10,000
- President: Ozir Ramos
- Head coach: Carlos Alberto
- League: Campeonato Pernambucano
- 2022: 9th, 5th (relegation round)
Home colors	Away colors

Íbis Sport Club, or Íbis as they are usually called, are a Brazilian football team from Paulista in Pernambuco state, founded on 15 November 1938. Their home stadium is the Municipal de Paulista. They play in black and red colors. Íbis are one of the founders of the Pernambuco Football Federation.

The club is known for its epithet of the "Worst Team in the World" after a long losing streak in the late 1970s and 1980s. The club has used this reputation to promote itself.

== History ==
Íbis Sport Club were founded on 15 November 1938 by employees of Tecelagem de Seda e Algodão ("Silk and Cotton Weaving Factory"), owned by João Pessoa de Queiroz, and located in Santo Amaro. Initially only employees of that company could play. The club were named Íbis after the African bird. After the death of João Pessoa de Queiroz, who was the club's owner, his heirs lost interest in the club, then one of the company's managers, Onildo Ramos adopted Íbis. Íbis, under Onildo Ramos administration, started to accept non-employees of Tecelagem de Seda e Algodão as players.

While the Pernambuco Football Federation was founded on 16 June 1915 as Liga Sportiva Pernambucana, only in 1955 it was renamed to its current name. Íbis is considered by the organization as one of its founders.

Íbis won the Torneio Início in 1948 and in 1950, and the Torneio Incentivo in 1975 and in 1976. Carlito of Íbis, with 12 goals, was the Campeonato Pernambucano's top goal scorer in 1948. The team are commonly known as the "Worst Team of the World" due to their several defeats in the late 1970s and early 1980s. The club spent three years and eleven months between 1980 and 1984 without winning a game. Íbis were the runners-up of the Campeonato Pernambucano Second Level in 1999, when they were defeated by Central in the final. After celebrating their 70th birthday on 15 November 2008, the club started a project to become a private company, with the help of Portuguese entrepreneur Filipe Fernandes. R$15 million will be invested in building a training center.

In the late 1970s and early 1980s, Íbis gained worldwide fame for its poor results on the field. Thanks to nine consecutive defeats and then a sequence of 23 games without a win, it achieved national fame. It was three years and eleven months without celebrating a single victory, a record included in the Guinness Book of Records. It became well known to reporters at the time as the worst team in the world.

Íbis has a rivalry with Associação Desportiva Jaboatão dos Guararapes. In the same spirit as the club calling itself the worst team in the world, the rivalry is known as the Pior Clássico do Mundo (Worst Derby in the World). Íbis won six of the first eight fixtures against the club founded in 2012; in 2024 Íbis was relegated to the third tier while Jaguar won the title and promotion to the top flight.

== Notable players ==
- (Brazil) Mauro Shampoo

== Honours ==
- Campeonato Pernambucano Série A2
  - Runners-up (2): 1999, 2021
- Torneio Incentivo
  - Winners (2): 1975, 1976
- Torneio Início de Pernambuco
  - Winners (2): 1948, 1950
