= Jaílson (footballer, born June 1981) =

Brazilian footballer

Personal information
- Full name: Jaílson Alexandre Alves dos Santos
- Date of birth: 16 June 1981 (age 45)
- Place of birth: Caruaru, Brazil
- Height: 1.79 m (5 ft 10 in)
- Positions: Attacking midfielder; striker

Youth career
- 2001: Porto de Caruaru

Senior career*
Years	Team	Apps	(Gls)
2002–2003	Santa Cruz		
2003	Marília		
2004	Sport		
2004	→ Vitória de Guimarães (loan)		
2004	CRB		
2005	Caldense		
2006	Paulista	30	(17)
2007	Corinthians	0	(0)
2007	→ Rubin Kazan (loan)	7	(0)
2007–2008	Benfica	0	(0)
2007–2008	→ Braga (loan)	26	(2)
2008	Coritiba	4	(0)
2009	Atlético Goianiense	6	(1)
2009	Olhanense	0	(0)
2009–2010	Ermis Aradippou	2	(0)
2010–2011	Vitória de Setúbal	20	(4)
2012	Boa	0	(0)
2012–2013	Fortaleza	14	(5)
2013	Icasa	8	(0)
2013	Treze	6	(0)
2014–2015	Central	5	(3)
2015	Paulista	13	(3)
2016	Sergipe	1	(0)
- * Club domestic league appearances and goals

Jaílson Alexandre Alves dos Santos (born 16 June 1981), or simply Jaílson, is a Brazilian former football attacking midfielder or striker.

== Career ==
Born in Caruaru, Jáilson spent his youth years at Porto de Caruaru. Afterwards he played for Santa Cruz, Sport, Vitória de Guimarães, among others. In 2006, he arrived at Paulista, and had his breakthrough season, scoring 17 goals in the 2006 Campeonato Brasileiro Série B. That performance attracted interest of Corinthians, who signed him in December 2006. However, despite a good start, which included a double against São Bento, in late February, Corinthians opted to loan him to Russian team Rubin Kazan until November.

Six months later, Jaílson was in Portugal, signing a four-year contract with Benfica and being immediately loaned to Braga. He was used as a back-up to Roland Linz, coming off the bench on all but three appearances, scoring four goals. After the season ended, his former manager at Braga, Manuel Machado, in transit to Nacional, requested that Benfica loaned him again. Nevertheless, in July 2008, Jaílson returned to Brazil to sign with Coritiba. He spent six months there, moving to Atlético Goianiense in 2009. His time in Goianiense was short and in July 2009, he returned to Portugal to play for Olhanense. Less than a month later, he was released because of physical problems. His next stop was Cyprus, playing for Ermis Aradippou for the remainder of the season.

Back to Portugal in 2010, Jaílson was an important player for Vitória de Setúbal in 2010–11, scoring four goals, the last two earned the club six points that helped them escape relegation. He did not renew his contract with Setúbal and was without team until January 2012, when he joined Boa. A month later, he terminated his contract with Boa. In March 2012, Jáilson joined Fortaleza, staying there until September 2013, scoring 23 goals.

After Fortaleza, he played three months at Icasa, before moving to Treze, where he played in 2014. Following a two-year spell at Central, Jáilson returned to Paulista in February 2015, staying there for eleven months, until signing with Sergipe.
