= Rio Bananal Futebol Clube =

Brazilian football club

Rio Bananal
- Full name: Rio Bananal Futebol Clube
- Founded: January 17, 2007
- Ground: Estádio Virgílio Grassi, Rio Bananal, Espírito Santo state, Brazil
- Capacity: 3,000
| Home colours | Away colours |

Rio Bananal Futebol Clube, commonly known as Rio Bananal, is a Brazilian football club based in Rio Bananal, Espírito Santo state.

== History ==
The club was founded on January 17, 2007. They finished in the second position in the Campeonato Capixaba Second Level in 2008, losing the competition to Serra.

== Stadium ==
Rio Bananal Futebol Clube play their home games at Estádio Virgílio Grassi. The stadium has a maximum capacity of 4,000 people.
