= Adriano Chuva =

Brazilian footballer (born 1979)

Personal information
- Full name: Adriano Neves Pereira
- Date of birth: 24 May 1979 (age 47)
- Place of birth: Capão da Canoa, Rio Grande do Sul, Brazil
- Height: 1.86 m (6 ft 1 in)
- Position: Forward

Youth career
- 1997–1998: Juventude

Senior career*
Years	Team	Apps	(Gls)
1998–1999	Juventude	7	(5)
1999–2000	Atlético Mineiro	1	(0)
2000–2001	Juventude	20	(5)
2001–2002	Cruzeiro	15	(3)
2002	Paraná	9	(9)
2003	Grêmio	31	(24)
2003–2004	Sport Receife	19	(4)
2004–2005	Palmeiras	5	(0)
2005	Sport	19	(1)
2005–2006	Al-Nassr	15	(10)
2006	Daejeon Citizen	24	(5)
2007	Náutico	18	(12)
2007	Fortaleza	11	(16)
2007	Daejeon Citizen	14	(8)
2008–2010	Chunnam Dragons	61	(25)
2011	Pohang Steelers	12	(4)
2012	Gwangju FC	3	(1)
2013	Avaí	0	(0)
2013	Atlético Sorocaba	3	(0)
2014	Esportivo	3	(0)
- * Club domestic league appearances and goals

Adriano Neves Pereira (born 24 May 1979), commonly known as Adriano Chuva, is a Brazilian former professional footballer who played primarily as a forward.

A tall, powerful forward, he was known for his pace, tactical awareness, speed, dribbling and accurate shooting.

Chuva is perhaps best described as a journeyman, namely because he has turned out for over twelve different clubs since he started his professional career with Juventude in 1997. However, despite his inability to settle, he has nevertheless proved himself to be a prolific goal-scorer wherever he has happened to play.

Born Adriano Neves Pereira, he was given his nickname, Chuva, at a young age by his mother Simone in deference to a family friend of the same name whom she thought Adriano resembled.

== Honours ==
Juventude

- Campeonato Gaúcho: 1998

Sport Recife

- Campeonato Pernambucano: 2003

Fortaleza

- Campeonato Cearense: 2007
