= Danilo Goiano =

Brazilian footballer (born 1983)

Personal information
- Full name: Danilo dos Santos Ribeiro
- Date of birth: 21 February 1983 (age 43)
- Place of birth: Goiânia, Brazil
- Height: 1.80 m (5 ft 11 in)
- Position: Central midfielder

Senior career*
| Years | Team | Apps | (Gls) |
| 2004–2005 | Sport Recife | 36 | (11) |
| 2005 | Ponte Preta | 19 | (2) |
| 2005–2006 | Levadiakos | 12 | (2) |
| 2006–2007 | Olympiacos Volos | 9 | (2) |
| 2008 | Porto Alegre | 21 | (9) |
| 2007–2008 | FK Zeta | 11 | (1) |
| 2009 | Marcílio Dias | 15 | (8) |
| 2009 | Atlético Sorocaba | 9 | (3) |
| 2010 | Trindade | 6 | (2) |
| 2010–2011 | Shahrdari Tabriz | 32 | (14) |
| 2011–2013 | Mes Rafsanjan | 44 | (20) |
| 2014 | River | 14 | (6) |
| 2015 | Goiânia | 10 | (6) |
| 2016 | Lajeadense | 9 | (3) |
- * Club domestic league appearances and goals

Danilo dos Santos Ribeiro, better known as Danilo Ribeiro or Danilo Goiano (born 21 February 1983) is a Brazilian former football midfielder.

== Career ==
Before moving to Europe, Danilo played in Sport Club Recife and Ponte Preta. In 2005, he moved to Greece where he played in Greek Super League club Levadiakos the first half of the season, and then in Olympiacos Volos the rest. In summer 2007 he returned to Brazil where he played, until next summer in Porto Alegre. In 2008, he returned to Europe this time to play in Montenegrin First League club FK Zeta. After one season there he returned to Brazil, first to play in Clube Náutico Marcílio Dias and then with Clube Atlético Sorocaba and Trindade Atlético Clube. In 2010, he moved to Iran to play with Shahrdari Tabriz And 2011 until 2013 in Mes Rafsanjan F.C. 2014 he play in Ríver Atlético Clube 2015 Goiânia Esporte Clube 2016 Clube Esportivo Lajeadense.
