= Valdir Papel =

Brazilian footballer

Personal information
- Full name: Waldirgly Bezerra Lima
- Date of birth: 12 August 1979 (age 47)
- Place of birth: Fortaleza, Brazil
- Height: 1.81 m (5 ft 11 in)
- Position: Forward

Senior career*
Years	Team	Apps	(Gls)
1999	Calouros do Ar		
2000	Americano-MA		
2000	Nacional-AM		
2001	Uniclinic		
2001–2002	Guarany de Sobral		
2002	Ceará		
2003–2004	Sport Recife		
2004	→ Guarani (loan)		
2005	Dorados de Sinaloa		
2006	Estudantes-PE		
2006	Vasco da Gama		
2006	Vitória		
2007	Madureira		
2007	Bragantino		
2008	ABC		
2008	Caxias		
2009	Bragantino		
2009	ASA da Amazônia		
2010	Guarany de Sobral		
2010	União Rondonópolis		
2010	Rio Branco-AC		
2011	São José-SP		
2011	Audax		
2012–2013	Luverdense		
2013	Santa Cruz-PA		
2014–2015	Juazeiro		
2015	Uniclinic		
2016	Sinop		
2017	Tiradentes-CE		
2017	União Rondonópolis		

Managerial career
- 2020: Pacajus (assistant)
- 2023: Maracanã
- * Club domestic league appearances and goals as of 13 October 2023

Waldirgly Bezerra Lima (born 12 August 1979), better known as Valdir Papel, is a Brazilian former professional footballer and manager who played as a forward.

== Career ==
Valdir started his career at Calouros do Ar, a small team from Fortaleza. He also played for Americano de Bacabal and Guarany de Sobral until he became champion for the first time, at Nacional FC do Amazonas in 2000. He managed to become state champion twice more, in 2002 with Ceará and 2003 with Sport Recife.

Valdir was marked during his time at Vasco da Gama, when he was sent off in the second leg of the 2006 Copa do Brasil final against CR Flamengo after pushing defender Leo Moura in the 16th minute. The player was also attacked in the locker room by coach Renato Portaluppi.

In 2007, at Madureira, he scored two goals against Botafogo FR in the Campeonato Carioca competition.

In football in Mato Grosso he managed to be state champion on two occasions, in 2010 with União Rondonópolis in 2012 with Luverdense EC, where he was also the top scorer in the competition.

== Managerial career ==
Papel began his career as a manager as an assistant at Pacajus EC in 2020. In the 2023 season, he was coach of Maracanã during the Campeonato Cearense.

== Honours ==
=== Club ===
Nacional-AM

- Campeonato Amazonense: 2000

Ceará

- Campeonato Cearense: 2002

Sport Recife

- Campeonato Pernambucano: 2003

Bragantino

- Campeonato Brasileiro Série C: 2007

ABC

- Campeonato Potiguar: 2008

União Rondonópolis

- Campeonato Matogrossense: 2010

Luverdense

- Campeonato Matogrossense: 2012

=== Individual ===
- 2012 Campeonato Matogrossense top scorer: 16 goals
