= Cléber (footballer, born March 1982) =

Brazilian footballer

Personal information
- Full name: Cléber Ferreira Manttuy
- Date of birth: 24 March 1982 (age 44)
- Height: 1.80 m (5 ft 11 in)
- Position: Defender

Team information
- Current team: Treze FC

Senior career*
Years	Team	Apps	(Gls)
2006–2007	Kallithea	11	(4)
2007	Marília		
2008–2009	Académica de Coimbra	9	(1)
- * Club domestic league appearances and goals as of 03:53, 30 November 2008 (UTC)

Cléber Ferreira Manttuy (born March 24, 1982), known as Cléber, is a Brazilian footballer who played for clubs including Académica de Coimbra.
