= Júnior Amorim =

Brazilian footballer (born 1972)

Personal information
- Full name: Misomar Rodrigues de Amorim Júnior
- Date of birth: 3 October 1972 (age 54)
- Place of birth: Belém, Brazil
- Height: 1.72 m (5 ft 8 in)
- Position: Forward

Team information
- Current team: Sampaio Corrêa (head coach)

Youth career
- Vasco da Gama

Senior career*
Years	Team	Apps	(Gls)
1992	Passo Fundo		
1993	Mouscron		
1993	Sampaio Corrêa		
1998	Sampaio Corrêa		
1999	Ceará		
1999	ABC		
2000	União São João	20	(6)
2000	Portuguesa	?	(0)
2001	Fortaleza		
2001	Sport Recife	?	(5)
2002	Santa Cruz		
2002	Náutico	?	(2)
2003	Sport Recife		
2003	Paysandu	?	(1)
2004–2005	Remo	?	(5)
2005–2006	Ypiranga-PE		
2006	CRB	?	(6)
2007	America-RJ		
2007–2008	CRB	?	(21)
2009	Madureira	0	(0)
2009	CSA		
2010	CRB	6	(1)
2011	Coruripe		
2012	Independente-PA		
2014	Murici	18	(3)
2014	Santa Rita		

Managerial career
- 2016–2017: Pinheirense
- 2018: Independente-PA
- 2018: Tuna Luso
- 2019: São Francisco-PA
- 2019–2020: Sampaio Corrêa (assistant)
- 2020: Sampaio Corrêa (interim)
- 2020: Sampaio Corrêa
- 2021: Moto Club
- 2021: Pedreira
- 2022: Tapajós
- 2022: Guarany de Sobral
- 2023: Bragantino-PA
- 2024: Cametá
- 2024: Izabelense
- 2025: Imperatriz
- 2025: Cordino
- 2025: Tocantinópolis
- 2026: Coruripe
- 2026: Atlético de Alagoinhas
- 2026–: Sampaio Corrêa
- * Club domestic league appearances and goals

Misomar Rodrigues de Amorim Júnior (born 3 October 1972), known as Júnior Amorim, is a Brazilian football coach and former player who played as a forward. He is the current head coach of Sampaio Corrêa.

== Playing career ==
Amorim was born in Belém, Pará, and finished his formation with Vasco da Gama. After making his senior debut with Passo Fundo in 1992, he moved abroad to join R.E. Mouscron in the following year before returning to Sampaio Corrêa.

Amorim's first title came up in 1999, as he won the Campeonato Potiguar with ABC. After representing União São João, Portuguesa, Fortaleza and Sport Recife, he was the top goalscorer of the 2002 Campeonato Pernambucano with Santa Cruz, scoring 12 goals.

Amorim then left for city rivals Náutico, but returned to Sport in 2003. After playing for hometown sides Paysandu and Remo, he joined CRB in 2006. He later returned to the latter club in 2007, after a brief stint at America-RJ, and was the club's top goalscorer in the league during his two-year spell; his second year, however, ended in relegation.

In March 2009, Amorim returned to Alagoas after signing for CSA from Madureira; highlights included a goal in a 1–0 victory over Neymar's Santos which knocked the team out of the 2009 Copa do Brasil. He returned to CRB for the 2010 season, but was released in September of that year due to the club's poor financial situation.

In 2011, Amorim represented Coruripe, and played for Independente-PA the following year. In January 2014, after two years without a club, he joined Murici. He later moved to Santa Rita, and retired in the end of the year at the age of 42.

== Managerial career ==
Amorim started his managerial career with Pinheirense in 2016, winning the second division of the Campeonato Paraense. On 5 December of the following year, he was named manager of his former club Independente for the ensuing campaign.

On 6 July 2018, Amorim took over Tuna Luso. In the following February, he was in charge of São Francisco-PA before being appointed João Brigatti's assistant at another of his former clubs, Sampaio Corrêa, in June.

On 20 February 2020, after Brigatti's departure to Ponte Preta, Amorim was appointed manager of Sampaio in an interim manner. He was definitely appointed manager on 3 March, after one match in charge, but was dismissed seven days later after another match.

== Honours ==
=== Player ===
Sampaio Corrêa

- Copa Norte: 1998
- Campeonato Maranhense: 1998

Ceará

- Campeonato Cearense: 1999

Fortaleza

- Campeonato Cearense: 2001

Sport Recife

- Campeonato Pernambucano: 2003

Remo

- Campeonato Paraense: 2004

==== Individual ====
- Campeonato Pernambucano top goalscorer: 2002 (12 goals)
- Campeonato Alagoano top goalscorer: 2008 (14 goals)

=== Manager ===
Pinheirense

- Campeonato Paraense Segunda Divisão: 2016
