= Ademar (footballer, born 1980) =

Brazilian footballer

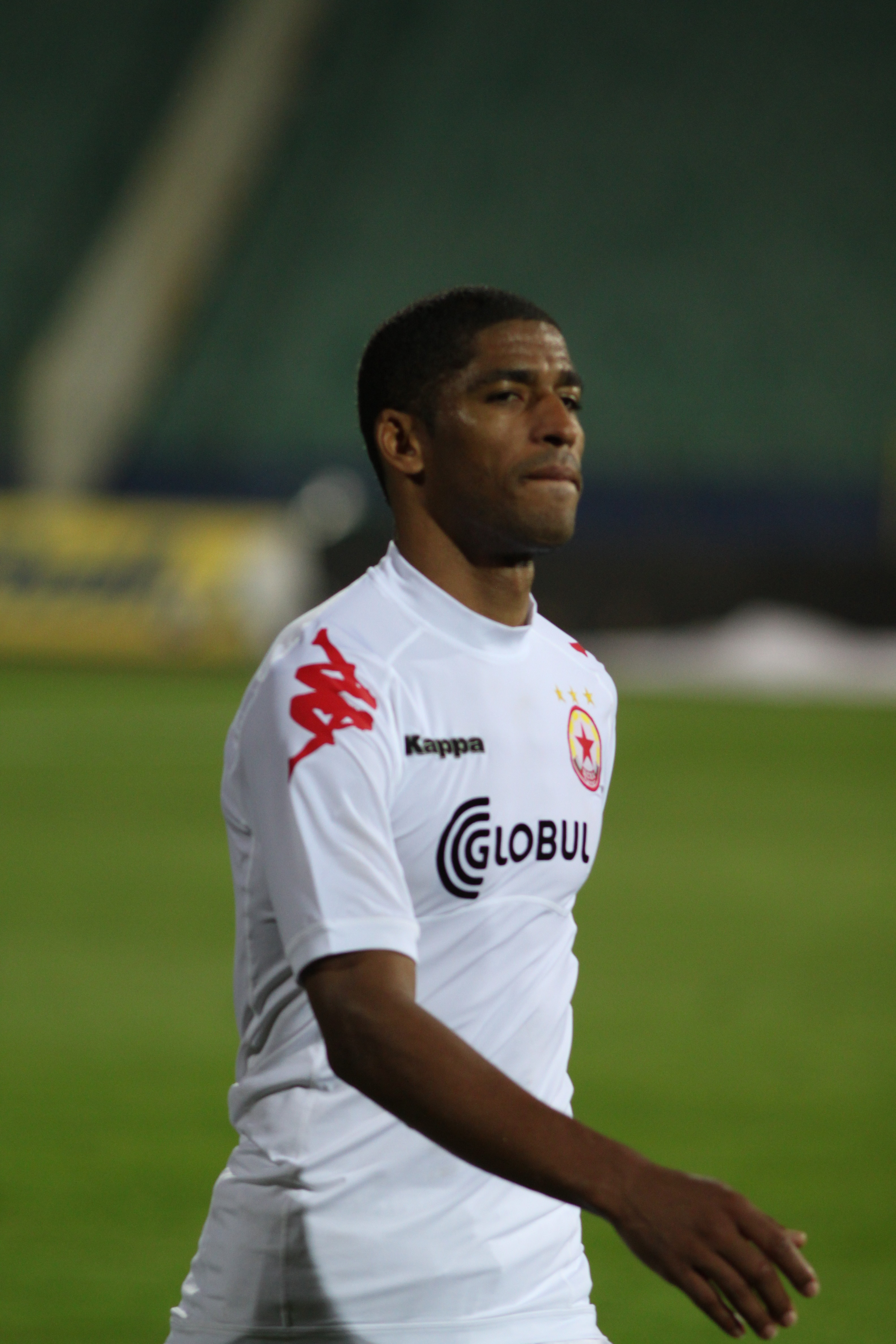

Personal information
- Full name: Ademar José Tavares Júnior
- Date of birth: 20 September 1980 (age 46)
- Place of birth: Jaboatão, Brazil
- Height: 1.78 m (5 ft 10 in)
- Position: Left wing back

Senior career*
Years	Team	Apps	(Gls)
2001–2004	Sport-PE	123	(30)
2005–2006	Náutico	33	(1)
2006	Guarani	22	(0)
2007	Brasiliense	20	(0)
2007	Ceará	14	(1)
2008	Gama	8	(0)
2009	Oeste	13	(1)
2009	ABC	2	(0)
2009–2011	Cherno More	34	(5)
2011–2012	CSKA Sofia	20	(0)
2013	Porto de Caruaru	8	(0)
Total		297	(38)
- * Club domestic league appearances and goals

Ademar José Tavares Júnior (born 20 September 1980 in Jaboatão), known as Ademar or Ademar Júnior, is a retired Brazilian football defender. Ademar plays on the left of defence or as a midfielder.

== Career ==
=== Cherno More ===
After spending the first nine years of his career in his home country with Sport Club do Recife, Náutico, Guarani, Brasiliense, Ceará, Oeste and ABC, Ademar relocated to Bulgaria in June, 2009, signing a two-year contract with Cherno More Varna. He took number 3 and made his team debut on July 7, in a friendly game against Levski Sofia. Ademar made his competitive debut a month later, in a Europa League match against PSV Eindhoven on August 6, 2009.

During his first season in Cherno More, Ademar played in various other positions for his club, mainly as a left midfielder. On March 1, 2010, Ademar scored his first goal for the team in a match against Chernomorets Burgas. He also scored twice for Cherno More in their 2–1 win away to Lokomotiv Sofia on April 25, 2010. On 17 October 2010, he was sent off in the 3:2 win against Slavia Sofia.

=== CSKA Sofia ===
On 1 June 2011, Milen Radukanov announced that Ademar had signed a contract with CSKA Sofia. The Brazilian made his official debut on 7 August 2011, in the 2:1 away win over Lokomotiv Sofia in an A PFG match. He sustained a waist injury in early April 2012, for which he underwent surgery at the “Acibadem” sports clinic in Istanbul and which saw him out of action until the end of the year. Eventually his contract with CSKA was cancelled after some financial disagreements with the club and he returned to Brazil, joining Porto de Caruaru.

== Club statistics ==
As of 30 May 2011

Club	Season	League		Cup		Europe		Total	
Club	Season	Apps	Goals	Apps	Goals	Apps	Goals	Apps	Goals
Cherno More	2009–10	13	5	2	0	1	0	16	5
Cherno More	2010–11	21	0	3	1	–	–	24	1
CSKA Sofia	2011–12	20	0	1	0	4	0	25	0
Career totals		54	5	6	1	5	0	65	6
