= Clayson Rato =

Brazilian footballer (born 1978)

Personal information
- Full name: Clayson Rubens Dantas Queiroz
- Date of birth: 15 October 1978 (age 48)
- Place of birth: Belém, Brazil
- Height: 1.67 m (5 ft 5 1/2 in)
- Position: Midfielder

Youth career
- Sport Belém

Senior career*
Years	Team	Apps	(Gls)
2002	Paysandu	13	(0)
2003	Sport	3	(0)
2004	Ananindeua		
2005	Abaeté	8	(3)
2006	Toronto Lynx	0	(0)
2006	Brampton Stallions	9	(3)
2007	Anapolis		
2008	Gama	13	(0)
2009	CSA	17	(5)
2010	Murici		
2015	Tocantinópolis		
- * Club domestic league appearances and goals

Clayson Rubens Dantas Queiroz (born 15 October 1978), known as Clayson Rato, is a Brazilian former footballer.

== Playing career ==
Clayson Rato began his football career with Paysandu Sport Club, the club he supported in his youth. He scored a goal as the club defeated Ponte Preta 4–3 during the 2002 Campeonato Brasileiro Série A.

Clayson had stints with clubs with Clube do Remo, Esporte Clube Rio Verde, and Abaete Futebol Clube. In 2006, he went abroad to Canada to sign with the Toronto Lynx of the USL First Division. His signing was announced in a press conference where the Lynx introduced two more signings from Brazil. Clayson failed to make an appearance during his short stint with Toronto, as he did not fit into Duncan Wilde's vision for the club and was subsequently deemed as surplus. In order to make room for new additional signings, Clayson's contract was bought out by the Brampton Stallions of the Canadian Soccer League.

Clayson made his debut for the Stallions in a match against London City, where he recorded his first goal of the season in a 6-0 thrashing over City at home. Clayson would further contribute to the Stallions by scoring another goal in 6–0 victory over the Caribbean Selects. He had a relatively successful tenure with Brampton, where he led that Stallions to five game undefeated streak and finished off the season with three goals and four assists. He helped the Brampton side clinch a playoff spot by finishing second in the National Division. After his stint in Canada came to a conclusion, Clayson returned to Brazil to have stints with Anápolis Futebol Clube, Gama, and returned to the Campeonato Brasileiro Série D to sign with CSA.
