= Edvaldo (footballer, born 1966) =

Brazilian footballer

Personal information
- Full name: Edvaldo Teles Alves
- Date of birth: 10 March 1966 (age 60)
- Position: Forward

Senior career*
| Years | Team | Apps | (Gls) |
| 1986–1988 | Vitória | 14 | (1) |
| 1989 | Porto | 2 | (0) |
| 1989–1990 | Olympiacos | 2 | (0) |
| 1990 | Freamunde | 8 | (0) |
| 1991 | Fluminense | | |
| 1996 | São José | | |
| Total | | 26 | (1) |
- * Club domestic league appearances and goals

Edvaldo Teles Alves (born 10 March 1966), commonly known as Edvaldo, is a retired Brazilian footballer. He died 29 March 2015.

== Career statistics ==
=== Club ===
As of 26 January 2019.

| Club | Season | League | | | Cup | | Other | | Total | |
| Club | Season | Division | Apps | Goals | Apps | Goals | Apps | Goals | Apps | Goals |
|---|---|---|---|---|---|---|---|---|---|---|
| Vitória | 1988 | Série A | 14 | 1 | 0 | 0 | 0 | 0 | 14 | 1 |
| Porto | 1988–89 | Primeira Divisão | 2 | 0 | 0 | 0 | 0 | 0 | 2 | 0 |
| Olympiacos | 1989–90 | Alpha Ethniki | 2 | 0 | 0 | 0 | 0 | 0 | 2 | 0 |
| Freamunde | 1990–91 | Segunda Divisão de Honra | 8 | 0 | 0 | 0 | 0 | 0 | 8 | 0 |
| Career total | | | 26 | 1 | 0 | 0 | 0 | 0 | 26 | 1 |
