= Rodrigo Broa =

Brazilian footballer

Personal information
- Full name: Rodrigo Silva dos Santos
- Date of birth: April 13, 1981 (age 45)
- Place of birth: Imperatriz, Brazil
- Height: 1.72 m (5 ft 8 in)
- Positions: Second striker; attacking midfielder

Youth career
- 2000–2001: Remo

Senior career*
Years	Team	Apps	(Gls)
2002–2004	Remo	16	(1)
2005–2006	Paysandu	32	(6)
2006–2010	Flamengo	?	(?)
2006	→ Sport (loan)	?	(?)
2007	→ Fortaleza (loan)	?	(?)
2008	→ Caxias (loan)	?	(?)
2009	→ Campinense (loan)	16	(1)
2010	→ Águia de Marabá (loan)	1	(0)
2011–2021	Tuna Luso		
- * Club domestic league appearances and goals

Rodrigo Silva dos Santos or simply Rodrigo Broa (born April 13, 1981), is a Brazilian former attacking midfielder. He played in the Campeonato Brasileiro Série A for Paysandu.

== Career ==
Although Rodrigo Broa started his career at Remo, he then played at Pará rivals Paysandu. His best performances for Paysandu happened during the 2005 Campeonato Brasileiro Série A when he formed a midfield featured alongside Marabá and the duo caught the attention of big Brazilian clubs, particularly Flamengo.

In 2006, Rodrigo Broa and Marabá joined Flamengo. Rodrigo signed a four-year deal and, unlike Marabá, got to play in a competitive match. He had a few opportunities with the team but failed to impress the coaching staff, eventually losing his spot to other players.

Later in 2006, Rodrigo Broa was loaned to Sport Club do Recife of the Campeonato Brasileiro Série B. Although Recife wanted to make his transfer permanent at the end of the loan period, he went back to Flamengo and, without playing, went to Fortaleza, again on loan.

Fulfilled without much success, his contract with Fortaleza until the end of the 2007 season when once again he was loaned, this time to Caxias, in 2008.

In 2009, he returned to Flamengo and lived in expectation of being noticed by the coach Cuca, which did not happen. Rejected by the football department, Rodrigo began to train separately and received a loan proposal from Campinense, who had risen to the Campeonato Brasileiro Série B. At the end of the season, Campinense were relegated to the Campeonato Brasileiro Série C.

For the 2010 season, the year he would end his contract with Flamengo, Broa left Campinense and signed on loan with Águia de Marabá.

=== Career statistics ===
(Correct as of September 11, 2010)

Club	Season	State League		Brazilian Série A		Copa do Brasil		Copa Libertadores		Copa Sudamericana		Total	
Club	Season	Apps	Goals	Apps	Goals	Apps	Goals	Apps	Goals	Apps	Goals	Apps	Goals
Flamengo	2006	-	-	?	?	?	?	-	-	-	-	?	?
Total		-	-	?	?	?	?	-	-	-	-	?	?

== Honours ==
- Paysandu
  - Campeonato Paraense: 2005
- Flamengo
  - Copa do Brasil: 2006
- Fortaleza
  - Campeonato Cearense: 2007
