= Nildo (footballer, born 1975) =

Brazilian footballer

Personal information
- Full name: Josenildo Caetano da Silva
- Date of birth: 20 October 1975 (age 51)
- Place of birth: Caruaru, Brazil
- Height: 1.68 m (5 ft 6 in)
- Positions: Attacking midfielder; forward

Youth career
- –1995: Porto-PE

Senior career*
Years	Team	Apps	(Gls)
1995–1997	Porto-PE		
1997–1998	Fluminense	49	(4)
1998–2004	Sport Recife		
2004	São Paulo	12	(2)
2005	Figueirense		
2006	Náutico		
2007	ABC		
2007–2008	Santa Cruz		
- * Club domestic league appearances and goals as of 13 October 2023

Josenildo Caetano da Silva (born 20 October 1975), simply known as Nildo, is a Brazilian former professional footballer who played as an attacking midfielder and forward.

== Career ==
Revealed at CA do Porto de Caruaru, Nildo became one of the greatest players in the history of Sport Recife, where he played from 1998 to 2004 and participated in winning several titles. He played for all the main clubs in Pernambuco, Fluminense and São Paulo. He was also part of the ABC Potiguar champion squad in 2007.

== Honours ==
Sport Recife

- Copa do Nordeste: 2000
- Campeonato Pernambucano: 1998, 1999, 2000, 2003

ABC

- Campeonato Potiguar: 2007

Individual

- 2000 Copa dos Campeões top scorer: 3 goals
