= 1º de Maio Esporte Clube =

Brazilian football club

1º de Maio
- Full name: 1º de Maio Esporte Clube
- Nicknames: Azulino de Atrás da Banca; Ararinha do Sertão
- Founded: February 23, 1985 (40 years ago)
- Ground: Estádio Associação Rural, Petrolina, Pernambuco state, Brazil
- Capacity: 5,000
| Home colors | Away colors |

1º de Maio Esporte Clube, commonly known as 1º de Maio, is a Brazilian football club based in Petrolina, Pernambuco state. They competed in the Série C once.

== History ==
The club was founded on February 23, 1985. 1º de Maio finished in the second position in the Campeonato Pernambucano Second Level in 1996, when they lost the competition to Flamengo de Arcoverde, and in 2002, when they lost the competition to Itacuruba.

== Stadium ==
1º de Maio Esporte Clube play their home games at Estádio Paulo de Souza Coelho, nicknamed Estádio Associação Rural. The stadium has a maximum capacity of 5,000 people.
