= Ferroviário Esporte Clube (Serra Talhada) =

Association football club in Serra Talhada, Pernambuco, Brazil

Ferroviário-ST
- Full name: Ferroviário Esporte Clube
- Nickname(s): Ferrim; Alviverde
- Founded: September 15, 1979
- Ground: Pereirão, Serra Talhada, Pernambuco state, Brazil
- Capacity: 5,000
Home colours	Away colours

Ferroviário Esporte Clube, commonly known as Ferroviário-ST, is a Brazilian football club based in Serra Talhada, Pernambuco state. They competed in the Série C once.

== History ==
The club was founded on September 15, 1979. Ferroviário-ST won the Campeonato Pernambucano Second Level in 1997.

== Stadium ==
Ferroviário Esporte Clube play their home games at Estádio Nildo Pereira de Menezes, nicknamed Pereirão. The stadium has a maximum capacity of 5,000 people.

== Achievements ==
- Campeonato Pernambucano Second Level:
  - Winners (1): 1997
