= Itacuruba Sport Club =

Brazilian football club

Itacuruba
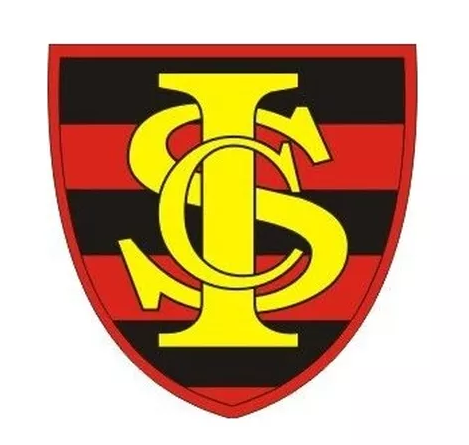
- Full name: Itacuruba Sport Club
- Nickname(s): Papão; Bicho-Papão; Alvenegro
- Founded: August 2, 1987
- Ground: Galdenção, Itacuruba, Pernambuco state, Brazil
- Capacity: 5,000
Home colours	Away colours

Itacuruba Sport Club, commonly known as Itacuruba, is a Brazilian football club based in Itacuruba, Pernambuco state. They competed in the Série C once.

== History ==
The club was founded on August 2, 1987. They won the Campeonato Pernambucano Third Level in 2001, and the Campeonato Pernambucano Second Level in 2002. Itacuruba competed in the Série C in 2005.

== Honours ==
- Campeonato Pernambucano Série A2
  - Winners (1): 2002
- Campeonato Pernambucano Série A3
  - Winners (1): 2001

== Stadium ==
Itacuruba Sport Club play their home games at Estádio Antônio Galdêncio Freire, nicknamed Galdenção. The stadium has a maximum capacity of 5,000 people.
