= Estudantes Sport Club =

Estudantes
- Full name: Estudantes Sport Club
- Nickname(s): Carneirão
- Founded: May 1, 1958
- Ground: Estádio Ferreira Lima, Timbaúba, Brazil
- Capacity: 5,000
- President: Genei Francisco Gomes da Silva
Home colours	Away colours

Estudantes Sport Club, also known as Estudantes, are a Brazilian football team from Timbaúba, Pernambuco. They competed in the Série B in 1991, and in the Série C in 1990.

== History ==
Estudantes Sport Club were founded on May 1, 1958. The club competed in the Série C in 1990, when they were eliminated in the first stage. They competed in the Série B in 1991, when they were eliminated in the first stage of the competition. Estudantes won the Campeonato Pernambucano Second Level in 2005.

== Stadium ==
Estudantes play their home games at Estádio Ferreira Lima. The stadium has a maximum capacity of 5,000 people.

== Achievements ==
- Campeonato Pernambucano Second Level:
  - Winners (1): 2005
