= Balão (footballer, born 1975) =

Brazilian footballer

Personal information
- Full name: Sandro Júnior Cavalcante da Costa
- Date of birth: 8 May 1975 (age 51)
- Place of birth: Castanhal, Brazil
- Height: 1.69 m (5 ft 7 in)
- Position: Forward

Youth career
- –1995: Remo

Senior career*
Years	Team	Apps	(Gls)
1995–2000	Remo		
2001	Sport Recife		
2002	Remo		
2002–2003	Paysandu		
2003	Ulsan Hyundai		
2004–2007	Paysandu		
2007	Ituano		
2008	CRAC		
2008–2009	Paysandu		
2010–2011	Cametá		
- * Club domestic league appearances and goals as of 20 October 2023

Sandro Júnior Cavalcante da Costa (born 8 May 1975), better known as Balão, is a Brazilian former professional footballer who played as a forward.

== Career ==
Balão started his career playing indoor football for Remo. He was transferred to field football and did not disappoint, participating in four state titles in the 90s. Moved to the rival, Paysandu, and was once again successful there, participating in the club's victories in the Copa Norte, Copa dos Champions and again four more state titles.

== Honours ==
Remo

- Campeonato Paraense: 1995, 1996, 1997, 1999

Paysandu

- Copa dos Campeões: 2002
- Copa Norte: 2002
- Campeonato Paraense: 2002, 2005, 2006, 2009

Individual

- 2006 Campeonato Paraense top scorer: 10 goals
