= Edivaldo (footballer, born 1974) =

Brazilian footballer

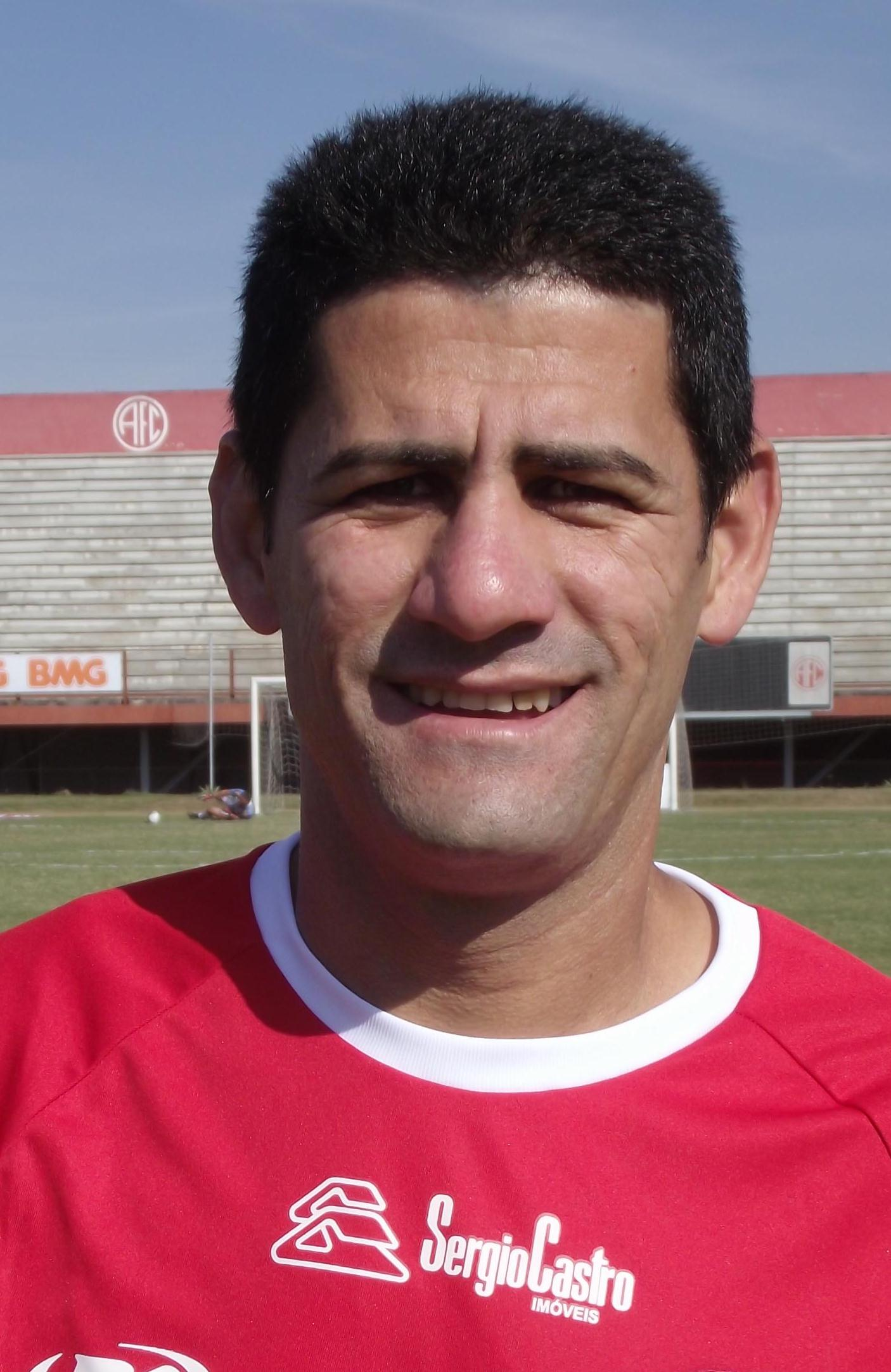
- Edivaldo Medeiros in 2011.

Personal information
- Full name: Edivaldo Medeiros da Silva
- Date of birth: March 23, 1974 (age 52)
- Place of birth: Duque de Caxias, Brazil
- Height: 1.85 m (6 ft 1 in)
- Position: Striker

Team information
- Current team: América-RJ

Senior career*
Years	Team	Apps	(Gls)
2003–2004	Botafogo		
2005	América-RJ		
2006	Botafogo-PB		
2007–2008	Duque de Caxias		
2008	Cabofriense		
2009	Duque de Caxias	32	(19)
2010	Itumbiara	3	(1)
2010	CRB		
2010	Macaé		
2011	Madureira		
2011–	América-RJ		
- * Club domestic league appearances and goals as of November 23, 2009

Edivaldo Medeiros da Silva, called Edivaldo (born March 23, 1974), is a Brazilian football player, currently playing in América-RJ. Edivaldo was born in Duque de Caxias, Rio de Janeiro.

Edivaldo is a striker and is the topscorer of his club on 2009 Campeonato Brasileiro Série B with 15 goals.

He previously played for América-RJ and Botafogo in the Copa do Brasil.
