= Petrolina Social Futebol Clube =

Brazilian football club

Petrolina
- Full name: Petrolina Social Futebol Clube
- Nicknames: Fera Sertaneja; Tigre
- Founded: 11 November 1998; 27 years ago
- Ground: Paulo de Souza Coelho
- Capacity: 5,000
- League: Campeonato Pernambucano Série A2
- 2025: Pernambucano, 10th of 10 (relegated)
Home colours	Away colours

Petrolina Social Futebol Clube, also known simply as Petrolina, is a Brazilian football club founded in 1998 in Petrolina, Pernambuco. The first appearance in the Série A1 (top level of Pernambuco Football) was in 2002. The biggest competitor of Petrolina is the 1º de Maio Esporte Clube, also a club of Petrolina.

== History ==
Logo used until 2016

The club was founded on 11 November 1998. They started to feature in a senior competition in the following year, playing in the Campeonato Pernambucano Série A2, and achieved promotion to the Campeonato Pernambucano in 2001, as champions.

Petrolina qualified to the 2008 Série C after Ypiranga withdrew from the competition, but were knocked out in the first phase.

== Honours ==
- Campeonato Pernambucano Série A2
  - Champions (1): 2001
