= Sociedade Esportiva Ypiranga Futebol Clube =

Ypiranga
- Full name: Sociedade Esportiva Ypiranga Futebol Clube
- Nickname(s): Azulino; Máquina do Interior; Alvizulina
- Founded: July 3, 1938
- Ground: Limeirão, Santa Cruz do Capibaribe, Pernambuco state, Brazil
- Capacity: 5,000
Home colours	Away colours

Sociedade Esportiva Ypiranga Futebol Clube, commonly known as Ypiranga, is a Brazilian football club based in Santa Cruz do Capibaribe, Pernambuco state. They competed twice in the Série C.

== History ==
The club was founded on August 3, 1938. They competed in the Série C in 1995, when they were eliminated in the First Stage of the competition. Ypiranga won the Campeonato Pernambucano Second Level in 2004. The club competed again in the Série C in 2006, being eliminated again in the First Stage of the competition.

== Achievements ==
- Copa Pernambuco:
  - Winners (1): 1994
- Campeonato Pernambucano Série A2:
  - Winners (1): 2004

== Stadium ==
Sociedade Esportiva Ypiranga Futebol Clube play their home games at Estádio Otávio Limeira Alves, nicknamed Limeirão. The stadium has a maximum capacity of 5,000 people.
