= Ricardinho (footballer, born 1978) =

Brazilian footballer

Personal information
- Full name: Cicero Ricardo De Souza
- Date of birth: 3 October 1978 (age 48)
- Place of birth: Serra Talhada, Brazil
- Height: 1.74 m (5 ft 9 in)
- Position: Forward

Senior career*
Years	Team	Apps	(Gls)
1998–2000	Serrano	35	(19)
2000–2004	Sport Recife	163	(75)
2004	Paços de Ferreira	45	(12)
2004–2005	Botafogo	61	(8)
2006	Vasco da Gama	14	(5)
2007–2008	Paços de Ferreira	55	(6)
2008	Marília	10	(6)
2009–2010	Brasiliense	70	(18)
2010–2011	Rah Ahan	28	(5)
2011	Salgueiro	19	(6)
2012–2014	Sampaio Corrêa	43	(7)
2014–2015	Serra Talhada	15	(6)
- * Club domestic league appearances and goals

Cicero Ricardo de Souza (born 3 October 1978) is a Brazilian former footballer, also known as Ricardinho.

== Career ==
He began his career with Brazilian team Sport Recife of Campeonato Brasileiro Série A and in 2004 after seven years the club he was bought by Portuguese team Paços de Ferreira but only could manage 12 games with no goals and then was transferred back to Brazil to popular Brazilian team Botafogo and was there for two years and after good performances was bought buy Brazilian giants Vasco da Gama and after one year was bought again by Paços de Ferreira for the second time in 2006. Since 2006 when arriving to Paços de Ferreira he has only managed to play 18 games in a year and a half.

=== Career statistics ===
Last update: 13 December 2010

Club performance			League		Cup		Continental		Total	
Season	Club	League	Apps	Goals	Apps	Goals	Apps	Goals	Apps	Goals
Iran			League		Hazfi Cup		Asia		Total	
2010–11	Rah Ahan	Persian Gulf Cup								
Total	Iran		0	0	0	0	0	0	0	0
Career total			0	0	0	0	0	0	0	0

- Assist Goals

Season	Team	Assists
10/11	Rah Ahan	0
