= Clube Atlético do Porto =

Association football club in Brazil

Porto de Caruaru
- Full name: Clube Atlético do Porto
- Nicknames: Tricolor do Agreste (Agreste's Tricolor); Gavião do Agreste (Agreste's Hawk)
- Founded: July 30, 1993
- Ground: Antônio Inácio de Souza, Caruaru, PE, Brazil
- Capacity: 6,000
- League: Campeonato Pernambucano Série A2
- 2025: Pernambucano Série A2, 6th of 10
Home colors	Away colors

Clube Atlético do Porto, usually known simply as Porto (or Porto de Caruaru or Porto-PE), is a Brazilian football team from the city of Caruaru, Pernambuco state, founded on July 23, 1983.

Porto's rival is Central, which is another Caruaru football club.

== History ==
On July 23, 1983, the club was founded by Rua Coronel Francisco Rodrigues Porto (Coronel Francisco Rodrigues Porto Street) residents.

In January 1994, the club joined the Pernambuco Football Federation, and in the same year, Porto competed in the Campeonato Brasileiro Série C for the first time, but was eliminated in the first stage.

In 1995, again the club was eliminated in the Campeonato Brasileiro Série C first stage. In 1996, Porto reached the Campeonato Brasileiro Série C semifinals, but the club was defeated by Vila Nova. In 1997, the club competed in the Campeonato Brasileiro Série C again, but was eliminated by Ferroviário in the second stage. In 1999, the club competed in the Copa do Brasil and in the Campeonato do Nordeste. In both competitions the club was eliminated in the first stage.

In 2000, Porto competed in the Copa João Havelange's Green Module, which was the season's equivalent to the Campeoanato Brasileiro's third level, and was eliminated in the first level. In 2003, Porto won the Campeonato Pernambucano Second Level, beating Serrano, Centro Limoeirense and Barreiros in the final four group stage. In 2004, the club competed again in the Campeonato Brasileiro Série C, but was eliminated in the third stage by Treze. In 2006, Porto was eliminated in the Campeonato Brasileiro Série C's second stage. In 2007, the club competed again in the Campeonato Brasileiro Série C, and again was eliminated in the second stage.

== Stadium ==
Porto's home stadium is Antônio Inácio de Souza Stadium, with a maximum capacity of 6,000 people.

The club also owns a training ground, named CT Ninho do Gavião, meaning Hawk's Nest.

== Honours ==
=== Official tournaments ===
State
Competitions	Titles	Seasons
Copa Pernambuco	1	1999
Campeonato Pernambucano Série A2	1	2003

=== Others tournaments ===
==== City ====
- Liga Desportiva Caruaruense (2): 1993, 1994

=== Runners-up ===
- Campeonato Pernambucano (2): 1997, 1998
- Copa Pernambuco (2): 2010, 2012
