= Centro Limoeirense de Futebol =

Brazilian football club

Centro Limoeirense
- Full name: Centro Limoeirense de Futebol
- Nickname(s): O Mais Querido; Dragão Limoeirense
- Founded: September 15, 1913
- Ground: José Vareda, Limoeiro
- Capacity: 5,000
- Chairman: Adelmo Soares
- League: Campeonato Pernambucano Série A2
- 2021: 11th of 14
Home colours	Away colours

Centro Limoeirense de Futebol is a Brazilian football soccer club, founded in 1913, on Limoeiro city (Pernambuco State). The club became professional in 1963 to be eligible to compete in the Campeonato Pernambucano. Centro Limoeirense competed in the Campeonato Brasileiro Série C in 1997.

== Current squad (some players) ==
Note: Flags indicate national team as defined under FIFA eligibility rules; some limited exceptions apply. Players may hold more than one non-FIFA nationality.

No.	Pos.	Nation	Player
—	DF	(Brazil) BRA	Márcio ()

== Appearances in competitions ==
- Campeonato Pernambucano: 1963, 1964, 1996, 1997, 2001, 2008
- Campeonato Brasileiro Série C: 1997
