= Itacuruba =

Municipality of Pernambuco, Brazil

- Municipality of Pernambuco, Brazil
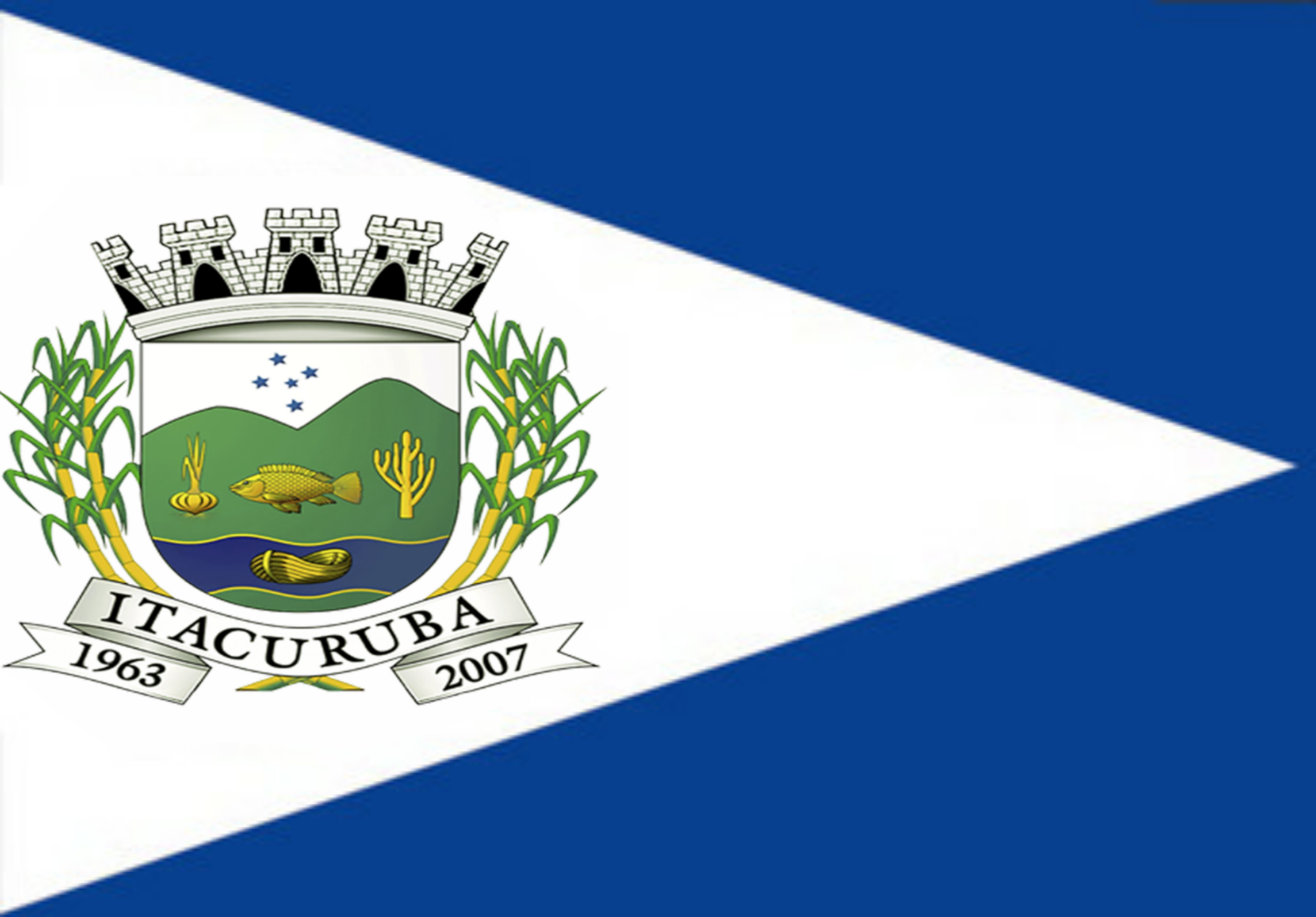
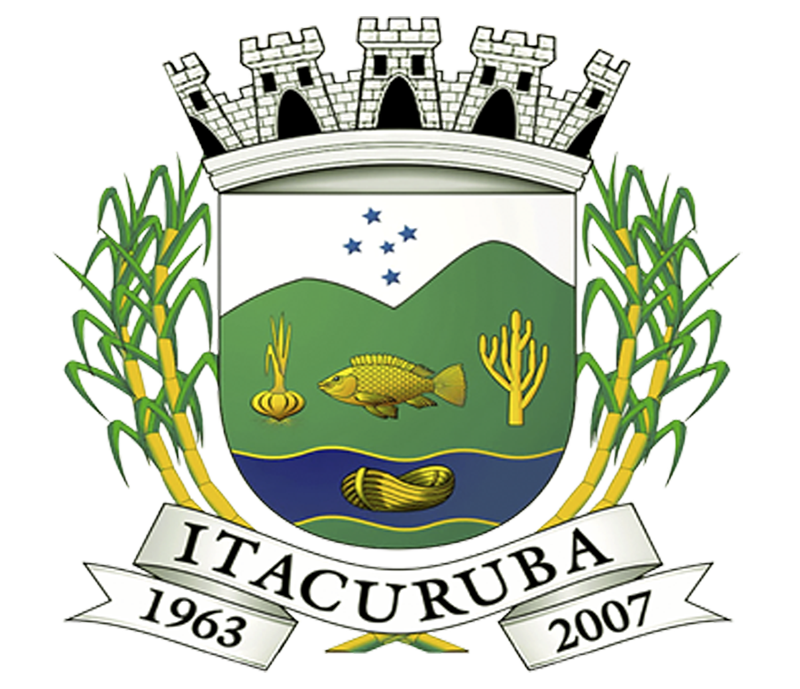
- Flag Coat of arms
- Etymology: Derived from the Tupi-Guarani language, meaning crusty or holey stone
- Location of Itacuruba in Pernambuco

- Location within Brazil Location within South America
- Coordinates: 8°43′40″S 38°41′20″W
- Country: Brazil
- Region: Northeast
- State: Pernambuco
- Founded: 20 December 1963

Government
  - Mayor: Olegario Junior Cantarelli (PSB) (2025-2028)
  - Vice Mayor: Claudia Cavalcanti de Melo (PSB) (2025-2028)

Area
  - Total: 436.528 km^{2} (168.544 sq mi)
- Elevation: 292 m (958 ft)

Population (2022 Census)
  - Total: 4,284
  - Estimate (2025): 4,491
  - Density: 9.96/km^{2} (25.8/sq mi)
- Demonym: Itacurubense (Brazilian Portuguese)
- Time zone: UTC-03:00 (Brasília Time)
- Postal code: 56430-000
- HDI (2010): 0.595 – medium
- Website: itacuruba.pe.gov.br

Itacuruba (Central northeastern portuguese pronunciation: [itɐkuˈɾubɐ]) is a city in the state of Pernambuco, Brazil. The population in 2025, according with IBGE is 4,91 inhabitants and the total area is 436,528 km^{2}.

== Geography ==
- State - Pernambuco
- Region - São Francisco Pernambucano
- Boundaries - Belém de São Francisco (N and W); Bahia state (S); Floresta (E).
- Area - 430.01 km^{2}
- Elevation - 600 m
- Hydrography - Pajeú da caixa prego
- Vegetation - Caatinga hiperxerófila.
- Climate - Semi arid ( Sertão) hot
- Annual average temperature - 26.1 °C
- Distance to Recife - 900.8 km

== Economy ==
The main economic activities in Itacuruba are based in agribusiness, especially creation of sheep, goats, cattle, chickens; and plantations of onions and tomatoes.

=== Economic Indicators ===
Population	GDP x(1000 R$).	GDP pc (R$)	PE
60.875	19.376	4.729	0.033%

Economy by Sector 2006

Primary sector	Secondary sector	Service sector
18.74%	9.06%	72.20%

=== Health Indicators ===
HDI (2000)	Hospitals (2007)	Hospitals beds (2007)	Children's Mortality every 1000 (2005)
0.684	1	8	20.2

== See also ==
- List of municipalities in Pernambuco
