= Campeonato Pernambucano Série A3 =

Football tournament in Brazil

- Organising body: FPF
- Founded: 1996; 30 years ago
- Country: Brazil
- State: Pernambuco
- Level on pyramid: 3
- Promotion to: Série A2
- Current champions: América (1st title) (2024)
- Most championships: Ramalat (4 titles)
- Website: FPF Official website

The Campeonato Pernambucano - Série A3 is the third tier of the professional state football league in the Brazilian state of Pernambucano. It is run by the Pernambuco Football Federation (FPF).

== List of Champions ==
Season	Champions	Runners-up
Copa Intermunicipal
1996	Ramalat (1)	
1997	Ramalat (2)	
1998	Ramalat (3)	
1999	Ramalat (4)	Ferroviário do Cabo
Terceira Divisão
2000	Ferroviário do Cabo (1)	Pesqueira
2001	Itacuruba (1)	
2002	Vera Cruz (1)	Vila Rica
Série A3
2023	Ypiranga (1)	Ipojuca
2024	América (1)	Águia de Cumaru

== Titles by team ==
Teams in bold still active.

Rank	Club	Winners	Winning years
1	Ramalat	4	1996, 1997, 1998, 1999
2	**Ferroviário do Cabo**	1	2000
2	Itacuruba	1	2001
2	**Vera Cruz**	1	2002
2	**Ypiranga**	1	2023
2	**América**	1	2024

=== By city ===
City	Championships	Clubs
Ouricuri	4	Ramalat (4)
Cabo de Santo Agostinho	1	Ferroviário do Cabo (1)
Itacuruba	1	Itacuruba (1)
Recife	1	América (1)
Santa Cruz do Capibaribe	1	Ypiranga (1)
Vitória de Santo Antão	1	Vera Cruz (1)

== See also ==
- Campeonato Pernambucano
- Campeonato Pernambucano Série A2
