= 2019 Clube Náutico Capibaribe season =

Náutico
2019 season
- Chairman: Edno Melo
- Manager: Márcio Goiano; Gilmar Dal Pozzo
- Stadium: Estádio dos Aflitos
- Série C: Champions (1st title)
- Pernambucano: Runners-up
- Copa do Nordeste: Semi-final
- Copa do Brasil: Second round
- Top goalscorer: League: Álvaro Oliveira (6); All: Wallace Pernambucano (11)
Home colours	Away colours	Third colours

The 2019 season was Náutico's 119th season in the club's history. Náutico competed in the Campeonato Pernambucano, Copa do Nordeste, Copa do Brasil and Série C.

== Final squad ==
Note: Flags indicate national team as defined under FIFA eligibility rules; some limited exceptions apply. Players may hold more than one non-FIFA nationality.

No.	Pos.	Nation	Player
1	GK	BRA	Bruno
12	GK	BRA	Luiz Carlos
—	GK	BRA	Sergio
26	DF	BRA	Sueliton
4	DF	BRA	Camutanga
13	DF	BRA	Rafael Ribeiro
—	DF	BRA	Richard
2	DF	BRA	Diogo Hereda
15	DF	BRA	André Krobel
6	DF	BRA	Assis
—	DF	BRA	Gabriel
5	MF	BRA	Josa
17	MF	PAR	Roa Jiménez

No.	Pos.	Nation	Player
8	MF	BRA	Luiz Henrique
18	MF	BRA	Maylson
—	MF	BRA	Willian Gaúcho
10	MF	BRA	Fábio Matos
28	MF	ARG	Nahuel Cisneros
9	FW	BRA	Wallace Pernambucano
37	FW	BRA	Tharcysio
11	FW	BRA	Odilávio
23	FW	BRA	Jorge Henrique
29	FW	BRA	Rafael Nascimento
7	FW	BRA	Robinho
16	FW	BRA	Matheus Carvalho

== Statistics ==
=== Overall ===
Games played	49 (10 Copa do Nordeste, 13 Pernambucano, 2 Copa do Brasil, 24 Série C)
Games won	26 (5 Copa do Nordeste, 9 Pernambucano, 0 Copa do Brasil, 12 Série C)
Games drawn	12 (3 Copa do Nordeste, 1 Pernambucano, 2 Copa do Brasil, 6 Série C)
Games lost	11 (2 Copa do Nordeste, 3 Pernambucano, 0 Copa do Brasil, 6 Série C)
Goals scored	77
Goals conceded	49
Goal difference	+28
Best results (goal difference)	5–0 (H) v Petrolina - Pernambucano - 2019.01.30
Worst result (goal difference)	1–3 (H) v Fortaleza - Copa do Nordeste - 2019.01.15; 1–3 (A) v Sport - Campeonato Pernambucano - 2019.01.27
Top scorer	Wallace Pernambucano (11)

Source: Náutico official website

=== Goalscorers ===
Place	Position	Nation	Number	Name	Copa do Nordeste	Campeonato Pernambucano	Copa do Brasil	Série C	Total
1	MF	(Brazil)	9	Wallace Pernambucano	4	4	0	3	11
2	MF	(Brazil)	11	Thiago Fernandes	1	2	0	5	8
3	FW	(Brazil)	7	Álvaro Oliveira	0	0	0	6	6
4	FW	(Brazil)	16	Matheus Carvalho	0	1	0	4	5
5	MF	(Paraguay)	17	Jorge Jimenez	1	1	0	2	4
5	MF	(Brazil)	8	Luiz Henrique	0	3	0	1	4
6	DF	(Brazil)	15	André Krobel	0	1	1	1	3
6	DF	(Brazil)	6	Assis	0	2	0	1	3
6	DF	(Brazil)	3	Diego Silva	0	2	0	1	3
6	FW	(Brazil)	11	Odilávio	2	1	0	0	3
6	FW	(Brazil)	7	Robinho	1	2	0	0	3
7	DF	(Brazil)	2	Hereda	1	1	0	0	2
7	MF	(Brazil)	10	Jean Carlos	0	0	0	2	2
7	MF	(Brazil)	8	Jhonnatan	0	0	0	2	2
7	MF	(Brazil)	23	Jorge Henrique	1	0	1	0	2
7	MF	(Brazil)	5	Josa	0	1	0	1	2
7	MF	(Brazil)	18	Maylson	2	0	0	0	2
7	FW	(Brazil)	29	Rafael Nascimento	0	0	0	2	2
8	DF	(Brazil)	4	Camutanga	0	0	0	1	1
8	MF	(Brazil)	11	Fábio Matos	0	1	0	0	1
8	DF	(Brazil)	14	Fernando	0	0	0	1	1
8	DF	(Brazil)	13	Rafael Ribeiro	0	1	0	0	1
8	DF	(Brazil)	26	Suéliton	0	1	0	0	1
				Own goals	3	1	0	1	5
				Total	16	25	2	34	77

== Official Competitions ==
=== Copa do Nordeste ===
==== Group stage ====
15 January 2019 1	Náutico	1–3	Fortaleza	Recife
22:30 (UTC-3)	Wallace Pernambucano 85'	Report	Júnior Santos 1', 74'; Éderson 80'	Stadium: Estádio Eládio de Barros Carvalho (Aflitos); Attendance: 10,678; Referee: Ricarle Gustavo Gonçalves Batista

22 January 2019 2	Sergipe	0–2	Náutico	Aracaju
22:30 (UTC-3)		Report	Wallace Pernambucano 27'; Maylson 50'	Stadium: Estádio Lourival Baptista (Batistão); Attendance: 2,006; Referee: Clizaldo Luiz Maroja Di Pace França

2 February 2019 3	Salgueiro	1–1	Náutico	Salgueiro
17:00 (UTC-3)	Muller 62'	Report	Wallace Pernambucano 80'	Stadium: Estádio Cornélio de Barros; Attendance: 1,120; Referee: Luiz César de Oliveira Magalhães

9 February 2019 4	Náutico	2–2	Santa Cruz	Recife
19:30 (UTC-3)	Jorge Henrique 27'; Vitão 68' (o.g.)	Report	Pipico 7', 50'	Stadium: Estádio Eládio de Barros Carvalho (Aflitos); Attendance: 6,017; Referee: Marielson Alves Silva

7 March 2019 5	Náutico	2–1	Sampaio Corrêa	Recife
19:00 (UTC-3)	Hereda 29'; Robinho 48'	Report	Maxuell Samurai 19'	Stadium: Estádio Eládio de Barros Carvalho (Aflitos); Attendance: 3,954; Referee: Cláudio Francisco Lima e Silva

14 March 2019 6	CRB	1–2	Náutico	Maceió
21:30 (UTC-3)	Felipe Menezes 62'	Report	Odilávio 6'; Jimenez 46'	Stadium: Estádio Rei Pelé; Attendance: 4,378; Referee: Pablo Ramon Gonçalves Pinheiro

23 March 2019 7	Náutico	2–0	Altos	Recife
18:00 (UTC-3)	Wallace Pernambucano 76'; Maylson 83'	Report		Stadium: Estádio Eládio de Barros Carvalho (Aflitos); Attendance: 8,609; Referee: Rafael Carlos Salgueiro Lima

30 March 2019 8	Vitória	1–1	Náutico	Salvador
16:00 (UTC-3)	Ruy 11'	Report	Odilávio 32'	Stadium: Estádio Manoel Barradas (Barradão); Attendance: 5,102; Referee: Eduardo de Santana Nunes

==== Quarter-final ====
6 April 2019	Ceará	0–2	Náutico	Fortaleza
18:30 (UTC-3)		Report	Valdo 76' (o.g.); Thiago Fernandes 90'	Stadium: Estádio Governador Plácido Castelo (Castelão); Attendance: 35,140; Referee: Antônio Dib Moraes de Sousa

==== Semi-final ====
9 May 2019	Botafogo–PB	2–1	Náutico	João Pessoa
19:15 (UTC-3)	Nando 55'; Juninho 89'	Report	Fábio Alves 60' (o.g.)	Stadium: Estádio José Américo de Almeida Filho (Almeidão); Attendance: 8,462; Referee: Pablo Ramon Gonçalves Pinheiro

==== Record ====
Final Position	Points	Matches	Wins	Draws	Losses	Goals For	Goals Away	Avg%
3rd	18	10	5	3	2	16	11	60%

=== Campeonato Pernambucano ===
==== First stage ====
19 January 2019 1	Central	2–1	Náutico	Caruaru
16:00 (UTC-3)	Leandro Costa 37'; Bruno Oliveira 67'	Report	Matheus Carvalho 59'	Stadium: Estádio Luiz José de Lacerda (Lacerdão); Attendance: 2,827; Referee: Tiago Nascimento dos Santos

30 January 2019 2	Náutico	5–0	Petrolina	Recife
20:30 (UTC-3)	Wallace Pernambucano 2'; Robinho 23'; Fábio Matos 39'; Luiz Henrique 41'; Diego Silva 90'	Report		Stadium: Estádio Eládio de Barros Carvalho (Aflitos); Attendance: 3,554; Referee: Gilberto Rodrigues Castro Junior

27 January 2019 3	Sport	3–1	Náutico	Recife
17:00 (UTC-3)	Hernane 6'; Ezequiel 33'; Adryelson 57'	Report	Robinho 90+2'	Stadium: Estádio Adelmar da Costa Carvalho (Ilha do Retiro); Attendance: 8,332; Referee: Débora Cecília

6 February 2019 4	Náutico	2–0	Vitória das Tabocas	Recife
20:00 (UTC-3)	Wallace Pernambucano 70' (pen.), 90' (pen.)	Report		Stadium: Estádio Eládio de Barros Carvalho (Aflitos); Attendance: 2,392; Referee: Sebastião Rufino Filho

16 February 2019 5	Náutico	4–2	Flamengo de Arcoverde	Recife
16:00 (UTC-3)	André Krobel 10'; João Victor 32' (o.g.); Thiago Fernandes 58'; Rafael Ribeiro 87'	Report	Pedro Maycon 18' (pen.), 64'	Stadium: Estádio Eládio de Barros Carvalho (Aflitos); Attendance: 2,290; Referee: Gilberto Castro Júnior

24 February 2019 6	Afogados da Ingazeira	1–3	Náutico	Afogados da Ingazeira
17:00 (UTC-3)	Candinho 23'	Report	Thiago Fernandes 10'; Odilávio 19'; Hereda 70'	Stadium: Estádio Valdemar Viana de Araújo

27 February 2019 7	Náutico	1–0	Salgueiro	Recife
21:30 (UTC-3)	Josa 90'	Report		Stadium: Estádio Eládio de Barros Carvalho (Aflitos); Attendance: 1,967; Referee: Luiz Sobral

10 March 2019 8	América–PE	0–1	Náutico	Paulista
16:00 (UTC-3)		Report	Suéliton 53'	Stadium: Estádio Ademir Cunha

17 March 2019 9	Náutico	0–0	Santa Cruz	Recife
16:00 (UTC-3)		Report		Stadium: Estádio Eládio de Barros Carvalho (Aflitos); Referee: Pericles Bassols

==== Quarter-final ====
20 March 2019	Náutico	3–0	Vitória das Tabocas	Recife
21:30 (UTC-3)	Assis 14'; Luiz Henrique 27'; Wallace Pernambucano 75' (pen.)	Report		Stadium: Estádio Eládio de Barros Carvalho (Aflitos)

==== Semi-final ====
3 April 2019	Náutico	2–0	Afogados da Ingazeira	Recife
(UTC-3)	Luiz Henrique 43'; Assis 85'	Report		Stadium: Estádio Eládio de Barros Carvalho (Aflitos); Attendance: 11,962; Referee: Gilberto Castro Júnior

==== Finals ====
14 April 2019	Náutico	0–1	Sport	Recife
16:00 (UTC-3)		Report	Ezequiel 81'	Stadium: Estádio Eládio de Barros Carvalho (Aflitos); Attendance: 14,211; Referee: Wilton Pereira Sampaio

21 April 2019	Sport	1–2 (4–3 p)	Náutico	Recife
16:00 (UTC-3)	Guilherme 18' (pen.)	Report	Diego Silva 39'; Jiménez 82'	Stadium: Estádio Adelmar da Costa Carvalho (Ilha do Retiro); Attendance: 27,017; Referee: Ricardo Marques Ribeiro
	Penalties
	Élton (penalty scored); Norberto (penalty scored); Rafael Thyere (penalty scored); Ronaldo Henrique (penalty scored)		(penalty scored) Wallace Pernambuco; (penalty missed) Rafael Oliveira; (penalty scored) Jiménez; (penalty scored) Hereda; (penalty missed) Diego Silva

==== Record ====
Final Position	Points	Matches	Wins	Draws	Losses	Goals For	Goals Away	Avg%
2nd	28	13	9	1	3	25	10	71%

=== Copa do Brasil ===
==== First round ====
12 February 2019	Imperatriz	1–1	Náutico	Imperatriz
21:30 (UTC-3)	Daniel Barros 90+2' (pen.)		André Krobel 45+1'	Stadium: Estádio Frei Epifânio D'Abadia; Attendance: 6,522; Referee: Ivan da Silva Guimarães Júnior

==== Second round ====
20 February 2019	Santa Cruz	1–1 (4–2 p)	Náutico	Recife
21:30 (UTC-3)	Pipico 28'		Jorge Henrique 34'	Stadium: Estádio José do Rego Maciel (Arruda); Attendance: 15,288; Referee: Flávio Rodrigues de Souza
	Penalties
	Pipico (penalty scored); Guilherme Queiróz (penalty scored); Luiz Felipe (penalty scored); Marcos Martins (penalty scored)		(penalty missed) Tharcysio; (penalty scored) Thiago; (penalty scored) Robinho; (penalty missed) Luiz Henrique

==== Record ====
Final Position	Points	Matches	Wins	Draws	Losses	Goals For	Goals Away	Avg%
48th	2	2	0	2	0	2	2	33%

=== Série C ===
==== First stage ====
28 April 2019 1	ABC	2–0	Náutico	Natal
18:00 (UTC-3)	Anderson 26'; Rodrigo Rodrigues 60'	Report		Stadium: Estádio Maria Lamas Farache (Frasqueirão); Attendance: 1,976; Referee: Rafael Martins Diniz

4 May 2019 2	Náutico	4–2	Imperatriz	Recife
19:15 (UTC-3)	Andre Krobel 17'; Jimenez 39'; Wallace Pernambucano 55', 65'	Report	Valderrama 63'; Renan 75'	Stadium: Estádio Eládio de Barros Carvalho (Aflitos); Attendance: 3,305; Referee: Douglas Schwengber da Silva

12 May 2019 3	Náutico	0–1	Ferroviário	Recife
18:00 (UTC-3)		Report	Caxito 59'	Stadium: Estádio Eládio de Barros Carvalho (Aflitos); Attendance: 2,635; Referee: Diego da Silva Castro

18 May 2019 4	Treze	0–1	Náutico	Campina Grande
19:15 (UTC-3)		Report	Matheus Carvalho 19'	Stadium: Estádio Governador Ernani Sátyro (Amigão); Attendance: 5,959; Referee: Douglas Marques das Flores

25 May 2019 5	Confiança	1–1	Náutico	Aracaju
17:15 (UTC-3)	Bruninho 67'	Report	Luiz Henrique 60'	Stadium: Estádio Lourival Baptista (Batistão); Attendance: 4,168; Referee: Jonathan Antero Silva

1 June 2019 6	Náutico	2–2	Globo	Recife
17:15 (UTC-3)	Thiago Fernandes 15'; Assis 33'	Report	Negueba 68', 88'	Stadium: Estádio Eládio de Barros Carvalho (Aflitos); Attendance: 3,994; Referee: Salim Fende Chavez

10 June 2019 7	Sampaio Corrêa	0–2	Náutico	São Luís
20:00 (UTC-3)		Report	Wallace Pernambucano 27'; Thiago Fernandes 52'	Stadium: Estádio Governador João Castelo (Castelão); Attendance: 1,554; Referee: Lucas Paulo Torezin

22 June 2019 9	Santa Cruz	1–0	Náutico	Recife
18:00 (UTC-3)	Pipico 64'	Report		Stadium: Estádio José do Rego Maciel (Arruda); Attendance: 9,903; Referee: Eduardo Tomaz de Aquino Valadão

29 June 2019 10	Náutico	1–1	ABC	Recife
17:00 (UTC-3)	Thiago Fernandes 31'	Report	Ivan 59'	Stadium: Estádio Eládio de Barros Carvalho (Aflitos); Attendance: 5,215; Referee: Lucas Canetto Bellote

3 July 2019 8*	Náutico	2–1	Botafogo–PB	Recife
19:00 (UTC-3)	Thiago Fernandes 11'; Fernando 81'	Report	Neuton 85'	Stadium: Estádio Eládio de Barros Carvalho (Aflitos); Attendance: 4,382; Referee: Rodrigo da Fonseca Silva

8 July 2019 11	Imperatriz	2–0	Náutico	Imperatriz
20:00 (UTC-3)	Manoel 56'; Rayllan 90+5'	Report		Stadium: Estádio Municipal Frei Epifânio d’Abadia; Attendance: 3,450; Referee: Alexandre Vargas Tavares de Jesus

15 July 2019 12	Ferroviário	0–1	Náutico	Fortaleza
20:00 (UTC-3)		Report	Matheus Carvalho 90+2'	Stadium: Estádio Governador Plácido Castelo (Castelão); Attendance: 2,403; Referee: Dyorgines Jose Padovani de Andrade

21 July 2019 13	Náutico	1–0	Treze	Recife
18:00 (UTC-3)	Rafael Nascimento 79'	Report		Stadium: Estádio Eládio de Barros Carvalho (Aflitos); Attendance: 9,687; Referee: Denis da Silva Ribeiro Serafim

26 July 2019 14	Náutico	3–1	Confiança	Recife
20:00 (UTC-3)	Thiago Fernandes 38'; Rafael Nascimento 50'; Matheus Carvalho 84'	Report	Vinicius Simon 18'	Stadium: Estádio Eládio de Barros Carvalho (Aflitos); Attendance: 9,997; Referee: Roger Goulart

5 August 2019 15	Globo	2–0	Náutico	Ceará-Mirim
20:00 (UTC-3)	Max 17'; Negueba 88'	Report		Stadium: Estádio Manoel Dantas Barretto (Barrettão); Attendance: 517; Referee: Diego da Costa Cidral

12 August 2019 16	Náutico	2–1	Sampaio Corrêa	Recife
20:00 (UTC-3)	Josa 43'; Jimenez 55'	Report	Salatiel 27'	Stadium: Estádio Eládio de Barros Carvalho (Aflitos); Attendance: 9,419; Referee: Leandro Bizzio Marinho

17 August 2019 17	Botafogo–PB	0–1	Náutico	João Pessoa
17:00 (UTC-3)		Report	Álvaro Oliveira 65'	Stadium: Estádio José Américo de Almeida Filho (Almeidão); Attendance: 7,298; Referee: Thiago Duarte Peixoto

24 August 2019 18	Náutico	3–1	Santa Cruz	Recife
17:00 (UTC-3)	Diego Silva 30'; Jean Carlos 45+1'; Jhonnatan 49'	Report	Dudu 52'	Stadium: Estádio Eládio de Barros Carvalho (Aflitos); Attendance: 9,689; Referee: Wagner do Nascimento Magalhães

==== Quarter-finals ====
1 September 2019	Paysandu	0–0	Náutico	Belém
18:00 (UTC-3)		Report		Stadium: Estádio Olímpico do Pará (Mangueirão); Attendance: 22,815; Referee: Anderson Daronco

8 September 2019	Náutico	2–2 (5–3 p)	Paysandu	Recife
18:00 (UTC-3)	Álvaro Oliveira 64'; Jean Carlos 90+8'	Report	Vinícius Leite 29'; Nicolas 55'	Stadium: Estádio Eládio de Barros Carvalho (Aflitos); Attendance: 16,662; Referee: Leandro Pedro Vuaden
	Penalties
	Jean Carlos (penalty scored); Jhonnatan (penalty scored); Willian Simões (penalty scored); Josa (penalty scored); Matheus Carvalho (penalty scored)		(penalty scored) Caique Oliveira; (penalty scored) Tony; (penalty missed) Wellington Reis; (penalty scored) Anderson Uchôa

==== Semi-finals ====
15 September 2019	Juventude	2–1	Náutico	Caxias do Sul
18:00 (UTC-3)	Gabriel Poveda 69'; Eltinho 90+4'	Report	Álvaro Oliveira 36'	Stadium: Estádio Alfredo Jaconi; Attendance: 10,694; Referee: Ricardo Marques Ribeiro

22 September 2019	Náutico	2–1 (4–3 p)	Juventude	Recife
18:00 (UTC-3)	Álvaro Oliveira 16', 31'	Report	Genilson 78'	Stadium: Estádio Eládio de Barros Carvalho (Aflitos); Attendance: 13,084; Referee: Bráulio da Silva Machado
	Penalties
	Jimenez (penalty scored); Josa (penalty scored); Maylson (penalty scored); Álvaro Oliveira (penalty missed); Matheus Carvalho (penalty scored)		(penalty scored) Eltinho; (penalty scored) Genilson; (penalty scored) Braian Rodríguez; (penalty missed) Denner; (penalty missed) Dalberto

==== Finals ====
29 September 2019	Náutico	3–1	Sampaio Corrêa	Recife
16:00 (UTC-3)	João Victor 28' (o.g.); Camutanga 55'; Jhonnatan 87'	Report	Roney 33'	Stadium: Estádio Eládio de Barros Carvalho (Aflitos); Attendance: 16,148; Referee: Héber Roberto Lopes

6 October 2019	Sampaio Corrêa	2–2	Náutico	São Luís
16:00 (UTC-3)	Everton 13'; Salatiel 82'	Report	Álvaro Oliveira 51'; Matheus Carvalho 85'	Stadium: Estádio Governador João Castelo (Castelão); Attendance: 26,809; Referee: Flávio Rodrigues de Souza

(*) Postponed matches due to changes in competition schedules

==== Record ====
Final Position	Points	Matches	Wins	Draws	Losses	Goals For	Goals Away	Avg%
1st	42	24	12	6	6	34	26	58%
