= Farías =

Farías, or Farias (without the accent), is a Portuguese and Spanish surname. It is a variation of the Portuguese surname Faria.

== People ==
- Agustín Farías, Argentine professional footballer
- Alexandre Farias de Lima Júnior (born 1989), Brazilian footballer
- Alisson Farias (born 1996), Brazilian footballer
- André Filipe Farias Marques (born 1987), Portuguese footballer
- André Oliveira Farias (born 1979), Brazilian footballer
- Anna Maria Farias, American lawyer and government official
- Augusto Farias, Brazilian politician, brother of Paulo Cesar Farias
- Bruna Farias (born 1992), Brazilian sprinter
- Bruno Candido Farias (born 1987), Brazilian footballer
- Carlos Farias (born 1976), Chilean-born soccer player
- César Farías, Venezuelan football manager
- Diego Farias (born 1990), Brazilian footballer
- Diogo da Silva Farias (born 1990), Brazilian footballer
- Ediglê Quaresma Farias (born 1978), Brazilian footballer
- Edson Rodrigues Farias (born 1992), Brazilian footballer
- Eleílson Farias de Moura (born 1985), Brazilian footballer
- Érica Farías, Argentine professional boxer
- Erika Farías, Venezuelan politician
- Ernesto Farías, Argentine professional footballer
- Facundo Farías, Argentine professional footballer
- Fernando Camilo Farias (born 1986), Brazilian footballer
- Gómez Farías (disambiguation)
- Jeff Farias, American talk-show host
- Jonathan Farías, Argentine professional footballer
- José Farías, Argentine football manager
- Julio Farías Cabello, Argentine rugby union player
- Leandro Farias (born 1983), Brazilian-born Togo footballer
- Lindbergh Farias (born 1969), Brazilian politician
- Lucas Farias (born 1994), Brazilian footballer
- Marlon Farias Castelo Branco (born 1985), Brazilian footballer
- Paola Farías, Ecuadorian actress and former beauty pageant
- Paulo Cesar Farias (1945–1996), central figure in 1992 Brazilian corruption scandal
- Perla Farías, Venezuelan director, producer, screenwriter and executive
- Roberto Farias (1932–2018), Brazilian film director
- Rogelio Farías, Chilean football midfielder
- Sérgio Farias (born 1967), Brazilian football manager
- Vanderlei Farias da Silva (born 1984), Brazilian footballer
- Victor Farías, Chilean historian and author of communist literature
- Wanderson Cristaldo Farias (born 1988), Brazilian footballer
- Willian Farias (born 1989), Brazilian footballer
- Zenon de Souza Farias (born 1954), Brazilian former football player

== Places ==
- Farias Brito, municipality in Brazil
