= 2019 Campeonato Pernambucano =

Campeonato Pernambucano
- Season: 2019
- Champions: Sport (42nd title)
- Relegated: América; Flamengo de Arcoverde
- 2020 Copa do Brasil: Afogados; Náutico; Sport; Santa Cruz (via RNC)
- 2020 Copa do Nordeste: Sport; Santa Cruz (via RNC)
- 2020 Pré-Copa do Nordeste: Náutico (via RNC)
- 2020 Série D: Afogados; Central; Salgueiro
- Matches played: 54
- Goals scored: 153 (2.83 per match)
- Best Player: Ezequiel
- Top goalscorer: Hernane (9 goals)
- Total attendance: 202,966 (3,759 per match)

The 2019 Campeonato Pernambucano (officially the Pernambucano da Série A1 de 2019) was the 105th edition of the state championship of Pernambuco organized by FPF. The championship began on 19 January and ended on 21 April.

In the Finals, Sport and the defending champions Náutico tied 2–2 on aggregate. Sport won on penalties to win their 42nd Campeonato Pernambucano title. As champions, Sport qualified for the 2020 Copa do Brasil and 2020 Copa do Nordeste.

Náutico and Afogados qualified for 2020 Copa do Brasil as runners-up and third placed team, respectively.

Santa Cruz (best second-team in the 2019 RNC) qualified for the 2020 Copa do Nordeste. Náutico qualified for the 2020 Pré-Copa do Nordeste via RNC.

== Teams ==
Ten teams were competing, nine returning from the 2018 and Petrolina, promoted as champions of 2018 Pernambucano A2 Championship.

Club	City	Stadium	Coordinates	Capacity
Afogados	Afogados da Ingazeira	Valdemar Viana de Araújo	7.7585°S 37.6334°W	1,735
América	Recife	Ademir Cunha (Paulista)^{[1]}	7.9459°S 34.8904°W	12,000
Central	Caruaru	Lacerdão	8.2786°S 35.9752°W	19,478
Flamengo de Arcoverde	Arcoverde	Áureo Bradley	8.4199°S 37.0583°W	3,000
Náutico	Recife	Aflitos	8.0406°S 34.8990°W	22,856
Petrolina	Petrolina	Paulo de Souza Coelho	9.3911°S 40.5034°W	5,000
Salgueiro	Salgueiro	Cornélio de Barros	8.0761°S 39.1194°W	12,070
Santa Cruz	Recife	Arruda^{[2]}	8.0267°S 34.8933°W	60,044
Sport	Recife	Ilha do Retiro	8.0629°S 34.9051°W	32,983
Vitória das Tabocas	Vitória de Santo Antão	Arena Pernambuco (São Lourenço da Mata)^{[3]}	8.0406°S 35.0104°W	44,300

^{1} América played their home match against Sport (Feb. 3) at Arena Pernambuco.
^{2} Santa Cruz played their home matches against América (Jan. 20) and Afogados (Jan. 29) at Arena Pernambuco.
^{3} Vitória das Tabocas played their home matches at Arena Pernambuco instead of their regular stadium Severino Cândido Carneiro, Vitória de Santo Antão.

== Schedule ==
The schedule of the competition was as follows.

First Stage
Round 1:	19–20 January	
Round 2:	23–24 and 30 January	
Round 3:	27 and 29–30 January	
Round 4:	3, 6 and 13 February	
Round 5:	10, 16 February and 6 March	
Round 6:	17 and 23–24 February	
Round 7:	26–28 February	
Round 8:	10 and 13–14 March	
Round 9:	17 March	
Final Stages
Quarter-finals	20, 24 and 27 March	
Semi-finals	3 and 7 April	
Third place match	13 April	
	First leg	Second leg
Finals	14 April	21 April

== First stage ==
In the first stage, each team played the other nine teams in a single round-robin tournament. The teams were ranked according to points (3 points for a win, 1 point for a draw, and 0 points for a loss). If tied on points, the following criteria would be used to determine the ranking: 1. Wins; 2. Goal difference; 3. Goals scored; 4. Head-to-head; 5. Fewest red cards; 6. Fewest yellow cards; 7. Draw in the headquarters of the FPF.

Top eight teams advanced to the quarter-finals of the final stages. The two teams with the lowest number of points were relegated to the 2020 Campeonato Pernambucano A2. Top three teams not already qualified for 2020 Série A, Série B or Série C qualified for 2020 Série D.

=== Standings ===
Pos	Team	Pld	W	D	L	GF	GA	GD	Pts	Qualification or relegation
1	Sport	9	7	0	2	21	7	+14	21	Advance to final stages
2	Náutico	9	6	1	2	18	8	+10	19	Advance to final stages
3	Santa Cruz	9	5	2	2	12	8	+4	17	Advance to final stages
4	Salgueiro	9	5	1	3	21	15	+6	16	Advance to final stages and qualify for Série D
5	Central	9	5	1	3	12	9	+3	16	Advance to final stages and qualify for Série D
6	Afogados	9	3	3	3	13	17	−4	12	Advance to final stages and qualify for Série D
7	Vitória das Tabocas	9	2	3	4	8	14	−6	9	Advance to final stages
8	Petrolina	9	2	2	5	5	13	−8	8	Advance to final stages
9	América	9	0	1	8	3	16	−13	1	Relegation to Pernambucano A2
10	Flamengo de Arcoverde (Note: Flamengo de Arcoverde were deducted thirteen points for fielding the ineligible player Júnior Silva.)	9	2	2	5	13	19	−6	−5	Relegation to Pernambucano A2

Source: FPF

=== Results ===
Home \ Away	AFO	AME	CEN	FLA	NAU	PET	SAL	SAN	SPO	VIT
Afogados	—	—	—	2–1	1–3	1–0	2–2	—	—	—
América	1–2	—	1–2	—	0–1	—	—	—	0–2	—
Central	1–1	—	—	—	2–1	0–1	3–2	—	1–2	—
Flamengo de Arcoverde	—	2–1	0–2	—	—	—	—	1–1	—	1–1
Náutico	—	—	—	4–2	—	5–0	1–0	0–0	—	2–0
Petrolina	—	0–0	—	2–0	—	—	—	1–2	—	0–0
Salgueiro	—	3–0	—	4–3	—	2–1	—	2–0	—	6–1
Santa Cruz	4–1	3–0	1–0	—	—	—	—	—	1–0	—
Sport	3–1	—	—	2–3	3–1	3–0	4–0	—	—	—
Vitória das Tabocas	2–2	1–0	0–1	—	—	—	—	3–0	0–2	—

Source: FPF
Legend: Blue = home team win; Yellow = draw; Red = away team win.

== Final stages ==
Starting from the quarter-finals, the teams played a single-elimination tournament with the following rules:

- Quarter-finals, semi-finals and third place match were played on a single-leg basis, with the higher-seeded team hosting the leg.
  - If tied, the penalty shoot-out would be used to determine the winner.
- Finals were played on a home-and-away two-legged basis, with the higher-seeded team hosting the second leg.
  - If tied on aggregate, the penalty shoot-out would be used to determine the winner.
- Extra time would be not played and away goals rule would be not used in final stages.

=== Bracket ===
Quarter-finals
2	Náutico	3
7	Vitória das Tabocas	0
3	Santa Cruz	1 (1)
6	Afogados (p)	1 (3)
1	Sport	4
8	Petrolina	0
4	Salgueiro	2
5	Central	1

Semi-finals
2	Náutico	2
6	Afogados	0
1	Sport	3
4	Salgueiro	1

Finals
2	Náutico	0	2	2 (3)
1	Sport (p)	1	1	2 (4)
Third place
4	Salgueiro	2
6	Afogados	3

=== Quarter-finals ===
Team 1	Score	Team 2
Sport	4–0	Petrolina
Náutico	3–0	Vitória das Tabocas
Santa Cruz	1–1 (1–3 p)	Afogados
Salgueiro	2–1	Central

==== Matches ====
24 March 2019
16:00

Sport	4–0	Petrolina
Luan 35'; Hernane 42' (pen.); Leandrinho 58'; Ezequiel 81'	Report

Estádio Ilha do Retiro, Recife
Attendance: 13,003
Referee: Péricles Bassols Pegado Cortez

20 March 2019
21:30

Náutico	3–0	Vitória das Tabocas
Assis 13'; Luiz Henrique 27'; Wallace Pernambucano 74' (pen.)	Report

Estádio dos Aflitos, Recife
Attendance: 4,180
Referee: Diego Fernando Silva de Lima

27 March 2019
19:15

Santa Cruz	1–1	Afogados
Allan Dias 65'	Report	Rodrigo 44'
Penalties
Pipico (penalty scored); Neto Costa (penalty missed); Patrick Vieira (penalty missed); Allan Dias (penalty missed)	1–3	(penalty missed) Douglas; (penalty scored) Jader; (penalty scored) Márcio; (penalty scored) Thalison

Estádio do Arruda, Recife
Attendance: 3,259
Referee: Deborah Cecília Cruz Correia

20 March 2019
19:00

Salgueiro	2–1	Central
Müller Fernandes 67'; Willian Anicete 90+3'	Report	Marlon 19'

Estádio Cornélio de Barros, Salgueiro
Attendance: 1,235
Referee: Luiz Cláudio Sobral

=== Semi-finals ===
Team 1	Score	Team 2
Sport	3–1	Salgueiro
Náutico	2–0	Afogados

==== Matches ====
7 April 2019
16:00

Sport	3–1	Salgueiro
Hernane 19', 53'; Ronaldo 90'	Report	Igor João 71'

Estádio Ilha do Retiro, Recife
Attendance: 22,117
Referee: Diego Fernando Silva de Lima

Sport qualified for the 2020 Copa do Brasil.

3 April 2019
19:15

Náutico	2–0	Afogados
Luiz Henrique 42'; Assis 84'	Report

Estádio dos Aflitos, Recife
Attendance: 11,962
Referee: Gilberto Rodrigues Castro Júnior

Náutico qualified for the 2020 Copa do Brasil.

=== Third place match ===
13 April 2019
20:00

Salgueiro	2–3	Afogados
Tarcísio 33'; Müller Fernandes 35'	Report	Diego Ceará 17'; Madson 36'; Luciano Grafite 86'

Estádio Cornélio de Barros, Salgueiro
Attendance: 925
Referee: Diego Fernando Silva de Lima

Afogados qualified for the 2020 Copa do Brasil.

=== Finals ===
Team 1	Agg.	Team 2	1st leg	2nd leg
Náutico	2–2 (3–4 p)	Sport	0–1	2–1

==== Matches ====
14 April 2019
16:00

Náutico	0–1	Sport
	Report	Ezequiel 80'

Estádio dos Aflitos, Recife
Attendance: 14,211
Referee: Wilton Sampaio (Goiás)

21 April 2019
16:00

Sport	1–2	Náutico
Guilherme 17' (pen.)	Report	Diego Silva 39'; Jiménez 81'
Penalties
Élton (penalty scored); Norberto (penalty scored); Rafael Thyere (penalty scored); Ronaldo (penalty scored)	4–3	(penalty scored) Wallace Pernambucano; (penalty missed) Rafael Oliveira; (penalty scored) Jiménez; (penalty scored) Hereda; (penalty missed) Diego Silva

Estádio Ilha do Retiro, Recife
Attendance: 27,017
Referee: Ricardo Marques (Minas Gerais)

Sport qualified for the 2020 Copa do Nordeste.

2019 Campeonato Pernambucano Champions

Sport

42nd title

== Top goalscorers ==
Rank	Player	Team	Goals
1	Hernane	Sport	9
2	Diego Ceará	Afogados	6
2	Müller Fernandes	Salgueiro	6
4	Willian Anicete	Salgueiro	5
5	Allan Dias	Santa Cruz	4
5	Erikys Júnior	Flamengo de Arcoverde	4
5	Ezequiel	Sport	4
5	Guilherme	Sport	4
5	Leandro Costa	Central	4
5	Pedro Maycon	Flamengo de Arcoverde	4
5	Rodrigo	Afogados	4
5	Wallace Pernambucano	Náutico	4

Source:FPF

== 2019 Campeonato Pernambucano team ==
The 2019 Campeonato Pernambucano team was a squad consisting of the eleven most impressive players at the tournament.

Pos.	Player	Team
GK	Mailson	Sport
DF	Hereda	Náutico
DF	Rafael Thyere	Sport
DF	Adryelson	Sport
DF	Sander	Sport
MF	Josa	Náutico
MF	Charles	Sport
MF	Guilherme	Sport
FW	Ezequiel ^{a}	Sport
FW	Hernane ^{b}	Sport
FW	Wallace Pernambucano	Náutico
Head coach	Guto Ferreira	Sport
Breakthrough player	Thiago	Náutico

a. Best player
b. Top scorer

Head coach
(Brazil) Guto Ferreira

Source:Globo
