= Gómez Farías (disambiguation) =

Valentín Gómez Farías (1781 – 1858) was the President of Mexico for five short and non-consecutive periods.

Gómez Farías may also refer to:

== Places ==
- Gómez Farías Municipality, Chihuahua
- Gómez Farías Municipality, Jalisco
- Gómez Farías Municipality, Tamaulipas
- Otumba de Gómez Farías, State of Mexico
- Valentín Gómez Farías, Chihuahua
- Gómez Farías metro station, a station on Line 1 of the Mexico City Metro
