= 2020 Campeonato Brasileiro Série D =

Campeonato Brasileiro Série D
- Season: 2020
- Dates: 6 September 2020 – 6 February 2021
- Champions: Mirassol (1st title)
- Promoted: Altos; Floresta; Mirassol; Novorizontino
- Matches: 518
- Goals: 1,392 (2.69 per match)
- Top goalscorer: Wallace Pernambucano; Zé Love (12 goals each)
- Biggest home win: Mirassol 8–0 Nacional-PR; Group A7, R7, 17 October
- Biggest away win: São Caetano 0–9 Pelotas; Group A8, R9, 24 October
- Highest scoring: 10 goals Jaciobá 3–7 Potiguar de Mossoró; Group A4, R9, 25 October

The 2020 Campeonato Brasileiro Série D was a football competition held in Brazil, equivalent to the fourth division. The competition was originally scheduled to begin on 3 May and end on 22 November, however due to the COVID-19 pandemic the tournament was rescheduled for 6 September 2020 – 6 February 2021.

Sixty-eight teams competed in the tournament. Sixty-four teams qualified from their state leagues and cups, and four relegated from the 2019 Campeonato Brasileiro Série C (ABC, Atlético Acreano, Globo and Luverdense). Luverdense declined to participate being replaced by Sinop.

The match Guarany de Sobral v Salgueiro, scheduled for 20 September 2020 (Group A3 1st round), was postponed after 12 Guarany de Sobral players tested positive for COVID-19.

In the Group A8 12th round, (14 November 2020), São Caetano players refused to play their away match against Marcílio Dias in protest over unpaid wages. Marcílio Dias was awarded a 3–0 win by forfeit.

Altos, Floresta, Mirassol, and Novorizontino qualified for the semi-finals and were promoted to the 2021 Campeonato Brasileiro Série C.

In the finals, Mirassol defeated Floresta 2–0 on aggregate to win their first title.

== Format changes ==
A preliminary stage was played during this season. In the preliminary stage, eight teams were drawn into four ties, with the winners of each tie advancing to the group stage. The group stage had 64 teams, 60 teams qualified directly and four teams decided in the preliminary stage. The 64 teams were drawn into eight groups of eight teams each. The top four teams of each group qualified for the round of 32.

== Teams ==
Location of teams in 2020 Série D

=== Federation ranking ===
The number of teams from each state was chosen based on the CBF State Ranking.

Rank	Federation	Coeff.	Teams	Notes
1	(São Paulo (state)) São Paulo	84,166	4	
2	(Rio de Janeiro (state)) Rio de Janeiro	50,130	3	
3	Minas Gerais	45,014	3	
4	Rio Grande do Sul	42,149	3	
5	(Paraná (state)) Paraná	34,612	3	
6	(Santa Catarina (state)) Santa Catarina	31,777	3	
7	Bahia	21,631	3	
8	Goiás	19,856	3	
9	Pernambuco	19,369	3	
10	Ceará	16,853	2	
11	Alagoas	11,986	2	
12	Pará	9,746	2	
13	Mato Grosso	9,100	2	+1 (C)
14	Maranhão	7,643	2	
15	Rio Grande do Norte	6,801	2	+2 (C)
16	Paraíba	5,313	2	
17	Sergipe	4,128	2	
18	(Acre (state)) Acre	3,305	2	+1 (C)
19	Piauí	2,573	2	
20	(Amazonas (Brazilian state)) Amazonas	2,245	2	
21	(Federal District (Brazil)) Distrito Federal	2,237	2	
22	Mato Grosso do Sul	2,059	2	
23	Espírito Santo	1,910	2	
24	Tocantins	1,876	2	
25	Rondônia	1,784	2	
26	Amapá	1,770	2	
27	Roraima	1,739	2	

=== Participating teams ===
Teams in italic played the preliminary stage. The teams were:

Federation	Team	Home city	Qualification method
(Acre (state)) Acre	Galvez	Rio Branco	2019 Campeonato Acriano runners-up
(Acre (state)) Acre	Rio Branco	Rio Branco	2019 Campeonato Acriano 3rd place
(Acre (state)) Acre	Atlético Acreano	Rio Branco	2019 Série C Group B 10th place
Alagoas	Coruripe	Coruripe	2019 Campeonato Alagoano 3rd place
Alagoas	Jaciobá	Pão de Açúcar	2019 Campeonato Alagoano 4th place
Amapá	Santos	Macapá	2019 Campeonato Amapaense champions
Amapá	Ypiranga	Macapá	2019 Campeonato Amapaense runners-up
(Amazonas (Brazilian state)) Amazonas	Fast Clube	Manaus	2019 Campeonato Amazonense runners-up
(Amazonas (Brazilian state)) Amazonas	Nacional-AM	Manaus	2019 Campeonato Amazonense 3rd place
Bahia	Bahia de Feira	Feira de Santana	2019 Campeonato Baiano runners-up
Bahia	Atlético de Alagoinhas	Alagoinhas	2019 Campeonato Baiano 3rd place
Bahia	Vitória da Conquista	Vitória da Conquista	2019 Campeonato Baiano 4th place
Ceará	Floresta	Fortaleza	2019 Campeonato Cearense 3rd place
Ceará	Guarany de Sobral	Sobral	2019 Campeonato Cearense 4th place
Espírito Santo	Vitória	Vitória	2019 Campeonato Capixaba champions
Espírito Santo	Real Noroeste	Águia Branca	2019 Copa Espírito Santo champions
(Federal District (Brazil)) Federal District	Gama	Gama	2019 Campeonato Brasiliense champions
(Federal District (Brazil)) Federal District	Brasiliense	Taguatinga	2019 Campeonato Brasiliense runners-up
Goiás	Goiânia	Goiânia	2019 Campeonato Goiano 4th place
Goiás	Goianésia	Goianésia	2019 Campeonato Goiano 6th place
Goiás	Aparecidense^{[a]}	Aparecida de Goiânia	2019 Campeonato Goiano 7th place
Maranhão	Moto Club	São Luís	2019 Campeonato Maranhense runners-up
Maranhão	Juventude Samas	São Mateus do Maranhão	2019 Copa Federação Maranhense de Futebol champions
Mato Grosso	CEOV	Várzea Grande	2019 Campeonato Mato-Grossense runners-up
Mato Grosso	União Rondonópolis	Rondonópolis	2019 Campeonato Mato-Grossense 3rd place
Mato Grosso	Sinop^{[b]}	Sinop	2019 Campeonato Mato-Grossense 5th place
Mato Grosso do Sul	Águia Negra	Rio Brilhante	2019 Campeonato Sul-Mato-Grossense champions
Mato Grosso do Sul	Aquidauanense	Aquidauana	2019 Campeonato Sul-Mato-Grossense runners-up
Minas Gerais	Caldense	Poços de Caldas	2019 Campeonato Mineiro 6th place
Minas Gerais	Tupynambás	Juiz de Fora	2019 Campeonato Mineiro 8th place
Minas Gerais	Villa Nova^{[c]}	Nova Lima	2019 Campeonato Mineiro 9th place
Pará	Independente	Tucuruí	2019 Campeonato Paraense runners-up
Pará	Bragantino	Bragança	2019 Campeonato Paraense 3rd place
Paraíba	Campinense	Campina Grande	2019 Campeonato Paraibano runners-up
Paraíba	Atlético Cajazeirense	Cajazeiras	2019 Campeonato Paraibano 3rd place
(Paraná (state)) Paraná	Toledo	Toledo	2019 Campeonato Paranaense runners-up
(Paraná (state)) Paraná	FC Cascavel	Cascavel	2019 Campeonato Paranaense 7th place
(Paraná (state)) Paraná	Nacional-PR	Rolândia	2019 Taça FPF champions
Pernambuco	Salgueiro	Salgueiro	2019 Campeonato Pernambucano first stage 4th place
Pernambuco	Central	Caruaru	2019 Campeonato Pernambucano first stage 5th place
Pernambuco	Afogados	Afogados da Ingazeira	2019 Campeonato Pernambucano first stage 6th place
Piauí	River	Teresina	2019 Campeonato Piauiense champions
Piauí	Altos	Altos	2019 Campeonato Piauiense runners-up
(Rio de Janeiro (state)) Rio de Janeiro	Bangu	Rio de Janeiro	2019 Campeonato Carioca 3rd place
(Rio de Janeiro (state)) Rio de Janeiro	Cabofriense	Cabo Frio	2019 Campeonato Carioca 6th place
(Rio de Janeiro (state)) Rio de Janeiro	Portuguesa	Rio de Janeiro	2019 Copa Rio runners-up
Rio Grande do Norte	América de Natal	Natal	2019 Campeonato Potiguar champions
Rio Grande do Norte	Potiguar de Mossoró	Mossoró	2019 Campeonato Potiguar 4th place
Rio Grande do Norte	ABC	Natal	2019 Série C Group A 9th place
Rio Grande do Norte	Globo	Ceará-Mirim	2019 Série C Group A 10th place
Rio Grande do Sul	Caxias	Caxias do Sul	2019 Campeonato Gaúcho 3rd place
Rio Grande do Sul	São Luiz	Ijuí	2019 Campeonato Gaúcho 4th place
Rio Grande do Sul	Pelotas	Pelotas	2019 Copa FGF champions
Rondônia	Vilhenense	Vilhena	2019 Campeonato Rondoniense champions
Rondônia	Ji-Paraná	Ji-Paraná	2019 Campeonato Rondoniense runners-up
Roraima	São Raimundo	Boa Vista	2019 Campeonato Roraimense champions
Roraima	Baré	Boa Vista	2019 Campeonato Roraimense runners-up
(Santa Catarina (state)) Santa Catarina	Marcílio Dias	Itajaí	2019 Campeonato Catarinense 5th place
(Santa Catarina (state)) Santa Catarina	Joinville	Joinville	2019 Campeonato Catarinense 7th place
(Santa Catarina (state)) Santa Catarina	Tubarão	Tubarão	2019 Campeonato Catarinense 8th place
(São Paulo (state)) São Paulo	Novorizontino	Novo Horizonte	2019 Campeonato Paulista 6th place
(São Paulo (state)) São Paulo	Ferroviária	Araraquara	2019 Campeonato Paulista 7th place
(São Paulo (state)) São Paulo	Mirassol^{[d]}	Mirassol	2019 Campeonato Paulista 12th place
(São Paulo (state)) São Paulo	São Caetano	São Caetano do Sul	2019 Copa Paulista champions
Sergipe	Freipaulistano^{[e]}	Frei Paulo	2019 Campeonato Sergipano champions
Sergipe	Itabaiana	Itabaiana	2019 Campeonato Sergipano runners-up
Tocantins	Palmas	Palmas	2019 Campeonato Tocantinense champions
Tocantins	Tocantinópolis	Tocantinópolis	2019 Campeonato Tocantinense runners-up

^{a} CRAC, 2019 Campeonato Goiano 5th place, declined to participate in the Série D on 22 July 2020, being replaced by Aparecidense (2019 Campeonato Goiano 7th place).
^{b} Luverdense, 2019 Série C Group B 9th place, declined to participate in the Série D on 14 August 2020, being replaced by Sinop (2019 Campeonato Mato-Grossense 5th place).
^{c} Patrocinense, 2019 Campeonato Mineiro 7th place, declined to participate in the Série D on 12 March 2020, being replaced by Villa Nova (2019 Campeonato Mineiro 9th place).
^{d} Red Bull Brasil, 2019 Campeonato Paulista 5th place, declined to participate in the Série D on 11 December 2019, being replaced by Mirassol (2019 Campeonato Paulista 12th place).
^{e} Associação Desportiva Frei Paulistano was renamed as Associação Desportiva Freipaulistano on 22 April 2019.

== Competition format ==
In the preliminary stage, eight teams from the worst ranked federations in the CBF ranking were drawn into four ties, with the winners of each tie advancing to the group stage. In the group stage, the remaining 60 teams and the 4 four teams qualified from the preliminary stage were divided into eight groups of eight organized regionally. Top four teams qualified for the round of 32. From the round of 32 on the competition was played as a knock-out tournament with each round contested over two legs.

== Preliminary stage ==
It was played from 6 to 13 September 2020. The lowest-seeded teams from the eight worst ranked federations in the 2020 CBF ranking (Amazonas, Distrito Federal, Mato Grosso do Sul, Espírito Santo, Tocantins, Rondônia, Amapá, and Roraima) competed to decide four places in the group stage.

Each tie was played on a home-and-away two-legged basis. If tied on aggregate, the away goals rule would not be used, extra time would not be played, and the penalty shoot-out would be used to determine the winners (Regulations Article 18).

=== Matches ===
Team 1	Agg.	Team 2	1st leg	2nd leg
Ji-Paraná (Rondônia)	4–2	(Amazonas (Brazilian state)) Nacional-AM	2–1	2–1
Baré (Roraima)	4–0	(Amapá) Ypiranga	3–0	1–0
Real Noroeste (Espírito Santo)	6–2	(Mato Grosso do Sul) Aquidauanense	3–1	3–1
Tocantinópolis (Tocantins)	1–4	(Federal District (Brazil)) Brasiliense	1–0	0–4

== Group stage ==
In the group stage, each group played on a home-and-away round-robin basis. The teams were ranked according to points (3 points for a win, 1 point for a draw, and 0 points for a loss). If tied on points, the following criteria would be used to determine the ranking: 1. Wins; 2. Goal difference; 3. Goals scored; 4. Head-to-head (if the tie was only between two teams); 5. Fewest red cards; 6. Fewest yellow cards; 7. Draw in the headquarters of the Brazilian Football Confederation (Regulations Article 13).

The top four teams qualified for the round of 32.

=== Group A1 ===
Pos	Team	Pld	W	D	L	GF	GA	GD	Pts	Qualification	BRA	FAS	GAL	RIO	IND	JIP	VIL	ATL
1	(Pará) Bragantino	14	8	3	3	28	15	+13	27	Advance to round of 32		3–1	2–0	2–1	2–0	0–0	3–1	4–0
2	(Amazonas (Brazilian state)) Fast Clube	14	7	5	2	26	13	+13	26	Advance to round of 32	2–1		1–1	0–0	4–0	3–2	1–1	1–0
3	(Acre (state)) Galvez	14	7	3	4	26	19	+7	24	Advance to round of 32	0–3	1–5		0–0	7–1	3–1	2–1	2–0
4	(Acre (state)) Rio Branco	14	5	6	3	17	14	+3	21	Advance to round of 32	1–1	0–2	1–1		2–1	4–1	2–1	0–0
5	(Pará) Independente	14	5	2	7	20	30	−10	17		3–2	1–0	0–2	3–2		1–2	2–1	4–1
6	(Rondônia) Ji-Paraná	14	4	4	6	16	21	−5	16		4–0	0–0	0–4	1–2	1–0		1–0	1–1
7	(Rondônia) Vilhenense	14	2	5	7	15	22	−7	11		0–3	1–4	4–0	0–0	1–1	1–0		1–1
8	(Acre (state)) Atlético Acreano	14	0	8	6	15	29	−14	8		2–2	2–2	0–3	1–2	3–3	2–2	2–2	

Source: CBF
Legend: Blue = home team win; Yellow = draw; Red = away team win.
Rules for classification: 1) points; 2) wins; 3) goal difference; 4) goals scored; 5) head-to-head results (only between 2 teams); 6) fewest red cards; 7) fewest yellow cards; 8) draw.

=== Group A2 ===
Pos	Team	Pld	W	D	L	GF	GA	GD	Pts	Qualification	ALT	RIV	MOT	JUV	SAO	BAR	SAN	SIN
1	(Piauí) Altos	14	10	0	4	27	16	+11	30	Advance to round of 32		3–1	3–1	3–1	0–1	2–1	2–0	2–1
2	(Piauí) River	14	9	2	3	22	12	+10	29	Advance to round of 32	1–2		2–1	1–0	1–0	2–2	3–1	2–0
3	(Maranhão) Moto Club	14	7	4	3	22	15	+7	25	Advance to round of 32	2–1	2–0		2–0	1–1	1–0	2–0	3–0
4	(Maranhão) Juventude Samas	14	7	2	5	21	13	+8	23	Advance to round of 32	1–2	0–1	4–1		1–0	1–1	4–0	3–0
5	(Roraima) São Raimundo	14	6	3	5	16	8	+8	21		3–0	0–0	0–2	1–1		6–0	2–0	1–0
6	(Roraima) Baré	14	3	4	7	15	27	−12	13		2–1	1–3	2–2	0–1	1–0		0–0	2–3
7	(Amapá) Santos	14	3	2	9	12	26	−14	11		0–4	0–3	2–2	1–2	0–1	3–0		3–0
8	(Mato Grosso) Sinop	14	2	1	11	9	27	−18	7		1–2	0–2	0–0	0–2	1–0	2–3	1–2	

Source: CBF
Legend: Blue = home team win; Yellow = draw; Red = away team win.
Rules for classification: 1) points; 2) wins; 3) goal difference; 4) goals scored; 5) head-to-head results (only between 2 teams); 6) fewest red cards; 7) fewest yellow cards; 8) draw.

=== Group A3 ===
Pos	Team	Pld	W	D	L	GF	GA	GD	Pts	Qualification	AME	SAL	FLO	GLO	ATL	CAM	AFO	GUA
1	(Rio Grande do Norte) América de Natal	14	8	4	2	24	8	+16	28	Advance to round of 32		0–1	2–1	0–0	4–1	0–0	3–1	3–0
2	(Pernambuco) Salgueiro	14	7	5	2	18	8	+10	26	Advance to round of 32	1–0		0–1	0–0	1–0	2–0	3–1	2–0
3	(Ceará) Floresta	14	6	6	2	22	13	+9	24	Advance to round of 32	1–1	2–2		2–0	1–0	2–1	5–1	1–1
4	(Rio Grande do Norte) Globo	14	4	6	4	16	17	−1	18	Advance to round of 32	0–2	1–1	1–1		3–0	1–1	2–1	3–1
5	(Paraíba) Atlético Cajazeirense	14	5	1	8	17	21	−4	16		1–2	2–1	2–2	1–2		3–0	2–0	1–0
6	(Paraíba) Campinense	14	3	6	5	13	15	−2	15		0–0	0–0	1–1	4–1	2–1		2–0	1–1
7	(Pernambuco) Afogados	14	4	1	9	15	33	−18	13		0–4	0–3	1–0	3–2	3–2	2–1		2–2
8	(Ceará) Guarany de Sobral	14	2	5	7	10	20	−10	11		1–3	1–1	0–2	0–0	0–1	1–0	2–0	

Source: CBF
Legend: Blue = home team win; Yellow = draw; Red = away team win.
Rules for classification: 1) points; 2) wins; 3) goal difference; 4) goals scored; 5) head-to-head results (only between 2 teams); 6) fewest red cards; 7) fewest yellow cards; 8) draw.

=== Group A4 ===
Pos	Team	Pld	W	D	L	GF	GA	GD	Pts	Qualification	ABC	ITA	VIT	COR	CEN	POT	FRE	JAC
1	(Rio Grande do Norte) ABC	14	7	5	2	25	6	+19	26	Advance to round of 32		2–0	1–3	0–0	0–0	3–1	1–0	7–0
2	(Sergipe) Itabaiana	14	6	5	3	29	19	+10	23	Advance to round of 32	1–1		3–2	2–0	2–1	4–1	1–1	7–0
3	(Bahia) Vitória da Conquista	14	6	4	4	24	21	+3	22	Advance to round of 32	0–3	2–1		2–0	1–1	2–4	3–0	3–3
4	(Alagoas) Coruripe	14	6	3	5	13	17	−4	21	Advance to round of 32	1–0	2–0	1–0		0–2	1–0	1–0	3–1
5	(Pernambuco) Central	14	4	9	1	19	10	+9	21		0–0	2–2	1–1	4–0		2–2	1–0	3–0
6	(Rio Grande do Norte) Potiguar de Mossoró	14	4	7	3	27	24	+3	19		0–0	2–2	1–1	5–3	0–0		0–0	3–2
7	(Sergipe) Freipaulistano	14	2	5	7	12	15	−3	11		0–1	1–2	0–1	1–1	0–0	1–1		3–0
8	(Alagoas) Jaciobá	14	0	4	10	17	54	−37	4		0–6	2–2	2–3	0–0	2–2	3–7	2–5	

Source: CBF
Legend: Blue = home team win; Yellow = draw; Red = away team win.
Rules for classification: 1) points; 2) wins; 3) goal difference; 4) goals scored; 5) head-to-head results (only between 2 teams); 6) fewest red cards; 7) fewest yellow cards; 8) draw.

=== Group A5 ===
Pos	Team	Pld	W	D	L	GF	GA	GD	Pts	Qualification	APA	GOI	GEC	REA	AGU	VIT	CEO	UNI
1	(Goiás) Aparecidense	14	8	4	2	31	14	+17	28	Advance to round of 32		1–1	1–1	2–1	4–0	4–2	1–2	4–0
2	(Goiás) Goiânia	14	8	4	2	22	12	+10	28	Advance to round of 32	2–1		0–1	1–0	4–0	1–0	2–1	3–1
3	(Goiás) Goianésia	14	6	4	4	20	16	+4	22	Advance to round of 32	1–1	1–1		1–1	2–3	2–0	2–0	2–1
4	(Espírito Santo) Real Noroeste	14	5	4	5	20	18	+2	19	Advance to round of 32	0–0	2–1	4–1		3–1	3–2	1–2	2–1
5	(Mato Grosso do Sul) Águia Negra	14	5	4	5	20	26	−6	19		0–1	1–1	3–1	2–2		2–1	3–1	4–3
6	(Espírito Santo) Vitória	14	5	1	8	18	22	−4	16		0–1	1–2	1–0	1–1	3–1		2–1	3–0
7	(Mato Grosso) CEOV	14	3	3	8	13	24	−11	12		2–6	1–1	0–2	1–0	0–0	0–1		2–2
8	(Mato Grosso) União Rondonópolis	14	3	2	9	18	30	−12	11		2–4	1–2	0–3	2–0	0–0	4–1	1–0	

Source: CBF
Legend: Blue = home team win; Yellow = draw; Red = away team win.
Rules for classification: 1) points; 2) wins; 3) goal difference; 4) goals scored; 5) head-to-head results (only between 2 teams); 6) fewest red cards; 7) fewest yellow cards; 8) draw.

=== Group A6 ===
Pos	Team	Pld	W	D	L	GF	GA	GD	Pts	Qualification	BRA	GAM	ATL	TUP	BAH	CAL	VIL	PAL
1	(Federal District (Brazil)) Brasiliense	14	10	3	1	32	10	+22	33	Advance to round of 32		3–0	1–1	2–1	1–1	3–1	1–0	5–0
2	(Federal District (Brazil)) Gama	14	10	2	2	29	10	+19	32	Advance to round of 32	2–1		2–1	1–3	3–0	5–0	3–0	6–1
3	(Bahia) Atlético de Alagoinhas	14	7	3	4	26	16	+10	24	Advance to round of 32	0–3	0–1		1–1	3–1	1–0	5–0	3–0
4	(Minas Gerais) Tupynambás	14	6	5	3	19	16	+3	23	Advance to round of 32	1–4	1–1	1–2		2–1	0–0	1–1	1–0
5	Bahia de Feira	14	5	3	6	20	16	+4	18		1–1	0–1	3–3	0–1		3–0	2–0	5–0
6	(Minas Gerais) Caldense	14	4	3	7	10	21	−11	15		1–2	0–0	0–3	1–2	1–0		1–0	2–0
7	(Minas Gerais) Villa Nova	14	3	3	8	11	23	−12	12		1–2	0–1	2–1	2–2	0–2	1–1		3–1
8	(Tocantins) Palmas	14	0	0	14	4	39	−35	0		0–3	0–3	1–2	0–2	0–1	1–2	0–1	

Source: CBF
Legend: Blue = home team win; Yellow = draw; Red = away team win.
Rules for classification: 1) points; 2) wins; 3) goal difference; 4) goals scored; 5) head-to-head results (only between 2 teams); 6) fewest red cards; 7) fewest yellow cards; 8) draw.

=== Group A7 ===
Pos	Team	Pld	W	D	L	GF	GA	GD	Pts	Qualification	FER	MIR	CAB	CAS	POR	BAN	NAC	TOL
1	(São Paulo (state)) Ferroviária	14	9	3	2	30	10	+20	30	Advance to round of 32		1–0	3–1	0–0	1–1	3–0	2–0	5–1
2	(São Paulo (state)) Mirassol	14	7	5	2	31	9	+22	26	Advance to round of 32	1–0		2–0	5–2	1–0	1–1	8–0	6–0
3	(Rio de Janeiro (state)) Cabofriense	14	7	4	3	26	16	+10	25	Advance to round of 32	1–0	3–1		0–1	0–0	2–1	7–0	1–0
4	(Paraná (state)) FC Cascavel	14	7	3	4	24	16	+8	24	Advance to round of 32	1–2	0–0	3–3		2–0	3–0	2–0	3–1
5	(Rio de Janeiro (state)) Portuguesa	14	6	5	3	21	11	+10	23		0–0	1–1	2–2	2–1		0–2	3–1	3–0
6	(Rio de Janeiro (state)) Bangu	14	4	5	5	13	19	−6	17		1–3	0–0	2–2	2–0	0–3		0–0	1–0
7	(Paraná (state)) Nacional-PR	14	1	2	11	9	45	−36	5		1–4	1–1	1–2	0–3	0–5	1–2		1–4
8	(Paraná (state)) Toledo	14	1	1	12	12	40	−28	4		2–6	0–4	0–2	1–3	0–1	1–1	2–3	

Source: CBF
Legend: Blue = home team win; Yellow = draw; Red = away team win.
Rules for classification: 1) points; 2) wins; 3) goal difference; 4) goals scored; 5) head-to-head results (only between 2 teams); 6) fewest red cards; 7) fewest yellow cards; 8) draw.

=== Group A8 ===
Pos	Team	Pld	W	D	L	GF	GA	GD	Pts	Qualification	NOV	SLU	CAX	MAR	PEL	JOI	TUB	SCA
1	(São Paulo (state)) Novorizontino	14	9	4	1	17	7	+10	31	Advance to round of 32		1–0	1–1	1–0	1–0	0–0	1–0	2–0
2	(Rio Grande do Sul) São Luiz	14	6	5	3	16	10	+6	23	Advance to round of 32	1–2		0–0	1–1	0–0	2–1	3–0	0–0
3	(Rio Grande do Sul) Caxias	14	5	6	3	18	11	+7	21	Advance to round of 32	0–1	1–2		2–2	0–0	1–0	2–1	6–0
4	(Santa Catarina (state)) Marcílio Dias	14	5	6	3	14	8	+6	21	Advance to round of 32	0–0	1–1	1–0		1–0	0–0	3–0	3–0^{[1]}
5	(Rio Grande do Sul) Pelotas	14	5	5	4	21	11	+10	20		4–3	1–2	1–2	1–0		1–0	1–1	3–1
6	(Santa Catarina (state)) Joinville	14	5	5	4	17	11	+6	20		1–1	2–0	1–1	2–1	0–0		6–1	2–1
7	(Santa Catarina (state)) Tubarão	14	1	4	9	8	23	−15	7		0–2	0–1	1–1	0–1	0–0	0–1		3–0
8	(São Paulo (state)) São Caetano	14	1	3	10	5	35	−30	6		0–1	0–3	0–1	0–0	0–9	2–1	1–1	

Source: CBF
Legend: Blue = home team win; Yellow = draw; Red = away team win.
Rules for classification: 1) points; 2) wins; 3) goal difference; 4) goals scored; 5) head-to-head results (only between 2 teams); 6) fewest red cards; 7) fewest yellow cards; 8) draw.

^{1} Marcílio Dias awarded 3–0 win by forfeit.

== Final stages ==
The final stages were played on a home-and-away two-legged basis. For the round of 16, semi-finals and finals, the best-overall-performance team hosted the second leg. If tied on aggregate, the away goals rule would not be used, extra time would not be played, and the penalty shoot-out would be used to determine the winners (Regulations Article 18).

For the quarter-finals, teams were seeded based on the table of results of all matches in the competition. The top four seeded teams played the second leg at home.

The four quarter-final winners were promoted to 2021 Série C.

=== Round of 32 ===
The round of 32 was a two-legged knockout tie, with the draw regionalised. The matches were played from 5 to 13 December 2020.

==== Matches ====
Team 1	Agg.	Team 2	1st leg	2nd leg
Juventude Samas (Maranhão)	2–2 (4–3 p)	(Pará) Bragantino	1–1	1–1
Galvez (Acre (state))	1–0	(Piauí) River	0–0	1–0
Rio Branco (Acre (state))	1–5	(Piauí) Altos	0–2	1–3
Moto Club (Maranhão)	3–3 (5–6 p)	(Amazonas (Brazilian state)) Fast Clube	2–2	1–1
Coruripe (Alagoas)	1–5	(Rio Grande do Norte) América de Natal	1–0	0–5
Floresta (Ceará)	4–3	(Sergipe) Itabaiana	2–1	2–2
Globo (Rio Grande do Norte)	3–2	(Rio Grande do Norte) ABC	2–1	1–1
Vitória da Conquista (Bahia)	4–7	(Pernambuco) Salgueiro	4–3	0–4
Tupynambás (Minas Gerais)	1–5	(Goiás) Aparecidense	1–1	0–4
Goianésia (Goiás)	4–3	(Federal District (Brazil)) Gama	2–2	2–1
Real Noroeste (Espírito Santo)	1–4	(Federal District (Brazil)) Brasiliense	1–1	0–3
Atlético de Alagoinhas (Bahia)	3–4	(Goiás) Goiânia	1–1	2–3
Marcílio Dias (Santa Catarina (state))	2–1	(São Paulo (state)) Ferroviária	0–0	2–1
Cabofriense (Rio de Janeiro (state))	1–3	(Rio Grande do Sul) São Luiz	1–1	0–2
FC Cascavel (Paraná (state))	1–3	(São Paulo (state)) Novorizontino	1–0	0–3
Caxias (Rio Grande do Sul)	1–1 (0–3 p)	(São Paulo (state)) Mirassol	1–0	0–1

=== Round of 16 ===
The matches were played from 19 to 27 December 2020.

==== Matches ====
Team 1	Agg.	Team 2	1st leg	2nd leg
Juventude Samas (Maranhão)	2–4	(Ceará) Floresta	2–2	0–2
Galvez (Acre (state))	2–6	(Rio Grande do Norte) América de Natal	1–1	1–5
Salgueiro (Pernambuco)	2–2 (2–4 p)	(Piauí) Altos	1–1	1–1
Globo (Rio Grande do Norte)	2–2 (5–6 p)	(Amazonas (Brazilian state)) Fast Clube	2–1	0–1
São Luiz (Rio Grande do Sul)	2–5	(Goiás) Aparecidense	0–4	2–1
Marcílio Dias (Santa Catarina (state))	3–2	(Goiás) Goianésia	2–1	1–1
Mirassol (São Paulo (state))	5–2	(Federal District (Brazil)) Brasiliense	4–0	1–2
Goiânia (Goiás)	1–5	(São Paulo (state)) Novorizontino	1–1	0–4

=== Quarter-finals ===
The draw for the quarter-finals was seeded based on the table of results of all matches in the competition (except preliminary stage matches) for the qualifying teams. The teams were ranked according to points. If tied on points, the following criteria would be used to determine the ranking: 1. Wins; 2. Goal difference; 3. Draw in the headquarters of the Brazilian Football Confederation (Regulations Article 15).

==== Quarter-finals seedings ====
Seed	Team	Pts	W	GD
1	(Piauí) Altos	38	12	+15
2	(São Paulo (state)) Novorizontino	38	11	+16
3	(Rio Grande do Norte) América de Natal	35	10	+24
4	(Goiás) Aparecidense	35	10	+24
5	(São Paulo (state)) Mirassol	32	9	+25
6	(Ceará) Floresta	32	8	+12
7	(Amazonas (Brazilian state)) Fast Clube	31	8	+13
8	(Santa Catarina (state)) Marcílio Dias	29	7	+8

Seed 3 and seed 4 were decided by a draw held on 28 December 2020, 11:00 at CBF headquarters in Rio de Janeiro.

==== Matches ====
The matches were played from 2 to 10 January 2021.

Team 1	Agg.	Team 2	1st leg	2nd leg
Marcílio Dias (Santa Catarina (state))	2–6	(Piauí) Altos	1–1	1–5
Mirassol (São Paulo (state))	5–3	(Goiás) Aparecidense	2–1	3–2
Fast Clube (Amazonas (Brazilian state))	0–4	(São Paulo (state)) Novorizontino	0–1	0–3
Floresta (Ceará)	3–1	(Rio Grande do Norte) América de Natal	2–0	1–1

=== Semi-finals ===
The matches were played from 16 to 24 January 2021.

==== Matches ====
Team 1	Agg.	Team 2	1st leg	2nd leg
Mirassol (São Paulo (state))	5–0	(Piauí) Altos	4–0	1–0
Floresta (Ceará)	3–1	(São Paulo (state)) Novorizontino	1–1	2–0

=== Finals ===
The matches were played on 30 January and 6 February 2021.

==== Matches ====
Team 1	Agg.	Team 2	1st leg	2nd leg
Floresta (Ceará)	0–2	(São Paulo (state)) Mirassol	0–1	0–1

30 January 2021
16:00

Floresta (Ceará)	0–1	(São Paulo (state)) Mirassol
	Report	Netto 63'

Estádio Carlos de Alencar Pinto, Fortaleza
Attendance: 0
Referee: Jefferson Ferreira de Moraes (Goiás)

6 February 2021
16:00

Mirassol (São Paulo (state))	1–0	(Ceará) Floresta
João Carlos 18'	Report

Estádio José Maria de Campos Maia, Mirassol
Attendance: 0
Referee: Vinícius Gomes do Amaral (Rio Grande do Sul)

== Top goalscorers ==
Rank	Player	Team	Goals
1	Wallace Pernambucano	(Rio Grande do Norte) América de Natal	12
1	Zé Love	(Federal District (Brazil)) Brasiliense	12
3	Fabrício Daniel	(São Paulo (state)) Mirassol	11
3	Tiago Marques	(São Paulo (state)) Ferroviária	11
5	Alex Henrique	(Goiás) Aparecidense	10
5	Fabinho Alves	(Minas Gerais) Tupynambás	10
5	Thiago Santos	(Sergipe) Itabaiana	10
8	Adriano	(Rio de Janeiro (state)) Portuguesa	9
8	Betinho	(Piauí) Altos	9
8	Gustavo Coutinho	(Rio de Janeiro (state)) Cabofriense	9
8	Luquinhas	(Federal District (Brazil)) Brasiliense	9

Source: CBF
