= Vina (footballer) =

Brazilian footballer (born 1991)

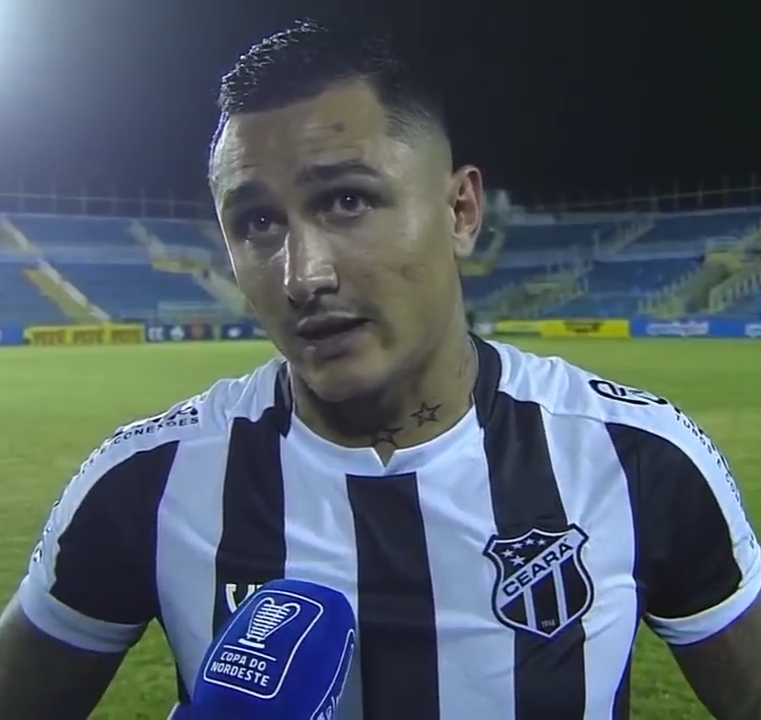
- Vina with Ceará in 2020

Personal information
- Full name: Vinícius Goes Barbosa de Souza
- Date of birth: 15 April 1991 (age 35)
- Place of birth: Curitiba, Brazil
- Height: 1.77 m (5 ft 9 1/2 in)
- Position: Attacking midfielder

Team information
- Current team: Ceará
- Number: 29

Youth career
- Paraná
- 2011–2012: Coritiba

Senior career*
Years	Team	Apps	(Gls)
2009–2010	Paraná	18	(1)
2011–2013	Coritiba	9	(0)
2012	→ Joinville (loan)	0	(0)
2013	→ Londrina (loan)	5	(0)
2013	→ Tupi (loan)	9	(2)
2014	Esportivo	6	(1)
2014	Anápolis	6	(3)
2014	Náutico	37	(6)
2015	Fluminense	36	(4)
2016–2018	Atlético Paranaense	27	(4)
2016	→ Náutico (loan)	16	(5)
2017–2018	→ Bahia (loan)	67	(13)
2019	Atlético Mineiro	29	(4)
2020–2024	Ceará	138	(34)
2023	→ Grêmio (loan)	21	(4)
2023–2025	Al-Hazem	22	(2)
2024–2025	Al-Jubail	29	(16)
2025–	Ceará	45	(9)
- * Club domestic league appearances and goals as of 18 November 2026

Vinícius Goes Barbosa de Souza (born 15 April 1991), known as Vinícius or just Vina, is a Brazilian footballer who plays as an attacking midfielder for Ceará.

== Club career ==
=== Paraná ===
Born in Curitiba, Paraná, Vina graduated with Paraná in 2010. He made his professional debut on 20 July of that year, coming on as a second-half substitute in a 0–3 away loss against Brasiliense.

Vina scored his first professional goal on 31 July 2010, netting Paraná's third in a 4–0 home routing of Náutico.

=== Coritiba ===
On 30 November 2010, Vina moved to cross-town rivals Coritiba, initially assigned to the under-20s. He made his Série A debut on 26 May 2012, coming on as a late substitute in a 2–3 home loss against Botafogo.

==== Loan deals ====
Vina was subsequently loaned to Joinville on 29 June 2012, but returned to Coritiba on 9 August. On 7 January 2013, he moved to Londrina also in a temporary deal, but was dismissed in February after an indiscipline problem.

On 18 February 2013, Vina was loaned to Tupi. He left Coxa in November 2013, with his contract expiring in the following month.

=== Esportivo and Anápolis ===
Vina joined Esportivo Bento Gonçalves ahead of the 2014 season, but signed for Anápolis on 17 February of that year. He only played in six matches for each club, before leaving.

=== Náutico ===
On 20 March 2014, Vina moved to Série B side Náutico. Mainly a substitute, he featured in 33 league matches and scored five goals as his side avoided relegation, but refused a contract renewal in December.

=== Fluminense ===
On 23 December 2014, Vina joined Fluminense after agreeing to a one-year deal. On his top level debut for the club, he scored the winner in a home success against his former club Joinville.

Despite becoming a starter, Vina suffered a foot fracture in June 2015 which kept him out for two months. In November, he was separated from the first team squad after failing to agree a contract renewal, and left Flu in December; he also had altercations with his representative at the time.

=== Atlético Paranaense ===
On 18 December 2015, Vina moved to fellow first division side Atlético Paranaense. Initially a starter during the Campeonato Paranaense, he fell down the pecking order before being loaned to Náutico in August.

==== Loan to Bahia ====
On 29 May 2017, after spending the first five months of the season separated from Atlético's first team squad, Vinícius joined Bahia still in the top tier, signing until December 2018. He was a regular starter at the club, but his spell was mainly linked to a match against rivals Vitória, where he supposedly celebrated a goal in front of Vitória's supporters, which led to a widespread confusion and nine players being sent off from the match, himself included;

=== Atlético Mineiro ===
On 11 January 2019, Vina agreed to a two-year deal with Atlético Mineiro. He featured sparingly and ended the campaign as a backup option.

=== Ceará ===
Vina moved to Ceará on a two-year contract on 9 January 2020. He changed his nicknamed throughout the season, being called Vina and becoming a key unit for the club, and scored a career-best 23 goals overall during the 2020 season.

On 17 February 2021, Vina renewed his contract until December 2024. He lost his starting spot under Guto Ferreira during a period of the 2021 campaign, but still ended the season as a starter after regaining his starting spot in August.

In 2022, Vina's form decreased, and he ended the season with more bookable offences (16 yellow cards, two ejections) than goals (12). In October of that year, he was fined after receiving two yellow cards (and being sent off) within three minutes in a 1–1 home draw against Goiás. Ceará also suffered top tier relegation.

=== Al-Hazem ===
On 28 July 2023, Vina joined Saudi Professional League club Al-Hazem.

== Career statistics ==
As of 29 January 2024

Club	Season	League			State League		Cup		Continental		Other		Total	
Club	Season	Division	Apps	Goals	Apps	Goals	Apps	Goals	Apps	Goals	Apps	Goals	Apps	Goals
Paraná	2009	Série B	0	0	2	0	—		—		—		2	0
Paraná	2010	Série B	5	1	11	0	1	0	—		—		17	1
Paraná	Total		5	1	13	0	1	0	—		—		19	1
Coritiba	2012	Série A	4	0	1	0	1	0	—		—		6	0
Coritiba	2013	Série A	4	0	—		—		1 (Note: Appearance(s) in Copa Sudamericana)	0	—		5	0
Coritiba	Total		8	0	1	0	1	0	1	0	—		11	0
Londrina (loan)	2013	Série D	0	0	5	0	—		—		—		5	0
Tupi (loan)	2013	Série D	0	0	9	2	2	0	—		—		11	2
Esportivo	2014	Gaúcho	—		6	1	—		—		—		6	1
Anápolis	2014	Goiano	—		6	3	—		—		—		6	3
Náutico	2014	Série B	33	5	4	1	3	0	—		—		40	6
Fluminense	2015	Série A	20	3	16	1	3	0	—		—		39	4
Atlético Paranaense	2016	Série A	15	1	12	3	4	1	—		3 (Note: Appearance(s) in Primeira Liga)	1	34	6
Náutico (loan)	2016	Série B	16	5	—		—		—		—		16	5
Bahia	2017	Série A	27	3	—		—		—		—		27	3
Bahia	2018	Série A	29	4	11	6	4	1	6	0	10 (Note: Appearance(s) in Copa do Nordeste)	2	60	13
Bahia	Total		56	7	11	6	4	1	6	0	10	2	87	16
Atlético Mineiro	2019	Série A	24	2	5	2	0	0	12 (Note: Five appearances and one goal in Copa Libertadores, seven appearances and two goals in Copa Sudamericana)	3	—		41	7
Ceará	2020	Série A	31	13	8	1	9	4	—		11	5	59	23
Ceará	2021	Série A	34	8	1	0	2	0	5	2	9	1	51	11
Ceará	2022	Série A	31	3	2	0	5	4	9	2	8	3	55	12
Ceará	2023	Série B	0	0	2	0	0	0	—		1	0	3	0
Ceará	Total		96	24	13	1	16	8	14	4	29	9	168	46
Grêmio	2023	Série A	14	1	7	3	0	0	12	3	—		41	7
Career total			273	48	101	20	34	10	33	7	42	12	483	97

== Honours ==
Coritiba

- Campeonato Paranaense: 2012

Atlético Paranaense

- Campeonato Paranaense: 2016

Bahia

- Campeonato Baiano: 2018

Ceará

- Copa do Nordeste: 2020 e 2023

Grêmio

- Campeonato Gaúcho: 2023
