= 2020 Copa do Nordeste =

Tournament details
- Country: Brazil
- Dates: 21 January – 4 August
- Teams: 16

Final positions
- Champions: Ceará
- Runners-up: Bahia
- 2021 Copa do Brasil: Ceará

Tournament statistics
- Matches played: 71
- Goals scored: 166 (2.34 per match)
- Top goal scorer: Vinícius (5 goals)

Awards
- Best player: Vinícius

The 2020 Copa do Nordeste was the 17th edition of the main football tournament featuring teams from the Brazilian Northeast Region. The competition featured 16 clubs, with Bahia, Ceará and Pernambuco having two seeds each, and Rio Grande do Norte, Sergipe, Alagoas, Paraíba, Maranhão and Piauí with one seed each. Four teams were decided by a qualifying tournament (Pré-Copa do Nordeste). The tournament began on 21 January and ended on 4 August.

Due to the coronavirus pandemic in Brazil, CBF suspended the Copa do Nordeste indefinitely on 17 March 2020. On 7 July 2020, CBF announced that the Copa do Nordeste would be resumed behind closed doors on 21 July 2020. The last round of the group stage, quarter-finals, semi-finals, and finals were played in Salvador, Feira de Santana, Riachão do Jacuípe, and Mata de São João. All the chosen venues are in the state of Bahia.

Ceará defeated Bahia 4–1 on aggregate in the finals to win their second title. As champions, Ceará originally qualified for the Round of 16 of the 2021 Copa do Brasil, however CBF changed the Copa do Brasil format and Ceará qualified for the 2021 Copa do Brasil third round.

Fortaleza were the defending champions, but were eliminated in the semi-finals.

== Format ==
In this season, 12 teams (9 state league champions and best placed teams in the 2019 CBF ranking from Bahia, Ceará and Pernambuco) gained direct entries into the group stage while the other four berths were decided by the Pré-Copa do Nordeste.

For the group stage, the 16 teams were drawn into two groups. Each team played once against the eight clubs from the other group. Top four teams qualified for the final stages. Quarter-finals and semi-finals were played on a single-leg basis and finals were played on a home-and-away two-legged basis.

== Teams ==
=== 2020 Pré-Copa do Nordeste ===
The 2020 Pré-Copa do Nordeste was the qualifying tournament of 2020 Copa do Nordeste. It was played from 1 to 15 May 2019. Best placed team in the 2019 CBF ranking not already qualified from Alagoas, Bahia, Maranhão, Paraíba, Pernambuco, Piauí, Rio Grande do Norte and Sergipe competed to decide four places in the Copa do Nordeste.

==== Draw ====
The draw was held on 24 April 2019, 16:00, at the CBF headquarters in Rio de Janeiro. Teams were seeded by their 2019 CBF ranking (shown in parentheses). The eight teams were drawn into four ties, with the Pot A teams hosting the second leg.

2020 Pré-Copa do Nordeste draw
Pot A	Pot B
(Alagoas) CRB (32); (Pernambuco) Náutico (36); (Maranhão) Sampaio Corrêa (38); (Rio Grande do Norte) ABC^{[1]} (43)	(Sergipe) Confiança (53); (Bahia) Juazeirense (67); (Paraíba) Campinense (69); (Piauí) Altos (76)

^{1} The identity of Rio Grande do Norte team was not known at the time of the draw.

Each tie was played on a home-and-away two-legged basis. If tied on aggregate, the away goals rule would not be used, extra time would not be played, and the penalty shoot-out would be used to determine the winner (Regulations Pré-Copa do Nordeste Article 8).

==== Matches ====
Team 1	Agg.	Team 2	1st leg	2nd leg
Campinense (Paraíba)	2–3	(Pernambuco) Náutico	2–1	0–2
Confiança (Sergipe)	2–0	(Maranhão) Sampaio Corrêa	0–0	2–0
Juazeirense (Bahia)	1–2	(Alagoas) CRB	0–0	1–2
Altos (Piauí)	1–2	(Rio Grande do Norte) ABC	1–0	0–2

Náutico, Confiança, CRB and ABC qualified for 2020 Copa do Nordeste.

=== Qualified teams ===
Association	Team	Qualification method
(Alagoas) Alagoas; 1 + 1 berths	CSA	2019 Campeonato Alagoano champions
(Alagoas) Alagoas; 1 + 1 berths	CRB	2020 Pré-Copa do Nordeste
(Bahia) Bahia; 2 berths	Bahia	2019 Campeonato Baiano champions
(Bahia) Bahia; 2 berths	Vitória	best placed team in the 2019 CBF ranking not already qualified
(Ceará) Ceará; 2 berths	Fortaleza	2019 Campeonato Cearense champions
(Ceará) Ceará; 2 berths	Ceará	best placed team in the 2019 CBF ranking not already qualified
(Maranhão) Maranhão; 1 berth	Imperatriz	2019 Campeonato Maranhense champions
(Paraíba) Paraíba; 1 berth	Botafogo-PB	2019 Campeonato Paraibano champions
(Pernambuco) Pernambuco; 2 + 1 berths	Sport	2019 Campeonato Pernambucano champions
(Pernambuco) Pernambuco; 2 + 1 berths	Santa Cruz	best placed team in the 2019 CBF ranking not already qualified
(Pernambuco) Pernambuco; 2 + 1 berths	Náutico	2020 Pré-Copa do Nordeste
(Piauí) Piauí; 1 berth	Ríver	2019 Campeonato Piauiense champions
(Rio Grande do Norte) Rio Grande do Norte; 1 + 1 berths	América de Natal	2019 Campeonato Potiguar champions
(Rio Grande do Norte) Rio Grande do Norte; 1 + 1 berths	ABC	2020 Pré-Copa do Nordeste
(Sergipe) Sergipe; 1 + 1 berths	Freipaulistano	2019 Campeonato Sergipano champions
(Sergipe) Sergipe; 1 + 1 berths	Confiança	2020 Pré-Copa do Nordeste

== Schedule ==
The schedule of the competition was as follows.

Stage	First leg	Second leg
Group Stage	Round 1: 21, 23 and 25–26 January	
Group Stage	Round 2: 28–29 January and 1–2 February	
Group Stage	Round 3: 6 and 8–9 February	
Group Stage	Round 4: 13 and 15–17 February	
Group Stage	Round 5: 19, 22 and 26–27 February	
Group Stage	Round 6: 3–4 and 7–8 March	
Group Stage	Round 7: 12 and 14–15 March	
Group Stage	Round 8: 21 and 22 July	
Quarter-finals	25 July	
Semi-finals	28 and 29 July	
Finals	1 August	4 August

== Draw ==
The draw for the group stage was held on 26 September 2019, 19:30, at Mansion Eventos in Aracaju. The 16 teams were drawn into two groups of eight containing two teams from each of the four pots with the restriction that teams from the same federation (except Náutico) could not be drawn into the same group. Teams were seeded by their 2019 CBF ranking (shown in parentheses).

Group stage draw
Pot 1	Pot 2	Pot 3	Pot 4
Bahia (15); (Pernambuco) Sport (16); (Bahia) Vitória (17); Ceará (23)	(Pernambuco) Santa Cruz (28); (Alagoas) CRB (32); (Ceará) Fortaleza (33); (Pernambuco) Náutico (36)	(Rio Grande do Norte) ABC (43); (Alagoas) CSA (45); (Paraíba) Botafogo-PB (46); (Rio Grande do Norte) América de Natal (49)	(Sergipe) Confiança (53); (Piauí) Ríver (72); (Maranhão) Imperatriz (111); (Sergipe) Freipaulistano (no rank)

A second draw to determine the home-and-away teams for matches between same-state clubs was held on 25 October 2019 at CBF headquarters in Rio de Janeiro.

== Group stage ==
For the group stage, the 16 teams were drawn into two groups of eight teams each. Each team played on a single round-robin tournament against the eight clubs from the other group. The top four teams of each group advanced to the quarter-finals of the knockout stages. The teams were ranked according to points (3 points for a win, 1 point for a draw, and 0 points for a loss). If tied on points, the following criteria would be used to determine the ranking: 1. Wins; 2. Goal difference; 3. Goals scored; 4. Fewest red cards; 5. Fewest yellow cards; 6. Draw in the headquarters of the Brazilian Football Confederation (Regulations Article 12).

=== Group A ===
Pos	Team	Pld	W	D	L	GF	GA	GD	Pts	Qualification
1	(Ceará) Fortaleza	8	5	2	1	13	5	+8	17 (Note: Fewest red cards: Fortaleza 1, Bahia 2)	Advance to Quarter-finals
2	Bahia	8	5	2	1	13	5	+8	17	Advance to Quarter-finals
3	(Paraíba) Botafogo-PB	8	3	4	1	9	9	0	13	Advance to Quarter-finals
4	(Pernambuco) Sport	8	2	4	2	8	9	−1	10	Advance to Quarter-finals
5	(Rio Grande do Norte) ABC	8	2	3	3	8	10	−2	9	
6	(Alagoas) CRB	8	2	2	4	9	11	−2	8	
7	(Sergipe) Freipaulistano	7	1	2	4	6	15	−9	5	
8	(Piauí) Ríver	8	1	1	6	7	17	−10	4	

Source: CBF

=== Group B ===
Pos	Team	Pld	W	D	L	GF	GA	GD	Pts	Qualification
1	(Sergipe) Confiança	8	4	2	2	11	6	+5	14	Advance to Quarter-finals
2	Ceará	8	3	5	0	15	9	+6	14	Advance to Quarter-finals
3	(Bahia) Vitória	8	3	5	0	11	5	+6	14	Advance to Quarter-finals
4	(Pernambuco) Santa Cruz	8	4	1	3	8	6	+2	13	Advance to Quarter-finals
5	(Pernambuco) Náutico	8	3	2	3	11	13	−2	11	
6	(Alagoas) CSA	8	2	1	5	8	9	−1	7	
7	(Maranhão) Imperatriz	7	2	1	4	10	13	−3	7	
8	(Rio Grande do Norte) América de Natal	8	1	3	4	7	12	−5	6	

Source: CBF

=== Results ===
Home \ Away	AME	CEA	CON	CSA	IMP	NAU	SAN	VIT
(Rio Grande do Norte) ABC	2–1	0–0		0–2				1–1
Bahia			1–0		2–0	4–1		0–2
(Paraíba) Botafogo-PB			1–1		2–1	2–1		1–1
(Alagoas) CRB		1–2		1–1		2–3	1–0	
(Ceará) Fortaleza	3–1	1–1		1–0			3–0	
(Sergipe) Freipaulistano	1–0		2–4		^{[a]}	0–2		
(Piauí) Ríver	2–3	0–4		3–1			0–1	
(Pernambuco) Sport			1–1		2–2		1–0	1–1

Home \ Away	ABC	BAH	BOT	CRB	FOR	FRE	RIV	SPO
(Rio Grande do Norte) América de Natal		0–2	0–0	1–1				1–1
Ceará		2–2	2–2			2–2		2–1
(Sergipe) Confiança	1–0			0–1	2–0		2–0	
(Alagoas) CSA		0–2	0–1			4–0		0–1
(Maranhão) Imperatriz	3–4			2–1	1–2		1–0	
(Pernambuco) Náutico	1–1				0–3		1–1	2–0
(Pernambuco) Santa Cruz	1–0	0–0	3–0			3–1		
(Bahia) Vitória				2–1	0–0	0–0	4–1	

Source:CBF
Legend: Blue = home team win; Yellow = draw; Red = away team win.

^{a} CBF cancelled the match between Freipaulistano and Imperatriz because both teams had no chances of qualifying.

== Final stages ==
Starting from the quarter-finals, the teams played a single-elimination tournament with the following rules:

- Quarter-finals and semi-finals were played on a single-leg basis, with the higher-seeded team hosting the leg.
  - If tied, the penalty shoot-out would be used to determine the winner (Regulations Article 10).
- Finals were played on a home-and-away two-legged basis, with the higher-seeded team hosting the second leg.
  - If tied on aggregate, the penalty shoot-out would be used to determine the winner (Regulations Article 16).
- Extra time would not be played and away goals rule would not be used in final stages.

Starting from the semi-finals, the teams were seeded according to their performance in the tournament. The teams were ranked according to overall points. If tied on overall points, the following criteria would be used to determine the ranking: 1. Overall wins; 2. Overall goal difference; 3. Draw in the headquarters of the Brazilian Football Confederation (Regulations Article 17).

=== Bracket ===
Quarter-finals
(Ceará)	Fortaleza (p)	0 (4)
(Pernambuco)	Sport	0 (1)
(Ceará)	Ceará	1
(Bahia)	Vitória	0
(Bahia)	Bahia	3
(Paraíba)	Botafogo-PB	1
(Sergipe)	Confiança (p)	0 (4)
(Pernambuco)	Santa Cruz	0 (2)

Semi-finals
(Ceará)	Fortaleza	0
(Ceará)	Ceará	1
(Bahia)	Bahia	1
(Sergipe)	Confiança	0

Finals
(Ceará)	Ceará	3	1	4
(Bahia)	Bahia	1	0	1

=== Quarter-finals ===
Team 1	Score	Team 2
Fortaleza (Ceará)	0–0 (4–1 p)	(Pernambuco) Sport
Bahia	3–1	(Paraíba) Botafogo-PB
Confiança (Sergipe)	0–0 (4–2 p)	(Pernambuco) Santa Cruz
Ceará	1–0	(Bahia) Vitória

==== Matches ====
25 July 2020
16:00

Fortaleza (Ceará)	0–0	(Pernambuco) Sport
	Report
Penalties
Juninho (penalty scored); Bruno Melo (penalty scored); Marlon (penalty scored); Edson Cariús (penalty scored)	4–1	(penalty missed) Barcia; (penalty missed) Patric; (penalty scored) Iago Maidana

Barradão, Salvador
Attendance: 0
Referee: Diego Pombo Lopez (Bahia)

25 July 2020
21:30

Bahia	3–1	(Paraíba) Botafogo-PB
Ronaldo 12'; Rodriguinho 48'; Fernandão 70'	Report	Rodrigo Andrade 59'

Estádio de Pituaçu, Salvador
Attendance: 0
Referee: Gilberto Rodrigues Castro Júnior (Pernambuco)

25 July 2020
18:30

Confiança (Sergipe)	0–0	(Pernambuco) Santa Cruz
	Report
Penalties
Reis (penalty scored); Renan Gorne (penalty scored); Silva (penalty scored); Danilo Pires (penalty scored)	4–2	(penalty scored) Didira; (penalty missed) Pipico; (penalty scored) Toty; (penalty missed) Patrick Nonato

Estádio Joia da Princesa, Feira de Santana
Attendance: 0
Referee: Léo Simão Holanda (Ceará)

25 July 2020
16:00

Ceará	1–0	(Bahia) Vitória
Vinícius 44' (pen.)	Report

Estádio de Pituaçu, Salvador
Attendance: 0
Referee: Marcelo Aparecido Ribeiro de Souza (Paraíba)

=== Semi-finals ===
Pos	Team	Pld	W	D	L	GF	GA	GD	Pts	Host
2	(Ceará) Fortaleza	9	5	3	1	13	5	+8	18	Host
3	Ceará	9	4	5	0	16	9	+7	17	
1	Bahia	9	6	2	1	16	6	+10	20	Host
4	(Sergipe) Confiança	9	4	3	2	11	6	+5	15	

Source: CBF

Team 1	Score	Team 2
Fortaleza (Ceará)	0–1	Ceará
Bahia	1–0	(Sergipe) Confiança

==== Matches ====
28 July 2020
21:30

Fortaleza (Ceará)	0–1	Ceará
	Report	Klaus 23'

Estádio de Pituaçu, Salvador
Attendance: 0
Referee: Caio Max Augusto Vieira (Rio Grande do Norte)

29 July 2020
19:30

Bahia	1–0	(Sergipe) Confiança
Danielzinho 87'	Report

Estádio de Pituaçu, Salvador
Attendance: 0
Referee: Denis da Silva Ribeiro Serafim (Alagoas)

=== Finals ===
Pos	Team	Pld	W	D	L	GF	GA	GD	Pts	Host
1	Bahia	10	7	2	1	17	6	+11	23	2nd leg
2	Ceará	10	5	5	0	17	9	+8	20	1st leg

Source: CBF

Team 1	Agg.	Team 2	1st leg	2nd leg
Ceará	4–1	Bahia	3–1	1–0

==== Matches ====
1 August 2020
16:00

Ceará	3–1	Bahia
Fernando Sobral 27'; Cléber 57'; Mateus Gonçalves 75'	Report	Fernandão 25'

Estádio de Pituaçu, Salvador
Attendance: 0
Referee: Wagner Reway (Paraíba)

4 August 2020
21:30

Bahia	0–1	Ceará
	Report	Cléber 61'

Estádio de Pituaçu, Salvador
Attendance: 0
Referee: Caio Max Augusto Vieira (Rio Grande do Norte)

2020 Copa do Nordeste
Champions

Ceará
2nd title

== Top goalscorers ==
Rank	Player	Team	Goals
1	(Brazil) Vinícius	Ceará	5
2	(Brazil) Gilberto	Bahia	4
2	(Brazil) Rafael Longuine	(Alagoas) CRB	4
2	(Brazil) Tiago Orobó	(Rio Grande do Norte) América de Natal	4
2	(Brazil) Wellington Paulista	(Ceará) Fortaleza	4
6	(Brazil) Alisson Farias	(Bahia) Vitória	3
6	(Brazil) Cesinha	(Maranhão) Imperatriz	3
6	(Brazil) David	(Ceará) Fortaleza	3
6	(Brazil) Élber	Bahia	3
6	(Brazil) Fernandão	Bahia	3
6	(Brazil) Jean Carlos	(Pernambuco) Náutico	3
6	(Brazil) Klaus	Ceará	3
6	(Brazil) Lohan	(Paraíba) Botafogo-PB	3
6	(Brazil) Matheus João	(Maranhão) Imperatriz	3
6	(Brazil) Mikael	(Sergipe) Confiança	3
6	(Brazil) Rafael Sóbis	Ceará	3
6	(Brazil) Rodrigo Andrade	(Paraíba) Botafogo-PB	3

Source:CBF

== 2020 Copa do Nordeste team ==
The 2020 Copa do Nordeste team was a squad consisting of the eleven most impressive players at the tournament.

Pos.	Player	Team
GK	(Brazil) Fernando Prass	Ceará
DF	(Brazil) Samuel Xavier	Ceará
DF	(Brazil) Luiz Otávio	Ceará
DF	(Brazil) Klaus	Ceará
DF	(Brazil) Thiago Carleto	(Bahia) Vitória
MF	(Brazil) Charles	Ceará
MF	(Brazil) Flávio	Bahia
MF	(Brazil) Vinícius ^{a}	Ceará
MF	(Brazil) Fernando Sobral	Ceará
FW	(Brazil) Cléber	Ceará
FW	(Brazil) Alisson Farias	(Bahia) Vitória
Head coach	(Brazil) Guto Ferreira	Ceará

a. Best player and Top scorer

Head coach
(Brazil) Guto Ferreira
