= Associação Desportiva Cabense =

Brazilian football club

Cabense
- Full name: Associação Desportiva Cabense
- Nickname(s): Azulão do Cabo; Azulão Pernambucano; Azulão Cabense; Alviazulino; Dona Zula; Maior do Cabo
- Founded: November 26, 1995; 29 years ago
- Ground: Gileno de Carli
- Capacity: 5,000
- Website: https://web.archive.org/web/20111108221614/http://www.azulaocabense.com.br/
Home colors	Away colors

The Associação Desportiva Cabense is a Brazilian football club located in Cabo de Santo Agostinho, Pernambuco. Cabense currently play in the Campeonato Pernambucano Série A2.

== Stadium ==
Cabense plays their home matches at the Estádio Gileno de Carli which has a capacity of 5,000 seats.

== Current squad ==
According to the CBF register.

Note: Flags indicate national team as defined under FIFA eligibility rules; some limited exceptions apply. Players may hold more than one non-FIFA nationality.

No.	Pos.	Nation	Player
2	DF	(Brazil) BRA	Fernandes
3	DF	(Brazil) BRA	Joelcio
4		(Brazil) BRA	Coelho
5	MF	(Brazil) BRA	Dinho
6	MF	(Brazil) BRA	Luiz Carlos
7	FW	(Brazil) BRA	Renato Frota
8	MF	(Brazil) BRA	Guego
9	FW	(Brazil) BRA	Wallace
11	MF	(Brazil) BRA	Buiu
12	GK	(Brazil) BRA	Jéferson
13	DF	(Brazil) BRA	Élder
14	DF	(Brazil) BRA	Alex
16	DF	(Brazil) BRA	Oziel
17		(Brazil) BRA	Danilo Barbosa
18	FW	(Brazil) BRA	Eduardo Santana
—	GK	(Brazil) BRA	Delone

No.	Pos.	Nation	Player
—	DF	(Brazil) BRA	Fernando Belém
—	MF	(Brazil) BRA	Madson
—	MF	(Brazil) BRA	Thiago Almeida
—	MF	(Brazil) BRA	Tiago Andrade
—	MF	(Brazil) BRA	Xinho
—	FW	(Brazil) BRA	Cláudio
—	FW	(Brazil) BRA	Gílson Costa
—	FW	(Brazil) BRA	Flávio
—		(Brazil) BRA	Carlos
—		(Brazil) BRA	Gleydson
—		(Brazil) BRA	Guilherme
—		(Brazil) BRA	Hugo Diego
—		(Brazil) BRA	Luís
—		(Brazil) BRA	Peter
—		(Brazil) BRA	Ricardo
—		(Brazil) BRA	Tomas

== Performance Competitions ==
=== (Pernambuco) Campeonato Pernambucano - First Division ===
Year	Position
1996	4th
1997	5th
1998	12th (Last and Dropped)
2007	9th (Penultimate and Dropped)
2009	8th
2010	5th

=== (Pernambuco) Campeonato Pernambucano - Second Division ===
Year	Position
1999	12th (Last)
2000	8th
2001	11th
2002	12th
2003	10th
2004	16th (Penultimate)
2005	9th
2006	(Runner-up and Promoted)
2008	(Runner-up and Promoted)

=== Pernambuco Cup ===
Year	Position
2002	6th
2003	9th
2004	7th
2005	4th
2008	14th (Last)
2009	6th
