= Valentín Gómez Farías, Chihuahua =

Seat of a Municipality in the Mexican state of Chihuahua

Valentín Gómez Farías
- Town

- Location in Mexico
- Coordinates: 29°21′30″N 107°44′10″W
- Country: Mexico
- State: Chihuahua
- Municipality: Gómez Farías Municipality

Population (2010)
  - Total: 5,330

Valentín Gómez Farías is a town and seat of the Gómez Farías Municipality, in the northern Mexican state of Chihuahua. As of 2010, the town had a population of 5,330.

It is named after Valentín Gómez Farías.
