= Guto Ferreira =

Brazilian footballer & manager (born 1965)

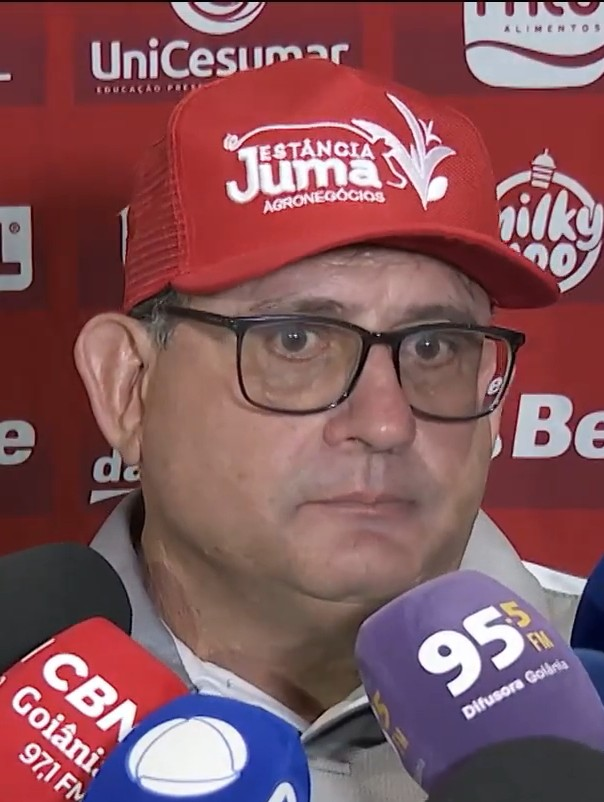
- Ferreira in 2026

Personal information
- Full name: Augusto Sérgio Ferreira
- Date of birth: 7 September 1965 (age 61)
- Place of birth: Piracicaba, Brazil

Team information
- Current team: Vila Nova (head coach)

Managerial career
- Years: Team
- 1985–1993: XV de Piracicaba (youth)
- 1995–1996: São Paulo (youth)
- 1997–2000: Internacional U20
- 2000–2002: Internacional (assistant)
- 2002: Internacional
- 2003: Noroeste
- 2003–2004: Penafiel
- 2004: Naval
- 2005: Corinthians Alagoano
- 2007: 15 de Novembro-RS
- 2008–2010: Internacional (assistant)
- 2008: Internacional (interim)
- 2011: Mogi Mirim U20
- 2011: Mogi Mirim
- 2011: Criciúma
- 2011: ABC
- 2012: Mogi Mirim
- 2012–2013: Ponte Preta
- 2013–2014: Portuguesa
- 2014: Figueirense
- 2014–2015: Ponte Preta
- 2015–2016: Chapecoense
- 2016–2017: Bahia
- 2017: Internacional
- 2018: Bahia
- 2018: Chapecoense
- 2019–2020: Sport Recife
- 2020–2021: Ceará
- 2021–2022: Bahia
- 2022: Coritiba
- 2023: Goiás
- 2023: Ceará
- 2023–2024: Coritiba
- 2024: Sport Recife
- 2025: Cuiabá
- 2025: Remo
- 2026–: Vila Nova

Augusto Sérgio "Guto" Ferreira (born 7 September 1965), nicknamed "Gordiola" is a Brazilian professional football coach, currently the head coach of Vila Nova.

== Career ==
Born in Piracicaba, São Paulo, Ferreira began his career with hometown side XV de Piracicaba. After a quick spell at Guarani as a performance analyst, he joined São Paulo's youth sides in 1995.

In 2000, after spending three years with the youth teams, Ferreira was named assistant coach of Internacional; in 2002, he was named interim after the dismissal of Ivo Wortmann. He won that year's Campeonato Gaúcho and was permanently appointed as head coach on 4 June 2002, but was still sacked on 26 August.

On 15 May 2003, Ferreira was appointed head coach of Noroeste. The following 17 August he moved abroad, joining Segunda Liga side Penafiel.

On 4 February 2004, Ferreira was dismissed. He was appointed at the helm of Naval on 4 March, but was relieved of his duties on 12 September.

In 2005 Ferreira returned to Brazil, being appointed at Corinthians Alagoano. After a spell back at Inter as a youth coordinator and at 15 de Novembro, he returned to Internacional in 2008, again as an assistant; he was also an interim in June 2008, after the departure of Abel Braga.

In the following two years, Ferreira managed Mogi Mirim (two stints), Criciúma and ABC. On 24 September 2012, he was appointed head coach of Ponte Preta.

Ferreira was dismissed on 6 June 2013, and on 28 July he was named Portuguesa head coach, with the side seriously threatened with relegation. He managed to finish 12th with the club, but the side ultimately suffered relegation due to irregularly fielding in a player; in the following February, he resigned.

On 24 July 2014, immediately after leaving Figueirense, Ferreira returned to Ponte. He was sacked on 3 August 2015, and was appointed head coach of Chapecoense on 14 September.

On 24 June 2016, Ferreira left Chape after agreeing to a deal with Bahia. He left the club in the same manner the following 30 May, after returning to Inter, now in the first team.

On 11 November 2017, after a 1–1 draw against Vila Nova and thus losing the leadership of 2017 Campeonato Brasileiro Série B, Ferreira was relieved from his duties. On 26 December, he returned to Bahia, but was sacked the following 3 June.

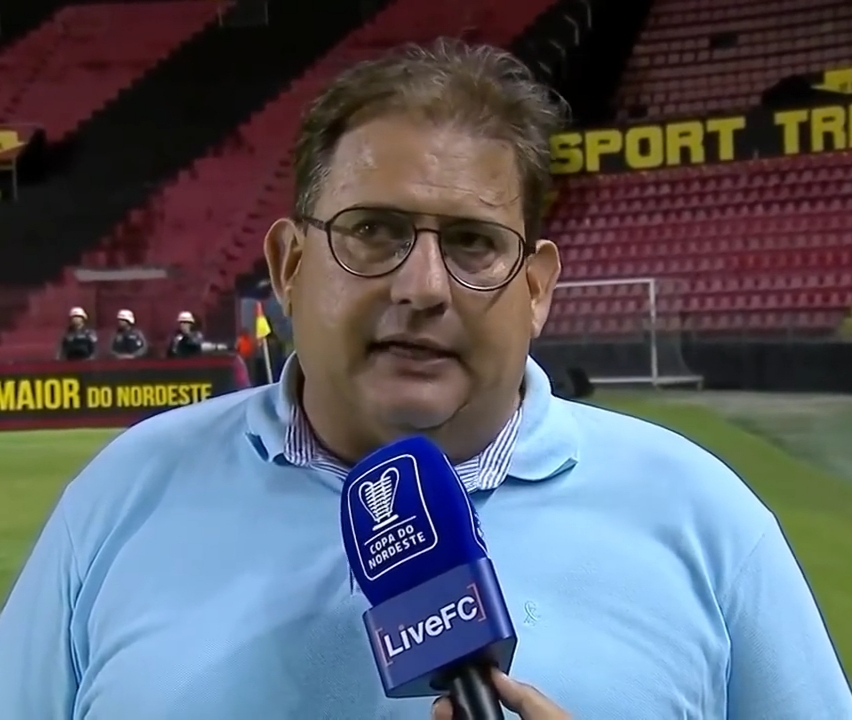
Ferreira as head coach of Sport Recife in 2020

On 7 August 2018, Ferreira was appointed head coach of Chape for the second time, but was dismissed on 15 October. On 20 February of the following year, he took over Sport Recife, helping in their promotion to the first division at the end of the season but being dismissed on 13 February 2020 after a poor start of the campaign.

On 18 March 2020, Ferreira was named Ceará head coach in the place of Enderson Moreira. He was sacked by the club on 29 August of the following year, after nearly 100 matches in charge.

On 6 October 2021, Ferreira returned to Bahia for a third spell, replacing Diego Dabove. He was kept in charge of the club despite their relegation, but was dismissed on 26 June 2022.

On 16 August 2022, Ferreira returned to the top tier after being announced as head coach of Coritiba. On 9 December, despite avoiding relegation, he was sacked, and was announced in charge of fellow top tier side Goiás the following day.

On 10 April 2023, after losing the 2023 Campeonato Goiano, Ferreira was sacked by Goiás, and returned to Ceará on 29 June. On 29 August, he was dismissed by the latter club.

Ferreira returned to Coxa on 27 November 2023, with their relegation already confirmed. He was sacked the following 3 May, after a poor start in the 2024 Série B, and returned to Sport on 26 July 2024, where he was also dismissed after just five matches.

On 21 February 2025, Ferreira replaced sacked Bernardo Franco as head coach of Cuiabá. He lost the Campeonato Matogrossense title to Primavera, and was himself dismissed on 10 August.

On 22 September 2025, Ferreira was announced as head coach of Remo also in the second division. He led the club to a promotion to the top tier after 32 years, but left in December after failing to agree new terms.

On 22 March 2026, Ferreira was announced as head coach of Vila Nova, also in the second division.

== Coaching statistics ==
As of 10 October 2026

Coaching record by team and tenure
Team	Nat	From	To	Record								Ref
Team	Nat	From	To	G	W	D	L	GF	GA	GD	Win %	Ref
Internacional	(Brazil)	24 May 2002	26 August 2002	8	4	2	2	16	13	+3	50.00	
Penafiel	(Portugal)	17 August 2003	4 February 2004	20	9	6	5	30	22	+8	45.00	
Naval	(Portugal)	4 March 2004	12 September 2004	10	2	4	4	11	14	−3	20.00	
Corinthians Alagoano	(Brazil)	January 2005	28 February 2005	8	3	3	2	15	7	+8	37.50	
15 de Novembro	(Brazil)	January 2007	17 February 2007	7	1	3	3	7	13	−6	14.29	
Internacional (interim)	(Brazil)	1 June 2008	12 June 2008	1	0	0	1	1	3	−2	0.00	
Mogi Mirim	(Brazil)	9 February 2011	28 April 2011	12	5	3	4	16	13	+3	41.67	
Criciúma	(Brazil)	13 June 2011	3 August 2011	11	5	3	3	9	7	+2	45.45	
ABC	(Brazil)	15 August 2011	31 August 2011	4	0	2	2	4	10	−6	0.00	
Mogi Mirim	(Brazil)	13 December 2011	23 September 2012	35	18	9	8	58	42	+16	51.43	
Ponte Preta	(Brazil)	24 September 2012	6 June 2013	41	19	11	11	50	39	+11	46.34	
Portuguesa	(Brazil)	28 July 2013	2 February 2014	36	11	10	15	45	42	+3	30.56	
Figueirense	(Brazil)	30 April 2014	24 July 2014	11	3	1	7	8	13	−5	27.27	
Ponte Preta	(Brazil)	24 July 2014	3 August 2015	66	32	17	17	99	70	+29	48.48	
Chapecoense	(Brazil)	14 September 2015	24 June 2016	51	23	18	10	78	41	+37	45.10	
Bahia	(Brazil)	24 June 2016	30 May 2017	57	31	15	11	94	37	+57	54.39	
Internacional	(Brazil)	30 May 2017	11 November 2017	33	17	9	7	46	25	+21	51.52	
Bahia	(Brazil)	26 December 2017	3 June 2018	33	18	6	9	53	27	+26	54.55	
Chapecoense	(Brazil)	7 August 2018	15 October 2018	13	4	1	8	12	20	−8	30.77	
Sport Recife	(Brazil)	20 February 2019	13 February 2020	54	25	23	6	77	41	+36	46.30	
Ceará	(Brazil)	18 March 2020	29 August 2021	94	41	30	23	135	94	+41	43.62	
Bahia	(Brazil)	6 October 2021	26 June 2022	47	20	10	17	61	41	+20	42.55	
Coritiba	(Brazil)	16 August 2022	9 December 2022	16	6	2	8	16	26	−10	37.50	
Goiás	(Brazil)	10 December 2022	10 April 2023	25	16	6	3	44	16	+28	64.00	
Ceará	(Brazil)	29 June 2023	29 August 2023	11	3	5	3	9	9	+0	27.27	
Coritiba	(Brazil)	27 November 2023	3 May 2024	21	9	5	7	32	21	+11	42.86	
Sport Recife	(Brazil)	26 July 2024	28 August 2024	5	1	1	3	4	7	−3	20.00	
Cuiabá	(Brazil)	21 February 2025	10 August 2025	26	13	4	9	34	26	+8	50.00	
Remo	(Brazil)	22 September 2025	5 December 2025	11	7	2	2	23	15	+8	63.64	
Vila Nova	(Brazil)	22 March 2026	present	37	19	9	9	53	34	+19	51.35	
Total				804	365	220	219	1,140	788	+352	45.40	—

== Honours ==
Internacional

- Campeonato Gaúcho: 2002
- Copa São Paulo de Futebol Júnior: 1998

Chapecoense

- Campeonato Catarinense: 2016

Bahia

- Copa do Nordeste: 2017
- Campeonato Baiano: 2018

Sport

- Campeonato Pernambucano: 2019

Ceará

- Copa do Nordeste: 2020
