= Paulo Cesar Farias =

- Born: Paulo César Siqueira Cavalcante Farias; September 20, 1945; Passo de Camaragibe, Alagoas
- Died: June 23, 1996 (aged 50); Maceió, Alagoas, Brazil
- Cause of death: Murder
- Other name: P.C. Farias
- Occupation: politician

Paulo Cesar Siqueira Cavalcante Farias (September 20, 1945 – June 23, 1996) commonly known as Paulo Cesar Farias or PC Farias, was the political campaign treasurer of Brazilian President Fernando Collor de Mello and a central figure in the corruption scandal that resulted in Collor's 1992 removal from Brazil's presidential office.

== Corruption scandal ==
PC (as he was colloquially known) was a successful and famous campaign treasurer in Alagoas and a relatively unsuccessful businessman before associating himself with Collor in 1981. As campaign treasurer, PC typically collected much more than he spent on the campaign. The remainder (which was estimated to be over 50 million US dollars) was invested in his own businesses (such as an air taxi service) or hidden in anonymous overseas accounts.

Once Collor was elected, PC Farias masterminded the vast corruption scheme that rendered Collor's presidency a high-priced toll booth for government favors. He set up dummy companies to collect bribes, with 30 percent of the money going to him and 70 percent to Collor. As much as US $9 million went to PC's accounts between 1990 and 1992. As the corruption scandal emerged in 1992, it was revealed that a fraction of money from PC's businesses was sent directly to Collor to finance the president's personal expenditures, including household staff and extensive landscaping at his home in Brasília.

After Collor's impeachment, PC fled to the UK and Thailand, where he was arrested by the Interpol and extradited back to Brazil. In 1994, he was condemned to 7 years in prison. In December 1995, the Supreme Court (STF) granted a conditional release.

== Death ==
In 1996, PC and his young girlfriend Suzana Marcolino were found both dead, shot by a .38 Special caliber Rossi revolver in PC's beach house in Maceió. Local police ascribed the deaths to a crime of passion, where Suzana, fearing the imminent dissolution of the relationship, shot PC and then herself. Others would claim it was a form of "destruction of evidence" over what PC may know and subsequently reveal. In 1999, both their bodies were exhumed and subjected to another round of forensic examinations by three separate experts from three different institutions. Their conclusions were that while there was not enough evidence to rule out suicide, there was evidence to suggest it was not a suicide. Subsequently PC Farias' brother, Augusto Farias, and eight others were charged with the murder.

Four former police officers who were working as PC's bodyguards were put on trial for failing to prevent the killing, the jury found the four men not guilty. The jurors also ruled that the death was a double homicide.

Farias is depicted in the 2024 documentary film Morcego Negro.

== See also ==
- List of unsolved murders (1980–1999)
- List of scandals in Brazil
