= Norberto (footballer) =

Brazilian footballer (born 1990)

Personal information
- Full name: Norberto Pereira Marinho Neto
- Date of birth: 19 July 1990 (age 36)
- Place of birth: Brumado, Brazil
- Height: 1.75 m (5 ft 9 in)
- Position: Right back

Team information
- Current team: América de Natal

Youth career
- –2010: América-RN

Senior career*
Years	Team	Apps	(Gls)
2010–2013	América-RN	81	(5)
2014–2018	Ypiranga-BA	0	(0)
2014–2015	→ Coritiba (loan)	71	(2)
2015–2017	→ Vitória (loan)	15	(0)
2017–2018	→ América Mineiro (loan)	59	(2)
2019	Sport Recife	42	(1)
2020–2021	CSA	52	(3)
2021	Cruzeiro	16	(0)
2022	Ponte Preta	26	(1)
2023–	América de Natal	4	(0)
- * Club domestic league appearances and goals as of 25 January 2023

Norberto Pereira Marinho Neto (born 19 July 1990), simply known as Norberto, is a Brazilian footballer who plays as a right back for América de Natal.

== Honours ==
América-RN

- Campeonato Potiguar: 2012
- Copa RN: 2012, 2013
- Copa Ecohouse: 2013

Vitória

- Campeonato Baiano: 2016, 2017

América Mineiro

- Campeonato Brasileiro Série B: 2017

Sport

- Campeonato Pernambucano: 2019

CSA

- Campeonato Alagoano: 2021
