= Thiago Fernandes (footballer, born 2001) =

Brazilian footballer

Personal information
- Full name: Thiago Fernandes Rodrigues
- Date of birth: 13 March 2001 (age 25)
- Place of birth: Recife, Brazil
- Height: 1.70 m (5 ft 7 in)
- Positions: Forward; winger

Team information
- Current team: CRB
- Number: 17

Youth career
- 2018: Náutico
- 2020: Flamengo

Senior career*
Years	Team	Apps	(Gls)
2019	Náutico	17	(5)
2020–2024	Flamengo	2	(0)
2020	→ Náutico (loan)	12	(0)
2022	→ Houston Dynamo (loan)	3	(0)
2022	→ Houston Dynamo 2 (loan)	6	(0)
2023	→ CSA (loan)	9	(0)
2023	→ Sampaio Corrêa (loan)	2	(0)
2024	→ Treze (loan)	19	(10)
2025–	CRB	75	(14)
- * Club domestic league appearances and goals as of 16 November 2026

Thiago Fernandes Rodrigues (born 13 March 2001), sometimes known as just Thiago or Thiaguinho, is a Brazilian professional footballer who plays as a forward for Campeonato Brasileiro Série B club CRB.

== Career ==
=== Early career ===
Born in the Pina neighborhood of southern Recife, Thiago Fernandes was rejected from trials with Sport Recife and Palmeiras before being signed by Náutico of Recife.

=== Náutico ===
Thiago Fernandes made his professional debut for Náutico on 15 January 2019, playing the full 90 minutes in a 3–1 loss to Fortaleza in a Copa do Nordeste match. On 16 February he scored his first goal for Náutico in a 4–2 win over Flamengo de Arcoverde in a Campeonato Pernambucano match. 2019 saw Thiago emerge as a starter for Náutico at the age of 18, primarily playing as a right-winger. He finished the 2019 Campeonato Brasileiro Série C season as Náutico's second-leading goal scorer with 5 goals in 17 appearances. Thiago helped Náutico finish as Série C champions and earned promotion to Série B. Náutico also finished runners-up in the 2019 Campeonato Pernambucano (where Thiago earned recognition as the league "Revelação," or "Best Newcomer") and reached the semi-finals of the Copa do Nordeste.

=== Flamengo ===
On 12 December 2019, Náutico announced Thiago Fernandes' transfer to Série A club Flamengo for an undisclosed fee. Náutico maintained an 18% sell-on fee.

==== Náutico (loan) ====
On 7 May 2020, after playing for the Flamengo under-20 team and failing to make a first team appearance, Flamengo loaned Thiago Fernandes back to Náutico for the remainder of the season to get first team minutes. On 19 July, in his first game back for Náutico, Thiago scored in a 2–1 win over Salgueiro in a Campeonato Pernambucano match. He did not replicate his form from his previous stint with Náutico, scoring once and recording one assist in 15 appearances across all competitions. On 5 November, Flamengo and Náutico agreed to end the loan early, with Thiago returning to the Flamengo U-20s for the remainder of 2020.

On 2 March 2021 Thiago made his debut for the Flamengo first team in a Campeonato Carioca match, a 1–0 win over Nova Iguaçu. He made his Série A debut on 6 December, coming off the bench in a 1–0 loss to Santos. Thiago ended the season with 7 first team appearances, 2 in Série A, where Flamengo finished in 2nd place, and 5 in the Campeonato Carioca, helping Flamengo win the state league title. He primarily played with the under-20 team throughout the season.

During the 2022 season, he played twice in the Campeonato Carioca before being loaned to Houston.

==== Houston Dynamo (loan) ====
On 21 March 2022, Thiago Fernandes was loaned to Major League Soccer club Houston Dynamo for the remainder of the 2022 season as a U-22 Initiative signing, with Houston having an option to make the deal permanent. On 19 April he made his Dynamo, getting the start in a 2–1 win over Rio Grande Valley FC in a U.S. Open Cup match. He made his MLS debut on 30 April, coming off the bench in a 2–1 loss to Austin FC. Thiago ended the season with a total of 19 minutes across 3 regular season appearances, plus 2 starts in the Open Cup, as the Dynamo finished 13th in the Western Conference, failing to qualify for the playoffs. He also made 6 appearances with Houston Dynamo 2 in MLS Next Pro.

==== CSA (loan) ====
On 6 February 2023, Thiago Fernandes was loaned to Série C side CSA. Thiaguinho made his debut for CSA on 11 February, coming off the bench in a 1–0 win over Cruzeiro de Arapiraca in a Campeonato Alagoano. He ended his loan with CSA earlier than expected in July.

==== Sampaio Corrêa (loan) ====
On 19 July 2023, Thiago moved to Sampaio Corrêa on loan until 31 December 2023.

==== CRB ====
Thiago moved to Clube de Regatas Brasil on a free.

== Career statistics ==
As of 6 September 2023

Appearances and goals by club, season and competition
Club	Season	League			State League		Cup (Note: Includes Copa do Brasil and U.S. Open Cup.)		Continental		Other		Total	
Club	Season	Division	Apps	Goals	Apps	Goals	Apps	Goals	Apps	Goals	Apps	Goals	Apps	Goals
Náutico	2019	Série C	17	5	12 (Note: Appearance(s) in Campeonato Pernambucano)	2	1	0	—		9 (Note: Appearance(s) in Copa do Nordeste)	1	39	8
Flamengo	2020	Série A	—		—		—		—		—		0	0
Flamengo	2021	Série A	2	0	5 (Note: Appearance(s) in Campeonato Carioca)	0	—		—		—		7	0
Flamengo	2022	Série A	0	0	2	0	—		—		—		2	0
Flamengo	2023	Série A	0	0	2	0	—		—		—		2	0
Flamengo	Total		2	0	9	0	0	0	0	0	0	0	11	0
Náutico (loan)	2020	Série B	12	0	3	1	0	0	—		1	0	16	1
Houston Dynamo (loan)	2022	MLS	3	0	—		2	0	—		—		5	0
Houston Dynamo 2 (loan)	2022	MLS Next Pro	6	0	—		—		—		0	0	6	0
CSA (loan)	2023	Série C	9	0	1 (Note: Appearance(s) in Campeonato Alagoano)	0	3	1	—		4	0	17	1
Sampaio Corrêa (loan)	2023	Série B	2	0	—		—		—		—		2	0
Career total			51	5	25	3	6	1	0	0	14	1	96	10

== Honours ==
Náutico

- Campeonato Brasileiro Série C: 2019

Flamengo

- Campeonato Carioca: 2021

Individual

- Campeonato Pernambucano Best Newcomer: 2019
- 2024 Campeonato Brasileiro Série D top scorer: 10 goals
