= Estádio Carlos de Alencar Pinto =

Football stadium in Fortaleza, Ceará, Brazil

Coordinates: 3°44′47″S 38°32′43″W

- Vovozão
- Interactive map of Estádio Carlos de Alencar Pinto
- Location: Fortaleza, Ceará, Brazil
- Owner: Ceará Sporting Club
- Capacity: 3,000

Construction
- Opened: 1968

Tenant
- Ceará Sporting Club

The Estádio Carlos de Alencar Pinto, better known as Vovozão, is a football stadium located in Fortaleza, Ceará, Brazil. It is currently used mostly for training and is the home stadium of Ceará Sporting Club.
