= Álvaro (footballer, born 1997) =

Brazilian footballer

Personal information
- Full name: Álvaro Vieira de Oliveira
- Date of birth: 9 September 1997 (age 29)
- Place of birth: Paudalho, Brazil
- Height: 1.85 m (6 ft 1 in)
- Position: Forward

Team information
- Current team: Brusque
- Number: 18

Senior career*
Years	Team	Apps	(Gls)
2015	Tapajós		
2016–2017	Salgueiro	43	(11)
2017–2021	Internacional	0	(0)
2019	→ Guarani (loan)	5	(0)
2019–2021	→ Náutico (loan)	26	(9)
2021–2022	Náutico	2	(0)
2022	→ Água Santa (loan)	9	(1)
2022	Al-Khor	4	(0)
2023	Ceará	6	(2)
2023	América de Natal	10	(2)
2024	Caxias	28	(10)
2024	Ituano	7	(1)
2025	Operário Ferroviário	13	(0)
2025–	Brusque	33	(4)
- * Club domestic league appearances and goals as of 9 November 2026

Álvaro Vieira de Oliveira (born 9 September 1997), simply known as Álvaro, is a Brazilian professional footballer who plays as a forward for Brusque.

== Career ==
Álvaro began his professional career with Tapajós in Pará. He later played for Salgueiro, and at the age of 20, he was subsequently hired by Internacional, where he played for the B and U23 teams, becoming Brazilian champion in 2017. After being loaned to Guarani, he arrived at Náutico|, being one of the team's top scorers in the 2019 Série C campaign. He remained at the club until 2022, when he was loaned to Água Santa and later sold to Al-Khor.

In March 2023, Álvaro was announced by Ceará, where he was part of the winning squad of the Copa do Nordeste. In June, it was announced by América de Natal. For the 2024 season he played for Caxias, where he made 28 appearances and scored 10 goals. In August 2024, he was announced by Ituano. For the 2025 season, Álvaro signed with Operário Ferroviário. In April, he transferred to Brusque.

== Honours ==
Internacional

- Campeonato Brasileiro Sub-23: 2017

Náutico

- Campeonato Brasileiro Série C: 2019
- Campeonato Pernambucano: 2021, 2022

Ceará

- Copa do Nordeste: 2023

Operário Ferroviário

- Campeonato Paranaense: 2025
