= Gómez Farías Municipality, Chihuahua =

Municipality in the Mexican state of Chihuahua

Gómez Farías
- Municipality

- Location in Mexico
- Coordinates: 29°21′N 107°44′W
- Country: Mexico
- State: Chihuahua
- Municipal seat: Valentín Gómez Farías

Area
  - Total: 986.6 km^{2} (380.9 sq mi)

Population (2010)
  - Total: 8,624

Gómez Farías is one of the 67 municipalities of Chihuahua, in northern Mexico. The municipal seat lies at Valentín Gómez Farías, Chihuahua. The municipality covers an area of 986.6 km^{2}.

It was named for Valentín Gómez Farías, a 19th-century President of the Republic.

As of 2010, the municipality had a total population of 8,624, up from 7,583 as of 2005.

The municipality had 42 localities, the largest of which (with 2010 populations in parentheses) were: Valentín Gómez Farías (5,330), classified as urban, and Peña Blanca (1,092), classified as rural.
