= Augusto Farias =

Brazilian politician

Augusto Farias is a Brazilian politician from the state of Alagoas. He is a brother of the murdered businessman Paulo Cesar Farias, who was the campaign treasurer of Brazilian President Fernando Collor de Mello. PC Farias was murdered in June 1996. On November 18, 1999, Augusto Farias was formally charged with being a co-conspirator in the murder of his brother. The charges were filed by prosecutors who gathered new evidence in the third investigation into the murders. The first two inquiries ruled that PC Farias was the victim of a murder-suicide.
