= Suéliton (footballer, born 1991) =

Brazilian footballer

Personal information
- Full name: Suéliton Florencio Nogueira
- Date of birth: 26 June 1991 (age 35)
- Place of birth: Guarabira, Brazil
- Height: 1.87 m (6 ft 1 1/2 in)
- Position: Centre back

Team information
- Current team: Betim Futebol Clube

Senior career*
Years	Team	Apps	(Gls)
2010	Campinense	2	(0)
2011	Ponte Preta	0	(0)
2012	Mogi Mirim	2	(0)
2012–2014	CSP	15	(3)
2014–2016	ABC	86	(2)
2016	→ América Mineiro (loan)	31	(0)
2017	CSP	4	(0)
2017	→ Cuiabá (loan)	3	(0)
2017	Vitória Guimarães B	2	(0)
2018	Santo André	12	(0)
2018–2019	Náutico	24	(1)
2018	→ Red Bull Brasil (loan)	8	(0)
2019	Oriente Petrolero	17	(0)
2020–2021	Ituano	41	(3)
2021	Remo	3	(0)
2021–2022	ABC	12	(1)
2022	AA Portuguesa	2	(0)
2022	Rio Claro FC	10	(0)
2022-	Betim Futebol Clube	0	(0)
- * Club domestic league appearances and goals as of 18:01, 25 April 2022 (UTC)

Suéliton Florencio Nogueira (born 26 June 1991), simply known as Suéliton, is a Brazilian footballer who plays as a central defender for Betim Futebol Clube.

== Club career ==
Suéliton was born in Guarabira, Paraíba. A Campinense youth graduate, he made his first team debut on 1 August 2010, in a 2–0 home win against Salgueiro for the Série C championship.

In 2011 Suéliton moved to Ponte Preta, but failed to make a single appearance for the club during his spell. He subsequently moved to Mogi Mirim in the following year, but only appeared in two Série D matches.

In 2012 Suéliton returned to his native state, after agreeing to a contract with CSP. After being initially assigned to the youth setup, he was promoted to the main squad in 2014, appearing regularly in the year's Campeonato Paraibano.

On 19 February 2014 Suéliton was loaned to ABC, until the end of the year. He made his professional debut on 19 April, in a 1–1 Série B away draw against Santa Cruz.

Suéliton scored his first professional goal on 6 September 2014, netting his team's second in a 2–1 home win against the same opponent. On 13 February 2015, he was signed outright.

On 21 December 2015 Suéliton was loaned to América Mineiro, newly promoted to Série A, for one year.

== Honours ==
ABC

- Copa RN: 2015

América Mineiro

- Campeonato Mineiro: 2016

Cuiabá

- Campeonato Mato-Grossense: 2017
