= Xinho =

Brazilian footballer

Personal information
- Full name: Alexandre Farias de Lima Júnior
- Date of birth: June 30, 1989 (age 37)
- Place of birth: Varzea Grande, Brazil
- Height: 1.77 m (5 ft 10 in)
- Positions: Defensive midfielder; left back

Team information
- Current team: Cabense
- Number: 7

Youth career
- 2005–2009: Sport

Senior career*
Years	Team	Apps	(Gls)
2007–2010	Sport		
2011	Cabense	16	(1)
2012	Sousa	9	(0)
2013	Belo Jardim	21	(0)
2013–	Central	4	(0)
- * Club domestic league appearances and goals as of September 9, 2013

Alexandre Farias de Lima Júnior or simply Xinho (born June 30, 1989), is a Brazilian defensive midfielder and left back. He has played for Sport, Cabense, Sousa, Belo Jardim and Central.
