= Josa (footballer) =

Brazilian footballer

Personal information
- Full name: Joseilson Batista dos Santos
- Date of birth: 24 September 1984 (age 42)
- Place of birth: Amargosa, Brazil
- Height: 1.82 m (5 ft 11 1/2 in)
- Position: Midfielder

Team information
- Current team: Amargosa, Brazil (Superintendente de Esporte)

Senior career*
Years	Team	Apps	(Gls)
2006	Esporte de Patos		
2007	América–SE		
2007–2008	Santa Clara	22	(0)
2008–2009	Paços de Ferreira	6	(0)
2009	América–SE		
2010	Juazeirense		
2010	Sergipe		
2011–2015	Salgueiro	73	(1)
2012–2013	→ Náutico (loan)	28	(0)
2013	→ Cuiabá (loan)	8	(0)
2014	→ Ituano (loan)	18	(0)
2014	→ Vitória (loan)	7	(0)
2014	→ Boa Esporte (loan)	6	(0)
2015	→ Ituano (loan)	10	(0)
2015	CRB	19	(1)
2016	Mogi Mirim	10	(0)
2016	Água Santa	7	(1)
2016–2017	Figueirense	17	(2)
2018–2020	Náutico	74	(2)
2020–2021	Jacuipense	13	(0)
2021	Central	6	(0)
2021–2022	Caruaru City		
2022–	Castanhal	2	(0)
- * Club domestic league appearances and goals as of 8 August 2021

Joseilson Batista dos Santos (born 24 September 1984), known as Josa, is a Brazilian Superintendente de Esporte, Prefeitura de Amargosa.

== Career statistics ==
As of 26 January 2017

Club	Season	League			State League		Cup		Continental		Other		Total	
Club	Season	Division	Apps	Goals	Apps	Goals	Apps	Goals	Apps	Goals	Apps	Goals	Apps	Goals
Santa Clara	2007–08	LigaPro	22	0	—		—		—		—		22	0
Paços de Ferreira	2008–09	Primeira Liga	6	0	—		1	0	—		3 (Note: All appearance(s) in Taça da Liga)	0	10	0
Salgueiro	2011	Série B	27	0	17	1	—		—		—		44	1
Salgueiro	2012	Série C	8	0	21	0	—		—		—		29	0
Salgueiro	Subtotal		35	0	38	1	—		—		—		73	1
Náutico	2012	Série A	13	0	—		—		—		—		13	0
Náutico	2013	Série A	4	0	9	0	2	0	—		—		15	0
Náutico	Subtotal		17	0	9	0	2	0	—		—		28	0
Cuiabá	2013	Série C	8	0	—		—		—		—		8	0
Ituano	2014	Série D	—		18	0	—		—		—		18	0
Vitória	2014	Série A	7	0	—		—		—		—		7	0
Boa Esporte	2014	Série B	6	0	—		—		—		—		6	0
Ituano	2015	Paulista	—		10	0	—		—		—		10	0
CRB	2015	Série B	19	1	—		—		—		—		19	1
Mogi Mirim	2016	Paulista	—		10	0	—		—		—		10	0
Água Santa	2016	Paulista	—		—		—		—		7 (Note: All appearance(s) in Copa Paulista)	1	7	1
Figueirense	2016	Série A	8	0	—		—		—		—		8	0
Figueirense	2017	Série B	—		—		—		—		1 (Note: All appearance(s) in Primeira Liga)	0	1	0
Figueirense	Subtotal		8	0	—		—		—		1	0	9	0
Career total			128	1	85	1	3	0	0	0	11	1	227	3
