= Luiz Henrique (footballer, born 1997) =

Brazilian footballer

Personal information
- Full name: Luiz Henrique Beserra dos Santos
- Date of birth: 19 April 1997 (age 29)
- Place of birth: Maceió, Brazil
- Height: 1.71 m (5 ft 7 in)
- Position: Midfielder

Team information
- Current team: Athletic

Senior career*
Years	Team	Apps	(Gls)
2017–2019	Náutico	48	(6)
2018	→ Bahia (loan)	1	(0)
2019–2024	Moreirense	4	(0)
2020–2021	→ Oliveirense (loan)	9	(0)
2021	→ Náutico (loan)	26	(0)
2022	→ CSA (loan)	13	(0)
2023	→ Brusque (loan)	11	(0)
2024–	Athletic	0	(0)
- * Club domestic league appearances and goals as of 19:15, 16 January 2024 (UTC)

Luiz Henrique Beserra dos Santos (born 19 April 1997), better known as Luiz Henrique, is a Brazilian professional footballer who plays as a midfielder for Série C club Athletic.

== Professional career ==
Luiz Henrique made his professional debut with Náutico in a 0-0 Campeonato Brasileiro Série B tie with Criciúma on 14 November 2017.

On 11 July 2019, he signed a five-year contract with Portuguese Primeira Liga club Moreirense.

For the 2023 season, Luiz Henrique joined Brusque on loan from Moreirense.

On 15 January 2024, he joined recently-promoted to Série C club Athletic.
