= Diego Silva (footballer, born 1993) =

Brazilian association football player

Personal information
- Full name: Diego Claudino da Silva
- Date of birth: 26 March 1993 (age 33)
- Place of birth: Recife, Brazil
- Height: 1.87 m (6 ft 1 1/2 in)
- Position: Centre back

Team information
- Current team: Rayong
- Number: 28

Youth career
- Santa Cruz-PE
- Náutico

Senior career*
Years	Team	Apps	(Gls)
2013–2015	Náutico	31	(2)
2016–2017	Santos	0	(0)
2017	Nacional	3	(0)
2017	Salgueiro	0	(0)
2017–2018	→ Náutico (loan)	2	(0)
2018–2021	Náutico	36	(3)
2021	Retrô	14	(2)
2021–2022	Uberlândia EC	12	(0)
2022	Guarany	8	(0)
2022–2023	Nação	16	(2)
2023	Alagoinhas	5	(0)
2023	Campinense	7	(0)
2023–2024	Portuguesa	21	(0)
2024	Esportiva	11	(0)
2024–	Rayong	17	(1)
- * Club domestic league appearances and goals as of 7 February 2025

Diego Claudino da Silva (born 26 March 1993), known as Diego Silva or simply Diego, is a Brazilian footballer who plays as a central defender for Thai League 1 club Rayong.

== Club career ==
Born in Recife, Pernambuco, Diego Silva was a Náutico youth graduate. In January 2013 he was promoted to the main squad, and made his senior debut late in the month by starting in a 2–2 Campeonato Pernambucano away draw against Chã Grande/Decisão.

On 16 October 2013 Diego Silva made his Série A debut, coming on as a late substitute for Derley in a 0–3 away loss against São Paulo. He finished the campaign with six appearances, as his side suffered relegation as dead last; he also extended his contract until 2015 shortly after his top level debut.

After being rarely used in 2014, Diego Silva was a regular starter in 2015. He scored his first professional goal on 16 May 2015, scoring a last-minute winner in a victory at Boa Esporte.

In July 2015, Diego Silva suffered a knee injury, being sidelined for two months. He subsequently lost his starting spot after his return, and was released.

On 13 January 2015 Diego Silva joined Santos, being initially assigned to the B-team. Sixteen days later he was promoted to the main squad, due to limited options in his position.

On 10 July 2017, after only making appearances for the B-team, Diego Silva moved abroad after joining C.D. Nacional on a one-year deal.

== Career statistics ==
As of 17 October 2016

Club	Season	League			State League		Cup		Continental		Other		Total	
Club	Season	Division	Apps	Goals	Apps	Goals	Apps	Goals	Apps	Goals	Apps	Goals	Apps	Goals
Náutico	2013	Série A	6	0	3	0	—		—		—		9	0
Náutico	2014	Série B	1	0	1	0	—		—		1 (Note: All appearance(s) in Copa do Nordeste)	0	3	0
Náutico	2015	Série B	7	2	8	0	2	0	—		5	0	22	2
Náutico	Total		14	2	12	0	2	0	—		6	0	34	2
Santos	2016	Série A	0	0	0	0	0	0	0	0	4 (Note: Appearance(s) in Copa Paulista)	0	4	0
Career total			14	2	12	0	2	0	—		10	0	38	2
