= Wallace Pernambucano =

Brazilian footballer

Personal information
- Full name: Wallace Philipe Freitas da Silva
- Date of birth: 4 February 1987 (age 39)
- Place of birth: Escada, Brazil
- Height: 1.84 m (6 ft 0 in)
- Position: Forward

Team information
- Current team: Brasiliense

Senior career*
Years	Team	Apps	(Gls)
2011	Cabense	10	(1)
2012–2016	Confiança	97	(18)
2013	→ Treze (loan)	5	(0)
2017	Sergipe	10	(1)
2017	Ceará	13	(2)
2018–2019	Náutico	72	(22)
2018	→ Brasil de Pelotas (loan)	11	(0)
2020–2021	América-RN	56	(33)
2021	Santa Cruz	7	(0)
2022–2023	América-RN	74	(34)
2024	Capital-DF	13	(7)
2024	Treze	16	(5)
2025	Capital-DF	25	(6)
2026–	Brasiliense		
- * Club domestic league appearances and goals as of 3 September 2025

Wallace Philipe Freitas da Silva (born 4 February 1987), better known as Wallace Pernambucano, is a Brazilian professional footballer who plays as a forward for Brasiliense.

== Career ==
Wallace began his career as a professional at AD Cabense. He later played for Confiança, where he was state champion in 2014 and 2015, Treze, Sergipe, Ceará, being state champion again, Náutico where he won Série C in 2019 and Brasil de Pelotas, until arriving at América-RN. For América de Natal, Wallace reached the mark of 67 goals scored in 130 matches, entering the top-5 of highest scorers in the team's history, won the Série D title in 2022 and Potiguar in 2023.

On 16 October 2023, IS announced that Wallace will defend Capital-DF in the 2024 season. After the Campeonato Brasiliense, he played for Treze at the 2024 Campeonato Brasileiro Série D. After playing the 2025 season for Capital CF, in September he signed a contract with Brasiliense for 2026.

== Honours ==
Confiança

- Campeonato Sergipano: 2014, 2015

Ceará

- Campeonato Cearense: 2017

Náutico

- Campeonato Brasileiro Série C: 2019
- Campeonato Pernambucano: 2018

América de Natal

- Campeonato Brasileiro Série D: 2022
- Campeonato Potiguar: 2023

Individual

- 2020 Campeonato Brasileiro Série D top scorer: 12 goals
