= Alisson Farias =

Brazilian footballer (born 1996)

Personal information
- Full name: Alisson Alves Farias
- Date of birth: 7 April 1996 (age 30)
- Place of birth: Lages, Brazil
- Height: 1.71 m (5 ft 7 in)
- Position: Left winger

Team information
- Current team: Quy Nhon Binh Dinh
- Number: 10

Youth career
- 2010–2011: Atlético Paranaense
- 2012–2014: Internacional

Senior career*
Years	Team	Apps	(Gls)
2015–2018	Internacional	27	(1)
2016–2017	→ Estoril (loan)	13	(2)
2017	→ Criciúma (loan)	7	(0)
2018	→ Brasil de Pelotas (loan)	19	(2)
2018	→ Coritiba (loan)	17	(2)
2019	Sport Recife	10	(0)
2019	CRB	34	(6)
2020–2021	Vitória	33	(6)
2021	→ CRB (loan)	19	(1)
2022–2024	Chapecoense	35	(3)
2024–	Quy Nhon Binh Dinh	4	(1)

International career
2012–2013	Brazil U17	8	(0)
- * Club domestic league appearances and goals as of 4 October 2024

Alisson Alves Farias (born 7 April 1996) is a Brazilian professional footballer who plays as a forward for Club V.League 1 club Quy Nhon Binh Dinh.

== Club career ==
=== Internacional ===
Alisson Farias made his league debut for Internacional against Novo Hamburgo on 7 February 2015. He scored his first goal for the club against Cruzeiro RS on 20 February 2016.

=== Estoril ===
Alisson Farias made his league debut for Estoril against FC Porto on 20 August 2016. He scored his first goal for the club against S.C. Braga on 27 August 2016, scoring in the 47th minute.

=== Criciúma ===
Alisson Farias made his league debut for Criciúma against Vila Nova on 1 July 2017."Vila Nova vs Criciúma - 1 July 2017". Soccerway.

=== Brasil de Pelotas ===
Alisson Farias made his league debut for Brasil de Pelotas against EC Juventude on 17 January 2018. He scored his first goal for the club against Cruzeiro RS on 21 January 2018, scoring in the 61st minute.

=== Coritiba ===
Alisson Farias made his league debut for Coritiba against Boa on 20 May 2018.

=== Sport Recife ===
Alisson Farias made his league debut for Sport Recife against Flamengo Arcoverde on 19 January 2019.

=== CRB ===
Alisson Farias made his league debut for CRB against Coritiba on 21 May 2019. He scored his first goal for the club against Guarani FC on 13 July 2019, scoring in the 7th minute.

=== Vitória ===
Alisson Farias made his league debut for Vitória against Fortaleza on 25 January 2020. He scored his first league goal for the club against CRB on 28 February 2020.

=== Second spell at CRB ===
During his second spell at CRB, Alisson Farias made his league debut against Cruzeiro on 6 June 2021. He scored his first league goal for the club against Confiança on 12 June 2021, scoring in the 11th minute.

=== Chapecoense ===
Alisson Farias made his league debut for Chapecoense against Guarani FC on 20 July 2022. He scored his first league goal for the club against Novorizontino on 10 August 2022, scoring in the 28th minute.

=== CS Alagoano ===
Alisson Farias made his league debut for CS Alagoano against Cruzeiro Arapiraca on 24 January 2024. He scored his first goal for the club against CSE on 2 March 2024, scoring in the 87th minute.

=== Quy Nhon Binh Dinh ===
Following a transfer window that saw considerable team changes, Quy Nhon Binh Dinh, the 2023/24 V-League runners-up, have begun a rebuilding phase with the modest objective of avoiding relegation. The loss of numerous important players has created issues for the team.

To address the squad revamp, the club is concentrating on bringing in new players, including international talent. He is one signing on 5 September 9, 2024, a winger who has been sought to improve the team's offensive possibilities.

== International career ==
Farias has represented Brazil in under-17 level. He was part of the Brazil U17 squad that finished third in the 2013 South American Under-17 Football Championship.

== Honours ==
Internacional

- Campeonato Gaúcho: 2015, 2016
