= 2017 Campeonato Pernambucano =

Campeonato Pernambucano
- Season: 2017
- Champions: Sport (41st title)
- Relegated: Atlético Pernambucano; Serra Talhada
- 2018 Copa do Brasil: Salgueiro; Santa Cruz; Sport; Náutico (via RNC)
- 2018 Copa do Nordeste: Náutico; Salgueiro; Santa Cruz
- 2018 Série D: Belo Jardim; Central; Flamengo de Arcoverde
- Matches played: 95
- Goals scored: 220 (2.32 per match)
- Top goalscorer: Caxito (9 goals)

The 2017 Campeonato Pernambucano (officially the Pernambucano A1 2017) was the 103rd edition of the state championship of Pernambuco. The championship began on January 4 and ended on June 28. Twelve teams were competing, ten returning from the 2016 and two promoted from the 2016 Pernambucano A2 Championship (Flamengo de Arcoverde and Afogados).
Santa Cruz were the defending champions, but were eliminated by Salgueiro in the semi-finals.
Sport defeated Salgueiro 2–1 on aggregate to win their 41st Campeonato Pernambucano title.

== Teams ==
The teams in bold were qualified directly for the Second stage.

Club	City	Stadium	Coordinates	Capacity
Afogados	Afogados da Ingazeira	Valdemar Viana de Araújo	7.7585°S 37.6334°W	1,735
América	Recife	Ademir Cunha (Paulista)	7.9459°S 34.8904°W	12,000
Atlético Pernambucano	Carpina	Paulo Petribú	7.8488°S 35.2710°W	3,500
Belo Jardim	Belo Jardim	Antônio Inácio de Souza (Caruaru) (Note: Belo Jardim played their home matches at Caruaru instead of their regular stadium Estádio José Bezerra de Mendonça, Belo Jardim. However, their matches against Náutico (Feb. 20) and Sport (Mar. 19) were played at Estádio do Arruda and against Santa Cruz (Apr. 5) at Arena Pernambuco.)	8.2900°S 35.9831°W	6,000
Central	Caruaru	Lacerdão (Note: Central played their home matches against Flamengo de Arcoverde (Jan. 25), Náutico (Feb. 1) and Salgueiro (Mar. 26) at Estádio Antônio Inácio de Souza, against Santa Cruz (Feb. 9) at Arena Pernambuco, against Belo Jardim (Mar. 2) at Estádio Severino Cândido Carneiro. and against Sport (Mar. 9) at Estádio do Arruda.)	8.2786°S 35.9752°W	19,478
Flamengo de Arcoverde	Arcoverde	Áureo Bradley	8.4199°S 37.0583°W	3,000
**Náutico**	Recife	Arena Pernambuco (São Lourenço da Mata)	8.0406°S 35.0104°W	44,300
Salgueiro	Salgueiro	Cornélio de Barros	8.0761°S 39.1194°W	12,070
**Santa Cruz**	Recife	Arruda	8.0267°S 34.8933°W	60,044
Serra Talhada	Serra Talhada	Nildo Pereira de Menezes	7.9979°S 38.2953°W	5,000
**Sport**	Recife	Ilha do Retiro	8.0629°S 34.9051°W	32,983
Vitória das Tabocas	Vitória de Santo Antão	Severino Cândido Carneiro (Note: Vitória das Tabocas played their home match against Atlético Pernambucano (Mar. 8) at Estádio Antônio Inácio de Souza.)	8.1227°S 35.2832°W	10,911

== Format ==
- In the first stage Afogados, América, Atlético Pernambucano, Belo Jardim, Central, Flamengo de Arcoverde, Salgueiro, Serra Talhada, and Vitória das Tabocas were drawn into three groups of three teams each, with each team playing once against the six clubs from the other two groups. After each team had played six matches, the top three teams qualified for the second stage. The six teams which finished fourth to ninth proceeded to the Relegation stage.
- The Relegation stage group played a round-robin format. After the completion of the stage, the two clubs with the lowest number of points were relegated to the 2018 Campeonato Pernambucano A2.
- Santa Cruz, Sport and Náutico were qualified directly for the second stage. The second stage group played a round-robin format. After the completion of the stage, the top four teams advanced to the Semi-finals.
- Semi-finals and Finals were played on a home-and-away two-legged basis with the best placed team hosting the second leg.

=== Tiebreakers ===
The teams were ranked according to points (3 points for a win, 1 point for a draw, 0 points for a loss). If two or more teams were equal on points on completion of the group matches, the following criteria would be applied to determine the rankings:

1. Higher number of wins;
2. Superior goal difference;
3. Higher number of goals scored;
4. Head-to-head result between tied teams;
5. Fewest red cards received;
6. Fewest yellow cards received;
7. Draw in the headquarters of the Federação Pernambucana de Futebol.

== First stage ==
=== Group A ===
Pos	Team	Pld	W	D	L	GF	GA	GD	Pts	Qualification
1	Salgueiro	6	5	1	0	11	3	+8	16	Second stage
2	Belo Jardim	6	4	0	2	8	4	+4	12	Second stage
3	Atlético Pernambucano	6	0	3	3	3	7	−4	3	Relegation stage

Source: Standings

=== Group B ===
Pos	Team	Pld	W	D	L	GF	GA	GD	Pts	Qualification
1	Flamengo de Arcoverde	6	2	3	1	5	4	+1	9	Relegation stage
2	Serra Talhada	6	1	2	3	5	8	−3	5	Relegation stage
3	América	6	1	1	4	4	11	−7	4	Relegation stage

Source: Standings

=== Group C ===
Pos	Team	Pld	W	D	L	GF	GA	GD	Pts	Qualification
1	Central	6	3	3	0	6	1	+5	12	Second stage
2	Vitória das Tabocas	6	2	2	2	5	5	0	8	Relegation stage
3	Afogados	6	0	3	3	2	6	−4	3	Relegation stage

Source: Standings

=== First Stage Standings ===
Pos	Team	Pld	W	D	L	GF	GA	GD	Pts	Qualification
1	Salgueiro	6	5	1	0	11	3	+8	16	Second stage
2	Belo Jardim	6	4	0	2	8	4	+4	12	Second stage and 2018 Série D
3	Central	6	3	3	0	6	1	+5	12	Second stage and 2018 Série D
4	Flamengo de Arcoverde	6	2	3	1	5	4	+1	9	Relegation stage
5	Vitória das Tabocas	6	2	2	2	5	5	0	8	Relegation stage
6	Serra Talhada	6	1	2	3	5	8	−3	5	Relegation stage
7	América	6	1	1	4	4	11	−7	4	Relegation stage
8	Atlético Pernambucano	6	0	3	3	3	7	−4	3	Relegation stage
9	Afogados	6	0	3	3	2	6	−4	3	Relegation stage

Source: Standings

== Relegation stage ==
Pos	Team	Pld	W	D	L	GF	GA	GD	Pts	Qualification	FLA	AFO	AME	VIT	SER	ATL
1	Flamengo de Arcoverde	10	5	2	3	19	14	+5	17	2018 Série D		2–2	0–1	0–1	3–2	1–0
2	Afogados	10	4	5	1	16	11	+5	17		1–3		2–1	2–2	2–2	5–1
3	América	10	5	1	4	11	9	+2	16		1–2	0–1		1–0	1–2	1–0
4	Vitória das Tabocas	10	4	4	2	11	6	+5	16		3–1	0–0	1–1		0–1	3–0
5	Serra Talhada	10	4	4	2	12	9	+3	16	Relegation to Pernambucano A2	1–1	0–0	0–1	0–0		2–0
6	Atlético Pernambucano	10	0	0	10	5	25	−20	0	Relegation to Pernambucano A2	2–6	0–1	1–3	0–1	1–2	

Source: globoesporte.globo.com and HEXAGONAL - PERMANÊNCIA

== Second stage ==
Pos	Team	Pld	W	D	L	GF	GA	GD	Pts	Qualification	SAL	NAU	SPO	SAN	BEL	CEN
1	Salgueiro	10	7	2	1	17	6	+11	23	Play-offs		2–0	0–0	0–1	3–1	2–1
2	Náutico	10	5	3	2	15	9	+6	18	Play-offs	0–2		2–1	1–1	1–1	5–0
3	Sport	10	4	5	1	14	8	+6	17	Play-offs	2–2	1–1		1–1	1–0	3–0
4	Santa Cruz	10	4	4	2	19	10	+9	16	Play-offs	1–2	1–2	1–1		0–0	5–1
5	Belo Jardim	10	1	2	7	5	18	−13	5		0–2	0–2	0–1	0–4		1–4
6	Central	10	1	0	9	9	28	−19	3		0–2	0–1	1–3	2–4	0–2	

Source: globoesporte.globo.com and HEXAGONAL - TÍTULO

== Play-offs ==
In the Play-offs stages, each tie was played on a home-and-away two-legged basis. If tied on aggregate, away goals rule would not be used, extra time would not be played and penalty shoot-out would determine the winner. In the Third place matches and the Final, the second leg was hosted by the teams with a higher overall points.

Semi-finals
3	Sport	3	1	4
2	Náutico	2	1	3
4	Santa Cruz	1	0	1
1	Salgueiro	0	2	2

Final
3	Sport	1	1	2
1	Salgueiro	1	0	1
Third Place
2	Náutico	1	1	2
4	Santa Cruz	2	1	3

=== Semi-finals ===
==== Semi-final 1 ====
15 April 2017
18:30

Santa Cruz	1–0	Salgueiro
Anderson Salles 58' (pen.)	Report

Estádio do Arruda, Recife
Attendance: 22,056
Referee: Deborah Cecília Cruz Correia

22 April 2017
19:00

Salgueiro	2–0	Santa Cruz
Rodolfo Potiguar 66'; Jean Carlos 70'	Report

Estádio Cornélio de Barros, Salgueiro
Attendance: 5,184
Referee: José Woshington da Silva

Salgueiro won 2–1 on aggregate and advanced to the Final.
Salgueiro qualifies to the 2018 Copa do Brasil and 2018 Copa do Nordeste.

==== Semi-final 2 ====
16 April 2017
16:00

Sport	3–2	Náutico
Diego Souza 51'; Juninho 89', 90+1'	Report	Marco Antônio 44'; Anselmo 64'

Estádio Ilha do Retiro, Recife
Attendance: 15,082
Referee: Wagner do Nascimento Magalhães (Rio de Janeiro)

23 April 2017
16:00

Náutico	1–1	Sport
Giovanni 31'	Report	Matheus Ferraz 33'

Arena Pernambuco, São Lourenço da Mata
Attendance: 19,541
Referee: Anderson Daronco (Rio Grande do Sul)

Sport won 4–3 on aggregate and advanced to the Final.
Sport qualifies to the 2018 Copa do Brasil. They declined to participate in the 2018 Copa do Nordeste.

=== Third place matches ===
==== Host team ====
Pos	Team	Pld	W	D	L	GF	GA	GD	Pts
1	Santa Cruz (Second leg)	12	5	4	3	20	12	+8	19
2	Náutico (First leg)	12	5	4	3	18	13	+5	19

Source: FPF

==== Matches ====
6 May 2017
16:00

Náutico	1–2	Santa Cruz
Alison 77'	Report	André Luís 44'; Roberto 60'

Arena Pernambuco, São Lourenço da Mata
Attendance: 3,267
Referee: Deborah Cecília Cruz Correia

16 May 2017
20:00

Santa Cruz	1–1	Náutico
Éverton Santos 45+2'	Report	Anselmo 84'

Estádio do Arruda, Recife
Attendance: 3,387
Referee: Luiz Cláudio Sobral

Santa Cruz won 3–2 on aggregate.
Santa Cruz qualifies to the 2018 Copa do Brasil and 2018 Copa do Nordeste.
Sport were replaced by Náutico in the 2018 Copa do Nordeste.

=== Final ===
==== Host team ====
Pos	Team	Pld	W	D	L	GF	GA	GD	Pts
1	Salgueiro (Second leg)	12	8	2	2	19	7	+12	26
2	Sport (First leg)	12	5	6	1	18	11	+7	21

Source: FPF

==== Matches ====
7 May 2017
16:00

Sport	1–1	Salgueiro
André 27'	Report	Jean Carlos 90+10' (pen.)

Estádio Ilha do Retiro, Recife
Attendance: 22,757
Referee: José Woshington da Silva

28 June 2017^{[a]}
21:45

Salgueiro	0–1	Sport
	Report	Everton Felipe 81'

Estádio Cornélio de Barros, Salgueiro
Attendance: 5,544
Referee: Wilton Sampaio (Goiás)

The Salgueiro v Sport match was originally scheduled on 18 June 2017, 16:00 local time, but was re-scheduled to 28 June 2017, 21:45 local time.

2017 Campeonato Pernambucano Champions
(Recife)
Sport
41st title

== Top goalscorers ==
Rank	Player	Team	Goals
1	Caxito	Afogados	9
2	Éverton Santos	Santa Cruz	6
2	Robinho	Flamengo de Arcoverde	6
4	Anselmo	Náutico	5
5	Anderson Salles	Santa Cruz	4
5	Edson Pitbull	Serra Talhada	4
5	Erick	Náutico	4
5	Marco Antônio	Náutico	4
5	Valdeir	Salgueiro	4

Note: Goals scored in the first stage are not counted when determining top scorer.
Source: FPF
