= 2016 Campeonato Pernambucano =

Campeonato Pernambucano
- Season: 2016
- Champions: Santa Cruz (29th title)
- Relegated: Pesqueira; Porto
- 2017 Copa do Brasil: Santa Cruz (via Copa do Nordeste); Náutico; Salgueiro; Sport
- 2017 Copa do Nordeste: Náutico; Santa Cruz; Sport
- 2016 Série D: América; Central; Serra Talhada
- 2017 Série D: América; Atlético Pernambucano; Central
- Matches: 92
- Goals: 187 (2.03 per match)
- Top goalscorer: Ronaldo Alves (6 goals)

The 2016 Campeonato Pernambucano (officially the 2016 Campeonato Pernambucano Celpe A1 for sponsorship reasons) was the 102nd edition of the state championship of Pernambuco. The championship began on January 10 and ended on May 8. Twelve teams were competing, ten returning from the 2015 and two promoted from the 2015 Pernambucano U-23 Championship (Belo Jardim and Vitória das Tabocas). Santa Cruz, the defending champions, won the finals against Sport 1–0 on aggregate.

== Teams ==
Club	City	Stadium	Capacity
América	Recife	Ademir Cunha (Paulista)	12,000
Atlético Pernambucano	Carpina	Paulo Petribú	3,500
Belo Jardim	Belo Jardim	José Bezerra de Mendonça	7,050
Central	Caruaru	Lacerdão	19,478
Náutico	Recife	Arena Pernambuco (São Lourenço da Mata)	44,300
Pesqueira	Pesqueira	Joaquim de Britto	1,800
Porto	Caruaru	Antônio Inácio de Souza	6,000
Salgueiro	Salgueiro	Cornélio de Barros	12,070
Santa Cruz	Recife	Estádio do Arruda	60,044
Serra Talhada	Serra Talhada	Nildo Pereira de Menezes	5,000
Sport	Recife	Estádio Ilha do Retiro	32,983
Vitória das Tabocas	Vitória de Santo Antão	Severino Cândido Carneiro	10,911

== Tiebreakers ==
The teams are ranked according to points (3 points for a win, 1 point for a draw, 0 points for a loss). If two or more teams are equal on points on completion of the group matches, the following criteria are applied to determine the rankings:

1. Higher number of wins;
2. Superior goal difference;
3. Head-to-head result between tied teams;
4. Higher number of away wins;
5. Fewest home losses;
6. Draw in the headquarters of the Federação Pernambucana de Futebol.

== First stage ==
=== Group A ===
Pos	Team	Pld	W	D	L	GF	GA	GD	Pts	Qualification
1	Central	6	4	1	1	8	3	+5	13	Second stage, 2016 Série D and 2017 Série D
2	Atlético Pernambucano	6	2	3	1	4	3	+1	9	2017 Série D
3	Porto	6	2	2	2	5	6	−1	8	Relegation stage
4	Belo Jardim	6	0	2	4	3	8	−5	2	Relegation stage

Source: Standings

=== Group B ===
Pos	Team	Pld	W	D	L	GF	GA	GD	Pts	Qualification
1	América	6	3	3	0	8	5	+3	12	Second stage, 2016 Série D and 2017 Série D
2	Serra Talhada	6	2	3	1	6	5	+1	9	Relegation stage, 2016 Série D
3	Vitória das Tabocas	6	1	2	3	6	7	−1	5	Relegation stage
4	Pesqueira	6	1	2	3	4	7	−3	5	Relegation stage

Source: Standings

Central, América and Serra Talhada qualified for 2016 Série D and 2017 Série D. Serra Talhada played the 2016 Série D but they declined to participate in the 2017 Série D. Their berth was used by Group A runners-up Atlético Pernambucano.

== Relegation stage ==
Pos	Team	Pld	W	D	L	GF	GA	GD	Pts	Qualification
1	Atlético Pernambucano	10	6	2	2	15	10	+5	20	
2	Serra Talhada	10	4	3	3	13	11	+2	15	
3	Belo Jardim	10	3	3	4	10	9	+1	12	
4	Vitória das Tabocas	10	2	6	2	11	13	−2	12	
5	Porto	10	2	5	3	6	8	−2	11	Relegation to Pernambucano A2
6	Pesqueira	10	1	5	4	7	11	−4	8	Relegation to Pernambucano A2

Source: Standings

== Second stage ==
Pos	Team	Pld	W	D	L	GF	GA	GD	Pts	Qualification
1	Náutico	10	7	2	1	18	4	+14	23	Play-offs
2	Salgueiro	10	6	2	2	13	5	+8	20	Play-offs
3	Sport	10	5	2	3	16	7	+9	17	Play-offs
4	Santa Cruz	10	2	5	3	9	12	−3	11	Play-offs
5	América	10	2	1	7	7	23	−16	7	
6	Central	10	1	2	7	4	16	−12	5	

Source: Standings

== Play-offs ==
Semifinals
4	Santa Cruz	3	2	5
1	Náutico	1	1	2
3	Sport (p)	1	0	1 (5)
2	Salgueiro	0	1	1 (4)

Final
4	Santa Cruz	1	0	1
3	Sport	0	0	0
Third and Fourth
2	Salgueiro	0	0	0
1	Náutico	1	3	4

=== Semifinals ===
==== Semifinal 1 ====
20 April 2016
21:45

Santa Cruz	3–1	Náutico
Arthur 9', 52'; Tiago Costa 69'	Report	Joazi 87'

Estádio do Arruda, Recife
Attendance: 39,999
Referee: Sebastião Rufino Ribeiro Filho

24 April 2016
16:00

Náutico	1–2	Santa Cruz
Ronaldo Alves 33'	Report	Grafite 51'; Lelê 90+2'

Arena Pernambuco, São Lourenço da Mata
Attendance: 15,596
Referee: Emerson Luiz Sobral

Santa Cruz won 5–2 on aggregate and advanced to the Finals.
Santa Cruz qualified for 2017 Copa do Brasil and 2017 Copa do Nordeste.

==== Semifinal 2 ====
21 April 2016
16:00

Sport	1–0	Salgueiro
Vinícius Araújo 13'	Report

Estádio Ilha do Retiro, Recife
Attendance: 16,699
Referee: Tiago Nascimento dos Santos

24 April 2016
16:00

Salgueiro	1–0	Sport
Moreilândia 8'	Report
Penalties
Marcos Tamandaré (penalty missed); Rogério Paraíba (penalty scored); Nilson (penalty scored); Ranieri (penalty scored); Rodolfo Potiguar (penalty scored); Toty (penalty missed)	4–5	(penalty scored) Durval; (penalty scored) Luiz Antônio; (penalty missed) Gabriel Xavier; (penalty scored) Everton Felipe; (penalty scored) Mark González; (penalty scored) Samuel Xavier

Estádio Cornélio de Barros, Salgueiro
Attendance: 4,184
Referee: Gleydson Ferreira Leite

Tied 1–1 on aggregate, Sport won on penalties and advanced to the Finals.
Sport qualified for 2017 Copa do Brasil and 2017 Copa do Nordeste.

=== Third place matches ===
4 May 2016
19:30

Salgueiro	0–1	Náutico
	Report	Rony 49'

Estádio Cornélio de Barros, Salgueiro
Attendance: 2,442
Referee: Gleydson Ferreira Leite

7 May 2016
18:30

Náutico	3–0	Salgueiro
Rafael Coelho 14'; Rony 53'; Jefferson Nem 81'	Report

Arena Pernambuco, São Lourenço da Mata
Attendance: 1,827
Referee: Gilberto Rodrigues Castro Júnior

Náutico won 4–0 on aggregate.
Náutico qualified for 2017 Copa do Brasil and 2017 Copa do Nordeste.
Since Santa Cruz qualified for 2017 Copa do Brasil round of 16 as 2016 Copa do Nordeste champions, Salgueiro also qualified for 2017 Copa do Brasil.

=== Finals ===
4 May 2016
21:45

Santa Cruz	1–0	Sport
Lelê 31'	Report

Estádio do Arruda, Recife
Attendance: 30,163
Referee: Emerson Luiz Sobral

8 May 2016
16:00

Sport	0–0	Santa Cruz
	Report

Estádio Ilha do Retiro, Recife
Attendance: 27,493
Referee: Sebastião Rufino Ribeiro Filho

2016 Campeonato Pernambucano
Champions

Santa Cruz
29th title
