= Cesinha (footballer, born 1992) =

Brazilian footballer

Personal information
- Full name: César Velez da Silva
- Date of birth: 21 July 1992 (age 34)
- Place of birth: Brazil
- Position: Forward

Team information
- Current team: Phitsanulok

Youth career
- Comercial

Senior career*
Years	Team	Apps	(Gls)
2014–2015	Vera Cruz	0	(0)
2015	Uniclinic		
2015	Vitória das Tabocas	0	(0)
2016	América-PE	0	(0)
2016	Afogados	0	(0)
2017	Auto Esporte	0	(0)
2017–2018	Atlético Pernambucano	6	(5)
2018	Nacional Atlético Clube	0	(0)
2018	Itabaiana	4	(0)
2019–2020	Perilima	0	(0)
2019	→ Treze (loan)	14	(0)
2020–2021	Imperatriz	13	(1)
2021	Salgueiro	7	(2)
2021–2022	Ferroviário	0	(0)
2022	Altos	13	(1)
2022	UR Trabalhadores	0	(0)
2022	Alagoinhas Atlético	10	(2)
2022–2023	Central	0	(0)
2023	Campinense	0	(0)
2023	Democrata	0	(0)
2023	Fluminense de Feira	0	(0)
2023	Decisão	0	(0)
2023–2024	Barcelona-BA	0	(0)
2024	ASA	3	(0)
2024–2025	Kercem Ajax	0	(0)
2025	Falcon	0	(0)
2025–2026	Belo Jardim	0	(0)
2026	Porto	10	(3)
2026	Central	1	(0)
2026–	Phitsanulok	0	(0)
- * Club domestic league appearances and goals as of 14:28, 5 May 2019 (UTC)

César Velez da Silva (born 21 July 1992), commonly known as Cesinha, is a Brazilian footballer who currently plays as a forward for Phitsanulok.

== Club career ==
Cesinha started his career with amateur sides in Recife, before signing with Vera Cruz in 2014. In his first season with the Vitória de Santo Antão-based club, he was their leading scorer at under-23 level. He left in 2015 to join Uniclinic, where he went by the name Cezinha.

He joined Vitória das Tabocas later the same year, but only managed 2 appearances in the second tier of the Campeonato Pernambucano, scoring once. He moved on to América Futebol Clube in Pernambuco ahead of the 2016 season, which he finished as the club's top scorer with three goals.

Later in 2016, he joined Afogados da Ingazeira, where he scored four goals in the second tier of the Campeonato Pernambucano before joining Auto Esporte, with whom he had signed a pre-contract deal.

After 2 goals in 8 games for O Clube do Povo, Cesinha joined Atlético Pernambucano ahead of the 2017 Campeonato Brasileiro Série D. He scored in his first three games, and netted two in his fourth, in a 2–2 draw with Itabaiana.

== Career statistics ==
=== Club ===
As of 28 March 2019.

Club	Season	League			State League		Cup		Continental		Other		Total	
Club	Season	Division	Apps	Goals	Apps	Goals	Apps	Goals	Apps	Goals	Apps	Goals	Apps	Goals
Vera Cruz	2014	–			6 (Note: Appearances in Campeonato Pernambucano)	2	0	0	–		0	0	6	2
Vera Cruz	2015	–			17	2	0	0	–		0	0	17	2
Vitória das Tabocas	2015	–			2 (Note: Appearances in Campeonato Pernambucano 2ªD)	1	0	0	–		0	0	2	1
América-PE	2016	Série D	0	0	9	3	0	0	–		0	0	9	3
Afogados	2016	–			7	4	0	0	–		0	0	7	4
Auto Esporte	2017	–			8 (Note: Appearances in Campeonato Paraibano)	2	0	0	–		0	0	8	2
Atlético Pernambucano	2017	Série D	6	5	0	0	0	0	–		0	0	6	5
Nacional Atlético Clube	2018	–			13	4	0	0	–		0	0	13	4
Itabaiana	2018	Série D	4	0	0	0	0	0	–		0	0	4	0
Perilima	2018	–			7 (Note: Appearances in Campeonato Paraibano A2)	4	0	0	–		0	0	7	4
Perilima	2019	–			7	0	0	0	–		0	0	7	0
Perilima	Total		0	0	14	4	0	0	0	0	0	0	14	4
Treze (loan)	2019	Série C	0	0	0	0	0	0	–		0	0	0	0
Career total			10	5	76	22	0	0	0	0	0	0	86	27
