= 2018 Campeonato Pernambucano =

Campeonato Pernambucano
- Season: 2018
- Champions: Náutico (22nd title)
- Relegated: Belo Jardim; Pesqueira
- 2019 Copa do Brasil: Central; Náutico; Sport; Santa Cruz (via RNC)
- 2019 Copa do Nordeste: Náutico; Santa Cruz (via RNC)
- 2019 Pré-Copa do Nordeste: Salgueiro (via RNC)
- 2019 Série D: América; Central; Vitória das Tabocas
- Matches played: 64
- Goals scored: 145 (2.27 per match)
- Best Player: José Ortigoza
- Top goalscorer: Caxito (8 goals)
- Total attendance: 217,496 (3,398 per match)

The 2018 Campeonato Pernambucano (officially the Pernambucano da Série A1 de 2018) was the 104th edition of the state championship of Pernambuco organized by FPF. The championship began on 17 January and ended on 8 April. Sport were the defending champions, but were eliminated by Central in the semi-finals.

Náutico defeated Central 2–1 on aggregate to win their 22nd Campeonato Pernambucano title, the first one since 2004. As champions, Náutico qualified for the 2019 Copa do Brasil and 2019 Copa do Nordeste.

Central and Sport qualified for 2019 Copa do Brasil as runners-up and third placed team, respectively.

Sport declined to participate in the 2019 Copa do Nordeste. They were replaced by Santa Cruz (best second-team in the 2018 RNC). Salgueiro qualified for 2019 Pré-Copa do Nordeste via RNC.

== Teams ==
Eleven teams were competing, ten returning from the 2017 and one promoted from the 2017 Pernambucano A2 Championship (Pesqueira).

| Club | City | Stadium | Coordinates | Capacity |
|---|---|---|---|---|
| Afogados | Afogados da Ingazeira | Valdemar Viana de Araújo | 7.7585°S 37.6334°W | 1,735 |
| América | Recife | Ademir Cunha (Paulista) | 7.9459°S 34.8904°W | 12,000 |
| Belo Jardim | Belo Jardim | José Bezerra de Mendonça^{[1]} | 8.3437°S 36.4469°W | 7,050 |
| Central | Caruaru | Lacerdão | 8.2786°S 35.9752°W | 19,478 |
| Flamengo de Arcoverde | Arcoverde | Áureo Bradley | 8.4199°S 37.0583°W | 3,000 |
| Náutico | Recife | Arena Pernambuco (São Lourenço da Mata) | 8.0406°S 35.0104°W | 44,300 |
| Pesqueira | Pesqueira | Joaquim de Britto | 8.3554°S 36.6899°W | 1,800 |
| Salgueiro | Salgueiro | Cornélio de Barros | 8.0761°S 39.1194°W | 12,070 |
| Santa Cruz | Recife | Arruda | 8.0267°S 34.8933°W | 60,044 |
| Sport | Recife | Ilha do Retiro | 8.0629°S 34.9051°W | 32,983 |
| Vitória das Tabocas | Vitória de Santo Antão | Arena Pernambuco (São Lourenço da Mata)^{[2]} | 8.0406°S 35.0104°W | 44,300 |

^{1} Belo Jardim played their home matches against Flamengo de Arcoverde (Jan. 21), Salgueiro (Jan. 28) and Vitória das Tabocas (Feb. 7) at Estádio Joaquim de Britto, and against Sport (Feb. 21) at Lacerdão.
^{2} Vitória das Tabocas played their home matches at Arena Pernambuco instead of their regular stadium Severino Cândido Carneiro, Vitória de Santo Antão.

== Schedule ==
The schedule of the competition was as follows.

First Stage
| Round 1: | 17–19 January 2018 | |
| Round 2: | 20–21 January 2018 | |
| Round 3: | 24–25 January 2018 | |
| Round 4: | 28–29 January 2018 | |
| Round 5: | 3–4 February 2018 | |
| Round 6: | 6–7 and 14 February 2018 | |
| Round 7: | 17–18 February 2018 | |
| Round 8: | 20–21 February and 1 March 2018 | |
| Round 9: | 24–27 February 2018 | |
| Round 10: | 4 March 2018 | |
| Round 11: | 7 March 2018 | |
Final Stages
| Quarter-finals | 14 and 18 March 2018 | |
| Semi-finals | 21 and 25 March 2018 | |
| Third place match | 2 April 2018 | |
| | First leg | Second leg |
| Finals | 1 April 2018 | 8 April 2018 |

== First stage ==
In the first stage, each team played the other 10 teams in a single round-robin tournament. The teams were ranked according to points (3 points for a win, 1 point for a draw, and 0 points for a loss). If tied on points, the following criteria would be used to determine the ranking: 1. Wins; 2. Goal difference; 3. Goals scored; 4. Head-to-head; 5. Fewest red cards; 6. Fewest yellow cards; 7. Draw in the headquarters of the FPF.

Top eight teams advanced to the quarter-finals of the final stages. The two teams with the lowest number of points were relegated to the 2019 Campeonato Pernambucano A2. Top three teams not already qualified for 2019 Série A, Série B or Série C qualified for 2019 Série D.

=== Standings ===
| Pos | Team | Pld | W | D | L | GF | GA | GD | Pts | Qualification or relegation |
|---|---|---|---|---|---|---|---|---|---|---|
| 1 | Náutico | 10 | 5 | 4 | 1 | 17 | 10 | +7 | 19 | Advance to final stages |
| 2 | Central | 10 | 5 | 4 | 1 | 13 | 6 | +7 | 19 | Advance to final stages and qualify for Série D |
| 3 | Sport | 10 | 4 | 5 | 1 | 13 | 6 | +7 | 17 | Advance to final stages |
| 4 | Salgueiro | 10 | 3 | 5 | 2 | 9 | 11 | −2 | 14 | Advance to final stages |
| 5 | Vitória das Tabocas | 10 | 3 | 4 | 3 | 14 | 17 | −3 | 13 | Advance to final stages and qualify for Série D |
| 6 | Santa Cruz | 10 | 2 | 7 | 1 | 9 | 9 | 0 | 13 | Advance to final stages |
| 7 | América | 10 | 3 | 3 | 4 | 15 | 16 | −1 | 12 | Advance to final stages and qualify for Série D |
| 8 | Afogados | 10 | 3 | 3 | 4 | 12 | 13 | −1 | 12 | Advance to final stages |
| 9 | Flamengo de Arcoverde | 10 | 1 | 6 | 3 | 7 | 8 | −1 | 9 | |
| 10 | Pesqueira | 10 | 1 | 3 | 6 | 5 | 12 | −7 | 6 | Relegation to Pernambucano A2 |
| 11 | Belo Jardim | 10 | 0 | 6 | 4 | 9 | 15 | −6 | 6 | Relegation to Pernambucano A2 |

Source: FPF

=== Results ===
| Home \ Away | AFO | AME | BEL | CEN | FLA | NAU | PES | SAL | SAN | SPO | VIT |
|---|---|---|---|---|---|---|---|---|---|---|---|
| Afogados | | | 1–1 | 1–1 | | | 2–1 | | 0–1 | | 4–2 |
| América | 2–2 | | 3–1 | 0–1 | | | 2–0 | | 2–0 | | |
| Belo Jardim | | | | | 1–1 | 2–2 | | 0–1 | | 0–0 | 2–2 |
| Central | | | 2–0 | | 0–0 | 3–0 | | 2–1 | | 1–1 | |
| Flamengo de Arcoverde | 0–1 | 1–1 | | | | | 0–1 | | 1–1 | 0–0 | |
| Náutico | 2–1 | 3–2 | | | 1–0 | | | 4–0 | | 3–0 | |
| Pesqueira | | | 0–0 | 1–2 | | 1–1 | | 0–1 | | | 1–2 |
| Salgueiro | 1–0 | 1–1 | | | 2–2 | | | | 1–1 | 1–1 | |
| Santa Cruz | | | 3–2 | 1–1 | | 0–0 | 0–0 | | | | 1–1 |
| Sport | 2–0 | 2–0 | | | | | 2–0 | | 1–1 | | 4–0 |
| Vitória das Tabocas | | 5–2 | | 1–0 | 0–2 | 1–1 | | 0–0 | | | |

Source: FPF
Legend: Blue = home team win; Yellow = draw; Red = away team win.

== Final stages ==
Starting from the quarter-finals, the teams played a single-elimination tournament with the following rules:

- Quarter-finals, semi-finals and third place match were played on a single-leg basis, with the higher-seeded team hosting the leg.
  - If tied, the penalty shoot-out would be used to determine the winner.
- Finals were played on a home-and-away two-legged basis, with the higher-seeded team hosting the second leg.
  - If tied on aggregate, the penalty shoot-out would be used to determine the winner.
- Extra time was not played and away goals rule was not used in final stages.

=== Bracket ===
Quarter-finals
2 | Central | 3
7 | América | 2
3 | Sport | 3
6 | Santa Cruz | 0
1 | Náutico | 1
8 | Afogados | 0
4 | Salgueiro | 1
5 | Vitória das Tabocas | 0

Semi-finals
2 | Central | 1
3 | Sport | 0
1 | Náutico | 3
4 | Salgueiro | 2

Finals
2 | Central | 0 | 1 | 1
1 | Náutico | 0 | 2 | 2
Third place
3 | Sport | 3
4 | Salgueiro | 0

=== Quarter-finals ===
| Team 1 | Score | Team 2 |
|---|---|---|
| Náutico | 1–0 | Afogados |
| Central | 3–2 | América |
| Sport | 3–0 | Santa Cruz |
| Salgueiro | 1–0 | Vitória das Tabocas |

==== Matches ====
18 March 2018
16:00

| Náutico | 1–0 | Afogados |
|---|---|---|
| Júnior Timbó 67' (pen.) | Report |

Arena Pernambuco, São Lourenço da Mata
Attendance: 18,136
Referee: Gilberto Rodrigues Castro Júnior

14 March 2018
20:00

| Central | 3–2 | América |
|---|---|---|
| Kady 3' (o.g.); Fernando Pires 22'; Eduardo Erê 45' | Report | Caxito 78' (pen.); Kady 81' |

Lacerdão, Caruaru
Attendance: 2,525
Referee: Péricles Bassols Pegado Cortez

14 March 2018
21:45

| Sport | 3–0 | Santa Cruz |
|---|---|---|
| Marlone 1'; Anselmo 42', 70' | Report |

Estádio Ilha do Retiro, Recife
Attendance: 15,180
Referee: Nielson Nogueira Dias

14 March 2018
20:00

| Salgueiro | 1–0 | Vitória das Tabocas |
|---|---|---|
| Dadá Belmonte 57' | Report |

Estádio Cornélio de Barros, Salgueiro
Attendance: 1,347
Referee: Luiz Cláudio Sobral

=== Semi-finals ===
| Team 1 | Score | Team 2 |
|---|---|---|
| Náutico | 3–2 | Salgueiro |
| Central | 1–0 | Sport |

==== Matches ====
25 March 2018
16:00

| Náutico | 3–2 | Salgueiro |
|---|---|---|
| Luís Eduardo 41' (o.g.); Ortigoza 63'; Camacho 90' | Report | Dadá Belmonte 23' (pen.); Maurício 90+2' |

Arena Pernambuco, São Lourenço da Mata
Attendance: 20,446
Referee: Tiago Nascimento dos Santos

Náutico qualified for the 2019 Copa do Brasil.

21 March 2018
21:45

| Central | 1–0 | Sport |
|---|---|---|
| Leandro Costa 58' | Report |

Lacerdão, Caruaru
Attendance: 8,530
Referee: Ricardo Marques (Minas Gerais)

Central qualified for the 2019 Copa do Brasil.

=== Third place match ===
2 April 2018
20:00

| Sport | 3–0 | Salgueiro |
|---|---|---|
| Pablo Pardal 53', 78'; Léo Ortiz 74' | Report |

Estádio Ilha do Retiro, Recife
Attendance: 932
Referee: Luiz Cláudio Sobral

Sport qualified for the 2019 Copa do Brasil.

=== Finals ===
| Team 1 | Agg. | Team 2 | 1st leg | 2nd leg |
|---|---|---|---|---|
| Central | 1–2 | Náutico | 0–0 | 1–2 |

==== Matches ====
1 April 2018
16:00

| Central | 0–0 | Náutico |
|---|---|---|
| | Report |

Lacerdão, Caruaru
Attendance: 14,080
Referee: Péricles Bassols Pegado Cortez

8 April 2018
16:00

| Náutico | 2–1 | Central |
|---|---|---|
| Ortigoza 43'; Jobson 57' | Report | Leandro Costa 71' (pen.) |

Arena Pernambuco, São Lourenço da Mata
Attendance: 42,352
Referee: Nielson Nogueira Dias

Náutico won 2–1 on aggregate and qualified for the 2019 Copa do Nordeste.

2018 Campeonato Pernambucano Champions
(Recife)
Náutico
22nd title

== Top goalscorers ==
| Rank | Player | Team | Goals |
|---|---|---|---|
| 1 | Caxito | América | 8 |
| 2 | Leandro Costa | Central | 7 |
| 3 | Thomas Anderson | Vitória das Tabocas | 6 |
| 4 | Etinho | Afogados | 5 |
| 5 | Anselmo | Sport | 4 |
| 5 | Jader | Belo Jardim | 4 |
| 5 | Marlone | Sport | 4 |
| 5 | José Ortigoza | Náutico | 4 |
| 5 | Piauí | Salgueiro | 4 |
| 5 | Wallace Pernambucano | Náutico | 4 |

Source:FPF

== 2018 Campeonato Pernambucano team ==
The 2018 Campeonato Pernambucano team was a squad consisting of the eleven most impressive players at the tournament.

| Pos. | Player | Team |
|---|---|---|
| GK | Bruno | Náutico |
| DF | Thiago Ennes | Náutico |
| DF | Vitão | Central |
| DF | Camacho | Náutico |
| DF | Charles | Central |
| MF | Anselmo | Sport |
| MF | Douglas Carioca | Central |
| MF | Júnior Lemos | Central |
| FW | Leandro Costa | Central |
| FW | José Ortigoza ^{a} | Náutico |
| FW | Caxito ^{b} | América |
| Head coach | Roberto Fernandes | Náutico |

a. Best player
b. Top scorer

Head coach
(Brazil) Roberto Fernandes

Source:Globo
