= Caxito (footballer) =

Brazilian footballer

Personal information
- Full name: Jefferson Luiz da Silva Caetano
- Date of birth: 18 August 1991 (age 35)
- Place of birth: Recife, Brazil
- Height: 1.84 m (6 ft 0 in)
- Position: Forward

Team information
- Current team: Central

Youth career
- Sport Recife

Senior career*
Years	Team	Apps	(Gls)
2012	Tiradentes-CE	2	(1)
2012	Quixadá		
2013	Porto-PE	1	(0)
2014	Serra Talhada	22	(2)
2014–2015	Afogados		(9)
2016	Serra Talhada	15	(1)
2017	Afogados	13	(9)
2017	Penapolense	4	(0)
2018	América-PE	11	(8)
2018	Confiança	13	(0)
2019	Joinville	9	(0)
2019	Ferroviário	16	(4)
2020	Treze	15	(0)
2020–2021	Ferroviário	2	(0)
2021	América de Natal	9	(2)
2022	Inter de Limeira	12	(2)
2022	Central	12	(3)
2023	Iguatu	22	(5)
2023	Anapolina	5	(1)
2024	ASA	2	(1)
2024	Real Noroeste	12	(1)
2024	Cabense	3	(0)
2025	Real Noroeste	10	(4)
2025	Picos	5	(0)
2026	Portuguesa Santista	12	(1)
2026	Bonsucesso	9	(1)
2026–	Central	4	(2)
- * Club domestic league appearances and goals as of 17:01, 11 November 2026 (UTC)

Jeferson Luiz da Silva Caetano (born 18 August 1991), commonly known as Caxito, is a Brazilian footballer who plays as a forward for Central.

In a journeyman career, he played in the championships of nine states, winning the Campeonato Paraibano with Treze in 2020, the Campeonato Pernambucano Série A2 with Central in 2022,and the Campeonato Paulista Série A3 with Portuguesa Santista in 2026.

He was the top scorer of the Campeonato Pernambucano in 2017 and 2018, respectively for Afogados and América-PE. He did not play in a national league until his Campeonato Brasileiro Série C debut for Confiança in 2018, aged 26.

== Career ==
=== Early career ===
Born in Recife in the state of Pernambuco, Caxito played in the youth ranks of Sport Recife, but in 2011 was released after playing in the under-20 side. He went on to play for smaller clubs, and not until 2017 did he play a full year instead of the four months of a state championship; he assisted his father as a bricklayer in the off-season.

=== Campeonato Pernambucano top scorer ===
Caxito scored the most goals of the Campeonato Pernambucano in 2017, with 9 for Afogados. However, the Federação Pernambucana de Futebol only recognised goals scored in the six-team finals series – which his team did not qualify for – and gave the official top scorer award to Éverton Santos who scored 5 times for Santa Cruz. Caxito's haul included a hat-trick on 8 February in a 5–1 home win over Atlético-PE. After his feat, the 25-year-old transferred to Penapolense in the Campeonato Paulista Série A2.

At the start of 2018, Caxito returned to his state of birth and signed for América-PE. He was again the league's top scorer, with 8 goals in 11 games; this included one on 15 March in the 3–2 quarter-final loss away to Central. In April, with the state league still not concluded, he signed for Confiança to compete for the first time in nationwide football in the Campeonato Brasileiro Série C.

=== Later career ===
For 2019, Caxito signed for Joinville in the Campeonato Catarinense. Having not scored in his 9 appearances, he ended his contract by mutual agreement and returned up north, joining Ferroviário-CE.

Caxito joined Treze in 2020, with the team set to compete in the Campeonato Paraibano and Série C of the national championship. His team won the former, though he scored no goals in his 10 appearances and did not play either leg of the final against city rivals Campinense.

After a brief return to Ferroviário, Caxito joined América de Natal in the Campeonato Potiguar in February 2021, and then Inter de Limeira in May, for the Campeonato Brasileiro Série D. In November 2022, he won the Campeonato Pernambucano Série A2 with Central.

Following spells at Iguatu, Anapolina and ASA (Campeonato Alagoano runners-up in 2024 with him unused in the final), Caxito joined Real Noroeste of Série D in 2024. He stayed for the Campeonato Capixaba at the start of the following year. In September 2025, he joined Picos in the Campeonato Piauiense Second Division.

At the start of 2026, Caxito returned to the Federação Paulista de Futebol's leagues for the first time in nine years, joining Portuguesa Santista in the Campeonato Paulista Série A3. He played 12 games but did not score until the final on 12 April, which his team won 2–0 against Marília. After spending the middle of the year with Bonsucesso in the Campeonato Carioca Série A2, he returned to his home state in September by signing for Central ahead of the new top-flight season.

== Honours ==
=== Club ===
Treze

- Campeonato Paraibano: 2020

Central

- Campeonato Pernambucano Série A2: 2022

Portuguesa Santista

- Campeonato Paulista Série A3: 2026

=== Individual ===
- Campeonato Pernambucano top scorer: 2017, 2018
