= Charles Barbosa =

Brazilian footballer (born 1997)

Personal information
- Full name: Jose Charles Pereira Barbosa
- Date of birth: 10 December 1997 (age 28)
- Height: 1.74 m (5 ft 9 in)
- Position: Forward

Team information
- Current team: Vera Cruz-PE (on loan from Retrô)

Youth career
- –2018: Afogados da Ingazeira

Senior career*
Years	Team	Apps	(Gls)
2018–2019	Afogados da Ingazeira	15	(1)
2018	→ Belo Jardim (loan)	2	(0)
2018	→ Ypiranga (loan)	4	(0)
2019	→ Retrô (loan)	11	(1)
2020–	Retrô	2	(1)
2020–	→ Vera Cruz-PE (loan)	6	(0)
- * Club domestic league appearances and goals as of 16:14, 6 August 2020 (UTC)

Jose Charles Pereira Barbosa (born 10 December 1997), commonly known as Charles Barbosa, is a Brazilian footballer who currently plays as a forward for Retrô.

== Career statistics ==
=== Club ===
As of 6 August 2020.

Club	Season	League			State League		Cup		Other		Total	
Club	Season	Division	Apps	Goals	Apps	Goals	Apps	Goals	Apps	Goals	Apps	Goals
Afogados da Ingazeira	2018	–			6 (Note: Appearances in the Campeonato Pernambucano)	0	0	0	0	0	6	0
Afogados da Ingazeira	2019	–			9	1	0	0	0	0	9	1
Afogados da Ingazeira	Total		0	0	15	1	0	0	0	0	15	1
Belo Jardim (loan)	2018	Série D	2	0	0	0	0	0	0	0	2	0
Ypiranga (loan)	2018	–			4 (Note: Appearances in the Campeonato Pernambucano Série A2)	0	0	0	0	0	4	0
Retrô (loan)	2019	–			11	1	0	0	0	0	11	1
Retrô	2020	–			2	1	0	0	0	0	2	1
Retrô	Total		0	0	13	2	0	0	0	0	13	2
Vera Cruz-PE (loan)	2020	–			6	0	0	0	0	0	6	0
Career total			2	0	38	3	0	0	0	0	40	3
