= 1972 Campeonato Brasileiro Série B =

Campeonato Brasileiro Série B
- Season: 1972
- Champions: Sampaio Corrêa
- Matches: 134
- Goals: 299 (2.23 per match)
- Top goalscorer: Pelezinho (Sampaio Corrêa) - 8 goals
- Biggest home win: Sampaio Corrêa 5-0 Flamengo-PI (October 29, 1972); Campinense 6-1 Calouros do Ar (November 12, 1972)
- Biggest away win: Moto Club 0-3 Fortaleza (September 17, 1971); Fluminense de Feira 0-3 Atlético de Alagoinhas (October 22, 1972); Calouros do Ar 0-3 América-RN (November 18, 1972); América-PE 1-4 América-RN (December 10, 1972)

The football (soccer) Campeonato Brasileiro Série B 1972, the second level of Brazilian National League, was played from September 10 to December 17, 1972. The competition had 23 clubs. All of the participating clubs were from the Northeast region.

Sampaio Corrêa beat Campinense on the finals, and was declared 1972 Brazilian Série B champions. The relegation and promotion system had not been implemented yet, so no clubs were promoted. As the First division of the championship began to grow in number of clubs, this edition of the second division was the last one until 1980.

== First phase ==
Group A

Pos	Team	Pld	W	D	L	GF	GA	GD	Pts
1	(Maranhão) Sampaio Corrêa	10	5	3	2	12	4	+8	13
2	(Piauí) Tiradentes	10	4	4	2	12	9	+3	12
3	(Maranhão) Moto Club	10	4	4	2	7	6	+1	12
4	(Ceará) Fortaleza	10	5	1	4	9	9	0	11
5	(Ceará) Guarany de Sobral	10	2	2	6	8	15	−7	6
6	(Piauí) Flamengo-PI	10	1	4	5	9	14	−5	6

Group B

Pos	Team	Pld	W	D	L	GF	GA	GD	Pts
1	(Paraíba) Campinense	10	7	0	3	20	9	+11	14
2	(Rio Grande do Norte) América-RN	10	5	3	2	15	10	+5	13
3	(Piauí) River	10	5	2	3	14	14	0	12
4	(Maranhão) Ferroviário-MA	10	4	4	2	12	9	+3	12
5	(Ceará) Maguari	10	2	1	7	7	15	−8	5
6	(Ceará) Calouros do Ar	10	1	2	7	11	22	−11	4

Group C

Pos	Team	Pld	W	D	L	GF	GA	GD	Pts
1	(Alagoas) CSA	8	4	2	2	14	11	+3	10
2	(Pernambuco) América-PE	8	4	2	2	8	9	−1	10
3	(Paraíba) Botafogo-PB	8	3	3	2	13	8	+5	9
4	(Rio Grande do Norte) Alecrim	8	1	4	3	10	12	−2	6
5	(Pernambuco) Ferroviário-PE	10	2	2	6	7	12	−5	6

Group D

Pos	Team	Pld	W	D	L	GF	GA	GD	Pts
1	(Bahia) Atlético de Alagoinhas	10	8	2	0	18	4	+14	18
2	(Sergipe) Itabaiana	10	4	3	3	13	10	+3	11
3	(Pernambuco) Central	10	3	5	2	8	6	+2	11
4	(Sergipe) Confiança	10	2	3	5	10	15	−5	7
5	(Bahia) Fluminense de Feira	9	1	5	3	9	16	−7	7 (Note: Fluminense de Feira and São Domingos didn't play their last match, since they had no chances of qualifying.)
6	(Alagoas) São Domingos	9	1	2	6	9	16	−7	4

== Second phase ==
Group E

Pos	Team	Pld	W	D	L	GF	GA	GD	Pts
1	(Maranhão) Sampaio Corrêa	6	3	2	1	6	3	+3	8
2	(Piauí) Tiradentes	6	3	2	1	6	3	+3	8
3	(Bahia) Atlético de Alagoinhas	6	1	2	3	2	5	−3	4
4	(Sergipe) Itabaiana	6	1	2	3	2	5	−3	4

Group F

Pos	Team	Pld	W	D	L	GF	GA	GD	Pts
1	(Paraíba) Campinense	6	6	0	0	11	2	+9	12
2	(Rio Grande do Norte) América-RN	6	4	0	2	9	5	+4	8
3	(Alagoas) CSA	6	1	0	5	3	8	−5	2
4	(Pernambuco) América-PE	6	1	0	5	3	11	−8	2

== Finals ==
17 December 1972

Sampaio Corrêa (Maranhão)	1–1 (a.e.t.)	(Paraíba) Campinense
Pelezinho 89'		Volmir 37'
Penalties
	5–4

Nhozinho Santos, São Luís (MA)
Referee: (Piauí) Ronald Monassa

== Sources ==
- RSSSF.com
- Globoesporte.com (in Portuguese)
