= Everaldo (footballer, born 1994) =

Brazilian footballer

Personal information
- Full name: Everaldo Silva do Nascimento
- Date of birth: 28 May 1994 (age 32)
- Place of birth: Olinda, Brazil
- Height: 1.72 m (5 ft 8 in)
- Position: Winger

Team information
- Current team: Santa Cruz
- Number: 37

Youth career
- América-PE

Senior career*
Years	Team	Apps	(Gls)
2014	América-PE	21	(4)
2015	Boa Esporte	1	(0)
2015–2017	Mogi Mirim	12	(0)
2016	→ Sâo José dos Campos (loan)	0	(0)
2017	→ Serra Talhada (loan)	6	(2)
2017–2019	Velo Clube	8	(3)
2017–2018	→ São Bento (loan)	46	(4)
2018–2019	→ Fluminense (loan)	38	(3)
2019–2023	Corinthians	33	(4)
2021	→ Sport Recife (loan)	21	(1)
2022–2023	→ América Mineiro (loan)	41	(7)
2023	América Mineiro	16	(0)
2024–2025	Vitória	18	(2)
2025	→ Coritiba (loan)	20	(0)
2026–	Santa Cruz	21	(1)
- * Club domestic league appearances and goals as of 9 November 2026

Everaldo Silva do Nascimento (born 28 May 1994), simply known as Everaldo, is a Brazilian professional footballer who plays as a winger for Santa Cruz.

== Club career ==
Born in Olinda, Everaldo made his senior debut with América-PE in 2014 and went on to play for Boa, Mogi Mirim, Sâo Jose, Serra Talhada (on loan) and Velo Clube in the following years.

On 10 May 2017, Everaldo was loaned out to São Bento, in Série C. On 23 November, his loan deal was extended for the upcoming season.

On 17 July 2018, Everaldo rescinded his contract with São Bento and joined Série A side Fluminense until the end of 2019 Campeonato Carioca. On 20 September, he scored his first goal for the club in a 2–0 victory against Deportivo Cuenca, in Copa Sudamericana. He scored his first league goal four days later, in a 2–1 win against Chapecoense.

=== Corinthians ===
In May 2019, he signed a four-year contract with Corinthians.

== Career statistics ==
As of match played 19 January 2025

Appearances and goals by club, season and competition
Club	Season	League			State league		Copa do Brasil		Continental		Other		Total	
Club	Season	Division	Apps	Goals	Apps	Goals	Apps	Goals	Apps	Goals	Apps	Goals	Apps	Goals
América-PE	2014	—			21 (Note: Appearance(s) in Campeonato Pernambucano)	4	—		—		—		21	4
Boa Esporte	2015	Série B	0	0	1 (Note: Appearance(s) in Campeonato Mineiro)	0	0	0	—		—		1	0
Mogi Mirim	2015	Série B	12	0	0	0	—		—		—		12	0
Joseense (loan)	2016	—			0	0	—		—		9 (Note: Appearance(s) in Copa Paulista)	2	9	2
Serra Talhada (loan)	2017	—			6	2	—		—		—		6	2
Velo Clube	2017	—			8 (Note: Appearance(s) in Campeonato Paulista Série A2)	3	—		—		—		8	3
São Bento (loan)	2017	Série C	19	3	0	0	0	0	—		—		19	3
São Bento (loan)	2018	Série B	15	1	12 (Note: Appearance(s) in Campeonato Paulista)	0	—		—		—		27	1
São Bento (loan)	Total		34	4	12	0	0	0	0	0	0	0	46	4
Fluminense (loan)	2018	Série A	23	1	0	0	0	0	8 (Note: Appearance(s) in Copa Sudamericana)	1	—		31	2
Fluminense (loan)	2019	Série A	2	0	13 (Note: Appearance(s) in Campeonato Carioca)	2	6	2	2	1	—		23	5
Fluminense (loan)	Total		25	1	13	2	6	2	10	2	0	0	54	7
Corinthians	2019	Série A	9	1	0	0	0	0	0	0	—		9	1
Corinthians	2020	Série A	13	2	11	1	2	0	1 (Note: Appearance(s) in Copa Libertadores)	0	—		27	3
Corinthians	Total		22	3	11	1	2	0	1	0	0	0	36	4
Sport Recife (loan)	2021	Série A	17	0	4	1	0	0	—		0	0	21	1
América Mineiro	2022	Série A	29	4	2	1	4	1	6	0	—		41	6
América Mineiro	2023	Série A	21	1	5	1	7	1	10	0	—		43	3
América Mineiro	Total		50	5	7	2	11	2	16	0	0	0	84	9
Vitória	2024	Série A	15	2	3 (Note: Appearance(s) in Campeonato Baiano)	0	0	0	—		2 (Note: Appearance(s) in Copa do Nordeste)	0	20	2
Coritiba	2025	Série B	0	0	2	0	0	0	—		—		2	0
Career total			175	15	88	15	19	4	27	2	11	2	320	38
