= Eustaquio =

Eustaquio is a given name. Notable people with the name include:

- Eustaquio Escandón (1862–1933), Mexican polo player in the 1900 Summer Olympics
- Eustaquio Ilundáin y Esteban (1862–1937), Cardinal of the Roman Catholic Church, Archbishop of Seville
- José Eustaquio Alves Lemos Filho (born 1993), Brazilian professional footballer
- Eustáquio van Lieshout, SS.CC., (1890–1943), Dutch missionary in Brazil
- Palhinha (Vanderlei Eustaquio de Oliveira) (born 1950), retired Brazilian football player
- Eustaquio Pedroso (1886 – death date unknown), Cuban baseball pitcher
- Eustaquio Díaz Vélez (1782–1856), Argentine military officer

== See also ==
- Mauro Eustáquio (born 1993), Canadian soccer player, brother of Stephen
- Stephen Eustáquio (born 1996), Canadian soccer player, brother of Mauro
- Eustaquio Méndez Province, province in the north-western parts of the Bolivian department Tarija
- Eustace
