= 2016 Campeonato Brasileiro Série D =

Campeonato Brasileiro Série D
- Season: 2016
- Champions: Volta Redonda
- Promoted: CSA; Moto Club; São Bento; Volta Redonda
- Matches: 266
- Goals: 669 (2.52 per match)
- Top goalscorer: Manoel Cristiano, Altos; 10 goals
- Biggest home win: 8–0 Atlético Acreano v Náutico; S2 2nd leg, 7 August
- Biggest away win: 0–4 Goianésia v Volta Redonda; R1, 12 June; Baré v Princesa do Solimões; R6, 17 July; Icasa v Juazeirense; R6, 17 July; 1–5 Náutico v Atlético Acreano; S2 1st leg, 30 July
- Highest attendance: 13,861 CSA 1–0 Ituano; QF 2nd leg, 4 September
- Lowest attendance: 9 Goianésia 0–1 Desportiva Ferroviária; R5, 10 July
- Total attendance: 427,483
- Average attendance: 1,632

The 2016 Campeonato Brasileiro Série D, the fourth level of the Brazilian League, was contested by 68 clubs. The competition started on 12 June and is ended on 1 October. The four teams in the semifinals, CSA, Moto Club, São Bento and Volta Redonda were promoted to the 2017 Campeonato Brasileiro Série C.

Volta Redonda were champions, beating CSA in the final.

== Competition format ==
In the first stage, 68 teams were divided into seventeen groups of four, organized regionally. The teams played home and away against the other three teams in their group, a total of six games. The winner of each group plus the best 15 runners-up qualified for the second stage. From the second stage on the competition was played as a knock-out tournament. The four semi-finalists qualified for the 2017 Campeonato Brasileiro Série C. The winners of the semifinals played the final over two legs to determine the champion.

== First stage ==
As at 17 July 2016

Key to colours in group tables
Group winners advance to the Second stage
Best group runners-up advance to the Second stage

=== Group A1 ===
Pos	Team	Pld	W	D	L	GF	GA	GD	Pts
1	(Acre (state)) Atlético Acreano (Q)	6	4	2	0	15	7	+8	14
2	(Amazonas (Brazilian state)) Nacional	6	2	2	2	8	8	0	8
3	(Rondônia) Genus	6	2	1	3	5	9	−4	7
4	(Amapá) Trem	6	1	1	4	5	9	−4	4

(Q) Qualified for the phase indicated

=== Group A2 ===
Pos	Team	Pld	W	D	L	GF	GA	GD	Pts
1	(Amazonas (Brazilian state)) Princesa do Solimões (Q)	6	4	1	1	11	5	+6	13
2	(Tocantins) Palmas (Q)	6	3	1	2	13	10	+3	10
3	(Pará) São Francisco	6	1	2	3	10	12	−2	5
4	(Roraima) Baré	6	0	4	2	6	13	−7	0 (Note: Baré deducted 4 points for fielding an ineligible player against Princesa do Solimões on 19 June.)

(Q) Qualified for the phase indicated

=== Group A3 ===
Pos	Team	Pld	W	D	L	GF	GA	GD	Pts
1	(Pará) São Raimundo (Q)	6	4	1	1	15	2	+13	13
2	(Roraima) Náutico (Q)	6	2	3	1	9	7	+2	9
3	(Rondônia) Rondoniense	6	2	1	3	8	14	−6	7
4	(Acre (state)) Rio Branco	6	1	1	4	6	15	−9	4

(Q) Qualified for the phase indicated

=== Group A4 ===
Pos	Team	Pld	W	D	L	GF	GA	GD	Pts
1	(Pará) Águia de Marabá (Q)	6	3	2	1	7	5	+2	11
2	(Maranhão) Moto Club (Q)	6	2	4	0	8	2	+6	10
3	(Tocantins) Tocantinópolis	6	2	2	2	5	5	0	8
4	(Amapá) Santos	6	0	2	4	3	11	−8	2

(Q) Qualified for the phase indicated

=== Group A5 ===
Pos	Team	Pld	W	D	L	GF	GA	GD	Pts
1	(Piauí) Altos (Q)	6	5	1	0	22	5	+17	16
2	(Bahia) Juazeirense (Q)	6	3	2	1	12	8	+4	11
3	Maranhão	6	2	0	4	7	12	−5	6
4	(Ceará) Icasa	6	0	1	5	3	19	−16	1

(Q) Qualified for the phase indicated

=== Group A6 ===
Pos	Team	Pld	W	D	L	GF	GA	GD	Pts
1	(Alagoas) CSA (Q)	6	3	2	1	13	6	+7	11
2	(Piauí) Parnahyba (Q)	6	2	3	1	11	6	+5	9
3	(Pernambuco) Central	6	2	3	1	5	4	+1	9
4	(Ceará) Guarani	6	0	2	4	5	18	−13	2

(Q) Qualified for the phase indicated

=== Group A7 ===
Pos	Team	Pld	W	D	L	GF	GA	GD	Pts
1	(Rio Grande do Norte) Globo (Q)	6	3	2	1	11	4	+7	11
2	(Pernambuco) América (Q)	6	3	1	2	9	7	+2	10
3	(Paraíba) Sousa	6	3	1	2	11	11	0	10
4	(Bahia) Galícia	6	1	0	5	7	16	−9	3

(Q) Qualified for the phase indicated

=== Group A8 ===
Pos	Team	Pld	W	D	L	GF	GA	GD	Pts
1	(Ceará) Uniclinic (Q)	6	3	3	0	11	5	+6	12
2	(Sergipe) Itabaiana (Q)	6	3	2	1	10	5	+5	11
3	(Rio Grande do Norte) Potiguar	6	3	1	2	8	6	+2	10
4	(Pernambuco) Serra Talhada	6	0	0	6	1	14	−13	0

(Q) Qualified for the phase indicated

=== Group A9 ===
Pos	Team	Pld	W	D	L	GF	GA	GD	Pts
1	(Paraíba) Campinense (Q)	6	3	1	2	7	5	+2	10
2	(Bahia) Fluminense de Feira (Q)	6	2	3	1	9	8	+1	9
3	(Alagoas) Murici	6	2	2	2	9	10	−1	8
4	Sergipe	6	0	4	2	6	8	−2	4

(Q) Qualified for the phase indicated

=== Group A10 ===
Pos	Team	Pld	W	D	L	GF	GA	GD	Pts
1	(Federal District (Brazil)) Ceilândia (Q)	6	5	0	1	19	6	+13	15
2	(Goiás) Aparecidense (Q)	6	4	1	1	9	7	+2	13
3	(Mato Grosso do Sul) Comercial	6	1	1	4	2	12	−10	4
4	(Mato Grosso) AA Araguaia	6	1	0	5	8	13	−5	3

(Q) Qualified for the phase indicated

=== Group A11 ===
Pos	Team	Pld	W	D	L	GF	GA	GD	Pts
1	(Mato Grosso do Sul) Sete de Setembro (Q)	6	3	2	1	9	6	+3	11
2	(Goiás) Anápolis (Q)	6	3	2	1	5	3	+2	11
3	(Federal District (Brazil)) Luziânia	6	1	3	2	4	5	−1	6
4	(Mato Grosso) Sinop	6	0	3	3	7	11	−4	3

(Q) Qualified for the phase indicated

=== Group A12 ===
Pos	Team	Pld	W	D	L	GF	GA	GD	Pts
1	(Rio de Janeiro (state)) Volta Redonda (Q)	6	4	2	0	11	1	+10	14
2	(Minas Gerais) URT (Q)	6	4	1	1	10	3	+7	13
3	(Espírito Santo) Desportiva Ferroviária	6	2	1	3	7	6	+1	7
4	(Goiás) Goianésia	6	0	0	6	2	20	−18	0

(Q) Qualified for the phase indicated

=== Group A13 ===
Pos	Team	Pld	W	D	L	GF	GA	GD	Pts
1	(Minas Gerais) Caldense (Q)	6	4	1	1	6	1	+5	13
2	Espírito Santo (Q)	6	2	2	2	4	3	+1	8
3	(Rio de Janeiro (state)) Boavista	6	2	1	3	3	5	−2	7
4	(São Paulo (state)) Osasco Audax	6	0	4	2	1	5	−4	4

(Q) Qualified for the phase indicated

=== Group A14 ===
Pos	Team	Pld	W	D	L	GF	GA	GD	Pts
1	(São Paulo (state)) São Bento (Q)	6	4	1	1	7	1	+6	13
2	(Rio de Janeiro (state)) Portuguesa	6	2	1	3	3	8	−5	7
3	(Minas Gerais) Villa Nova	6	1	4	1	3	3	0	7
4	(Rio Grande do Sul) São José	6	1	2	3	3	4	−1	5

(Q) Qualified for the phase indicated

=== Group A15 ===
Pos	Team	Pld	W	D	L	GF	GA	GD	Pts
1	(Paraná (state)) J. Malucelli (Q)	6	3	2	1	8	4	+4	11
2	(Santa Catarina (state)) Brusque (Q)	6	2	3	1	7	2	+5	9
3	(Rio Grande do Sul) Novo Hamburgo	6	2	2	2	4	6	−2	8
4	(Rio de Janeiro (state)) Madureira	6	1	1	4	2	9	−7	4

(Q) Qualified for the phase indicated

=== Group A16 ===
Pos	Team	Pld	W	D	L	GF	GA	GD	Pts
1	(Santa Catarina (state)) Internacional de Lages (Q)	6	3	1	2	8	4	+4	10
2	(São Paulo (state)) Linense (Q)	6	3	1	2	7	7	0	10
3	(Rio Grande do Sul) São Paulo	6	3	0	3	6	7	−1	9
4	(Paraná (state)) PSTC	6	1	2	3	6	9	−3	5

(Q) Qualified for the phase indicated

=== Group A17 ===
Pos	Team	Pld	W	D	L	GF	GA	GD	Pts
1	(São Paulo (state)) Ituano (Q)	6	4	1	1	15	5	+10	13
2	(Rio Grande do Sul) Caxias (Q)	6	3	0	3	9	9	0	9
3	(Paraná (state)) Maringá	6	2	2	2	8	10	−2	8
4	(Santa Catarina (state)) Metropolitano	6	1	1	4	5	13	−8	4

(Q) Qualified for the phase indicated

== Second stage ==
The Second stage was a two-legged knockout tie, with the draw regionalised.

=== Qualification and draw ===
The 32 qualifiers (17 group winners and 15 best performing group runners-up) were divided into two pots. Pot 1 contained the 16 best performing group winners. Pot 2 contained the worst performing group winner and the 15 qualifying group runners-up. In pot 1 the teams were numbered 1 to 16 in numerical order of the group they qualified from. In pot 2 the teams were numbered 17 to 32 in numerical order of the group they qualified from. In the case that one of the qualifying runners-up was from the same group as the worst performing group winner, both teams would be in pot 2 and the group winner would be numbered lower in sequence than the group runner-up.

To keep the draw regionalised Team 1 would play Team 18, Team 2 would play Team 17 and this pattern was repeated throughout the draw. The higher numbered team would play at home in the first leg.

==== Ranking of group winners ====
Ranking of group winners to determine the worst performing team to be placed into pot 2 was achieved by comparing 1) Points gained 2) Most victories 3) Best goal difference 4) Most goals scored 5) Sort.

Rank	Team	Pts	W	GD	GF	Pot
1	Altos	16	5	17	22	Pot 1
2	Ceilândia	15	5	13	19	Pot 1
3	Volta Redonda	14	4	10	11	Pot 1
4	Atlético Acreano	14	4	8	15	Pot 1
5	São Raimundo	13	4	13	15	Pot 1
6	Ituano	13	4	10	15	Pot 1
7	Princesa do Solimões	13	4	6	11	Pot 1
8	São Bento	13	4	6	7	Pot 1
9	Caldense	13	4	5	6	Pot 1
10	Uniclinic	12	3	6	11	Pot 1
11	CSA	11	3	7	13	Pot 1
12	Globo	11	3	7	11	Pot 1
13	J. Malucelli	11	3	4	8	Pot 1
14	Sete de Setembro	11	3	3	9	Pot 1
15	Águia de Marabá	11	3	2	7	Pot 1
16	Internacional de Lages	10	3	4	8	Pot 1
17	Campinense	10	3	2	7	Pot 2

==== Ranking of group runners-up ====
Ranking of group runners-up to determine the 15 best performing teams to be placed into pot 2 was achieved by comparing 1) Points gained 2) Most victories 3) Best goal difference 4) Most goals scored 5) Sort.

Rank	Team	Pts	W	GD	GF	Pot
1	URT	13	4	7	10	Pot 2
2	Aparecidense	13	4	2	9	Pot 2
3	Itabaiana	11	3	5	10	Pot 2
4	Juazeirense	11	3	4	12	Pot 2
5	Anápolis	11	3	2	5	Pot 2
6	Palmas	10	3	3	13	Pot 2
7	América	10	3	2	9	Pot 2
8	Linense	10	3	0	7	Pot 2
9	Moto Club	10	2	6	8	Pot 2
10	Caxias	9	3	0	9	Pot 2
11	Parnahyba	9	2	5	11	Pot 2
12	Brusque	9	2	5	7	Pot 2
13	Náutico	9	2	2	9	Pot 2
14	Fluminense de Feira	9	2	1	9	Pot 2
15	Espírito Santo	8	2	1	4	Pot 2
16	Nacional	8	2	0	8	Eliminated
17	Portuguesa	7	2	-5	3	Eliminated

==== Qualification pots ====
Pot 1
#	Group	Team
1	A1	(Acre (state)) Atlético Acreano
2	A2	(Amazonas (Brazilian state)) Princesa do Solimões
3	A3	(Pará) São Raimundo
4	A4	(Pará) Águia de Marabá
5	A5	(Piauí) Altos
6	A6	(Alagoas) CSA
7	A7	(Rio Grande do Norte) Globo
8	A8	(Ceará) Uniclinic
9	A10	(Federal District (Brazil)) Ceilândia
10	A11	(Mato Grosso do Sul) Sete de Setembro
11	A12	(Rio de Janeiro (state)) Volta Redonda
12	A13	(Minas Gerais) Caldense
13	A14	(São Paulo (state)) São Bento
14	A15	(Paraná (state)) J. Malucelli
15	A16	(Santa Catarina (state)) Internacional de Lages
16	A17	(São Paulo (state)) Ituano

Pot 2
#	Group	Team
17	A2	(Tocantins) Palmas
18	A3	(Roraima) Náutico
19	A4	(Maranhão) Moto Club
20	A5	(Bahia) Juazeirense
21	A6	(Piauí) Parnahyba
22	A7	(Pernambuco) América
23	A8	(Sergipe) Itabaiana
24	A9	(Paraíba) Campinense
25	A9	(Bahia) Fluminense de Feira
26	A10	(Goiás) Aparecidense
27	A11	(Goiás) Anápolis
28	A12	(Minas Gerais) URT
29	A13	Espírito Santo
30	A15	(Santa Catarina (state)) Brusque
31	A16	(São Paulo (state)) Linense
32	A17	(Rio Grande do Sul) Caxias

==== Ties ====
Matches took place between 23 July and 7 August.

Team 1	Agg.	Team 2	1st leg	2nd leg	Tie number
Náutico	1–13	Atlético Acreano	1–5	0–8	B1
Palmas	1–6	Princesa do Solimões	1–3	0–3	B2
Juazeirense	5–2	São Raimundo	2–1	3–1	B3
Moto Club	2–1	Águia de Marabá	1–0	1–1	B4
América	1–4	Altos	1–2	0–2	B5
Parnahyba	1–5	CSA	1–2	0–3	B6
Campinense	2–1	Globo	2–1	0–0	B7
Itabaiana	3–2	Uniclinic	0–0	3–2	B8
Aparecidense	1–2	Ceilândia	0–0	1–2	B9
Fluminense de Feira	4–0	Sete de Setembro	2–0	2–0	B10
URT	1–3	Volta Redonda	1–1	0–2	B11
Anápolis	2–2 (7–6 p)	Caldense	1–1	1–1	B12
Brusque	0–1	São Bento	0–0	0–1	B13
Espírito Santo	1–3	J. Malucelli	0–1	1–2	B14
Caxias	1–2	Internacional de Lages	1–2	0–0	B15
Linense	2–2 (Note: Ituano go through due to Away goals rule)	Ituano	2–1	0–1	B16

== Third stage ==
The third stage was also a two-legged knockout tie, with the draw regionalised. The ties were predetermined from the second stage, with the winner of second stage tie 1 playing the winner of second stage tie 2, etc.

=== Ties ===
First team in the draw has home advantage in the second leg.

Team 1	Agg.	Team 2	1st leg	2nd leg	Tie number
Atlético Acreano	4–2	Princesa do Solimões	1–1	3–1	C1
Juazeirense	2–3	Moto Club	1–3	1–0	C2
Altos	2–3	CSA	0–3	2–0	C3
Itabaiana	2–2 (4–3 p)	Campinense	0–2	2–0	C4
Ceilândia	1–1 (3–4 p)	Fluminense de Feira	1–0	0–1	C5
Volta Redonda	2–1	Anápolis	2–1	0–0	C6
São Bento	3–1	J. Malucelli	1–1	2–0	C7
Ituano	5–4	Internacional de Lages	5–3	0–1	C8

== Final stage ==
The final stage was a two leg knockout competition with quarter-final, semi-final and final rounds. The draw for the quarter-final was seeded based on the table of results of all matches in the competition for the qualifying teams. First would play eighth, second would play seventh, etc. The top four seeded teams would play the second leg at home. The four quarter-final winners were promoted to Série C for 2017.

The draw for the semi-final was seeded based on the table of results of all matches in the competition for the qualifying teams. First would play fourth, second would play third. The top two seeded teams would play the second leg at home.

In the final, the team with the best record in the competition would play the second leg at home.

=== Quarter final seedings ===
Seed	Team	Pts	W	GD	GF
1	(Acre (state)) Atlético Acreano	24	10	32	10
2	(Rio de Janeiro (state)) Volta Redonda	22	10	16	3
3	(São Paulo (state)) São Bento	21	10	11	2
4	(Alagoas) CSA	20	10	21	9
5	(São Paulo (state)) Ituano	19	10	22	11
6	(Sergipe) Itabaiana	18	10	15	9
7	(Bahia) Fluminense de Feira	18	10	14	9
8	(Maranhão) Moto Club	17	10	13	5

=== Quarter final ties ===
First team in the draw had home advantage in the second leg.

Team 1	Agg.	Team 2	1st leg	2nd leg
Atlético Acreano	3–4	Moto Club	2–2	1–2
Volta Redonda	5–3	Fluminense de Feira	3–2	2–1
São Bento	3–0	Itabaiana	1–0	2–0
CSA	3–1	Ituano	2–1	1–0

=== Semi finals seedings ===
Seed	Team	Pts	W	GD	GF
1	(Rio de Janeiro (state)) Volta Redonda	28	12	21	6
2	(São Paulo (state)) São Bento	27	12	14	2
3	(Alagoas) CSA	26	12	24	10
4	(Maranhão) Moto Club	21	12	17	8

=== Semi finals ties ===
First team in the draw had home advantage in the second leg.

Team 1	Agg.	Team 2	1st leg	2nd leg
Volta Redonda	4–1	Moto Club	1–1	3–1
São Bento	1–2	CSA	0–2	1–0

=== Final ===
First team in the draw had home advantage in the second leg.

Team 1	Agg.	Team 2	1st leg	2nd leg
Volta Redonda	4–0	CSA	0–0	4–0

September 25, 2016
19:00 UTC−3

CSA	0 – 0	Volta Redonda
	Report

Rei Pelé, Maceió
Attendance: 10,395
Referee: Jailson Macedo Freitas

October 1, 2016
21:00 UTC−3

Volta Redonda	4 – 0	CSA
Dija Baiano 26'; Marcos Junior 31', 66'; David Batista 39'	Report

Raulino de Oliveira, Volta Redonda
Attendance: 6,748
Referee: Felipe Gomes da Silva
