= Roberto Fernandes =

Brazilian football manager

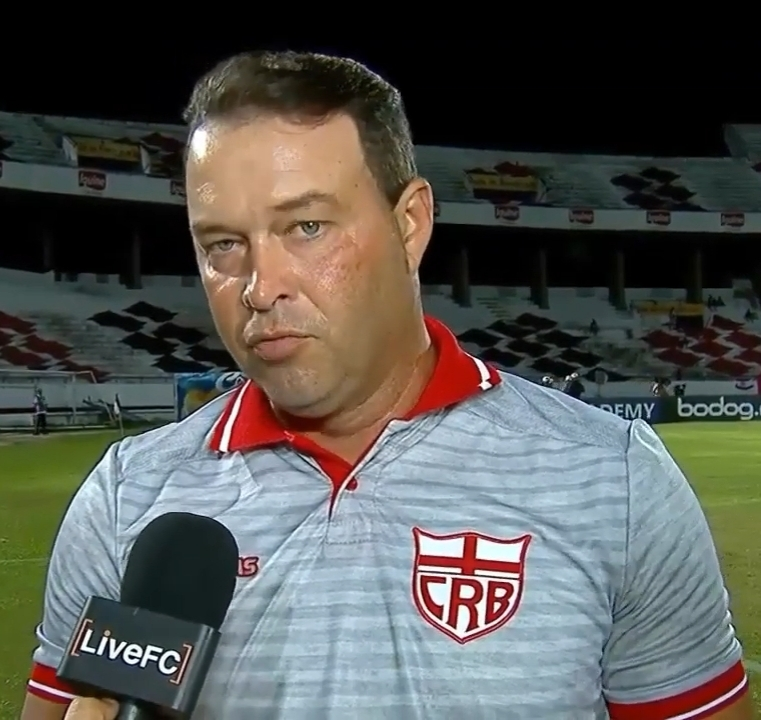

Personal information
- Full name: José Roberto Fernandes Barros
- Date of birth: 5 May 1971 (age 55)
- Place of birth: Recife, Brazil
- Position: Midfielder

Youth career
- Náutico
- Santa Cruz

Senior career*
Years	Team	Apps	(Gls)
- América-SP
- Ferroviário do Recife

Managerial career
- 1997: Ferroviário do Recife
- 1998: Surubim
- 1999: Unibol
- 2000: Osan
- 2001: Primavera
- 2002: Independente de Limeira
- 2002: Linense
- 2002: Londrina U20
- 2003: Londrina
- 2004: Guaratinguetá
- 2004: Anapolina
- 2004: São Bento
- 2004: União São João
- 2005: Ceará
- 2005–2006: Vila Nova
- 2006: Santo André
- 2006: Vila Nova
- 2006: Ceilândia
- 2006: Ituano
- 2007: Brasiliense
- 2007–2008: Náutico
- 2008: Atlético Paranaense
- 2008–2009: Náutico
- 2009: Figueirense
- 2009: Fortaleza
- 2010: Brasiliense
- 2010: Atlético Goianiense
- 2010–2011: Náutico
- 2011: Paysandu
- 2011–2012: Guarantinguetá
- 2012–2013: América de Natal
- 2013–2014: ABC
- 2014: Remo
- 2014–2015: América de Natal
- 2016: Capivariano
- 2016: Confiança
- 2016: Paraná
- 2017: Bangu
- 2017: Confiança
- 2017–2018: Náutico
- 2018: Santa Cruz
- 2018–2019: CRB
- 2019: ABC
- 2020: América de Natal
- 2020–2021: CRB
- 2021: Santa Cruz
- 2022: Náutico
- 2022: CSA
- 2023: Itabaiana
- 2024: Retrô
- 2025: Piauí
- 2025: Capital
- 2026: Treze
- 2026: Retrô
- 2026: Anápolis
- * Club domestic league appearances and goals

José Roberto Fernandes Barros (born 5 May 1971), known as Roberto Fernandes, is a Brazilian football coach and former player who played as a midfielder.

== Career ==
Born in Recife, Pernambuco, Fernandes played for Náutico and Santa Cruz as a youth. A midfielder, he played professionally for América-SP and Ferroviário do Recife before retiring; he subsequently became a manager of the latter club in 1997.

Fernandes subsequently worked for Surubim and Unibol before moving to the São Paulo state, where he led Primavera to the Campeonato Paulista Série B2 title in 2001. He began the 2002 season with Independente de Limeira, later working with Linense (where he was stabbed by a player whom he released) and Londrina's under-20 squad; he was appointed manager of the first team in the latter club for the ensuing campaign on 14 November 2002.

Fernandes achieved promotion to the Campeonato Paulista Série A2 with Guaratinguetá in 2004, and was later in charge of Anapolina during the Série B. He also worked with São Bento in that year, where he left in December to take over União São João.

On 23 December 2004, Fernandes left União São João without managing a single match for the club, after accepting an offer from Ceará. He was sacked the following March, being replaced by Jair Pereira, and later went on to work at Vila Nova.

Fernandes was in charge of five different clubs during the 2006 season: Santo André, Vila Nova, Ceilândia, Ituano, and Brasiliense; with the latter club he won the 2007 Campeonato Brasiliense before accepting an offer from Náutico in July of that year. He resigned from Náutico on 20 May 2008, despite leading the Série A at the time, and was named at the helm of Atlético Paranaense just hours later, replacing Ney Franco; he was himself dismissed by Furacão on 4 August.

Fernandes returned to Náutico on 8 August 2008, but was sacked the following 7 March. He took over Figueirense five days later, but was relieved of his duties on 29 August.

Appointed in charge of Fortaleza on 22 September 2009 in the place of Márcio Fernandes, Fernandes subsequently worked for Brasiliense and Atlético Goianiense before returning to Náutico on 30 September 2010, where he replaced Alexandre Gallo. Sacked on 2 May of the following year, he was named Paysandu manager late in the month, but his reign only lasted until 13 September.

Fernandes was named Americana manager on 20 October 2011, replacing Sérgio Guedes, but was sacked on 29 January of the following year, after just three matches in the campaign, as the club returned to their previous name of Guaratinguetá. He was appointed at the helm of América de Natal in March 2012, winning the 2012 Campeonato Potiguar but being sacked in February 2013.

On 8 August 2013, Fernandes was appointed manager of América's rivals ABC. He narrowly avoided relegation in the 2013 Série B, but was sacked on 16 March 2014.

In October 2014, after a short stint at Remo, Fernandes returned to América. He left the club on 8 October of the following year, and subsequently worked for Capivariano, Confiança and Paraná during the 2016 season.

Fernandes returned to Náutico for a fourth spell on 1 August 2017, after previously working at Bangu and Confiança in the campaign. Despite winning the 2018 Campeonato Pernambucano, he was sacked on 6 May, and was subsequently in charge of Santa Cruz for their Série C campaign.

In September 2018, he replaced Doriva as manager of CRB. He left the club the following April, subsequently returning to former sides ABC and América before rejoining CRB on 18 December 2020.

On 24 May 2021, after losing the year's Campeonato Alagoano, Fernandes was sacked. He returned to Náutico for a fifth spell on 17 April of the following year, being dismissed exactly three months later.

On 8 August 2022, Fernandes replaced Alberto Valentim at the helm of CSA, but was himself dismissed on 14 October.

== Honours ==
Primavera

- Campeonato Paulista Série B2: 2001

Brasiliense

- Campeonato Brasiliense: 2007

América de Natal

- Campeonato Potiguar: 2012, 2015
- Copa RN: 2012

Remo

- Campeonato Paraense: 2014

Náutico

- Campeonato Pernambucano: 2018
