= Parrel =

Parrel may refer to:

- Parrel beads, a part of a sailing vessel's rigging
- Parrel, synonym of the Trepat variety of wine grape

== See also ==
- Parral (disambiguation)
