= Dija Baiano =

Brazilian footballer (born 1990)

Personal information
- Full name: Djavan de Lima Araujo
- Date of birth: 5 April 1990 (age 36)
- Place of birth: Feira de Santana (BA), Brazil
- Height: 1.74 m (5 ft 9 in)
- Position: Forward

Team information
- Current team: Al-Bukiryah
- Number: 90

Youth career
- 2004–2006: Cruzeiro
- 2006–2007: Juventude

Senior career*
Years	Team	Apps	(Gls)
2008	Ferroviária		
2009	Gama		
2010–2012	Brasiliense	25	(6)
2012	→ Guaratinguetá (loan)	0	(0)
2012	→ Ipatinga (loan)	7	(0)
2013	Caldense	0	(0)
2013–2014	Al-Mesaimeer		
2015	Mamoré	0	(0)
2015	Ituano	0	(0)
2015–2016	Volta Redonda	11	(6)
2016	→ Macaé (loan)	4	(0)
2017	América de Natal	0	(0)
2017–2018	Volta Redonda	35	(5)
2018	Al-Orobah	14	(4)
2019	Boavista	6	(2)
2019	Treze	3	(0)
2020–2022	Uberlândia		
2022–	Al-Bukiryah		
- * Club domestic league appearances and goals as of 12:10, 21 January 2020 (UTC)

Djavan de Lima Araujo (born 5 April 1990), commonly known as Dija Baiano, is a Brazilian professional footballer for Al-Bukiryah.

He has represented Brasiliense, Ipatinga, Volta Redonda, Macaé, Boavista and Treze in national league competitions, and was part of the Volta Redonda team which won 2016 Campeonato Brasileiro Série D.

He spent time abroad in Qatar with Al-Mesaimeer in 2013–14, and in Saudi Arabia with Al-Orobah in 2018.

== Honours ==
Brasiliense

- Campeonato Brasiliense: 2011

Volta Redonda

- Campeonato Brasileiro Série D: 2016
