= 2018 Campeonato Brasileiro Série D =

Campeonato Brasileiro Série D
- Season: 2018
- Champions: Ferroviário (1st title)
- Promoted: Ferroviário; Imperatriz; São José; Treze
- Matches: 266
- Goals: 677 (2.55 per match)
- Top goalscorer: Edson Cariús (11 goals)
- Biggest home win: Santos 8–1 Plácido de Castro; Group A2, R6, 27 May
- Biggest away win: Santa Rita 0–5 Treze; Group A9, R5, 20 May
- Highest scoring: 9 goals Santos 8–1 Plácido de Castro; Group A2, R6, 27 May
- Highest attendance: 12,713; Treze 1–0 (2–1 p) Imperatriz; Semi-finals, 2nd leg, 23 July
- Lowest attendance: 3 Belo Jardim 1–1 Guarani de Juazeiro; Group A6, R6, 27 May
- Total attendance: 306,756
- Average attendance: 1,184

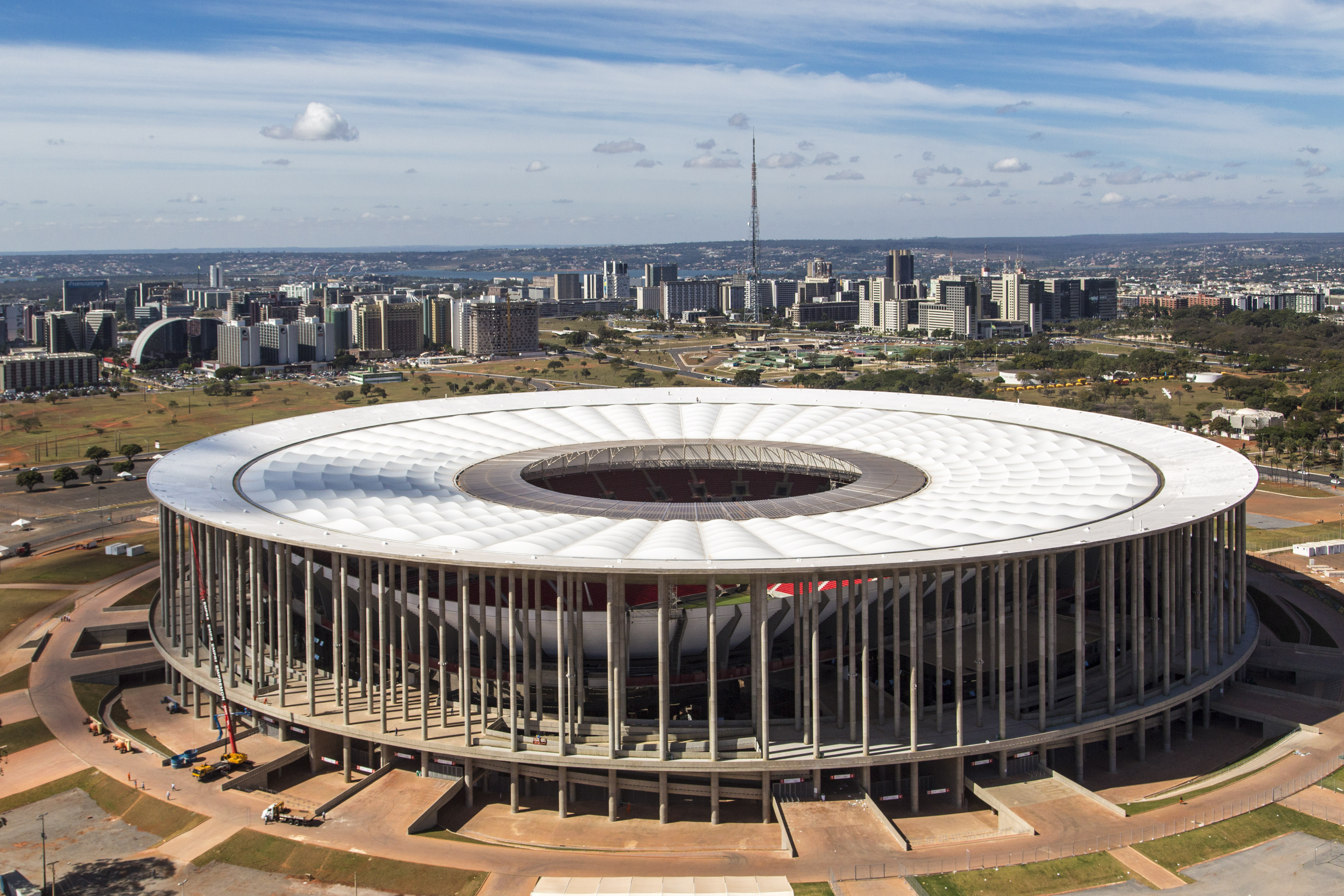
Aerial view of Brasilia National Stadium, June 2013.

The 2018 Campeonato Brasileiro Série D was a football competition held in Brazil, equivalent to the fourth division. The competition started on 21 April and ended on 4 August 2018.

Sixty-eight teams competed in the tournament. Sixty-four teams qualified from their state leagues and cups, and four relegated from the 2017 Campeonato Brasileiro Série C (ASA, Macaé, Mogi Mirim and Moto Club).

Ferroviário, Imperatriz, São José and Treze qualified for the semi-finals and were promoted to the 2019 Campeonato Brasileiro Série C.

Ferroviário won the title after defeating Treze in the final.

== Teams ==
Location of teams in 2018 Série D

The following 68 teams qualified for the tournament:

- São Paulo: 4 berths
- Rio de Janeiro, Minas Gerais, Rio Grande do Sul, Santa Catarina, Paraná, Pernambuco, Goiás and Bahia: 3 berths each
- All other federations: 2 berths each
- Teams relegated from 2017 Campeonato Brasileiro Série C
  - ASA (Alagoas)
  - Macaé (Rio de Janeiro)
  - Mogi Mirim (São Paulo)
  - Moto Club (Maranhão)

Federation	Team	Home city
(Acre (state)) Acre; 2 berths	Plácido de Castro	Plácido de Castro
(Acre (state)) Acre; 2 berths	Rio Branco	Rio Branco
(Alagoas) Alagoas; 2 + 1 berths	ASA	Arapiraca
(Alagoas) Alagoas; 2 + 1 berths	Murici	Murici
(Alagoas) Alagoas; 2 + 1 berths	Santa Rita	Boca da Mata
(Amapá) Amapá; 2 berths	Macapá	Macapá
(Amapá) Amapá; 2 berths	Santos	Macapá
(Amazonas (Brazilian state)) Amazonas; 2 berths	Manaus	Manaus
(Amazonas (Brazilian state)) Amazonas; 2 berths	Nacional	Manaus
(Bahia) Bahia; 3 berths	Fluminense de Feira	Feira de Santana
(Bahia) Bahia; 3 berths	Jacuipense	Riachão do Jacuípe
(Bahia) Bahia; 3 berths	Vitória da Conquista	Vitória da Conquista
(Ceará) Ceará; 2 berths	Ferroviário	Fortaleza
(Ceará) Ceará; 2 berths	Guarani de Juazeiro	Juazeiro do Norte
(Espírito Santo) Espírito Santo; 2 berths	Atlético Itapemirim	Itapemirim
(Espírito Santo) Espírito Santo; 2 berths	Espírito Santo	Vitória
(Federal District (Brazil)) Federal District; 2 berths	Brasiliense	Taguatinga
(Federal District (Brazil)) Federal District; 2 berths	Ceilândia	Ceilândia
(Goiás) Goiás; 3 berths	Aparecidense	Aparecida de Goiânia
(Goiás) Goiás; 3 berths	Iporá	Iporá
(Goiás) Goiás; 3 berths	Itumbiara	Itumbiara
(Maranhão) Maranhão; 2 + 1 berths	Cordino	Barra do Corda
(Maranhão) Maranhão; 2 + 1 berths	Imperatriz	Imperatriz
(Maranhão) Maranhão; 2 + 1 berths	Moto Club	São Luís
(Mato Grosso) Mato Grosso; 2 berths	Dom Bosco	Cuiabá
(Mato Grosso) Mato Grosso; 2 berths	Sinop	Sinop
Mato Grosso do Sul 2 berths	Corumbaense	Corumbá
Mato Grosso do Sul 2 berths	Novoperário	Campo Grande
(Minas Gerais) Minas Gerais; 3 berths	Caldense	Poços de Caldas
(Minas Gerais) Minas Gerais; 3 berths	Uberlândia	Uberlândia
(Minas Gerais) Minas Gerais; 3 berths	URT	Patos de Minas
(Pará) Pará; 2 berths	Independente	Tucuruí
(Pará) Pará; 2 berths	São Raimundo-PA	Santarém
(Paraíba) Paraíba; 2 berths	Campinense	Campina Grande
(Paraíba) Paraíba; 2 berths	Treze	Campina Grande
(Paraná (state)) Paraná; 3 berths	Cianorte	Cianorte
(Paraná (state)) Paraná; 3 berths	Maringá	Maringá
(Paraná (state)) Paraná; 3 berths	Prudentópolis	Prudentópolis
(Pernambuco) Pernambuco; 3 berths	Belo Jardim	Belo Jardim
(Pernambuco) Pernambuco; 3 berths	Central	Caruaru
(Pernambuco) Pernambuco; 3 berths	Flamengo de Arcoverde	Arcoverde
(Piauí) Piauí; 2 berths	4 de Julho	Piripiri
(Piauí) Piauí; 2 berths	Altos	Altos
(Rio de Janeiro (state)) Rio de Janeiro; 3 + 1 berths	Americano	Campos dos Goytacazes
(Rio de Janeiro (state)) Rio de Janeiro; 3 + 1 berths	Macaé	Macaé
(Rio de Janeiro (state)) Rio de Janeiro; 3 + 1 berths	Madureira	Rio de Janeiro
(Rio de Janeiro (state)) Rio de Janeiro; 3 + 1 berths	Nova Iguaçu	Nova Iguaçu
Rio Grande do Norte 2 berths	América de Natal	Natal
Rio Grande do Norte 2 berths	ASSU	Assu
(Rio Grande do Sul) Rio Grande do Sul; 3 berths	Caxias	Caxias do Sul
(Rio Grande do Sul) Rio Grande do Sul; 3 berths	Novo Hamburgo	Novo Hamburgo
(Rio Grande do Sul) Rio Grande do Sul; 3 berths	São José	Porto Alegre
(Rondônia) Rondônia; 2 berths	Barcelona	Vilhena
(Rondônia) Rondônia; 2 berths	Real Ariquemes	Ariquemes
(Roraima) Roraima; 2 berths	Baré	Boa Vista
(Roraima) Roraima; 2 berths	São Raimundo-RR	Boa Vista
(Santa Catarina (state)) Santa Catarina; 3 berths	Brusque	Brusque
(Santa Catarina (state)) Santa Catarina; 3 berths	Internacional de Lages	Lages
(Santa Catarina (state)) Santa Catarina; 3 berths	Tubarão	Tubarão
(São Paulo (state)) São Paulo; 4 + 1 berths	Ferroviária	Araraquara
(São Paulo (state)) São Paulo; 4 + 1 berths	Linense	Lins
(São Paulo (state)) São Paulo; 4 + 1 berths	Mirassol	Mirassol
(São Paulo (state)) São Paulo; 4 + 1 berths	Mogi Mirim	Mogi Mirim
(São Paulo (state)) São Paulo; 4 + 1 berths	Novorizontino	Novo Horizonte
(Sergipe) Sergipe; 2 berths	Itabaiana	Itabaiana
(Sergipe) Sergipe; 2 berths	Sergipe	Aracaju
(Tocantins) Tocantins; 2 berths	Interporto	Porto Nacional
(Tocantins) Tocantins; 2 berths	Sparta	Araguaína

== Competition format ==
In the first stage, 68 teams were divided into seventeen groups of four, organized regionally. 32 teams (17 winners and 15 runners-up) qualified for the second stage. From the second stage on the competition was played as a knock-out tournament with each round contested over two legs.

== First stage ==
In the first stage, each group played on a home-and-away round-robin basis. The winners of each group and the best 15 runners-up qualified for the second stage. The teams were ranked according to points (3 points for a win, 1 point for a draw, and 0 points for a loss). If tied on points, the following criteria would be used to determine the ranking: 1. Wins; 2. Goal difference; 3. Goals scored; 4. Head-to-head (if the tie was only between two teams); 5. Fewest red cards; 6. Fewest yellow cards; 7. Draw in the headquarters of the Brazilian Football Confederation (Regulations Article 12).

Key to colours in group tables
Group winners advance to the Second stage
Best group runners-up advance to the Second stage

=== Group A1 ===
Pos	Team	Pld	W	D	L	GF	GA	GD	Pts
1	(Amazonas (Brazilian state)) Manaus	6	4	0	2	14	8	+6	12
2	(Acre (state)) Rio Branco	6	3	2	1	13	7	+6	11
3	(Amapá) Macapá	6	2	0	4	7	16	−9	6
4	(Roraima) Baré	6	1	2	3	5	8	−3	5

=== Group A2 ===
Pos	Team	Pld	W	D	L	GF	GA	GD	Pts
1	(Pará) Independente	6	3	3	0	8	3	+5	12
2	(Amapá) Santos	6	2	2	2	13	8	+5	8
3	(Rondônia) Barcelona	6	2	2	2	8	7	+1	8
4	(Acre (state)) Plácido de Castro	6	1	1	4	8	19	−11	4

=== Group A3 ===
Pos	Team	Pld	W	D	L	GF	GA	GD	Pts
1	(Amazonas (Brazilian state)) Nacional	6	3	1	2	9	4	+5	10
2	(Roraima) São Raimundo-RR	6	2	2	2	10	11	–1	8
3	(Pará) São Raimundo-PA	6	2	2	2	7	8	–1	8
4	(Rondônia) Real Ariquemes	6	1	3	2	7	10	–3	6

=== Group A4 ===
Pos	Team	Pld	W	D	L	GF	GA	GD	Pts
1	(Ceará) Ferroviário	6	2	4	0	7	5	+2	10
2	(Maranhão) Cordino	6	2	3	1	6	4	+2	9
3	(Piauí) 4 de Julho	6	1	3	2	3	5	−2	6
4	(Tocantins) Interporto	6	1	2	3	7	9	−2	5

=== Group A5 ===
Pos	Team	Pld	W	D	L	GF	GA	GD	Pts
1	(Maranhão) Moto Club	6	4	1	1	6	3	+3	13
2	(Piauí) Altos	6	3	2	1	7	3	+4	11
3	(Tocantins) Sparta	6	1	2	3	6	9	–3	5
4	(Rio Grande do Norte) ASSU	6	1	1	4	2	6	–4	4

=== Group A6 ===
Pos	Team	Pld	W	D	L	GF	GA	GD	Pts
1	(Rio Grande do Norte) América de Natal	6	4	2	0	11	6	+5	14
2	(Maranhão) Imperatriz	6	2	3	1	10	3	+7	9
3	(Pernambuco) Belo Jardim	6	0	4	2	6	12	−6	4
4	(Ceará) Guarani de Juazeiro	6	0	3	3	8	14	−6	3

=== Group A7 ===
Pos	Team	Pld	W	D	L	GF	GA	GD	Pts
1	Sergipe	6	4	1	1	8	5	+3	13
2	(Bahia) Jacuipense	6	2	2	2	8	8	0	8
3	(Pernambuco) Central	6	1	3	2	7	6	+1	6
4	(Alagoas) ASA	6	0	4	2	7	11	−4	4

=== Group A8 ===
Pos	Team	Pld	W	D	L	GF	GA	GD	Pts
1	(Paraíba) Campinense	6	5	1	0	12	3	+9	16
2	(Bahia) Fluminense de Feira	6	4	1	1	18	3	+15	13
3	(Pernambuco) Flamengo de Arcoverde	6	1	1	4	4	16	−12	4
4	(Alagoas) Murici	6	0	1	5	4	16	−12	1

=== Group A9 ===
Pos	Team	Pld	W	D	L	GF	GA	GD	Pts
1	(Paraíba) Treze	6	3	3	0	14	4	+10	12
2	(Sergipe) Itabaiana	6	3	1	2	11	9	+2	10
3	(Bahia) Vitória da Conquista	6	2	2	2	4	6	−2	8
4	(Alagoas) Santa Rita	6	1	0	5	6	16	−10	3

=== Group A10 ===
Pos	Team	Pld	W	D	L	GF	GA	GD	Pts
1	(Goiás) Iporá	6	4	1	1	10	4	+6	13
2	(Federal District (Brazil)) Brasiliense	6	3	2	1	9	3	+6	11
3	(Mato Grosso do Sul) Corumbaense	6	2	2	2	5	9	−4	8
4	(Mato Grosso) Dom Bosco	6	0	1	5	2	10	−8	1

=== Group A11 ===
Pos	Team	Pld	W	D	L	GF	GA	GD	Pts
1	(Mato Grosso) Sinop	6	3	1	2	6	5	+1	10
2	(Mato Grosso do Sul) Novoperário	6	3	1	2	7	7	0	10
3	(Goiás) Aparecidense	6	2	2	2	11	10	+1	8
4	(Federal District (Brazil)) Ceilândia	6	1	2	3	9	11	–2	5

=== Group A12 ===
Pos	Team	Pld	W	D	L	GF	GA	GD	Pts
1	(Rio de Janeiro (state)) Macaé	6	3	2	1	10	8	+2	11
2	(Minas Gerais) URT	6	3	1	2	10	8	+2	10
3	(Goiás) Itumbiara	6	3	1	2	8	6	+2	10
4	Espírito Santo	6	0	2	4	6	12	–6	2

=== Group A13 ===
Pos	Team	Pld	W	D	L	GF	GA	GD	Pts
1	(Minas Gerais) Uberlândia	6	3	2	1	10	7	+3	11
2	(São Paulo (state)) Novorizontino	6	2	3	1	10	9	+1	9
3	(Rio de Janeiro (state)) Americano	6	2	2	2	10	11	−1	8
4	(Espírito Santo) Atlético Itapemirim	6	0	3	3	3	6	−3	3

=== Group A14 ===
Pos	Team	Pld	W	D	L	GF	GA	GD	Pts
1	(São Paulo (state)) Linense	6	2	3	1	5	3	+2	9
2	(Paraná (state)) Maringá	6	2	3	1	7	6	+1	9
3	(Rio de Janeiro (state)) Madureira	6	1	3	2	6	7	–1	6
4	(Minas Gerais) Caldense	6	1	3	2	5	7	–2	6

=== Group A15 ===
Pos	Team	Pld	W	D	L	GF	GA	GD	Pts
1	(Rio Grande do Sul) Caxias	6	5	1	0	13	2	+11	16
2	(Santa Catarina (state)) Internacional de Lages	6	3	0	3	7	11	−4	9
3	(São Paulo (state)) Mirassol	6	2	1	3	3	5	−2	7
4	(Rio de Janeiro (state)) Nova Iguaçu	6	1	0	5	6	11	−5	3

=== Group A16 ===
Pos	Team	Pld	W	D	L	GF	GA	GD	Pts
1	(Santa Catarina (state)) Tubarão	6	5	0	1	9	3	+6	15
2	(Rio Grande do Sul) Novo Hamburgo	6	2	2	2	7	6	+1	8
3	(Paraná (state)) Cianorte	6	1	3	2	2	5	−3	6
4	(São Paulo (state)) Ferroviária	6	0	3	3	3	7	–4	3

=== Group A17 ===
Pos	Team	Pld	W	D	L	GF	GA	GD	Pts
1	(Rio Grande do Sul) São José	6	6	0	0	10	4	+6	18
2	(Santa Catarina (state)) Brusque	6	3	0	3	9	5	+4	9
3	(Paraná (state)) Prudentópolis	6	2	0	4	6	8	−2	6
4	(São Paulo (state)) Mogi Mirim	6	1	0	5	6	14	−8	3

== Second stage ==
The Second stage was a two-legged knockout tie, with the draw regionalised.

=== Qualification and draw ===
The 32 qualifiers (17 group winners and 15 best performing group runners-up) were divided into two pots. Pot 1 contained the 16 best performing group winners. Pot 2 contained the worst performing group winner and the 15 qualifying group runners-up. In pot 1 the teams were numbered 1 to 16 in numerical order of the group they qualified from. In pot 2 the teams were numbered 17 to 32 in numerical order of the group they qualified from. In the case that one of the qualifying runners-up was from the same group as the worst performing group winner, both teams would be in pot 2 and the group winners would be numbered lower in sequence than the group runners-up.

The teams were ranked according to points. If tied on points, the following criteria would be used to determine the ranking: 1. Wins; 2. Goal difference; 3. Goals scored; 4. Draw in the headquarters of the Brazilian Football Confederation (Regulations Article 14).

To keep the draw regionalised Team 1 played Team 18, Team 2 played Team 17 and this pattern was repeated throughout the draw. The higher numbered team played at home in the first leg.

==== Ranking of group winners ====
Rank	Team	Pts	W	GD	GF	Pot
1	(Rio Grande do Sul) São José	18	6	+6	10	Pot 1
2	(Rio Grande do Sul) Caxias	16	5	+11	13	Pot 1
3	(Paraíba) Campinense	16	5	+9	12	Pot 1
4	(Santa Catarina (state)) Tubarão	15	5	+6	9	Pot 1
5	(Rio Grande do Norte) América de Natal	14	4	+5	11	Pot 1
6	(Goiás) Iporá	13	4	+6	10	Pot 1
7	Sergipe	13	4	+3	8	Pot 1
8	(Maranhão) Moto Club	13	4	+3	6	Pot 1
9	(Amazonas (Brazilian state)) Manaus	12	4	+6	14	Pot 1
10	(Paraíba) Treze	12	3	+10	14	Pot 1
11	(Pará) Independente	12	3	+5	8	Pot 1
12	(Minas Gerais) Uberlândia	11	3	+3	10	Pot 1
13	(Rio de Janeiro (state)) Macaé	11	3	+2	10	Pot 1
14	(Amazonas (Brazilian state)) Nacional	10	3	+5	9	Pot 1
15	(Mato Grosso) Sinop	10	3	+1	6	Pot 1
16	(Ceará) Ferroviário	10	2	+2	7	Pot 1
17	(São Paulo (state)) Linense	9	2	+2	5	Pot 2

==== Ranking of group runners-up ====
Rank	Team	Pts	W	GD	GF	Pot
1	(Bahia) Fluminense de Feira	13	4	+15	18	Pot 2
2	(Acre (state)) Rio Branco	11	3	+6	13	Pot 2
3	(Federal District (Brazil)) Brasiliense	11	3	+6	9	Pot 2
4	(Piauí) Altos	11	3	+4	7	Pot 2
5	(Sergipe) Itabaiana	10	3	+2	11	Pot 2
6	(Minas Gerais) URT	10	3	+2	10	Pot 2
7	(Mato Grosso do Sul) Novoperário	10	3	0	7	Pot 2
8	(Santa Catarina (state)) Brusque	9	3	+4	9	Pot 2
9	(Santa Catarina (state)) Internacional de Lages	9	3	–4	7	Pot 2
10	(Maranhão) Imperatriz	9	2	+7	10	Pot 2
11	(Maranhão) Cordino	9	2	+2	6	Pot 2
12	(São Paulo (state)) Novorizontino	9	2	+1	10	Pot 2
13	(Paraná (state)) Maringá	9	2	+1	7	Pot 2
14	(Amapá) Santos	8	2	+5	13	Pot 2
15	(Rio Grande do Sul) Novo Hamburgo	8	2	+1	7	Pot 2
16	(Bahia) Jacuipense	8	2	0	8	Eliminated
17	(Roraima) São Raimundo-RR	8	2	–1	10	Eliminated

==== Qualification pots ====
Pot 1
#	Group	Team
1	A1	(Amazonas (Brazilian state)) Manaus
2	A2	(Pará) Independente
3	A3	(Amazonas (Brazilian state)) Nacional
4	A4	(Ceará) Ferroviário
5	A5	(Maranhão) Moto Club
6	A6	(Rio Grande do Norte) América de Natal
7	A7	Sergipe
8	A8	(Paraíba) Campinense
9	A9	(Paraíba) Treze
10	A10	(Goiás) Iporá
11	A11	(Mato Grosso) Sinop
12	A12	(Rio de Janeiro (state)) Macaé
13	A13	(Minas Gerais) Uberlândia
14	A15	(Rio Grande do Sul) Caxias
15	A16	(Santa Catarina (state)) Tubarão
16	A17	(Rio Grande do Sul) São José

Pot 2
#	Group	Team
17	A1	(Acre (state)) Rio Branco
18	A2	(Amapá) Santos
19	A4	(Maranhão) Cordino
20	A5	(Piauí) Altos
21	A6	(Maranhão) Imperatriz
22	A8	(Bahia) Fluminense de Feira
23	A9	(Sergipe) Itabaiana
24	A10	(Federal District (Brazil)) Brasiliense
25	A11	(Mato Grosso do Sul) Novoperário
26	A12	(Minas Gerais) URT
27	A13	(São Paulo (state)) Novorizontino
28	A14	(São Paulo (state)) Linense
29	A14	(Paraná (state)) Maringá
30	A15	(Santa Catarina (state)) Internacional de Lages
31	A16	(Rio Grande do Sul) Novo Hamburgo
32	A17	(Santa Catarina (state)) Brusque

==== Ties ====
The matches were played between 2 and 10 June.

Team 1	Agg.	Team 2	1st leg	2nd leg
Santos (Amapá)	1–2	(Amazonas (Brazilian state)) Manaus	1–1	0–1
Rio Branco (Acre (state))	4–3	(Pará) Independente	3–0	1–3
Altos (Piauí)	5–4	(Amazonas (Brazilian state)) Nacional	3–0	2–4
Cordino (Maranhão)	3–4	(Ceará) Ferroviário	3–3	0–1
Fluminense de Feira (Bahia)	1–5	(Maranhão) Moto Club	0–2	1–3
Imperatriz (Maranhão)	2–2 (5–4 p)	(Rio Grande do Norte) América de Natal	1–0	1–2
Brasiliense (Federal District (Brazil))	2–1	Sergipe	2–1	0–0
Itabaiana (Sergipe)	1–1 (5–6 p)	(Paraíba) Campinense	0–1	1–0
URT (Minas Gerais)	2–2 (2–3 p)	(Paraíba) Treze	1–1	1–1
Novoperário (Mato Grosso do Sul)	4–5	(Goiás) Iporá	2–2	2–3
Linense (São Paulo (state))	2–2 (4–2 p)	(Mato Grosso) Sinop	2–1	0–1
Novorizontino (São Paulo (state))	3–1	(Rio de Janeiro (state)) Macaé	2–1	1–0
Internacional de Lages (Santa Catarina (state))	1–3	(Minas Gerais) Uberlândia	1–0	0–3
Maringá (Paraná (state))	1–4	(Rio Grande do Sul) Caxias	1–1	0–3
Brusque (Santa Catarina (state))	2–2 (3–4 p)	(Santa Catarina (state)) Tubarão	1–0	1–2
Novo Hamburgo (Rio Grande do Sul)	2–2 (2–3 p)	(Rio Grande do Sul) São José	2–1	0–1

== Third stage ==
The third stage was a two-legged knockout tie, with the draw regionalised. The ties were predetermined from the second stage, with the winners of second stage tie 1 playing the winners of second stage tie 2, etc. The teams were seeded according to their performance in the tournament with the higher-seeded team hosting the second leg.

=== Ties ===
The matches were played between 16 and 25 June.

Team 1	Agg.	Team 2	1st leg	2nd leg
Rio Branco (Acre (state))	2–2 (2–3 p)	(Amazonas (Brazilian state)) Manaus	1–2	1–0
Ferroviário (Ceará)	5–3	(Piauí) Altos	1–1	4–2
Imperatriz (Maranhão)	6–3	(Maranhão) Moto Club	2–1	4–2
Brasiliense (Federal District (Brazil))	1–1 (4–5 p)	(Paraíba) Campinense	1–0	0–1
Treze (Paraíba)	3–2	(Goiás) Iporá	2–0	1–2
Linense (São Paulo (state))	5–4	(São Paulo (state)) Novorizontino	3–2	2–2
Uberlândia (Minas Gerais)	2–3	(Rio Grande do Sul) Caxias	1–1	1–2
Tubarão (Santa Catarina (state))	1–3	(Rio Grande do Sul) São José	1–1	0–2

== Final stages ==
The final stages were a two leg knockout competition with quarter-finals, semi-finals and finals rounds. The draw for the quarter-finals was seeded based on the table of results of all matches in the competition for the qualifying teams. First played eighth, second played seventh, etc. The top four seeded teams played the second leg at home. The four quarter-final winners were promoted to Série C for 2019.

The draw for the semi-finals was seeded based on the table of results of all matches in the competition for the qualifying teams. First played fourth, second played third. The top two seeded teams played the second leg at home.

In the finals, the team with the best record in the competition played the second leg at home.

=== Quarter-finals seedings ===
Seed	Team	Pts	W	GD	GF
1	(Rio Grande do Sul) São José	25	8	+8	15
2	(Rio Grande do Sul) Caxias	24	7	+15	20
3	(Paraíba) Campinense	22	7	+9	14
4	(Amazonas (Brazilian state)) Manaus	19	6	+7	18
5	(Maranhão) Imperatriz	18	5	+10	18
6	(Ceará) Ferroviário	18	4	+5	16
7	(Paraíba) Treze	17	4	+11	19
8	(São Paulo (state)) Linense	16	4	+3	12

=== Quarter-finals ties ===
The matches were played between 1 and 9 July.

Team 1	Agg.	Team 2	1st leg	2nd leg
Linense (São Paulo (state))	1–2	(Rio Grande do Sul) São José	1–0	0–2
Treze (Paraíba)	4–1	(Rio Grande do Sul) Caxias	1–0	3–1
Ferroviário (Ceará)	3–3 (5–4 p)	(Paraíba) Campinense	3–2	0–1
Imperatriz (Maranhão)	2–2 (3–2 p)	(Amazonas (Brazilian state)) Manaus	1–0	1–2

=== Semi-finals seedings ===
Seed	Team	Pts	W	GD	GF
1	(Rio Grande do Sul) São José	28	9	+9	17
2	(Paraíba) Treze	23	6	+14	23
3	(Maranhão) Imperatriz	21	6	+10	20
4	(Ceará) Ferroviário	21	5	+5	19

=== Semi-finals ties ===
The matches were played between 15 and 23 July.

Team 1	Agg.	Team 2	1st leg	2nd leg
Ferroviário (Ceará)	4–3	(Rio Grande do Sul) São José	3–1	1–2
Imperatriz (Maranhão)	1–1 (1–2 p)	(Paraíba) Treze	1–0	0–1

=== Finals seedings ===
Seed	Team	Pts	W	GD	GF
1	(Paraíba) Treze	26	7	+14	24
2	(Ceará) Ferroviário	24	6	+6	23

=== Finals ===
The matches were played on 30 July and 4 August.

Team 1	Agg.	Team 2	1st leg	2nd leg
Ferroviário (Ceará)	3–1	(Paraíba) Treze	3–0	0–1

30 July 2018
19:15 UTC−3

Ferroviário (Ceará)	3–0	(Paraíba) Treze
Janeudo 24'; Edson Cariús 64'; Robson Simplício 86'	Report

Castelão, Fortaleza
Attendance: 6,667
Referee: André Luiz de Freitas Castro (Goiás)

4 August 2018
18:30 UTC−3

Treze (Paraíba)	1–0	(Ceará) Ferroviário
Marcelinho Paraíba 70' (pen.)	Report

Amigão, Campina Grande
Attendance: 7,031
Referee: Leandro Vuaden (Rio Grande do Sul)

== Top goalscorers ==
Rank	Player	Team	Goals
1	Edson Cariús	(Ceará) Ferroviário	11
2	Júnior Chicão	(Maranhão) Imperatriz	8
3	Jailson	(Bahia) Fluminense de Feira	7
4	Lima	(Santa Catarina (state)) Brusque	6
4	Mateus Oliveira	(Acre (state)) Rio Branco	6
4	Raí	(Roraima) São Raimundo-RR	6
4	Ulisses	(Maranhão) Cordino	6
4	Wesley	(Rio Grande do Sul) Caxias	6
9	Bruno Batata	(Paraná (state)) Maringá	5
9	Nena	(Amazonas (Brazilian state)) Manaus	5
9	Pereira	(São Paulo (state)) Novorizontino	5
9	Tiago Amaral	(Minas Gerais) Uberlândia	5

Source:CBF
