= Parral =

Parral may refer to:

- El Parral, Chiapas, Mexico
- El Parral, Avila, Spain
- Parral, Chihuahua, Mexico
- Parral, Chile
- Parral, Peru
- The village and monastery of Santa Maria del Parral, near Segovia, Spain
- Parral (vine system), a vine training system
- Parral, nickname of Geraldo José da Silva Filho
