= Calouros do Ar Futebol Clube =

Brazilian football club

Calouros do Ar
- Full name: Calouros do Ar Futebol Clube
- Nickname(s): Tremendão; Tricolor tricolaço
- Founded: January 1, 1952
- Ground: Estádio Brigadeiro Médico José da Silva Porto, Fortaleza, Ceará state, Brazil
- Capacity: 3,000
Home colours	Away colours

Calouros do Ar Futebol Clube, commonly known as Calouros do Ar, is a Brazilian football club based in Fortaleza, Ceará state. They competed in the Série B once.

== History ==
The club was founded on January 1, 1952. Calouros do Ar won the Campeonato Cearense in 1955. They competed in the Série B in 1972, when they had a weak performance.

== Honours ==
- Campeonato Cearense
  - Winners (1): 1955
- Torneio Início do Ceará
  - Winners (4): 1955, 1958, 1968, 1971

== Stadium ==
Calouros do Ar Futebol Clube play their home games at Estádio Brigadeiro Médico José da Silva Porto. The stadium has a maximum capacity of 3,000 people.
