= Clube Ferroviário do Recife =

Brazilian football club

Ferroviário do Recife
- Full name: Clube Ferroviário do Recife
- Nickname: Ferrim
- Founded: March 17, 1928
- Dissolved: 2008; 17 years ago
- Ground: Jaboatão, Recife, Pernambuco state, Brazil
- Capacity: 5,000
Home colours	Away colours	Third colours

Clube Ferroviário do Recife, commonly known as Ferroviário do Recife, was a Brazilian football club based in Recife, Pernambuco state. They competed in the Série B twice.

== History ==
The club was founded on March 17, 1928. They competed in the Série B in 1971, when they were eliminated n the First Stage, and in 1972, when they were again eliminated in the First Stage of the competition.

== Honours ==
- Torneio Início de Pernambuco
  - Winners (1): 1961

== Stadium ==
Clube Ferroviário do Recife play their home games at Estádio Jefferson de Freitas, nicknamed Jaboatão. The stadium has a maximum capacity of 5,000 people.
