= Parral (footballer) =

Brazilian footballer (born 1979)

Personal information
- Full name: Geraldo José da Silva Filho
- Date of birth: December 31, 1979 (age 46)
- Place of birth: Recife, Brazil
- Height: 1.74 m (5 ft 9 in)
- Position: Right back

Team information
- Current team: Serra Talhada

Youth career
- 1995–1998: Náutico

Senior career*
Years	Team	Apps	(Gls)
1999	Sport		
2000	Vitória		
2000	Tubarão-SC		
2000–2002	Fortuna Köln		
2002–2003	Petrolina-PE		
2004	Sport		
2004–2005	Portuguesa Santista		
2005	Internacional		
2006	Guarani		
2006–2007	Paraná		
2009	Santa Cruz		
2010	Paysandu		
2010	Mixto		
2013–	Serra Talhada		
- * Club domestic league appearances and goals

Geraldo José da Silva Filho (born December 31, 1979), or simply Parral, is a Brazilian right back who plays for Serra Talhada.

== Honours ==
- Paraná State League: 2006
