= Júnior Lemos =

Brazilian footballer (born 1993)

Personal information
- Full name: José Eustaquio Alves Lemos Filho
- Date of birth: February 27, 1992 (age 34)
- Place of birth: Belo Horizonte, Brazil
- Height: 1.65 m (5 ft 5 in)
- Position: Midfielder

Team information
- Current team: Caruaru City

Senior career*
Years	Team	Apps	(Gls)
2013–2014	América Mineiro	7	(0)
2014	→ Nacional-MG (loan)	9	(0)
2015	Tupi	3	(0)
2016	Tricordiano	9	(0)
2016–2017	Atlético Zacatepec	5	(0)
2018	Central	19	(0)
2019	Náutico	2	(0)
2019	Luverdense	1	(0)
2020	URT	8	(1)
2021	Central	11	(1)
2022	Juventus-SP	11	(0)
2023–	Caruaru City	4	(0)
- * Club domestic league appearances and goals

José Eustaquio Alves Lemos Filho (born 30 July 1993), known as Júnior Lemos, is a Brazilian footballer who plays for Caruaru City.
