= Clube Atlético Pernambucano =

Atlético Pernambucano
- Full name: Clube Atlético Pernambucano
- Nickname: Tatu-Bola (Armadillo)
- Short name: Atlético-PE, CAPE
- Founded: 8 March 2006; 20 years ago
- Ground: Estádio Municipal Paulo Petribú
- Capacity: 5,000
- President: Lucas Lisboa
- Head coach: Gabriel Lisboa
- League: Campeonato Pernambucano
- 2024: Pernambucano Série A2, 10th of 10 (relegated)
Home colours	Away colours

Clube Atlético Pernambucano, also known by the abbreviations Atlético-PE or CAPE, is a Brazilian football club from the city of Carpina in the state of Pernambuco. Founded in 2006, it plays in the Campeonato Pernambucano, the top tier of football in the state.

== History ==
The club finished as runners-up to Vera Cruz in the Campeonato Pernambucano Série A2 in 2014, earning a first-ever promotion to the Campeonato Pernambucano. During their top-flight debut season in 2015, the club set the record for the match with the lowest attendance in the history of the competition, as there was not the necessary permit from the fire department to have any spectators for the game against Vera Cruz on 21 February.

After finishing its first two top-flight seasons in 9th and 7th place, the club entered the 2017 Campeonato Pernambucano with an under-23 squad. The club's six games of the first phase of the season were split equally between draws and defeats, before a whitewash of 10 defeats in the relegation round, and descent with three games remaining.

Despite being relegated in the state season in 2017, the club debuted in national competition in the Campeonato Brasileiro Série D based on state performance in 2016, due to Serra Talhada's withdrawal. The club arrived 28 minutes late to their debut in the competition, despite playing at home against Campinense; the bus sent by the club president to transport the players from the training ground broke down, and the president had to call for a school bus, on which the players did their warm-up. Atlético-PE won 4–3, with the winning goal scored in added time.

Atlético-PE and eight other clubs were barred from competing in the Campeonato Pernambucano Série A2 in 2019 due to failed inspections of stadiums. In August 2024, having gained no points from nine games, the club suffered relegation to the Campeonato Pernambucano Série A3. Following the extinction of the lower leagues, the club returned to an extended 31-team Campeonato Pernambucano in 2026–27.
