= Flamengo Sport Club de Arcoverde =

Flamengo de Arcoverde
- Full name: Flamengo Sport Club de Arcoverde
- Nicknames: Tigre do Moxotó; Rubro-Negro Sertanejo; Fera Sertaneja
- Founded: 1 May 1959; 67 years ago
- Dissolved: 8 May 2025; 16 months ago
- Ground: Estádio Municipal Áureo Bradley, Arcoverde, Pernambuco state, Brazil
- Capacity: 3,500
Home colors	Away colors

Flamengo Sport Club de Arcoverde, commonly known as Flamengo de Arcoverde, is a Brazilian football club based in Arcoverde, Pernambuco state. They competed in the Série C once.

== History ==
The club was founded on 1 May 1959. Flamengo de Arcoverde won the Campeonato Pernambucano Second Level in 1996. They competed in the Série C in 1997, when they were eliminated in the First Stage of the competition.

== Achievements ==
- Campeonato Pernambucano Second Level:
  - Winners (2): 1996 and 2016

== Stadium ==
Flamengo Esporte Clube de Arcoverde play their home games at Estádio Municipal Áureo Bradley. The stadium has a maximum capacity of 3,500 people.
