= Estádio Cornélio de Barros =

Stadium in Salgueiro, Brazil

- Salgueirão
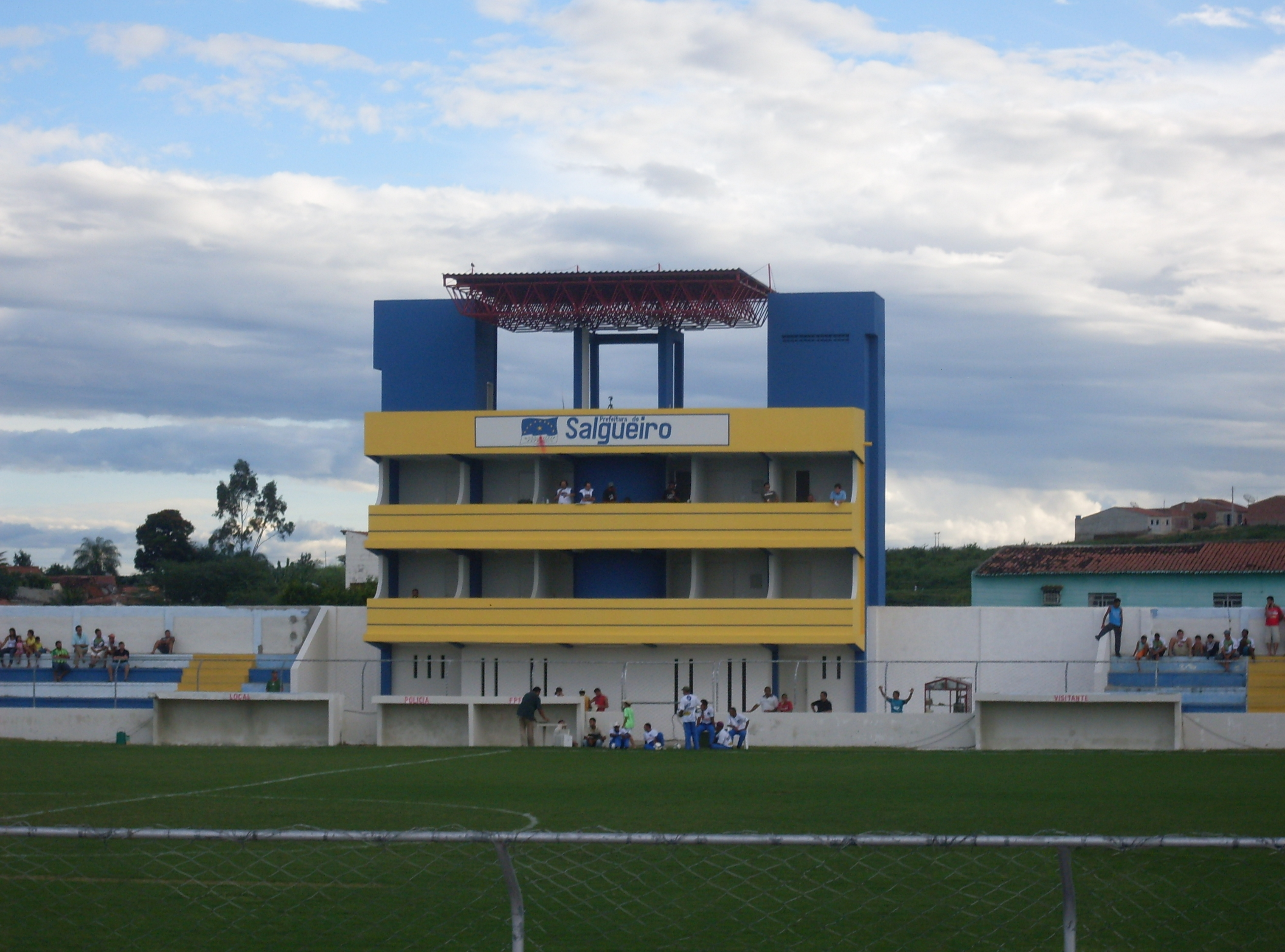
- Interactive map of Estádio Cornélio de Barros
- Full name: Estádio Cornélio de Barros
- Location: Salgueiro, Pernambuco, Brazil
- Coordinates: 8°4′30″S 39°7′24″W
- Capacity: 11,000
- Surface: Grass

Construction
- Opened: July 2, 1970; 56 years ago

Tenant
- Salgueiro Atlético Clube

Estádio Cornélio de Barros, also known as Salgueirão, is a stadium in Salgueiro, Brazil. It has a capacity of 11,000 spectators. It is the home of Salgueiro Atlético Clube.
