= Salgueiro Atlético Clube =

Salgueiro
- Full name: Salgueiro Atlético Clube
- Nickname(s): Carcará do Sertão (Caracara of the Hinterland); SAC
- Founded: March 22, 1972 (53 years ago)
- Dissolved: 2024
- Ground: Estádio Cornélio de Barros
- Capacity: 11,000
- President: Clebeu Cordeiro
- Head coach: Daniel Neri
- 2023: Pernambucano, 4th of 13
Home colors	Away colors

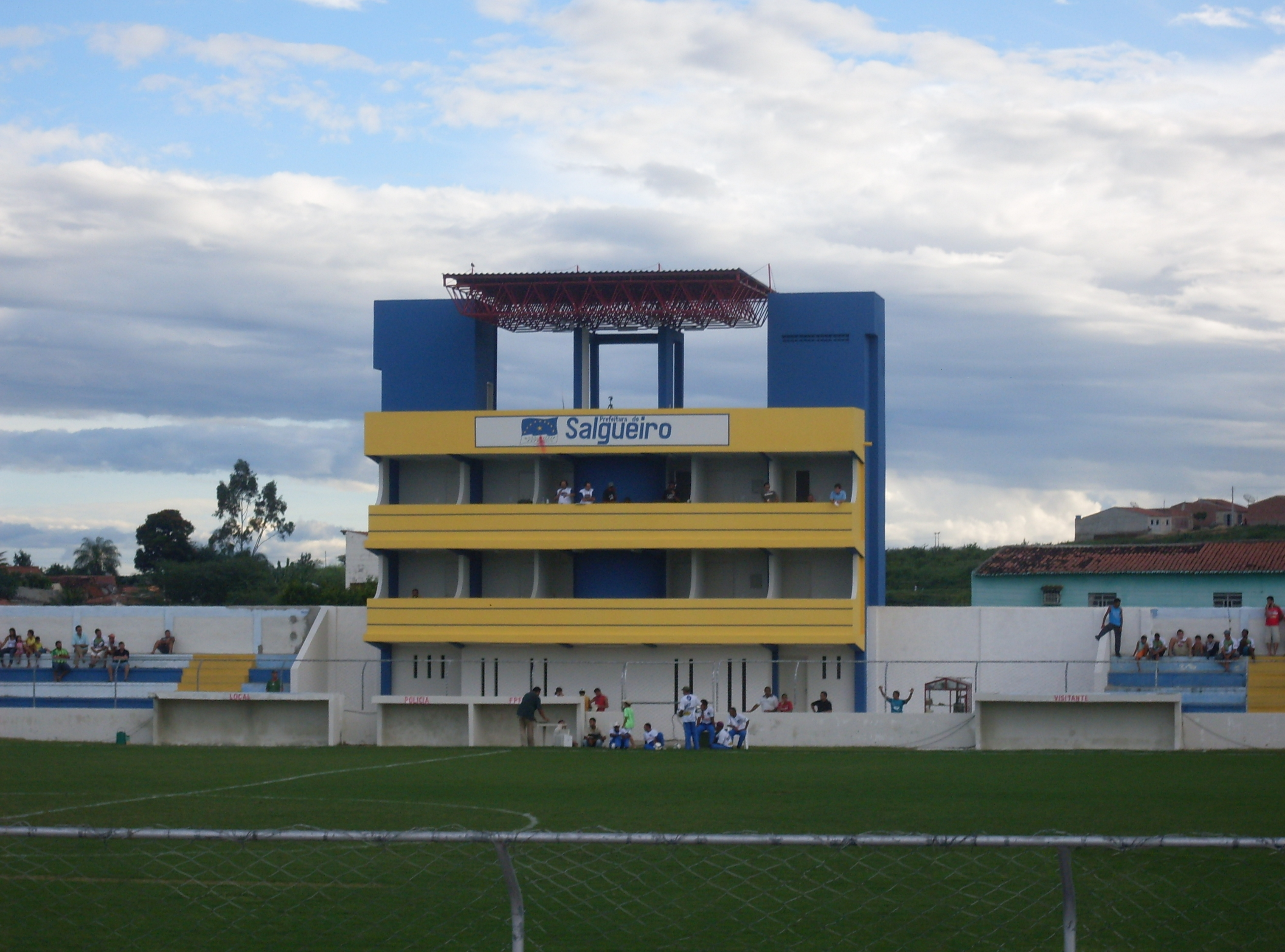
Estádio Cornélio de Barros

Salgueiro Atlético Clube is a Brazilian football club, founded in 1972 in Salgueiro, Pernambuco.

== History ==
The club was founded on May 23, 1972. Salgueiro's greatest achievement so far was being the first club outside Recife, to win the Pernambuco state championship. This fact was accomplished on August 6, 2020.

== Honours ==
=== Official tournaments ===
State
Competitions	Titles	Seasons
Campeonato Pernambucano	1	2020
Copa Pernambuco	1	2005
Campeonato Pernambucano Série A2	1	2007

=== Others tournaments ===
==== Inter-state ====
- Copa Integração (1): 2005

=== Runners-up ===
- Campeonato Pernambucano (2): 2015, 2017

== Appearances in competitions ==
- Pernambuco Championship Second level: 2

2005, 2007

- (Pernambuco) Campeonato Pernambucano: 5

2006, 2008, 2009, 2010, 2011

- (Brazil) Campeonato Brasileiro Série C: 3

2008 (14th), 2009 (10th), 2010 (3rd)

- (Brazil) Campeonato Brasileiro Série B: 1

2011

== Rivalry ==
Salgueiro versus Olympilagos

== Current squad ==
Note: Flags indicate national team as defined under FIFA eligibility rules; some limited exceptions apply. Players may hold more than one non-FIFA nationality.

No.	Pos.	Nation	Player
—	GK	(Brazil) BRA	Fernando
—	GK	(Brazil) BRA	Luciano
—	GK	(Brazil) BRA	Mondragon
—	DF	(Brazil) BRA	Hyago
—	DF	(Brazil) BRA	Lúcio
—	DF	(Brazil) BRA	Luís Eduardo
—	DF	(Brazil) BRA	Marcos Tamandaré
—	DF	(Brazil) BRA	Marlon
—	DF	(Brazil) BRA	Michael
—	DF	(Brazil) BRA	Ranieri
—	DF	(Brazil) BRA	Rogério
—	DF	(Brazil) BRA	Thyego
—	MF	(Brazil) BRA	Alexson
—	MF	(Brazil) BRA	Berger

No.	Pos.	Nation	Player
—	MF	(Brazil) BRA	Cássio
—	MF	(Brazil) BRA	Clebinho
—	MF	(Brazil) BRA	Moreilândia
—	MF	(Brazil) BRA	Pio
—	MF	(Brazil) BRA	Rodolfo Potiguar
—	MF	(Brazil) BRA	Valdeir
—	MF	(Brazil) BRA	Vitor Caicó
—	FW	(Brazil) BRA	Anderson Lessa
—	FW	(Brazil) BRA	Cicinho
—	FW	(Brazil) BRA	Gustavo Alves
—	FW	(Brazil) BRA	Júlio Alves
—	FW	(Brazil) BRA	Kanu
—	FW	(Brazil) BRA	Paulo Júnior

=== Out on loan ===
Note: Flags indicate national team as defined under FIFA eligibility rules; some limited exceptions apply. Players may hold more than one non-FIFA nationality.

No.	Pos.	Nation	Player
—	MF	(Brazil) BRA	Anderson Paraíba (to ABC)
—	FW	(Brazil) BRA	Patric (to Sanfrecce Hiroshima)
—	FW	(Brazil) BRA	Willian Lira (to PS Barito Putera)
