= Afogados da Ingazeira Futebol Clube =

Brazilian football club

Afogados
- Full name: Afogados da Ingazeira Futebol Clube
- Nicknames: Coruja do Sertão; Coruja do Pajeú; Chape do Nordeste; Tricolor do Pajéu; Afogados
- Founded: 18 December 2013; 12 years ago
- Ground: Vianão
- Capacity: 1,735
- Chairman: João Nogueira Lima
- Head coach: Pedro Manta
- League: Campeonato Pernambucano Série A2
- 2025: Pernambucano, 9th of 10 (relegated)
Home colours	Away colours

Afogados da Ingazeira Futebol Clube, known as Afogados da Ingazeira or simply Afogados, is a Brazilian football club from Afogados da Ingazeira, Pernambuco.

== History ==
Founded in 2013, Afogados' first professional competition occurred in the following year, as the club played in the Campeonato Pernambucano Série A2. In 2016 the club achieved promotion to the first division, after finishing second.

After three years in the first division, Afogados finished third in the 2019 season, thus qualifying for the 2020 Campeonato Brasileiro Série D. In February 2020, the club achieved its biggest feat after knocking out Campeonato Brasileiro Série A side Atlético Mineiro of the year's Copa do Brasil.

== Honours ==
- Campeonato Pernambucano Série A2
  - Champions (1): 2023
