= Belo Jardim Futebol Clube =

Brazilian association football club

Belo Jardim
- Full name: Belo Jardim Futebol Clube
- Nickname(s): Calango do Agreste
- Founded: January 18, 2005 (20 years ago)
- Ground: Mendonção, Belo Jardim, Pernambuco state, Brazil
- Capacity: 5,000
Home colors	Away colors

Belo Jardim Futebol Clube, commonly known as Belo Jardim, is a Brazilian football club based in Belo Jardim, Pernambuco state.

== History ==
The club was founded on January 18, 2005. Belo Jardim finished in the second position in the Campeonato Pernambucano Second Level in 2011, losing the competition to Serra Talhada, thus they were promoted to the 2012 First Level.

== Stadium ==
Belo Jardim Futebol Clube play their home games at Estádio José Bezerra de Mendonça, commonly known as Mendonção. The stadium has a maximum capacity of 7,000 people.
