= Serra Talhada Futebol Clube =

Brazilian football club

Serra Talhada
- Full name: Serra Talhada Futebol Clube
- Founded: February 25, 2011; 14 years ago
- Ground: Pereirão; Serra Talhada, Pernambuco state
- Capacity: 7,000
- President: José Raimundo Filho
- Head coach: Paulo Júnior
- Website: serratalhadafc.com
Home colors	Away colors	Third colors

Serra Talhada Futebol Clube, commonly known as Serra Talhada, is a Brazilian football club based in Serra Talhada, Pernambuco state.

Founded on February 25, 2011, is the successor to Serrano Futebol Clube, inactive since 2010.

== History ==
The club was founded on February 25, 2011. They won the Campeonato Pernambucano Second Level in 2011, thus they were promoted to the 2012 Campeonato Pernambucano.

== Stadium ==
Serra Talhada plays their home matches at the Estádio Nildo Pereira de Menezes, which has a capacity of 7,000 seats.

== Achievements ==
- Campeonato Pernambucano Second Level:
  - Winners (1): 2011

== Current squad (some players) ==
Source: Note: Flags indicate national team as defined under FIFA eligibility rules; some limited exceptions apply. Players may hold more than one non-FIFA nationality.

No.	Pos.	Nation	Player
—	GK	BRA	Carlos
—	GK	BRA	Diego Ribeiro
—	DF	BRA	Alex
—	DF	BRA	Josias
—	DF	BRA	Negreti
—	DF	BRA	Parral
—	DF	BRA	Ranieri
—	DF	BRA	Rogério
—	MF	BRA	Da Silva
—	MF	BRA	Diego Pessoa
—	MF	BRA	Enercino
—	MF	BRA	Juninho

No.	Pos.	Nation	Player
—	MF	BRA	Júnior Negão
—	MF	BRA	Otacílio
—	FW	BRA	Cristiano
—		BRA	Álisson
—		BRA	Binho
—		BRA	Aílton
—		BRA	José
—		BRA	Tete
—		BRA	Neeskens Santos
—		BRA	Júnior Paulista
—		BRA	Kássio

== Performance competitions ==
=== Campeonato Pernambucano - Série A2 ===
Year	Position
2011	
