= América Futebol Clube (PE) =

América
- Full name: América Futebol Clube
- Nicknames: Mequinha; Campeão do Centenário (Champion of the Century); Alvi-Verde da Estrada do Arraial (Arraial Road's Green & White); Verdão do Arraial (Arraial's Big Green); Periquito (Parakeet)
- Founded: April 12, 1914 (111 years ago)
- Ground: Cunhão, Paulista, Pernambuco state, Brazil
- Capacity: 12,000
- President: João Antônio Moreira
- Head Coach: Emilio Cugnier
- League: Campeonato Pernambucano Série A2
- 2025: Pernambucano Série A2, 2nd of 10
- Website: www.americafcpe.com.br
Home colours	Away colours	Third colours

América Futebol Clube, commonly known as América or as América-PE, is a Brazilian football club based in Recife, Pernambuco state. They won the Campeonato Pernambucano six times.

== History ==
The club was founded on April 12, 1914. They won the Campeonato Pernambucano in 1918, 1919, 1921, 1922, 1927, and 1944.

== Stadium ==
América Futebol Clube play their home games at Estádio Ademir Cunha, nicknamed Cunhão. The stadium has a maximum capacity of 12,000 people.

== Honours ==
=== Regional ===
- Troféu Nordeste
  - Winners (1): 1923

=== State ===
- Campeonato Pernambucano
  - Winners (6): 1918, 1919, 1921, 1922, 1927, 1944
  - Runners-up (9): 1923, 1924, 1930, 1941, 1945, 1947, 1948, 1950, 1952
- Campeonato Pernambucano Série A3
  - Winners (1): 2024
- Torneio Incentivo
  - Winners (1): 1976
- Torneio Início de Pernambuco
  - Winners (11): 1921, 1930, 1931, 1934, 1936, 1938, 1941, 1943, 1955, 1967, 1970
