= Central Sport Club =

Association football club in Brazil

Central
- Full name: Central Sport Club
- Nicknames: Alvinegro (The Black & White); Patativa do Agreste (The Patativa of the Agreste); Central de Caruaru
- Founded: 15 June 1919; 107 years ago
- Ground: Lacerdão
- Capacity: 20,000
- League: Campeonato Brasileiro Série D Campeonato Pernambucano Série A2
- 2025 2025: Série D, 14th of 64; Pernambucano, 8th of 10 (relegated)
Home colours	Away colours

Central Sport Club, usually known simply as Central, is a Brazilian football club. Based in Caruaru, Pernambuco state, the club competes in the Série D.

== History ==
On June 15, 1919, at Sociedade Musical Comercial Caruaruense, the club was founded by Francisco Porto de Oliveira and the club name was a suggestion by Severino Bezerra.

In 1986, Central competed in the Campeonato Brasileiro Série B, which was named Taça de Prata and Torneio Paralelo. The club won its group and was promoted to the same year's first level. However, the club finished in the last position of its Série A group, and was relegated to the following year's second level.

== Current squad ==
As of 4 May 2020

Note: Flags indicate national team as defined under FIFA eligibility rules; some limited exceptions apply. Players may hold more than one non-FIFA nationality.

No.	Pos.	Nation	Player
—	GK	BRA	Jerfesson
—	GK	BRA	Léo
—	GK	BRA	Rander
—	DF	BRA	William Paulista
—	DF	BRA	Rangerson
—	DF	BRA	Allan Miguel
—	DF	BRA	André Lima
—	DF	BRA	Hebert
—	DF	BRA	Evandro
—	DF	BRA	Wendel
—	DF	BRA	Luan
—	MF	BRA	Janderson

No.	Pos.	Nation	Player
—	MF	BRA	Esdras
—	MF	BRA	Vitor
—	MF	BRA	Gustavo Henrique Engel
—	MF	BRA	Fábio Neves
—	MF	BRA	Robinho
—	FW	BRA	Danilinho
—	FW	BRA	Leandro Costa
—	FW	BRA	Robinho
—	FW	BRA	Caíque

== Honours ==
=== Official tournaments ===
State
Competitions	Titles	Seasons
Copa Pernambuco	1	2001
Campeonato Pernambucano Série A2	2	1999, 2022

=== Others tournaments ===
==== State ====
- Torneio Incentivo (3): 1973, 1974, 1975
- Torneio Início de Pernambuco (1): 1973

==== City ====
- Liga Esportiva Caruaruense (9): 1942, 1943, 1944, 1945, 1948, 1951, 1952, 1953, 1958

=== Runners-up ===
- Campeonato Pernambucano (2): 2007, 2018
- Copa Pernambuco (3): 1996, 1999, 2009
- Campeonato Pernambucano Série A2 (1): 2005

== Mascot ==
Central's mascot is the Patativa, the local name for the Plumbeous Seedeater; a bird that habitates the hilly and fertile region of the Agreste.
