= 2018 Clube Náutico Capibaribe season =

Náutico
2018 season
- Chairman: Edno Melo
- Manager: Roberto Fernandes; Dudu Capixaba (c); Márcio Goiano
- Stadium: Arena Pernambuco; Estádio dos Aflitos
- Série C: Quarter-final
- Pernambucano: Champions (22nd title)
- Copa do Nordeste: Group stage
- Copa do Brasil: Fourth round
- Top goalscorer: League: José Ortigoza (7); All: José Ortigoza (13)
Home colours	Away colours	Third colours

The 2018 season was Náutico's 118th season in the club's history. Náutico competed in the Campeonato Pernambucano, Copa do Nordeste, Copa do Brasil and Série C.

== Squad ==
Note: Flags indicate national team as defined under FIFA eligibility rules; some limited exceptions apply. Players may hold more than one non-FIFA nationality.

No.	Pos.	Nation	Player
1	GK	BRA	Bruno Ferreira
12	GK	BRA	Sergio
41	GK	BRA	Luiz Carlos
4	DF	BRA	Camutanga
2	DF	BRA	Bryan
4	DF	BRA	Bruno Camacho
3	DF	BRA	Rafael Ribeiro
13	DF	BRA	Breno
—	DF	BRA	Otávio
14	DF	BRA	Samuel
—	DF	BRA	Richard
—	DF	BRA	Gabriel
6	DF	BRA	Kevyn Lucas
88	DF	BRA	Tiago Costa
2	DF	BRA	Thiago Ennes
5	MF	BRA	Negretti
77	MF	BRA	Régis
14	MF	BRA	Josa
—	MF	PAR	Roa Giménez
17	MF	BRA	Cal

No.	Pos.	Nation	Player
15	MF	BRA	Luiz Henrique
8	MF	BRA	Jhonnatan
8	MF	BRA	Jobson
14	MF	BRA	Willian Gaúcho
—	MF	BRA	Christiano Xuxa
22	MF	BRA	Medina
90	MF	BRA	Lelê
17	MF	BRA	Júnior Timbó
7	MF	BRA	Clebinho
—	MF	BRA	Felipinho
—	FW	BRA	Vinícius
—	FW	BRA	Alison
—	FW	BRA	Gerônimo
—	FW	BRA	Leilson
19	FW	BRA	Odilávio
—	FW	BRA	William
—	FW	BRA	Erick
—	FW	BRA	Gilmar
16	FW	BRA	Robinho

== Statistics ==
=== Overall ===
Games played	48 (8 Copa do Nordeste, 14 Pernambucano, 6 Copa do Brasil, 20 Série C)
Games won	27 (6 Copa do Nordeste, 8 Pernambucano, 4 Copa do Brasil, 9 Série C)
Games drawn	11 (2 Copa do Nordeste, 5 Pernambucano, 1 Copa do Brasil, 5 Série C)
Games lost	10 (2 Copa do Nordeste, 1 Pernambucano, 1 Copa do Brasil, 6 Série C)
Goals scored	65
Goals conceded	52
Goal difference	+13
Best results (goal difference)	4–0 (H) v Salgueiro - Pernambucano - 2018.02.06
Worst result (goal difference)	0–4 (A) v Botafogo–PB - Série C - 2018.04.21
Top scorer	José Ortigoza (13)

Source: Náutico official website

=== Goalscorers ===
Place	Position	Nationality	Number	Name	Copa do Nordeste	Campeonato Pernambucano	Copa do Brasil	Série C	Other	Total
1	FW	(Paraguay)	30	José Ortigoza	0	4	2	7	0	13
2	FW	(Brazil)	8	Wallace Pernambucano	2	4	1	4	0	11
3	FW	(Brazil)	16	Robinho	1	2	0	6	0	9
4	MF	(Brazil)	8	Jobson	1	1	0	1	0	3
4	MF	(Brazil)	17	Júnior Timbó	0	2	1	0	0	3
4	FW	(Brazil)	80	Tharcysio	0	2	1	0	0	3
5	FW	(Brazil)	11	Dudu	0	0	0	2	0	2
5	FW	(Brazil)	11	Fernandinho	1	1	0	0	0	2
5	MF	(Brazil)	8	Jhonnatan	0	0	0	2	0	2
5	MF	(Brazil)	15	Luiz Henrique	0	0	0	2	0	2
5	FW	(Brazil)	19	Odilávio	0	2	0	0	0	2
5	DF	(Brazil)	3	Rafael Ribeiro	1	1	0	0	0	2
5	DF	(Brazil)	14	William Gaúcho	0	2	0	0	0	2
6	DF	(Brazil)	69	Assis	0	0	0	1	0	1
6	DF	(Brazil)	4	Bruno Camacho	0	1	0	0	0	1
6	DF	(Brazil)	2	Bryan	0	0	0	1	0	1
6	DF	(Brazil)	4	Camutanga	0	0	1	0	0	1
6	MF	(Brazil)	7	Clebinho	1	0	0	0	0	1
6	MF	(Paraguay)	17	Jorge Jimenez	0	0	0	1	0	1
6	FW	(Brazil)	11	Rafael Assis	1	0	0	0	0	1
6	FW	(Brazil)	11	Thiago	0	0	0	0	1	1
				Own goals	0	1	0	1	0	2
				Total	8	23	6	28	1	66

=== Home record ===
São Lourenço da Mata	Recife
Arena Pernambuco	Estádio dos Aflitos
Capacity: 44,300	Capacity: 19,800
24 matches (19 wins 4 draws 1 loss)	1 match (1 win)

== Friendlies ==
16 December 2018	Náutico (Brazil)	1–0	(Argentina) Newell's Old Boys	Recife
17:00 (UTC-3)	Thiago 3'	Report		Stadium: Estádio Eládio de Barros Carvalho (Aflitos); Attendance: 17,357; Referee: Péricles Bassols

== Official Competitions ==
=== Copa do Nordeste ===
==== Qualifying stage ====
8 January 2018	Itabaiana	0–0	Náutico	Itabaiana
21:00 (UTC-3)		Report		Stadium: Estádio Etelvino Mendonça; Referee: Luiz César de Oliveira Magalhães

13 January 2018	Náutico	0–0 (5–4 p)	Itabaiana	São Lourenço da Mata
17:00 (UTC-3)		Report		Stadium: Estádio Governador Carlos Wilson Campos (Arena Pernambuco); Referee: Pablo dos Santos Alves
	Penalties
	Penalty scored		Penalty scored

==== Group stage ====
17 January 2018 1	Náutico	2–2	Altos	São Lourenço da Mata
20:00 (UTC-3)	Fernandinho 20'; Wallace Pernambucano 30'	Report	Leone 26'; Dudu Beberibe 58'	Stadium: Estádio Governador Carlos Wilson Campos (Arena Pernambuco); Attendance: 1,350; Referee: Denis da Silva Ribeiro Serafim

8 February 2018 2	Botafogo–PB	2–1	Náutico	João Pessoa
22:15 (UTC-3)	Gladstone 9'; Marcos Aurélio 45+1'	Report	Wallace Pernambucano 4'	Stadium: Estádio José Américo de Almeida Filho (Almeidão); Attendance: 6,653; Referee: Diego da Silva

22 February 2018 3	Bahia	2–1	Náutico	Salvador
21:45 (UTC-3)	Vina 30'; Edigar Junio 63'	Report	Clebinho 85'	Stadium: Itaipava Arena Fonte Nova; Attendance: 7,941; Referee: Caio Max Augusto Vieira

10 March 2018 4	Náutico	1–0	Bahia	São Lourenço da Mata
16:00 (UTC-3)	Robinho 10'	Report		Stadium: Estádio Governador Carlos Wilson Campos (Arena Pernambuco); Attendance: 3,056; Referee: Francisco Carlos do Nascimento

22 March 2018 5	Náutico	1–0	Botafogo–PB	São Lourenço da Mata
21:15 (UTC-3)	Rafael Assis 35'	Report		Stadium: Estádio Governador Carlos Wilson Campos (Arena Pernambuco); Attendance: 2,544; Referee: Claudio Francisco Lima e Silva

29 March 2018 6	Altos	2–2	Náutico	Teresina
21:45 (UTC-3)	Dos Santos 26'; Manoel 37'	Report	Rafael Ribeiro 13'; Jobson 45+1'	Stadium: Estádio Governador Alberto Tavares Silva (Albertão); Attendance: 529; Referee: Avelar Rodrigo da Silva

==== Record ====
Final Position	Points	Matches	Wins	Draws	Losses	Goals For	Goals Away	Avg%
9th	8	6	2	2	2	8	8	44%

=== Campeonato Pernambucano ===
==== First stage ====
19 January 2018 1	Náutico	3–2	América–PE	São Lourenço da Mata
20:00 (UTC-3)	Fernandinho 6'; William Gaúcho 37', 90+3'	Report	Caxito 32', 75'	Stadium: Estádio Governador Carlos Wilson Campos (Arena Pernambuco); Attendance: 929; Referee: Gilberto Castro Junior

21 January 2018 2	Central	3–0	Náutico	Caruaru
16:00 (UTC-3)	Douglas Carioca 3'; Graxa 49'; Luizão 80'	Report		Stadium: Estádio Luiz José de Lacerda (Lacerdão); Referee: Luiz Sobral

24 January 2018 3	Náutico	3–0	Sport	São Lourenço da Mata
22:30 (UTC-3)	Wallace Pernambucano 12', 42'; Tharcysio 90+2'	Report		Stadium: Estádio Governador Carlos Wilson Campos (Arena Pernambuco); Attendance: 3,685; Referee: Péricles Bassols Cortez

28 January 2018 4	Vitória das Tabocas	1–1	Náutico	São Lourenço da Mata
16:00 (UTC-3)	Thomas Anderson 19'	Report	Wallace Pernambucano 65' (pen.)	Stadium: Estádio Governador Carlos Wilson Campos (Arena Pernambuco); Attendance: 1,592; Referee: Sebastião Rufino Ribeiro Filho

3 February 2018 5	Pesqueira	1–1	Náutico	Pesqueira
20:00 (UTC-3)	Daniel Tavares 15'	Report	Tharcysio 60'	Stadium: Estádio Joaquim José de Brito; Attendance: 1,357; Referee: Diego Fernando Silva

6 February 2018 6	Náutico	4–0	Salgueiro	São Lourenço da Mata
20:00 (UTC-3)	Júnior Timbó 45' (pen.); Rafael Ribeiro 58'; Robinho 67'; Odilávio 76'	Report		Stadium: Estádio Governador Carlos Wilson Campos (Arena Pernambuco); Attendance: 1,009; Referee: Tiago Nascimento dos Santos

17 February 2018 7	Santa Cruz	0–0	Náutico	Recife
18:30 (UTC-3)		Report		Stadium: Estádio José do Rego Maciel (Arruda); Attendance: 6,015; Referee: Luiz Sobral

20 February 2018 8	Náutico	2–1	Afogados da Ingazeira	São Lourenço da Mata
20:00 (UTC-3)	Ortigoza 75' (pen.); Robinho 89'	Report	Tarcísio 84' (pen.)	Stadium: Estádio Governador Carlos Wilson Campos (Arena Pernambuco); Referee: Rodrigo José Pereira

26 February 2018 9	Náutico	1–0	Flamengo de Arcoverde	São Lourenço da Mata
20:00 (UTC-3)	Odilávio 67'	Report		Stadium: Estádio Governador Carlos Wilson Campos (Arena Pernambuco); Attendance: 1,140; Referee: Gleydson Leite

7 March 2018 10	Belo Jardim	2–2	Náutico	Belo Jardim
21:45 (UTC-3)	Jader 6' (pen.); Luan 20'	Report	Ortigoza 14'; Wallace Pernambucano 67'	Stadium: Estádio José Bezerra de Mendonça; Attendance: 1,230; Referee: Gleydson Ferreira

==== Quarter-final ====
18 March 2018	Náutico	1–0	Afogados da Ingazeira	São Lourenço da Mata
16:00 (UTC-3)	Júnior Timbó 68' (pen.)	Report		Stadium: Estádio Governador Carlos Wilson Campos (Arena Pernambuco); Attendance: 18,136; Referee: Gilberto Castro Junior

==== Semi-final ====
25 March 2018	Náutico	3–2	Salgueiro	São Lourenço da Mata
16:00 (UTC-3)	Luís Eduardo 41' (o.g.); Ortigoza 64'; Bruno Camacho 90'	Report	Dadá Belmonte 24' (pen.); Maurício 90+3'	Stadium: Estádio Governador Carlos Wilson Campos (Arena Pernambuco); Attendance: 20,446; Referee: Tiago Nascimento dos Santos

==== Finals ====
1 April 2018	Central	0–0	Náutico	Caruaru
16:00 (UTC-3)		Report		Stadium: Estádio Luiz José de Lacerda (Lacerdão); Attendance: 14,080; Referee: Péricles Bassols

8 April 2018	Náutico	2–1	Central	São Lourenço da Mata
16:00 (UTC-3)	Ortigoza 44'; Jobson 58'	Report	Leandro Costa 72' (pen.)	Stadium: Estádio Governador Carlos Wilson Campos (Arena Pernambuco); Attendance: 42,350; Referee: Nielson Nogueira

==== Record ====
Final Position	Points	Matches	Wins	Draws	Losses	Goals For	Goals Away	Avg%
1st	29	14	8	5	1	23	13	69%

=== Copa do Brasil ===
==== First stage ====
31 January 2018	Cordino	1–1	Náutico	São Luís
21:30 (UTC-3)	Ulisses 29' (pen.)	Report	Camutanga 81'	Stadium: Estádio Governador João Castelo (Castelão); Attendance: 272; Referee: Andrey da Silva e Silva

==== Second stage ====
14 February 2018	Fluminense de Feira	0–1	Náutico	Feira de Santana
22:30 (UTC-3)		Report	Wallace Pernambucano 27'	Stadium: Estádio Municipal Alberto Oliveira (Joia da Princesa); Attendance: 3,968; Referee: Renan Roberto de Souza

==== Third stage ====
28 February 2018	Náutico	2–1	Cuiabá	São Lourenço da Mata
19:30 (UTC-3)	Ortigoza 57'; Tharcysio 77'	Report	Doda 68'	Stadium: Estádio Governador Carlos Wilson Campos (Arena Pernambuco); Attendance: 5,302; Referee: Wanderson Alves de Sousa

14 March 2018	Cuiabá	0–1	Náutico	Cuiabá
21:45 (UTC-3)		Report	Ortigoza 85'	Stadium: Arena Pantanal; Attendance: 0 Referee: Emerson de Almeida Ferreira

==== Fourth stage ====
11 April 2018	Ponte Preta	3–0	Náutico	Campinas
21:45 (UTC-3)	Orinho 15'; Felipe Saraiva 20'; Júnior Santos 26'	Report		Stadium: Estádio Moisés Lucarelli; Attendance: 3,541; Referee: Daniel Nobre Bins

18 April 2018	Náutico	1–0	Ponte Preta	São Lourenço da Mata
21:45 (UTC-3)	Júnior Timbó 82' (pen.)	Report		Stadium: Estádio Governador Carlos Wilson Campos (Arena Pernambuco); Attendance: 1,347; Referee: Alisson Sidnei Furtado

==== Record ====
Final Position	Points	Matches	Wins	Draws	Losses	Goals For	Goals Away	Avg%
20th	13	6	4	1	1	6	5	72%

=== Série C ===
==== First stage ====
15 April 2018 1	Náutico	1–1	Santa Cruz	São Lourenço da Mata
19:00 (UTC-3)	Ortigoza 26'	Report	Jeremias 82'	Stadium: Estádio Governador Carlos Wilson Campos (Arena Pernambuco); Attendance: 3,204; Referee: Felipe Gomes da Silva

21 April 2018 2	Botafogo–PB	4–0	Náutico	João Pessoa
19:00 (UTC-3)	Marcos Aurélio 5', 90+3'; Mário Sérgio 70'; Dico 75'	Report		Stadium: Estádio José Américo de Almeida Filho (Almeidão); Attendance: 5,119; Referee: Marco Aurelio Fazekas

29 April 2018 3	Atlético Acreano	1–0	Náutico	Rio Branco
19:00 (UTC-5)	Eduardo 54'	Report		Stadium: Estádio Antônio Aquino Lopes (Florestão); Attendance: 1,212; Referee: Valdicleuson Silva da Costa

5 May 2018 4	Náutico	2–4	Confiança	São Lourenço da Mata
20:00 (UTC-3)	Robinho 52', 78'	Report	Léo Ceará 25', 54'; Ângelo 62'; Éverton 64'	Stadium: Estádio Governador Carlos Wilson Campos (Arena Pernambuco); Attendance: 2,973; Referee: Douglas Marques das Flores

12 May 2018 5	Náutico	3–0	Salgueiro	São Lourenço da Mata
19:00 (UTC-3)	Robinho 12'; Ortigoza 17', 42'	Report		Stadium: Estádio Governador Carlos Wilson Campos (Arena Pernambuco); Attendance: 2,184; Referee: André Luiz de Freitas Castro

19 May 2018 6	Juazeirense	2–0	Náutico	Juazeiro
16:00 (UTC-3)	Jussimar 24'; Victor Sapo 43'	Report		Stadium: Estádio Adauto Moraes; Attendance: 873; Referee: João Batista de Arruda

27 May 2018 7	Náutico	2–0	Globo	São Lourenço da Mata
19:00 (UTC-3)	Ortigoza 33'; Jhonnatan 90+1'	Report		Stadium: Estádio Governador Carlos Wilson Campos (Arena Pernambuco); Attendance: 1,305; Referee: Marcelo Aparecido Ribeiro de Souza

2 June 2018 8	ABC	2–0	Náutico	Natal
16:00 (UTC-3)	Higor Leite 13'; Vitinho 86'	Report		Stadium: Estádio Maria Lamas Farache (Frasqueirão); Attendance: 5,108; Referee: Carlos Eduardo Nunes Braga

9 June 2018 9	Náutico	3–2	Remo	São Lourenço da Mata
16:00 (UTC-3)	Robinho 48'; Jhonnatan 81'; Wallace Pernambucano 87'	Report	Esquerdinha 52'; Elielton 90+3'	Stadium: Estádio Governador Carlos Wilson Campos (Arena Pernambuco); Attendance: 2,644; Referee: Salim Fende Chavez

18 June 2018 10	Santa Cruz	0–1	Náutico	Recife
21:15 (UTC-3)		Report	Wallace Pernambucano 71'	Stadium: Estádio José do Rego Maciel (Arruda); Attendance: 6,505; Referee: Edmar Campos Encarnação

25 June 2018 11	Náutico	2–0	Botafogo–PB	São Lourenço da Mata
19:15 (UTC-3)	Dudu 3'; Wálber 86' (o.g.)	Report		Stadium: Estádio Governador Carlos Wilson Campos (Arena Pernambuco); Attendance: 3,703; Referee: Jefferson Ferreira de Morães

30 June 2018 12	Náutico	3–1	Atlético Acreano	São Lourenço da Mata
18:00 (UTC-3)	Assis 40'; Dudu 48'; Jobson 78'	Report	Rafael 37'	Stadium: Estádio Governador Carlos Wilson Campos (Arena Pernambuco); Attendance: 5,495; Referee: Heber Roberto Lopes

7 July 2018 13	Confiança	2–3	Náutico	Aracaju
21:00 (UTC-3)	Léo Ceará 13'; Raí 86'	Report	Robinho 32'; Bryan 60'; Luiz Henrique 63'	Stadium: Estádio Lourival Baptista (Batistão); Attendance: 3,081; Referee: Salim Fende Chavez

16 July 2018 14	Salgueiro	1–1	Náutico	Salgueiro
21:15 (UTC-3)	Dadá Belmonte 85'	Report	Robinho 36'	Stadium: Estádio Cornélio de Barros; Attendance: 1,064; Referee: Roger Goulart

21 July 2018 15	Náutico	1–0	Juazeirense	São Lourenço da Mata
17:00 (UTC-3)	Ortigoza 90+5'	Report		Stadium: Estádio Governador Carlos Wilson Campos (Arena Pernambuco); Attendance: 7,514; Referee: Diego da Silva Castro

27 July 2018 16	Globo	1–1	Náutico	Ceará-Mirim
20:00 (UTC-3)	Geovane 29'	Report	Wallace Pernambucano 90+1'	Stadium: Estádio Manoel Dantas Barretto (Barrettão); Attendance: 567; Referee: Marcos Mateus Pereira

4 August 2018 17	Náutico	2–0	ABC	São Lourenço da Mata
16:00 (UTC-3)	Ortigoza 78'; Luiz Henrique 88'	Report		Stadium: Estádio Governador Carlos Wilson Campos (Arena Pernambuco); Attendance: 13,405; Referee: Daniel Nobre Bins

11 August 2018 18	Remo	1–1	Náutico	Belém
19:30 (UTC-3)	Dedeco 5'	Report	Jimenez 23'	Stadium: Estádio Olímpico do Pará (Mangueirão); Attendance: 19,371; Referee: Jean Pierre Gonçalves Lima

==== Quarter-finals ====
18 August 2018	Bragantino	3–1	Náutico	Braganca Paulista
16:00 (UTC-3)	Vitinho 28'; Marquinhos 45+1'; Fabiano 54'	Report	Ortigoza 73'	Stadium: Estádio Nabi Abi Chedid; Attendance: 3,624; Referee: Anderson Daronco

26 August 2018	Náutico	1–1	Bragantino	São Lourenço da Mata
17:00 (UTC-3)	Wallace Pernambucano 83'	Report	Matheus Peixoto 33'	Stadium: Estádio Governador Carlos Wilson Campos (Arena Pernambuco); Attendance: 27,469; Referee: Wagner do Nascimento Magalhães

==== Record ====
Final Position	Points	Matches	Wins	Draws	Losses	Goals For	Goals Away	Avg%
5th	32	20	9	5	6	28	26	53%
