= Jean Carlo (footballer, born 1993) =

Brazilian footballer

Personal information
- Full name: Jean Carlo Bernieri Fernandes
- Date of birth: 8 June 1993 (age 33)
- Place of birth: Sertão, Brazil
- Height: 1.75 m (5 ft 9 in)
- Position: Left winger

Youth career
- –2012: Olé Brasil

Senior career*
Years	Team	Apps	(Gls)
2012	Comercial-SP		
2013	Ypiranga-RS		
2013	Cerâmica		
2014–2015	Juventude	0	(0)
2014–2015	→ Brasil de Farroupilha (loan)	2	(0)
2016	Caxias	10	(0)
2016	Brasil de Farroupilha	4	(0)
2017–2022	Operário Ferroviário	123	(18)
2020	→ São Luiz (loan)	12	(2)
2023	Portuguesa-RJ	2	(0)
2023	CSA	10	(2)
2023	Manaus	6	(0)
2024	Avenida	10	(8)
2024	Água Santa	6	(0)
2025	Aymorés	6	(0)
2025	Valerio	10	(1)
- * Club domestic league appearances and goals as of 17 August 2024

Jean Carlo Bernieri Fernandes (born 8 June 1993), simply known as Jean Carlo, is a Brazilian professional footballer who plays as a left winger.

== Career ==
Left winger, Jean Carlo made a name for himself playing for Operário Ferrovário EC, where he made 123 appearances and scored 18 goals, playing in winning the Série C and D titles. He later played for Portuguesa-RJ, CSA, Manaus, Avenida and Água Santa.

In the 2025 season, Jean Carlo played for the Minas Gerais teams Aymorés and Valeriodoce.

== Honours ==
Operário Ferroviário

- Campeonato Brasileiro Série C: 2018
- Campeonato Brasileiro Série D: 2017
- Campeonato Paranaense Série Prata: 2018
