= 2018 Campeonato Brasileiro Série C =

Campeonato Brasileiro Série C
- Season: 2018
- Champions: Operário Ferroviário (1st title)
- Promoted: Botafogo-SP; Bragantino; Cuiabá; Operário Ferroviário
- Relegated: Joinville; Juazeirense; Salgueiro; Tupi
- Matches played: 194
- Goals scored: 456 (2.35 per match)
- Top goalscorer: Caio Dantas (11 goals)
- Biggest home win: Atlético Acreano 5–0 Juazeirense; R5, 13 May; Cuiabá 5–0 Joinville; R14, 14 July
- Biggest away win: Remo 0–3 Confiança; R6, 20 May; Ypiranga 0–3 Botafogo-SP; R8, 3 June; Tupi 0–3 Bragantino; R11, 23 June; ABC 0–3 Santa Cruz; R12, 1 July; Atlético Acreano 0–3 Confiança; R17, 5 August; Botafogo-SP 0–3 Cuiabá; Semifinals 2nd leg, 8 September
- Highest attendance: 34,474 Santa Cruz 1–0 Operário Ferroviário; Quarter-finals 1st leg, 19 August
- Lowest attendance: 96 Ypiranga 3–0 Cuiabá; R16, 29 July
- Total attendance: 605,023
- Average attendance: 3,119

The 2018 Campeonato Brasileiro Série C was a football competition held in Brazil, equivalent to the third division. The competition started on 14 April and ended on 22 September 2018.

Twenty teams competed in the tournament, twelve returning from the 2017 season, four promoted from the 2017 Campeonato Brasileiro Série D (Operário Ferroviário, Globo, Atlético Acreano and Juazeirense), and four relegated from the 2017 Campeonato Brasileiro Série B (Luverdense, Santa Cruz, ABC and Náutico).

Botafogo-SP, Bragantino, Cuiabá and Operário Ferroviário qualified for the semi-finals and were promoted to the 2019 Campeonato Brasileiro Série B.

Operário Ferroviário won the title after defeating Cuiabá in the final.

== Teams ==
Location of teams in 2018 Série C

Pos.	Relegated from 2017 Série B
17º	Luverdense
18º	Santa Cruz
19º	ABC
20º	Náutico

Pos.	Promoted from 2017 Série D
1º	Operário Ferroviário
2º	Globo
3°	Atlético Acreano
4º	Juazeirense

=== Number of teams by state ===
Number of teams	State	Team(s)
3	Pernambuco	Náutico, Salgueiro and Santa Cruz
2	Mato Grosso	Cuiabá and Luverdense
2	Minas Gerais	Tombense and Tupi
2	Rio Grande do Norte	ABC and Globo
2	São Paulo	Botafogo-SP and Bragantino
1	Acre	Atlético Acreano
1	Bahia	Juazeirense
1	Pará	Remo
1	Paraíba	Botafogo-PB
1	Paraná	Operário Ferroviário
1	Rio de Janeiro	Volta Redonda
1	Rio Grande do Sul	Ypiranga
1	Santa Catarina	Joinville
1	Sergipe	Confiança

== Personnel ==
Team	Home city	Manager
ABC	Natal	(Brazil) Ranielle Ribeiro
Atlético Acreano	Rio Branco	(Brazil) Álvaro Miguéis
Botafogo-PB	João Pessoa	(Brazil) Evaristo Piza
Botafogo-SP	Ribeirão Preto	(Brazil) Léo Condé
Bragantino	Bragança Paulista	(Brazil) Marcelo Veiga
Confiança	Aracaju	(Brazil) Betinho
Cuiabá	Cuiabá	(Brazil) Itamar Schülle
Globo	Ceará-Mirim	(Brazil) Higor César
Joinville	Joinville	(Brazil) Pedrinho Maradona
Juazeirense	Juazeiro	(Brazil) Evandro Guimarães
Luverdense	Lucas do Rio Verde	(Brazil) Maico Gaúcho
Náutico	Recife	(Brazil) Márcio Goiano
Operário Ferroviário	Ponta Grossa	(Brazil) Gerson Gusmão
Remo	Belém	(Brazil) Netão
Salgueiro	Salgueiro	(Brazil) Sérgio China
Santa Cruz	Recife	(Brazil) Roberto Fernandes
Tombense	Tombos	(Brazil) Eugênio Souza
Tupi	Juiz de Fora	(Brazil) Aílton Ferraz
Volta Redonda	Volta Redonda	(Brazil) Moacir Júnior
Ypiranga	Erechim	(Brazil) Márcio Nunes

== Group stage ==
In the group stage, each group was played on a home-and-away round-robin basis. The teams were ranked according to points (3 points for a win, 1 point for a draw, and 0 points for a loss). If tied on points, the following criteria would be used to determine the ranking: 1. Wins; 2. Goal difference; 3. Goals scored; 4. Head-to-head (if the tie is only between two teams). If tied on aggregate, the away goals rule would be used (except if both teams shared the same stadium); 5. Fewest red cards; 6. Fewest yellow cards; 7. Draw in the headquarters of the Brazilian Football Confederation (Regulations Article 15).

The top four teams of each group advanced to the quarter-finals of the knockout stages.

=== Group A ===
Pos	Team	Pld	W	D	L	GF	GA	GD	Pts	Qualification or relegation
1	Náutico	18	9	4	5	26	22	+4	31	Advance to Final stages
2	Atlético Acreano	18	9	3	6	25	22	+3	30	Advance to Final stages
3	Santa Cruz	18	7	7	4	22	13	+9	28	Advance to Final stages
4	Botafogo-PB	18	6	8	4	22	17	+5	26	Advance to Final stages
5	Confiança	18	5	8	5	24	25	−1	23	
6	Remo	18	6	4	8	18	20	−2	22	
7	Globo	18	4	10	4	19	19	0	22	
8	ABC	18	6	3	9	18	24	−6	21	
9	Juazeirense	18	4	7	7	16	20	−4	19	Relegation to 2019 Campeonato Brasileiro Série D
10	Salgueiro	18	3	8	7	11	19	−8	17	Relegation to 2019 Campeonato Brasileiro Série D

Source: CBF

==== Results ====
Home \ Away	ABC	AAC	BOT	CON	GLO	JZE	NAU	REM	SAL	STA
ABC	—	0–1	2–0	4–0	1–3	1–0	2–0	2–1	2–0	0–3
Atlético Acreano	3–0	—	1–0	0–3	1–1	5–0	1–0	1–0	2–1	2–1
Botafogo-PB	2–0	1–0	—	2–0	1–1	2–2	4–0	1–3	0–0	2–0
Confiança	2–2	0–0	2–2	—	0–0	1–1	2–3	0–2	3–0	1–1
Globo	1–0	2–1	1–1	1–1	—	1–1	1–1	3–1	1–1	1–2
Juazeirense	2–2	4–0	1–1	0–1	2–0	—	2–0	1–0	0–0	0–0
Náutico	2–0	3–1	2–0	2–4	2–0	1–0	—	3–2	3–0	1–1
Remo	1–0	2–2	0–0	0–3	1–0	3–0	1–1	—	0–1	0–0
Salgueiro	3–0	1–3	0–0	1–1	1–1	1–0	1–1	0–1	—	0–0
Santa Cruz	0–0	3–1	2–3	4–0	1–1	1–0	0–1	2–0	1–0	—

Source: CBF
Legend: Blue = home team win; Yellow = draw; Red = away team win.

=== Group B ===
Pos	Team	Pld	W	D	L	GF	GA	GD	Pts	Qualification or relegation
1	(São Paulo (state)) Botafogo-SP	18	10	5	3	30	14	+16	35	Advance to Final stages
2	(Paraná (state)) Operário Ferroviário	18	10	5	3	25	17	+8	35	Advance to Final stages
3	(Mato Grosso) Cuiabá	18	10	2	6	32	21	+11	32	Advance to Final stages
4	(São Paulo (state)) Bragantino	18	8	5	5	21	16	+5	29	Advance to Final stages
5	(Mato Grosso) Luverdense	18	7	3	8	27	25	+2	24	
6	(Minas Gerais) Tombense	18	6	4	8	17	17	0	22	
7	(Rio Grande do Sul) Ypiranga	18	6	4	8	25	27	−2	22	
8	(Rio de Janeiro (state)) Volta Redonda	18	6	2	10	18	25	−7	20	
9	(Minas Gerais) Tupi	18	6	2	10	19	30	−11	20	Relegation to Série D
10	(Santa Catarina (state)) Joinville	18	4	2	12	13	35	−22	14	Relegation to Série D

Source: CBF

==== Results ====
Home \ Away	BOT	BRA	CUI	JEC	LUV	OPE	TOM	TUP	VRE	YPI
Botafogo-SP	—	1–1	0–0	3–0	3–1	2–2	1–0	4–2	2–0	2–0
Bragantino	0–2	—	2–1	2–0	1–1	0–0	2–1	1–0	0–1	2–1
Cuiabá	2–1	0–1	—	5–0	1–0	4–0	2–1	1–0	3–0	1–2
Joinville	0–2	0–2	2–3	—	4–2	1–3	3–1	1–1	1–0	1–0
Luverdense	1–2	3–1	1–3	2–0	—	1–0	2–0	3–0	4–1	2–2
Operário Ferroviário	3–1	1–1	1–1	2–0	3–2	—	1–1	2–0	1–0	2–1
Tombense	0–0	1–0	3–2	3–0	1–1	0–1	—	0–1	1–0	2–0
Tupi	1–1	0–3	1–3	2–0	0–1	0–1	1–0	—	2–1	4–1
Volta Redonda	1–0	2–1	3–0	0–0	2–0	0–1	0–2	2–3	—	3–2
Ypiranga	0–3	1–1	3–0	2–0	1–0	2–1	0–0	5–1	2–2	—

Source: CBF
Legend: Blue = home team win; Yellow = draw; Red = away team win.

== Final Stages ==
Starting from the quarter-finals, the teams played a single-elimination tournament with the following rules:

- Each tie was played on a home-and-away two-legged basis, with the higher-seeded team hosting the second leg (Regulations Article 17).
- If tied on aggregate, the away goals rule would not be used, extra time would not be played, and the penalty shoot-out was used to determine the winner (Regulations Article 16).

Starting from the semi-finals, the teams were seeded according to their performance in the tournament. The teams were ranked according to overall points. If tied on overall points, the following criteria would be used to determine the ranking: 1. Overall wins; 2. Overall goal difference; 3. Draw in the headquarters of the Brazilian Football Confederation (Regulations Article 17).

=== Bracket ===
Quarter-finals
(São Paulo (state)) Bragantino	3	1	4
(Pernambuco) Náutico	1	1	2
(Pernambuco) Santa Cruz	1	0	1
(Paraná (state)) Operário Ferroviário	0	3	3
(Mato Grosso) Cuiabá	2	2	4
(Acre (state)) Atlético Acreano	0	2	2
(Paraíba) Botafogo-PB	1	0	1 (3)
(São Paulo (state)) Botafogo-SP (p)	0	1	1 (4)

Semi-finals
(São Paulo (state)) Bragantino	0	0	0 (2)
(Paraná (state)) Operário Ferroviário (p)	0	0	0 (4)
(Mato Grosso) Cuiabá	0	3	3
(São Paulo (state)) Botafogo-SP	0	0	0

Finals
(Paraná (state)) Operário Ferroviário	3	1	4
(Mato Grosso) Cuiabá	3	0	3

=== Quarter-finals ===
The matches were played between 18 and 27 August 2018.

Team 1	Agg.	Team 2	1st leg	2nd leg
Bragantino (São Paulo (state))	4–2	(Pernambuco) Náutico	3–1	1–1
Santa Cruz (Pernambuco)	1–3	(Paraná (state)) Operário Ferroviário	1–0	0–3
Cuiabá (Mato Grosso)	4–2	(Acre (state)) Atlético Acreano	2–0	2–2
Botafogo-PB (Paraíba)	1–1 (3–4 p)	(São Paulo (state)) Botafogo-SP	1–0	0–1

==== Group C ====
18 August 2018	Bragantino (São Paulo (state))	3–1	(Pernambuco) Náutico	Estádio Nabi Abi Chedid, Bragança Paulista
16:00	Vitinho 28'; Marquinhos 45+1'; Fabiano 54'	Report	Ortigoza 73'	Attendance: 3,624; Referee: Anderson Daronco (Rio Grande do Sul)

26 August 2018	Náutico (Pernambuco)	1–1	(São Paulo (state)) Bragantino	Arena Pernambuco, São Lourenço da Mata
17:00	Wallace Pernambucano 83'	Report	Matheus Peixoto 33'	Attendance: 27,469; Referee: Wagner do Nascimento Magalhães (Rio de Janeiro)

Bragantino won 4–2 on aggregate and advanced to the semi-finals

==== Group D ====
19 August 2018	Santa Cruz (Pernambuco)	1–0	(Paraná (state)) Operário Ferroviário	Estádio do Arruda, Recife
17:00	Vítor 45'	Report		Attendance: 49,476; Referee: Wagner do Nascimento Magalhães (Rio de Janeiro)

26 August 2018	Operário Ferroviário (Paraná (state))	3–0	(Pernambuco) Santa Cruz	Estádio Germano Krüger, Ponta Grossa
15:00	Alisson 21'; Schumacher 72'; Dione 78'	Report		Attendance: 6,477; Referee: Raphael Claus (São Paulo)

Operário Ferroviário won 3–1 on aggregate and advanced to the semi-finals

==== Group E ====
20 August 2018	Cuiabá (Mato Grosso)	2–0	(Acre (state)) Atlético Acreano	Arena Pantanal, Cuiabá
21:00	Alê 36'; Edson Borges 87'	Report		Attendance: 24,895; Referee: Raphael Claus (São Paulo)

27 August 2018	Atlético Acreano (Acre (state))	2–2	(Mato Grosso) Cuiabá	Florestão, Rio Branco
21:00	Rafael Barros 81'; Diego 87'	Report	Alê 47'; Bruno Sávio 73'	Attendance: 6,740; Referee: Luiz Flávio de Oliveira (São Paulo)

Cuiabá won 4–2 on aggregate and advanced to the semi-finals

==== Group F ====
19 August 2018	Botafogo-PB (Paraíba)	1–0	(São Paulo (state)) Botafogo-SP	Almeidão, João Pessoa
19:00	Juninho 65'	Report		Attendance: 10,330; Referee: Wilton Sampaio (Goiás)

26 August 2018	Botafogo-SP (São Paulo (state))	1–0 (4–3 p)	(Paraíba) Botafogo-PB	Estádio Santa Cruz, Ribeirão Preto
19:00	Caio Dantas 90+3'	Report		Attendance: 23,950; Referee: Dewson Fernando Freitas da Silva (Pará)
	Penalties
	Tchô (penalty scored); Caio Dantas (penalty scored); Yuri (penalty scored); Éverton Santos (penalty missed); Felipe Augusto (penalty scored)		(penalty scored) Gedeílson; (penalty scored) Leandro Kivel; (penalty scored) Daniel Nazaré; (penalty missed) Juninho; (penalty missed) Marcos Aurélio

Tied 1–1 on aggregate, Botafogo-SP won on penalties and advanced to the semi-finals

=== Semi-finals ===
Pos	Team	Pld	W	D	L	GF	GA	GD	Pts	Host
2	(Paraná (state)) Operário Ferroviário	20	11	5	4	28	18	+10	38	2nd leg
4	(São Paulo (state)) Bragantino	20	9	6	5	25	18	+7	33	1st leg
1	(São Paulo (state)) Botafogo-SP	20	11	5	4	31	15	+16	38	2nd leg
3	(Mato Grosso) Cuiabá	20	11	3	6	36	23	+13	36	1st leg

Source: CBF

The matches were played between 1 and 9 September 2018.

Team 1	Agg.	Team 2	1st leg	2nd leg
Bragantino (São Paulo (state))	0–0 (2–4 p)	(Paraná (state)) Operário Ferroviário	0–0	0–0
Cuiabá (Mato Grosso)	3–0	(São Paulo (state)) Botafogo-SP	0–0	3–0

==== Group G ====
1 September 2018	Bragantino (São Paulo (state))	0–0	(Paraná (state)) Operário Ferroviário	Estádio Nabi Abi Chedid, Bragança Paulista
16:00		Report		Attendance: 7,000; Referee: Igor Junio Benevenuto (Minas Gerais)

9 September 2018	Operário Ferroviário (Paraná (state))	0–0 (4–2 p)	(São Paulo (state)) Bragantino	Estádio Germano Krüger, Ponta Grossa
15:30		Report		Attendance: 4,524; Referee: Bráulio da Silva Machado (Santa Catarina)
	Penalties
	Bruno Batata (penalty scored); Schumacher (penalty scored); Cleyton (penalty scored); Dione (penalty scored)		(penalty scored) Robertinho; (penalty missed) Rafael Chorão; (penalty missed) Guilherme Mattis; (penalty scored) Marquinhos

Tied 0–0 on aggregate, Operário Ferroviário won on penalties and advanced to the finals

==== Group H ====
2 September 2018	Cuiabá (Mato Grosso)	0–0	(São Paulo (state)) Botafogo-SP	Arena Pantanal, Cuiabá
19:00		Report		Attendance: 24,008; Referee: Sávio Pereira Sampaio (Distrito Federal)

8 September 2018	Botafogo-SP (São Paulo (state))	0–3	(Mato Grosso) Cuiabá	Estádio Santa Cruz, Ribeirão Preto
17:00		Report	Jenison 3', 74'; Danilo 34'	Attendance: 11,366; Referee: Bruno Arleu de Araújo (Rio de Janeiro)

Cuiabá won 3–0 on aggregate and advanced to the finals

=== Finals ===
Pos	Team	Pld	W	D	L	GF	GA	GD	Pts	Host
1	(Mato Grosso) Cuiabá	22	12	4	6	39	23	+16	40	2nd leg
2	(Paraná (state)) Operário Ferroviário	22	11	7	4	28	18	+10	40	1st leg

Source: CBF

The matches were played on 16 and 22 September 2018.

Team 1	Agg.	Team 2	1st leg	2nd leg
Operário Ferroviário (Paraná (state))	4–3	(Mato Grosso) Cuiabá	3–3	1–0

==== Group I ====
16 September 2018	Operário Ferroviário (Paraná (state))	3–3	(Mato Grosso) Cuiabá	Estádio Germano Krüger, Ponta Grossa
15:30	Dione 1'; Erick 45'; Robinho 90'	Report	Marino 49', 64'; Jenison 66'	Attendance: 5,439; Referee: Leandro Vuaden (Rio Grande do Sul)

22 September 2018	Cuiabá (Mato Grosso)	0–1	(Paraná (state)) Operário Ferroviário	Arena Pantanal, Cuiabá
19:00		Report	Bruno Batata 54'	Attendance: 41,311; Referee: Marcelo de Lima Henrique (Rio de Janeiro)

== Top goalscorers ==
Rank	Player	Team	Goals
1	Caio Dantas	(São Paulo (state)) Botafogo-SP	11
2	Felipe Augusto	(São Paulo (state)) Botafogo-SP	9
2	Léo Ceará	(Sergipe) Confiança	9
2	Marino	(Mato Grosso) Cuiabá	9
5	Rafael Barros	(Acre (state)) Atlético Acreano	8
6	Eduardo	(Acre (state)) Atlético Acreano	7
6	Eduardo Ramos	(Mato Grosso) Cuiabá	7
6	Jenison	(Mato Grosso) Cuiabá	7
6	José Ortigoza	(Pernambuco) Náutico	7
10	Marcos Aurélio	(Paraíba) Botafogo-PB	6
10	Neto	(Acre (state)) Atlético Acreano	6
10	Patrick Carvalho	(Minas Gerais) Tupi	6
10	Paulo Renê	(Mato Grosso) Luverdense	6
10	Pipico	(Pernambuco) Santa Cruz	6
10	Robinho	(Pernambuco) Náutico	6
10	Romarinho	(Rio Grande do Norte) Globo	6

Source:CBF
