= Barreiras Formation =

Geologic formation in Brazil

Barreiras Formation Barreiras Group
- Stratigraphic range: Cenozoic
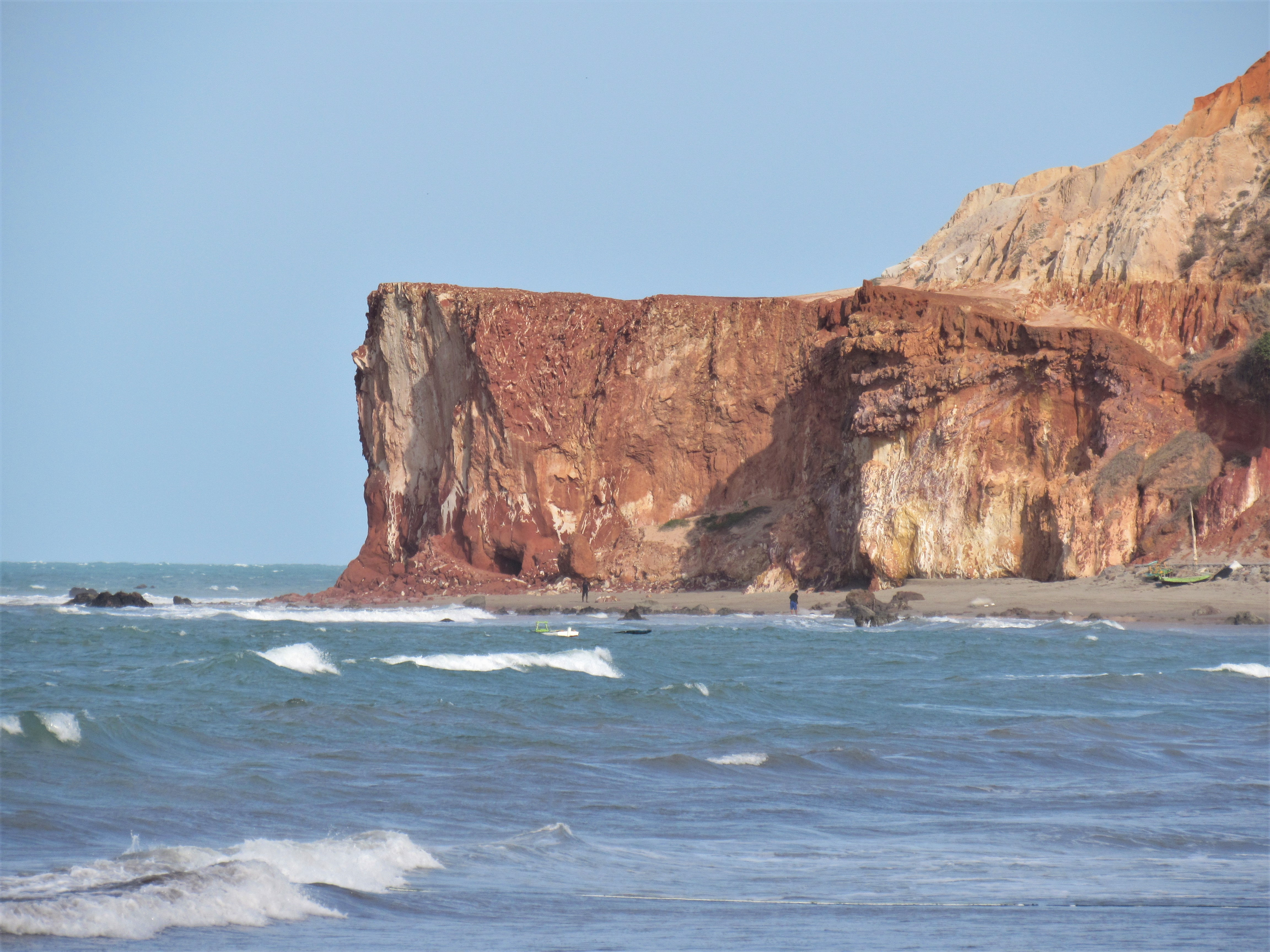
- Cliffs in Icapuí, Ceará
- Type: Geological formation
- Thickness: 212 metres (696 ft)

Lithology
- Primary: Sandstone, siltstone

Location
- Country: Brazil
- Extent: Rio de Janeiro – Amapá
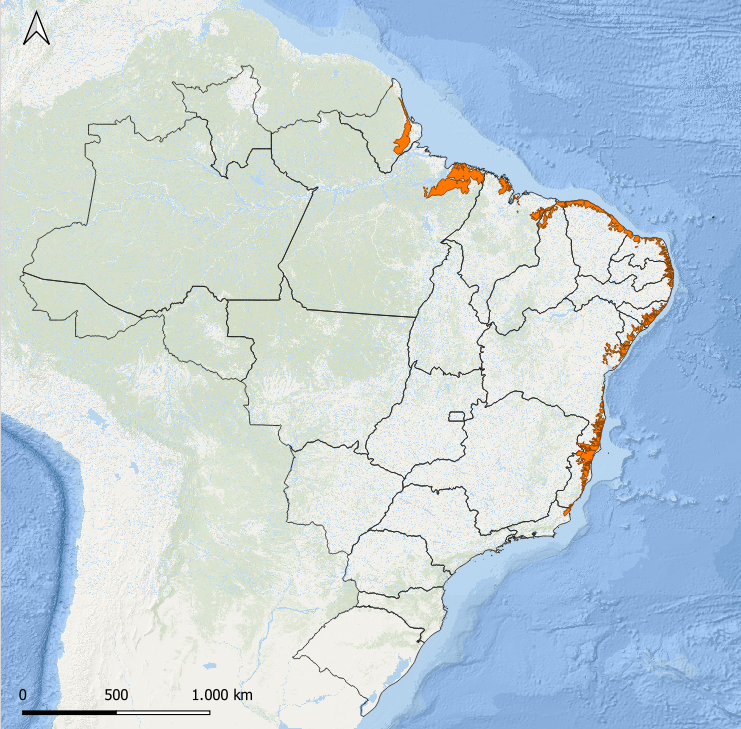
- Distribution of the Barreiras Formation (Brazilian Society of Geology, 2021)

The Barreiras Formation (Portuguese: Formação Barreiras) or the Barreiras Group (Grupo Barreiras) is a geological formation that gives rise to most of the cliffs along the Brazilian coast. It dates from the Cenozoic epoch and consists of sedimentary rock. It extends from the north of the state Rio de Janeiro to the south of Amapá.

== Geology ==
The name Barreiras translates as "barrier". In various places along the coast, the term refers to the obstacles posed by the cliffs for those wanting to travel between inland Brazil and the Atlantic Ocean. In the Letter of Pero Vaz de Caminha from 1500, he already wrote to King Manuel I of Portugal:

"[The land] presents along the sea in some parts large barriers (barreiras), some red and some white, and the land above is completely flat and full of large groves.”

The first time Barreiras was mentioned as part of geological research was in the work that J.C. Branner conducted in 1902 around the Paratibe River in the state Pernambuco. However, until the present day there is no academic consensus which of the terms Barreiras Formation or Barreiras Group is the correct one.

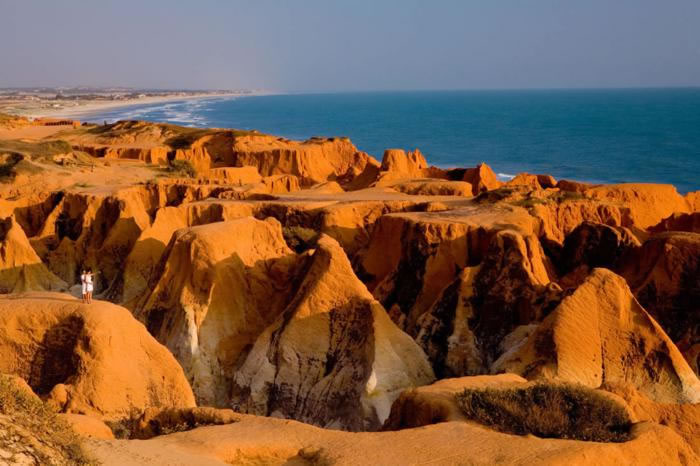
Beberibe Cliffs Natural Monument

The deposition of the Barreiras Formation was highly conditioned by tectonic processes that affect the South American platform since the Middle Miocene. These include episodes of epeirogenic uplift and continental flexure that deposited sediments in a long, narrow basin parallel to the coast. The large extension of the formation along the Brazilian coastline points to a connection to events on a continental scale, such as the opening of the South Atlantic Ocean and the formation of the Andes.

The Barreiras Formation is characterised by alternating lenticular layers of sandstone and siltstone of varying colours. Where the rock is laterised, ferruginous concretions can be observed.

== Use ==
Sand is extracted from the Barreiras Formation for use in civil construction. Pebbles and gravel are used in ball mills or for the confection of handicrafts.
