= Rafael Assis =

Rafael Assis may refer to:

- Rafael Assis (footballer, born 1990), Brazilian football midfielder
- Rafael Assis (footballer, born 1993), Brazilian football forward
