= Schumacher (footballer) =

Brazilian footballer

Personal information
- Full name: Thiago Maier dos Santos
- Date of birth: 31 August 1986 (age 40)
- Place of birth: Curitiba, Brazil
- Height: 1.92 m (6 ft 3 1/2 in)
- Position: Striker

Team information
- Current team: Operário Ferroviário U20 (head coach)

Youth career
- 2001–2004: Atlético Paranaense

Senior career*
Years	Team	Apps	(Gls)
2005	Atlético Paranaense	11	(3)
2006	→ Ascoli (loan)	0	(0)
2006–2007	Udinese	1	(0)
2006–2007	→ Ciudad de Murcia (loan)	4	(0)
2007–2008	Dijon	16	(3)
2008–2009	Austria Kärnten	18	(6)
2009–2011	Austria Wien	53	(7)
2011–2013	Volyn Lutsk	36	(4)
2014	Ferroviária	7	(0)
2014–2015	Académica	16	(1)
2015	Malucelli	3	(0)
2015–2016	Castiadas	6	(0)
2016	Linense	3	(0)
2017	Uberlândia	8	(1)
2017–2021	Operário Ferroviário	137	(19)
2022	Botafogo-PB	6	(0)
2023	Capão Raso	0	(0)
Total		325	(44)

Managerial career
- 2024: Operário Ferroviário U20 (assistant)
- 2025: Operário Ferroviário U17
- 2025–: Operário Ferroviário U20
- 2026: Operário Ferroviário (interim)
- * Club domestic league appearances and goals

Thiago Maier dos Santos (born 31 August 1986), known as Schumacher, is a Brazilian football coach and former player who played as a striker. He is the current head coach of Operário Ferroviário's under-20 team.

== Playing career ==
Born in Curitiba, Paraná, Schumacher began playing with hometown side Atlético Paranaense. On 31 August 2009, he was loaned to the Austrian side Austria Wien.

On 25 July 2014, Schumacher moved to Portuguese Académica. After playing for the Brazilian club Malucelli, he was signed to Italian club Castiadas from September 2015 to January 2016 and to Linense from January to April 2016.

== Honours ==
Operario Ferroviário

- Campeonato Brasileiro Série C: 2018
- Campeonato Brasileiro Série D: 2017
