= Jessui =

Brazilian footballer

Personal information
- Full name: Jessui Silva do Nascimento
- Date of birth: July 20, 1982 (age 44)
- Place of birth: Beberibe-CE, Brazil
- Height: 1.78 m (5 ft 10 in)
- Position: Striker

Senior career*
Years	Team	Apps	(Gls)
2001	Fortaleza		
2001	→ Goiânia (loan)		
2002	→ Ríver (loan)		
2004	Oeste		
2005	Maranguape		
2006	Ypiranga		
2006	Icasa		
2007	Serrano-PE		
2007	CSA		
2007–2009	União Leiria	4	(0)
2008	→ Pandurii Târgu Jiu (loan)	1	(0)
2009	Guarany		
2010	Araripina		
2010	Petrolina		
2010	Salgueiro	3	(0)
2011	Marília	4	(0)
2011	Serra Talhada	15	(2)
2013	Sousa	6	(1)
2013	Maracanã	7	(3)
2014	Tiradentes	2	(1)
2014	Chã Grande	13	(2)
2015	Serra Talhada	5	(1)
2016	Maranguape	11	(3)
2016	Parnahyba	6	(3)
2017	Tocantinópolis		
2018	Iguatu	3	(0)
2018	Tocantinópolis		
2019	Formosa	13	(8)
2019	Tiradentes	7	(2)
2020	Formosa	5	(0)
Total		105	(26)
- * Club domestic league appearances and goals

Jessui Silva do Nascimento (born July 20, 1982, in Beberibe) is a Brazilian former footballer who played as a striker. He had two experiences outside Brazil playing in Portugal for Primeira Liga club União Leiria and in Romania for Liga I club Pandurii Târgu Jiu.
