= Bruno Batata =

Brazilian footballer (born 1984)

Personal information
- Full name: Bruno Fressato Cardoso
- Date of birth: 26 September 1984 (age 42)
- Place of birth: Curitiba, Brazil
- Height: 1.80 m (5 ft 11 in)
- Position: Striker

Senior career*
Years	Team	Apps	(Gls)
2004	Coritiba		
2005	Paranavaí		
2005–2007	Cianorte		
2006	→ Londrina (loan)		
2007–2015	J. Malucelli	75	(25)
2008	→ Vila Nova (loan)	2	(2)
2009–2010	→ Coritiba (loan)	23	(4)
2010–2011	→ Brøndby (loan)	6	(1)
2012	→ Ipatinga (loan)	17	(2)
2013	→ Oeste (loan)	14	(2)
2014	→ Londrina (loan)	11	(4)
2014–2016	Londrina	44	(10)
2017	Joinville	15	(1)
2018	Maringá	20	(10)
2018–2020	Operário Ferroviário	34	(3)
- * Club domestic league appearances and goals as of 18 December 2019

Bruno Fressato Cardoso (born 26 September 1984), simply known as Bruno Batata, is a Brazilian former footballer who played as a striker.

== Career ==
Bruno has appeared mostly with Brazilian lower league teams throughout his career, but as Brøndby IF of the Danish Superliga was in need of a talented striker as cover up for injured Martin Bernburg, the club decided to loan him from Corinthians Paranaense in July 2010. Bruno scored his first goal in the Brøndby jersey in a match against OB on 22 August.

He played in Campeonato Brasileiro Série B with Vila Nova Futebol Clube during 2008.

Bruno would later play for different lower league sides in Brazil, most notably Operário where he played from 2018. There, he scored a decisive goal in the Brazilian 2018 Série C finals against Cuiabá which secured the championship for Operário. His contract was terminated on 23 April 2020, which actively made him a free agent.

Bruno Batata announced his retirement in August 2020.

== Honours ==
Coritiba

- Campeonato Paranaense: 2004

Londrina

- Campeonato Paranaense: 2014

Operário

- Campeonato Brasileiro Série C: 2018
