= Prainha do Canto Verde Extractive Reserve =

- Reserva Extrativista Prainha do Canto Verde
- IUCN category VI (protected area with sustainable use of natural resources)
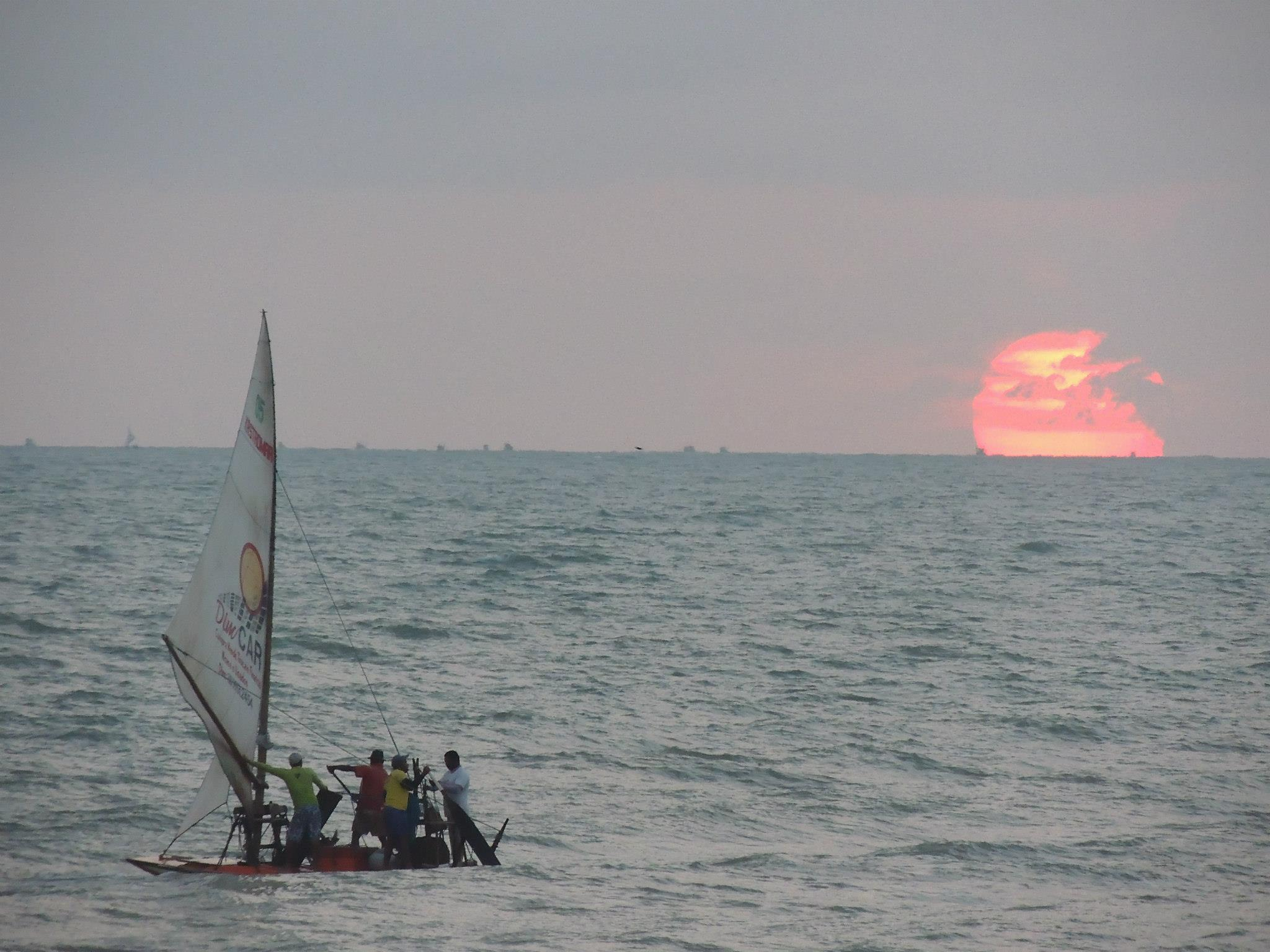
- Local fishermen

- Location within Brazil
- Nearest city: Beberibe, Ceará
- Coordinates: 4°18′26″S 37°55′57″W
- Area: 29,794 hectares (73,620 acres)
- Designation: Extractive reserve
- Created: 5 June 2009
- Administrator: ICMBio

The Prainha do Canto Verde Extractive Reserve (Portuguese: Reserva Extrativista Prainha do Canto Verde) is a marine extractive reserve in the state of Ceará, Brazil.

== Location ==
The Prainha do Canto Verde Extractive Reserve is in the municipality of Beberibe, Ceará. It has an area of 29,794 hectares (73,620 acres). The reserve occupies a narrow strip of the coastal plain and an area of sea extending to the northeast. It is located a few kilometres northwest of the tourist community of Canoa Quebrada.

The environment is characterised by coral reefs and coraline algae, and seems to still be in good condition. The coastal biome includes the typical coastal plain, a strip of beach, dunes and secondary forest, and natural and artificial reefs. The reserve is located beside the main estuaries of the region, which provide a constant supply of nutrients and organic matter, resulting in a significant source of biological resources for the local population, whose main occupation is fishing along the northeast coast from boats, rafts and catamarans. The main threats to the residents are the growth of hotels and real estate holdings.

== History ==
The area has been inhabited by fishermen since 1870. Starting in the late 1970s real estate speculators began to buy property from the local residents, anticipating the future potential for tourist resorts. The local residents began to organise in 1991 with support of the Friends of Prainha do Canto Verde Foundation. A nursery that the community started to build was destroyed by thugs, and residents who planned to build brick houses received threats. The struggle to create the reserve began in 2001, demanded by the Residents Association of Prainha do Canto Verde to protect the area where they live and fish. Various reports were prepared on the coastal ecosystem, lifestyle, culture and economy of the local people.

The Prainha do Canto Verde Marine Extractive Reserve was created by federal decree on 5 June 2009 with an area of about 29,794 hectares (73,620 acres). The reserve is classed as IUCN protected area category VI (protected area with sustainable use of natural resources). The objective is to protect the livelihoods and culture of the traditional extractive population of the Prainha do Canto Verde community, including those resident in the catchment area of the reserve and those living in contiguous areas, and to ensure the use and conservation of renewable natural resources. The reserve is administered by the Chico Mendes Institute for Biodiversity Conservation (ICMBio).

On 28 October 2009 the Instituto Nacional de Colonização e Reforma Agrária (INCRA – National Institute for Colonization and Agrarian Reform) recognised the reserve as meeting the needs of 360 small rural producer families, who would qualify for PRONAF support. The deliberative council was created on 14 December 2010. The "Independent Association of Residents of Prainha and Adjacencies" (AIMPA) attempted to have creation of the reserve annulled, but their action was rejected by a federal judge on 16 December 2014. A working group was established on 17 December 2014 to review the process of defining the profile of the beneficiary families. The profile was approved on 14 April 2015.

== Sources ==
- "Histórico da luta da comunidade na justiça e no campo", Prainha do Canto Verde (in Portuguese)
- João Lara Mesquita (17 July 2015), "Resex Prainha do Canto Verde", Mar Sem Fin
- "Justiça reconhece reserva extrativista da Prainha do Canto Verde em Beberiba", O Povo (in Portuguese), 22 December 2014
- Luiz Inácio Lula da Silva; Carlos Minc (9 June 2009), DECRETO DE 5 DE JUNHO DE 2009 (in Portuguese)
- Resex Prainha do Canto Verde (in Portuguese), ICMBio: Chico Mendes Institute for Biodiversity Conservation
- RESEX Marinha Prainha do Canto Verde (in Portuguese), ISA: Instituto Socioambiental
- Unidade de Conservação: Reserva Extrativista Prainha do Canto Verde (in Portuguese), MMA: Ministério do Meio Ambiente
