= Dione (footballer, born 1993) =

Brazilian footballer

Personal information
- Full name: Dione Miguel Ribas
- Date of birth: 16 July 1993 (age 33)
- Place of birth: São Paulo, Brazil
- Height: 1.70 m (5 ft 7 in)
- Position: Midfielder

Team information
- Current team: Itabaiana

Youth career
- 2005–2011: RB Esportes (Campo Mourão)
- 2012: Laranja Mecânica-PR
- 2013: SOBE Iguaçu

Senior career*
Years	Team	Apps	(Gls)
2015	Mundo Novo		
2016–2019	Operário Ferroviário	54	(9)
2019	→ ABC (loan)	9	(0)
2020	América de Natal	30	(8)
2020–2021	Sampaio Corrêa	25	(3)
2021	Floresta	8	(0)
2021–2022	Campinense	45	(13)
2022	→ Novo Hamburgo (loan)	3	(1)
2023	Confiança	28	(5)
2024	Zakho		
2024	Volta Redonda	4	(0)
2025	Treze	15	(5)
2025–	Itabaiana	7	(1)
- * Club domestic league appearances and goals as of 26 February 2025

Dione Miguel Ribas (born 16 July 1993), simply known as Dione, is a Brazilian professional footballer who plays as a midfielder for Itabaiana.

== Career ==
Born in São Paulo, Dione began his career as a player playing for amateur teams in the state of Paraná. In 2015, he played for his first professional club, Mundo Novo-MS. In 2017, he arrived at Operário Ferroviário where he won the national titles in Series C and D. He later played for some teams in the northeast, winning state championships with Sampaio Corrêa in 2021 and Campinense in 2022. In 2023 he played for AD Confiança, and later for Zakho SC from Iraq. In July 2024, he was signed by Volta Redonda FC.

For the 2025 season Dione signed with Treze FC. On July, he was announced as a reinforcement of AO Itabaiana.

== Honours ==
Operário Ferroviário

- Campeonato Brasileiro Série C: 2018
- Campeonato Brasileiro Série D: 2017
- Campeonato Paranaense Série Prata: 2018

Sampaio Corrêa

- Campeonato Maranhense: 2021

Campinense

- Campeonato Paraibano: 2022

Volta Redonda

- Campeonato Brasileiro Série C: 2024

Itabaiana

- Copa Governo do Estado de Sergipe: 2025
