= Christiano (footballer) =

Brazilian footballer (born 2000)

Personal information
- Full name: Christiano Victor das Neves Silva Felix
- Date of birth: 3 May 2000 (age 26)
- Height: 1.82 m (6 ft 0 in)
- Position: Midfielder

Team information
- Current team: Náutico

Youth career
- –2020: Náutico
- 2019–2020: → Retrô (youth loan)

Senior career*
Years	Team	Apps	(Gls)
2018–	Náutico	1	(0)
- * Club domestic league appearances and goals as of 16:14, 6 August 2020 (UTC)

Christiano Victor das Neves Silva Felix (born 3 May 2000), commonly known as Christiano, is a Brazilian footballer who currently plays as a midfielder for Náutico.

== Career statistics ==
=== Club ===
As of 6 August 2020.

Club	Season	League			State League		Cup		Other		Total	
Club	Season	Division	Apps	Goals	Apps	Goals	Apps	Goals	Apps	Goals	Apps	Goals
Náutico	2018	Série C	0	0	1 (Note: Appearances in the Campeonato Pernambucano)	0	0	0	0	0	1	0
Náutico	2019	Série C	0	0	0	0	0	0	0	0	0	0
Náutico	2020	Série B	0	0	0	0	0	0	0	0	0	0
Career total			0	0	1	0	0	0	0	0	1	0
