= 2017 Campeonato Brasileiro Série D =

Campeonato Brasileiro Série D
- Season: 2017
- Champions: Operário Ferroviário (1st title)
- Promoted: Atlético Acreano; Globo; Juazeirense; Operário Ferroviário
- Matches: 266
- Goals: 631 (2.37 per match)
- Top goalscorer: 9 goals Eduardo, Atlético Acreano; Weverton, Princesa do Solimões
- Biggest home win: 5–0; Atlético Acreano v Real Ariquemes; Group A1, R3, 4 June; Luziânia v Sete de Setembro; Group A11, R3, 3 June
- Biggest away win: 0–5; Globo v Operário Ferroviário; Final, 1st leg, 3 September
- Highest scoring: 7 goals Atlético Pernambucano 4–3 Campinense; Group A8, R1, 21 May; Rio Branco 4–3 São Raimundo (RR); Group A3, R1, 21 May; Santos 5–2 Tocantins de Miracema; Group A4, R2, 28 May; São Paulo 3–4 XV de Piracicaba; Group A15, R6, 25 June
- Highest attendance: 12,799; América de Natal 1–1 Juazeirense; Quarterfinals, 2nd leg, 13 August
- Lowest attendance: 16; Real Ariquemes 0–1 Princesa do Solimões; Group A1, R6, 25 Jun
- Total attendance: 294,818
- Average attendance: 1,152

The 2017 Campeonato Brasileiro Série D, the fourth level of the Brazilian League, was contested by 68 clubs. The competition started on 21 May and ended on 10 September 2017.

Atlético Acreano, Globo, Juazeirense and Operário Ferroviário qualified for the semi-finals and were promoted to the 2018 Campeonato Brasileiro Série C.

Operário Ferroviário won the title after defeating Globo in the final.

== Competition format ==
In the first stage, 68 teams were divided into seventeen groups of four, organized regionally. The teams played home and away against the other three teams in their group, a total of six games. The winner of each group plus the best 15 runners-up qualified for the second stage. From the second stage on the competition was played as a knock-out tournament with each round contested over two legs. The four semi-finalists qualified for the 2018 Campeonato Brasileiro Série C.

=== First stage ===
Key to colours in group tables
Group winners advance to the Second stage
Best group runners-up advance to the Second stage

Group A1 (AC-AP-AM-RO)

Pos	Team	Pld	W	D	L	GF	GA	GD	Pts
1	(Acre (state)) Atlético Acreano	6	4	1	1	16	6	+10	13
2	(Amazonas (Brazilian state)) Princesa do Solimões	6	4	0	2	9	4	+5	12
3	(Amapá) Trem	6	3	0	3	7	11	−4	9
4	(Rondônia) Real Ariquemes	6	0	1	5	3	14	−11	1

Group A2 (AM-PA-RR-TO)

Pos	Team	Pld	W	D	L	GF	GA	GD	Pts
1	(Tocantins) Gurupi	6	3	2	1	9	6	+3	11
2	(Pará) São Raimundo	6	3	1	2	11	7	+4	7 (Note: São Raimundo deducted three points for fielding an unregistered player.)
3	(Amazonas (Brazilian state)) Fast Clube	6	1	4	1	6	7	−1	7
4	(Roraima) Baré	6	0	3	3	3	9	−6	3

Notes:

Group A3 (AC-PA-RO-RR)

Pos	Team	Pld	W	D	L	GF	GA	GD	Pts
1	(Acre (state)) Rio Branco	6	4	1	1	10	6	+4	13
2	(Pará) São Francisco	6	2	3	1	7	6	+1	9
3	(Roraima) São Raimundo (RR)	6	1	2	3	7	9	−2	5
4	(Rondônia) Genus	6	1	2	3	7	10	−3	5

Group A4 (AP-MA-PI-TO)

Pos	Team	Pld	W	D	L	GF	GA	GD	Pts
1	(Amapá) Santos	6	4	1	1	11	6	+5	13
2	(Piauí) Altos	6	3	1	2	14	6	+8	10
3	(Maranhão) Cordino	6	2	1	3	5	9	−4	7
4	Tocantins de Miracema	6	1	1	4	5	14	−9	4

Group A5 (CE-MA-PI-RN)

Pos	Team	Pld	W	D	L	GF	GA	GD	Pts
1	(Ceará) Guarany de Sobral	6	4	1	1	10	7	+3	13
2	Maranhão	6	3	1	2	9	4	+5	10
3	(Piauí) River	6	3	0	3	8	9	−1	9
4	(Rio Grande do Norte) Potiguar	6	0	2	4	4	11	−7	2

Group A6 (CE-PE-PI-RN)

Pos	Team	Pld	W	D	L	GF	GA	GD	Pts
1	(Rio Grande do Norte) Globo	6	4	0	2	7	3	+4	12
2	(Piauí) Parnahyba	6	3	0	3	6	4	+2	9
3	(Pernambuco) América (PE)	6	2	1	3	3	5	−2	7
4	(Ceará) Guarani	6	2	1	3	3	7	−4	7

Group A7 (AL-BA-PB-PE)

Pos	Team	Pld	W	D	L	GF	GA	GD	Pts
1	(Bahia) Juazeirense	6	2	3	1	9	6	+3	9
2	(Paraíba) Sousa	6	2	3	1	6	4	+2	9
3	(Alagoas) Coruripe	6	2	1	3	9	10	−1	7
4	(Pernambuco) Central	6	2	1	3	7	11	−4	7

Group A8 (BA-PB-PE-SE)

Pos	Team	Pld	W	D	L	GF	GA	GD	Pts
1	(Bahia) Fluminense de Feira	6	2	3	1	9	5	+4	9
2	(Paraíba) Campinense	6	2	2	2	6	5	+1	8
3	(Pernambuco) Atlético Pernambucano	6	2	1	3	9	12	−3	7
4	(Sergipe) Itabaiana	6	2	2	2	8	10	−2	5 (Note: Itabaiana deducted three points for fielding an unregistered player.)

Notes:

Group A9 (AL-BA-RN-SE)

Pos	Team	Pld	W	D	L	GF	GA	GD	Pts
1	(Rio Grande do Norte) América de Natal	6	5	0	1	13	4	+9	15
2	(Bahia) Jacobina	6	3	0	3	9	9	0	9
3	Sergipe	6	2	0	4	7	11	−4	6
4	(Alagoas) Murici	6	2	0	4	7	12	−5	6

Group A10 (DF-GO-MT-MS)

Pos	Team	Pld	W	D	L	GF	GA	GD	Pts
1	(Federal District (Brazil)) Ceilândia	6	3	1	2	8	5	+3	10
2	(Mato Grosso do Sul) Comercial	6	3	1	2	10	9	+1	10
3	(Goiás) Anápolis	6	2	3	1	8	6	+2	9
4	(Mato Grosso) Sinop	6	0	3	3	5	11	−6	3

Group A11 (DF-GO-MT-MS)

Pos	Team	Pld	W	D	L	GF	GA	GD	Pts
1	(Mato Grosso) União Rondonópolis	6	3	2	1	8	6	+2	11
2	(Goiás) Aparecidense	6	3	1	2	10	8	+2	10
3	(Federal District (Brazil)) Luziânia	6	2	4	0	11	5	+6	10
4	(Mato Grosso do Sul) Sete de Setembro	6	0	1	5	3	13	−10	1

Group A12 (GO-MG-RJ-SP)

Pos	Team	Pld	W	D	L	GF	GA	GD	Pts
1	(Rio de Janeiro (state)) Portuguesa (RJ)	6	4	2	0	9	2	+7	14
2	(Minas Gerais) URT	6	3	1	2	4	5	−1	10
3	(Goiás) Itumbiara	6	2	2	2	5	6	−1	8
4	(São Paulo (state)) Osasco Audax	6	0	1	5	4	9	−5	1

Group A13 (ES-MG-RJ-SP)

Pos	Team	Pld	W	D	L	GF	GA	GD	Pts
1	(Minas Gerais) Villa Nova	6	2	3	1	6	6	0	9
2	(Espírito Santo) Desportiva Ferroviária	6	2	2	2	5	5	0	8
3	(Rio de Janeiro (state)) Bangu	6	2	2	2	7	8	−1	8
4	(São Paulo (state)) Portuguesa (SP)	6	2	1	3	5	4	+1	7

Source: Soccerway

Group A14 (ES-MG-RJ-SP)

Pos	Team	Pld	W	D	L	GF	GA	GD	Pts
1	(Rio de Janeiro (state)) Boavista	6	3	2	1	10	7	+3	11
2	Espírito Santo	6	2	3	1	6	4	+2	9
3	(São Paulo (state)) Red Bull Brasil	6	2	1	3	5	5	0	7
4	(Minas Gerais) Caldense	6	2	0	4	6	11	−5	6

Group A15 (PR-RS-SC-SP)

Pos	Team	Pld	W	D	L	GF	GA	GD	Pts
1	(Paraná (state)) Operário Ferroviário	6	4	0	2	6	3	+3	12
2	(Santa Catarina (state)) Brusque	6	3	1	2	8	5	+3	10
3	(São Paulo (state)) XV de Piracicaba	6	3	0	3	7	8	−1	9
4	(Rio Grande do Sul) São Paulo	6	1	1	4	7	12	−5	4

Group A16 (PR-RS-SC-SP)

Pos	Team	Pld	W	D	L	GF	GA	GD	Pts
1	(São Paulo (state)) São Bernardo	6	4	1	1	7	3	+4	13
2	(Santa Catarina (state)) Inter de Lages	6	2	2	2	4	4	0	8
3	(Paraná (state)) Foz do Iguaçu	6	1	3	2	4	6	−2	6
4	(Rio Grande do Sul) Novo Hamburgo	6	1	2	3	4	6	−2	5

Group A17 (PR-RS-SC-SP)

Pos	Team	Pld	W	D	L	GF	GA	GD	Pts
1	(Rio Grande do Sul) São José (RS)	6	4	0	2	13	4	+9	12
2	(Santa Catarina (state)) Metropolitano	6	3	1	2	3	5	−2	10
3	(São Paulo (state)) Ituano	6	2	2	2	4	4	0	8
4	(Paraná (state)) PSTC	6	1	1	4	3	10	−7	4

== Second stage ==
The Second stage was a two-legged knockout tie, with the draw regionalised.

=== Qualification and draw ===
The 32 qualifiers (17 group winners and 15 best performing group runners-up) were divided into two pots. Pot 1 contained the 16 best performing group winners. Pot 2 contained the worst performing group winner and the 15 qualifying group runners-up. In pot 1 the teams were numbered 1 to 16 in numerical order of the group they qualified from. In pot 2 the teams were numbered 17 to 32 in numerical order of the group they qualified from. In the case that one of the qualifying runners-up was from the same group as the worst performing group winner, both teams would be in pot 2 and the group winner would be numbered lower in sequence than the group runner-up.

To keep the draw regionalised Team 1 played Team 18, Team 2 played Team 17 and this pattern was repeated throughout the draw. The higher numbered team played at home in the first leg.

==== Ranking of group winners ====
Ranking of group winners to determine the worst performing team to be placed into pot 2 is achieved by comparing 1) Points gained 2) Most victories 3) Best goal difference 4) Most goals scored 5) Sort.

Rank	Team	Pts	W	GD	GF	Pot
1	(Rio Grande do Norte) América de Natal	15	5	9	13	Pot 1
2	(Rio de Janeiro (state)) Portuguesa (RJ)	14	4	7	9	Pot 1
3	(Acre (state)) Atlético Acreano	13	4	10	16	Pot 1
4	(Amapá) Santos	13	4	5	11	Pot 1
5	(Acre (state)) Rio Branco	13	4	4	10	Pot 1
6	(São Paulo (state)) São Bernardo	13	4	4	7	Pot 1
7	(Ceará) Guarany de Sobral	13	4	3	10	Pot 1
8	(Rio Grande do Sul) São José (RS)	12	4	9	13	Pot 1
9	(Rio Grande do Norte) Globo	12	4	4	7	Pot 1
10	(Paraná (state)) Operário Ferroviário	12	4	3	6	Pot 1
11	(Rio de Janeiro (state)) Boavista	11	3	3	10	Pot 1
12	(Tocantins) Gurupi	11	3	3	9	Pot 1
13	(Mato Grosso) União Rondonópolis	11	3	2	8	Pot 1
14	(Federal District (Brazil)) Ceilândia	10	3	3	8	Pot 1
15	(Bahia) Fluminense de Feira	9	2	4	9	Pot 1
16	(Bahia) Juazeirense	9	2	3	9	Pot 1
17	(Minas Gerais) Villa Nova	9	2	0	6	Pot 2

==== Ranking of group runners-up ====
Ranking of group runners-up to determine the 15 best performing teams to be placed into pot 2 is achieved by comparing 1) Points gained 2) Most victories 3) Best goal difference 4) Most goals scored 5) Sort.

Rank	Team	Pts	W	GD	GF	Pot
1	(Amazonas (Brazilian state)) Princesa do Solimões	12	4	5	9	Pot 2
2	(Piauí) Altos	10	3	8	14	Pot 2
3	Maranhão	10	3	5	9	Pot 2
4	(Santa Catarina (state)) Brusque	10	3	3	8	Pot 2
5	(Goiás) Aparecidense	10	3	2	10	Pot 2
6	(Mato Grosso do Sul) Comercial	10	3	1	10	Pot 2
7	(Minas Gerais) URT	10	3	-1	4	Pot 2
8	(Santa Catarina (state)) Metropolitano	10	3	-2	3	Pot 2
9	(Piauí) Parnahyba	9	3	2	6	Pot 2
10	(Bahia) Jacobina	9	3	0	9	Pot 2
11	Espírito Santo	9	2	2	6	Pot 2
12	(Paraíba) Sousa	9	2	2	6	Pot 2
13	(Pará) São Francisco	9	2	1	7	Pot 2
14	(Paraíba) Campinense	8	2	1	6	Pot 2
15	(Espírito Santo) Desportiva Ferroviária	8	2	0	5	Pot 2
16	(Santa Catarina (state)) Inter de Lages	8	2	0	4	Eliminated
17	(Pará) São Raimundo	7	3	4	11	Eliminated

==== Qualification pots ====
Pot 1
#	Group	Team
1	A1	(Acre (state)) Atlético Acreano
2	A2	(Tocantins) Gurupi
3	A3	(Acre (state)) Rio Branco
4	A4	(Amapá) Santos
5	A5	(Ceará) Guarany de Sobral
6	A6	(Rio Grande do Norte) Globo
7	A7	(Bahia) Juazeirense
8	A8	(Bahia) Fluminense de Feira
9	A9	(Rio Grande do Norte) América de Natal
10	A10	(Federal District (Brazil)) Ceilândia
11	A11	(Mato Grosso) União Rondonópolis
12	A12	(Rio de Janeiro (state)) Portuguesa (RJ)
13	A14	(Rio de Janeiro (state)) Boavista
14	A15	(Paraná (state)) Operário Ferroviário
15	A16	(São Paulo (state)) São Bernardo
16	A17	(Rio Grande do Sul) São José (RS)

Pot 2
#	Group	Team
17	A1	(Amazonas (Brazilian state)) Princesa do Solimões
18	A3	(Pará) São Francisco
19	A4	(Piauí) Altos
20	A5	Maranhão
21	A6	(Piauí) Parnahyba
22	A7	(Paraíba) Sousa
23	A8	(Paraíba) Campinense
24	A9	(Bahia) Jacobina
25	A10	(Mato Grosso do Sul) Comercial
26	A11	(Goiás) Aparecidense
27	A12	(Minas Gerais) URT
28	A13	(Minas Gerais) Villa Nova
29	A13	(Espírito Santo) Desportiva Ferroviária
30	A14	Espírito Santo
31	A15	(Santa Catarina (state)) Brusque
32	A17	(Santa Catarina (state)) Metropolitano

==== Ties ====
The second stage matches were originally scheduled between 1 and 9 July, but they were rescheduled due to the investigation involving São Raimundo. The matches were postponed by the CBF for a week. Finally, the matches were played between 8 and 16 July.

Team 1	Agg.	Team 2	1st leg	2nd leg	Tie number
São Francisco (Pará)	3–6	(Acre (state)) Atlético Acreano	3–3	0–3	B1
Princesa do Solimões (Amazonas (Brazilian state))	4–4 (a)	(Tocantins) Gurupi	3–3	1–1	B2
Maranhão	3–1	(Acre (state)) Rio Branco	2–0	1–1	B3
Altos (Piauí)	3–3 (a)	(Amapá) Santos	2–2	1–1	B4
Sousa (Paraíba)	4–4 (3–4 p)	(Ceará) Guarany de Sobral	3–1	1–3	B5
Parnahyba (Piauí)	2–5	(Rio Grande do Norte) Globo	2–3	0–2	B6
Jacobina (Bahia)	3–5	(Bahia) Juazeirense	2–2	1–3	B7
Campinense (Paraíba)	1–1 (a)	(Bahia) Fluminense de Feira	1–1	0–0	B8
Aparecidense (Goiás)	0–1	(Rio Grande do Norte) América de Natal	0–0	0–1	B9
Comercial (Mato Grosso do Sul)	1–2	(Federal District (Brazil)) Ceilândia	0–1	1–1	B10
Villa Nova (Minas Gerais)	4–1	(Mato Grosso) União Rondonópolis	2–0	2–1	B11
URT (Minas Gerais)	2–1	(Rio de Janeiro (state)) Portuguesa (RJ)	1–0	1–1	B12
Espírito Santo	4–1	(Rio de Janeiro (state)) Boavista	1–0	3–1	B13
Desportiva Ferroviária (Espírito Santo)	1–4	(Paraná (state)) Operário Ferroviário	0–2	1–2	B14
Metropolitano (Santa Catarina (state))	3–4	(São Paulo (state)) São Bernardo	1–1	2–3	B15
Brusque (Santa Catarina (state))	2–2 (a)	(Rio Grande do Sul) São José (RS)	2–1	0–1	B16

== Third stage ==
The third stage was also a two-legged knockout tie, with the draw regionalised. The ties were predetermined from the second stage, with the winner of second stage tie 1 playing the winner of second stage tie 2, etc. The matches were played between 22 and 30 July.

=== Ties ===
Team 1	Agg.	Team 2	1st leg	2nd leg	Tie number
Gurupi (Tocantins)	1–3	(Acre (state)) Atlético Acreano	1–0	0–3	C1
Maranhão	4–4 (4–3 p)	(Amapá) Santos	2–2	2–2	C2
Guarany de Sobral (Ceará)	1–4	(Rio Grande do Norte) Globo	0–1	1–3	C3
Fluminense de Feira (Bahia)	3–3 (a)	(Bahia) Juazeirense	3–3	0–0	C4
Ceilândia (Federal District (Brazil))	1–3	(Rio Grande do Norte) América de Natal	0–1	1–2	C5
URT (Minas Gerais)	1–1 (a)	(Minas Gerais) Villa Nova	0–0	1–1	C6
Espírito Santo	1–1 (2–4 p)	(Paraná (state)) Operário Ferroviário	1–0	0–1	C7
São José (RS) (Rio Grande do Sul)	0–0 (4–3 p)	(São Paulo (state)) São Bernardo	0–0	0–0	C8

== Final stage ==
The final stage was a two leg knockout competition with quarter-finals, semi-finals and finals rounds. The draw for the quarter-finals was seeded based on the table of results of all matches in the competition for the qualifying teams. First played eighth, second played seventh, etc. The top four seeded teams played the second leg at home. The four quarter-final winners were promoted to Série C for 2018.

The draw for the semi-finals was seeded based on the table of results of all matches in the competition for the qualifying teams. First played fourth, second played third. The top two seeded teams played the second leg at home.

In the finals, the team with the best record in the competition played the second leg at home.

=== Quarter-finals seedings ===
Seed	Team	Pts	W	GD	GF
1	(Rio Grande do Norte) América de Natal	25	8	12	17
2	(Rio Grande do Norte) Globo	24	8	10	16
3	(Paraná (state)) Operário Ferroviário	21	7	6	11
4	(Acre (state)) Atlético Acreano	20	6	15	25
5	(Rio Grande do Sul) São José (RS)	17	5	9	15
6	Maranhão	16	4	7	16
7	(Minas Gerais) URT	16	4	0	7
8	(Bahia) Juazeirense	15	3	5	17

=== Quarter-finals ties ===
The matches were played between 5 and 14 August.

Team 1	Agg.	Team 2	1st leg	2nd leg
Juazeirense (Bahia)	4–1	(Rio Grande do Norte) América de Natal	3–0	1–1
URT (Minas Gerais)	1–1 (2–3 p)	(Rio Grande do Norte) Globo	1–0	0–1
Maranhão	2–5	(Paraná (state)) Operário Ferroviário	1–3	1–2
São José (RS) (Rio Grande do Sul)	1–2	(Acre (state)) Atlético Acreano	0–1	1–1

=== Semi-finals seedings ===
Seed	Team	Pts	W	GD	GF
1	(Rio Grande do Norte) Globo	27	9	10	17
2	(Paraná (state)) Operário Ferroviário	27	9	9	16
3	(Acre (state)) Atlético Acreano	24	7	16	27
4	(Bahia) Juazeirense	19	4	8	21

=== Semi-finals ties ===
The matches were played between 19 and 28 August.

Team 1	Agg.	Team 2	1st leg	2nd leg
Juazeirense (Bahia)	3–3 (a)	(Rio Grande do Norte) Globo	3–1	0–2
Atlético Acreano (Acre (state))	0–2	(Paraná (state)) Operário Ferroviário	0–0	0–2

=== Final ===
The matches were played on 3 and 10 September.

Team 1	Agg.	Team 2	1st leg	2nd leg
Globo (Rio Grande do Norte)	1–5	(Paraná (state)) Operário Ferroviário	0–5	1–0

September 3, 2017
17:00 UTC−3

Globo (Rio Grande do Norte)	0–5	(Paraná (state)) Operário Ferroviário
	Report	Tiago Lima 22' (o.g.); Lucas Batatinha 27' (pen.); Quirino 53'; Jean Carlo 64'; Dione 83'

Barrettão, Ceará-Mirim
Attendance: 2,181
Referee: Marcelo de Lima Henrique (Rio de Janeiro)

September 10, 2017
19:00 UTC−3

Operário Ferroviário (Paraná (state))	0–1	(Rio Grande do Norte) Globo
	Report	Tiago Lima 24'

Germano Krüger, Ponta Grossa
Attendance: 8,679
Referee: Rodrigo D'Alonso Ferreira (Santa Catarina)
