= Paulo Renê =

Brazilian footballer

Paulo Renê Gomes dos Santos (born 24 January 1989), simply known as Paulo Renê, is a Brazilian footballer who plays for Luverdense as a forward.

== Personal life ==
Son of Maria de Lourdes Gomes and Sérgio Antônio dos Santos, he has only a brother, Sergio, who is seven years older. He grew up in an interior city about 40 km from the Federal District. He has been married since 2014 to a Brazilian model, with whom he has two children.

== Career statistics ==
As of 13 July 2018

| Club | Season | League | | | State League | | Cup | | Continental | | Other | | Total | |
| Club | Season | Division | Apps | Goals | Apps | Goals | Apps | Goals | Apps | Goals | Apps | Goals | Apps | Goals |
|---|---|---|---|---|---|---|---|---|---|---|---|---|---|---|
| Santa Cruz | 2011 | Série D | 0 | 0 | — | | — | | — | | — | | 0 | 0 |
| Gama | 2012 | Brasiliense | — | | — | | 1 | 0 | — | | — | | 1 | 0 |
| Bragantino | 2012 | Série B | 3 | 1 | — | | — | | — | | — | | 3 | 1 |
| Paraná | 2013 | Série B | — | | 7 | 0 | — | | — | | — | | 7 | 0 |
| Itumbiara | 2015 | Goiano | — | | 3 | 1 | — | | — | | — | | 3 | 1 |
| CRAC | 2015 | Série D | 1 | 0 | — | | — | | — | | — | | 1 | 0 |
| Madureira | 2016 | Série D | — | | 5 | 0 | — | | — | | — | | 5 | 0 |
| Goianésia | 2017 | Goiano | — | | 4 | 0 | — | | — | | — | | 4 | 0 |
| Luverdense | 2018 | Série C | 10 | 4 | — | | 2 | 1 | — | | — | | 12 | 5 |
| Career total | | | 14 | 5 | 19 | 1 | 3 | 1 | 0 | 0 | 0 | 0 | 36 | 7 |
