= Dudu Beberibe =

Brazilian footballer

Personal information
- Full name: Eraldo dos Santos Trindade
- Date of birth: 10 October 1992 (age 34)
- Place of birth: Beberibe, Brazil
- Height: 1.83 m (6 ft 0 in)
- Position: Forward

Senior career*
| Years | Team | Apps | (Gls) |
| 2014 | América-CE | | |
| 2015 | Tiradentes-CE | | |
| 2015–2020 | Horizonte | | |
| 2017 | → Pacajus (loan) | | |
| 2018 | → Altos (loan) | | |
| 2018 | → Ferroviário (loan) | | |
| 2019 | → Unirb (loan) | | |
| 2020 | → Moto Club (loan) | | |
| 2020 | → 4 de Julho (loan) | | |
| 2021 | 4 de Julho | | |
| 2021 | CSA | 5 | (0) |
| 2022 | Barra-SC | | |
| 2022 | Horizonte | | |
| 2023 | Mixto | 4 | (0) |
| 2023 | Tuntum | | |
- * Club domestic league appearances and goals as of 17 October 2023

Eraldo dos Santos Trindade (born 10 October 1992), better known as Dudu Beberibe, is a Brazilian professional footballer who plays as a forward.

== Career ==
Dudu started his career at América-CE, in the third division of Ceará. He played for Tiradentes and spent several years at Horizonte FC, being loaned to other clubs. He was champion of Piauí with Altos and 2018 Série D with Ferroviário.

He was champion again on the 4 de Julho EC, being acquired definitively for the 2021 season. After standing out in the Copa do Brasil on the 4 de Julho, he was announced by the CSA to compete in 2021 Campeonato Brasileiro Série B. Making a total of 5 appearances, the player ended up being released in September.

Dudu competed in the 2023 Campeonato Mato Grossense for Mixto but was released before the end of the competition. He was signed by Tuntum for the remainder of the season.

== Personal life ==
After facing São Paulo FC in the 2021 Copa do Brasil, where he scored a goal after 29 seconds, the player declared himself a fan of the club, having cried in celebration.

== Honours ==
Altos

- Campeonato Piauiense: 2018

Ferroviário

- Campeonato Brasileiro Série D: 2018
- Copa Fares Lopes: 2018

4 de Julho

- Campeonato Piauiense: 2020

Tuntum

- Campeonato Maranhense Second Division: 2023
