= Beberibe Cliffs Natural Monument =

National monument in Ceará, Brazil

- Monumento Natural das Falésias de Beberibe
- IUCN category III (natural monument or feature)
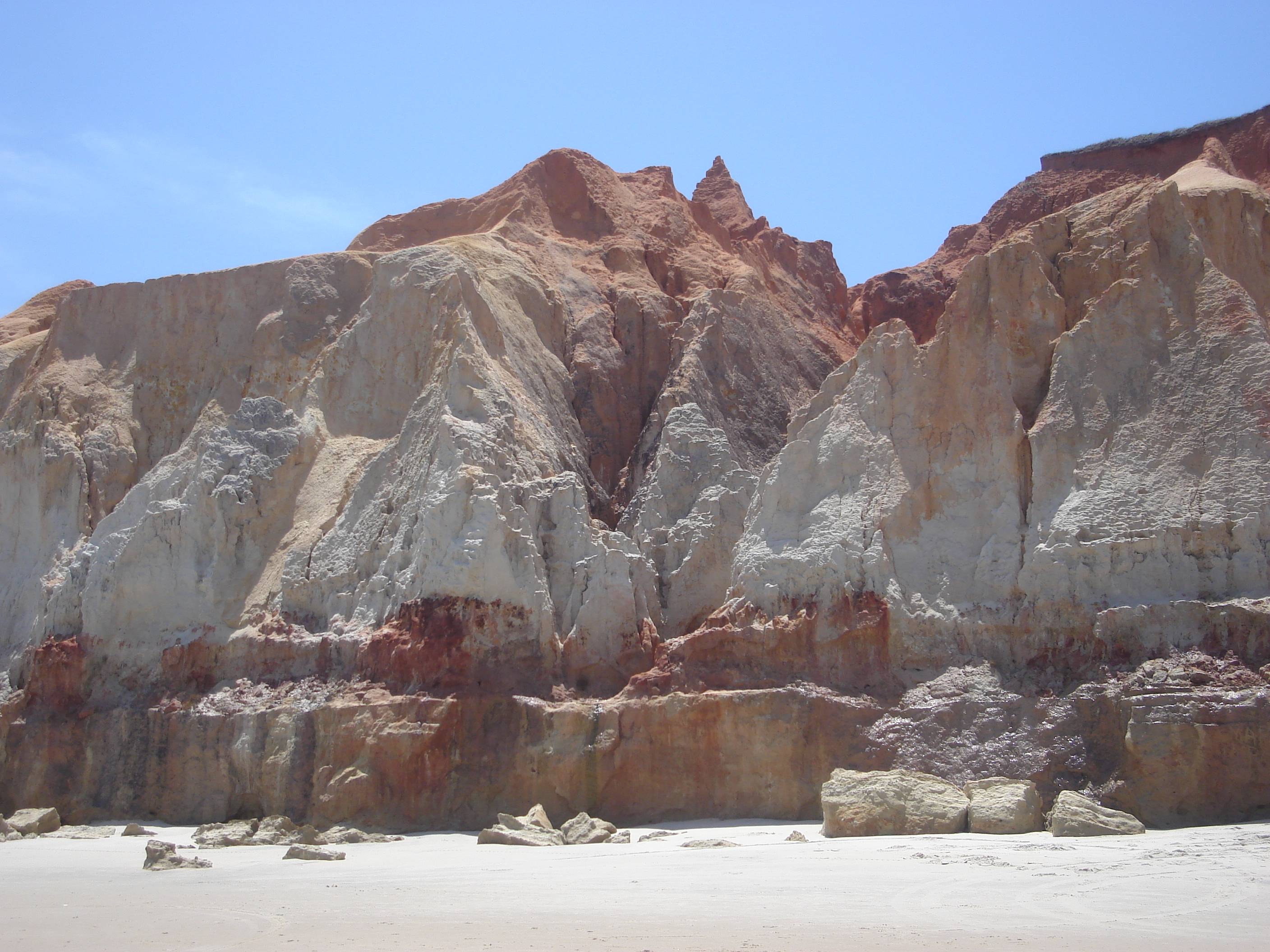
- Beberibe Cliffs

- Location within Brazil
- Nearest city: Beberibe, Ceará
- Coordinates: 4°09′28″S 38°06′29″W
- Area: 31.2 hectares (77 acres)
- Designation: Natural monument
- Created: 3 June 2004

Beberibe Cliffs Natural Monument (Portuguese: Monumento Natural das Falésias de Beberibe is a natural monument in the state of Ceará, Brazil.

== Foundation ==
The Beberibe Cliffs Natural Monument was instituted on 3 June 2004 by Ceará governor Lúcio Alcântara. At the same ceremony he signed the decree creating the Mata Fresca Private Ecological Reserve. The natural monument, of major environmental and tourist interest, is visited by about 400 people per day. The decree turned it into a fully protected area so that only eco-tourism and research would be allowed, and that only with permission from the responsible agency. Local youth were to be employed as guides, and explanatory signs installed.

== Location ==
The natural monument is in the municipality of Beberibe on the east coast of the state of Ceará, between the Morro Branco and Fontes beaches. It has an area of 31.2 hectares (77 acres) and a perimeter of 5,709 metres (18,730 ft). The objective of the reserve is to protect the cliffs against the environmental impacts that had occurred earlier. Other cliffs in the region are unprotected and are occupied by hotels and vacation houses.

== Cliffs ==
The cliffs in the area run along the coast for about 6 kilometres (3.7 mi) where the Barreiras tableland reaches the coast. They are formed of sand-clay sediments from the Tertiary or Quaternary ages, with fine to medium grains, and with colors ranging from white to yellow to red. They are evolving as the sea acts on their bases and wind and rain erodes their upper parts. They are cut by gullies formed by the main streams that flow down to the sea. One famous structure is the Gruta da Mãe D’água (Cave of the Water Mother) on the Fontes beach, outside the protected area. This has been created by wave action on the cliffs, and is much visited by people. It has been degraded by the visitors, and is at risk of collapse.

Implementation of the protected area does not appear to have had a significant effect in slowing down degradation of the cliffs. It has therefore been proposed to implement a buffer zone, or to implement a larger Environmental Protection Area around the cliffs including the Morro Branco and Fontes beaches so as to better manage the site.

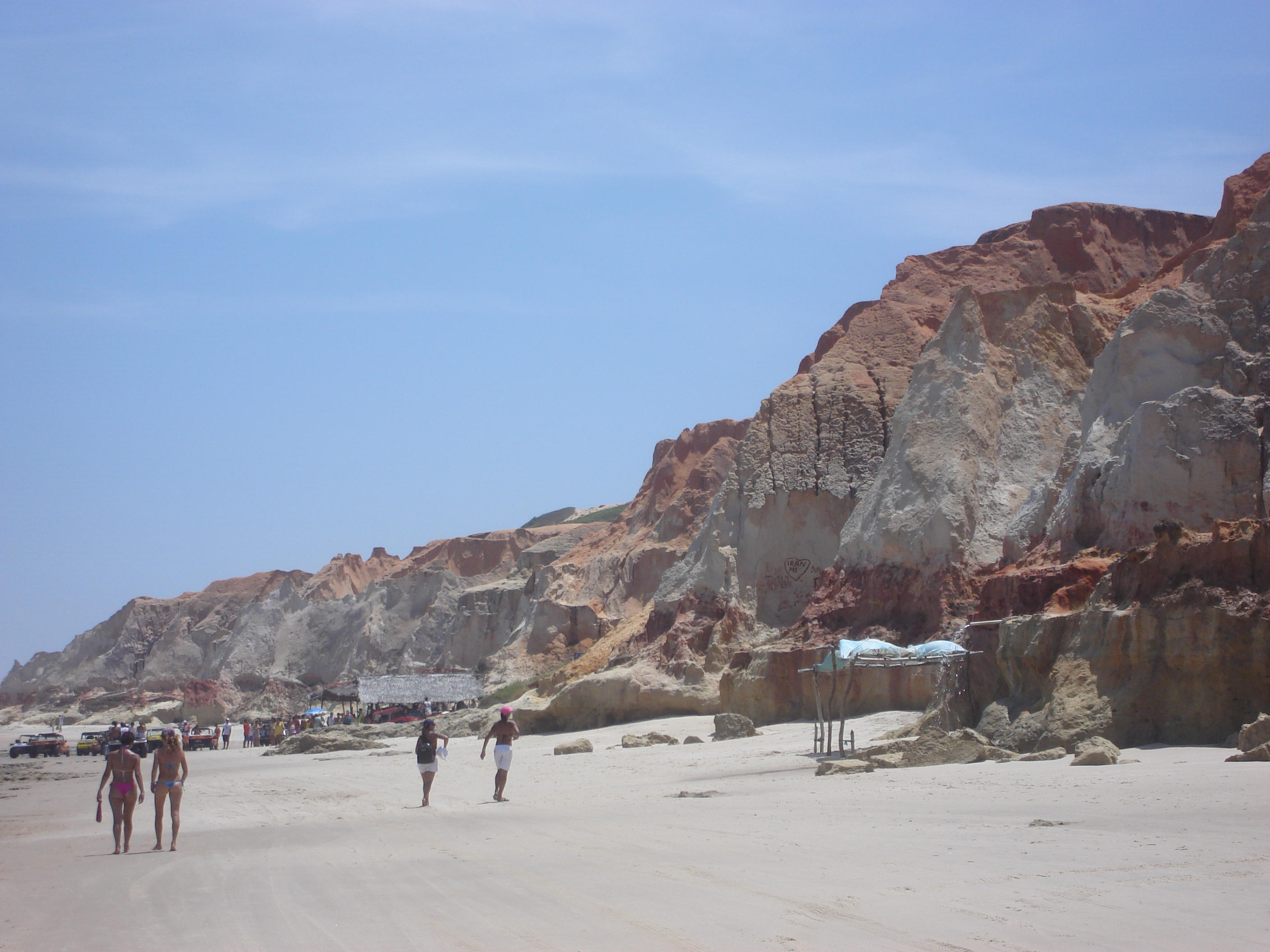
Tourists at the site

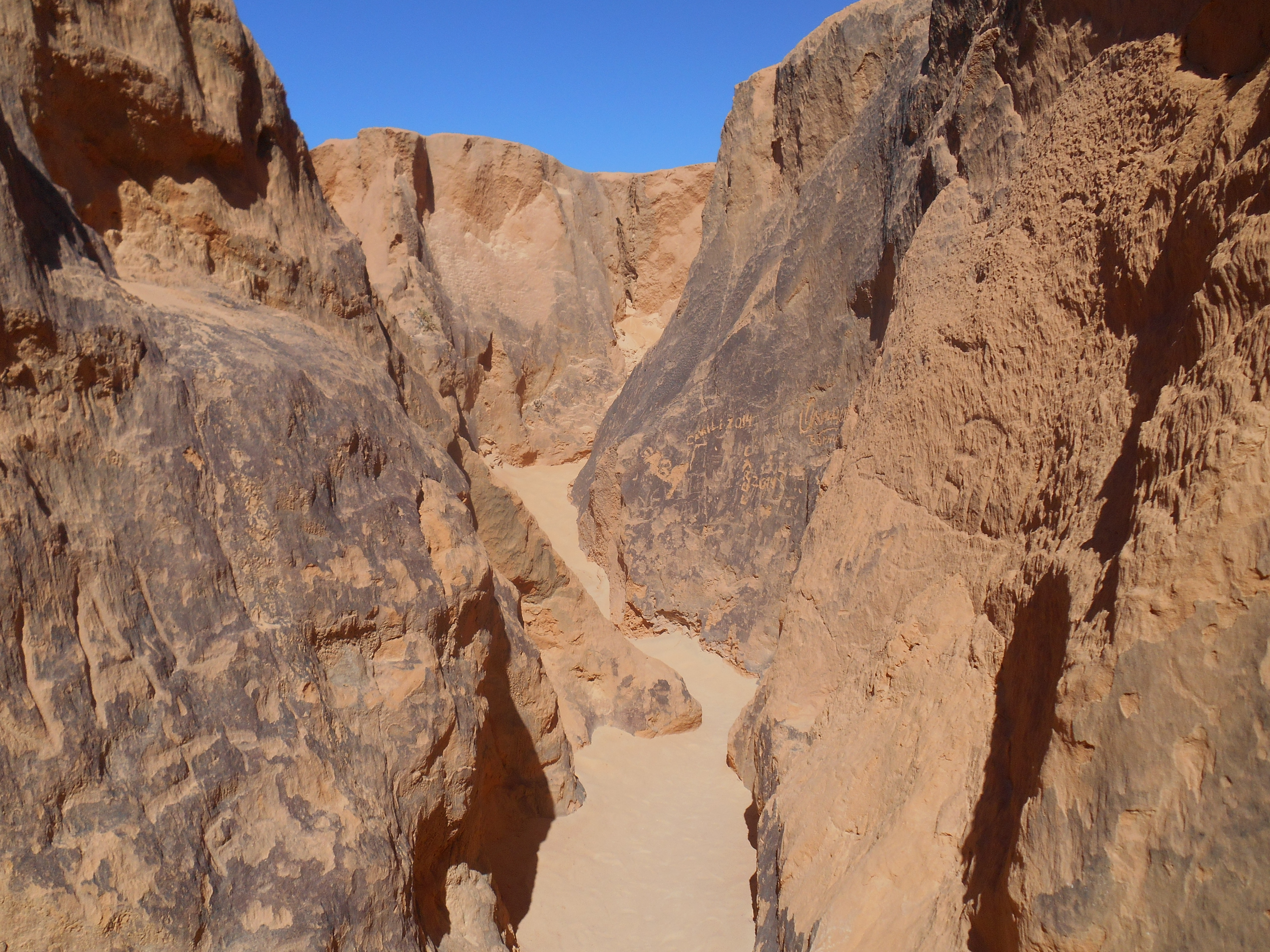
Labyrinth

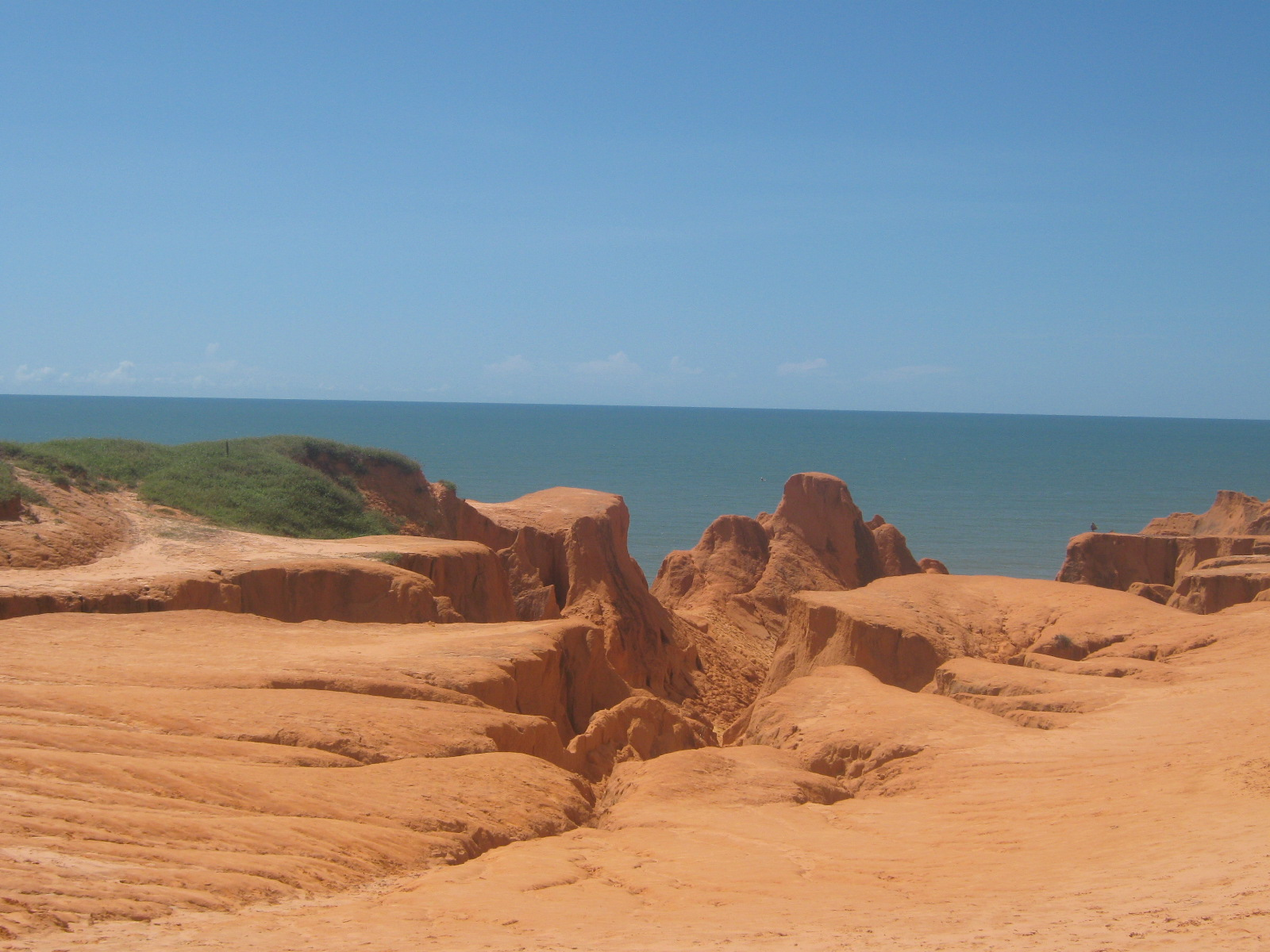
View from above Morro Branco beach

== Sources ==
- Clícia Weyne (2004-03-06), Decreto Torna Falésias de Beberibe Monumento Natural (in Portuguese), Estado do Ceará, archived from the original on 2016-06-03
- Oliveira Silva, Juliana Maria (2008), Monumento Natural das Falésias de Beberibe (PDF), Universidade Federal do Ceará
- Oliveira Silva, Juliana Maria; Silva, Edson Vicente da (May–August 2012), "Planejamento ambiental em uma unidade de conservação no município de Beberibe – Ceará", Geografia Ensino & Pesquisa (in Portuguese), 16 (2), ISSN 2236-4994
