= Bruno Camacho =

Brazilian footballer (born 1985)

Personal information
- Full name: Bruno Leone Camacho da Silva
- Date of birth: 28 October 1985 (age 41)
- Place of birth: Ivaipora, Brazil
- Height: 1.87 m (6 ft 2 in)
- Position: Defender

Youth career
- 2000–2003: Londrina
- 2003–2004: Avaí

Senior career*
Years	Team	Apps	(Gls)
2006	Oeste		
2007	Atlético Sorocaba		
2008	União Barbarense		
2008–2011	Lierse	56	(2)
2011–2012	Standaard Wetteren	27	(1)
2012	Shanghai East Asia	9	(0)
2013	União Barbarense	8	(0)
2014	Kazma SC		(2)
2015	União Barbarense	9	(0)
2016	Monte Azul		
2017	CA Juventus	18	(0)
2018	Náutico	2	(0)
2019	Miami United	8	(2)
- * Club domestic league appearances and goals as of 8 May 2020

Bruno Leone Camacho da Silva (born 28 October 1985) is a Brazilian former professional footballer who played as a defender.

== Honours ==
Shanghai East Asia

- China League One: 2012
