= Beberibe =

Municipality in Ceará, Brazil

- Municipality
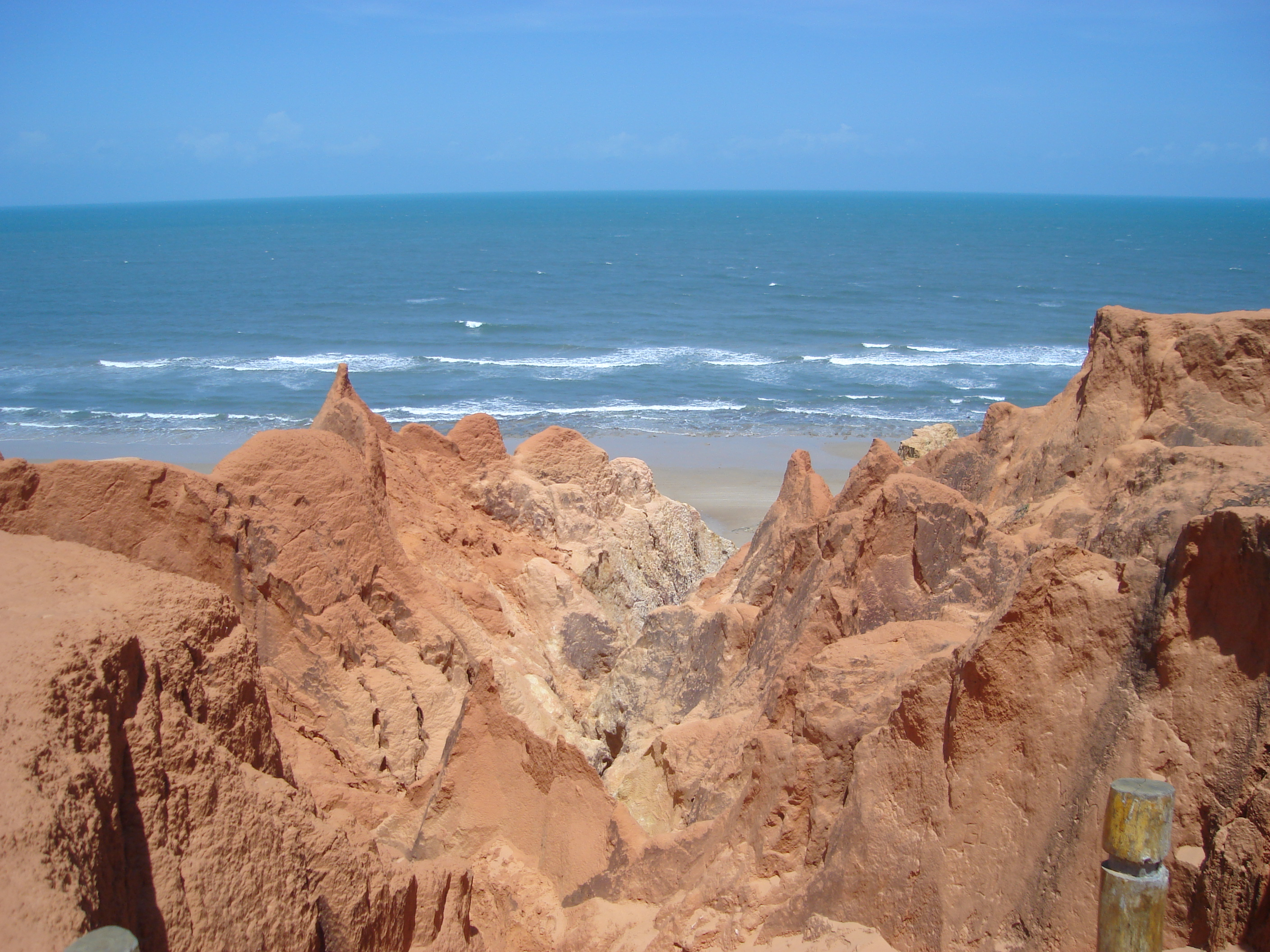
- Beberibe Cliff and Morro Branco Beach

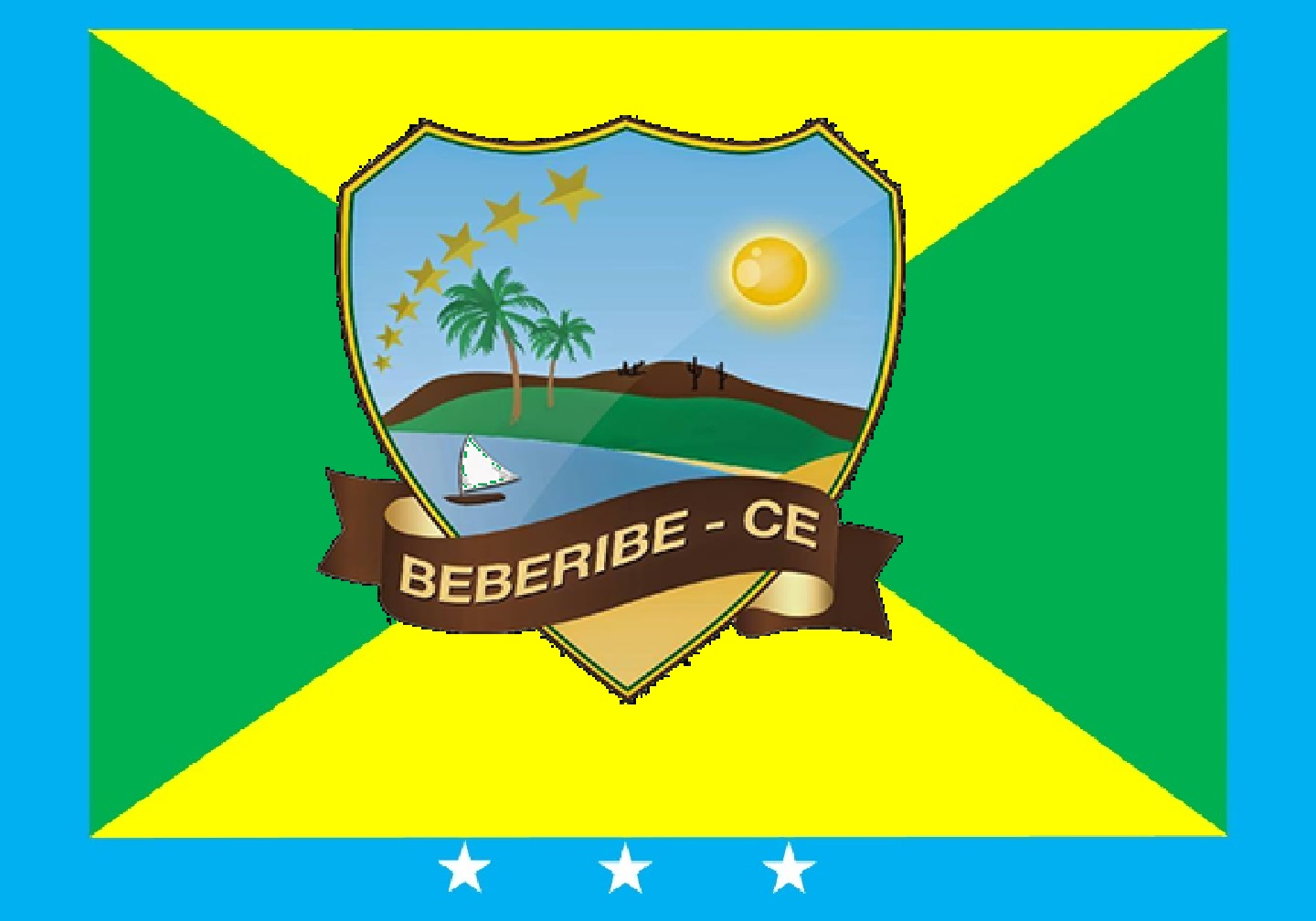
- Flag

- Location in Ceará state

- Location in Brazil
- Coordinates: 4°11′S 38°08′W
- Country: Brazil
- Region: Northeast
- State: Ceará

Population (2020)
  - Total: 53,949
- Time zone: UTC−3 (BRT)
- Website: www.beberibe.ce.gov.br

Beberibe is a municipality in the state of Ceará in Brazil. Its estimated population in 2020 is 53,949.

The municipality was created on 5 June 1892, and incorporated 18 July 1892. The name 'Beberibe' means "where the sugarcane grows".

== Geography ==
The headquarters of the municipality are located in the town of Beberibe, which is situated about 80 km SE of Fortaleza, the state capital of Ceará. Near the town of Beberibe, and extending south-east along the coastline, are many magnificent beaches, popular with tourists. Sports such as kitesurfing are also popular at many of these beaches.

The Beberibe Cliffs Natural Monument was instituted in 2004 to protect the sea cliffs of Beberibe, which at that time were being visited by 400 people per day. The designation protects the cliffs from damage, and allows visitors to access them only with authorized guides. The municipality contains the 29,794 hectares (73,620 acres) Prainha do Canto Verde Extractive Reserve, created in 2009 to protect a fishing community after a lengthy struggle against real estate speculators.

The municipality is divided into several rural districts, aside from the municipal seat of the township of Beberibe. The districts are Parajuru, Paripueira, Itapeim, Sucatinga, and Serra do Félix. The districts are named after the major towns in them.

== History ==
The first register of Beberibe was in 1691, when a small cluster of buildings were built on the "sesmaria" given to Manuel Nogueira Cardoso, Sebastião Dias Freire, João Carvalho Nóbrega and Capitão Domingos Ferreira Chaves.

But it was not until the start of the 19th century that the village became occupied, when Baltazar Ferreira do Vale, a resident of Riacho Fundo, in Cascavel, and Pedro Queiroz Lima, a resident from the farm of Mirador, in Aquiraz, bought farms there. The farm of Baltazar was suitable for population, and the town of Beberibe developed from there.

The area around Beberibe was originally named Uruanda by the native peoples of Brazil, and Beberibe was the name of the plot of land owned by Brasiliano Ferreira de Araújo, which is currently the site of the city's municipal headquarters. Brasiliano donated some of this land for the construction of the local church, which encouraged rapid growth of the town. The church was inaugurated in 1875, by which time the town was widely known as Beberibe. The Municipality of Beberibe was created in 1892, and fell in the judicial district of Cascavel.

However, the status of Beberibe as a Municipality or a District continually changed up until 1951, when, petitioned by Appeals Court judge Boanerges Facó, the governor Raul Barbosa passed a law establishing Beberibe as a municipality, and the autonomy which came with such a designation. It was not until 1955, however, that the Municipality was officially installed.

Beberibe, as its name origin may suggest, experienced rapid economic growth as a result of the construction of numerous sugar mills in the region. The wealth which was produced by the rapadura industry led to the city being nicknamed "Vila Rica" (Rich Town). Many mills have now gone bankrupt, and the rapadura industry declined, so the name no longer applies.

== Notable people ==
- Dudu Beberibe (born 1992), footballer
- Luis Otávio (born 2007), footballer
