= Robinho (footballer, born 1998) =

Brazilian footballer

Personal information
- Full name: Robson José Brilhante Martins
- Date of birth: 20 October 1998 (age 28)
- Place of birth: Recife, Brazil
- Height: 1.76 m (5 ft 9 in)
- Position: Forward

Team information
- Current team: Inter de Limeira
- Number: 16

Youth career
- Santa Cruz

Senior career*
Years	Team	Apps	(Gls)
2016–2017	Santa Cruz	0	(0)
2017	América-PE	4	(1)
2017–2019	Náutico	40	(10)
2018	→ Goiás (loan)	5	(1)
2019	→ Red Bull Bragantino (loan)	12	(1)
2020–2022	Red Bull Bragantino	5	(0)
2020–2021	→ CRB (loan)	13	(0)
2021	→ Paysandu (loan)	24	(1)
2022	→ Náutico (loan)	31	(5)
2023	CSA	19	(0)
2024	Caxias	19	(1)
2025	ABC FC	0	(0)
2025	Itabaiana	16	(1)
2026–	Inter de Limeira	16	(0)
- * Club domestic league appearances and goals as of 26 August 2023

Robson José Brilhante Martins (born 20 October 1998), commonly known as Robinho, is a Brazilian professional footballer who plays as a forward for Inter de Limeira.
