= Vitinho (footballer, born 1990) =

Brazilian footballer

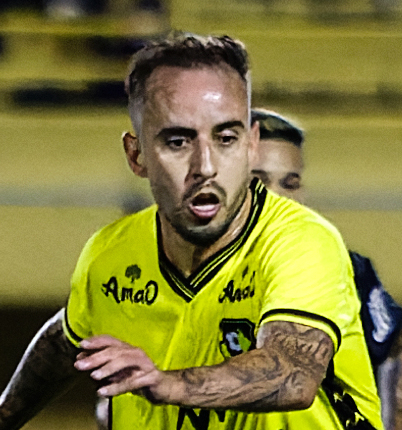
- Vitinho with São Bernardo in 2023

Personal information
- Full name: Victor Hugo Machado Maia Mesquita
- Date of birth: 8 June 1990 (age 36)
- Place of birth: Juiz de Fora, Brazil
- Height: 1.76 m (5 ft 9 in)
- Position: Attacking midfielder

Youth career
- 2007: Tupynambás
- 2008–2009: Sport Juiz de Fora

Senior career*
Years	Team	Apps	(Gls)
2010	Sport Juiz de Fora		
2011	Tupi	15	(3)
2012	Mogi Mirim	17	(1)
2013	Oeste	4	(0)
2013–2015	Mogi Mirim	54	(2)
2015–2017	Botafogo-SP	38	(0)
2018	Bragantino	32	(4)
2018	Atlético Goianiense	10	(0)
2019	Bragantino	12	(0)
2019	Red Bull Bragantino	3	(0)
2019	Paraná	11	(1)
2020	Santo André	12	(0)
2020	Paraná	10	(1)
2021–2025	São Bernardo	59	(10)
2026	São Bento	2	(0)
2026	São José-SP	0	(0)
- * Club domestic league appearances and goals as of 19:48, 12 July 2026 (UTC)

Victor Hugo Machado Maia Mesquita (born 8 June 1990), commonly known as Vitinho, is a Brazilian footballer who plays as an attacking midfielder.

== Career ==
Born in Juiz de Fora, Minas Gerais, Vitinho played for local sides Tupynambás and Sport Juiz de Fora as a youth, before being a part of the Tupi squad which achieved promotion as champions in the 2011 Série D. In December of that year, he left and moved to Mogi Mirim.

Ahead of the 2013 season, Vitinho signed for Oeste, but returned to Mogi in May of that year. In July 2015, after being separated from the squad, he terminated his link with the latter club, and subsequently agreed to a deal with Botafogo-SP.

On 24 October 2017, Vitinho left Botafogo as his contract was due to expire, and joined Bragantino in December. He moved to Série B side Atlético Goianiense in September 2018, but returned to Braga three months later.

On 27 August 2019, Vitinho agreed to a deal with Paraná also in the second division. He moved to Santo André in December, but returned to his previous club on 17 September.

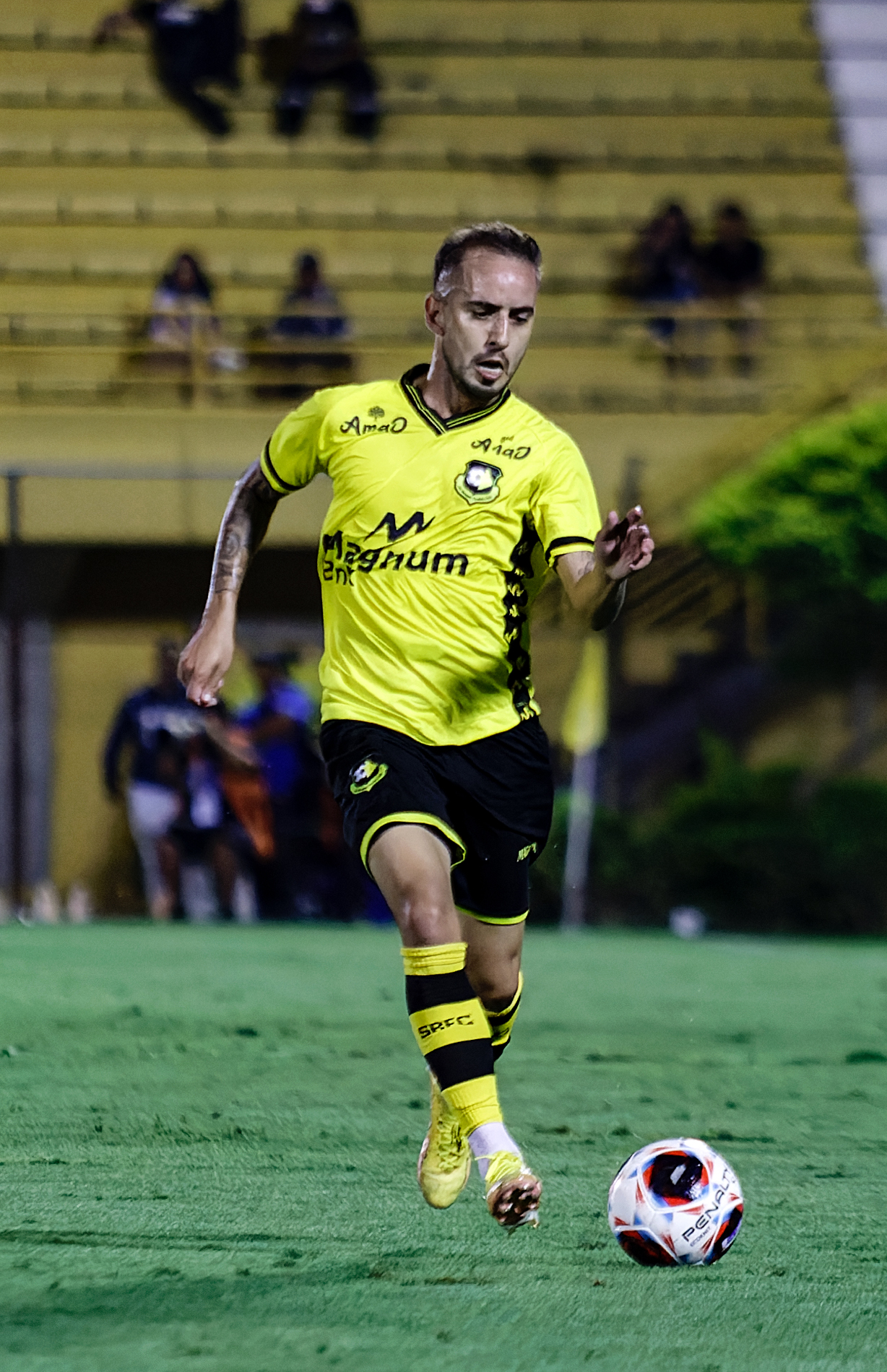
Vitinho in action for São Bernardo in 2023

On 20 January 2021, Vitinho was announced at São Bernardo. Regularly used, he was a key unit of the club in the 2023 Campeonato Paulista, scoring four goals and providing four assists in just nine matches before suffering a knee injury in February, which sidelined him for the remainder of the year.

Upon returning, Vitinho lost space at Bernô before departing the club on 2 December 2025. The following 19 January, he joined São Bento, but only featured in two matches before leaving for São José-SP on 9 July.

== Career statistics ==
As of 17 November 2026.

Club	Season	League			State league		Cup (Note: Includes Copa do Brasil, Copa Paulino Alcantara)		Continental		Other		Total	
Club	Season	Division	Apps	Goals	Apps	Goals	Apps	Goals	Apps	Goals	Apps	Goals	Apps	Goals
Tupi	2011	Série D	15	3	2	0	—		—		—		17	3
Mogi Mirim	2012	Série D	6	1	11	0	—		—		—		17	1
Oeste	2013	Série B	—		4	0	—		—		—		4	0
Mogi Mirim	2013	Série C	13	0	—		—		—		—		13	0
Mogi Mirim	2014	Série C	16	1	7	1	—		—		—		23	2
Mogi Mirim	2015	Série B	7	0	11	0	—		—		—		18	0
Mogi Mirim	Total		36	1	18	1	—		—		—		54	2
Botafogo-SP	2015	Série D	13	0	—		—		—		—		13	0
Botafogo-SP	2016	Série C	0	0	2	0	—		—		—		2	0
Botafogo-SP	2017	Série C	16	0	7	0	—		—		—		23	0
Botafogo-SP	Total		29	0	9	0	—		—		—		38	0
Bragantino	2018	Série C	17	3	13	1	2	0	—		—		32	4
Atlético Goianiense	2018	Série B	10	0	—		—		—		—		10	0
Bragantino	2019	Paulista	—		11	0	—		—		—		11	0
Red Bull Bragantino	2019	Série B	3	0	—		—		—		—		3	0
Paraná	2019	Série B	11	1	—		—		—		—		11	1
Santo André	2020	Paulista	—		10	0	2	0	—		—		12	0
Paraná	2020	Série B	10	1	—		—		—		—		10	1
São Bernardo	2021	Paulista A2	—		7	1	—		—		10 (Note: Appearance(s) in Copa Paulista)	1	17	2
São Bernardo	2022	Série D	18	3	11	2	—		—		—		29	5
São Bernardo	2023	Série C	0	0	9	4	—		—		—		9	4
São Bernardo	2024	Série C	8	0	2	0	1	0	—		—		11	0
São Bernardo	2025	Série C	2	0	2	0	—		—		—		11	0
São Bernardo	Total		28	3	31	7	1	0	—		10	1	70	11
São Bento	2026	Paulista A2	—		2	0	—		—		—		2	0
São José-SP	2026	Paulista A2	—		—		—		—		7	0	7	0
Career total			165	13	111	9	5	0	0	0	17	1	298	23

== Honours ==
Tupi

- Campeonato Brasileiro Série D: 2011

Botafogo-SP

- Campeonato Brasileiro Série D: 2015

Red Bull Bragantino

- Campeonato Brasileiro Série B: 2019

São Bernardo

- Campeonato Paulista Série A2: 2021
- Copa Paulista: 2021

São José-SP

- Copa Paulista: 2026
