= José Ortigoza =

Paraguayan footballer (born 1987)

José María Ortigoza
Personal information
- Full name: José María Ortigoza Ortiz
- Date of birth: 1 April 1987 (age 39)
- Place of birth: Asunción, Paraguay
- Height: 1.80 m (5 ft 11 in)
- Position: Forward

Youth career
- 2004–2005: Sol de América

Senior career*
Years	Team	Apps	(Gls)
2004–2012	Sol de América	101	(29)
2009	→ Palmeiras (loan)	32	(4)
2010	→ Ulsan Hyundai (loan)	25	(17)
2011	→ Cruzeiro (loan)	24	(2)
2012	Shandong Luneng	10	(2)
2013	Ventforet Kofu	8	(1)
2013	Cerro Porteño	19	(5)
2014	Atlas	12	(2)
2014–2017	Cerro Porteño	92	(34)
2018	Náutico	16	(7)
2018	Paraná	5	(0)
2019	Guaraní	41	(14)
2020	Cerro Porteño	13	(1)
2021	Sol de América	9	(1)
2021–2022	12 de Octubre	20	(4)
2023–2024	Sol de América	30	(4)

International career
- Paraguay U23
2010–2015	Paraguay	6	(3)
- * Club domestic league appearances and goals

José María Ortigoza Ortiz (Latin American Spanish: [xoˈse oɾtiˈɣosa]; born 1 April 1987) is a Paraguayan former football striker.

== Career ==
=== Club ===
Ortigoza started his career with the Paraguayan club Sol de América, where he played alongside Pablo Zeballos. He quickly made a good impression and established himself as one of the team's best players, finishing second in goal-scoring in the Apertura 2008 tournament along with Julio Aguilar. In 2009, Ortigoza was transferred to Palmeiras.

In January 2010, Ortigoza was loaned out to the K-League side Ulsan Hyundai FC from Sol de América.

In January 2011, he signed for Brazilian club Cruzeiro EC on loan.

Ortigoza transferred to Chinese Super League side Shandong Luneng in July 2012. However, after scoring 2 goals in 10 appearances, he was released by Shandong in February 2013.

Ortigoza signed a contract with J1 League club Ventforet Kofu on 22 March 2013. However, after scoring only 1 goal in 8 appearances, he was released by Kofu in June 2013.

=== International ===
On 11 November 2010, he earned his first international goal in a match against Hong Kong, scoring two goals.

== International goals ==
#	Date	Venue	Opponent	Score	Result	Competition
1	17 November 2010	Hong Kong Stadium	Hong Kong	7-0	Win	Friendly Match
2	17 November 2010	Hong Kong Stadium	Hong Kong	7-0	Win	Friendly Match
3	15 February 2012	Estadio Feliciano Cáceres	Chile	2-0	Win	Friendly Match

== Honours ==
=== Club ===
Sol de América

- División Intermedia: 1
  - Winner: 2006
