= Rafael Assis (footballer, born 1993) =

Brazilian footballer

Personal information
- Full name: Rafael Assis da Cruz Rodrigues
- Date of birth: 2 April 1993 (age 33)
- Place of birth: Visconde do Rio Branco, Brazil
- Height: 1.77 m (5 ft 10 in)
- Position: Forward

Team information
- Current team: Náutico

Youth career
- 2010–2012: Fluminense

Senior career*
Years	Team	Apps	(Gls)
2013–2014	Fluminense	0	(0)
2013	→ Tupi (loan)	11	(1)
2013	→ Istres (loan)	12	(0)
2014	→ Esportivo (loan)	4	(0)
2014	→ Caldense (loan)	5	(0)
2014	Betinense		
2015	Tupi	8	(0)
2016	Anápolis	17	(0)
2016–2017	Sanjoanense	25	(2)
2018–2019	Náutico	23	(1)
2020	União PR	6	(0)
2020	Portuguesa Santista	3	(0)
2021	Itabaiana	6	(1)
2022	Costa Rica EC	14	(1)
2023	Clube Sport Sinop	8	(1)
- * Club domestic league appearances and goals as of 10:21, 23 February 2024

Rafael Assis da Cruz Rodrigues (born 2 April 1993), known as Rafael Assis, is a Brazilian football player who is currently a free agent.
