= Campos Gerais =

Municipality in the south of the Brazilian state of Minas Gerais

Coordinates: 21°14′06″S 45°45′32″W

- Municipality
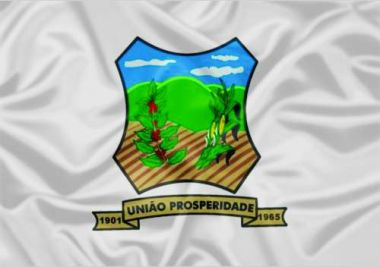
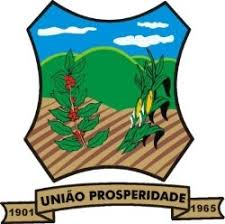
- Flag Coat of arms
- Interactive map of Campos Gerais
- Country: Brazil
- State: Minas Gerais
- Region: Southeast
- Time zone: UTC−3 (BRT)

Location of Campos Gerais in the state of Minas Gerais

Campos Gerais is a municipality in the south of the Brazilian state of Minas Gerais. The population was 28,842 in 2020 in a total area of 769 km^{2} (297 sq mi). The elevation is 1,026 m. It became a municipality in 1901.

Campos Gerais is located in the IBGE statistical microregion of Varginha. Surrounding municipalities are Alfenas, Três Pontas, Boa Esperança, Paraguaçu, Campo do Meio, Santana da Vargem and Fama. It is 295 km from Belo Horizonte and 34 km from the important coffee center of Alfenas. The Furnas Reservoir lies to the south.

The main economic activity is coffee growing. In 2006, there were 19,500 hectares planted. There was also production of rice, potatoes, beans, and corn. There were 2,270 rural properties with an agricultural area of 60,464 hectares. More than 10,000 people worked in agriculture. In the city there were several small industries including soft drink bottling plant.

The main tourist sites are the nearby Serra do Paraíso with waterfalls, a 32-metre high statue of Christ the Redeemer, the Igreja de Nossa Senhora do Carmo, built imitating the Spanish Gothic style, Vale dos Ipês Water Park, and the Praia das Amoras, a beach located on the banks of the Furnas lake. Campos Gerais is known nationally for its annual Festa do Peão celebration, dedicated to the Brazilian cowboy.

Campos Gerais has 29 primary schools, of which two of them are private as of 2006. There are three middle schools: two public and one private. In addition, there are two private institutes of higher learning—FACICA and ISEC, which have courses in Pharmacy, Nursing, Biology, and Pedagogy. Enrollment was 246 students in 2005.

In the health sector, there were 12 clinics and one private hospital with 65 beds.

Municipal Human Development Index

- MHDI. .750 (2000)
- State ranking: 280 out of 853 municipalities
- National ranking: 1,866 out of 5138 municipalities
- Life expectancy: 72
- Literacy rate: 85

== See also ==
- List of municipalities in Minas Gerais
- List of tallest statues
