= Pontalete =

Coordinates: 21°27′16″S 45°40′04″W

- District
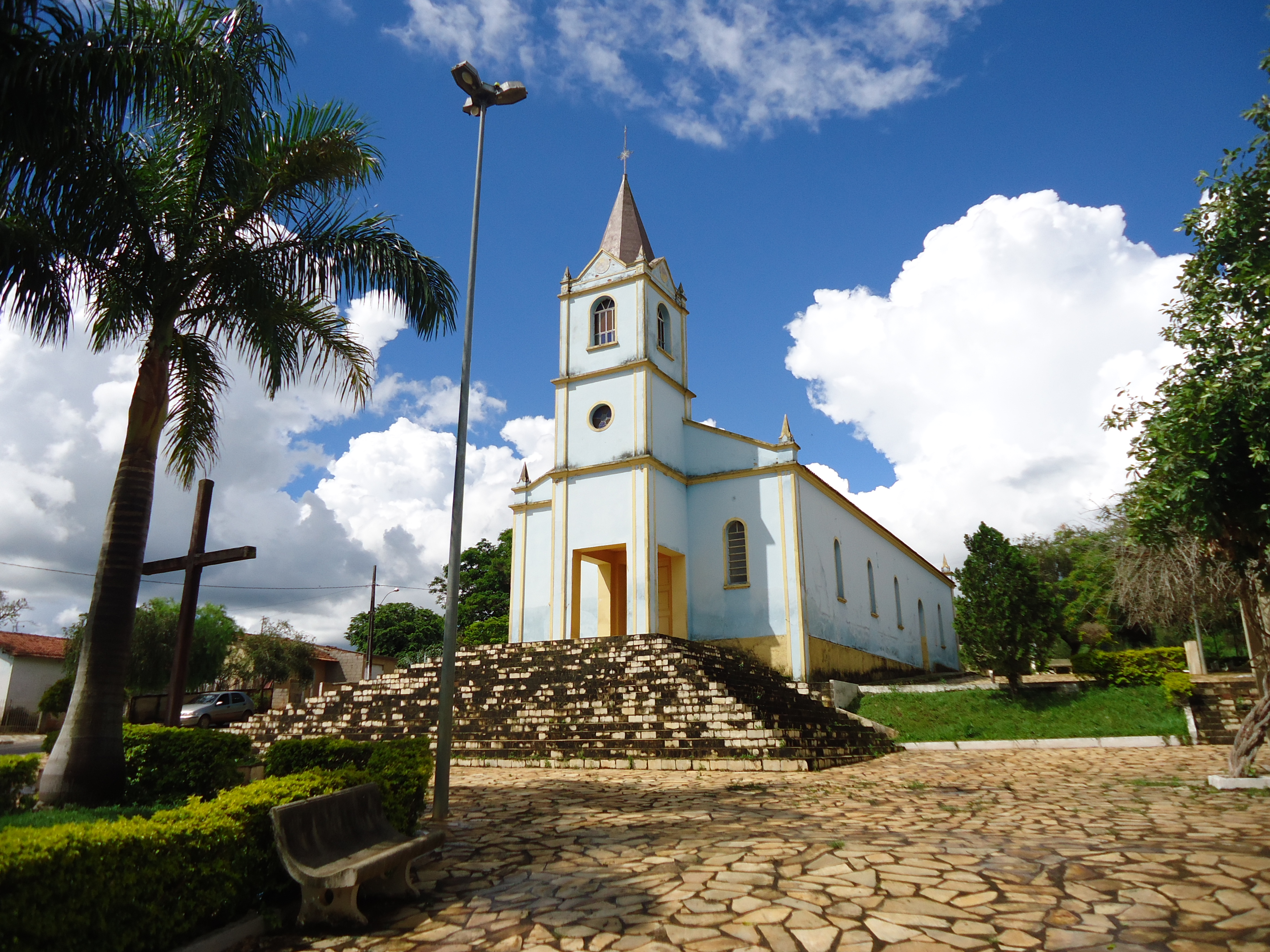
- Church of São Sebastião, in the homonymous location.

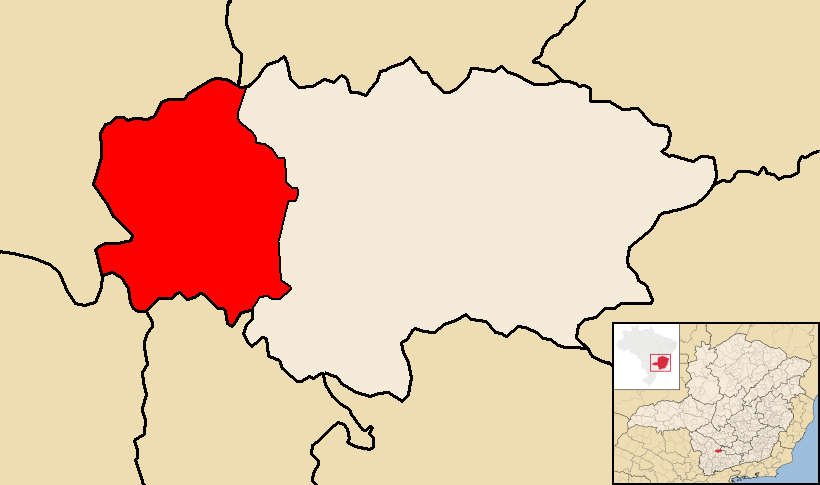
- District location in Brazil
- Country: Brazil
- Region: Minas Gerais
- Sub-region: Três Pontas

Area
  - Land: 155.4 km^{2} (60.0 sq mi)

Population (2010 Estimate)
  - Total: 2,633
  - Density: 16.94/km^{2} (43.9/sq mi)
- Time zone: UTC-2 (BRT)

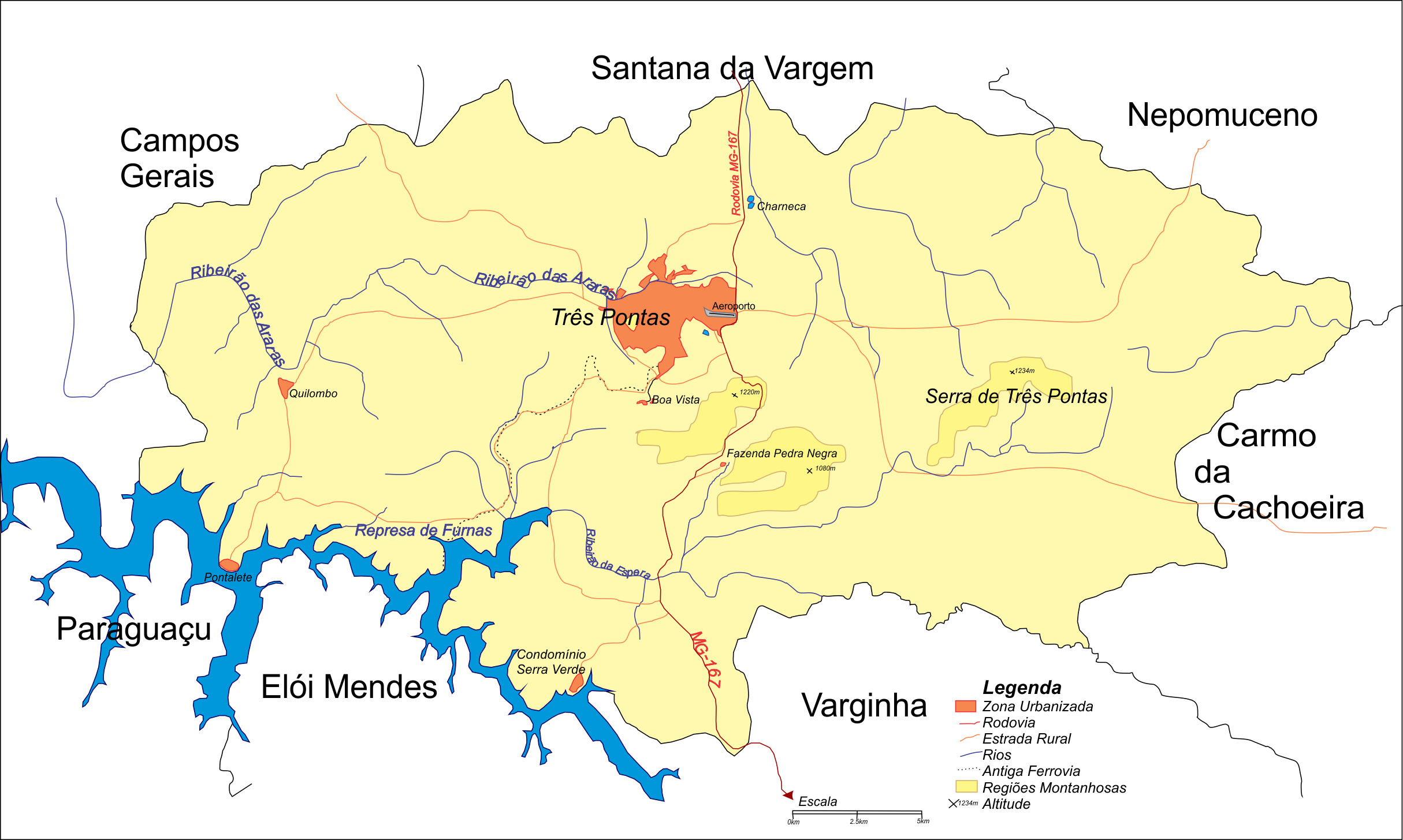
Map of Três Pontas municipality

Pontalete is a district of Três Pontas municipality in the south of Minas Gerais state, Brazil, located 23 km from the city. It is watered by Furnas Dam, being an important touristic destination. Its population is about 400 people.

Pontalete is a district that, together with the district headquarters, constitutes the Brazilian municipality of Três Pontas, in the interior of the state of Minas Gerais . Its population was estimated at 2,633 inhabitants by the Brazilian Institute of Geography and Statistics (IBGE) in 2010. Located in the western region of the municipality, it has two main populated regions, the homonymous headquarters of the district and the Quilombo Nossa Senhora do Rosário, which account for 22.6% and 4.6% of the total population of the district, respectively.

The town that gave its name to the district is located at the confluence of the Verde and Sapucaí rivers, which form the southern part of the Furnas Dam, and received this name because of the shape that the two rivers drew on the landscape. Even with the construction of the dam, this shape still exists. The population of the district is approximately three thousand inhabitants, which corresponds to about five percent of the total population of the municipality.

== History ==
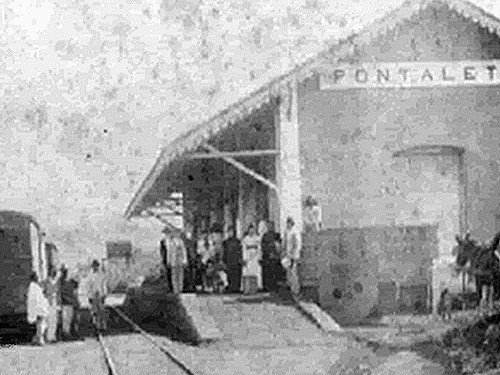
Old railway station in Pontalete.

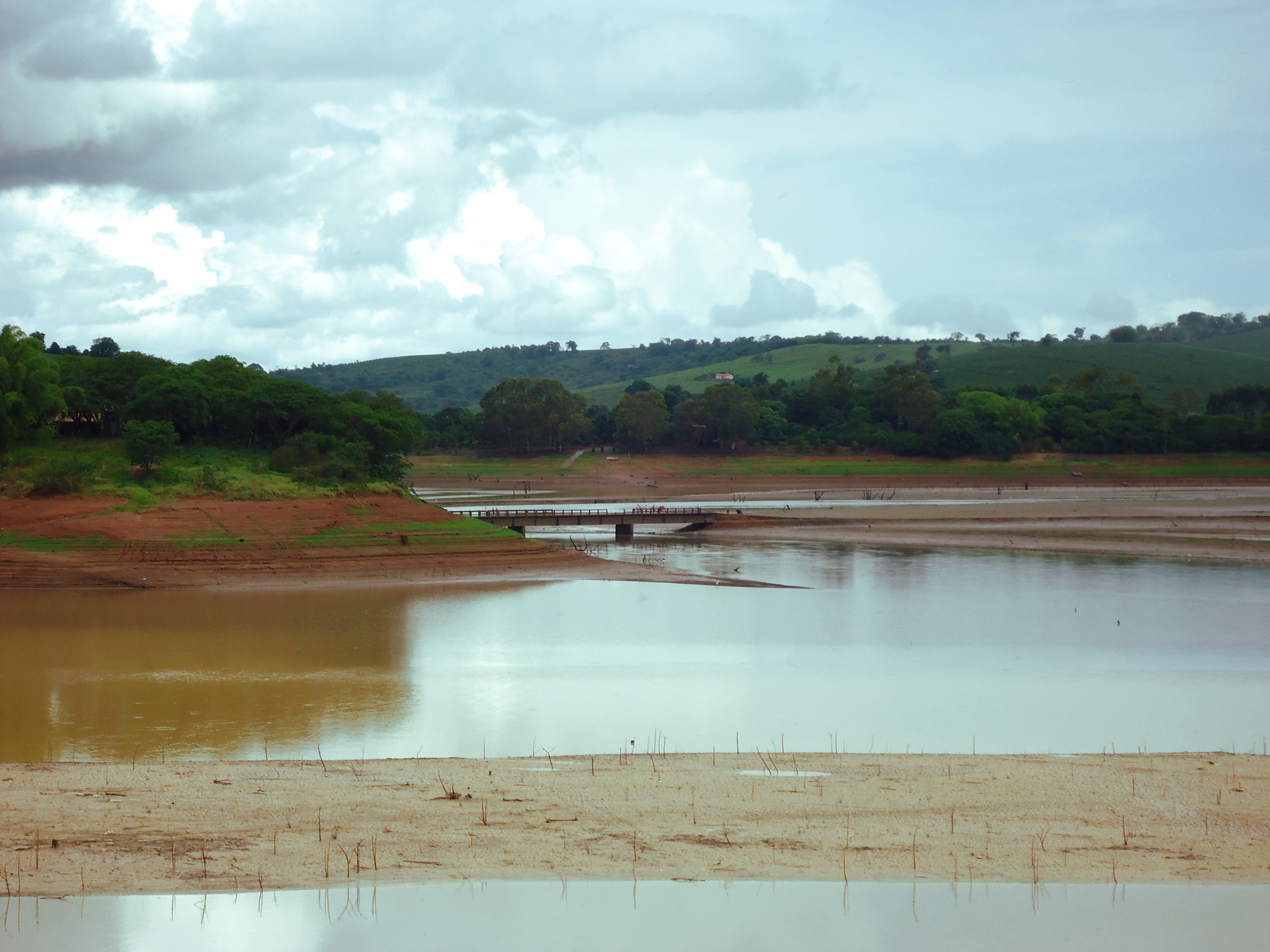
When the level of Lake Furnas is very low (as happened in 2012) it is possible to see the bridge that connected the municipality of Três Pontas to Paraguaçu, over the Rio Verde.

The district was created on November 6, 1882, under the name of Martinho Campos District, with its headquarters in the locality of the same name (which is currently called Quilombo Nossa Senhora do Rosário ). However, due to the importance that the locality of Pontalete gained over time, the municipal headquarters was transferred in 1918 to the village, although the district's name change only occurred in 1923. Since the dismemberment of the district of Santana da Vargem with its elevation to municipality, Três Pontas has been formed by the district headquarters and the district of Pontalete.

Among the reasons that led the town of Pontalete to become the seat of the district that bears its name, the construction of a railroad, the Muzambinho Railroad, which connected Muzambinho to Três Corações, stands out. One of the railway stations on the line was built in the town. There was also a dock installed on the Sapucaí River, which facilitated trade across the river. In 1930, the first bridge was built over the Verde River, connecting the town to Elói Mendes and Paraguaçu, but a major flood of the river destroyed it. Soon after, construction began on two new concrete bridges, one over the Verde River and the other over the Sapucaí River. However, with the construction of the Furnas Dam, the bridges and part of the town were flooded, which seriously harmed the development of the district.

== Demography ==
In 2010, the population of the district was estimated by the Brazilian Institute of Geography and Statistics (IBGE) at 2,633 inhabitants, of which 1,372 people (52.1%) were men and 1,261 women (47.9%). There were also a total of 1,131 permanent private households. The seat of Três Pontas had 51,227 inhabitants, thus Pontalete had 4.9% of the total population of the municipality. According to statistics released in 2000, there were 2,872 inhabitants in the district, of which 1,515 were men and 1,357 were women. 106 people lived in the urban center of Pontalete, while the remaining 2,766 inhabitants lived in the rural area of the district. The predominant age group that year, according to the IBGE, was that of people aged between zero and four years old, with a population of 334 inhabitants, 13 of whom were in urban areas and 321 in rural areas.

In 2000, 79.9% of the population over 5 years of age was literate and the average income per head of household was R$270.69, while that of the main city was R$687.84. 22.4% of those responsible for permanent private residences had no schooling, 36.2% had 1 to 3 years of schooling, 36.5% had 4 to 7 years of schooling, 3.7% had 8 to 10 years of schooling and 0.9% had more than 11 years of schooling (0.13% of which was undetermined). In that year, 23.7% of households had water supply through the general supply network, 76.2% through a well or spring. 97.2% had sewage collected through the general collection network and only 4.5% was served by garbage collection service, while in the remaining 94.5% the garbage produced was burned, buried or thrown on vacant land.

== Infrastructure and tourism ==
Pontalete has an artificial beach, being a destination to practice water sports. The region has many natural beauties.

The town of Pontalete currently has paved streets, water and sewage services (installed in 1980 with funds from Furnas Centrais Elétricas SA), electricity, and landline and mobile telephone services.The crossing of Lake Furnas is made by a ferry that connects the municipalities of Elói Mendes and Paraguaçu.By land, the connection to the city of Três Pontas is made by an unpaved road, although there is a project to build a new highway that would connect the city to Paraguaçu, passing through the town.

In 2012, a revitalization project built a large sidewalk on the waterfront, paved streets, and other infrastructure works that totaled more than two million reais in investments. The main purpose of such actions was to attract tourists to the town.In addition to its natural beauty, the location has an artificial beach as one of its main tourist attractions, as well as several leisure options for its visitors.
