= Paraguaçu =

- Municipality
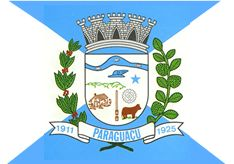
- Flag Coat of arms

- Location in Minas Gerais state

- Location in Brazil
- Coordinates: 21°32′S 45°46′W
- Country: Brazil
- Region: Southeast
- State: Minas Gerais

Area
  - Total: 424 km^{2} (164 sq mi)

Population (2020)
  - Total: 21,605
  - Density: 51.0/km^{2} (132/sq mi)
- Time zone: UTC−3 (BRT)

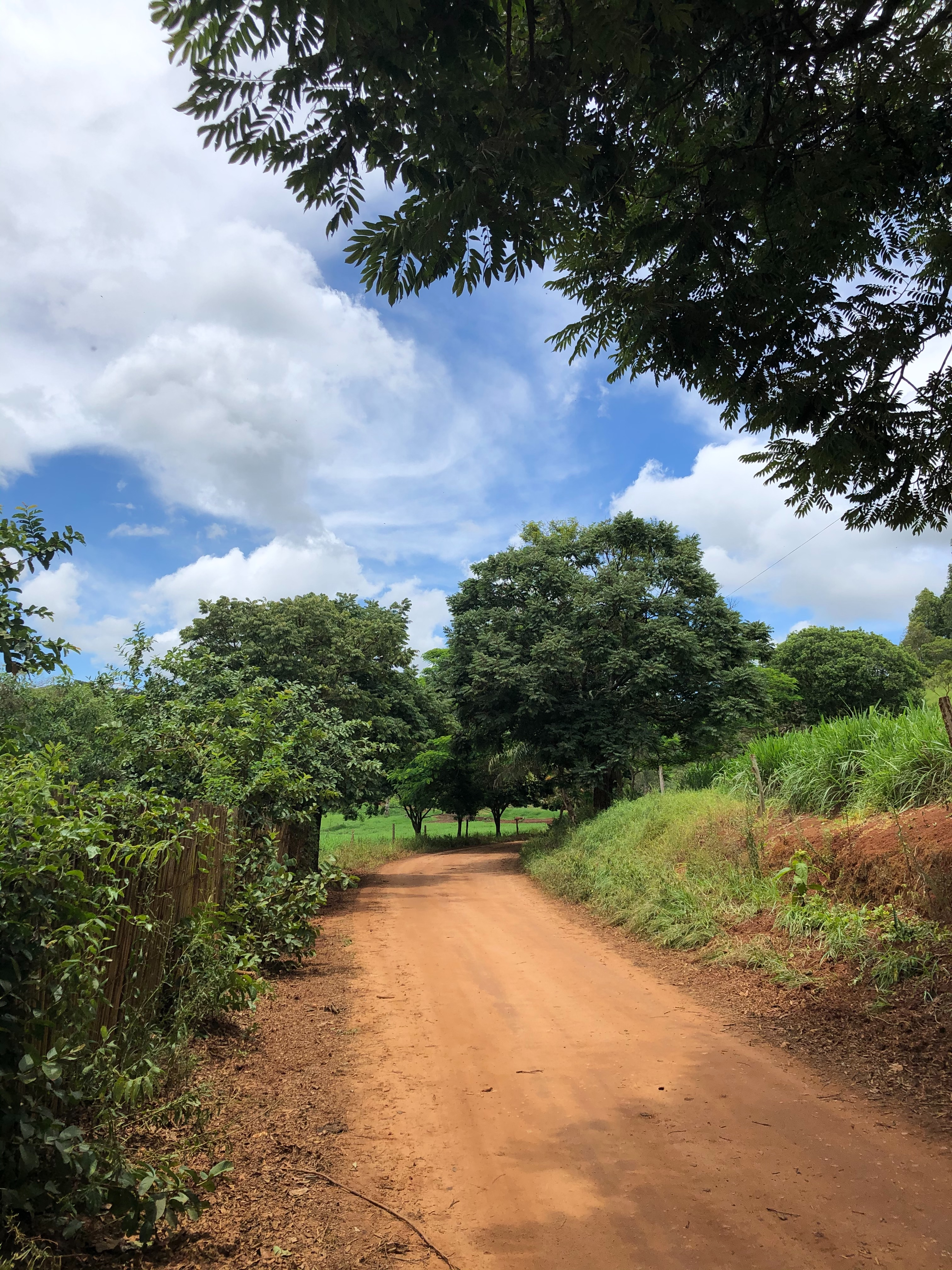
A typical view of the rural scenery around Paraguaçu

Paraguaçu is a municipality in the state of Minas Gerais in Brazil. The population is 21,605 (2020 est.) in an area of 424 km^{2} (164 sq mi). The elevation of the municipal seat is 825 m. It became a municipality in 1911.

Paraguaçu is part of the IBGE statistical microregion of Alfenas. It is 25 km west of Alfenas, to which it is linked by highway BR-491. Distances to other cities are:

- São Paulo: 315 km
- Belo Horizonte: 330 km
- Rio de Janeiro: 427 km

== Geography ==
Neighboring municipalities are Campos Gerais, Três Pontas, Eloi Mendes, Cordislândia, Machado, Alfenas and Fama.

The climate is mainly mild with rains in the months of September to April. The average annual rainfall is 1,200 millimeters. The average annual temperature is 21 °C, the average minimum is 13 °C, and the average maximum is 28 °C.

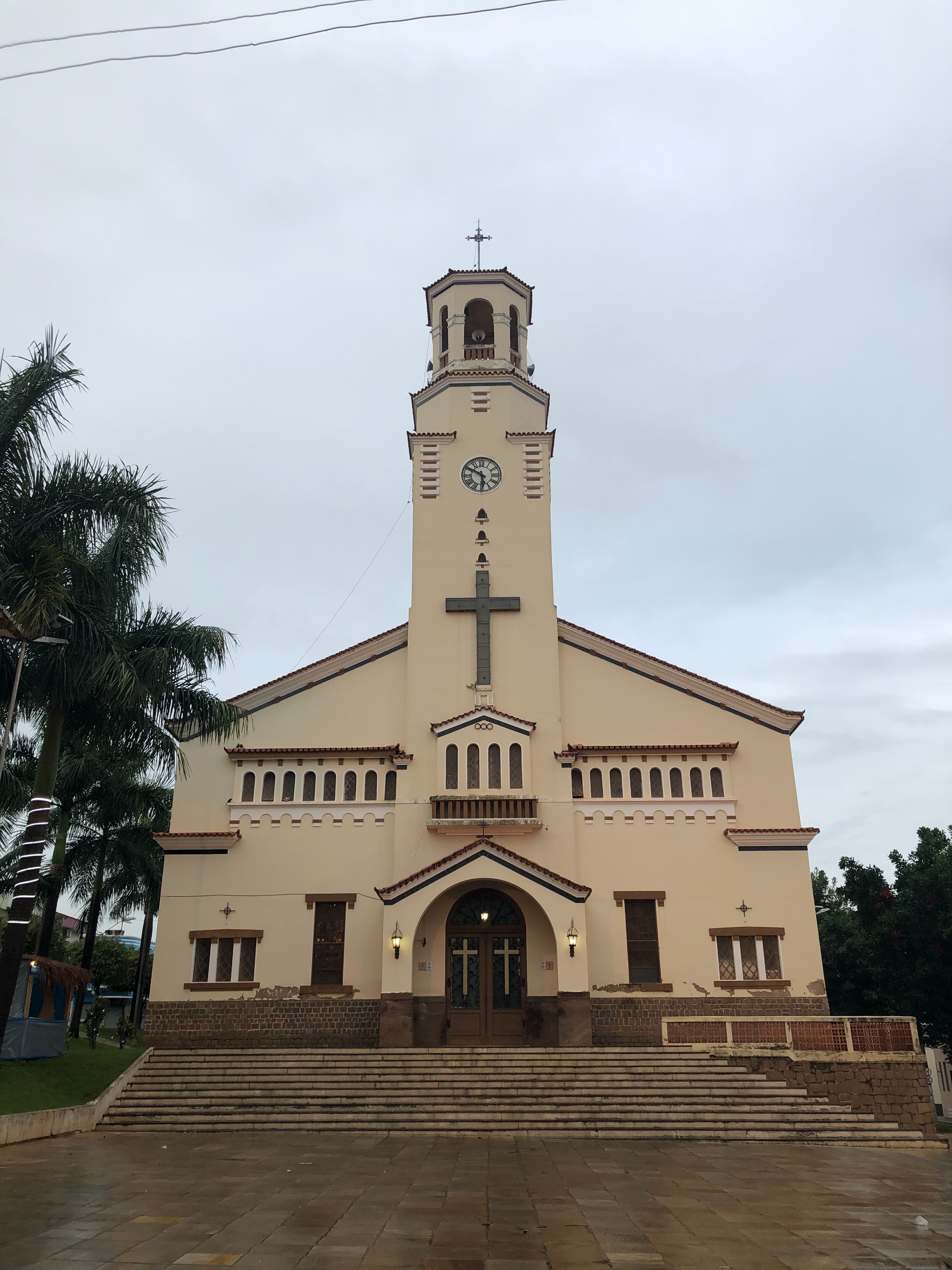
Our Lady of Mount Carmel Parish, one of the most iconic buildings in Paraguaçu.

The main economic activities are agriculture and livestock raising, with production of coffee and dairy products. There are also textile industries. The main crops are coffee (7,000 ha. in 2006), maize (5,500 ha.) and modest production of potatoes, rice, and beans.

== Economy ==
In 2006 there were 685 rural properties with a total agricultural area of 20,977 ha. of which about half was planted in crops. The landholding system can be characterized as minifundio.

Buildings designed by Virgilio Borim

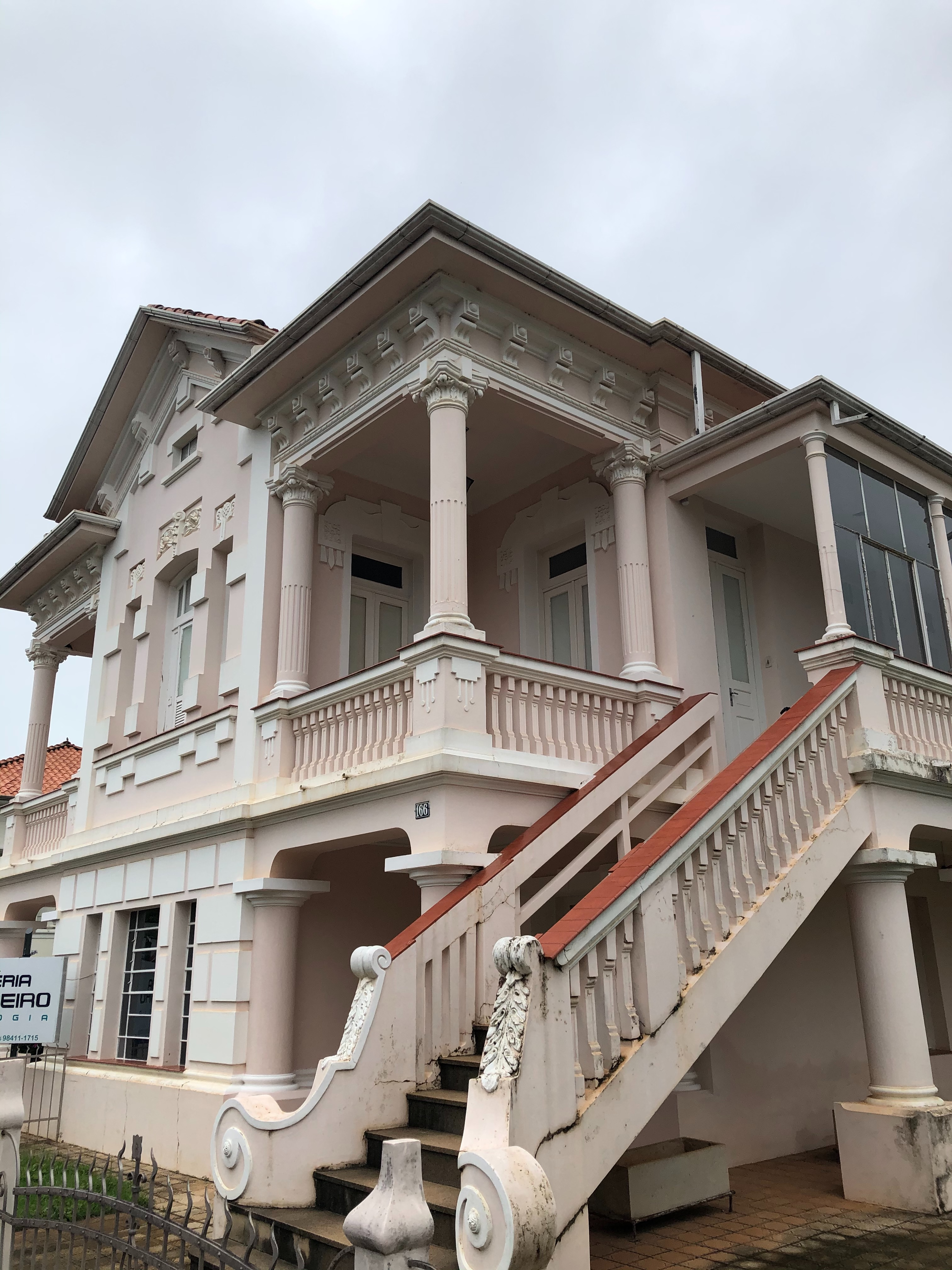

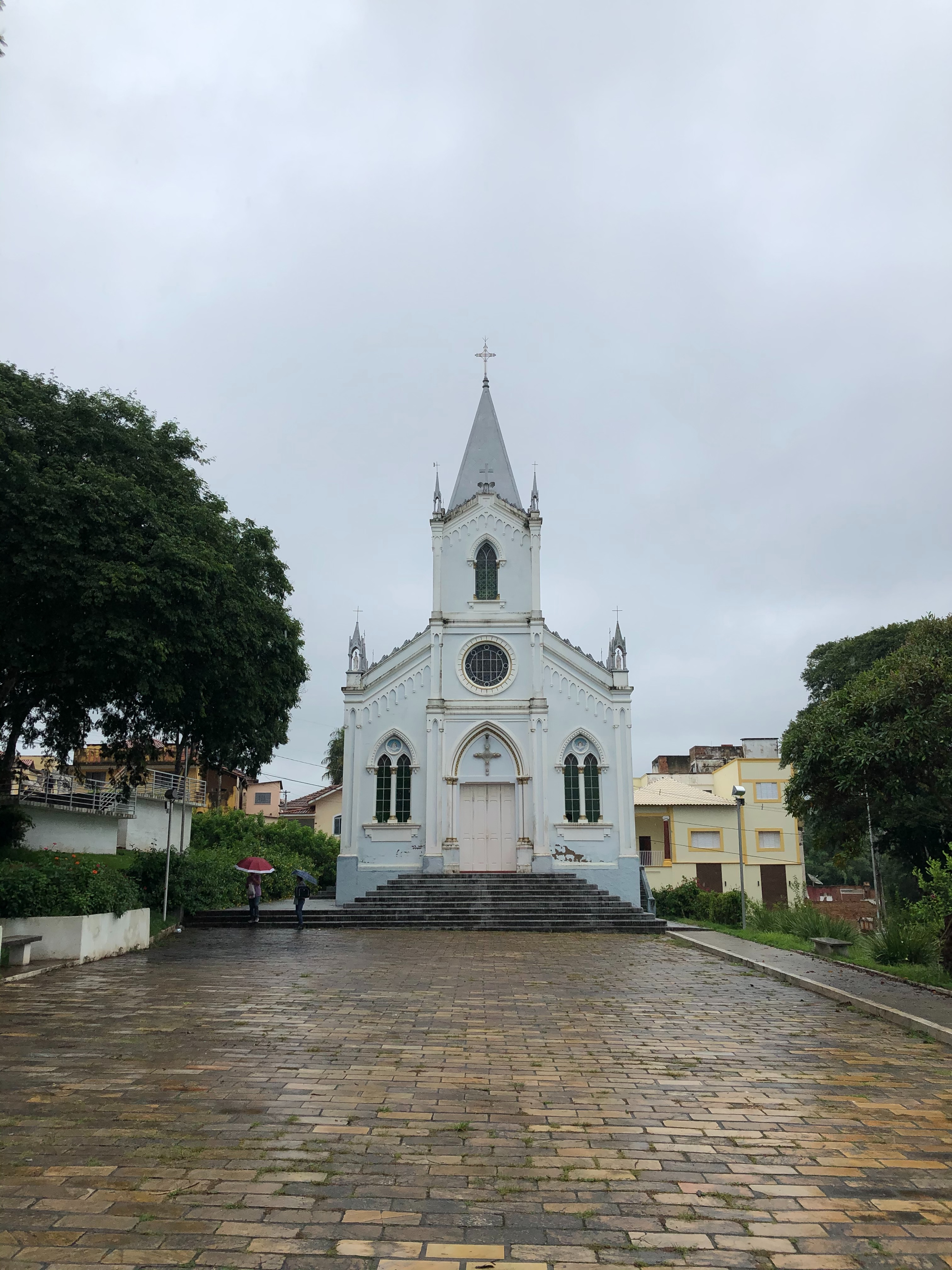
Igreja Nossa Senhora Aparecida

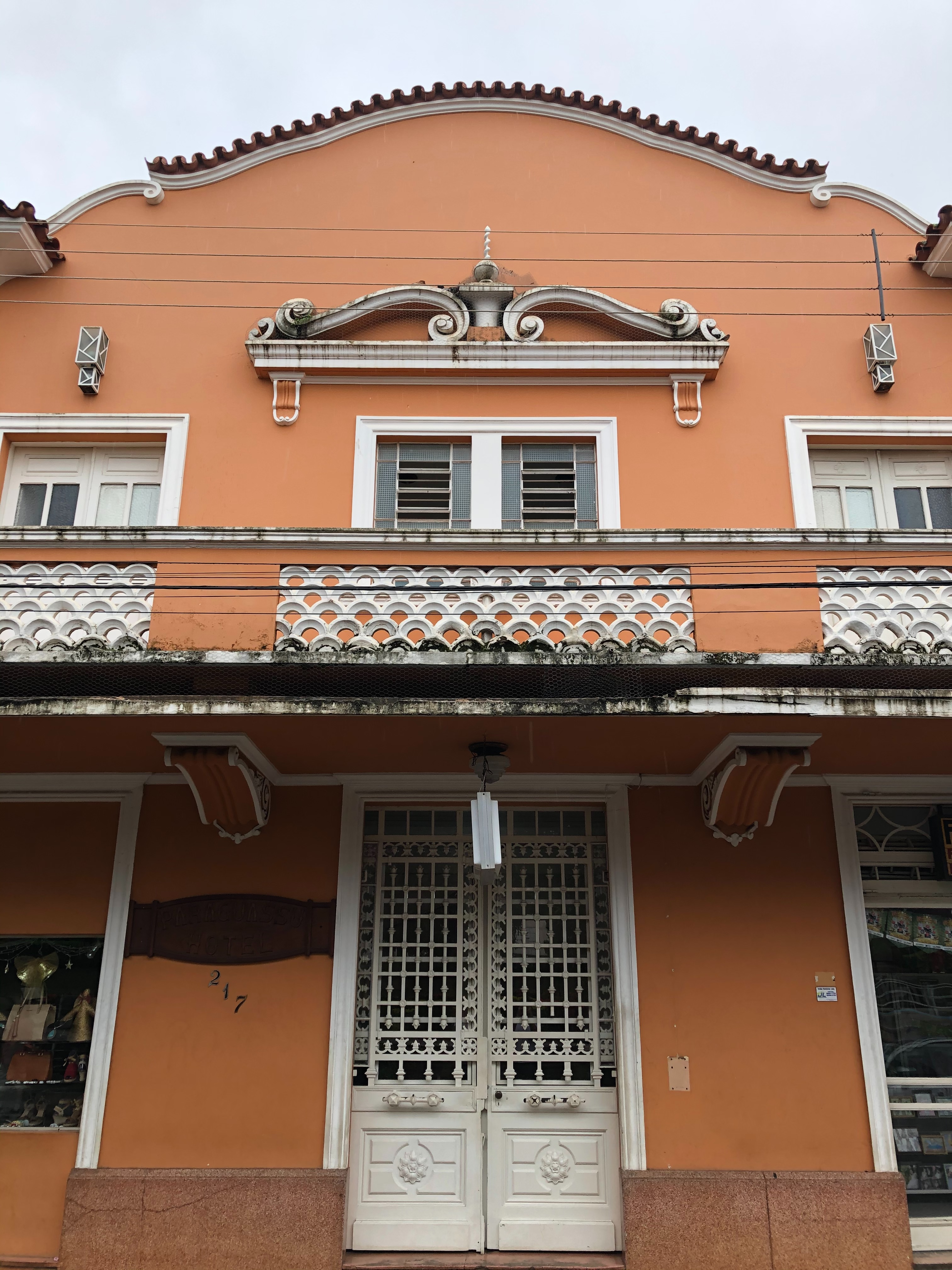
Hotel Paraguassu

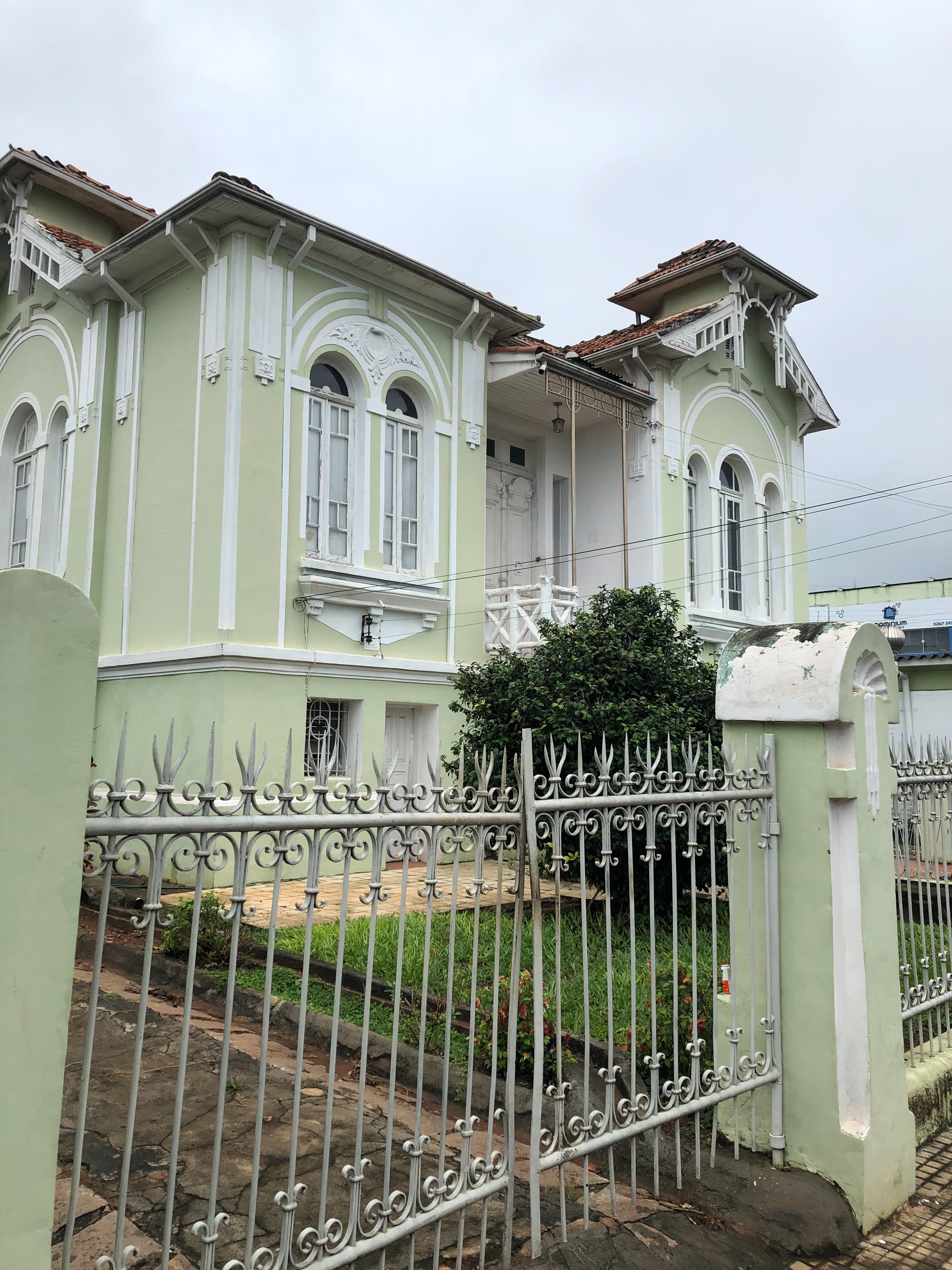

== See also ==
- List of municipalities in Minas Gerais
- Paraguaçu Paulista
