= Três Pontas =

- Municipality
- Município de Três Pontas; Municipality of Três Pontas
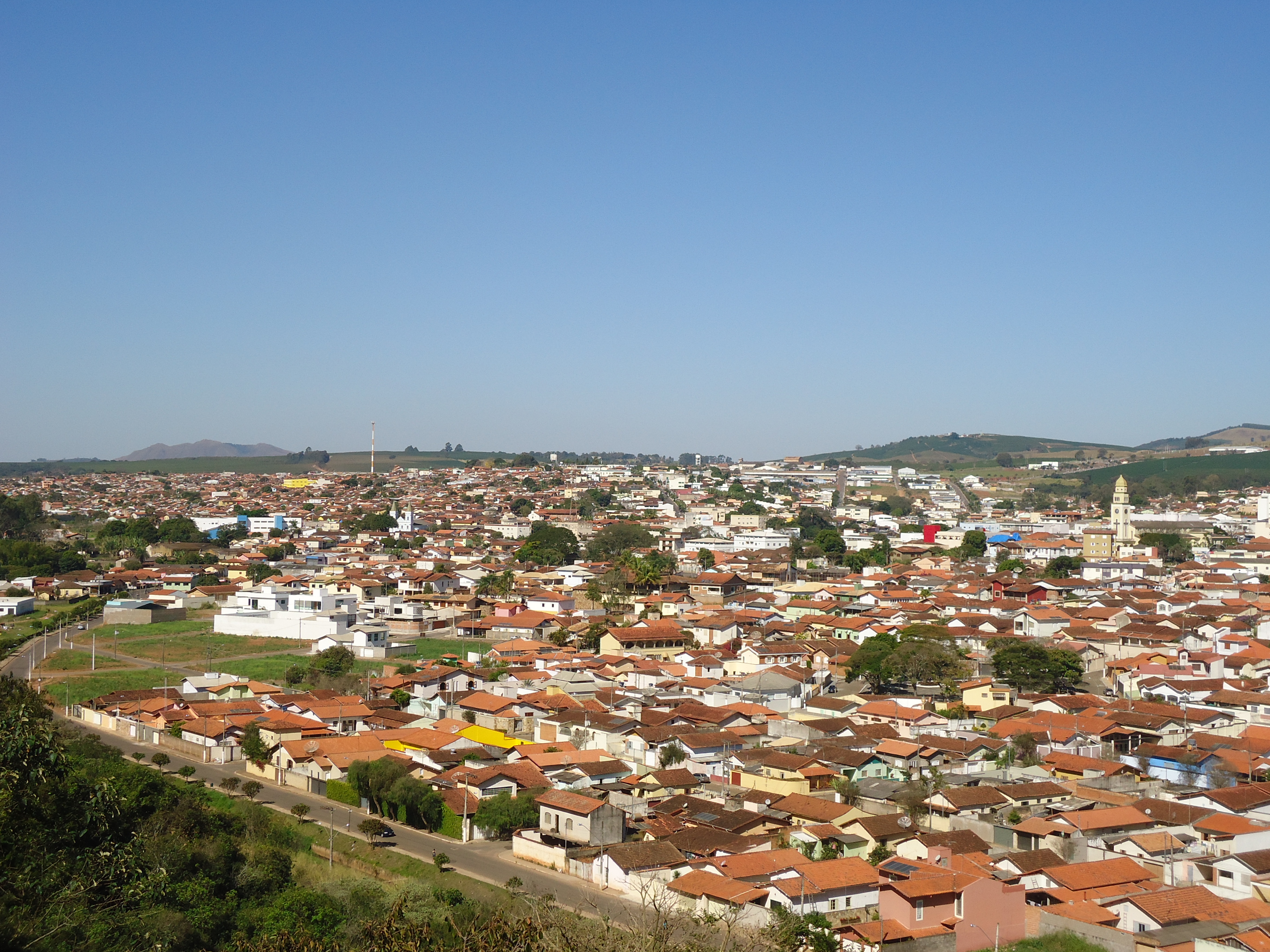
- View of part of the city.

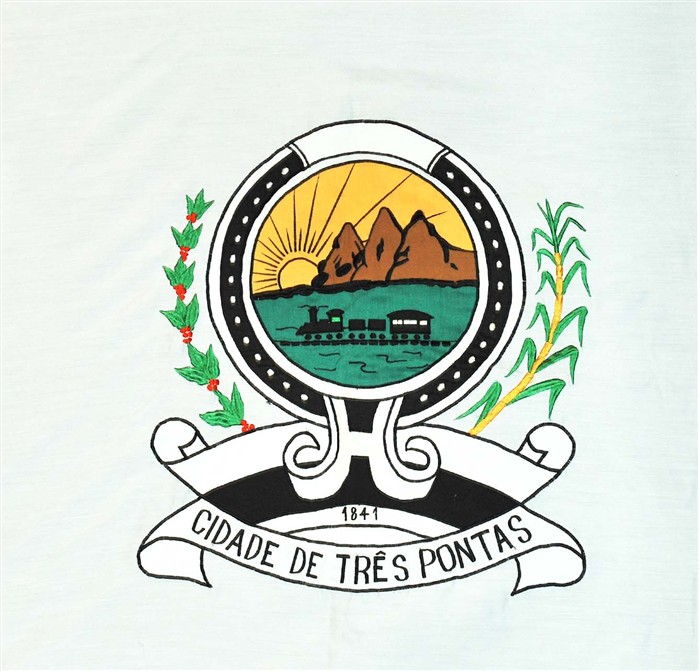
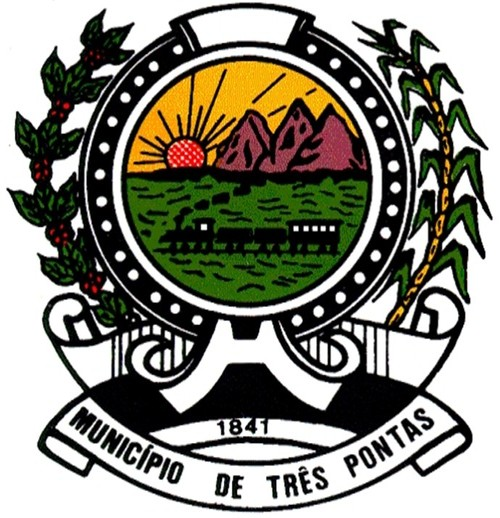
- Flag Coat of arms
- Nickname: Terra do café (Land of Coffee)
- Coordinates: 21°22′13″S 45°30′44″W
- Country: Brazil
- Region: Southeast
- State: Minas Gerais
- Founded: 1768
- Founder: Bento Ferreira de Brito

Government
  - Mayor: Luciana Ferreira Mendonça (PR)

Area
  - Total: 689.421 km^{2} (266.187 sq mi)
- Elevation: 905 m (2,969 ft)

Population (2020)
  - Total: 56,940
- Demonym: Trespontano
- Time zone: UTC-3 (UTC-3)
  - Summer (DST): UTC-2 (UTC-2)
- Postal Code (CEP): 37190-000
- Website: Prefeitura de Três Pontas

Três Pontas (Portuguese pronunciation: [ˈtɾes ˈpõtas], Three Tips) is a municipality located in southern Minas Gerais state, Brazil. The municipality has about 57,000 inhabitants and a population density of 78.12 inhabitants/km^{2}. The road MG-167 is the only paved road that passes through the city, but the Rodovia Fernão Dias (BR-381), is less than 50 km from the city centre passing through Varginha. Almost all streets of the urban zone are paved, and water and sewage services are provided to all residents.

The municipality does not have a rugged relief (the average elevation is 900m), and there are only three areas in which the altitude reaches 1100m above sea level. One of them is the Serra de Três Pontas (Three Tips Mountain), a place known in the region for its distinctive shape and natural environment. The streams Araras and Espera are the main water courses that pass through the municipality, and flow into the Furnas Dam. The rivers Verde and Sapucaí pass on the southern boundary and flow into the Furnas Dam as well. The Municipality is located on the basin of the Grande River.

The suave climate favors the growth of coffee, the main economic wealth of the city; it is known as one of the largest producers of coffee in Brazil.

== Etymology ==
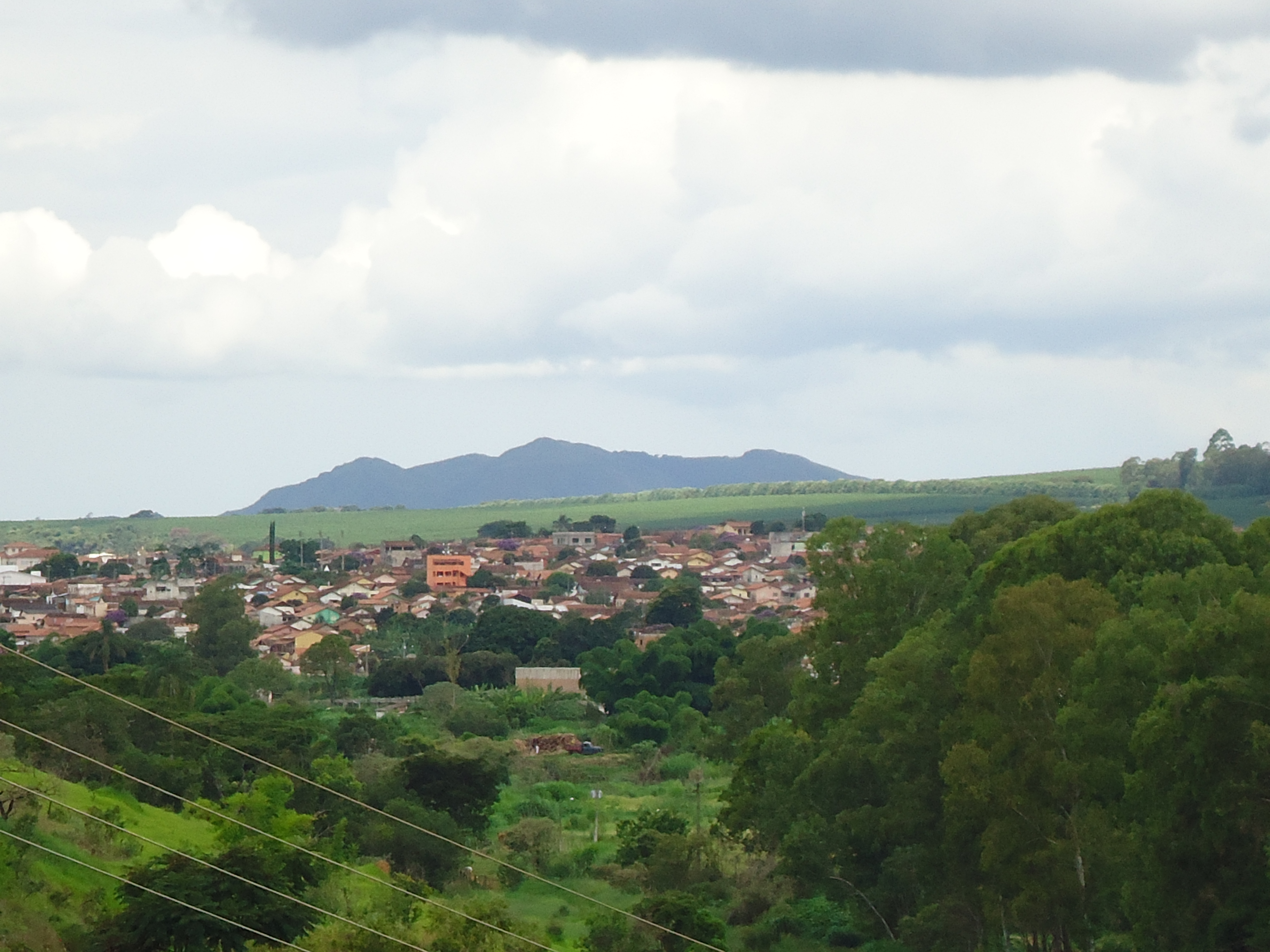
View of the mountain of Três Pontas with the shape that gave the city name.

The city takes its name from the peculiar shape of the mountain near the city; the three peaks were used as a reference point by ancient travelers and by runaway slaves. These slaves formed a settlement near the mountain, the Quilombo do Cascalho which was destroyed some time later.

== History ==
The first inhabitants of the region were runaway slaves who formed two quilombos, followed by colonisers moving from Europe. Although many explorers came looking for gold, the soil in the Três Pontas area has no gold or important mineral resources, so farms were formed to create cattle and grow crops.

The chapel of Nossa Senhora d'Ajuda was founded on October 15, 1768, by the Captain Bento Ferreira de Brito. This event is held to be the founding of Três Pontas itself as a permanent settlement - mixing rural and urban characteristics, slowly forming around the chapel. The locality was formally recognised as a village in April 1841.

City status was conferred upon the village on July 3, 1857. With the emergence of trade in coffee in the mid-19th century, and with the creation of roads, crops from Três Pontas reached the international market through Rio de Janeiro and São Paulo ports. Coffee has maintained the economy of the city ever since.

Três Pontas also had a rail spur, the Trespontana Railroad, which was inaugurated in 1895. The railway was closed in 1964 due to, among other reasons, the flooding of part of the line by the Furnas Dam. The rail terminal site was redeveloped into the City Hall.

== Geography ==
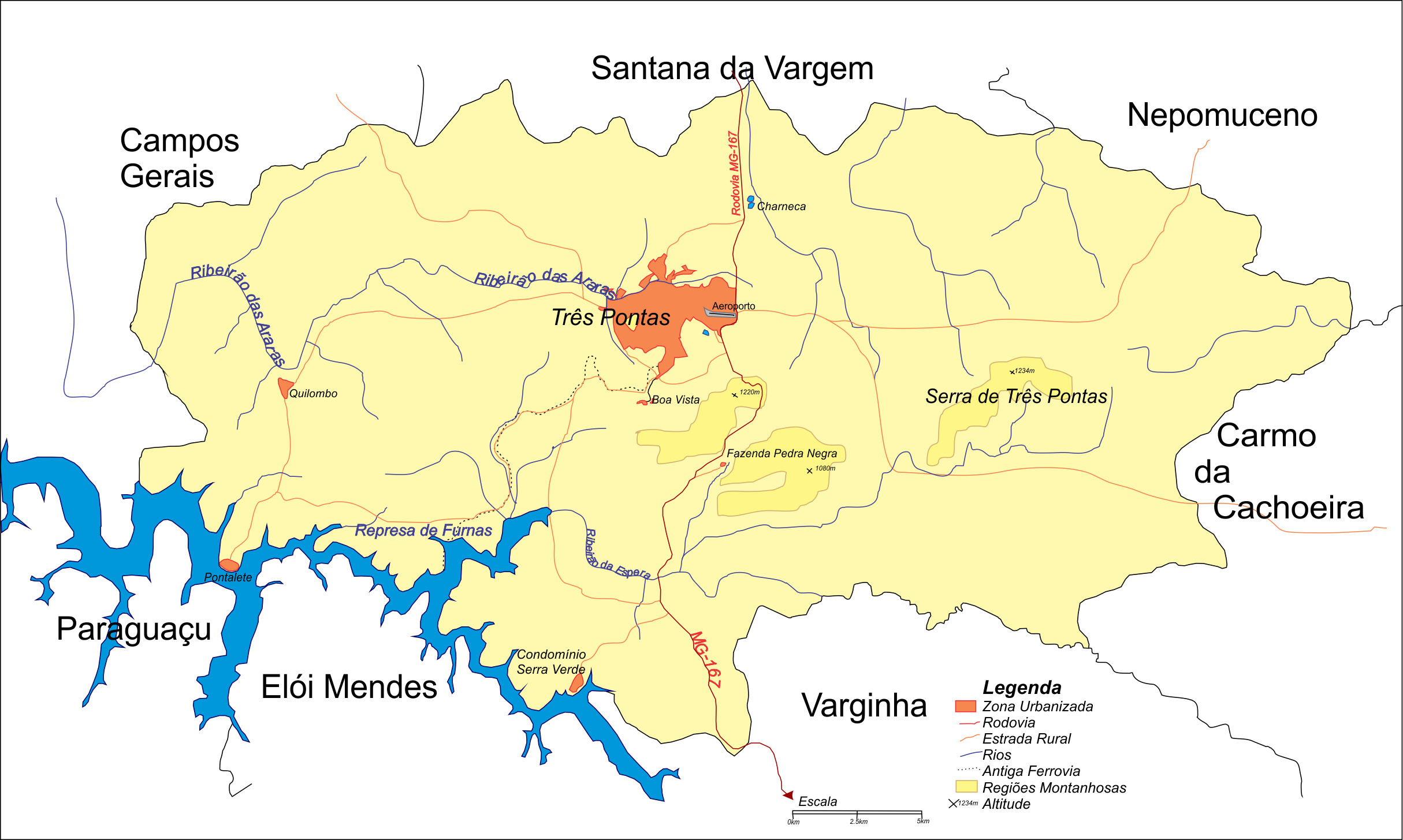
Map of Três Pontas showing its main geographic features.

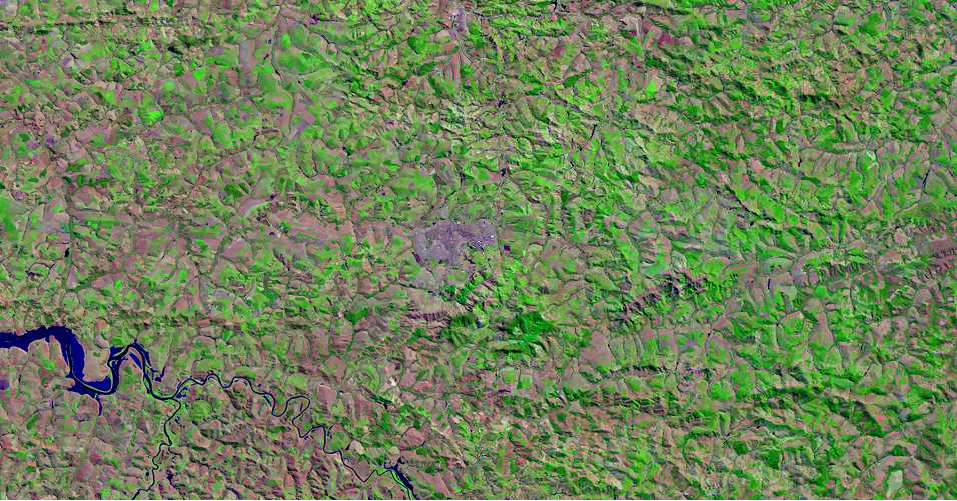
The Municipality photographed by a satellite. The grey spot in the center is the urban area.

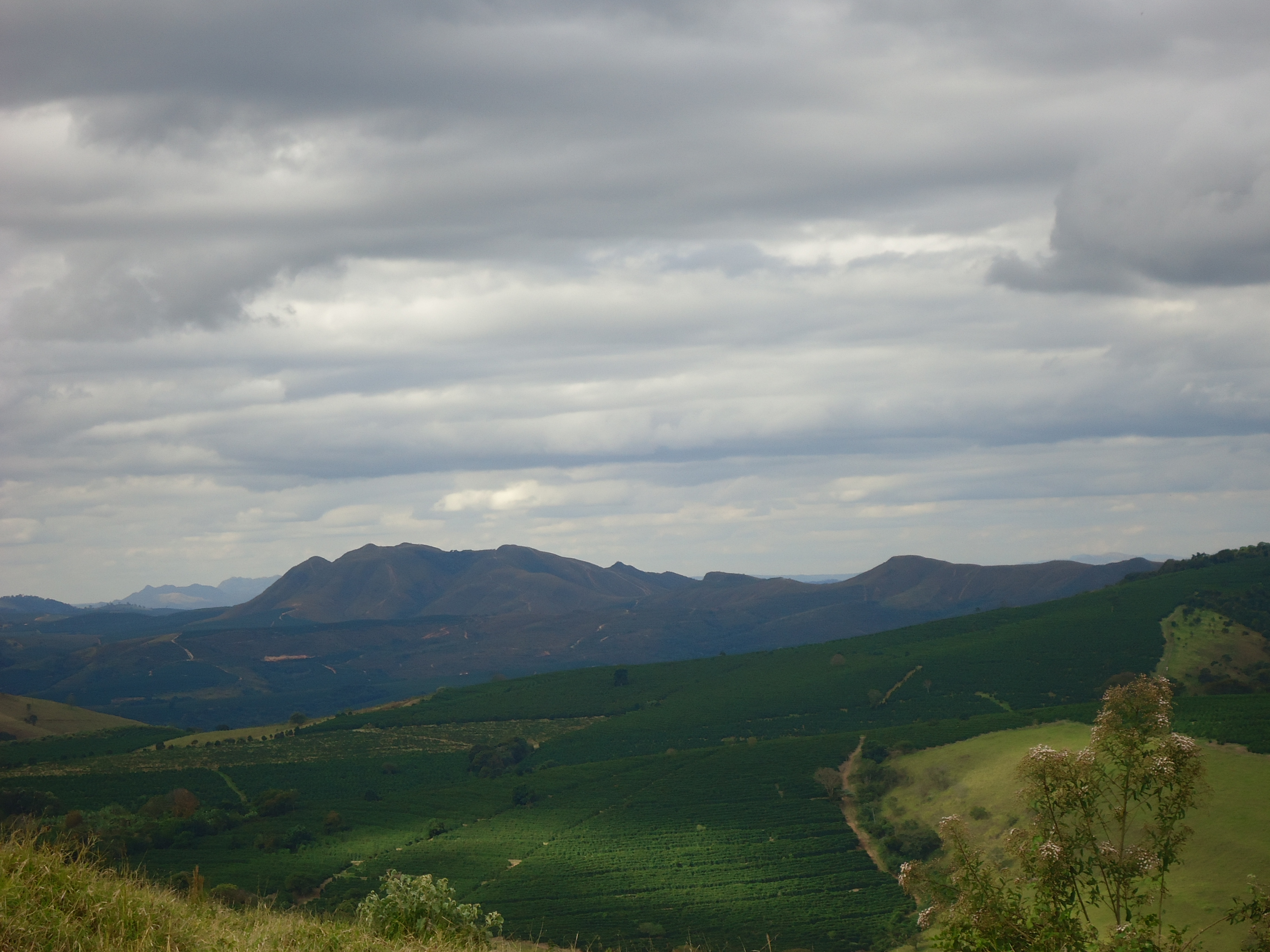
The Serra de Três Pontas, the highest mountain on the municipality.

The municipality is bordered to the north with Campos Gerais and Santana da Vargem, to the south by the municipalities of Varginha, Elói Mendes and Paraguaçu, to the east by Nepomuceno and Carmo da Cachoeira, and to the west by Campos Gerais.

Três Pontas is about 290 kilometres (180 miles) away from Belo Horizonte, the state's capital. According to the map of urban hierarchy produced by the Brazilian Institute of Geography and Statistics, Três Pontas is classified as a B zone center, which means the city has a restricted influence, only over the smaller cities around it; the Institute says that Três Pontas is under the influence of Varginha, and in turn of Belo Horizonte.

=== Relief, soils and rocks ===
The municipality has a wavy relief, with altitudes between 800 and 900 metres (2,600 and 3,000 ft) above sea level, with the city located at about 905 metres (2,969 ft). However about twenty percent of the municipality is in mountainous regions, in which the height exceeds 1,000 metres (3,300 ft) above sea level. One of these areas is the Serra de Três Pontas (Three Tips Hill), located nineteen kilometers away from the city, where is located the highest point of the municipality, at 1,234 metres (4,049 ft) meters above sea level. The lowest point is located on the margins of the Furnas reservoir, at about 770 metres (2,530 ft) above the sea level.

==== Soils ====
Soils in the area are mostly red/yellow oxisols. According to the Brazilian Systems of Soils Classification all (or almost all) oxisols are acidic and nutrient-poor; when adjusted and fertilized these soils become highly productive.

==== Rocks ====
According to the Geologic Map of Minas Gerais, the soils in the south portion of the municipality have kyanite granulite rocks. In the north, it has rocks of the ortogneissics complexes (ortogneisses granitics, granulite, migmatite and anphibolite). In the region of Três Pontas Mountain the rocks are formed by metapelitic graphitous alternated with quartzite.

=== Climate ===
The climate of Três Pontas is tropical semi-humid, with a dry season that lasts between four and five months and the average temperature is between 15 °C and 18 °C in at least one month in the year.

During the summer, rain usually comes in late afternoon, and temperatures at this time are very high. In the winter, the arrival of polar air masses causes temperatures to drop and frost to form; in this time of year, the relative humidity is low enough to cause discomfort to the population.

Climate data for Três Pontas
Month	Jan	Feb	Mar	Apr	May	Jun	Jul	Aug	Sep	Oct	Nov	Dec	Year
Mean daily maximum °C (°F)	31.2 (88.2)	33.5 (92.3)	30.3 (86.5)	27.4 (81.3)	25.9 (78.6)	23.5 (74.3)	25.1 (77.2)	28.8 (83.8)	32.3 (90.1)	31.5 (88.7)	29.5 (85.1)	29.4 (84.9)	29 (84)
Mean daily minimum °C (°F)	19 (66)	17.4 (63.3)	17.2 (63.0)	16.9 (62.4)	11.4 (52.5)	10.2 (50.4)	10.8 (51.4)	12.9 (55.2)	13.5 (56.3)	14.3 (57.7)	15.8 (60.4)	17.4 (63.3)	15.3 (59.5)
Average rainfall mm (inches)	321 (12.6)	98 (3.9)	293 (11.5)	49 (1.9)	25 (1.0)	41 (1.6)	0 (0)	12 (0.5)	0 (0)	139 (5.5)	178 (7.0)	192 (7.6)	1,331 (52.4)
Source: COCATREL Temperatures= "Temperatures in Três Pontas". COCATREL.

=== Hydrography ===
The municipality is watered by Verde and Sapucaí rivers (dammed in Furnas), belonging to the Rio Grande drainage basin. It also has the Araras and Espera streams, that are formed by the joining of several smaller streams. The Arara stream rises near the town and moves west to flow into the reservoir of the Furnas. The Espera stream rises near the Três Pontas Mountain and flows into the Furnas near a farm with the same name. Other streams that rise on the north of Três Pontas Mountain go north and flow into Rio Grande.

=== Biome ===
Três Pontas is in the transition area between the Mata Atlântica biome and the Cerrado biome. The original vegetation of the municipality was heavily wooded, though most of the trees have been cleared to allow coffee production.

== Urban area ==
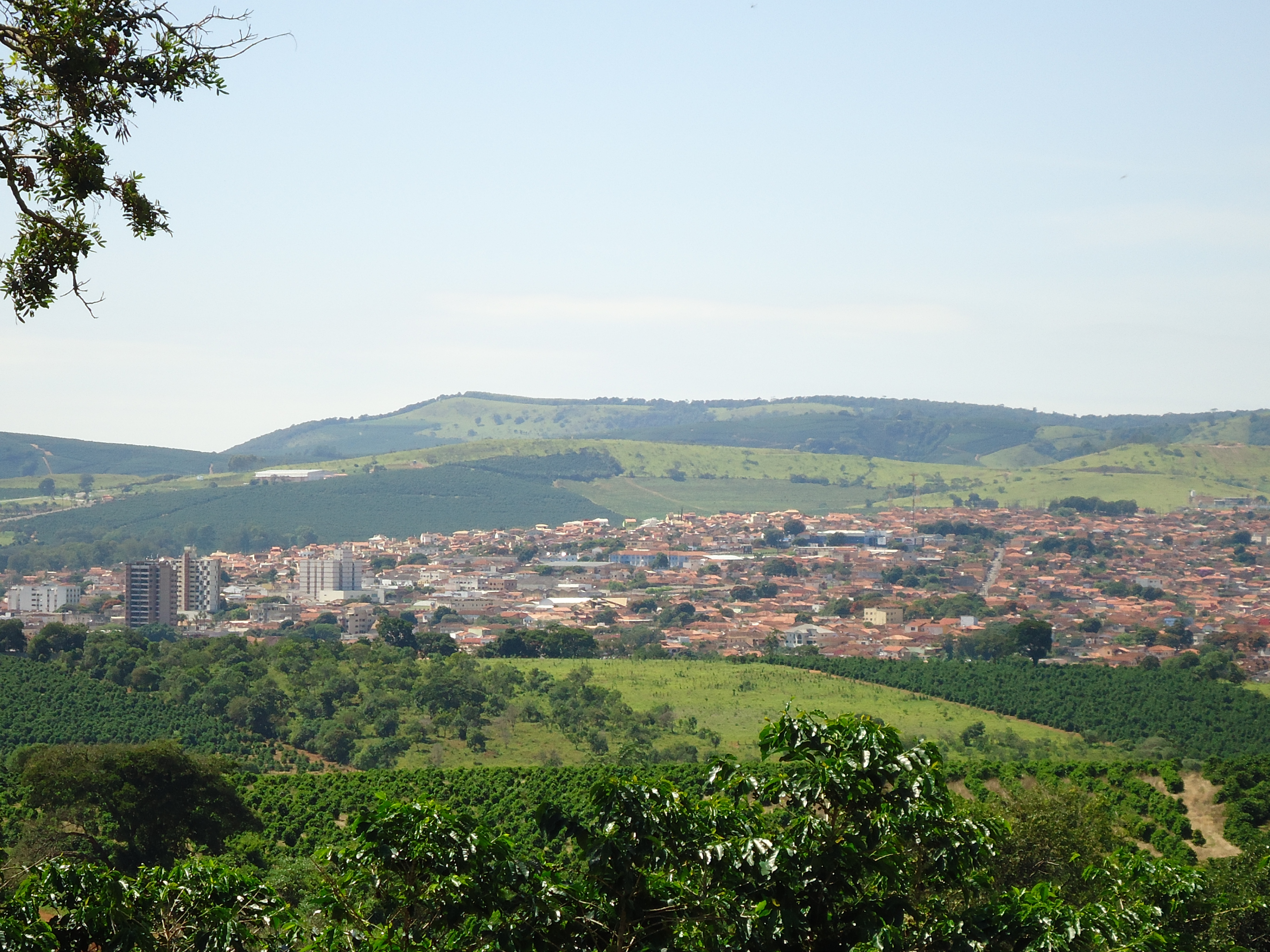
View of Três Pontas

The water and sewage service is by S.A.A.E. (Serviço Autônomo de Água e Esgoto, Water and Sewage Autonomous System). Três Pontas has 12,644 water connections, which means that 100% of urban area homes served with treated water. The sewage system serves 12,572 homes; with 99.2% of houses having access to the sewage system, the city is among the places with better sanitation in Brazil.

In the municipality, 14,004 homes have water connections, 1,776 draw water from wells or springs on their own property and 263 have other forms of obtaining water.

Electrical power is supplied by CEMIG (Compania Energética de Minas Gerais, or Energetic Company of Minas Gerais).

Três Pontas has about 98% of paved streets in the urban area. Due to an increasing number of vehicles, there is a lack of parking lots in downtown; in peak hours, the traffic becomes slow in some streets.

The city has bus lines that serve almost all neighborhoods of the urban area.

According to the 2010 census, there are 18,517 houses in the municipality, that total 21,819 addresses. 3,474 addresses are in the countryside and 18,345 in the urban area. The census also found that 15,474 homes are houses (96.5%), 526 are apartments (3.3%) and 40 belong to a condominium (0.2%).

== Transport ==
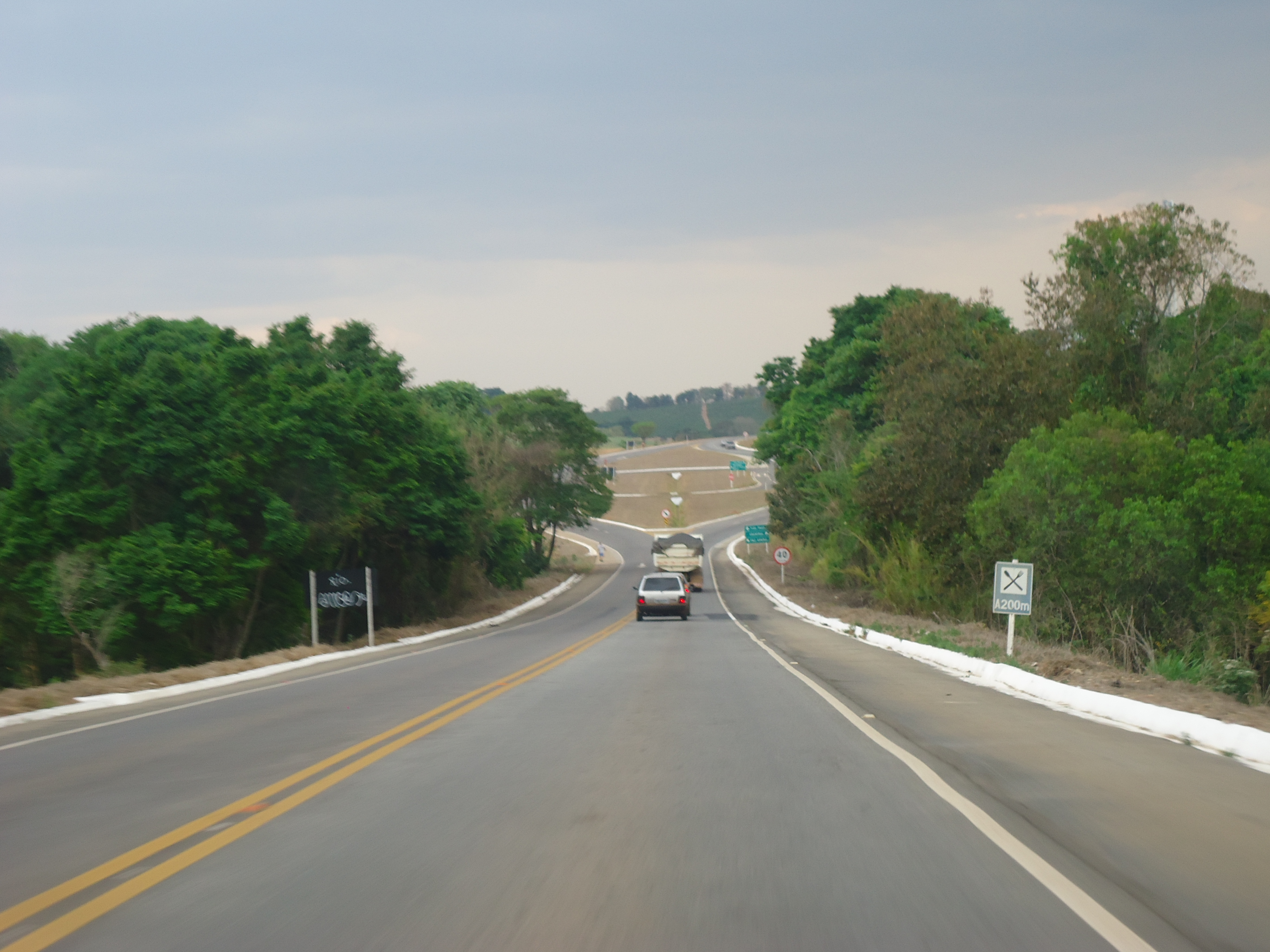
Road MG-167 between Três Pontas and Santana da Vargem near Charneca.

Três Pontas is crossed by the state highway MG-167 giving access to BR-491 (passing through Varginha) and BR-265 (passing through Santana da Vargem). Both federal highways give access to Rodovia Fernão Dias (BR-381).

The municipality is crossed by more than 300 kilometres (190 mi) of rural roads, mostly in good condition. Through these routes it is possible to get directly to Campos Gerais, Nepomuceno, Carmo da Cachoeira and Paraguaçu (passing through Pontalete crossing the Furnas Dam by a ferry line)

There are proposals to create a road from Três Pontas to Paraguaçu passing through Pontalete; and another for a road from Três Pontas to Carmo da Cachoeira.

The city has the Leda Mello Resende Airport, 3 kilometers from the downtown, with a paved runway, measuring 1150m in length by 20m in width, which allows for the landing and takeoff of small and medium-sized planes.

It is possible to arrive to the Pontalete district by boat, because the district is watered by the Furnas Dam.

== Population ==
According to the 2010 census, 27,155 (50.4%) of Três Pontas population are women, and 26,705 (49.6%) are men.

The census also researched inhabitants' skin color.

Skin color	Number of people	Percentage
White	26,754	49.7%
Black	5554	10.3%
Yellow	305	0.6%
Brown	21,220	39.4%

- Municipal Human Development Index: .773
- State ranking: 152 out of 853 municipalities
- National ranking: 1251 out of 5138 municipalities
- Life expectancy: 72
- Literacy rate: 88%

== Economy ==
The municipal economy is mixed, with coffee being the most important economic product.

=== Agriculture ===
Coffee is the predominant crop in Três Pontas, occupying the majority of the cultivated land. The municipality has over 30 million coffee trees spread across approximately 24,000 hectares (59,000 acres), making it the largest coffee-producing municipality in Brazil. About 75% of its coffee production is sold through the Coffee Growers' Cooperative of the Três Pontas Region.

Other crops cultivated in the region include corn, beans, and various vegetables. In 2010, the city produced 29,808 tons of coffee, equivalent to around 1% of Brazil's national output, with an average yield of 1,440 kg per hectare, generating a total revenue of R$ 157,982,000.

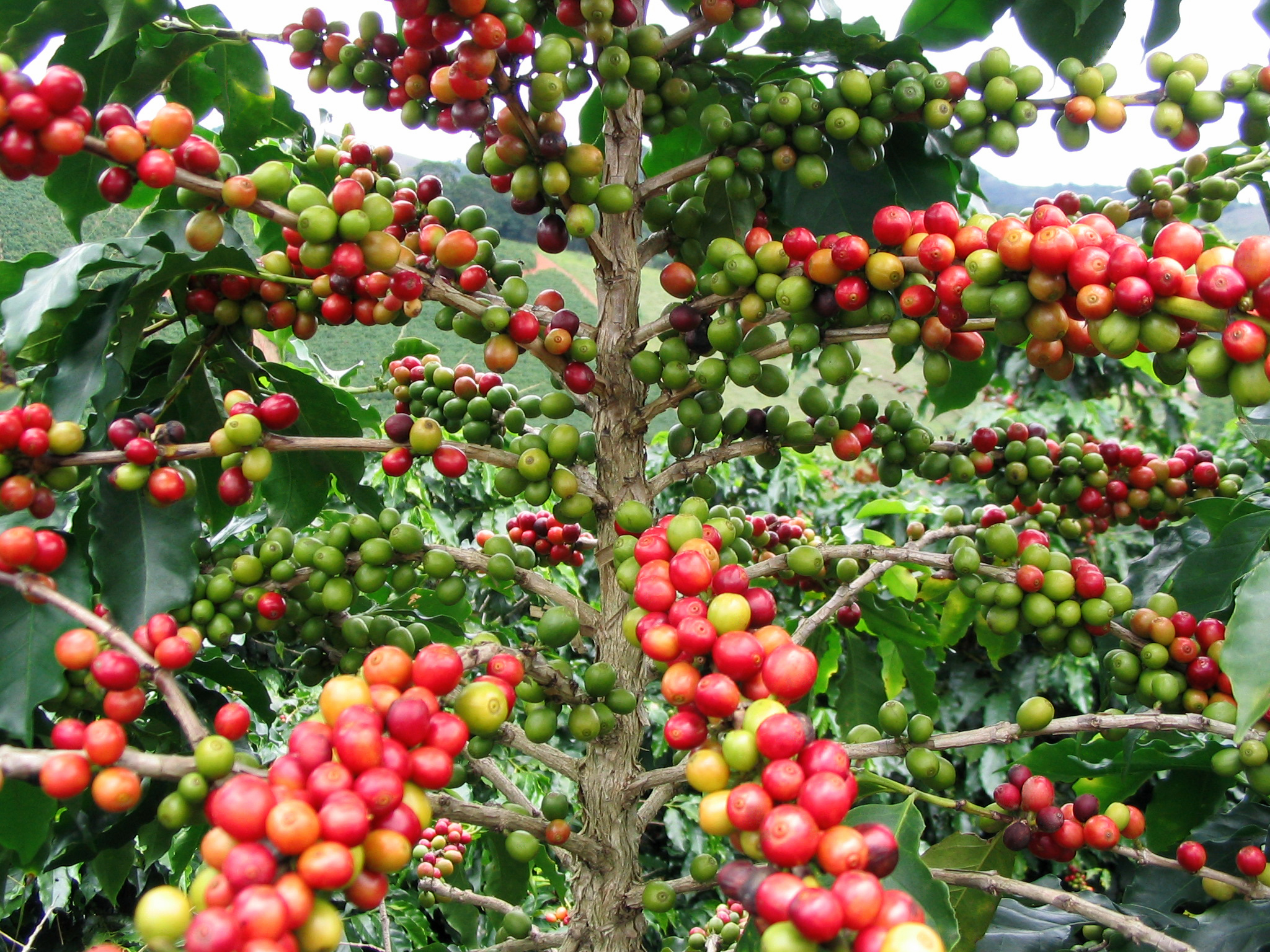
coffee is the main product of the city economy.

==== Permanent farming ====
Year	Banana	Coffee	Guava	Orange	Passion fruit	Tangerine
1990	26	24032	-	6630	-	1740
2000	3	35904	-	5538	-	702
2010	40	29808	4	108	10	126
Production value (R$)
2000	13000	42474000	-	223	-	49
2010	22	157982000	6	52	6	40

Source: government statistics.

==== Temporary Farming ====
Product	Production Value (R$) (2000).	Production value (R$)(2010)	Planted area (ha)(1990).	Planted area (ha)(2000)	Planted area (ha) (2010)
Rice	49 000	11000	603	200	8
Sugar cane	-	14000	6118	(sem dados)	10
Beans	502000	1764000	2400	1100	1200
Cassava	77000	90000	14	17	10
Corn	3125000	6300000	4000	4000	3500
Tomato	-	960000	-	-	12

==== Animal production ====
Year	Cows	Horses	Buffalo	Asinines	Hinnies	Swine	Goats	Sheep	Chickens
1974	26724	848	-	-	-	3124	22	91	40000
1980	20261	1500	-	-	350	6307	-	-	37826
1990	20500	1070	-	119	119	438	-	27	32000
2000	20000	1620	120	20	140	2110	50	20	6400
2009	21727	1790	262	80	185	1770	72	21	6120

Source: government statistics (Animal numbers).

=== Industry ===
Três Pontas has an Industrial Park, with small and medium industries, including fertilizers, agricultural machinery, fabrics, plastic ware, precast products, metalwork, furniture, roasting, baking, graphics, and still photography.

Tourism in the region is driven by the dam and farm hotels.

=== Services ===
The service sector contributes 62% of the municipality's revenue.

Commercial establishments by activity:

- Restaurants / Bars - 315
- Hotels and others - 6
- Coffee shops, Bakeries and Ice Cream – 78
- Gas stations with services - 12
- Markets – 152
- Obs.: Total number of registered taxpayers in the municipality in various brands of activity: 3938

== Public health ==
The municipality is responsible for about 58% of health facilities; the other 42% are private. The city has a Pronto Atendimento Municipal (Municipal Emergency Services), which attends to urgent and emergency cases. It also has the Hospital São Francisco de Assis (St. Francis Hospital), which has about 100 beds, along with surgical, obstetric, pediatric, ICU wards and a medical clinic. The hospital also offers radiology services, ultrasound and a sterilization center.

The Department of Health of Três Pontas manages various clinics scattered throughout neighborhoods.

- Center for Health Catumbi (Centro de Saúde Catumbi)
- Padre Victor Health Center (Centro de Saúde Padre Victor)
- Health Centre St. Edwirges (Centro de Saúde Santa Edwirges)
- Health Center Marilena Village (Centro de Saúde Vila Marilena)
- Center for Health Polyclinic (Centro de Saúde Policlínica)

There are also centers in rural communities and periodic visits.

The Municipal Pharmacy provides medications to low-income families.

The Municipal Health Department also carries out periodic preventive campaigns for public awareness about the prevention of various diseases, especially dengue.

Três Pontas has a Centre of Ophthalmology and a dental center, both with free care to low-income families.

There are also several private clinics in several areas of health.

According to the 2010 Census, there are 51 health facilities public and private in the city.

== Education ==
=== Elementary and high school ===
Most schools are under the responsibility of the Municipal Secretary of Education. The city has 14 municipal schools in the urban area (11 being day care centers and kindergarten schools, one from 1st to 3rd grade, one from 1st to 5th grade and one from 1st to 9th grade) and 7 in the rural zone (being 6 from 1st to 5th grade and 1 kindergarten).

The city has four state schools (that have students from 6th to 9th grade and high school) and four private schools (that have students from kindergarten to high school).

=== Higher education ===
Três Pontas is home to the Centro Universitário do Sul de Minas (University Center of South Minas).

=== Professional education ===
Três Pontas has many schools with professional courses to serve young people wishing to enter the labor market. A professional school of the SEST/SENAT is also being built.

According to the 2010 census, there are 34 schools in Três Pontas.

== Culture ==
Celso Brant Public Library is administrated by the Culture, Leisure and Tourism Secretary. The library has more than 20,000 books and was opened in 1959.

Heitor Vila Lobos Municipal Music School teaches many musical instruments and was established in 1987.

The city's main theater is the Milton Nascimento Cultural Center.

== Sports and tourism ==
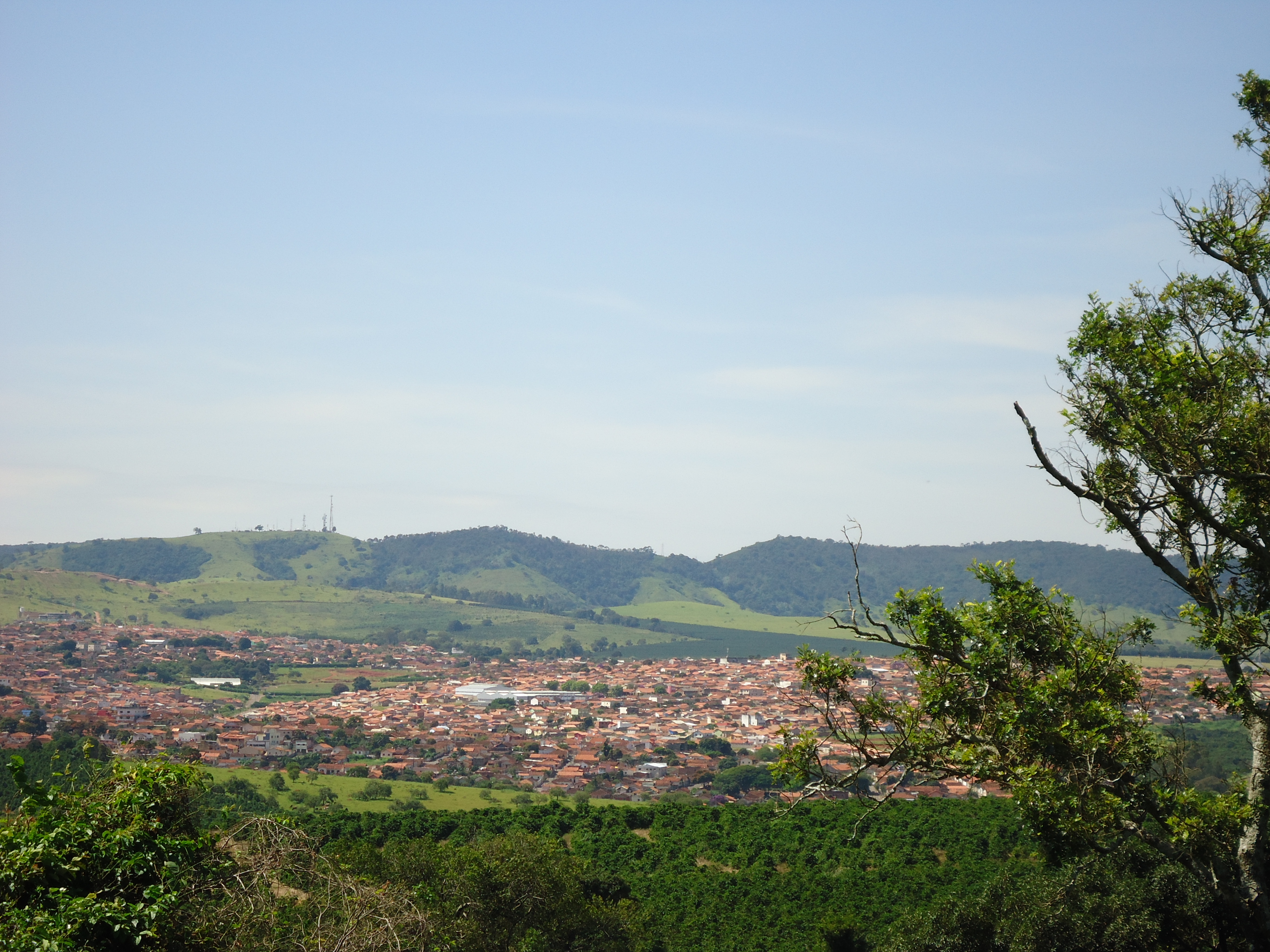
View of mountains near Três Pontas. The Hotel Farm Pedra Negra is among these mountains, being a tourist destination.

Football matches are played at Ítalo Tomagnini Municipal Stadium, with football fields in many neighborhoods. Other sports, like futsal and volleyball, are played at the Gymnasium Aureliano Chaves.

The Sports Municipal Secretary arranges several events to promote sports in the city. Among these are karate classes, football, and volleyball for children and teenagers.

There are also many championships among teams from schools and neighborhoods.

The most popular tourist destination in Três Pontas is the Pontalete District, because of the Furnas Dam.

Other attractions include the Três Pontas Mountain, about 19 kilometers from the city. On the mountain there are many trails, some waterfalls and a wall made by slaves.

A Coffee Museum, showing the coffee culture, lies on the road between Três Pontas and Varginha.

== Religion ==
The dominant religion is Roman Catholicism.

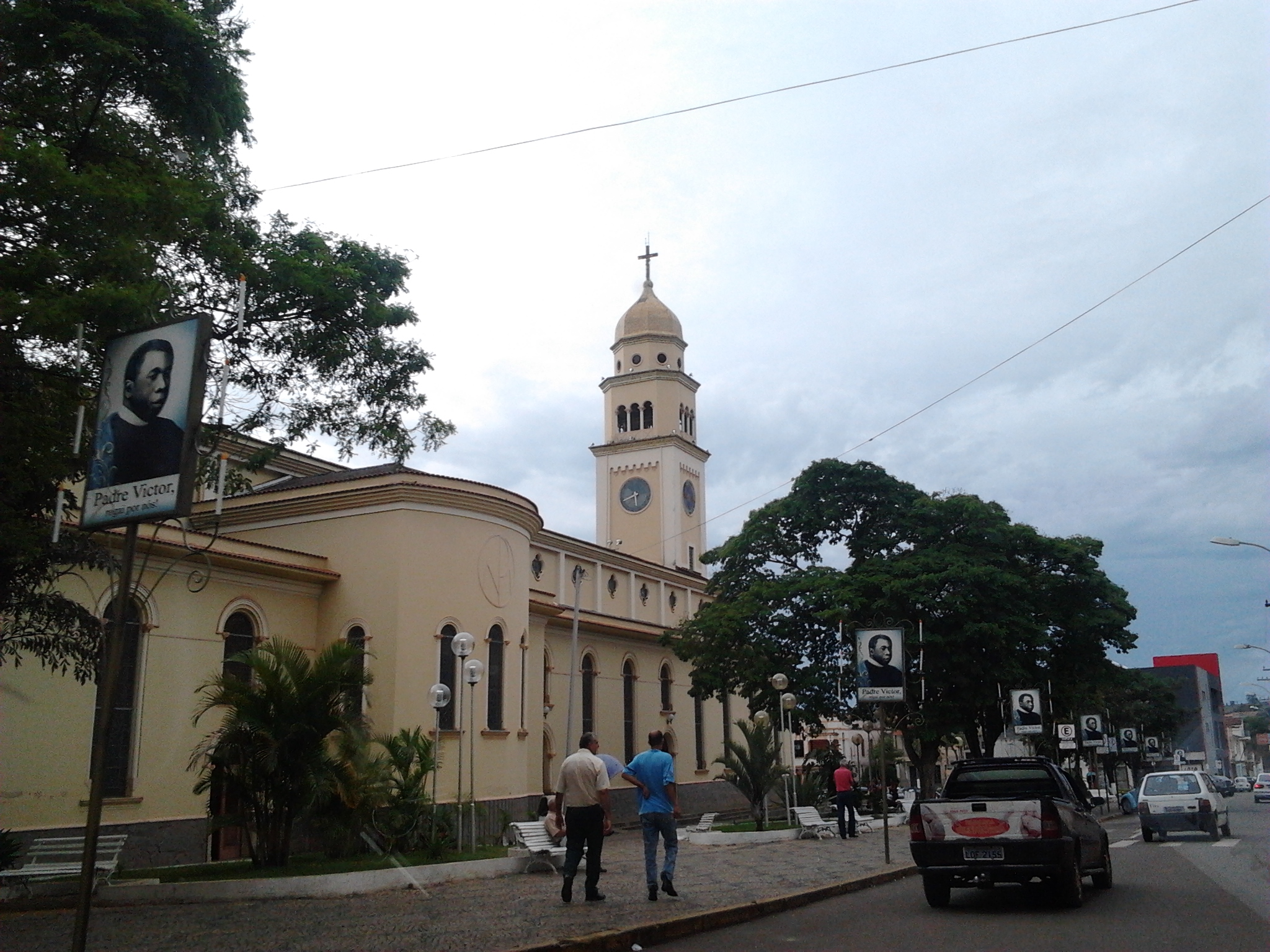
Church Nossa Senhora d'Ajuda.

The city has three parishes

- Parish Nossa Senhora d'Ajuda (Our Lady of Help) . The main church is the Matriz Nossa Senhora d'Ajuda Church, in downtown Três Pontas; the building houses the remains of Padre Victor.
- Parish Nossa Senhora Aparecida (Our Lady of Aparecida). The main church is the Aparecida Church
- Parish Cristo Redentor. The main church is the Nossa Senhora das Graças (Our Lady of Graces) Church (known as Catumbi Church).

The three parishes belong to the Diocese of Campanha.

=== Blessed persons ===
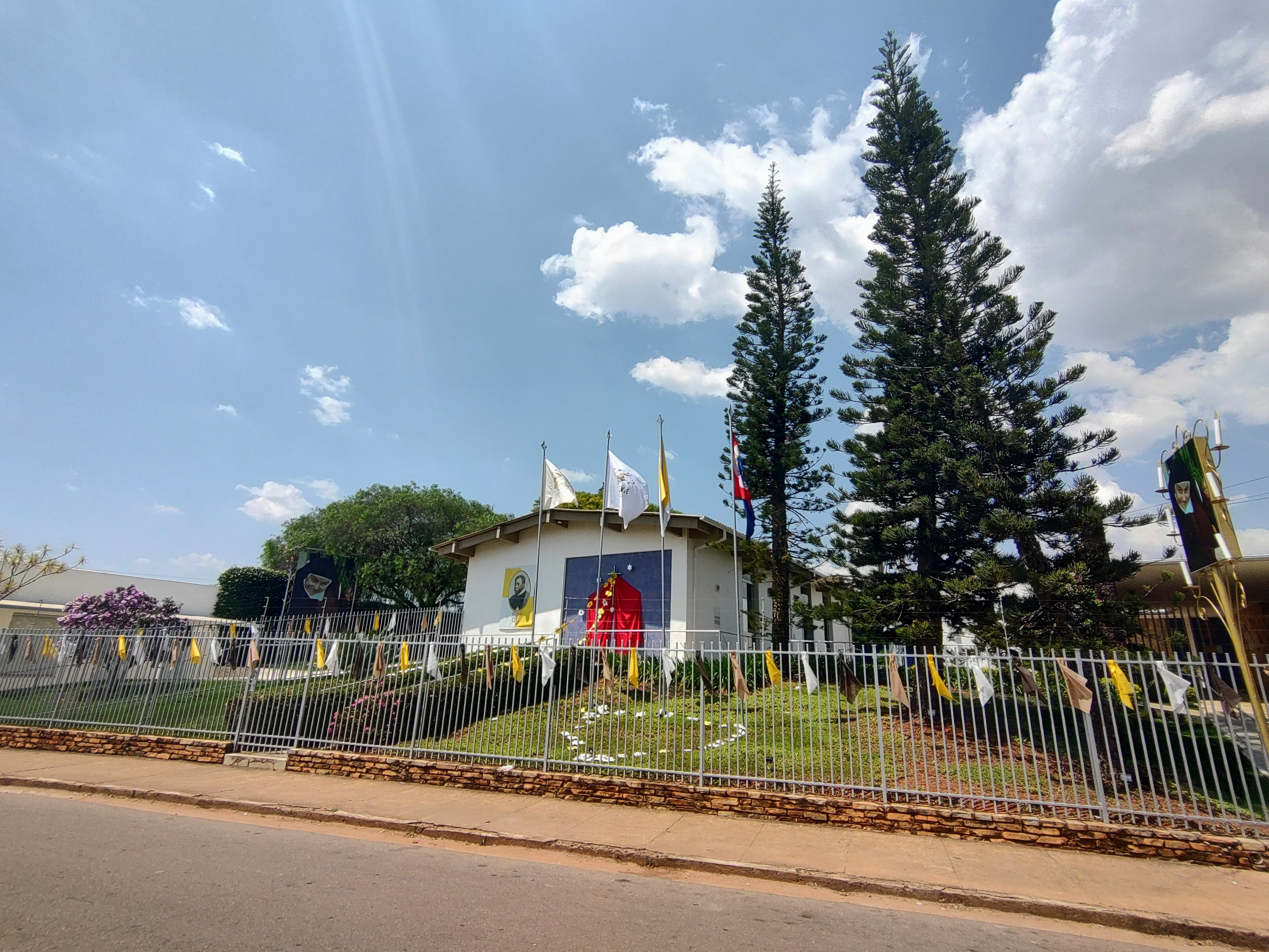
St. Joseph Carmel located in the Santa Inês neighborhood founded by the venerable "Nossa Mãe".

The Carmelite nun Tereza Margarida of the Heart of Mary founded a contemplative monastery in Três Pontas.

== Communications ==
Four radio stations broadcast in the Três Pontas area.

- Sentinela FM - 99.9 MHz
- Community Radio Liberdade FM - 87.9 MHz
- Radio Três Pontas - AM 1540 kHz
- Transamérica Hits - Fm 92.5 MHz

There is one newspaper headquartered in the city, Jornal Correio Trespontano (Trespontano Mail Newspaper).

== Events ==
The city's anniversary is celebrated on July 3, with shows and parties.

Expocafé occurs in June. This is one of the biggest events of the coffee growing country.

== See also ==
- List of municipalities in Minas Gerais
