= MG-167 (Minas Gerais highway) =

Highway in Minas Gerais, Brazil

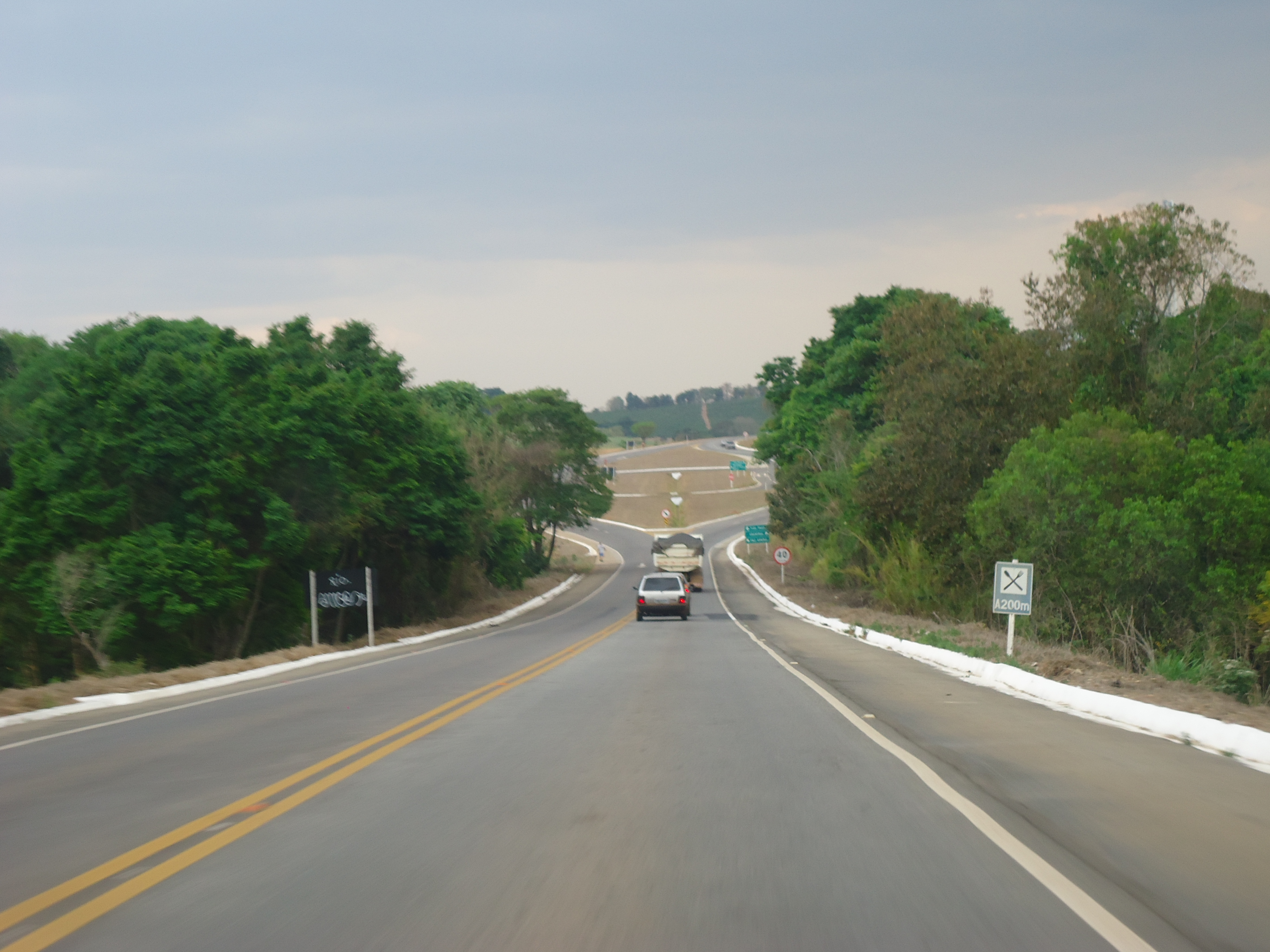
The road between Três Pontas and Santana da Vargem.

MG-167 is a Brazilian road located on southern Minas Gerais state. It is 96.6 km long and is all paved. The road starts at the junction with the road BR-265, on Santana da Vargem and ends at a junction with the road BR-267 in Cambuquira, passing through the municipalities of Três Pontas, Varginha and Três Corações.

== Tourism ==
The road belongs to a tourist circuit named Vale Verde e Quedas d'Água (Green Valleys and Waterfalls) that has 10 municipalities.
