= Borda da Mata =

- Municipality
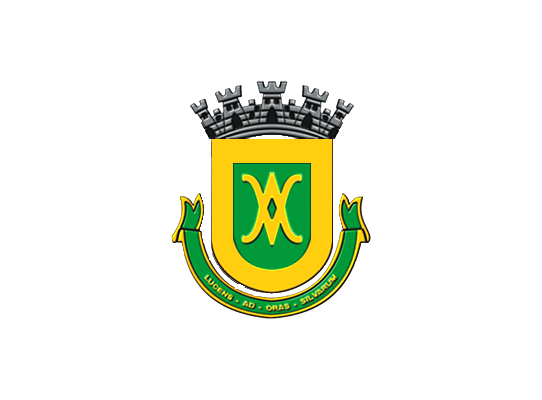
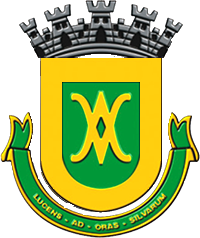
- Flag Coat of arms

- Location in Brazil
- Coordinates: 22°16′26″S 46°09′54″W
- Country: Brazil
- Region: Southeast
- State: Minas Gerais
- Mesoregion: South and Southwest of Minas Gerais
- Microregion: Pouso Alegre
- Founded: November 24th, 1924

Government
  - Mayor: Edmundo Silva Junior

Area
  - Total: 116,258 sq mi (301,108 km^{2})
- Elevation: 2,635 ft (803 m)

Population (2020)
  - Total: 19,614
- Time zone: UTC−3 (BRT)
- HDI (2010): 0.730
- Website: bordadamata.mg.gov.br

Borda da Mata is a municipality in Minas Gerais, Brazil.

== Personalities ==
The carmelite nun Tereza Margarida do Coração de Maria was born there.

== See also ==
- List of municipalities in Minas Gerais
