= Tereza Margarida of the Heart of Mary =

Brazilian Discalced Carmelite

Venerable Tereza Margarida of the Heart of Mary OCD
- Born: 24 December 1915; Borda da Mata, Brazil
- Died: 14 November 2005 (aged 89); Três Pontas, Brazil

Tereza Margarida of the Heart of Mary OCD (born Maria Luiza Rezende Marques; 24 December 1915 – 14 November 2005), was a Brazilian Discalced Carmelite from the state of Minas Gerais. She was known as nossa mãe ("our mother") by virtue of her welcome, prayers and advice to those who sought her. Pope Francis recognized her heroic virtue in May 2023. The preparations for her beatification process began in July 2011.

== Life ==
Maria Luiza Rezende Marques was born on 24 December, 1915, in Borda da Mata. She was the fifth of twelve children of the couple Francisco Marques da Costa Júnior and Mariana Resende Costa. Her parents, concerned about her education and that of her siblings, moved to Cruzeiro, in São Paulo. In Taubaté, she studied at the school of the Sisters of the Congregation of Saint Joseph of Chambéry.

In her youth, Maria Luiza began reading the book The Story of a Soul by Therese of Lisieux and the Memoirs of Elizabeth of the Trinity. From then on, she felt drawn to Carmelite spirituality. Overcoming her father's resistance, she entered the Carmelite convent in Mogi das Cruzes as a postulant in 1937, taking the religious name Tereza Margarida of the Heart of Mary. On 2 February, 1939, Tereza made her first temporary vows and, on February 2, 1942, she made her solemn vows. In 1946, the convent of Mogi made a new foundation in Aparecida, and Tereza Margarida of the Heart of Mary was sent with them.

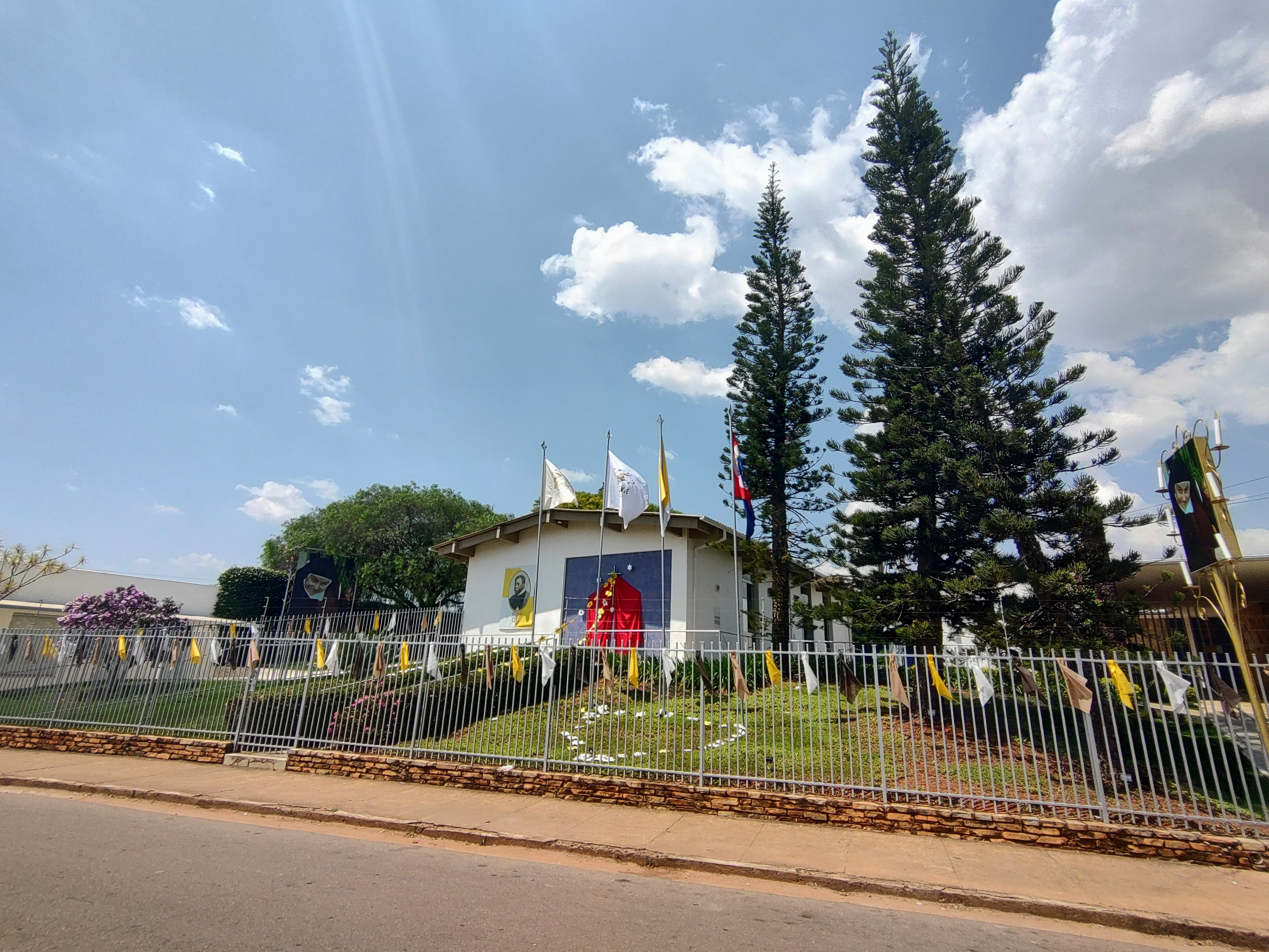
The Carmel of Três Pontas

At the request of the Bishop of Campanha, Tereza Margarida, along with seven sisters, on July 16, 1962, founded a new convent in Três Pontas. There she fulfilled the duties of a subprioress, prioress, and mistress of novices. Quickly, the newly founded Carmelite monastery became a destination for many faithful from the region who sought her wise counsel, spiritual direction, and other forms of help. These pilgrims called her "Our Mother" as a form of affection and admiration.

As she aged, Tereza Margarida's health began to decline, however, she continued to listen to the numerous faithful who sought her out. Her life came to In the early morning of November 14, 2005, when she was 89 years old, she died in the infirmary of the Carmelite convent in Três Pontas.

== Beatification ==
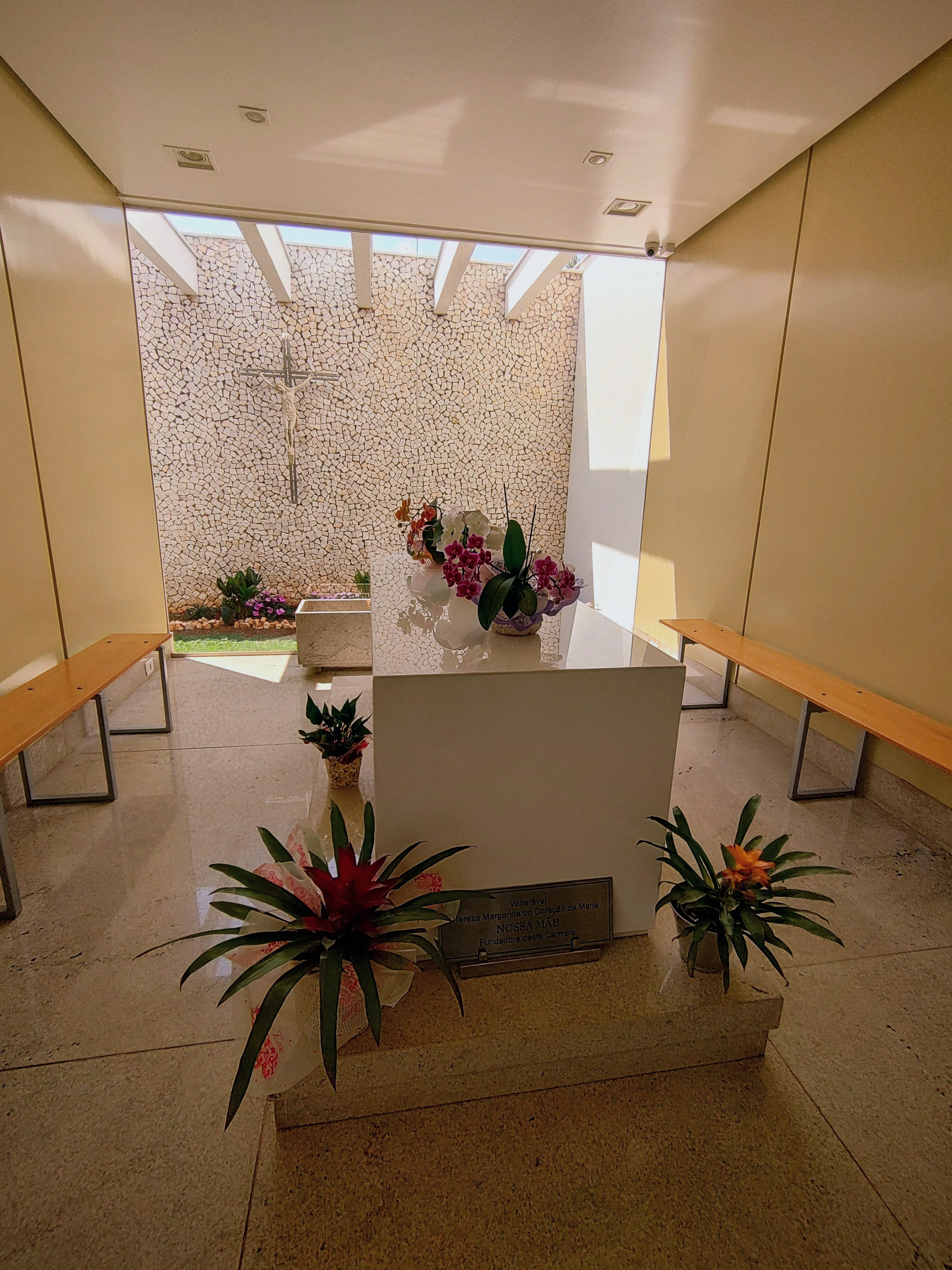
Tomb of Tereza Margarida in the Carmel of Très Pontas

On July 7, 2011, after receiving the nihil obstat, the preparations for the beatification process began. On 4 March 2012 the diocesan phase of the process began, with the collection of testimonies on the legacy of Tereza Margarida of the Heart of Mary. The phase was completed on May 12 of the following year, and all the material on Teresa Margarida of Mary's legacy was sent to the Congregation for the Cause of Saints. On 20 May 2023, Pope Francis declared her venerable. The postulator of this cause is Paolo Vilotta.
