= Urban hierarchy in Brazil =

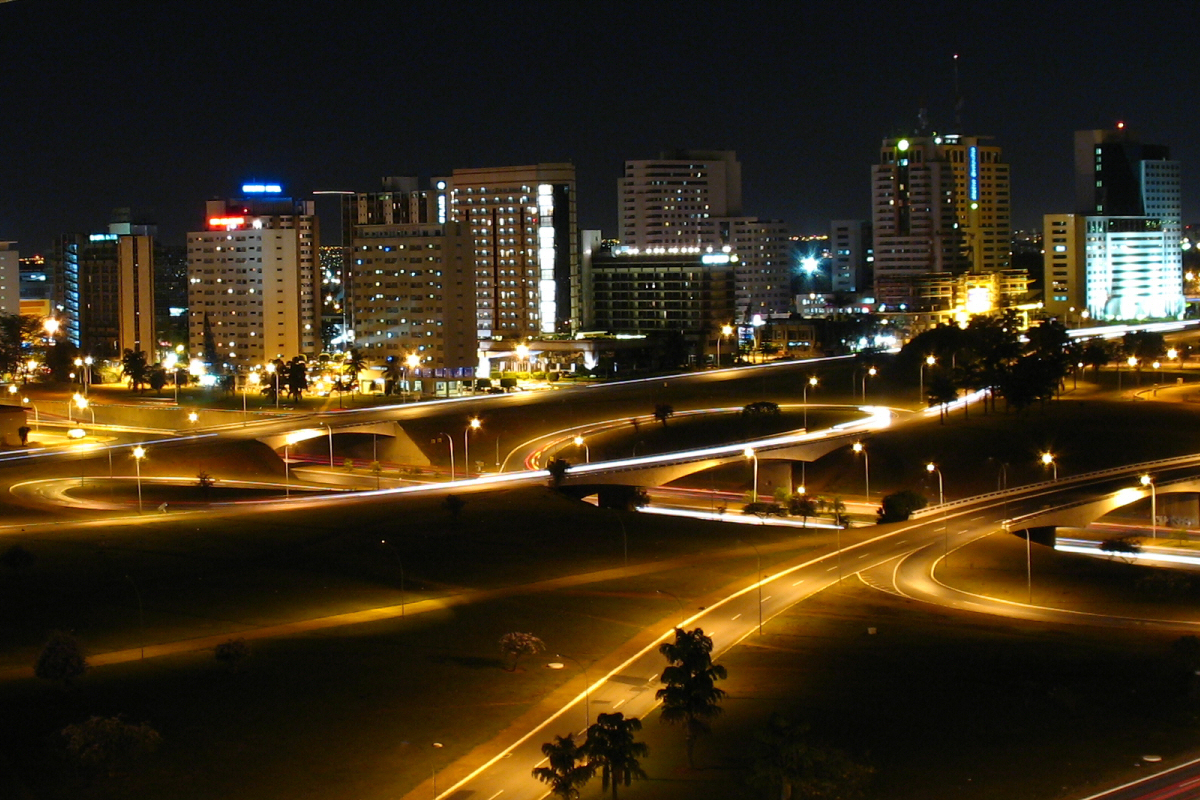
Brasília, a national metropolis.

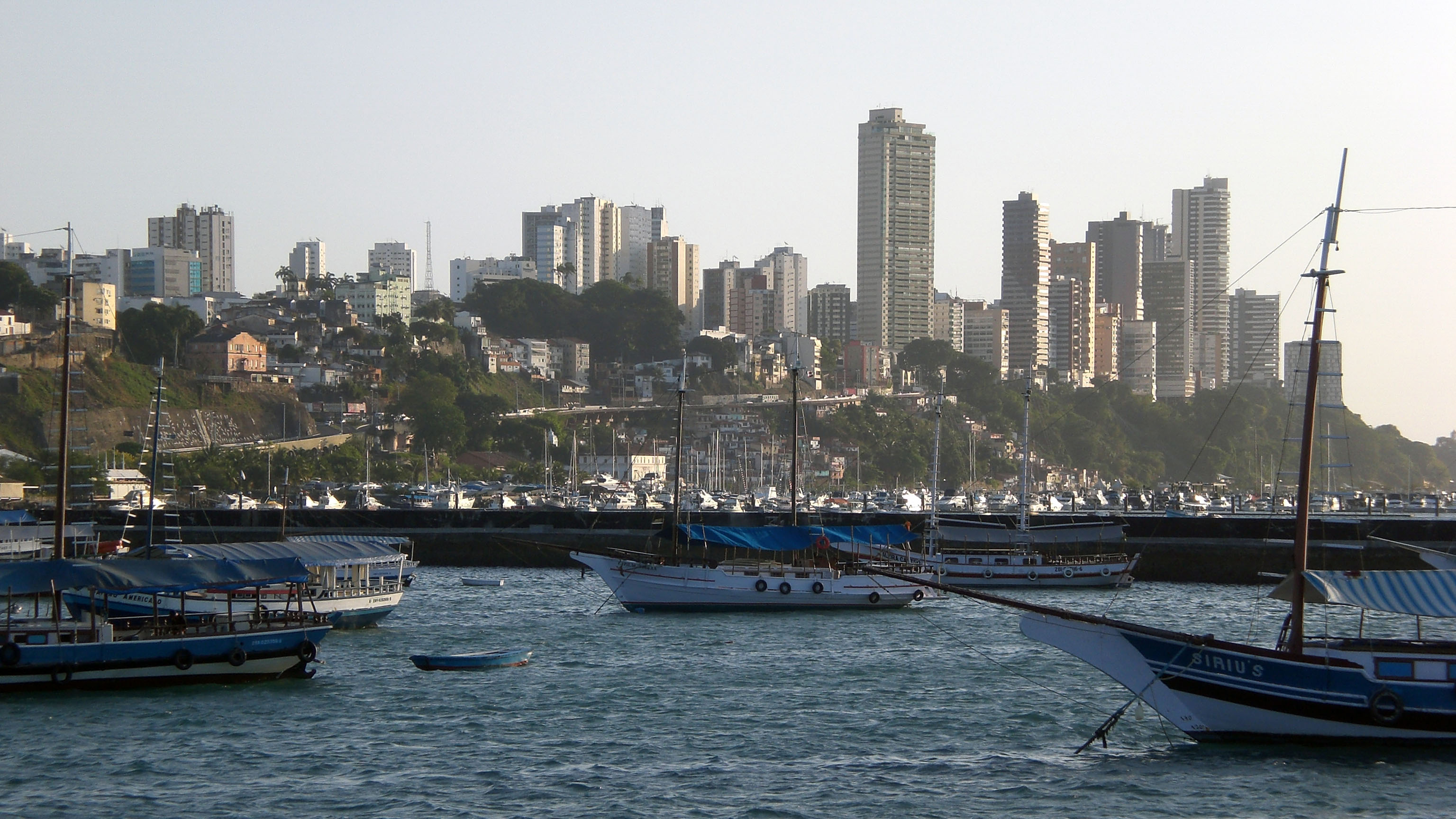
Salvador, a regional metropolis.

The urban hierarchy of Brazil places Brazil's cities into categories: global cities, national metropolises, regional metropolises, regional capitals (A, B and C), sub-regional centers (A and B) and zone centers (A, B and C).

== Urban hierarchy ==
=== Global cities ===
Brazil's global cities possess areas of influence that surpass the country's borders. Brazil's global cities are the municipalities of Rio de Janeiro and São Paulo.

=== National metropolises ===
Brasília, São Paulo and Rio de Janeiro are Brazil's national metropolises. They are the first level of territorial management, providing a focus for centers located in all parts of Brazil.

=== Regional metropolises ===
Regional metropolises constitute the second level of territorial management, and influence the surrounding macro-region where they are located. Brazil's regional metropolises include Curitiba, Salvador, Porto Alegre, Goiânia, Fortaleza, Recife, Manaus, Belém and Belo Horizonte.

=== Regional capitals ===
The regional capital is the third level of territorial management, and influences its state and its surrounding states. These are subdivided into: A regional capitals (cities such as Natal, Campinas, Florianópolis and Vitória); B regional capitals (cities such as Caxias do Sul, Chapecó, Porto Velho and Campina Grande) and C regional capitals (cities such as Campos, Caruaru, Governador Valadares and Mossoró).

=== Sub-regional centers ===
Sub-regional centers possess influence over cities that are within close proximity, and nearby towns and rural areas as well. These are subdivided into: A sub-regional centers (cities such as Alfenas, Anápolis, São Mateus and Umuarama) and B sub-regional centers (Afogados da Ingazeira, Cacoal, Caratinga and Tefé).

=== Zone centers ===
The zone centers are the cities or towns that have an important regional influence, but limited to the immediate surrounding area, and exercising elementary management functions. These are subdivided into two levels: A zone centers (cities such as Tabatinga, Lagoa Vermelha, Lins and Três de Maio) and B zone centers (towns such as Afonso Cláudio, Eirunepé, São Bento and Taió).

== See also ==
- Demography of Brazil
- Cities of Brazil

General:

- Urban hierarchy
- Urban studies and planning
- Urban geography
