= Campo do Meio =

Coordinates: 21.1069°S 45.83°W

- Municipality
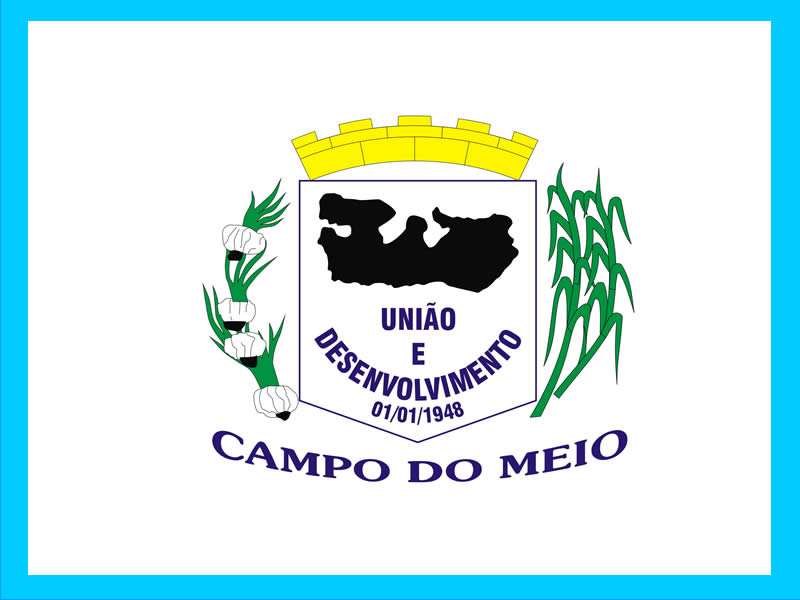
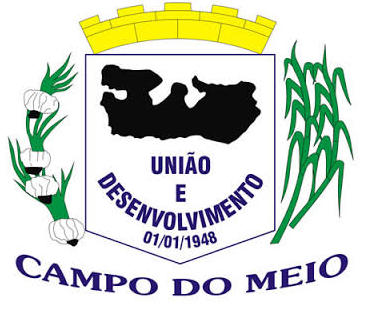
- Flag Coat of arms
- Interactive map of Campo do Meio
- Country: Brazil
- Region: Southeast
- State: Minas Gerais
- Mesoregion: Sul/Sudoeste de Minas

Population (2020)
  - Total: 11,651
- Time zone: UTC -3

Campo do Meio is a municipality in the state of Minas Gerais in the Southeast region of Brazil.

== See also ==
- List of municipalities in Minas Gerais
- City Hall page
