= Elói Mendes =

Brazilian municipality

Coordinates: 21°36′37″S 45°34′08″W

- Municipality
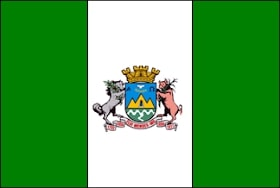
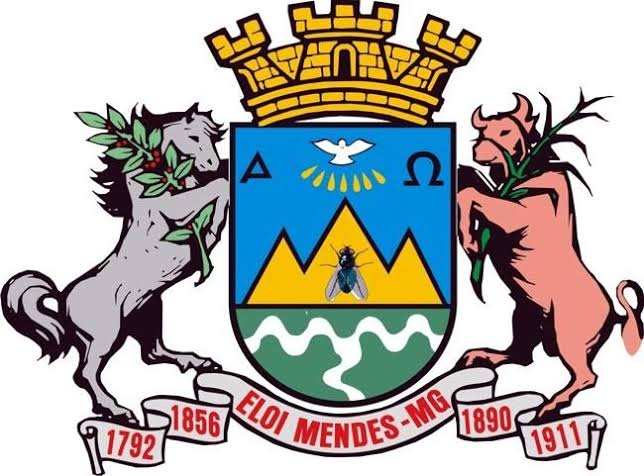
- Flag Coat of arms
- Interactive map of Elói Mendes
- Country: Brazil
- State: Minas Gerais
- Region: Southeast
- Time zone: UTC−3 (BRT)

Location of Elói Mendes in the state of Minas Gerais

Elói Mendes is a municipality in the south of the Brazilian state of Minas Gerais. In 2020 the population was 28,320 in a total area of 498 km^{2} (192 sq mi). The elevation of the municipal seat is 899 meters.

== Geography ==
Neighboring municipalities are Três Pontas, Paraguaçu, Cordislândia, Monsenhor Paulo and Varginha. The IBGE statistical microregion is Varginha. Elói Mendes lies on federal highway BR-491 and is between Varginha and Paraguaçu. The distance to Belo Horizonte is 335 km.

=== Climate and Temperatures ===
- Maximum elevation: 1,084 m - Cab. Córrego Pitangueira
- Minimum elevation: 793 m - Represa de Furnas
- Elevation of the city: 899,36 m
- Average annual temperature:19.6 °C
- Average annual minimum: 14.3 °C
- Average annual maximum: 26.9 °C
- Rainfall index: 1,592.7 mm

== Economy ==
The economy is based on agriculture and small and medium size industries. In agriculture the main crops are coffee, with 9,300 hectares planted in 2006, rice, sugarcane, beans and corn, with 3,200 hectares planted. In the industrial sector there are factories of cardboard tubes, furniture, mattresses, cement products, wires and thread, textiles, and magnetic cards. In 2007 there were 3 financial institutions.

=== Sectors of economic activity by workers ===
- Agriculture, fishing, and forestry: 3,900
- Industry: 1,687
- Commerce and merchandise: 1,379
- Other services: 3,007

TOTAL: 9,973

== History ==
The town traces its beginnings to the middle of the eighteenth century. Explorers arrived and camped on the banks of a small river. The climate was mild, there was abundant water, and the lands were fertile. But the site had one defect: it was infested by clouds of a blood-sucking mosquito called Mutuca. For this reason the river and the lands nearby were given the name "Mutuca".

1792 is the first date known in an authentic document referring to the existence of the town. The first settlement of Mutuca changed its name to Espírito Santo da Mutuca, later Espírito Santo do Pontal, and later reducing the name to Pontal. In 1911 it got its municipal emancipation from Varginha. The name, Pontal, was changed to Eloy Mendes in honor of Major Joaquim Eloy Mendes (1827–1913), who was an important local figure and a baron in the Empire of Brazil with the title of Baron of Varginha. Later with modern spelling the name was changed to Elói Mendes.

== Tourism ==
Elói Mendes is not far from the Rio Verde and the gigantic Furnas Reservoir, which is used for fishing, swimming, and boating. The annual carnival celebration attracts revelers from all over the south of Minas Gerais.

Municipal Human Development Index

- MHDI: .768
- State ranking: 181 out of 853 municipalities
- National ranking: 1,385 out of 5,138 municipalities
- Life expectancy: 72 years at birth
- Literacy rate: 85% For the complete list see Frigoletto

== See also ==
- List of municipalities in Minas Gerais
