= Fama, Minas Gerais =

Coordinates: 21°24′21″S 45°49′44″W

- Municipality
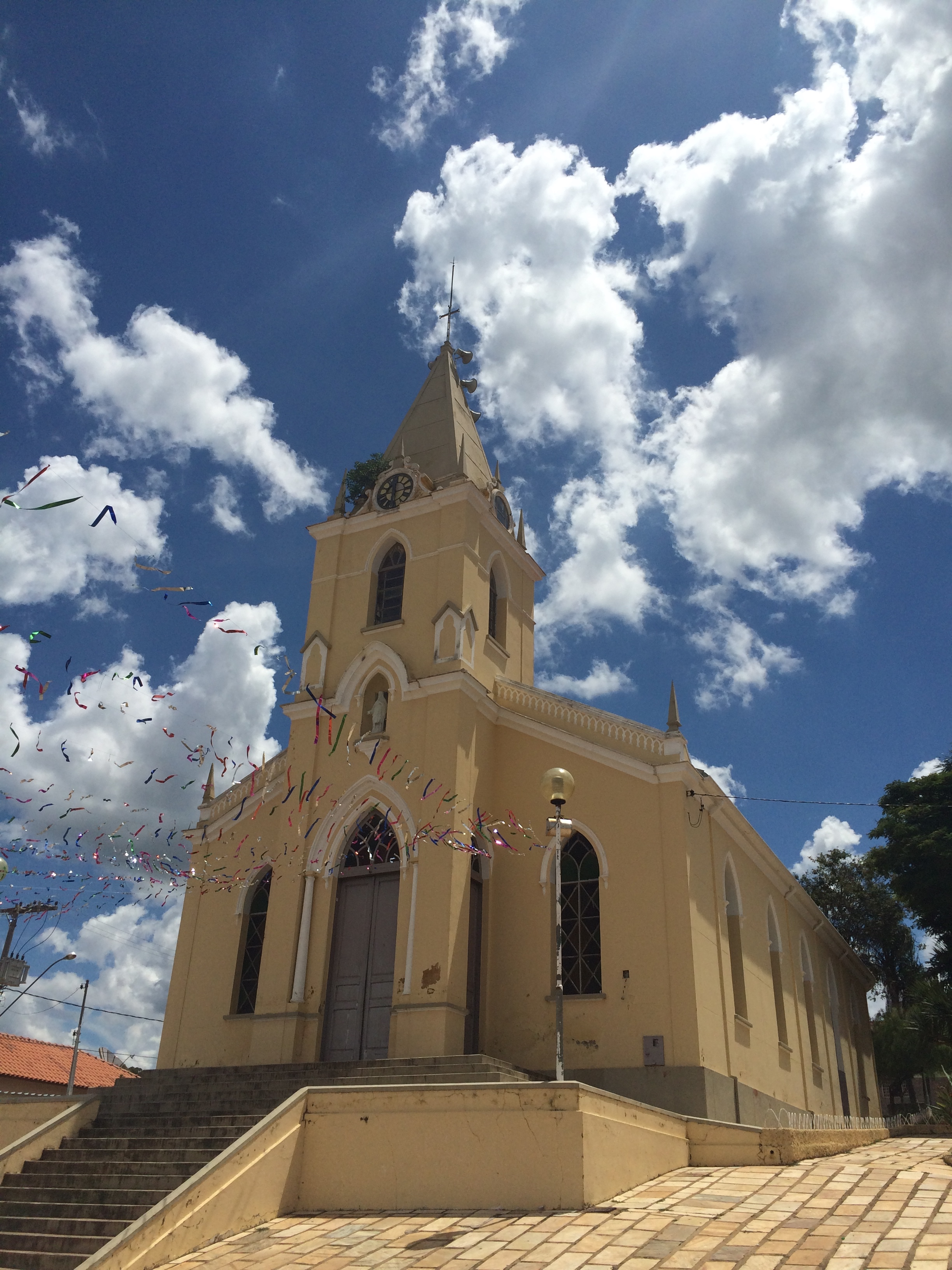

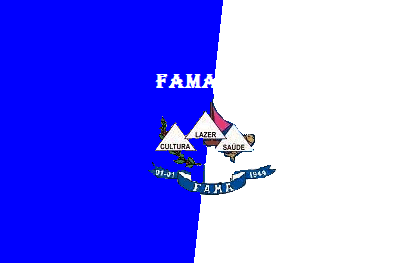
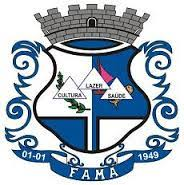
- Flag Coat of arms
- Interactive map of Fama, Minas Gerais
- Country: Brazil
- Region: Southeast
- State: Minas Gerais
- Mesoregion: Sud/Sudoeste de Minas

Government
  - Mayor: Osmair Leal dos Reis (PTB)

Population (2020)
  - Total: 2,376
- Time zone: UTC−3 (BRT)

Fama, Minas Gerais is a municipality in the state of Minas Gerais in the Southeast region of Brazil.

== See also ==
- List of municipalities in Minas Gerais
