= Santana da Vargem =

Brazilian municipality

Coordinates: 21°14′13″S 45°30′32″W

- Municipality
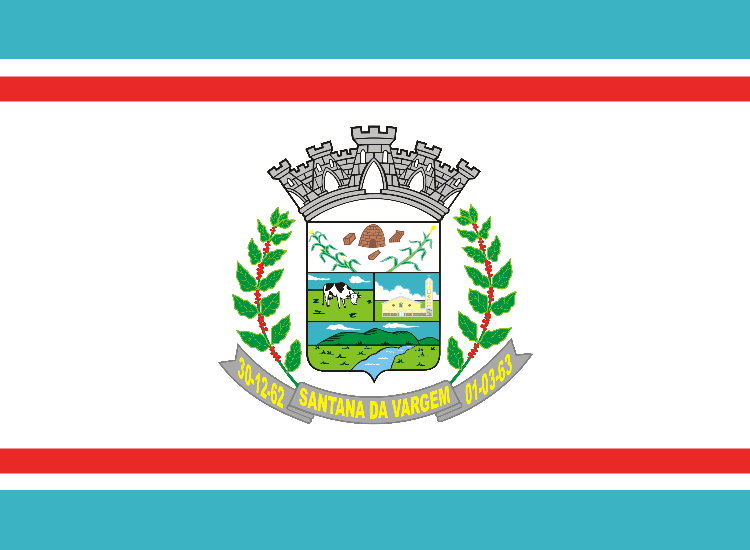
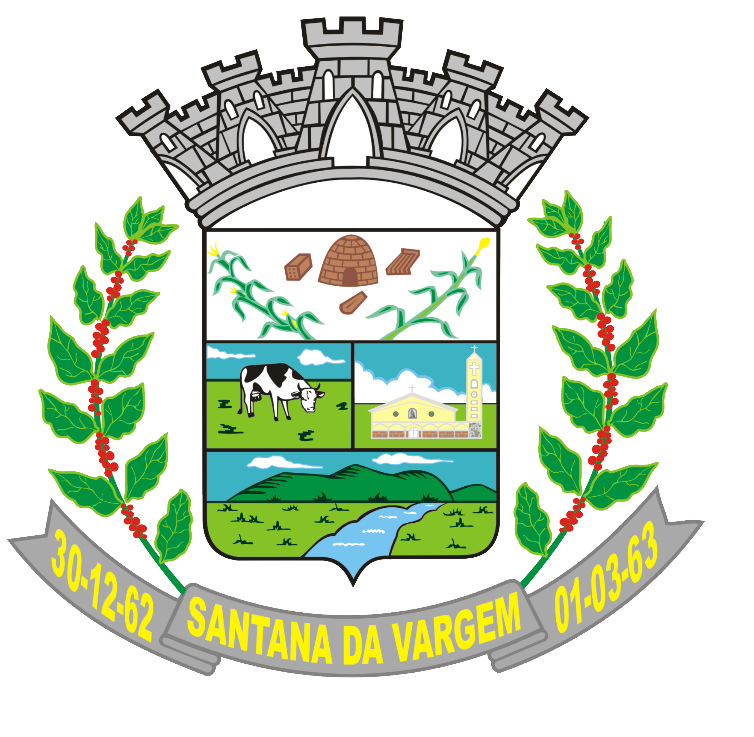
- Flag Coat of arms
- Interactive map of Santana da Vargem
- Country: Brazil
- State: Minas Gerais
- Region: Southeast
- Time zone: UTC−3 (BRT)

Location of Santana da Vargem in the state of Minas Gerais

Santana da Vargem is a municipality in the south of the Brazilian state of Minas Gerais. In 2020 the population was 7,073 in a total area of 173 km^{2}. The elevation of the municipal seat is 804 meters. Santana da Vargem became a municipality in 1962.

== Geography ==
Neighboring municipalities are Três Pontas, Campos Gerais, Boa Esperança, and Coqueiral. Santana da Vargem is part of the IBGE statistical microregion of Varginha. It is 15 km north of Três Pontas and 41 km. north of Varginha. Lavras is 65 km. to the east. The distance to Belo Horizonte is 261 km. and the distance to Rio de Janeiro is 440 km. The main highways serving the city are BR-381 and BR-265.

== Economy ==
The main economic activities are agriculture, especially the growing of coffee, and production of milk and cheese. In 2006 there were 411 rural properties with agricultural land area of 13,153. The main crops were coffee, with 9,000 ha. planted, corn, with 1,200 ha, and various fruits like oranges, bananas, and passion fruit. There was one financial institution.

In the health sector there were 4 public health clinics. There were 6 primary schools and 1 middle school.

== Municipal Human Development Index ==
- MHDI: .749
- State ranking: 292 out of 853 municipalities
- National ranking: 1,909 out of 5,138 municipalities
- Life expectancy: 70 years at birth
- Literacy rate: 85% (See Frigoletto for the complete list)

== See also ==
- List of municipalities in Minas Gerais
