= BR-265 (Brazil highway) =

Highway in Brazil

BR-265

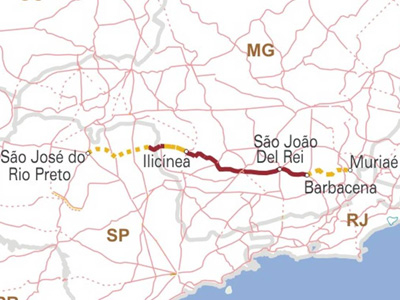

Route information
- Length: 916.2 km (569.3 mi)

Major junctions
- East end: BR-116 in Muriaé
- West end: Avenida Doutor Fernando Costa im São José do Rio Preto

Location
- Country: Brazil

Highway system
- Highways in Brazil; Federal

The BR-265 is a Brazilian federal highway. It has a length of 916.2 km (569.3 mi) and connects the municipalities of Muriaé (MG) and São José do Rio Preto (SP), connecting the Brazilian states of Minas Gerais and São Paulo, in addition to approaching the border between the states of Rio de Janeiro and Espírito Santo.

It is mostly composed of a single track and has sections in the middle of mountains, in the Zona da Mata, as well as sections in the middle of farms, mainly in the Southwest region of Minas.
