= Alfenas =

City and municipality in the southern part of the Brazilian state of Minas Gerais

Coordinates: 21°26′S 45°57′W

- Municipality
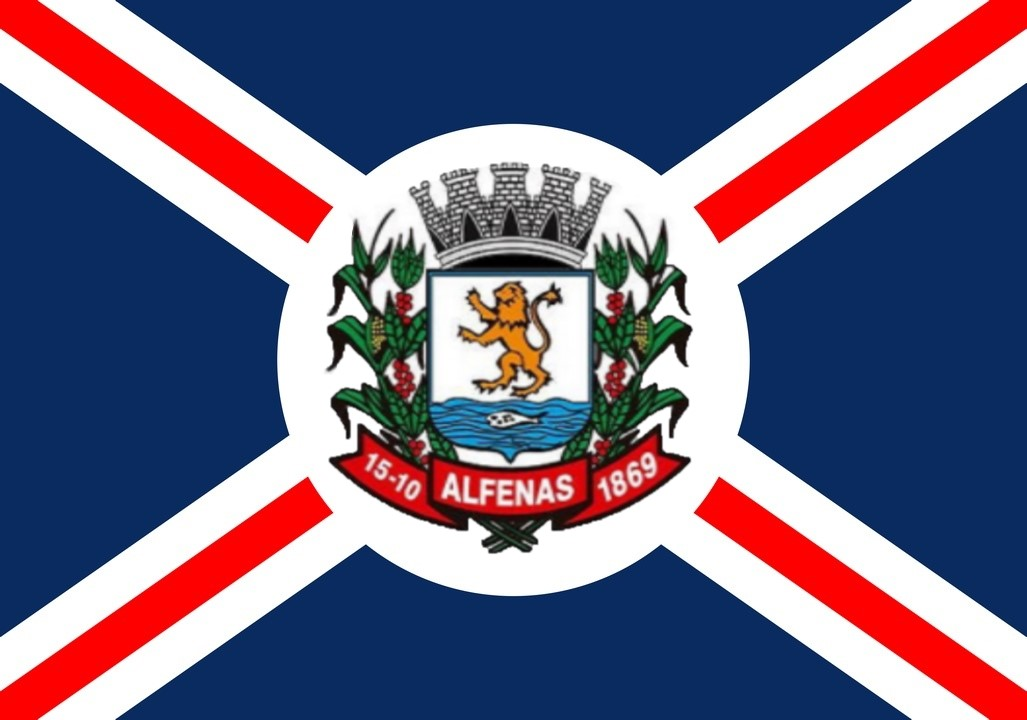
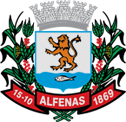
- Flag Coat of arms
- Interactive map of Alfenas
- Country: Brazil
- State: Minas Gerais
- Region: Southeast
- Time zone: UTC−3 (BRT)

Location of Alfenas

Alfenas is a municipality in the southern part of the Brazilian state of Minas Gerais. In 2020 its population was 80,494 and the area of the municipality is 849 km^{2}. The elevation is 888m. It is served by highways MG 179, BR 491 and BR 369. The distance to the state capital of Belo Horizonte is 335 km and the distance to São Paulo is 300 km. The slogan for the city is "Alfenas, the gateway to the sea of Minas", in reference to nearby Lake Furnas.

== Name ==
The toponym Alfenas refers to a colonial family that settled in the area. Members of the family of Martins Alfena were among the first to settle in the area that would become Alfenas. The family name refers to the city of Alfena in northern Portugal, which received its name from the Arabic al-h̥enna (الحنة, henna).

== Economy ==
The main economic activity is the growing of coffee, with a planted area of 16,000 ha. Alfenas is the headquarters of the Brazil Specialty Coffee Association. After coffee other crops are corn, with 6,000 ha., potatoes, beans, tomatoes, and vegetables. Bananas and citrus fruits are also grown.

== Agricultural data for 2006 ==
- Number of farms: 1,102
- Farm area: 56,821 ha.
- Area of permanent crops: 13,900
- Area of perennial crops: 7,074 ha.
- Agricultural workers related to the producer: 2,926
- Agricultural workers not related to the producer: 4,625
- Number of tractors: 553

== Health and educational data for 2006 ==
- Hospitals: 4 private with 477 beds
- Health clinics: 12 public and 13 private
- Schools: 30 primary schools (20 public and 10 private) and 10 middle schools (6 public and 4 private)

== Municipal Human Development Index ==
- MHDI: .829
- State ranking: 8 out of 853 municipalities
- National ranking: 144 out of 5,138 municipalities
- Life expectancy: 76.8
- Literacy rate: 91 Frigoletto

== Higher education ==
Alfenas is an important university is well known around the country for its courses in agronomy and dentistry.

- Unifenas (Universide José do Rosario Velano). This private school had 18 undergraduate courses and an enrollment of 4,549 in 2005. There are graduate courses in animal science and health.

There were courses in medicine, dentistry, pharmacy, and nursing among others.

- Unifal (Universidade Federal de Alfenas). This public school had 33 undergraduate courses in dentistry, nursing and pharmacy among others. Enrollment was over 5,000 students in 2013. There are graduate courses in chemistry, pharmacy, health sciences and others.

== Tourism ==
One of Brazil's largest artificial lakes, Furnas is located scant kilometres away to the north. It bathes 34 municipalities. Its waters are used for boating, jet-skiing, swimming, and fishing. The lake attracts a great number of tourists to the region and the city is well served by hotels. In 2006 there were 18 hotels with approximately 1,200 rooms.

== See also ==
- List of municipalities in Minas Gerais
