= 2008 Sport Club do Recife season =

Sport Recife
2008 season
- Chairman: Milton Caldas Bivar
- Manager: Nelsinho Baptista
- Stadium: Ilha do Retiro
- Série A: 11th
- Pernambucano: Champions (37th title)
- Copa do Brasil: Champions (1st title)
- Top goalscorer: League: Roger (11); All: Romerito (17)
Home colours	Away colours	Third colours

The 2008 season was Sport Recife's 104th season in the club's history. Sport competed in the Campeonato Pernambucano, Série A and Copa do Brasil. The season was historical for Sport when the club won its first Copa do Brasil title defeating Corinthians in the second match of the final by 2–0 (3–3 in aggregated score). Carlinhos Bala and Luciano Henrique scored the winning goals, comeback the loss in the first match by 3–1. Along the year Lions of the Island conquered the 37th title of state league Campeonato Pernambucano, and reached the 11th position in the national league Campeonato Brasileiro Série A.

== Squad ==
Note: Flags indicate national team as defined under FIFA eligibility rules; some limited exceptions apply. Players may hold more than one non-FIFA nationality.

No.	Pos.	Nation	Player
--	GK	BRA	Magrão
--	GK	BRA	Cléber
--	GK	BRA	Jeferson
--	GK	BRA	Saulo
--	DF	BRA	Dutra
--	DF	BRA	Diogo
--	DF	BRA	Luisinho Netto
--	DF	BRA	Márcio Goiano
--	DF	BRA	Cássio Lopes
--	DF	BRA	Sidny
--	DF	BRA	Durval
--	DF	BRA	Elias
--	DF	BRA	Igor
--	DF	BRA	César Lucena
--	DF	BRA	Gabriel Santos
--	MF	BRA	Bia
--	MF	BRA	Éverton
--	MF	BRA	Fábio Gomes

No.	Pos.	Nation	Player
--	MF	BRA	Júnior Maranhão
--	MF	BRA	Sandro Goiano
--	MF	BRA	Daniel Paulista
--	DF	BRA	Dudé
--	DF	BRA	Moacir
--	MF	BRA	Kassio
--	MF	BRA	Luciano Henrique
--	MF	BRA	Francisco Alex
--	MF	BRA	Juninho
--	MF	BRA	Fumagalli
--	FW	BRA	Jadílson
--	FW	BRA	Carlinhos Bala
--	FW	BRA	Leandro Machado
--	FW	BRA	Enílton
--	FW	BRA	Roger
--	FW	BRA	Joélson
--	FW	BRA	Lúcio

== Statistics ==
=== Overall ===
Games played	72 (22 Pernambucano, 12 Copa do Brasil, 38 Série A)
Games won	36 (15 Pernambucano, 7 Copa do Brasil, 14 Série A)
Games drawn	17 (5 Pernambucano, 2 Copa do Brasil, 10 Série A)
Games lost	19 (2 Pernambucano, 3 Copa do Brasil, 14 Série A)
Goals scored	122
Goals conceded	73
Goal difference	+49
Best results (goal difference)	8–0 (H) v Serrano - Pernambucano - 2008.02.17
Worst result (goal difference)	0–4 (A) v Vasco da Gama - Série A - 2008.07.10
Top scorer	Romerito (17)

Source: Sport Recife official website

=== Goalscorers ===
Place	Pos.	Nat.	No.	Name	Campeonato Pernambucano	Copa do Brasil	Série A	Total
1	MF	(Brazil)	10	Romerito	11	6	0	17
2	DF	(Brazil)	4	Durval	3	3	8	14
3	FW	(Brazil)	18	Roger	0	2	11	13
4	FW	(Brazil)	11	Carlinhos Bala	7	3	2	12
5	FW	(Brazil)	9	Leandro Machado	6	1	2	9
6	FW	(Brazil)	17	Enílton	6	2	0	8
7	FW	(Brazil)	10	Luciano Henrique	2	1	4	7
8	DF	(Brazil)	13	Luisinho Netto	5	1	0	6
9	MF	(Brazil)	18	Ciro	0	0	4	4
9	FW	(Brazil)	11	Wilson	0	0	4	4
10	DF	(Brazil)	6	Dutra	0	2	1	3
10	DF	(Brazil)	3	Igor	2	1	0	3
10	MF	(Brazil)	14	Júnior Maranhão	0	0	3	3
10	MF	(Brazil)	7	Kássio	2	0	1	3
10	FW	(Brazil)	18	Reginaldo	2	1	0	3
11	DF	(Brazil)	2	César	1	0	1	2
11	MF	(Brazil)	7	Fumagalli	0	0	2	2
11	MF	(Brazil)	8	Sandro Goiano	1	0	1	2
12	MF	(Brazil)	5	Daniel Paulista	0	1	0	1
12	MF	(Brazil)	16	Éverton	1	0	0	1
12	MF	(Brazil)	10	Francisco Alex	0	0	1	1
12	DF	(Brazil)	20	Márcio Goiano	0	0	1	1
				Own goals	1	0	2	3
				Total	50	24	48	122

=== Managers performance ===
Name	From	To	P	W	D	L	GF	GA	Avg%	Ref
(Brazil) Nelsinho Baptista	12 January 2008	7 December 2008	72	36	17	19	122	73	58%	

== Competitions ==
=== Campeonato Pernambucano ===
==== First stage ====
12 January 2008 1	Sport	4–0	Salgueiro	Recife
16:00 (UTC-3)	Reginaldo 11', 56'; Luisinho Netto 45'; Romerito 63' (pen.)	Report		Stadium: Estádio Adelmar da Costa Carvalho (Ilha do Retiro); Attendance: 18,025; Referee: Ricardo Tavares

16 January 2008 2	Sete de Setembro	1–1	Sport	Garanhuns
20:40 (UTC-3)	Jean 72'	Report	Romerito 61'	Stadium: Estádio Gigante do Agreste; Attendance: 4,962; Referee: Patrício Souza

20 January 2008 3	Sport	3–2	Central	Recife
16:00 (UTC-3)	Igor; Luisinho Netto; Romerito 90+1'		Romerito (pen.); Cláudio	Stadium: Estádio Adelmar da Costa Carvalho (Ilha do Retiro)

23 January 2008 4	Central	2–3	Sport	Caruaru
20:30 (UTC-3)	Leonardo 38'; Fábio Silva 84'	Report	Carlinhos Bala 52', 90+2'; Romerito 55'	Stadium: Estádio Luiz José de Lacerda (Lacerdão); Referee: Emerson Sobral

27 January 2008 5	Salgueiro	0–0	Sport	Salgueiro
15:00 (UTC-3)		Report		Stadium: Estádio Cornélio de Barros; Referee: Emerson Sobral

31 January 2008 6	Sport	2–0	Sete de Setembro	Recife
20:30 (UTC-3)	Romerito 68'; Enílton 70'	Report		Stadium: Estádio Adelmar da Costa Carvalho (Ilha do Retiro); Attendance: 18,702; Referee: Nielson Nogueira

==== Second stage ====
7 February 2008 1	Sport	2–1	Vera Cruz	Recife
20:45 (UTC-3)	Enílton 24', 50'	Report	Ney Paraíba 20'	Stadium: Estádio Adelmar da Costa Carvalho (Ilha do Retiro); Attendance: 20,097; Referee: Adriano Siebra

10 February 2008 2	Salgueiro	1–3	Sport	Salgueiro
15:00 (UTC-3)	Israel		Carlinhos Bala; Durval; Romerito	Stadium: Estádio Cornélio de Barros

13 February 2008 3	Serrano	1–0	Sport	Serra Talhada
20:30 (UTC-3)	Goal	Report		Stadium: Estádio Nildo Pereira de Menezes

17 February 2008 4	Sport	8–0	Serrano	Recife
16:00 (UTC-3)	Luisinho Netto 6'; Leandro Machado 16', 23', 31'; Igor 35'; Kássio 62'; Edu Matos 86' (o.g.); Enílton 89'	Report		Stadium: Estádio Adelmar da Costa Carvalho (Ilha do Retiro); Attendance: 13,353; Referee: Emerson Sobral

23 February 2008 5	Vera Cruz	2–4	Sport	Vitória de Santo Antão
16:00 (UTC-3)	Careca; Ricardo		Kássio 10'; Leandro Machado; Luciano Henrique (pen.); Éverton	Stadium: Estádio Municipal Severino Cândido Carneiro

2 March 2008 6	Sport	4–1	Salgueiro	Recife
16:00 (UTC-3)	Romerito 15', 42'; Leandro Machado 45'; Luciano Henrique 86'		Jaime 31'	Stadium: Estádio Adelmar da Costa Carvalho (Ilha do Retiro); Attendance: 25,828; Referee: Gleydson Leite

==== Final stage ====
9 March 2008 1	Sport	3–0	Salgueiro	Recife
17:30 (UTC-3)	Carlinhos Bala, Romerito	Report		Stadium: Estádio Adelmar da Costa Carvalho (Ilha do Retiro)

12 March 2008 2	Central	0–2	Sport	Caruaru
20:30 (UTC-3)		Report	Durval; Carlinhos Bala	Stadium: Estádio Luiz José de Lacerda (Lacerdão)

16 March 2008 3	Náutico	0–1	Sport	Recife
16:00 (UTC-3)		Report	Durval 11'	Stadium: Estádio Eládio de Barros Carvalho (Aflitos); Attendance: 19,897; Referee: Wilson Souza de Mendonça

23 March 2008 4	Sport	2–1	Ypiranga	Recife
16:00 (UTC-3)	Romerito 56'; Carlinhos Bala 63'	Report	Juninho 46'	Stadium: Estádio Adelmar da Costa Carvalho (Ilha do Retiro); Referee: Carlos Costa

26 March 2008 5	Serrano	1–0	Sport	Serra Talhada
20:30 (UTC-3)	Ivson 81'	Report		Stadium: Estádio Nildo Pereira de Menezes

30 March 2008 6	Ypiranga	1–1	Sport	Santa Cruz do Capibaribe
16:00 (UTC-3)	Edmundo	Report	Luisinho Netto	Stadium: Estádio Otávio Limeira Alves; Attendance: 3,957; Referee: Wílson Souza

6 April 2008 7	Sport	3–0	Serrano	Recife
16:00 (UTC-3)	César 20'; Enílton 62', 83'	Report		Stadium: Estádio Adelmar da Costa Carvalho (Ilha do Retiro)

13 April 2008 8	Salgueiro	0–3	Sport	Caruaru
16:00 (UTC-3)		Report	Romerito; Luisinho Netto; Sandro Goiano	Stadium: Estádio Antônio Inácio

16 April 2008 9	Sport	1–1	Central	Recife
21:45 (UTC-3)	Leandro Machado 13'	Report	Bebeto 32'	Stadium: Estádio Adelmar da Costa Carvalho (Ilha do Retiro); Attendance: 24,812; Referee: Gleydson Leite

20 April 2008 10	Sport	0–0	Náutico	Recife
16:00 (UTC-3)		Report		Stadium: Estádio Adelmar da Costa Carvalho (Ilha do Retiro)

==== Record ====
Final Position	Points	Matches	Wins	Draws	Losses	Goals For	Goals Away	Win%
1st	50	22	15	5	2	50	15	75%

=== Copa do Brasil ===
==== First round ====
27 February 2008	Imperatriz	2–2	Sport	Imperatriz
21:45 (UTC-3)	Fabinho Paulinho 17'; Valdenes 87'	Report	Durval 16'; Carlinhos Bala 77' (pen.)	Stadium: Estádio Frei Epifânio D'Abadia; Attendance: 3,746; Referee: Antonio Santos Nunes

5 March 2008	Sport	4–1	Imperatriz	Recife
20:30 (UTC-3)	Luisinho Netto 13'; Romerito 15'; Igor 16'; Reginaldo 70'	Report	Fabinho Paulista 56'	Stadium: Estádio Adelmar da Costa Carvalho (Ilha do Retiro); Attendance: 12,121; Referee: Suélson de França Medeiros

==== Second round ====
2 April 2008	Brasiliense	1–2	Sport	Taguatinga
21:50 (UTC-3)	Patrick 1'	Report	Dutra 33'; Romerito 77'	Stadium: Estádio Elmo Serejo Farias (Boca do Jacaré); Attendance: 4,282; Referee: Milton Albuquerque Silva

9 April 2008	Sport	4–1	Brasiliense	Recife
20:30 (UTC-3)	Carlinhos Bala 23'; Enílton 29'; Roger 40'; Romerito 56'	Report	Iranildo 81'	Stadium: Estádio Adelmar da Costa Carvalho (Ilha do Retiro); Attendance: 14,479; Referee: Domingos Viana Filho

==== Round of 16 ====
24 April 2008	Palmeiras	0–0	Sport	São Paulo
21:30 (UTC-3)		Report		Stadium: Estádio Palestra Itália (Parque Antártica); Attendance: 16,038; Referee: Djalma Jose Beltrami Teixeira

30 April 2008	Sport	4–1	Palmeiras	Recife
21:50 (UTC-3)	Romerito 7', 31', 42'; Dutra 65'	Report	Alex Mineiro 15'	Stadium: Estádio Adelmar da Costa Carvalho (Ilha do Retiro); Attendance: 34,009; Referee: Héber Roberto Lopes

==== Quarter-finals ====
7 May 2008	Internacional	1–0	Sport	Porto Alegre
21:45 (UTC-3)	Alex 53'	Report		Stadium: Estádio José Pinheiro Borda (Beira-Rio); Attendance: 41,766; Referee: Paulo César de Oliveira

14 May 2008	Sport	3–1	Internacional	Recife
21:45 (UTC-3)	Leandro Machado 29'; Roger 61'; Durval 78'	Report	Sidnei 29'	Stadium: Estádio Adelmar da Costa Carvalho (Ilha do Retiro); Attendance: 31,555; Referee: Héber Roberto Lopes

==== Semi-finals ====
21 May 2008	Sport	2–0	Vasco da Gama	Recife
21:50 (UTC-3)	Durval 15'; Daniel Paulista 18'	Report		Stadium: Estádio Adelmar da Costa Carvalho (Ilha do Retiro); Attendance: 34,201; Referee: Evandro Rogério Roman

28 May 2008	Vasco da Gama	2–0 (4–5 p)	Sport	Rio de Janeiro
21:50 (UTC-3)	Leandro Amaral 64'; Edmundo 90'	Report		Stadium: Estádio Vasco da Gama (São Januário); Attendance: 24,033; Referee: Alício Pena Júnior
	Penalties
	Edmundo (penalty missed); Leandro Amaral (penalty scored); Tiago (penalty scored); Leandro Bonfim (penalty scored); Wagner Diniz (penalty scored)		(penalty scored) Luisinho Netto; (penalty scored) Fábio Gomes; (penalty scored) Magrão; (penalty scored) Dutra; (penalty scored) Carlinhos Bala

==== Finals ====
4 June 2008	Corinthians	3–1	Sport	São Paulo
21:50 (UTC-3)	Dentinho 18'; Herrera 23'; Acosta 76'	Report	Enílton 90+1'	Stadium: Estádio Cícero Pompeu de Toledo (Morumbi); Attendance: 63,871; Referee: Héber Roberto Lopes

11 June 2008	Sport	2–0	Corinthians	Recife
21:50 (UTC-3)	Carlinhos Bala 34'; Luciano Henrique 37'	Report		Stadium: Estádio Adelmar da Costa Carvalho (Ilha do Retiro); Attendance: 33,921; Referee: AlÍcio Pena Júnior

==== Record ====
Final Position	Points	Matches	Wins	Draws	Losses	Goals For	Goals Away	Win%
1st	23	12	7	2	3	24	13	64%

=== Série A ===
11 May 2008 1	Botafogo	2–0	Sport	Rio de Janeiro
16:00 (UTC-3)	Jorge Henrique 34'; Diguinho 90+19'	Report		Stadium: Estádio Olímpico João Havelange (Engenhão); Attendance: 2,652; Referee: Cléber Wellington Abade

17 May 2008 2	Sport	0–0	Vitória	Recife
18:10 (UTC-3)		Report		Stadium: Estádio Adelmar da Costa Carvalho (Ilha do Retiro); Attendance: 21,819; Referee: Leonardo Gaciba

25 May 2008 3	Sport	2–1	Fluminense	Recife
16:00 (UTC-3)	Júnior Maranhão 23'; Leandro Machado 81'	Report	Dodô 88'	Stadium: Estádio Adelmar da Costa Carvalho (Ilha do Retiro); Attendance: 16,953; Referee: Leandro Vuaden

31 May 2008 4	Internacional	1–1	Sport	Porto Alegre
18:10 (UTC-3)	Alex 5'	Report	Leandro Machado 13'	Stadium: Estádio José Pinheiro Borda (Beira-Rio); Attendance: 16,677; Referee: Jailson Macedo Freitas

8 June 2008 5	Sport	2–0	Palmeiras	Recife
16:00 (UTC-3)	Luciano Henrique 59'; Roger 87'	Report		Stadium: Estádio Adelmar da Costa Carvalho (Ilha do Retiro); Attendance: 17,899; Referee: Jailson Macedo Matias

14 June 2008 6	Figueirense	3–1	Sport	Florianópolis
16:10 (UTC-3)	Tadeu 42'; Ramón 54'; Cleiton Xavier 87'	Report	Luciano Henrique 58'	Stadium: Estádio Orlando Scarpelli; Attendance: 4,791; Referee: Paulo César Oliveira

21 June 2008 7	São Paulo	1–0	Sport	São Paulo
18:20 (UTC-3)	Hugo 90'	Report		Stadium: Estádio Cícero Pompeu de Toledo (Morumbi); Attendance: 11,560; Referee: Gutemberg de Paula Fonseca

29 June 2008 8	Sport	1–2	Flamengo	Recife
16:00 (UTC-3)	Francisco Alex 75'	Report	Obina 54', 90+2'	Stadium: Estádio Adelmar da Costa Carvalho (Ilha do Retiro); Attendance: 27,600; Referee: Sálvio Spínola

5 July 2008 9	Sport	1–0	Cruzeiro	Recife
18:10 (UTC-3)	Marquinhos Paraná 72' (o.g.)	Report		Stadium: Estádio Adelmar da Costa Carvalho (Ilha do Retiro); Referee: Giulliano Bozzano

10 July 2008 10	Vasco da Gama	4–0	Sport	Rio de Janeiro
20:30 (UTC-3)	Morais 35'; Pablo 54'; Jean 67'; Edmundo 70'	Report		Stadium: Estádio Vasco da Gama (São Januário); Referee: Antonio Hora Filho

13 July 2008 11	Náutico	0–2	Sport	Recife
18:10 (UTC-3)		Report	Carlinhos Bala 10'; Durval 48'	Stadium: Estádio Eládio de Barros Carvalho (Aflitos); Attendance: 19,141; Referee: Wilson Souza de Mendonça

16 July 2008 12	Sport	2–2	Grêmio	Recife
19:30 (UTC-3)	Durval 60', 82'	Report	William Magrão 52'; Rodrigo Mendes 63'	Stadium: Estádio Adelmar da Costa Carvalho (Ilha do Retiro); Referee: Paulo César Oliveira

20 July 2008 13	Santos	1–0	Sport	Santos
16:00 (UTC-3)	Kléber Pereira 44'	Report		Stadium: Estádio Urbano Caldeira (Vila Belmiro); Attendance: 13,970; Referee: Luiz Alberto Sardinha

24 July 2008 14	Sport	1–0	Atlético Paranaense	Recife
20:30 (UTC-3)	Luciano Henrique 52'	Report		Stadium: Estádio Adelmar da Costa Carvalho (Ilha do Retiro); Attendance: 21.762; Referee: Djalma José Beltrami Teixeira

27 July 2008 15	Goiás	1–2	Sport	Goiânia
16:00 (UTC-3)	Vítor 36'	Report	Júnior Maranhão 33'; Durval 74'	Stadium: Estádio do Governo do Estado de Goiás (Serra Dourada); Referee: Pablo dos Santos Alves

31 July 2008 16	Sport	3–1	Ipatinga	Recife
20:30 (UTC-3)	Carlinhos Bala 61'; Luciano Henrique 73' (o.g.); Ciro 88'	Report	Beto 81'	Stadium: Estádio Adelmar da Costa Carvalho (Ilha do Retiro); Referee: Sandro Meira Ricci

3 August 2008 17	Atlético Mineiro	2–1	Sport	Belo Horizonte
18:10 (UTC-3)	Marques 15'; Gedeon 77'	Report	Roger 14'	Stadium: Estádio Governador Magalhães Pinto (Mineirão); Attendance: 639; Referee: Djalma José Beltrami

6 August 2008 18	Sport	2–0	Portuguesa	Recife
20:30 (UTC-3)	Roger 45'; Bruno Rodrigo 57' (o.g.)	Report		Stadium: Estádio Adelmar da Costa Carvalho (Ilha do Retiro); Referee: Antonio Hora Filho

10 August 2008 19	Coritiba	3–0	Sport	Curitiba
16:00 (UTC-3)	Marlos 16'; Keirrison 28', 55'	Report		Stadium: Estádio Major Antônio (Couto Pereira); Attendance: 20,077; Referee: Willian Souza Nery

17 August 2008 20	Sport	0–1	Botafogo	Recife
18:10 (UTC-3)		Report	Jorge Henrique 55'	Stadium: Estádio Adelmar da Costa Carvalho (Ilha do Retiro); Attendance: 20,412; Referee: Wallace Valente

20 August 2008 21	Vitória	0–0	Sport	Salvador
19:30 (UTC-3)		Report		Stadium: Estádio Manoel Barradas (Barradão); Attendance: 7,618; Referee: Pablo dos Santos Alves

23 August 2008 22	Fluminense	1–1	Sport	Rio de Janeiro
18:20 (UTC-3)	Washington 84' (pen.)	Report	Roger 14'	Stadium: Estádio Jornalista Mário Filho (Maracanã); Referee: Elmo Resende Cunha

31 August 2008 23	Sport	1–0	Internacional	Recife
16:00 (UTC-3)	Dutra 57'	Report		Stadium: Estádio Adelmar da Costa Carvalho (Ilha do Retiro); Attendance: 21,030; Referee: Wagner Tardelli

4 September 2008 24	Palmeiras	0–3	Sport	São Paulo
20:30 (UTC-3)		Report	Roger 26', 67'; Durval 78'	Stadium: Estádio Palestra Itália (Parque Antártica); Attendance: 15,992; Referee: Francisco Assis Filho

14 September 2008 25	Sport	5–0	Figueirense	Recife
16:00 (UTC-3)	Roger 5', 52'; Júnior Maranhão 29'; Wilson 60'; Sandro Goiano 76'	Report		Stadium: Estádio Adelmar da Costa Carvalho (Ilha do Retiro); Referee: Wilson Luiz Seneme

21 September 2008 26	Sport	0–0	São Paulo	Recife
16:00 (UTC-3)		Report		Stadium: Estádio Adelmar da Costa Carvalho (Ilha do Retiro); Referee: Djalma José Beltrami

27 September 2008 27	Flamengo	2–1	Sport	Rio de Janeiro
18:20 (UTC-3)	Juan 81'; Vandinho 89'	Report	Roger 54'	Stadium: Estádio Jornalista Mário Filho (Maracanã); Attendance: 43,796; Referee: Ricardo Marques Ribeiro

2 October 2008 28	Cruzeiro	1–0	Sport	Belo Horizonte
20:30 (UTC-3)	Gérson Magrão 68'	Report		Stadium: Estádio Governador Magalhães Pinto (Mineirão); Attendance: 8,931; Referee: Carlos Eugênio Simon

2 October 2008 29	Sport	2–2	Vasco da Gama	Recife
22:00 (UTC-3)	Kássio 37'; Ciro 90+1'	Report	Leandro Amaral 40', 45'	Stadium: Estádio Adelmar da Costa Carvalho (Ilha do Retiro); Referee: Wilson Luiz Seneme

19 October 2008 30	Sport	2–2	Náutico	Recife
18:10 (UTC-3)	Durval 45+2'; Roger 47'	Report	Gilmar 18'; Felipe 59'	Stadium: Estádio Adelmar da Costa Carvalho (Ilha do Retiro); Attendance: 28,512; Referee: Alicio Pena Júnior

23 October 2008 31	Grêmio	1–0	Sport	Porto Alegre
20:30 (UTC-3)	Reinaldo 1'	Report		Stadium: Estádio Olímpico Monumental; Referee: Wagner Tardelli

30 October 2008 32	Sport	1–1	Santos	Recife
20:30 (UTC-3)	Fumagalli 30' (pen.)	Report	Kléber Pereira 45'	Stadium: Estádio Adelmar da Costa Carvalho (Ilha do Retiro); Attendance: 15,000; Referee: Leonardo Gaciba

2 November 2008 33	Atlético Paranaense	1–0	Sport	Curitiba
17:00 (UTC-3)	Rafael Moura 90'	Report		Stadium: Kyocera Arena (Arena da Baixada); Referee: Sálvio Spínola

9 November 2008 34	Sport	2–1	Goiás	Recife
17:00 (UTC-3)	César 21'; Roger 24'	Report	Fahel 34'	Stadium: Estádio Adelmar da Costa Carvalho (Ilha do Retiro); Referee: Luís Antonio Silva Santos

15 November 2008 35	Ipatinga	3–0	Sport	Ipatinga
18:30 (UTC-3)	Ferreira 12', 90+4' (pen.); Gian 84'	Report		Stadium: Estádio Municipal João Lamego Netto (Ipatingão); Attendance: 530; Referee: Sandro Meira Ricci

23 November 2008 36	Sport	3–0	Atlético Mineiro	Recife
19:10 (UTC-3)	Durval 82'; Ciro 84', 88'	Report		Stadium: Estádio Adelmar da Costa Carvalho (Ilha do Retiro); Attendance: 13,871; Referee: Arnoldo Vasconcelos Figarela

30 November 2008 37	Portuguesa	2–2	Sport	São Paulo
17:00 (UTC-3)	Edno 17'; Jonas 32'	Report	Márcio Goiano 12'; Fumagalli 73'	Stadium: Estádio Oswaldo Teixeira Duarte (Canindé); Attendance: 3,565; Referee: Elmo Resende Cunha

7 December 2008 38	Sport	4–3	Coritiba	Recife
17:00 (UTC-3)	Wilson 7', 14', 45+2'; Durval 89'	Report	Marlos 16'; Keirrison 31'; Rodrigo Mancha 78'	Stadium: Estádio Adelmar da Costa Carvalho (Ilha do Retiro); Attendance: 12,978; Referee: Maurício Aparecido Siqueira

==== Record ====
Final Position	Points	Matches	Wins	Draws	Losses	Goals For	Goals Away	Win%
11th	52	38	14	10	14	48	45	45%
