= 2008 Clube Náutico Capibaribe season =

Náutico
2008 season
- Chairman: Maurício Cardoso
- Manager: Roberto Fernandes; Leandro Machado; Levi Gomes; Sangaletti; Pintado
- Stadium: Estádio dos Aflitos
- Série A: 16th
- Pernambucano: Runners-up
- Copa do Brasil: Third round
| Home colours | Away colours | Third colours |

The 2008 season was Náutico's 108th season in the club's history.

== Statistics ==
=== Overall ===
| Games played | 65 (22 Pernambucano, 5 Copa do Brasil, 38 Série A) |
| Games won | 27 (13 Pernambucano, 3 Copa do Brasil, 11 Série A) |
| Games drawn | 15 (4 Pernambucano, 0 Copa do Brasil, 11 Série A) |
| Games lost | 23 (5 Pernambucano, 2 Copa do Brasil, 16 Série A) |
| Goals scored | 105 |
| Goals conceded | 79 |
| Goal difference | +26 |
| Best results (goal difference) | 7–1 (A) v Roraima – Copa do Brasil – 2008.02.14 |
| Worst result (goal difference) | 0–3 (A) v Flamengo – Série A – 2008.07.05; 0–3 (A) v Goiás – Série A – 2008.08.17 |
| Top scorer | |

Source: Náutico official website

== Competitions ==
=== Campeonato Pernambucano ===
==== First stage ====
| 13 January 2008 1 | Serrano | 1–0 | Náutico | Serra Talhada |
| 16:00 (UTC-3) | Roberval 88' | Report | | Stadium: Estádio Nildo Pereira de Menezes; Attendance: 3,821; Referee: Antônio André Rodrigues |

| 17 January 2008 2 | Náutico | 3–2 | Centro Limoeirense | Recife |
| 20:30 (UTC-3) | Warley 4'; Felipe; Otacílio | Report | Antônio; Maurício | Stadium: Estádio Eládio de Barros Carvalho (Aflitos) |

| 20 January 2008 3 | Porto | 1–2 | Náutico | Caruaru |
| 15:00 (UTC-3) | Marcos Paraná (pen.) | | Geraldo (pen.), (pen.) | Stadium: Estádio Antônio Inácio de Souza |

| 23 January 2008 4 | Náutico | 0–0 | Porto | Recife |
| 20:30 (UTC-3) | | | | Stadium: Estádio Eládio de Barros Carvalho (Aflitos) |

| 27 January 2008 5 | Centro Limoeirense | 2–1 | Náutico | Limoeiro |
| 16:00 (UTC-3) | | | | Stadium: Estádio José Vareda |

| 30 January 2008 6 | Náutico | 5–2 | Serrano | Recife |
| 20:30 (UTC-3) | | | | Stadium: Estádio Eládio de Barros Carvalho (Aflitos) |

==== Second stage ====
| 6 February 2008 1 | Centro Limoeirense | 0–4 | Náutico | Limoeiro |
| 20:45 (UTC-3) | | Report | | Stadium: Estádio José Vareda |

| 9 February 2008 2 | Náutico | 2–1 | Sete de Setembro | Recife |
| 19:00 (UTC-3) | | | | Stadium: Estádio Eládio de Barros Carvalho (Aflitos) |

| 18 February 2008 3 | Petrolina | 1–2 | Náutico | Petrolina |
| 20:30 (UTC-3) | | | | Stadium: Estádio Paulo de Souza Coelho |

| 21 February 2008 4 | Náutico | 5–0 | Petrolina | Recife |
| 20:30 (UTC-3) | | | | Stadium: Estádio Eládio de Barros Carvalho (Aflitos) |

| 24 February 2008 5 | Sete de Setembro | 0–2 | Náutico | Garanhuns |
| 16:00 (UTC-3) | | | | Stadium: Estádio Gigante do Agreste |

| 2 March 2008 6 | Náutico | 3–0 | Centro Limoeirense | Recife |
| 16:00 (UTC-3) | Warley 24'; Geraldo 63'; Wellington 72' | Report | | Stadium: Estádio Eládio de Barros Carvalho (Aflitos); Attendance: 14,040; Referee: Carlos Costa |

==== Final stage ====
| 9 March 2008 1 | Náutico | 3–0 | Central | Recife |
| 16:00 (UTC-3) | | | | Stadium: Estádio Eládio de Barros Carvalho (Aflitos) |

| 12 March 2008 2 | Ypiranga | 3–2 | Náutico | Santa Cruz do Capibaribe |
| 20:30 (UTC-3) | | | | Stadium: Estádio Otávio Limeira Alves |

| 16 March 2008 3 | Náutico | 0–1 | Sport | Recife |
| 16:00 (UTC-3) | | Report | Durval 11' | Stadium: Estádio Eládio de Barros Carvalho (Aflitos); Attendance: 19,897; Referee: Wilson Souza de Mendonça |

| 23 March 2008 4 | Serrano | 1–2 | Náutico | Serra Talhada |
| 16:00 (UTC-3) | | | | Stadium: Estádio Nildo Pereira de Menezes |

| 30 March 2008 6 | Náutico | 5–1 | Serrano | Recife |
| 16:00 (UTC-3) | | | | Stadium: Estádio Eládio de Barros Carvalho (Aflitos) |

| 6 April 2008 7 | Náutico | 6–1 | Ypiranga | Recife |
| 17:30 (UTC-3) | | | | Stadium: Estádio Eládio de Barros Carvalho (Aflitos) |

| 9 April 2008 5* | Salgueiro | 1–0 | Náutico | Salgueiro |
| 21:45 (UTC-3) | | | | Stadium: Estádio Cornélio de Barros |

| 13 April 2008 8 | Central | 1–1 | Náutico | Caruaru |
| 17:30 (UTC-3) | | | | Stadium: Estádio Luiz José de Lacerda |

| 16 April 2008 9 | Náutico | 0–0 | Salgueiro | Recife |
| 20:30 (UTC-3) | | | | Stadium: Estádio Eládio de Barros Carvalho (Aflitos) |

| 20 April 2008 10 | Sport | 0–0 | Náutico | Recife |
| 16:00 (UTC-3) | | Report | | Stadium: Estádio Adelmar da Costa Carvalho (Ilha do Retiro) |

==== Record ====
| Final Position | Points | Matches | Wins | Draws | Losses | Goals For | Goals Away | Avg% |
|---|---|---|---|---|---|---|---|---|
| 2nd | 43 | 22 | 13 | 4 | 5 | 48 | 19 | 65% |

=== Copa do Brasil ===
==== First round ====
| 14 February 2008 | Roraima | 1–7 | Náutico | Manaus |
| 20:45 (UTC-4) | Fumaça 85' | Report | Marcelinho 5'; Wellington 17'; Berg 27'; Paulo Almeida 39' (pen.); Kuki 87'; Alex Sandro 89'; Danilo 90+2' | Stadium: Estádio Vivaldo Lima (Vivaldão); Attendance: 487; Referee: Milton Albuquerque Silva |

==== Second round ====
| 19 March 2008 | Juventus | 2–0 | Náutico | Santa Bárbara d'Oeste |
| 21:45 (UTC-3) | Lima 16', 51' | Report | | Stadium: Estádio Antônio Lins Ribeiro Guimarães; Attendance: 206; Referee: Célio Amorim |

| 2 April 2008 | Náutico | 3–0 | Juventus | Recife |
| 20:30 (UTC-3) | Geraldo 6'; Marcelinho 12'; Wellington 73' | Report | | Stadium: Estádio Eládio de Barros Carvalho (Aflitos); Attendance: 11,260; Referee: Adriano de Carvalho |

==== Third round ====
| 23 April 2008 | Náutico | 3–2 | Atlético Mineiro | Recife |
| 21:50 (UTC-3) | Felipe 12', 32'; Berg 47' | Report | Petković 3'; Danilinho 89' | Stadium: Estádio Eládio de Barros Carvalho (Aflitos); Attendance: 10,437; Referee: Sérgio da Silva Carvalho |

| 30 April 2008 | Atlético Mineiro | 1–0 (a.) | Náutico | Belo Horizonte |
| 21:50 (UTC-3) | Danilinho 67' | Report | | Stadium: Estádio Governador Magalhães Pinto (Mineirão); Attendance: 25,149; Referee: Wilson Luiz Seneme |

==== Record ====
| Final Position | Points | Matches | Wins | Draws | Losses | Goals For | Goals Away | Avg% |
|---|---|---|---|---|---|---|---|---|
| 10th | 9 | 5 | 3 | 0 | 2 | 13 | 6 | 60% |

=== Série A ===
| 10 May 2008 1 | Náutico | 2–1 | Goiás | Recife |
| 18:10 (UTC-3) | Geraldo 2', 57' (pen.) | Report | Anderson Aquino 30' | Stadium: Estádio Eládio de Barros Carvalho (Aflitos); Attendance: 14,620; Referee: João Alberto G Duarte |

| 18 May 2008 2 | Fluminense | 0–2 | Náutico | Rio de Janeiro |
| 16:00 (UTC-3) | | Report | Wellington 71'; Warley 90+4' | Stadium: Estádio Jornalista Mário Filho (Maracanã); Attendance: 7,795; Referee: Luiz Alberto Bites |

| 24 May 2008 3 | Grêmio | 2–0 | Náutico | Porto Alegre |
| 18:10 (UTC-3) | Léo 33'; Perea 66' | Report | | Stadium: Estádio Olímpico Monumental; Attendance: 23,577; Referee: Alicio Pena Júnior |

| 1 June 2008 4 | Náutico | 3–0 | Botafogo | Recife |
| 16:00 (UTC-3) | Felipe 12', 46'; Wellington 62' | Report | | Stadium: Estádio Eládio de Barros Carvalho (Aflitos); Attendance: 17,436; Referee: Wilson Luiz Seneme |

| 7 June 2008 5 | Ipatinga | 0–0 | Náutico | Ipatinga |
| 18:10 (UTC-3) | | Report | | Stadium: Estádio Municipal João Lamego Netto; Attendance: 2,875; Referee: Guilherme Cereta de Lima |

| 14 June 2008 6 | Náutico | 1–1 | Vasco da Gama | Recife |
| 18:20 (UTC-3) | Wellington 68' | Report | Edmundo 72' | Stadium: Estádio Eládio de Barros Carvalho (Aflitos); Attendance: 20,655; Referee: Sérgio da Silva Carvalho |

| 22 June 2008 7 | Náutico | 2–1 | Atlético Mineiro | Recife |
| 18:10 (UTC-3) | Warley 41'; Wellington 78' | Report | Vinícius 59' | Stadium: Estádio Eládio de Barros Carvalho (Aflitos); Attendance: 15,104; Referee: Célio Amorim |

| 29 June 2008 8 | Palmeiras | 2–0 | Náutico | São Paulo |
| 18:10 (UTC-3) | Alex Mineiro 45' (pen.); Denílson 87' | Report | | Stadium: Estádio Palestra Itália (Parque Antártica); Referee: Djalma José Beltrami |

| 5 July 2008 9 | Flamengo | 3–0 | Náutico | Rio de Janeiro |
| 18:10 (UTC-3) | Léo Moura 11'; Marcinho 19'; Kléberson 59' | Report | | Stadium: Estádio Jornalista Mário Filho (Maracanã); Attendance: 44,434; Referee: Jailson Macedo Freitas |

| 9 July 2008 10 | Náutico | 2–1 | São Paulo | Recife |
| 21:45 (UTC-3) | Radamés 22'; Everaldo 57' | Report | Borges 19' | Stadium: Estádio Eládio de Barros Carvalho (Aflitos); Attendance: 18,012; Referee: Wagner Tardelli |

| 13 July 2008 11 | Náutico | 0–2 | Sport | Recife |
| 18:10 (UTC-3) | | Report | Carlinhos Bala 10'; Durval 48' | Stadium: Estádio Eládio de Barros Carvalho (Aflitos); Attendance: 19,141; Referee: Wilson Souza de Mendonça |

| 16 July 2008 12 | Portuguesa | 3–2 | Náutico | São Paulo |
| 20:30 (UTC-3) | Edno 48'; Patrício 83'; Jonas 90' | Report | Felipe 14'; Gilmar 32' | Stadium: Estádio Oswaldo Teixeira Duarte (Canindé); Attendance: 2,266; Referee: Ricardo Marques Ribeiro |

| 20 July 2008 13 | Náutico | 1–1 | Internacional | Recife |
| 16:00 (UTC-3) | Radamés 60' (pen.) | Report | Nilmar 86' | Stadium: Estádio Eládio de Barros Carvalho (Aflitos); Referee: Rodrigo Martins Cintra |

| 23 July 2008 14 | Vitória | 2–0 | Náutico | Salvador |
| 20:30 (UTC-3) | Marquinhos 24', 61' | Report | | Stadium: Estádio Manoel Barradas (Barradão); Attendance: 24,614; Referee: Wagner Tardelli |

| 26 July 2008 15 | Náutico | 1–2 | Coritiba | Recife |
| 18:10 (UTC-3) | Piauí 51' | Report | Guarú 43'; Keirrison 88' | Stadium: Estádio Eládio de Barros Carvalho (Aflitos); Attendance: 12,552; Referee: Marcelo de Lima Henrique |

| 30 July 2008 16 | Cruzeiro | 4–2 | Náutico | Belo Horizonte |
| 19:30 (UTC-3) | Wágner 12'; Guilherme 16' (pen.), 68'; Henrique 55' | Report | Wellington 22'; Geraldo 87' (pen.) | Stadium: Estádio Governador Magalhães Pinto (Mineirão); Attendance: 19,202; Referee: Carlos Eugenio Simon |

| 2 August 2008 17 | Náutico | 1–2 | Figueirense | Recife |
| 18:20 (UTC-3) | Gilmar 50' | Report | Rafael 7', 26' | Stadium: Estádio Eládio de Barros Carvalho (Aflitos); Attendance: 11,380; Referee: Héber Roberto Lopes |

| 6 August 2008 18 | Atlético Paranaense | 2–0 | Náutico | Curitiba |
| 20:30 (UTC-3) | Rafael Moura 18'; Danilo 81' | Report | | Stadium: Kyocera Arena (Arena da Baixada); Referee: Wilson Luiz Seneme |

| 10 August 2008 19 | Náutico | 1–0 | Santos | Recife |
| 18:10 (UTC-3) | Negretti 64' | Report | | Stadium: Estádio Eládio de Barros Carvalho (Aflitos); Attendance: 13,711; Referee: Luis Antônio Silva Santos |

| 17 August 2008 20 | Goiás | 3–0 | Náutico | Goiânia |
| 16:00 (UTC-3) | Paulo Baier 25'; Paulo Henrique 65'; Vítor 71' | Report | | Stadium: Estádio do Governo do Estado de Goiás (Serra Dourada); Referee: Carlos Eugenio Simon |

| 20 August 2008 21 | Náutico | 1–3 | Fluminense | Recife |
| 22:00 (UTC-3) | Kuki 7' | Report | Washington 6', 60', 86' | Stadium: Estádio Eládio de Barros Carvalho (Aflitos); Referee: Antonio Hora Filho |

| 24 August 2008 22 | Náutico | 1–1 | Grêmio | Recife |
| 18:10 (UTC-3) | Paulo Santos 56' | Report | Réver 90+3' | Stadium: Estádio Eládio de Barros Carvalho (Aflitos); Referee: Wagner Tardelli |

| 30 August 2008 23 | Botafogo | 1–1 | Náutico | Rio de Janeiro |
| 18:20 (UTC-3) | Carlos Alberto 39' | Report | Adriano 84' | Stadium: Estádio Olímpico João Havelange (Engenhão); Attendance: 23,946; Referee: Paulo César Oliveira |

| 6 September 2008 24 | Náutico | 2–0 | Ipatinga | Recife |
| 18:20 (UTC-3) | Felipe 78', 88' | Report | | Stadium: Estádio Eládio de Barros Carvalho (Aflitos); Referee: Elmo Resende Cunha |

| 14 September 2008 25 | Vasco da Gama | 1–3 | Náutico | Rio de Janeiro |
| 16:00 (UTC-3) | Leandro Amaral 36' | Report | Clodoaldo 17'; Ruy 81'; Felipe 90+1' | Stadium: Estádio Vasco da Gama (São Januário); Referee: Sálvio Spínola |

| 20 September 2008 26 | Atlético Mineiro | 2–1 | Náutico | Belo Horizonte |
| 18:20 (UTC-3) | Renan Oliveira 33'; Vinícius 65' | Report | Ruy 18' | Stadium: Estádio Governador Magalhães Pinto (Mineirão); Referee: Paulo César de Oliveira |

| 28 September 2008 27 | Náutico | 0–0 | Palmeiras | Recife |
| 16:00 (UTC-3) | | Report | | Stadium: Estádio Eládio de Barros Carvalho (Aflitos); Referee: Leandro Vuaden |

| 4 October 2008 28 | Náutico | 0–2 | Flamengo | Recife |
| 18:20 (UTC-3) | | Report | Marcelinho Paraíba 16' (pen.); Léo Moura 86' | Stadium: Estádio Eládio de Barros Carvalho (Aflitos); Referee: Sálvio Spínola Fagundes Filho |

| 9 October 2008 29 | São Paulo | 1–0 | Náutico | São Paulo |
| 20:30 (UTC-3) | Hernanes 82' | Report | | Stadium: Estádio Cícero Pompeu de Toledo (Morumbi); Referee: Wagner Tardelli |

| 19 October 2008 30 | Sport | 2–2 | Náutico | Recife |
| 18:10 (UTC-3) | Durval 45+2'; Roger 47' | Report | Gilmar 18'; Felipe 59' | Stadium: Estádio Adelmar da Costa Carvalho (Ilha do Retiro); Attendance: 28,512; Referee: Alicio Pena Júnior |

| 25 October 2008 31 | Náutico | 1–1 | Portuguesa | Recife |
| 18:20 (UTC-3) | Felipe 17' | Report | Héverton 86' | Stadium: Estádio Eládio de Barros Carvalho (Aflitos); Attendance: 14,213; Referee: Elmo Resende Cunha |

| 29 October 2008 32 | Internacional | 1–1 | Náutico | Porto Alegre |
| 20:30 (UTC-3) | Ângelo 85' | Report | Vágner 90+3' | Stadium: Estádio José Pinheiro Borda (Beira-Rio); Attendance: 14,464; Referee: Antonio Hora Filho |

| 1 November 2008 33 | Náutico | 1–0 | Vitória | Recife |
| 18:20 (UTC-3) | Felipe 43' (pen.) | Report | | Stadium: Estádio Eládio de Barros Carvalho (Aflitos); Referee: José Henrique Carvalho |

| 9 November 2008 34 | Coritiba | 0–0 | Náutico | Curitiba |
| 17:00 (UTC-3) | | Report | | Stadium: Estádio Major Antônio (Couto Pereira); Attendance: 12,105; Referee: Carlos Eugenio Simon |

| 15 November 2008 35 | Náutico | 5–2 | Cruzeiro | Recife |
| 18:30 (UTC-3) | Gilmar 4', 88'; Felipe 23' (pen.), 48'; Everaldo 83' | Report | Wágner 18'; Guilherme 76' (pen.) | Stadium: Estádio Eládio de Barros Carvalho (Aflitos); Referee: Sérgio da Silva Carvalho |

| 20 November 2008 36 | Figueirense | 4–3 | Náutico | Florianópolis |
| 20:30 (UTC-3) | Tadeu 2'; Cleiton Xavier 9'; Diogo 44'; Bruno Perone 82' | Report | Felipe 1', 71'; Vágner 15' | Stadium: Estádio Orlando Scarpelli; Referee: Wallace Valente |

| 30 November 2008 37 | Náutico | 2–1 | Atlético Paranaense | Recife |
| 17:00 (UTC-3) | Clodoaldo 65', 81' | Report | Ferreira 17' | Stadium: Estádio Eládio de Barros Carvalho (Aflitos); Referee: Leonardo Gaciba |

| 7 December 2008 38 | Santos | 0–0 | Náutico | Santos |
| 17:00 (UTC-3) | | Report | | Stadium: Estádio Urbano Caldeira (Vila Belmiro); Attendance: 14,121; Referee: Sérgio da Silva Carvalho |

==== Record ====
| Final Position | Points | Matches | Wins | Draws | Losses | Goals For | Goals Away | Avg% |
|---|---|---|---|---|---|---|---|---|
| 16th | 44 | 38 | 11 | 11 | 16 | 44 | 54 | 38% |
