= 2010 Sport Club do Recife season =

Sport Recife
2010 season
- Chairman: Sílvio Alexandre Guimarães
- Manager: Givanildo Oliveira; Toninho Cerezo; Geninho
- Stadium: Ilha do Retiro
- Série B: 6th
- Pernambucano: Champions (39th title)
- Copa do Brasil: Round of 16
- Top goalscorer: League: Ciro (16); All: Ciro (31)
Home colours	Away colours

The 2010 season was Sport Recife's 106th season in the club's history. Sport competed in the Campeonato Pernambucano, Série B and Copa do Brasil.

== Squad ==
Note: Flags indicate national team as defined under FIFA eligibility rules; some limited exceptions apply. Players may hold more than one non-FIFA nationality.

No.	Pos.	Nation	Player
1	GK	BRA	Magrão
2	DF	BRA	Montoya
3	DF	BRA	César Lucena (captain)
4	DF	BRA	Tobi
5	DF	BRA	Dutra
6	MF	BRA	Daniel Paulista
7	DF	BRA	Renato
8	MF	BRA	Germano
9	MF	BRA	Marcelinho Paraíba
10	FW	BRA	Ciro
11	FW	BRA	Wilson
12	GK	BRA	Gustavo
13	DF	BRA	Eduardo Ratinho
14	DF	BRA	Igor
15	DF	BRA	André Leone

No.	Pos.	Nation	Player
16	DF	BRA	Géder
17	DF	BRA	Jackson
19	DF	BRA	Mateus
20	MF	BRA	Fabrício
21	MF	BRA	Moisés
22	MF	BRA	Kássio
23	MF	BRA	Zé Antônio
24	MF	BRA	Élton
25	MF	BRA	Levi
26	MF	BRA	Dadá
27	FW	BRA	Dairo
28	FW	BRA	Eliandro
298	FW	BRA	Ruan
30	GK	BRA	Saulo
31	GK	BRA	Thiago

== Statistics ==
=== Overall ===
Games played	69 (26 Pernambucano, 5 Copa do Brasil, 38 Série B)
Games won	35 (18 Pernambucano, 2 Copa do Brasil, 15 Série B)
Games drawn	18 (6 Pernambucano, 1 Copa do Brasil, 11 Série B)
Games lost	16 (2 Pernambucano, 2 Copa do Brasil, 12 Série B)
Goals scored	115
Goals conceded	68
Goal difference	+47
Best results (goal difference)	5–0 (A) v América–RN - Série B - 2010.06.05
Worst result (goal difference)	1–4 (A) v ASA - Série B - 2010.05.22
Top scorer	Ciro (31)

Source: Sport Recife official website

=== Goalscorers ===
Place	Pos.	Nat.	No.	Name	Campeonato Pernambucano	Copa do Brasil	Série B	Total
1	FW	(Brazil)	10	Ciro	13	2	16	31
2	FW	(Brazil)	11	Wilson	6	0	7	13
3	MF	(Brazil)	8	Eduardo Ramos	9	2	1	12
4	FW	(Brazil)	27	Dairo	5	0	3	8
5	MF	(Brazil)	9	Marcelinho Paraíba	0	0	6	6
6	DF	(Brazil)	14	Igor	2	0	2	4
6	DF	(Brazil)	2	Júlio César	4	0	0	4
7	FW	(Brazil)	14	Leandrão	3	0	0	3
7	FW	(Brazil)	11	Nádson	3	0	0	3
7	MF	(Brazil)		Ricardinho	3	0	0	3
7	DF	(Brazil)	4	Tobi	1	1	1	3
7	MF	(Brazil)	23	Zé Antônio	1	0	2	3
8	MF	(Brazil)	6	Daniel Paulista	0	0	2	2
8	DF	(Brazil)	13	Eduardo Ratinho	1	0	1	2
8	MF	(Brazil)	8	Germano	0	0	2	2
8	FW	(Brazil)		Romerito	0	0	2	2
9	MF	(Brazil)		Adriano Pimenta	0	0	1	1
9	DF	(Brazil)	15	André Leone	0	0	1	1
9	MF	(Brazil)	26	Dadá	0	0	1	1
9	DF	(Brazil)		Dirley	0	1	0	1
9	FW	(Brazil)	28	Eliandro	0	0	1	1
9	MF	(Brazil)	24	Élton	0	0	1	1
9	MF	(Brazil)	20	Fabrício	0	0	1	1
9	MF	(Brazil)	10	Juninho Silva	1	0	0	1
9	MF	(Brazil)	25	Levi	1	0	0	1
9	DF	(Brazil)	19	Mateus	0	0	1	1
9	MF	(Brazil)	21	Moisés	0	0	1	1
9	DF	(Brazil)	2	Montoya	0	0	1	1
9	FW	(Brazil)	35	Pedro Júnior	0	0	1	1
				Own goals	1	0	0	1
				Total	54	6	55	115

=== Managers performance ===
Name	From	To	P	W	D	L	GF	GA	Avg%	Ref
(Brazil) Givanildo Oliveira	13 January 2010	25 May 2010	35	20	8	7	64	36	64%	
(Brazil) Toninho Cerezo	29 May 2010	7 August 2010	8	3	2	3	13	9	45%	
(Brazil) Geninho	10 August 2010	27 November 2010	26	12	8	6	38	23	56%	

== Competitions ==
=== Campeonato Pernambucano ===
==== First stage ====
13 January 2010 1	Sport	1–0	Araripina	Recife
20:30 (UTC-3)	Ricardinho 55'			Stadium: Estádio Adelmar da Costa Carvalho (Ilha do Retiro)

17 January 2010 2	Vitória das Tabocas	1–5	Sport	Vitória de Santo Antão
16:00 (UTC-3)	Jadilson (pen.)		Ricardinho 5'; Júlio César 26'; Wilson 35' (pen.), Igor 80'	Stadium: Estádio Municipal Severino Cândido Carneiro

20 January 2010 3	Sport	3–1	Porto	Recife
20:30 (UTC-3)	Wilson; Nádson (pen.); Ciro		Paulista	Stadium: Estádio Adelmar da Costa Carvalho (Ilha do Retiro)

24 January 2010 4	Central	1–2	Sport	Caruaru
16:00 (UTC-3)	Rodrigo Santos		Wilson,	Stadium: Estádio Luiz José de Lacerda (Lacerdão)

27 January 2010 5	Salgueiro	1–1	Sport	Salgueiro
21:00 (UTC-3)	Eider		Ciro 81'	Stadium: Estádio Cornélio de Barros (Salgueirão)

31 January 2010 6	Sport	1–1	Vera Cruz	Recife
16:00 (UTC-3)	Ciro		Éverton	Stadium: Estádio Adelmar da Costa Carvalho (Ilha do Retiro)

3 February 2010 7	Santa Cruz	1–3	Sport	Recife
20:30 (UTC-3)	Joelson		Ciro 38', Eduardo Ramos	Stadium: Estádio José do Rego Maciel (Arruda)

6 February 2010 8	Sport	2–0	Cabense	Recife
16:00 (UTC-3)	Nádson,			Stadium: Estádio Adelmar da Costa Carvalho (Ilha do Retiro)

10 February 2010 9	Ypiranga	1–1	Sport	Santa Cruz do Capibaribe
20:30 (UTC-3)	Fabrício Ceará		Ciro	Stadium: Estádio Otávio Limeira Alves

17 February 2010 10	Sete de Setembro	2–2	Sport	Garanhuns
21:00 (UTC-3)	Diego; Jardel		Juninho Silva; Júlio César	Stadium: Estádio Marco Antônio Maciel

20 February 2010 11	Sport	1–1	Náutico	Recife
17:00 (UTC-3)	Wilson		Hamílton 58'	Stadium: Estádio Adelmar da Costa Carvalho (Ilha do Retiro)

28 February 2010 12	Araripina	0–3	Sport	Araripina
16:00 (UTC-3)			Dairo 5', Igor	Stadium: Estádio Gilson Tiburtino de Souza (Chapadão do Araripe)

3 March 2010 13	Sport	4–2	Vitória das Tabocas	Recife
20:30 (UTC-3)	Dairo 8'; Eduardo Ratinho; Ciro 14' (pen.), 59'		Alex 51'; Jadilson 77'	Stadium: Estádio Adelmar da Costa Carvalho (Ilha do Retiro)

7 March 2010 14	Porto	0–4	Sport	Caruaru
16:00 (UTC-3)			Eduardo Ramos,, Ciro	Stadium: Estádio Luiz José de Lacerda (Lacerdão)

14 March 2010 15	Sport	2–0	Central	Recife
16:00 (UTC-3)	Ciro 12'; Eduardo Ramos (pen.)			Stadium: Estádio Adelmar da Costa Carvalho (Ilha do Retiro)

20 March 2010 16	Sport	2–1	Salgueiro	Recife
17:00 (UTC-3)	Dairo; Ciro		Vitor Caicó	Stadium: Estádio Adelmar da Costa Carvalho (Ilha do Retiro)

24 March 2010 17	Vera Cruz	0–2	Sport	Vitória de Santo Antão
21:50 (UTC-3)			Dairo; Eduardo Ramos	Stadium: Estádio Municipal Severino Cândido Carneiro

28 March 2010 18	Sport	2–0	Santa Cruz	Recife
16:00 (UTC-3)	Ciro; Eduardo Ramos (pen.)			Stadium: Estádio Adelmar da Costa Carvalho (Ilha do Retiro)

4 April 2010 19	Cabense	1–3	Sport	Cabo de Santo Agostinho
17:00 (UTC-3)	Flávio Caça-Rato		Leandrão, Júlio César (pen.)	Stadium: Estádio Gileno de Carli

7 April 2010 20	Sport	2–2	Ypiranga	Recife
19:00 (UTC-3)	Luís Eduardo 2' (o.g.); Ricardinho		Luís Eduardo; Fabrício Ceará (pen.)	Stadium: Estádio Adelmar da Costa Carvalho (Ilha do Retiro)

11 April 2010 21	Sport	1–0	Sete de Setembro	Recife
17:00 (UTC-3)	Eduardo Ramos			Stadium: Estádio Adelmar da Costa Carvalho (Ilha do Retiro)

18 April 2010 22	Náutico	2–0	Sport	Recife
17:00 (UTC-3)	Carlinhos Bala (pen.); Bruno Meneghel			Stadium: Estádio Eládio de Barros Carvalho (Aflitos)

==== Semi-finals ====
25 April 2010	Central	0–3	Sport	Caruaru
16:00 (UTC-3)			Julio César 34'; Ciro 81'; Eduardo Ramos 84'	Stadium: Estádio Luiz José de Lacerda (Lacerdão)

28 April 2010	Sport	1–0	Central	Recife
20:30 (UTC-3)	Levi 55'			Stadium: Estádio Adelmar da Costa Carvalho (Ilha do Retiro)

==== Finals ====
2 May 2010	Náutico	3–2	Sport	Recife
21:00 (UTC-3)	Rodrigo Dantas 10'; Bruno Meneghel 26'; Carlinhos Bala 55'		Zé Antônio 66'; Tobi 71'	Stadium: Estádio Eládio de Barros Carvalho (Aflitos); Attendance: 18,052; Referee: Marcelo de Lima Henrique

5 May 2010	Sport	1–0	Náutico	Recife
20:30 (UTC-3)	Leandrão 28'			Stadium: Estádio Adelmar da Costa Carvalho (Ilha do Retiro); Referee: Alicio Pena Júnior

==== Record ====
Final Position	Points	Matches	Wins	Draws	Losses	Goals For	Goals Away	Avg%
1st	60	26	18	6	2	54	21	77%

=== Copa do Brasil ===
==== First round ====
24 February 2010	Brasília	2–4	Sport	Gama
21:50 (UTC-3)	Gauchinho 15', 60'	Report	Ciro 23', 68'; Eduardo Ramos 28', 65'	Stadium: Estádio Walmir Campelo Bezerra (Bezerrão)

==== Second round ====
17 March 2010	Paraná	1–1	Sport	Recife
21:50 (UTC-3)	Marcelo Toscano 4'	Report	Tobi 24'	Stadium: Estádio Durival Britto e Silva (Vila Capanema); Referee: Flávio Rodrigues Guerra

31 March 2010	Sport	1–0	Paraná	Recife
21:00 (UTC-3)	Dirley 39'	Report		Stadium: Estádio Adelmar da Costa Carvalho (Ilha do Retiro); Referee: Arilson Bispo da Anunciação

==== Round of 16 ====
14 April 2010	Atlético Mineiro	1–0	Sport	Belo Horizonte
21:50 (UTC-3)	Fabiano 43'	Report		Stadium: Estádio Governador Magalhães Pinto (Mineirão); Attendance: 17,153; Referee: Sandro Meira Ricci

21 April 2010	Sport	0–2	Atlético Mineiro	Recife
21:50 (UTC-3)		Report	Muriqui 20'; Diego Tardelli 39'	Stadium: Estádio Adelmar da Costa Carvalho (Ilha do Retiro); Referee: Djalma José Beltrami Teixeira

==== Record ====
Final Position	Points	Matches	Wins	Draws	Losses	Goals For	Goals Away	Avg%
16th	7	5	2	1	2	6	6	46%

=== Série B ===
8 May 2010 1	Brasiliense	2–1	Sport	Taguatinga
16:10 (UTC-3)	Santiago 15'; Aloísio 84'	Report	Daniel Paulista 40'	Stadium: Elmo Serejo Farias Stadium (Boca do Jacaré); Referee: Arnoldo Vasconcelos Figarela

11 May 2010 2	Sport	1–1	Guaratinguetá	Recife
21:00 (UTC-3)	Zé Antônio 88'	Report	Lúcio Flávio 73'	Stadium: Estádio Adelmar da Costa Carvalho (Ilha do Retiro); Referee: Ricardo Marques Ribeiro

22 May 2010 3	ASA	4–1	Sport	Arapiraca
16:10 (UTC-3)	Didira 3'; Júnio Viçosa 20'; Ciel 66', 84'	Report	Pedro Júnior 33'	Stadium: Estádio Municipal Coaracy da Mata Fonseca; Referee: Jailson Macedo Freitas

25 May 2010 4	Sport	1–2	Icasa	Recife
21:50 (UTC-3)	Ciro 89'	Report	Everaldo 33'; Marcos Vinícius 47'	Stadium: Estádio Adelmar da Costa Carvalho (Ilha do Retiro); Referee: Rogério Lima da Rocha

29 May 2010 5	Bahia	2–0	Sport	Salvador
16:10 (UTC-3)	Rogerinho 31'; Ávine 51'	Report		Stadium: Estádio Governador Roberto Santos (Pituaçu); Referee: Djalma José Beltrami Teixeira

1 June 2010 6	Sport	1–0	Paraná	Recife
21:00 (UTC-3)	Ciro 3'	Report		Stadium: Estádio Adelmar da Costa Carvalho (Ilha do Retiro); Referee: Francisco de Assis Almeida Filho

5 June 2010 7	América–RN	0–5	Sport	Natal
16:10 (UTC-3)		Report	Ciro 23', 59', 65'; Adriano Pimenta 87'; Moisés 90+2'	Stadium: Estádio Dr. João Cláudio Vasconcelos Machado (Machadão); Attendance: 8,073; Referee: João Bosco Sátiro da Nóbrega

13 July 2010 8	Ipatinga	1–3	Sport	Ipatinga
19:30 (UTC-3)	Leonardo 55'	Report	Eduardo Ramos 5'; Ciro 22'; Mateus 86'	Stadium: Estádio Municipal João Lamego Netto (Ipatingão); Referee: Devarly Lira do Rosário

17 July 2010 9	Sport	1–1	Ponte Preta	Recife
16:10 (UTC-3)	Zé Antônio 81'	Report	Reis 5'	Stadium: Estádio Adelmar da Costa Carvalho (Ilha do Retiro)

24 July 2010 10	Coritiba	2–1	Sport	Joinville
16:10 (UTC-3)	Betinho 15'; Marcos Aurélio 79'	Report	Eduardo Ratinho 86'	Stadium: Arena Joinville; Referee: Fabricio Neves Correa

27 July 2010 11	Sport	1–2	Duque de Caxias	Recife
21:00 (UTC-3)	Ciro 34'	Report	Alexandro 64' (pen.); Danilo Rios 76'	Stadium: Estádio Adelmar da Costa Carvalho (Ilha do Retiro); Referee: Claudio Francisco Lima e Silva

7 August 2010 12	Náutico	1–1	Sport	Recife
16:10 (UTC-3)	Élton 13'	Report	Ciro 4'	Stadium: Estádio Eládio de Barros Carvalho (Aflitos); Referee: Cláudio Mercante

10 August 2010 13	Sport	2–1	Figueirense	Recife
21:00 (UTC-3)	Ciro 70' (pen.); Dairo 75'	Report	Jeovânio 43'	Stadium: Estádio Adelmar da Costa Carvalho (Ilha do Retiro); Referee: Francisco Carlos Nascimento

14 August 2010 14	Bragantino	0–0	Sport	Bragança Paulista
16:10 (UTC-3)		Report		Stadium: Estádio Nabi Abi Chedid; Attendance: 1,120; Referee: Antônio Hora Filho

17 August 2010 15	Sport	4–1	São Caetano	Recife
21:00 (UTC-3)	Ciro 12', 90+1'; Marcelinho Paraíba 15'; Dairo 42'	Report	Eduardo 69' (pen.)	Stadium: Estádio Adelmar da Costa Carvalho (Ilha do Retiro); Referee: Marcos André da Penha

24 August 2010 16	Sport	0–0	Vila Nova	Recife
21:00 (UTC-3)		Report		Stadium: Estádio Adelmar da Costa Carvalho (Ilha do Retiro); Referee: Italo Medeiros de Azevedo

28 August 2010 17	Santo André	2–2	Sport	Santo André
15:50 (UTC-3)	Alê 53'; Nando 85'	Report	Igor 19'; Ciro 38'	Stadium: Estádio Municipal Bruno José Daniel; Referee: Antonio Neuriclaudio Costa

31 August 2010 18	Sport	1–0	América–MG	Recife
21:00 (UTC-3)	Montoya 57'	Report		Stadium: Estádio Adelmar da Costa Carvalho (Ilha do Retiro); Referee: Wagner dos Santos Rosa

4 September 2010 19	Portuguesa	1–2	Sport	São Paulo
15:50 (UTC-3)	Thiago Gomes 38'	Report	Ciro 59'; Wilson 68'	Stadium: Estádio Oswaldo Teixeira Duarte (Canindé); Referee: João Batista de Arruda

7 September 2010 20	Sport	3–0	Brasiliense	Recife
16:10 (UTC-3)	Germano 23'; Eliandro 78'; Wilson 80'	Report		Stadium: Estádio Adelmar da Costa Carvalho (Ilha do Retiro); Attendance: 30,073; Referee: Rodrigo Martins Cintra

11 September 2010 21	Guaratinguetá	0–1	Sport	Guaratinguetá
15:50 (UTC-3)		Report	Marcelinho Paraíba 25'	Stadium: Estádio Municipal Professor Dario Rodrigues Leite (Ninho da Garça); Attendance: 2,714; Referee: Marcelo de Lima Henrique

18 September 2010 22	Sport	2–0	ASA	Recife
18:30 (UTC-3)	Marcelinho Paraíba 23' (pen.); Igor 65'	Report		Stadium: Estádio Adelmar da Costa Carvalho (Ilha do Retiro); Referee: Marocs Mateus Pereira

21 September 2010 23	Icasa	0–0	Sport	Juazeiro do Norte
21:50 (UTC-3)		Report		Stadium: Estádio Mauro Sampaio (Romeirão); Referee: Ricardo Marques Ribeiro

25 September 2010 24	Sport	1–2	Bahia	Recife
15:50 (UTC-3)	Daniel Paulista 44'	Report	Diego Corrêa 5'; Morais 67'	Stadium: Estádio Adelmar da Costa Carvalho (Ilha do Retiro); Referee: Wallace Nascimento Valente

28 September 2010 25	Paraná	0–2	Sport	Curitiba
21:50 (UTC-3)		Report	Wilson 24' (pen.); André Leone 33'	Stadium: Estádio Durival Britto e Silva (Vila Capanema); Attendance: 1,964; Referee: Rodrigo Braghetto

1 October 2010 26	Sport	3–0	América–RN	Recife
21:00 (UTC-3)	Germano 28'; Wilson 38'; Ciro 81'	Report		Stadium: Estádio Adelmar da Costa Carvalho (Ilha do Retiro); Attendance: 19,986; Referee: Felipe Gomes da Silva

8 October 2010 27	Sport	0–1	Ipatinga	Recife
16:00 (UTC-3)		Report	Alessandro 6' (pen.)	Stadium: Estádio Adelmar da Costa Carvalho (Ilha do Retiro); Attendance: 22,488; Referee: Heber Roberto Lopes

12 October 2010 28	Ponte Preta	3–1	Sport	Campinas
21:00 (UTC-3)	Kieza 35'; William 56'; Ivo 58'	Report	Élton 48'	Stadium: Estádio Moisés Lucarelli; Attendance: 3,697; Referee: Djalma José Beltrami Teixeira

16 October 2010 29	Sport	3–2	Coritiba	Recife
16:00 (UTC-3)	Marcelinho Paraíba 34' (pen.), 60' (pen.); Ciro 72'	Report	Leonardo 66'; Marcos Aurélio 77'	Stadium: Estádio Adelmar da Costa Carvalho (Ilha do Retiro); Referee: Jaílson Macedo Freitas

19 October 2010 30	Duque de Caxias	1–3	Sport	Rio de Janeiro
21:50 (UTC-3)	Geovane Maranhão 75'	Report	Wilson 8'; Dadá 27'; Ciro 51'	Stadium: Estádio Vasco da Gama (São Januário); Referee: Alício Pena Júnior

23 October 2010 31	Sport	1–1	Náutico	Recife
17:00 (UTC-3)	Romerito 71'	Report	Bruno Meneghel 47'	Stadium: Estádio Adelmar da Costa Carvalho (Ilha do Retiro); Referee: Niélson Nogueira Dias

30 October 2010 32	Figueirense	0–0	Sport	Florianópolis
16:00 (UTC-3)		Report		Stadium: Estádio Orlando Scarpelli; Referee: Sálvio Spinola Fagundes Filho

2 November 2010 33	Sport	2–0	Bragantino	Recife
19:30 (UTC-3)	Tobi 67'; Romerito 72'	Report		Stadium: Estádio Adelmar da Costa Carvalho (Ilha do Retiro); Attendance: 21,009

6 November 2010 34	São Caetano	2–1	Sport	São Caetano do Sul
17:00 (UTC-3)	Éverton Ribeiro 48'; Eduardo 90'	Report	Wilson 34'	Stadium: Estádio Municipal Anacleto Campanella; Attendance: 1,139; Referee: Márcio Chagas da Silva

9 November 2010 35	Vila Nova	1–1	Sport	Goiânia
19:30 (UTC-3)	Max Pardalzinho 52'		Marcelinho Paraíba 35'	Stadium: Estádio do Governo do Estado de Goiás (Serra Dourada)

12 November 2010 36	Sport	1–1	Santo André	Recife
21:00 (UTC-3)	Wilson 9'	Report	Rychely 40'	Stadium: Estádio Adelmar da Costa Carvalho (Ilha do Retiro); Attendance: 16,351; Referee: Gutemberg de Paula Fonseca

20 November 2010 37	América–MG	2–1	Sport	Sete Lagoas
17:00 (UTC-3)	Fábio Júnior 6'; Dudu 35'	Report	Dairo 77'	Stadium: Estádio Joaquim Henrique Nogueira (Arena do Jacaré); Attendance: 13,505; Referee: Djalma José Beltrami Teixeira

27 November 2010 38	Sport	1–2	Portuguesa	Recife
17:00 (UTC-3)	Fabrício 79'	Report	Dodô 17'; Marco Antônio 44'	Stadium: Estádio Adelmar da Costa Carvalho (Ilha do Retiro); Attendance: 4,301; Referee: Heber Roberto Lopes

==== Record ====
Final Position	Points	Matches	Wins	Draws	Losses	Goals For	Goals Away	Avg%
6th	56	38	15	11	12	55	41	49%
