= Maranhão (disambiguation) =

Maranhão is a northeastern state of Brazil.

Maranhão may also refer to:

== Places ==
- State of Maranhão (colonial), a 17th-18th century administrative division of the Portuguese Empire in South America
- Captaincy of Maranhão, a 2nd level 17th century administrative subdivision of the Portuguese Empire in South America
- Maranhão Island or São Luís Island, in Brazil
- Maranhão mangroves, a mangrove ecoregion of northern Brazil
- Maranhão River, a river of Goiás state in central Brazil

== People ==
- Maranhão (footballer, 1942-2007), full name José Ribamar Celestino, Brazilian football midfielder
- Maranhão (footballer, born 1985), full name Manoel Messias Barbosa da Silva, Brazilian football right back for Boa Esporte
- Maranhão (footballer, born 1990), full name Francinilson Santos Meirelles, Brazilian football attacking midfielder for Ponte Preta
- Marques do Maranhão (1775–1860), Admiral Thomas Cochrane, 10th Earl of Dundonald, British naval flag officer, mercenary and politician
- Alex Maranhão (born 1985), Brazilian footballer for Criciúma
- Geovane Maranhão (born 1966), Brazilian football striker for Al Hilal EC
- Jefferson Maranhão (born 1993), Brazilian football attacking midfielder for Jacuipense on loan from Santa Cruz
- Joanna Maranhão (born 1987), Brazilian swimmer
- José Maranhão (1933–2021), Brazilian politician, former governor of Paraíba
- Júnior Maranhão (born 1985), Brazilian footballer
- Lúcio Maranhão (born 1988), Brazilian football forward for Elazığspor
- Waldir Maranhão (born 1955), Brazilian politician for the Progressive Party

== Other uses ==
- Maranhão Atlético Clube, a Brazilian football club from São Luís, Maranhão state
- Maranhao hermit, the cinnamon-throated hermit or related birds
- Maranhão red-handed howler, a species of monkey endemic to forests in Brazil
- Maranhão slider, a species of turtle in the family Emydidae
- Marquess of Maranhão, a title of the Earl of Dundonald
