= Enílton =

Brazilian footballer (born 1977)

Personal information
- Full name: Enílton Menezes de Miranda
- Date of birth: 11 October 1977 (age 49)
- Place of birth: Campo Grande, Rio de Janeiro, Brazil
- Height: 1.76 m (5 ft 9 in)
- Position: Second striker

Senior career*
Years	Team	Apps	(Gls)
1996–1997	Boavista-RJ		
1997–1998	Sion		
1998–2000	→ Yverdon (loan)		
2000	Sion		
2000–2001	Yverdon		
2001	Coritiba	14	(3)
2002	Tigres	23	(1)
2003	Atlético Mineiro	2	(0)
2003–2005	Vitória EC	16	(1)
2005	→ Juventude (loan)	25	(17)
2006–2009	Palmeiras	26	(8)
2007	→ Omiya Ardija (loan)	11	(0)
2007	→ Vasco (loan)	9	(1)
2008	→ Sport Recife (loan)	0	(21)
2009	→ Paulista FC (loan)	0	(0)
2010	Paysandu	0	(0)
2010	Brasiliense	10	(3)
2012	Bangu	0	(0)
2012	Comercial (RP)	0	(0)
- * Club domestic league appearances and goals

Enílton Menezes Miranda (born 11 October 1977) is a Brazilian footballer. In 2012 he was playing for Comercial as a striker.

== Biography ==
Enílton was signed by Tigres UANL for US$1 million in 2002 from Coritiba and third parties owner "Planet Shorts". He unilaterally breach his contract with Tigres in order to return to Brazil for Atlético Mineiro. He signed a 1-year contract on 9 May 2003 but sold to Esporte Clube Vitória on 28 July 2003, in 3-year deal. Tigres sued Enílton to FIFA and then the Court of Arbitration for Sport, which the court awarded Tigres shall eligible to receive US$750,000 from Enílton, with Mineiro jointly responsible for breach of contract.

In December 2005 Enílton was signed by Palmeiras in 3-year contract. From 2007 to 2009 he spent his Palmeiras career on loan to other clubs. He also extended his contract in February 2008, to last until 31 December 2009. He spent the first half of 2009 at Paulista FC.

In January 2010 he was signed by Paysandu; he was signed by Brasiliense in March, until the end of 2011 League of Brazilian Federal District in May 2011. In January 2011 he was released again.

In January 2012 Enílton was signed by Bangu until the end of Rio de Janeiro state league. In February 2012 he was signed by Comercial de Ribeirão Preto.

== Club statistics ==
Club performance			League	
Season	Club	League	Apps	Goals
Switzerland			League	
1998/99	Yverdon-Sport	Nationalliga B	9	1
1999/00	Yverdon-Sport	Nationalliga A	18	4
1999/00	Sion	Nationalliga B	13	8
2000/01	Sion	Nationalliga A	14	4
Brazil			League	
2001	Coritiba	Série A	14	3
Mexico			League	
2002/03	Tigres UANL	Primera División	23	1
Brazil			League	
2003	Atlético Mineiro	Série A	2	0
2003	Vitória	Série A	10	0
2004	Vitória	Série A	7	1
2005	Juventude	Série A	25	17
2006	Palmeiras	Série A	26	8
Japan			League	
2007	Omiya Ardija	J1 League	11	0
Brazil			League	
2007	Vasco da Gama	Série A	9	1
2008	Sport Recife	Série A	21	0
Country	Switzerland		54	17
Country	Brazil			
Country	Mexico		23	1
Country	Japan		11	0
Total				

== Honours ==
Vitória

- Campeonato Baiano: 2004

Sport

- Campeonato Pernambucano: 2008
- Copa do Brasil: 2008
