= Serrano Futebol Clube =

Serrano Futebol Clube may refer to:

- Serrano Futebol Clube (PE), Brazilian football in Pernambuco state
- Serrano Football Club, Brazilian football in Rio state
