= Diogo (footballer, born 1984) =

Brazilian footballer

Personal information
- Full name: Diogo Douglas Santos Andrade Barbosa
- Date of birth: 18 December 1984 (age 41)
- Place of birth: Estância, Brazil
- Height: 1.73 m (5 ft 8 in)
- Position: Right back

Team information
- Current team: Oeste

Senior career*
Years	Team	Apps	(Gls)
2004	Sergipe	0	(0)
2005	Mogi Mirim	7	(0)
2006	Monte Azul	0	(0)
2006	Confiança	8	(0)
2007	Porto (PE)	0	(0)
2007–2008	Sport Recife	32	(1)
2008–2010	Corinthians	18	(0)
2009–2010	→ Bahia (loan)	3	(0)
2010	→ Ceará (loan)	4	(0)
2010	→ Grêmio Prudente (loan)	0	(0)
2011	São Caetano	0	(0)
2012	Santa Cruz	9	(0)
2013–	Oeste		
- * Club domestic league appearances and goals

Diogo Douglas Santos Andrade Barbosa (born 18 December 1984), known as just Diogo, is a Brazilian footballer.

== Biography ==
=== Brasileiro Série C ===
Born in Estância, Sergipe state, Diogo started his career at Club Sportivo Sergipe. In December 2004 he was signed by Mogi Mirim and later extended his contract until 31 December 2005. After a season in 2005 Campeonato Paulista and 2005 Campeonato Brasileiro Série C, he left for Monte Azul of 2006 Campeonato Paulista Série A3. In May, he returned to Sergipe for Confiança for 2006 Campeonato Brasileiro Série C.

=== Sport Recife & Corinthians ===
In December 2006 he was signed by Clube Atlético do Porto in 3-year contract, but after 2007 Campeonato Pernambucano, he was signed by Sport Recife in April, which he made his debut in the top division, winning 2008 Campeonato Pernambucano and 2008 Copa do Brasil.

In September 2008 he was signed by second division side Corinthians, via Brasa, which the lower division club retained 50% economic rights on Diogo for investor.

On 31 August 2009 he was signed by Bahia until May 2010. In March 2010, he was signed by Ceará until December 2010. He suffered from injury and only played 4 games in Série A. In September, he left for Grêmio Prudente but did not play.

In January 2011 his contract with Corinthians was terminated. In February, he was signed by São Caetano until the end of 2011 Campeonato Paulista.

== Career statistics ==
Club performance			League		Cup		League Cup		Total	
Season	Club	League	Apps	Goals	Apps	Goals	Apps	Goals	Apps	Goals
Brazil			League		Copa do Brasil		League Cup		Total	
2004	Sergipe	Série C	0	0	0	0	?	?	?	?
2005	Mogi Mirim	Série C	7	0			?	?	?	?
2006	Monte Azul	Nil					?	?	?	?
2006	Confiança	Série C	8	0					8	0
2007	Porto (PE)	Série C	0	0			?	?	?	?
2007	Sport Recife	Série A	21	1					21	1
2008	Sport Recife	Série A	11	0	4	0	?	?	?	?
2008	Corinthians	Série B	4	0					4	0
2009	Corinthians	Série A	14	0	0	0	7	1	21	1
2009	Bahia	Série B	3	0					3	0
2010	Ceará	Série A	4	0	0	0	6	1	10	1
2010	Grêmio Prudente	Série A	0	0					0	0
2011	São Caetano	Série B	0	0			4	0	4	0
Career total			72	1	4	0	?	?	?	?

Note

- State leagues were marked as League Cup

== Honours ==
national

- Copa do Brasil (2) in 2008 with Sport Club do Recife; 2009 with Sport Club Corinthians Paulista
- Campeonato Brasileiro Série B in 2008 with Sport Club Corinthians Paulista

state

- Campeonato Paulista in 2011 with Sport Club Corinthians Paulista
- Campeonato Pernambucano in 2008 with Sport Club do Recife
