= Alexandre (footballer, born 1978) =

Brazilian footballer

Personal information
- Full name: Alexandre Rodriguez de Oliveira
- Date of birth: 23 January 1978 (age 48)
- Place of birth: Recife, Brazil
- Position: Midfielder

Senior career*
Years	Team	Apps	(Gls)
- Sport Club Internacional
- Serrano Futebol Clube
- Sport Club do Recife
- Clube Náutico Capibaribe
- Associação Portuguesa de Desportos
- Santa Cruz Futebol Clube
2008	Universitatea Cluj	0	(0)
- * Club domestic league appearances and goals

Alexandre Rodriguez de Oliveira (born 23 January 1978) is a Brazilian former football player.
