= Fábio Gomes =

Fábio Gomes may refer to:

- Fábio Gomes (footballer, born 1981), Brazilian footballer
- Fábio Gomes (footballer, born 1988), Portuguese footballer
- Fábio Gomes (pole vaulter) (born 1983), Brazilian pole vaulter
- Fábio Gomes (footballer, born 1997), Brazilian footballer
