= Roger (footballer, born 1985) =

Brazilian footballer (born 1985)

Roger Silva
- Roger with Atlético Goianiense in 2026

Personal information
- Full name: Roger Rodrigues da Silva
- Date of birth: 7 January 1985 (age 41)
- Place of birth: Campinas, Brazil
- Height: 1.84 m (6 ft 0 in)
- Position: Striker

Team information
- Current team: Atlético Goianiense (head coach)

Youth career
- Ponte Preta

Senior career*
Years	Team	Apps	(Gls)
2003–2005	Ponte Preta	59	(18)
2005–2010	São Paulo	30	(6)
2006	→ Palmeiras (loan)	16	(2)
2007	→ Ponte Preta (loan)	16	(3)
2007–2008	→ Al-Nasr (loan)	9	(7)
2008	→ Sport Recife (loan)	28	(11)
2009	→ Fluminense (loan)	11	(3)
2009	→ Vitória (loan)	31	(15)
2010	→ Guarani (loan)	6	(6)
2010–2011	Kashiwa Reysol	14	(3)
2011	→ Ceará (loan)	10	(2)
2012	Ponte Preta	39	(13)
2013	Sport Recife	19	(7)
2013	Atlético Paranaense	14	(3)
2014	Suwon Bluewings	32	(7)
2015	Chapecoense	22	(11)
2015	Bahia	9	(3)
2016	Red Bull Brasil	15	(11)
2016	Ponte Preta	26	(8)
2017	Botafogo	30	(14)
2018	Internacional	10	(2)
2018–2019	Corinthians	21	(4)
2019	Ceará	8	(3)
2019–2020	Ponte Preta	44	(18)
2020	Operário Ferroviário	8	(1)
2021	Inter de Limeira	12	(2)
Total		539	(183)

Managerial career
- 2021: Inter de Limeira (interim)
- 2022: Athletic
- 2022: Inter de Limeira
- 2023: Athletic
- 2023: Pouso Alegre
- 2023: Manaus
- 2024: Primavera
- 2024–2025: Athletic
- 2025: Londrina
- 2026: Sport Recife
- 2026: América Mineiro
- 2026–: Atlético Goianiense
- * Club domestic league appearances and goals

Roger Rodrigues da Silva (born 7 January 1985), simply known as Roger, is a Brazilian football coach and former player who played as a striker.

== Playing career ==
Born in Campinas, São Paulo, Roger was a Ponte Preta youth graduate, making his first team debut in 2003. Despite not being a regular starter in his first two years, he established himself as a first-choice during the 2005 Campeonato Paulista, where he was his club's top scorer with nine goals.

On 25 May 2005, Roger joined São Paulo for a rumoured fee of US$ 1.2 million. He won the 2005 Copa Libertadores with the club, but only featured in one match during the competition.

On 18 May 2006, Roger moved on loan to Palmeiras, with Lúcio moving in the opposite direction. On 1 March 2007, he returned to Ponte also in a temporary deal.

On 7 March 2008, after a brief spell at Al-Nasr, Roger agreed to a loan deal with Sport Recife until the end of the year. He won the year's Campeonato Pernambucano and the 2008 Copa do Brasil with the side, but left after failing to agree new terms.

On 7 January 2009, Roger moved to Fluminense on loan, as a part of the deal which saw Arouca move to São Paulo. He left the club on 27 April after terminating his loan deal, and joined Vitória also in a temporary deal.

On 7 May 2010, after playing the 2010 Campeonato Paulista with São Paulo, Roger was loaned to Guarani. He immediately became a regular starter, scoring six goals in his first six matches, but was sold to Japanese side Kashiwa Reysol in July.

Roger returned to his home country on 17 July 2011, after signing a contract with Ceará. He returned to Ponte the following 26 January, and scored 16 goals during the season as they avoided relegation.

On 28 December 2012, Roger returned to Sport after four years. He left for Atlético Paranaense on 11 September 2013, but moved to South Korean side Suwon Samsung Bluewings after the season ended.

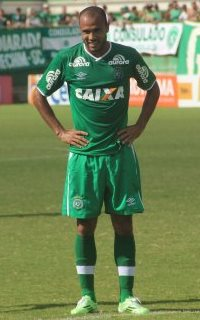
Roger playing for Chapecoense in 2015

On 24 December 2014, Roger agreed to a deal with Chapecoense for the upcoming campaign. He signed for Bahia the following 11 September, before moving to Red Bull Brasil on 13 January 2016.

Roger was the top scorer of the 2016 Campeonato Paulista with 11 goals, and returned to Ponte for a third spell on 18 April 2016. On 1 November, he moved to Botafogo, and scored a career-best 17 goals during the year.

On 26 November 2017, Internacional announced the signing of Roger on a two-year deal. The following 20 April, however, he moved to Corinthians on a contract until the end of 2019.

On 24 January 2019, Roger returned to Ceará, but rescinded his link on 16 May to return to Ponte.

On 17 August 2020, Roger left Ponte to join Operário Ferroviário, but left the club in October. He agreed to a contract with Inter de Limeira on 1 December, before announcing his retirement on 1 May 2021 at the age of 35; he immediately became the director of football of his last club.

== Coaching career ==
On 4 August 2021, Roger became an interim head coach of Inter de Limeira, after Dyego Coelho was sacked. He left the club on 10 September, before being named head coach of Athletic-MG on 14 October.

Roger returned to Inter de Limeira on 4 April 2022, now as a permanent head coach. He left on 1 August after being knocked out of the year's Série D, and was announced back at Athletic on 5 October.

Roger left Athletic to take over Série C side Pouso Alegre on 19 March 2023, but was sacked on 3 July. He was named at the helm of fellow league team Manaus on 26 July, but left after suffering relegation with the club.

On 7 October 2023, Roger was announced as head coach of Uberlândia, but asked to rescind his contract eighteen days later, alleging personal problems. On 1 February 2024, he was appointed head coach of Primavera, replacing Ricardo Colbachini.

On 5 March 2024, Roger returned to Athletic in the place of Rodrigo Santana. He led the club to their first-ever promotion to the second division, and despite announcing his departure on 30 November, he signed a new one-year deal on 8 December.

On 2 June 2025, Roger resigned from Athletic, and took over Londrina five days later.

On 21 December 2025, after another promotion to the second division, Roger left Londrina and agreed to become the head coach of another club he represented as a player, Sport Recife. Despite winning the 2026 Campeonato Pernambucano, he was still sacked on 23 March of that year, and took over fellow second division side América Mineiro on 13 April.

On 30 May 2026, América announced Roger's departure by mutual consent, with the club in the relegation zone. On 7 July, he took over Atlético Goianiense of the same tier.

== Honours ==
=== Player ===
São Paulo

- Copa Libertadores: 2005

Sport Recife

- Campeonato Pernambucano: 2008
- Copa do Brasil: 2008

Individual

- Campeonato Paulista Team of the year: 2016

=== Coach ===
Sport Recife

- Campeonato Pernambucano: 2026
