= Zé Antônio =

Brazilian footballer

Personal information
- Full name: José Antônio Pereira
- Date of birth: March 19, 1984 (age 42)
- Place of birth: Monte Azul Paulista, Brazil
- Height: 1.80 m (5 ft 11 in)
- Position: Defensive midfielder

Youth career
- 2002–2003: Botafogo-SP

Senior career*
Years	Team	Apps	(Gls)
2004	Botafogo-SP		
2004–2008	Atlético Mineiro		
2007	→ BK Häcken (loan)	3	(2)
2008	→ Atlético Paranaense (loan)		
2008–2010	Atlético Paranaense	24	(1)
2009–2010	→ Sport Recife (loan)	29	(2)
2011	Goiás	6	(1)
2012–2013	Botafogo-SP	18	(3)
2012	→ Portuguesa (loan)	7	(0)
2013–2014	Paysandu	52	(2)
2015	América–RN	15	(2)
2016	Linense	14	(2)
2016	Guarani	8	(0)
2017	Linense	12	(1)
2017–2019	Figueirense	112	(4)
2020	Santo André	3	(0)
2021	Joinville	4	(0)
- * Club domestic league appearances and goals

José Antônio Pereira (born March 19, 1984, in Monte Azul Paulista), or simply Zé Antônio, is a Brazilian footballer, who plays as a midfielder.

== Career statistics ==
=== Club ===
As of 6 February 2017

Club	Season	League			State League		Cup		Continental		Other		Total	
Club	Season	Division	Apps	Goals	Apps	Goals	Apps	Goals	Apps	Goals	Apps	Goals	Apps	Goals
Atlético Paranaense	2008	Série A	11	1	—		—		—		—		11	1
Atlético Paranaense	2009	Série A	5	0	14	3	2	0	—		—		21	3
Atlético Paranaense	Subtotal		16	1	14	3	2	0	—		—		32	4
Sport	2009	Série A	7	0	—		—		—		—		7	0
Sport	2010	Série B	22	2	23	1	5	0	—		—		50	3
Sport	Subtotal		29	2	23	1	5	0	—		—		57	3
Goiás	2011	Série B	6	1	20	0	4	0	—		—		30	1
Portuguesa	2012	Série A	7	0	—		—		—		—		7	0
Botafogo–SP	2013	Série D	—		18	3	—		—		—		18	3
Paysandu	2013	Série B	32	0	—		2	1	—		—		34	1
Paysandu	2014	Série C	20	2	19	4	5	0	—		6 (Note: All appearance(s) in Copa Verde)	0	50	6
Paysandu	Subtotal		52	2	19	4	7	1	—		6	0	84	7
América–RN	2015	Série C	15	2	6	0	4	0	—		2 (Note: All appearance(s) in Copa do Nordeste)	0	27	2
Linense	2016	Série D	—		14	2	2	0	—		—		16	2
Guarani	2016	Série C	8	0	—		—		—		—		8	0
Linense	2017	Paulista	—		1	0	—		—		—		1	0
Career total			133	8	115	13	24	1	0	0	8	0	280	22

== Honours ==
- Brazilian League (2nd division): 2006
- Minas Gerais State League: 2007
- Campeonato Pernambucano in 2010 with Sport Recife
