= Igor (footballer, born 1979) =

Brazilian footballer

Personal information
- Full name: Igor Nascimento Soares
- Date of birth: August 3, 1979 (age 47)
- Place of birth: Ponta Grossa (PR), Brazil
- Height: 1.81 m (5 ft 11 in)
- Position: Central defender

Youth career
- 1997–1998: Nacional-SP
- 1999–2000: Atlético Paranaense

Senior career*
Years	Team	Apps	(Gls)
2000–2004	Atlético Paranaense		
2000	→ Ponta Grossa (loan)		
2005	Fluminense		
2006	Juventude		
2007	Botafogo		
2007–2011	Sport		
2012	Mirassol		
2012	Guaratinguetá		
2013	Botafogo-SP		
2013	Botafogo da Paraíba		
2014–2015	Botafogo-SP		
- * Club domestic league appearances and goals

Igor Nascimento Soares (born August 3, 1979), or simply Igor, is a Brazilian former football defender who played for Botafogo-SP in the Brazilian Série B.

== Honours ==
- Campeonato Brasileiro in 2001 with Atlético Paranaense
- Campeonato Paranaense in 2001 and 2002 with Atlético Paranaense
- Paraná Superleague in 2002 with Atlético Paranaense
- Campeonato Carioca in 2005 with Fluminense
- Campeonato Pernambucano in 2007, 2008, 2009 and 2010 with Sport Club do Recife
- Copa do Brasil in 2008 with Sport Club do Recife
- Campeonato Paraibano in 2014 with Botafogo da Paraíba
- Campeonato Brasileiro Série D in 2015 with Botafogo-SP

== Current contract ==
- October 10, 2008 to December 31, 2011
