= Vinícius (footballer, born 1977) =

Brazilian footballer

Personal information
- Full name: Vinícius Conceição da Silva
- Date of birth: March 7, 1977 (age 49)
- Place of birth: Porto Alegre, Brazil
- Height: 1.85 m (6 ft 1 in)
- Position: Central defender

Team information
- Current team: Caxias do Sul

Youth career
- 1994–1997: Internacional

Senior career*
Years	Team	Apps	(Gls)
1997–2001	Sporting CP		
2001–2002	Standard Liège		
2002	Fluminense		
2002–2005	Internacional	195	(8)
2005	Atlético Mineiro	14	(1)
2006	Ulsan Hyundai	18	(1)
2007–2008	Atlético Mineiro	13	(2)
2009	Bahia	7	(0)
2010	Náutico	11	(0)
2011	São José		
2011–	Caxias do Sul		
- * Club domestic league appearances and goals

Vinícius Conceição da Silva (born March 7, 1977, in Porto Alegre), or simply Vinícius, is a Brazilian central defender. He currently plays for Caxias do Sul.

== Honours ==
- Campeonato Gaúcho in 1997, 2003, 2004, 2005 with Internacional
- Primeira Liga Champion in 1999–2000 with Sporting Clube de Portugal
- Korean Super Cup Winner in 2006 with Ulsan Hyundai Horang-i
- Campeonato Mineiro in 2007 with Clube Atlético Mineiro
