= Vágner (footballer, born 1983) =

Brazilian footballer

Personal information
- Full name: Rafael Vágner Dias Silva
- Date of birth: June 9, 1983 (age 43)
- Place of birth: Betim, Brazil
- Height: 1.82 m (6 ft 0 in)
- Position: Central defender

Team information
- Current team: Santa Cruz
- Number: 33

Youth career
- 2000–2001: Atlético Mineiro

Senior career*
Years	Team	Apps	(Gls)
2002–2003	Atlético Mineiro	?	(?)
2004–2006	Coritiba	28	(3)
2007	Botafogo	7	(0)
2007–2008	Náutico	27	(0)
2010	Bahia	28	(0)
2011	Ipatinga	3	(0)
2011	Paysandu	8	(1)
2012	Guaratinguetá	7	(0)
2012–	Santa Cruz	40	(0)
- * Club domestic league appearances and goals

Rafael Vágner Dias Silva or simply Vágner (born June 9, 1983, in Betim), is a Brazilian footballer. He currently plays for Guaratinguetá Futebol.

== Honours ==
- Paraná State League 2004
- Rio de Janeiro's Cup: 2007

== Contract ==
1 February 2007 to 31 December 2008
