= Patrick (footballer, born 1983) =

Brazilian footballer

Personal information
- Full name: Patrick de Souza Conceição
- Date of birth: July 19, 1983 (age 43)
- Place of birth: Nova Iguaçu, Brazil
- Position: Right-back

Senior career*
Years	Team	Apps	(Gls)
2007–2011	Brasiliense		
2009	→ Náutico (loan)	21	(1)
2010	→ Itumbiara (loan)	0	(0)
2010	→ São Caetano (loan)	8	(0)
2011	Ceará	3	(0)
- * Club domestic league appearances and goals as of September 11, 2010

Patrick de Souza Conceicao (born July 19, 1983), or simply known as Patrick, is known as a Brazilian professional footballer who last played as a right-back for Ceará.
