= Magrão (footballer, born 1977) =

Brazilian footballer (born 1977)

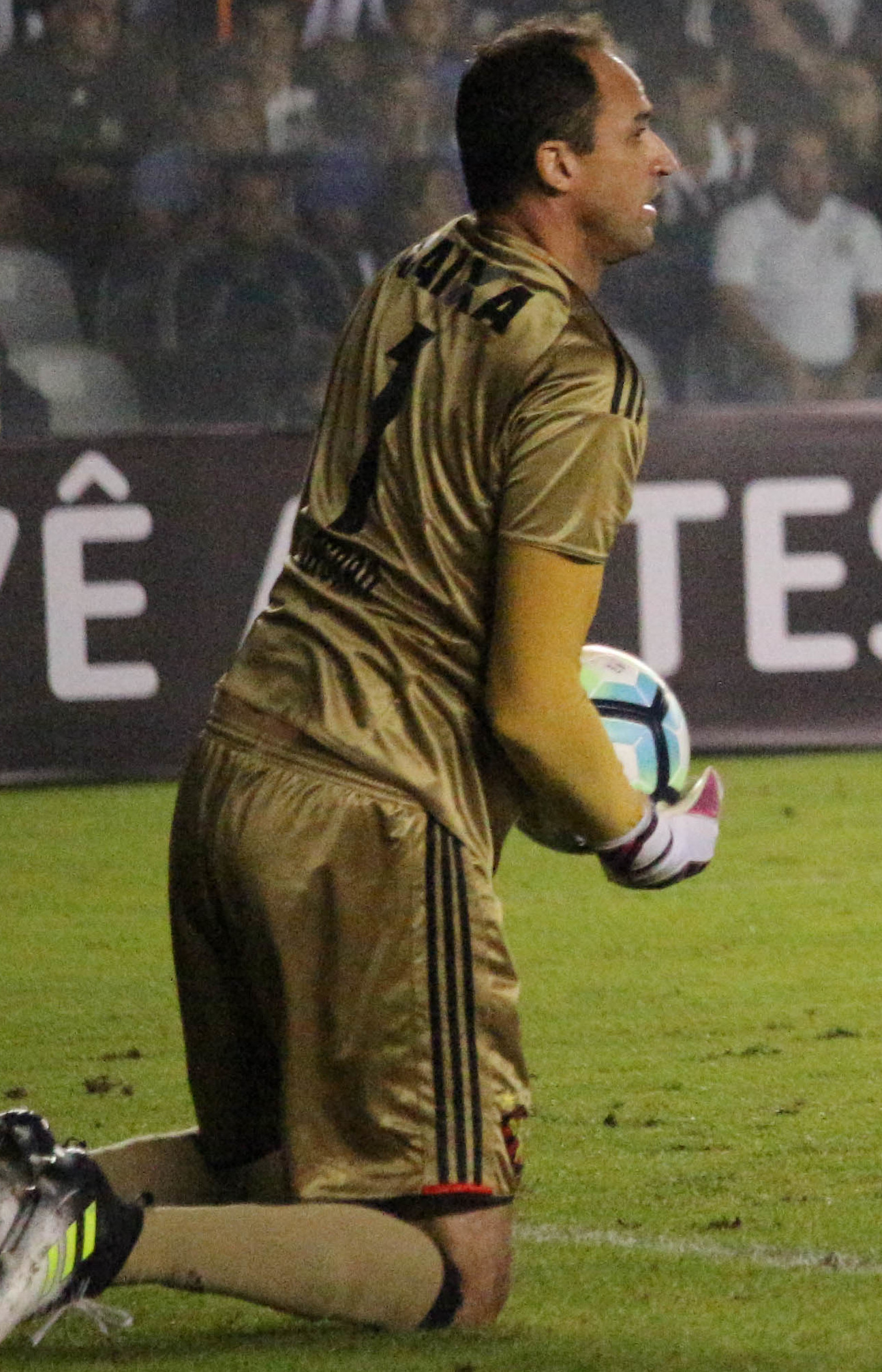
- Magrão in 2017

Personal information
- Full name: Alessandro Beti Rosa
- Date of birth: April 9, 1977 (age 49)
- Place of birth: São Paulo, Brazil
- Height: 1.87 m (6 ft 2 in)
- Position: Goalkeeper

Senior career*
Years	Team	Apps	(Gls)
2000	Nacional-SP	0	(0)
2001–2002	Botafogo-SP	7	(0)
2002	Portuguesa-SP	0	(0)
2003	Ceará	5	(0)
2004	Fortaleza	0	(0)
2005	Rio Branco-SP	0	(0)
2005–2019	Sport Recife	732	(0)
- * Club domestic league appearances and goals

Alessandro Beti Rosa (born April 9, 1977), better known as Magrão, is a Brazilian former professional football goalkeeper, who played for Sport Recife for 14 years.

== Career statistics ==
As of 31 January 2019

Appearances and goals by club, season and competition
Club	Season	League			National cup		Continental		Other		Total	
Club	Season	Division	Apps	Goals	Apps	Goals	Apps	Goals	Apps	Goals	Apps	Goals
Sport Recife	2005	Série A	13	0	0	0	0	0	0	0	13	0
Sport Recife	2006	Série A	35	0	0	0	0	0	0	0	35	0
Sport Recife	2007	Série A	26	0	0	0	0	0	23	0	49	0
Sport Recife	2008	Série A	36	0	2	0	0	0	0	0	38	0
Sport Recife	2009	Série A	37	0	0	0	8	0	0	0	45	0
Sport Recife	2010	Série B	37	0	5	0	0	0	0	0	42	0
Sport Recife	2011	Série B	30	0	2	0	0	0	5	0	37	0
Sport Recife	2012	Série A	26	0	3	0	0	0	0	0	29	0
Sport Recife	2013	Série B	36	0	4	0	3	0	11	0	54	0
Sport Recife	2014	Série A	38	0	1	0	2	0	19	0	60	0
Sport Recife	2015	Série A	2	0	3	0	2	0	20	0	27	0
Sport Recife	2016	Série A	34	0	1	0	2	0	3	0	40	0
Sport Recife	2017	Série A	35	0	8	0	8	0	20	0	71	0
Sport Recife	2018	Série A	24	0	2	0	0	0	12	0	38	0
Sport Recife	2019	Série B	0	0	0	0	0	0	3	0	3	0
Sport Recife	Total		409	0	31	0	25	0	110	0	580	0
Career total			409	0	31	0	25	0	113	0	580	0

== Honours ==
Sport Recife

- Campeonato Pernambucano: 2006, 2007, 2008, 2009, 2010, 2014, 2017, 2019
- Copa do Brasil: 2008
- Copa do Nordeste: 2014
