= Sandro Goiano (footballer, born 1973) =

Brazilian footballer

Personal information
- Full name: Sandro Gomes da Luz
- Date of birth: 6 August 1973 (age 53)
- Place of birth: Pirenópolis, Brazil
- Height: 1.81 m (5 ft 11 in)
- Position: Defensive midfielder

Youth career
- 1990–1993: Goiás

Senior career*
Years	Team	Apps	(Gls)
1994	Goiás		
1995	Caxias		
1996	Tuna Luso		
1997–1998	Paraná	15	(0)
1999	Caxias		
2000	Paraná		
2001–2005	Paysandu	102	(8)
2005–2007	Grêmio	47	(1)
2008–2009	Sport Recife	19	(0)
2010–2011	Paysandu	15	(1)
- * Club domestic league appearances and goals

Sandro Gomes da Luz or simply Sandro Goiano (born 6 August 1973), is a Brazilian former professional footballer who played as a defensive midfielder.
