= Luisinho Netto =

Brazilian footballer

Personal information
- Full name: Luís Idorildo Netto da Cunha
- Date of birth: April 6, 1974 (age 52)
- Place of birth: Cachoeira do Sul, Brazil
- Height: 1.86 m (6 ft 1 in)
- Position: Right-back

Youth career
- 1992–1995: Guarani-VA

Senior career*
Years	Team	Apps	(Gls)
1995	Joinville		
1996	São Paulo	2	(0)
1997–2001	Atlético-PR	39	(1)
2001–2003	Internacional	13	(0)
2004	Avaí		
2005	Marília		
2006	Atlético Mineiro		
2006	Criciúma		
2007	Atlético Mineiro		
2008	Sport		
2009	Itumbiara	1	(0)
2010	Mixto	0	(0)
- * Club domestic league appearances and goals

Luís Idorildo Netto da Cunha (born April 6, 1974), or simply Luisinho Netto, is a Brazilian former professional footballer who played as a right-back.
