= Jeovânio =

Brazilian footballer

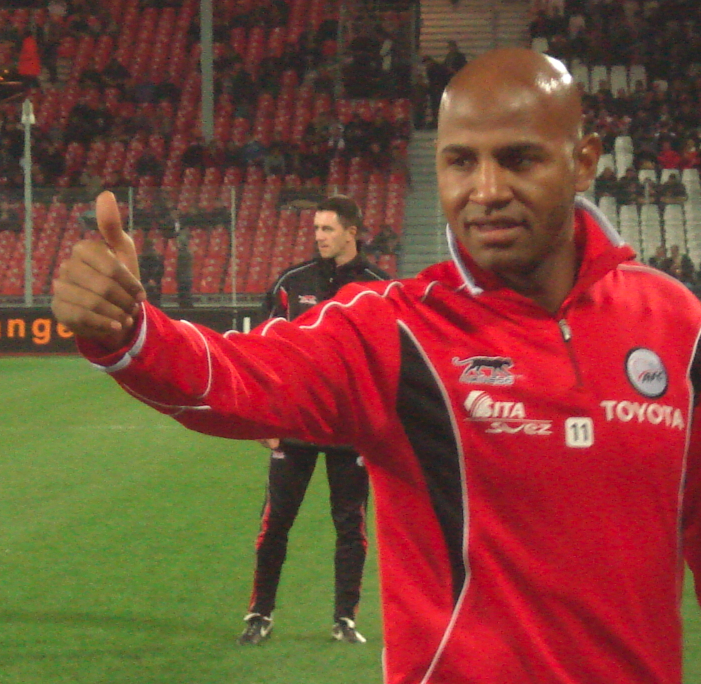

Personal information
- Full name: Jeovânio Rocha do Nascimento
- Date of birth: November 11, 1977 (age 48)
- Place of birth: Goiânia, Brazil
- Height: 1.73 m (5 ft 8 in)
- Position: Defensive midfielder

Youth career
- 1993–1994: Atlético-GO

Senior career*
Years	Team	Apps	(Gls)
1995–2000	Atlético-GO	-	(-)
2000	América-SP	-	(-)
2001	Figueirense	-	(-)
2002	Palmeiras	3	(0)
2003–2005	Figueirense	67	(0)
2006	→ Grêmio (loan)	28	(0)
2007–2009	Valenciennes FC	38	(0)
2009–2010	Figueirense	16	(1)
2011–2012	Santa Cruz	12	(0)
2012	Guaratinguetá		
- * Club domestic league appearances and goals

Jeovânio Rocha do Nascimento or simply Jeovânio (born November 11, 1977, in Goiânia, Brazil) is a Brazilian defensive midfielder.

== Career ==
Jeovânio made three appearances in the 2002 Campeonato Brasileiro Série A with Sociedade Esportiva Palmeiras.

On February 10, 2007 he made his Ligue 1 debut with Valenciennes against Nantes

== Judicial problems ==
In March 2016 he was sentenced to ten months in jail by a French court for failing to pay €142 000 in taxes while playing for Valenciennes FC
