= André Leone =

Brazilian footballer (born 1979)

Personal information
- Full name: André Augusto Leone
- Date of birth: 12 February 1979 (age 47)
- Place of birth: Vargem Grande do Sul, Brazil
- Height: 1.84 m (6 ft 0 in)
- Position: Centre back

Youth career
- Primavera-SP

Senior career*
Years	Team	Apps	(Gls)
1998–1999	Primavera-SP		
1999	União Barbarense		
2000	Campinas-SP		
2000–2001	Vicenza	0	(0)
2001–2002	Vasco Gama	2	(0)
2002–2003	Siena	0	(0)
2003–2004	Ituano		
2005	Goiás	35	(2)
2006	Cruzeiro	1	(0)
2006	Corinthians	4	(0)
2007	Goiás	25	(2)
2008	Vila Nova	7	(1)
2008–2010	Braga	28	(1)
2010–2011	Sport	12	(2)
2012	Guarani	17	(0)
2013	Rio Branco	6	(0)
2014	União Barbarense	4	(0)
Total		141	(8)
- * Club domestic league appearances and goals

André Augusto Leone (born 12 February 1979) is a Brazilian retired footballer who played as a central defender.

== Club career ==
Leone was born in Vargem Grande do Sul, São Paulo. From 2000 to 2008 he represented, in Brazil, Campinas-SP, CR Vasco da Gama, Ituano Futebol Clube, Goiás Esporte Clube (twice), Cruzeiro Esporte Clube, Sport Club Corinthians Paulista and Vila Nova Futebol Clube.

During that timeframe, Leone also had abroad stints with Vicenza Calcio and A.C. Siena in Italy. After failing to appear for either side, he joined S.C. Braga of Portugal for the 2008–09 season, playing more than initially expected in his first year due to longtime injuries to habitual starters Paulo Jorge and Alberto Rodríguez. He also managed to score in the 3–0 home win against Standard Liège for the round of 16 in the UEFA Cup (4–1 on aggregate).

Leone featured less in the 2009–10 campaign, but still took part in 11 Primeira Liga matches as Braga finished a best-ever second, netting in a 2–0 home victory over C.D. Nacional on 8 January 2010. He returned to his country in June, agreeing to a deal at Sport Club Recife.

In May 2011, the 32-year-old Leone decided not to extend his contract with Sport and left the club.

== Honours ==
Vasco da Gama

- Taça Guanabara: 2001

Ituano

- Campeonato Brasileiro Série C: 2003

Cruzeiro

- Campeonato Mineiro: 2006
