= Felipe (footballer, born 1978) =

Brazilian footballer

Personal information
- Full name: Felipe Reinaldo da Silva
- Date of birth: April 17, 1978 (age 48)
- Place of birth: Ernestina, Brazil
- Height: 1.73 m (5 ft 8 in)
- Position: Striker

Youth career
- 1997: Passo Fundo

Senior career*
Years	Team	Apps	(Gls)
1998–2000	Passo Fundo	-	(-)
2000	Vitória	3	(1)
2001	→ Ituano (loan)	-	(-)
2001	→ Figueirense (loan)	-	(-)
2001–2002	→ Caxias (loan)	-	(-)
2003	Passo Fundo	10	(15)
2003	América-SP	18	(15)
2003	Joinville	3	(1)
2004	Ulbra	8	(10)
2005–2006	Passo Fundo	11	(5)
2006–2008	Náutico	59	(22)
2009–2010	Goiás	30	(13)
2011–2012	Atlético Goianiense	26	(8)
2013	América Mineiro	0	(0)
2013–	Passo Fundo		
- * Club domestic league appearances and goals as of 5 December 2011 ‡ National team caps and goals as of 10 August 2010

Felipe Reinaldo da Silva (born April 17, 1978) is a Brazilian football striker who plays for Passo Fundo.

== Club career ==
Felipe previously played for Vitória and Náutico in the Campeonato Brasileiro Série A.

He scored twice in the opening of Brasileirao 2009 against his former club Nautico, the match ended 3-3.

== Honours ==
Top scorer Campeonato Gaúcho: 2

- 2000, 2005
