= Geovane Maranhão =

Brazilian footballer (born 1989)

Personal information
- Full name: Geovane Diniz Silva
- Date of birth: 4 February 1989 (age 37)
- Place of birth: Barreirinhas–MA, Brazil
- Height: 1.74 m (5 ft 9 in)
- Position: Forward

Team information
- Current team: Burgan SC

Youth career
- 2008: Marília

Senior career*
Years	Team	Apps	(Gls)
2009	Artsul	25	(11)
2010	Vasco da Gama	6	(0)
2010–2011	Duque de Caxias	26	(5)
2011–2012	Belenenses	18	(1)
2013–2015	Resende	59	(11)
2015–2017	Madureira	35	(4)
2016	→ Botafogo (loan)	1	(0)
2017	→ Portuguesa da Ilha (loan)	12	(2)
2018–2019	Al Hilal Club		
2019–	Burgan SC		
- * Club domestic league appearances and goals

Geovane Diniz Silva or simply Geovane Maranhão (born 4 February 1989), is a Brazilian footballer who plays as a striker for Al Hilal EC.

== Career ==
Ahead of the 2019–20 season, Maranhão joined Burgan SC from fellow Kuwaiti club Al Hilal Club.

== Career statistics ==
Club performance			League		Cup		Other		Total	
Season	Club	League	Apps	Goals	Apps	Goals	Apps	Goals	Apps	Goals
2013	Resende	Copa do Brasil	-	-	1	0	-	-	1	0
2013	Resende	Carioca	-	-	-	-	11	2	15	2
2014	Resende	Copa do Brasil	-	-	1	0	-	-	1	0
2014	Resende	Carioca	-	-	-	-	15	2	15	2
2014	Resende	Copa Rio	-	-	-	-	15	5	15	5
2015	Madureira	Série C	14	3	-	-	-	-	14	3
2015	Madureira	Carioca	-	-	-	-	13	2	13	2
2015	Madureira	Copa Rio	-	-	-	-	7	1	7	1
2016	Madureira	Carioca	-	-	-	-	14	0	14	0

== Honours ==
Vasco da Gama

- Campeonato Brasileiro Série B: 2009

Resende

- Copa Rio: 2015

With: Al-Hilal Club

- Sudan Premier League

Champion: (1) 2018
