= Romerito (footballer, born 1975) =

Brazilian footballer

Personal information
- Full name: Romero Mendonça Sobrinho
- Date of birth: January 14, 1975 (age 51)
- Place of birth: Itaguaru, Brazil
- Height: 1.83 m (6 ft 0 in)
- Position: Forward

Youth career
- 1993–1996: Atlético-GO

Senior career*
Years	Team	Apps	(Gls)
1997–1998	Corinthians		
1999	Botafogo-SP		
2000	São Caetano		
2001	Marília		
2001	Brasiliense		
2003–2005	Santo André		
2005–2010	Goiás		
2007–2008	→ Sport (Loan)		
2010–2011	Sport		
2012	Comercial		
2012	Juventus		
2013	Goianésia		
2014	Anapolina		
2013	Goianésia		

Managerial career
- 2016–: Goianésia
- * Club domestic league appearances and goals

Romero Mendonça Sobrinho (born January 14, 1975, in Itaguaru), or simply Romerito, is a Brazilian former professional who played as a forward.

== Honours ==
Corinthians

- São Paulo State League: 1997

Santo André

- Copa do Brasil: 2004

Goiás

- Goías State League: 2006

Sport Recife

- Pernambuco State League: 2008
- Copa do Brasil: 2008
