= Fábio Gomes (footballer, born 1981) =

Brazilian footballer

Personal information
- Date of birth: February 6, 1981 (age 45)
- Place of birth: Rio Claro, Brazil
- Height: 1.69 m (5 ft 7 in)
- Position: Defensive midfielder

Team information
- Current team: Paulista

Youth career
- 2000–2001: Paulista

Senior career*
Years	Team	Apps	(Gls)
2002	Paulista		
2003–2004	→ Palmeiras (Loan)	15	(0)
2005–2006	Paulista		
2007	Sport		
2008	Ceará		
2009	Atlético Goianiense	11	(0)
2010	Marília		
2010–?	Paulista		
- * Club domestic league appearances and goals

Fábio Gomes (born February 6, 1981) is a Brazilian former professional footballer who played as a defensive midfielder.
