= 2008 Campeonato Pernambucano =

The Campeonato Pernambucano 2008 is the 94th edition of the Campeonato Pernambucano. The competition was won by Sport.

== Format ==
Série A1 (A1 Series)

The Campeonato Pernambucano is divided into two rounds: Taça Tabocas e Guararapes (Tabocas and Guararapes Cup) and Taça Confederação do Equador (Confederation of the Equator Cup). In 2008, they will have two different formats.

The Tabocas and Guararapes Cup consists of two stages. In the first, the twelve teams are divided into three groups (by geographic criteria) and play with the other teams of the same group. After six rounds, the teams will be redistributed in other three groups (by technical criteria) and, again, play with the other teams of the same group. At the end of the 12 rounds, the team with the best campaign will be declared winner of this Cup.

The Confederation of the Equator Cup consists of two groups of six teams each, playing against each other twice. On Group G, the participating clubs are the six teams with the best campaigns on the first Cup. On Group H the participating clubs are the six teams with the worst campaigns on the first Cup. The Cup winner will be the team with the best campaign after the 10th round of the Group G. The two worst campaigns after 10 rounds of Group H will be relegated to the following year's second level.

The Campeonato Pernambucano will be decided in two extra matches between the winner of the two Cups. If a club win the two cups it is declared as the Campeonato Pernambucano 2008 champions.

== Participating clubs ==
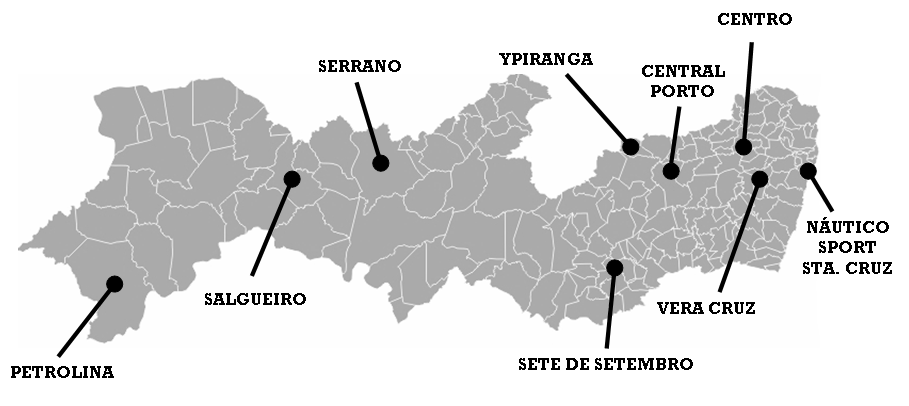
Campeonato Pernambucano 2008 map.

Club	City	Stadium
Central	Caruaru	Lacerdão
Centro Limoeirense	Limoeiro	José Vareda
Náutico	Recife	Aflitos
Petrolina	Petrolina	Paulo de Souza Coelho
Porto	Caruaru	Antônio Inácio
Salgueiro	Salgueiro	Cornélio de Barros
Santa Cruz	Recife	Arruda
Serrano	Serra Talhada	Pereirão
Sete de Setembro	Garanhuns	Gigante do Agreste
Sport	Recife	Ilha do Retiro
Vera Cruz	Vitória de Santo Antão	Carneirão
Ypiranga	Santa Cruz do Capibaribe	Limeirão

== Taça Tabocas e Guararapes ==
First stage

Group A	Group B	Group C
Náutico	Santa Cruz	Sport
Serrano	Petrolina	Salgueiro
Porto	Ypiranga	Central
Centro Limoeirense	Vera Cruz	Sete de Setembro

Second stage

Group D	Group E	Group F
Náutico	Santa Cruz	Sport
Petrolina	Central	Serrano
Centro Limoeirense	Ypiranga	Salgueiro
Sete de Setembro	Porto	Vera Cruz

Standings
P	Team	Groups	Pts	G	W	D	L	GF	GA	GD
1	Sport	C/F	14	6	4	2	0	13	5	8
2	Santa Cruz	B/E	11	6	3	2	1	10	6	4
3	Serrano	A/F	11	6	3	2	1	7	7	0
4	Náutico	A/D	10	6	3	1	2	11	8	3
5	Central	C/E	8	6	2	2	2	10	8	2
6	Petrolina	B/D	8	6	2	2	2	7	6	1
7	Salgueiro	C/F	8	6	2	2	2	5	9	-4
8	Ypiranga	B/E	7	6	2	1	3	10	12	-2
9	Centro Limoeirense	A/D	7	6	2	1	3	6	8	-2
10	Vera Cruz	B/F	6	6	1	3	2	7	10	-3
11	Porto	A/E	5	6	1	2	3	4	5	-1
12	Sete de Setembro	C/D	2	6	0	2	4	4	10	-6
P - position; Pts – points earned; G – games played; W - matches won; D - matches drawn; L - matches lost;GF – goals for; GA – goals against; GD – goal difference; Groups X/Y - X = Groupo in the First Stage and Y = Group in the Second Stage

Taça Tabocas e Guararapes champion, qualified to the Taça Confederação do Equador's Group G and qualified to the final
Qualification Zone to the Taça Confederação do Equador's Group G
Qualification Zone to the Taça Confederação do Equador's Group H

== Taça Confederação do Equador ==
Second stage groups

Group G (Championship group)	Group H (Relegation group)
Sport	Santa Cruz
Náutico	Centro Limoeirense
Ypiranga	Petrolina
Serrano	Vera Cruz
Central	Porto
Salgueiro	Sete de Setembro

Group G - Standings
P	Team	Pts	G	W	D	L	GF	GA	GD
1	Sport	21	10	6	3	1	16	4	12
2	Central	17	10	5	2	3	19	13	6
3	Náutico	15	10	4	3	3	19	9	10
4	Salgueiro	13	10	4	1	5	9	15	-6
5	Ypiranga	11	10	3	2	5	18	26	-8
6	Serrano	7	10	2	1	7	6	20	-14

Taça Confederação do Equador champion and qualified to the final
Stay at 2009 Campeonato Pernambucano Série A1

Group H - Standings
P	Team	Pts	G	W	D	L	GF	GA	GD
1	Santa Cruz	33	22	8	9	5	37	31	6
2	Petrolina	28	22	7	7	8	32	33	-1
3	Porto	26	22	6	8	8	28	25	3
4	Sete de Setembro	20	22	4	8	10	21	31	-10
5	Vera Cruz	20	22	4	8	10	27	35	-8
6	Centro Limoeirense	19	22	5	4	13	23	46	-23

Stay at 2009 Campeonato Pernambucano Série A1
Relegated to the 2009 Campeonato Pernambucano Série A2

Campeonato Pernambucano
2008 Winners
Sport
37th Title
