= Júnior Maranhão =

Brazilian footballer

Personal information
- Full name: Francisco Pereira da Costa Júnior
- Date of birth: June 17, 1977 (age 49)
- Place of birth: Colinas, Maranhão, Brazil
- Height: 1.77 m (5 ft 9 1/2 in)
- Position: Defensive midfielder

Team information
- Current team: S.E. River Plate

Youth career
- Imperatriz

Senior career*
Years	Team	Apps	(Gls)
1997	Imperatriz		
1998–2000	Americano Maranhão		
2001	Figueirense		
2001–2002	Sergipe		
2003	Ituano		
2004	Caldense		
2004	Real Madrid Castilla		
2005	Uniclinic		
2005–2006	Santa Cruz		
2007	Oita Trinita	11	(0)
2007–2008	Sport Recife		
2009	Mirassol		
2009	Campinense	4	(0)
2010	Rio Branco		
2010	Salgueiro	5	(1)
2011	Marília		
2011	Serrano		
2011–	S.E. River Plate	6	(0)
- * Club domestic league appearances and goals

Francisco Pereira da Costa Júnior (born June 17, 1977), known as Júnior Maranhão, is a Brazilian football player.

== Career ==
Júnior Maranhão played for Sergipe in the Campeonato Sergipano and Campeonato Brasileiro Série B.

== Career statistics ==
Appearances and goals by club, season and competition
Club	Season	League			Emperor's Cup		J.League Cup		Total	
Club	Season	Division	Apps	Goals	Apps	Goals	Apps	Goals	Apps	Goals
Oita Trinita	2007	J1 League	11	0	0	0	6	0	17	0
Career total			11	0	0	0	6	0	17	0
