= Carlinhos Bala =

Brazilian footballer (born 1979)

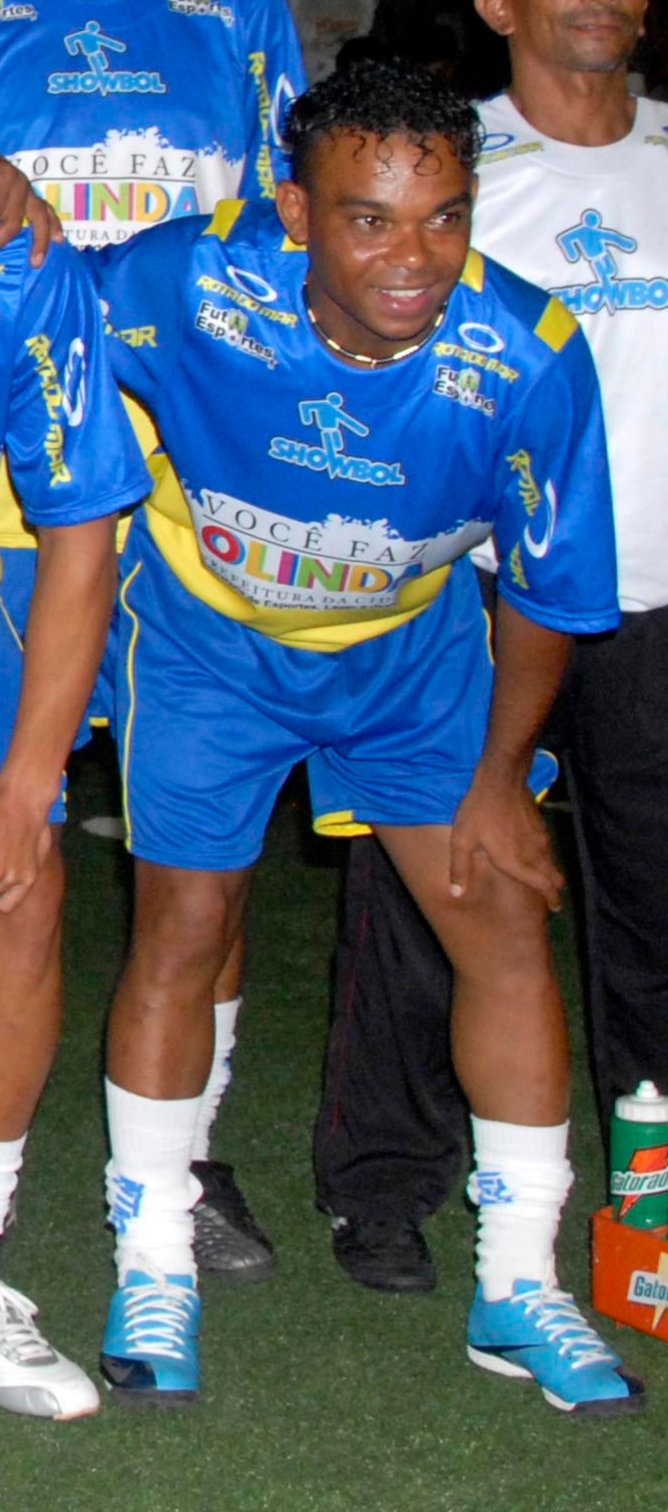
- Carlinhos Bala in 2010

Personal information
- Full name: José Carlos da Silva
- Date of birth: 17 September 1979 (age 47)
- Place of birth: Recife, Brazil
- Height: 1.62 m (5 ft 4 in)
- Position: Striker

Youth career
- Santa Cruz

Senior career*
Years	Team	Apps	(Gls)
1999–2001	Santa Cruz		
2001	Náutico	7	(0)
2001–2006	Santa Cruz	31	(13)
2002–2004	→ Beira Mar (loan)	37	(2)
2004–2005	Thailand Tobacco Monopoly		
2006–2008	Cruzeiro	20	(5)
2007–2008	→ Sport (loan)	66	(15)
2009–2010	Náutico	29	(9)
2010	Atlético Goianiense	4	(0)
2011	Sport	5	(0)
2011	Fortaleza	6	(2)
2012	Santa Cruz		
2012	CRB		
- * Club domestic league appearances and goals

José Carlos da Silva (born 17 September 1979), or simply Carlinhos Bala, is a Brazilian former professional footballer who played as a striker.

== Personal life ==
He is an evangelical Christian, having converted after his retirement from football.
