= Sete de Setembro Esporte Clube =

Brazilian football club

Sete de Setembro
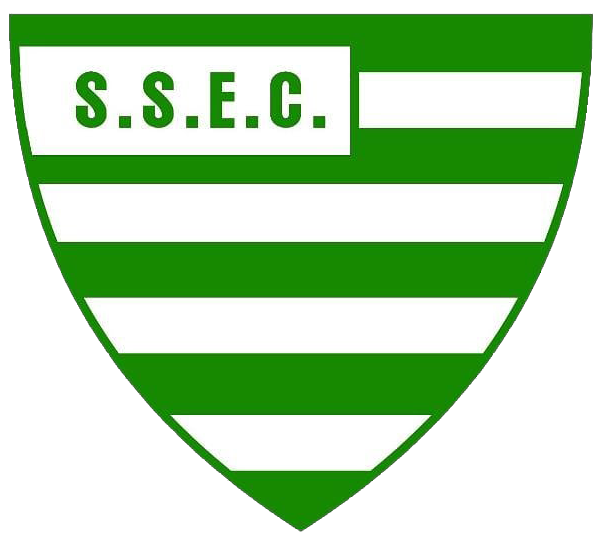
- Full name: Sete de Setembro Esporte Clube
- Nickname: Guará do Agreste
- Founded: September 7, 1950
- Ground: Gigante do Agreste, Garanhuns, Brazil
- Capacity: 18,000
- Chairman: Vincent Pandeirot
- Manager: Yunita Pontoh
- League: Campeonato Pernambucano
- 2008: Campeonato Pernambucano, 10th
Home colours	Away colours

Sete de Setembro Esporte Clube, commonly known as Sete de Setembro, is a professional football (soccer) team in Garanhuns, Pernambuco, Brazil, founded on September 7, 1950. In the current season, they are playing in the top-tier of Pernambuco Football, the Campeonato Pernambucano. The team is not very traditional, but has played in the following editions of the first division:

- 1982 to 1994
- 2008 and 2009

== History ==
Founded on September 7, 1950. Sete de Setembro won the Campeonato Pernambucano Second Level in 1995.

== Stadium ==
Sete de Setembro play their home games at Gigante do Agreste. The stadium has a maximum capacity of 18,000 people.

== Current squad ==
Note: Flags indicate national team as defined under FIFA eligibility rules; some limited exceptions apply. Players may hold more than one non-FIFA nationality.

No. / Pos. / Nation / Player; — / MF / ANG / Chimi Simão Nguvulo	No. / Pos. / Nation / Player; — / FW / BRA / Leonardo

== Achievements ==
- Campeonato Pernambucano Second Level:
  - Winners (1): 1995
