= Estádio Ilha do Retiro =

Football stadium in Recife, Brazil

Estádio Adelmar da Costa Carvalho
- Ilha do Retiro
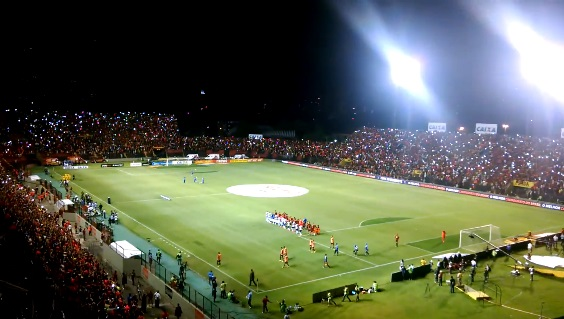
- Sisbrace
- Interactive map of Estádio Adelmar da Costa Carvalho
- Full name: Estádio Adelmar da Costa Carvalho
- Location: Recife, Brazil
- Coordinates: 08°03′46″S 34°54′10″W
- Owner: Sport Recife
- Capacity: 26,300 (limited); 32,983
- Surface: Grass
- Field size: 105 x 78m

Construction
- Opened: 1937

Estádio Adelmar da Costa Carvalho, commonly known as Estádio Ilha do Retiro, Ilha do Retiro or simply Ilha, is a football stadium situated in Recife, State of Pernambuco, in Northeastern Brazil, and owned by Sport Club do Recife.

The stadium's official name is Estádio Adelmar da Costa Carvalho, and it was inaugurated on July 4, 1937. The stadium's common name, Ilha do Retiro, is the name of the neighborhood where it is located. The stadium's official name, Adelmar da Costa Carvalho, is in honor of the Sport Club do Recife president who presided over the first major renovation of the stadium.

== History ==
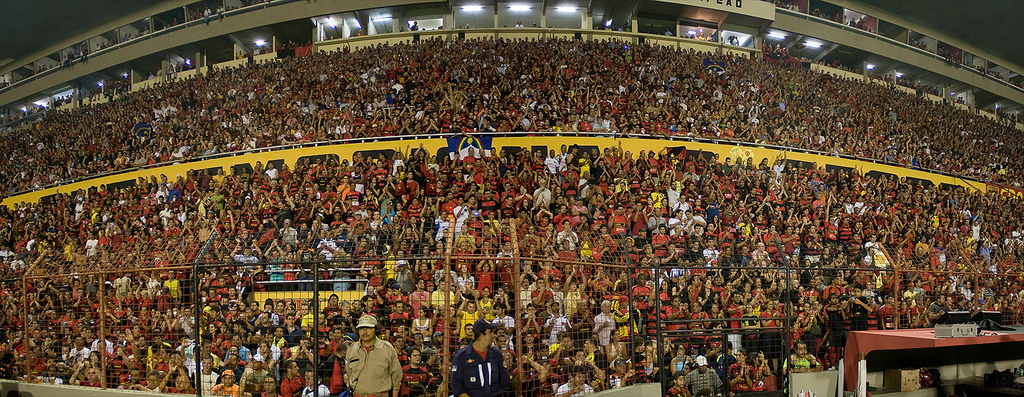

Ilha do Retiro was the first stadium to be built in Recife, after Sport Recife bought a 17-hectare small ranch.

In the 1950 World Cup, the match between Chile and the United States was played at the stadium.

In 1987, fans watched Sport win a historical match against “paulista” side Guarani, that gave the Lion their first national trophy, the Campeonato Brasileiro of 1987, even though Flamengo claim to have won it too. The case went to the Supreme Federal Court and Sport won.

In 2008, the stadium was once again the stage of an epic match, this time at the final of the 2008 Copa do Brasil, against Corinthians. They had lost the first leg on Parque São Jorge by 3x1, with the leonine goal being scored on the final moments of the match. Now playing in Recife, Sport managed to get a 2x0 win, and won on away goals. The victory was so unexpected, that Corinthians had signed a trophy afterparty before the match, only for the party to be cancelled later on.

== Information ==
- Official name: Estádio Adelmar da Costa Carvalho
- Capacity: 32,983 spectators
- Pitch Size: 105m x 78m
- Opened on July 4, 1937 (Sport-Santa Cruz 6–5)
- Record attendance: 56,875 spectators (Sport-Porto/PE 2–0, June 7, 1998, in Campeonato Pernambucano)
- Address: Avenida Sport Club do Recife, s/nº - Recife (PE)
