= Estádio dos Aflitos =

Football stadium in Recife, Brazil

Coordinates: 8°02′26″S 34°53′48″W

Estádio Eládio de Barros Carvalho
- Aflitos
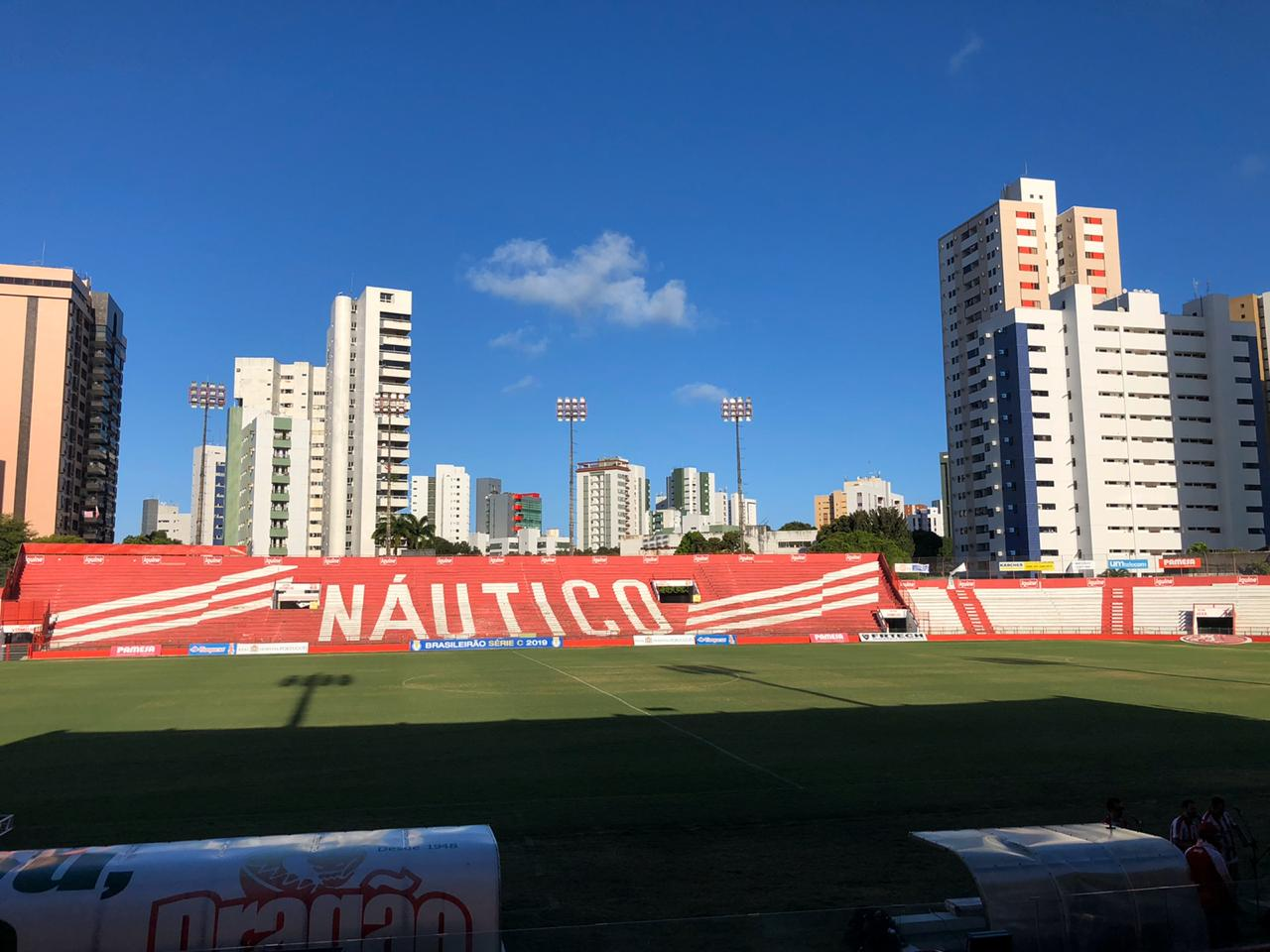
- Sisbrace
- Interactive map of Estádio Eládio de Barros Carvalho
- Full name: Estádio Eládio de Barros Carvalho
- Location: Recife
- Owner: Náutico
- Operator: Náutico
- Capacity: 19,800
- Surface: Grass

Construction
- Opened: June 25, 1939

Tenant
- Náutico (1939–2013; 2018–present)

Estádio Eládio de Barros Carvalho, also known as Estádio dos Aflitos, is a football stadium located in Recife, Brazil. The stadium was built in 1939 and is able to hold 20,000 people.

Estádio dos Aflitos is owned by Clube Náutico Capibaribe. The stadium is named after Eládio de Barros Carvalho, who was Náutico's president fourteen times. Aflitos is nicknamed this way because it is located in Nossa Senhora dos Aflitos neighborhood.

== History ==
In 1939, the stadium was built. The inaugural match was played on June 25 of that year, when Náutico beat Sport Recife 5–2. The first goal of the stadium was scored by Náutico's Wilson.

On July 1, 1945, Náutico beat Flamengo de Recife 21–3. This was Náutico's largest win at Estádio dos Aflitos.

During the 1970s, the Náutico board of directors started a project to build a new 80,000 spectators stadium at Guabiraba neighborhood, to replace the outdated Estádio dos Aflitos. However, the project failed, and the stadium was not built.

During the early years of the 1980s, the architect Hélvio Polito developed a project to increase the stadium maximum capacity to 25,000 spectators with the construction of new bleachers. This project also failed.

In May, 1995, during a meeting of the UniNáutico group, which is a Náutico supporting group, the architect Múcio Jucá suggested the need to increase the stadium maximum capacity. In August of that year, a preliminary study about the technical viability of the stadium expansion and modernization was approved by the club's estate board. The first stadium improvement was the elevation of the internal walls of the gerais section from two meters to five meters.

In 1996, the stadium reformation started, ending only on April 7, 2002, when it was reinaugurated.

The stadium's attendance record currently stands at 28,022, set on December 4, 1997, when Náutico beat América Mineiro 1–0.
