= Serrano Futebol Clube (PE) =

Brazilian football club

Serrano
- Full name: Serrano Futebol Clube
- Nickname(s): Lampiões da Fiel
- Founded: October 1, 1983
- Ground: Nildo Pereira de Menezes
- Capacity: 7,000
- Chairman: José Raimundo Filho
- Manager: Pedro Manta
- League: Campeonato Pernambucano
Home colors	Away colors

Serrano Futebol Clube is a Brazilian football soccer club, founded in 1983, from Serra Talhada, Pernambuco.

== Honours ==
- Pernambuco Championship 2nd level runner-up: 2003
- Campeonato do Interior: 2005

== Appearances in competitions ==
- Campeonato Pernambucano: 2004 to 2008
- Campeonato Brasileiro Série C: 2005
