= 2008 Copa do Brasil =

Copa do Brasil 2008

Tournament details
- Country: Brazil
- Dates: February 13 – June 11
- Teams: 64

Final positions
- Champions: Sport (PE)
- Runners-up: Corinthians (SP)

Tournament statistics
- Matches played: 111
- Goals scored: 342 (3.08 per match)

The Copa do Brasil 2008 was the 20th staging of the Copa do Brasil, starting on February 13, 2008 and finishing on June 11, 2008. It was played by 64 teams, either qualified through their respected state championships (54) or by the CBF Rankings (10). The clubs that played the Copa Libertadores 2008 didn't participate in the Copa do Brasil 2008 because of scheduling problems. It was won by Sport-PE.

== Format ==
The tournament was played in two-legged knockout stages. In the first two rounds the away team automatically goes through to the next round if they beat the home team by a 2-goal difference or more in the first leg.

The away goals rule was used in the Copa do Brasil, which is an unusual feature when compared to other South American competitions. For example, the Copa Libertadores did not adopt this rule until 2005.

Copa do Brasil is an opportunity for teams from smaller states to play against the big teams and episodes of giant-killing have happened at a regular rate throughout the competition history.

The winner automatically qualifies for the next year's Copa Libertadores, which prevents a team from winning the Copa do Brasil twice in a row.

== Results ==
=== Bracket 1 ===
First Round
Corinthians-SP	6	–	6
Barras-PI	0	–	0
Fortaleza-CE	0	4	4
América-SE	0	0	0
Goiás-GO	4	–	4
Cacerense-MT	1	–	1
Santa Cruz-PE	1	1	2
Fast Clube-AM	3	0	3
Grêmio-RS	1	6	7
Jaciara-MT	0	0	0
Atlético-GO	0	3	3
Ituiutaba-MG	0	2	2
Coritiba-PR	0	6	6
Tuna Luso-PA	0	0	0
São Caetano-SP	2	–	2
Maranhão-MA ^{DSQ}	1	–	1

Second Round
Corinthians-SP	2	2	4
Fortaleza-CE	1	0	1
Goiás-GO	3	–	3
Fast Clube-AM	1	–	1
Grêmio-RS	1	2	3 (3)
Atlético-GO	2	1	3 (4)
Coritiba-PR	0	0	0
São Caetano-SP	1	0	1

Round of 16
Corinthians-SP	1	4	5
Goiás-GO	3	0	3
Atlético-GO	1	1	2
São Caetano-SP	2	2	4

Quarterfinals
Corinthians-SP	2	3	5
São Caetano-SP	1	1	2

=== Bracket 2 ===
First Round
Botafogo-RJ	3	–	3
Rio Branco-AC	1	–	1
River-PI (a)	2	2	4
Jaguaré-ES	3	0	3
Portuguesa-SP	1	3	4
Ulbra Ji-Paraná-RO	1	1	2
Volta Redonda-RJ	2	–	2
Roma-PR	0	–	0
Atlético-MG	7	–	7
Palmas-TO	0	–	0
Nacional-AM	3	–	3
Guará-DF	1	–	1
Náutico-PE	7	–	7
Atlético-RR	1	–	1
Juventus-SP	1	5	6
Coruripe-AL	4	1	5

Second Round
Botafogo-RJ	1	2	3
River-PI	2	0	2
Portuguesa-SP	0	2	2
Volta Redonda-RJ	0	0	0
Atlético-MG	2	4	6
Nacional-AM	2	1	3
Náutico-PE	0	3	3
Juventus-SP	2	0	2

Round of 16
Botafogo-RJ	1	2	3
Portuguesa-SP	1	1	2
Atlético-MG (a)	2	1	3
Náutico-PE	3	0	3

Quarterfinals
Botafogo-RJ	0	2	2
Atlético-MG	0	0	0

=== Bracket 3 ===
First Round
Palmeiras-SP	2	–	2
CENE-MS	0	–	0
Remo-PA	0	0	0
Central-PE	0	2	2
Sport-PE	2	4	6
Imperatriz-MA	2	1	3
Brasiliense-DF	1	1	2
Ulbra-RS	1	0	1
Internacional-RS	4	–	4
Nacional-PB	0	–	0
Guarani-SP	1	0	1
Chapecoense-SC	3	0	3
Vitória-BA	4	–	4
Sousa-PB	1	–	1
Paraná-PR	0	4	4
Trem-AP	0	0	0

Second Round
Palmeiras-SP	5	–	5
Central-PE	1	–	1
Sport-PE	2	4	6
Brasiliense-DF	1	1	2
Internacional-RS	2	–	2
Chapecoense-SC	0	–	0
Vitória-BA	0	2	2
Paraná-PR (a)	1	1	2

Round of 16
Palmeiras-SP	0	1	1
Sport-PE	0	4	4
Internacional-RS	0	5	5
Paraná-PR	2	1	3

Quarterfinals
Sport-PE	0	3	3
Internacional-RS	1	1	2

=== Bracket 4 ===
First Round
Vasco da Gama-RJ	1	3	4
Itabaiana-SE	0	2	2
Bragantino-SP (a)	2	2	4
Democrata (GV)-MG	3	1	4
Bahia-BA	2	2	4
Icasa-CE	3	2	5
Criciúma-SC	2	2	4
Baraúnas-RN	2	0	2
Atlético-PR	1	1	2 (3)
Corinthians-AL (p)	1	1	2 (4)
Paranavaí-PR	4	3	7
Águia Negra-MS	3	3	6
Juventude-RS (p)	0	0	0 (5)
Linhares-ES	0	0	0 (4)
ABC-RN	1	1	2 (3)
Madureira-RJ (p)	1	1	2 (4)

Second Round
Vasco da Gama-RJ	2	2	4
Bragantino-SP	2	1	3
Icasa-CE	1	–	1
Criciúma-SC	6	–	6
Corinthians-AL	1	4	5
Paranavaí-PR	0	1	1
Juventude-RS	3	–	3
Madureira-RJ	0	–	0

Round of 16
Vasco da Gama-RJ	1	2	3
Criciúma-SC	0	2	2
Corinthians-AL (a)	2	1	3
Juventude-RS	0	3	3

Quarterfinals
Vasco da Gama-RJ	5	3	8
Corinthians-AL	1	1	2

=== Final phase ===
Semi-finals
1	Corinthians-SP (p)	1	2	3 (5)
4	Botafogo-RJ	2	1	3 (4)
3	Sport-PE (p)	2	0	2 (5)
2	Vasco da Gama-RJ	0	2	2 (4)

Finals
Corinthians-SP	3	0	3
Sport-PE (a)	1	2	3

== Top scorers ==
Updated to games played 2008-06-06

#	Scorer	Team	Goals
1	(Brazil) Edmundo	Vasco da Gama-RJ	6
1	(Brazil) Romerito	Sport-PE	6
1	(Brazil) Wellington Paulista	Botafogo-RJ	6
4	(Argentina) Germán Herrera	Corinthians-SP	5
4	(Brazil) Reinaldo	Corinthians-AL	5

== Champion ==
Copa do Brasil 2008:

Sport-PE
First Title
