= 2009 Sport Club do Recife season =

Sport Recife
2009 season
- Chairman: Sílvio Alexandre Guimarães
- Manager: Nelsinho Baptista; Levi Gomes (c); Émerson Leão; Péricles Chamusca
- Stadium: Ilha do Retiro
- Série A: 20th
- Pernambucano: Champions (38th title)
- Copa Libertadores: Round of 16
- Top goalscorer: League: Fabiano and Wilson (8); All: Ciro (15)
Home colours	Away colours	Third colours

The 2009 season was Sport Recife's 105th season in the club's history. Sport competed in the Campeonato Pernambucano, Série A and Copa Libertadores.

== Squad ==
Note: Flags indicate national team as defined under FIFA eligibility rules; some limited exceptions apply. Players may hold more than one non-FIFA nationality.

No.	Pos.	Nation	Player
1	GK	BRA	Magrão
2	DF	BRA	César Lucena (captain)
3	DF	BRA	Igor
6	DF	BRA	Dutra
11	FW	BRA	Ciro
12	GK	BRA	Cléber
13	DF	BRA	Elias
14	MF	BRA	Andrade
15	MF	BRA	Jonas
16	DF	BRA	Juliano
17	FW	BRA	Wilson
19	MF	BRA	Luciano Henrique
21	GK	BRA	Saulo

No.	Pos.	Nation	Player
22	DF	BRA	Moacir
25	DF	BRA	Daniel Paulista
27	MF	BRA	Elizeu
28	MF	BRA	Fabiano
30	MF	BRA	Hugo
32	FW	BRA	Everton Heleno
34	FW	BRA	Eduardo
35	FW	BOL	Juan Carlos Arce
37	MF	BRA	Zé Antônio
40	MF	BRA	Isael
42	MF	BRA	Adriano
44	DF	BRA	Freire
45	DF	BRA	Madson

== Statistics ==
=== Overall ===
Games played	68 (22 Pernambucano, 8 Copa Libertadores, 38 Série A)
Games won	31 (19 Pernambucano, 5 Copa Libertadores, 7 Série A)
Games drawn	14 (3 Pernambucano, 1 Copa Libertadores, 10 Série A)
Games lost	23 (0 Pernambucano, 2 Copa Libertadores, 21 Série A)
Goals scored	122
Goals conceded	91
Goal difference	+31
Best results (goal difference)	5–0 (A) v Cabense - Pernambucano - 2009.04.01
Worst result (goal difference)	1–5 (A) v Fluminense - Série A - 2009.08.06
Top scorer	Ciro (15)

Source: Sport Recife official website

=== Goalscorers ===
Place	Pos.	Nat.	No.	Name	Campeonato Pernambucano	Copa Libertadores	Série A	Total
1	MF	(Brazil)	11	Ciro	14	1	0	15
2	FW	(Brazil)	17	Wilson	3	3	8	14
3	FW	(Brazil)	24	Vandinho	5	1	7	13
4	MF	(Brazil)	28	Fabiano	0	0	8	8
4	FW	(Brazil)	19	Luciano Henrique	5	0	3	8
5	FW	(Brazil)	20	Weldon	2	0	4	6
6	DF	(Brazil)	4	Durval	3	0	2	5
6	MF	(Brazil)	7	Fumagalli	4	0	1	5
6	FW	(Brazil)	9	Guto	4	0	1	5
6	MF	(Brazil)	10	Paulo Baier	4	1	0	5
7	DF	(Brazil)	3	Igor	1	1	2	4
7	FW	(Bolivia)	35	Juan Carlos Arce	0	0	4	4
8	MF	(Brazil)	14	Andrade	0	2	1	3
8	MF	(Brazil)	22	Moacir	2	1	0	3
9	DF	(Brazil)	6	Dutra	0	0	2	2
10	DF	(Brazil)	23	Bruno Teles	1	0	0	1
10	DF	(Brazil)	2	César Lucena	1	0	0	1
10	MF	(Brazil)	25	Daniel Paulista	0	1	0	1
10	DF	(Brazil)	29	Élder Granja	0	0	1	1
10	MF	(Brazil)	39	Fininho	0	0	1	1
10	MF	(Brazil)	30	Hugo	0	0	1	1
10	MF	(Brazil)	16	Kássio	1	0	0	1
10	FW	(Brazil)	43	Paulinho	0	0	1	1
10	MF	(Brazil)	8	Sandro Goiano	1	0	0	1
				Own goals	2	0	1	3
				Total	53	11	48	112

=== Managers performance ===
Name	From	To	P	W	D	L	GF	GA	Avg%	Ref
(Brazil) Nelsinho Baptista	10 January 2009	24 May 2009	33	24	5	4	67	25	77%	
(Brazil) Levi Gomes (c)	30 May 2009		1	0	1	0	2	2	33%	
(Brazil) Émerson Leão	7 June 2009	26 July 2009	10	3	2	5	17	18	36%	
(Brazil) Levi Gomes (c)	29 July 2009	6 August 2009	3	0	0	3	1	7	0%	
(Brazil) Péricles Chamusca	10 August 2009	7 November 2009	17	4	5	8	22	28	33%	
(Brazil) Levi Gomes (c)	11 November 2009	6 December 2009	4	0	1	3	3	10	8%	

(c) Indicates the caretaker manager

== Competitions ==
=== Campeonato Pernambucano ===
==== First stage (1817 Constitutionalist Revolution Cup) ====
10 January 2009 1	Sport	4–0	Vitória das Tabocas	Recife
15:30 (UTC-3)	Fumagalli (pen.); Ciro, Kássio			Stadium: Estádio Adelmar da Costa Carvalho (Ilha do Retiro)

14 January 2009 2	Salgueiro	0–2	Sport	Salgueiro
20:30 (UTC-3)			Ciro; Luciano Henrique (pen.)	Stadium: Estádio Cornélio de Barros

18 January 2009 3	Sport	3–0	Serrano	Recife
16:00 (UTC-3)	Luciano Henrique 30'; Ciro 60'; Sandro Goiano 80'			Stadium: Estádio Adelmar da Costa Carvalho (Ilha do Retiro)

21 January 2009 4	Sport	1–0	Sete de Setembro	Recife
20:30 (UTC-3)	Luciano Henrique			Stadium: Estádio Adelmar da Costa Carvalho (Ilha do Retiro)

25 January 2009 5	Porto	0–1	Sport	Caruaru
16:00 (UTC-3)			Guto	Stadium: Estádio Luiz José de Lacerda (Lacerdão)

28 January 2009 6	Ypiranga	1–4	Sport	Santa Cruz do Capibaribe
20:30 (UTC-3)	Assis		Guto, Ciro,	Stadium: Estádio Otávio Limeira Alves

31 January 2009 7	Sport	3–1	Petrolina	Recife
16:00 (UTC-3)	Weldon, Durval		Douglas	Stadium: Estádio Adelmar da Costa Carvalho (Ilha do Retiro)

4 February 2009 8	Sport	2–0	Cabense	Recife
21:00 (UTC-3)	Guto; Paulo Baier			Stadium: Estádio Adelmar da Costa Carvalho (Ilha do Retiro)

8 February 2009 9	Santa Cruz	1–1	Sport	Recife
16:00 (UTC-3)	Adílson		Ciro	Stadium: Estádio José do Rego Maciel (Arruda)

11 February 2009 10	Central	1–3	Sport	Caruaru
20:30 (UTC-3)	Careca 88'		César Lucena 6'; Moacir 40'; Luciano Henrique 79'	Stadium: Estádio Luiz José de Lacerda (Lacerdão)

14 February 2009 11	Sport	2–0	Náutico	Recife
16:00 (UTC-3)	Durval; Fumagalli			Stadium: Estádio Adelmar da Costa Carvalho (Ilha do Retiro)

==== Second stage (Confederation of the Equator Cup) ====
1 March 2009 1	Vitória das Tabocas	2–3	Sport	Vitória de Santo Antão
16:00 (UTC-3)	Aleandro,		Fumagalli; Bruno Teles; Vandinho	Stadium: Estádio Municipal Severino Cândido Carneiro

7 March 2009 2	Sport	4–2	Salgueiro	Recife
(UTC-3)	Ciro 18', 58'; Durval 26'; Vitor Caicó 85' (o.g.)		Paulo Rangel; Rosivaldo 73'	Stadium: Estádio Adelmar da Costa Carvalho (Ilha do Retiro)

11 March 2009 3	Serrano	1–3	Sport	Serra Talhada
20:30 (UTC-3)	Caio 22'		Ciro; Vandinho,	Stadium: Estádio Nildo Pereira de Menezes

15 March 2009 4	Sete de Setembro	0–2	Sport	Garanhuns
16:00 (UTC-3)			Ciro; Paulo Baier	Stadium: Estádio Gigante do Agreste

22 March 2009 5	Sport	3–0	Porto	Recife
16:00 (UTC-3)	Romero (o.g.); Vandinho; Paulo Baier			Stadium: Estádio Adelmar da Costa Carvalho (Ilha do Retiro)

25 March 2009 6	Sport	1–1	Ypiranga	Recife
21:50 (UTC-3)	Paulo Baier (pen.)		Serjão	Stadium: Estádio Adelmar da Costa Carvalho (Ilha do Retiro)

28 March 2009 7	Petrolina	0–2	Sport	Petrolina
16:00 (UTC-3)			Wilson 65', 81'	Stadium: Estádio Paulo de Souza Coelho

1 April 2009 8	Cabense	0–5	Sport	Cabo de Santo Agostinho
19:30 (UTC-3)			Vandinho 50'; Ciro 55', Moacir 74'; Luciano Henrique	Stadium: Estádio Gileno de Carli; Referee: Arilson Bispo

5 April 2009 9	Sport	2–1	Santa Cruz	Recife
16:00 (UTC-3)	Ciro; Igor		Marcelo Ramos	Stadium: Estádio Adelmar da Costa Carvalho (Ilha do Retiro)

12 April 2009 10	Sport	2–1	Central	Recife
18:00 (UTC-3)	Fumagalli; Wilson		Fábio Silva (pen.)	Stadium: Estádio Adelmar da Costa Carvalho (Ilha do Retiro)

19 April 2009 11	Náutico	0–0	Sport	Recife
16:00 (UTC-3)				Stadium: Estádio Eládio de Barros Carvalho (Aflitos); Attendance: 18,759; Referee: Héber Roberto Lopes

==== Record ====
Final Position	Points	Matches	Wins	Draws	Losses	Goals For	Goals Away	Win%
1st	60	22	19	3	0	53	12	90%

=== Copa Libertadores ===
18 February 2009 1	Colo-Colo (Chile)	1–2	(Brazil) Sport	Santiago
21:50 (UTC-3)	Barrios 70'	Report	Ciro 7'; Wilson 44'	Stadium: Estadio Monumental David Arellano; Attendance: 23,427; Referee: Saúl Laverni (Argentina)

4 March 2009 2	Sport (Brazil)	2–0	(Ecuador) LDU Quito	Recife
21:50 (UTC-3)	Daniel Paulista 13'; Paulo Baier 72' (pen.)	Report		Stadium: Estádio Adelmar da Costa Carvalho (Ilha do Retiro); Attendance: 20,184; Referee: Jorge Larrionda (Uruguay)

8 April 2009 3	Sport (Brazil)	0–2	(Brazil) Palmeiras	Recife
21:50 (UTC-3)		Report	Keirrison 24'; Diego Souza 73'	Stadium: Estádio Adelmar da Costa Carvalho (Ilha do Retiro); Referee: Carlos Torres (Paraguay)

15 April 2009 4	Palmeiras (Brazil)	1–1	(Brazil) Sport	São Paulo
19:45 (UTC-3)	Keirrison 14' (pen.)	Report	Wilson 45'	Stadium: Estádio Palestra Itália (Parque Antártica); Attendance: 22,372; Referee: Roberto Silvera (Uruguay)

22 April 2009 5	Sport (Brazil)	2–1	(Chile) Colo-Colo	Recife
21:50 (UTC-3)	Moacir 60'; Vandinho 75'	Report	Millar 50'	Stadium: Estádio Adelmar da Costa Carvalho (Ilha do Retiro); Attendance: 20,050; Referee: Héctor Baldassi (Argentina)

29 April 2009 6	LDU Quito (Ecuador)	2–3	(Brazil) Sport	Quito
19:50 (UTC-5)	Espínola 2'; D. Vera 41'	Report	Andrade 23', 77'; Igor 58'	Stadium: Estadio de LDU (La Casa Blanca); Referee: Juan Soto (Venezuela)

==== Round of 16 ====
5 May 2009	Palmeiras (Brazil)	1–0	(Brazil) Sport	São Paulo
21:15 (UTC-3)	Ortigoza 74'	Report		Stadium: Estádio Palestra Itália (Parque Antártica); Attendance: 23,991; Referee: Sergio Pezzotta (Argentina)

12 May 2009	Sport (Brazil)	1–0 (1–3 p)	(Brazil) Palmeiras	Recife
20:15 (UTC-3)	Wilson 83'	Report		Stadium: Estádio Adelmar da Costa Carvalho (Ilha do Retiro); Referee: Carlos Chandía (Chile)
	Penalties
	Luciano Henrique (penalty missed); Igor (penalty scored); Fumagalli (penalty missed); Dutra (penalty missed)		(penalty missed) Mozart; (penalty scored) Marcão; (penalty scored) Danilo; (penalty scored) Armero

==== Record ====
Final Position	Points	Matches	Wins	Draws	Losses	Goals For	Goals Away	Win%
11th	16	8	5	1	2	11	8	66%

=== Série A ===
9 May 2009 1	Sport	1–1	Barueri	Recife
18:30 (UTC-3)	Igor 13'	Report	Pedrão 48'	Stadium: Estádio Adelmar da Costa Carvalho (Ilha do Retiro); Attendance: 16,019; Referee: Francisco de Assis Almeida Filho

16 May 2009 2	Vitória	1–0	Sport	Salvador
18:30 (UTC-3)	Neto Baiano 33'	Report		Stadium: Estádio Manoel Barradas (Barradão); Attendance: 4,588; Referee: Charles Cavalcante Ferreira

24 May 2009 3	Sport	2–3	Atlético Mineiro	Recife
18:30 (UTC-3)	Jonílson 46' (o.g.); Dutra 90'	Report	Éder Luís 6', 10'; Márcio Araújo 42'	Stadium: Estádio Adelmar da Costa Carvalho (Ilha do Retiro); Attendance: 15,315; Referee: Péricles Pegado Cortez

30 May 2009 4	Botafogo	2–2	Sport	Rio de Janeiro
18:30 (UTC-3)	Tony 60'; Fahel 83'	Report	Wilson 7'; Weldon 20'	Stadium: Estádio Olímpico João Havelange (Engenhão); Attendance: 8,655; Referee: Jailson Macedo Freitas

7 June 2009 5	Sport	4–2	Flamengo	Recife
16:00 (UTC-3)	Durval 26'; Weldon 27', 30', 33'	Report	Emerson Sheik 5', 9'	Stadium: Estádio Adelmar da Costa Carvalho (Ilha do Retiro); Attendance: 25,602; Referee: Cléber Wellington Abade

13 June 2009 6	Sport	0–1	Atlético Paranaense	Recife
18:30 (UTC-3)		Report	Rafael Santos 74'	Stadium: Estádio Adelmar da Costa Carvalho (Ilha do Retiro); Attendance: 14,118; Referee: Ricardo Marques Ribeiro

20 June 2009 7	Santo André	2–1	Sport	Santo André
16:10 (UTC-3)	Élvis 30'; Marcel Fernandes 90+2'	Report	Hugo 23'	Stadium: Estádio Bruno José Daniel; Attendance: 2,378; Referee: Edivaldo Elias da Silva

28 June 2009 8	Sport	3–1	Grêmio	Recife
18:30 (UTC-3)	Fabiano 18'; Élder Granja 84'; Fumagalli 88'	Report	Jonas 63'	Stadium: Estádio Adelmar da Costa Carvalho (Ilha do Retiro); Attendance: 4,004; Referee: Marcelo de Lima Henrique

4 July 2009 9	Santos	1–0	Sport	Santos
18:30 (UTC-3)	Ganso 88'	Report		Stadium: Estádio Urbano Caldeira (Vila Belmiro); Attendance: 7,826; Referee: Alicio Pena Júnior

12 July 2009 10	Sport	1–0	Goiás	Recife
18:30 (UTC-3)	Fabiano 17' (pen.)	Report		Stadium: Estádio Adelmar da Costa Carvalho (Ilha do Retiro); Attendance: 16,645; Referee: Leandro Vuaden

16 July 2009 11	Corinthians	4–3	Sport	São Paulo
21:00 (UTC-3)	Ronaldo 26', 35'; Cristian 49'; Moradei 79'	Report	Fabiano 12'; Vandinho 63', 67'	Stadium: Estádio Municipal Paulo Machado de Carvalho (Pacaembu); Attendance: 22,756; Referee: Carlos Eugenio Simon

19 July 2009 12	Sport	1–3	Avaí	Recife
18:30 (UTC-3)	Igor 12'	Report	Dudé 13' (o.g.); Roberto 59'; Luis Ricardo 68'	Stadium: Estádio Adelmar da Costa Carvalho (Ilha do Retiro); Attendance: 11,076; Referee: Arilson Bispo da Anunciação

23 July 2009 13	Coritiba	1–1	Sport	Curitiba
21:00 (UTC-3)	Marcelinho Paraíba 33' (pen.)	Report	Dutra 18'	Stadium: Estádio Adelmar da Costa Carvalho (Ilha do Retiro); Attendance: 6,781; Referee: Cléber Wellington Abade

26 July 2009 14	Sport	3–3	Náutico	Recife
16:00 (UTC-3)	Fabiano 39'; Durval 53'; Guto 67'	Report	Carlinhos Bala 25', 74'; Gilmar 47' (pen.)	Stadium: Estádio Adelmar da Costa Carvalho (Ilha do Retiro); Attendance: 7,285; Referee: Wagner Tardelli

29 July 2009 15	Cruzeiro	1–0	Sport	Belo Horizonte
21:50 (UTC-3)	Kléber 89'	Report		Stadium: Estádio Governador Magalhães Pinto (Mineirão); Attendance: 17,954; Referee: Marcelo de Lima Henrique

1 August 2009 16	Sport	0–1	Palmeiras	Recife
18:30 (UTC-3)		Report	Bruno Teles 70'	Stadium: Estádio Adelmar da Costa Carvalho (Ilha do Retiro); Attendance: 16,921; Referee: Péricles Bassols Cortez

6 August 2009 17	Fluminense	5–1	Sport	Rio de Janeiro
21:00 (UTC-3)	Kieza 19', 32'; Rôni 39' (pen.); Carlos Eduardo 66'; Maicon 90'	Report	Vandinho 61' (pen.)	Stadium: Estádio Jornalista Mário Filho (Maracanã); Attendance: 11,086; Referee: Wilton Pereira Sampaio

10 August 2009 18	Internacional	3–0	Sport	Porto Alegre
21:00 (UTC-3)	Giuliano 43'; Sandro 51'; D'Alessandro 85'	Report		Stadium: Estádio José Pinheiro Borda (Beira-Rio); Attendance: 16,650; Referee: Sálvio Spínola

16 August 2009 19	Sport	1–2	São Paulo	Recife
16:00 (UTC-3)	Fabiano 84'	Report	Washington 24'; Hugo 90+2'	Stadium: Estádio Adelmar da Costa Carvalho (Ilha do Retiro); Attendance: 24,329; Referee: Sandro Meira Ricci

19 August 2009 20	Barueri	2–1	Sport	Barueri
21:00 (UTC-3)	Val Baiano 34'; Thiago Humberto 90'	Report	Luciano Henrique 65'	Stadium: Arena Barueri; Attendance: 2,243; Referee: Antonio Hora Filho

22 August 2009 21	Sport	2–0	Vitória	Recife
18:30 (UTC-3)	Andrade 14'; Fabiano 31'	Report		Stadium: Estádio Adelmar da Costa Carvalho (Ilha do Retiro); Attendance: 17,064; Referee: Gutemberg de Paula Fonseca

30 August 2009 22	Atlético Mineiro	1–1	Sport	Belo Horizonte
16:00 (UTC-3)	Renan Oliveira 76'	Report	Arce 47'	Stadium: Estádio Governador Magalhães Pinto (Mineirão); Attendance: 19,783; Referee: Paulo César Oliveira

5 September 2009 23	Sport	2–1	Botafogo	Recife
18:30 (UTC-3)	Fabiano 5'; Wilson 7'	Report	Juninho 55'	Stadium: Estádio Adelmar da Costa Carvalho (Ilha do Retiro); Attendance: 23,601; Referee: Sálvio Spínola

12 September 2009 24	Flamengo	3–0	Sport	Rio de Janeiro
18:30 (UTC-3)	Adriano 2', 89'; Zé Roberto 31'	Report		Stadium: Estádio Jornalista Mário Filho (Maracanã); Attendance: 26,995; Referee: André Luiz Castro

19 September 2009 25	Atlético Paranaense	1–0	Sport	Curitiba
18:30 (UTC-3)	Marcinho 1'	Report		Stadium: Estádio Joaquim Américo Guimarães (Arena da Baixada); Attendance: 15,026; Referee: Paulo César Oliveira

27 September 2009 26	Sport	2–1	Santo André	Recife
18:30 (UTC-3)	Arce 21'; Vandinho 68'	Report	Rodrigo Fabri 33'	Stadium: Estádio Adelmar da Costa Carvalho (Ilha do Retiro); Attendance: 10,513; Referee: Wagner Tardelli

4 October 2009 27	Grêmio	3–3	Sport	Porto Alegre
16:00 (UTC-3)	Jonas 8'; Máxi López 28', 59'	Report	Vandinho 10'; Paulinho 50'; Fininho 73'	Stadium: Estádio Olímpico Monumental; Attendance: 19,174; Referee: Wilson Luiz Seneme

7 October 2009 28	Sport	0–1	Santos	Recife
19:30 (UTC-3)		Report	Felipe Azevedo 37'	Stadium: Estádio Adelmar da Costa Carvalho (Ilha do Retiro); Attendance: 26,249; Referee: Wagner Tardelli

12 October 2009 29	Goiás	1–1	Sport	Goiânia
16:00 (UTC-3)	Léo Lima 50'	Report	Luciano Henrique 81'	Stadium: Estádio do Governo do Estado de Goiás (Serra Dourada); Attendance: 9,621; Referee: Jaílson Macedo Freitas

18 October 2009 30	Sport	2–0	Corinthians	Recife
16:00 (UTC-3)	Arce 36'; Wilson 67'	Report		Stadium: Estádio Adelmar da Costa Carvalho (Ilha do Retiro); Attendance: 21,143; Referee: Francisco Carlos Nascimento

25 October 2009 31	Avaí	2–2	Sport	Florianópolis
18:30 (UTC-3)	Marquinhos 16'; Luis Ricardo 63'	Report	Wilson 4'; Luciano Henrique 7'	Stadium: Estádio Aderbal Ramos da Silva (Ressacada); Attendance: 8,571; Referee: Sálvio Spínola

29 October 2009 32	Sport	1–1	Coritiba	Recife
21:00 (UTC-3)	Fabiano 39'	Report	Ariel 45+2'	Stadium: Estádio Adelmar da Costa Carvalho (Ilha do Retiro); Attendance: 21,022; Referee: Wallace Nascimento Valente

1 November 2009 33	Náutico	3–2	Sport	Recife
18:30 (UTC-3)	Bruno Mineiro 4'; Carlinhos Bala 32'; Irênio 63'	Report	Vandinho 7'; Wilson 61'	Stadium: Estádio Eládio de Barros Carvalho (Aflitos); Attendance: 19,086; Referee: Sálvio Spínola

7 November 2009 34	Sport	2–3	Cruzeiro	Recife
18:30 (UTC-3)	Wilson 12', 15'	Report	Thiago Ribeiro 19'; Leonardo Silva 52'; Guerrón 66'	Stadium: Estádio Adelmar da Costa Carvalho (Ilha do Retiro); Attendance: 11,458; Referee: Paulo Henrique Bezerra

11 November 2009 35	Palmeiras	2–2	Sport	São Paulo
21:50 (UTC-3)	Deyvid Sacconi 71'; Danilo 84'	Report	Arce 11'; Wilson 16'	Stadium: Estádio Palestra Itália (Parque Antártica); Attendance: 17,133; Referee: Elmo Alves Resende

22 November 2009 36	Sport	0–3	Fluminense	Recife
17:00 (UTC-3)		Report	Zé Antônio 66' (o.g.); Fred 72'; Conca 86'	Stadium: Estádio Adelmar da Costa Carvalho (Ilha do Retiro); Attendance: 9,362; Referee: Wilson Luiz Seneme

29 November 2009 37	Sport	1–2	Internacional	Recife
17:00 (UTC-3)	Vandinho 40'	Report	Kléber 67'; Andrezinho 84'	Stadium: Estádio Adelmar da Costa Carvalho (Ilha do Retiro); Attendance: 4,099; Referee: Paulo César Oliveira

6 December 2009 38	São Paulo	4–0	Sport	São Paulo
17:00 (UTC-3)	Washington 34', 64', 88'; Rogério Ceni 52'	Report		Stadium: Estádio Cícero Pompeu de Toledo (Morumbi); Attendance: 30,937; Referee: Sandro Meira Ricci

==== Record ====
Final Position	Points	Matches	Wins	Draws	Losses	Goals For	Goals Away	Win%
20th	31	38	7	10	21	48	71	27%
