= 2009 Clube Náutico Capibaribe season =

Náutico
2009 season
- Chairman: Maurício Cardoso
- Manager: Roberto Fernandes; Waldemar Lemos; Márcio Bittencourt; Geninho
- Stadium: Estádio dos Aflitos
- Série A: 19th (Relegated)
- Pernambucano: Runners-up
- Copa do Brasil: Round 16
- Top goalscorer: League: Carlinhos Bala (12); All: Gilmar (29)
Home colours	Away colours	Third colours

The 2009 season was Náutico's 109th season in the club's history.

== Statistics ==
=== Overall ===
Games played	66 (22 Pernambucano, 6 Copa do Brasil, 38 Série A)
Games won	26 (14 Pernambucano, 2 Copa do Brasil, 10 Série A)
Games drawn	16 (6 Pernambucano, 2 Copa do Brasil, 8 Série A)
Games lost	24 (2 Pernambucano, 2 Copa do Brasil, 20 Série A)
Goals scored	100
Goals conceded	104
Goal difference	–4
Best results (goal difference)	5–1 (A) v Vitória das Tabocas – Pernambucano – 2009.02.04
Worst result (goal difference)	0–4 (A) v Barueri – Série A – 2009.07.19
Top scorer	Gilmar (28)

Source: Náutico official website

=== Goalscorers ===
Place	Pos.	Nat.	No.	Name	Campeonato Pernambucano	Copa do Brasil	Série A	Total
1	MF	(Brazil)	11	Gilmar	14	5	10	29
2	FW	(Brazil)	10	Carlinhos Bala	9	0	12	21
3	FW	(Brazil)	17	Anderson Lessa	5	0	4	9
4	FW	(Brazil)	9	Bruno Mineiro	0	0	8	8
5	FW	(Brazil)	9	Adriano Magrão	4	0	0	4
6	MF	(Brazil)	7	Derley	0	1	2	3
6	MF	(Brazil)	15	Juliano	2	1	0	3
7	MF	(Brazil)	8	Aílton	0	0	2	2
7	DF	(Brazil)	6	Edson Miolo	2	0	0	2
7	DF	(Brazil)	5	Gladstone	1	0	1	2
7	DF	(Brazil)	7	Johnny	1	1	0	2
8	DF	(Brazil)	6	Asprilla	0	0	1	1
8	DF	(Brazil)	5	Cláudio Luiz	0	0	1	1
8	MF	(Chile)	8	Daniel González	1	0	0	1
8	DF	(Brazil)		Diego Bispo	1	0	0	1
8	MF	(Brazil)		Galiardo	1	0	0	1
8	MF	(Brazil)		Irênio	0	0	1	1
8	FW	(Brazil)		Kuki	1	0	0	1
8	FW	(Brazil)		Márcio	0	0	1	1
8	DF	(Brazil)	6	Michel	0	0	1	1
8		(Brazil)	4	Nilson	0	0	1	1
8		(Brazil)		Patrick	0	0	1	1
8	FW	(Brazil)	9	Somália	1	0	0	1
8		(Brazil)		Vagner	1	0	0	1
				Own goals	0	0	2	2
				Total	44	8	48	100

== Competitions ==
=== Campeonato Pernambucano ===
==== First stage (1817 Constitutionalist Revolution Cup) ====
11 January 2009 1	Náutico	2–2	Cabense	Recife
16:00 (UTC-3)	Anderson Lessa 26'; Vagner 33'	Report	Márcio Machado 20'; Eduardo 31'	Stadium: Estádio Eládio de Barros Carvalho (Aflitos); Attendance: 13,995; Referee: Gledson Leite

14 January 2009 2	Serrano	0–1	Náutico	Serra Talhada
20:30 (UTC-3)			Gilmar 90' (pen.)	Stadium: Estádio Nildo Pereira de Menezes; Referee: Antônio Hora Filho

17 January 2009 3	Náutico	2–2	Salgueiro	Recife
15:30 (UTC-3)	Carlinhos Bala 56'; Gilmar 60' (pen.)		Alisson 62'; Rodrigo Dantas 8'	Stadium: Estádio Eládio de Barros Carvalho (Aflitos)

21 January 2009 4	Ypiranga	3–4	Náutico	Santa Cruz do Capibaribe
20:30 (UTC-3)	Assis 27'; Carlos; Lulinha		Juliano 5'; Somália 18'; Diego Bispo 35'; Anderson Lessa	Stadium: Estádio Otávio Limeira Alves

25 January 2009 5	Náutico	1–0	Central	Recife
18:00 (UTC-3)	Anderson Lessa 60'			Stadium: Estádio Eládio de Barros Carvalho (Aflitos)

28 January 2009 6	Sete de Setembro	1–1	Náutico	Garanhuns
20:30 (UTC-3)	Nêgo Pai 72' (pen.)		Carlinhos Bala	Stadium: Estádio Gigante do Agreste

1 February 2009 7	Náutico	2–2	Santa Cruz	Recife
16:00 (UTC-3)	Gilmar 42'; Carlinhos Bala 49'	Report	Marcelo Ramos 18'; Sandro 61'	Stadium: Estádio Eládio de Barros Carvalho (Aflitos); Referee: Wilson Souza de Mendonça

4 February 2009 8	Vitória das Tabocas	1–5	Náutico	Vitória de Santo Antão
21:00 (UTC-3)	Sandro Miguel 54'		Carlinhos Bala 12', 47'; Galiardo 59'; Gilmar 64'; Kuki 79'	Stadium: Estádio Municipal Severino Cândido Carneiro

7 February 2009 9	Náutico	2–1	Petrolina	Recife
16:00 (UTC-3)	Juliano 79'; Carlinhos Bala 88' (pen.)		Douglas 44'	Stadium: Estádio Eládio de Barros Carvalho (Aflitos)

11 February 2009 10	Náutico	1–0	Porto	Recife
20:30 (UTC-3)	Gilmar 2' (pen.)			Stadium: Estádio Eládio de Barros Carvalho (Aflitos)

14 February 2009 11	Sport	2–0	Náutico	Recife
16:00 (UTC-3)	Durval 31'; Fumagalli 51'			Stadium: Estádio Adelmar da Costa Carvalho (Ilha do Retiro)

==== Second stage (Confederation of the Equator Cup) ====
25 February 2009 1	Cabense	1–4	Náutico	Cabo de Santo Agostinho
21:50 (UTC-3)	Eduardo 63'		Gilmar 25', 87'; Carlinhos Bala 75' (pen.); Adriano Magrão 79'	Stadium: Estádio Gileno de Carli

8 March 2009 2	Náutico	1–0	Serrano	Recife
18:00 (UTC-3)	Gilmar 88'			Stadium: Estádio Eládio de Barros Carvalho (Aflitos)

11 March 2009 3	Salgueiro	1–2	Náutico	Salgueiro
21:45 (UTC-3)	Gílson Costa	Report	Adriano Magrão 63'; Anderson Lessa 74'	Stadium: Estádio Cornélio de Barros

15 March 2009 4	Náutico	3–0	Ypiranga	Recife
16:00 (UTC-3)	Carlinhos Bala 9'; Adriano Magrão 68'; Gilmar 82'			Stadium: Estádio Eládio de Barros Carvalho (Aflitos)

22 March 2009 5	Central	3–2	Náutico	Caruaru
16:00 (UTC-3)	Cicero 40'; Buiu 67'; Fábio Silva 83'		Gilmar 24'; Gladstone 56'	Stadium: Estádio Luiz José de Lacerda (Lacerdão)

26 March 2009 6	Náutico	4–3	Sete de Setembro	Recife
20:30 (UTC-3)	Carlinhos Bala 3'; Gilmar 22' (pen.); Johnny 31'; Adriano Magrão 86'		Nêgo Pai 26'; Marcelo Paraíba 68'; Renatinho 73'	Stadium: Estádio Eládio de Barros Carvalho (Aflitos)

29 March 2009 7	Santa Cruz	1–3	Náutico	Recife
16:00 (UTC-3)	Marcelo Ramos 51'	Report	Edson Miolo 21', 61'; Gilmar 90+1'	Stadium: Estádio José do Rego Maciel (Arruda); Referee: Antônio Hora Filho

2 April 2009 8	Náutico	3–0	Vitória das Tabocas	Recife
15:30 (UTC-3)	Gilmar 10'; González 36'; Anderson Lessa 84'			Stadium: Estádio Eládio de Barros Carvalho (Aflitos)

5 April 2009 9	Petrolina	0–0	Náutico	Petrolina
16:00 (UTC-3)				Stadium: Estádio Paulo de Souza Coelho

12 April 2009 10	Porto	0–1	Náutico	Caruaru
16:00 (UTC-3)			Gilmar 61'	Stadium: Estádio Luiz José de Lacerda (Lacerdão)

19 April 2009 11	Náutico	0–0	Sport	Recife
16:00 (UTC-3)				Stadium: Estádio Eládio de Barros Carvalho (Aflitos); Attendance: 18,759; Referee: Héber Roberto Lopes

==== Record ====
Final Position	Points	Matches	Wins	Draws	Losses	Goals For	Goals Away	Avg%
2nd	48	22	14	6	2	44	23	72%

=== Copa do Brasil ===
==== First round ====
4 March 2009	Moto Club	1–1	Náutico	São Luís
21:50 (UTC-3)	Diego Sousa 48'	Report	Gilmar 64'	Stadium: Estádio Municipal Nhozinho Santos; Attendance: 4,420; Referee: Antonio Santos Nunes

18 March 2009	Náutico	2–0	Moto Club	Recife
21:50 (UTC-3)	Johnny 22'; Gilmar 87'	Report		Stadium: Estádio Eládio de Barros Carvalho (Aflitos); Attendance: 5,067; Referee: Francisco Carlos do Nascimento

==== Second round ====
15 April 2009	Criciúma	2–2	Náutico	Criciúma
21:50 (UTC-3)	Zulu 39'; Kempes 70'	Report	Gilmar 26', 87' (pen.)	Stadium: Estádio Heriberto Hülse; Attendance: 5,799; Referee: Edivaldo Elias da Silva

23 April 2009	Náutico	3–2	Criciúma	Recife
21:30 (UTC-3)	Derley 17'; Gilmar 82' (pen.); Juliano 85'	Report	Kempes 6', 68' (pen.)	Stadium: Estádio Eládio de Barros Carvalho (Aflitos); Attendance: 6,004; Referee: Francisco Almeida Filho

==== Round of 16 ====
29 April 2009	Náutico	0–3	Internacional	Recife
21:50 (UTC-3)		Report	Nilmar 33'; Taison 52'; Marcelo Cordeiro 84'	Stadium: Estádio Eládio de Barros Carvalho (Aflitos); Attendance: 10,207; Referee: Guilherme Cereta de Lima

6 May 2009	Internacional	2–0	Náutico	Porto Alegre
21:50 (UTC-3)	Taison 1'; D'Alessandro 7'	Report		Stadium: Estádio José Pinheiro Borda (Beira-Rio); Attendance: 22,987; Referee: Arilson Bispo da Anunciação

==== Record ====
Final Position	Points	Matches	Wins	Draws	Losses	Goals For	Goals Away	Avg%
15th	8	6	2	2	2	8	10	44%

=== Série A ===
10 May 2009 1	Goiás	3–3	Náutico	Goiânia
18:30 (UTC-3)	Felipe 25', 56'; Júlio César 40'	Report	Asprilla 7'; Carlinhos Bala 63'; Gilmar 84'	Stadium: Estádio do Governo do Estado de Goiás (Serra Dourada); Referee: Jailson Macedo Freitas

17 May 2009 2	Náutico	2–0	Cruzeiro	Recife
18:30 (UTC-3)	Derley 57'; Carlinhos Bala 71'	Report		Stadium: Estádio Eládio de Barros Carvalho (Aflitos); Attendance: 14,127; Referee: Wagner Tardelli

24 May 2009 3	Atlético Paranaense	2–3	Náutico	Curitiba
16:00 (UTC-3)	Wallyson 25', 35'	Report	Gladstone 47'; Anderson Lessa 56', 82'	Stadium: Estádio Joaquim Américo Guimarães (Arena da Baixada); Attendance: 14,172; Referee: Elmo Resende da Cunha

31 May 2009 4	Náutico	1–1	Fluminense	Recife
16:00 (UTC-3)	Gilmar 90+5'	Report	Fred 9'	Stadium: Estádio Eládio de Barros Carvalho (Aflitos); Attendance: 17,781; Referee: Wilson Luiz Seneme

4 June 2009 5	Grêmio	3–0	Náutico	Porto Alegre
21:00 (UTC-3)	Souza 37', 80'; Maxi López 77'	Report		Stadium: Estádio Olímpico Monumental; Attendance: 10,793; Referee: Péricles Bassols Pegado Cortez

14 June 2009 6	Atlético Mineiro	3–0	Náutico	Belo Horizonte
16:00 (UTC-3)	Júnior 13'; Diego Tardelli 64'; Márcio Araújo 83'	Report		Stadium: Estádio Governador Magalhães Pinto (Mineirão); Attendance: 40,820; Referee: Francisco Carlos Nascimento

20 June 2009 7	Náutico	0–1	Coritiba	Recife
18:30 (UTC-3)		Report	Marcos Aurélio 63'	Stadium: Estádio Eládio de Barros Carvalho (Aflitos); Referee: Rodrigo Nunes de Sá

28 June 2009 8	São Paulo	2–0	Náutico	São Paulo
16:00 (UTC-3)	Jean Rolt 46'; Hernanes 85'	Report		Stadium: Estádio Cícero Pompeu de Toledo (Morumbi); Attendance: 7,977; Referee: André Luiz de Freitas Castro

5 July 2009 9	Náutico	0–2	Internacional	Recife
18:30 (UTC-3)		Report	Nilmar 70', 77'	Stadium: Estádio Eládio de Barros Carvalho (Aflitos); Referee: Marcelo de Lima Henrique

11 July 2009 10	Palmeiras	4–1	Náutico	São Paulo
18:30 (UTC-3)	Maurício Ramos 7'; Willians 28'; Armero 72'; Pierre 74'	Report	Márcio 65'	Stadium: Estádio Palestra Itália (Parque Antártica); Attendance: 7,800; Referee: Wagner Tardelli Azevedo

16 July 2009 11	Náutico	1–1	Vitória	Recife
21:00 (UTC-3)	Gilmar 66' (pen.)	Report	Roger 12'	Stadium: Estádio Eládio de Barros Carvalho (Aflitos); Attendance: 13,178; Referee: Paulo César Oliveira

19 July 2009 12	Barueri	4–0	Náutico	Barueri
18:30 (UTC-3)	Val Baiano 19', 40', 71', 77'	Report		Stadium: Arena Barueri; Referee: Héber Roberto Lopes

22 July 2009 13	Náutico	2–2	Botafogo	Recife
21:50 (UTC-3)	Gilmar 58' (pen.), 67'	Report	Juninho 21'; Reinaldo 75'	Stadium: Estádio Eládio de Barros Carvalho (Aflitos); Attendance: 12,721; Referee: José Henrique de Carvalho

26 July 2009 14	Sport	3–3	Náutico	Recife
16:00 (UTC-3)	Fabiano 39'; Durval 53'; Guto 67'	Report	Carlinhos Bala 25', 74'; Gilmar 47' (pen.)	Stadium: Estádio Adelmar da Costa Carvalho (Ilha do Retiro); Attendance: 7,285; Referee: Wagner Tardelli

29 July 2009 15	Náutico	1–2	Santos	Recife
19:30 (UTC-3)	Gilmar 77' (pen.)	Report	Neymar 67'; Rodrigo Souto 90'	Stadium: Estádio Eládio de Barros Carvalho (Aflitos); Attendance: 13,515; Referee: Jaílson Macedo Freitas

2 August 2009 16	Flamengo	1–1	Náutico	Rio de Janeiro
16:00 (UTC-3)	Léo Moura 80'	Report	Gilmar 23'	Stadium: Estádio Jornalista Mário Filho (Maracanã); Attendance: 41,772; Referee: Sandro Meira Ricci

5 August 2009 17	Náutico	1–0	Corinthians	Recife
21:50 (UTC-3)	Gilmar 42'	Report		Stadium: Estádio Eládio de Barros Carvalho (Aflitos); Referee: Arilson Bispo da Anunciação

8 August 2009 18	Náutico	2–1	Santo André	Caruaru
18:30 (UTC-3)	Carlinhos Bala 3', 26'	Report	Gustavo Nery 90+2'	Stadium: Estádio Luiz José de Lacerda (Lacerdão); Referee: Wagner Reway

15 August 2009 19	Avaí	2–1	Náutico	Florianópolis
18:30 (UTC-3)	Eltinho 24'; Marquinhos 89'	Report	Emerson 53' (o.g.)	Stadium: Estádio Aderbal Ramos da Silva (Ressacada); Referee: Wilton Pereira Sampaio

20 August 2009 20	Náutico	2–0	Goiás	Recife
21:00 (UTC-3)	Leandro Euzébio 34' (o.g.); Anderson Lessa 86'	Report		Stadium: Estádio Eládio de Barros Carvalho (Aflitos); Referee: Evandro Rogério Roman

23 August 2009 21	Cruzeiro	4–2	Náutico	Belo Horizonte
18:30 (UTC-3)	Wellington Paulista 1', 36', 90+3'; Fabrício 29'	Report	Gilmar 6'; Carlinhos Bala 90+8'	Stadium: Estádio Governador Magalhães Pinto (Mineirão); Attendance: 14,708; Referee: Pablo dos Santos Alves

29 August 2009 22	Náutico	3–0	Atlético Paranaense	Recife
18:30 (UTC-3)	Carlinhos Bala 32'; Michel 37'; Derley 45+3'	Report		Stadium: Estádio Eládio de Barros Carvalho (Aflitos); Attendance: 14,099; Referee: Alício Pena Júnior

6 September 2009 23	Fluminense	1–1	Náutico	Rio de Janeiro
18:30 (UTC-3)	Conca 27'	Report	Carlinhos Bala 46'	Stadium: Estádio Jornalista Mário Filho (Maracanã); Referee: Sandro Meira Ricci

13 September 2009 24	Náutico	0–2	Grêmio	Recife
18:30 (UTC-3)		Report	Souza 17'; Jonas 26'	Stadium: Estádio Eládio de Barros Carvalho (Aflitos); Attendance: 16,473; Referee: Wilson Luiz Seneme

19 September 2009 25	Náutico	0–0	Atlético Mineiro	Recife
18:30 (UTC-3)		Report		Stadium: Estádio Eládio de Barros Carvalho (Aflitos); Attendance: 14,355; Referee: Héber Roberto Lopes

27 September 2009 26	Coritiba	2–0	Náutico	Curitiba
16:00 (UTC-3)	Rômulo 32'; Marcelinho Paraíba 82'	Report		Stadium: Estádio Major Antônio (Couto Pereira); Attendance: 12,685; Referee: Leonardo Gaciba da Silva

30 September 2009 27	Náutico	1–2	São Paulo	Recife
21:50 (UTC-3)	Bruno Mineiro 12'	Report	Hernanes 59'; Hugo 88'	Stadium: Estádio Eládio de Barros Carvalho (Aflitos); Referee: Francisco Carlos Nascimento

7 October 2009 28	Internacional	3–1	Náutico	Porto Alegre
21:50 (UTC-3)	Alecsandro 22', 90+1'; D'Alessandro 45+2'	Report	Bruno Mineiro 40'	Stadium: Estádio José Pinheiro Borda (Beira-Rio); Referee: Wallace Nascimento Valente

12 October 2009 29	Náutico	3–0	Palmeiras	Recife
16:00 (UTC-3)	Cláudio Luiz 6'; Bruno Mineiro 42', 62'	Report		Stadium: Estádio Eládio de Barros Carvalho (Aflitos); Attendance: 17,027; Referee: Wagner Tardelli Azevedo

18 October 2009 30	Vitória	3–1	Náutico	Salvador
18:30 (UTC-3)	Leandrão 61', 82'; Jackson 90+1'	Report	Bruno Mineiro 46'	Stadium: Estádio Manoel Barradas (Barradão); Referee: André Luiz de Freitas Castro

24 October 2009 31	Náutico	2–1	Barueri	Recife
18:30 (UTC-3)	Bruno Mineiro 26'; Patrick 70'	Report	Márcio Careca 47'	Stadium: Estádio Eládio de Barros Carvalho (Aflitos); Attendance: 13,249; Referee: Leandro Pedro Vuaden

28 October 2009 32	Botafogo	1–0	Náutico	Rio de Janeiro
19:30 (UTC-3)	Juninho 72'	Report		Stadium: Estádio Olímpico João Havelange (Engenhão); Attendance: 6,127; Referee: Leonardo Gaciba da Silva

1 November 2009 33	Náutico	3–2	Sport	Recife
18:30 (UTC-3)	Bruno Mineiro 4'; Carlinhos Bala 32'; Irênio 63'	Report	Vandinho 7'; Wilson 61'	Stadium: Estádio Eládio de Barros Carvalho (Aflitos); Attendance: 19,086; Referee: Sálvio Spínola

7 November 2009 34	Santos	3–1	Náutico	São Paulo
18:30 (UTC-2)	Kléber Pereira 30' (pen.); Neymar 59', 89'	Report	Aílton 68' (pen.)	Stadium: Estádio Municipal Paulo Machado de Carvalho (Pacaembu); Attendance: 15,634; Referee: Wagner Tardelli

15 November 2009 35	Náutico	0–2	Flamengo	Recife
17:00 (UTC-3)		Report	Petković 16'; Adriano 45+1'	Stadium: Estádio Eládio de Barros Carvalho (Aflitos); Attendance: 19,798; Referee: Sandro Meira Ricci

21 November 2009 36	Corinthians	2–3	Náutico	São Paulo
19:30 (UTC-3)	Ronaldo 49'; Elias 70'	Report	Bruno Mineiro 39'; Carlinhos Bala 85'; Aílton 90+2'	Stadium: Estádio Municipal Paulo Machado de Carvalho (Pacaembu); Attendance: 14,154; Referee: Alicio Pena Júnior

29 November 2009 37	Santo André	5–3	Náutico	Santo André
17:00 (UTC-3)	Nunes 3', 74'; Wanderley 18', 36'; Rômulo 57'	Report	Carlinhos Bala 29'; Anderson Lessa 60'; Nílson 79'	Stadium: Estádio Municipal Bruno José Daniel; Referee: Leandro Pedro Vuaden

5 December 2009 38	Náutico	0–1	Avaí	Recife
19:30 (UTC-3)		Report	Eltinho 35'	Stadium: Estádio Eládio de Barros Carvalho (Aflitos); Referee: João Alberto Gomes Duarte

==== Record ====
Final Position	Points	Matches	Wins	Draws	Losses	Goals For	Goals Away	Avg%
19th	38	38	10	8	20	48	71	33%
