= Football records and statistics in Brazil =

This page details football records in Brazil.

== Highest Single-Match Attendances ==
- Most matches with attendance of more than 100,000, ranked by club.
1. Flamengo = 117
2. Vasco = 72
3. Fluminense = 59
4. Botafogo = 43
5. Corinthians = 23
6. Santos = 20
7. Atlético = 19
8. São Paulo = 17
9. Cruzeiro = 15
10. Palmeiras = 13

== Overall ==
These records include state leagues and achievements conquered by expatriate Brazilian footballers.

=== Clubs ===
- Most state leagues titles: 57, ABC
- Most state league consecutive titles: 10, ABC (1932–1941), América Mineiro (1916–1925)
- Most goals scored: 12,691 (up to 2021), Santos
- Most consecutive matches without a victory: 62, Atlético Mogi
- Record win: Botafogo 24–0 Mangueira, Campeonato Carioca (30 May 1909)
- Record win in 21st century: Ulbra 21–0 Shallon, Campeonato Rondoniense (14 May 2006)
- Record away win: Cáceres 0–14 Sorriso, Campeonato Matogrossense (21 March 2010)
- Most goals with both teams scoring: 24, Náutico 21–3 Flamengo Recife, Campeonato Pernambucano (1 July 1945)

=== Individual ===
- Most goals scored: Pelé, 1,279 goals
- Most hat-tricks: Pelé, 96
- Most goals scored in a single match: Dadá Maravilha, 10 goals (Sport Recife 14–0 Santo Amaro, 1976)
- Most free kick goals scored: Zico, 101 goals
- Most decorated player: Dani Alves, 43 titles
- Most appearances: Fábio, 1,256+ matches
- Most matches by one club: Rogério Ceni, 1,237 matches for São Paulo
- Most matches as a captain by a club: Rogério Ceni, 978 matches for São Paulo
- Goalkeeper with most goals scored: Rogério Ceni, 131 goals
- Goalkeeper with most consecutive minutes without conceding a goal: Mazaropi, 1,816 minutes without a goal
- Oldest player appearance: Pedro Ribeiro Lima (Perilima), 66 years (2014 Campeonato Paraibano Second Division)
- Oldest goalscorer: Pedro Ribeiro Lima (Perilima), 58 years (Campinense 5–1 Perilima, 2007)
- Fastest goal: Fred, 3,17 sec (2003)
- Smallest player: Bimbinha: 1.47 m (4 ft 10 in)
- Tallest player: Carlos Miguel, Fabão: 2.04 m (6 ft 8 in)

== Campeonato Brasileiro ==
Records in this section refer to (Level 1) i.e. Taça Brasil from its founding in 1959 through to 1968, the Torneio Roberto Gomes Pedrosa from its founding in 1967 through to 1970, and the Campeonato Brasileiro Série A or Brasileirão from 1971 to the present. Some records relating to team performances are divided into records in the round-robin era (from 2003 to the present) and the championships before it.

=== Titles ===
- Most Brazilian national titles: 12
  - Palmeiras (1960, 1967 (TB), 1967 (R), 1969, 1972, 1973, 1993, 1994, 2016, 2018, 2022, 2023)
- Most consecutive Brazilian national titles: 5:
  - Santos (1961, 1962, 1963, 1964, 1965)

=== Top-flight Appearances ===
- Most appearances: 63
  - Grêmio
  - Santos
- Most appearances (Taça Brasil era): 9
  - Grêmio
- Most appearances (Campeonato Brasileiro era): 56
  - Flamengo
- Most consecutive seasons in top-flight: 56
  - Flamengo (1970–2026)
- Fewest appearances in top-flight (Taça Brasil era): 1, joint record:
  - Auto Esporte (PB) (1959)
  - Ferroviário (MA) (1959)
  - Hercílio Luz (1959)
  - Manufatora (1959)
  - Estrela do Mar (PB) (1960)
  - Paula Ramos (1960)
  - Comercial (PR) (1962)
  - Rio Branco (RJ) (1962)
  - Defelê (1963)
  - Cruzeiro do Sul (DF) (1964)
  - Eletrovapo (RJ) (1965)
  - Guanabara (DF) (1965)
  - Olímpico (SC) (1965)
  - Siderúrgica (1965)
  - Anápolis (1966)
  - Inter de Lages (1966)
  - América (CE) (1967)
  - América de Propriá (1967)
  - Perdigão (1967)
  - Olímpico (AM) (1968)
- Fewest appearances in top-flight (Campeonato Brasileiro era): 1, joint record:
  - Vitória-ES (1977)
  - Noroeste (1978)
  - ASA (1979)
  - Caldense (1979)
  - Colatina (1979)
  - Francana (1979)
  - Guará (1979)
  - Itumbiara (1979)
  - Novo Hamburgo (1979)
  - Operário-PR (1979)
  - Potiguar (1979)
  - São Bento (1979)
  - Internacional de Santa Maria (1982)
  - Taguatinga (1982)
  - Ferroviária (1983)
  - Juventus (1983)
  - Auto Esporte-PI (1984)
  - Catuense (1984)
  - Corumbaense (1985)
  - Sobradinho (1986)
  - Brasiliense (2005)
  - Ipatinga (2008)
  - Mirassol (2025)

=== Wins ===
- Most wins in the top-flight overall: São Paulo, 683
- Most wins in a season:
- Most wins in a top-flight season (before 2003): 25, Palmeiras (1973)
- Most wins in a top-flight season: 31, Cruzeiro (2003)
- Most consecutive wins in the top flight:
- Most consecutive wins:
- Most consecutive wins from the start of a season:
- Most consecutive wins from the start of a season in the top flight:
- Most consecutive away wins:
- Fewest wins in a season (1967–2003): 0, joint record:
  - Ferroviário-PR (1967)
  - Campinense (1975)
  - Piauí (1979)
  - Chapecoense (1979)
  - Guará (1979)
  - Maranhão (1980)
  - Desportiva (1981)
  - Uberaba (1981)
  - River (1982)
  - Nacional (1982, 1984)
  - Atlético-PR (1982)
  - Galícia (1983)
  - Fortaleza (1983)
  - Moto Club (1983)
  - Catuense (1984)
  - Brasília (1984)
  - Remo (1986)
- Fewest wins in a season (after 2003): 1, Chapecoense, 2021
- 100% home win record in a season:

=== Draws ===
- Most draws overall in the top flight: São Paulo, 459
- Most draws in a season:
- Most consecutive draws:

=== Losses ===
- Most losses overall in the top flight: Botafogo, 503
- Most losses in a season: América-RN, 29, 2007
- Fewest losses: Malutrom, 1

=== Points ===
- Most points overall in the top flight: 2859, Grêmio
- Most points in a season (before 2003):
  - 3 points for a win: 70, Vasco da Gama (1997)
  - 2 points for a win: 62, Palmeiras (1973)
- Most points in a season (after 2003):100, Cruzeiro (2003)
- Most points in a season for a top-flight team: 100, Cruzeiro (2003)
- Fewest points in a season (before 2003): 0, joint record
  - River (1982)
  - Brasília (1984)
- Fewest points in a season (after 2003): 15, Chapecoense (2021)

=== Games without a loss ===
- Most consecutive Brasileirão games without a loss:42, Botafogo-RJ, 1977–1978

=== Games without a win ===
- Most consecutive Brasileirão games without a win: 20, Nacional-AM, 1981–1985

=== Fixtures ===
- Most played Brasileirão fixture:

=== Appearances ===
- Most career Brasileirão appearances: 744 games, Fábio
- Most career Brasileirão appearances by an outfield player: 370, Zinho
- Most career Brasileirão appearances at one club: 458 games, Rogério Ceni (São Paulo)
- Most career top flight Brasileirão appearances at one club: 458 games, Rogério Ceni (São Paulo)
- Most career Brasileirão appearances for consecutive games:
- Oldest player in top division: Zé Roberto (Palmeiras), 43 years and 141 days (27 November 2017)
- Youngest player in top division: Jô (Corinthians), 16 years and 121 days (19 July 2003)

=== Goals ===
==== Individual ====
- Most career Brasileirão goals: 190, Roberto Dinamite
- Most career top-flight goals:190, Roberto Dinamite
- Most goals in a season: 34, Washington (2004)
- Most goals in a game: 6, Edmundo (for Vasco da Gama v. União São João, 11 September 1997)
- Most goals in a top-flight game: 6, Edmundo (for Vasco da Gama v. União São João, 11 September 1997)
- Fastest goal: 8 seconds, Nivaldo (for Náutico v. Atlético Mineiro, 1989)
- Fastest goal on a Brasileirão debut:
- Fastest hat-trick (time between first and third goals):
- Fastest goal by a substitute:
- Most own goals in one season:
- Most hat-tricks in one season:
- Most career hat-tricks:11, Roberto Dinamite
- Longest goalkeeping run without conceding a goal:
- Youngest goalscorer: 16 years and 157 days, Jo Alves

==== Team ====
- Most Brasileirão goals scored in a season (after 2003): 103, Santos (2004)
- Most Brasileirão goals scored in a season (before 2003): 69, Vasco da Gama (1997)
- Fewest Brasileirão goals scored in a season (before 2003): 2 goals, joint record
  - Colatina (1979)
  - Guará (1979)
  - Americano (1980)
  - Itabaiana (1982)
  - Atlético-PR (1982)
  - Galícia (1983)
  - Ferroviário (1984)
- Fewest Brasileirão goals scored in a season (after 2003): 22 goals
  - Náutico (2013)
- Most Brasileirão goals conceded in a season (before 2003): 51, joint record
  - Santa Cruz (2000)
  - Botafogo (2001)
  - Atlético Mineiro (2002)
- Most Brasileirão goals conceded in a season (after 2003): 92, joint record
  - Bahia (2003)
  - Paysandu (2005)
- Fewest Brasileirão goals conceded in a season (before 2003): 3, joint record
  - Guarani (1979)
  - Botafogo-SP (1983)
  - Uberlândia (1984)
- Fewest Brasileirão goals conceded in a season (after 2003): 19, São Paulo (2007)

=== Attendances ===
- Record attendance: 155,523; Flamengo 3 x 0 Santos (Maracanã, 29 May 1983)

=== Scorelines ===
Following is the list with the main scorelines occurred in the Campeonato Brasileiro:

#	Level	Home	Score	Away	Venue	Date
1	Série D	Brasiliense	10–0	Interporto	Serejão	10 July 2023
2	Série A	Corinthians	10–1	Tiradentes-PI	Canindé	9 February 1983
3	Série A	Vasco da Gama	9–0	Tuna Luso	São Januário	19 February 1984
3	Série B	Paulista	9–0	Paysandu	Jayme Cintra	18 November 2006
3	Série C	América Mineiro	9–0	Jataiense	Independência	20 August 2006
3	Série D	São Caetano	0–9	Pelotas	Anacleto Campanella	24 October 2020
3	Série D	Operário-MT	9–0	Real Ariquemes	Dito Souza	15 July 2023
8	Série D	Trem	10–2	Náutico-RR	Zerão	6 June 2022
9	Série D	Plácido de Castro	9–1	Vila Aurora	Arena da Floresta	10 September 2011
9	Série D	ABC	9–1	Caucaia	Frasqueirão	9 August 2021

- Record win in top division: Corinthians 10–1 Tiradentes-PI (9 February 1983)
- Record away win in top division: Bahia 0–7 Cruzeiro (14 December 2003)
- Most goals in a top division game: 12, Ceará 7–5 Ríver (1962)

=== Disciplinary ===
- Most red cards in a single match: 14 (Goiás 3-1 Cruzeiro, October 4, 1979)
- Fastest red card: 12 seconds, Zé Carlos

=== Promotion and change in position ===
- Lowest finish by the previous season's champions:
  - Coritiba: 44th out of 48 clubs, 1986.
- Highest finish by a promoted club:
  - São Caetano: Runners-up, 2001
- Lowest finish by the previous season's champions (since 2003):
  - Fluminense: 15° out of 20 clubs, 2013.
- Highest finish by a promoted club (since 2003):
  - Grêmio: Runners-up, 2023

== Copa do Brasil ==
=== Team ===
- Most wins: 6, Cruzeiro (1993, 1996, 2000, 2003, 2017, 2018)
- Most consecutive wins: 2, Cruzeiro (2017, 2018)
- Most appearances: 33 seasons, Atlético Mineiro and Vitória
- Most appearances without winning: 33 seasons, Vitória
- Biggest win: Atlético Mineiro 11–0 Caiçara (28 February 1991)
- Most goals in a final: 8 goals, 2001 (Grêmio v Corinthians)
- Most goals by a winning side: 6 goals, Atlético Mineiro (2021)
- Most goals by a losing side: 3 goals, joint record; Corinthians (2001, 2008) and Coritiba (2011)
- Most defeats in a final: 5, Flamengo

== Most successful clubs overall (by total of honors) ==
Club	Domestic				South America							Worldwide				Total
Club	SA	CB	SCB / CDC / CBF / CCCB / CBD / CCE	Total	CL	CS / CM / CC	RS	SS / SACC	CMC / CO / SM	CSC	Total	CWC	RSI / IC	TORCM / CR	Total	Total
(Rio de Janeiro (state)) Flamengo	8	5	4	17	4	1	1	-	1	-	7	-	1	-	1	25
(São Paulo (state)) Palmeiras	12	4	2	18	3	1	1	-	-	-	5	-	-	1	1	24
(São Paulo (state)) São Paulo	6	1	1	8	3	2	2	1	1	-	9	1	2	-	3	20
(São Paulo (state)) Santos	8	1	-	9	3	1	1	-	-	-	5	-	3	-	3	17
(São Paulo (state)) Corinthians	7	4	2	13	1	-	1	-	-	-	2	2	-	-	2	17
(Minas Gerais) Cruzeiro	4	6	-	10	2	-	1	2	2	-	7	-	-	-	0	17
(Rio Grande do Sul) Grêmio	2	5	1	8	3	-	2	-	-	-	5	-	1	-	1	14
(Rio Grande do Sul) Internacional	3	1	-	4	2	1	2	-	-	1	6	1	-	-	1	11
(Minas Gerais) Atlético Mineiro	3	2	2	7	1	2	1	-	-	-	4	-	-	-	0	11
(Rio de Janeiro (state)) Vasco da Gama	4	1	-	5	1	1	-	1	-	-	3	-	-	1	1	9
(Rio de Janeiro (state)) Fluminense	4	1	-	5	1	-	1	-	-	-	2	-	-	1	1	8
(Paraná (state)) Athletico Paranaense	1	1	-	2	-	2	-	-	-	1	3	-	-	-	0	5
(Rio de Janeiro (state)) Botafogo	3	-	-	3	1	1	-	-	-	-	2	-	-	-	0	5
Bahia	2	-	-	2	-	-	-	-	-	-	0	-	-	-	0	2
(Pernambuco) Sport	1	1	-	2	-	-	-	-	-	-	0	-	-	-	0	2
(Santa Catarina (state)) Chapecoense	-	-	-	0	-	1	-	-	-	-	1	-	-	-	0	1
(Paraná (state)) Coritiba	1	-	-	1	-	-	-	-	-	-	0	-	-	-	0	1
(São Paulo (state)) Guarani	1	-	-	1	-	-	-	-	-	-	0	-	-	-	0	1
(Santa Catarina (state)) Criciúma	-	1	-	1	-	-	-	-	-	-	0	-	-	-	0	1
(Rio Grande do Sul) Juventude	-	1	-	1	-	-	-	-	-	-	0	-	-	-	0	1
(São Paulo (state)) Paulista	-	1	-	1	-	-	-	-	-	-	0	-	-	-	0	1
(São Paulo (state)) Santo André	-	1	-	1	-	-	-	-	-	-	0	-	-	-	0	1
(Rio de Janeiro (state)) America	-	-	1	1	-	-	-	-	-	-	0	-	-	-	0	1
(Paraná (state)) Grêmio Maringá	-	-	1	1	-	-	-	-	-	-	0	-	-	-	0	1
(São Paulo (state)) Paulistano	-	-	1	1	-	-	-	-	-	-	0	-	-	-	0	1
(Pará) Paysandu	-	-	1	1	-	-	-	-	-	-	0	-	-	-	0	1

The figures in gold represent the current holders of the competition (were competition is still active).

== Managers ==
- Most titles wins: 9, Telê Santana
- Most Brasileirão title wins: 5, joint record; Lula, Vanderlei Luxemburgo
- Most Copa do Brasil wins: 3, Luiz Felipe Scolari
- Most Intercontinental Cup / FIFA Club World Cup wins: 2, joint record; Lula, Telê Santana
- Most Copa Libertadores wins: 2, joint record; Lula, Telê Santana, Luiz Felipe Scolari, Paulo Autuori
- Most Recopa Sudamericana de Campeones Intercontinentales / Supercopa Sudamericana wins: 1, Antônio Fernandes
- Most Copa CONMEBOL / Copa Mercosur / Copa Sudamericana wins: 2, Émerson Leão
- Longest-serving manager: Amadeu Teixeira, 53 years (1955–2008) for América (AM)

== See also ==
- List of football clubs by competitive honours won
