= Immediate Geographic Region of Varginha =

Urban administrative region in Minas Gerais, Brazil

Immediate Geographic Region of Varginha, in the state of Minas Gerais, Brazil.

The Immediate Geographic Region of Varginha is one of the 10 immediate geographic regions in the Intermediate Geographic Region of Varginha, one of the 70 immediate geographic regions in the Brazilian state of Minas Gerais and one of the 509 of Brazil, created by the National Institute of Geography and Statistics (IBGE) in 2017.

== Municipalities ==
It comprises 5 municipalities:

- Cordislândia
- Elói Mendes
- Monsenhor Paulo
- São Gonçalo do Sapucaí
- Varginha

== See also ==
- List of Intermediate and Immediate Geographic Regions of Minas Gerais
