= Federação Pernambucana de Futebol =

Sporting federation

- Formation: 16 June 1915; 111 years ago
- Type: List of international sport federations
- Headquarters: Recife, Pernambuco, Brazil
- Official language: Portuguese
- President: Evandro Carvalho
- Website: fpf-pe.com.br

The Federação Pernambucana de Futebol, once named Liga Esportiva Pernambucana, also known by the acronym FPF, organizes and administers the Campeonato Pernambucano, the Copa Pernambuco, the Campeonato Pernambucano Série A2 and the Campeonato Pernambucano Série A3). It was founded in 1915. Carlos Alberto Oliveira was the president of FPF until his death on August 29, 2011 being replaced by Evandro Carvalho.

== History ==
The original founders of the Federation were:

- América (previously known as João de Barros Futebol Clube)
- Centro Sportivo do Peres
- Flamengo (Recife)
- Santa Cruz
- Torre (previously known as Agros Sport Club de Socorro)

The following clubs also share the status of founders:

- Sport Club do Recife,
- Clube Náutico Capibaribe,
- Ferroviário Esporte Clube do Recife (previously known as Associação Atlética Great-Western, currently known as Clube Ferroviário do Recife),
- Íbis Sport Club, and
- Auto Esporte Clube.

In the Founding Assembly the following sport leagues were present:

- Olindense de Desportos,
- Desportiva Caruaruense,
- Desportiva Garanhuense, and
- Desportiva de Pesqueira.

== Presidents ==
Liga Sportiva Pernambucana

- Aristeu Acioli Lins – 1915
- Alcebíades Braga – 1915
- Henrique Jacques – 1915
- Melchior do Amaral – 1915 – 1917

Liga Pernambucana de Desportos Terrestre

- Manoel da Silva Guimarães – 1918 – 1919
- João Reinaldo da Costa Lima – 1919 – 1920
- João Duarte Dias – 1920
- Loyo Neto – 1920 – 1921
- Artur Campelo – 1922 – 1924
- Cícero Brasileiro de Melo – 1925 – 1926
- Júlio de Melo Filho – 1926 – 1927
- Renato Silveira – 1927 – 1928 – 1929 – 1930
- Maviael do Prado – 1928
- Carlos Rios – 1929 – 1930

Federação Pernambucana de Desportos

- Maviael do Prado – 1930 – 1935
- Sebastião Maciel – 1936 – 1937
- Edgar Moury Fernandes – 1938
- Tavares Buril – 1938 – 1939 – 1940 – 1941
- Sidrack Correia de Oliveira – 1940
- Alfredo Ramos – 1941 – 1943
- Edson Moury Fernandes – 1943 – 1945
- Nilo de Brito Bastos – 1946 – 1947
- Osvaldo Salsa – 1947
- Leopoldo Casado – 1947 – 1948
- José Rêgo Vieria – 1949 – 1950
- Sigismundo Cabral de Melo – 1951 – 1953
- Évio de Abreu e Lima – 1953 – 1954

Federação Pernambucana de Futebol

- Rubem Rodriges Moreira – 1954 – 1982
- Dilson Prado Cavalcanti – 1982 – 1985
- Carlos Frederico Gomes de Oliveira – 1985 – 1995
- Carlos Alberto Gomes de Oliveira – 1995 – 2011
- Evandro Barros Carvalho – 2011 –

Source:FPF

== Honours ==
National Champions
Competitions	Teams	Seasons
Campeonato Brasileiro Série A	Sport	1987
Campeonato Brasileiro Série B	Sport	1990
Campeonato Brasileiro Série C	Santa Cruz	2013
Campeonato Brasileiro Série C	Náutico	2019
Campeonato Brasileiro Série D	Retrô	2024
Copa do Brasil	Sport	2008

== Current clubs ==
As of 25 April 2026

=== 2026 ===
==== Brasileirão ====
Club	City	Position
Série B
Náutico	Recife	In the Group stage
Sport	Recife	In the Group stage
Série C
Santa Cruz	Recife	In the Group stage
Série D
Central	Caruaru	In the Group stage
Decisão	Goiana	In the Group stage
Maguary	Bonito	In the Group stage
Retrô	Camaragibe	In the Group stage

==== Brasileirão feminino ====
Club	City	Position
Série A2
Sport	Recife	In the Group stage
Série A3
Ipojuca	Ipojuca	Eliminated (Group stage)

==== State leagues ====
Club	Status
Campeonato Pernambucano
Sport	Winners
Náutico	Runners-up
Retrô	Third place

==== Other competitions ====
Club	Status
Copa do Brasil
Maguary	Eliminated (Second stage)
Retrô	Eliminated (Second stage)
Santa Cruz	Eliminated (Second stage)
Sport	Eliminated (Fourth stage)
Copa do Nordeste
Retrô	In the Group stage
Sport	In the Quarter-finals
Copa do Brasil Feminina
Ipojuca	In the First stage
Sport	In the Second stage

=== 2025 ===
==== State leagues ====
Club	Status
Campeonato Pernambucano Feminino
Sport	Winners
Ipojuca	Runners-up
Náutico	Third place
Campeonato Pernambucano A2
Vitória das Tabocas	Winners
América	Runners-up
Centro Limoeirense	Third place
