= João Amaral =

João Amaral may refer to:

- Amaral (1954–2024), Brazilian footballer
- Andrade (footballer, born 1981), Brazilian footballer
- João Amaral (footballer, born 1991), Portuguese footballer
- João Maria Ferreira do Amaral (1803–1849), Portuguese military officer and politician
