= Fumagalli =

Brazilian footballer (born 1977)

Personal information
- Full name: José Fernando Fumagalli
- Date of birth: 5 October 1977 (age 49)
- Place of birth: Monte Alto, Brazil
- Height: 1.76 m (5 ft 9 in)
- Position: Attacking midfielder

Youth career
- 1995–1996: Ferroviária
- 1997: Santos

Senior career*
Years	Team	Apps	(Gls)
1995–1996	Ferroviária		
1997–2000	Santos	9	(1)
1998	→ Verdy Kawasaki (loan)	10	(5)
1999	→ América-SP (loan)	10	(0)
2000–2001	Guarani	46	(16)
2002–2003	Corinthians	18	(0)
2004	Santo André	0	(0)
2004	Marília	16	(1)
2004	→ FC Seoul (loan)	11	(0)
2005	Santo André	0	(0)
2005	Fortaleza	34	(8)
2006–2010	Sport Recife	72	(24)
2007–2008	→ Al-Rayyan (loan)	28	(3)
2009–2010	→ Vasco da Gama (loan)	25	(3)
2011	Americana	30	(8)
2012–2018	Guarani	107	(32)
2013	→ Santa Cruz-PA (loan)	6	(5)
Total		422	(106)
- * Club domestic league appearances and goals

José Fernando Fumagalli (born 5 October 1977 in Monte Alto, São Paulo), known simply as Fumagalli, is a Brazilian retired footballer who played as an attacking midfielder.

A Santos youth graduate, Fumagalli spent most of his professional career with Guarani.

== Career statistics ==
As of 25 April 2018

Club	Season	League			State League		Cup		Continental		Other		Total	
Club	Season	Division	Apps	Goals	Apps	Goals	Apps	Goals	Apps	Goals	Apps	Goals	Apps	Goals
Santos	1997	Série A	2	0	3	2	0	0	—		—		5	2
Santos	1998	Série A	2	0	0	0	0	0	—		—		2	0
Santos	1999	Série A	5	1	—		0	0	—		—		5	1
Santos	Subtotal		9	1	3	2	0	0	—		—		12	3
Verdy Kawasaki (loan)	1998	J.League	10	5	—		3	1	—		0	0	13	6
América-SP (loan)	1999	Paulista A2	—		10	0	—		—		—		10	0
Guarani	2000	Série A	22	8	19	2	3	1	—		—		44	11
Guarani	2001	Série A	24	8	13	3	3	0	—		—		40	11
Guarani	Subtotal		46	16	32	5	6	1	—		—		84	22
Corinthians	2002	Série A	0	0	—		0	0	—		9 (Note: Appearance(s) in Torneio Rio – São Paulo)	1	9	1
Corinthians	2003	Série A	18	0	4	1	—		6 (Note: Five appearances in Copa Libertadores, one appearance in Copa Sudamericana)	0	—		28	1
Corinthians	Subtotal		18	0	4	1	0	0	6	0	9	1	37	2
Santo André	2004	Série B	0	0	11	5	0	0	—		—		11	5
Marília	2004	Série B	16	1	—		—		—		—		16	1
FC Seoul	2004	K League	11	0	—		—		—		—		11	0
Santo André	2005	Série B	0	0	17	3	—		2 (Note: Appearance(s) in Copa Libertadores)	0	—		19	3
Fortaleza	2005	Série A	34	8	—		—		—		—		34	8
Sport	2006	Série B	36	18	17	4	—		—		—		53	22
Sport	2007	Série A	9	2	16	6	3	2	—		—		28	10
Sport	2008	Série A	17	3	—		—		—		—		17	3
Sport	2009	Série A	10	1	15	4	—		6	0	—		31	5
Sport	Subtotal		72	24	48	14	3	2	6	0	—		129	40
Al-Rayyan (loan)	2007–08	Qatar Stars League	28	3	—		—		—		—		28	3
Vasco da Gama (loan)	2009	Série B	9	1	—		—		—		—		9	1
Vasco da Gama (loan)	2010	Série A	16	2	4	0	1	0	—		—		21	2
Vasco da Gama (loan)	Subtotal		25	3	4	0	1	0	—		—		30	3
Americana	2011	Série B	30	8	19	4	—		—		—		49	12
Guarani	2012	Série B	12	1	20	9	2	1	—		—		34	11
Guarani	2013	Série C	14	3	4	1	—		—		—		18	4
Guarani	2014	Série C	16	5	17	3	2	0	—		—		35	8
Guarani	2015	Série C	18	9	17	6	—		—		—		35	15
Guarani	2016	Série C	23	9	15	6	—		—		—		38	15
Guarani	2017	Série B	24	5	19	3	—		—		—		43	8
Guarani	2018	Série B	0	0	11	1	—		—		—		11	1
Guarani	Subtotal		107	32	103	29	4	1	—		—		214	62
Santa Cruz-PA (loan)	2013	Paraense	—		6	5	—		—		—		6	5
Career total			406	93	257	68	17	5	14	0	9	1	703	167

== Honours ==
Santos

- Torneio Rio-São Paulo: 1997

América-SP

- Campeonato Paulista Série A2: 1999

Corinthians

- Copa do Brasil: 2002
- Torneio Rio-São Paulo: 2002
- Campeonato Paulista: 2003

Sport

- Campeonato Pernambucano: 2006, 2007, 2009

Vasco da Gama

- Campeonato Brasileiro Série B: 2009

Guarani

- Campeonato Paulista Série A2: 2018
