= Anderson Lessa =

Brazilian footballer (born 1989)

Personal information
- Full name: José Anderson de Oliveira Lessa
- Date of birth: July 26, 1989 (age 37)
- Place of birth: Recife, Brazil
- Height: 1.70 m (5 ft 7 in)
- Position: Striker

Team information
- Current team: Central

Youth career
- 2007–2008: Náutico

Senior career*
Years	Team	Apps	(Gls)
2008–2009	Náutico		
2010–2012	Cruzeiro		
2010	→ Náutico (loan)		
2011–2012	→ Avaí (loan)		
2012	→ Villa Nova-MG (loan)		
2013	XV de Piracicaba		
2013	Cuiabá		
2014	ASA		
2015–2016	Salgueiro		
2017	Central		
2017	Bragantino		
2018–2019	Bangu		
2019–2020	Al-Nasr Kuwait		
2020–2021	Bangu		
2020	→ Água Santa (loan)		
2021	Portuguesa		
2022–	Audax-RJ		
2023–	Central		
- * Club domestic league appearances and goals as of October 16, 2013

José Anderson de Oliveira Lessa (born July 26, 1989), best known as Anderson Lessa, is a Brazilian professional footballer who plays as a striker for Central.

== Career ==
Anderson began his career in Náutico, which played for two years and was the top goalscorer in the league of Pernambuco sub 20 with 32 goals in 28 games. In 2010, he signed a contract with Cruzeiro. In September he went on loan to former club Náutico, breaking his knee ligament in his second game as a starter. He returned to Cruzeiro to recuperate from his injury. On 11 July 2011, he signed a season-long loan deal with Avaí.

== Career statistics ==
(Correct as of January 04, 2018)

Appearances and goals by club, season and competition
Club	Season	State League		Brazilian Série A		Copa do Brasil		Copa Sudamericana		Total	
Club	Season	Apps	Goals	Apps	Goals	Apps	Goals	Apps	Goals	Apps	Goals
Náutico	2008	–				–		–			
Náutico	2009			13	4	–		–			
Cruzeiro	2010	4	2	–		–		–		4	2
Avaí (loan)	2011	–		3	0	–		–		3	0
Bangu	2018	7	4	0	0	–		–		7	4
Total				16	4	0	0	0	0		
