= Moacir (footballer, born 1986) =

Brazilian footballer

Personal information
- Full name: Moacir Costa da Silva
- Date of birth: 14 February 1986 (age 40)
- Place of birth: Recife, Brazil
- Height: 1.84 m (6 ft 0 in)
- Position: Defensive midfielder

Team information
- Current team: Caxias

Youth career
- –2005: Sport Recife
- 2005–2006: Central

Senior career*
Years	Team	Apps	(Gls)
2007	Central	2	(0)
2008–2009	Sport Recife	45	(1)
2010–2011	Corinthians	27	(0)
2011–2013	Sport Recife	89	(3)
2013	Paraná	26	(2)
2014	Coritiba	9	(0)
2015	→ Boa Esporte (loan)	32	(3)
2015–2016	Fortaleza	10	(0)
2016	Luverdense	15	(0)
2016	Novorizontino	7	(0)
2017	Luverdense	31	(1)
2018	Ferroviária	14	(3)
2018	→ Vila Nova (loan)	33	(0)
2019–2020	Atlético Goianiense	51	(2)
2020	CRB	15	(0)
2021	Criciúma	16	(0)
2021–2022	Vila Nova	50	(0)
2022	Figueirense	14	(0)
2023–	Caxias	50	(0)
- * Club domestic league appearances and goals as of 05:18, 29 March 2020 (UTC)

Moacir Costa da Silva (born 14 February 1986 in Recife), simply known as Moacir, is a Brazilian footballer who plays for Caxias. Mainly a defensive midfielder, he can also play as a right back.

== Club career ==
Moacir joined Central after being released by Sport's youth team. He turned professional with the team in 2006. In 2008 he played in Série C and Copa do Brasil with the club. He was spotted by Sport and resigned with the club in June 2008. Moacir retrained as a right-back whilst at Sport, and featured for them in the 2008 Copa do Brasil final and in the 2009 Copa Libertadores.

Moacir signed for Corinthians in 2010 in an arrangement which saw the transfer of all his rights to the club. He negotiated release from his contract in May 2011 and resigned for Sport Recife.

Released by Sport in 2013, Moacir signed for Paraná. Then in 2014 for Coritiba. He missed a large part of the season after a heart condition was discovered whilst on trial at Figueirense. In 2015, recovered, he was loaned to Boa Esporte. In April 2015 he signed for Fortaleza. He was released in May 2016 after seeing little game time with the club. A month later he signed for Luverdense.

In 2017 Moacir signed for Grêmio Novorizontino for the first half of the season, and then for a second spell at Luverdense to play in Série B in April. In 2018 he moved to Ferroviária and then moved to Vila Nova to play Série B in the second half of the season.

For 2019 Moacir signed for Atlético Goianiense.

== Honours ==
Sport

- Campeonato Pernambucano: 2009

Fortaleza

- Campeonato Cearense: 2016

Luverdense

- Copa Verde: 2017
