= Pedro Ribeiro Lima =

Brazilian footballer

Personal information
- Full name: Pedro Ribeiro de Lima
- Date of birth: 21 July 1948 (age 78)
- Place of birth: Araruna, Brazil
- Position: Midfielder

Senior career*
Years	Team	Apps	(Gls)
1999–2014	Perilima		(1)
2007	Leonel		
- * Club domestic league appearances and goals as of 23 October 2023

Pedro Ribeiro Lima (born 21 July 1948), also known as Seu Pedro and Pedro da Sorda, is a Brazilian former professional footballer who played as a midfielder. He is considered the oldest professional player to play a professional match, and the oldest to score a goal in Brazilian football.

== Personal life ==
Businessman in a branch of typical Paraíba biscuits called "Sorda", Pedro founded the Associação Desportiva Perilima, to satisfy his desire to become a football player, counting on the factory's own employees and his sons as players to complete the team.

== Career ==
Pedro played for several years in the Campeonato Paraibano and Campeonato Paraibano Second Division, almost always suffering defeats and defeats in Perilima games, which, due to the lack of other professional clubs in Paraíba at the time, always completed the editions regardless of the poor results obtained.

His greatest achievement as a player came in 2007, when after a penalty conceded by friend and player Nêgo Pai, he had the opportunity to become the oldest Brazilian player to score a goal in professional football, at 58 years of age, in the match against Campinense. The goalkeeper Jailson, who years later would be champion and stand out with Palmeiras, was the one who conceded the goal, his only one in professional football. Still in 2007, he also played for Leonel, another precarious football club in Campina Grande.

In 2014, his last performance, he became the oldest player to participate in a professional football match in Brazil, at 66 years old.

== See also ==
- Football records and statistics in Brazil
