= São Gonçalo do Sapucaí =

- Municipality
- Municipality of São Gonçalo do Sapucaí
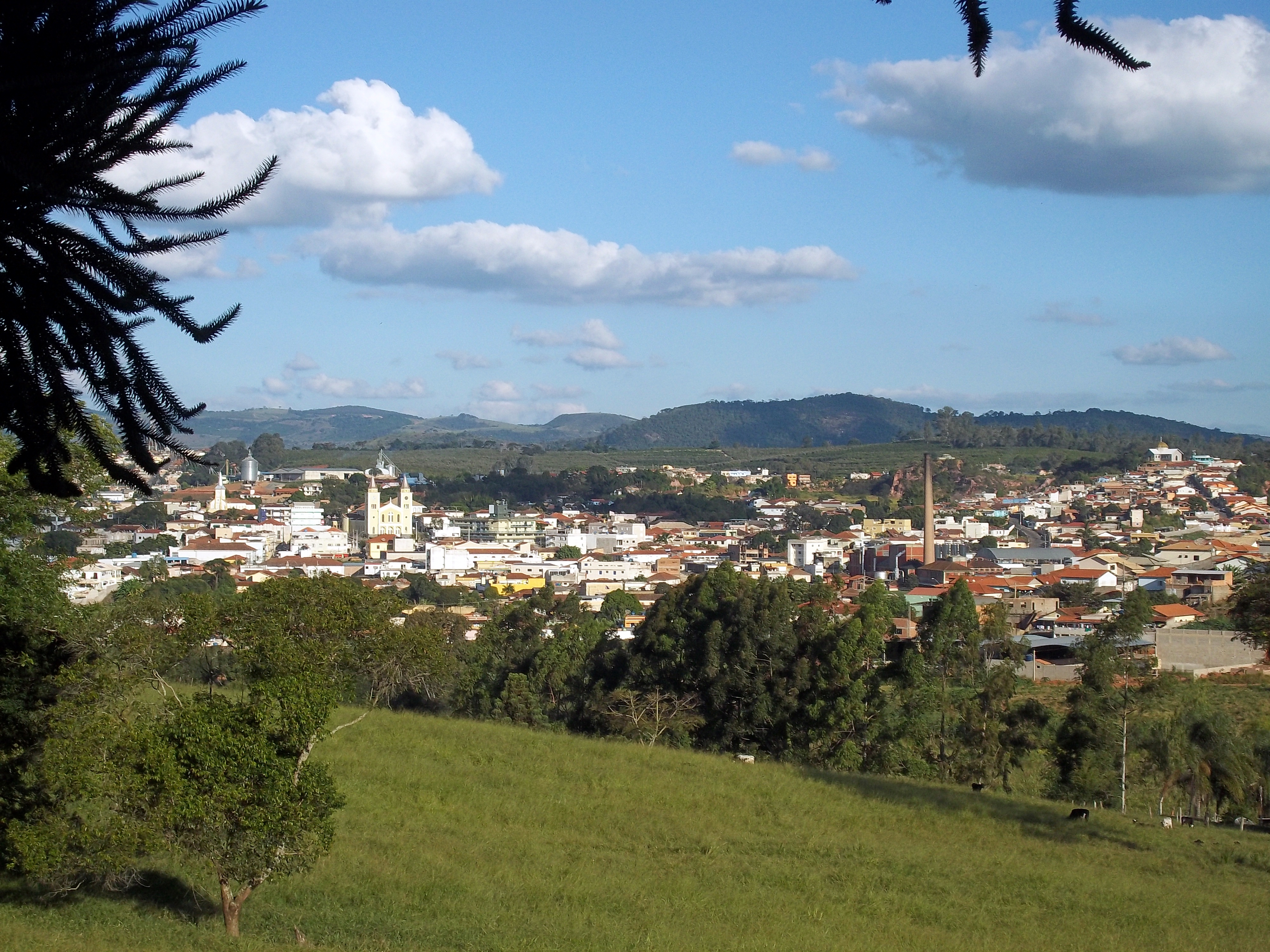

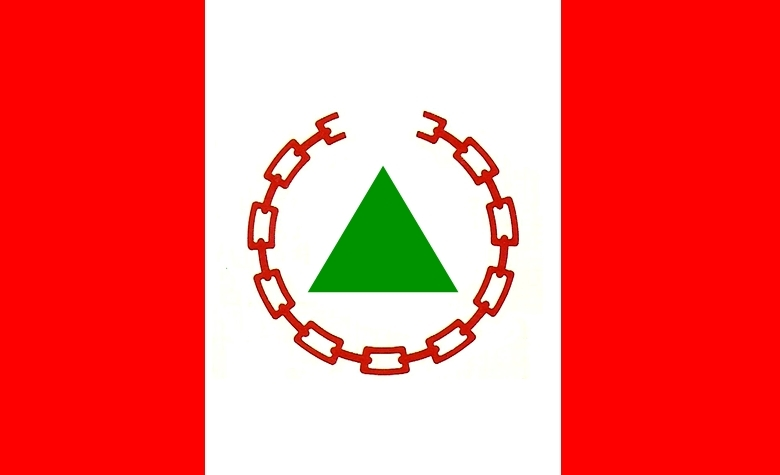
- Flag Coat of arms

- Location in Minas Gerais
- Coordinates: 21°53′31″S 45°35′42″W
- Country: Brazil
- State: Minas Gerais
- Region: Southeast
- Intermediate Region: Varginha
- Immediate Region: Varginha

Area
  - Total: 517.974 km^{2} (199.991 sq mi)
- Elevation: 906 m (2,972 ft)

Population (2020)
  - Total: 25,561
  - Density: 49.348/km^{2} (127.81/sq mi)
- Time zone: UTC−3 (BRT)
- Postal code: 37490-000
- Area code: 35
- HDI (2010): 0.715 – high
- Website: Official website

São Gonçalo do Sapucaí is a municipality in the state of Minas Gerais in the Southeast region of Brazil.

The estimated population is approximately 25,561 inhabitants and the area of the municipality is 517,974 km^{2}. The elevation is 906 m.

== Notable people ==
- Cristiano Luís Rodrigues - footballer
- Hernani - football player
- João Barbosa Rodrigues - botanist

== See also ==
- List of municipalities in Minas Gerais
