= Sport Club Flamengo =

Flamengo
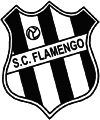
- Full name: Sport Club Flamengo
- Nickname(s): Patativa
- Founded: April 20, 1914
- Dissolved: 1947
Home colours	Away colours	Third colours

Sport Club Flamengo, commonly known as Flamengo, were a Brazilian football team from Recife, Pernambuco state. They won the first edition of the Campeonato Pernambucano.

== History ==
Sport Club Flamengo were founded on April 20, 1914, and they are one of the founders of the Pernambuco State Football Federation, thus they competed in the Campeonato Pernambucano's first edition, played in 1915. They won that competition after beating Torre Sport Club in the final game of the league's final stage. The club participated on the Campeonato Pernmabucano for the last time in 1947, and eventually folded sometime after.

== Honours ==
- Campeonato Pernambucano
  - Winners (1): 1915
