= Aílton (footballer, born October 1984) =

Brazilian footballer

Personal information
- Full name: Aílton do Nascimento Correia
- Date of birth: 13 October 1984 (age 42)
- Place of birth: Recife, Brazil
- Height: 1.78 m (5 ft 10 in)
- Position: Midfielder

Youth career
- –2000: Náutico

Senior career*
Years	Team	Apps	(Gls)
2001–2002	Náutico		
2002–2004	São Paulo	26	(1)
2004	→ Paulista (loan)		
2004	→ Guarani (loan)		
2005	Náutico		
2006	São Bento		
2007–2008	Mogi Mirim		
2008	Botafogo-SP		
2008–2009	Central		
2009–2010	Náutico		
2010	→ Itumbiara (loan)		
2010	Ceará		
2010–2013	São Caetano		
2013–2014	Sport Recife		
2014	→ Santa Cruz (loan)		
2015	Capivariano		
2015	Atlético Goianiense		
2016	Botafogo-PB		
2017	Central		
2017–2018	Vitória-PE		
- * Club domestic league appearances and goals as of 18 October 2023

Aílton do Nascimento Correia (born 13 October 1984) is a Brazilian former professional footballer who played as a midfielder.

== Career ==
Aílton appeared at Náutico as part of the Pernambuco champion team of 2001 and 2002. He was acquired by São Paulo FC but did not establish himself, playing mostly for team B. He returned to Pernambuco football where he obtained the best results of his career, in addition to playing for several other Brazilian football clubs, such as Atlético Goianiense.

Playing for Náutico, he scored the 1000th goal of the 2009 Campeonato Brasileiro Série A.

== Honours ==
Náutico

- Campeonato Pernambucano: 2001, 2002

Sport

- Copa do Nordeste: 2014
- Campeonato Pernambucano: 2014
