= Luciano Henrique =

Brazilian footballer (born 1978)

Personal information
- Full name: Luciano Henrique de Gouveia
- Date of birth: October 10, 1978 (age 48)
- Place of birth: Tremembé, São Paulo, Brazil
- Height: 1.72 m (5 ft 8 in)
- Position: Striker

Team information
- Current team: Santo André

Senior career*
Years	Team	Apps	(Gls)
1998–2000	Taubaté		
2001	Juventus		
2002	Guaratinguetá		
2003–2005	Atlético Sorocaba	17	(2)
2005–2008	Santos	21	(2)
2006	→ Pohang Steelers (loan)	29	(7)
2006–2007	→ Sport Recife (loan)	4	(1)
2007	→ Internacional (loan)	9	(0)
2008	→ Sport Recife (loan)	25	(4)
2009	Sport Recife	9	(4)
2010	São Caetano	12	(1)
2010–2011	Fortaleza	2	(0)
2011	Paysandu	12	(0)
2012	Santa Cruz	14	(2)
2013	Santo André	13	(4)
2014	Taubaté	18	(7)
- * Club domestic league appearances and goals

Luciano Henrique de Gouveia (born October 10, 1978) is a Brazilian former football striker.

He played domestically for Taubaté, Juventus, Guaratinguetá, Atlético Sorocaba, Santos, Sport Recife, Internacional, São Caetano, Fortaleza, Paysandu, Santa Cruz and Santo André, and had a loan spell with South Korean club Pohang Steelers.

== Honours ==
- Campeonato Pernambucano in 2007 and 2008 with Sport Club do Recife
- Copa do Brasil in 2008 with Sport Club do Recife
