= Hugo (footballer, born 1983) =

Brazilian footballer

Personal information
- Full name: Hugo Rodrigues Imbelloni
- Date of birth: August 21, 1983 (age 43)
- Place of birth: Itaperuna, Brazil
- Height: 1.78 m (5 ft 10 in)
- Position: Attacking midfielder

Team information
- Current team: Tupi

Youth career
- 2000–2004: Internacional

Senior career*
Years	Team	Apps	(Gls)
2004	Tupi	?	(?)
2005	Botafogo de Ribeirão Preto	?	(?)
2006	CENE	?	(?)
2006	→ Vitória (loan)	?	(?)
2007	Juventus	?	(?)
2008–2009	Tupi	?	(?)
2009–2011	Atlético Mineiro	?	(?)
2009	→ Sport (loan)	3	(1)
2010	→ Goiás (loan)	5	(1)
2012	Ituano		
2012	Grêmio Barueri	0	(0)
2012–	Tupi	7	(1)
- * Club domestic league appearances and goals as of June 5, 2013 ‡ National team caps and goals as of October 16, 2010

Hugo Rodrigues Imbelloni, the Hugo (Itaperuna, August 21, 1983) is a Brazilian footballer who plays for Tupi as midfielder.

== Career ==
Hugo started his career in the youth of the International. He then spent Tupi by 2004, Botafogo de Ribeirão Preto 2005, CENE 2006, Win 2006 and Juventus in 2007. In 2008, he returned to the team of Juiz de Fora and after a great championship miner, was hired by Atlético Mineiro and subsequently loaned to Sport. In the 2010 season will return to Atlético Mineiro.

In 2010 played in the Goiás on loan from Atlético Mineiro.

=== Career statistics ===
(Correct as of October 16, 2010)

Club	Season	State League		Brazilian Série A		Copa do Brasil		Copa Sudamericana		Total	
Club	Season	Apps	Goals	Apps	Goals	Apps	Goals	Apps	Goals	Apps	Goals
Tupi	2009	10	3	-	-	-	-	-	-	10	3
Atlético Mineiro	2009	-	-	0	0	-	-	-	-	0	0
Sport	2009	-	-	3	1	-	-	-	-	3	1
Atlético Mineiro	2010	0	0	-	-	-	-	-	-	0	0
Goiás	2010	-	-	5	1	-	-	-	-	5	1
Total		10	3	8	2	-	-	-	-	18	5

== Honours ==
Juventus

- Copa Federação Paulista: 2007

== Contract ==
- Goiás.
