= Nêgo Pai =

Brazilian footballer

Personal information
- Full name: Antônio Marcos da Silva
- Date of birth: 5 June 1980 (age 46)
- Place of birth: Campina Grande, Brazil
- Height: 1.75 m (5 ft 9 in)
- Position: Forward

Senior career*
Years	Team	Apps	(Gls)
1998–2003	Perilima		
2004	América-PB		
2007–2008	Perilima		
2009	Araripina		
2009–2010	Sete de Setembro		
2010	Auto Esporte		
2011	Petrolina		
2011	Belo Jardim		
2012	Lagarto		
2012	Vitória-PE		
2013	Cruzeiro-PB		
2013	Jaguar-PE		
2014–2015	Maranguape		
2016	Serrano-PB		
2016–2017	Picuiense		
2017	Atlético Potiguar		
2018	Kaburé		

Managerial career
- 2014: Perilima
- * Club domestic league appearances and goals as of 23 October 2023

Antônio Marcos da Silva (born 5 June 1980), better known as Nêgo Pai, is a Brazilian former professional footballer who played as a forward.

== Career ==
Nêgo Pai came to football when he participated in the squad led by Pedro Ribeiro Lima, at Perilima, a team founded by the biscuit factory of the same name that competed in football in Paraíba. Due to his prominence above other employees, he ended up becoming a professional footballer and playing for smaller football teams in the northeast region. He was also coach of Perilima in 2014.

== Honours ==
Individual

- 2014 Campeonato Cearense Série B top scorer: 11 goals
