= Cordislândia =

Coordinates: 21.7928°S 45.7008°W

- Municipality
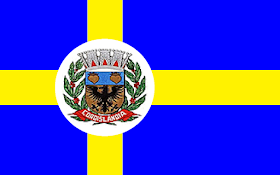
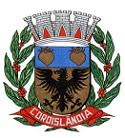
- Flag Coat of arms
- Interactive map of Cordislândia
- Country: Brazil
- Region: Southeast
- State: Minas Gerais
- Mesoregion: Sul/Sudoeste de Minas

Population (2020)
  - Total: 3,542
- Time zone: UTC−3 (BRT)

Cordislândia is a municipality in the state of Minas Gerais in the Southeast region of Brazil.

== See also ==
- List of municipalities in Minas Gerais
