= Bimbinha =

Brazilian footballer (1956 – 2020)

Personal information
- Full name: Reginaldo Castro
- Date of birth: 10 June 1956
- Place of birth: São Luís, Brazil
- Date of death: 15 May 2020 (aged 63)
- Place of death: São Luís, Brazil
- Height: 1.47 m (4 ft 10 in)
- Position: Winger

Senior career*
Years	Team	Apps	(Gls)
1975–1982	Sampaio Corrêa		
1982–1983	Izabelense		
1983–1984	Moto Club		
1984–1988	Sampaio Corrêa		
1989	Moto Club		
1990–1991	Expressinho		
- * Club domestic league appearances and goals as of 2 November 2023

Reginaldo Castro (10 June 1956 – 15 May 2020), better known as Bimbinha, was a Brazilian professional footballer who played as a winger.

== Career ==
A successful player in Maranhão football with 11 state titles (9 for Sampaio Corrêa and 2 for Moto Club), Bimbinha is considered the shortest professional footballer in the history of Brazilian football, with 1.47 m.

== Honours ==
Sampaio Corrêa

- Campeonato Maranhense: 1975, 1976, 1978, 1980, 1984, 1985, 1986, 1987, 1988

Moto Club

- Campeonato Maranhense: 1983, 1989

== Death ==
Bimbinha died on 15 May 2020, due to kidney problems. He was buried in the Turu Cemetery, São Luís.
