= Asprilla (footballer, born 1981) =

Brazilian footballer

Personal information
- Full name: Cristiano Luís Rodrigues
- Date of birth: 4 May 1981 (age 45)
- Place of birth: São Gonçalo do Sapucaí, Brazil
- Height: 1.81 m (5 ft 11 in)
- Position: Centre-back

Youth career
- 1999–2000: Paulista

Senior career*
Years	Team	Apps	(Gls)
2001–2004	Paulista	21	(0)
2004	→ Goiás (loan)	10	(2)
2004–2005	Ankaraspor	1	(0)
2005–2007	Botafogo	36	(1)
2007	→ Figuieirense (oan)	14	(0)
2008	Figuieirense	33	(1)
2009	Náutico	26	(1)
- * Club domestic league appearances and goals

Cristiano Luís Rodrigues or simply Asprilla (born 4 May 1981) is a Brazilian former professional footballer who played as a centre-back.
