= Associação Desportiva Perilima =

Brazilian football club

Perilima
- Full name: Associação Desportiva Perilima
- Nicknames: Time da Sorda; Águia da Campina
- Founded: September 8, 1992
- Ground: Estádio Governador Ernani Sátiro, Campina Grande, Brazil
- Capacity: 38,000
- Chairman: Pedro Ribeiro Lima
- Manager: Dinho Silva
- League: Campeonato Paraibano
- 2021: Paraibano, 8th (relegated)
Home colours	Away colours

Associação Desportiva Perilima is a football club from Campina Grande, Paraíba, Brazil. The club was founded on September 8, 1992. The club owner is Pedro Ribeiro Lima nicknamed 'Seu Pedro'; he is also its president. Lima, born in 1948, is also the oldest professional football player in the world, and the oldest player to score a goal in professional football worldwide in 2007 against Campinense from the penalty spot.

== History ==
Perilima's old badge

In September 1992, Pedro Ribeiro Lima founded a club named after his initials PEdro RIbeiro LIMA (Perilima). The club was founded as a factory team in a sorda candy factory owned by him.

Six years after, in 1998, the club entered its first professional championship. At the time, the team was formed by the factory workers. 'Seu Pedro' was both coach and player, they finished as runners-up and were promoted to Paraíba State Championship First Division, in which they currently play.

During a stage of financial hardship, the club was helped by members of the Orkut social network, who crowdfunded a campaign to alleviate its finances. This campaign effectively acted as a sponsorship deal, and the community's identification number was added to the uniform's shirt sleeves.

== Notable players ==
- Pedro Ribeiro Lima
- Nêgo Pai

== Achievements ==
- Campeonato Paraibano Second Division:
  - Runners-up (6): 1998, 2000, 2001, 2004, 2006, 2018
