= Vandinho (footballer, born August 1986) =

Brazilian footballer

Personal information
- Full name: Vanderson da Silva Souza
- Date of birth: August 24, 1986 (age 40)
- Place of birth: Londrina, Paraná, Brazil
- Height: 1.78 m (5 ft 10 in)
- Position: Striker

Team information
- Current team: Rio Branco

Youth career
- 2000–2001: PSTC-PR

Senior career*
Years	Team	Apps	(Gls)
2002	Juventus-SP	0	(0)
2003–2004	Paraná	5	(1)
2005	→ São Paulo (Loan)	0	(0)
2006–2007	Paraná	3	(0)
2007	→ Guaratinguetá (loan)	16	(9)
2007–2008	Avaí	34	(27)
2008–2011	Desportivo Brasil	0	(0)
2008	→ Flamengo (loan)	10	(2)
2009	→ Sport Recife (loan)	22	(7)
2010	→ Avaí (loan)	20	(3)
2011	→ São Caetano (loan)	10	(5)
2011	Alania Vladikavkaz	10	(1)
2011	Al-Arabi	2	(0)
2012	Portuguesa	4	(0)
2012–2013	São Caetano	19	(3)
2013	América-RN	11	(3)
2014	Santo André	8	(0)
2014	Skövde AIK	10	(7)
2016	J. Malucelli	0	(0)
2016–2017	Vila Nova	22	(7)
2017	Ypiranga	8	(2)
2018–	Rio Branco	0	(0)
- * Club domestic league appearances and goals as of 7 February 2018

Vanderson da Silva Souza (born August 24, 1986, in Londrina), or simply Vandinho, is a Brazilian striker who plays for Rio Branco.

== Career ==
=== Flamengo ===
After a great first half of 2008, scoring many goals for Avaí and being one of the top Brazilian goalscorers in all divisional levels, Flamengo signed Vandinho hoping he could solve the problem of lack of goals after the club's loss of many players due to transfers and injuries.

In his debut for the new club, he came from the bench in the beginning of the second half of a match against Cruzeiro in Maracanã Stadium on August 3, 2008, and after only 12 minutes he scored his first goal for Flamengo. Although, Flamengo eventually lost the match 1-2.

=== Flamengo career statistics ===
(Correct as of February 13, 2009)

Club	Season	Carioca League			Brazilian Série A			Brazilian Cup			Copa Libertadores			Total		
Club	Season	Apps	Goals	Assists	Apps	Goals	Assists	Apps	Goals	Assists	Apps	Goals	Assists	Apps	Goals	Assists
Flamengo	2008	-	-	-	10	2	1	-	-	-	-	-	-	10	2	1

according to combined sources on the.

=== Sport Recife ===
On February 13, 2009, Vandinho signed his transfer from Flamengo to Sport Recife to play in the Copa Libertadores 2009.

== Honours ==
- Paraná State League: 2006
- Campeonato Catarinense: 2010
