= Andrade (footballer, born 1981) =

Brazilian footballer

Personal information
- Full name: João Henrique de Andrade Amaral
- Date of birth: 13 October 1981 (age 45)
- Place of birth: São Paulo, Brazil
- Height: 1.74 m (5 ft 9 in)
- Position: Midfielder

Team information
- Current team: Audax Rio

Senior career*
Years	Team	Apps	(Gls)
1998–1999	Mirassol		
2000–2002	Santos		
2003	América (Mexico)	13	(1)
2003–2005	Santa Cruz	30	(6)
2006	Vasco da Gama	14	(2)
2006–2007	Sporting Braga	11	(1)
2007–2008	Vasco da Gama	0	(0)
2008	Cádiz		
2008–2009	Sport Recife		
2010	Coritiba		
2012	Linense		
2012	Brasiliense		
2013–2015	Audax Rio		
2014–2015	Red Bull Brasil		
- * Club domestic league appearances and goals

João Henrique de Andrade Amaral (born 13 October 1981, in São Paulo) is a Brazilian footballer, who plays as a midfielder, and is currently a free agent.

== Football career ==
Andrade born in São Paulo, one of the two cities famous of football and its products (another is Rio de Janeiro). After his contract with Vasco da Gama finished, he joined Sporting Braga in January 2007, signed a contract last until 30 June 2010.

He was returned to Vasco da Gama in July 2007, signed a two-year deal.

While under contract with Vasco da Gama, Andrade agreed a pre-contract deal with Cádiz to join them in July 2008 on a 2-year deal with a further 1-year extension option. In 2009 he signed with Sport Recife.

In November 2009 Sport Recife released midfielder by mutual agreement, making him a free agent now. On 9 February 2010 Coritiba Foot Ball Club signed former Sport Recife midfielder on a free transfer.
