= Torre Sport Club =

Brazilian football club

Torre
- Full name: Torre Sport Club
- Nickname(s): Madeira Rubra
- Founded: May 13, 1909
- Dissolved: 1943; 82 years ago
- Ground: Estádio Avenida Malaquias, Recife, Pernambuco state, Brazil
- Capacity: 2,000
Home colors	Away colors

Torre Sport Club, commonly known as Torre, was a Brazilian football club based in Recife, Pernambuco state. They won the Campeonato Pernambucano three times

== History ==
The club was founded in 1909. They won the Campeonato Pernambucano in 1926, 1929, and in 1930. The club competed in the Campeonato Pernambucano for the last time in 1940. Torre eventually folded.

== Honours ==
- Campeonato Pernambucano
  - Winners (3): 1926, 1929, 1930
  - Runners-up (3): 1925, 1927, 1928
- Torneio Início de Pernambuco
  - Winners (2): 1922, 1929

== Stadium ==
Torre Sport Club played their home games at Estádio Avenida Malaquias. The stadium had a maximum capacity of 2,000 people.
