= Gilmar (footballer, born 1984) =

Brazilian footballer

Personal information
- Full name: Gilmar Silva Santos
- Date of birth: March 9, 1984 (age 42)
- Place of birth: Ubatã, Brazil
- Height: 1.77 m (5 ft 9 1/2 in)
- Position: Attacking midfielder

Team information
- Current team: Náutico

Youth career
- 2000–2002: Vitória

Senior career*
Years	Team	Apps	(Gls)
2003–2005	Vitória		
2006	→ Santos (loan)		
2006	Tokyo Verdy		
2007	Yokohama FC		
2007	Tokyo Verdy		
2008–2009	Náutico		
2009–2011	Guingamp		
2010	→ Prudente (loan)		
2012	Avaí		
2012	Criciúma		
2013	Oeste		
2013–2015	ABC		
2015	América de Natal		
2016	Santo André		
2017	Itumbiara		
2017–	Náutico		
- * Club domestic league appearances and goals as of 21 May 2013

Gilmar Silva Santos or simply Gilmar (born March 9, 1984, in Ubatã), is a Brazilian attacking midfielder who currently plays for Itumbiara.

He signed for French team EA Guingamp after a very good 2008/09 season with Náutico. In 2010, Guingamp loaned him to Prudente to play the Brazilian first league.

== Club statistics ==
Club performance			League		Cup		League Cup		Total	
Season	Club	League	Apps	Goals	Apps	Goals	Apps	Goals	Apps	Goals
Japan			League		Emperor's Cup		J.League Cup		Total	
2006	Tokyo Verdy	J2 League	18	9	1	0	-		19	9
2007	Yokohama FC	J1 League	5	0	0	0	3	1	8	1
2007	Tokyo Verdy	J2 League	12	1	0	0	-		12	1
Country	Japan		35	10	1	0	3	1	39	11
Total			35	10	1	0	3	1	39	11

== Honours ==
América de Natal

- Campeonato Potiguar: 2015

Santo André

- Campeonato Paulista Série A2: 2016
