= 2009 in Brazilian football =

Football in Brazil
- Season: 2009

The following article presents a summary of the 2009 football (soccer) season in Brazil, which was the 108th season of competitive football in the country.

== Campeonato Brasileiro Série A ==
The Campeonato Brasileiro Série A 2009 started on May 9, 2009, and concluded on December 6, 2009.

Pos	Team	Pld	W	D	L	GF	GA	GD	Pts	Qualification or relegation
1	Flamengo (C)	38	19	10	9	58	44	+14	67	2010 Copa Libertadores Second Stage
2	Internacional	38	19	8	11	65	44	+21	65	2010 Copa Libertadores Second Stage
3	São Paulo	38	18	11	9	57	42	+15	65	2010 Copa Libertadores Second Stage
4	Cruzeiro	38	18	8	12	58	53	+5	62	2010 Copa Libertadores First Stage
5	Palmeiras	38	17	11	10	58	45	+13	62	2010 Copa Sudamericana Second Stage
6	Avaí	38	15	12	11	61	52	+9	57	2010 Copa Sudamericana Second Stage
7	Atlético Mineiro	38	16	8	14	55	56	−1	56	2010 Copa Sudamericana Second Stage
8	Grêmio	38	15	10	13	67	46	+21	55	2010 Copa Sudamericana Second Stage
9	Goiás	38	15	10	13	64	65	−1	55	2010 Copa Sudamericana Second Stage
10	Corinthians	38	14	10	14	50	54	−4	52	2010 Copa Libertadores Second Stage (Note: Corinthians qualified as the 2009 Copa do Brasil champion.)
11	Barueri	38	12	13	13	59	52	+7	49	2010 Copa Sudamericana Second Stage
12	Santos	38	12	13	13	58	58	0	49	2010 Copa Sudamericana Second Stage
13	Vitória	38	13	9	16	51	57	−6	48	2010 Copa Sudamericana Second Stage
14	Atlético Paranaense	38	13	9	16	42	49	−7	48	
15	Botafogo	38	11	14	13	52	58	−6	47	
16	Fluminense	38	11	13	14	49	56	−7	46	
17	Coritiba (R)	38	12	9	17	48	60	−12	45	Relegation to Série B
18	Santo André (R)	38	11	8	19	46	61	−15	41	Relegation to Série B
19	Náutico (R)	38	10	8	20	48	71	−23	38	Relegation to Série B
20	Sport Recife (R)	38	7	10	21	48	71	−23	31	Relegation to Série B

Updated to match(es) played on November 29, 2009. Source: CBF (in Portuguese)
Rules for classification: 1st points; 2nd wins; 3rd goal difference; 4th goals scored; 5th head-to-head results; 6th least red cards received; 7th least yellow cards received; 8th draw
(C) Champions; (R) Relegated
Notes:

Flamengo declared as the Campeonato Brasileiro Série A champions.

=== Relegation ===
The four worst placed teams, which are Coritiba, Santo André, Náutico and Sport, were relegated to the following year's second level.

== Campeonato Brasileiro Série B ==
The Campeonato Brasileiro Série B 2009 started on May 8, 2009, and concluded on November 28, 2009.

Pos	Team	Pld	W	D	L	GF	GA	GD	Pts	Promotion or relegation
1	Vasco da Gama (C, P)	38	22	10	6	58	29	+29	76	Promotion to Campeonato Brasileiro
2	Guarani (P)	38	21	6	11	55	51	+4	69	Promotion to Campeonato Brasileiro
3	Ceará (P)	38	19	11	8	54	34	+20	68	Promotion to Campeonato Brasileiro
4	Atlético Goianiense (P)	38	20	5	13	73	53	+20	65	Promotion to Campeonato Brasileiro
5	Portuguesa	38	18	8	12	53	45	+8	62	
6	Figueirense	38	19	3	16	64	51	+13	60	
7	São Caetano	38	15	9	14	52	38	+14	54	
8	Duque de Caxias	38	15	9	14	55	55	0	54	
9	Bragantino	38	15	8	15	52	51	+1	53	
10	Paraná	38	14	11	13	51	56	−5	53	
11	Ponte Preta	38	14	10	14	62	55	+7	52	
12	Bahia	38	14	9	15	52	53	−1	51	
13	Vila Nova	38	14	7	17	42	59	−17	49	
14	Brasiliense	38	14	6	18	45	56	−11	48	
15	Ipatinga	38	12	12	14	43	50	−7	48	
16	América-RN	38	13	7	18	49	61	−12	46	
17	Juventude (R)	38	12	8	18	46	50	−4	44	Relegation to Série C
18	Fortaleza (R)	38	10	8	20	56	64	−8	38	Relegation to Série C
19	Campinense (R)	38	11	4	23	54	79	−25	37	Relegation to Série C
20	ABC (R)	38	10	5	23	40	66	−26	35	Relegation to Série C

Source: CBF
Rules for classification: 1st points; 2nd wins; 3rd goal difference; 4th goals scored; 5th head-to-head results; 6th least red cards received; 7th least yellow cards received; 8th draw
(C) Champions; (P) Promoted; (R) Relegated

Vasco da Gama declared as the Campeonato Brasileiro Série B champions.

=== Promotion ===
The four best placed teams, which are Vasco da Gama, Guarani, Ceará and Atlético Goianiense, were promoted to the following year's first level.

=== Relegation ===
The four worst placed teams, which are Juventude, Fortaleza, Campinense and ABC, were relegated to the following year's third level.

== Campeonato Brasileiro Série C ==
The Campeonato Brasileiro Série C 2009 started on May 24, 2009, and concluded on September 19, 2009. The Campeonato Brasileiro Série C final was played between América-MG and ASA.

September 13, 2009

ASA	1–3	América-MG

Municipal Coaracy da Mata Fonseca

September 19, 2009

América-MG	1–0	ASA

Independência

América-MG declared as the league champions by aggregate score of 4–1.

=== Promotion ===
The four best placed teams, which are América-MG, ASA, Guaratinguetá and Icasa, were promoted to the following year's second level.

=== Relegation ===
The four worst placed teams, which are Sampaio Corrêa, Confiança, Mixto and Marcílio Dias, were relegated to the following year's fourth level.

== Campeonato Brasileiro Série D ==
The Campeonato Brasileiro Série D 2009 started on July 5, 2009, and concluded on November 1, 2009. The Campeonato Brasileiro Série D final was played between São Raimundo and Macaé.

October 25, 2009

Macaé	3–2	São Raimundo

Raulino de Oliveira

November 1, 2009

São Raimundo	2–1	Macaé

Barbalhão

São Raimundo declared as the league champions by aggregate score of 4–4.

=== Promotion ===
The four best placed teams, which are São Raimundo, Macaé, Alecrim and Chapecoense, were promoted to the following year's third level.

== Copa do Brasil ==
The Copa do Brasil 2009 started on February 18, 2009, and ended on July 1, 2009. The Copa do Brasil final was played between Corinthians and Internacional.

June 17, 2009

Corinthians	2–0	Internacional

Pacaembu

July 1, 2009

Internacional	2–2	Corinthians

Beira-Rio

Corinthians declared as the cup champions by aggregate score of 4–2.

== State championship champions ==
State	Champion
(Acre (state)) Acre	Juventus
Alagoas	ASA
Amapá	São José-AP
(Amazonas (Brazilian state)) Amazonas	América-AM
Bahia	Vitória
Ceará	Fortaleza
(Federal District (Brazil)) Distrito Federal	Brasiliense
Espírito Santo	São Mateus
Goiás	Goiás
Maranhão	JV Lideral
Mato Grosso	Luverdense
Mato Grosso do Sul	Naviraiense
Minas Gerais	Cruzeiro
Pará	Paysandu
Paraíba	Sousa
(Paraná (state)) Paraná	Atlético-PR
Pernambuco	Sport
Piauí	Flamengo-PI
(Rio de Janeiro (state)) Rio de Janeiro	Flamengo-RJ
Rio Grande do Norte	ASSU
Rio Grande do Sul	Internacional
Rondônia	Vilhena
Roraima	Atlético Roraima
(Santa Catarina (state)) Santa Catarina	Avaí
(São Paulo (state)) São Paulo	Corinthians
Sergipe	Confiança
Tocantins	Araguaína

== Youth competition champions ==
Competition	Champion
Campeonato Brasileiro Sub-20	Grêmio
Copa Brasil Sub-17 (Copa Nacional do Espírito Santo Sub-17)^{(1)}	Internacional
Copa Macaé de Juvenis	United States U-17
Copa Santiago de Futebol Juvenil	Internacional
Copa São Paulo de Juniores	Corinthians
Copa Sub-17 de Promissão	Fluminense
Taça Belo Horizonte de Juniores	Atlético Mineiro
Copa 2 de Julho Sub-17	Brazil U-17

^{(1)} The Copa Nacional do Espírito Santo Sub-17, between 2008 and 2012, was named Copa Brasil Sub-17. The similar named Copa do Brasil Sub-17 is organized by the Brazilian Football Confederation and it was first played in 2013.

== Other competition champions ==
Competition	Champion
Campeonato Paulista do Interior	Ponte Preta
Copa Espírito Santo	Vitória
Copa FGF	Internacional
Copa Governador do Mato Grosso	Vila Aurora
Copa Integração	Icasa
Copa Paulista de Futebol	Votoraty
Copa Pernambuco	Santa Cruz
Copa Rio	Tigres do Brasil
Copa Santa Catarina	Joinville
Recopa Sul-Brasileira	Joinville
Taça Minas Gerais	Uberaba

== Brazilian clubs in international competitions ==
Team	Copa Libertadores 2009	Copa Sudamericana 2009	Recopa Sudamericana 2009	Suruga Bank Championship 2009
Atlético Mineiro	did not qualify	First Stage eliminated by (Brazil) Goiás	did not qualify	did not qualify
Atlético Paranaense	did not qualify	First Stage eliminated by (Brazil) Botafogo	did not qualify	did not qualify
Botafogo	did not qualify	Quarterfinals eliminated by (Paraguay) Cerro Porteño	did not qualify	did not qualify
Coritiba	did not qualify	First Stage eliminated by (Brazil) Vitória	did not qualify	did not qualify
Cruzeiro	Runner-up lost to (Argentina) Estudiantes	did not qualify	did not qualify	did not qualify
Flamengo	did not qualify	First Stage eliminated by (Brazil) Fluminense	did not qualify	did not qualify
Fluminense	did not qualify	Runner-up lost to (Ecuador) LDU Quito	did not qualify	did not qualify
Goiás	did not qualify	Round of 16 eliminated by (Paraguay) Cerro Porteño	did not qualify	did not qualify
Grêmio	Semifinals eliminated by (Brazil) Cruzeiro	did not qualify	did not qualify	did not qualify
Internacional	did not qualify	Round of 16 eliminated by Universidad de Chile	Runner-up lost to (Ecuador) LDU Quito	Champions defeated (Japan) Oita Trinita
Palmeiras	Quarterfinals eliminated by (Uruguay) Nacional	did not qualify	did not qualify	did not qualify
São Paulo	Quarterfinals eliminated by (Brazil) Cruzeiro	did not qualify	did not qualify	did not qualify
Sport	Round of 16 eliminated by (Brazil) Palmeiras	did not qualify	did not qualify	did not qualify
Vitória	did not qualify	Round of 16 eliminated by (Uruguay) River Plate	did not qualify	did not qualify

== Brazil national team ==
The following table lists all the games played by the Brazil national football team in official competitions and friendly matches during 2009.

Date	City	Opposition	Result	Score	Brazil scorers	Competition
February 10, 2009	(England) London	Italy	W	2–0	Elano, Robinho	International Friendly
March 29, 2009	(Ecuador) Quito	Ecuador	D	1–1	Baptista	World Cup Qualifying
April 1, 2009	(Brazil) Porto Alegre	Peru	W	3–0	Luís Fabiano (2), Melo	World Cup Qualifying
June 6, 2009	(Uruguay) Montevideo	Uruguay	W	4–0	Alves, Juan, Luís Fabiano, Kaká	World Cup Qualifying
June 10, 2009	(Brazil) Recife	Paraguay	W	2–1	Robinho, Nilmar	World Cup Qualifying
June 15, 2009	(South Africa) Bloemfontein	Egypt	W	4–3	Kaká (2), Luís Fabiano, Juan	Confederations Cup
June 18, 2009	(South Africa) Pretoria	United States	W	3–0	Melo, Robinho, Maicon	Confederations Cup
June 21, 2009	(South Africa) Pretoria	Italy	W	3–0	Luís Fabiano (2), Dossena (o.g.)	Confederations Cup
June 25, 2009	(South Africa) Johannesburg	South Africa	W	1–0	Alves	Confederations Cup
June 28, 2009	(South Africa) Johannesburg	United States	W	3–2	Luís Fabiano (2), Lúcio	Confederations Cup
August 12, 2009	(Estonia) Tallinn	Estonia	W	1–0	Luís Fabiano	International Friendly
September 5, 2009	(Argentina) Rosario	Argentina	W	3–1	Luisão, Luís Fabiano (2)	World Cup Qualifying
September 9, 2009	(Brazil) Salvador	Chile	W	4–2	Nilmar (3), Baptista	World Cup Qualifying
October 10, 2009	(Bolivia) La Paz	Bolivia	L	1–2	Nilmar	World Cup Qualifying
October 14, 2009	(Brazil) Campo Grande	Venezuela	D	0–0	-	World Cup Qualifying
November 14, 2009	(Qatar) Doha	England	W	1–0	Nilmar	International Friendly
November 17, 2009	(Oman) Muscat	Oman	W	2–0	Nilmar, Al-Gheilani (o.g.)	International Friendly

TBD = to be decided

== Women's football ==
=== Brazil women's national football team ===
The following table lists all the games played by the Brazil women's national football team in official competitions and friendly matches during 2009.

Date	Opposition	Result	Score	Brazil scorers	Competition
April 22, 2009	Germany	D	1–1	Maurine	International Friendly
April 25, 2009	Sweden	L	1–3	Cristiane	International Friendly
July 11, 2009	Juiz de Fora Combined Team	W	7–0	Daniele (3), Daiane Moretti, Leah, Mônica, Pâmela Faria	International Friendly (unofficial match)
November 2, 2009	Apucarana Combined Team	W	15–0	unavailable	International Friendly (unofficial match)
November 5, 2009	Paranavaí Combined Team	W	21–1	unavailable	International Friendly (unofficial match)
November 8, 2009	Maringá Combined Team	W	11–0	Cristiane (5), Grazielle (2), unavailable (4)	International Friendly (unofficial match)
December 9, 2009	Chile	W	3–1	Cristiane (2), Marta	Torneio Internacional Feminino
December 13, 2009	Mexico	W	3–2	Marta, Érika, Cristiane	Torneio Internacional Feminino
December 16, 2009	China	W	3–0	Marta (2), Grazielle	Torneio Internacional Feminino
December 20, 2009	Mexico	W	5–2	Alina (own goal), Marta (3), Érika	Torneio Internacional Feminino

TBD = to be decided

The Brazil women's national football team competed in the following competitions in 2009:

Competition	Performance
Torneio Internacional Cidade de São Paulo de Futebol Feminino	Champions

=== Copa do Brasil de Futebol Feminino ===
The Copa do Brasil de Futebol Feminino 2009 started on September 24, 2009, and concluded on December 1, 2009.

December 1, 2009

Santos	3–0	Botucatu

Pacaembu

Santos declared as the cup champions after beating Botucatu 3–0.

=== Other domestic competition champions ===
Competition	Champion
Campeonato Carioca	Volta Redonda
Campeonato Paulista	Santos (by LINAF); Botucatu (by FPF)

=== Brazilian clubs in international competitions ===
Team	2009 Copa Libertadores Femenina
Santos	Champions defeated (Paraguay) Universidad Autónoma
