= 2009 Campeonato Pernambucano =

95th edition of the Campeonato Pernambucano

The Campeonato Pernambucano 2009 was the 95th edition of the Campeonato Pernambucano. The competition was won by Sport.

== Format ==
Série A1 (A1 Series)

The Campeonato Pernambucano is divided into two rounds: Taça Revolução Constitucionalista de 1817 (1817 Constitutionalist Revolution Cup) and Taça Confederação do Equador (Confederation of the Equator Cup).

In each round, the teams played once against each of the remaining teams. The champion of the round was the team that made the most points at the end of the eleven rounds. The final was played between the champions of the shifts.

The Campeonato Pernambucano will be decided in two extra matches between the winner of the two Cups. If a club win the two cups it is declared as the Campeonato Pernambucano 2009 champions.

== Participating clubs ==
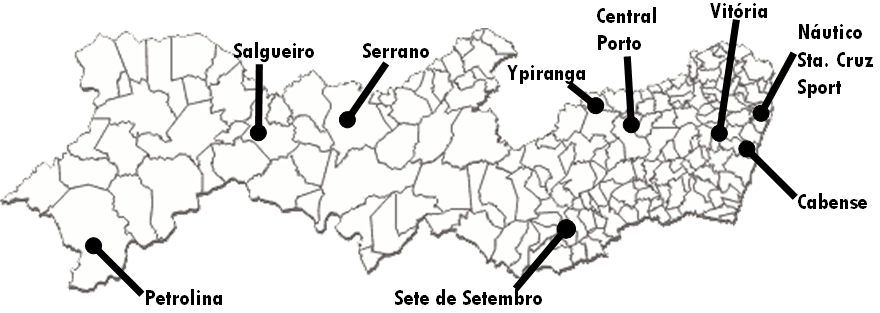
Campeonato Pernambucano 2009 map.

Club	City	Stadium
Cabense	Cabo	Gileno de Carli
Central	Caruaru	Lacerdão
Náutico	Recife	Aflitos
Petrolina	Petrolina	Paulo de Souza Coelho
Porto	Caruaru	Antônio Inácio
Salgueiro	Salgueiro	Cornélio de Barros
Santa Cruz	Recife	Arruda
Serrano	Serra Talhada	Pereirão
Sete de Setembro	Garanhuns	Gigante do Agreste
Sport	Recife	Ilha do Retiro
Vitória	Vitória	Carneirão
Ypiranga	Santa Cruz do Capibaribe	Limeirão

== Taça Revolução Constitucionalista de 1817 ==
Taça Revolução Constitucionalista de 1817
P	Team	Pts	G	W	D	L	GF	GA	GD
1	Sport	31	11	10	1	0	26	4	22
2	Santa Cruz	24	11	7	3	1	23	14	9
3	Naútico	22	11	6	4	1	21	14	7
4	Porto	16	11	5	1	5	17	9	8
5	Cabense	16	11	5	1	5	12	10	2
6	Salgueiro	16	11	4	4	3	13	12	1
7	Central	14	11	4	2	5	16	14	2
8	Sete de Setembro	13	11	3	4	4	11	11	0
9	Ypiranga	12	11	4	0	7	17	27	-10
10	Serrano	9	11	2	3	6	9	24	-15
11	Petrolina	6	11	2	0	9	14	25	-11
12	Vitória	6	11	1	3	7	7	22	-15
P - position; Pts – points earned; G – games played; W - matches won; D - matches drawn; L - matches lost;GF – goals for; GA – goals against; GD – goal difference

Taça Revolução Constitucionalista de 1817 champion and qualified to the final

== Taça Confederação do Equador ==
Taça Confederação do Equador
P	Team	Pts	G	W	D	L	GF	GA	GD
1	Sport	29	11	9	2	0	27	8	19
2	Naútico	26	11	8	2	1	23	9	14
3	Santa Cruz	19	11	6	1	4	17	12	5
4	Salgueiro	17	11	5	2	4	20	16	4
5	Porto	16	11	5	1	5	14	12	2
6	Vitória	15	11	4	3	4	16	21	-5
7	Central	14	11	4	2	5	14	17	-3
8	Ypiranga	12	11	2	6	3	18	12	6
9	Serrano	11	11	3	2	6	8	21	-13
10	Sete de Setembro	8	11	1	5	5	12	15	-3
11	Cabense	7	11	0	7	4	10	23	-13
12	Petrolina	6	11	1	3	7	8	21	-13

Taça Confederação do Equador champion and qualified to the final

== General Qualification ==
General Qualification
P	Team	Pts	G	W	D	L	GF	GA	GD
1	Sport	60	22	19	3	0	53	12	41
2	Naútico	48	22	14	6	2	44	23	21
3	Santa Cruz	43	22	13	4	5	40	26	14
4	Salgueiro	33	22	9	6	7	33	28	5
5	Porto	32	22	10	2	10	31	21	10
6	Central	28	22	7	5	10	30	31	-1
7	Ypiranga	24	22	6	6	10	35	39	-4
8	Cabense	23	22	5	8	9	22	23	-11
9	Vitória	21	22	5	6	11	23	44	-21
10	Sete de Setembro	21	22	4	9	9	23	26	-3
11	Serrano	20	22	5	5	12	17	45	-28
12	Petrolina	12	22	3	3	16	23	46	-23

2009 Campeonato Pernambucano champion
Relegated to the 2010 Campeonato Pernambucano Série A2

Campeonato Pernambucano
2009 Winners
Sport
38th Title
