= Campeonato Pernambucano =

Football championship in Pernambuco, Brazil

- Organising body: FPF
- Founded: 1915; 111 years ago (as different amateur leagues); 1937; 89 years ago (as the profissional Campeonato Pernambucano)
- Country: Brazil
- State: Pernambuco
- Level on pyramid: 1
- Relegation to: Pernambucano Série A2
- Domestic cup(s): Copa do Brasil; Copa do Nordeste
- Current champions: Sport (46th title) (2026)
- Most championships: Sport (46 titles)
- Broadcaster(s): TV Globo; DAZN
- Website: FPF Official website
- Current: 2026 Campeonato Pernambucano

The Campeonato Pernambucano is the top-flight professional state football league in the Brazilian state of Pernambuco. It is run by the Pernambuco Football Federation (FPF).

== History ==
The first edition of the Campeonato Pernambucano was played in 1915, and was won by Flamengo de Recife, a defunct club.

In 1936, Tramways became undefeated state champions with a team made up of players who were paid a salary. This led to significant changes in the structure of football in Pernambuco, heralding the definitive transition from amateurism to professionalism. The following season, Central's defender Zago became the first player to be registered as a professional by the Pernambuco Sports Federation, marking the official start of professionalism in the state.

== List of champions ==
=== Amateur era ===
Season	Champions	Runners-up
1915	Flamengo de Recife (1)	Santa Cruz
1916	Sport (1)	Santa Cruz
1917	Sport (2)	Santa Cruz
1918	América (1)	Santa Cruz
1919	América (2)	Sport
1920	Sport (3)	Santa Cruz
1921	América (3)	Santa Cruz
1922	América (4)	Sport
1923	Sport (4)	América
1924	Sport (5)	América
1925	Sport (6)	Torre
1926	Torre (1)	Náutico
1927	América (5)	Torre
1928	Sport (7)	Torre
1929	Torre (2)	Santa Cruz
1930	Torre (3)	América
1931	Santa Cruz (1)	Náutico
1932	Santa Cruz (2)	Íris
1933	Santa Cruz (3)	Varzeano
1934	Náutico (1)	Santa Cruz
1935	Santa Cruz (4)	Tramways
1936	Tramways (1)	Santa Cruz

=== Professional era ===
Season	Champions	Runners-up
1937	Tramways (2)	Santa Cruz
1938	Sport (8)	Santa Cruz
1939	Náutico (2)	Santa Cruz
1940	Santa Cruz (5)	Sport
1941	Sport (9)	América
1942	Sport (10)	Náutico
1943	Sport (11)	Santa Cruz
1944	América (6)	Náutico
1945	Náutico (3)	América
1946	Santa Cruz (6)	Náutico
1947	Santa Cruz (7)	América
1948	Sport (12)	América
1949	Sport (13)	Santa Cruz
1950	Náutico (4)	América
1951	Náutico (5)	Sport
1952	Náutico (6)	América
1953	Sport (14)	Santa Cruz
1954	Náutico (7)	Sport
1955	Sport (15)	Náutico
1956	Sport (16)	Náutico
1957	Santa Cruz (8)	Sport
1958	Sport (17)	Náutico
1959	Santa Cruz (9)	Náutico
1960	Náutico (8)	Santa Cruz
1961	Sport (18)	Náutico
1962	Sport (19)	Santa Cruz
1963	Náutico (9)	Sport
1964	Náutico (10)	Sport
1965	Náutico (11)	Sport
1966	Náutico (12)	Sport
1967	Náutico (13)	Sport
1968	Náutico (14)	Sport
1969	Santa Cruz (10)	Sport
1970	Santa Cruz (11)	Náutico
1971	Santa Cruz (12)	Sport
1972	Santa Cruz (13)	Sport
1973	Santa Cruz (14)	Sport
1974	Náutico (15)	Santa Cruz
1975	Sport (20)	Náutico
1976	Santa Cruz (15)	Náutico
1977	Sport (21)	Náutico
1978	Santa Cruz (16)	Náutico
1979	Santa Cruz (17)	Náutico
1980	Sport (22)	Santa Cruz
1981	Sport (23)	Náutico
1982	Sport (24)	Náutico
1983	Santa Cruz (18)	Náutico
1984	Náutico (16)	Santa Cruz
1985	Náutico (17)	Santa Cruz
1986	Santa Cruz (19)	Sport
1987	Santa Cruz (20)	Sport
1988	Sport (25)	Náutico
1989	Náutico (18)	Santa Cruz
1990	Santa Cruz (21)	Sport
1991	Sport (26)	Náutico
1992	Sport (27)	Náutico
1993	Santa Cruz (22)	Náutico
1994	Sport (28)	Náutico
1995	Santa Cruz (23)	Náutico
1996	Sport (29)	Santa Cruz
1997	Sport (30)	Porto
1998	Sport (31)	Porto
1999	Sport (32)	Santa Cruz
2000	Sport (33)	Santa Cruz
2001	Náutico (19)	Santa Cruz
2002	Náutico (20)	Santa Cruz
2003	Sport (34)	Santa Cruz
2004	Náutico (21)	Santa Cruz
2005	Santa Cruz (24)	Náutico
2006	Sport (35)	Santa Cruz
2007	Sport (36)	Central
2008	Sport (37)	Náutico
2009	Sport (38)	Náutico
2010	Sport (39)	Náutico
2011	Santa Cruz (25)	Sport
2012	Santa Cruz (26)	Sport
2013	Santa Cruz (27)	Sport
2014	Sport (40)	Náutico
2015	Santa Cruz (28)	Salgueiro
2016	Santa Cruz (29)	Sport
2017	Sport (41)	Salgueiro
2018	Náutico (22)	Central
2019	Sport (42)	Náutico
2020	Salgueiro (1)	Santa Cruz
2021	Náutico (23)	Sport
2022	Náutico (24)	Retrô
2023	Sport (43)	Retrô
2024	Sport (44)	Náutico
2025	Sport (45)	Retrô
2026	Sport (46)	Náutico

== Titles by team ==
Teams in bold still active.

Rank	Club	Winners	Winning years
1	**Sport**	46	1916, 1917, 1920, 1923, 1924, 1925, 1928, 1938, 1941, 1942, 1943, 1948, 1949, 1953, 1955, 1956, 1958, 1961, 1962, 1975, 1977, 1980, 1981, 1982, 1988, 1991, 1992, 1994, 1996, 1997, 1998, 1999, 2000, 2003, 2006, 2007, 2008, 2009, 2010, 2014, 2017, 2019, 2023, 2024, 2025, 2026
2	**Santa Cruz**	29	1931, 1932, 1933, 1935, 1940, 1946, 1947, 1957, 1959, 1969, 1970, 1971, 1972, 1973, 1976, 1978, 1979, 1983, 1986, 1987, 1990, 1993, 1995, 2005, 2011, 2012, 2013, 2015, 2016
3	**Náutico**	24	1934, 1939, 1945, 1950, 1951, 1952, 1954, 1960, 1963, 1964, 1965, 1966, 1967, 1968, 1974, 1984, 1985, 1989, 2001, 2002, 2004, 2018, 2021, 2022
4	**América**	6	1918, 1919, 1921, 1922, 1927, 1944
5	Torre	3	1926, 1929, 1930
6	Tramways	2	1936, 1937
7	Flamengo de Recife	1	1915
7	**Salgueiro**	1	2020

=== By city ===
City	Championships	Clubs
Recife	111	Sport (46), Santa Cruz (29), Náutico (24), América (6), Torre (3), Tramways (2), Flamengo (1)
Salgueiro	1	Salgueiro (1)

== Copa Pernambuco ==
The Copa Pernambuco (English: Pernambuco Cup) is a competition contested in the second semester of the year, by Pernambuco state teams.

=== List of champions ===
Season	Winner	Runner-up
1994	Ypiranga	Vitória-PE
1995	Vitória-PE	Flamengo de Arcoverde
1996	Recife	Central
1997	Recife	Serrano
1998	Sport	Santa Cruz
1999	Porto	Central
2000	Recife	Sport
2001	Central	Decisão
2002	Recife	Intercontinental
2003	Sport	Náutico
2004	Vitória-PE	Centro Limoeirense
2005	Salgueiro	Sport
2006	Not held	
2007	Sport	Náutico
2008	Santa Cruz	Atlético Pernambucano
2009	Santa Cruz	Central
2010	Santa Cruz	Porto
2011	Náutico	Santa Cruz
2012	Santa Cruz	Porto
2013-18	Not held	
2019	Santa Cruz	Náutico
2020	Not held	

=== Titles by team ===
- 5 titles
  - Santa Cruz
- 4 titles
  - Recife
- 3 titles
  - Sport
- 2 titles
  - Vitória-PE
- 1 title
  - Central, Náutico, Porto, Salgueiro and Ypiranga

Recife FC was renamed as Manchete FC in 2005

== See also ==
- Campeonato Pernambucano (lower levels)
