= 2007 Clube Náutico Capibaribe season =

Náutico
2007 season
- Chairman: Ricardo Valois
- Manager: Hélio dos Anjos; Paulo César Gusmão; Roberto Fernandes
- Stadium: Estádio dos Aflitos
- Série A: 15th
- Pernambucano: 3rd
- Copa do Brasil: Round of 16
- Top goalscorer: League: Beto Acosta (19); All: Beto Acosta (23)
Home colours	Away colours	Third colours

The 2007 season was Náutico's 107th season in the club's history.

== Statistics ==
=== Overall ===
Games played	64 (18 Pernambucano, 8 Copa do Brasil, 38 Série A)
Games won	28 (10 Pernambucano, 4 Copa do Brasil, 14 Série A)
Games drawn	10 (1 Pernambucano, 2 Copa do Brasil, 7 Série A)
Games lost	26 (7 Pernambucano, 2 Copa do Brasil, 17 Série A)
Goals scored	124
Goals conceded	92
Goal difference	+32
Best results (goal difference)	6–0 (H) v Parnahyba – Copa do Brasil – 2007.02.21; 6–0 (H) v Ypiranga – Pernambucano – 2007.03.04; 6–0 (H) v Cabense – Pernambucano – 2007.03.18
Worst result (goal difference)	0–5 (A) v São Paulo – Série A – 2007.08.26
Top scorer	Beto Acosta (23)

Source: Náutico official website

=== Goalscorers ===
Place	Pos.	Nat.	Name	Campeonato Pernambucano	Copa do Brasil	Série A	Total
1	FW	(Uruguay)	Beto Acosta	3	1	19	23
2	FW	(Brazil)	Felipe	4	4	10	18
3	FW	(Brazil)	Kuki	9	4	0	13
4	MF	(Brazil)	Marcel	8	2	2	12
5	DF	(Brazil)	Sidny	0	1	6	7
6	MF	(Brazil)	Geraldo	0	0	5	5
6	DF	(Brazil)	Júlio César	0	0	5	5
7	FW	(Brazil)	Ferreira	0	0	4	4
8	FW	(Brazil)	Beto	0	2	0	2
8	FW	(Brazil)	Danilo Lins	2	0	0	2
8	MF	(Brazil)	Hamílton	0	0	2	2
8	MF	(Brazil)	Tales	0	0	2	2
8	MF	(Brazil)	Thiago Laranjeiras	2	0	0	2
8	DF	(Brazil)	Allyson	2	0	0	2
8	DF	(Brazil)	Deleu	1	1	0	2
8	FW	(Brazil)	Marcelinho	0	0	2	2
8	MF	(Brazil)	Marcelo Silva	0	0	2	2
8	MF	(Brazil)	Vágner Rosa	1	1	0	2
9	FW	(Brazil)	Anderson Lessa	1	0	0	1
9	DF	(Brazil)	Cris	0	0	1	1
9	MF	(Brazil)	Cristian	0	1	0	1
9	DF	(Brazil)	Edinho	0	1	0	1
9	MF	(Brazil)	Elicarlos	0	0	1	1
9	DF	(Brazil)	Fábio Silva	1	0	0	1
9	DF	(Brazil)	Índio Alagoano	1	0	0	1
9	MF	(Brazil)	João Victor	1	0	0	1
9	FW	(Brazil)	Jhon	1	0	0	1
9	DF	(Brazil)	Onildo	0	0	1	1
9	MF	(Brazil)	Radamés	0	0	1	1
9	DF	(Brazil)	Valença	0	1	0	1
9	MF	(Brazil)	Walker	1	0	0	1
			Own goals	1	0	3	4
			Total	39	19	66	124

== Competitions ==
=== Campeonato Pernambucano ===
==== First stage ====
14 January 2007 1	Ypiranga	2–1	Náutico	Santa Cruz do Capibaribe
16:00 (UTC-3)	Wellington 57'; Claudinho 58'		Danilo Lins 81'	Stadium: Estádio Otávio Limeira Alves

17 January 2007 2	Náutico	3–2	Porto	Recife
20:30 (UTC-3)	Danilo Lins 14'; Vágner Rosa 45'; Thiago Laranjeiras 47'		Gonçalves 25', 64'	Stadium: Estádio Eládio de Barros Carvalho (Aflitos)

20 January 2007 3	Náutico	4–1	Serrano	Recife
16:00 (UTC-3)	Fábio Silva 4'; Kuki 11', 21'; Thiago Laranjeiras 25'		Jean 22'	Stadium: Estádio Eládio de Barros Carvalho (Aflitos)

24 January 2007 4	Cabense	0–1	Náutico	Cabo de Santo Agostinho
20:40 (UTC-3)			João Victor 65' (pen.)	Stadium: Estádio Gileno de Carli

28 January 2007 5	Santa Cruz	2–0	Náutico	Recife
16:00 (UTC-3)	Marcelo Ramos 40', 67'			Stadium: Estádio José do Rego Maciel (Arruda)

31 January 2007 6	Náutico	3–2	Belo Jardim	Recife
20:40 (UTC-3)	Marcel,,		Clayton; Preto	Stadium: Estádio Eládio de Barros Carvalho (Aflitos)

5 February 2007 7	Náutico	0–1	Sport	Recife
20:30 (UTC-3)			Vitor Júnior 31'	Stadium: Estádio Eládio de Barros Carvalho (Aflitos)

8 February 2007 8	Central	0–1	Náutico	Caruaru
20:30 (UTC-3)			Kuki 35'	Stadium: Estádio Luiz José de Lacerda (Lacerdão)

11 February 2007 9	Vera Cruz	2–1	Náutico	Vitória de Santo Antão
15:00 (UTC-3)	Fabinho 24'; Dinda 31'		Felipe 56'	Stadium: Estádio Municipal Severino Cândido Carneiro

==== Second stage ====
4 March 2007 1	Náutico	6–0	Ypiranga	Recife
16:00 (UTC-3)	Índio Alagoano 41'; Kuki 60', 90+1'; Acosta 79'; Felipe 85', 86'			Stadium: Estádio Eládio de Barros Carvalho (Aflitos)

7 March 2007 2	Porto	4–3	Náutico	Caruaru
21:40 (UTC-3)	Gonçalves 4'; Val 19'; Luís Eduardo 46'; Pierre 82'		Marcel 32', 55'; Walker 72'	Stadium: Estádio Antônio Inácio de Souza

11 March 2007 3	Serrano	2–1	Náutico	Serra Talhada
16:00 (UTC-3)	Paulinho 41'; Eduardinho 80'		Kuki 39'	Stadium: Estádio Nildo Pereira de Menezes

18 March 2007 4	Náutico	6–0	Cabense	Recife
16:00 (UTC-3)	Kuki 18', 56', 90'; Felipe 33'; Marcel 44'; Jhon 86'			Stadium: Estádio Eládio de Barros Carvalho (Aflitos)

25 March 2007 5	Náutico	2–1	Santa Cruz	Recife
17:30 (UTC-3)	Marcel 49'; Allyson 61'		Adauto 83' (o.g.)	Stadium: Estádio Eládio de Barros Carvalho (Aflitos)

28 March 2007 6	Belo Jardim	0–1	Náutico	Belo Jardim
20:40 (UTC-3)			Marcel 26' (pen.)	Stadium: Estádio José Mendonça Bezerra

1 April 2007 7	Sport	2–0	Náutico	Recife
17:30 (UTC-3)	Weldon 36'; Luciano Henrique 64'	Report		Stadium: Estádio Adelmar da Costa Carvalho (Ilha do Retiro); Attendance: 32,048; Referee: Cláudio Mercante

8 April 2007 8	Náutico	5–0	Central	Recife
17:30 (UTC-3)	Allyson 22'; Acosta 39', 64'; Deleu 60'; Anderson Lessa 80'			Stadium: Estádio Eládio de Barros Carvalho (Aflitos)

11 April 2007 9	Náutico	1–1	Vera Cruz	Recife
20:30 (UTC-3)	(o.g.)	Report	Goal	Stadium: Estádio Eládio de Barros Carvalho (Aflitos)

==== Record ====
Final Position	Points	Matches	Wins	Draws	Losses	Goals For	Goals Away	Avg%
3rd	31	18	10	1	7	39	22	57%

=== Copa do Brasil ===
==== First round ====
14 February 2007	Parnahyba	1–2	Náutico	Parnaíba
21:45 (UTC-3)	Antônio Carlos 64' (pen.)		Felipe 61'; Edinho 90+2'	Stadium: Estádio Pedro Alelaf (Mão Santa); Attendance: 3,858; Referee: Marco Antônio S Sampaio

21 February 2007	Náutico	6–0	Parnahyba	Recife
21:30 (UTC-3)	Kuki 12', 21', 77'; Marcel 41', 63'; Cristian 55'			Stadium: Estádio Eládio de Barros Carvalho (Aflitos); Attendance: 5,872; Referee: Francisco de Assis Almeida Filho

==== Second round ====
21 March 2007	Paysandu	1–0	Náutico	Belém
21:45 (UTC-3)	Wellington Paulo 25'			Stadium: Estádio Leônidas Sodré de Castro (Curuzu); Attendance: 7,394; Referee: Françuar Fernandes da Silva

4 April 2007	Náutico	5–0	Paysandu	Recife
21:45 (UTC-3)	Valença 6'; Kuki 22'; Felipe 28', 42', 53'			Stadium: Estádio Eládio de Barros Carvalho (Aflitos); Attendance: 6,668; Referee: Émerson Batista da Silva

==== Oitavas de final ====
18 April 2007	Náutico	2–2	Corinthians	Recife
21:45 (UTC-3)	Beto 52'; Sidny 83'		Magrão 15'; Jean 41'	Stadium: Estádio Eládio de Barros Carvalho (Aflitos); Attendance: 19,759; Referee: João Alberto Gomes Duarte

26 April 2007	Corinthians	0–2	Náutico	São Paulo
20:30 (UTC-3)			Vágner Rosa 15'; Acosta 45'	Stadium: Estádio Municipal Paulo Machado de Carvalho (Pacaembu); Attendance: 27,794; Referee: Evandro Rogério Roman

==== Quartas de Final ====
2 May 2007	Náutico	2–2	Figueirense	Recife
21:45 (UTC-3)	Beto 57'; Deleu 61'		Victor Simões 73', 78'	Stadium: Estádio Eládio de Barros Carvalho (Aflitos); Attendance: 14,539; Referee: Paulo César de Oliveira

9 May 2007	Figueirense	1–0	Náutico	Florianópolis
21:45 (UTC-3)	Victor Simões			Stadium: Estádio Orlando Scarpelli; Attendance: 11,330; Referee: Héber Roberto Lopes

==== Record ====
Final Position	Points	Matches	Wins	Draws	Losses	Goals For	Goals Away	Avg%
5th	14	8	4	2	2	19	7	58%

=== Série A ===
13 May 2007 1	Atlético Mineiro	2–1	Náutico	Belo Horizonte
16:00 (UTC-3)	Lima 26'; Germano 90+4'	Report	Acosta 9'	Stadium: Estádio Governador Magalhães Pinto (Mineirão); Attendance: 5,116; Referee: Elmo Alves Rezende

20 May 2007 2	Náutico	1–0	São Paulo	Recife
18:10 (UTC-3)	Acosta 78'	Report		Stadium: Estádio Eládio de Barros Carvalho (Aflitos); Attendance: 18,512; Referee: Washington Alves de Souza

27 May 2007 3	Náutico	2–2	Vasco da Gama	Recife
16:00 (UTC-3)	Marcel 49' (pen.); Cris 60'	Report	Moraes 25' (pen.), 83'	Stadium: Estádio Eládio de Barros Carvalho (Aflitos); Attendance: 15,507; Referee: Domingos Viana Filho

4 June 2007 4	Internacional	2–0	Náutico	Porto Alegre
20:30 (UTC-3)	Iarley 22'; Alex 40'	Report		Stadium: Estádio Eládio de Barros Carvalho (Aflitos); Attendance: 12,286; Referee: Paulo Henrique Bezerra

9 June 2007 5	Náutico	4–4	Paraná	Recife
18:10 (UTC-3)	Marcel 28'; Felipe 47'; Acosta 81' (pen.), 84'	Report	Neguette 10'; Vandinho 12'; Josiel 16', 58'	Stadium: Estádio Eládio de Barros Carvalho (Aflitos); Attendance: 11,226; Referee: João Alberto Duarte

17 June 2007 6	Botafogo	3–1	Náutico	Rio de Janeiro
18:10 (UTC-3)	Juninho 24'; André Lima 75'; Jorge Henrique 78'	Report	Alex Bruno 54' (o.g.)	Stadium: Estádio Jornalista Mário Filho (Maracanã); Attendance: 25,967; Referee: Luiz Alberto Bites

24 June 2007 7	Náutico	0–2	Goiás	Recife
18:10 (UTC-3)		Report	Fabrício Carvalho 55', 67' (pen.)	Stadium: Estádio Eládio de Barros Carvalho (Aflitos); Attendance: 10,397; Referee: Lourival Dias Filho

28 June 2007 8	Sport	4–1	Náutico	Recife
20:30 (UTC-3)	Durval 4'; Carlinhos Bala 11', 50'; Washington 58'	Report	Hamílton 76'	Stadium: Estádio Adelmar da Costa Carvalho (Ilha do Retiro); Attendance: 22,745; Referee: Wilson Souza Mendonça

3 July 2007 9	Atlético Paranaense	1–1	Náutico	Curitiba
20:30 (UTC-3)	Pedro Oldoni 52'	Report	Michel 24' (o.g.)	Stadium: Kyocera Arena (Arena da Baixada); Attendance: 4,998; Referee: Marcelo de Lima Henrique

7 July 2007 10	Náutico	0–1	Palmeiras	Recife
18:10 (UTC-3)		Report	Luiz Henrique 90+4'	Stadium: Estádio Eládio de Barros Carvalho (Aflitos); Attendance: 11,015; Referee: Djalma José Beltrami

12 July 2007 11	Juventude	1–1	Náutico	Caxias do Sul
20:30 (UTC-3)	Wescley 55'	Report	Sidny 57'	Stadium: Estádio Alfredo Jaconi; Attendance: 2,086; Referee: Giulliano Bozzano

18 July 2007 12	Náutico	1–4	Cruzeiro	Recife
21:45 (UTC-3)	Tales 1'	Report	Rôni 12'; Wágner 59'; Araújo 73'; Leandro Domingues 85'	Stadium: Estádio Eládio de Barros Carvalho (Aflitos); Attendance: 9,527; Referee: Wallace Nascimento Valente

22 July 2007 13	Corinthians	0–3	Náutico	São Paulo
16:00 (UTC-3)		Report	Ferreira 42'; Hamílton 64'; Felipe 90'	Stadium: Estádio Cícero Pompeu de Toledo (Morumbi); Attendance: 17,937; Referee: Paulo Henrique Bezerra

25 July 2007 14	Náutico	0–2	Grêmio	Recife
20:30 (UTC-3)		Report	Tuta 30'; Carlos Eduardo 82'	Stadium: Estádio Eládio de Barros Carvalho (Aflitos); Attendance: 13,000; Referee: Sálvio Spínola Fagundes Filho

28 July 2007 15	Santos	1–2	Náutico	Santos
(UTC-3)	Kléber Pereira 87'	Report	Elicarlos 39'; Acosta 65'	Stadium: Estádio Urbano Caldeira (Vila Belmiro); Attendance: 8,321; Referee: João Alberto Duarte

1 August 2007 16	Náutico	0–0	Fluminense	Recife
19:30 (UTC-3)				Stadium: Estádio Eládio de Barros Carvalho (Aflitos); Attendance: 11,835; Referee: Wilson Luiz Seneme

4 August 2007 17	América de Natal	1–5	Náutico	Natal
18:10 (UTC-3)	Carlos Eduardo 64'		Rogélio 33' (o.g.); Radamés 45+2'; Felipe 56'; Sidny 73', 88'	Stadium: Estádio Dr. João Cláudio Vasconcelos Machado (Machadão); Attendance: 5,280; Referee: Sérgio Carvalho

8 August 2007 18	Náutico	4–2	Figueirense	Recife
20:30 (UTC-3)	Felipe 9', 39'; Tales 43'; Felipe 69'		Otacílio Neto 48'; Peter 86'	Stadium: Estádio Eládio de Barros Carvalho (Aflitos); Attendance: 11,208; Referee: Lourival Dias Lima Filho

11 August 2007 19	Flamengo	2–1	Náutico	Rio de Janeiro
18:10 (UTC-3)	Fábio Luciano 24'; Léo Moura 87'		Felipe 11'	Stadium: Estádio Jornalista Mário Filho (Maracanã); Attendance: 34,457; Referee: Paulo César de Oliveira

19 August 2007 20	Náutico	0–1	Atlético Mineiro	Recife
16:00 (UTC-3)			Dyego Coelho 62'	Stadium: Estádio Eládio de Barros Carvalho (Aflitos); Attendance: 13,432; Referee: Wilson Luiz Seneme

26 August 2007 21	São Paulo	5–0	Náutico	São Paulo
16:00 (UTC-3)	Dagoberto 56'; Rogério Ceni 64' (pen.); Hugo 72', 90'; Aloísio 74'	Report		Stadium: Estádio Cícero Pompeu de Toledo (Morumbi); Attendance: 40,029; Referee: Wagner Tardelli

30 August 2007 22	Vasco da Gama	4–1	Náutico	Rio de Janeiro
20:30 (UTC-3)	Leandro Amaral 20' (pen.); Marcelinho 74', 89'; Rubens Júnior 86'		Marcelinho 56'	Stadium: Estádio Vasco da Gama (São Januário); Attendance: 9,619; Referee: Luiz Alberto Bites

2 September 2007 23	Náutico	1–1	Internacional	Recife
18:10 (UTC-3)	Sidny 68'		Adriano 44'	Stadium: Estádio Eládio de Barros Carvalho (Aflitos); Attendance: 4,895; Referee: Gutemberg P Fonseca

6 September 2007 24	Paraná	2–4	Náutico	Curitiba
20:30 (UTC-3)	Beto 65'; Josiel 78'		Acosta 6'; Júlio César 62'; Geraldo 73'; Marcelo Silva 86'	Stadium: Estádio Durival Britto e Silva (Vila Capanema); Attendance: 2,860; Referee: Giulliano Bozzano

9 September 2007 25	Náutico	4–1	Botafogo	Recife
(UTC-3)	Acosta 29', 36' (pen.), 57' (pen.), 89'		Juninho 2'	Stadium: Estádio Eládio de Barros Carvalho (Aflitos); Attendance: 6,622; Referee: Rogério Cintra

15 September 2007 26	Goiás	0–3	Náutico	Goiânia
18:10 (UTC-3)			Acosta 33' (pen.), 54'; Geraldo 74'	Stadium: Estádio do Governo do Estado de Goiás (Serra Dourada); Attendance: 2,742; Referee: Gutemberg Fonseca

23 September 2007 27	Náutico	2–0	Sport	Recife
16:00 (UTC-3)	Júlio César 37', 78'	Report		Stadium: Estádio Eládio de Barros Carvalho (Aflitos); Attendance: 19,135; Referee: Emerson Luiz Sobral

29 September 2007 28	Náutico	5–0	Atlético Paranaense	Recife
18:10 (UTC-3)	Marcelinho 4'; Acosta 20'; Felipe 31', 77'; Marcelo Silva 90'			Stadium: Estádio Eládio de Barros Carvalho (Aflitos); Attendance: 10,129; Referee: João Alberto Gomes Duarte

3 October 2007 29	Palmeiras	2–1	Náutico	São Paulo
19:30 (UTC-3)	Caio 63', 68'		Felipe 25'	Stadium: Estádio Palestra Itália (Parque Antártica); Attendance: 8,980; Referee: Carlos Eugênio Simon

6 October 2007 30	Náutico	4–1	Juventude	Recife
18:10 (UTC-3)	Geraldo 4' (pen.), 68'; Ferreira 43'; Felipe 85'		Vanzini 60'	Stadium: Estádio Eládio de Barros Carvalho (Aflitos); Attendance: 12,391; Referee: Luiz Alberto Sardinha Bites

12 October 2007 31	Cruzeiro	2–2	Náutico	Belo Horizonte
20:30 (UTC-3)	Alecsandro 31'; Ângelo 35'		Acosta 62', 77'	Stadium: Estádio Governador Magalhães Pinto (Mineirão); Attendance: 26,727; Referee: Gutemberg de Paula Fonseca

21 October 2007 32	Náutico	1–0	Corinthians	Recife
16:00 (UTC-3)	Geraldo 90' (pen.)			Stadium: Estádio Eládio de Barros Carvalho (Aflitos); Attendance: 19,880; Referee: Héber Roberto Lopes

27 October 2007 33	Grêmio	4–3	Náutico	Porto Alegre
16:00 (UTC-3)	Tuta 11'; Marcel 21', 70'; Diego Souza 42'	Report	Onildo 6'; Acosta 43'; Júlio César 46'	Stadium: Estádio Olímpico Monumental; Attendance: 32,999; Referee: José Henrique de Carvalho

31 October 2007 34	Náutico	1–2	Santos	Recife
21:45 (UTC-3)	Felipe 15'	Report	Kléber Pereira 45'; Pedrinho 86'	Stadium: Estádio Eládio de Barros Carvalho (Aflitos); Attendance: 15,252; Referee: Héber Roberto Lopes

3 November 2007 35	Fluminense	2–1	Náutico	Rio de Janeiro
18:10 (UTC-3)	Gabriel 43', 81'		Acosta 84' (pen.)	Stadium: Estádio Jornalista Mário Filho (Maracanã); Attendance: 17,814; Referee: Sérgio da Silva Carvalho

10 November 2007 36	Náutico	4–0	América de Natal	Recife
18:10 (UTC-3)	Júlio César 38'; Ferreira 58', 81'; Sidny 75'			Stadium: Estádio Eládio de Barros Carvalho (Aflitos); Attendance: 14,998; Referee: Sérgio da Silva Carvalho

28 November 2007 37	Figueirense	2–0	Náutico	Florianópolis
21:45 (UTC-3)	Ruy 72'; Otacílio Neto 83'			Stadium: Estádio Orlando Scarpelli; Attendance: 3,467; Referee: Frederico Honorato Moreira

2 December 2007 38	Náutico	1–0	Flamengo	Recife
16:00 (UTC-3)	Sidny 79'			Stadium: Estádio Eládio de Barros Carvalho (Aflitos); Attendance: 17,988; Referee: Paulo César Oliveira

==== Record ====
Final Position	Points	Matches	Wins	Draws	Losses	Goals For	Goals Away	Avg%
15th	49	38	14	7	17	66	63	43%
