= Cordeiro =

Cordeiro is a Portuguese language surname. The equivalent in Spanish is Cordero. Notable people with the surname include:

- Acácio Cordeiro Barreto, Brazilian international footballer
- André Cordeiro (water polo) (born 1967), Brazilian water polo goalkeeper
- André Cordeiro (swimmer) (born 1974), Brazilian freestyle swimmer
- António Cordeiro (1641–1722), Portuguese Catholic priest, Azorean historian, author of the classical chronicle Historia Insulana
- Cristiano Cordeiro, Brazil born Hong Kong international footballer
- Domingas Cordeiro (born 1976), Angolan handball player
- Douglas Cordeiro (born 1979), Brazilian male volleyball player
- Duarte Cordeiro (born 1979), Portuguese economist and politician
- Edson Cordeiro (born 1967), sopranist countertenor and pop and jazz singer
- Flávio Elias Cordeiro (born 1975), Brazilian football player
- Gauss Moutinho Cordeiro (born 1952), Brazilian engineer, mathematician and statistician
- Jorge Cordeiro, (born 1978), professional football coach and former player
- Joseph Cordeiro (1918–1994), the first Pakistani cardinal
- Lorna Cordeiro, Konkani language singer from the state of Goa, India
- Lucas Cordeiro (born 1991), Brazilian professional footballer
- Luciano Cordeiro (1844–1900), Portuguese writer, historian, politician and geographer
- Manoel Cordeiro Valença Neto (born 1982), Brazilian footballer
- Manuel Cordeiro (born 1983), Portuguese football manager since 2005
- Marcelo Cordeiro (born 1981), Brazilian footballer
- Margarida Cordeiro (born 1939), Portuguese psychologist and film director from Mogadouro
- Mauricio Plenckauskas Cordeiro, Brazilian footballer
- Moacyr Cordeiro (1921–1989), Brazilian footballer
- Otto Maximiliano Pereira de Cordeiro Ferreira (born 1968), Brazilian singer
- Pedro Cordeiro (born 1963), former professional tennis player from Portugal
- Pico do Brejo do Cordeiro, peak on the island of São Jorge in the Azores
- "Uncle Ray" — Ray Cordeiro (1924–2023), Hong Kong media personality
- Ronan Cordeiro (born 1997), Brazilian para-triathlete
- Rodrigo Crasso Cordeiro (born 1987), Brazilian footballer
- Rui Cordeiro (born 1976), Portuguese rugby union footballer
- Ryan Cordeiro (born 1986), American former professional soccer player
- Sandro Raniere Guimarães Cordeiro (born 1989), Brazilian footballer
- Saulo Batista de Andrade Cordeiro (born 1979), retired Brazilian footballer
- Vasco Cordeiro (born 1973), President of the Regional Government of the Azores
- Vera Cordeiro (born 1950), social entrepreneur and physician

Fiction:

- Fran Cordeiro, central character in the novel The Meadows of the Moon by James Hilton

== Other ==
- Cordeiro, Rio de Janeiro
- Pico do Brejo do Cordeiro, peak on the island of São Jorge in the Azores
- Corceiro, similarly spelled surname
