= Crasso =

Crasso is a surname. Notable people with the surname include:

- Francesco Crasso (1500–1566), Italian Roman Catholic cardinal
- Rodrigo Crasso (born 1987), Brazilian footballer
