= Sabugy Futebol Clube =

Brazilian football club

Sabugy
- Full name: Sabugy Futebol Clube
- Nickname: Gavião do Vale
- Founded: 1923
- Ground: Amigão
- Capacity: 35,000
- Chairman: Malaquias Filho
- Manager: Gerúsio da Luz
- League: Campeonato Paraibano de Futebol - Segunda Divisão
Home colours	Away colours

Sabugy Futebol Clube is a Brazilian sports association, based in the city of Santa Luzia, in the state of Paraíba. It currently competes in the Campeonato Paraibano de Futebol - Segunda Divisão.

== History ==
Sabugy was founded on April 9, 1923. Its first president was Manoel Bianor de Freitas. On September 7, 1923, he played his first match, winning over São Mamede Esporte Clube, by a score of 1–0. The team was lined up with: Gil Gonçalves, Manoel Medeiros, Solon Machado, Chico Graciano, Manoel Pequeno, Aderbal Vilar, Chico Soares, Moacir Medeiros, Manoel Bianor de Freitas, Manoel Benício and Noberto Baracuy.

Until the 1960s, Luís Marinho highlights the victories obtained in Caicó and São José do Seridó (Rio Grande do Norte), including winning twice the selection of Caicó. He won a trophy in dispute with a team from the city of Patos, and finally won the competition organized by teams from São Mamede, Juazeirinho, Santa Luzia and Soledade, Paraíba.

== Stadium ==
- The 1st field of Sabugy was built in the area where the Coelho Lisboa School Group is located (where the old road used to be).
- The 2nd field of Sabugy, from the house of Mr. Sabino Eugênio (current Loja Criet), was inaugurated on December 12, 1928, with a clash between our Sabugy, and Vila Nova de Caicó, with Sabugy winning 3–0.
- The 3rd field of Sabugy – when the new weir bled for the first time on 12 March 1934, the waters invaded the location of the 2nd field, making games in that location unfeasible. A new location was then chosen (the current one), which was built in the area belonging to Major Inácio Machado, whose deed of donation was drawn up by his son, Jovino Machado da Nóbrega, having later received the name of “Machadão” in honor of his son Augusto Machado da Nóbrega.
- In 2021, for the Campeonato Paraibano de Futebol - Segunda Divisão, the club will train at Vila Olímpica Plínio Lemos and play their games at the stadium Amigão, both in Campina Grande, since Machadão was not able to host competition matches and José Cavalcanti, in Patos, was not released.
