= Wagner Ribeiro =

Wagner Ribeiro may refer to:

- Wagner Ribeiro (football agent), Brazilian football agent
- Wagner Ribeiro (footballer) (born 1987), Croatian footballer
