= Sidney dos Santos =

Sidney dos Santos may refer to:

- Sidney Cristiano dos Santos (born 1981), Brazilian footballer
- Sidny Feitosa dos Santos (born 1981), Brazilian footballer
