= Corceiro =

Surname list

Corceiro is a Portuguese surname.

== List of people with the surname ==
- David Corceiro (born 1977), French politician
- Margarida Corceiro (born 2002), Portuguese actress

== See also ==
- Cordeiro
