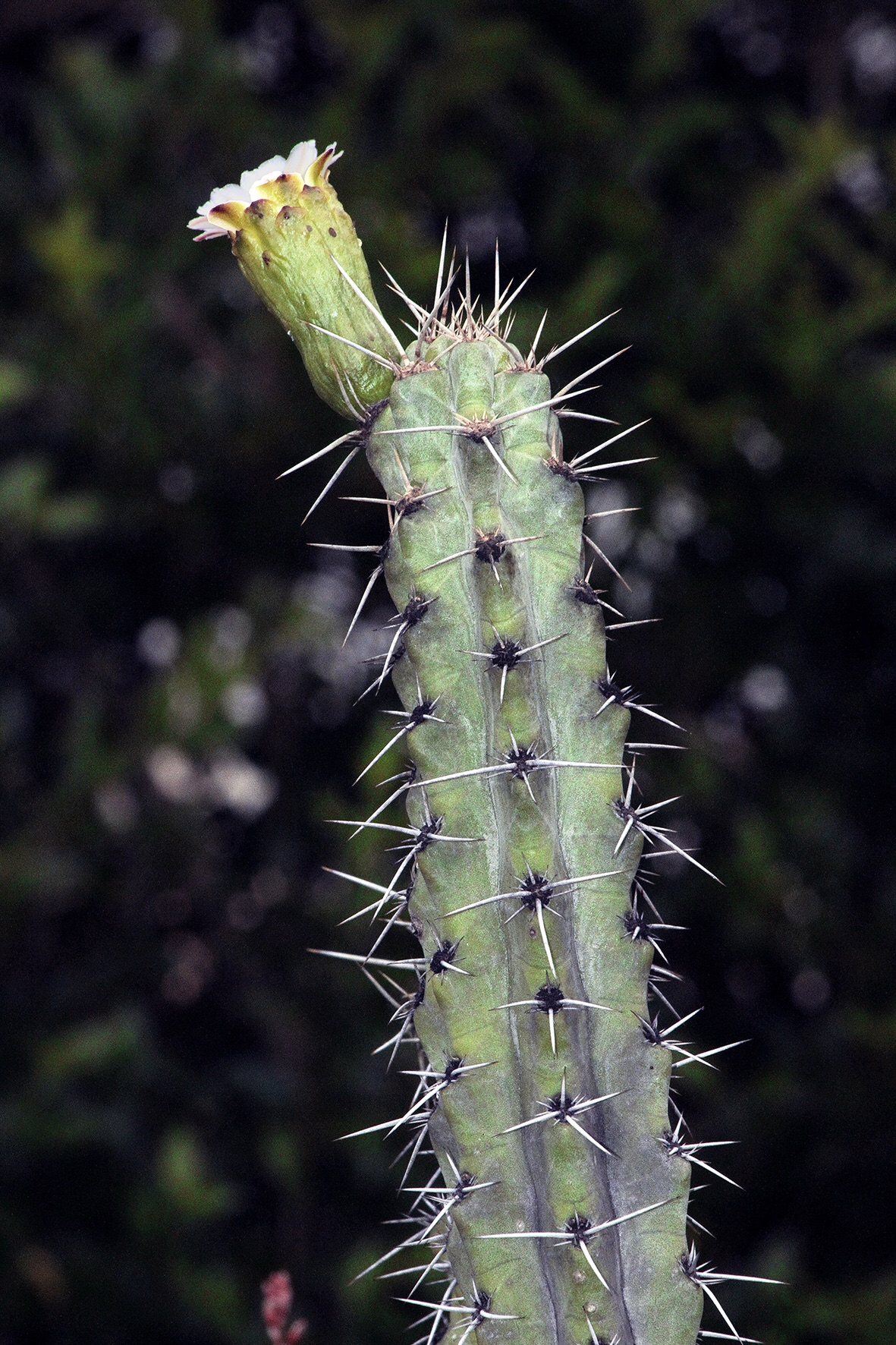

Conservation status
- Least Concern (IUCN 3.1)

Scientific classification
- Kingdom: Plantae
- Clade: Tracheophytes
- Clade: Angiosperms
- Clade: Eudicots
- Order: Caryophyllales
- Family: Cactaceae
- Subfamily: Cactoideae
- Genus: Xiquexique
- Species: X. tuberculatus

Binomial name
- Xiquexique tuberculatus (Werderm.) Lavor & Calvente 2020

= Xiquexique tuberculatus =

Species of cactus

Xiquexique tuberculatus is a plant species in the genus Xiquexique from the cactus family. It is commonly called "Caxacubri".

== Description ==
Xiquexique tuberculatus grows like a tree with an often clearly pronounced trunk and reaches a height 2 metres (6.6 ft) to 6 metres (20 ft). Abundantly branching near the shoot tips, it is spreading and up to 6 meters wide. The heavily woody, upright to crooked, olive-green shoots have a diameter of 3 to 6 centimeters and are overgrown when young. There are 4 to 6 ribs with conspicuous oblique transverse furrows. The furrows between the ribs are arched. The stinging, somewhat brittle, protruding thorns are light brown at first and later turn gray. Of the 3 to 5, 3 to 4.2 centimeters long central spines, the lowest is usually the longest and often bent downwards. The 10 to 12 radiating, downward curved radial spines are 4 to 10 millimeters long. The flowering part of the shoots is not pronounced. Flowering areoles are located near the shoot tip.

The flowers are 6 to 6.7 centimeters long and have a diameter of up to 3 centimeters. The spherical fruits reach a diameter of up to 4 centimeters, tear open at the side and contain magenta-colored flesh.

== Distribution ==
The distribution area of Xiquexique tuberculatus extends from the northwest to the northeast of the Brazilian state of Bahia and extends into the state of Pernambuco.

In the IUCN Red List of Threatened Species, the species is listed as "Least Concern (LC)".

== Taxonomy ==
The first description as Pilocereus tuberculatus was published in 1933 by Erich Werdermann. Pâmela Lavor and Alice Calvente placed the species in the genus Xiquexique in 2020. Other nomenclatural synonyms are Pilosocereus tuberculatus (Werderm.) Byles & G. D. Rowley (1957) and Pseudopilocereus tuberculatus (Werderm.) Buxb. (1968).

The specific epithet tuberculatus comes from Latin, means 'humped' and refers to the humped ribs of the shoots.
