= Beto Acosta =

Uruguayan footballer (born 1977)

Personal information
- Full name: Alberto Martín Acosta Martínez
- Date of birth: 23 January 1977 (age 49)
- Place of birth: Montevideo, Uruguay
- Height: 1.88 m (6 ft 2 in)
- Position: Centre forward

Youth career
- 1990–1994: Defensor Sporting

Senior career*
Years	Team	Apps	(Gls)
1994–1996	Defensor Sporting	30	(18)
1997	Platense Wanderers	5	(2)
1998–2005	Cerrito	294	(96)
2005–2007	Peñarol	41	(4)
2007	Náutico	31	(19)
2008–2009	Corinthians	27	(5)
2009	→ Náutico (loan)	8	(0)
2010	Cerrito	8	(2)
2010–2011	Brasiliense	19	(3)
2012	Central	5	(0)
2012	Brasiliense	3	(0)
2013	Resende	8	(0)
2013	CEOV	0	(0)
2014	União Barbarense	3	(0)
2014–2016	Santos-AP	22	(6)
2016	Botafogo-DF	4	(2)
2017	Taboão da Serra	19	(9)
2017	Sete de Dourados	2	(0)
2017	Taboão da Serra	0	(0)
2018	Cerrito	10	(2)
2019	Tricordiano	0	(0)
2019	Independente de Tucuruí	0	(0)
2019	Taboão da Serra	6	(1)
2019	Santos-AP	0	(0)
2019	Sabugy	1	(0)
2019	Atlético Carioca	6	(2)
2020	Taguatinga	6	(2)
2020	Barcelona de Ilhéus	2	(2)
2020	Penarol	4	(0)
2021	Capital	0	(0)
- * Club domestic league appearances and goals as of 19:05, 9 February 2021 (UTC)

Alberto Martín Acosta Martínez (born 23 January 1977) is a Uruguayan former professional footballer who played as a striker.

Beto Acosta has amassed nearly 500 career league appearances and more than 150 (league) goals from the positions of striker, attacking midfielder and wingback for a variety of different clubs throughout South America.

== Career ==
Beto started his career at Defensor Sporting as a promising youth player, being fast-tracked into the first team and making his senior début for the club at the age of just 17. In two seasons, he scored 18 times in 30 league matches for Defensor.

He transferred to Platense Wanderers in 1997, making just 5 appearances in the domestic league, scoring twice, before joining Club Sportivo Cerrito the following year for 17,000 UYU.

He is perhaps best remembered for his time at Club Sportivo Cerrito, where he became a cult hero, scoring 96 goals in 294 league games (137 in 346 in all competitions), and captaining the club on more than 60 occasions. After leaving Cerrito, Beto suffered a dip in form which saw him be frozen out of the Uruguay national team for the first time in his career, a factor that would eventually lead him to retire from the international scene.

Beto's exploits in Brazil saw him play most notably for Clube Náutico Capibaribe, where he was reasonably successful. Beto continued to ply his trade in Brazil.

== Honours ==
=== Individual ===
- Campeonato Brasileiro Série A Team of the Year: 2007
