= Topo Volcanic Complex =

Volcanic Complex of Topo
- Volcanic complex
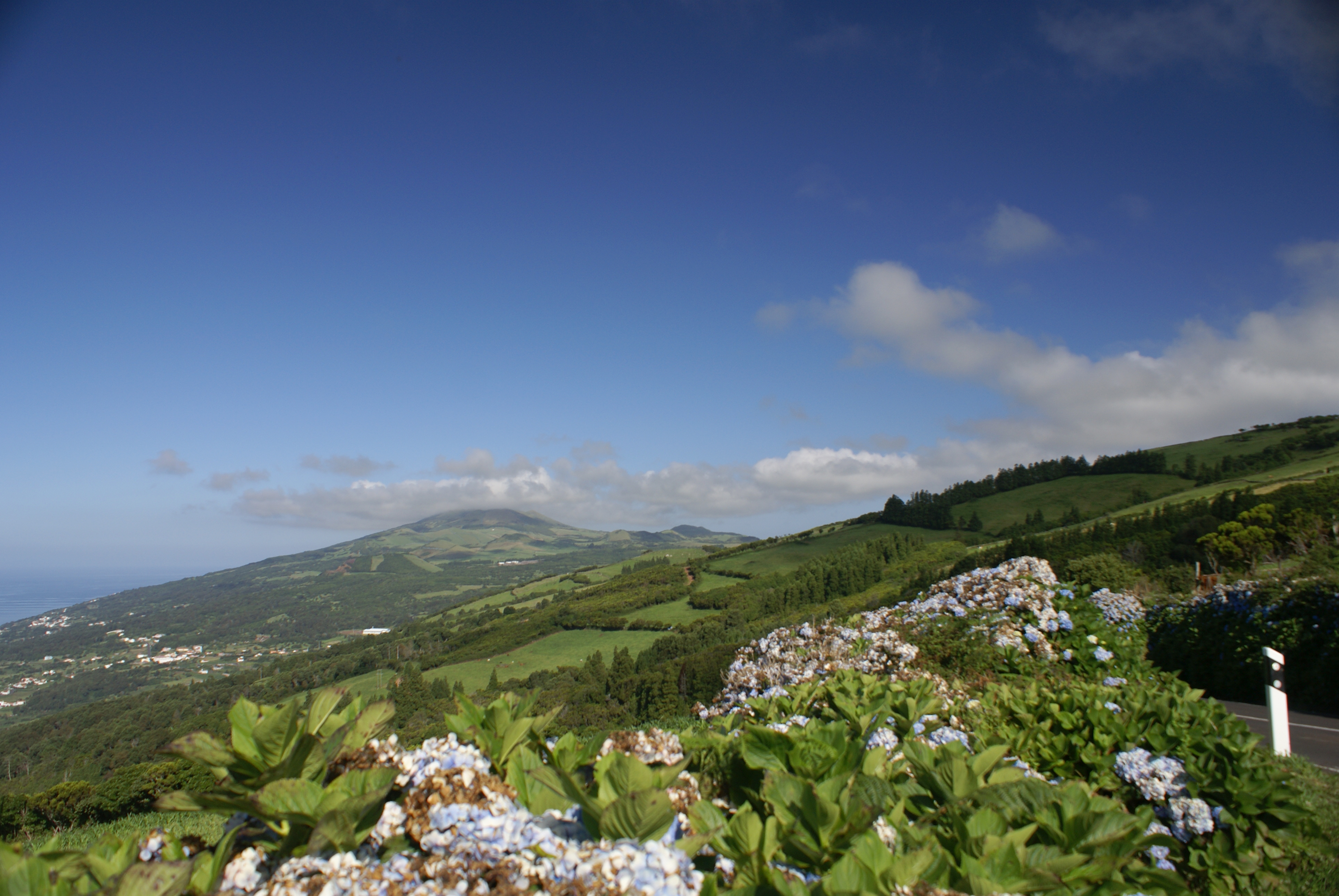
- A view of the mountainous hills of the Topo Volcanic Complex

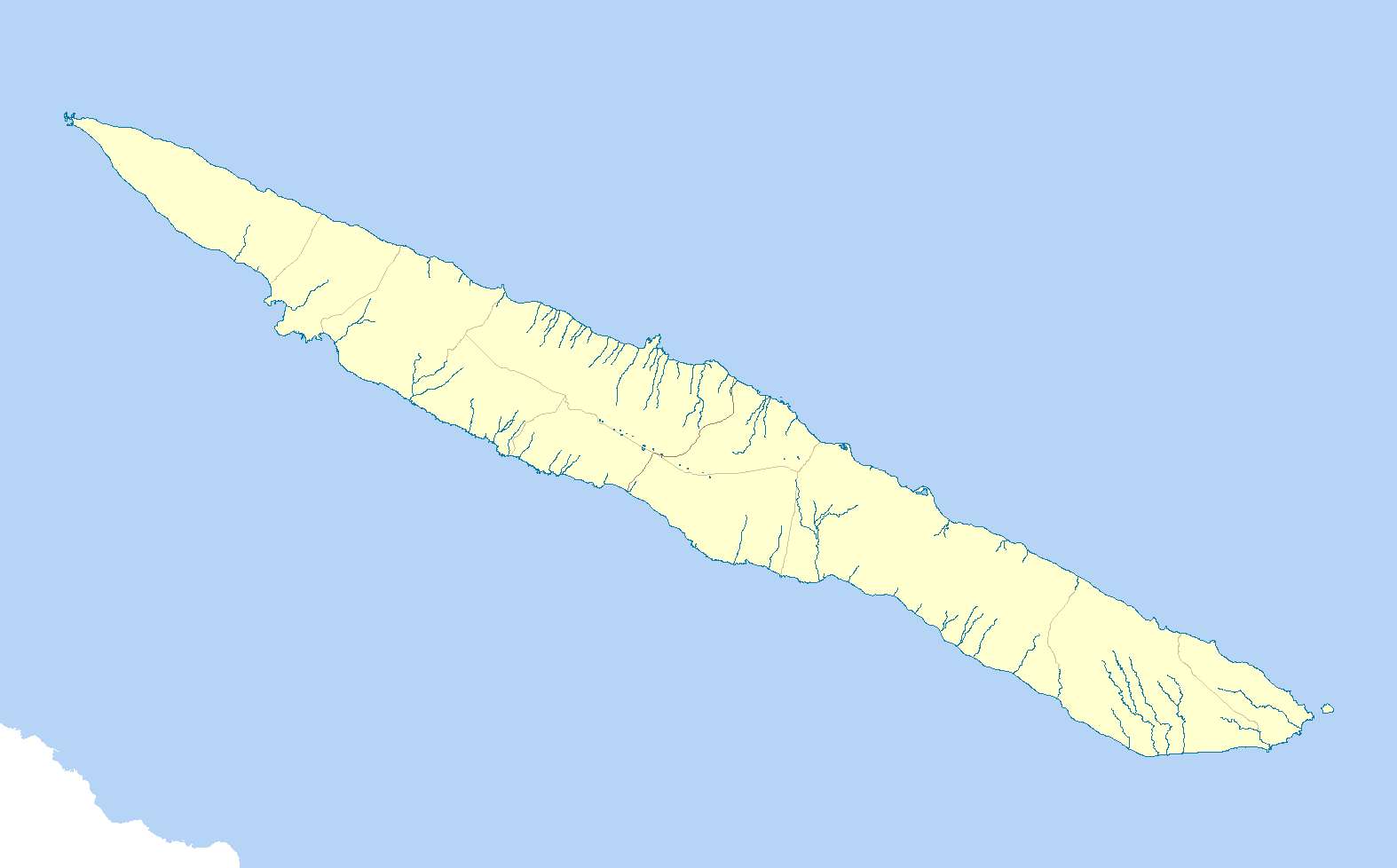
- Location of the complex on the island of São Jorge
- Coordinates: 38.574°N 27.862°W
- Location: Eastern Group, name = Azores, Portugal
- Geology: Alkali basalt

Volcanic Complex of Topo (Portuguese: Complexo Vulcânico do Topo) is a complex of scoria cones and volcanic structures, located near the village Topo in the southeastern part of the island of São Jorge, in the Portuguese archipelago of the Azores.

== History ==
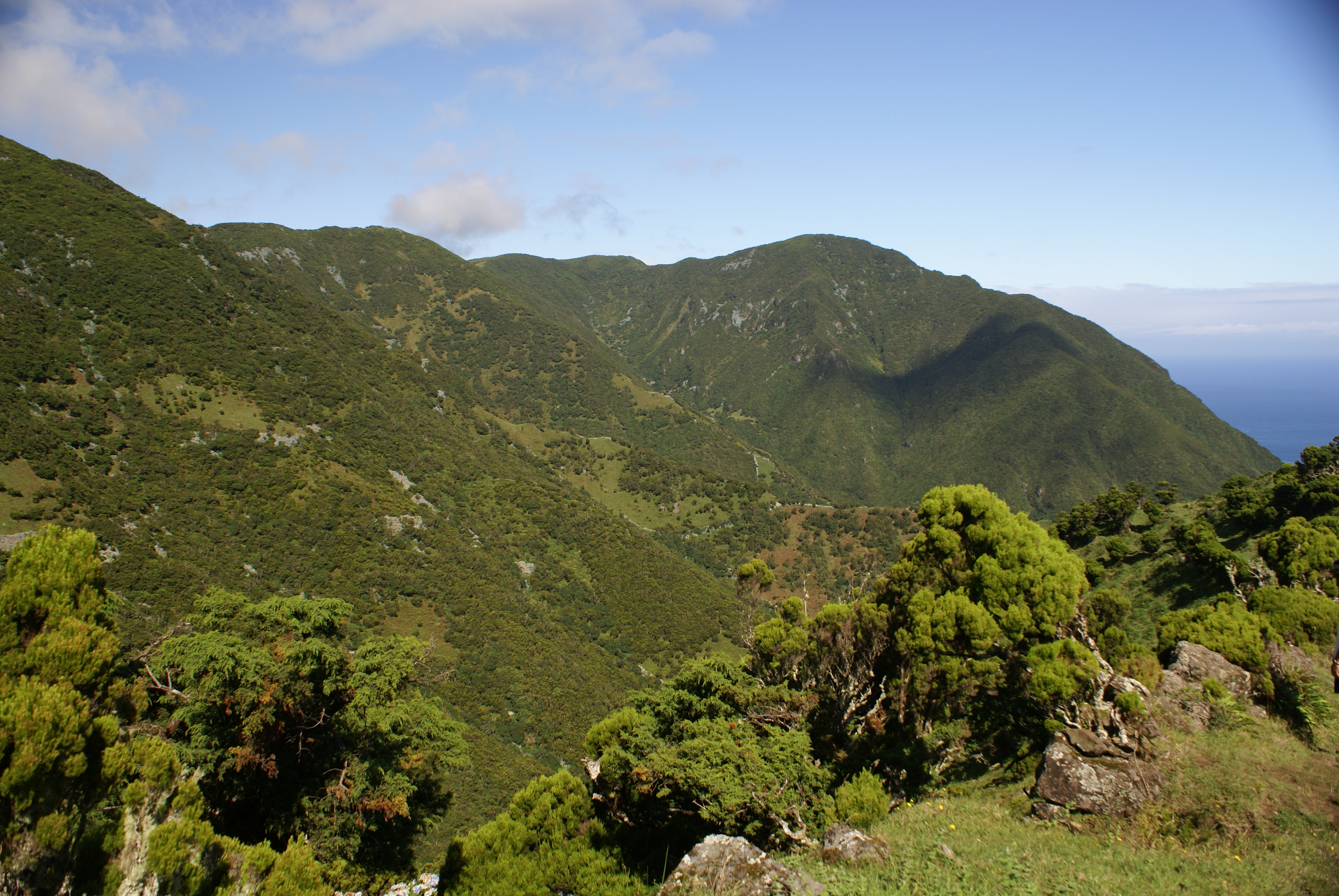
The view of the crater valley of the caldera of Santo Cristo, on the northern coast of the complex

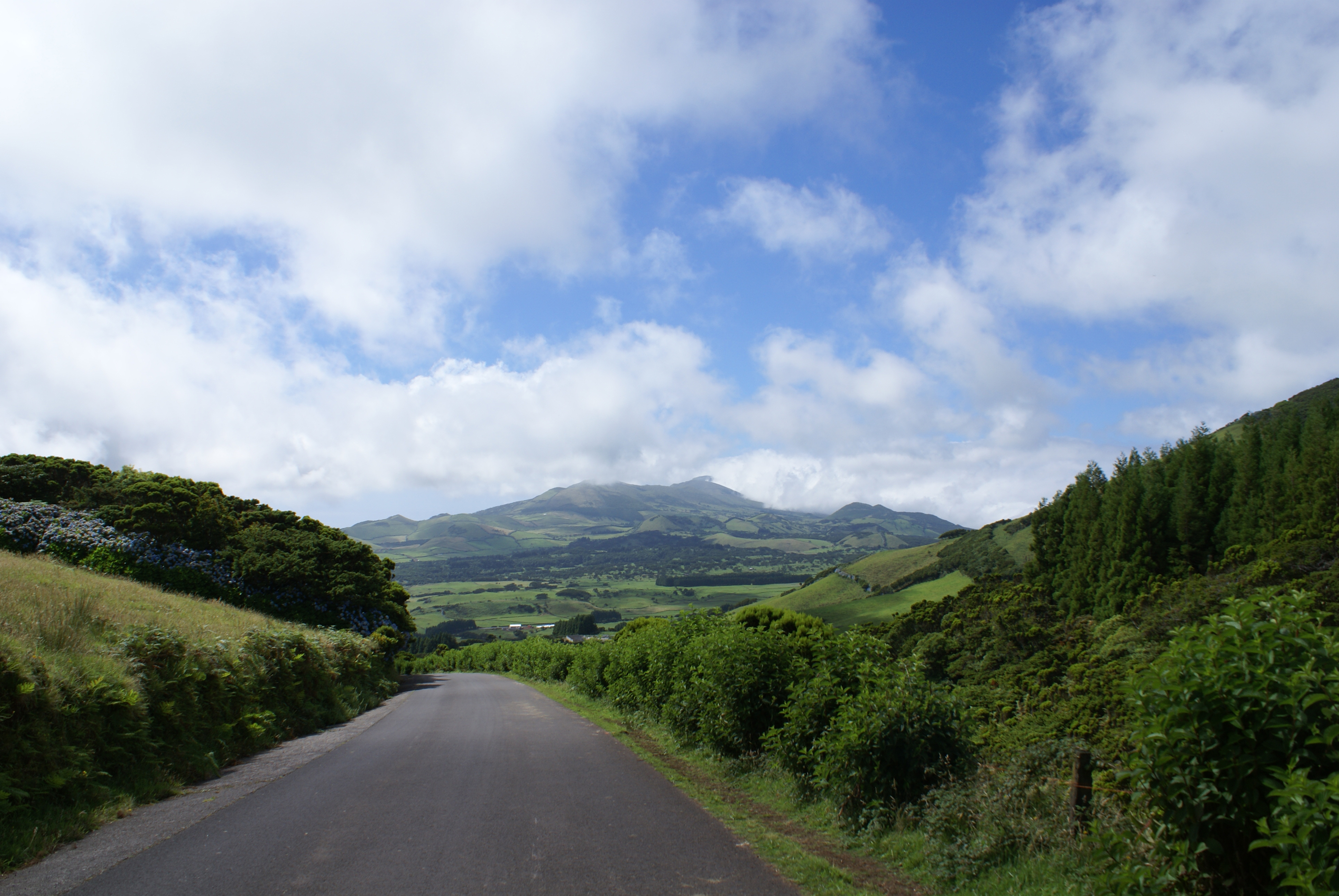
The main roadway in the Topo complex between Nossa Senhora do Rosário and Santo Antão

The base of the Topo complex originated in numerous shield volcanoes, erupting from primordial fissural faults that ran along a northwest to southeast and east-southeast to west-northwest alignment. These structures are only observed in the curvature of the higher turf cones, as far as 700 metres (2,300 ft) above sea level. These activities initiated around 600,000 years ago. The island of São Jorge had its initial formation from the rising of magma along these fractures through the Earth's crust, resulting in effusive volcanism from the area east of Ribeira Seca until Topo (from which it got its name).

Owing to age, continuous effusive eruptions occurred simultaneously with the eruption on the island of Faial, along the Volcanic Complex of Ribeirinha. Volcanism in this zone continued, with some interruptions over the next 500,000 years approximately. But, continuous erosion, from coastal action, humidity and rainfall, wind and thermal amplitudes, resulted in an interior relief forming a more gently appearing landscape, in comparison to the western areas of Ribeira Seca.

== Geography ==
The volcanic complex occupies the eastern part of the island and consists of basalt lavas, hawaiite and mugearite (aa) lavas, from explosive pyroclastic rocks and cinder cones originating from Strombolian eruptions.

Its features around the complex includes the Pico do Brejo do Cordeiro and several others.
