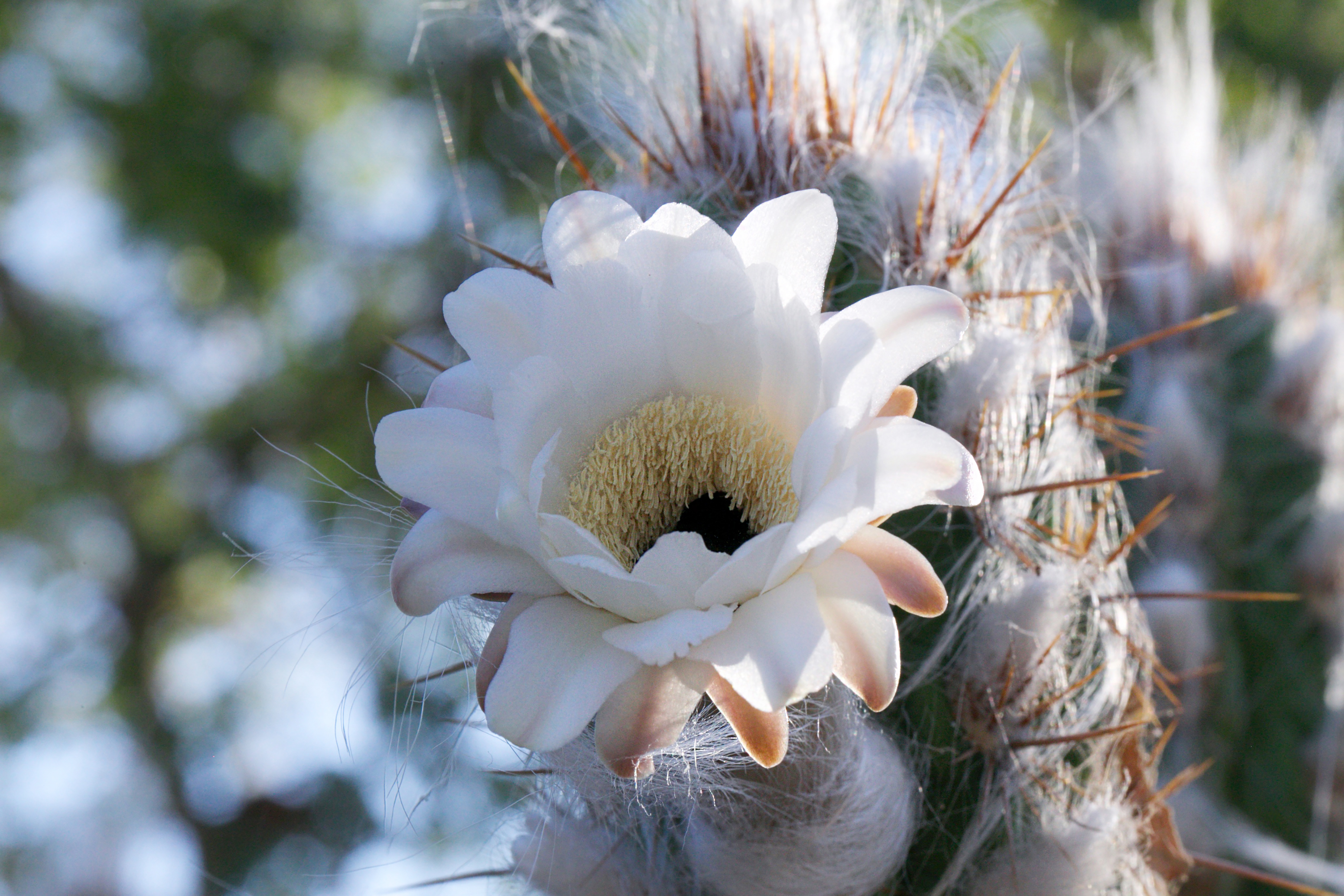
- Xiquexique gounellei

Scientific classification
- Kingdom: Plantae
- Clade: Tracheophytes
- Clade: Angiosperms
- Clade: Eudicots
- Order: Caryophyllales
- Family: Cactaceae
- Subfamily: Cactoideae
- Tribe: Cereeae
- Subtribe: Cereinae
- Genus: Xiquexique; Lavor, Calvente & Versieux 2020

Type species
- Xiquexique gounellei

Species
- See text.

Synonyms
- Caerulocereus Guiggi; Pilosocereus subg. Gounellea Zappi

= Xiquexique =

Genus of cactus

Xiquexique is genus of cactus from Brazil.

== Description ==
The genus Xiquexique comprises cacti that range from columnar to shrubby in shape. Their main stems grow upright, often with arched branches that run parallel to the ground. These stems typically have 4-15 ribs, and their fruits commonly display floral remnants that stand erect rather than being sunken into the apex of the pericarp. This morphological distinction from Pilosocereus is characterized by Xiquexique's candelabra-like branching stems, sinuated ribs, and the absence of sunken floral remnants on the fruit pericarp.

== Taxonomy ==
The genus Pilosocereus was divided into two subgenera in 1994 by Zappi, one of them being Pilosocereus subg. Gounellea based on its candelabra-like branching stems. In 2020, a phylogenetic analysis by Lavor, Calvente, and Versieux led to the elevation of the subgenus to its own genus, named Xiquexique. This new genus was named after the common name of Pilosocereus gounellei, which is known as xique-xique in Brazil.

=== Species ===
Species of the genus Xiquexique according to Plants of the World Online as of June 2025:

| Image | Scientific name | Distribution |
|---|---|---|
| | Xiquexique bohlei (Hofacker) N.P.Taylor | Brazil (Bahia) |
| | Xiquexique gounellei (F.A.C.Weber ex K.Schum.) Lavor & Calvente | Brazil |
| | Xiquexique tuberculatus (Werderm.) Lavor & Calvente | Brazil |

=== Natural hybrids ===
Natural hybrids of the genus Xiquexique according to Plants of the World Online as of August 2023:

| Image | Scientific name | Parentage | Distribution |
|---|---|---|---|
| | Xiquexique × heptagonus N.P.Taylor & Albuq.-Lima | Xiquexique gounellei × Xiquexique tuberculatus | Brazil (Pernambuco) |

== Distribution ==
Plants are found in the eastern region of Brazil, both in the north and the south.
