= Xique-Xique =

Xique-Xique Município de Xique-Xique
- Municipality
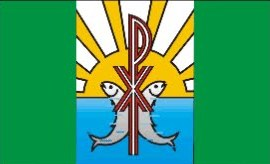
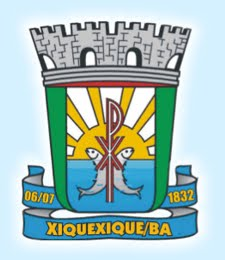
- Flag Coat of arms

- Xique-Xique in the state of Bahia

- Location in Brazil
- Coordinates: 10°49′49″S 42°43′51″W
- Country: Brazil
- Region: Nordeste
- State: Bahia
- Established: 1832

Government
  - Mayor: Alfredo Ricardo Bessa Magalhães (PT, 2013–2016)

Area
  - Total: 2,124 sq mi (5,502 km^{2})
- Elevation: 1,319 ft (402 m)

Population (2020)
  - Total: 46,523
  - Density: 22.7/sq mi (8.76/km^{2})
- Time zone: UTC−3 (BRT)

Xique-Xique (/ˌʃiːkiˈʃiːki/ SHEE-kee-SHEE-kee; Portuguese: [ˌʃi.kiˈʃi.ki]) is a municipality in the state of Bahia in the North-East region of Brazil. Its estimated population in 2020 was 46,523 inhabitants. It is situated on the right bank of São Francisco River and is a regional economic center. Xique-Xique takes its name from a cactus, Xiquexique gounellei, common to the region.

The first exploratory expedition to the region was in 1545, and carried out by the administration of Tomé de Souza (1503–1579), the first governor-general of the Portuguese colony of Brazil. A fazenda, or large-scale plantation, was established Cabo da Ipueira in the 17th century by the Portuguese Theobaldo Miranda Pires de Carvalho. Before ending the seventeenth century a gold-mining group called the Sierra Assuruá settled in Belvedere Island created the 1st core population inhabited by Europeans.

== See also ==
- List of municipalities in Bahia
