= Marcel (footballer, born August 1981) =

Brazilian footballer

Personal information
- Full name: Marcel Silva Andrade
- Date of birth: 10 August 1981 (age 45)
- Place of birth: São Vicente, São Paulo, Brazil
- Height: 1.82 m (6 ft 0 in)
- Position: Midfielder

Team information
- Current team: Resende

Senior career*
Years	Team	Apps	(Gls)
2000	São Vicente (SP)		
2001–2004	União Barbarense		
2004	Paraná	32	(8)
2005–2007	Palmeiras		
2005	→ Grêmio (loan)	1	(0)
2006	→ São Caetano (loan)	0	(0)
2006	→ Juventude (loan)		
2007	→ Náutico(loan)	7	(2)
2007	→ Paulista FC (loan)		
2008	Corinthians		
2009	Vila Nova(GO)	7	(0)
2010	Ituano	11	(0)
2011	Resende	22	(7)
- * Club domestic league appearances and goals

Marcel, full name Marcel Silva Andrade (born 10 August 1981) is a Brazilian footballer.

== Biography ==
=== Early career ===
Born in São Paulo state, Marcel started his career inside the state.

=== Palmeiras ===
In 2005 signed by Palmeiras in 3-year contract., which the club signed him from his agent Wagner Ribeiro through Iraty, a club operated by Wagner's friend. After played for Verdão in the state championship, he left for Rio Grande do Sul club Grêmio in June, winning 2005 Brazilian second level. In January 2006 he left for fellow São Paulo team São Caetano until the end of 2007 state league in April. Soon after, he returned to Rio Grande do Sul for Juventude in 2006 Brazilian first level. In January 2007 he left for Náutico in 1-year deal. In May 2007 he extended his contract with Palmeiras to 30 June 2008 and on 1 August left for Paulista FC for 2007 second level.

=== Corinthians ===
Corinthians signed Marcel in January 2008, which the club relegated after the withdrew of MSI, which at that time Corinthians held 60% economic rights on Marcel and 40% held by Desportivo Brasil (the subsidiary of Traffic Group), with Wagner remains as agent. He also re-joined former Grêmio coach Mano Menezes, winning 2008 Brazilian second level with Timão and returned to the top division.

=== Late career ===
In March 2009 he signed a 1-year (in fact 8 to 9 months) contract with Vila Nova of Goiás state, and played a few games in 2009 second division. He was released in July.

In December 2009 he signed a contract until the end of 2010 São Paulo state championship, which he played a few games. In December 2010 he left for Resende, played as a regular at 2011 Rio de Janeiro state championship, scored 4 goals.

== Honours ==
- Brazilian Série B: 2005 (Grêmio) and 2008 ( Corinthians)
- Troféu Washington Rodrigues: 2011 (Resende)
