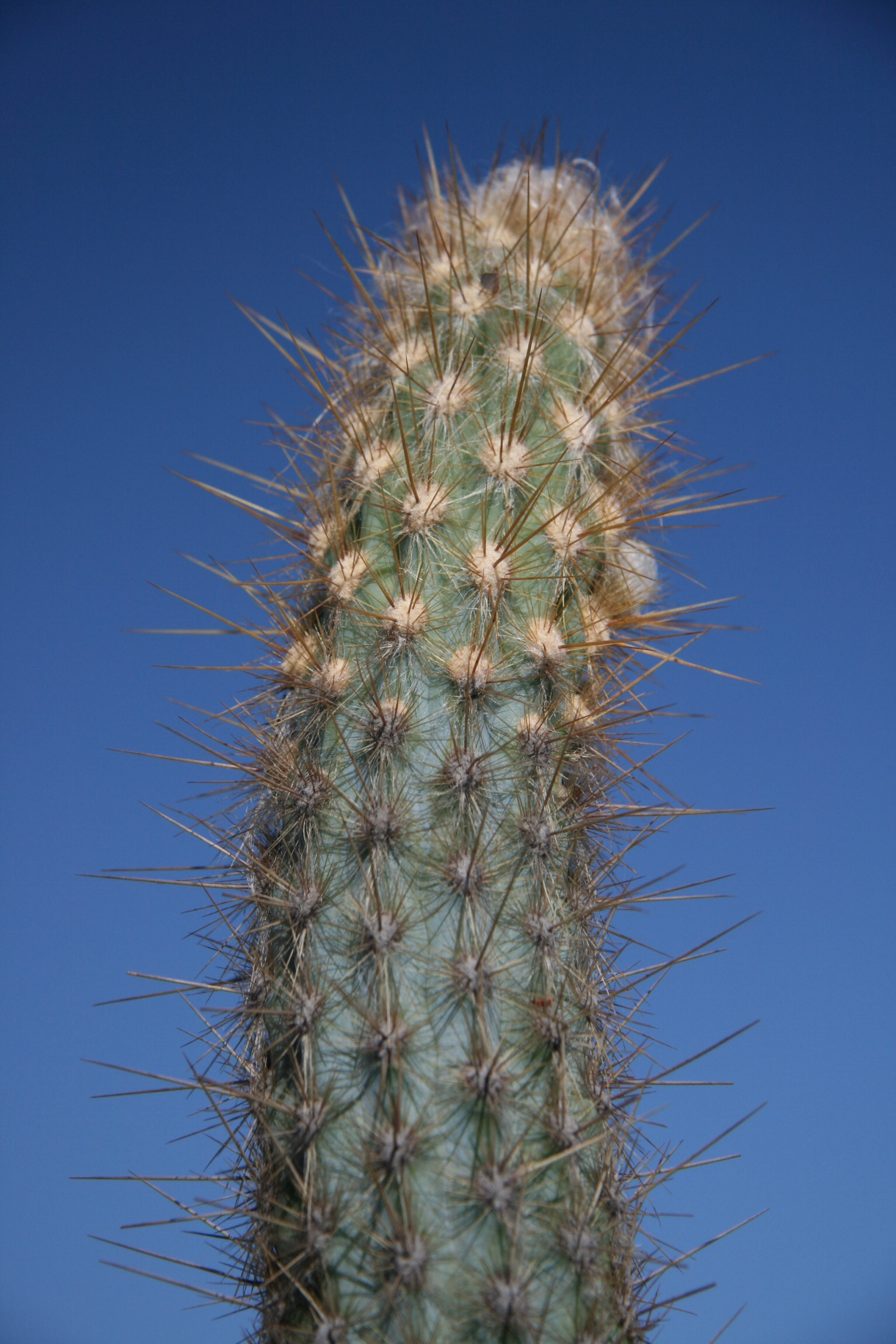

Conservation status
- Least Concern (IUCN 3.1)

Scientific classification
- Kingdom: Plantae
- Clade: Tracheophytes
- Clade: Angiosperms
- Clade: Eudicots
- Order: Caryophyllales
- Family: Cactaceae
- Subfamily: Cactoideae
- Genus: Xiquexique
- Species: X. bohlei

Binomial name
- Xiquexique bohlei Hofacker) N.P.Taylor

Synonyms
- Caerulocereus bohlei (Hofacker) Guiggi; Pilosocereus bohlei Hofacker

= Xiquexique bohlei =

Species of cactus

Xiquexique bohlei, synonym Pilosocereus bohlei, is a species of cactus found in Bahia, Brazil.

== Description ==
Xiquexique bohlei is a shrubby columnar cactus that branches only at its base, growing to a height of up to 1.8 meters. Its upright to arching shoots are light bluish to blue-green, have a diameter of up to 12 centimeters, and are club-shaped with a thickened base. The cactus features 9 to 12 ribs, each with slightly raised oval areoles that produce several hairs up to 3 centimeters long. The spines are initially reddish or light brown but later change to yellowish or a gray-black color. There is typically one central spine, measuring up to 2.5 centimeters, which is hard to distinguish from the 30 to 40 radial spines that are up to 20 millimeters long. A distinct flowering section emerges from the shoots, featuring up to 7 ribs and extending up to 40 centimeters in length, with white hairs up to 7 centimeters long in the flowering areoles.

The cactus produces slightly curved, funnel-shaped white flowers that are light green on the outside. These flowers can be up to 5.5 centimeters long and have a diameter of up to 3.5 centimeters. Its greenish to bluish-green, depressed, spherical fruits can reach lengths of up to 3.5 centimeters and diameters of up to 4 centimeters, containing white pulp inside.

== Taxonomy ==
The species was first described as Pilosocereus bohlei in 2001 by Andreas Hofacker. Its specific epithet, bohlei, honors the German cactus enthusiast and co-discoverer, Bernhard Bohle. It was transferred to the genus Xiquexique in 2023.

== Distribution ==
Xiquexique bohlei is commonly found in the northeastern Brazilian state of Bahia.

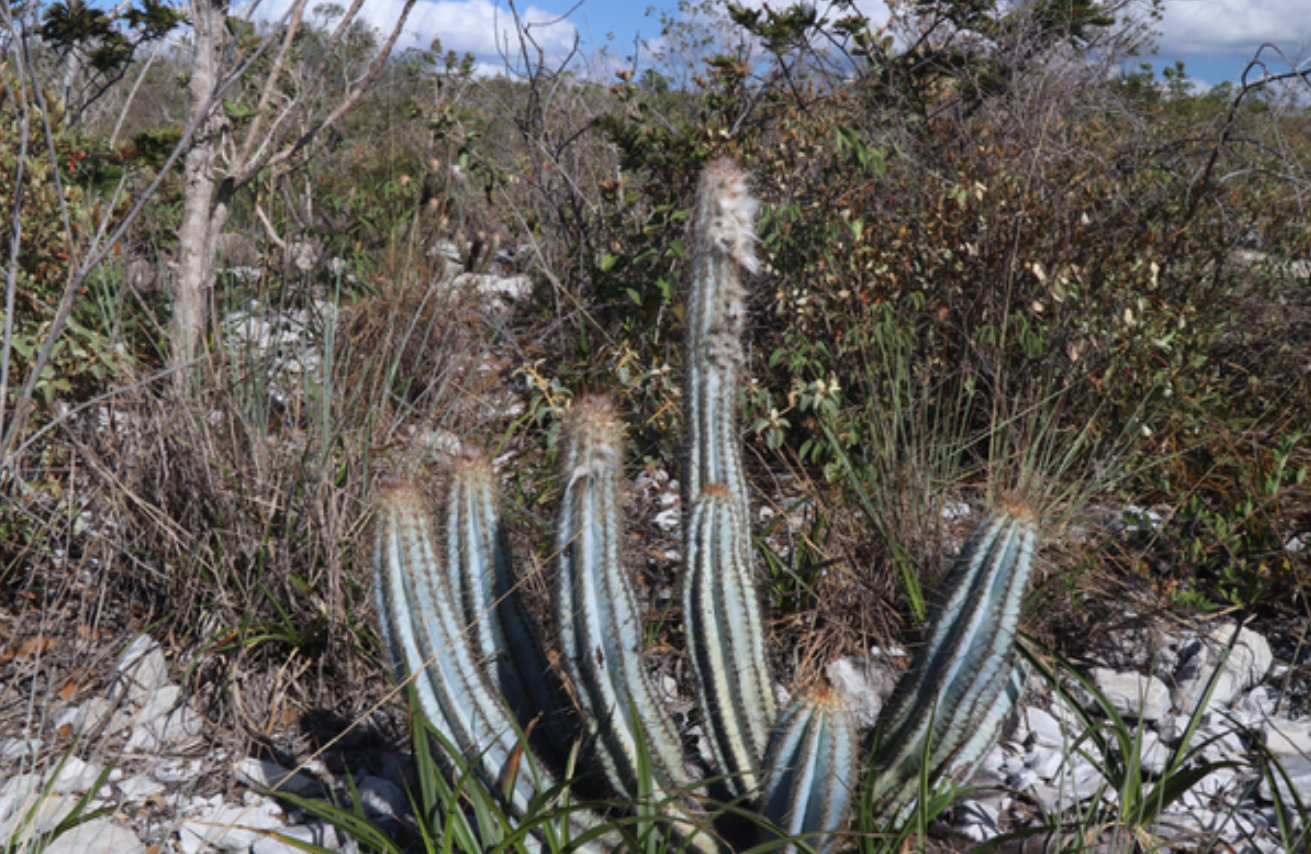
Growing in habitat in Bahia, Brazil
