= Pico do Brejo do Cordeiro =

Mountain in the Azores, Portugal

Pico do Brejo do Cordeiro is a peak on the island of São Jorge in the Azores.

It is located around the area of Norte Pequeno and is closely related with a peak mountain in the centre of the island. Its elevation is 739 m above sea level and is made up of a pluvial escarpment by the sea. Its geological formations are volcanic and pyroclastic in origin and are very old.

== See also ==
- Topo Volcanic Complex
- Rosais Volcanic Complex
- Manadas Volcanic Complex
