= Saulo (footballer, born 1979) =

Brazilian footballer

Personal information
- Full name: Saulo Batista de Andrade Cordeiro
- Date of birth: 19 November 1979 (age 46)
- Place of birth: Recife, Brazil
- Height: 1.82 m (5 ft 11 1/2 in)
- Position: Midfielder

Youth career
- CRB

Senior career*
Years	Team	Apps	(Gls)
2002	CRB		
2002–2005	Criciúma	57	(2)
2007	Treze		
2007	Gama		
2008	América-RN	?	(5)
2009	Itumbiara		
2009	Fortaleza	20	(0)
2010	América-RN	23	(0)
2011	União São João	5	(1)
2011	Marília	0	(0)
2011	CRB	1	(0)
2012	Juventus-SP	19	(3)
2013	Goianésia	12	(0)
- * Club domestic league appearances and goals

Saulo Batista de Andrade Cordeiro (born 19 November 1979), simply known as Saulo, is a retired Brazilian footballer who played as a midfielder.

== Honours ==
CRB

- Campeonato Alagoano: 2002

Criciúma

- Campeonato Catarinense: 2005
