= Edinho (footballer, born 1979) =

Brazilian footballer

Personal information
- Full name: Edison Carlos Felicíssimo Polidório
- Date of birth: 30 October 1979 (age 47)
- Place of birth: Paraíba do Sul, Brazil
- Height: 1.75 m (5 ft 9 in)
- Position: Left back

Senior career*
Years	Team	Apps	(Gls)
1998–2000	Madureira		
2000	Cherno More		
2001–2003	Vasco da Gama	34	(0)
2004	Madureira		
2004–2006	Paraná	24	(0)
2007	Náutico		
2007	Vitória		
2008	Iraklis		
2008–2011	Brasiliense	46	(2)
2010–2011	→ Novo Hamburgo (loan)		
2012	Arapongas		
2013–2014	Luverdense	37	(1)
2015	Maringá		
- * Club domestic league appearances and goals as of 20 January 2017

Edison Carlos Felícissimo Polidório (born October 30, 1979, in Paraíba do Sul), known as Edinho, is a Brazilian footballer who plays as a left back. His most recent club was Maringá.

== Career statistics ==
As of 24 January 2017

Club	Season	League			State League		Cup		Conmebol		Other		Total	
Club	Season	Division	Apps	Goals	Apps	Goals	Apps	Goals	Apps	Goals	Apps	Goals	Apps	Goals
Brasiliense	2009	Série B	33	1	19	2	—		—		—		52	3
Brasiliense	2010	Série B	1	0	18	3	2	0	—		—		21	3
Brasiliense	2011	Série C	12	1	—		—		—		—		12	1
Brasiliense	Subtotal		46	2	37	5	2	0	—		—		85	7
Novo Hamburgo	2011	Gaúcho	—		6	0	—		—		—		6	0
Arapongas	2012	Paranaense	—		18	1	—		—		—		18	1
Luverdense	2013	Série C	21	1	18	1	8	0	—		—		47	2
Luverdense	2014	Série C	16	0	12	0	—		—		—		28	0
Luverdense	Subtotal		37	1	30	1	8	0	—		—		75	2
Maringá	2015	Paranaense	—		11	1	4	0	—		—		15	1
Career total			83	3	102	8	14	0	0	0	0	0	199	11

== Honours ==
=== Club ===
Vasco

- Campeonato Carioca: 2003
