= Beto (footballer, born 1980) =

Brazilian footballer

Personal information
- Full name: Cícero Herbete de Oliveira Melo
- Date of birth: September 3, 1980 (age 46)
- Place of birth: Itaporanga, Brazil
- Height: 1.66 m (5 ft 5 1/2 in)
- Position: Striker

Youth career
- 1999–2001: Auto Esporte

Senior career*
Years	Team	Apps	(Gls)
2002–2003	Campinense	-	(-)
2004	Vitória	-	(-)
2004–2010	Treze	18	(10)
2005–2006	→ Fluminense (loan)	36	(6)
2007	→ Náutico (loan)	4	(0)
2007	→ São Caetano (loan)	-	(-)
2008	→ Atlético Mineiro (loan)	7	(1)
2008	→ Criciúma (loan)	-	(-)
2009	→ Bahia (loan)	20	(3)
2010	→ Brasiliense (loan)	3	(1)
2010	→ Ipatinga (loan)	6	(0)
2011	Central	-	(-)
2011	Salgueiro	3	(0)
- * Club domestic league appearances and goals

Cícero Herbete de Oliveira Melo, commonly known as Beto (born September 3, 1980 in Itaporanga), is a Brazilian association football striker. He is currently retired from football.

Beto has previously played for Fluminense in the Campeonato Brasileiro.
