= Santa Luzia, Paraíba =

Santa Luzia
- Municipality
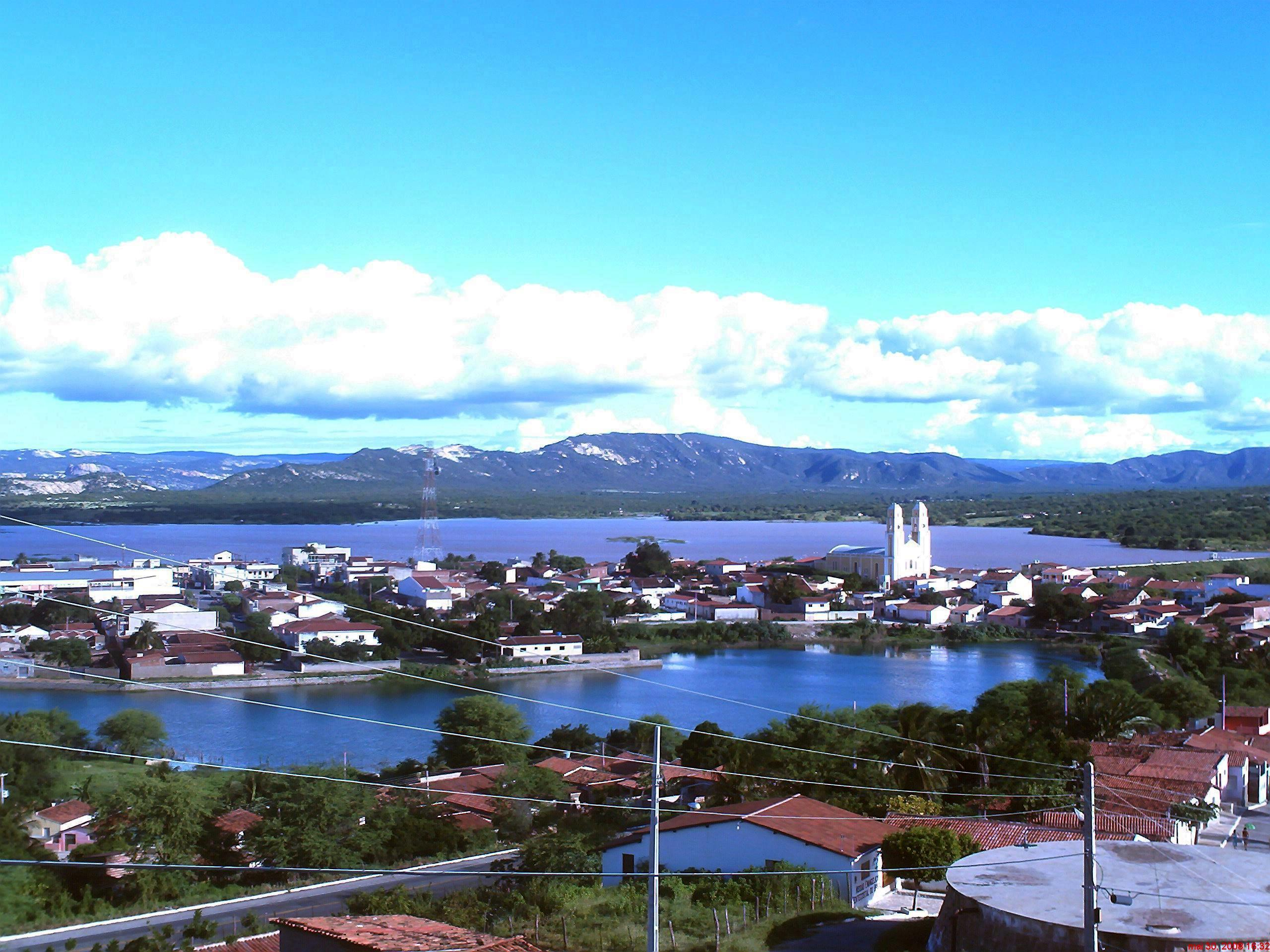

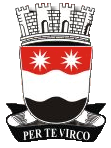
- Flag Coat of arms

- Location in Brazil
- Coordinates: 6°52′19″S 36°55′8″W
- Country: Brazil
- Region: Northeast
- State: Paraíba
- Mesoregion: Boborema

Government
  - Mayor: José Alexandre de Araújo (Zezé) MDB

Population (2020)
  - Total: 15,426
- Time zone: UTC−3 (BRT)

Santa Luzia (Central northeastern portuguese pronunciation: [ˈsɐ̃tɐ luˈzjɐ]) is a municipality in the state of Paraíba in the Northeast Region of Brazil.

== See also ==
- List of municipalities in Paraíba
