= Cris (footballer, born 1979) =

Brazilian footballer

Personal information
- Full name: Cristiano Lima da Silva
- Date of birth: 1 October 1979 (age 47)
- Place of birth: Osasco, Brazil
- Height: 1.92 m (6 ft 3 1/2 in)
- Position: Defender

Team information
- Current team: Catanduvense

Senior career*
Years	Team	Apps	(Gls)
2000–2003	Palmeiras		
2004	União São João		
2004	América–SP		
2005	Oeste		
2006–2007	Bragantino		
2007	Náutico		
2007	América–RN		
2008–2009	Bragantino		
2009	Brasiliense		
2009	Santo André		
2010	Oeste		
2010	Criciúma		
2010	Vila Nova		
2011–2012	Oeste		
2011	→ Paraná (loan)		
2012	Bragantino		
2012	Aluminium Hormozgan		
2013	Botafogo–SP		
2014	Rio Branco–PR		
2014	Oeste		
2015	Guarani		
2017–	Catanduvense		
- * Club domestic league appearances and goals as of 11 February 2017

Cristiano Lima da Silva (born January 10, 1979, in Osasco), known as Cris, is a Brazilian footballer who plays for Catanduvense as defender.

== Career statistics ==
As of 11 February 2017

Club	Season	League			State League		Cup		Conmebol		Other		Total	
Club	Season	Division	Apps	Goals	Apps	Goals	Apps	Goals	Apps	Goals	Apps	Goals	Apps	Goals
Náutico	2007	Série A	6	1	—		—		—		—		6	1
América–RN	2007	Série A	8	0	—		—		—		—		8	0
Bragantino	2009	Série B	—		10	2	—		—		—		10	2
Brasiliense	2009	Série B	11	1	—		—		—		—		11	1
Santo André	2009	Série A	6	0	—		—		—		—		6	0
Oeste	2010	Série D	—		14	0	—		—		—		14	0
Vila Nova	2010	Série B	18	1	—		—		—		—		18	1
Oeste	2011	Série D	—		19	0	—		—		—		19	0
Oeste	2012	Série C	—		7	0	—		—		—		7	0
Oeste	Subtotal		—		26	0	—		—		—		26	0
Paraná	2011	Série B	20	0	—		—		—		—		20	0
Bragantino	2012	Série B	4	0	—		—		—		—		4	0
Aluminium Hormozgan	2012–2013	Pro League	6	0	—		—		—		—		6	0
Botafogo–SP	2013	Série D	—		12	2	—		—		—		12	2
Rio Branco–PR	2014	Paranaense	—		10	1	—		—		—		10	1
Oeste	2014	Série B	18	0	—		—		—		—		18	0
Guarani	2015	Série C	—		10	0	—		—		—		10	0
Catanduvense	2017	Paulista A3	—		1	0	—		—		—		1	0
Career total			97	3	83	5	0	0	0	0	0	0	180	8

== Career ==
Since	Club	Contracts
Feb 2010	Vila Nova ( Brazil )	No professional contracts entered
Oct 2009	Oeste ( Brazil )	No professional contracts entered
Oct 2009	Santo André ( Brazil )	No professional contracts entered
