= Juazeirinho =

Coordinates: 7.06778°S 36.5778°W

- Municipality
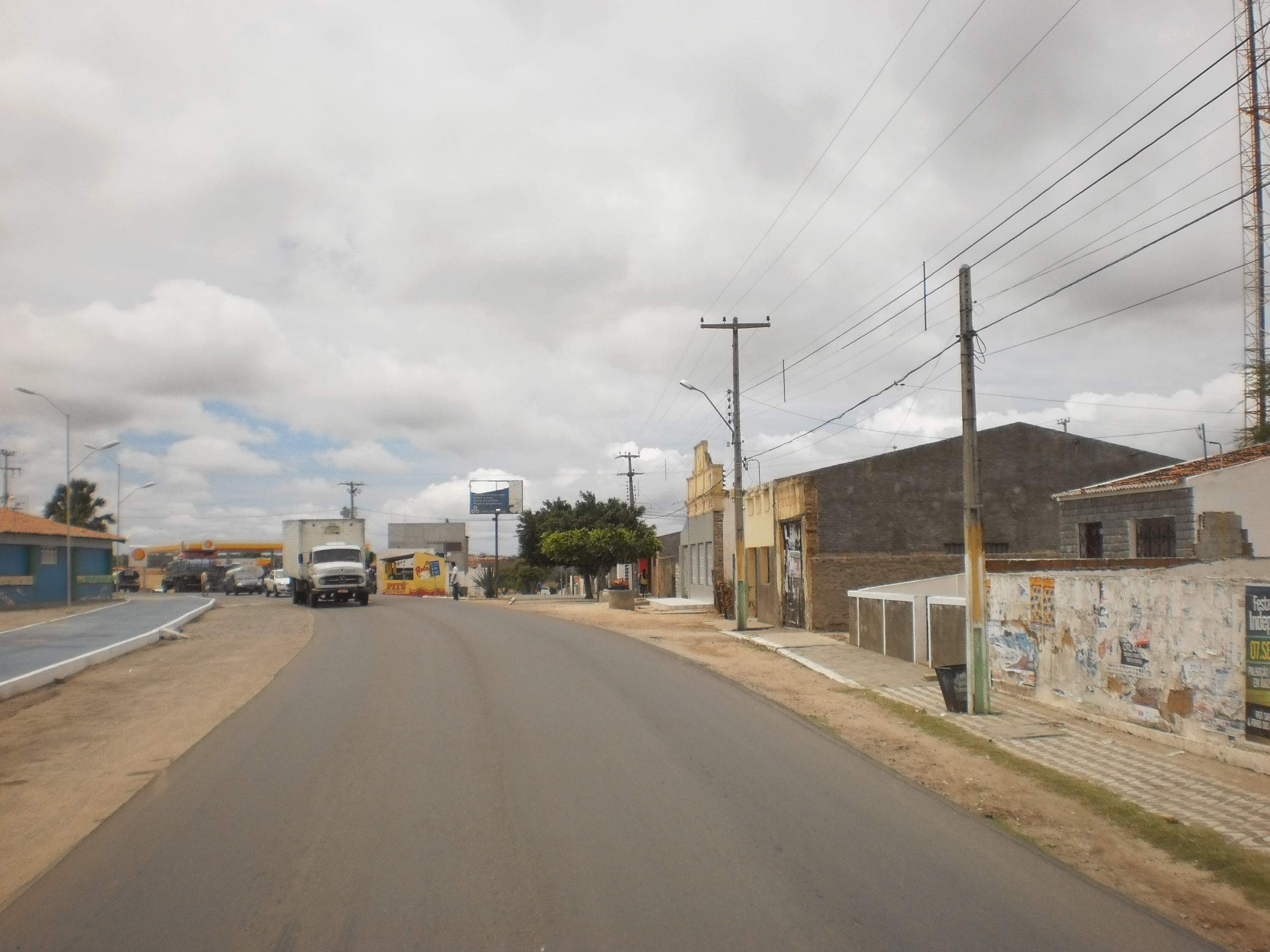

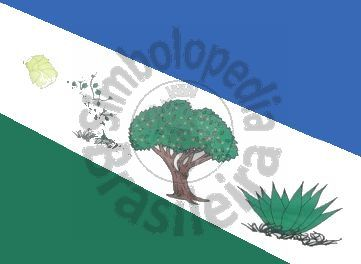
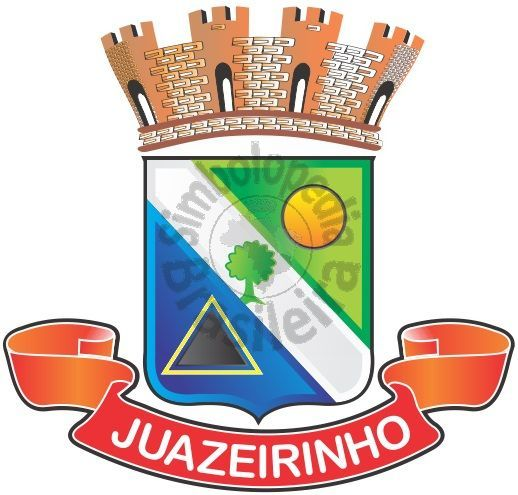
- Flag Coat of arms

- Country: Brazil
- Region: South
- State: Paraíba
- Mesoregion: Boborema

Population (2020)
  - Total: 18,298
- Time zone: UTC−3 (BRT)

Juazeirinho is a municipality in the state of Paraíba in the Northeast Region of Brazil.

== See also ==
- List of municipalities in Paraíba
