= Flávio (footballer, born April 1975) =

Brazilian footballer

Personal information
- Full name: Flávio Elias Cordeiro
- Date of birth: April 23, 1975 (age 51)
- Place of birth: Brazil
- Height: 1.88 m (6 ft 2 in)
- Position: Striker

Senior career*
| Years | Team | Apps | (Gls) |
| 2006 | Shonan Bellmare | | |
- * Club domestic league appearances and goals

Flávio Elias Cordeiro (born April 23, 1975), known as just Flávio, is a Brazilian football player.

== Club statistics ==
| Club performance | | | League | | Cup | | Total | |
| Season | Club | League | Apps | Goals | Apps | Goals | Apps | Goals |
| Japan | | | League | | Emperor's Cup | | Total | |
|---|---|---|---|---|---|---|---|---|
| 2006 | Shonan Bellmare | J2 League | 11 | 1 | 2 | 0 | 13 | 1 |
| Country | Japan | | 11 | 1 | 2 | 0 | 13 | 1 |
| Total | | | 11 | 1 | 2 | 0 | 13 | 1 |
