= Manuel Cordeiro =

Portuguese football manager (born 1983)

Personal information
- Full name: Manuel Júlio Cordeiro da Silva Pereira
- Date of birth: 26 August 1983 (age 43)
- Place of birth: Faro, Portugal

Managerial career
- Years: Team
- 2005–2010: Vitória Setúbal
- 2010–2012: Belenenses
- 2012–2013: Videoton
- 2013–2014: Maccabi Tel Aviv
- 2014–2015: Basel
- 2015–2018: Fiorentina
- 2019–2020: Bordeaux (assistant)
- 2021: Poland (assistant)
- 2022: Flamengo (assistant)

Manuel Júlio Cordeiro da Silva Pereira (born 26 August 1983) is a Portuguese football manager. He is the current assistant manager of Italian club Salernitana.

== Biography ==
Since the beginning of his career as football manager Manuel Cordeiro stood out by the relevance that he gave to the training methods and game analysis, follow the line of thought of Professor Jorge Castelo, his reference in the football world.

In 2002 started his graduation in Sports Science, Sports Training / Football Specialized at Faculdade de Motricidade Humana, with the final work in Game Analysis - “Offensive process characterization of high performance team - case study” with Professor Jorge Castelo and José Mourinho (during the Chelsea season) as mentors achieving the final score of 18 values.

During the 2004–05 season started his first job as assistant coach at Grupo Desportivo Banco de Portugal and the followed season pass to assistant coach at U19 Vitória de Setúbal. Between 2005–06 and 2009–10 seasons Manuel continue in Vitória de Setúbal working with U11 and U12 as head coach (twice 2nd at Regional Championship) and as U19 assistant coach achieving the 4th place at Nacional Championship. During this seasons he create and develop an analysis and scouting department of the Vitória F.C.

In 2010–11 Manuel Cordeiro was invited to work in the youth of “Os Belenenses” Football Club as manager of U14 Team which played the U15 league of Lisbon Football Association, reaching the 10th place. The following season, he start working as assistant coach of U19 Team with Professor Jorge Castelo. When Castelo leaves the club to be part of Sporting Clube de Portugal Technical Team, Manuel accept to be in charge of U19 Team “Os Belenenses” as head coach leading the team to the 5th place of National Championship.

At the end of the season Manuel was invited to be Ferenc Puskás Football Academy Coordinator (Hungarian Club Videton Academy), position he occupied during the 2012/2013 season. When Manuel arrived Puskas Academy, the manager Paulo Sousa invite him to work as analyst for the Videoton FC during the UEFA Europa League, thus Manuel was part of the team who achieve the best position of the club in this European Competition, where they reached the Group Stage scoring two wins (Sporting Clube de Portugal and Basel FC)

At the beginning of 2013, the manager Paulo Sousa leaves the club and Manuel Cordeiro accept the challenged to be assistant manager until new manager José Gomes arrive. Then Manuel assume the leadership of the Videoton B team reaching the 4th place of the second Hungarian League.

After a season at Videoton where he could prove his value as a coach and as game analyst, Paulo Sousa invite Manuel Cordeiro to be part of his new project Maccabi Tel Aviv Football Club, the winner of 2012–13 National Championship.

In the summer of 2015, he followed Paulo Sousa to Fiorentina.

== Career ==
=== Head coach ===
- 2012–13 - Videoton B (4th place - 2nd Hungarian League)
- 2011–12 - U19 “Os Belenenses” (5th place National Championship).
- 2010–11 - U14 “Os Belenenses” (5th place U15 Regional Championship).
- 2009–10 - U10 Vitória de Setúbal (Regional Champion)
- 2008–09 - U11 Vitória de Setúbal (Regional Champion)
- 2007–08 - U10 Vitória de Setúbal (2nd place Regional Championship)

=== Coordinator ===
- 2012–13 - Coordinator at Ferenc Puskas Academy (Videoton FC Academy)

=== Assistant coach ===
- 2012–13 - Videoton FC (2nd place Hungarian League and Group Stage at Europe League with 2 wins (Sporting Clube de Portugal e Basel FC)).
- 2009–10 - U19 Vitória de Setúbal (4th place National Championship).
- 2008–09 - U19 Vitória de Setúbal (4th place National Championship).
- 2006–07 - U15 Vitória de Setúbal (5th place National Championship).
- 2005–06 - U19 Vitória de Setúbal (6th place National Championship).
- 2004–05 - Senior Team of Grupo Desportivo Banco de Portugal (6th place - INATEL Championship).

== Studies ==
- UEFA Basic License – UEFA B Portuguese Football Federation - Setúbal Football Association with final classification of 16,31 values in 2007.
- Post-graduation in High-performance Sports Training / Football Specialized at Universidade Lusófona de Humanidades e Tecnologias in 2011/2012.
- Monography in Game Analysis - “Offensive process characterization of high performance team - case study” with Professor Jorge Castelo and José Mourinho (during the Chelsea season) as mentors achieving the final score of 18 values.
- Graduation in Sports Sciences - Sports Training / Football Specialized at Faculdade de Motricidade Humana, with final classification of 15 values.

== Stages ==
- Analyst and Observation Stage with Professional Team Atlético Clube de Portugal (1st place) in 2011 (coach João de Deus.
- Analyst and Observation Stage with Professional Team Vitória Futebol Clube (5th place) in 2007 (coach Carlos Carvalhal).
- Analyst and Observation Stage with Professional Team Vitória Futebol Clube (6th place) in 2004 (coach José Couceiro).
