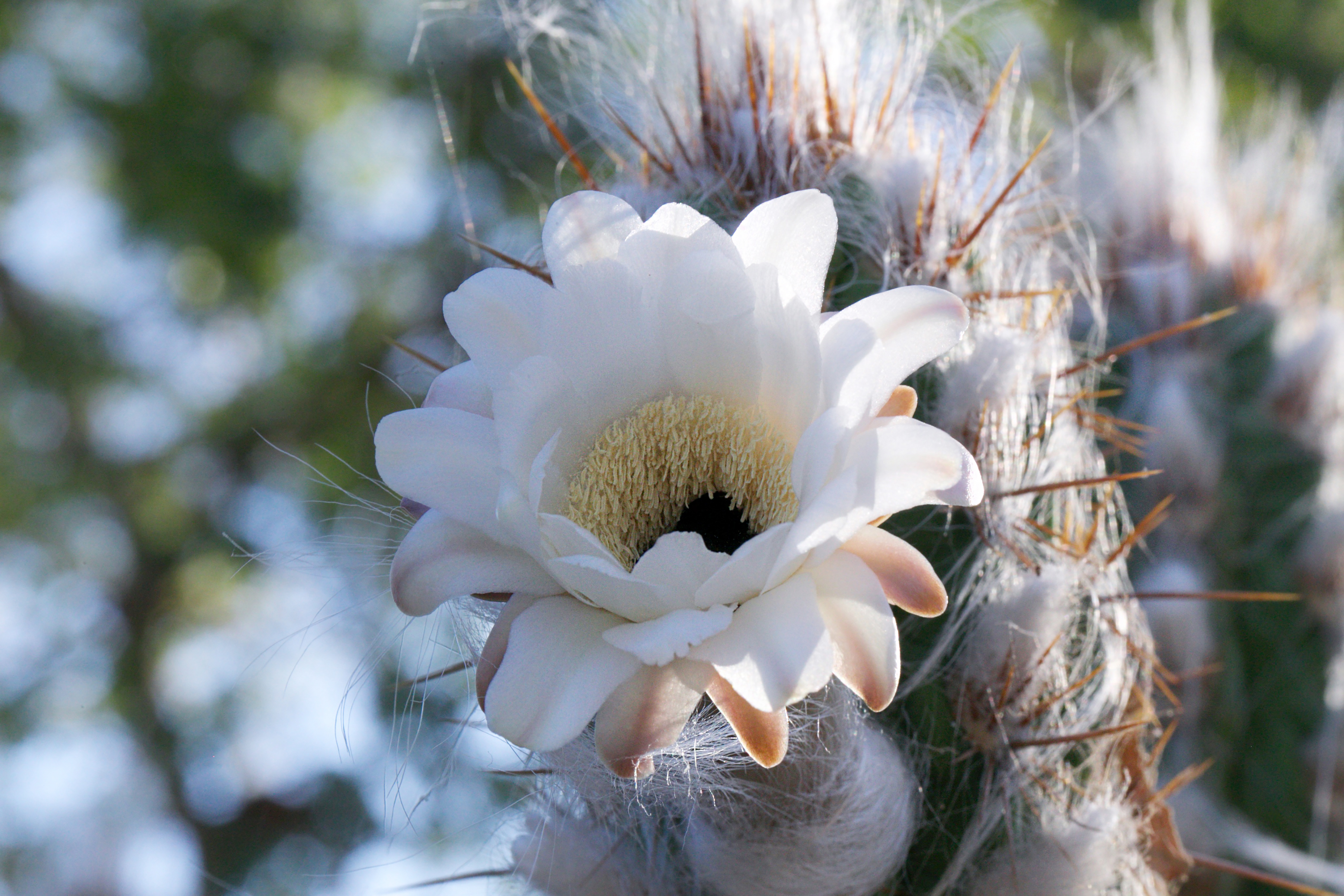

Conservation status
- Least Concern (IUCN 3.1)

Scientific classification
- Kingdom: Plantae
- Clade: Tracheophytes
- Clade: Angiosperms
- Clade: Eudicots
- Order: Caryophyllales
- Family: Cactaceae
- Subfamily: Cactoideae
- Genus: Xiquexique
- Species: X. gounellei

Binomial name
- Xiquexique gounellei (F.A.C.Weber ex K.Schum.) Lavor & Calvente

Subspecies
- See text.

Synonyms
- Cephalocereus gounellei (F.A.C.Weber ex K.Schum.) Britton & Rose; Cereus gounellei (F.A.C.Weber ex K.Schum.) Luetzelb.; Pilocereus gounellei F.A.C.Weber ex K.Schum.; Pilosocereus gounellei (F.A.C.Weber ex K.Schum.) Byles & G.D.Rowley; Pseudopilocereus gounellei (F.A.C.Weber ex K.Schum.) Buxb.

= Xiquexique gounellei =

Species of cactus

Xiquexique gounellei is a species of plant in the genus Xiquexique of the cactus family. Spanish common names include alastrado, chique-chique, xique-xique and xique-xique das Pedras.

== Description ==
Xiquexique gounellei grows as a shrub and rarely as a tree, branches out numerously from a trunk and reaches heights of growth of 0.5 to 4 meters. The upright shoots become crooked or even horizontal with age. They are olive green, sometimes glaucous, and range from 3.7 to 9 centimeters in diameter. Young shoots appear near the top of the main shoot. There are 8 to 15 ribs with transverse ridges. The opaque to translucent spines are golden to reddish or brown or gray. The 1 to 10 ascending to protruding central spines are 1 to 13 centimeters (rarely up to 16 centimeters) long. The spread 10 to 20 radial spines lie on the surface of the shoots and are 6 to 30 millimeters long. The flowering part of the shoots is weak to strong and is located near the tip of the shoot. The flower buds are completely surrounded by long, silky hairs.

The funnel-shaped white flowers are 4 to 9 centimeters long and reach a diameter of 2.5 to 6 centimeters. The spherical to depressed spherical fruits are 4.5 to 6 centimeters in diameter, fissure at their base or near the apex, and contain magenta or white flesh.

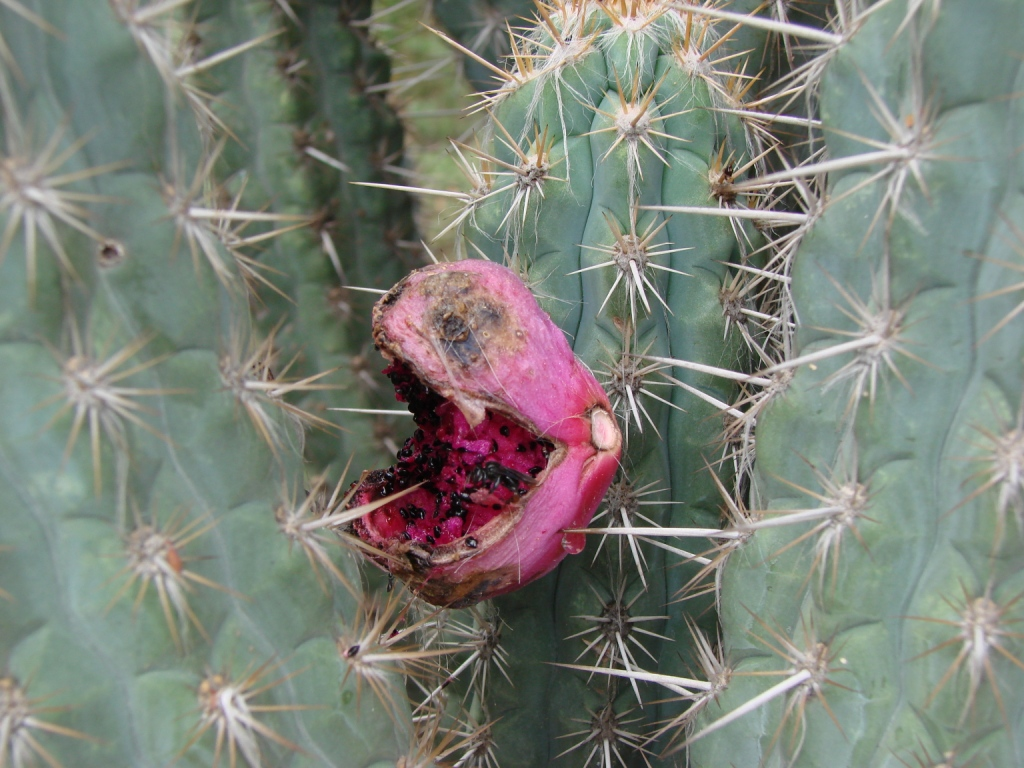
Fruit

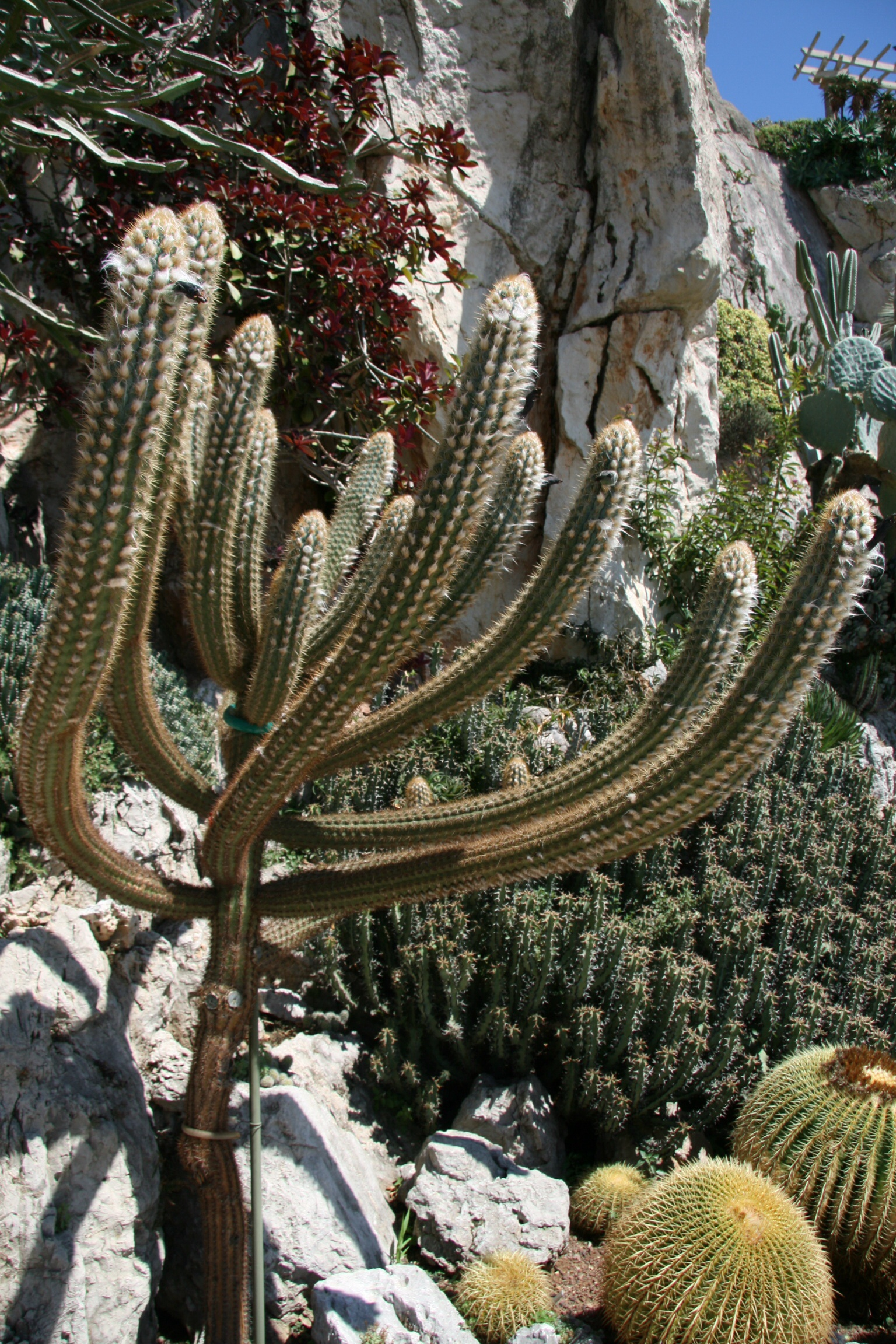
Plant

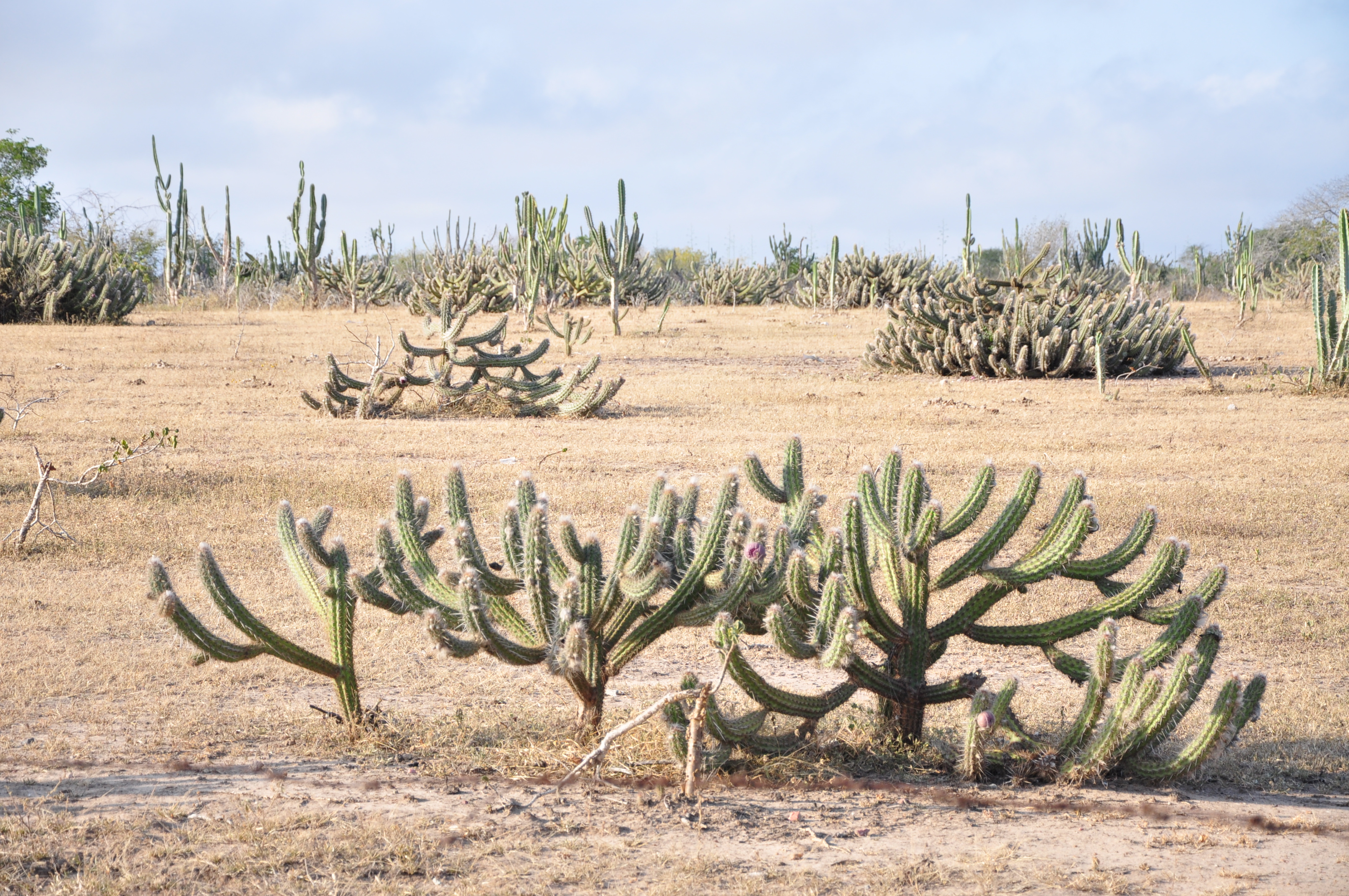
In habitat in the interior of Bahia

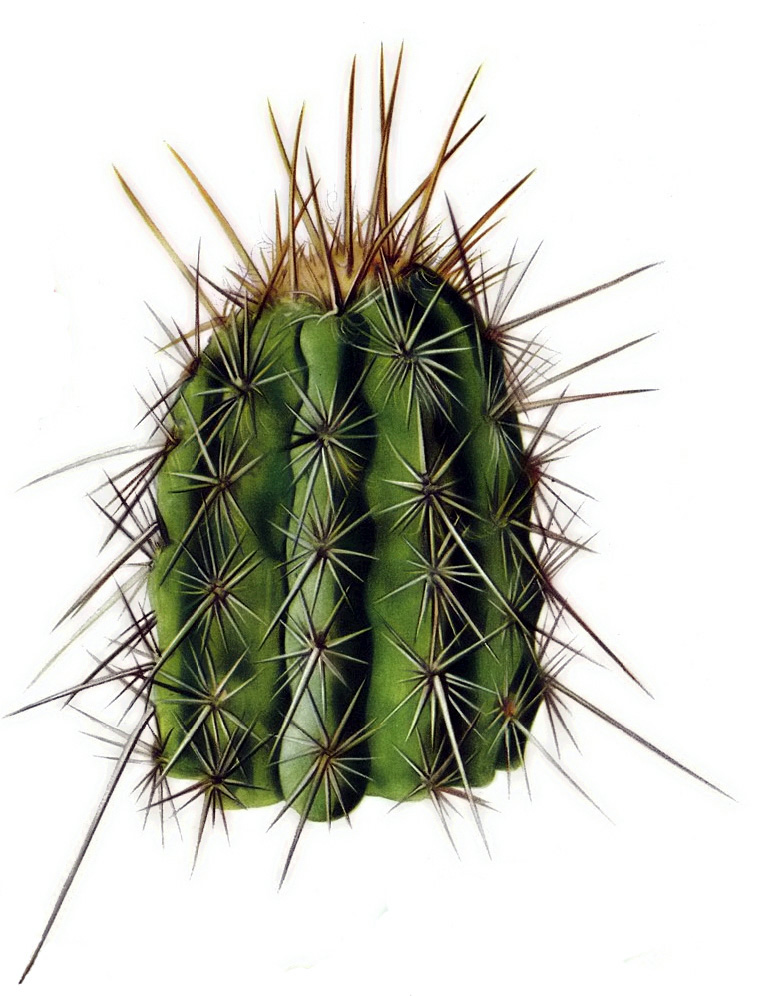
Illustration by Mary Emily Eaton in The Cactaceae Vol II

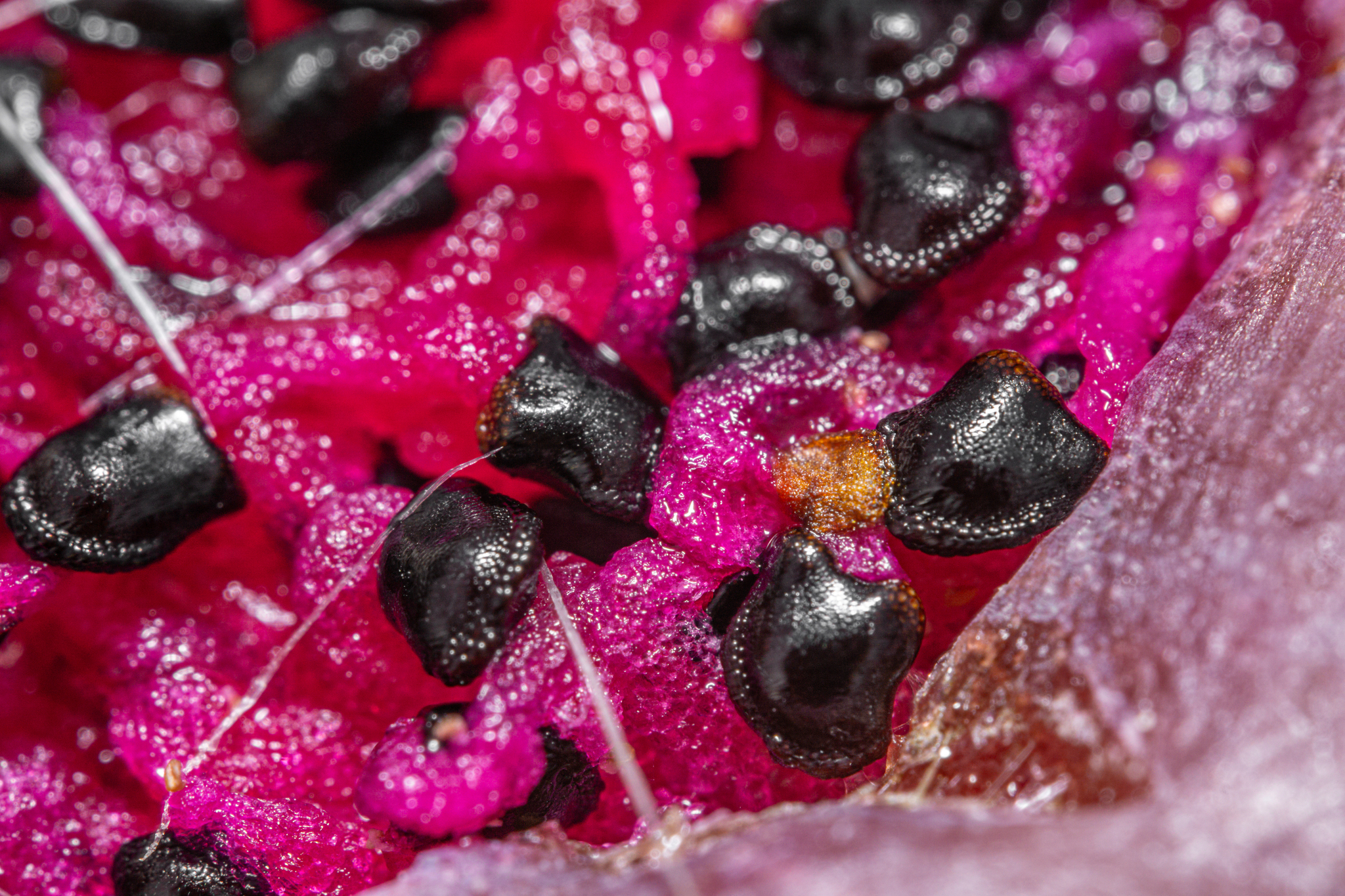
Seeds

== Taxonomy ==
The first description as Pilocereus gounellei was published in 1897 by Frédéric Albert Constantin Weber. The specific epithet gounellei honors the French entomologist Pierre-Émile Gounelle (1850–1914). Pâmela Lavor and Alice Calvente placed the species in the genus Xiquexique in 2020. Other nomenclature synonyms are Cephalocereus gounellei (F.A.C.Weber) Britton & Rose, Cereus gounellei (F.A.C.Weber) Luetzelb. , Pilosocereus gounellei (F.A.C. Weber) Byles & G.D.Rowley and Pseudopilocereus gounellei (F.A.C.Weber) Buxb.

=== Subspecies ===
As of June 2025, Plants of the World Online accepted four subspecies:

- Xiquexique gounellei subsp. braunii (Esteves) N.P.Taylor & Zappi, syns. Pilosocereus braunii Esteves, Xiquexique braunii (Esteves) M.Köhler – Bahia, Brazil
- Xiquexique gounellei subsp. frewenii (Zappi & N.P.Taylor) Guiggi, syns.Pilosocereus frewenii Zappi & N.P.Taylor, Xiquexique frewenii (Zappi & N.P.Taylor) Lavor & Calvente – Minas Gerais, Brazil
- Xiquexique gounellei subsp. gounellei, syn. Pilocereus setosus Gürke – eastern Brazil
- Xiquexique gounellei subsp. zehntneri (Britton & Rose) Lavor & Calvente, many synonyms including Pilosocereus zehntneri (Britton & Rose) F.Ritter, Xiquexique zehntneri (Britton & Rose) Lodé – eastern Brazil

== Distribution and habitat ==
Xiquexique gounellei is widespread in eastern Brazil, growing in seasonally dry habitats.

The species is classified as Least Concern (LC) in the IUCN Red List of Threatened Species.

== Uses ==
The fruits are edible, and it is said that Caffeine can be found in the stems.
