= Sidny (footballer) =

Brazilian footballer (born 1981)

Personal information
- Full name: Sidny Feitosa dos Santos
- Date of birth: 21 July 1981 (age 45)
- Place of birth: Xique-Xique, Brazil
- Height: 1.70 m (5 ft 7 in)
- Position: Right wing-back

Senior career*
Years	Team	Apps	(Gls)
2005	Vitória (PE)	0	(0)
2005	Serrano (PE)		
2006–2007	Salgueiro	0	(0)
2006–2007	→ Náutico (loan)		
2008–2009	Livorno	2	(0)
2008–2009	→ Sport (loan)	15	(0)
2009	→ Náutico (loan)	10	(0)
2010	Brasiliense	3	(0)
2011	Paysandu	12	(0)
2012	Comercial (RP)	0	(0)
2012	ASA	3	(0)
2013–2015	Salgueiro	0	(0)
- * Club domestic league appearances and goals as of 30 December 2025

Sidny Feitosa dos Santos (born 21 July 1981 in Xique-Xique) is a former Brazilian footballer who last played for Salgueiro.

== Biography ==
=== Pernambucano minor clubs ===
Born in Xique-Xique, Bahia, Sidny was signed by Vitória de Santo Antão in January 2005 until the end of 2005 Campeonato Pernambucano. In July 2005 he was signed by Serrano in 1-year deal. He played in the 2005 Campeonato Brasileiro Série C. In December 2005 he signed a 1-year deal with Salgueiro, also located in Pernambuco. Sidny was a player of the team in 2006 Campeonato Pernambucano.

=== Náutico & Livorno ===
Sidny was signed by Náutico in mid-2006, one of the major club in that state in temporary deal, where the team became his stepping stone. He finished as the third in 2006 Campeonato Brasileiro Série B and promoted to the top division of Brazil. In January 2007 the temporary deal between Náutico and Salgueiro was renewed as well as Sidny's contract with Salgueiro. In January 2008 Sidny was sold to Italian Serie A club Livorno. However he only able to play 2 games. In July 2008 Sidny returned to Brazil for Sport in 1-year temporary deal. In March 2009 Sidny terminated the contract and returned to Náutico until the end of 2009 Campeonato Brasileiro Série A. Náutico did not renew the contract as Sidny only played 10 league games for the club.

=== Brasiliense, Paysandu & Comercial ===
In February 2010 Sidny signed a 1-year deal with Brasiliense. Sidny only 3 games in 2010 Campeonato Brasileiro Série B. In December 2010 Sidny left for Paysandu, also in 1-year deal. Sidny played 12 games in 2011 Campeonato Brasileiro Série C, but the team failed to quality to the semi-finals.

In December 2011, Sidny signed a 6 months deal with Comercial de Ribeirão Preto.

In May 2012, Sidny joined Série B side ASA. However he was released on 12 June.
