= Wagner Ribeiro (football agent) =

Brazilian football agent

- Occupation: Football agent

Wagner Ribeiro is a Brazilian football agent, whose more famous clients include Atletico MG's Brazilian forward Robinho, as well as ex-Real Madrid coach Vanderlei Luxemburgo. Ribeiro was instrumental in engineering Robinho's transfer from Brazilian club Santos to Spanish club Real Madrid, who dished out $30 million for the highly rated youngster. On 19 August 2010 he lost a battle against Santos. Chelsea wanted his client, Neymar, but the player did not accept the offer made by Chelsea, and continued to play for Santos, with a new contract.

High-profile clients apart, Ribeiro is known for his controversial statements regarding players and teams. His penchant for making controversial statements was seen most recently when, after the sacking of Luxemburgo, Ribeiro laid into Real Madrid president Florentino Pérez for what he claimed was an "unbalanced squad".

Ribeiro also famously claimed that some of Real Madrid's Spanish players, namely Raúl, Guti and Iván Helguera did not get along with Real Madrid's growing contingent of Brazilian players. His words created a minor crisis at the club, with both fans and the press alike wondering if a lack of team spirit in Real Madrid's dressing room was the cause for their poor form. The crisis subsided to an extent when one of the players Ribeiro named, Iván Helguera, came out to strongly deny his claims.

On 14 July 2014, the same day that Brazil's manager, Luiz Felipe Scolari was sacked or resigned, Ribeiro was reported as describing in detail to the media what he regarded as Scolari's very poor coaching career around the world, and ended by calling Scolari "an old jerk, arrogant, repulsive, conceited and ridiculous".
