= Rodrigo Crasso =

Brazilian footballer

Personal information
- Full name: Rodrigo Crasso Cordeiro
- Date of birth: 25 February 1987 (age 39)
- Place of birth: Curitiba, Brazil
- Height: 1.72 m (5 ft 8 in)
- Position: Left back

Team information
- Current team: Juventude

Youth career
- 2000–2002: Guarani

Senior career*
Years	Team	Apps	(Gls)
2003–2007	Atlético Paranaense	4	(0)
2007	→ Toledo (loan)		
2008–	J. Malucelli		
2009	→ Coritiba (loan)		
2010	→ Oeste (loan)		
2011	→ Cianorte (loan)		
2011	→ Concórdia (loan)		
2011–	→ Juventude (loan)		
- * Club domestic league appearances and goals

Rodrigo Crasso Cordeiro (born 25 February 1987), is a Brazilian footballer who currently plays for Esporte Clube Juventude. He is 1.73 meters tall.

== See also ==
- Football in Brazil
- List of football clubs in Brazil
