= Valença (footballer) =

Brazilian footballer

Personal information
- Full name: Manoel Cordeiro Valença Neto
- Date of birth: March 18, 1982 (age 44)
- Place of birth: Caruaru, Brazil
- Height: 1.80 m (5 ft 11 in)
- Position: Defender

Senior career*
Years	Team	Apps	(Gls)
2002–2006	Santa Cruz	18	(0)
2007	Náutico	2	(0)
2008	Corinthians	0	(0)
2008–2009	Vila Nova		
2010	Joinville		
2011	Marília	5	(0)
2011	Chã Grande		
2012	CSE		
2012	Pesqueira	3	(0)
2013	Lam Pak	16	(2)
2014	Lo Leong (Macau)		
- * Club domestic league appearances and goals

Manoel Cordeiro Valença Neto or simply Valença (born March 18, 1982, in Caruaru), is a Brazilian footballer who plays as a defender. He played in the Brasileirão for Santa Cruz and Náutico.
