= 2007 Sport Club do Recife season =

Sport Recife
2007 season
- Chairman: Milton Caldas Bivar
- Manager: Alexandre Gallo; Giba; Edson Leivinha (c); Geninho
- Stadium: Ilha do Retiro
- Série A: 14th
- Pernambucano: Champions (36th title)
- Copa do Brasil: Round of 16
- Top goalscorer: League: Carlinhos Bala (13); All: Carlinhos Bala (24)
| Home colours | Away colours | Third colours |

The 2007 season was Sport Recife's 103rd season in the club's history. Sport competed in the Campeonato Pernambucano, Série A and Copa do Brasil.

== Squad ==
Note: Flags indicate national team as defined under FIFA eligibility rules; some limited exceptions apply. Players may hold more than one non-FIFA nationality.

| No. | Pos. | Nation | Player |
|---|---|---|---|
| — | GK | BRA | Magrão |
| — | GK | BRA | Cléber |
| — | GK | BRA | Gustavo Nascimento |
| — | DF | BRA | Durval |
| — | DF | BRA | César Lucena |
| — | DF | BRA | Bruno Recife |
| — | DF | BRA | Du Lopes |
| — | DF | BRA | Igor |
| — | DF | BRA | Bia |
| — | DF | BRA | Dutra |
| — | DF | BRA | Gustavo Caiche |
| — | DF | BRA | Serginho Paulista |
| — | MF | BRA | Bilica |
| — | MF | BRA | Túlio |

| No. | Pos. | Nation | Player |
|---|---|---|---|
| — | MF | BRA | Fábio Gomes |
| — | MF | BRA | Ticão |
| — | MF | BRA | Romerito |
| — | MF | BRA | Éverton |
| — | MF | BRA | Diogo |
| — | MF | BRA | Rosembrick |
| — | MF | BRA | William |
| — | MF | BRA | Adriano Gabiru |
| — | MF | BRA | Júnior Maranhão |
| — | FW | BRA | Anderson Aquino |
| — | FW | BRA | Jadílson |
| — | FW | BRA | Washington |
| — | FW | BRA | Carlinhos Bala |
| — | FW | BRA | Weldon |

== Statistics ==
=== Overall ===
| Games played | 61 (18 Pernambucano, 5 Copa do Brasil, 38 Série A) |
| Games won | 32 (16 Pernambucano, 2 Copa do Brasil, 14 Série A) |
| Games drawn | 13 (1 Pernambucano, 3 Copa do Brasil, 9 Série A) |
| Games lost | 16 (1 Pernambucano, 0 Copa do Brasil, 15 Série A) |
| Goals scored | 104 |
| Goals conceded | 65 |
| Goal difference | +39 |
| Best results (goal difference) | 6–0 (H) v Ypiranga - Pernambucano - 2007.03.07 |
| Worst result (goal difference) | 1–5 (H) v Internacional - Série A - 2007.07.29 |
| Top scorer | Carlinhos Bala (24) |

Source: Sport Recife official website

=== Goalscorers ===
| Place | Pos. | Nat. | Name | Campeonato Pernambucano | Copa do Brasil | Série A | Total |
|---|---|---|---|---|---|---|---|
| 1 | FW | (Brazil) | Carlinhos Bala | 10 | 1 | 13 | 24 |
| 2 | MF | (Brazil) | Fumagalli | 6 | 2 | 2 | 10 |
| 3 | FW | (Brazil) | Washington | 4 | 1 | 4 | 9 |
| 4 | FW | (Brazil) | Anderson Aquino | 2 | 0 | 4 | 6 |
| 4 | FW | (Brazil) | Da Silva | 0 | 0 | 6 | 6 |
| 4 | FW | (Brazil) | Weldon | 2 | 1 | 3 | 6 |
| 5 | FW | (Brazil) | Luciano Henrique | 2 | 2 | 1 | 5 |
| 5 | FW | (Brazil) | Romerito | 0 | 0 | 5 | 5 |
| 5 | MF | (Brazil) | Vitor Júnior | 4 | 1 | 0 | 5 |
| 6 | DF | (Brazil) | César Lucena | 1 | 0 | 2 | 3 |
| 6 | DF | (Brazil) | Durval | 0 | 0 | 3 | 3 |
| 6 | MF | (Brazil) | Éverton | 1 | 2 | 0 | 3 |
| 7 | MF | (Brazil) | Adriano Gabiru | 0 | 0 | 2 | 2 |
| 7 | MF | (Brazil) | Bia | 2 | 0 | 0 | 2 |
| 7 | MF | (Brazil) | Rosembrick | 1 | 1 | 0 | 2 |
| 7 | MF | (Brazil) | Ticão | 1 | 0 | 1 | 2 |
| 8 | DF | (Brazil) | Bruno Recife | 0 | 0 | 1 | 1 |
| 8 | MF | (Brazil) | Diego | 1 | 0 | 0 | 1 |
| 8 | DF | (Brazil) | Diogo | 0 | 0 | 1 | 1 |
| 8 | DF | (Brazil) | Gustavo Caiche | 0 | 0 | 1 | 1 |
| 8 | DF | (Brazil) | Igor | 0 | 0 | 1 | 1 |
| 8 | FW | (Brazil) | Jadílson | 1 | 0 | 0 | 1 |
| 8 | MF | (Brazil) | Júnior Maranhão | 0 | 0 | 1 | 1 |
| 8 | DF | (Brazil) | Luisinho Netto | 0 | 0 | 1 | 1 |
| 8 | DF | (Brazil) | Osmar | 1 | 0 | 0 | 1 |
| 8 | FW | (Brazil) | Reginaldo | 0 | 0 | 1 | 1 |
| | | | Own goals | 0 | 0 | 1 | 1 |
| | | | Total | 39 | 11 | 54 | 104 |

== Competitions ==
=== Campeonato Pernambucano ===
==== First stage ====
| 13 January 2007 1 | Sport | 1–0 | Cabense | Recife |
| 16:00 (UTC-3) | Fumagalli 68' (pen.) | | | Stadium: Estádio Adelmar da Costa Carvalho (Ilha do Retiro) |

| 17 January 2007 2 | Ypiranga | 0–2 | Sport | Santa Cruz do Capibaribe |
| 20:40 (UTC-3) | | | Vítor Júnior 52'; Washington 90+1' | Stadium: Estádio Otávio Limeira Alves |

| 21 January 2007 3 | Sport | 2–0 | Central | Recife |
| 16:00 (UTC-3) | Éverton 7'; Osmar 82' | | | Stadium: Estádio Adelmar da Costa Carvalho (Ilha do Retiro) |

| 24 January 2007 4 | Porto | 1–2 | Sport | Caruaru |
| 20:30 (UTC-3) | Nilson Sergipano 13' | | Washington 9'; Jadílson 79' | Stadium: Estádio Antônio Inácio de Souza |

| 28 January 2007 5 | Serrano | 0–1 | Sport | Serra Talhada |
| 15:00 (UTC-3) | | Report | Vítor Júnior 56' | Stadium: Estádio Nildo Pereira de Menezes |

| 1 February 2007 6 | Sport | 5–1 | Vera Cruz | Recife |
| 20:30 (UTC-3) | Fumagalli 9', 18', 25' (pen.); Carlinhos Bala 15', 53' | Report | Rivelino 36' | Stadium: Estádio Adelmar da Costa Carvalho (Ilha do Retiro) |

| 5 February 2007 7 | Náutico | 0–1 | Sport | Recife |
| 20:30 (UTC-3) | | | Vitor Júnior 31' | Stadium: Estádio Eládio de Barros Carvalho (Aflitos) |

| 7 February 2007 8 | Belo Jardim | 0–3 | Sport | Belo Jardim |
| 20:40 (UTC-3) | | | Anderson Aquino 5'; Fumagalli 31'; Diego 86' | Stadium: Estádio José Mendonça Bezerra |

| 11 February 2007 9 | Sport | 1–1 | Santa Cruz | Recife |
| 15:00 (UTC-3) | Rosembrick 22' | Report | Marco Antônio 67' | Stadium: Estádio Adelmar da Costa Carvalho (Ilha do Retiro) |

==== Second stage ====
| 4 March 2007 1 | Cabense | 1–3 | Sport | Cabo de Santo Agostinho |
| 16:00 (UTC-3) | Guto 68' | Report | Carlinhos Bala 40'; Bia 79'; Ticão 81' | Stadium: Estádio Gileno de Carli |

| 7 March 2007 2 | Sport | 6–0 | Ypiranga | Recife |
| 20:30 (UTC-3) | César Lucena 11'; Carlinhos Bala 23', 86'; Luciano Henrique 36'; Bia 63'; Anderson Aquino 78' | Report | | Stadium: Estádio Adelmar da Costa Carvalho (Ilha do Retiro) |

| 11 March 2007 3 | Central | 0–1 | Sport | Caruaru |
| 16:00 (UTC-3) | | | Carlinhos Bala 14' | Stadium: Estádio Luiz José de Lacerda (Lacerdão) |

| 18 March 2007 4 | Sport | 2–0 | Porto | Recife |
| 17:30 (UTC-3) | Vitor Júnior 31'; Weldon 36' | | | Stadium: Estádio Adelmar da Costa Carvalho (Ilha do Retiro) |

| 25 March 2007 5 | Sport | 2–1 | Serrano | Recife |
| 16:00 (UTC-3) | Carlinhos Bala 15', 90+3' | Report | Jessui 78' | Stadium: Estádio Adelmar da Costa Carvalho (Ilha do Retiro); Attendance: 12,489; Referee: Cláudio Mercante |

| 28 March 2007 6 | Vera Cruz | 1–2 | Sport | Vitória de Santo Antão |
| 21:40 (UTC-3) | Fabinho Recife 15' | | Carlinhos Bala 9' (pen.); Washington 85' | Stadium: Estádio Municipal Severino Cândido Carneiro |

| 1 April 2007 7 | Sport | 2–0 | Náutico | Recife |
| 17:30 (UTC-3) | Weldon 36'; Luciano Henrique 64' | Report | | Stadium: Estádio Adelmar da Costa Carvalho (Ilha do Retiro); Attendance: 32,048; Referee: Cláudio Mercante |

| 8 April 2007 8 | Sport | 3–0 | Belo Jardim | Recife |
| 16:00 (UTC-3) | Fumagalli 72'; Carlinhos Bala 73'; Washington 85' | Report | | Stadium: Estádio Adelmar da Costa Carvalho (Ilha do Retiro); Attendance: 10,061; Referee: Ricardo Tavares |

| 11 April 2007 9 | Santa Cruz | 1–0 | Sport | Recife |
| 20:30 (UTC-3) | Marquinhos 52' | Report | | Stadium: Estádio José do Rego Maciel (Arruda) |

==== Record ====
| Final Position | Points | Matches | Wins | Draws | Losses | Goals For | Goals Away | Avg% |
|---|---|---|---|---|---|---|---|---|
| 1st | 49 | 18 | 16 | 1 | 1 | 39 | 7 | 91% |

=== Copa do Brasil ===
==== First round ====
| 21 February 2007 | Campinense | 1–1 | Sport | Campina Grande |
| 21:45 (UTC-3) | Júnior Ferrim 16' | Report | Rosembrick 15' | Stadium: Estádio Governador Ernani Sátyro (Amigão); Attendance: 4,798; Referee: Suelson Diógenes de França Medeiros |

| 28 February 2007 | Sport | 3–0 | Campinense | Recife |
| 20:30 (UTC-3) | Éverton 6', 32'; Fumagalli 56' (pen.) | Report | | Stadium: Estádio Adelmar da Costa Carvalho (Ilha do Retiro); Attendance: 12,662; Referee: Leonardo Marques Fortes |

==== Second round ====
| 14 March 2007 | Ananindeua | 0–5 | Sport | Belém |
| 21:45 (UTC-3) | | Report | Luciano Henrique 37', 40'; Weldon 61'; Vitor Júnior 71'; Washington 86' | Stadium: Estádio Olímpico do Pará (Mangueirão); Attendance: 2,535; Referee: Fernando Augusto Ribeiro |

==== Round of 16 ====
| 18 April 2007 | Ipatinga | 1–1 | Sport | Ipatinga |
| 21:45 (UTC-3) | Ferreira 59' | Report | Fumagalli 79' | Stadium: Estádio Municipal João Lamego Netto (Ipatingão); Attendance: 3,213; Referee: Cléber Wellington Abade |

| 25 April 2007 | Sport | 1–1 (2–4 p) | Ipatinga | Recife |
| 21:45 (UTC-3) | Carlinhos Bala 34' | Report | Beto 51' | Stadium: Estádio Adelmar da Costa Carvalho (Ilha do Retiro); Attendance: 24,055; Referee: Wilson Luiz Seneme |
| | Penalties |
| | Luciano Henrique (penalty scored); Ticão (penalty scored); Washington (penalty missed); Fumagalli (penalty missed) | | (penalty scored) Diego Silva; (penalty scored) Matheus Lopes; (penalty scored) Éverton; (penalty scored) Adeílson |

==== Record ====
| Final Position | Points | Matches | Wins | Draws | Losses | Goals For | Goals Away | Avg% |
|---|---|---|---|---|---|---|---|---|
| 11th | 9 | 5 | 2 | 3 | 0 | 11 | 3 | 60% |

=== Série A ===
| 13 May 2007 1 | Sport | 4–1 | Santos | Recife |
| 18:10 (UTC-3) | Weldon 10'; Fumagalli 36'; Durval 40'; Washington 90+1' | Report | Pedrinho 2' | Stadium: Estádio Adelmar da Costa Carvalho (Ilha do Retiro); Attendance: 24,736; Referee: Antônio Hora Filho |

| 20 May 2007 2 | Vasco da Gama | 3–1 | Sport | Rio de Janeiro |
| 18:10 (UTC-3) | André Dias 3', 37'; Romário 48' (pen.) | Report x | Luciano Henrique 82' | Stadium: Estádio Vasco da Gama (São Januário); Attendance: 16,682; Referee: Giulliano Bozzano |

| 27 May 2007 3 | Grêmio | 1–0 | Sport | Porto Alegre |
| 16:00 (UTC-3) | Du Lopes 2' (o.g.) | Report | | Stadium: Estádio Olímpico Monumental; Attendance: 28,128; Referee: Willian Souza Nery |

| 3 June 2007 4 | Sport | 2–2 | Flamengo | Recife |
| 16:00 (UTC-3) | Washington 34'; Fumagalli 77' | Report | Renato Abreu 15' (pen.), 61' | Stadium: Estádio Adelmar da Costa Carvalho (Ilha do Retiro); Attendance: 33,767; Referee: Evandro Rogério Roman |

| 10 June 2007 5 | Fluminense | 3–0 | Sport | Rio de Janeiro |
| 16:00 (UTC-3) | Alex Dias 40'; Rodrigo Tiuí 70'; Cícero 86' | Report | | Stadium: Estádio Jornalista Mário Filho (Maracanã); Attendance: 35,848; Referee: Giulliano Bozzano |

| 17 June 2007 6 | Sport | 2–2 | América–RN | Recife |
| 18:10 (UTC-3) | Durval 23'; Carlinhos Bala 69' | Report | Luciano Dias 13', 32' | Stadium: Estádio Adelmar da Costa Carvalho (Ilha do Retiro); Attendance: 21,067; Referee: Marco Antônio Sampaio |

| 23 June 2007 7 | Paraná | 1–0 | Sport | Curitiba |
| 18:10 (UTC-3) | Beto 30' | Report | | Stadium: Estádio Durival Britto e Silva (Vila Capanema); Attendance: 11,259; Referee: Elmo Resende Cunha |

| 28 June 2007 8 | Sport | 4–1 | Náutico | Recife |
| 20:30 (UTC-3) | Durval 4'; Carlinhos Bala 11', 50'; Washington 58' | Report | Hamílton 76' | Stadium: Estádio Adelmar da Costa Carvalho (Ilha do Retiro); Attendance: 22,745; Referee: Wilson Souza Mendonça |

| 4 July 2007 9 | Sport | 2–1 | Corinthians | Recife |
| 16:00 (UTC-3) | Igor 45+1'; Weldon 80' | Report | Dinélson 57' | Stadium: Estádio Adelmar da Costa Carvalho (Ilha do Retiro); Attendance: 32,337; Referee: Washington Alves de Souza |

| 7 July 2007 10 | Goiás | 3–2 | Sport | Goiânia |
| 18:10 (UTC-3) | Felipe Menezes 76', 90+2'; Paulo Baier 82' | Report | Ticão 28'; Washington 60' | Stadium: Estádio do Governo do Estado de Goiás (Serra Dourada); Attendance: 9,336; Referee: Leandro Pedro Vuaden |

| 14 July 2007 11 | Sport | 2–0 | Atlético Mineiro | Recife |
| 16:00 (UTC-3) | Diogo 17'; Carlinhos Bala 49' | Report | | Stadium: Estádio Adelmar da Costa Carvalho (Ilha do Retiro); Attendance: 24,840; Referee: Luís Antônio Silva Santos |

| 18 July 2007 12 | Figueirense | 0–1 | Sport | Florianópolis |
| 19:30 (UTC-3) | | Report | Carlinhos Bala 88' | Stadium: Estádio Orlando Scarpelli; Attendance: 5,851; Referee: Álvaro Azeredo Quelhas |

| 22 July 2007 13 | Sport | 3–3 | Botafogo | Recife |
| 18:10 (UTC-3) | Bruno Recife 46'; Carlinhos Bala 56', 76' | Report | André Lima 36', 51', 90+3' | Stadium: Estádio Adelmar da Costa Carvalho (Ilha do Retiro); Attendance: 27,570; Referee: Wilson Luiz Seneme |

| 26 July 2007 14 | São Paulo | 3–1 | Sport | São Paulo |
| 20:30 (UTC-3) | Leandro 48'; Souza 55'; Rogério Ceni 81' | Report | Weldon 30' | Stadium: Estádio Cícero Pompeu de Toledo (Morumbi); Attendance: 7,236; Referee: Leonardo Gaciba da Silva |

| 29 July 2007 15 | Sport | 1–5 | Internacional | Recife |
| 16:00 (UTC-3) | Edinho 25' (o.g.) | Report | Pinga 8'; Índio 33'; Iarley 44'; Alex 77'; Adriano 86' | Stadium: Estádio Adelmar da Costa Carvalho (Ilha do Retiro); Attendance: 24,096; Referee: Djalma José Beltrami |

| 1 August 2007 16 | Palmeiras | 1–2 | Sport | São Paulo |
| 20:30 (UTC-3) | Martinez 8' | Report | César Lucena 29'; Da Silva 45' | Stadium: Estádio Palestra Itália (Parque Antártica); Attendance: 6,228; Referee: Alicio Pena Júnior |

| 4 August 2007 17 | Sport | 3–2 | Atlético Paranaense | Recife |
| 18:10 (UTC-3) | Anderson Aquino 46'; César Lucena 81'; Romerito 88' | Report | Dinei 23'; Marcelo Ramos 42' | Stadium: Estádio Adelmar da Costa Carvalho (Ilha do Retiro); Attendance: 23,265; Referee: Antônio Hora Filho |

| 8 August 2007 18 | Cruzeiro | 2–0 | Sport | Belo Horizonte |
| 19:30 (UTC-3) | Alecsandro 64', 87' | Report | | Stadium: Estádio Governador Magalhães Pinto (Mineirão); Attendance: 16,932; Referee: Elvécio Zequetto |

| 11 August 2007 19 | Sport | 3–0 | Juventude | Recife |
| 18:10 (UTC-3) | Anderson Aquino 10', 39'; Carlinhos Bala 74' | Report | | Stadium: Estádio Adelmar da Costa Carvalho (Ilha do Retiro); Attendance: 23,463; Referee: Domingos Viana Filho |

| 18 August 2007 20 | Santos | 2–0 | Sport | Santos |
| 18:10 (UTC-3) | Kléber Pereira 25'; Pedrinho 54' | Report | | Stadium: Estádio Urbano Caldeira (Vila Belmiro); Attendance: 10,446; Referee: Djalma José Beltrami Teixeira |

| 26 August 2007 21 | Sport | 0–0 | Vasco da Gama | Recife |
| 18:10 (UTC-3) | | Report | | Stadium: Estádio Adelmar da Costa Carvalho (Ilha do Retiro); Attendance: 25,435; Referee: Washington Alves de Souza |

| 29 August 2007 22 | Sport | 2–0 | Grêmio | Recife |
| 21:45 (UTC-3) | Da Silva 43' (pen.); Carlinhos Bala 75' | Report | | Stadium: Estádio Adelmar da Costa Carvalho (Ilha do Retiro); Attendance: 21,887; Referee: Domingos Viana Filho |

| 1 September 2007 23 | Flamengo | 1–1 | Sport | Rio de Janeiro |
| 18:10 (UTC-3) | Thiago Sales 21' | Report | Da Silva 74' (pen.) | Stadium: Estádio Jornalista Mário Filho (Maracanã); Attendance: 61,208; Referee: Sérgio da Silva Carvalho |

| 6 September 2007 24 | Sport | 0–2 | Fluminense | Recife |
| 20:30 (UTC-3) | | Report | Cícero 72'; Rodrigo Tiuí 87' | Stadium: Estádio Adelmar da Costa Carvalho (Ilha do Retiro); Attendance: 25,497; Referee: Carlos Eugenio Simon |

| 9 September 2007 25 | América–RN | 1–1 | Sport | Natal |
| 19:00 (UTC-3) | Leandro Sena 4' | Report | Carlinhos Bala 63' | Stadium: Estádio Dr. João Cláudio Vasconcelos Machado (Machadão); Attendance: 3,357; Referee: Rogério L da Rocha |

| 16 September 2007 26 | Sport | 3–1 | Paraná | Recife |
| 16:00 (UTC-3) | Romerito 2'; Da Silva 41'; Carlinhos Bala 85' | Report | Jefferson 75' | Stadium: Estádio Adelmar da Costa Carvalho (Ilha do Retiro); Attendance: 21,139; Referee: Emerson Batista da Silva |

| 23 September 2007 27 | Náutico | 2–0 | Sport | Recife |
| 16:00 (UTC-3) | Júlio César 37', 78' | Report | | Stadium: Estádio Eládio de Barros Carvalho (Aflitos); Attendance: 19,135; Referee: Emerson Luiz Sobral |

| 29 September 2007 28 | Corinthians | 1–2 | Sport | São Paulo |
| 18:10 (UTC-3) | Betão 85' | Report | Romerito 31', 63' | Stadium: Estádio Municipal Paulo Machado de Carvalho (Pacaembu); Attendance: 30,065; Referee: Leonardo Gaciba |

| 3 October 2007 29 | Sport | 4–0 | Goiás | Recife |
| 19:30 (UTC-3) | Júnior Maranhão 5'; Adriano Gabiru 41'; Anderson Aquino 58'; Luisinho Netto 72' (pen.) | Report | | Stadium: Estádio Adelmar da Costa Carvalho (Ilha do Retiro); Attendance: 23,372; Referee: Ricardo Marques Ribeiro |

| 7 October 2007 30 | Atlético Mineiro | 3–1 | Sport | Belo Horizonte |
| 16:00 (UTC-3) | Éder Luís 38'; Eduardo Pacheco 81'; Marinho 87' | Report | Romerito 29' | Stadium: Estádio Governador Magalhães Pinto (Mineirão); Attendance: 37,038; Referee: Sérgio da Silva Carvalho |

| 12 October 2007 31 | Sport | 0–0 | Figueirense | Recife |
| 20:30 (UTC-3) | | | | Stadium: Estádio Adelmar da Costa Carvalho (Ilha do Retiro); Attendance: 23,662; Referee: Rogério Pereira da Costa |

| 20 October 2007 32 | Botafogo | 3–1 | Sport | Rio de Janeiro |
| 18:10 (UTC-3) | Lúcio Flávio 5'; Luciano Almeida 49'; Dodô 57' | Report | Reginaldo 85' | Stadium: Estádio Olímpico João Havelange (Engenhão); Attendance: 15,560; Referee: Paulo César Oliveira |

| 28 October 2007 33 | Sport | 1–2 | São Paulo | Recife |
| 16:00 (UTC-3) | Da Silva 64' (pen.) | Report | Rogério Ceni 25'; Aloísio 61' | Stadium: Estádio Adelmar da Costa Carvalho (Ilha do Retiro); Attendance: 35,259; Referee: Marcelo de Lima Henrique |

| 1 November 2007 34 | Internacional | 0–0 | Sport | Porto Alegre |
| 20:30 (UTC-3) | | Report | | Stadium: Estádio José Pinheiro Borda (Beira-Rio); Attendance: 16,955; Referee: Paulo César Oliveira |

| 4 November 2007 35 | Sport | 3–1 | Palmeiras | Recife |
| 18:10 (UTC-3) | Da Silva 25' (pen.); Carlinhos Bala 56', 65' | Report | Caio 48' (pen.) | Stadium: Estádio Adelmar da Costa Carvalho (Ilha do Retiro); Attendance: 28,693; Referee: Carlos Eugênio Simon |

| 11 November 2007 36 | Atlético Paranaense | 0–0 | Sport | Curitiba |
| 17:00 (UTC-3) | | Report | | Stadium: Kyocera Arena (Arena da Baixada); Attendance: 14,358; Referee: Marcelo de Lima Henrique |

| 25 November 2007 37 | Sport | 1–0 | Cruzeiro | Recife |
| 18:10 (UTC-3) | Adriano Gabiru 65' | Report | | Stadium: Estádio Adelmar da Costa Carvalho (Ilha do Retiro); Attendance: 31,119; Referee: Leonardo Gaciba |

| 2 December 2007 38 | Juventude | 2–1 | Sport | Caxias do Sul |
| 16:00 (UTC-3) | Tiago Cavalcanti 46'; William Fabro 68' | Report | Gustavo Caiche 50' | Stadium: Estádio Alfredo Jaconi; Attendance: 624; Referee: Jaílson Macedo Freitas |

==== Record ====
| Final Position | Points | Matches | Wins | Draws | Losses | Goals For | Goals Away | Avg% |
|---|---|---|---|---|---|---|---|---|
| 14th | 51 | 38 | 14 | 9 | 15 | 54 | 55 | 45% |
