= 2010 Clube Náutico Capibaribe season =

Náutico
2010 season
- Chairman: Berillo Júnior
- Manager: Guilherme Macuglia; Alexandre Gallo; Roberto Fernandes
- Stadium: Estádio dos Aflitos
- Série B: 13th
- Pernambucano: Runners-up
- Copa do Brasil: Second round
- Copa do Nordeste: First stage
- Top goalscorer: League: Bruno Meneghel and Geílson (8); All: Bruno Meneghel (16)
Home colours	Away colours	Third colours

The 2010 season was Náutico's 110th season in the club's history.

== Squad ==
Note: Flags indicate national team as defined under FIFA eligibility rules; some limited exceptions apply. Players may hold more than one non-FIFA nationality.

No.	Pos.	Nation	Player
1	GK	BRA	Glédson
2	DF	BRA	Daniel
3	DF	BRA	Ediglê
4	DF	BRA	Vinícius
6	DF	BRA	Rafael
7	FW	BRA	Bruno Meneghel
8	MF	BRA	Derley
9	MF	BRA	Emanuel
10	FW	BRA	Carlinhos Bala
11	MF	BRA	Zé Carlos
12	GK	BRA	Gustavo
13	MF	BRA	Márcio Tinga
14	DF	BRA	Igor
15	MF	BRA	Nilson
16	MF	BRA	Hélton Luiz
17	MF	BRA	Thiaguinho
18	FW	BRA	Geílson
44	MF	BRA	Derley
—	DF	BRA	Altemar
—	DF	BRA	Wescley Gonçalves

No.	Pos.	Nation	Player
—	DF	BRA	Anderson Santana
—	DF	BRA	Caranga
—	DF	BRA	Dênis
—	DF	BRA	Diego
—	DF	BRA	Diego Bispo
—	DF	BRA	Gomes
—	DF	BRA	Luiz Alberto
—	DF	BRA	Michel
—	DF	BRA	Wellington
—	MF	BRA	Dinda
—	MF	BRA	Eduardo Eré
—	MF	BRA	Felipe Pinto
—	MF	BRA	Itamar
—	MF	BRA	Juliano
—	MF	BRA	Marcelo
—	MF	BRA	Marquinhos
—	MF	BRA	Ramirez
—	FW	BRA	Élton
—	FW	BRA	Philip
—	FW	BRA	Rodrigo Dantas

== Statistics ==
=== Overall ===
Games played	82 (26 Pernambucano, 14 Copa do Nordeste, 4 Copa do Brasil, 38 Série B)
Games won	34 (15 Pernambucano, 4 Copa do Nordeste, 1 Copa do Brasil, 14 Série B)
Games drawn	17 (5 Pernambucano, 5 Copa do Nordeste, 1 Copa do Brasil, 6 Série B)
Games lost	31 (6 Pernambucano, 5 Copa do Nordeste, 2 Copa do Brasil, 18 Série B)
Goals scored	112
Goals conceded	118
Goal difference	–6
Best results (goal difference)	4–1 (H) v Central – Pernambucano – 2010.04.08; 4–1 (H) v Fortaleza – Copa do Nordeste – 2010.07.04; 4–1 (H) v Vila Nova – Série B – 2010.11.20
Worst result (goal difference)	0–5 (A) v Vitória – Copa do Brasil – 2010.03.31; 0–5 (A) v São Caetano – Série B – 2010.06.01
Top scorer	Bruno Meneghel (16)

Source: Náutico official website

=== Goalscorers ===
Place	Pos.	Nat.	No.	Name	Campeonato Pernambucano	Copa do Nordeste	Copa do Brasil	Série B	Total
1	FW	(Brazil)	7	Bruno Meneghel	8	0	0	8	16
2	FW	(Brazil)	18	Geílson	4	3	0	8	15
3	FW	(Brazil)	10	Carlinhos Bala	12	0	1	1	14
4	MF	(Brazil)	11	Zé Carlos	3	0	0	6	9
5	FW	(Brazil)		Cristiano	0	1	0	3	4
5	MF	(Brazil)	8	Derley	4	0	0	0	4
6	MF	(Brazil)		Dinda	2	0	1	0	3
6	MF	(Brazil)		Erick	0	3	0	0	3
6	MF	(Brazil)		Giovanni	0	1	0	2	3
6	FW	(Brazil)		Rodrigo Dantas	3	0	0	0	3
6	FW	(Brazil)	17	Thiaguinho	0	2	0	1	3
7	MF	(Brazil)	8	Élton	1	0	0	1	2
7	MF	(Brazil)	9	Emanuel	1	1	0	0	2
7	FW	(Brazil)		Erivelto	0	2	0	0	2
7	FW	(Brazil)		Evando	0	0	0	2	2
7	MF	(Brazil)		Francismar	0	0	0	2	2
7	MF	(Brazil)	16	Juliano	2	0	0	0	2
7	MF	(Brazil)	7	Nilson	1	1	0	0	2
7	MF	(Brazil)		Tiago Lima	0	2	0	0	2
7	DF	(Brazil)	13	Walter	0	1	0	1	2
8	FW	(Brazil)		Bruno Veiga	0	0	0	1	1
8	DF	(Brazil)		Daniel	0	0	1	0	1
8	DF	(Brazil)		Diego Bispo	1	0	0	0	1
8	MF	(Brazil)		Felipe Pinto	1	0	0	0	1
8	DF	(Brazil)		Flávio Kaká	0	0	0	1	1
8	MF	(Brazil)		Hamílton	1	0	0	0	1
8	MF	(Brazil)		Hélder	0	1	0	0	1
8	DF	(Brazil)	14	Igor	1	0	0	0	1
8	MF	(Brazil)		Itamar	1	0	0	0	1
8	FW	(Brazil)		Joélson	0	0	0	1	1
8	FW	(Brazil)		Max	0	0	0	1	1
8	MF	(Brazil)		Ramirez	0	0	0	1	1
8	MF	(Brazil)	16	Rodrigo Pontes	0	0	0	1	1
8	MF	(Brazil)		Tárcio	0	1	0	0	1
8	DF	(Brazil)	4	Vinícius	1	0	0	0	1
8	DF	(Brazil)		Wallace	0	1	0	0	1
				Own goals	0	0	1	0	1
				Total	47	20	4	41	112

== Competitions ==
=== Campeonato Pernambucano ===
==== First stage ====
13 January 2010 1	Vera Cruz	1–0	Náutico	Vitória de Santo Antão
20:30 (UTC-3)	Alcimar 61'	Report		Stadium: Estádio Municipal Severino Cândido Carneiro

16 January 2010 2	Náutico	2–1	Salgueiro	Recife
16:00 (UTC-3)	Derley 54', 64'	Report	Goal	Stadium: Estádio Eládio de Barros Carvalho (Aflitos)

20 January 2010 3	Ypiranga	2–2	Náutico	Santa Cruz do Capibaribe
20:30 (UTC-3)	Rosembrick 28'; Marcelo Muniz 75'		Carlinhos Bala 21', 59'	Stadium: Estádio Otávio Limeira Alves

24 January 2010 4	Náutico	3–1	Sete de Setembro	Recife
16:00 (UTC-3)	Juliano 2', 53'; Zé Carlos 61'		Leonardo 30'	Stadium: Estádio Eládio de Barros Carvalho (Aflitos)

27 January 2010 5	Náutico	2–1	Santa Cruz	Recife
20:30 (UTC-3)	Dinda 44'; Itamar 78'		Joelson 57'	Stadium: Estádio Eládio de Barros Carvalho (Aflitos); Attendance: 15,044; Referee: Cláudio Mercante

31 January 2010 6	Araripina	1–2	Náutico	Araripina
16:00 (UTC-3)	Goal	Report	Rodrigo Dantas; Nilson	Stadium: Estádio Gilson Tiburtino de Souza (Chapadão do Araripe)

3 February 2010 7	Cabense	0–1	Náutico	Cabo de Santo Agostinho
21:00 (UTC-3)			Carlinhos Bala 77'	Stadium: Estádio Gileno de Carli

7 February 2010 8	Náutico	1–0	Vitória das Tabocas	Recife
18:00 (UTC-3)	Carlinhos Bala (pen.)			Stadium: Estádio Eládio de Barros Carvalho (Aflitos)

10 February 2010 9	Central	1–0	Náutico	Caruaru
21:00 (UTC-3)	Rodrigo Mucarbel 57'			Stadium: Estádio Luiz José de Lacerda (Lacerdão); Attendance: 5,862; Referee: Emerson Batista

17 February 2010 10	Náutico	1–2	Porto	Recife
20:30 (UTC-3)	Derley 35'		Arlindo 46'; Fabian	Stadium: Estádio Eládio de Barros Carvalho (Aflitos)

20 February 2010 11	Sport	1–1	Náutico	Recife
17:00 (UTC-3)	Wilson		Hamílton 58'	Stadium: Estádio Adelmar da Costa Carvalho (Ilha do Retiro)

28 February 2010 12	Náutico	1–1	Vera Cruz	Recife
16:00 (UTC-3)	Élton		Vassoura	Stadium: Estádio Eládio de Barros Carvalho (Aflitos)

3 March 2010 13	Salgueiro	0–1	Náutico	Salgueiro
20:30 (UTC-3)			Emanuel 6'	Stadium: Estádio Cornélio de Barros (Salgueirão)

6 March 2010 14	Náutico	4–4	Ypiranga	Recife
16:00 (UTC-3)	Bruno Meneghel; Zé Carlos; Carlinhos Bala, (pen.)		Vágner; Wendel; João Paulo; Rosembrick	Stadium: Estádio Eládio de Barros Carvalho (Aflitos)

14 March 2010 15	Sete de Setembro	2–3	Náutico	Garanhuns
16:00 (UTC-3)	Alick 31'; Laércio 78' (pen.)		Bruno Meneghel 20'; Carlinhos Bala 48' (pen.), (pen.)	Stadium: Estádio Marco Antônio Maciel (Gigante do Agreste)

21 March 2010 16	Santa Cruz	4–2	Náutico	Recife
17:00 (UTC-3)	Edson 42'; Brasão 62', 86'; Jackson 90+1'		Igor 84'; Derley 85'	Stadium: Estádio José do Rego Maciel (Arruda); Attendance: 28,756; Referee: Nielson Nogueira Dias

24 March 2010 17	Náutico	3–0	Araripina	Recife
19:30 (UTC-3)	Zé Carlos 8'; Bruno Meneghel (pen.); Geílson 85' (pen.)			Stadium: Estádio Eládio de Barros Carvalho (Aflitos)

27 March 2010 18	Náutico	3–1	Cabense	Recife
17:00 (UTC-3)	Bruno Meneghel; Rodrigo Dantas 61'; Carlinhos Bala		Márcio	Stadium: Estádio Eládio de Barros Carvalho (Aflitos)

4 April 2010 19	Vitória das Tabocas	3–2	Náutico	Vitória de Santo Antão
17:00 (UTC-3)	Jadílson 53', 90+3'} Sandro Miguel 82' (pen.)		Dinda 64'; Diego Bispo 75'	Stadium: Estádio Municipal Severino Cândido Carneiro

8 April 2010 20	Náutico	4–1	Central	Recife
20:30 (UTC-3)	Bruno Meneghel 14', 70' (pen.); Vinícius 57'; Geílson 75' (pen.)	Report	Élton 59'	Stadium: Estádio Eládio de Barros Carvalho (Aflitos)

11 April 2010 21	Porto	0–3	Náutico	Caruaru
17:00 (UTC-3)			Geílson 9', (pen.); Felipe Pinto	Stadium: Estádio Luiz José de Lacerda (Lacerdão)

18 April 2010 22	Náutico	2–0	Sport	Recife
17:00 (UTC-3)	Carlinhos Bala (pen.); Bruno Meneghel			Stadium: Estádio Eládio de Barros Carvalho (Aflitos)

==== Semi-finals ====
25 April 2010	Santa Cruz	0–0	Náutico	Recife
16:00 (UTC-3)				Stadium: Estádio José do Rego Maciel (Arruda); Attendance: 24,572; Referee: Wilton Pereira Sampaio

28 April 2010	Náutico	1–0	Santa Cruz	Recife
21:00 (UTC-3)	Carlinhos Bala 68'			Stadium: Estádio Eládio de Barros Carvalho (Aflitos); Attendance: 14,025; Referee: Wilson Luiz Seneme

==== Finals ====
2 May 2010	Náutico	3–2	Sport	Recife
21:00 (UTC-3)	Rodrigo Dantas 10'; Bruno Meneghel 26'; Carlinhos Bala 55'		Zé Antônio 66'; Tobi 71'	Stadium: Estádio Eládio de Barros Carvalho (Aflitos); Attendance: 18,052; Referee: Marcelo de Lima Henrique

5 May 2010	Sport	1–0	Náutico	Recife
20:30 (UTC-3)	Leandrão 28'			Stadium: Estádio Adelmar da Costa Carvalho (Ilha do Retiro); Referee: Alicio Pena Júnior

==== Record ====
Final Position	Points	Matches	Wins	Draws	Losses	Goals For	Goals Away	Avg%
2nd	50	26	15	5	6	47	30	64%

=== Copa do Nordeste ===
==== First stage ====
10 June 2010 1	Náutico	2–1	Ceará	Recife
21:00 (UTC-3)	Erick; Giovanni (pen.)		Lopes (pen.)	Stadium: Estádio Eládio de Barros Carvalho (Aflitos)

16 June 2010 2	Treze	4–3	Náutico	Campina Grande
19:00 (UTC-3)	Roni Dias 3'; Pio 14' (pen.), Cléo 24'		Erivelton; Tiago Lima,	Stadium: Estádio Governador Ernani Sátyro (Amigão)

19 June 2010 3	Náutico	0–0	CRB	Recife
16:00 (UTC-3)				Stadium: Estádio Eládio de Barros Carvalho (Aflitos)

23 June 2010 4	ABC	4–1	Náutico	Natal
21:00 (UTC-3)	Éderson 12'; João Paulo 26'; Edson 43'; Zulu 82'		Wallace 77'	Stadium: Estádio Maria Lamas Farache (Frasqueirão); Attendance: 3,106; Referee: Clizaldo Luis Maroja

26 June 2010 5	Náutico	3–0	Bahia	Recife
18:00 (UTC-3)	Élder; Nilson; Tácio	Report		Stadium: Estádio Eládio de Barros Carvalho (Aflitos)

30 June 2010 6	Confiança	2–2	Náutico	Aracaju
20:30 (UTC-3)	Vovô 19'; Cristiano	Report	Thiaguinho 37', 80'	Stadium: Estádio Lourival Baptista (Batistão)

4 July 2010 7	Náutico	4–1	Fortaleza	Recife
17:00 (UTC-3)	Geílson,, Walter		Gaúcho (pen.)	Stadium: Estádio Eládio de Barros Carvalho (Aflitos)

7 July 2010 8	Fluminense de Feira	0–2	Náutico	Feira de Santana
20:30 (UTC-3)		Report	Emanuel 10'; Erick 38'	Stadium: Estádio Municipal Alberto Oliveira (Joia da Princesa)

10 July 2010 9	Náutico	1–1	Santa Cruz	Recife
16:00 (UTC-3)	Erivelto 44'		Evandro 45+1'	Stadium: Estádio Eládio de Barros Carvalho (Aflitos); Attendance: 2,238; Referee: Francisco Almeida Filho

29 July 2010 10	Botafogo–PB	1–1	Náutico	João Pessoa
20:30 (UTC-3)	Chapinha 19'	Report	Erick 66'	Stadium: Estádio José Américo de Almeida Filho (Almeidão)

4 August 2010 11	Náutico	0–3	CSA	Recife
20:30 (UTC-3)			Alisson; Lau; Castanha	Stadium: Estádio Eládio de Barros Carvalho (Aflitos); Attendance: 794

19 August 2010 12	América–RN	0–0	Náutico	Aracaju
20:30 (UTC-3)				Stadium: Estádio Lourival Baptista (Batistão)

7 October 2010 14	Sergipe	1–0	Náutico	Aracaju
20:30 (UTC-3)	Hugo Henrique (pen.)	Report		Stadium: Estádio Lourival Baptista (Batistão)

27 October 2010 13*	Náutico	1–2	Vitória	Recife
18:40 (UTC-3)	Cristiano 21'	Report	Leilson 62'; Kleiton Domingues 87'	Stadium: Estádio Eládio de Barros Carvalho (Aflitos); Attendance: 101; Referee: Frederico Alves Durães

==== Record ====
Final Position	Points	Matches	Wins	Draws	Losses	Goals For	Goals Away	Avg%
10th	17	14	4	5	5	20	20	40%

=== Copa do Brasil ===
==== First round ====
24 February 2010	Ivinhema	1–1	Náutico	Ivinhema
20:00 (UTC-4)	Kanu 45+3'	Report	Celinho 55' (o.g.)	Stadium: Estádio Luiz Saraiva Vieira (Saraivão); Referee: Edivaldo Elias da Silva

10 March 2010	Náutico	3–1	Ivinhema	Recife
21:00 (UTC-3)	Daniel 22'; Dinda 61'; Carlinhos Bala 79'	Report	Negretti 12'	Stadium: Estádio Eládio de Barros Carvalho (Aflitos)

==== Second round ====
17 March 2010	Náutico	0–1	Vitória	Recife
21:00 (UTC-3)		Report	Bida 83'	Stadium: Estádio Eládio de Barros Carvalho (Aflitos); Referee: Jefferson Schimidt

31 March 2010	Vitória	5–0	Náutico	Salvador
21:00 (UTC-3)	Ramon 26'; Júnior 36'; Nino Paraíba 45'; Elkeson 60'; Renato 86'	Report		Stadium: Estádio Manoel Barradas (Barradão); Referee: Alicio Pena Júnior

==== Record ====
Final Position	Points	Matches	Wins	Draws	Losses	Goals For	Goals Away	Avg%
29th	4	4	1	1	2	4	8	33%

=== Série B ===
8 May 2010 1	Náutico	3–1	Coritiba	Recife
16:10 (UTC-3)	Bruno Meneghel 45', 57'; Geílson 48'	Report	Marcos Paulo 56'	Stadium: Estádio Eládio de Barros Carvalho (Aflitos); Referee: Wladyrisson Silva Oliveira

15 May 2010 2	Duque de Caxias	1–2	Náutico	Volta Redonda
16:10 (UTC-3)	Marcelo 19'	Report	Evando 14'; Geilson 58'	Stadium: Estádio Municipal General Sylvio (Raulino de Oliveira); Referee: Marcos André Gomes da Penha

22 May 2010 3	Náutico	1–1	Bragantino	Recife
21:00 (UTC-3)	Evando 39'	Report	Danilo Bueno 77'	Stadium: Estádio Eládio de Barros Carvalho (Aflitos); Referee: Suelson Diógenes de França Medeiros

25 May 2010 4	Figueirense	1–2	Náutico	Florianópolis
19:30 (UTC-3)	Lucas 33'	Report	Carlinhos Bala 22'; Bruno Meneghel 44'	Stadium: Estádio Orlando Scarpelli; Referee: Márcio Chagas da Silva

28 May 2010 5	Náutico	2–2	América–RN	Recife
21:00 (UTC-3)	Zé Carlos 13' (pen.), 68'	Report	Flávio Recife 77'; Rodrigo Dantas 89'	Stadium: Estádio Eládio de Barros Carvalho (Aflitos)

1 June 2010 6	São Caetano	5–0	Náutico	São Caetano do Sul
19:30 (UTC-3)	Artur 1'; Kleber 3'; Eduardo 17', 57', 90'	Report		Stadium: Estádio Anacleto Campanella; Attendance: 509; Referee: Felipe Gomes da Silva

29 May 2010 7	Náutico	2–0	Ipatinga	Recife
16:10 (UTC-3)	Bruno Meneghel 62', 82'	Report		Stadium: Estádio Eládio de Barros Carvalho (Aflitos); Attendance: 9,402; Referee: Jailson Macedo de Freitas

13 July 2010 8	Náutico	2–1	ASA	Recife
21:50 (UTC-3)	Cristiano 42'; Zé Carlos 90+1'	Report	Júnior Viçosa 62'	Stadium: Estádio Eládio de Barros Carvalho (Aflitos); Referee: Wladyerisson Oliveira

17 July 2010 9	América–MG	1–2	Náutico	Sete Lagoas
16:10 (UTC-3)	Thiago Silvy 45+1'	Report	Thiaguinho 32'; Zé Carlos 43'	Stadium: Estádio Joaquim Henrique Nogueira (Arena do Jacaré); Referee: Rodrigo Nunes de Sá

24 July 2010 10	Náutico	3–2	Bahia	Recife
16:10 (UTC-3)	Giovanni 31'; Geílson 34'; Cristiano 45+2'	Report	Vander 20'; Ávine 51'	Stadium: Estádio Eládio de Barros Carvalho (Aflitos); Referee: André Luiz de Freitas Castro

31 July 2010 11	Paraná	4–0	Náutico	Curitiba
16:10 (UTC-3)	Marcelo Toscano 11'; Leandro Bocão 29'; Vinícius 33'; Juninho 77' (pen.)	Report		Stadium: Estádio Durival Britto e Silva (Vila Capanema); Attendance: 6,246; Referee: Wallace Nascimento Valente

7 August 2010 12	Náutico	1–1	Sport	Recife
16:10 (UTC-3)	Élton 13'	Report	Ciro 4'	Stadium: Estádio Eládio de Barros Carvalho (Aflitos); Referee: Cláudio Mercante

10 August 2010 13	Guaratinguetá	1–0	Náutico	Guaratinguetá
19:30 (UTC-3)	Vágner Carioca 90+1'	Report		Stadium: Estádio Municipal Professor Dario Rodrigues Leite (Ninho da Garça); Attendance: 1,773; Referee: José de Caldas Souza

14 August 2010 14	Náutico	1–0	Portuguesa	Recife
16:10 (UTC-3)	Francismar 76'	Report		Stadium: Estádio Eládio de Barros Carvalho (Aflitos); Referee: Ricardo Marques Ribeiro

21 August 2010 15	Icasa	3–1	Náutico	Juazeiro do Norte
15:50 (UTC-3)	Júnior Xuxa 47'; Carlinhos 50'; Assisinho 61'	Report	Rodrigo Pontes 78'	Stadium: Estádio Mauro Sampaio (Romeirão); Referee: Sandro Meira Ricci

24 August 2010 16	Ponte Preta	2–0	Náutico	Campinas
21:00 (UTC-3)	Leandro 21'; Reis 35'	Report		Stadium: Estádio Moisés Lucarelli; Attendance: 7,950; Referee: Alício Pena Júnior

27 August 2010 17	Náutico	0–0	Brasiliense	Recife
21:00 (UTC-3)		Report		Stadium: Estádio Eládio de Barros Carvalho (Aflitos); Referee: Wagner Reway

31 August 2010 18	Vila Nova	2–1	Náutico	Goiânia
19:30 (UTC-3)	Rôni 32'; David 75'	Report	Francismar 47'	Stadium: Estádio do Governo do Estado de Goiás (Serra Dourada); Referee: Andrey da Silva e Silva

3 September 2010 19	Náutico	1–0	Santo André	Recife
21:00 (UTC-3)	Bruno Veiga 64'	Report		Stadium: Estádio Eládio de Barros Carvalho (Aflitos); Referee: Pericles Bassols Pegado Cortez

7 September 2010 20	Coritiba	3–1	Náutico	Joinville
21:00 (UTC-3)	Jeci 5'; Rafinha 54' (pen.); Denis 69'	Report	Geílson 44' (pen.)	Stadium: Arena Joinville; Attendance: 2,624; Referee: Márcio Chagas da Silva

10 September 2010 21	Náutico	0–2	Duque de Caxias	Recife
21:00 (UTC-3)		Report	Leandro Chaves 65', 73'	Stadium: Estádio Eládio de Barros Carvalho (Aflitos); Referee: Italo Medeiros de Azevedo

18 September 2010 22	Bragantino	3–0	Náutico	Bragança Paulista
15:50 (UTC-3)	Marcelinho 3'; Rodriguinho 18'; João Sales 58'	Report		Stadium: Estádio Nabi Abi Chedid; Attendance: 780; Referee: Edivaldo Elias da Silva

21 September 2010 23	Náutico	1–0	Figueirense	Recife
21:00 (UTC-3)	Zé Carlos 32' (pen.)	Report		Stadium: Estádio Eládio de Barros Carvalho (Aflitos); Referee: Marcelo de Lima Henrique

25 September 2010 24	América–RN	2–1	Náutico	Natal
15:50 (UTC-3)	Marcelo Braz 6'; Washington 14'	Report	Zé Carlos 39' (pen.)	Stadium: Estádio Dr. João Cláudio Vasconcelos Machado (Machadão)

28 September 2010 25	Náutico	1–2	São Caetano	Recife
19:00 (UTC-3)	Giovanni 35'	Report	Eduardo 31'; Ailton 40'	Stadium: Estádio Eládio de Barros Carvalho (Aflitos); Referee: Paulo Brandão Figueira

2 October 2010 26	Ipatinga	2–1	Náutico	Ipatinga
16:00 (UTC-3)	Rodrigo Antônio 32'; Fabiano 59'	Report	Max 23'	Stadium: Estádio Municipal João Lamego Netto (Ipatingão); Referee: Jean Pierre Gonçalves Lima

5 October 2010 27	ASA	2–0	Náutico	Arapiraca
21:00 (UTC-3)	Ciel 22'; João Victor 72'	Report		Stadium: Estádio Municipal Coaracy da Mata Fonseca; Attendance: 5,640; Referee: Elmo Alves Resende Cunha

12 October 2010 28	Náutico	2–1	América–MG	Recife
21:00 (UTC-3)	Joélson 39'; Geílson 60'	Report	Jandson 78'	Stadium: Estádio Eládio de Barros Carvalho (Aflitos); Referee: João Batista de Arruda

16 October 2010 29	Bahia	3–0	Náutico	Salvador
16:00 (UTC-3)	Adriano 24', 38', 48'	Report		Stadium: Estádio Governador Roberto Santos (Pituaçu); Attendance: 27,116; Referee: Wilton Pereira Sampaio

19 October 2010 30	Náutico	1–4	Paraná	Recife
21:50 (UTC-3)	Ramirez 59'	Report	Wanderson 6'; Rodrigo Pimpão 8', 23'; Somália 83'	Stadium: Estádio Eládio de Barros Carvalho (Aflitos); Referee: Antonio Rogerio Batista do Prado

23 October 2010 31	Sport	1–1	Náutico	Recife
17:00 (UTC-3)	Romerito 71'	Report	Bruno Meneghel 47'	Stadium: Estádio Adelmar da Costa Carvalho (Ilha do Retiro); Referee: Niélson Nogueira Dias

29 October 2010 32	Náutico	0–1	Guaratinguetá	Recife
21:00 (UTC-3)		Report	Jhon 66'	Stadium: Estádio Eládio de Barros Carvalho (Aflitos); Referee: Edmar Campos da Encarnação

2 November 2010 33	Portuguesa	3–1	Náutico	São Paulo
21:00 (UTC-3)	Glauber 61'; Héverton 62'; Ademir Sopa 78'	Report	Geílson 28'	Stadium: Estádio Municipal Paulo Machado de Carvalho (Pacaembu); Attendance: 748

6 November 2010 34	Náutico	1–0	Icasa	Recife
17:00 (UTC-3)	Walter 43'	Report		Stadium: Estádio Eládio de Barros Carvalho (Aflitos); Referee: Leandro Pedro Vuaden

9 November 2010 35	Náutico	1–1	Ponte Preta	Recife
21:50 (UTC-3)	Bruno Meneghel 21' (pen.)	Report	Bruno Collaço 10'	Stadium: Estádio Eládio de Barros Carvalho (Aflitos)

13 November 2010 36	Brasiliense	0–1	Náutico	Taguatinga
17:00 (UTC-3)		Report	43'	Stadium: Elmo Serejo Farias Stadium (Boca do Jacaré); Referee: Djalma Beltrami

20 November 2010 37	Náutico	4–1	Vila Nova	Recife
17:00 (UTC-3)	Geílson 53', 81'; Bruno Meneghel 70'; Cristiano 85'	Report	David 36'	Stadium: Estádio Eládio de Barros Carvalho (Aflitos)

26 November 2010 38	Santo André	1–0	Náutico	Santo André
21:00 (UTC-3)	Borebi 90'	Report		Stadium: Estádio Municipal Bruno José Daniel; Referee: Manoel Paixão dos Santos

==== Record ====
Final Position	Points	Matches	Wins	Draws	Losses	Goals For	Goals Away	Avg%
13th	48	38	14	6	18	41	60	42%
