= 2011 Clube Náutico Capibaribe season =

Náutico
2011 season
- Chairman: Berillo Júnior
- Manager: Roberto Fernandes; Waldemar Lemos
- Stadium: Estádio dos Aflitos
- Série B: Runners-up
- Pernambucano: Semi-finals
- Copa do Brasil: Round of 16
- Top goalscorer: League: Kieza (21); All: Kieza (27)
Home colours	Away colours	Third colours

The 2011 season was Náutico's 111th season in the club's history. Náutico competed in the Campeonato Pernambucano, Copa do Brasil and Série B.

== Squad ==
Note: Flags indicate national team as defined under FIFA eligibility rules; some limited exceptions apply. Players may hold more than one non-FIFA nationality.

No.	Pos.	Nation	Player
—	GK	BRA	Glédson
—	GK	BRA	Gideão
—	GK	BRA	Rodrigo Carvalho
—	DF	BRA	Diego Bispo
—	DF	BRA	Walter
—	DF	BRA	Rodrigo Heffner
—	DF	BRA	Marlon
—	DF	BRA	Jeff Silva
—	DF	BRA	Peter
—	DF	BRA	Wescley
—	DF	BRA	Ronaldo Alves
—	DF	BRA	Airton
—	DF	BRA	Jorge Fellipe
—	DF	BRA	Neno
—	DF	BRA	Alex Fraga
—	MF	BRA	Ramirez

No.	Pos.	Nation	Player
—	MF	BRA	Lismar
—	MF	BRA	Elicarlos
—	MF	BRA	Douglas
—	MF	BRA	Helder
—	MF	BRA	Derley
—	MF	BRA	Éverton
—	MF	BRA	Elton
—	MF	BRA	William
—	MF	BRA	Eduardo Ramos
—	FW	BRA	Bruno Meneghel
—	FW	BRA	Ricardo Xavier
—	FW	BRA	Rogério
—	FW	BRA	Kieza
—	FW	BRA	Joélson
—	FW	BRA	Alexandro
—	FW	BRA	Piauí

== Statistics ==
=== Overall ===
Games played	67 (24 Pernambucano, 5 Copa do Brasil, 38 Série B)
Games won	34 (15 Pernambucano, 2 Copa do Brasil, 17 Série B)
Games drawn	19 (5 Pernambucano, 1 Copa do Brasil, 13 Série B)
Games lost	14 (4 Pernambucano, 2 Copa do Brasil, 8 Série B)
Goals scored	112
Goals conceded	76
Goal difference	+36
Best results (goal difference)	6–0 (H) v Trem – Copa do Brasil – 2011.03.03
Worst result (goal difference)	0–4 (A) v Portuguesa – Série B – 2011.05.21
Top scorer	Kieza (27)

Source: Náutico official website

=== Goalscorers ===
Place	Pos.	Nat.	No.	Name	Campeonato Pernambucano	Copa do Brasil	Série B	Total
1	FW	(Brazil)		Kieza	5	1	21	27
2	MF	(Brazil)		Eduardo Ramos	6	2	5	13
3	FW	(Brazil)		Bruno Meneghel	8	2	0	10
4	MF	(Brazil)		Derley	2	0	7	9
4	FW	(Brazil)		Ricardo Xavier	8	1	0	9
5	FW	(Brazil)		Rogério	2	0	6	8
6	DF	(Brazil)		Everton Luiz	7	0	0	7
7	DF	(Brazil)		Marlon	0	0	4	4
7	DF	(Brazil)		Peter	1	0	3	4
8	DF	(Brazil)		Aírton	1	2	0	3
8	MF	(Brazil)		Elicarlos	0	0	3	3
8	MF	(Brazil)		William	3	0	0	3
9	MF	(Brazil)		Deyvid Sacconi	1	1	0	2
9	FW	(Brazil)		Geílson	2	0	0	2
9	DF	(Brazil)		Jorge Fellipe	2	0	0	2
10	FW	(Brazil)		Daniel Caiçara	1	0	0	1
10	DF	(Brazil)		Lenon	0	0	1	1
10	MF	(Brazil)		Rodolfo Potiguar	1	0	0	1
10	DF	(Brazil)		Ronaldo Alves	0	0	1	1
10	FW	(Brazil)		Silas	1	0	0	1
10	DF	(Brazil)		Walter	1	0	0	1
				Total	52	9	51	112

== Competitions ==
=== Campeonato Pernambucano ===
==== First stage ====
13 January 2011 1	Náutico	3–0	Petrolina	Recife
21:30 (UTC-3)	Walter 37'; Geílson 50', 52'	Report		Stadium: Estádio Eládio de Barros Carvalho (Aflitos); Attendance: 9,579; Referee: Nielson Nogueira Dias

16 January 2011 2	Araripina	1–1	Náutico	Araripina
16:00 (UTC-3)	Cristovão 35'	Report	Daniel Caiçara 42'	Stadium: Estádio Gilson Tiburtino de Souza (Chapadão do Araripe); Attendance: 5,296; Referee: Emerson Sobral

19 January 2011 3	Salgueiro	1–0	Náutico	Salgueiro
21:00 (UTC-3)	Hugo Henrique 65'	Report		Stadium: Estádio Cornélio de Barros (Salgueirão); Attendance: 4,473; Referee: Antônio Hora Filho

21 January 2011 4	Náutico	1–1	Cabense	Recife
21:00 (UTC-3)	Everton Luiz 55'	Report	Rosivaldo 40'	Stadium: Estádio Eládio de Barros Carvalho (Aflitos); Attendance: 9,880; Referee: Ricardo Tavares

24 January 2011 5	Náutico	4–1	Porto	Recife
20:00 (UTC-3)	Ricardo Xavier 20', 34'; Eduardo Ramos 23'; Rodolfo Potiguar 41'	Report	Lalá 61'	Stadium: Estádio Eládio de Barros Carvalho (Aflitos); Attendance: 13,002; Referee: Gilberto Castro Júnior

27 January 2011 6	Vitória das Tabocas	0–1	Náutico	Vitória de Santo Antão
20:00 (UTC-3)		Report	Rogério 17'	Stadium: Estádio Municipal Severino Cândido Carneiro (Carneirão); Attendance: 6,294; Referee: Gleydson Leite

30 January 2011 7	Náutico	3–1	Santa Cruz	Recife
16:00 (UTC-3)	Ricardo Xavier 14'; Derley 70'; Bruno Meneghel 79' (pen.)	Report	Thiago Cunha 4'	Stadium: Estádio Eládio de Barros Carvalho (Aflitos); Attendance: 18,112; Referee: Nielson Nogueira Dias

2 February 2011 8	Náutico	2–1	Ypiranga	Recife
20:00 (UTC-3)	William 15'; Bruno Meneghel 62'	Report	Renato 32'	Stadium: Estádio Eládio de Barros Carvalho (Aflitos); Attendance: 10,033; Referee: Carlos Costa

6 February 2011 9	Central	0–0	Náutico	Caruaru
16:00 (UTC-3)		Report		Stadium: Estádio Luiz José de Lacerda (Lacerdão); Attendance: 10,824; Referee: Antônio Hora Filho

9 February 2011 10	Náutico	2–1	América–PE	Recife
20:00 (UTC-3)	Everton Luiz 55', 67'	Report	Silvano 13'	Stadium: Estádio Eládio de Barros Carvalho (Aflitos); Attendance: 10,735; Referee: Gilberto Castro Júnior

13 February 2011 11	Sport	1–1	Náutico	Recife
16:00 (UTC-3)	Alessandro 49' (pen.)	Report	Ricardo Xavier 45'	Stadium: Estádio Adelmar da Costa Carvalho (Ilha do Retiro); Attendance: 26,574; Referee: Antonio Hora Filho

16 February 2011 12	Petrolina	0–1	Náutico	Petrolina
21:00 (UTC-3)		Report	Kieza 87'	Stadium: Estádio Paulo de Souza Coelho; Attendance: 4,935; Referee: Emerson Sobral

19 February 2011 13	Náutico	2–1	Araripina	Recife
16:00 (UTC-3)	Everton Luiz 15'; Bruno Meneghel 19'	Report	Misael 77'	Stadium: Estádio Eládio de Barros Carvalho (Aflitos); Attendance: 12,667; Referee: Eduardo Alcântara

27 February 2011 14	Cabense	1–4	Náutico	Cabo de Santo Agostinho
16:00 (UTC-3)	Buiú 83'	Report	Everton Luiz 11'; Aírton 27'; Ricardo Xavier 67'; Silas 85'	Stadium: Estádio Gileno de Carli; Attendance: 4,845; Referee: Ricardo Tavares

10 March 2011 15	Náutico	4–2	Vitória das Tabocas	Recife
21:30 (UTC-3)	Eduardo Ramos 19'; Bruno Meneghel 23'; Kieza 27'; Jorge Fellipe 82'	Report	Cleyton 44'; Nando 73'	Stadium: Estádio Eládio de Barros Carvalho (Aflitos); Attendance: 13,148; Referee: Gilberto Jr

13 March 2011 16	Porto	2–1	Náutico	Caruaru
16:00 (UTC-3)	Thiago Laranjeira 30'; Jefferson Renan 85'	Report	Kieza 9'	Stadium: Estádio Luiz José de Lacerda (Lacerdão); Attendance: 5,267; Referee: Sebastião Rufino Filho

20 March 2011 17	Santa Cruz	3–3	Náutico	Recife
16:00 (UTC-3)	Landu 10'; Weslley 12'; Thiago Matias 40'	Report	Eduardo Ramos 28'; Ricardo Xavier 17'	Stadium: Estádio José do Rego Maciel (Arruda); Attendance: 33,208; Referee: Emerson Sobral

23 March 2011 18	Náutico	5–1	Salgueiro	Recife
20:00 (UTC-3)	Bruno Meneghel 12' (pen.), 55'; Ricardo Xavier 34', 59'; Deyvid Sacconi 66'	Report	Eridon 78'	Stadium: Estádio Eládio de Barros Carvalho (Aflitos); Attendance: 13,410; Referee: Ricardo Tavares

27 March 2011 19	Ypiranga	0–3	Náutico	Santa Cruz do Capibaribe
16:00 (UTC-3)		Report	Everton Luiz 5'; Derley 12'; William 74'	Stadium: Estádio Otávio Limeira Alves; Attendance: 4,452; Referee: Sebastião Rufino Filho

2 April 2011 20	Náutico	4–3	Central	Recife
20:00 (UTC-3)	Eduardo Ramos 9', 42'; Jorge Fellipe 61'; Bruno Meneghel 70'	Report	Wilson Surubim 22'; Marcinho 55'; Roma 84'	Stadium: Estádio Eládio de Barros Carvalho (Aflitos); Attendance: 14,593; Referee: Carlos Costa

10 April 2011 21	América–PE	4–2	Náutico	Paulista
16:00 (UTC-3)	Silvano 41', 71'; Rafael Nitsche 55' (o.g.); Branquinho 63'	Report	William 19'; Peter 53' (pen.)	Stadium: Estádio Ademir Cunha; Referee: Emerson Sobral

17 April 2011 22	Náutico	1–0	Sport	Recife
16:00 (UTC-3)	Bruno Meneghel 62'	Report		Stadium: Estádio Eládio de Barros Carvalho (Aflitos); Attendance: 12,287; Referee: Sebastião Rufino Filho

==== Semi-finals ====
24 April 2011	Sport	3–1	Náutico	Recife
16:00 (UTC-3)	Bruno Mineiro 26'; Marcelinho Paraíba 45+1'; Ciro 88'	Report	Rogério 81'	Stadium: Estádio Adelmar da Costa Carvalho (Ilha do Retiro); Attendance: 23,601; Referee: Cláudio Mercante

1 May 2011	Náutico	3–2	Sport	Recife
16:00 (UTC-3)	Kieza 18', 79'; Everton Luiz 65'	Report	Carlinhos Bala 25'; Bruno Mineiro 62'	Stadium: Estádio Eládio de Barros Carvalho (Aflitos); Attendance: 18,128; Referee: Sálvio Spínola

==== Record ====
Final Position	Points	Matches	Wins	Draws	Losses	Goals For	Goals Away	Avg%
3rd	50	24	15	5	4	52	30	69%

=== Copa do Brasil ===
==== First round ====
23 February 2011	Trem	2–1	Náutico	Macapá
21:00 (UTC-3)	Lensandro 73'; Ari 90+3'	Report	Airton 75'	Stadium: Estádio Municipal Glicério de Souza Marques (Glicerão); Attendance: 1,005; Referee: Dewson Fernando Freitas da Silva

3 March 2011	Náutico	6–0	Trem	Recife
19:30 (UTC-3)	Bruno Meneghel 12', 35'; Airton 16'; Ricardo Xavier 49'; Kieza 56'; Deyvid Sacconi 76'	Report		Stadium: Estádio Eládio de Barros Carvalho (Aflitos); Attendance: 11,073; Referee: José Renato Albuquerque Soares

==== Second round ====
16 March 2011	Bangu	0–2	Náutico	Rio de Janeiro
21:50 (UTC-3)		Report	Eduardo Ramos 49', 90'	Stadium: Estádio Proletário Guilherme da Silveira (Moça Bonita); Attendance: 136; Referee: Cléber Welington Abade

==== Round of 16 ====
13 April 2011	Náutico	0–3	Vasco da Gama	Recife
21:50 (UTC-3)		Report	Dedé 32'; Alecsandro 51'; Bernardo 90+2'	Stadium: Estádio Eládio de Barros Carvalho (Aflitos); Attendance: 12,244; Referee: Celio Amorim

27 April 2011	Vasco da Gama	0–0	Náutico	Rio de Janeiro
21:50 (UTC-3)		Report		Stadium: Estádio Vasco da Gama (São Januário); Attendance: 5,557; Referee: Devarly Lira do Rosario

==== Record ====
Final Position	Points	Matches	Wins	Draws	Losses	Goals For	Goals Away	Avg%
13th	7	5	2	1	2	9	5	46%

=== Série B ===
21 May 2011 1	Portuguesa	4–0	Náutico	São Paulo
16:20 (UTC-3)	Ananias 3'; Wescley 48' (o.g.); Guilherme 52'; Henrique 61'	Report		Stadium: Estádio Oswaldo Teixeira Duarte (Canindé); Attendance: 2,243; Referee: Cláudio Lima e Silva

28 May 2011 2	Náutico	1–0	Goiás	Recife
16:20 (UTC-3)	Eduardo Ramos 47'	Report		Stadium: Estádio Eládio de Barros Carvalho (Aflitos); Attendance: 3,959; Referee: Arílson Bispo da Anunciação

4 June 2011 3	Criciúma	0–0	Náutico	Criciúma
16:20 (UTC-3)		Report		Stadium: Estádio Heriberto Hülse; Attendance: 6,853; Referee: Edivaldo Elias da Silva

11 June 2011 4	Náutico	2–2	Bragantino	Recife
16:20 (UTC-3)	Rogério 1'; Kieza 51'	Report	Juninho Quixadá 66'; Bruno Gaúcho 90'	Stadium: Estádio Eládio de Barros Carvalho (Aflitos); Attendance: 5,022

14 June 2011 5	Salgueiro	0–2	Náutico	Paulista
19:30 (UTC-3)		Report	Kieza 60'; Eduardo Ramos 73' (pen.)	Stadium: Estádio Ademir Cunha; Attendance: 10,066; Referee: Wilton Pereira de Sampaio

18 June 2011 6	Náutico	1–1	Paraná	Recife
16:20 (UTC-3)	Peter 71' (pen.)	Report	Serginho 49'	Stadium: Estádio Eládio de Barros Carvalho (Aflitos); Attendance: 6,051; Referee: Eduardo de Aquino

25 June 2011 7	ABC	1–0	Náutico	Natal
16:20 (UTC-3)	Leandrão 34'	Report		Stadium: Estádio Maria Lamas Farache (Frasqueirão); Attendance: 7,809; Referee: Francisco Assis Almeida Filho

28 June 2011 8	Duque de Caxias	0–0	Náutico	Macaé
19:30 (UTC-3)		Report		Stadium: Estádio Cláudio Moacir de Azevedo (Moacyrzão); Attendance: 212; Referee: Renato Cardoso da Conceição

2 July 2011 9	Náutico	2–0	Guarani	Recife
16:20 (UTC-3)	Derley 7'; Kieza 55'	Report		Stadium: Estádio Eládio de Barros Carvalho (Aflitos); Attendance: 4,223; Referee: Gleidson Santos Oliveira

9 July 2011 10	Icasa	1–2	Náutico	Juazeiro do Norte
21:00 (UTC-3)	Fábio Lopes 19'	Report	Ronaldo Alves 58'; Rogério 70'	Stadium: Estádio Mauro Sampaio (Romeirão); Attendance: 2,427; Referee: Diego Pombo Lopes

12 July 2011 11	Náutico	3–2	Americana	Recife
21:00 (UTC-3)	Kieza 18', 31', 72'	Report	Marcinho 16'; Léo Silva 33' (pen.)	Stadium: Estádio Eládio de Barros Carvalho (Aflitos); Attendance: 3,226; Referee: Celio Amorim

23 July 2011 12	Vila Nova	0–0	Náutico	Goiânia
16:20 (UTC-3)		Report		Stadium: Estádio do Governo do Estado de Goiás (Serra Dourada); Attendance: 8,971; Referee: Emerson de Almeida Ferreira

26 July 2011 13	Náutico	2–0	Vitória	Recife
21:50 (UTC-3)	Kieza 23', 64' (pen.)	Report		Stadium: Estádio Eládio de Barros Carvalho (Aflitos); Attendance: 13,395; Referee: Sandro Meira Ricci

5 August 2011 15	Náutico	1–0	ASA	Recife
21:00 (UTC-3)	Derley 55'	Report		Stadium: Estádio Eládio de Barros Carvalho (Aflitos); Attendance: 16,051; Referee: Marcos Mateus Pereira

9 August 2011 14*	Sport	2–0	Náutico	Recife
21:00 (UTC-3)	Marcelinho Paraíba 59'; Maylson 80'	Report		Stadium: Estádio Adelmar da Costa Carvalho (Ilha do Retiro); Attendance: 19,028; Referee: Heber Roberto Lopes

13 August 2011 16	Barueri	0–0	Náutico	Barueri
16:20 (UTC-3)		Report		Stadium: Arena Barueri; Attendance: 11,847; Referee: Devarly Lira do Rosario

16 August 2011 17	Náutico	2–1	São Caetano	Recife
21:50 (UTC-3)	Rogério 27'; Kieza 76' (pen.)	Report	Luciano Mandi 36'	Stadium: Estádio Eládio de Barros Carvalho (Aflitos); Attendance: 13,125; Referee: Elmo Alves Rezende

19 August 2011 18	Náutico	3–1	Boa Esporte	Recife
20:30 (UTC-3)	Kieza 11', 71' (pen.); Elicarlos 55'	Report	Jheimy 76'	Stadium: Estádio Eládio de Barros Carvalho (Aflitos); Attendance: 15,782; Referee: José Caldas de Souza

27 August 2011 19	Ponte Preta	3–3	Náutico	Araraquara
16:20 (UTC-3)	Lúcio Flávio 17'; Renato Cajá 71'; Guilherme 78'	Report	Elicarlos 30'; Rogério 42'; Eduardo Ramos 63'	Stadium: Estádio Dr. Adhemar de Barros (Fonte Luminosa); Referee: Leandro Vuaden

30 August 2011 20	Náutico	0–0	Portuguesa	Recife
20:30 (UTC-3)		Report		Stadium: Estádio Eládio de Barros Carvalho (Aflitos); Attendance: 16,548; Referee: Gutemberg Fonseca

2 September 2011 21	Goiás	1–2	Náutico	Goiânia
20:30 (UTC-3)	Iarley 90+1'	Report	Kieza 58'; Eduardo Ramos 67'	Stadium: Estádio do Governo do Estado de Goiás (Serra Dourada); Attendance: 6,035; Referee: Ricardo Marques Ribeiro

10 September 2011 22	Náutico	2–1	Criciúma	Recife
16:20 (UTC-3)	Kieza 43'; Peter 70'	Report	Rogélio 90+7'	Stadium: Estádio Eládio de Barros Carvalho (Aflitos); Attendance: 16,325; Referee: Jean Pierre Gonça

13 September 2011 23	Bragantino	2–1	Náutico	Bragança Paulista
20:30 (UTC-3)	Léo Jaime 1'; Lincom 24'	Report	Marlon 80'	Stadium: Estádio Nabi Abi Chedid; Attendance: 2,958; Referee: Wagner Rosa

17 September 2011 24	Náutico	1–0	Salgueiro	Recife
16:20 (UTC-3)	Derley 71'	Report		Stadium: Estádio Eládio de Barros Carvalho (Aflitos); Attendance: 15,007; Referee: Cláudio Mercante

23 September 2011 25	Paraná	2–0	Náutico	Curitiba
20:30 (UTC-3)	Itaqui 6'; Dinélson 57'	Report		Stadium: Estádio Durival Britto e Silva (Vila Capanema); Attendance: 1,675; Referee: José de Caldas Souza

27 September 2011 26	Náutico	2–0	ABC	Recife
20:30 (UTC-3)	Kieza 39'; Marlon 64'	Report		Stadium: Estádio Eládio de Barros Carvalho (Aflitos); Attendance: 14,101; Referee: Francisco Alves do Nascimento

30 September 2011 27	Náutico	1–1	Duque de Caxias	Recife
20:30 (UTC-3)	Kieza 72'	Report	Júlio César 90'	Stadium: Estádio Eládio de Barros Carvalho (Aflitos); Referee: Márcio Brum Coruja

4 October 2011 28	Guarani	3–1	Náutico	Campinas
20:30 (UTC-3)	Marcelo Macedo 54', 60'; Felipe 75'	Report	Kieza 36'	Stadium: Estádio Brinco de Ouro da Princesa

8 October 2011 29	Náutico	2–2	Icasa	Recife
16:20 (UTC-3)	Kieza 1', 35' (pen.)	Report	Osmar 36'; Alex Afonso 80'	Stadium: Estádio Eládio de Barros Carvalho (Aflitos); Attendance: 14,049; Referee: Vinícius da Costa Rocha

11 October 2011 30	Americana	0–0	Náutico	Americana
20:30 (UTC-3)		Report		Stadium: Estádio Eládio de Barros Carvalho (Aflitos); Attendance: 1,763; Referee: André Luiz de Freitas Castro

18 October 2011 31	Náutico	4–2	Vila Nova	Recife
21:00 (UTC-3)	Peter 24'; Eduardo Ramos 26'; Derley 42', 79'	Report	Rôni 11'; Betinho 50'	Stadium: Estádio Eládio de Barros Carvalho (Aflitos); Attendance: 13,554

22 October 2011 32	Vitória	3–2	Náutico	Salvador
16:20 (UTC-3)	Fábio Santos 21'; Marquinhos 58', 63'	Report	Rogério 51', 87'	Stadium: Estádio Manoel Barradas (Barradão); Attendance: 6,119; Referee: Marcelo de Lima Henrique

29 October 2011 33	Náutico	2–0	Sport	Recife
16:20 (UTC-3)	Marlon 23'; Elicarlos 30'	Report		Stadium: Estádio Eládio de Barros Carvalho (Aflitos); Attendance: 17,164; Referee: Gutemberg de Paula Fonseca

5 November 2011 34	ASA	1–2	Náutico	Arapiraca
17:00 (UTC-3)	Reinaldo Alagoano 86'	Report	Kieza 31'; Derley 80'	Stadium: Estádio Municipal Coaracy da Mata Fonseca; Referee: Fabrício Neves Correa

8 November 2011 35	Náutico	2–1	Barueri	Recife
20:30 (UTC-3)	Derley 46'; Kieza 57'	Report	Marcelinho 20'	Stadium: Estádio Eládio de Barros Carvalho (Aflitos); Attendance: 19,764; Referee: Francisco Assis Almeida Filho

12 November 2011 36	São Caetano	0–0	Náutico	São Caetano do Sul
17:00 (UTC-3)		Report		Stadium: Estádio Anacleto Campanella; Attendance: 1,065; Referee: Evandro Rogério Roman

19 November 2011 37	Boa Esporte	2–1	Náutico	Varginha
17:00 (UTC-3)	Valdo 15'; Marques 86'	Report	Kieza 21'	Stadium: Estádio Municipal Prefeito Dilson Luiz de Melo (Melão); Referee: Felipe Duarte Varejão

26 November 2011 38	Náutico	2–2	Ponte Preta	Recife
17:00 (UTC-3)	Marlon 30'; Lenon 65'	Report	Ricardo Jesus 17'; Gérson 90+3'	Stadium: Estádio Eládio de Barros Carvalho (Aflitos); Attendance: 19,795; Referee: Reginaldo Gomes da Silva

==== Record ====
Final Position	Points	Matches	Wins	Draws	Losses	Goals For	Goals Away	Avg%
2nd	64	38	17	13	8	51	41	56%
