= Derley =

Derley may refer to:

- Derley (footballer, born 1986), Wanderley de Jesus Sousa, Brazilian football midfielder
- Derley (footballer, born 1987), Vanderley Dias Marinho, Brazilian football forward

== See also ==
- Derlei, Vanderlei Fernandes Silva (born 1975), Brazilian football striker
