= Irineu (footballer) =

Brazilian footballer (born 1983)

Personal information
- Full name: Irineu Calixto Couto
- Date of birth: 27 March 1983 (age 43)
- Place of birth: São Paulo, Brazil
- Height: 1.86 m (6 ft 1 in)
- Position: Centre-back

Youth career
- –2001: Cruzeiro

Senior career*
Years	Team	Apps	(Gls)
2001–2008	Cruzeiro	23	(1)
2005	→ Ipatinga (loan)	0	(0)
2006	→ Ipatinga (loan)	0	(0)
2006	→ Braga (loan)	6	(0)
2007	→ Flamengo (loan)	10	(1)
2007	→ Marília (loan)	17	(0)
2008	→ Académica (loan)	19	(0)
2008–2009	Denizlispor	22	(0)
2009	Juventude	20	(2)
2010	Paraná	26	(2)
2011	ABC	13	(0)
2012	Duque de Caxias	0	(0)
2012	ASA	2	(0)
2013	Betim		
2014	América TO		
2015	Doze		
- * Club domestic league appearances and goals

Irineu Calixto Couto (born 27 March 1983), or simply Irineu, is a Brazilian former professional footballer who played as a centre-back.

== Career ==
Born in São Paulo, Irineu started his professional career at Cruzeiro. He also loaned to Ipatinga twice, from December 2004 to April 2005 (along with Diego da Silva) and in April 2006, which he played for the club at the national cup (2005 and 2006). Originally loaned to the club until the end of year, he left for Portuguese side Sporting Braga in August 2006. He also signed a new three-year contract with Cruzeiro in July 2005. In January 2007 he returned to Brazil and loaned to Flamengo.

In August 2007 he left for Marília.

In January 2008 he was loaned to Portuguese Primeira Liga side Académica. The team avoided from relegation.

In July 2008, he signed a three-year contract with Denizlispor after his contract with Cruzeiro expired.

In September 2009 he returned to Brazil for a third time, for Juventude. After the season, he left for Paraná. In 2011, he left for newly promoted side ABC.

== Honours ==
- Brazilian Cup: 2003
- Brazilian League Série A: 2003
- Minas Gerais State League: 2003, 2004, 2006
- Rio de Janeiro State League: 2007
  - Guanabara Cup: 2007
