= Ricardo Xavier =

Brazilian footballer

Personal information
- Full name: Ricardo Gomes Xavier
- Date of birth: 22 July 1978 (age 48)
- Place of birth: Bonito, Mato Grosso do Sul, Brazil
- Height: 1.79 m (5 ft 10 in)
- Position: Forward

Senior career*
Years	Team	Apps	(Gls)
1999	Juventus		
2000	Mirassol		
2000–2003	Atlético Sorocaba		
2003	Criciúma		
2004–2006	Atlético Sorocaba		
2005	União São João		
2005	Avaí		
2006	Coyotes		
2007	Alania Vladikavkaz	11	(0)
2008	CRB		
2008–2009	Ituano		
2009–2010	Guarani	55	(17)
2011	Náutico	6	(0)
2011–2012	São Caetano	15	(5)
- * Club domestic league appearances and goals

Ricardo Gomes Xavier (born 22 July 1978) is a Brazilian former professional footballer who played as a forward.

== Career statistics ==
(Correct as of 16 October 2010)

Club	Season	State League		Brazilian Série A		Copa do Brasil		Copa Libertadores		Copa Sudamericana		Total	
Club	Season	Apps	Goals	Apps	Goals	Apps	Goals	Apps	Goals	Apps	Goals	Apps	Goals
Guarani	2010	19	11	24	3	2	0	-	-	-	-	45	14
Total		19	11	24	3	2	0	-	-	-	-	45	14
