= Grande Rio Bréscia Clube =

Bréscia Clube
- Full name: Grande Rio Bréscia Clube
- Nickname(s): Cigano
- Founded: May 1, 1982
- Ground: Estádio Manoel dos Reis, Magé, Rio de Janeiro state, Brazil
- Capacity: 5,000
- President: Nilson da Silva Gonçalves
- League: Campeonato Carioca - Série C
Home colors	Away colors

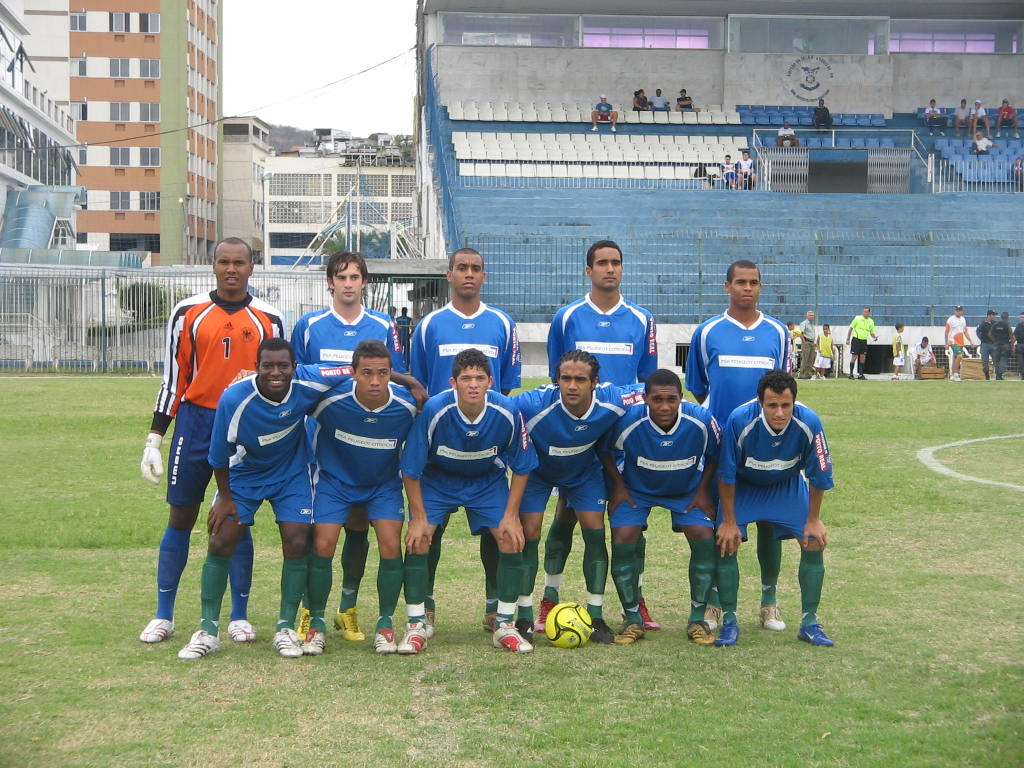
Team photo from the 2007 season

Grande Rio Bréscia Clube, commonly known as Bréscia, is a Brazilian football club based in Magé, Rio de Janeiro state. The club was formerly known as Associação Desportiva Grande Rio.

== History ==
The club was founded on May 1, 1982, as Associação Desportiva Grande Rio. After starting a partnership with Italian club Brescia Calcio in 1999, the club was renamed to Grande Rio Bréscia Clube and adopted similar logo, kits and colors. The partnership ended in 2006, after one of its supporters died, but the club kept the similar logo, kits and colors.

== Stadium ==
Grande Rio Bréscia Clube play their home games at Estádio Manoel dos Reis. The stadium has a maximum capacity of 5,000 people.
