= Rodrigo Carvalho =

Brazilian journalist and writer (born 1987)

- Born: Rodrigo Carvalho Gomes; 25 January 1987 (age 39); Niterói, Rio de Janeiro, Brazil
- Education: Pontifical Catholic University of Rio de Janeiro (B.J.)
- Occupations: journalist writer
- Years active: 2009–present
- Employer: Grupo Globo
- Works: Vivos Embaixo da Terra (2012); Tower of David (2014); Os Meninos da Caverna (2018)
- Spouse: Anne
- Relatives: Maria Beltrão (cousin)

Rodrigo Carvalho Gomes (born January 25, 1987) is a Brazilian journalist and writer. He was a reporter and currently is a foreign correspondent in London, England for Brazilian television channels GloboNews and Rede Globo. Carvalho produced the documentary Tower of David (2014), which was indicated for an International Emmy Award in 2015, and wrote two books, Vivos Embaixo da Terra (2012) and Os Meninos da Caverna (2018).

== Personal life and education ==
Born in Niterói, Rio de Janeiro, Brazil, Carvalho is the son of Angela Maria Rebel de Carvalho, a professor at a university, and Carlos Carvalho. Carvalho is the cousin of Brazilian journalist Maria Beltrão, who also works at GloboNews, as a news anchor. He is married to Anne, who is a volunteer worker at a hospital in London.

Carvalho graduated in journalism by Pontifical Catholic University of Rio de Janeiro (PUC-Rio) in 2009 and has an MBA in international relations. He was an intern at Jornal da Cidade, a newspaper from Niterói, and at Projeto Comunicar, from PUC-Rio.

In 2016, when Carvalho and his wife moved to London, they took with them a mixed breed dog named Biriba, which was adopted by Carvalho in Angra dos Reis in 2015. Biriba called the public's attention by appearing multiple times alongside Carvalho in TV reports.

== Career ==
Carvalho started his career in journalism in 2009 as a reporter of cable news channel GloboNews, and since then, he has made multiple notable coverages, such as the natural disasters in Angra dos Reis, Brazil and the San Jose Mine accident in Chile in 2010; the French presidential elections in 2017, the Wedding of Prince Harry and Meghan Markle and the Tham Luang cave rescue in Thailand in 2018, and the canonisation of Dulce de Souza Lopes Pontes in 2019.

In 2014, Carvalho produced the documentary Tower of David (Portuguese: Torre de David), which described the day-to-day life of the residents of the biggest vertical slum in the world in Caracas, Venezuela. The documentary was nominated for the International Emmy Awards Current Affairs & News in the Current Affairs category.

Since 2016, Carvalho is a foreign correspondent in London for television channels GloboNews and Rede Globo.

=== Writer ===
Carvalho wrote two nonfiction books, relating cases he followed when reporting in Chile and in Thailand. Both cases gained great international repercussion.

Vivos Embaixo da Terra (Portuguese for Alive Underground), released on 13 July 2012 by Globo Livros, tells the story of the rescue of 33 Chilean miners that got trapped for 69 days inside the San José Mine in 2010.

Os Meninos da Caverna (Portuguese for The Cave Boys), released on 21 November 2018 by the same publisher, reports on the rescue of twelve boys and their soccer trainer after they got trapped in the Tham Luang cave, in Thailand.
