= Bruno Meneghel =

Brazilian footballer (born 1987)

Personal information
- Full name: Bruno Reboli Meneghel
- Date of birth: 3 June 1987 (age 39)
- Place of birth: Vitória, Brazil
- Height: 1.68 m (5 ft 6 in)
- Position: Striker

Youth career
- 2000–2005: Vasco

Senior career*
| Years | Team | Apps | (Gls) |
| 2005–2008 | Vasco | 23 | (4) |
| 2007 | → Bréscia (loan) | 9 | (8) |
| 2008 | Bahia | 5 | (0) |
| 2009 | Resende | 15 | (11) |
| 2009 | Goiás | 17 | (2) |
| 2010–2011 | Náutico | 33 | (16) |
| 2011 | Criciúma | 6 | (0) |
| 2012 | América-MG | 14 | (5) |
| 2012–2013 | Qingdao Jonoon | 40 | (19) |
| 2014–2015 | Dalian Aerbin | 54 | (31) |
| 2016 | Cerezo Osaka | 20 | (6) |
| 2016–2017 | Changchun Yatai | 13 | (2) |
| 2018 | Albirex Niigata | 1 | (0) |
| 2018 | → Yokohama FC (loan) | 3 | (0) |
| Total | | 253 | (104) |
- * Club domestic league appearances and goals

Bruno Reboli Meneghel (born 3 June 1987 in Vitória, Espírito Santo.), or simply Bruno Meneghel, is a Brazilian football striker.

== Career ==
Bruno Meneghel began his career in the youth from Vasco and was promoted to the first team in 2005.

Before joining Bahia on 7 May 2008, he defended Bréscia, where he scored eight goals in nine Campeonato Carioca Second Level games. He joined Resende on 29 December 2008 for the 2009 season. Goiás signed striker from Resende on 15 April 2009.

== Career statistics ==
=== Club ===
Appearances and goals by club, season and competition
| Club | Season | League | | | State League | | Cup | | Continental | | Other | | Total | |
| Club | Season | Division | Apps | Goals | Apps | Goals | Apps | Goals | Apps | Goals | Apps | Goals | Apps | Goals |
|---|---|---|---|---|---|---|---|---|---|---|---|---|---|---|
| Bahia | 2008 | Série B | 5 | 0 | — | | — | | — | | — | | 5 | 0 |
| Resende | 2009 | Carioca | — | | 15 | 11 | — | | — | | — | | 15 | 11 |
| Goiás | 2009 | Série A | 17 | 2 | — | | 0 | 0 | 1 | 0 | — | | 18 | 2 |
| Náutico | 2010 | Série B | 13 | 8 | — | | 3 | 0 | — | | — | | 16 | 8 |
| Náutico | 2011 | Série B | 1 | 0 | 19 | 8 | 4 | 2 | — | | — | | 24 | 10 |
| Náutico | Total | | 14 | 8 | 19 | 8 | 7 | 2 | — | | — | | 40 | 18 |
| Criciúma | 2011 | Série B | 6 | 0 | — | | — | | — | | — | | 6 | 0 |
| América-MG | 2012 | Série B | 8 | 3 | 6 | 2 | 1 | 1 | — | | — | | 15 | 6 |
| Qingdao Jonoon | 2012 | Chinese Super League | 13 | 9 | — | | 0 | 0 | — | | — | | 13 | 9 |
| Qingdao Jonoon | 2013 | Chinese Super League | 27 | 10 | — | | 1 | 0 | — | | — | | 28 | 10 |
| Qingdao Jonoon | Total | | 40 | 19 | — | | 1 | 0 | — | | — | | 40 | 19 |
| Dalian Aerbin | 2014 | Chinese Super League | 26 | 12 | — | | 0 | 0 | — | | — | | 26 | 12 |
| Dalian Aerbin | 2015 | China League One | 28 | 19 | — | | 0 | 0 | — | | — | | 28 | 19 |
| Dalian Aerbin | Total | | 54 | 31 | — | | 0 | 0 | — | | — | | 54 | 31 |
| Cerezo Osaka | 2016 | J2 League | 20 | 6 | — | | 0 | 0 | — | | — | | 20 | 6 |
| Changchun Yatai | 2016 | Chinese Super League | 12 | 2 | — | | 0 | 0 | — | | — | | 26 | 12 |
| Changchun Yatai | 2017 | Chinese Super League | 1 | 0 | — | | 1 | 1 | — | | — | | 28 | 19 |
| Changchun Yatai | Total | | 13 | 2 | — | | 1 | 1 | — | | — | | 14 | 3 |
| Albirex Niigata | 2018 | J2 League | 1 | 0 | — | | 1 | 0 | — | | 3 | 0 | 5 | 0 |
| Yokohama FC (loan) | 2018 | J2 League | 3 | 0 | — | | — | | — | | — | | 3 | 0 |
| Career Total | | | 181 | 71 | 40 | 21 | 11 | 4 | 1 | 0 | 3 | 0 | 236 | 96 |
