= Ademir Sopa =

Brazilian footballer

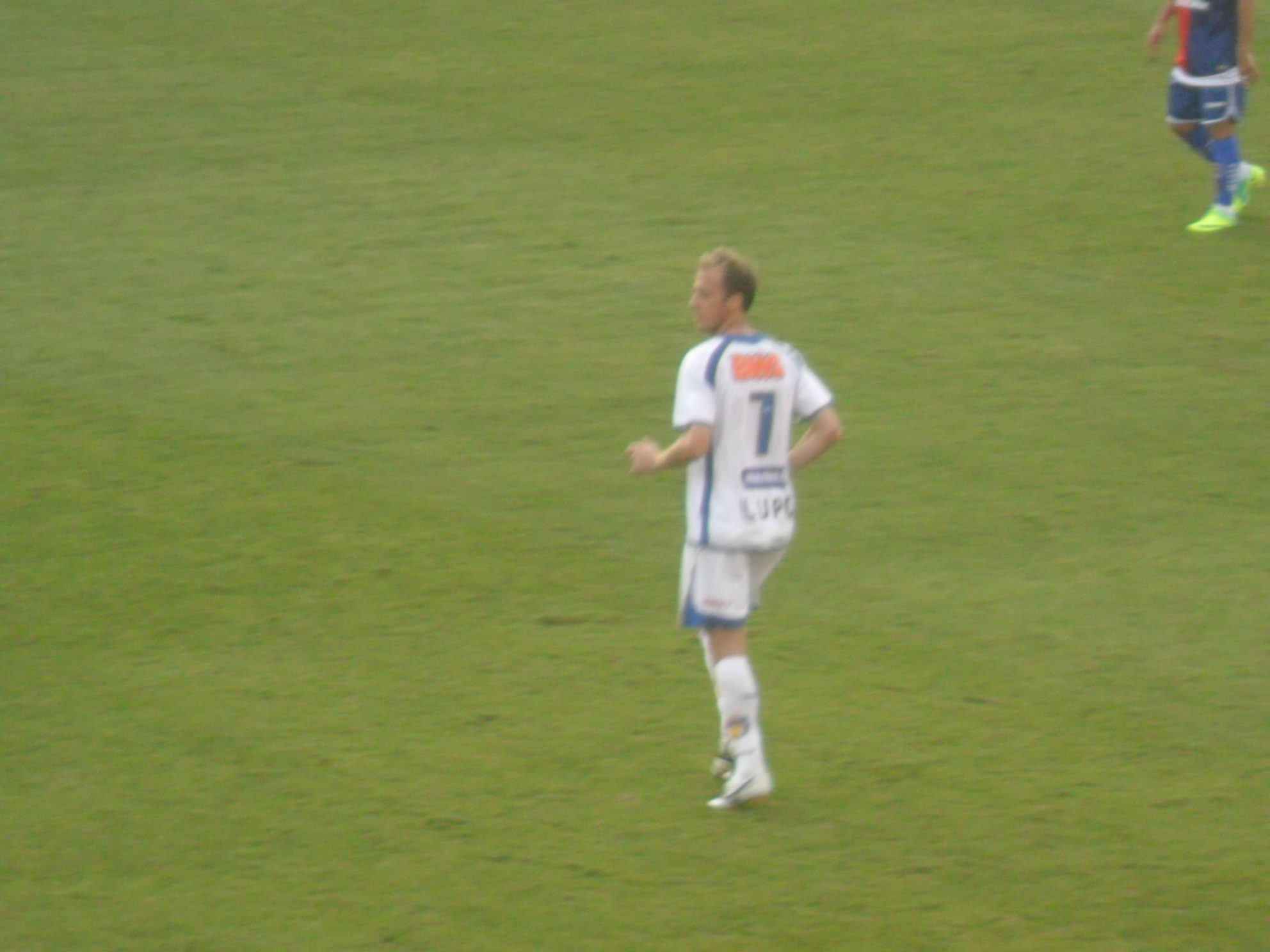
- 2011 by Lucas gc

Personal information
- Full name: Ademir Burato
- Date of birth: 23 July 1979 (age 47)
- Place of birth: São Domingos, Brazil
- Height: 1.82 m (6 ft 0 in)
- Position: Midfielder

Senior career*
Years	Team	Apps	(Gls)
2003	Mogi Mirim		
2004	Chapecoense		
2005	Caxias		
2005	União Barbarense		
2006	Juventus-SC		
2007–2009	São Caetano		
2010	Botafogo-SP		
2010–2012	Portuguesa	47	(3)
2011	→ Grêmio Barueri (loan)		
2012	→ Linense (loan)		
2012–2013	Guarani		
2014	São Luiz		
- * Club domestic league appearances and goals as of 28 November 2023

Ademir Burato (born 23 July 1979), better known as Ademir Sopa, is a Brazilian former professional footballer who played as a midfielder.

== Career ==
Versatile midfield player, Ademir Sopa gained prominence when he was part of São Caetano, state runner-up in 2007, and Portuguesa, Série B champion in 2011.

On 28 August 2010, in a match against Brasiliense, he suffered a severe shock, causing his nose to fracture in several parts.

He also had spells at Grêmio Barueri, Linense, Guarani and ended his career at EC São Luiz in 2014.

== Honours ==
Portuguesa

- Campeonato Brasileiro Série B: 2011
