= Thiaguinho (footballer, born 1990) =

Brazilian footballer

Personal information
- Full name: Thiago dos Santos Menezes
- Date of birth: 19 May 1990 (age 36)
- Place of birth: Cuiabá, Mato Grosso, Brazil
- Position: Forward

Senior career*
Years	Team	Apps	(Gls)
?–11	Náutico	?	(?)
2011	Guarani (MG)		
2012	Guarani (SP)	9	(0)
2013	Botafogo (PB)	2	(1)
2013	Itapirense		
2014	Botafogo (PB)		
2015	Icasa		
2015	Sorocaba		
2016	Comercial (SP)		
2016	Central	1	(0)
- * Club domestic league appearances and goals

Thiago dos Santos Menezes, commonly known as Thiaguinho, (born 19 May 1990) is a Brazilian footballer who plays for Olímpia Futebol Clube in Campeonato Paulista Série A3.
