= Rodrigo Dantas =

Brazilian footballer

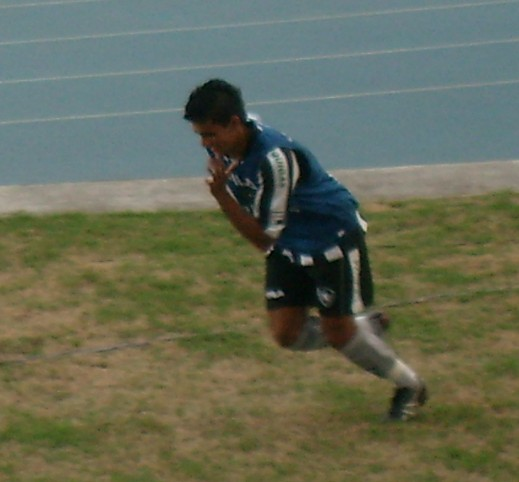
- Dantas warming up for Botafogo in 2009

Personal information
- Full name: Rodrigo Corrêa Dantas
- Date of birth: October 20, 1989 (age 37)
- Place of birth: Rio de Janeiro, Brazil
- Height: 1.82 m (6 ft 0 in)
- Position: Midfielder

Team information
- Current team: Sampaio Corrêa

Youth career
- 2006–2007: Botafogo

Senior career*
Years	Team	Apps	(Gls)
2008–2014	Botafogo	17	(0)
2008	→ Portuguesa-RJ (loan)	0	(0)
2010	→ América-RN (loan)	5	(1)
2011	→ Duque Caxias (loan)	2	(0)
2011	→ Västerås SK (loan)	0	(0)
2011–2012	→ Estoril (loan)	19	(0)
2013	→ Macaé (loan)	11	(1)
2014	→ Bangu (loan)	11	(0)
2014–2015	Belenenses	11	(1)
2015–2016	Varzim	17	(1)
2016	Fátima	6	(1)
2017	São Bento	2	(0)
2017	Macaé	14	(0)
2018	Maringá	5	(0)
2018	Tupi	13	(0)
2019	Madureira	11	(0)
2019–2020	Casa Pia	15	(1)
2020–2021	Olhanense	21	(0)
2022–2023	Olhanense	31	(2)
2023	Guadalupe	1	(0)
2024–	Sampaio Corrêa	0	(0)
- * Club domestic league appearances and goals as of 17:14, 19 November 2023 (UTC)

Rodrigo Corrêa Dantas (born October 20, 1989, in Rio de Janeiro) is a Brazilian footballer who plays as a midfielder for Série C club Sampaio Corrêa.

== Career ==
The attacking midfielder began his career with Botafogo, later played on loan for Portuguesa-RJ and América-RN. In March 2011, he joined Swedish club Västerås SK Fotboll on a loan deal lasting until 31 May 2011.

== Honors ==
- Botafogo
  - Taça Rio: 2007, 2008
  - Taça Guanabara: 2009
