= Du Lopes =

Brazilian footballer (born 1980)

Personal information
- Full name: Carlos Eduardo Lopes
- Date of birth: February 22, 1980 (age 46)
- Place of birth: Jaú, Brazil
- Height: 1.90 m (6 ft 3 in)
- Position: Central defender

Team information
- Current team: Sport

Youth career
- XV de Jaú-SP

Senior career*
Years	Team	Apps	(Gls)
2004	América-SP		
2004	União São João Loan		
2004	Barretos-SP Loan		
2004	XV de Piracicaba Loan		
2004–2005	União Barbarense Loan		
2005–2006	Portuguesa-SP Loan		
2006	América-RN Loan		
2006–2008	Sport		
2009	Rio Branco (Americana)		
2009	Guarani	2	(0)
2010	Oeste		
2011	XV de Jau		
- * Club domestic league appearances and goals

Carlos Eduardo Lopes (born February 22, 1980), or simply Du Lopes, is a Brazilian central defender.

== Career ==
Du Lopes made two appearances in the Campeonato Paulista, both with Guarani FC during March 2009. He also played for Oeste Futebol Clube in the 2010 Campeonato Brasileiro Série D.

== Honours ==
- Pernambuco State League: 2007

== Contract ==
- 26 December 2006 to 10 December 2007
