= Washington (footballer, born August 1978) =

Brazilian footballer

Personal information
- Full name: Washington Luiz Mascarenhas Silva
- Date of birth: August 23, 1978 (age 48)
- Place of birth: São José dos Campos, Brazil
- Height: 1.80 m (5 ft 11 in)
- Position: Striker

Youth career
- 1998–2000: São José

Senior career*
Years	Team	Apps	(Gls)
2000	Skoda Xanthi		
2000–2001	Osasco-SP		
2002	Americano		
2002	Vasco	8	(1)
2003	Americano		
2004	Caxias		
2004	América-RN		
2005	Americano		
2005	Portuguesa		
2005–2010	Palmeiras	37	(14)
2006	→ FC Tokyo (loan)	2	(0)
2007	→ Sport (loan)	17	(4)
2007–2008	→ Konyaspor (loan)	19	(3)
2008	→ Portuguesa (loan)	23	(4)
2009	→ Vitória (loan)	5	(0)
2009	→ São Caetano (loan)	28	(12)
2010	→ Atlético Goianiense (loan)	0	(0)
2010	→ Ceará (loan)	22	(4)
2011	Ceará	28	(8)
2012	ABC		
2012–2013	Brasiliense		
2014	Audax Rio		
2014	Duque de Caxias		
2014	Bragantino		
2015	Joseense		
- * Club domestic league appearances and goals

Washington Luiz Mascarenhas Silva (born August 23, 1978), or simply Washington, is a Brazilian former football striker who was the top striker in Copa Libertadores 2006 playing for Palmeiras, scoring five goals.

== Honours ==
=== Individual ===
- Copa Libertadores Top Scorer : 2006

=== Team ===
- Pernambuco State League: 2007
