= David (footballer, born 1982) =

Brazilian footballer

Personal information
- Full name: David França Oliveira e Silva
- Date of birth: 29 May 1982 (age 44)
- Place of birth: Araxá, Brazil
- Height: 1.77 m (5 ft 10 in)
- Position: Defensive midfielder

Team information
- Current team: América Mineiro

Youth career
- 2000: Atlético Paranaense

Senior career*
Years	Team	Apps	(Gls)
2000–2010	Atlético-PR	11	(1)
2000	→ Yverdon (loan)		
2001	→ Náutico (loan)		
2002	→ Pogoń Szczecin (loan)	0	(0)
2003–2005	→ Yverdon (loan)	16	(2)
2005	→ Náutico (loan)		
2006–2007	→ Marília (loan)		
2007–2008	→ Fluminense (loan)	51	(1)
2009	→ Nautico (loan)	1	(0)
2010	Grêmio Prudente	0	(0)
2010–2011	Vila Nova	47	(10)
2012–2016	Goiás	124	(7)
2017	Santa Cruz	6	(0)
2017–2018	América Mineiro	29	(0)
- * Club domestic league appearances and goals as of 5 November 2018

David França Oliveira e Silva (born 29 May 1982), simply known as David, is a Brazilian footballer who last played as a defensive midfielder for América Mineiro.

== Honours ==
Náutico

- Campeonato Pernambucano: 2001

Fluminense

- Copa do Brasil: 2007

Goiás

- Campeonato Goiano: 2012, 2013
- Campeonato Brasileiro Série B: 2012

América Mineiro

- Campeonato Brasileiro Série B: 2017
