= Bilica (footballer) =

Brazilian footballer (born 1979)

Personal information
- Full name: Douglas da Costa Souza
- Date of birth: January 31, 1979 (age 47)
- Place of birth: Fortaleza, Brazil
- Height: 1.81 m (5 ft 11 in)
- Position: Defensive midfielder

Youth career
- 2001: Moto Club

Senior career*
Years	Team	Apps	(Gls)
2002	Moto Club	17	(2)
2003	→ Maranhão (Loan)		
2004	Moto Club	14	(1)
2005	Sampaio Corrêa		
2006	Comerciário		
2006	Chapecoense		
2007	Sport		
2008	Ponte Preta		
2009	Santa Cruz		
2009	Vila Nova	12	(0)
2010	Monte Azul		
2011	CRB		
- * Club domestic league appearances and goals

Douglas da Costa Souza (born 31 January 1979), also known mononymously as Bilica, is a Brazilian footballer who plays as a defensive midfielder.

== Honours ==
Sport Club do Recife

- Santa Catarina State League: 2007

== Contract ==
- 26 June 2007 to 31 December 2007
