= Ribeira do Pombal =

Coordinates: 10°50′S 38°32′W

- Municipality
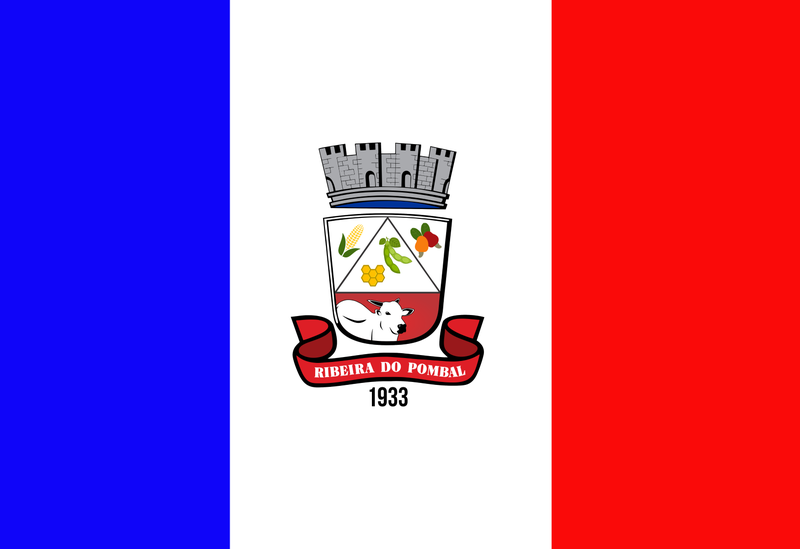
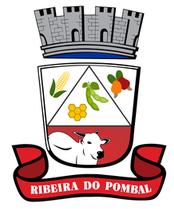
- Flag Coat of arms
- Interactive map of Ribeira do Pombal
- Country: Brazil
- Region: Nordeste
- State: Bahia

Population (2020)
  - Total: 53,956
- Time zone: UTC−3 (BRT)

Ribeira do Pombal is a municipality in the state of Bahia in the North-East region of Brazil.

== See also ==
- List of municipalities in Bahia
