= Kleiton Domingues =

Brazilian footballer

Personal information
- Full name: Kleiton Domingues Barbosa
- Date of birth: 2 April 1988 (age 38)
- Place of birth: Vitória da Conquista, Brazil
- Height: 1.73 m (5 ft 8 in)
- Position: Attacking midfielder

Senior career*
Years	Team	Apps	(Gls)
2008–2010	Vitória	19	(3)
2009	→ Guaratinguetá (loan)	11	(1)
2011–2013	Ituano	44	(9)
2012	→ Guarani (loan)	19	(3)
2013	→ ASA (loan)	13	(0)
2014	Tokushima Vortis	10	(0)
2014	FC Gifu	10	(1)
2015	Capivariano	11	(2)
2015	Boa Esporte	11	(0)
2016	Capivariano	13	(1)
2018	Taubaté	11	(2)
2019	Portuguesa	9	(1)
2020	Fluminense de Feira	8	(2)
2021	Treze (Note: 2021 Campeonato Paraibano appearances not tracked by Soccerway:)	3	(0)
2020	Osasco Audax	13	(1)
- * Club domestic league appearances and goals as of 09:44, 13 May 2021 (UTC)

Kleiton Domingues Barbosa, known simply as Kleiton Domingues, (born 2 April 1988) is a Brazilian former professional footballer who played as an attacking midfielder.

He is Leandro Domingues' brother, who is also a footballer.

== Career statistics ==
Club performance			League		Cup		League Cup		Total	
Season	Club	League	Apps	Goals	Apps	Goals	Apps	Goals	Apps	Goals
Japan			League		Emperor's Cup		League Cup		Total	
2014	Tokushima Vortis	J1 League	10	0	0	0	1	0	11	0
2014	FC Gifu	J2 League	10	1	0	0	-		10	1
Total			20	1	0	0	1	0	21	1
