= Gustavo Caiche =

Brazilian footballer (born 1976)

Personal information
- Full name: Gustavo de Souza Caiche
- Date of birth: 4 June 1976 (age 50)
- Place of birth: São José do Rio Preto, Brazil
- Height: 1.91 m (6 ft 3 in)
- Position: Centre-back

Team information
- Current team: Athletico Paranaense U20s (assistant coach)

Youth career
- 1995–1996: Botafogo-SP

Senior career*
Years	Team	Apps	(Gls)
1997–1998	Botafogo-SP	13	(1)
1998–2002	Atlético-PR	91	(23)
2003	Palmeiras	12	(2)
2003–2006	São Caetano	35	(7)
2007	Corinthians	17	(7)
2007	Sport		
- * Club domestic league appearances and goals

Gustavo de Souza Caiche (born 4 June 1976), is a Brazilian professional football coach and former player who is the assistant coach for Athletico Paranaense U20s. He played as a centre-back.

== Honours ==
- Paraná State League: 1998, 2000, 2001
- Brazilian League: 2001
- Parana State Superleague: 2002
- São Paulo State League: 2004
