= Ramirez (footballer) =

Brazilian footballer

Personal information
- Full name: Washington Ramirez Cruz Santos
- Date of birth: November 22, 1987 (age 38)
- Place of birth: Ribeira do Pombal, Brazil
- Height: 1.79 m (5 ft 10 1/2 in)
- Position: Midfielder

Team information
- Current team: Náutico

Youth career
- 2005–2007: Vitória

Senior career*
| Years | Team | Apps | (Gls) |
| 2008– | Vitória | 6 | (0) |
| 2009 | →América (RN) (loan) | 16 | (0) |
| 2010 | →Náutico (loan) | 26 | (0) |
| 2011– | Náutico | 19 | (1) |
| 2013–2014 | Santa Cruz | 15 | (0) |
- * Club domestic league appearances and goals as of November 8, 2013

Washington Ramirez Cruz Santos (born November 22, 1987, in Ribeira do Pombal), better known as just Ramirez, is a Brazilian football midfielder who currently plays for Náutico.
