= Da Silva (footballer, born 1976) =

Brazilian footballer

Personal information
- Full name: Cleonésio Carlos da Silva
- Date of birth: 12 April 1976 (age 50)
- Place of birth: Ibirité, Minas Gerais, Brazil
- Height: 1.79 m (5 ft 10 in)
- Position: Forward

Senior career*
Years	Team	Apps	(Gls)
1996	Mamoré		
1996–1997	Cruzeiro	26	(2)
1998–2000	Portuguesa	23	(4)
2000–2001	Coritiba	18	(8)
2001	Goiás	12	(5)
2002	Coritiba	19	(5)
2003	Saturn Moscow Oblast	21	(2)
2004–2005	Juventude	32	(14)
2005	Busan I'Park	12	(4)
2005	Pohang Steelers	12	(5)
2006	Jeju United	14	(4)
2007	Juventude	5	(3)
2007	Sport Recife	20	(6)
2008	Al-Khor SC		
2010	Criciúma		
2011	Villa Nova		
- * Club domestic league appearances and goals

Da Silva, full name Cleonésio Carlos da Silva (born 12 April 1976) is a Brazilian former footballer who played as a forward. His previous clubs include Juventude, Jeju United & Busan I'Park & Pohang Steelers in South Korea, FC Saturn Moscow Oblast in Russia, Al-Khor SC in Qatar, Coritiba, Goiás, Portuguesa, Cruzeiro, Mamoré, Sport Recife and Criciúma.

He scored twice in 21 league games for Saturn.

== Honors ==
- Copa do Brasil in 1996 with Cruzeiro
- Campeonato Mineiro in 1996, 1997 with Cruzeiro
- Copa Centro-Oeste in 2001 with Goiás
