= Tiago Cavalcanti =

Brazilian footballer

Personal information
- Full name: Tiago Fernandes Cavalcanti
- Date of birth: 5 September 1984 (age 42)
- Place of birth: Mirassol, Brazil
- Height: 1.83 m (6 ft 0 in)
- Position: Striker

Team information
- Current team: ASA

Youth career
- Mirassol

Senior career*
Years	Team	Apps	(Gls)
1999–2000	Mirassol	44	(12)
2001–2002	Ituano	23	(11)
2003–2004	Iraty	20	(3)
2005	Coritiba	31	(50)
2006	Atlético Mineiro	13	(4)
2006	América-RN	10	(0)
2007	1. FC Köln	6	(0)
2007	Juventude	9	(3)
2008	Joinville	12	(2)
2009	Campinense	7	(1)
2009–2010	Shensa Arak	?	(?)
2010	Wydad Casablanca	0	(0)
2011	Comercial-SP	15	(6)
2011	Mirassol	12	(0)
2012	Chapecoense	9	(2)
2012	Itumbiara	2	(0)
2013	Aparecidense	15	(2)
2013	Sampaio Corrêa	13	(10)
2013	Bragantino	2	(0)
2014	Paulista	1	(0)
2014	Guarani-SP	7	(1)
2014–	ASA		
- * Club domestic league appearances and goals

Tiago Fernandes Cavalcanti (born 5 September 1984) is a Brazilian professional footballer who plays for ASA.

== Career ==
Born in Mirassol, Tiago Cavalcanti began his football career in Brazil. He played for Iraty Sport Club and Clube Atlético Mineiro before being scouted by Christoph Daum and signing a five-year contract with 2. Bundesliga side 1. FC Köln in January 2007.

Tiago Cavalcanti scored 10 goals in the 2013 Campeonato Brasileiro Série C for Sampaio Corrêa Futebol Clube before moving to Série B side Clube Atlético Bragantino in December 2013.
