= Peter (footballer, born 1984) =

Brazilian footballer

Personal information
- Full name: Peter dos Santos Barbosa Júnior
- Date of birth: May 17, 1984 (age 42)
- Place of birth: Rio de Janeiro, Brazil
- Height: 1.76 m (5 ft 9 in)
- Position: Right back

Team information
- Current team: Nacional-AM

Youth career
- 2003: Madureira

Senior career*
Years	Team	Apps	(Gls)
2004–2005	Madureira		
2005–2008	Cruzeiro		
2005	→ Ipatinga (Loan)		
2005	→ Uberlândia (Loan)		
2006	→ Portuguesa-SP (Loan)		
2006	→ Paraná (Loan)	16	(1)
2007	→ São Caetano (Loan)		
2008	→ Ituano (Loan)		
2008–2010	Ituano		
2008	→ Figueirense (Loan)	1	(0)
2010	→ Fortaleza (Loan)	7	(0)
2011	Náutico	33	(3)
2012	Goiás	4	(0)
2013	Figueirense		
2014	Nova Iguaçu		
2015	Nacional-AM	8	(1)
2016	Treze		
2016	Bangu		
2017–	Nacional-AM		
- * Club domestic league appearances and goals as of 12:38, 8 December 2017 (UTC)

Peter dos Santos Barbosa Júnior or simply Peter (born May 17, 1984 in Rio de Janeiro), is a Brazilian right back. He currently plays for Nacional Futebol Clube.

== Career ==
Peter played Campeonato Brasileiro Série A football for Paraná in 2006, whilst on loan from Cruzeiro. He made his Série A debut on 10 September 2006, playing the full 90 minutes in the 1–0 home victory against Fluminense. He scored his first, and so far only, Série A goal on 21 September 2006, against Fortaleza in a 2–0 home win.

He also made one substitute appearance in Série A for Figueirense in 2008.

He has played in Campeonato Brasileiro Série B for Náutico in 2011 and Goiás in 2012, Campeonato Brasileiro Série C for Fortaleza in 2010, and Campeonato Brasileiro Série D for Nacional-AM in 2015.

== Honours ==
- Campeonato Brasileiro Série B: 2012
- Campeonato Cearense: 2010
- Campeonato Goiano: 2012
- Campeonato Amazonense: 2015
