= Matheus Lopes =

Brazilian footballer

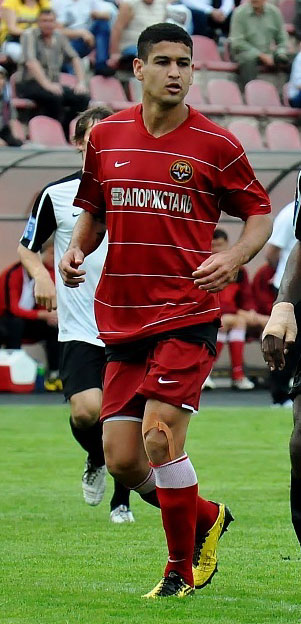

Personal information
- Full name: Matheus Henrique do Carmo Lopes
- Date of birth: 8 March 1985 (age 41)
- Place of birth: Sete Lagoas, Brazil
- Height: 1.89 m (6 ft 2 in)
- Position: Centre back

Youth career
- 2004–2005: América-MG

Senior career*
Years	Team	Apps	(Gls)
2006–2007	Ipatinga	28	(3)
2007	→ Grêmio (loan)	17	(0)
2008–2009	Atlético Paranaense	22	(0)
2009	C.F. Belenenses	5	(0)
2009–2010	Vila Nova	3	(0)
2010	Democrata	14	(1)
2010	Uberlândia	10	(0)
2011–2014	Metalurh Zaporizhya	69	(5)
2015	Chengdu Tiancheng	19	(0)
2015–2017	Tombense	41	(1)
2017	Borneo	24	(2)
2018	Tombense	12	(0)
2018	→ CSA (loan)	13	(2)
2019	Paraná	0	(0)
2020–2021	Tombense	26	(1)
Total		303	(15)
- * Club domestic league appearances and goals

Matheus Henrique do Carmo Lopes (born 8 March 1985 in Sete Lagoas, in the Brazilian state of Minas Gerais) is a former Brazilian central defender.
