= Beto (footballer, born February 1981) =

Brazilian footballer

Personal information
- Full name: Luiz Alberto de Sousa
- Date of birth: February 6, 1981 (age 45)
- Place of birth: São João Del Rey, Brazil
- Height: 1.76 m (5 ft 9 in)
- Position: Left back

Team information
- Current team: Ipatinga

Youth career
- 2001: Cruzeiro

Senior career*
Years	Team	Apps	(Gls)
2002	Joinville	8	(0)
2003	Tupi (Loan)		
2004	Joinville		
2005	Ipatinga (Loan)		
2006	Paulista (Loan)		
2006	Atlético-PR		
2007	Ipatinga (Loan)		
2008	Ipatinga		
- * Club domestic league appearances and goals

Luiz Alberto de Sousa (born February 6, 1981, in São João Del Rey), or simply Beto, is a Brazilian left back. He currently plays for Ipatinga.

== Honours ==
- Minas Gerais State League: 2005

== Contract ==
- 1 January 2008 to 1 January 2011
