= Bia (Brazilian footballer) =

Brazilian footballer (born 1981)

Personal information
- Full name: Jaílson França Braz
- Date of birth: June 15, 1981 (age 45)
- Place of birth: Carpina, Brazil
- Height: 1.81 m (5 ft 11 in)
- Position: Defensive midfielder

Youth career
- 2000–2002: AGA-PE

Senior career*
Years	Team	Apps	(Gls)
2003	Petrolina		
2004	Confiança-SE		
2005	Ypiranga		
2006	→ Sport (loan)		
2007–2009	Sport		
2009	Salgueiro		
2010	Mixto		
2011	Marília		
- * Club domestic league appearances and goals

Jaílson França Braz (born June 15, 1981), or simply Bia, is a Brazilian former professional footballer who played as a defensive midfielder.

== Honours ==
- Campeonato Pernambucano in 2006, 2007 and 2008 with Sport Club do Recife
- Copa do Brasil in 2008 with Sport Club do Recife
