= Marinho (footballer, born 1979) =

Brazilian footballer

Personal information
- Full name: Mairon César Reis
- Date of birth: 27 August 1979 (age 47)
- Place of birth: Belo Horizonte, Brazil
- Height: 1.77 m (5 ft 10 in)
- Position: Striker

Youth career
- 1999–2000: Miguelense-AL

Senior career*
Years	Team	Apps	(Gls)
2001–2002	Ipatinga		
2003	Democrata		(16)
2003	→ Tupi (loan)		
2004	Cruzeiro		
2004	→ Hammarby (loan)	1	(0)
2004	→ Juventude (loan)	3	(0)
2004–2005	→ Ipatinga (loan)		
2006	Democrata		
2006–2008	Atlético Mineiro	68	(28)
2008	→ Ipatinga (loan)		
2009	Noroeste	12	(4)
2009	São Caetano	5	(0)
2010–2011	Villa Nova	20	(5)
2011	CRB	4	(0)
2011–2012	Guarani-MG	10	(5)
- * Club domestic league appearances and goals

Mairon César Reis or simply Marinho (born 27 August 1979), is a Brazilian former football striker.

== Honours ==
- Minas Gerais Cup: 2004
- Minas Gerais State League: 2005
- Brazilian League (2nd division): 2006
- Campeão Mineiro: 2007
