= Luciano Mandi =

Brazilian footballer

Personal information
- Full name: Luciano de Souza Gomes
- Date of birth: 22 January 1986 (age 40)
- Place of birth: Porciúncula, Brazil
- Height: 1.86 m (6 ft 1 in)
- Position: Attacking midfielder

Youth career
- –2005: Bangu

Senior career*
Years	Team	Apps	(Gls)
2007	Varginha		
2007–2008	Ipatinga		
2008	→ Tupi (loan)		
2009	Oeste		
2009	Red Bull Brasil		
2010–2012	São Caetano		
2012	→ São Bernardo FC (loan)		
2013	São Bernardo FC		
2014–2015	Mirassol		
2016	Barretos		
2016	Votuporanguense		
2017	CRAC		
2017	Operário-MT		
2018	Democrata-SL		
2018	Sampaio Corrêa-RJ		
2019	Ceilândia		
2019	Boston City-MG		
2020	Caldense		
2020	Tupi		
2021–2022	Dourados AC		
- * Club domestic league appearances and goals

Luciano de Souza Gomes (born 22 January 1986), better known as Luciano Mandi, is a Brazilian former professional footballer who played as an attacking midfielder.

== Career ==
Luciano Mandi was part of Bangu youth levels, but when he was unable to become a professional in football, abandoned his career. He returned to Varginha EC in the minor divisions of MG, and due to his good performance, he was hired by Ipatinga. He also played for Tupi and Oeste, and in 2009, he was champion of the second division of São Paulo with the new club Red Bull Brasil.

He was traded to São Caetano where he played for two years, and later to São Bernardo FC, the club where he won the Série A2 and the Copa Paulista. In 2014 he defended Mirassol in the Copa Paulista, remaining for the following season.

Mandi played for several other clubs until returning to Minas Gerais football in 2020, at Caldense, and in the second semester, returning to Tupi for Module II. His last professional club was Dourados AC, in Mato Grosso do Sul.

== Honours ==
Red Bull Brasil

- Campeonato Paulista Segunda Divisão: 2009

São Bernardo FC

- Campeonato Paulista Série A2: 2012
- Copa Paulista: 2013
