= Marlon (footballer, born 1986) =

Brazilian footballer

Personal information
- Full name: Marlon Ventura Rodrigues
- Date of birth: November 21, 1986 (age 39)
- Place of birth: Rio de Janeiro, Brazil
- Height: 1.85 m (6 ft 1 in)
- Position: Centre back

Team information
- Current team: Treze

Youth career
- 2001–2006: Flamengo

Senior career*
Years	Team	Apps	(Gls)
2006–2011	Flamengo	7	(0)
2008	→ Ipatinga (loan)	0	(0)
2008–2009	→ Thrasyvoulos (loan)	18	(0)
2010–2011	→ Duque de Caxias (loan)	24	(0)
2011	→ Náutico (loan)	34	(4)
2012	Náutico	9	(0)
2013	Ceará	0	(0)
2014–2015	ABC	24	(0)
2016	Imperatriz	0	(0)
2016	Flamengo PI	0	(0)
2017	Central	0	(0)
2017	Anápolis	3	(0)
2018	Salgueiro	9	(0)
2019	Joinville	0	(0)
2020	Retrô FC Brasil	0	(0)
2020	Rio Claro	0	(0)
2020	Globo FC	12	(0)
2021–	Treze	0	(0)

International career
2003	Brazil U-17	2	(0)
- * Club domestic league appearances and goals as of 20:33, 19 February 2021 (UTC)

Marlon Ventura Rodrigues (born November 21, 1986, in Rio de Janeiro), or simply Marlon, is a Brazilian central defender. He currently plays for Treze.

== Career ==
Marlon is create Estádio da Gávea. It started from small Flamengo and went through all the basic categories within the Rubro-Negro. The quarterback is the same generation of youth who do Flamengo won the Tricampeonato Carioca de Juniores in 2005, 2006 and 2007. Champion also Torneio Rio-São Paulo de juniores 2005 and Taça Otávio Pinto Guimarães in 2006.

The debut of the quarterback was exactly in 2006 when, under the command of Adílio, master of the base, and then acting in the first team, Marlon joined the B team Flamengo for the first two rounds of the Campeonato Estadual.

Then only 19 years old, the young quarterback liked, and still later that year, would have other opportunities among professionals in the second responded to the commands of Moacir Pereira, assistant Ney Franco. It is the first team play three days later, the Copa do Brasil replay against Vasco da Gama, and once again, Marlon starred in a mixed team.

Went on to play six more times in 2006, totaling eight games with no goals scored that season. Nevertheless, emerged as a promise to the team of 2007, however, the idea has not been met and after a few opportunities this season, was loaned to Ipatinga in 2008 where he also had many opportunities.

Even in the middle of 2008, considered not useful for the scheme Caio Júnior, who had a solid defense formed by Ronaldo Angelim and Fábio Luciano, Marlon was loaned to the Thrasyvoulos Fylis Greece, where he remained until 2009.

Upon his return to Estádio da Gávea, despite the retirement of Fábio Luciano, Marlon was rarely mentioned. However, in the 13th round of the 2009 Brazilian Championship, due to the suspensions of defenders Fabrício and Welinton, Marlon was selected to face Grêmio Prudente at the Estádio do Maracanã. During the match, he conceded a penalty that impacted his standing with the supporters.

In 2010 Marlon he was loaned to Duque de Caxias until the end of the 2011 state championship. In May 2011, Marlon has signed for Náutico until the end of 2011.

Marlon signed for Treze for in December 2020, for the 2021 season.

=== Career statistics ===
(Correct as of December 5, 2012)

Appearances and goals by club, season and competition
Club	Season	State League		League		Copa do Brasil		Copa Libertadores		Copa Sudamericana		Total	
Club	Season	Apps	Goals	Apps	Goals	Apps	Goals	Apps	Goals	Apps	Goals	Apps	Goals
Flamengo	2006	3	0	6	0	—		—		—		9	0
Flamengo	2007	1	0	0	0	—		—		—		1	0
Flamengo	2009	-	-	1	0	—		—		—		1	0
Duque de Caxias (loan)	2010	11	1	24	0	—		—		—		35	1
Duque de Caxias (loan)	2011	13	1	0	0	—		—		—		13	1
Náutico (loan)	2011	-	-	34	4	—		—		—		34	4
Náutico	2012	20	2	9	0	—		—		—		29	2
Total		48	4	74	4	-	-	-	-	-	-	131	6

according to combined sources on the Flamengo official website and Flaestatística.

== Honours ==
=== Club ===
- Flamengo

Youth

  - Campeonato Carioca Infantil: 2001
  - Campeonato Carioca de Juniores: 2005, 2006
  - Torneio Rio-São Paulo de Juniores: 2005
  - Taça Otávio Pinto Guimarães: 2006

Professional

  - Taça Guanabara: 2007
  - Rio de Janeiro State League: 2007
  - Brazilian Série A: 2009

=== National team ===
- FIFA U-17 World Championship: 2003

== Contract ==
- Duque de Caxias on loan from Flamengo.
