= Zé Carlos (footballer, born 1980) =

Brazilian footballer

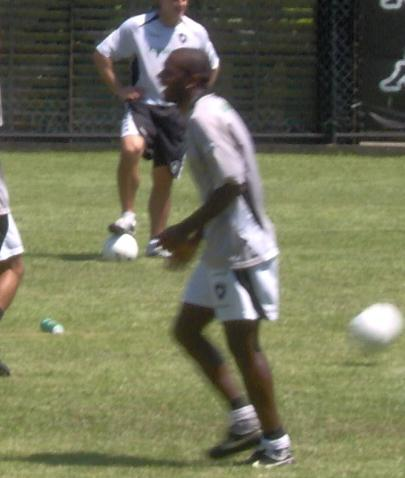

Personal information
- Full name: José Carlos Garcia Leal
- Date of birth: 15 July 1980 (age 46)
- Place of birth: Manga, Brazil
- Height: 1.82 m (6 ft 0 in)
- Positions: Left back; midfielder

Team information
- Current team: Botafogo-PB (assistant)

Youth career
- 1999: Goiás

Senior career*
Years	Team	Apps	(Gls)
2000–2002	Goiás	46	(5)
2003	São Caetano	34	(5)
2004	Corinthians	15	(2)
2005–2007	Cerezo Osaka	88	(16)
2008	Botafogo	24	(4)
2009	Goiás	15	(0)
2010	Náutico	23	(6)
2011	Caxias	15	
2011	Grêmio Barueri	21	(1)
2012	Aparecidense		
2013	Sobradinho		
2014	Aparecidense		
2014	Icasa		
2014–2015	Ituano		

Managerial career
- 2016: Ríver (assistant)
- 2016: Aparecidense
- 2017: Goiás U20 (assistant)
- 2017: Goiás U17
- 2020–2021: Confiança (assistant)
- 2021: Confiança (interim)
- 2022: Amazonas (assistant)
- 2023: Carmópolis U17
- 2023: Atlético Alagoinhas
- 2023: Itumbiara
- 2024: Atlético Alagoinhas
- 2024: Carmópolis
- 2024–2025: CSA (assistant)
- 2025–: Botafogo-PB (assistant)
- 2025: Botafogo-PB (interim)
- * Club domestic league appearances and goals

José Carlos Garcia Leal (born 15 July 1980 in Manga, Minas Gerais), commonly known as Zé Carlos, is a Brazilian football coach and former player who played as either a left back or a midfielder. He is the current assistant coach of Botafogo-PB.

== Club statistics ==
Club performance			League		Cup		League Cup		Total	
Season	Club	League	Apps	Goals	Apps	Goals	Apps	Goals	Apps	Goals
Brazil			League		Copa do Brasil		League Cup		Total	
2000	Goiás	Série A	10	2					10	2
2001	Goiás	Série A	16	2					16	2
2002	Goiás	Série A	20	1					20	1
2003	São Caetano	Série A	36	5					36	5
2004	Corinthians	Série A	15	2					15	2
Japan			League		Emperor's Cup		J.League Cup		Total	
2005	Cerezo Osaka	J1 League	29	6	2	0	6	2	37	8
2006	Cerezo Osaka	J1 League	24	5	1	0	5	2	30	7
2007	Cerezo Osaka	J2 League	35	5	2	0	-		37	5
Brazil			League		Copa do Brasil		League Cup		Total	
2008	Botafogo	Série A	24	4					24	4
2009	Goiás	Série A								
Country	Brazil		121	16					121	16
Country	Japan		88	16	5	0	11	4	104	20
Total			209	32	5	0	11	4	225	36

== Honours ==
- Goiás State League: 1999, 2000, 2002
- Brazilian League (2nd division): 1999
- Brazilian Center-West Cup: 2000, 2001, 2002
