= Rosembrick =

Brazilian footballer

Personal information
- Full name: Rosembrick José Bezerra de Lira
- Date of birth: April 3, 1979 (age 47)
- Place of birth: São Lourenço da Mata, Brazil
- Height: 1.82 m (6 ft 0 in)
- Position: Attacking midfielder

Youth career
- 1996: Sport

Senior career*
Years	Team	Apps	(Gls)
1997	Sport		
1998–1999	Ferroviário-CE		
1999	→ Paysandu (Loan)		
2000	Paysandu		
2001–2002	Ferroviário-PR		
2003	Telemaco Borba-PR		
2003	AGA-PE		
2004	Vitória		
2005–2008	Santa Cruz	28	(2)
2006	→ Palmeiras (Loan)		
2007	→ Sport (Loan)	16	(0)
2008	→ São Caetano (Loan)		
2009	→ Vila Nova (Loan)		
2009	América-RN		
2009	Treze		
2010	Ypiranga-PE		
2010	Brasiliense	12	(1)
2011	Central	0	(0)
2011	Criciúma	0	(0)
2011	Salgueiro	4	(0)
2012	Araripina		
2012	Cabense		
2013	Águia Negra		
2014	Fast Clube		
2014	VOCEM		
2015	Ypiranga-PE		
2015	Fast Clube		
2016	Juventus-SC		
2016	Fast Clube		
- * Club domestic league appearances and goals

Rosembrick José Bezerra de Lira (born April 3, 1979), or simply Rosembrick, is a Brazilian former professional footballer who played as an attacking midfielder.

== Honours ==
- Pernambuco State League: 2005, 2007
