= Wescley (footballer, born 1984) =

Brazilian footballer

Personal information
- Full name: Wescley Pina Gonçalves
- Date of birth: February 15, 1984 (age 42)
- Place of birth: Vila Velha, Brazil
- Position: Central defender

Team information
- Current team: Vila Nova

Youth career
- 2002: Vasco da Gama

Senior career*
Years	Team	Apps	(Gls)
2003–2004	Vasco da Gama		
2004–2005	Maccabi Haifa	26	(0)
2005–2006	Corinthians		
2006	Estrela da Amadora		
2007–2008	Juventude		
2008	Criciúma		
2009–2009	Denizlispor	7	(1)
2009–2010	Ceará		
2010	Atlético Goianiense	1	(0)
2010	Naútico	19	(0)
2011	Grêmio Prudente		
2011	Naútico	1	(0)
2011–	Ponte Preta	12	(1)
- * Club domestic league appearances and goals as of June 2009

Wescley Pina Gonçalves (born February 15, 1984) is a Brazilian footballer currently playing for Vila Nova Futebol Clube.

== Career ==
=== Vasco da Gama ===
Wescley started his career playing for Vasco da Gama, after being promoted from the club's youth squad. Earlier in the 2003 Campeonato Brasileiro Série A season, he was promoted to the club's first team squad, playing several games for the club and scoring a goal in the second match of the competition, against Goiás.

=== Stint in Israel ===
Before arriving in Israel, a lot of media attention was paid to Wescley since he was signing with Maccabi Haifa and was expected to be their leader for the future. Wescley had the credentials especially since he was captain of the Brazilian Olympic team but was unable to acclimate to Israeli culture and ended leaving after a mediocre first season.

=== Return to Brazil ===
He returned to Brazil in 2005, to play for Corinthians, where he won the Campeonato Brasileiro Série A of that year, playing for Estrela da Amadora of Portugal in the following year. Wescley played for Juventude during the Série A 2007, but was unable to prevent his club from being relegated to the second level. In 2008, he joined Criciúma.

=== First time in Turkey ===
On 22 December 2008, Denizlispor announced that Wescley joins the team.
