= Diego Bispo =

Brazilian footballer (born 1989)

Personal information
- Full name: Diego Andrade Silva Bispo
- Date of birth: January 5, 1989 (age 37)
- Place of birth: Salvador, Brazil
- Height: 1.86 m (6 ft 1 in)
- Position: Defender

Team information
- Current team: Altos

Youth career
- 2005–2008: Galícia
- 2008–2009: Náutico

Senior career*
Years	Team	Apps	(Gls)
2009–2014	Náutico		
2012	→ Santa Cruz (loan)		
2013	→ Paysandu (loan)		
2014	→ Marcílio Dias (loan)		
2014	→ Vila Nova (loan)		
2015	Marcílio Dias		
2015	Pelotas		
2015	Itumbiara		
2015	Central de Caruaru		
2016–	Altos		
- * Club domestic league appearances and goals

Diego Andrade Silva Bispo or simply Diego Bispo (born January 5, 1989), is a Brazilian defender. He currently plays for Altos.

== Honours ==
Náutico

- Copa Pernambuco: 2011

Paysandu

- Campeonato Paraense: 2013

Altos

- Campeonato Piauiense: 2017
