= Diego da Silva (footballer, born 1985) =

Brazilian footballer

Diego Silva
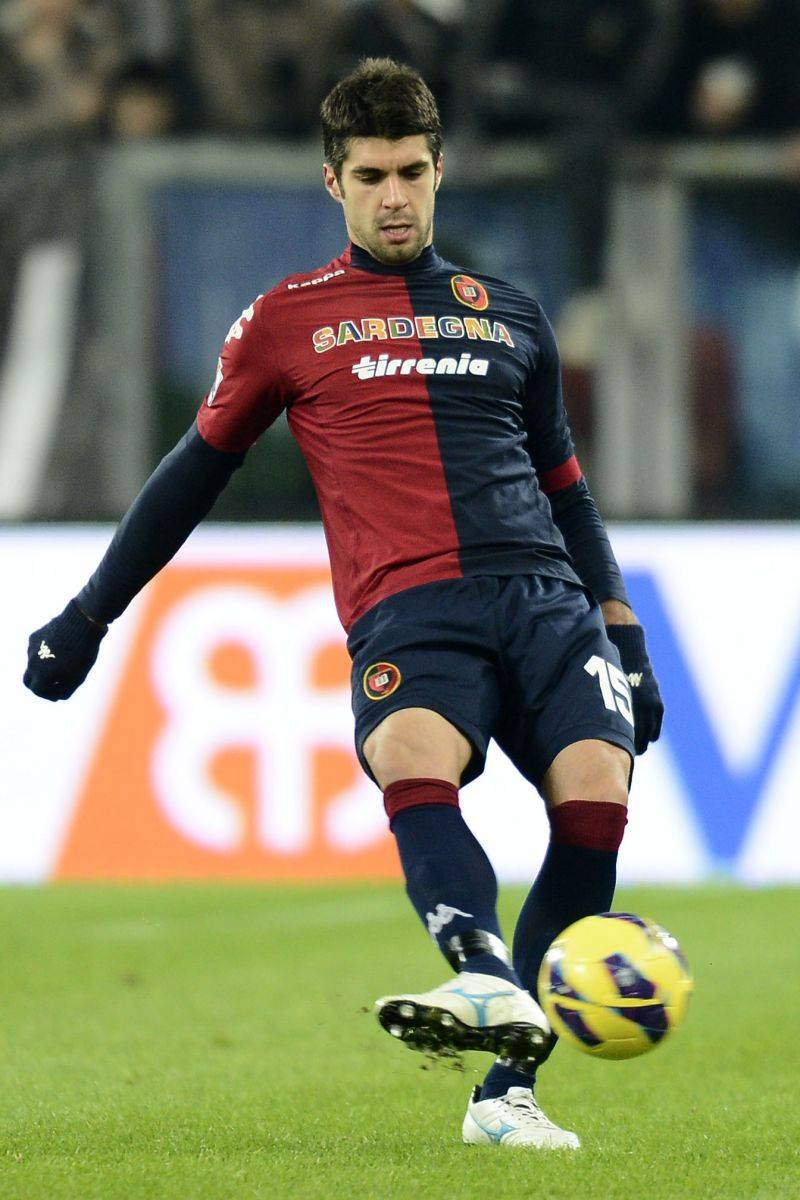

Personal information
- Full name: Diego da Silva
- Date of birth: 24 January 1985 (age 41)
- Place of birth: Foz do Iguaçu, Brazil
- Height: 1.76 m (5 ft 9 in)
- Positions: Attacking midfielder; forward

Team information
- Current team: Nacional de Nova Serrana

Youth career
- Cruzeiro

Senior career*
Years	Team	Apps	(Gls)
2002–2010	Cruzeiro	0	(0)
2005–2006	→ Ipatinga (loan)		
2006	→ Flamengo (loan)	11	(2)
2006–2007	→ Ipatinga (loan)		
2008	→ Vitória (loan)		
2008	→ Barueri (loan)		
2009–2010	→ Ipatinga (loan)	23	(3)
2010–	Nacional de Nova Serrana	0	(0)
- * Club domestic league appearances and goals

Diego da Silva or simply Diego Silva (born 24 January 1985), is a Brazilian footballer who plays for Nacional de Nova Serrana.

== Biography ==
Born in Foz do Iguaçu, Paraná, Diego started his career with Minas Gerais club Cruzeiro. Diego was loaned to Ipatinga for 2005 Campeonato Mineiro. The loan later extended until April 2006 in June 2005, which he played for the team at 2006 Copa do Brasil.

In April 2006 he left for Flamengo until the end of year 2006, which Flamengo won the cup but Diego was ineligible to play. He also played a few matches for the team at 2006 Campeonato Brasileiro Série A.

In September 2006, he was loaned to Ipatinga for a second time, agreed a deal until end of year 2006. The team finished as the third of 2006 Campeonato Brasileiro Série C and promoted.

In March 2007 he was loaned to Ipatinga again in a 1-year deal.

In January 2008 he left for Vitória in a 1-year deal. In June 2008, he was signed by Barueri in 1-year deal. Barueri finished as the fourth of 2008 Campeonato Brasileiro Série B and promoted.

In January 2009 he left for Ipatinga in a 1 1/2-year deal. In June 2010, he was transferred to Nacional de Nova Serrana in a 2-year deal.
