= Osmar (footballer, born 1982) =

Brazilian footballer

Personal information
- Full name: Osmar Coelho Claudiano
- Date of birth: February 23, 1982 (age 44)
- Place of birth: Varginha, Brazil
- Height: 1.76 m (5 ft 9 in)
- Position: Right back

Team information
- Current team: Volta Redonda

Youth career
- 2002: América-MG

Senior career*
Years	Team	Apps	(Gls)
2003–2007	América Mineiro		
2005–2006	→ Santa Cruz (Loan)		
2007	→ Sport (Loan)		
2008–2010	Vila Nova		
2011	América de Natal		
2011	Icasa		
2012	Red Bull Brasil		
2012–2013	ASA		
2014	Icasa		
2015	Treze		
2015–2016	Tupi		
2016–	Volta Redonda		
- * Club domestic league appearances and goals

Osmar Coelho Claudiano (born February 23, 1982, in Varginha), or simply Osmar, is a Brazilian right back.

== Honours ==
- Pernambuco State League: 2005, 2007

== Contract ==
- Sport (Loan) 3 January 2007 to 31 December 2007
- América-MG 2 January 2007 to 31 December 2010
