= Geílson =

Brazilian footballer (born 1984)

Personal information
- Full name: Geílson de Carvalho Soares
- Date of birth: April 10, 1984 (age 42)
- Place of birth: Cuiabá, Brazil
- Height: 1.84 m (6 ft 1/2 in)
- Position: Striker

Youth career
- 2000–2001: Atlético Paranaense

Senior career*
Years	Team	Apps	(Gls)
2001–2002	Atlético Paranaense		
2002–2003	Mixto		
2003	→ Albirex Niigata (loan)		
2003–2004	Internacional	2	(0)
2004–2012	Santos		
2006–2007	→ Al Hazm (loan)	27	(10)
2007–2009	→ Atlético Paranaense (loan)	18	(6)
2009–2010	→ Náutico (loan)	8	(0)
2010–2011	→ Guarani (loan)	30	(8)
2011–2012	→ ABC (loan)	4	(0)
2012	→ Santa Cruz (loan)	12	(1)
2012–2013	Tractor	15	(4)
2013–2014	Mixto		
2014	Al-Riffa	8	(5)
2014–2015	CEOV	6	(2)
2015–2016	Cuiabá	9	(2)
2016	Votuporanguense		
2017–	Dom Bosco		
- * Club domestic league appearances and goals as of 25 April 2018

Geílson de Carvalho Soares (born April 10, 1984 in Cuiabá), referred to as Geílson, is a striker.

== Club statistics ==
Club performance			League	
Season	Club	League	Apps	Goals
Brazil			League	
2003	Mirassol		0	0
Japan			League	
2003	Albirex Niigata	J2 League	2	0
Brazil			League	
2004	Internacional	Série A	0	0
2004	Santos	Série A	0	0
2005	Santos	Série A	23	10
2006	Santos	Série A	4	0
Saudi Arabia			League	
2006–07	Al-Hazm	Professional League	18	6
Brazil			League	
2007	Atlético Paranaense	Série A	2	0
Iran			League	
2012–13	Tractor	Pro League	8	0
Country	Brazil		29	10
Country	Japan		2	0
Country	Saudi Arabia		18	6
Country	Country		31	10

== Honours ==
- Rio Grande do Sul State League: 2004
- São Paulo State League: 2006
