= Derley (footballer, born 1986) =

Brazilian footballer

Personal information
- Full name: Wanderley de Jesus Sousa
- Date of birth: 2 August 1986 (age 40)
- Place of birth: Anápolis, Brazil
- Height: 1.87 m (6 ft 2 in)
- Position: Midfielder

Youth career
- 2006–2007: Internacional

Senior career*
Years	Team	Apps	(Gls)
2008–2012	Internacional	12	(0)
2008–2010	→ Náutico (loan)	36	(3)
2011–2012	→ Náutico (loan)	39	(8)
2012–2014	Atlético Paranaense	18	(0)
2013	→ Náutico (loan)	28	(2)
2014	→ Emirates (loan)	1	(0)
2014–2016	León	3	(1)
2015–2016	→ FC Juárez (loan)	40	(5)
2016–2017	Santa Cruz	18	(0)
2017	Dibba Al-Fujairah	12	(3)
2017	Santa Cruz	21	(1)
2018–2021	Fortaleza	57	(1)
2021	Santa Cruz	10	(0)
2022	Ferroviário		
- * Club domestic league appearances and goals as of 26 June 2021

Wanderley de Jesus Sousa or simply Derley (born 2 August 1986) is a Brazilian midfielder.
