= 2013 Santa Cruz Futebol Clube season =

Santa Cruz
2013 season
- Chairman: Antônio Luiz Neto
- Manager: Marcelo Martelotte; Sandro Barbosa; Vica
- Stadium: Estádio do Arruda
- Série C: Champions (1st title)
- Copa do Brasil: Second round
- Copa do Nordeste: Quarter-finals
- Pernambucano: Champions (27th title)
- Top goalscorer: League: André Dias (8); All: Dênis Marques (14)
Home colours	Away colours	Third colours

The 2013 season was Santa Cruz's 100th season in the club's history. Santa Cruz competed in the Campeonato Pernambucano, Copa do Nordeste, Copa do Brasil and Série C.

== Squad ==
Note: Flags indicate national team as defined under FIFA eligibility rules; some limited exceptions apply. Players may hold more than one non-FIFA nationality.

No.	Pos.	Nation	Player
1	GK	BRA	Tiago Cardoso (captain)
2	DF	BRA	Everton Sena
3	DF	BRA	Leandro Souza
4	DF	BRA	Renan Fonseca
5	MF	BRA	Tozo
6	DF	BRA	Tiago Costa
7	MF	BRA	Raul
8	MF	BRA	Luciano Sorriso
9	FW	BRA	Dênis Marques
10	MF	BRA	Natan
11	MF	BRA	Junior Xuxa
12	DF	BRA	Panda
13	DF	BRA	Nininho
14	DF	BRA	Vágner
15	MF	BRA	Sandro Manoel
16	FW	BRA	Leozinho
17	FW	BRA	Flávio Caça-Rato

No.	Pos.	Nation	Player
18	MF	BRA	Jefferson Maranhão
19	FW	BRA	André Dias
20	MF	BRA	Renatinho
21	FW	BRA	Netto Imperador
22	MF	ARG	Fabián Coronel
23	MF	BRA	Dedé
24	GK	BRA	Fred
25	MF	BRA	Ramirez
26	DF	POR	Fabinho Souza
27	GK	BRA	Wadson
28	GK	BRA	Diego Lima
29	FW	BRA	Anderson Salgueiro
30	DF	BRA	Renato Camilo
31	GK	BRA	Cley
33	DF	BRA	Léo Bahia
-	DF	BRA	Patrick

== Statistics ==
=== Overall ===
Games played	53 (8 Copa do Nordeste, 15 Pernambucano, 4 Copa do Brasil, 26 Série C)
Games won	31 (5 Copa do Nordeste, 9 Pernambucano, 2 Copa do Brasil, 15 Série C)
Games drawn	10 (1 Copa do Nordeste, 3 Pernambucano, 1 Copa do Brasil, 5 Série C)
Games lost	12 (2 Copa do Nordeste, 3 Pernambucano, 1 Copa do Brasil, 6 Série C)
Goals scored	77
Goals conceded	45
Goal difference	+32
Best results (goal difference)	6–0 (H) v Treze – Série C – 2013.08.10
Worst result (goal difference)	0–3 (A) v Campinense – Copa do Nordeste – 2013.01.23; 0–3 (A) v Sampaio Corrêa – Série C – 2013.08.03
Top scorer	Dênis Marques (14)

Source: Santa Cruz official website

=== Goalscorers ===
Place	Position	Nationality	Number	Name	Copa do Nordeste	Campeonato Pernambucano	Copa do Brasil	Série C	Total
1	FW	(Brazil)	9	Dênis Marques	1	7	1	5	14
2	FW	(Brazil)	17	Flávio Caça-Rato	1	4	0	5	10
3	FW	(Brazil)	19	André Dias	0	0	0	8	8
4	MF	(Brazil)	7	Raul	0	1	1	5	7
4	MF	(Brazil)	20	Renatinho	3	1	0	3	7
5	MF	(Brazil)	8	Luciano Sorriso	0	1	1	3	5
6	MF	(Brazil)	10	Natan	0	1	0	2	3
7	FW	(Brazil)	18	Danilo Santos	2	0	0	0	2
7	MF	(Brazil)	16	Everton Heleno	0	1	0	1	2
7	DF	(Brazil)	2	Everton Sena	1	0	1	0	2
7	MF	(Brazil)	18	Jefferson Maranhão	0	2	0	0	2
7	FW	(Brazil)	19	Philco	2	0	0	0	2
7	DF	(Brazil)	4	Renan Fonseca	0	0	0	2	2
7	MF	(Brazil)	15	Sandro Manoel	0	1	0	1	2
8	DF	(Brazil)	22	César Lucena	0	1	0	0	1
8	MF	(Brazil)	23	Dedé	0	0	0	1	1
8	MF	(Brazil)	11	Junior Xuxa	0	0	0	1	1
8	DF	(Brazil)	13	Marquinhos	1	0	0	0	1
8	DF	(Brazil)	19	Oziel	0	0	0	1	1
8	FW	(Brazil)	26	Paulo César	1	0	0	0	1
8	DF	(Brazil)	6	Tiago Costa	0	0	0	1	1
8	DF	(Brazil)	14	William Alves	1	0	0	0	1
				Own goals	0	0	0	1	1
				Total	13	20	4	40	77

== Competitions ==
=== Copa do Nordeste ===
==== Group stage ====
20 January 2013 1	Santa Cruz	1–0	CRB	Recife
19:30 (UTC-3)	Philco 2'	Report		Stadium: Estádio José do Rego Maciel (Arruda); Attendance: 24,287; Referee: Ranilton Oliveira de Sousa

23 January 2013 2	Campinense	3–0	Santa Cruz	Campina Grande
22:15 (UTC-3)	Thiago Granja 32'; Glaybson 49'; Edvânio 59'	Report		Stadium: Estádio Governador Ernani Sátyro (Amigão); Attendance: 5,346; Referee: Mayron F dos Reis Novais

26 January 2013 3	Santa Cruz	2–0	Feirense	Recife
17:00 (UTC-3)	Philco 6'; Renatinho 45+2'	Report		Stadium: Estádio José do Rego Maciel (Arruda); Attendance: 17,355; Referee: Gleysto Gonçalves da Silva

30 January 2013 4	Feirense	0–1	Santa Cruz	Feira de Santana
22:15 (UTC-3)		Report	Danilo Santos 81'	Stadium: Estádio Municipal Alberto Oliveira (Joia da Princesa); Attendance: 694; Referee: Antonio Dib Moraes de Sousa

2 February 2013 5	Santa Cruz	2–0	Campinense	Recife
17:00 (UTC-3)	Renatinho 15'; William Alves 47'	Report		Stadium: Estádio José do Rego Maciel (Arruda); Attendance: 20,029; Referee: Wladyerisson Silva Oliveira

6 February 2013 6	CRB	2–3	Santa Cruz	Maceió
22:15 (UTC-3)	Jairo 33'; Carlão 43'	Report	Danilo Santos 3'; Flávio Caça-Rato 67'; Marquinhos 85'	Stadium: Estádio Rei Pelé; Attendance: 1,484; Referee: Pablo Ramon Goncalves Pinheiro

==== Quartef-finals ====
13 February 2013	Fortaleza	3–3	Santa Cruz	Fortaleza
22:15 (UTC-3)	Esley 25'; Assisinho 48'; Marinho Donizete 70'	Report	Renatinho 15'; Paulo César 20'; Everton Sena 82'	Stadium: Estádio Presidente Vargas; Attendance: 8,869; Referee: Francisco Carlos do Nascimento

17 February 2013	Santa Cruz	1–2	Fortaleza	Recife
16:00 (UTC-3)	Dênis Marques 5'	Report	Júlio Madureira 69'; Assisinho 90+1'	Stadium: Estádio José do Rego Maciel (Arruda); Attendance: 30,087; Referee: Arilson Bispo da Anunciação

==== Record ====
Final Position	Points	Matches	Wins	Draws	Losses	Goals For	Goals Away	Avg%
6th	16	8	5	1	2	13	10	66%

=== Campeonato Pernambucano ===
==== Second stage ====
23 February 2013 1	Santa Cruz	2–1	Pesqueira	Recife
20:00 (UTC-3)	Dênis Marques 45'; Everton Heleno 75'		Dadá Pesqueira 38'	Stadium: Estádio José do Rego Maciel (Arruda); Attendance: 8,501; Referee: Luiz Cláudio Sobral

27 February 2013 2	Belo Jardim	1–2	Santa Cruz	Belo Jardim
22:00 (UTC-3)	Muller 74'		Dênis Marques 41'; Luciano Sorriso 62'	Stadium: Estádio José Bezerra de Mendonça; Attendance: 6,208; Referee: Cláudio Mercante

3 March 2013 3	Santa Cruz	0–1	Salgueiro	Recife
16:00 (UTC-3)			Fabrício Ceará 54'	Stadium: Estádio José do Rego Maciel (Arruda); Attendance: 17,256; Referee: Gleydson Leite

6 March 2013 4	Ypiranga	0–2	Santa Cruz	Santa Cruz do Capibaribe
20:00 (UTC-3)			Flávio Caça-Rato 6'; Dênis Marques 23'	Stadium: Estádio Otávio Limeira Alves; Attendance: 4,477; Referee: Ricardo Jorge

11 March 2013 5	Santa Cruz	2–0	Central	Recife
20:00 (UTC-3)	Jefferson Maranhão 19', 40'			Stadium: Estádio José do Rego Maciel (Arruda); Attendance: 14,015; Referee: Francisco Carlos do Nascimento

14 March 2013 6	Santa Cruz	0–1	Chã Grande	Recife
20:00 (UTC-3)			Jhulliam 39'	Stadium: Estádio José do Rego Maciel (Arruda); Attendance: 13,121; Referee: Tiago Nascimento

17 March 2013 7	Serra Talhada	1–1	Santa Cruz	Serra Talhada
16:00 (UTC-3)	Alex Costa 26'		Flávio Caça-Rato 65'	Stadium: Estádio Nildo Pereira de Menezes; Attendance: 4,682; Referee: Cláudio Mercante

24 March 2013 8	Santa Cruz	1–0	Petrolina	Recife
16:00 (UTC-3)	César Lucena 89'			Stadium: Estádio José do Rego Maciel (Arruda); Attendance: 13,309; Referee: Neilson Santos

31 March 2013 9	Náutico	0–2	Santa Cruz	Recife
16:00 (UTC-3)		Report	Natan 77'; Dênis Marques 79'	Stadium: Estádio Eládio de Barros Carvalho (Aflitos); Referee: Gleydson Leite

7 April 2013 10	Porto	1–1	Santa Cruz	Caruaru
16:00 (UTC-3)	Joelson 49' (pen.)		Flávio Caça-Rato 63'	Stadium: Estádio Luiz José de Lacerda (Lacerdão); Attendance: 5,216; Referee: Cláudio Mercante

14 April 2013 11	Santa Cruz	2–2	Sport	Recife
16:00 (UTC-3)	Raul 43'; Dênis Marques 55'	Report	Roger 50'; Marcos Aurélio 90'	Stadium: Estádio José do Rego Maciel (Arruda); Attendance: 33,063; Referee: Gilberto Castro Júnior

==== Semi-finals ====
21 April 2013	Santa Cruz	1–0	Náutico	Recife
16:00 (UTC-3)	Renatinho 51'	Report		Stadium: Estádio José do Rego Maciel (Arruda); Attendance: 28,275; Referee: Gleydson Leite

28 April 2013	Náutico	2–1	Santa Cruz	Recife
16:00 (UTC-3)	Élton 15', 84'	Report	Dênis Marques 78'	Stadium: Estádio Eládio de Barros Carvalho (Aflitos); Attendance: 15,013; Referee: Gilberto Castro Júnior

==== Finals ====
5 May 2013	Santa Cruz	1–0	Sport	Recife
16:00 (UTC-3)	Dênis Marques 39'	Report		Stadium: Estádio José do Rego Maciel (Arruda); Attendance: 38,201; Referee: Nielson Nogueira Dias

12 May 2013	Sport	0–2	Santa Cruz	Recife
16:00 (UTC-3)		Report	Flávio Caça-Rato 25'; Sandro Manoel 85'	Stadium: Estádio Adelmar da Costa Carvalho (Ilha do Retiro); Attendance: 26,806; Referee: Gilberto Castro Júnior

==== Record ====
Final Position	Points	Matches	Wins	Draws	Losses	Goals For	Goals Away	Avg%
1st	30	15	9	3	3	20	10	66%

=== Copa do Brasil ===
==== First round ====
3 April 2013	Guarani de Juazeiro	1–2	Santa Cruz	Juazeiro do Norte
20:30 (UTC-3)	Gustavo 60'	Report	Luciano Sorriso 14'; Raul 51'	Stadium: Estádio Mauro Sampaio; Attendance: 1,745; Referee: Renan Roberto de Souza

10 April 2013	Santa Cruz	2–0	Guarani de Juazeiro	Recife
20:30 (UTC-3)	Denis Marques 13' (pen.); Everton Sena 17'	Report		Stadium: Estádio José do Rego Maciel (Arruda); Attendance: 7,087; Referee: Charles Hebert Cavalcante Ferreira

==== Second round ====
1 May 2013	Santa Cruz	0–0	Internacional	Recife
21:50 (UTC-3)		Report		Stadium: Estádio José do Rego Maciel (Arruda); Attendance: 15,072; Referee: Arilson Bispo da Anunciação

15 May 2013	Internacional	2–0	Santa Cruz	Caxias do Sul
22:00 (UTC-3)	D'Alessandro 58'; Caio 82'	Report		Stadium: Estádio Francisco Stédile (Centenário); Attendance: 2,957; Referee: Antônio Denival de Morais

==== Record ====
Final Position	Points	Matches	Wins	Draws	Losses	Goals For	Goals Away	Avg%
28th	7	4	2	1	1	4	3	58%

=== Série C ===
==== First stage ====
2 June 2013 1	Santa Cruz	2–0	Luverdense	Recife
18:30 (UTC-3)	Júlio Terceiro 3' (o.g.); Júnior Xuxa 56'	Report		Stadium: Estádio José do Rego Maciel (Arruda); Attendance: 19,984; Referee: Manoel Nunes Lopo Garrido

9 June 2013 2	CRB	2–1	Santa Cruz	Maceió
19:00 (UTC-3)	Denílson 70'; Zé Paulo 88'	Report	Luciano Sorriso 15'	Stadium: Estádio Rei Pelé; Attendance: 4,464; Referee: Eduardo de Santana Nunes

7 July 2013 3	Santa Cruz	1–0	Cuiabá	Recife
19:00 (UTC-3)	Flávio Caça-Rato 28'	Report		Stadium: Estádio José do Rego Maciel (Arruda); Attendance: 18,550; Referee: Charles Hebert Cavalcante Ferreira

13 July 2013 4	Santa Cruz	2–1	Fortaleza	Recife
16:00 (UTC-3)	Raul 45+1', 79'	Report	Assisinho 22'	Stadium: Estádio José do Rego Maciel (Arruda); Attendance: 26,252; Referee: Cláudio Francisco Lima e Silva

21 July 2013 5	Águia de Marabá	1–1	Santa Cruz	Marabá
16:00 (UTC-3)	Danillo Galvão 72'	Report	Flávio Caça-Rato 50'	Stadium: Estádio Municipal Zinho de Oliveira; Attendance: 1,182; Referee: Rodrigo Batista Raposo

28 July 2013 6	Santa Cruz	0–2	Baraúnas	Recife
19:00 (UTC-3)		Report	Radamés 30', 68'	Stadium: Estádio José do Rego Maciel (Arruda); Attendance: 21,213; Referee: Manoel Nunes Lopo Garrido

31 July 2013 7	Santa Cruz	4–0	Rio Branco	Recife
20:30 (UTC-3)	Renan Fonseca 21'; Renatinho 35'; Dênis Marques 48'; Natan 62'	Report		Stadium: Estádio José do Rego Maciel (Arruda); Attendance: 14,552; Referee: Leandro Saraiva Dantas de Oliveira

3 August 2013 8	Sampaio Corrêa	3–0	Santa Cruz	São Luís
16:00 (UTC-3)	Tiago Cavalcanti 9', 40'; Eloir 90+1'	Report		Stadium: Estádio Governador João Castelo (Castelão); Attendance: 24,420; Referee: Alinor Silva da Paixão

7 August 2013 9	Brasiliense	0–0	Santa Cruz	Taguatinga
19:00 (UTC-3)		Report		Stadium: Elmo Serejo Farias (Boca do Jacaré); Attendance: 1,476; Referee: Valdicleuson Silva da Costa

10 August 2013 10	Santa Cruz	6–0	Treze	Recife
19:00 (UTC-3)	Dênis Marques 27', 67', 80'; Raul 31'; Flávio Caça-Rato 38'; Sandro Manoel 87'	Report		Stadium: Estádio José do Rego Maciel (Arruda); Attendance: 15,165; Referee: Rogério Lima da Rocha

18 August 2013 11	Luverdense	3–1	Santa Cruz	Lucas do Rio Verde
17:00 (UTC-3)	Tozin 19', 66'; Edinho 76'	Report	Natan 24'	Stadium: Estádio Municipal Passo das Emas; Attendance: 2,077; Referee: Paulo H Schleich Vollkopf

24 August 2013 12	Santa Cruz	0–0	CRB	Recife
16:00 (UTC-3)		Report		Stadium: Estádio José do Rego Maciel (Arruda); Attendance: 19,995; Referee: Cláudio Francisco Lima e Silva

1 September 2013 13	Cuiabá	1–3	Santa Cruz	Cuiabá
17:00 (UTC-3)	Igor 3'	Report	Luciano Sorriso 33'; André Dias 39', 44'	Stadium: Estádio Eurico Gaspar Dutra; Attendance: 478; Referee: Eduardo Tomaz de Aquino Valadão

8 September 2013 14	Fortaleza	2–0	Santa Cruz	Fortaleza
19:00 (UTC-3)	Ruan 48', 58'	Report		Stadium: Estádio Presidente Vargas; Attendance: 14,374; Referee: Rodrigo Nunes de Sá

15 September 2013 15	Santa Cruz	3–2	Águia de Marabá	Recife
16:00 (UTC-3)	Everton Heleno 8'; André Dias 55'; Dênis Marques 79'	Report	Keno 25'; Mael 90'	Stadium: Estádio José do Rego Maciel (Arruda); Attendance: 29,628; Referee: Marcos André Gomes da Penha

22 September 2013 16	Baraúnas	1–3	Santa Cruz	Goianinha
16:00 (UTC-3)	índio 42'	Report	André Dias 6'; Raul 66'; Luciano Sorriso 90+2'	Stadium: Estádio José Nazareno do Nascimento (Nazarenão); Attendance: 2,222; Referee: Antônio Dib Moraes de Sousa

29 September 2013 17	Santa Cruz	0–0	Sampaio Corrêa	Recife
19:00 (UTC-3)		Report		Stadium: Estádio José do Rego Maciel (Arruda); Attendance: 38,434; Referee: Guilherme Ceretta de Lima

3 October 2013 18	Rio Branco	0–2	Santa Cruz	Rio Branco
19:30 (UTC-5)		Report	André Dias 12'; Raul 38'	Stadium: Estádio Antônio Aquino Lopes (Florestão); Attendance: 152; Referee: Edmar Campos da Encarnação

6 October 2013 19	Santa Cruz	2–0	Brasiliense	Recife
19:00 (UTC-3)	Renan Fonseca 15'; Oziel 90'	Report		Stadium: Estádio José do Rego Maciel (Arruda); Attendance: 38,780; Referee: Paulo H Godoy Bezerra

13 October 2013 20	Treze	1–0	Santa Cruz	Campina Grande
16:00 (UTC-3)	Giancarlo 90'	Report		Stadium: Estádio Presidente Vargas; Attendance: 5,787; Referee: Jean Pierre Goncalves Lima

==== Quarter-finals ====
27 October 2013	Ipatinga	0–1	Santa Cruz	Nova Serrana
17:00 (UTC-3)		Report	Tiago Costa 2'	Stadium: Estádio Senador Zezé Perrella (Arena do Calçado); Attendance: 376; Referee: Jean Pierre Goncalves Lima

3 November 2013	Santa Cruz	2–1	Ipatinga	Recife
17:00 (UTC-3)	André Dias 57'; Flávio Caça-Rato 88'	Report	Max 64'	Stadium: Estádio José do Rego Maciel (Arruda); Attendance: 60.000; Referee: Dewson Fernando Freitas da Silva

==== Semi-finals ====
10 November 2013	Luverdense	0–2	Santa Cruz	Lucas do Rio Verde
17:00 (UTC-3)		Report	Renatinho 63'; André Dias 77'	Stadium: Estádio Municipal Passo das Emas; Attendance: 2,113; Referee: Marcos Mateus Pereira

17 November 2013	Santa Cruz	2–1	Luverdense	Recife
17:00 (UTC-3)	Renatinho 9'; André Dias 52'	Report	Samuel 11'	Stadium: Estádio José do Rego Maciel (Arruda); Attendance: 29,519; Referee: Luiz Flavio de Oliveira

==== Finals ====
24 November 2013	Sampaio Corrêa	0–0	Santa Cruz	São Luís
17:00 (UTC-3)		Report		Stadium: Estádio Governador João Castelo (Castelão); Attendance: 25,901; Referee: Guilherme Ceretta de Lima

1 December 2013	Santa Cruz	2–1	Sampaio Corrêa	Recife
17:00 (UTC-3)	Dedé 33'; Flávio Caça-Rato 46'	Report	Cleitinho 55'	Stadium: Estádio José do Rego Maciel (Arruda); Attendance: 33,887; Referee: Luiz Flavio de Oliveira

==== Record ====
Final Position	Points	Matches	Wins	Draws	Losses	Goals For	Goals Away	Avg%
1st	50	26	15	5	6	40	22	64%
