= 2014 Santa Cruz Futebol Clube season =

Santa Cruz
2014 season
- Chairman: Antônio Luiz Neto
- Manager: Vica; Ataíde Macedo (c); Sérgio Guedes; Adriano Teixeira (c); Oliveira Canindé
- Stadium: Estádio do Arruda
- Série B: 9th
- Copa do Brasil: Third round
- Copa do Nordeste: Semi-finals
- Pernambucano: 4th
- Top goalscorer: League: Léo Gamalho (13); All: Léo Gamalho (31)
Home colours	Away colours	Third colours

The 2014 season was Santa Cruz's 101st season in the club's history. Santa Cruz competed in the Campeonato Pernambucano, Copa do Nordeste, Copa do Brasil and Série B.

== Squad ==
Note: Flags indicate national team as defined under FIFA eligibility rules; some limited exceptions apply. Players may hold more than one non-FIFA nationality.

No.	Pos.	Nation	Player
1	GK	BRA	Tiago Cardoso (captain)
2	DF	BRA	Oziel
3	DF	BRA	Everton Sena
4	DF	BRA	Renan Fonseca
5	MF	BRA	Sandro Manoel
6	DF	BRA	Tiago Costa
7	MF	BRA	Carlos Alberto
8	MF	BRA	Danilo Pires
9	FW	BRA	Léo Gamalho
10	MF	BRA	Natan
11	FW	BRA	Wescley
12	GK	BRA	Fred
13	DF	BRA	Nininho
14	DF	BRA	Leandro Souza
15	DF	BRA	Julinho
16	MF	BRA	Memo
17	FW	BRA	Flávio Caça-Rato

No.	Pos.	Nation	Player
18	FW	BRA	Cassiano
19	FW	BRA	Betinho
20	FW	BRA	Adilson
21	MF	BRA	Renatinho
22	DF	BRA	Tony
23	FW	BRA	Pingo
25	MF	BRA	Éverton
26	MF	BRA	Luciano Sorriso
27	DF	BRA	Patrick
31	MF	BRA	Raniel
32	DF	BRA	Marllon
33	DF	BRA	Zeca
38	MF	BRA	Emerson Santos
39	FW	BRA	Netto Imperador
40	GK	BRA	Cley
—	MF	BRA	Bileu
—	FW	BRA	Keno

== Statistics ==
=== Overall ===
Games played	68 (10 Copa do Nordeste, 14 Pernambucano, 6 Copa do Brasil, 38 Série B)
Games won	27 (5 Copa do Nordeste, 5 Pernambucano, 3 Copa do Brasil, 14 Série B)
Games drawn	22 (2 Copa do Nordeste, 5 Pernambucano, 2 Copa do Brasil, 13 Série B)
Games lost	19 (3 Copa do Nordeste, 4 Pernambucano, 1 Copa do Brasil, 11 Série B)
Goals scored	102
Goals conceded	71
Goal difference	+31
Best results (goal difference)	7–0 (H) v Salgueiro – Pernambucano – 2014.03.09
Worst result (goal difference)	1–4 (A) v Vasco da Gama – Série B – 2014.07.15
Top scorer	Léo Gamalho (31)

Source: Santa Cruz official website

=== Goalscorers ===
Place	Position	Nationality	Number	Name	Copa do Nordeste	Campeonato Pernambucano	Copa do Brasil	Série B	Total
1	FW	(Brazil)	9	Léo Gamalho	1	12	5	13	31
2	FW	(Brazil)	19	Betinho	0	3	1	3	7
2	MF	(Brazil)	8	Danilo Pires	0	0	0	7	7
2	MF	(Brazil)	11	Wescley	0	0	0	7	7
3	FW	(Brazil)	23	Pingo	0	1	1	3	5
3	DF	(Brazil)	4	Renan Fonseca	3	1	0	1	5
4	FW	(Brazil)	18	Cassiano	2	1	0	1	4
4	DF	(Brazil)	3	Everton Sena	0	1	1	2	4
4	FW	(Brazil)	17	Flávio Caça-Rato	0	2	1	1	4
5	MF	(Brazil)	7	Carlos Alberto	0	1	1	1	3
5	MF	(Brazil)	7	Keno	0	0	0	3	3
5	MF	(Brazil)	26	Luciano Sorriso	1	1	0	1	3
5	MF	(Brazil)	20	Raul	3	0	0	0	3
6	MF	(Brazil)	18	Jefferson Maranhão	0	2	0	0	2
6	DF	(Brazil)	13	Nininho	0	1	0	1	2
6	MF	(Brazil)	21	Renatinho	0	1	0	1	2
6	DF	(Brazil)	22	Tony	0	0	0	2	2
7	FW	(Brazil)	20	Adilson	0	0	0	1	1
7	MF	(Brazil)	38	Emerson Santos	0	0	0	1	1
7	MF	(Brazil)	16	Memo	0	0	0	1	1
7	MF	(Brazil)	10	Natan	1	0	0	0	1
7	DF	(Brazil)	15	Panda	1	0	0	0	1
7	DF	(Brazil)	3	Rafael Alemão	0	0	0	1	1
7	DF	(Brazil)	6	Tiago Costa	1	0	0	0	1
				Own goals	0	1	0	0	1
				Total	13	28	10	51	102

== Competitions ==
=== Copa do Nordeste ===
==== Group stage ====
18 January 2014 1	Santa Cruz	3–2	Vitória da Conquista	Caruaru
17:30 (UTC-3)	Natan 3'; Raul 25'; Renan Fonseca 71'	Report	Tatu 36'; Kattê 87'	Stadium: Estádio Luiz José de Lacerda (Lacerdão); Attendance: 3,673; Referee: Leandro Saraiva Dantas de Oliveira

22 January 2014 2	Bahia	1–1	Santa Cruz	Salvador
22:15 (UTC-3)	Rhayner 26'	Report	Tiago Costa 76'	Stadium: Arena Fonte Nova; Attendance: 7,408; Referee: Renan Roberto de Souza

25 January 2014 3	Santa Cruz	0–1	CSA	Caruaru
17:00 (UTC-3)		Report	Josimar 79'	Stadium: Estádio Luiz José de Lacerda (Lacerdão); Attendance: 3,325; Referee: Caio Max Augusto Vieira

30 January 2014 4	CSA	1–1	Santa Cruz	Maceió
20:15 (UTC-3)	Josimar 47'	Report	Raul 26'	Stadium: Estádio Rei Pelé; Attendance: 12,006; Referee: Avelar Rodrigo da Silva

2 February 2014 5	Santa Cruz	2–1	Bahia	Caruaru
17:00 (UTC-3)	Luciano Sorriso 1'; Raul 49'	Report	Rhayner 62'	Stadium: Estádio Luiz José de Lacerda (Lacerdão); Attendance: 7,390; Referee: Cláudio Francisco Lima e Silva

5 February 2014 6	Vitória da Conquista	0–1	Santa Cruz	Vitória da Conquista
22:15 (UTC-3)		Report	Renan Fonseca 71'	Stadium: Estádio Municipal Lomanto Júnior; Attendance: 226; Referee: Wladyerisson Silva Oliveira

==== Quarter-finals ====
15 February 2014	Santa Cruz	3–0	Guarany de Sobral	Recife
18:00 (UTC-3)	Renan Fonseca 8'; Panda 66'; Cassiano 68'	Report		Stadium: Estádio José do Rego Maciel (Arruda); Attendance: 14,446; Referee: Suelson Diorgenes de França Medeiros

26 February 2014	Guarany de Sobral	0–1	Santa Cruz	Sobral
22:00 (UTC-3)		Report	Cassiano 84'	Stadium: Estádio Municipal Plácido Aderaldo Castelo (Junco); Attendance: 1,445; Referee: Italo Medeiros de Azevedo

==== Semi-finals ====
12 March 2014	Sport	2–0	Santa Cruz	Recife
22:00 (UTC-3)	Neto Baiano 21'; Felipe Azevedo 46'	Report		Stadium: Estádio Adelmar da Costa Carvalho (Ilha do Retiro); Attendance: 10,326; Referee: Gilberto Rodrigues Castro Junior

19 March 2014	Santa Cruz	1–2	Sport	Recife
22:00 (UTC-3)	Léo Gamalho 47'	Report	Rithely 44'; Patric 55'	Stadium: Estádio José do Rego Maciel (Arruda); Attendance: 15,501; Referee: Sandro Meira Ricci

==== Record ====
Final Position	Points	Matches	Wins	Draws	Losses	Goals For	Goals Away	Avg%
4th	17	10	5	2	3	13	10	56%

=== Campeonato Pernambucano ===
==== First stage ====
9 February 2014 1	Santa Cruz	4–2	Central	Recife
16:00 (UTC-3)	Léo Gamalho 17', 38'; Cassiano 55'; Pingo 69'	Report	Johnathan Goiano 25'; Fernando Pires 36'	Stadium: Estádio José do Rego Maciel (Arruda); Attendance: 8,009; Referee: Cláudio Mercante

12 February 2014 3	Porto	1–0	Santa Cruz	Caruaru
21:15 (UTC-3)	Kiros 72'	Report		Stadium: Estádio Luiz José de Lacerda (Lacerdão); Attendance: 1,852; Referee: Gleydson Leite

19 February 2014 2*	Santa Cruz	0–0	Náutico	Recife
20:30 (UTC-3)		Report		Stadium: Estádio José do Rego Maciel (Arruda); Attendance: 28,712; Referee: Emerson Sobral

23 February 2014 4	Salgueiro	1–1	Santa Cruz	Salgueiro
16:00 (UTC-3)	Aylton Alemão 43'	Report	Nininho 84'	Stadium: Estádio Cornélio de Barros (Salgueirão); Attendance: 8,732; Referee: Gilberto Castro Júnior

6 March 2014 5	Sport	3–0	Santa Cruz	Recife
20:30 (UTC-3)	Felipe Azevedo 5', 29'; Patric 16'	Report		Stadium: Estádio Adelmar da Costa Carvalho (Ilha do Retiro); Attendance: 18,033; Referee: Sandro Meira Ricci

9 March 2014 6	Santa Cruz	7–0	Salgueiro	Recife
16:00 (UTC-3)	Carlos Alberto 7'; Flávio Caça-Rato 10', 33'; Everton Sena 41'; Léo Gamalho 57' (pen.), 60', 78'	Report		Stadium: Estádio José do Rego Maciel (Arruda); Attendance: 11,921; Referee: Luiz Cláudio Sobral

15 March 2014 7	Santa Cruz	4–0	Porto	São Lourenço da Mata
19:30 (UTC-3)	Léo Gamalho 37' (pen.); Luciano Sorriso 42'; Jefferson Maranhão 85', 87'	Report		Stadium: Estádio Governador Carlos Wilson Campos (Arena Pernambuco); Attendance: 14,819; Referee: Gilberto Freire

23 March 2014 8	Náutico	3–5	Santa Cruz	São Lourenço da Mata
16:00 (UTC-3)	Hugo Cabral 3'; Elicarlos 86'; William Alves 87'	Report	Renan Fonseca 23'; Izaldo 34' (o.g.); Léo Gamalho 42', 51'; Betinho 68'	Stadium: Estádio Governador Carlos Wilson Campos (Arena Pernambuco); Attendance: 15,683; Referee: Gilberto Castro Júnior

26 March 2014 9	Santa Cruz	1–1	Sport	Recife
22:00 (UTC-3)	Léo Gamalho 39'	Report	Ewerton Páscoa 80'	Stadium: Estádio José do Rego Maciel (Arruda); Attendance: 13,489; Referee: Sebastião Rufino Filho

30 March 2014 10	Central	1–1	Santa Cruz	Caruaru
16:00 (UTC-3)	Erivélton 15'	Report	Betinho 68'	Stadium: Estádio Luiz José de Lacerda (Lacerdão); Attendance: 8,763; Referee: Luiz Cláudio Sobral

==== Semi-finals ====
6 April 2014	Santa Cruz	3–0	Sport	Recife
16:00 (UTC-3)	Léo Gamalho 55', 86'; Renatinho 77'	Report		Stadium: Estádio José do Rego Maciel (Arruda); Attendance: 28,366; Referee: Gilberto Castro Júnior

13 April 2014	Sport	1–0 (5–3 p)	Santa Cruz	Recife
16:00 (UTC-3)	Leonardo 86'	Report		Stadium: Estádio Adelmar da Costa Carvalho (Ilha do Retiro); Attendance: 23,721; Referee: Sebastião Rufino Filho
	Penalties
	Leonardo (penalty scored); Renan Oliveira (penalty scored); Patric (penalty scored); Ewerton Páscoa (penalty scored); Neto Baiano (penalty scored)		(penalty scored) Léo Gamalho; (penalty scored) Renan Fonseca; (penalty scored) Sandro Manoel; (penalty missed) Carlos Alberto

==== Matches for the Third Place ====
16 April 2014	Salgueiro	1–1	Santa Cruz	Salgueiro
20:00 (UTC-3)	Kanu 6'	Report	Betinho 72'	Stadium: Estádio Cornélio de Barros (Salgueirão); Attendance: 7,370; Referee: Emerson Sobral

22 April 2014	Santa Cruz	1–2	Salgueiro	Recife
20:00 (UTC-3)	Léo Gamalho 80'	Report	Kanu 45'; Ceará 87'	Stadium: Estádio José do Rego Maciel (Arruda); Attendance: 4,820; Referee: Gilberto Castro Júnior

==== Record ====
Final Position	Points	Matches	Wins	Draws	Losses	Goals For	Goals Away	Avg%
4th	20	14	5	5	4	28	16	47%

=== Copa do Brasil ===
==== First round ====
9 April 2014	Lagarto	0–1	Santa Cruz	Itabaiana
20:30 (UTC-3)		Report	Carlos Alberto 10'	Stadium: Estádio Presidente Médici; Attendance: 142; Referee: José Reinaldo Figueiredo da Silva Filho

7 May 2014	Santa Cruz	3–1	Lagarto	Recife
22:00 (UTC-3)	Flávio Caça-Rato 45'; Léo Gamalho 75'; Everton Sena 87'	Report	Jussimar 71'	Stadium: Estádio Eládio de Barros Carvalho (Aflitos); Attendance: 0 Referee: Avelar Rodrigo da Silva

==== Second round ====
14 May 2014	Botafogo–PB	1–1	Santa Cruz	João Pessoa
22:00 (UTC-3)	Lenílson 21'	Report	Pingo 15'	Stadium: Estádio José Américo de Almeida Filho (Almeidão); Attendance: 4,456; Referee: Ranilton Oliveira de Sousa

23 July 2014	Santa Cruz	2–1	Botafogo–PB	Recife
22:00 (UTC-3)	Léo Gamalho 21', 78'	Report	Lenílson 45'	Stadium: Estádio José do Rego Maciel (Arruda); Attendance: 0 Referee: Jefferson Schmidt

==== Third round ====
6 August 2014	Santa Rita	3–2	Santa Cruz	Maceió
22:00 (UTC-3)	Tinga 38'; Rafael Silva 66'; Reinaldo Alagoano 78' (pen.)	Report	Léo Gamalho 50', 59'	Stadium: Estádio Rei Pelé; Attendance: 581; Referee: Devarly Lira do Rosário

14 August 2014	Santa Cruz	1–1	Santa Rita	Recife
19:30 (UTC-3)	Betinho 81'	Report	Rafael Silva 3'	Stadium: Estádio José do Rego Maciel (Arruda); Attendance: 9,750; Referee: Italo Medeiros de Azevedo

==== Record ====
Final Position	Points	Matches	Wins	Draws	Losses	Goals For	Goals Away	Avg%
19th	11	6	3	2	1	10	7	63%

=== Série B ===
19 April 2014 1	Santa Cruz	1–1	ABC	Recife
16:20 (UTC-3)	Betinho 20'	Report	Dênis Marques 53'	Stadium: Estádio José do Rego Maciel (Arruda); Attendance: 10,024; Referee: Grazianni Maciel Rocha

26 April 2014 2	Portuguesa	1–1	Santa Cruz	São Paulo
16:20 (UTC-3)	Rudnei 62'	Report	Flávio Caça-Rato 67'	Stadium: Estádio Oswaldo Teixeira Duarte (Canindé); Attendance: 1,367; Referee: Rodrigo Batista Raposo

2 May 2014 3	Santa Cruz	1–1	Paraná	Recife
21:00 (UTC-3)	Luciano Sorriso 23'	Report	Marcos Serrato 27'	Stadium: Estádio José do Rego Maciel (Arruda); Attendance: 8,029; Referee: Wilton Pereira Sampaio

10 May 2014 4	Santa Cruz	0–0	Luverdense	São Lourenço da Mata
16:20 (UTC-3)		Report		Stadium: Estádio Governador Carlos Wilson Campos (Arena Pernambuco); Attendance: 13,010; Referee: Renan Roberto de Souza

17 May 2014 5	Icasa	1–1	Santa Cruz	Juazeiro do Norte
16:20 (UTC-3)	Zé Carlos 60'	Report	Carlos Alberto 50'	Stadium: Estádio Mauro Sampaio (Romeirão); Attendance: 2,735; Referee: Paulo Sergio Santos Moreira

20 May 2014 6	Oeste	1–1	Santa Cruz	Itápolis
19:30 (UTC-3)	Denis Neves 20'	Report	Everton Sena 18'	Stadium: Estádio Municipal dos Amaros; Attendance: 560; Referee: Braulio da Silva Machado

23 May 2014 7	Santa Cruz	1–1	América–MG	Recife
19:30 (UTC-3)	Danilo Pires 52'	Report	Willians Santana 68'	Stadium: Estádio Eládio de Barros Carvalho (Aflitos); Attendance: 0 Referee: Rodolpho Toski Marques

27 May 2014 8	Boa Esporte	0–2	Santa Cruz	Varginha
19:30 (UTC-3)		Report	Nininho 43'; Betinho 77'	Stadium: Estádio Municipal Prefeito Dilson Luiz de Melo (Melão); Attendance: 663; Referee: Braulio da Silva Machado

30 May 2014 9	Santa Cruz	2–0	Joinville	Recife
21:50 (UTC-3)	Memo 15'; Betinho 55'	Report		Stadium: Estádio Eládio de Barros Carvalho (Aflitos); Attendance: 9,884; Referee: Marcelo de Lima Henrique

3 June 2014 10	Santa Cruz	2–1	Ponte Preta	Recife
19:30 (UTC-3)	Renatinho 8'; Pingo 32'	Report	Jonathan Cafú 90+2'	Stadium: Estádio José do Rego Maciel (Arruda); Attendance: 15,759; Referee: Cleisson Veloso Pereira

15 July 2014 11	Vasco da Gama	4–1	Santa Cruz	Cuiabá
21:50 (UTC-3)	Fabrício 34', 75'; Douglas Silva 41'; Kléber 65'	Report	Danilo Pires 18'	Stadium: Arena Pantanal; Attendance: 7,190; Referee: Anderson Daronco

19 July 2014 12	Vila Nova	3–2	Santa Cruz	Goiânia
16:20 (UTC-3)	Jheimy 8'; Radamés 28'; Paulo José 76'	Report	Pingo 15'; Danilo Pires 35'	Stadium: Estádio do Governo do Estado de Goiás (Serra Dourada); Attendance: 1,780; Referee: Antônio Neuriclaudio R. Costa

26 July 2014 13	Santa Cruz	2–3	Ceará	Recife
16:20 (UTC-3)	Wescley 27'; Léo Gamalho 29'	Report	Bill 22'; Magno Alves 39'; Sandro 45+1'	Stadium: Estádio José do Rego Maciel (Arruda); Attendance: 17,248; Referee: André Luiz de Freitas Castro

2 August 2014 14	América–RN	0–1	Santa Cruz	Natal
16:20 (UTC-3)		Report	Léo Gamalho 32'	Stadium: Arena das Dunas; Attendance: 8,967; Referee: Paulo H Godoy Bezerra

9 August 2014 15	Santa Cruz	3–0	Náutico	Recife
16:20 (UTC-3)	Keno 57'; Wescley 73', 90+3'	Report		Stadium: Estádio José do Rego Maciel (Arruda); Attendance: 20,717; Referee: Pericles Bassols Pegado Cortez

19 August 2014 17	Sampaio Corrêa	0–0	Santa Cruz	São Luís
19:30 (UTC-3)		Report		Stadium: Estádio Governador João Castelo (Castelão); Attendance: 9,840; Referee: Leandro Pedro Vuaden

23 August 2014 18	Avaí	0–0	Santa Cruz	Florianópolis
16:10 (UTC-3)		Report		Stadium: Estádio Aderbal Ramos da Silva (Ressacada); Attendance: 6,832; Referee: Ricardo Marques Ribeiro

29 August 2014 19	Santa Cruz	2–0	Atlético Goianiense	Recife
20:30 (UTC-3)	Wescley 8'; Pingo 90+2'	Report		Stadium: Estádio José do Rego Maciel (Arruda); Attendance: 12,523; Referee: Arilson Bispo da Anunciação

6 September 2014 20	ABC	2–1	Santa Cruz	Natal
16:10 (UTC-3)	Somália 4', 48'	Report	Léo Gamalho 72'	Stadium: Arena das Dunas; Attendance: 5,689; Referee: Francisco de Paula dos Santos Silva Neto

9 September 2014 21	Santa Cruz	1–0	Portuguesa	Recife
19:30 (UTC-3)	Léo Gamalho 87'	Report		Stadium: Estádio José do Rego Maciel (Arruda); Attendance: 9,107; Referee: Antônio Denival de Morais

13 September 2014 22	Paraná	3–2	Santa Cruz	Curitiba
16:10 (UTC-3)	Adaílton 43'; Tiago Alves 69'; Jean 85'	Report	Wescley 2'; Léo Gamalho 67'	Stadium: Estádio Durival Britto e Silva (Vila Capanema); Attendance: 4,844; Referee: Rodrigo Nunes de Sá

16 September 2014 23	Luverdense	2–1	Santa Cruz	Lucas do Rio Verde
21:50 (UTC-3)	Rubinho 47'; Léo 78'	Report	Tony 13'	Stadium: Estádio Municipal Passo das Emas; Attendance: 824; Referee: Edivaldo Elias da Silva

20 September 2014 24	Santa Cruz	1–1	Icasa	Recife
16:10 (UTC-3)	Léo Gamalho 10'	Report	Lucas Gomes 14'	Stadium: Estádio José do Rego Maciel (Arruda); Attendance: 10,259; Referee: Antônio Neuriclaudio R. Costa

23 September 2014 25	Santa Cruz	3–0	Oeste	Recife
21:50 (UTC-3)	Léo Gamalho 42', 69'; Keno 87'	Report		Stadium: Estádio José do Rego Maciel (Arruda); Attendance: 6,477; Referee: Fabio Filipus

27 September 2014 26	América–MG	1–0	Santa Cruz	Belo Horizonte
16:10 (UTC-3)	Elsinho 20'	Report		Stadium: Estádio Raimundo Sampaio (Independência); Attendance: 2,095; Referee: Pablo dos Santos Alves

3 October 2014 27	Santa Cruz	3–0	Boa Esporte	São Lourenço da Mata
19:30 (UTC-3)	Wescley 22'; Danilo Pires 23'; Léo Gamalho 39'	Report		Stadium: Estádio Governador Carlos Wilson Campos (Arena Pernambuco); Attendance: 11,055; Referee: Luiz Flávio de Oliveira

7 October 2014 28	Joinville	1–1	Santa Cruz	Joinville
21:50 (UTC-3)	Edigar Junio 63'	Report	Danilo Pires 53'	Stadium: Arena Joinville; Attendance: 6,903; Referee: André Luiz de Freitas Castro

11 October 2014 29	Ponte Preta	1–1	Santa Cruz	Campinas
16:10 (UTC-3)	Jonathan Cafú 68'	Report	Everton Sena 20'	Stadium: Estádio Moisés Lucarelli; Attendance: 8,609; Referee: Devarly Lira do Rosário

14 October 2014 16*	Santa Cruz	2–1	Bragantino	Recife
19:30 (UTC-3)	Wescley 35'; Rafael Alemão 49'	Report	Léo Jaime 90+2'	Stadium: Estádio José do Rego Maciel (Arruda); Attendance: 12,897; Referee: Jean Pierre Goncalves Lima

18 October 2014 30	Santa Cruz	1–0	Vasco da Gama	São Lourenço da Mata
16:10 (UTC-3)	Cassiano 85'	Report		Stadium: Estádio Governador Carlos Wilson Campos (Arena Pernambuco); Attendance: 24,283; Referee: Leandro Pedro Vuaden

28 October 2014 31	Santa Cruz	5–1	Vila Nova	São Lourenço da Mata
19:30 (UTC-3)	Renan Fonseca 34'; Danilo Pires 37'; Léo Gamalho 41', 60'; Keno 62'	Report	Leonardo Gomes 54'	Stadium: Estádio Governador Carlos Wilson Campos (Arena Pernambuco); Attendance: 17,979; Referee: Eduardo Cordeiro Guimarães

24 October 2014 32	Ceará	0–2	Santa Cruz	Fortaleza
21:50 (UTC-3)		Report	Tony 11'; Adilson 86'	Stadium: Estádio Governador Plácido Castelo (Castelão); Attendance: 10,247; Referee: Marcelo Aparecido R de Souza

1 November 2014 33	Santa Cruz	0–1	América–RN	São Lourenço da Mata
17:20 (UTC-3)		Report	Max 79'	Stadium: Estádio Governador Carlos Wilson Campos (Arena Pernambuco); Attendance: 34,746; Referee: Francisco Carlos do Nascimento

8 November 2014 34	Náutico	0–0	Santa Cruz	São Lourenço da Mata
17:20 (UTC-3)		Report		Stadium: Estádio Governador Carlos Wilson Campos (Arena Pernambuco); Attendance: 10,947; Referee: Marielson Alves Silva

15 November 2014 35	Bragantino	2–1	Santa Cruz	Bragança Paulista
17:20 (UTC-3)	Léo Jaime 40'; Geandro 65'	Report	Danilo Pires 4'	Stadium: Estádio Nabi Abi Chedid; Attendance: 6,241; Referee: Diego Almeida Real

18 November 2014 36	Santa Cruz	0–2	Sampaio Corrêa	Recife
21:50 (UTC-3)		Report	Válber 48'; Luiz Otávio 68'	Stadium: Estádio José do Rego Maciel (Arruda); Attendance: 14,609; Referee: Pablo dos Santos Alves

22 November 2014 37	Santa Cruz	0–1	Avaí	Recife
17:20 (UTC-3)		Report	Marquinhos 18'	Stadium: Estádio José do Rego Maciel (Arruda); Attendance: 7,289; Referee: Marcelo de Lima Henrique

29 November 2014 38	Atlético Goianiense	2–3	Santa Cruz	Recife
16:20 (UTC-3)	Júnior Viçosa 47'; Josimar 89'	Report	Léo Gamalho 53', 61'; Emerson Santos 90+4'	Stadium: Estádio José do Rego Maciel (Arruda); Attendance: 5,323; Referee: Vinicius Furlan

==== Record ====
Final Position	Points	Matches	Wins	Draws	Losses	Goals For	Goals Away	Avg%
9th	55	38	14	13	11	51	38	48%
