= Leandro Souza =

Leandro Souza may refer to:

- Leandro Souza (footballer, born 1986), Brazilian football centre-back
- Leandro Souza (footballer, born 1987), Brazilian football forward
