= Nininho =

Nininho is a Portuguese-language nickname. It may refer to:

- Nininho (footballer, 1923–1997), Antônio Francisco, Brazilian football striker
- Nininho (footballer, born 1992), Salatiel Bartolomeu De Paiva Filho, Brazilian football right-back
- Nininho Vaz Maia (born 1988), Avelino Vaz Maia, Portuguese flamenco pop singer
- Otávio Fantoni (1907–1935), Brazilian–Italian football player
