= Emerson Santos =

Emerson Santos may refer to:

- Emerson Santos (footballer, born 1992), Brazilian football attacking midfielder
- Emerson Santos (footballer, born 1995), Brazilian football centre-back
