= Tiago Costa =

Tiago Costa may refer to:

- Tiago Costa (Portuguese footballer) (born 1985), Portuguese football right-back
- Tiago Costa (Brazilian footballer) (born 1987), Brazilian football left-back
