= Paulo César (footballer, born 1980) =

Brazilian footballer (born 1980)

Personal information
- Full name: Paulo César Rocha Rosa
- Date of birth: 5 January 1980 (age 46)
- Place of birth: São Luís, Brazil
- Height: 1.75 m (5 ft 9 in)
- Position: Forward

Senior career*
Years	Team	Apps	(Gls)
1999–2000	Vila Nova		
2000–2001	Gil Vicente	29	(8)
2001–2002	Vitória Guimarães	16	(0)
2003	Grêmio Inhumense		
2003–2005	Rio Ave	47	(8)
2005–2008	União Leiria	87	(15)
2008–2013	Braga	90	(17)
2012	Braga B	1	(0)
2013	Santa Cruz	2	(0)
2014	Icasa		
2014	Aimoré	5	(1)
2015–2016	Maranhão	5	(0)
Total		282+	(49+)
- * Club domestic league appearances and goals

Paulo César Rocha Rosa (born 5 January 1980), known as Paulo César, is a Brazilian former professional footballer who played as a forward.

He spent most of his career in Portugal, amassing Primeira Liga totals of 269 matches and 48 goals over 13 seasons, mainly with Braga and União de Leiria.

== Career ==
Paulo César was born in São Luís, Maranhão. He started out at Vila Nova Futebol Clube, then moved to Portugal still a youngster to go on to represent Gil Vicente FC, Vitória de Guimarães, Rio Ave F.C. and U.D. Leiria, making his Primeira Liga debut on 20 August 2000 against S.C. Campomaiorense as a member of Gil; in 2003, he had a short return stint in Brazil with Grêmio Esportivo Inhumense.

On 9 March 2008, Paulo César scored once for Leiria (eventually relegated) against S.L. Benfica at the Estádio da Luz, and the 2–2 final score meant the opposition coach José Antonio Camacho's dismissal. In July, after netting five goals in 29 games in his last season, he signed for S.C. Braga.

In his second campaign with the Minho club, Paulo César contributed prominently as it achieved a best-ever runner-up league position. He notably scored in home wins against Benfica (2–0) and Sporting CP (1–0), two of his five during the season.

Paulo César appeared in 40 official matches in 2010–11, including six in Braga's runner-up run in the UEFA Europa League. On 14 April 2011, he was sent off in the 30th minute of the quarter-finals second leg against FC Dynamo Kyiv for a dangerous challenge, but his team managed to progress to the next stage after securing a 0–0 home draw (1–1 on aggregate).

In January 2013, the 33-year-old Paulo César left Braga and returned to his homeland, joining lowly Santa Cruz Futebol Clube.

== Honours ==
Braga

- Taça da Liga: 2012–13
- UEFA Intertoto Cup: 2008
- UEFA Europa League runner-up: 2010–11

Santa Cruz

- Campeonato Pernambucano: 2013
