= Luciano Sorriso =

Brazilian footballer

Personal information
- Full name: Luciano Pazzini Prado
- Date of birth: September 8, 1983 (age 43)
- Place of birth: Guaratinguetá, Brazil
- Height: 1.80 m (5 ft 11 in)
- Position: Midfielder

Team information
- Current team: Santa Cruz
- Number: 8

Senior career*
Years	Team	Apps	(Gls)
2002–2007	Figueirense		
2007	Ipatinga		
2008–2009	Mirassol		
2008	→ Ponte Preta (loan)		
2009	Ipatinga		
2010	Monte Azul		
2010–2011	Bragantino		
2011	Fortaleza		
2011	Red Bull Brasil		
2012	Mirassol		
2012	Bragantino		
2013–2014	Santa Cruz		
2014	Atlético Goianiense		
2015–	Botafogo-SP		
- * Club domestic league appearances and goals

Luciano Pazzini Prado, known as Luciano Sorriso, (born 8 September 1983 in Guaratinguetá) is a Brazilian footballer. He currently plays for Santa Cruz.

== Honours ==
Figueirense

- Campeonato Catarinense: 2003, 2004, 2006

Santa Cruz

- Campeonato Pernambucano: 2013
- Campeonato Brasileiro Série C: 2013

Botafogo-SP

- Campeonato Brasileiro Série D: 2015
