= Everton Sena =

Brazilian footballer (born 1991)

Personal information
- Full name: Antônio Everton Sena Barbosa
- Date of birth: June 14, 1991 (age 35)
- Place of birth: Recife, Brazil
- Height: 1.85 m (6 ft 1 in)
- Position: Centre-back

Team information
- Current team: América-RN
- Number: 14

Youth career
- 2009: Santa Cruz

Senior career*
Years	Team	Apps	(Gls)
2009–2016	Santa Cruz	141	(7)
2015	→ Boa Esporte (loan)	32	(0)
2016	→ Londrina (loan)	20	(1)
2017	Goiás	35	(2)
2018	CRB	42	(2)
2019–2020	Novorizontino	21	(1)
2019	→ Vitória (loan)	29	(3)
2020–2021	Cuiabá	14	(1)
2021	Always Ready	0	(0)
2022	Remo	10	(0)
2023–	América-RN	9	(0)
- * Club domestic league appearances and goals as of 21:25, 17 June 2023 (UTC)

Antônio Everton Sena Barbosa (born June 14, 1991), known as Everton Sena, is a Brazilian footballer, who plays as a centre-back for América-RN. Even being young is idol Santa Cruz and is nationally known as a great marker.

== Honours ==
Santa Cruz

- Campeonato Pernambucano: 2011, 2012, 2013, 2015, 2016
- Campeonato Brasileiro Série C: 2013
- Copa Pernambuco: 2008, 2009, 2010
- Taça Chico Science: 2016
- Copa do Nordeste: 2016
