= Dedé (footballer, born 1987) =

Brazilian footballer

Dedree
Personal information
- Full name: Derivaldo Beserra Cavalcante
- Date of birth: 31 May 1987 (age 39)
- Place of birth: Fortaleza, Brazil
- Height: 1.75 m (5 ft 9 in)
- Position: Midfielder

Team information
- Current team: Treze

Youth career
- 2005–2007: Ferroviário

Senior career*
Years	Team	Apps	(Gls)
2007–2010	Ferroviário		
2008	→ Ceará (loan)		
2009	→ Ituano (loan)		
2009	→ Bahia (loan)	4	(0)
2009	→ Fortaleza (loan)	17	(1)
2010	Santa Cruz	8	(0)
2010	Icasa	0	(0)
2011	Tiradentes	0	(0)
2011	Vila Nova	0	(0)
2011	Bahia de Feira	8	(0)
2012	Tiradentes	0	(0)
2012–2013	Horizonte	7	(1)
2013	→ Campinense (loan)	0	(0)
2013	Santa Cruz	15	(1)
2014	Chapecoense	19	(1)
2015	Ponte Preta	0	(0)
2015	ABC	14	(0)
2016	Santa Cruz	0	(0)
2016	→ Cuiabá (loan)	7	(0)
2017	Treze	0	(0)
2017	Portuguesa	2	(0)
2018	Treze	13	(1)
2019	Sampaio Corrêa	8	(0)
2019	Pacajus EC		
2020–	Treze	0	(0)
- * Club domestic league appearances and goals as of 19:36, 19 January 2020 (UTC)

Derivaldo Beserra Cavalcante, known as Dedé, (born 31 May 1987) is a Brazilian professional footballer who plays as a midfielder for Treze.

== Career ==
Dedé was born in Fortaleza. In his early career with Ferroviário, he was loaned out to a number of clubs, playing in Campeonato Brasileiro Série B with Bahia and Fortaleza. He left Ferroviário to join Santa Cruz in 2010, and then Icasa later that year.

He went on to represent Bahia de Feira and Horizonte in Campeonato Brasileiro Série D in 2011 and 2012 respectively, and was part of the Campinense team which won the 2013 Copa do Nordeste before returning to Santa Cruz for a second spell which saw the club get promotion from 2013 Campeonato Brasileiro Série C

In 2014 he signed for Chapecoense, playing 19 times in 2014 Campeonato Brasileiro Série A. In 2015, despite Chapecoense wanting him to stay, he signed for Ponte Preta on a one-year deal. By May the same year he had moved to ABC for the 2015 Campeonato Brasileiro Série B season.

Dedé returned to Santa Cruz for a third spell at the start of 2016. In July 2016 he was loaned to Cuiabá for the remainder of the season. In 2017 he was contracted by Treze for Campeonato Paraibano, after which he signed for Portuguesa for 2017 Campeonato Brasileiro Série D. He returned to Treze for the 2018 season, playing in the Paraibano, 2018 Copa do Nordeste and most significantly, gaining promotion from 2018 Campeonato Brasileiro Série D. In the promotion-winning game, Dedé scored the winning goal against Caxias, and his celebrations in front of the Caxias fans. In the ensuing brawl, five players were sent off.

Dedé signed for Sampaio Corrêa in 2019, and returned to Treze again in 2020.

== Honours ==
Santa Cruz

- Campeonato Brasileiro Série C: 2013
- Copa do Nordeste: 2016

Campinense

- Copa do Nordeste: 2013
