= Philco (footballer) =

Brazilian football

Personal information
- Full name: Halesson Tiago Barbosa Honorato
- Date of birth: February 4, 1989 (age 37)
- Place of birth: Igarassu, Brazil
- Height: 1.83 m (6 ft 0 in)
- Position: Forward

Team information
- Current team: Żebbuġ Rovers

Youth career
- 2005–2007: Atlético Paranaense

Senior career*
Years	Team	Apps	(Gls)
2007	Atletico Paranaense		
2007–2009	Braga	3	(0)
2008–2009	→ Portimonense (loan)	8	(1)
2009–2010	Figueirense	0	(0)
2011	América (PE)	3	(1)
2011	Pelotas	0	(0)
2012	Belo Jardim	8	(6)
2012	Cabense	1	(0)
2013	Santa Cruz	0	(0)
2013	Central	6	(2)
2014	Confiança	0	(0)
2015	CSE	0	(0)
2015	Araripina		
2016	Guarani de Juazeiro	3	(0)
2017	Joseense	0	(0)
2018	Xewkija Tigers		
2019	Xewkija Tigers		
2019	Żebbuġ Rovers		
2022	HNK Zmaj		
- * Club domestic league appearances and goals

Halesson Tiago Barbosa Honorato (born February 4, 1989), also known as Philco, is a Brazilian footballer who plays as a forward for HNK Zmaj Makarska.

== Career ==
Honorato was born Iguaçu, Brazil. He started at Brazilian club Clube Atlético Paranaense. He played in the Curitiba club's youth academy, where he prospered. He made his professional debut in 2007. Clube Atlético Paranaense president João Augusto Fleury da Rocha has said that Philco had been looked at by several Italian teams. He has also stated that the young Brazilian was widely regarded as the new Zico; even national team coach Dunga has stated similar information to journalists. In June 2007, Philco moved to S.C. Braga, but he only made three substitute appearances in the Portuguese Liga for the club.

On 25 January 2018, Philco joined Xewkija Tigers in Malta. He left the club at the end of the season, where his contract expired. But in January 2019, he joined the club again. He left the club in the summer and joined Żebbuġ Rovers on 5 September 2019.
