= Assisinho =

Brazilian footballer

Personal information
- Full name: Francisco de Assis Mota Sobrinho
- Date of birth: 28 July 1987 (age 39)
- Place of birth: Juazeiro do Norte, Brazil
- Height: 1.70 m (5 ft 7 in)
- Positions: Attacking midfielder; forward

Senior career*
Years	Team	Apps	(Gls)
2007	Icasa		
2007	América-CE		
2008	Icasa		
2009	Crato		
2009	Crateús		
2010–2012	Icasa	34	(9)
2011	→ Botafogo-SP (loan)	17	(4)
2011	→ Guarani (loan)	14	(0)
2011	→ Oeste (loan)	13	(0)
2012–2013	Fortaleza	59	(25)
2014–2016	Ceará	76	(13)
2016	→ CRB (loan)	13	(1)
2017	Ferroviário	11	(0)
2017–2018	Guarani de Juazeiro	11	(3)
2018	Crato		
2019	Manaus		
2019	Barbalha		
2019	Crato		
2019	Novas Russas		
2020	Barbalha		
2020	Guarani de Juazeiro		
2020–2021	Icasa		
2022	Guarani de Juazeiro		
- * Club domestic league appearances and goals

Francisco de Assis Mota Sobrinho (born 28 July 1987), better known as Assisinho, is a Brazilian former professional footballer who played as an attacking midfielder and forward.

== Career ==
Assisinho started his career at Icasa, the team with which he was champion of the second division of Ceará in 2010. He played for some other clubs in the state, and in São Paulo, until in 2013 he arrived at Fortaleza, a team where he scored 25 goals and was top scorer in the Série C that year. In 2014 he switched to rivals Ceará, and won the 2014 Campeonato Cearense there. He also had spells at CRB and Manaus, and other smaller clubs in Ceará, until ending his career at Guarani de Juazeiro in 2022.

== Honours ==
Icasa

- Campeonato Cearense Série B: 2010
- Copa Fares Lopes: 2021

Ceará

- Campeonato Cearense: 2014

Guarani de Juazeiro

- Campeonato Cearense Série B: 2022

Individual

- 2013 Campeonato Brasileiro Série C top scorer: 12 goals
