= Marcus Vinícius (footballer, born 1983) =

Brazilian footballer

Marquinhos
Personal information
- Full name: Marcus Vinicius da Cruz Alves da Nóbrega
- Date of birth: March 22, 1983 (age 43)
- Place of birth: Rio de Janeiro, Brazil
- Height: 1.83 m (6 ft 0 in)
- Position: Right back

Youth career
- 2002–2003: Ponte Preta

Senior career*
Years	Team	Apps	(Gls)
2003	Ponte Preta	30	(1)
2004	Portuguesa-SP		
2005	Criciúma		
2006	Madureira		
2006–2007	Boavista	8	(0)
2008	Vasco	5	(0)
2010	Duque de Caxias	41	(1)
2010–	Fluminense	3	(0)
2011	→ Paraná (loan)	14	(0)
2012	→ Náutico (loan)		
2013	Santa Cruz		
- * Club domestic league appearances and goals

Marcus Vinícius da Cruz Alves Nóbrega or simply Marcus Vinícius (born March 22, 1983, in Rio de Janeiro), is a Brazilian right back. He currently plays for Clube Náutico Capibaribe on loan from Fluminense Football Club.

He also played under the name Marquinho in Portugal.

Marcus Vinícius was without a club after released by Boavista F.C. in summer 2007 & Vasco signed him on December 20, 2007.

== Honours ==
- Santa Catarina State League: 2005
- Rio de Janeiro's Cup: 2006

== Contract ==
- 2 January 2008 to 31 December 2010
