= Fabián Coronel =

Argentine footballer

Personal information
- Full name: Fabián Horacio Coronel
- Date of birth: 29 June 1987 (age 39)
- Place of birth: González Catán, Argentina
- Height: 1.78 m (5 ft 10 in)
- Positions: Right back; defensive midfielder

Youth career
- 2004–2005: Vélez Sarsfield

Senior career*
Years	Team	Apps	(Gls)
2005–2008	Vélez Sarsfield		
2008–2010	Tiro Federal		
2009	→ Sportivo Luqueño (loan)		
2010	→ Čapljina (loan)		
2011	Leotar	5	(0)
2011–2012	Huracán Tres Arroyos		
2012–2013	Instituto	11	(0)
2013–2014	Santa Cruz		
2014	Paraná		
2014	Santamarina		

International career
- Argentina U20
- * Club domestic league appearances and goals

Fabián Horacio Coronel (born 29 June 1987) is an Argentine footballer who plays as a right defender or defensive midfielder.

== Career ==
A youth product of Club Atlético Vélez Sarsfield, Coronel left the club in 2008 to join Primera B Nacional club Tiro Federal. However, after appearing sparingly with the latter, he was loaned to Sportivo Luqueño and Čapljina. In January 2011, Coronel moved abroad for the first time, joining Bosnian Premier League club Leotar Trebinje. He again featured in only five matches, and eventually returned to his home country, signing with Huracán de Tres Arroyos.

On 11 July 2012, Coronel moved to Instituto. He only featured in 11 matches in his only season, and subsequently was released. In July 2013, Coronel went on trial at Sport Recife. However, nothing came of it, and he signed with city rivals Santa Cruz. On 8 January 2014, Coronel joined Paraná.
