= Everton Heleno =

Brazilian footballer (born 1990)

Personal information
- Full name: Everton Heleno dos Santos
- Date of birth: 25 November 1990 (age 35)
- Place of birth: Recife, Brazil
- Height: 1.87 m (6 ft 2 in)
- Position: Midfielder

Team information
- Current team: Luverdense

Youth career
- 2007–2008: Jacareí
- 2008–2010: Sport Recife

Senior career*
Years	Team	Apps	(Gls)
2010–2011	Sport Recife	1	(0)
2011	Petrolina	1	(0)
2012	Cotia FC		
2013	Santa Cruz	8	(1)
2013	→ Ypiranga (loan)	0	(0)
2014–2016	Mogi Mirim	25	(4)
2016–2017	ASA	0	(0)
2017	CSA	13	(14)
2017	Atlético Goianiense	3	(0)
2018	Botafogo SP	6	(1)
2019–2022	Botafogo PB	28	(2)
2021	→ Portuguesa RJ (loan)	9	(1)
2021	→ América RN (loan)	7	(1)
2021	→ Mirassol (loan)	9	(2)
2022	→ Pacajus (loan)	4	(0)
2023	ASA	25	(2)
2023	Atlético Torres		
2023–	Luverdense		
- * Club domestic league appearances and goals as of 6 August 2023

Everton Heleno dos Santos (born 25 November 1990), known as just Everton Heleno, is a Brazilian footballer who plays as a midfielder for Luverdense.
