= Júnior Xuxa =

Brazilian footballer

Personal information
- Full name: Diogenes Alves de Miranda Junior
- Date of birth: March 12, 1984 (age 42)
- Place of birth: Garanhuns, Brazil
- Height: 1.78 m (5 ft 10 in)
- Position: Attacking midfielder

Youth career
- 2001–2004: Vitória

Senior career*
Years	Team	Apps	(Gls)
2007–2008	Nacional (PB)		
2008	Serrano		
2008	Ceará		
2009	Ypiranga		
2009–2010	Icasa	42	(15)
2010–2013	São Bernardo	18	(2)
2011	→São Caetano (loan)	4	(0)
2011	→Icasa (loan)	15	(6)
2011–2012	→América de Natal (loan)	8	(2)
2012–2013	→Al-Ittifaq (loan)	21	(7)
2013–2014	ABC	5	(0)
2013	→Santa Cruz (loan)	11	(1)
2014	Icasa	1	(0)
2014	Vila Nova	13	(1)
2014–2016	Ríver	9	(0)
2016	Treze	1	(1)
2016–2017	Ríver	14	(0)
2017	Murici	3	(1)
- * Club domestic league appearances and goals as of 14:36, 11 April 2018 (UTC)

Diogenes Alves de Miranda Junior, better known as Júnior Xuxa (born March 12, 1984), is a Brazilian football midfielder who last played for Murici.
