= Pé de Serra =

Municipality of Bahia, Brazil

- City
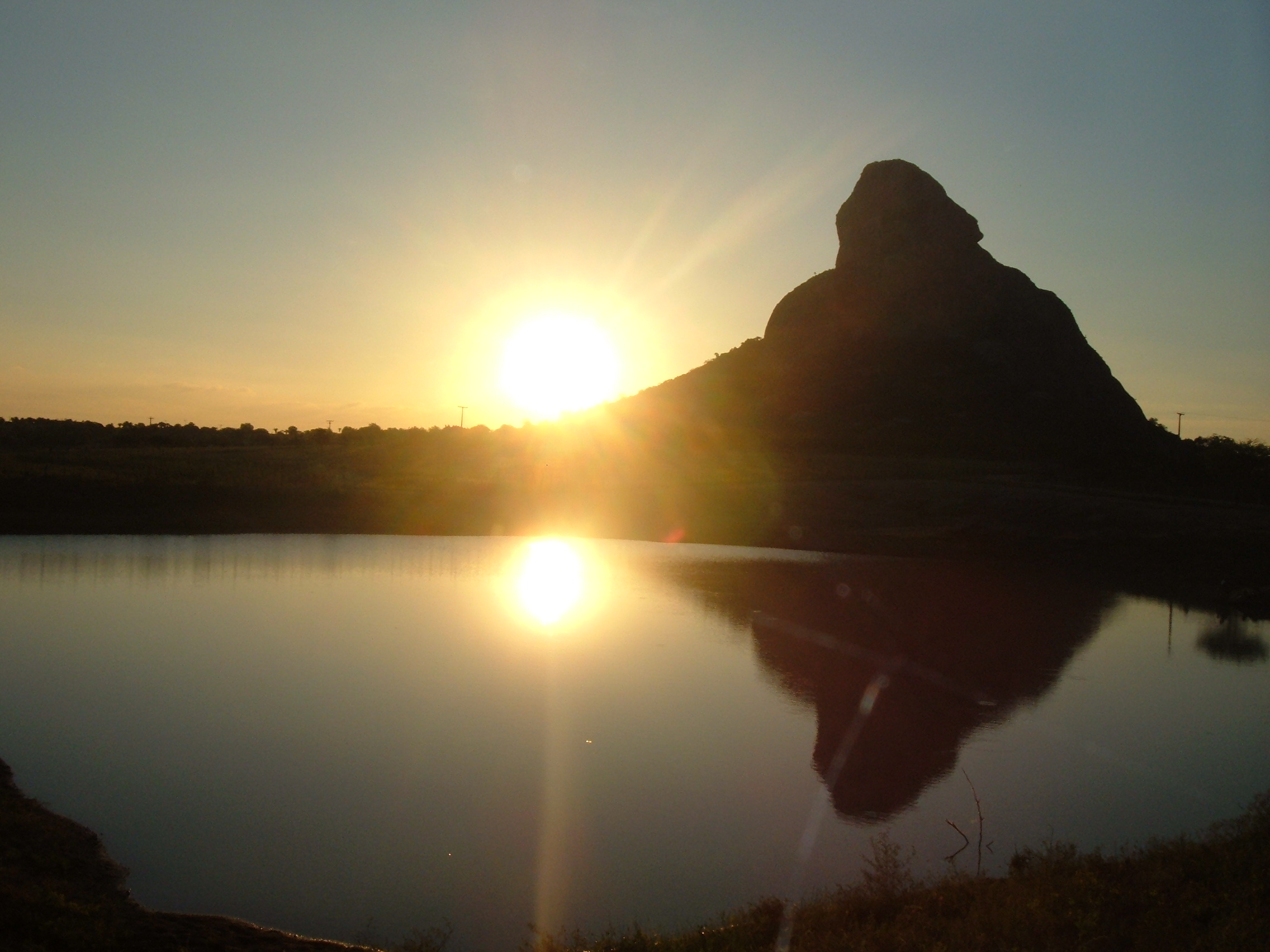
- Pé de Serra skyline

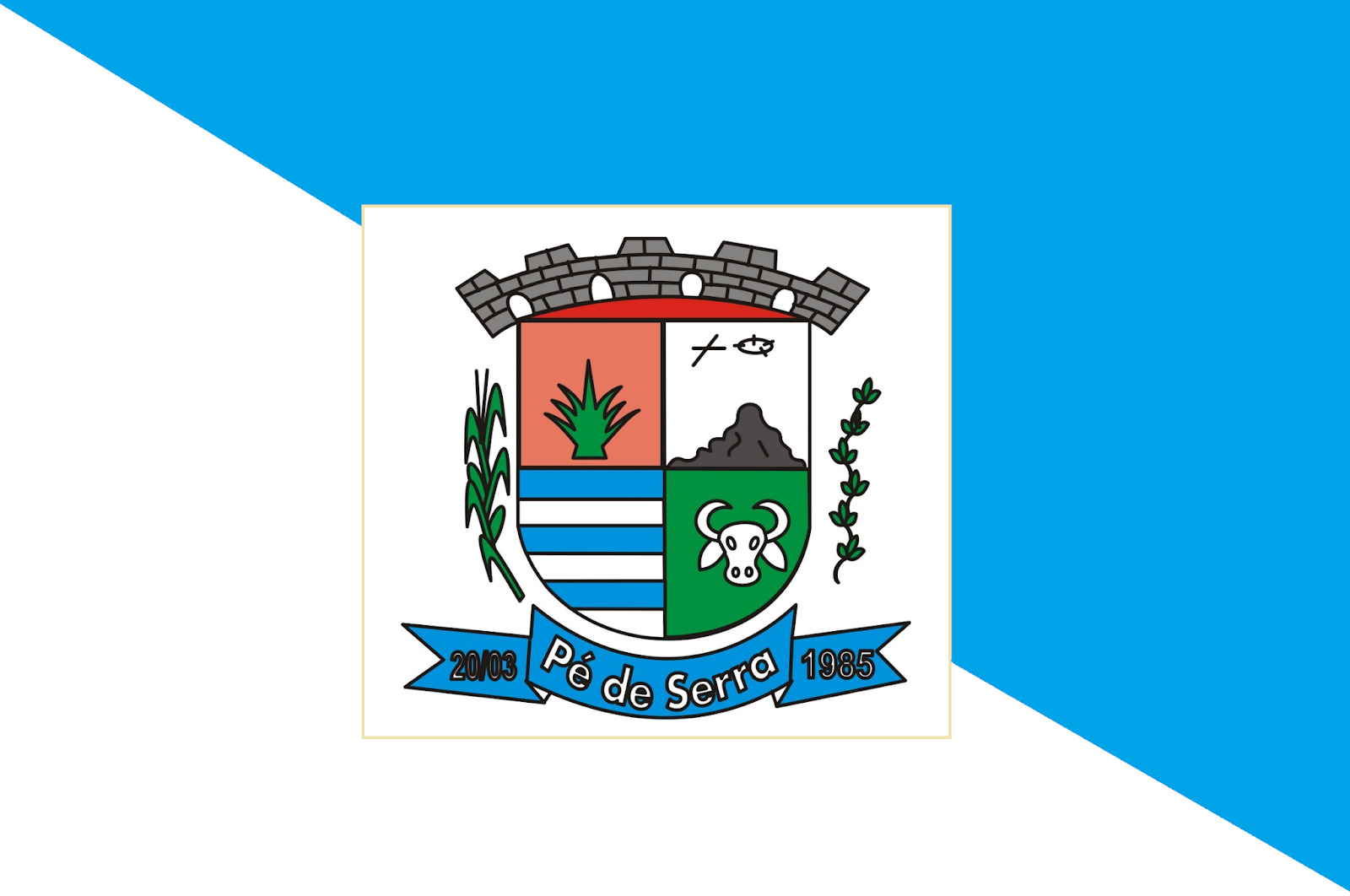
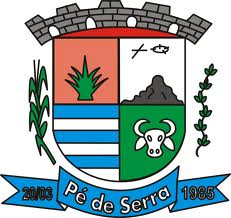
- Flag Coat of arms

- Lozalization of the city
- Coordinates: 11°50′2″S 39°36′46″W
- Country: Brazil
- Region: Northeast
- State: Bahia

Government
  - Mayor: Hildefonso Vitório dos Santos (PMDB)

Area
  - Total: 596.771 km^{2} (230.415 sq mi)
- Elevation: 286 m (938 ft)

Population (2020)
  - Total: 13,556
  - Density: 22.3/km^{2} (58/sq mi)
- Time zone: UTC−3 (BRT)
- Website: www.pedeserranet.com

Pé de Serra (Mountain Foot in English) is a Brazilian municipality in the state of Bahia. It is located in Sisaleira region, Microregion of Serrinha (Microrregião de Serrinha, in Portuguese). It was emancipated on March 20, 1985, and the population according to IBGE (Instituto Brasileiro de Geografia e Estatísticas - Brazilian Institute of Geography and Statisticians) was 13,556 in 2020. The territorial area is 597 km^{2}.

The city of Pé de Serra is situated on the slopes of the mountain Lion. The city lies between the two main mountains, Lion and Bugi. The city has several towns which serve as urban centres in addition to the city centre itself.

== History ==
Tradition has it that three Portuguese brothers, exploring a vast region in search of fertile land in 1745, camped near Riachão do Jacuípe, which at the time was a cattle farm.

After some time of exploration, one of their dogs went missing and reappeared days later at the camp. It was given water and food. To everybody's surprise, the dog ate the food it was offered but didn't drink any of the water even though there was a drought at the time.

Suspicious of the dog's strange behaviour, the brothers began to observe it more closely. They noticed that the dog went into the underbrush of gravatá and was wet all over when it emerged again. A minadouro well was discovered at this location, and it was named as 'the heath at the foot of the mountain', from which the name “Pé de Serra" originates.

The city was emancipated on March 20, 1985, as a separate entity from Riachão do Jacuípe.

== Demography ==
The demographic trend of the municipality points downward. The population suffered a huge decrease, from 17,048 in 1991 to 11,727 in 2004. The most likely cause for this is internal migration to other more developed regions in Bahia, especially the metropolitan region of Salvador and Feira de Santana, and migration to other states, particularly São Paulo.

The population of the Pé de Serra consists of people of white, brown and black skin colour. The white population is composed mostly of descendants of Portuguese, and also a few Spanish and Dutch, settlers. The blacks are tend to be descendants of slaves.

The predominant religion in Pé de Serra is Roman Catholic, but other denominations are becoming more noticeable, especially evangelical Christians.

== Culture ==
The next cultural foot-de-serrense includes the orchestra filarmônica Community Association and Musical Lira August 6, in addition to the celebrations that happen in the council, as vaquejada, Corpus Christi, St. John and September 7.

Some traditions are held in the city, such as the manufacture of carpets in the streets of the city centre on the day of Corpus Christi, burning of Judas on Saturday, Hallelujah and climb hills on Friday of the passion.

In the city there is still no cultural centers, such as theatres, cinemas, galleries, arts, museums, but it has some bars and educational institutions, besides the Acups (Cultural Association of foot-Sierra).

The Mother Church, the Brejo the foot of the Sierra and a small chapel located in the Monte Belo can be considered monuments of the city.

== Economy ==
The Prefecture and the National Institute for Social Security (Instituto Nacional do Seguro Social, INSS) are mainly responsible for the injection of resources into the economy of the municipality. Public bodies and INSS pensions are important sources of income for the economy of the municipality.

The economic activity of the municipality is based mainly on agriculture and livestock. Amongst the livestock industry, rearing of cattle, sheep, pigs and goats is prominent, but herds of horses, and donkey mules are also found. There are some farms where chickens are bred for trade with other municipalities.

The dairy council also contributes to the development of dairies whose products range from the traditional cottage cheese (skuta) to yogurt, in addition to increasing specialization in the production of cheese. This production, is chiefly marketed in the cities of Salvador, Feira de Santana, Camaçari and Juazeiro, all located in Bahia.

In agriculture, the main crops are sisal (also known as agave), beans, maize, cassava, vegetables and greens. However, the plantations are increasingly scarce in the rural area of the municipality because the booming livestock industry encroaches on the space available.

Other industries include an extraction plant, plantations for the growth of umbu fruit and forestry for firewood production.

== Tourism ==
There is little tourism activity in Pé de Serra. However, some cultural activities attract visitors from other regions of the country, particularly relatives of the local population living elsewhere.

On January 6, the feast of herdsmen (vaqueiros) and farmers takes place with massive participation of the local population and tourists, many attracted by the music shows, the Aboio tradition of drovers' songs, the races and the marching bands.

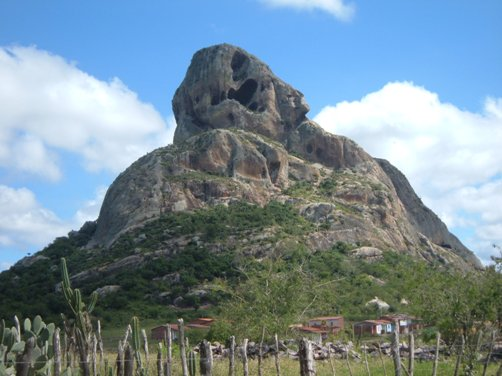
Serra do Leão, view of where is the cruise.

In March, visitors come to Pé de Serra for the now traditional marathon and civic pride parade, held to commemorate the anniversary of the council.

During Easter, the city hosts several traditional activities. Good Friday Passion plays are performed on Sierra Leon and other nearby mountains, reflecting long‑standing local customs. The ascent of Sierra Leon and Monte Belo attracts participants seeking outdoor recreation and contact with nature, and hundreds of people make this annual pilgrimage. The period also coincides with Micareta held at the base of the Sierra, locally referred to as “Pascareta.”

In the afternoon of the Saturday of Holy Week, Charanga, the famous festival takes place, dragging a euphoric crowd through the streets of the town, dancing to the sound of sambas-de-washing, marchinhas of carnival and other melodies. At night, the festival finishes with the burning of "Judas" in a public square. This show is a particular attraction for tourists because it is not just a firework display but an explosion of joy stimulated by the excitement of the pyrotechnic display. Before the burning of Judas, his 'will' is read out, which is a review of events and the main characters that marked the previous year.

== See also ==
- List of municipalities in Bahia
