= Vica =

Brazilian footballer and manager

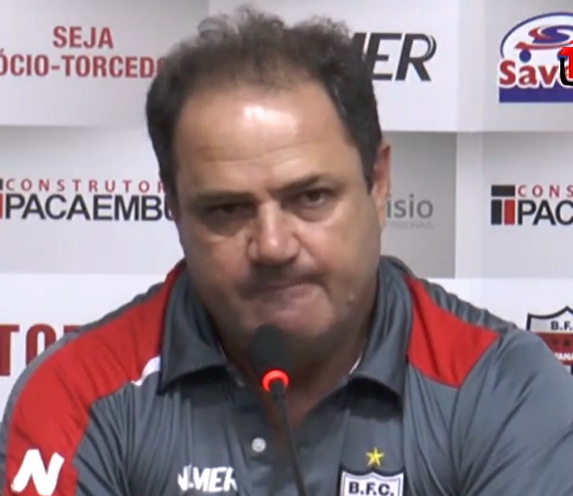
- Vica in 2017

Personal information
- Full name: José Luis Mauro
- Date of birth: 10 March 1961 (age 65)
- Place of birth: Araraquara, Brazil
- Position: Centre-back

Youth career
- Ferroviária

Senior career*
Years	Team	Apps	(Gls)
1979–1983	Ferroviária		
1983	Joinville		
1984–1988	Fluminense		
1988–1990	Coritiba		
1988–1990	Coritiba		
1991	Comercial		
1991	Atlético Paranaense		
1992	Paraná		
1992	Fluminense		
1993	São José		
1994	Atlético Paranaense		
1994	Itumbiara		
1995	Rio Branco-PR		

Managerial career
- 1995: Rio Branco-PR
- 1996: Itumbiara
- 1998: Anapolina
- 1999: São Caetano
- 1999: Itumbiara
- 1999: Anapolina
- 2000: Nacional de Manaus
- 2000: Anapolina
- 2000: Atlético Goianiense
- 2001: América-SP
- 2001: Goiás
- 2001–2002: Anapolina
- 2002: Inter de Limeira
- 2002: Santo André
- 2003: Anapolina
- 2003: Inter de Limeira
- 2004: Nacional de Manaus
- 2005: CRAC
- 2005: Anápolis
- 2005: Rio Preto
- 2005–2006: Londrina
- 2007: Catanduvense
- 2007: Caldense
- 2007: Grêmio Jaciara
- 2008: Fast Clube
- 2008–2011: ASA
- 2012: Anapolina
- 2012–2013: Fortaleza
- 2013: Treze
- 2013–2014: Santa Cruz
- 2014: Paysandu
- 2015–2016: ASA
- 2016: Ríver
- 2017: XV de Piracicaba
- 2017: Botafogo-SP
- 2019: Portuguesa
- * Club domestic league appearances and goals

José Luis Mauro (born 10 March 1961), commonly known as Vica, is a Brazilian football manager and former player who played as a central defender.

== Career statistics ==
Appearances and goals by club, season and competition
Club	Season	League			Cup (Note: Includes Copa do Brasil.)		Continental		Total	
Club	Season	Division	Apps	Goals	Apps	Goals	Apps	Goals	Apps	Goals
Fluminense	1985				–		6 (Note: Appearances in Copa Libertadores)	0	6	0
Fluminense	1992				2	0	–		2	0
Fluminense	Total				2	0	8	0		

== Honours ==
=== Player ===
Fluminense

- Campeonato Carioca: 1984, 1985
- Campeonato Brasileiro Série A: 1984

Coritiba

- Campeonato Paranaense: 1989

=== Manager ===
Rio Branco-PR

- Campeonato Paranaense Série Prata: 1995

Goiás

- Copa Centro-Oeste: 2000

ASA

- Campeonato Alagoano: 2009, 2011
- Copa Alagoas: 2015

Santa Cruz

- Campeonato Brasileiro Série C: 2013
