= Pingo (footballer, born 1991) =

Brazilian footballer

Personal information
- Full name: Tarcísio Lopes da Silva
- Date of birth: January 10, 1991 (age 35)
- Place of birth: Paulista, Brazil
- Height: 1.76 m (5 ft 9 in)
- Position: Winger

Senior career*
Years	Team	Apps	(Gls)
2010	Campinense	6	(0)
2011–2012	América (RN)	39	(9)
2013	Ceará	28	(5)
2013	→ ABC (loan)	22	(2)
2014–2015	Santa Cruz	40	(4)
2015	Red Bull Brasil	2	(1)
2015	CRB	5	(0)
2015	ABC	5	(1)
2015–2018	Botafogo (PB)	6	(1)
2016	→ Confiança (loan)	7	(1)
2016	→ Resende (loan)	8	(1)
2017	→ Ituano (loan)	6	(0)
2018	Resende	7	(3)
2018	CSA	4	(0)
2018	Bangu	5	(1)
2019	Confiança	3	(0)
2019–2020	Hetten		
2020	Goytacaz		
2020–2021	Muscat		
2021–2022	Al-Sadd		
- * Club domestic league appearances and goals as of November 8, 2013

Tarcísio Lopes da Silva (born January 10, 1991, in Paulista), better known as Pingo, is a Brazilian professional footballer who plays as a winger.
