= 2013 Campeonato Pernambucano =

Campeonato Pernambucano - 1ª Divisão
- Season: 2013
- Champions: Santa Cruz
- Relegated: Petrolina; Belo Jardim
- Copa do Brasil: Santa Cruz; Sport; Náutico
- Série D: Ypiranga; Central
- Matches played: 78
- Goals scored: 201 (2.58 per match)
- Top goalscorer: Élton (Náutico - 17 goals

The 2013 Campeonato Pernambucano, named Pernambucano Coca-Cola 2013 - Série A1 for sponsorship reasons, was the 99th edition of the state championship of Pernambuco. With the return of Copa do Nordeste in 2013 and the participation of three teams from the state (Santa Cruz, Sport and Salgueiro), the formula of this edition was not the same as the previous championship. The competition is started on January 20 and concluded on May 19. Santa Cruz won their 27th championship, with Sport as runner-up. Petrolina and Belo Jardim were relegated to the second division of Campeonato Pernambucano.

== Format ==
In the first stage, the championship will be played in two rounds. In the first round nine clubs (excluding the teams participating in the 2013 Copa do Nordeste) play each other once. The team that finishes first gains a place in the 2014 Copa do Brasil.

The second round will feature twelve clubs, with the inclusion of Santa Cruz Futebol Clube, Sport Club do Recife and Salgueiro Atlético Clube, who play each once. The top four teams qualify for the semifinals. The eight remaining teams will play each other in a play out, where the last two are demoted to Série A2 in 2014. In the semifinals the top four teams compete against each other in a two-game format (number one plays number four, number two plays number three). The winners of the semifinals qualify for the final which will be played over two games to decide the winner.

== Participants ==
Team	City	In 2012	Stadium	Capacity	Titles (latest)
Belo Jardim Futebol Clube	Belo Jardim	8th (Série A1)	Mendonção/SESC	5,259	0 (none)
Central Sport Club	Caruaru	10th (Série A1)	Lacerdão	19,548	0 (none)
Chã Grande Futebol Clube	Chã Grande	1st (Série A2)	Barbosão	4,000	0 (none)
Clube Náutico Capibaribe	Recife	4th (Série A1)	Aflitos	22,856	21 (last in 2004)
Pesqueira Futebol Clube	Pesqueira	2nd (Série A2)	Joaquim José de Brito	3,500	0 (none)
Petrolina Social Futebol Clube	Petrolina	5th (Série A1)	Paulo de Souza Coelho	5,000	0 (none)
Clube Atlético do Porto	Caruaru	7th (Série A1)	Lacerdão	19,548	0 (none)
Salgueiro Atlético Clube	Salgueiro	3rd (Série A1)	Cornélio de Barros	10,240	0 (none)
Santa Cruz Futebol Clube	Recife	1st (Série A1)	Arruda	60,040	26 (last in 2012)
Serra Talhada Futebol Clube	Serra Talhada	9th (Série A1)	Nildo Pereira	5,000	0 (none)
Sport Club do Recife	Recife	2nd (Série A1)	Ilha do Retiro	32,983	39 (last in 2010)
Sociedade Esportiva Ypiranga Futebol Clube	Santa Cruz	6th (Série A1)	Limeirão	5,000	0 (none)

== First round ==
Pos	Team	Pld	W	D	L	GF	GA	GD	Pts	Qualification
1	Náutico (A)	8	6	1	1	17	8	+9	19	Qualified to 2014 Copa do Brasil and First Round Champion
2	Central	8	6	1	1	14	6	+8	19	
3	Belo Jardim	8	4	2	2	8	6	+2	14	
4	Serra Talhada	8	4	1	3	10	11	−1	13	
5	Pesqueira	8	3	3	2	9	7	+2	12	
6	Chã Grande	8	2	2	4	6	8	−2	8	
7	Ypiranga	8	2	2	4	5	8	−3	8	
8	Porto	8	1	3	4	1	9	−8	6	
9	Petrolina	8	0	1	7	3	10	−7	1	

Updated to match(es) played on 03 August 2013. Source: UOL Esporte
Rules for classification: 1) points; 2) goal difference; 3) number of goals scored.
(A) Advance to a further round

=== Results ===
Home \ Away	BEL	CEN	CHÃ	NAU	PES	PET	POR	SET	YPI
Belo Jardim		1–1		2–3				2–1	1–0
Central			2–1		1–0	1–0			2–1
Chã Grande	0–1			2–2			1–0	0–1	
Náutico		0–1			3–1			2–1	3–1
Pesqueira	1–0		2–1			1–1	0–0		
Petrolina	0–1		0–1	0–1			0–1		
Porto	0–0	0–4		0–3				0–0	
Serra Talhada		3–2			1–4	2–1			1–0
Ypiranga			0–0		0–0	2–1	1–0		

Legend: Blue = home team win; Yellow = draw; Red = away team win.

== Second round ==
Pos	Team	Pld	W	D	L	GF	GA	GD	Pts	Qualification
1	Sport (A)	11	6	4	1	24	11	+13	22	Qualified to Final stage
2	Náutico (A)	11	7	0	4	32	12	+20	21	Qualified to Final stage
3	Santa Cruz (A)	11	6	3	2	15	8	+7	21	Qualified to Final stage
4	Ypiranga (A)	11	5	4	2	20	16	+4	19	Qualified to Final stage
5	Pesqueira	11	4	3	4	19	18	+1	15	Advances to Relegation tournament
6	Porto	11	3	4	4	17	20	−3	13	Advances to Relegation tournament
7	Belo Jardim	11	3	4	4	15	20	−5	13	Advances to Relegation tournament
8	Petrolina	11	3	3	5	11	19	−8	12	Advances to Relegation tournament
9	Chã Grande	11	3	3	5	12	23	−11	12	Advances to Relegation tournament
10	Central	11	3	2	6	11	16	−5	11	Advances to Relegation tournament
11	Salgueiro	11	3	2	6	8	17	−9	11	Advances to Relegation tournament
12	Serra Talhada	11	3	2	6	15	19	−4	11	Advances to Relegation tournament

Updated to match(es) played on 03 August 2013. Source: UOL Esporte
Rules for classification: 1) points; 2) goal difference; 3) number of goals scored.
(A) Advance to a further round

=== Results ===
Home \ Away	BEL	CEN	CHÃ	NAU	PES	PET	POR	SAL	SAN	SET	SPO	YPI
Belo Jardim					2–2		1–1	3–1	1–2			2–1
Central	1–0			0–4			3–0			2–1	0–1	
Chã Grande	1–2	1–1				2–1	1–1					1–1
Náutico	3–0		5–3			8–0	3–0		0–2			0–2
Pesqueira		3–2	2–0	3–2				0–1				2–3
Petrolina	1–1	2–1			1–0					2–0	0–0	2–3
Porto					3–4	2–1		2–1	1–1	4–0		
Salgueiro		0–0	1–2	0–4		1–1					2–1	0–2
Santa Cruz		2–0	0–1		2–1	1–0		0–1			2–2	
Serra Talhada	2–2		4–0	0–2				2–0	1–1			
Sport	5–1		5–0	2–1	1–1		2–0			3–2		
Ypiranga		2–1			2–2		3–3		0–2	2–1	2–2	

Legend: Blue = home team win; Yellow = draw; Red = away team win.

== Relegation tournament ==
Pos	Team	Pld	W	D	L	GF	GA	GD	Pts	Qualification or relegation
1	Central (A)	7	5	0	2	14	12	+2	15	Qualified to 2013 Campeonato Brasileiro Série D
2	Salgueiro	7	4	2	1	10	5	+5	14	
3	Pesqueira	7	4	1	2	20	7	+13	13	
4	Serra Talhada	7	3	1	3	9	8	+1	10	
5	Porto	7	3	1	3	8	11	−3	10	
6	Chã Grande	7	3	0	4	10	10	0	9	
7	Petrolina (R)	7	2	2	3	7	14	−7	8	Relegated
8	Belo Jardim (R)	7	0	1	6	6	17	−11	1	Relegated

Updated to match(es) played on 03 August 2013. Source: UOL Esporte
Rules for classification: 1) points; 2) goal difference; 3) number of goals scored.
(A) Advance to a further round; (R) Relegated

=== Results ===
Home \ Away	BEL	CEN	CHÃ	PES	PET	POR	SAL	SET
Belo Jardim			1–2		0–1	2–3		1–1
Central	3–1		1–0					3–1
Chã Grande					4–1	1–2	0–2	
Pesqueira	5–1	6–1	1–2					1–0
Petrolina		1–2		1–6			1–1	2–1
Porto		0–3		2–1	0–0		1–2	
Salgueiro	2–0	3–1		0–0				
Serra Talhada			2–1			2–0	2–0	

Legend: Blue = home team win; Yellow = draw; Red = away team win.

== Final stage ==
Semifinals
1	Sport	5	4	9
4	Ypiranga	1	2	3
2	Náutico	0	2	2
3	Santa Cruz	1	1	2

Finals
1	Sport	0	0	0
3	Santa Cruz	1	2	3

=== Semifinals ===
==== First leg ====
April 21, 2013
16:00 UTC−03:00

Ypiranga	1–5	Sport
Diogo Silva 12'		Mateus Lima 32'; Tobi 54'; Lucas Lima 58'; Felipe Azevedo 68'; Reinaldo 84'

Lacerdão, Caruaru
Attendance: 11,134
Referee: Nielson Nogueira Dias

April 21, 2013
16:00 UTC−03:00

Santa Cruz	1–0	Náutico
Renatinho 51'

Estádio do Arruda, Recife
Attendance: 28,275
Referee: Gleydson Leite

==== Second leg ====
April 27, 2013
16:00 UTC−03:00

Sport	4–2	Ypiranga
Marcos Aurélio 1', 54'; Felipe Menezes 5'; Reinaldo 86'		Danubio Beserra 29'; Danilo Siqueira 35'

Estádio Ilha do Retiro, Recife
Attendance: 12,488
Referee: Tiago Nascimento

April 28, 2013
16:00 UTC−03:00

Náutico	2–1	Santa Cruz
Elton 15', 84' (pen.)		Dênis Marques 78' (pen.)

Estádio dos Aflitos, Recife
Attendance: 15,013
Referee: Gilberto Castro Júnior

=== Third place match ===
May 4, 2013
16:00 UTC−03:00

Ypiranga	1–1	Náutico
Vagner Paulo 5'		Élton 39'

Lacerdão, Caruaru
Attendance: 2,182
Referee: Sandro Meira Ricci

May 8, 2013
16:00 UTC−03:00

Náutico	3–0	Ypiranga
Giovanni Augusto 5'; Rogério 40', 72'

Estádio dos Aflitos, Recife
Attendance: 2,173
Referee: Giorgio Wilton

=== Finals ===
May 5, 2013
16:00 UTC−03:00

Santa Cruz	1–0	Sport
Dênis Marques 39'	Report

Estádio do Arruda, Recife
Attendance: 38,201
Referee: Nielson Nogueira Dias

May 12, 2013
16:00 UTC−03:00

Sport	0–2	Santa Cruz
	Report	Flávio Caça-Rato 25'; Sandro Manoel 86'

Estádio Ilha do Retiro, Recife
Attendance: 26,806
Referee: Gilberto Castro Júnior
