= Danilo Pires =

Brazilian footballer (born 1992)

Personal information
- Full name: Danilo Pires Costa
- Date of birth: 21 March 1992 (age 34)
- Place of birth: São Luís, Brazil
- Height: 1.80 m (5 ft 11 in)
- Position: Midfielder

Team information
- Current team: Central

Youth career
- 2009–2011: Corinthians-AL

Senior career*
Years	Team	Apps	(Gls)
2011–2012	River Plate Montevideo	14	(2)
2012–2013	Corinthians-AL	0	(0)
2012	→ Olinda (loan)	2	(0)
2013	→ CSE (loan)	0	(0)
2013	→ Chã Grande (loan)	15	(7)
2013	Santa Rita	0	(0)
2014	→ Central (loan)	24	(6)
2014	Santa Cruz	33	(7)
2015–2016	→ Atlético Mineiro (loan)	10	(0)
2016	→ Bahia (loan)	28	(2)
2016	Santa Cruz	12	(0)
2017	CRB	43	(4)
2018	Santa Rita	0	(0)
2018	→ Paysandu (loan)	17	(0)
2018	→ Sampaio Corrêa (loan)	5	(0)
2019	Náutico	19	(0)
2020–2022	Confiança	35	(2)
2023–	Central	7	(0)
- * Club domestic league appearances and goals as of 5 February 2023

Danilo Pires Costa (born 21 March 1992), known as Danilo Pires, is a Brazilian professional footballer who plays as a midfielder for Central.

== Honours ==
Atlético Mineiro

- Campeonato Mineiro: 2015

CRB

- Campeonato Alagoano: 2017
