= Wescley (footballer, born 1991) =

Brazilian footballer

Personal information
- Full name: Wescley Gomes dos Santos
- Date of birth: 11 October 1991 (age 35)
- Place of birth: Rio de Janeiro, Brazil
- Height: 1.78 m (5 ft 10 in)
- Position: Attacking midfielder

Team information
- Current team: São José

Youth career
- 2008–2010: Atlético Mineiro

Senior career*
Years	Team	Apps	(Gls)
2010–2016	Atlético Mineiro	1	(0)
2011	→ Democrata-SL (loan)	12	(1)
2012	→ Vila Nova (loan)	13	(2)
2013	→ Red Bull Brasil (loan)	19	(1)
2013	→ Ipatinga (loan)	16	(4)
2014	→ Chapecoense (loan)	16	(0)
2014	→ Santa Cruz (loan)	27	(7)
2015	→ Ceará (loan)	37	(2)
2016	→ Ferroviária (loan)	14	(0)
2016	→ Ceará (loan)	28	(7)
2017–2019	Vissel Kobe	13	(0)
2018	→ Ceará (loan)	22	(3)
2019–2022	Ceará	42	(1)
2021	→ Juventude (loan)	33	(2)
2022–2023	Gol Gohar	15	(0)
2024	Floresta	10	(0)
2025–	São José	5	(0)
- * Club domestic league appearances and goals as of 19 March 2025

Wescley Gomes dos Santos (born 11 October 1991), simply known as Wescley, is a Brazilian footballer who plays as an attacking midfielder for São José.

== Career ==
In February 2019, Wescley signed a three-year contract with Ceará.

== Career statistics ==
As of 7 February 2022

Club	Season	League			State League		Cup		Continental		Other		Total	
Club	Season	Division	Apps	Goals	Apps	Goals	Apps	Goals	Apps	Goals	Apps	Goals	Apps	Goals
Atlético Mineiro	2010	Série A	1	0	—		—		—		—		1	0
Democrata-SL (loan)	2011	Mineiro 2ª Divisão	—		12	1	—		—		—		12	1
Vila Nova (loan)	2012	Série C	11	2	2	0	—		—		—		13	2
Red Bull Brasil (loan)	2013	Paulista A2	—		19	1	—		—		—		19	1
Ipatinga (loan)	2013	Série C	16	4	—		—		—		—		16	4
Chapecoense (loan)	2014	Série A	1	0	15	0	2	0	—		—		18	0
Santa Cruz (loan)	2014	Série B	27	7	—		—		—		—		27	7
Ceará (loan)	2015	Série B	28	1	9	1	5	0	—		10 (Note: Appearance(s) in Copa do Nordeste)	1	52	3
Ferroviária (loan)	2016	Série B	—		14	0	4	0	—		—		18	0
Ceará (loan)	2016	Série B	28	7	—		—		—		—		28	7
Vissel Kobe	2017	J1 League	13	0	—		1	0	—		4 (Note: Appearance(s) in J. League Cup)	0	18	0
Ceará	2018	Série A	11	3	11	0	4	0	—		7	0	33	3
Ceará	2019	Série A	15	0	3	0	2	0	—		4	0	24	0
Ceará	2020	Série A	20	1	4	0	4	0	—		1	0	29	1
Ceará	2021	Série A	0	0	0	0	0	0	0	0	3	0	3	0
Ceará	Total		46	4	18	0	10	0	0	0	15	0	89	4
Juventude (loan)	2021	Série A	28	1	5	1	1	0	—		—		34	2
Career total			199	26	94	4	23	0	0	0	29	1	345	31

== Honours ==
Ceará

- Campeonato Cearense: 2018
- Copa do Nordeste: 2020
