= Dênis Marques =

Brazilian footballer (born 1981)

Personal information
- Full name: Dênis Marques do Nascimento
- Date of birth: February 22, 1981 (age 45)
- Place of birth: Maceió, Brazil
- Height: 1.83 m (6 ft 0 in)
- Position: Striker

Youth career
- 2000–2001: Mogi Mirim

Senior career*
Years	Team	Apps	(Gls)
2002–2004	Mogi Mirim	11	(8)
2003–2004	→ Al-Kuwait (loan)	?	(?)
2004–2007	Atlético Paranaense	65	(17)
2007–2010	Omiya Ardija	42	(11)
2009–2010	→ Flamengo (loan)	19	(6)
2012–2013	Santa Cruz	54	(36)
2014	ABC		
- * Club domestic league appearances and goals

Dênis Marques do Nascimento or simply Dênis Marques (born February 22, 1981), is a retired Brazilian football striker.

== Club statistics ==
Club performance			League		Cup		League Cup		Total	
Season	Club	League	Apps	Goals	Apps	Goals	Apps	Goals	Apps	Goals
Japan			League		Emperor's Cup		J.League Cup		Total	
2007	Omiya Ardija	J1 League	13	2	0	0	0	0	13	2
2008	Omiya Ardija	J1 League	20	8	0	0	3	1	23	9
2009	Omiya Ardija	J1 League	9	1	0	0	4	0	13	1
Country	Japan		42	11	0	0	7	1	49	12
Total			42	11	0	0	7	1	49	12

=== Flamengo career statistics ===
(Correct as of May 12, 2010)

Club	Season	Carioca League			Brazilian Série A			Brazilian Cup			Copa Libertadores			Copa Sudamericana			Total		
Club	Season	Apps	Goals	Assists	Apps	Goals	Assists	Apps	Goals	Assists	Apps	Goals	Assists	Apps	Goals	Assists	Apps	Goals	Assists
Flamengo	2009	-	-	-	12	2	0	-	-	-	-	-	-	2	1	0	14	3	0
Flamengo	2010	2	1	0	1	1	0	-	-	-	1	0	0	-	-	-	4	2	0
Total		2	0	0	13	3	0	-	-	-	1	0	0	2	1	0	18	4	0

according to combined sources on the Flamengo official website.

=== Santa Cruz career statistics ===
Club	Season	Pernambucano League			Brazilian Série C			Brazilian Cup			Nordeste Cup			Total		
Club	Season	Apps	Goals	Assists	Apps	Goals	Assists	Apps	Goals	Assists	Apps	Goals	Assists	Apps	Goals	Assists
Santa Cruz	2012	17	15	2	18	11	3	2	1	1	-	-	-	37	27	6
Santa Cruz	2013	13	7	2	-	-	-	3	1	0	1	1	0	14	7	2
Total		30	22	4	18	11	3	6	2	1	1	1	0	54	36	8

== Honours ==
=== Individual ===
- Brazilian Cup Top Scorer: 2007

=== Club ===
Atlético Paranaense

- Paraná State League: 2005

Flamengo

- Brazilian Série A: 2009

Santa Cruz

- Pernambuco State League: 2012, 2013
- Campeonato Brasileiro Série C: 2013
