= Nininho (footballer, born 1992) =

Brazilian footballer

Personal information
- Full name: Salatiel Bartolomeu De Paiva Filho
- Date of birth: February 7, 1992 (age 34)
- Place of birth: Recife, Brazil
- Height: 1.75 m (5 ft 9 in)
- Position: Right-back

Youth career
- 2007–2009: Santa Cruz
- 2009–2011: Sport Recife
- 2012–2013: Santa Cruz
- 2012: → Jaguar (loan)

Senior career*
Years	Team	Apps	(Gls)
2013–2018	Santa Cruz	95	(2)
2015	→ América de Natal (loan)	3	(0)
2016	→ Boa Esporte (loan)	5	(0)
2018	Red Bull Brasil	8	(0)
2018	Remo	11	(1)
2018–2019	Paços de Ferreira	7	(0)
2020	Remo	4	(0)
2020	Portuguesa		(0)
- * Club domestic league appearances and goals as of 22:51, 21 December 2020 (UTC)

Salatiel Bartolomeu De Paiva Filho (born February 7, 1992), known as Nininho, is a Brazilian football player who plays as a right-back.

== Honours ==
Santa Cruz

- Campeonato Pernambucano: 2013, 2015
- Campeonato Brasileiro Série C: 2013
