= Natan (footballer, born 1990) =

Brazilian footballer

Personal information
- Full name: Natan Carneiro de Lima
- Date of birth: November 8, 1990 (age 36)
- Place of birth: Pé de Serra, Brazil
- Height: 1.72 m (5 ft 8 in)
- Position: Midfielder

Team information
- Current team: Vitória da Conquista

Youth career
- 2007–2008: Cruzeiro-BA
- 2009–2010: Santa Cruz

Senior career*
Years	Team	Apps	(Gls)
2010–2015	Santa Cruz	70	(4)
2015–2016	Criciúma	36	(2)
2016–2017	Cuiabá	14	(0)
2017	Santa Cruz	6	(0)
2018	Sergipe	5	(0)
2018	Decisão	0	(0)
2019	Sergipe	0	(0)
2019	→ Decisão (loan)	0	(0)
2019	Flamengo PE	0	(0)
2020–	Vitória da Conquista	0	(0)
- * Club domestic league appearances and goals as of 16:02, 24 June 2019 (UTC)

Natan Carneiro de Lima (born November 9, 1990) is a Brazilian footballer who plays as a midfielder for Vitória da Conquista.
