= Estádio Passo das Emas =

Football stadium in Lucas do Rio Verde, Brazil

- Passo das Emas
- Interactive map of Estádio Passo das Emas
- Full name: Estádio Municipal Passo das Emas
- Location: Lucas do Rio Verde, Mato Grosso, Brazil
- Coordinates: 13°04′28″S 55°55′27″W
- Capacity: 10,000
- Surface: Grass

Construction
- Built: 2004
- Opened: 2004
- Renovated: 2014
- Expanded: 2014

Tenant
- Luverdense

The Estádio Municipal Passo das Emas, also known as Passo das Emas, is a football stadium inaugurated on 2004 in Lucas do Rio Verde neighborhood, in the Brazilian state of Mato Grosso, with a maximum capacity of 10,000 spectators.

== History ==
The stadium was built in 2004 and the inaugural match was played on 20 March 2014 when Santa Cruz Esporte Clube beat Luverdense Esporte Clube 1–0. It was expanded in 2014, and had a Copa do Brasil 1–0 win from Luverdense against Corinthians in the previous year, also being the stadium's biggest attendance.
