= Emerson Santos (footballer, born 1992) =

Brazilian footballer

Personal information
- Full name: Emerson Gustavo Pinto dos Santos
- Date of birth: 27 February 1992 (age 34)
- Place of birth: Feira de Santana, Brazil
- Height: 1.78 m (5 ft 10 in)
- Position: Defensive midfielder

Team information
- Current team: Inter de Limeira
- Number: 31

Youth career
- 2008–2011: Grêmio

Senior career*
Years	Team	Apps	(Gls)
2011–2015	Grêmio	1	(0)
2012–2013	→ Coritiba (loan)	9	(0)
2014–2015	→ Santa Cruz (loan)	25	(1)
2016	Mogi Mirim	6	(0)
2017	Passo Fundo	5	(0)
2018	Tricordiano	9	(2)
2018	Aimoré	13	(3)
2019	Operário MS	12	(2)
2019–2020	São Caetano	25	(6)
2020	Ferroviária	1	(1)
2021–2022	Botafogo-SP	37	(0)
2022	→ Bahia (loan)	22	(0)
2023	Juventude	17	(0)
2024	Ponte Preta	44	(0)
2025	São Bernardo	25	(0)
2026–	Inter de Limeira	22	(0)
- * Club domestic league appearances and goals as of 9 November 2206

Emerson Gustavo Pinto dos Santos (born 27 February 1992), known as Emerson Santos, is a Brazilian professional footballer who plays as a defensive midfielder for Inter de Limeira.

== Honours ==
Coritiba

- Campeonato Paranaense: 2012, 2013
