= Oziel (footballer) =

Brazilian footballer

Personal information
- Full name: Oziel França da Silva
- Date of birth: 10 August 1984 (age 42)
- Place of birth: João Pessoa, Brazil
- Height: 1.69 m (5 ft 7 in)
- Position: Right-back

Team information
- Current team: Duque de Caxias
- Number: 2

Senior career*
Years	Team	Apps	(Gls)
2005–2008	Cabofriense	2	(0)
2005	→ Bangu (loan)	0	(0)
2005	→ Botafogo (loan)	11	(0)
2006	→ Paysandu (loan)	27	(0)
2007	→ Ituano (loan)	4	(0)
2007	→ Macaé (loan)	0	(0)
2008–2010	Tigres do Brasil	28	(6)
2009	→ Duque de Caxias (loan)	33	(0)
2010	Ceará	25	(1)
2011	Goiás	23	(0)
2012–2013	Guarani	55	(3)
2013	Náutico	2	(0)
2013–2014	Santa Cruz	34	(1)
2015–2016	Guarani	27	(0)
2017	Tigres do Brasil	4	(0)
2017	Duque de Caxias	18	(0)
2018	XV de Piracicaba	14	(0)
2018	Duque de Caxias	16	(0)
2018	Portuguesa	5	(0)
2019–	Duque de Caxias	40	(0)
- * Club domestic league appearances and goals

Oziel França da Silva (born 10 August 1984), known as just Oziel, is a Brazilian footballer who plays as a right-back for Duque de Caxias.

Oziel played for Ceará in the 2010 Campeonato Brasileiro Série A. He is best-known for his spell at Guarani FC, where he helped the club reach the 2012 Campeonato Paulista final for the first time in 24 years.
