= Raul (footballer, born 1981) =

Brazilian footballer

Personal information
- Full name: Raul Victor da Silva Cajazeiras
- Date of birth: 26 July 1981 (age 45)
- Place of birth: Fortaleza, Brazil
- Height: 1.83 m (6 ft 0 in)
- Position: Attacking midfielder

Senior career*
| Years | Team | Apps | (Gls) |
| 1998–2003 | Ceará | | |
| 2004 | SC Internacional | | |
| 2005–2006 | Ferroviário | | |
| 2007 | Goiás | | |
| 2007 | → Gama (Loan) | | |
| 2008 | Fortaleza | | |
| 2008 | → Horizonte (Loan) | | |
| 2009 | Goiás | 3 | (0) |
| 2010 | Anapolina | | |
| 2010 | Icasa | 10 | (2) |
| 2011 | ASA | 35 | (7) |
| 2012–2013 | ABC | 45 | (11) |
| 2013–2014 | Santa Cruz | 59 | (10) |
- * Club domestic league appearances and goals

Raul Victor da Silva Cajazeiras, or simply Raul (born 26 July 1981), is a Brazilian footballer who plays as an attacking midfielder for Santa Cruz FC.

== Honours ==
- Alagoas State League: 2011
- Ceará Liga: 1998, 1999, 2008
- Goiás State League: 2009
- Rio Grande do Sul State League: 2004
