= Renan Fonseca =

Brazilian footballer

Personal information
- Full name: Renan de Oliveira Fonseca
- Date of birth: 13 August 1990 (age 36)
- Place of birth: Ouro Fino, Brazil
- Height: 1.90 m (6 ft 3 in)
- Position: Centre-back

Team information
- Current team: Galo Maringá

Youth career
- 2006–2009: Ponte Preta

Senior career*
Years	Team	Apps	(Gls)
2009–2010	Ponte Preta	13	(1)
2011	→ CRAC (loan)	5	(0)
2011	Red Bull Brasil	0	(0)
2012	Marília	1	(1)
2012	Ituano	0	(0)
2013–2014	Santa Cruz	59	(3)
2015–2017	Botafogo	54	(2)
2018–2019	Ponte Preta	108	(3)
2020	Oeste	17	(1)
2021–2022	Inter de Limeira	25	(1)
2023–	Galo Maringá	5	(0)
- * Club domestic league appearances and goals as of 12 March 2023

Renan de Oliveira Fonseca (born 13 August 1990) is a Brazilian professional footballer who plays as a centre-back for Galo Maringá.
