= Jefferson Maranhão (footballer, born 1993) =

Brazilian footballer

Personal information
- Full name: Jefferson Douglas Damião Correia
- Date of birth: August 6, 1993 (age 33)
- Place of birth: Coelho Neto, Maranhão, Brazil
- Height: 1.62 m (5 ft 4 in)
- Position: Attacking midfielder

Team information
- Current team: Jacuipense on loan from (Santa Cruz)
- Number: 10

Youth career
- 2008–2011: Santa Cruz

Senior career*
Years	Team	Apps	(Gls)
2011–	Santa Cruz	69	(5)
2014	→ Central (loan)	6	(0)
2015–	→ Jacuipense (loan)	0	(0)
- * Club domestic league appearances and goals

Jefferson Douglas Damião Correia (born August 6, 1993), known as Jefferson Maranhão, is a Brazilian football who plays as a attacking midfielder for Jacuipense on loan from Santa Cruz.
