= Renatinho (footballer, born 1991) =

Brazilian footballer

Personal information
- Full name: Renato Gonçalves de Lima
- Date of birth: 14 September 1991 (age 35)
- Place of birth: Serra Talhada, Brazil
- Height: 1.60 m (5 ft 3 in)
- Positions: Attacking midfielder; left-back

Youth career
- 2009–2011: Santa Cruz

Senior career*
| Years | Team | Apps | (Gls) |
| 2011–2016 | Santa Cruz | 197 | (17) |
| 2017 | Campinense | 7 | (2) |
| 2017 | → Fortaleza (loan) | 2 | (0) |
| 2017–2018 | Qadsia SC | | (1) |
| 2019–2020 | Birkirkara | 0 | (0) |
- * Club domestic league appearances and goals

Renato Gonçalves de Lima (born 14 September 1991), known as Renatinho, is a Brazilian former professional footballer who played as a midfielder.

== Career ==
In the second half of 2014, he reached the milestone of 140 games and 15 goals.

On 29 June 2019, Renatinho joined Maltese club Birkirkara.
