= Panda (footballer) =

Brazilian footballer (born 1984)

Personal information
- Full name: Márcio Gama Moreira
- Date of birth: July 9, 1984 (age 42)
- Place of birth: Fortaleza, Brazil
- Height: 1.77 m (5 ft 10 in)
- Position: Left-back

Team information
- Current team: Santa Cruz
- Number: 15

Senior career*
Years	Team	Apps	(Gls)
2004	Cruzeiro-PoA		
2005	São José		
2006	Uruburetama FC		
2007	Itapipoca		
2007–2010	ABC	8	(0)
2009	→Icasa (loan)	10	(1)
2010–2011	Icasa	47	(3)
2011	Guarany de Sobral	7	(0)
2012	Clube do Remo	0	(0)
2012	Guarani de Juazeiro		
2013	Campinense	15	(1)
2013–2014	Santa Cruz	13	(1)
2015	Treze		
2015	Serrano-PB		
2016–2017	CSA	30	(2)
2018	Manaus	10	(1)
2019	CRAC	7	(1)
2019–2020	Manaus	14	(1)
2021	Porto Velho	9	(1)
- * Club domestic league appearances and goals as of 28 August 2021

Márcio Gama Moreira (born July 9, 1984), known as Panda, is a Brazilian football who plays as a left-back for Porto Velho.
