= Leandro Souza (footballer, born 1986) =

Brazilian footballer

Personal information
- Full name: Leandro Rosa Souza
- Date of birth: February 24, 1986 (age 40)
- Place of birth: Rio de Janeiro, Brazil
- Height: 1.87 m (6 ft 2 in)
- Position: Central defender

Team information
- Current team: Santo André

Youth career
- 2002–2003: Campo Grande

Senior career*
| Years | Team | Apps | (Gls) |
| 2004–2007 | Joinville | 0 | (0) |
| 2008 | Athletico Paranaense | 1 | (0) |
| 2009 | Avaí | 0 | (0) |
| 2009 | Bangu | 0 | (0) |
| 2010 | Arapongas | 0 | (0) |
| 2011–2014 | Santa Cruz | 46 | (0) |
| 2013 | → Guarani (loan) | 8 | (0) |
| 2015 | Cabofriense | 11 | (0) |
| 2015 | ASA | 9 | (0) |
| 2016–2021 | CSA | 128 | (9) |
| 2019 | → Cuiabá (loan) | 9 | (0) |
| 2021– | Santo André | 0 | (0) |
- * Club domestic league appearances and goals

Leandro Rosa Souza (born February 24, 1986, in Rio de Janeiro), is a Brazilian central defender. He currently plays for Santo André.

== Honours ==
Avaí

- Campeonato Catarinense: 2009

Santa Cruz

- Campeonato Pernambucano: 2011, 2012
- Campeonato Brasileiro Série C: 2013

CSA

- Campeonato Brasileiro Série C: 2017
