= Tiago Costa (Brazilian footballer) =

Brazilian footballer

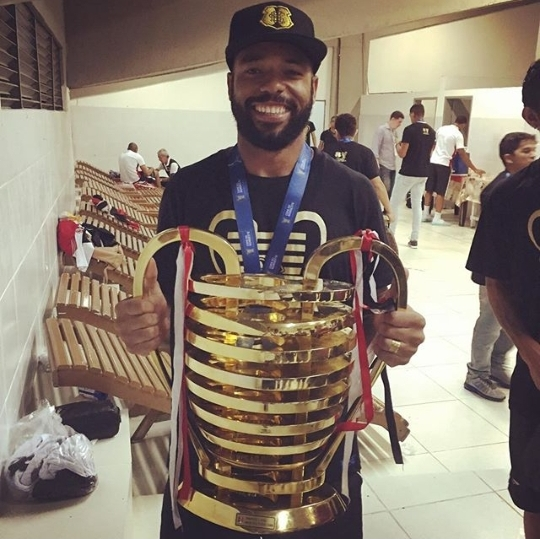

Personal information
- Full name: Tiago da Costa Silva
- Date of birth: 13 April 1987 (age 39)
- Place of birth: Rio de Janeiro, Brazil
- Height: 1.75 m (5 ft 9 in)
- Position: Left-back

Team information
- Current team: Retrô FC Brasil

Senior career*
Years	Team	Apps	(Gls)
2007–2010	Artsul		
2008	→ Condor AC (loan)		
2009	→ Castelo Branco (loan)		(0)
2010–2012	Volta Redonda	12	(0)
2012–2014	Santa Cruz	43	(1)
2015	Ceará	0	(0)
2015	Santa Cruz	0	(0)
2015–2016	Chapecoense	2	(0)
2016–2017	Santa Cruz	31	(2)
2018	Novorizontino	1	(0)
2018	Náutico	8	(0)
2019	Joinville	1	(0)
2020–	Retrô FC Brasil	0	(0)
- * Club domestic league appearances and goals as of 21:42, 11 July 2019 (UTC)

Tiago da Costa Silva (born 13 April 1987 in Rio de Janeiro), known as Tiago Costa, is a Brazilian footballer who plays for Retrô Futebol Clube Brasil as a left-back.
