= Lacerdão =

Stadium

Coordinates: 8°16′43″S 35°58′23″W

Estádio Luiz José de Lacerda
- Lacerdão
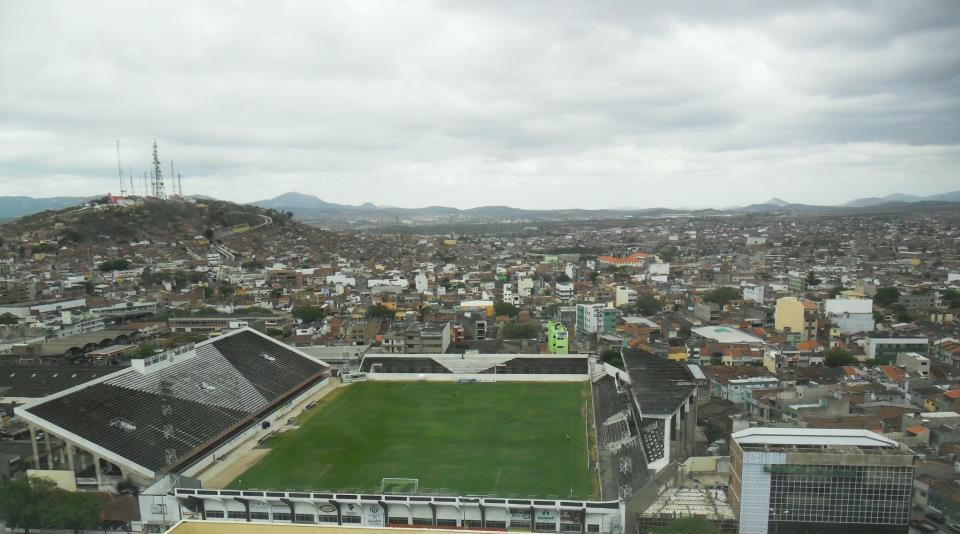
- Sisbrace
- Interactive map of Estádio Luiz José de Lacerda
- Full name: Estádio Luiz José de Lacerda
- Former names: Estádio Pedro Victor de Albuquerque
- Location: Caruaru, Brazil
- Owner: Central Sport Club
- Capacity: 19,478

Construction
- Opened: 19 October 1980
- Renovated: 1980s

Tenant
- Central Sport Club

Estádio Luiz José de Lacerda, usually known as Lacerdão, is a multi-purpose stadium in Caruaru, Pernambuco, Brazil. It is currently used primarily for football matches. The stadium was built in 1980 and has a capacity of 30,000.

The Lacerdão is owned by Central Sport Club. The stadium is named after Luiz José de Lacerda, who was president of Central Sport Club from 1962 to 1964, 1966, 1977 to 1983, and 1992 to 1993.

== History ==
In 1980, the works on Lacerdão were completed. The inaugural match was played on 19 October of that year, when Central defeated the Nigeria national football team 3–1. The first goal of the stadium was scored by Central's Gil Mineiro.

The stadium's attendance record currently stands at 24,450 when Central beat Flamengo 2–1 on 22 October 1986.

In the 1980s, the stadium was reformed and renamed to its current name. Its original name was Estádio Pedro Victor de Albuquerque. Pedro Victor de Albuquerque was one of the first presidents of Central.
