= 2013 Copa do Nordeste =

Tournament details
- Country: Brazil
- Teams: 16

Final positions
- Champions: Campinense (1st title)
- Runners-up: ASA

Tournament statistics
- Matches played: 62
- Goals scored: 158 (2.55 per match)
- Top goal scorer(s): Marcelo Nicácio; Rodrigo Silva (5 goals each)

The 2013 Copa do Nordeste was a football competition held in the Brazilian Northeast, counting as the 10th edition in the history of the Copa do Nordeste. It was played from January 19, with its final on 10 and 17 March, featuring 16 clubs, with Bahia and Pernambuco having three berths each and Ceará, Rio Grande do Norte and Sergipe, Alagoas and Paraíba having two each.

Campinense won the title by defeating ASA in the final.

== Transmission ==
- Rede Globo – only for the northeast region of Brazil
- TV Esporte Interativo – all games for all Brazil

== Teams ==
The clubs were separated into pots according to their ranking in the ranking of CBF.

Pot 1	Pot 2	Pot 3	Pot 4
Bahia (14th); Sport (17th); Vitória (20th); Santa Cruz (22nd)	Ceará (24th); Fortaleza (28th); América-RN (29th); CRB (37th)	ABC (47th); Confiança (79th); Campinense (80th); ASA (88th)	Itabaiana (104th); Salgueiro (127th); Sousa (245th); Feirense (n/a)

== Group stage ==
=== Group A ===
Team	Pld	W	D	L	GF	GA	GD	Pts	ABC	CEA	BAH	ITA
ABC	6	3	1	2	12	6	+6	10		3–0	1–1	4–1
Ceará	6	3	1	2	6	5	+1	10	1–0		0–1	3–0
Bahia	6	2	2	2	6	8	−2	8	0–3	1–2		3–2
Itabaiana	6	1	2	3	6	11	−5	5	3–1	0–0	0–0	

Legend: Blue = home team win; Yellow = draw; Red = away team win.

=== Group B ===
Team	Pld	W	D	L	GF	GA	GD	Pts	SPO	FOR	CON	SOU
Sport	6	3	3	0	13	3	+10	12		3–0	3–1	6–1
Fortaleza	6	3	1	2	7	6	+1	10	0–0		3–0	3–0
Confiança	6	2	2	2	7	8	−1	8	0–0	3–0		2–2
Sousa	6	0	2	4	4	14	−10	2	1–1	0–1	0–1	

Legend: Blue = home team win; Yellow = draw; Red = away team win.

=== Group C ===
Team	Pld	W	D	L	GF	GA	GD	Pts	VIT	ASA	AME	SAL
Vitória	6	4	1	1	11	6	+5	13		2–1	1–1	5–1
ASA	6	3	0	3	6	5	+1	9	2–0		0–1	2–1
América	6	2	1	3	6	6	0	7	1–2	0–1		2–0
Salgueiro	6	2	0	4	5	11	−6	6	0–1	1–0	2–1	

Legend: Blue = home team win; Yellow = draw; Red = away team win.

=== Group D ===
Team	Pld	W	D	L	GF	GA	GD	Pts	STC	CAM	CRB	FER
Santa Cruz	6	5	0	1	9	5	+4	15		2–0	1–0	2–0
Campinense	6	4	1	1	9	5	+4	13	3–0		1–0	1–0
CRB	6	2	0	4	8	9	−1	6	2–3	1–2		3–1
Feirense	6	0	1	5	4	11	−7	1	0–1	2–2	1–2	

Legend: Blue = home team win; Yellow = draw; Red = away team win.

== Knockout stages ==
=== Quarterfinals ===
Team 1	Agg.	Team 2	1st leg	2nd leg
ABC	1–2	ASA	0–0	1–2
Vitória	3–4	Ceará	2–0	1–4
Sport	3–3(a)	Campinense	1–1	2–2
Santa Cruz	4–5	Fortaleza	3–3	1–2

== Semi-finals ==
Team 1	Agg.	Team 2	1st leg	2nd leg
ASA	4–3	Ceará	3–3	1–0
Fortaleza	2–2(a)	Campinense	2–1	0–1

=== Finals ===
March 10, 2013
16:00

ASA	1 – 2	Campinense
Wanderson 90+3'	Report	Tiago Granja 5'; Jeferson Maranhense 60'

Estádio Fumeirão, Arapiraca
Referee: Pablo Ramon Gonçalves Pinheiro

March 17, 2013
16:00

Campinense	2 – 0	ASA
Jeferson Maranhense 46'; Ricardo Maranhão 79'	Report

Estádio Amigão, Campina Grande
Referee: Jaílson Macedo Freitas
