= Estádio do Arruda =

Football stadium in Recife, Brazil

Mundão do Arruda
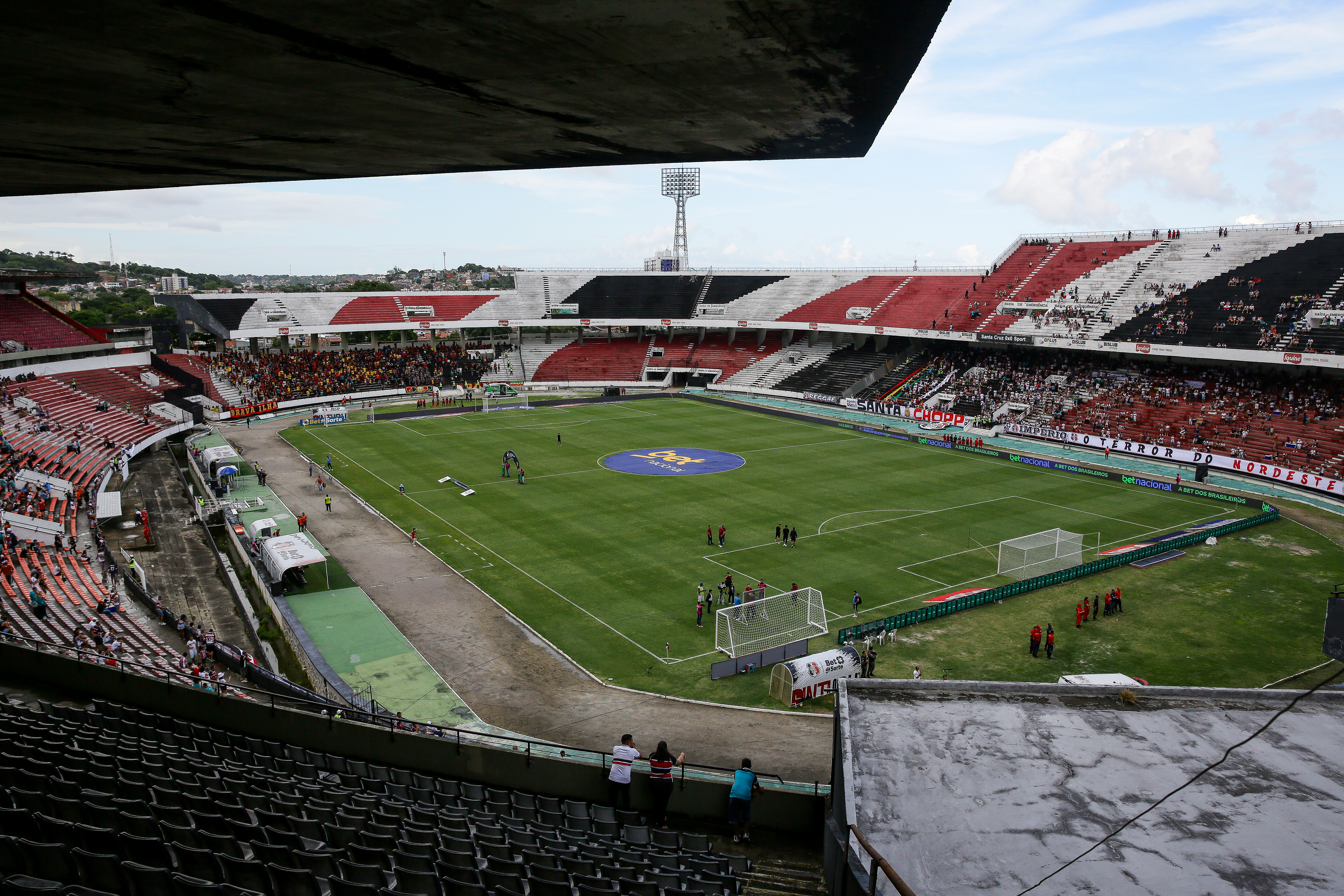
- Sisbrace
- Interactive map of Mundão do Arruda
- Location: Avenida Beberibe, 1285, Recife
- Coordinates: 8°1′36.16″S 34°53′28.23″W
- Owner: Santa Cruz Futebol Clube
- Capacity: 50,000 (limited); 55,582
- Surface: Grass

Construction
- Opened: 4 June 1972
- Architect: Various

Tenant
- Santa Cruz (1972–present)

Estádio José do Rego Maciel, also known as Estádio do Arruda, is a multi-purpose stadium in Recife, Brazil. It is currently used mostly for football matches. The stadium was built in 1972 and is able to hold 60,044 spectators. Estádio do Arruda is owned by Santa Cruz Futebol Clube. The stadium is named after José do Rego Maciel, who was Recife's mayor between 1952 and 1955.

== History ==
The mayor José do Rego Maciel donated in 1955 a groundplot to Santa Cruz. This groundplot is the place where the stadium was built. The stadium was inaugurated on June 4, 1972.

The inaugural match was played on June 4, 1972, when Santa Cruz beat an Amateur Brazil National team 1–0. The first goal of the stadium was scored by Santa Cruz's Betinho.

The stadium's attendance record currently stands at 90,200, set on March 23, 1994 when Brazil beat Argentina 2–0. Since then the capacity of the stadium has reduced due to safety reasons.

The Ex-Beatle Paul McCartney played 2 concerts at the stadium during On the Run Tour on April 21 & 22, 2012. It was his first time in Recife.
