= Flávio Caça-Rato =

Brazilian footballer (born 1986)

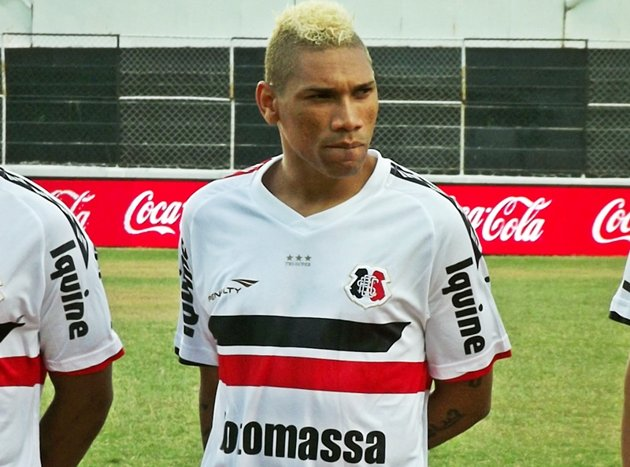

Personal information
- Full name: Flávio Augusto do Nascimento
- Date of birth: 29 June 1986 (age 40)
- Place of birth: Recife, Brazil
- Height: 1.76 m (5 ft 9 in)
- Position: Forward

Team information
- Current team: Sete de Setembro U20 (coach)

Youth career
- 2005: Sport Recife

Senior career*
Years	Team	Apps	(Gls)
2005–2008	Sport Recife		
2006	→ Salgueiro (loan)		
2007	→ SEV (loan)		
2008–2009	Omiš		
2009–2011	Cabense		
2010	→ América de Natal (loan)		
2010	→ Timbaúba (loan)		
2011–2015	Santa Cruz	59	(7)
2015	Remo		
2016	Guarani		
2016	Duque de Caxias		
2017	Tupi		
2018	Vitória da Conquista		
2019	Decisão		
2022	Futebol Náutico-RR		
2022	Cacerense		
2023	Atlético Torres		
2023	Sete de Setembro		
- * Club domestic league appearances and goals

Flávio Augusto do Nascimento (born 29 June 1986 in Recife), commonly known as Flávio Caça-Rato or simply Caça-Rato (English: Rat Catcher), is a Brazilian footballer

== Personal life ==
When Caça Rato was 8, his father came home drunk and tried to hang him. When he was almost being hanged his uncle saved him.

Caça-Rato was also shot twice on 21 August 2010 in the town of Campinas, São Paulo. The incident took place during a party after a Guarani match — the team he played for at the time. Flavio got caught in an argument with two men, and one of them pulled a gun and shot him in the right leg and on the back. After staying in a hospital, Flavio was medicated and discharged. He started playing football again after a month.

== Honours ==
Sport

- Campeonato Pernambucano : 2007, 2008, 2011, 2012, 2013
- Série C : 2013
- Copa do Brasil : 2008

Remo

- Campeonato Paraense : 2015
- Campeonato Pernambucano Série A2 : 2019
