= 2013 Campeonato Brasileiro Série C =

Campeonato Brasileiro Série C
- Season: 2013
- Champions: Santa Cruz
- Promoted: Luverdense; Sampaio Corrêa; Santa Cruz; Vila Nova
- Relegated: Baraúnas; Barueri; Brasiliense; Ipatinga; Rio Branco
- Matches played: 214
- Goals scored: 514 (2.4 per match)
- Top goalscorer: Assisinho (12 goals)

The 2013 Campeonato Brasileiro Série C, the third level of the Brazilian League, was contested by 21 clubs, and started on June 1 and ended on December 1, 2013. The four teams in the semifinals were promoted to the 2014 Campeonato Brasileiro Série B, and the worst three teams in Group A and the two worst teams in Group B were relegated to the 2014 Campeonato Brasileiro Série D.

== Teams ==
| Team | Home city | State |
|---|---|---|
| Águia de Marabá | Marabá | PA |
| Baraúnas | Mossoró | RN |
| Betim | Betim | MG |
| Brasiliense | Taguatinga | DF |
| Caxias | Caxias do Sul | RS |
| CRAC | Catalão | GO |
| CRB | Maceió | AL |
| Cuiabá | Cuiabá | MT |
| Duque de Caxias | Duque de Caxias | RJ |
| Fortaleza | Fortaleza | CE |
| Grêmio Barueri | Barueri | SP |
| Guarani | Campinas | SP |
| Luverdense | Lucas do Rio Verde | MT |
| Macaé | Macaé | RJ |
| Madureira | Rio de Janeiro | RJ |
| Mogi Mirim | Mogi Mirim | SP |
| Rio Branco | Rio Branco | AC |
| Sampaio Corrêa | São Luís | MA |
| Santa Cruz | Recife | PE |
| Treze | Campina Grande | PB |
| Vila Nova | Goiânia | GO |

== First stage ==
=== Group A ===
==== Standings ====
| Pos | Team | Pld | W | D | L | GF | GA | GD | Pts | Qualification or relegation |
|---|---|---|---|---|---|---|---|---|---|---|
| 1 | Santa Cruz (Q) | 20 | 10 | 4 | 6 | 31 | 19 | +12 | 34 | Advances to Final Stage |
| 2 | Luverdense (Q) | 20 | 10 | 4 | 6 | 30 | 20 | +10 | 34 | Advances to Final Stage |
| 3 | Treze (Q) | 20 | 10 | 3 | 7 | 27 | 33 | −6 | 33 | Advances to Final Stage |
| 4 | Sampaio Corrêa (Q) | 20 | 9 | 6 | 5 | 34 | 19 | +15 | 33 | Advances to Final Stage |
| 5 | Fortaleza | 20 | 9 | 5 | 6 | 38 | 23 | +15 | 32 | |
| 6 | CRB | 20 | 9 | 5 | 6 | 24 | 17 | +7 | 32 | |
| 7 | Águia de Marabá | 20 | 9 | 4 | 7 | 30 | 27 | +3 | 31 | |
| 8 | Cuiabá | 20 | 8 | 6 | 6 | 31 | 21 | +10 | 30 | |
| 9 | Brasiliense (R) | 20 | 8 | 6 | 6 | 20 | 21 | −1 | 30 | Relegation to Série D |
| 10 | Baraúnas (R) | 20 | 4 | 1 | 15 | 17 | 44 | −27 | 13 | Relegation to Série D |
| 11 | Rio Branco-AC (R) | 20 | 2 | 0 | 18 | 8 | 46 | −38 | 6 | Relegation to Série D |

Updated to match(es) played on September 12, 2013. Source:
(Q) Qualified for the phase indicated; (R) Relegated

==== Results ====
| Home \ Away | AGM | BAR | BRS | CRB | CUI | FOR | LUV | RBR | SAM | SCR | TRZ |
|---|---|---|---|---|---|---|---|---|---|---|---|
| Águia de Marabá | | 3–1 | 2–1 | 1–0 | 0–0 | 1–1 | 4–0 | 1–0 | 0–2 | 1–1 | 5–2 |
| Baraúnas | 0–3 | | 0–1 | 0–3 | 2–6 | 1–4 | 0–1 | 2–1 | 1–0 | 1–3 | 0–2 |
| Brasiliense | 2–0 | 0–0 | | 0–0 | 1–2 | 1–0 | 0–1 | 1–0 | 2–1 | 0–0 | 2–2 |
| CRB | 3–1 | 3–2 | 0–1 | | 1–1 | 2–0 | 4–0 | 2–0 | 1–0 | 2–1 | 0–1 |
| Cuiabá | 3–0 | 3–1 | 1–2 | 1–1 | | 1–1 | 1–2 | 3–0 | 1–0 | 1–3 | 4–0 |
| Fortaleza | 2–2 | 3–0 | 2–2 | 3–0 | 3–0 | | 2–1 | 6–0 | 2–2 | 2–0 | 3–2 |
| Luverdense | 3–0 | 2–0 | 1–0 | 2–2 | 1–1 | 2–0 | | 4–0 | 2–2 | 3–1 | 4–0 |
| Rio Branco-AC | 1–2 | 1–3 | 1–2 | 1–0 | 0–2 | 0–2 | 1–0 | | 0–3 | 0–2 | 1–2 |
| Sampaio Corrêa | 0–1 | 4–1 | 5–1 | 2–1 | 0–0 | 2–1 | 1–1 | 2–1 | | 3–0 | 4–2 |
| Santa Cruz | 3–2 | 0–2 | 2–0 | 0–0 | 1–0 | 2–1 | 2–0 | 4–0 | 0–0 | | 6–0 |
| Treze | 2–1 | 1–0 | 1–1 | 0–1 | 2–0 | 2–0 | 1–0 | 3–0 | 1–1 | 1–0 | |

Legend: Blue = home team win; Yellow = draw; Red = away team win.

=== Group B ===
==== Standings ====
| Pos | Team | Pld | W | D | L | GF | GA | GD | Pts | Qualification or relegation |
|---|---|---|---|---|---|---|---|---|---|---|
| 1 | Macaé (Q) | 18 | 9 | 4 | 5 | 27 | 20 | +7 | 31 | Advances to Final Stage |
| 2 | Vila Nova (Q) | 18 | 8 | 5 | 5 | 20 | 13 | +7 | 29 | Advances to Final Stage |
| 3 | Caxias (Q) | 18 | 8 | 5 | 5 | 17 | 15 | +2 | 29 | Advances to Final Stage |
| 4 | Betim (Q) | 18 | 7 | 7 | 4 | 21 | 17 | +4 | 28 | Advances to Final Stage |
| 5 | Mogi Mirim | 18 | 8 | 3 | 7 | 23 | 18 | +5 | 27 | |
| 6 | Guarani | 18 | 5 | 9 | 4 | 15 | 13 | +2 | 24 | |
| 7 | Duque de Caxias | 18 | 4 | 7 | 7 | 19 | 22 | −3 | 19 | |
| 9 | Madureira | 18 | 3 | 10 | 5 | 17 | 17 | 0 | 19 | |
| 9 | CRAC (R) | 18 | 4 | 5 | 9 | 12 | 20 | −8 | 17 | Relegation to Série D |
| 10 | Barueri (R) | 18 | 4 | 5 | 9 | 20 | 36 | −16 | 17 | Relegation to Série D |

Updated to match(es) played on October 12, 2013. Source:
Rules for classification: 1) points; 2) goal difference; 3) number of goals scored.
(Q) Qualified for the phase indicated; (R) Relegated

==== Results ====
| Home \ Away | BET | CAX | CRA | DUQ | BAR | GUA | MAC | MAD | MOG | VIL |
|---|---|---|---|---|---|---|---|---|---|---|
| Betim | | 0–1 | 3–2 | 1–0 | 3–3 | 0–1 | 3–0 | 1–0 | 2–1 | 0–0 |
| Caxias | 1–2 | | 3–0 | 0–0 | 1–1 | 0–0 | 2–1 | 0–0 | 1–0 | 2–1 |
| CRAC | 0–0 | 0–1 | | 0–0 | 2–0 | 0–0 | 1–0 | 1–2 | 0–1 | 1–0 |
| Duque de Caxias | 3–2 | 1–0 | 1–1 | | 1–3 | 2–1 | 1–1 | 0–0 | 3–1 | 1–1 |
| Barueri | 1–1 | 0–2 | 1–0 | 3–2 | | 1–1 | 1–3 | 2–0 | 0–1 | 2–3 |
| Guarani | 1–2 | 0–1 | 1–1 | 1–0 | 0–0 | | 4–4 | 0–0 | 1–0 | 2–0 |
| Macaé | 0–0 | 2–0 | 2–1 | 1–0 | 4–0 | 0–1 | | 2–1 | 2–1 | 0–1 |
| Madureira | 1–1 | 1–1 | 0–2 | 2–1 | 6–0 | 0–0 | 2–2 | | 0–0 | 1–3 |
| Mogi Mirim | 2–0 | 2–1 | 4–0 | 3–2 | 3–1 | 1–1 | 1–2 | 1–1 | | 1–0 |
| Vila Nova | 0–0 | 4–0 | 1–0 | 1–1 | 3–1 | 1–0 | 0–1 | 0–0 | 1–0 | |

Legend: Blue = home team win; Yellow = draw; Red = away team win.

== Final stage ==
Quarter-finals
Santa Cruz | 1 | 2 | 3
Betim | 0 | 1 | 1
Luverdense | 2 | 2 | 4
Caxias | 1 | 0 | 1
Treze | 1 | 0 | 1
Vila Nova | 0 | 2 | 2
Sampaio Corrêa | 5 | 1 | 6
Macaé | 3 | 1 | 4

Semi-finals
Santa Cruz | 2 | 2 | 4
Luverdense | 0 | 1 | 1
Vila Nova | 0 | 1 | 1
Sampaio Corrêa | 0 | 2 | 2

Finals
Santa Cruz | 0 | 2 | 2
Sampaio Corrêa | 0 | 1 | 1

=== Finals ===
November 24, 2013
17:00 UTC−2

| Sampaio Corrêa | 0 – 0 | Santa Cruz |
|---|---|---|
| | Report |

Castelão, São Luís
Attendance: 25,901
Referee: Guilherme Ceretta de Lima

December 1, 2013
17:00 UTC−2

| Santa Cruz | 2 – 1 | Sampaio Corrêa |
|---|---|---|
| Dedé 33'; Flávio Caça-Rato 46' | Report | Cleitinho 55' |

Arruda, Recife
Attendance: 31,210
Referee: Luiz Flávio de Oliveira
