= 2012 Santa Cruz Futebol Clube season =

Santa Cruz
2012 season
- Chairman: Antônio Luiz Neto
- Manager: Zé Teodoro; Luciano Ribeiro (c); Sandro Barbosa
- Stadium: Estádio do Arruda
- Série C: 14th
- Copa do Brasil: First round
- Pernambucano: Champions (26th title)
- Top goalscorer: League: Dênis Marques (11); All: Dênis Marques (26)
Home colours	Away colours

The 2012 season was Santa Cruz's 99th season in the club's history. Santa Cruz competed in the Campeonato Pernambucano, Copa do Brasil and Série C.

== Squad ==
Note: Flags indicate national team as defined under FIFA eligibility rules; some limited exceptions apply. Players may hold more than one non-FIFA nationality.

No.	Pos.	Nation	Player
1	GK	BRA	Tiago Cardoso
2	DF	BRA	Diogo
3	DF	BRA	Leandro Souza
4	DF	BRA	Wiliam Alves
5	MF	BRA	Anderson Pedra
6	MF	BRA	Renatinho
7	MF	BRA	Memo (captain)
8	MF	BRA	Weslley
9	FW	BRA	Dênis Marques
10	MF	BRA	Luciano Henrique
11	FW	BRA	Flávio Caça-Rato
12	GK	BRA	Diego Lima
13	DF	BRA	César Lucena
14	MF	BRA	Leandro Oliveira
15	MF	BRA	Ramalho
17	MF	BRA	Natan
18	FW	BRA	Victor Hugo
19	FW	BRA	Geílson
20	FW	BRA	Paulista

No.	Pos.	Nation	Player
21	FW	BRA	Branquinho
22	DF	BRA	Maizena
23	MF	BRA	Sandro Manoel
24	GK	BRA	Cley Raguzoni
25	MF	BRA	Chicão
27	DF	BRA	Everton Sena
28	MF	BRA	Jefferson Maranhão
30	GK	BRA	Fred
31	MF	BRA	Jefferson Bruno
32	GK	BRA	Marlon
33	DF	BRA	Vágner
35	DF	BRA	Diego Bispo
38	DF	BRA	Tiago Costa
44	DF	BRA	Edson Borges
88	MF	BRA	Leozinho
89	MF	BRA	Thiago Henrique
92	MF	BRA	Jhonata
99	FW	BRA	Fabrício Ceará

== Statistics ==
=== Overall ===
Games played	46 (26 Pernambucano, 2 Copa do Brasil, 18 Série C)
Games won	22 (16 Pernambucano, 1 Copa do Brasil, 5 Série C)
Games drawn	10 (3 Pernambucano, 0 Copa do Brasil, 7 Série C)
Games lost	14 (7 Pernambucano, 1 Copa do Brasil, 6 Série C)
Goals scored	81
Goals conceded	53
Goal difference	+28
Best results (goal difference)	6–0 (H) v Petrolina – Pernambucano – 2012.02.25
Worst result (goal difference)	1–3 (H) v Sport – Pernambucano – 2012.02.16; 1–3 (A) v Icasa – Série C – 2012.10.06
Top scorer	Dênis Marques (26)

Source: Santa Cruz official website

=== Goalscorers ===
Place	Position	Nationality	Number	Name	Campeonato Pernambucano	Copa do Brasil	Série C	Total
1	FW	(Brazil)	9	Dênis Marques	14	1	11	26
2	MF	(Brazil)	10	Luciano Henrique	6	0	2	8
3	FW	(Brazil)	11	Flávio Caça-Rato	5	0	1	6
4	MF	(Brazil)	8	Weslley	4	0	1	5
5	FW	(Brazil)	99	Fabrício Ceará	0	0	4	4
5	FW	(Brazil)	19	Geílson	2	2	0	4
6	MF	(Brazil)	8	Léo Bartholo	3	0	0	3
6	MF	(Brazil)	6	Renatinho	3	0	0	3
6	DF	(Brazil)	3	William Alves	2	0	1	3
7	FW	(Brazil)	21	Branquinho	2	0	0	2
7	FW	(Brazil)	11	Carlinhos Bala	2	0	0	2
7	DF	(Brazil)	6	Dutra	2	0	0	2
7	MF	(Brazil)	88	Leozinho	0	0	2	2
7	MF	(Brazil)	7	Memo	1	1	0	2
8	DF	(Brazil)	4	André Oliveira	1	0	0	1
8	MF	(Brazil)	25	Chicão	1	0	0	1
8	DF	(Brazil)	44	Edson Borges	0	0	1	1
8	DF	(Brazil)	22	Eduardo Arroz	1	0	0	1
8	DF	(Brazil)	27	Everton Sena	0	0	1	1
8	MF	(Brazil)	14	Leandro Oliveira	0	0	1	1
8	MF	(Brazil)	17	Natan	1	0	0	1
				Own goals	1	0	1	2
				Total	51	4	26	81

== Competitions ==
=== Campeonato Pernambucano ===
==== First stage ====
15 January 2012 1	Santa Cruz	2–1	Belo Jardim	Recife
16:00 (UTC-3)	Weslley 54', 79'		Candinho 40'	Stadium: Estádio José do Rego Maciel (Arruda); Attendance: 28,650; Referee: Emerson Sobral

18 January 2012 2	Salgueiro	2–0	Santa Cruz	Salgueiro
21:00 (UTC-3)	Fabrício Ceará 34'; Elvis 48'			Stadium: Estádio Cornélio de Barros; Attendance: 8,158; Referee: Ricardo Tavares

22 January 2012 3	Serra Talhada	2–4	Santa Cruz	Serra Talhada
16:00 (UTC-3)	Ranieri 5'; Enercino 9'		Flávio Caça-Rato 20'; Eduardo Arroz 42'; Weslley 75'; Léo Bartholo 90+2'	Stadium: Estádio Nildo Pereira de Menezes; Attendance: 5,036; Referee: Nielson Nogueira Dias

25 January 2012 4	Santa Cruz	2–0	Ypiranga–PE	Recife
19:30 (UTC-3)	Léo Bartholo 47'; Renatinho 59'			Stadium: Estádio José do Rego Maciel (Arruda); Attendance: 24,525; Referee: Neilson Santos

28 January 2012 5	Araripina	2–0	Santa Cruz	Araripina
18:00 (UTC-3)	Vanderlei 5'; Cristóvão 88'			Stadium: Estádio Gilson Tiburtino de Souza (Chapadão do Araripe); Attendance: 5,460; Referee: Sebastião Rufino Filho

1 February 2012 6	Santa Cruz	0–0	Central	Recife
19:30 (UTC-3)				Stadium: Estádio José do Rego Maciel (Arruda); Attendance: 25,274; Referee: Ricardo Tavares

4 February 2012 7	Náutico	2–2	Santa Cruz	Recife
18:00 (UTC-3)	Cascata 60'; Souza 90+4'		Flávio Caça-Rato 11'; Elicarlos 60' (o.g.)	Stadium: Estádio Eládio de Barros Carvalho (Aflitos); Attendance: 15,075; Referee: Emerson Sobral

8 February 2012 8	Santa Cruz	3–1	Porto	Recife
20:00 (UTC-3)	Dênis Marques 45+2', 58', 61'		Moisés 33'	Stadium: Estádio José do Rego Maciel (Arruda); Attendance: 22,685; Referee: Gleydson Leite

12 February 2012 9	América–PE	0–1	Santa Cruz	Paulista
16:00 (UTC-3)			Dutra	Stadium: Estádio Ademir Cunha; Attendance: 8,849; Referee: Ricardo Jorge

16 February 2012 10	Santa Cruz	1–3	Sport	Recife
20:00 (UTC-3)	André Oliveira 90+2'	Report	Jheimy 43'; Marcelinho Paraíba 66'; Milton Júnior 90'	Stadium: Estádio José do Rego Maciel (Arruda); Attendance: 45,109; Referee: Ricardo Tavares

22 February 2012 11	Petrolina	2–1	Santa Cruz	Petrolina
20:00 (UTC-3)	Souza 2'; Anderson 47'		Carlinhos Bala 43'	Stadium: Estádio Paulo de Souza Coelho; Attendance: 4,785; Referee: Carlos Costa

25 February 2012 12	Santa Cruz	6–0	Petrolina	Recife
18:00 (UTC-3)	Weslley 6'; William Alves 26'; Dênis Marques 33'; Renatinho 57'; Memo 62'; Flávio Caça-Rato 80'			Stadium: Estádio José do Rego Maciel (Arruda); Attendance: 10,193; Referee: Gleydson Leite

29 February 2012 13	Ypiranga–PE	1–0	Santa Cruz	Santa Cruz do Capibaribe
21:50 (UTC-3)	Danilo Lins 71'			Stadium: Estádio Otávio Limeira Alves; Attendance: 4,802; Referee: Sebastião Rufino Filho

4 March 2012 14	Santa Cruz	2–0	Serra Talhada	Recife
16:00 (UTC-3)	Dênis Marques 39'; Geílson 62'			Stadium: Estádio José do Rego Maciel (Arruda); Attendance: 16,292; Referee: Gilberto Castro Júnior

11 March 2012 15	Santa Cruz	2–0	Salgueiro	Recife
16:00 (UTC-3)	Léo Bartholo 39'; Dutra 90+2'			Stadium: Estádio José do Rego Maciel (Arruda); Attendance: 28,024; Referee: Neilson Santos

18 March 2012 16	Central	1–2	Santa Cruz	Caruaru
16:00 (UTC-3)	Viola 54'		Luciano Henrique 73'; Luciano Henrique 80'	Stadium: Estádio Luiz José de Lacerda (Lacerdão); Attendance: 9,418; Referee: Gilberto Castro Júnior

21 March 2012 17	Belo Jardim	0–3	Santa Cruz	Belo Jardim
21:50 (UTC-3)			Dênis Marques 34' (pen.); Luciano Henrique 36', 42'	Stadium: Estádio José Bezerra de Mendonça; Attendance: 4,749; Referee: Sandro Meira Ricci

24 March 2012 18	Santa Cruz	3–2	Araripina	Recife
19:00 (UTC-3)	Dênis Marques 51' (pen.); William Alves 59'; Carlinhos Bala 83'		Vanderlei 9'; Gideon 90+1'	Stadium: Estádio José do Rego Maciel (Arruda); Attendance: 21,685; Referee: Nielson Nogueira Dias

28 March 2012 19	Porto	1–3	Santa Cruz	Caruaru
21:50 (UTC-3)	Joelson 57'		Dênis Marques 41' (pen.); Chicão 71'; Flávio Caça-Rato 85'	Stadium: Estádio Luiz José de Lacerda (Lacerdão); Attendance: 5,635; Referee: Carlos Costa

1 April 2012 20	Santa Cruz	1–0	Náutico	Recife
16:00 (UTC-3)	Renatinho 64'			Stadium: Estádio José do Rego Maciel (Arruda); Attendance: 27,078; Referee: Sebastião Rufino Filho

8 April 2012 21	Santa Cruz	5–0	América–PE	Recife
16:00 (UTC-3)	Dênis Marques 15', 48', 74' (pen.); Geílson 32'; Luciano Henrique 86'			Stadium: Estádio José do Rego Maciel (Arruda); Attendance: 18,690; Referee: Ricardo Tavares

15 April 2012 22	Sport	2–1	Santa Cruz	Recife
19:00 (UTC-3)	Bruno Aguiar 37', 51'	Report	Flávio Caça-Rato 62'	Stadium: Estádio Adelmar da Costa Carvalho (Ilha do Retiro); Attendance: 20,008; Referee: Neilson Santos

==== Semi-finals ====
22 April 2012	Salgueiro	2–1	Santa Cruz	Salgueiro
16:00 (UTC-3)	Marcos Tamandaré 77'; Edmar 87'		Branquinho 70'	Stadium: Estádio Cornélio de Barros; Attendance: 8,740; Referee: Nielson Nogueira Dias

30 April 2012	Santa Cruz	3–1	Salgueiro	Recife
20:30 (UTC-3)	Natan 32'; Dênis Marques 47' (pen.), 90+1'		Elvis 35'	Stadium: Estádio José do Rego Maciel (Arruda); Attendance: 36,113; Referee: Sebastião Rufino Filho

==== Finals ====
6 May 2012	Santa Cruz	0–0	Sport	Recife
16:00 (UTC-3)		Report		Stadium: Estádio José do Rego Maciel (Arruda); Referee: Neílson Santos

13 May 2012	Sport	2–3	Santa Cruz	Recife
16:00 (UTC-3)	Moacir 13'; Edcarlos 80'	Report	Branquinho 12'; Dênis Marques 40'; Luciano Henrique 74'	Stadium: Estádio Adelmar da Costa Carvalho (Ilha do Retiro); Attendance: 31,998; Referee: Sandro Meira Ricci

==== Record ====
Final Position	Points	Matches	Wins	Draws	Losses	Goals For	Goals Away	Avg%
1st	51	26	16	3	7	51	27	65%

=== Copa do Brasil ===
==== First stage ====
7 March 2012	Penarol	1–2	Santa Cruz	Manaus
22:00 (UTC-4)	Marinelson 58'	Report	Geílson 15', 41'	Stadium: Estádio Roberto Simonsen; Attendance: 1,834; Referee: Raphael Claus

14 March 2012	Santa Cruz	2–3 (a.)	Penarol	Recife
20:30 (UTC-3)	Dênis Marques 15'; Memo 74'	Report	Marinelson 8'; Fábio Bala 72'; Rondinelli 82'	Stadium: Estádio José do Rego Maciel (Arruda); Attendance: 11,677; Referee: Italo Medeiros de Azevedo

==== Record ====
Final Position	Points	Matches	Wins	Draws	Losses	Goals For	Goals Away	Avg%
33rd	3	2	1	0	1	4	4	50%

=== Série C ===
==== First stage ====
1 July 2012 1	Santa Cruz	1–1	Guarany	Recife
16:00 (UTC-3)	Fabrício Ceará 14'	Report	Alex Paraíba 26'	Stadium: Estádio José do Rego Maciel (Arruda); Attendance: 26,357; Referee: Suelson D França Medeiros

8 July 2012 2	Salgueiro	2–2	Santa Cruz	Salgueiro
16:00 (UTC-3)	Pery 5'; Clébson 44'	Report	Luciano Henrique 59'; Dênis Marques 74'	Stadium: Estádio Cornélio de Barros; Attendance: 8,952; Referee: Emerson Luiz Sobral

14 July 2012 3	Santa Cruz	2–1	Treze	Recife
16:00 (UTC-3)	William Alves 14'; Dênis Marques 45+1'	Report	Brasão 71'	Stadium: Estádio José do Rego Maciel (Arruda); Attendance: 20,342; Referee: Rogério Lima da Rocha

20 July 2012 4	Santa Cruz	3–3	Paysandu	Recife
19:00 (UTC-3)	Fabrício Ceará 20'; Dênis Marques 84', 90'	Report	Fábio Sanches 18'; Tiago Potiguar 53'; Régis 77'	Stadium: Estádio José do Rego Maciel (Arruda); Attendance: 24,360; Referee: Pablo dos Santos Alves

29 July 2012 5	Cuiabá	0–0	Santa Cruz	Cuiabá
16:00 (UTC-3)		Report		Stadium: Estádio Eurico Gaspar Dutra; Attendance: 437; Referee: João Lupato

4 August 2012 6	Santa Cruz	4–0	Icasa	Recife
16:00 (UTC-3)	Fabrício Ceará 20'; Édson Borges 35'; Dênis Marques 56' (pen.); Flávio Caça-Rato 88'	Report		Stadium: Estádio José do Rego Maciel (Arruda); Attendance: 24,824; Referee: Charles Hebert Cavalcante Ferreira

12 August 2012 7	Fortaleza	2–0	Santa Cruz	Fortaleza
16:00 (UTC-3)	Rafinha 58'; Valdeson 66'	Report		Stadium: Estádio Presidente Vargas; Attendance: 18,123; Referee: Paulo César de Oliveira

19 August 2012 8	Luverdense	2–1	Santa Cruz	Lucas do Rio Verde
16:00 (UTC-3)	Rubinho 20', 85' (pen.)	Report	Weslley 37'	Stadium: Estádio Municipal Passo das Emas); Attendance: 2,208; Referee: Wilton Pereira Sampaio

25 August 2012 9	Santa Cruz	6–1	Águia de Marabá	Recife
16:00 (UTC-3)	Everton Sena 8'; Fabrício Ceará 18'; Dênis Marques 47', 86'; Leandro Oliveira 64'; Leozinho 76'	Report	Juliano 9'	Stadium: Estádio José do Rego Maciel (Arruda); Attendance: 23,387; Referee: Jailson Macedo Freitas

2 September 2012 10	Guarany de Sobral	1–1	Santa Cruz	Sobral
16:30 (UTC-3)	Marcinho 60'	Report	Dênis Marques 63'	Stadium: Estádio Municipal Plácido Aderaldo Castelo (Junco); Attendance: 1,149; Referee: Leandro Saraiva Dantas de Oliveira

13 September 2012 11	Santa Cruz	0–0	Salgueiro	Recife
20:30 (UTC-3)		Report		Stadium: Estádio José do Rego Maciel (Arruda); Attendance: 28,260; Referee: Emerson Luiz Sobral

16 September 2012 12	Treze	2–1	Santa Cruz	Campina Grande
16:00 (UTC-3)	Assis 33'; Vavá 45+1'	Report	Luciano Henrique 53'	Stadium: Estádio Governador Ernani Sátyro (Amigão); Attendance: 12,924; Referee: Manoel Nunes Lopo Garrido

22 September 2012 13	Paysandu	0–0	Santa Cruz	Belém
16:00 (UTC-3)		Report		Stadium: Estádio Olímpico do Pará (Mangueirão); Attendance: 5,003; Referee: Paulo H Schleich Vollkopf

30 September 2012 14	Santa Cruz	1–0	Cuiabá	Recife
16:00 (UTC-3)	Dênis Marques 71'	Report		Stadium: Estádio José do Rego Maciel (Arruda); Attendance: 35,564; Referee: Edmar Campos da Encarnação

6 October 2012 15	Icasa	3–1	Santa Cruz	Iguatu
16:00 (UTC-3)	Canga 5'; Gilbertto 66'; Niel 71'	Report	Leozinho 55'	Stadium: Estádio Agenor Gomes de Araújo; Attendance: 982; Referee: Elmo Alves Resende Cunha

13 October 2012 16	Santa Cruz	1–2	Fortaleza	Recife
16:00 (UTC-3)	Esley 20' (o.g.)	Report	Careca 53'; Assisinho 68'	Stadium: Estádio José do Rego Maciel (Arruda); Attendance: 25,306; Referee: Paulo H Godoy Bezerra

20 October 2012 17	Santa Cruz	2–1	Luverdense	Recife
16:00 (UTC-3)	Dênis Marques 15', 90+3' (pen.)	Report	Valdir Papel 89'	Stadium: Estádio José do Rego Maciel (Arruda); Attendance: 23,828; Referee: Wagner do Nascimento Magalhães

28 October 2012 18	Águia de Marabá	1–0	Santa Cruz	Marabá
18:00 (UTC-3)	Wando 80'	Report		Stadium: Estádio Municipal Zinho de Oliveira; Attendance: 1,143; Referee: Guilherme Ceretta de Lima

==== Record ====
Final Position	Points	Matches	Wins	Draws	Losses	Goals For	Goals Away	Avg%
14th	22	18	5	7	6	26	22	40%
