= 2011 Santa Cruz Futebol Clube season =

Santa Cruz
2011 season
- Chairman: Antônio Luiz Neto
- Manager: Zé Teodoro
- Stadium: Estádio do Arruda
- Série D: Runners up
- Pernambucano: Champions (25th title)
- Copa do Brasil: Second round
- Top goalscorer: League: Fernando Gaúcho (4); All: Gilberto (13)
| Home colours | Away colours | Third colours |

The 2011 season was Santa Cruz's 98th season in the club's history. Santa Cruz competed in the Campeonato Pernambucano, Copa do Brasil and Série D.

== Squad ==
Note: Flags indicate national team as defined under FIFA eligibility rules; some limited exceptions apply. Players may hold more than one non-FIFA nationality.

| No. | Pos. | Nation | Player |
|---|---|---|---|
| — | GK | BRA | Tiago Cardoso |
| — | GK | BRA | Diego Lima |
| — | DF | BRA | André Oliveira |
| — | DF | BRA | Everton Sena |
| — | DF | BRA | Leandro Bambu |
| — | DF | BRA | Thiago Matias |
| — | DF | BRA | Bruno Leite |
| — | DF | BRA | Alexandre Duarte |
| — | DF | BRA | Johnatan |
| — | DF | BRA | Dutra |
| — | DF | BRA | Hugo |
| — | DF | BRA | Walter |
| — | MF | BRA | Cléber Goiano |
| — | MF | BRA | Helton |

| No. | Pos. | Nation | Player |
|---|---|---|---|
| — | MF | BRA | Chicão |
| — | MF | BRA | Jeovânio |
| — | MF | BRA | Memo |
| — | MF | BRA | Mário Lúcio |
| — | MF | BRA | Natan |
| — | MF | BRA | Renatinho |
| — | MF | BRA | Weslley |
| — | MF | BRA | Têti |
| — | FW | BRA | Thomas Anderson |
| — | FW | BRA | Netto |
| — | FW | BRA | Thiago Cunha |
| — | FW | BRA | Diogo |
| — | FW | BRA | Kiros |
| — | FW | BRA | Flávio Caça-Rato |

== Statistics ==
=== Overall ===
| Games played | 45 (26 Pernambucano, 3 Copa do Brasil, 16 Série D) |
| Games won | 26 (17 Pernambucano, 2 Copa do Brasil, 7 Série D) |
| Games drawn | 9 (3 Pernambucano, 0 Copa do Brasil, 6 Série D) |
| Games lost | 10 (6 Pernambucano, 1 Copa do Brasil, 3 Série D) |
| Goals scored | 66 |
| Goals conceded | 41 |
| Goal difference | +25 |
| Best results (goal difference) | 4–1 (A) v Corintians de Caicó – Copa do Brasil – 2011.02.23 |
| Worst result (goal difference) | 0–3 (H) v Central – Pernambucano – 2011.02.09 |
| Top scorer | Gilberto (13) |

Source: Santa Cruz official website

=== Goalscorers ===
| Place | Position | Nationality | Name | Campeonato Pernambucano | Copa do Brasil | Série D | Total |
|---|---|---|---|---|---|---|---|
| 1 | FW | (Brazil) | Gilberto | 12 | 1 | 0 | 13 |
| 2 | FW | (Brazil) | Thiago Cunha | 6 | 0 | 3 | 9 |
| 2 | DF | (Brazil) | Thiago Matias | 6 | 0 | 3 | 9 |
| 3 | MF | (Brazil) | Weslley | 3 | 0 | 2 | 5 |
| 4 | FW | (Brazil) | Fernando Gaúcho | 0 | 0 | 4 | 4 |
| 4 | MF | (Brazil) | Renatinho | 4 | 0 | 0 | 4 |
| 5 | FW | (Brazil) | Laécio | 3 | 0 | 0 | 3 |
| 6 | MF | (Brazil) | Cleber Goiano | 0 | 2 | 0 | 2 |
| 6 | FW | (Brazil) | Kiros | 0 | 0 | 2 | 2 |
| 6 | FW | (Brazil) | Landu | 2 | 0 | 0 | 2 |
| 6 | DF | (Brazil) | Leandro Souza | 2 | 0 | 0 | 2 |
| 7 | DF | (Brazil) | Alexandre Silva | 0 | 1 | 0 | 1 |
| 7 | MF | (Brazil) | Bismarck | 0 | 0 | 1 | 1 |
| 7 | DF | (Brazil) | Jackson | 1 | 0 | 0 | 1 |
| 7 | MF | (Brazil) | Jefferson Maranhão | 0 | 0 | 1 | 1 |
| 7 | FW | (Brazil) | Ludemar | 0 | 0 | 1 | 1 |
| 7 | MF | (Brazil) | Mário Lúcio | 1 | 0 | 0 | 1 |
| 7 | MF | (Brazil) | Natan | 1 | 0 | 0 | 1 |
| 7 | FW | (Brazil) | Nino Guerreiro | 1 | 0 | 0 | 1 |
| 7 | FW | (Brazil) | Rodrigo Gral | 1 | 0 | 0 | 1 |
| | | | Own goals | 1 | 1 | 0 | 2 |
| | | | Total | 44 | 5 | 17 | 66 |

== Competitions ==
=== Campeonato Pernambucano ===
==== First stage ====
| 13 January 2011 1 | Vitória das Tabocas | 0–3 | Santa Cruz | Vitória de Santo Antão |
| 20:00 (UTC-3) | | | Thiago Matias 2' (pen.); Laécio 50'; Renatinho 71' | Stadium: Estádio Municipal Severino Cândido Carneiro; Attendance: 7,983; Referee: Emerson Sobral |

| 16 January 2011 2 | Santa Cruz | 2–1 | Ypiranga | Recife |
| 16:00 (UTC-3) | Nino Guerreiro 45+2'; Thiago Cunha 51' | | Thiago Matias 64' | Stadium: Estádio José do Rego Maciel (Arruda); Attendance: 22,994; Referee: Nielson Nogueira Dias |

| 18 January 2011 3 | Santa Cruz | 3–1 | América–PE | Recife |
| 20:00 (UTC-3) | Thiago Cunha 20', 29'; Weslley 26' | | Silvano 44' | Stadium: Estádio José do Rego Maciel (Arruda); Attendance: 20.621; Referee: Ricardo Tavares |

| 20 January 2011 4 | Araripina | 0–1 | Santa Cruz | Araripina |
| 20:00 (UTC-3) | | | Thiago Matias 65' | Stadium: Estádio Gilson Tiburtino de Souza (Chapadão do Araripe); Attendance: 5,182; Referee: Carlos Costa |

| 24 January 2011 5 | Salgueiro | 0–1 | Santa Cruz | Salgueiro |
| 20:00 (UTC-3) | | | Thiago Cunha 3' | Stadium: Estádio Cornélio de Barros (Salgueirão); Attendance: 4,448; Referee: Emerson Sobral |

| 27 January 2011 6 | Santa Cruz | 2–1 | Petrolina | Recife |
| 20:00 (UTC-3) | Jackson 12'; Laécio 41' | | Robertinho 27' | Stadium: Estádio José do Rego Maciel (Arruda); Attendance: 25,136; Referee: Antônio Hora Filho |

| 30 January 2011 7 | Náutico | 3–1 | Santa Cruz | Recife |
| 16:00 (UTC-3) | Ricardo Xavier 14'; Derley 70'; Bruno Meneghel 79' (pen.) | | Thiago Cunha 4' | Stadium: Estádio Eládio de Barros Carvalho (Aflitos); Attendance: 18,112; Referee: Nielson Nogueira Dias |

| 3 February 2011 8 | Porto | 3–1 | Santa Cruz | Caruaru |
| 21:00 (UTC-3) | Douglas 4'; Paulista 27'; Thiago Laranjeiras 88' | | Laécio 78' | Stadium: Estádio Luiz José de Lacerda (Lacerdão); Attendance: 7,125; Referee: Neilson Santos |

| 6 February 2011 9 | Santa Cruz | 2–0 | Sport | Recife |
| 16:00 (UTC-3) | Thiago Cunha; Renatinho | | | Stadium: Estádio José do Rego Maciel (Arruda); Attendance: 39,121; Referee: Emerson Sobral |

| 9 February 2011 10 | Santa Cruz | 0–3 | Central | Recife |
| 20:00 (UTC-3) | | | Wilson Surubim 41'; Marcinho 75'; Harley 79' | Stadium: Estádio José do Rego Maciel (Arruda); Attendance: 17,247; Referee: Carlos Costa |

| 13 February 2011 11 | Cabense | 2–2 | Santa Cruz | Cabo de Santo Agostinho |
| 16:00 (UTC-3) | Rosivaldo 34' (pen.); Ricardo Mineiro 36' | | Gilberto 30'; Leandro Souza 80' | Stadium: Estádio Gileno de Carli; Attendance: 4,179; Referee: Emerson Sobral |

| 16 February 2011 12 | Santa Cruz | 3–1 | Cabense | Recife |
| 20:00 (UTC-3) | Gilberto 4' (pen.), 41'; Natan 88' | | Flávio Caça-Rato 26' | Stadium: Estádio José do Rego Maciel (Arruda); Attendance: 13,352; Referee: Gleydson Leite |

| 20 February 2011 13 | Central | 0–1 | Santa Cruz | Caruaru |
| 16:00 (UTC-3) | | | Gilberto 30' (pen.) | Stadium: Estádio Luiz José de Lacerda (Lacerdão); Attendance: 8,683; Referee: Gilberto Castro Júnior |

| 26 February 2011 14 | Santa Cruz | 0–1 | Araripina | Recife |
| 20:30 (UTC-3) | | | Serginho Baiano 61' | Stadium: Estádio José do Rego Maciel (Arruda); Attendance: 14,035; Referee: Gleydson Leite |

| 9 March 2011 15 | Petrolina | 0–3 | Santa Cruz | Petrolina |
| 21:50 (UTC-3) | | | Renatinho 14'; Gilberto 53', 79' | Stadium: Estádio Paulo de Souza Coelho; Attendance: 4,523; Referee: Sebastião Rufino Filho |

| 12 March 2011 16 | Santa Cruz | 2–0 | Salgueiro | Recife |
| 16:00 (UTC-3) | Rodrigo Gral 71'; Wendel 81' (o.g.) | | | Stadium: Estádio José do Rego Maciel (Arruda); Attendance: 12,712; Referee: Cláudio Mercante |

| 20 March 2011 17 | Santa Cruz | 3–3 | Náutico | Recife |
| 16:00 (UTC-3) | Landu 10'; Weslley 12'; Thiago Matias 90' | | Eduardo Ramos 3', 73'; Ricardo Xavier 17' | Stadium: Estádio José do Rego Maciel (Arruda); Attendance: 33,208; Referee: Emerson Sobral |

| 23 March 2011 18 | América–PE | 1–2 | Santa Cruz | Paulista |
| 21:50 (UTC-3) | Flávio Barros 54' | | Gilberto 33' (pen.); Thiago Matias 85' | Stadium: Estádio Ademir Cunha; Attendance: 4,978; Referee: Gleydson Leite |

| 27 March 2011 19 | Santa Cruz | 2–0 | Porto | Recife |
| 16:00 (UTC-3) | Gilberto 32', 46' | | | Stadium: Estádio José do Rego Maciel (Arruda); Attendance: 19,705; Referee: Ricardo Tavares |

| 3 April 2011 20 | Sport | 0–2 | Santa Cruz | Recife |
| 16:00 (UTC-3) | | | Gilberto 77', 83' | Stadium: Estádio Adelmar da Costa Carvalho (Ilha do Retiro); Attendance: 29,015; Referee: Cláudio Mercante |

| 10 April 2011 21 | Santa Cruz | 1–2 | Vitória das Tabocas | Recife |
| 16:00 (UTC-3) | Mário Lúcio 2' | | Aleandro 41'; Bob 87' | Stadium: Estádio José do Rego Maciel (Arruda); Attendance: 12,046; Referee: Sebastião Rufino Filho |

| 17 April 2011 22 | Ypiranga | 0–0 | Santa Cruz | Santa Cruz do Capibaribe |
| 16:00 (UTC-3) | | | | Stadium: Estádio Otávio Limeira Alves; Attendance: 4,364; Referee: Anderson Freitas |

==== Semi-finals ====
| 24 April 2011 | Porto | 1–2 | Santa Cruz | Caruaru |
| 16:00 (UTC-3) | Paulista 60' | | Thiago Matias 1'; Renatinho 3' | Stadium: Estádio Luiz José de Lacerda (Lacerdão); Attendance: 9,353; Referee: Emerson Sobral |

| 30 April 2011 | Santa Cruz | 3–1 | Porto | Recife |
| 16:00 (UTC-3) | Weslley 3'; Leandro Souza 8'; Thiago Matias 14' | | Paulista 24' | Stadium: Estádio José do Rego Maciel (Arruda); Attendance: 32,156; Referee: Emerson Sobral |

==== Finals ====
| 8 May 2011 | Sport | 0–2 | Santa Cruz | Recife |
| 16:00 (UTC-3) | | Report | Gilberto 33'; Landu 64' | Stadium: Estádio Adelmar da Costa Carvalho (Ilha do Retiro); Attendance: 30,169; Referee: Cláudio Mercante Júnior |

| 15 May 2011 | Santa Cruz | 0–1 | Sport | Recife |
| 16:00 (UTC-3) | | Report | Marcelinho Paraíba 90+3' (pen.) | Stadium: Estádio José do Rego Maciel (Arruda); Attendance: 62,243; Referee: Sálvio Spínola Fagundes Filho |

==== Record ====
| Final Position | Points | Matches | Wins | Draws | Losses | Goals For | Goals Away | Avg% |
|---|---|---|---|---|---|---|---|---|
| 1st | 54 | 26 | 17 | 3 | 6 | 44 | 25 | 78% |

=== Copa do Brasil ===
==== First round ====
| 23 February 2011 | Corintians de Caicó | 1–4 | Santa Cruz | Caicó |
| 21:00 (UTC-3) | Júnior Juazeiro 10' | | Alexandre Silva 19'; Cleber Goiano 37', 43'; Gilberto 65' | Stadium: Estádio Senador Dinarte Mariz; Attendance: 676; Referee: Francisco de Assis Almeida Filho |

==== Second round ====
| 30 March 2011 | Santa Cruz | 1–0 | São Paulo | Recife |
| 21:50 (UTC-3) | Rodrigo Souto 34' (o.g.) | Report | | Stadium: Estádio José do Rego Maciel (Arruda); Attendance: 46,681; Referee: Marielson Alves Silva |

| 6 April 2011 | São Paulo | 2–0 | Santa Cruz | Barueri |
| 21:50 (UTC-3) | Rhodolfo 9'; Ilsinho 72' | Report | | Stadium: Arena Barueri; Attendance: 21,430; Referee: Gutemberg de Paula Fonseca |

==== Record ====
| Final Position | Points | Matches | Wins | Draws | Losses | Goals For | Goals Away | Avg% |
|---|---|---|---|---|---|---|---|---|
| 19th | 6 | 3 | 2 | 0 | 1 | 5 | 3 | 66% |

=== Série D ===
==== First stage ====
| 17 July 2011 1 | Alecrim | 1–3 | Santa Cruz | João Pessoa |
| 16:00 (UTC-3) | Jaime 57' | | Weslley 51'; Thiago Matias 66', 84' | Stadium: Estádio José Américo de Almeida Filho (Almeidão); Attendance: 16,022; Referee: Charles Hebert Cavalcante Ferreira |

| 24 July 2011 2 | Santa Cruz | 0–0 | Guarani de Juazeiro | Recife |
| 16:00 (UTC-3) | | | | Stadium: Estádio José do Rego Maciel (Arruda); Attendance: 42,584; Referee: Cosme Iran Sabino Araújo |

| 31 July 2011 3 | Porto | 2–2 | Santa Cruz | Belo Jardim |
| 16:00 (UTC-3) | Evandro 49'; Altemar 90+2' | | Thiago Matias 37'; Kiros 59' | Stadium: Estádio José Bezerra de Mendonça; Attendance: 2,680; Referee: Emerson Sobral |

| 14 August 2011 4 | Santa Cruz | 1–0 | Santa Cruz–RN | Recife |
| 16:00 (UTC-3) | Kiros 3' | | | Stadium: Estádio José do Rego Maciel (Arruda); Attendance: 35,020; Referee: Cláudio Francisco Lima e Silva |

| 28 August 2011 5 | Santa Cruz–RN | 0–0 | Santa Cruz | João Pessoa |
| 17:00 (UTC-3) | | | | Stadium: Estádio José Américo de Almeida Filho (Almeidão); Attendance: 4,129; Referee: Pablo dos Santos Alves |

| 4 September 2011 6 | Santa Cruz | 1–0 | Porto | Recife |
| 16:00 (UTC-3) | Jefferson Maranhão | | | Stadium: Estádio José do Rego Maciel (Arruda); Attendance: 27,746; Referee: Nielson Nogueira Dias |

| 11 September 2011 7 | Guarani de Juazeiro | 2–1 | Santa Cruz | João Pessoa |
| 16:00 (UTC-3) | Tobias 40'; Cristóvão 87' | | Thiago Cunha 1' | Stadium: Estádio José Américo de Almeida Filho (Almeidão); Attendance: 2,175; Referee: Cléber Wellington Abade |

| 18 September 2011 8 | Santa Cruz | 2–1 | Alecrim | Recife |
| 16:00 (UTC-3) | Ludemar 1'; Weslley 52' | | Diego 20' | Stadium: Estádio José do Rego Maciel (Arruda); Attendance: 33,099; Referee: Felipe Duarte Varejão |

==== Round of 16 ====
| 25 September 2011 | Santa Cruz | 1–0 | Coruripe | Recife |
| 16:00 (UTC-3) | Thiago Cunha 30' | | | Stadium: Estádio José do Rego Maciel (Arruda); Attendance: 44,642; Referee: Rodrigo Braghetto |

| 1 October 2011 | Coruripe | 0–0 | Santa Cruz | Coruripe |
| 20:00 (UTC-3) | | | | Stadium: Estádio Gerson Amaral; Attendance: 3,684; Referee: André Luiz de Freitas Castro |

==== Quarter-finals ====
| 9 October 2011 | Treze | 3–3 | Santa Cruz | Campina Grande |
| 16:00 (UTC-3) | Doda 9'; Thiago Cenedesi 22'; Tigrão 58' | | Thiago Cunha 51'; Fernando Gaúcho 62', 79' | Stadium: Estádio Governador Ernani Sátyro (Amigão); Attendance: 11,345; Referee: Sálvio Spínola Fagundes Filho |

| 16 October 2011 | Santa Cruz | 0–0 | Treze | Recife |
| 16:00 (UTC-3) | | | | Stadium: Estádio José do Rego Maciel (Arruda); Attendance: 59,966; Referee: Marcelo de Lima Henrique |

==== Semi-finals ====
| 23 October 2011 | Santa Cruz | 1–0 | Cuiabá | Recife |
| 16:00 (UTC-3) | Bismarck 76' | | | Stadium: Estádio José do Rego Maciel (Arruda); Attendance: 26.867; Referee: Leandro Pedro Vuaden |

| 30 October 2011 | Cuiabá | 1–2 | Santa Cruz | Rondonópolis |
| 16:00 (UTC-3) | Fernando 4' | | Fernando Gaúcho 20', 72' | Stadium: Estádio Engenheiro Luthero Lopes; Attendance: 479; Referee: Luiz Oliveira |

==== Finals ====
| 13 November 2011 | Tupi | 1–0 | Santa Cruz | Juiz de Fora |
| 17:00 (UTC-3) | Ademilson 42' | | | Stadium: Estádio Municipal Radialista Mário Helênio; Attendance: 14,726; Referee: Paulo César de Oliveira |

| 20 November 2011 | Santa Cruz | 0–2 | Tupi | Recife |
| 17:00 (UTC-3) | | | Alan 79'; Henrique 81' | Stadium: Estádio José do Rego Maciel (Arruda); Attendance: 54,815; Referee: Cléber Wellington Abade |

==== Record ====
| Final Position | Points | Matches | Wins | Draws | Losses | Goals For | Goals Away | Avg% |
|---|---|---|---|---|---|---|---|---|
| 2nd | 27 | 16 | 7 | 6 | 3 | 17 | 13 | 56% |
