= 2010 Santa Cruz Futebol Clube season =

Santa Cruz
2010 season
- Chairman: Fernando Bezerra Coelho
- Stadium: Estádio do Arruda
- Série D: Second stage
- Copa do Brasil: Round of 16
- Copa do Nordeste: First stage
- Pernambucano: Semi-finals
- Top goalscorer: League: Joélson (4); All: Joélson (16)
Home colours	Away colours

The 2010 season was Santa Cruz's 97th season in the club's history. Santa Cruz competed in the Campeonato Pernambucano, Copa do Nordeste and Série D., Copa do Brasil and Série D.

== Squad ==
Note: Flags indicate national team as defined under FIFA eligibility rules; some limited exceptions apply. Players may hold more than one non-FIFA nationality.

No.	Pos.	Nation	Player
—	GK	BRA	Tutti
—	GK	BRA	Baggio
—	GK	BRA	Darci
—	GK	BRA	Jaílson
—	DF	BRA	Gilberto Matuto
—	DF	BRA	Baiano
—	DF	BRA	Alysson
—	DF	BRA	Leandro Cardoso
—	DF	BRA	Luiz Eduardo
—	DF	BRA	Alex Xavier
—	DF	BRA	Éverton Senna
—	DF	BRA	Edson Miolo
—	DF	BRA	Jefferson
—	DF	BRA	Marcos Mendes
—	DF	BRA	André Paulino

No.	Pos.	Nation	Player
—	MF	BRA	Cleber Goiano
—	MF	BRA	Léo Bartholo
—	MF	BRA	Wellington
—	MF	BRA	Dedé
—	MF	BRA	Jackson
—	MF	BRA	Natan
—	MF	BRA	Élvis
—	MF	BRA	Serginho
—	MF	BRA	Thiago Laranjeira
—	FW	BRA	Joélson
—	FW	BRA	Brasão
—	FW	BRA	Souza
—	FW	BRA	André Leonel
—	FW	BRA	Gaúcho
—	FW	BRA	Marcelinho

== Statistics ==
=== Overall ===
Games played	52 (24 Pernambucano, 14 Copa do Nordeste, 6 Copa do Brasil, 8 Série D)
Games won	23 (12 Pernambucano, 4 Copa do Nordeste, 3 Copa do Brasil, 4 Série D)
Games drawn	13 (5 Pernambucano, 6 Copa do Nordeste, 0 Copa do Brasil, 2 Série D)
Games lost	16 (7 Pernambucano, 4 Copa do Nordeste, 3 Copa do Brasil, 2 Série D)
Goals scored	81
Goals conceded	63
Goal difference	+18
Best results (goal difference)	6–1 (H) v Sete de Setembro – Pernambucano – 2010.02.27; 6–1 (H) v CSA – Copa do Nordeste – 2010.06.24
Worst result (goal difference)	1–4 (A) v Bahia – Copa do Nordeste – 2010.10.05
Top scorer	Joélson (16)

Source: Santa Cruz official website

=== Goalscorers ===
Place	Position	Nationality	Name	Campeonato Pernambucano	Copa do Nordeste	Copa do Brasil	Série D	Total
1	FW	(Brazil)	Joélson	12	0	0	4	16
2	FW	(Brazil)	Brasão	5	6	2	2	15
3	MF	(Brazil)	Élvis	7	1	3	1	12
4	DF	(Brazil)	Leandro Cardoso	4	2	0	0	6
5	MF	(Brazil)	Jackson	2	2	0	1	5
5	FW	(Brazil)	Souza	2	2	1	0	5
6	DF	(Brazil)	Allyson	1	0	0	2	3
6	FW	(Brazil)	André Leonel	3	0	0	0	3
6	DF	(Brazil)	Gilberto Matuto	2	0	1	0	3
7	FW	(Brazil)	Gilberto	0	2	0	0	2
7	MF	(Brazil)	Léo Bartholo	0	1	1	0	2
7	MF	(Brazil)	Victor Hugo	0	2	0	0	2
8	MF	(Brazil)	Dedé	1	0	0	0	1
8	DF	(Brazil)	Edson Miolo	1	0	0	0	1
8	MF	(Brazil)	Evandro	0	1	0	0	1
8	DF	(Brazil)	Marcos Mendes	1	0	0	0	1
8	DF	(Brazil)	Menezes	0	1	0	0	1
8	DF	(Brazil)	Paulo Cezar	0	1	0	0	1
			Own goals	1	0	0	0	1
			Total	42	21	8	10	81

== Competitions ==
=== Campeonato Pernambucano ===
13 January 2010 1	Sete de Setembro	1–2	Santa Cruz	Garanhuns
20:30 (UTC-3)	Laércio 27'		Joelson 34'; André Leonel 59'	Stadium: Estádio Marco Antônio Maciel (Gigante do Agreste); Attendance: 5,275; Referee: Antônio André

17 January 2010 2	Santa Cruz	1–1	Central	Recife
16:00 (UTC-3)	Joelson 49'		Geraílton 25'	Stadium: Estádio José do Rego Maciel (Arruda); Attendance: 21,751; Referee: Cláudio Mercante

20 January 2010 3	Cabense	0–2	Santa Cruz	Cabo de Santo Agostinho
21:00 (UTC-3)			Joelson 76', 89'	Stadium: Estádio Gileno de Carli; Attendance: 4,264; Referee: Emerson Sobral

23 January 2010 4	Santa Cruz	2–1	Vera Cruz	Recife
16:00 (UTC-3)	Joelson 51'; Jackson 66'		Alcimar 69' (pen.)	Stadium: Estádio José do Rego Maciel (Arruda); Attendance: 17,260; Referee: Ricardo Tavares

27 January 2010 5	Náutico	2–1	Santa Cruz	Recife
20:30 (UTC-3)	Dinda 44'; Itamar 78'		Joelson 57'	Stadium: Estádio Eládio de Barros Carvalho (Aflitos); Attendance: 15,044; Referee: Cláudio Mercante

31 January 2010 6	Porto	3–1	Santa Cruz	Caruaru
16:00 (UTC-3)	Arlindo 18'; Fabian 19', 26'		Élvis 87' (pen.)	Stadium: Estádio Luiz José de Lacerda (Lacerdão); Attendance: 4,822; Referee: Carlos Costa

3 February 2010 7	Santa Cruz	1–3	Sport	Recife
20:30 (UTC-3)	Joelson 90+1'		Ciro 38', 71'; Eduardo Ramos 52'	Stadium: Estádio José do Rego Maciel (Arruda); Attendance: 41,189; Referee: Emerson Sobral

7 February 2010 8	Santa Cruz	1–1	Ypiranga	Recife
16:00 (UTC-3)	Élvis 75'		Ila 1'	Stadium: Estádio José do Rego Maciel (Arruda); Attendance: 8,996; Referee: Gleydson Leite

10 February 2010 9	Vitória das Tabocas	2–1	Santa Cruz	Vitória de Santo Antão
20:30 (UTC-3)	Jadílson 45+1'; Eduardinho 56'		André Leonel 52'	Stadium: Estádio Municipal Severino Cândido Carneiro; Attendance: 4,414; Referee: Antônio André

18 February 2010 10	Santa Cruz	2–0	Araripina	Recife
20:30 (UTC-3)	Fernandes 15' (o.g.); Allyson 25'			Stadium: Estádio José do Rego Maciel (Arruda); Attendance: 8,412; Referee: Nielson Nogueira Dias

21 February 2010 11	Salgueiro	1–2	Santa Cruz	Salgueiro
17:00 (UTC-3)	Siderval 6'		Joelson 25'; Leandro Cardoso 36'	Stadium: Estádio Cornélio de Barros (Salgueirão); Attendance: 4,508; Referee: Emerson Batista

27 February 2010 12	Santa Cruz	6–1	Sete de Setembro	Recife
16:00 (UTC-3)	Élvis 4', 34'; Souza 16', 77'; Leandro Cardoso 39'; Brasão 79'		Leonardo 41'	Stadium: Estádio José do Rego Maciel (Arruda); Attendance: 16,223; Referee: Nielson Nogueira Dias

3 March 2010 13	Central	1–0	Santa Cruz	Caruaru
21:50 (UTC-3)	Rodrigo Mucarbel 68' (pen.)			Stadium: Estádio Luiz José de Lacerda (Lacerdão); Attendance: 7,519; Referee: Ricardo Tavares

7 March 2010 14	Santa Cruz	1–0	Cabense	Recife
16:00 (UTC-3)	Brasão 63' (pen.)			Stadium: Estádio José do Rego Maciel (Arruda); Attendance: 17,839; Referee: Emerson Sobral

14 March 2010 15	Vera Cruz	1–4	Santa Cruz	Vitória de Santo Antão
16:00 (UTC-3)	Luís Carlos 31'		Leandro Cardoso 9', 56'; Gilberto Matuto 45'; Joelson 74' (pen.)	Stadium: Estádio Municipal Severino Cândido Carneiro; Attendance: 5,962; Referee: Antônio André

21 March 2010 16	Santa Cruz	4–2	Náutico	Recife
17:00 (UTC-3)	Edson 42'; Brasão 62', 86'; Jackson 90+1'		Igor 84'; Derley 85'	Stadium: Estádio José do Rego Maciel (Arruda); Attendance: 28,756; Referee: Nielson Nogueira Dias

24 March 2010 17	Santa Cruz	3–2	Porto	Recife
21:00 (UTC-3)	Joelson 34'; Élvis 39' (pen.), 88' (pen.)		Kiros 11'; Fabian 18' (pen.)	Stadium: Estádio José do Rego Maciel (Arruda); Attendance: 15,055; Referee: Antônio Hora Filho

28 March 2010 18	Sport	2–0	Santa Cruz	Recife
16:00 (UTC-3)	Ciro 39'; Eduardo Ramos 86' (pen.)			Stadium: Estádio Adelmar da Costa Carvalho (Ilha do Retiro); Attendance: 22,009; Referee: Nielson Nogueira Dias

4 April 2010 19	Ypiranga	0–2	Santa Cruz	Santa Cruz do Capibaribe
17:00 (UTC-3)			Joelson 56'; Gilberto Matuto 71'	Stadium: Estádio Otávio Limeira Alves; Attendance: 5,430; Referee: Gilberto Castro Júnior

7 April 2010 20	Santa Cruz	1–1	Vitória das Tabocas	Recife
21:50 (UTC-3)	Élvis 27'		Bruno Garcia 90+1'	Stadium: Estádio José do Rego Maciel (Arruda); Attendance: 8,901; Referee: Antônio André

11 April 2010 21	Araripina	2–2	Santa Cruz	Araripina
17:00 (UTC-3)	Marcelo Paraíba 80'; Jessuí 84'		André Leonel 57'; Marcos Mendes 87'	Stadium: Estádio Gilson Tiburtino de Souza (Chapadão do Araripe); Attendance: 4,325; Referee: Carlos Costa

17 April 2010 22	Santa Cruz	3–2	Salgueiro	Recife
17:00 (UTC-3)	Joelson 19'; Brasão 39' (pen.); Dedé 72'		Gílson Costa 30'; Caio 47'	Stadium: Estádio José do Rego Maciel (Arruda); Attendance: 6,878; Referee: Gilberto Castro Júnior

==== Semi-finals ====
25 April 2010	Santa Cruz	0–0	Náutico	Recife
16:00 (UTC-3)				Stadium: Estádio José do Rego Maciel (Arruda); Attendance: 24,572; Referee: Wilton Pereira Sampaio

28 April 2010	Náutico	1–0	Santa Cruz	Recife
21:00 (UTC-3)	Carlinhos Bala 68'			Stadium: Estádio Eládio de Barros Carvalho (Aflitos); Attendance: 14,025; Referee: Wilson Luiz Seneme

==== Record ====
Final Position	Points	Matches	Wins	Draws	Losses	Goals For	Goals Away	Avg%
3rd	41	24	12	5	7	42	30	57%

=== Copa do Nordeste ===
==== First stage ====
9 June 2010 1	Fortaleza	2–2	Santa Cruz	Fortaleza
21:00 (UTC-3)	Jonhes 40'; André Turatto 64'		Jackson 29'; Menezes 77'	Stadium: Estádio Governador Plácido Castelo (Castelão); Attendance: 6,457; Referee: Ítalo Medeiros de Azevedo

13 June 2010 2	Santa Cruz	2–2	Fluminense de Feira	Recife
18:00 (UTC-3)	Brasão 30' (pen.), 67'		Sandro 9'; Ribinha 45+2'	Stadium: Estádio José do Rego Maciel (Arruda); Attendance: 1,898; Referee: Antônio Umbelino

19 June 2010 3	Botafogo–PB	1–2	Santa Cruz	João Pessoa
18:00 (UTC-3)	Washington 51'		Brasão 65'; Leandro Cardoso 80'	Stadium: Estádio José Américo de Almeida Filho (Almeidão); Attendance: 938; Referee: José Cleuton de Souza Lima

24 June 2010 4	Santa Cruz	6–1	CSA	Recife
21:15 (UTC-3)	Jackson 4'; Paulo Cezar 13'; Brasão 19' (pen.), 68'; Leandro Cardoso 33'; Gilberto 45+1'		Peixinho 6'	Stadium: Estádio José do Rego Maciel (Arruda); Attendance: 2,214; Referee: Wladyerisson Silva Oliveira

27 June 2010 5	América–RN	0–0	Santa Cruz	Natal
20:15 (UTC-3)				Stadium: Estádio João Cláudio Vasconcelos Machado (Machadão); Attendance: 1,508; Referee: Francisco Carlos do Nascimento

1 July 2010 6	Santa Cruz	1–1	Vitória	Recife
21:00 (UTC-3)	Brasão 31' (pen.)		Schwenck 8'	Stadium: Estádio José do Rego Maciel (Arruda); Attendance: 4,950; Referee: Leandro Saraiva Dantas de Oliveira

4 July 2010 7	Sergipe	1–1	Santa Cruz	Aracaju
16:00 (UTC-3)	Theo 82'		Victor Hugo 6'	Stadium: Estádio Lourival Baptista (Batistão); Attendance: 1,808; Referee: Charles Hebert Cavalcante Ferreira

7 July 2010 8	Santa Cruz	0–1	Ceará	Recife
21:15 (UTC-3)			Washington 75'	Stadium: Estádio José do Rego Maciel (Arruda); Attendance: 1,809; Referee: Marielson Alves Silva

10 July 2010 9	Náutico	1–1	Santa Cruz	Recife
16:00 (UTC-3)	Erivelto 44'		Evandro 45+1'	Stadium: Estádio Eládio de Barros Carvalho (Aflitos); Attendance: 2,238; Referee: Francisco Almeida Filho

28 July 2010 10	Santa Cruz	2–0	Treze	Recife
20:30 (UTC-3)	Souza 58'; Léo Bartholo 65'			Stadium: Estádio José do Rego Maciel (Arruda); Attendance: 2,881; Referee: Reginaldo Gomes da Silva

4 August 2010 11	CRB	3–1	Santa Cruz	Maceió
20:00 (UTC-3)	Luciano Dias 2', 63'; André Silva 45+2'		Souza 36'	Stadium: Estádio Rei Pelé; Attendance: 3,465; Referee: Manoel Nunes Lopo Garrido

19 August 2010 12	Santa Cruz	0–1	ABC	Recife
21:00 (UTC-3)			Tiago Garça 3'	Stadium: Estádio José do Rego Maciel (Arruda); Attendance: 1,019; Referee: Emanuel Diniz de Araújo

16 September 2010 13	Santa Cruz	2–0	Confiança	Recife
20:00 (UTC-3)	Gilberto 16' (pen.); Victor Hugo 53'			Stadium: Estádio José do Rego Maciel (Arruda); Attendance: 395; Referee: Eder Caxias Aleixo

5 October 2010 14	Bahia	4–1	Santa Cruz	Feira de Santana
20:00 (UTC-3)	Maurício 32' (pen.); Lenine 41'; Aleílson 49'; Wellington 54'		Élvis 50'	Stadium: Estádio Municipal Alberto Oliveira (Joia da Princesa); Referee: José Ricardo Vasconcellos Laranjeira

==== Record ====
Final Position	Points	Matches	Wins	Draws	Losses	Goals For	Goals Away	Avg%
8th	18	14	4	6	4	21	18	43%

=== Copa do Brasil ===
==== First round ====
24 February 2010	América–AM	0–1	Santa Cruz	Manaus
21:00 (UTC-4)			Élvis 59'	Stadium: Estádio Vivaldo Lima (Vivaldão); Attendance: 3,645; Referee: Eduardo Tomaz de Aquino Valadão

10 March 2010	Santa Cruz	3–0	América–AM	Recife
21:00 (UTC-3)	Élvis 38', 44'; Brasão 68'			Stadium: Estádio José do Rego Maciel (Arruda); Attendance: 15,128; Referee: Francisco Carlos do Nascimento

==== Second round ====
17 March 2010	Santa Cruz	0–1	Botafogo	Recife
19:30 (UTC-3)			Herrera 46'	Stadium: Estádio José do Rego Maciel (Arruda); Attendance: 32,212; Referee: Paulo César de Oliveira

1 April 2010	Botafogo	2–3	Santa Cruz	Rio de Janeiro
21:30 (UTC-3)	Herrera 20', 85'		Léo Bartholo 7'; Brasão 65'; Souza 89'	Stadium: Estádio Olímpico João Havelange (Engenhão); Attendance: 4,911; Referee: Wilton Pereira Sampaio

==== Round of 16 ====
14 April 2010	Santa Cruz	1–2	Atlético Goianiense	Recife
21:00 (UTC-3)	Gilberto Matuto 13'		Róbston 43', 70'	Stadium: Estádio José do Rego Maciel (Arruda); Attendance: 39,279; Referee: Leandro Pedro Vuaden

22 April 2010	Atlético Goianiense	2–0	Santa Cruz	Goiânia
21:00 (UTC-3)	Róbston 74'; Marcão 90'			Stadium: Estádio do Governo do Estado de Goiás (Serra Dourada); Attendance: 4,805; Referee: Jaílson Macêdo Freitas

==== Record ====
Final Position	Points	Matches	Wins	Draws	Losses	Goals For	Goals Away	Avg%
13th	9	6	3	0	3	8	7	50%

=== Série D ===
==== First stage ====
18 July 2010 1	Santa Cruz	0–1	CSA	Recife
16:00 (UTC-3)			Everlan 86'	Stadium: Estádio José do Rego Maciel (Arruda); Attendance: 19,706; Referee: Jailson Machado Freire

25 July 2010 2	Potiguar de Mossoró	0–1	Santa Cruz	Mossoró
17:00 (UTC-3)			Brasão 84'	Stadium: Estádio Leonardo Nogueira (Nogueirão); Attendance: 1,748; Referee: Wladyerisson Silva Oliveira

1 August 2010 3	Santa Cruz	0–0	Confiança	Recife
16:00 (UTC-3)				Stadium: Estádio José do Rego Maciel (Arruda); Attendance: 26,968; Referee: João Bosco Sátiro da Nobrega

8 August 2010 4	Confiança	1–1	Santa Cruz	Aracaju
16:00 (UTC-3)	Breno 72'		Joelson 20'	Stadium: Estádio Lourival Baptista (Batistão); Attendance: 3,854; Referee: Manoel Nunes Lopo Garrido

15 August 2010 5	Santa Cruz	2–0	Potiguar de Mossoró	Recife
16:00 (UTC-3)	Joelson 67'; Élvis 90' (pen.)			Stadium: Estádio José do Rego Maciel (Arruda); Attendance: 25,564; Referee: Gleidson Santos Oliveira

22 August 2010 6	CSA	1–2	Santa Cruz	Maceió
16:00 (UTC-3)	Catanha 44'		Joelson 28'; Brasão 90+3' (pen.)	Stadium: Estádio Rei Pelé; Attendance: 13,915; Referee: Arilson Bispo da Anunciação

==== Second stage ====
5 September 2010	Santa Cruz	4–3	Guarany de Sobral	Recife
16:00 (UTC-3)	Joelson 33'; Allyson 36', 42'; Jackson 49'		Leandro Cardoso 18', 24' (o.g.); Danilo Pitbull 62'	Stadium: Estádio José do Rego Maciel (Arruda); Attendance: 50,897; Referee: Cláudio Francisco Lima e Silva

12 September 2010	Guarany de Sobral	2–0	Santa Cruz	Sobral
16:00 (UTC-3)	Danilo Pitbull 19'; Léo Olinda 78'			Stadium: Estádio Municipal Plácido Aderaldo Castelo (Junco); Attendance: 4,756; Referee: Djalma José Beltrami Teixeira

==== Record ====
Final Position	Points	Matches	Wins	Draws	Losses	Goals For	Goals Away	Avg%
14th	14	8	4	2	2	10	8	58%
