= Marcos da Silva =

Marcos da Silva or Marco da Silva may refer to:

== Arts ==
Marco da Silva

- Marco Da Silva (dancer), German-born American dancer and choreographer of Portuguese origin

== Sports ==
Marcos da Silva

- Marcos da Silva (footballer) (born 1986), Brazilian football striker
- Marcos Antônio da Silva Gonçalves (born 1987), a.k.a. Marquinhos, Brazilian footballer
- Marcos Antônio Senna da Silva (born 1976), a.k.a. Marcos Senna or just Senna, Brazil-born Spanish professional footballer
- Marcos Arouca da Silva (born 1986), a.k.a. Arouca, Brazilian footballer
- Marcos Aurélio Fernandes da Silva (born 1977), Brazilian footballer
- Marcos Paulo Segobe da Silva (born 1980), a.k.a. Careca, Brazilian footballer
- Marcos Roberto da Silva Barbosa (born 1982), a.k.a. Marquinhos, Brazilian footballer
- Marcos Roberto Nascimento da Silva (born 1981), a.k.a. Marcos Tamandaré, Brazilian footballer
- Alfredo Marcos da Silva Junior, known as Marcão (born 1986), Brazilian footballer
- Antônio Marcos da Silva (born 1977), a.k.a. Marquinhos Paraná or just Marquinhos, Brazilian footballer

Marco da Silva

- Marco da Silva (French footballer), French footballer
- Marco da Silva (Swedish footballer) (born 1982), former Swedish footballer

Marco Silva

- Marco Silva, Portuguese football player and manager
