= Mauro Fernandes =

Brazilian footballer

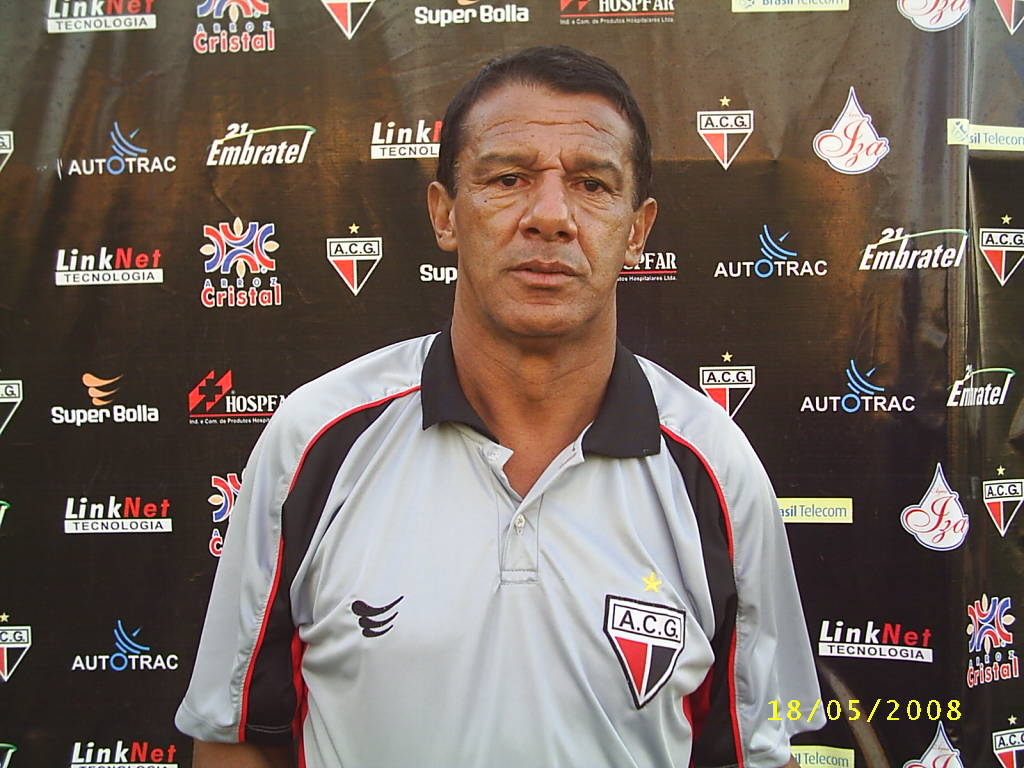

Personal information
- Full name: Mauro Fernandes da Silva
- Date of birth: 3 August 1953 (age 73)
- Place of birth: Sete Lagoas, Brazil
- Position: Forward

Senior career*
Years	Team	Apps	(Gls)
1970–1974	Corinthians		
1974–1975	CSA		
1979–1980	Campinense		

Managerial career
- 1984–1985: Auto Esporte
- 1986–1989: Botafogo-PB
- 1990: ABC
- 1991–1992: CSA
- 1993–1994: Sergipe
- 1995: Náutico
- 1996–1997: Goiás
- 1997: Atlético Goianiense
- 1997: Náutico
- 1998: Sport
- 1999: Coritiba
- 1999: Botafogo
- 2000: Náutico
- 2000: Gama
- 2001: Matonense
- 2001: ABC
- 2001–2002: Sport
- 2002: CRB
- 2002–2003: América Mineiro
- 2003: Londrina
- 2004: Brasiliense
- 2004: Fortaleza
- 2004: Ceilândia
- 2004–2005: Gama
- 2006: Bahia
- 2006–2007: Vitória
- 2007: Ceilândia
- 2007–2008: Santa Cruz
- 2008–2009: Atlético Goianiense
- 2009: Vitória
- 2009: Atlético Goianiense
- 2009–2010: Brasiliense
- 2010–2011: América Mineiro
- 2011: Criciúma
- 2012: Villa Nova
- 2012: Grêmio Barueri
- 2012: América Mineiro
- 2013: Rio Verde
- 2017: Treze
- 2017: Portuguesa
- 2018: Central de Caruaru
- 2019: Caldense
- 2020: Brasiliense
- 2020: Botafogo-PB
- * Club domestic league appearances and goals

Mauro Fernandes da Silva (born 3 August 1953), known as Mauro Fernandes, is a Brazilian retired footballer who played as a forward, and is a current manager.

== Career ==
Born in Sete Lagoas, Minas Gerais, Mauro Fernandes started his career with Corinthians in 1970. After representing other clubs in the São Paulo state, he moved to Mexico and Greece before returning and finishing his playing career with CSA, Treze and Campinense.

Mauro Fernandes started his managerial career in 1984, with Auto Esporte. In 1986 he moved to Série A club Botafogo-PB, winning two Campeonato Paraibano titles during his tenure.

Mauro Fernandes subsequently managed ABC (two stints), CSA, Sergipe, Náutico (three stints), Goiás, Atlético Goianiense (three stints), Sport (two stints), Coritiba, Botafogo, Gama (two stints), Matonense, América Mineiro (three stints), CRB, Londrina, Brasiliense (two stints), Fortaleza, Ceilândia (two stints), Bahia, Vitória (two stints), Santa Cruz, Criciúma, Villa Nova, Grêmio Barueri and Rio Verde before deciding to retire from football. On 3 December 2014, however, he stepped down from retirement to take over Caldas Novas Atlético Clube, but his reign only lasted three months.

On 21 February 2017, after nearly two years without a club, Mauro Fernandes was named manager of Treze. On 30 May, he replaced Estevam Soares at Portuguesa.

== Honours ==
=== Manager ===
Botafogo-PB

- Campeonato Paraibano: 1986, 1988

ABC

- Campeonato Potiguar: 1990

CSA

- Campeonato Alagoano: 1991

Sergipe

- Campeonato Sergipano: 1993, 1994, 1995

Goiás

- Campeonato Goiano: 1996, 1997

Sport

- Campeonato Pernambucano: 1998

Brasiliense

- Campeonato Brasiliense: 2004

Atlético Goianiense

- Campeonato Brasileiro Série C: 2008
