= Landu =

Landu may refer to:

== People ==
- Landú Mavanga (born 1990), Angolan football goalkeeper
- Landu (Brazilian footballer), Brazilian former forward Landoaldo Gomes dos Santos (born 1978)
- Chardi Landu (born 2000), Dutch footballer
- Christian Landu Landu (born 1992), Norwegian footballer

== Other uses ==
- Landu, a village on Rote Island, Indonesia
- Landu, a dialect of the Ringgou language, spoken on Rote Island
