= Wesley Santos =

Brazilian footballer

Personal information
- Full name: Wesley Tavares dos Santos
- Date of birth: 21 January 1991 (age 35)
- Place of birth: São Vicente, Brazil
- Height: 1.71 m (5 ft 7 in)
- Position: Left back

Youth career
- Santos

Senior career*
Years	Team	Apps	(Gls)
2010–2011	Santos	2	(0)
2011	→ Sport Barueri (loan)	6	(1)
2012	→ Rio Verde (loan)	0	(0)
2012	→ Portuguesa Santista (loan)	4	(0)
2013	Jabaquara	8	(0)
2014	Guarany de Sobral	1	(0)
2015	CENE	3	(0)
2016	Jabaquara	9	(0)
2016–2018	Cubillas	37	(13)
Total		70	(14)
- * Club domestic league appearances and goals

Wesley Tavares dos Santos (born 21 January 1991), known as Wesley Santos or simply Wesley, is a Brazilian retired footballer who played as a left back.

== Club career ==
Born in São Vicente, São Paulo, Wesley Santos was a Santos youth graduate. On 14 February 2010, after helping the under-20 side finish runner-up in the Copa São Paulo de Futebol Júnior, he made his debut with the main squad by starting in a 2–1 Campeonato Paulista home win against Rio Claro.

Ahead of the 2011 season, WWesley Santos as loaned to Campeonato Paulista Série A3 side Sport Barueri. After featuring sparingly, he returned to Peixe and made his Série A debut on 17 July of that year, starting in a 2–1 home defeat of Atlético Mineiro.

Wesley Santos failed to make any further appearances for the club, being subsequently loaned to Rio Verde and Portuguesa Santista for the 2012 campaign. On 17 May 2013, he joined Jabaquara after his contract with Santos expired.

Wesley Santos signed for Guarany de Sobral for the 2014 season, but was released on 15 August. He also represented CENE before returning to Jabaquara in 2016.

In June 2016, Wesley Santos agreed to a move to American club Las Vegas City FC, but the move never materialized. In September, he agreed to a deal with FC Cubillas in the Spanish Primera Andaluza.

== Career statistics ==
As of 12 April 2019

Club	Season	League			State League		Cup		Continental		Other		Total	
Club	Season	Division	Apps	Goals	Apps	Goals	Apps	Goals	Apps	Goals	Apps	Goals	Apps	Goals
Santos	2010	Série A	0	0	1	0	0	0	—		—		1	0
Santos	2011	Série A	1	0	—		—		—		—		1	0
Santos	Subtotal		1	0	1	0	0	0	—		—		2	0
Sport Barueri (loan)	2011	Paulista A3	—		6	1	—		—		—		6	1
Rio Verde (loan)	2012	Goiano	—		0	0	—		—		—		0	0
Portuguesa Santista (loan)	2012	Paulista 2ª Divisão	—		4	0	—		—		—		4	0
Jabaquara (loan)	2013	Paulista 2ª Divisão	—		8	0	—		—		—		8	0
Guarany de Sobral	2014	Série D	1	0	0	0	—		—		—		1	0
CENE	2015	Sul-Mato-Grossense	—		3	0	1	0	—		—		4	0
Jabaquara	2016	Paulista 2ª Divisão	—		9	0	—		—		—		9	0
Cubillas	2016–17	Primera Andaluza	30	13	—		—		—		—		30	13
Cubillas	2017–18	Primera Andaluza	7	0	—		—		—		—		7	0
Cubillas	Subtotal		37	13	—		—		—		—		37	13
Career total			39	13	31	1	1	0	0	0	0	0	71	14
