= Jhonata =

Jhonata is a given name. It may refer to:

- Jhonata (footballer) (born 1992), Jhonata de Lima Ferreira, Brazilian football defensive midfielder
- Jhonata Varela (born 2000), Brazilian football defensive midfielder

== See also ==
- Jonathan (disambiguation)
