= Teti (disambiguation) =

Teti may refer to:

== People ==
- Teti, first king of the Sixth Dynasty of Egypt
- Sekhemkhet, second king of the Third Dynasty of Egypt, whose nomen was Teti
- Hor-Aha, second king of the First Dynasty of Egypt, whose nomen was Teti
- Teti (vizier), ancient Egyptian vizier
- Teti, Son of Minhotep, ancient Egyptian official
- Têti (born 1979), Brazilian footballer

== Other ==
- Teti, Sardinia, comune in Italy
