= Weslley (footballer, born 1982) =

Brazilian footballer

Personal information
- Full name: Weslley Morais Sousa
- Date of birth: June 7, 1982 (age 44)
- Place of birth: Inhuma, Piauí, Brazil
- Height: 1.72 m (5 ft 8 in)
- Position: Midfielder

Team information
- Current team: Rio Verde

Youth career
- 2001–2000: Gama

Senior career*
Years	Team	Apps	(Gls)
2000–2001	Gama	?	(?)
2002–2003	Brasiliense	?	(?)
2005–2010	Atlético Goianiense	27	(2)
2007–2008	→ Al Wasl FC (loan)	?	(?)
2010	→ América Mineiro (loan)	11	(0)
2011–2012	Santa Cruz	44	(8)
2013	Guarani		
2013–	Rio Verde		
- * Club domestic league appearances and goals

Weslley Morais Sousa or simply Weslley (born June 7, 1982 in Inhuma, Piauí), is a Brazilian midfielder. He currently plays for Rio Verde.

== Honours ==
=== Club ===
- Gama
  - Brasília State League: 2001
- Brasiliense
  - Campeonato Brasileiro Série C: 2002
- Atlético Goianiense
  - Goiás State League: 2007, 2010
  - Campeonato Brasileiro Série C: 2008
- Santa Cruz
  - Pernambuco State League: 2011
