= Allyson (footballer, born 1982) =

Brazilian footballer

Personal information
- Full name: Allyson Araújo Santos
- Date of birth: 28 January 1982 (age 44)
- Place of birth: Aracaju, Brazil
- Height: 1.86 m (6 ft 1 in)
- Position: Centre-back

Senior career*
Years	Team	Apps	(Gls)
2004	Coritiba (SE)		
2005	Bahia	9	(0)
2005–2006	Çaykur Rizespor	13	(1)
2007	Náutico	10	(0)
2007	Denizlispor	15	(0)
2008–2009	Manisaspor	14	(0)
2009	→ Juventude (loan)	12	(1)
2010	Santa Cruz	0	(0)
2010	Fortaleza	1	(0)
2011	Cabofriense	3	(0)
2011	Bahia de Feira	8	(1)
2011–2012	Penafiel	29	(7)
2012–2013	Ethnikos Achna	8	(0)
2013	Sobradinho Esporte Clube		(1)
2014	Central	19	(1)
2015	Marcílio Dias	12	(0)
2016–2017	Jacobinense Esporte Clube	15	(0)
2019	Atlético de Alagoinhas	6	(0)
- * Club domestic league appearances and goals

Allyson Araújo Santos (born 28 January 1982), known as just Allyson, is a Brazilian former professional footballer who played as a centre-back.

== Career ==
Born in Aracaju, Sergipe, Allyson played for Bahia at 2005 Campeonato Baiano, 2005 Copa do Brasil and 2005 Campeonato Brasileiro Série B before moved abroad. He is best fast shooter (127.7 km/h).

=== Turkey ===
Allyson signed a three-year contract with Çaykur Rizespor in August 2005. He played 13 matches in the first season and released in October 2006.

In January 2007 he signed a one-year deal with Náutico of Recife. He played for the team at 2007 Campeonato Pernambucano, 2007 Copa do Brasil and 2007 Campeonato Brasileiro Série A.

In July 2007, he returned to Turkey for Denizlispor, and in January 2008 left for Manisaspor.

=== Return to Brazil ===
In March 2009 signed a contract until November for Esporte Clube Juventude. In January 2010, Allyson mutually terminated his contract with Manisaspor, which due to expire in June 2010, and signed a contract with Santa Cruz until the end of 2010 Campeonato Pernambucano.

In August 2010 he left for Fortaleza of 2010 Campeonato Brasileiro Série C.
