= Brasão =

Brazilian footballer (1982–2026)

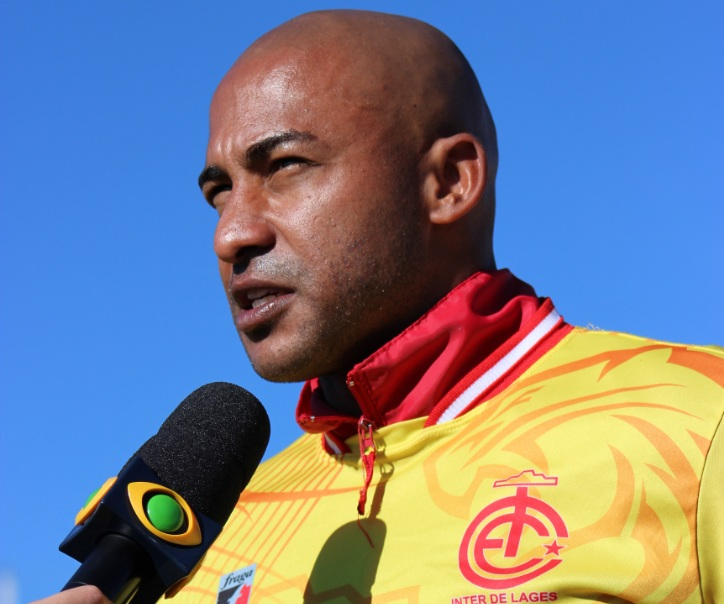
- Brasão in 2014

Personal information
- Full name: Ivan Fiel da Silva
- Date of birth: 1 January 1982
- Place of birth: São Paulo, Brazil
- Date of death: 19 June 2026 (aged 44)
- Place of death: Tubarão, Santa Catarina, Brazil
- Height: 1.80 m (5 ft 11 in)
- Position: Forward

Youth career
- 2002–2003: Flamengo-SP

Senior career*
Years	Team	Apps	(Gls)
2002–2003	Flamengo-SP		
2003	União Mogi		
2003–2006	Fransa-Pax		
2007	Navegantes		
2007	Guarani-SC		
2008	Camboriuense		
2008–2009	Salgaocar		
2009	Fluminense de Feira		
2009	Atlético Goianiense		
2009	Atlético Paranaense		
2010	Santa Cruz		
2010–2011	Vitória de Setúbal		
2012	Fluminense de Feira		
2012	Treze		
2013	Santa Cruz-RS		
2013	Brasil de Pelotas		
2013	Inter de Lages		
2014	Atlético de Ibirama		
2014	Inter de Lages		
2014–2015	Vitória da Conquista		
2015	Caldas Novas		
2015	Fluminense de Feira		
2015–2016	Camboriú		
2016	Treze		
2016	Atlético Tubarão		
2017	Pelotas		
2017	Camboriú		
2018	Jacuipense		
2018	Lagarto		
2018	Almirante Barroso		
2019	Concórdia		
2022	Atlético Tubarão		
- * Club domestic league appearances and goals as of 19 August 2025

Ivan Fiel da Silva (1 January 1982 – 19 June 2026), better known as Brasão, was a Brazilian professional footballer who played as a forward.

== Early life ==
Ivan Fiel da Silva was born in São Paulo on 1 January 1982. He received the nickname "Brasão" (English: big ember) in childhood because he was tall and fiery like a coal.

== Career ==
Brasão began his career with AA Flamengo de Guarulhos in 2002. He later played for União Mogi, and at the end of 2003, he transferred to Framsa-Pax in Indian football, an unusual destination for Brazilian players at the time. He played there until April 2006. Upon his return to Brazil, he played for the Santa Catarina state teams Navegantes EC, Guarani de Palhoça, and Camboriuense (now Camboriu). At the end of 2008, he returned to Indian football, this time playing for Salgaocar. In 2009, back in Brazil, he played for the Atlético Goianiense and Athletico Paranaense.

In 2010, Brasão became a trend topic on Brazilian Twitter with Santa Cruz fans due to his great performance in the Campeonato Pernambucano that season. Over the years, he identified with several other teams, such as Brasil de Pelotas and Inter de Lages, teams where he was champion of the second state level and promoted. His last professional club was Atlético Tubarão in 2022, when he was 40 years old.

== Death ==
Brasão was shot and killed alongside another man at a grocery store in the city of Tubarão, Santa Catarina, on the morning of 19 June 2026. He was 44.

== Honours ==
Fluminense de Feira

- Copa Governador do Estado da Bahia: 2009

Santa Cruz

- Copa Pernambuco: 2010

Brasil de Pelotas

- Campeonato Gaúcho Série A2: 2013

Inter de Lages

- Campeonato Catarinense Série B: 2014

Vitória da Conquista

- Copa Governador do Estado da Bahia: 2014
