= Fabrício Ceará =

Brazilian footballer (born 1978)

Personal information
- Full name: Fabrício Carlos Costa Bento
- Date of birth: 2 May 1978 (age 48)
- Place of birth: Limoeiro do Norte, Ceará, Brazil
- Height: 1.82 m (6 ft 0 in)
- Position: Striker

Senior career*
Years	Team	Apps	(Gls)
1998–1999	Bento Gonçalves		
1999–2000	Guarani		
2000–2001	Lajeadense		
2001	Inter de Lages	18	(10)
2001–2002	Vitória de Guimarães		
2002–2004	Santa Clara		
2004–2005	Belenenses	11	(0)
2005	→ Criciúma (loan)		
2006	Paysandu		
2006–2007	Santa Cruz		
2007–2008	Esteghlal Ahvaz	10	(1)
2009	Botafogo-PB		
2010–2011	Ypiranga-PE		
2010–2011	→ Icasa (loan)		
2011–2012	Salgueiro		
2012–2013	→ Santa Cruz (loan)		
2013–2014	Salgueiro		
2015	Treze		
- * Club domestic league appearances and goals

Fabrício Carlos Costa Bento, also known as Fabrício Ceará, or simply Ceará, (born 2 May 1978) is a Brazilian former football striker.
