= Branquinho (footballer, born 1989) =

Brazilian footballer

Personal information
- Full name: Álvaro André Rodrigues da Silva
- Date of birth: November 14, 1989 (age 36)
- Place of birth: Paulista, Brazil
- Height: 1.70 m (5 ft 7 in)
- Position: Striker

Team information
- Current team: Manaus

Senior career*
Years	Team	Apps	(Gls)
2009–2010	Salgueiro	?	(?)
2010–2013	América (PE)	0	(0)
2011	→ Sport Recife (loan)	8	(0)
2012	→ Santa Cruz (loan)	5	(0)
2013	→ Corinthians-AL (loan)	0	(0)
2013	→ Passo Fundo (loan)	0	(0)
2014	Linense	0	(0)
2014	Tarxien Rainbows	15	(5)
2015	Passo Fundo	0	(0)
2015	Caxias do Sul	6	(0)
2015	Ypiranga	9	(0)
2016	Passo Fundo	0	(0)
2016	América (PE)	8	(2)
2017	Novo Hamburgo	0	(0)
2017	São Bento	18	(0)
2018	Novo Hamburgo	6	(0)
2018	São Bento	18	(0)
2019	Brasil de Pelotas	25	(3)
2020	Santo André	14	(4)
2020	Ferroviária	15	(3)
2021	Ituano	19	(2)
2021	Retrô	3	(0)
2022	Villa Nova	12	(2)
2022–	Manaus	3	(0)
- * Club domestic league appearances and goals as of 15:20, 18 June 2019 (UTC)

Álvaro André Rodrigues da Silva (born November 14, 1989, in Paulista), or simply Branquinho, is a Brazilian striker. He currently plays for Manaus.

== Career ==
He began his career in Salgueiro in 2009. Soon after, he moved to the América (PE), where he was part of the group that secured access to the elite division of Campeonato Pernambucano in 2010. He stood out in Campeonato Pernambucano in 2011 and drew the attention of Recife Sport, who hired him on loan to dispute 2011 Campeonato Brasileiro Série B. However, the attacker did not have many chances in the red-black team, and only played 8 games. He signed on loan with Santa Cruz for the 2012 season and played in 2012 Campeonato Brasileiro Série C.

Branquinho was announced as a "major signing" for Corinthians-AL in December 2012. However, by the end of February 2013 he had signed for Passo Fundo to play in Campeonato Gaúcho. He returned to parent club América (PE) to participate in the second division of Campeonato Pernambuco in the second half of 2013, before signing for Linense for 2014 Campeonato Paulista.

In August 2014, Branquinho was one of four Brazilians to sign for Maltese Premier League side Tarxien Rainbows for the 2014–15 season. He didn't see out the season, and in January 2015 he returned to Brazil and to Passo Fundo.

In May 2015, Branquinho was presented by Caxias do Sul as a reinforcement for 2015 Campeonato Brasileiro Série C. After three months, and half a dozen games played, he moved to Ypiranga for their 2015 Campeonato Brasileiro Série D campaign, which ended in promotion.

Branquinho returned to Passo Fundo for a third time in November 2015, in time for the 2016 edition of the Campeonato Gaúcho. By June 2016 he had moved back to América (PE), scoring two goals in his debut in the first game of their 2016 Campeonato Brasileiro Série D season.

In 2017 Branquinho first helped Novo Hamburgo to win Campeonato Gaúcho, then helped São Bento win promotion from 2017 Campeonato Brasileiro Série C. He returned to Novo Hamburgo for the first half of the 2018 season and stayed to represent them in 2018 Campeonato Brasileiro Série D, before joining up with São Bento and scoring in his first home game against Coritiba on 24 July 2018.

In January 2019, Branquinho signed with Brasil de Pelotas.
