= André Paulino =

Brazilian footballer (born 1985)

Personal information
- Full name: André Luiz Paulino de Souza Motta
- Date of birth: 14 March 1985 (age 41)
- Place of birth: Rio de Janeiro, Brazil
- Height: 1.90 m (6 ft 3 in)
- Positions: Defensive midfielder; centre-back

Senior career*
Years	Team	Apps	(Gls)
2004–2009	Madureira		
2007	→ Avaí (loan)		
2008	→ CFZ (loan)		
2009	Volta Redonda		
2009	Nova Iguaçu		
2010	Santa Cruz		
2011	Cabofriense		
2011	Anápolis		
2011	Itumbiara		
2012	Novo Hamburgo		
2012–2015	Chapecoense		
2015–2016	Madureira		
2016	Novo Hamburgo		
2016	Botafogo-PB		
2016	Ceará		
2017	Macaé		
2017	Madureira		
2018	Operário		
2018	7 de Abril		
2019	Operário		
2020	7 de Abril		
- * Club domestic league appearances and goals

André Luiz Paulino de Souza Motta (born 14 March 1985, in Rio de Janeiro), known as André Paulino, is a Brazilian former professional footballer. Mainly a defensive midfielder, he also played as a centre-back.

== Career ==
André Paulino was loaned to Avaí in September 2007 and loaned to CFZ in August 2008.

He played once in 2011 Brazilian fourth division with Itumbiara, in September.
