= Eduardo Arroz =

Brazilian footballer (born 1981)

Personal information
- Full name: Eduardo Rosa dos Santos
- Date of birth: May 4, 1981 (age 45)
- Place of birth: Itaporã, Brazil
- Height: 1.79 m (5 ft 10 in)
- Position: Right back

Team information
- Current team: Operário de Campo Grande

Senior career*
Years	Team	Apps	(Gls)
2002	Ituano		
2003	Atlético Sorocaba		
2005–2007	América de Natal		
2007	Marília		
2008–2011	Ponte Preta		
2011–2012	Santa Cruz		
2012	Mirassol		
2013	Aparecidense		
2013	Guaratinguetá		
2014	Treze		
2015	Aparecidense		
2015	Itaporã		
2016	Sete de Dourados		
2017–	Operário de Campo Grande		
- * Club domestic league appearances and goals

Eduardo Rosa dos Santos or simply Eduardo Arroz (born May 4, 1981), is a Brazilian right back. He currently plays for Sete de Dourados.

== Honours ==
Santa Cruz

- Campeonato Pernambucano: 2011, 2012

Aparecidense

- Campeonato Goiano Série B: 2014

Sete de Dourados

- Campeonato Sul-Mato-Grossense: 2016
