= Élvis (footballer, born 1985) =

Brazilian footballer

- polegar

Personal information
- Full name: Élvis José de Lima
- Date of birth: November 5, 1985 (age 41)
- Place of birth: Camaragibe, Brazil
- Height: 1.73 m (5 ft 8 in)
- Position: Attacking midfielder

Team information
- Current team: Salgueiro

Youth career
- 2000–2004: Santa Cruz

Senior career*
Years	Team	Apps	(Gls)
2005–2010	Santa Cruz	22	(4)
2009	→ Salgueiro (loan)	8	(1)
2009	→ Campinense (loan)	?	(?)
2011	Sport Recife	5	(0)
2011	→ Paysandu (loan)	?	(?)
2011–2012	Salgueiro	20	(1)
2012	ASA	7	(0)
2012–2013	Salgueiro	44	(10)
2014	ABC	5	(0)
2015	Mogi Mirim	8	(0)
2016	Juazeirense		
2017–2019	Salgueiro		
- * Club domestic league appearances and goals

Élvis José de Lima (born November 5, 1985, in Camaragibe), is a Brazilian attacking midfielder. He currently plays for ABC.

== Career ==
Born in Pernambuco state, Élvis began his career with local side Santa Cruz Futebol Clube. After graduating from the club's youth academy, he played for the club until 2010.

Élvis signed with Sport Clube Recife in 2011 on a free after playing with Santa Cruz. Shortly after, he returned to Salgueiro Atlético Clube where he had played on loan from Santa Cruz.

He transferred from Salgueiro to Mogi Mirim in 2015 to reinforce the club after their promotion from Serie C to Serie B. Mogi Mirim knocked out Salgueiro in the Serie C promotion playoffs that year.
