= Fernando Gaúcho =

Brazilian footballer (born 1980)

Personal information
- Full name: Fernando da Silva Jaques
- Date of birth: January 12, 1980 (age 46)
- Place of birth: Porto Alegre-RS, Brazil
- Height: 1.76 m (5 ft 9 1/2 in)
- Position: Striker

Senior career*
Years	Team	Apps	(Gls)
1998–1999	Caxias		
2000	Grêmio		
2001–2005	Ituano		
2002	Paços de Ferreira		
2003	Ituano		
2003–2004	Paraná		
2005	Ituano		
2006	Comercial-SP		
2006	Noroeste		
2007–2008	Adap		
2008	Adap Galo Maringá		
2008–2009	Guarani		
2010	Rio Claro		
2010	Criciúma		
2011	São José		
2011	Caldense		
2011	Campinense		
2011	Santa Cruz		
2012	Comercial-SP		
2012	Guarany de Sobral		
2013	Araxá		
2013	Guarani		
2013	Atibaia		
2014	Avenida		
2015	Anápolis		
2015	Taboão da Serra		
2016	Esportivo		
2016	Serrano da Paraíba		
- * Club domestic league appearances and goals

Fernando da Silva Jaques (born January 12, 1980), known as Fernando Gaúcho, is a Brazilian former footballer who played as a striker. He was Guarani's top goalscorer on the 2008 Campeonato Brasileiro Série C, having scored 17 goals in 21 matches.

== Honours ==
- Campeonato Brasileiro Série C: 2003
- Campeonato Paulista: 2002
- Torneio Ângelo Dosseana: 2001
- Copa Mauro R. de Oliveira: 2002
