= Edson Borges =

Brazilian footballer (born 1985)

Personal information
- Date of birth: January 20, 1985 (age 41)
- Place of birth: Gaspar, Brazil
- Height: 1.91 m (6 ft 3 in)
- Position: Centre-back

Team information
- Current team: Santa Cruz
- Number: 4

Youth career
- 1998–2000: Santos

Senior career*
Years	Team	Apps	(Gls)
2001–2002	Santos		
2002–2004	Comercial-SP		
2004–2007	Iraty		
2007	América-RN		
2007–2008	São Caetano		
2008	Grêmio Barueri		
2009	Iraty		
2009	Villa Nova		
2010	Novo Hamburgo		
2010–2011	Juventude		
2011	Grêmio Barueri		
2012	Itumbiara		
2012–	Santa Cruz		
- * Club domestic league appearances and goals

Edson Borges (born January 20, 1985), is a Brazilian professional footballer who plays as a centre-back for Santa Cruz.
