= Fábio Sanches =

Brazilian footballer (born 1991)

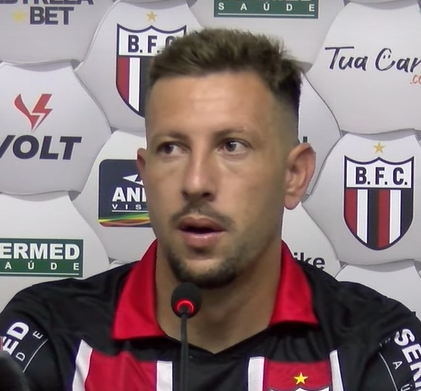
- Fábio Sanches in 2024

Personal information
- Full name: Fábio Pizarro Sanches
- Date of birth: 6 January 1991 (age 35)
- Place of birth: São José dos Campos, Brazil
- Height: 1.86 m (6 ft 1 in)
- Position: Defender

Team information
- Current team: Botafogo-SP
- Number: 27

Senior career*
| Years | Team | Apps | (Gls) |
| 2010–2015 | Mogi Mirim | 92 | (2) |
| 2011 | → América de Natal (loan) | 12 | (0) |
| 2012 | → ASA (loan) | 1 | (0) |
| 2012 | → Paysandu (loan) | 20 | (1) |
| 2013 | → Atlético Sorocaba (loan) | 13 | (3) |
| 2013 | → Paysandu (loan) | 29 | (0) |
| 2016 | XV de Piracicaba | 12 | (0) |
| 2016–2017 | Avaí | 27 | (0) |
| 2017–2021 | Goiás | 104 | (2) |
| 2021–2023 | Ponte Preta | 88 | (1) |
| 2024– | Botafogo-SP | 0 | (0) |
- * Club domestic league appearances and goals as of 23 December 2023

Fábio Pizarro Sanches (born 6 January 1991) is a Brazilian professional footballer who plays as a defender for Botafogo-SP.

== Professional career ==
Sanches made his professional debut with Mogi Mirim in a 5-1 Campeonato Paulista loss to Palmeiras on 16 January 2010.

== Honours ==
Paysandu

- Campeonato Paraense: 2013

Goiás

- Campeonato Goiano: 2017, 2018

Ponte Preta

- Campeonato Paulista Série A2: 2023
