= Jackson (footballer, born 1984) =

Brazilian footballer

Personal information
- Full name: Jackson Jose Lucas
- Date of birth: 2 March 1984 (age 42)
- Place of birth: São Bernardo do Campo, Brazil
- Height: 1.76 m (5 ft 9 in)
- Position: Defender

Youth career
- 2002–2003: Portuguesa

Senior career*
Years	Team	Apps	(Gls)
2004–2007	Portuguesa		
2007	→ Ituano (loan)		
2007–2008	Pandurii Târgu Jiu	4	(0)
2009	Nacional-SP		
2009	Guaratinguetá	8	(0)
2010	São José		
2010	Red Bull Brasil		
2011	Santa Cruz		
2011	Marília	2	(0)
2012	Santo André		
2012	CSA		
2014	Independente de Limeira		
2015	São José		
2015	Pelotas		
- * Club domestic league appearances and goals

Jackson Jose Lucas (born 2 March 1984) is a Brazilian former footballer who played as a defender. His only experience outside Brazil is in the Romanian top division Liga I at Pandurii Târgu Jiu.
