= Inhuma, Piauí =

Coordinates: 6°40′04″S 41°42′28″W

- Municipality
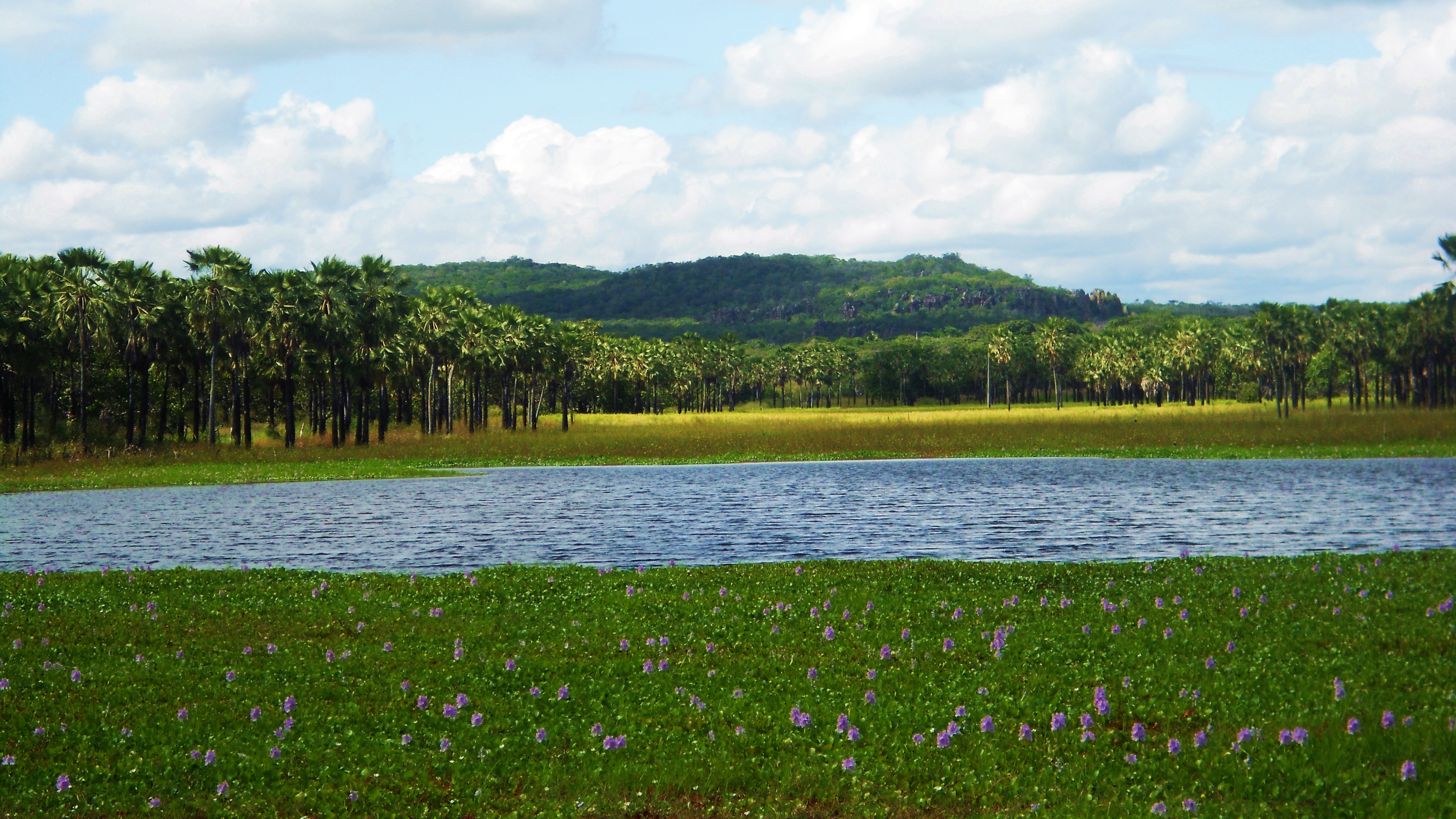

- Country: Brazil
- Region: Nordeste
- State: Piauí
- Mesoregion: Centro-Norte Piauiense

Population (2020)
  - Total: 15,319
- Time zone: UTC−3 (BRT)

Inhuma, Piauí is a municipality in the state of Piauí in the Northeast region of Brazil.

== See also ==
- List of municipalities in Piauí
