= Leandro Oliveira (footballer) =

Brazilian footballer

Personal information
- Full name: Leandro Aparecido Padilha de Oliveira
- Date of birth: January 2, 1988 (age 38)
- Place of birth: Campo Grande, Mato Grosso do Sul, Brazil
- Height: 1.72 m (5 ft 8 in)
- Position: Midfielder

Senior career*
Years	Team	Apps	(Gls)
2009–2010	Corinthians Paranaense		
2011	Ituano	14	(2)
2011	Paraná Clube	7	(0)
2012	Noroeste	22	(10)
2012	→ Santa Cruz (loan)	8	(1)
2013	Comercial		
2013	Guaratinguetá	4	(0)
2013	Al-Faisaly	5	(0)
2014	Comercial	0	(0)
2014	São Caetano	5	(0)
2014	Rio Claro		
2015	Thespakusatsu Gunma	20	(1)
2016	Londrina	0	(0)
2016	Bragantino	3	(0)
2017	Caldense	0	(0)
2017	Comercial MS	4	(2)
2018	Noroeste	0	(0)
2019	Patrocinense	0	(0)
2019	Moto Club	4	(0)
2019–?	Noroeste	0	(0)
- * Club domestic league appearances and goals

Leandro Aparecido Padilha de Oliveira (born January 2, 1988) is a Brazilian former professional footballer who played as a midfielder.
