= Mário Lúcio (footballer) =

Brazilian footballer (born 1989)

Personal information
- Full name: Mário Lúcio da Silva Junior
- Date of birth: December 11, 1989 (age 36)
- Place of birth: Dourados, Mato Grosso do Sul, Brazil
- Height: 1.79 m (5 ft 10 1/2 in)
- Position: Midfielder

Team information
- Current team: NK Istra 1961
- Number: 7

Youth career
- CENE
- 2008–2009: Guarani

Senior career*
Years	Team	Apps	(Gls)
2009–2011	Guarani	31	(1)
2011	→ Santa Cruz (loan)		
2011	Red Bull Brasil		
2012	CENE		
2012	CSE		
2012	Mogi Mirim		
2013	Sobradinho		
2013–2015	Tianjin Songjiang	64	(23)
2016	Sete de Setembro	7	(0)
2016–	NK Istra 1961	24	(1)
- * Club domestic league appearances and goals as of 17 August 2016

Mário Lúcio da Silva Junior (born 11 December 1989), simply Mário Lúcio, is a Brazilian professional football player who currently plays for Croatian First Football League side NK Istra 1961.

Mário Lúcio was signed by China League One side Tianjin Songjiang in July 2013.
