= Victor Hugo (footballer, born 1991) =

Brazilian footballer

Personal information
- Full name: Victor Hugo de Medeiros da Silva
- Date of birth: 30 June 1991 (age 35)
- Place of birth: Jaboatão dos Guararapes, Brazil
- Height: 1.65 m (5 ft 5 in)
- Position: Attacking midfielder

Youth career
- 2007–2009: Náutico
- 2010: Santa Cruz

Senior career*
Years	Team	Apps	(Gls)
2010	Santa Cruz	8	(0)
2010–2012	Pinheiros-SC	0	(0)
2010–2011	→ Santos (loan)	0	(0)
2011	→ ABC (loan)	0	(0)
2012	→ Uberaba (loan)	2	(0)
2012	Santa Cruz	3	(0)
2013	Boa Esporte	0	(0)
2013	Camboriú	4	(0)
2013	Juazeiro	6	(0)
2014	Juventus-SP	0	(0)
2015	Santa Cruz-PB	5	(0)
2016	São Raimundo-PA	0	(0)
2018–2019	Salgueiro	0	(0)
- * Club domestic league appearances and goals as of 16:03, 16 November 2020 (UTC)

Victor Hugo de Medeiros da Silva (born 30 June 1991), known as Victor Hugo, is a Brazilian footballer who plays as an attacking midfielder.

== Club career ==
Born in Jaboatão dos Guararapes, Pernambuco, Victor Hugo joined Santa Cruz in December 2009, after leaving Náutico. He made his first team debut for the former on 11 April 2010, in a 2–2 away draw against Araripina for the year's Campeonato Pernambucano.

Victor Hugo scored his first senior goal on 4 July 2010, netting the opener in a 1–1 Copa do Nordeste away draw against Sergipe. After two goals in 15 matches, he left the club and joined Santos on loan in November 2010, after signing a contract with a group of businessmen who assigned his economic rights to Pinheiros-SC.

After failing to make an appearance for Santos, Victor Hugo terminated his deal in May 2011, and subsequently moved to ABC. He signed for Uberaba in 2012, after a trial period at Bangu, before returning to Santa on 5 June of that year.

After featuring rarely, Victor Hugo agreed to a contract with Boa Esporte for the 2013 campaign, but moved to Camboriú after failing to play; in that year, he also represented Juazeiro. He would spend most of the 2014 and 2015 campaigns nursing knee injuries He returned to play for São Raimundo-PA in 2016, spending another season without playing before joining Salgueiro for the 2018 campaign.

== Career statistics ==
As of 20 November 2020

Club	Season	League			State League		Cup		Continental		Other		Total	
Club	Season	Division	Apps	Goals	Apps	Goals	Apps	Goals	Apps	Goals	Apps	Goals	Apps	Goals
Santa Cruz	2010	Série D	7	0	1	0	—		—		7 (Note: Appearance (s) in Copa do Nordeste)	2	15	2
Santos	2011	Série A	0	0	0	0	0	0	—		—		7	0
ABC	2011	Série B	0	0	—		—		—		—		0	0
Uberaba	2012	Mineiro	—		2	0	—		—		—		2	0
Santa Cruz	2012	Série C	3	0	—		—		—		—		3	0
Camboriú	2013	Catarinense	—		4	0	—		—		—		4	0
Juazeiro	2013	Baiano	—		6	0	—		—		—		6	0
Juventus-SP	2014	Paulista A3	—		0	0	—		—		10 (Note: Appearance (s) in Copa Paulista)	0	10	0
Santa Cruz-PB	2015	Paraibano	—		5	0	—		—		—		5	0
São Raimundo-PA	2016	Paraense	—		0	0	—		—		—		0	0
Salgueiro	2018	Pernambucano	—		0	0	0	0	—		—		0	0
Salgueiro	2019	Série D	0	0	0	0	—		—		0	0	0	0
Salgueiro	Total		0	0	0	0	0	0	—		0	0	0	0
Career total			10	0	18	0	0	0	0	0	17	2	45	2
