= Anderson Pedra =

Brazilian footballer (born 1983)

Personal information
- Full name: Anderson Carvalho Trindade
- Date of birth: June 13, 1983 (age 43)
- Place of birth: Votuporanga, Brazil
- Height: 1.77 m (5 ft 9 1/2 in)
- Position: Defensive midfielder

Team information
- Current team: Mixto

Senior career*
Years	Team	Apps	(Gls)
2002–2006	Iraty		
2007–2008	Mogi Mirim		
2008	Paulista		
2009–2013	Santa Cruz	38	(0)
2010–2011	→ Grêmio Prudente (loan)	74	(0)
2013–2014	Sport	29	(0)
2015	Atlético Goianiense	16	(0)
2016	Votuporanguense	13	(0)
2017–2019	ABC	95	(1)
2020–	Mixto	7	(0)
- * Club domestic league appearances and goals as of 21:57, 23 September 2020 (UTC)

Anderson Carvalho Trindade, commonly known as Anderson Pedra is a Brazilian footballer who plays as a defensive midfielder for Mixto.

Born in the Votuporanga, he started his career at Iraty.

He missed most of the 2014 season due to a serious knee injury.

== Career statistics ==
(Correct as of October 16, 2010)

Club	Season	State League		Brazilian Série A		Copa do Brasil		Copa Libertadores		Copa Sudamericana		Total	
Club	Season	Apps	Goals	Apps	Goals	Apps	Goals	Apps	Goals	Apps	Goals	Apps	Goals
Grêmio Prudente	2010	16	0	22	0	-	-	-	-	2	0	40	0
Total		16	0	22	0	-	-	-	-	2	0	40	0

== Contract ==
- Grêmio Prudente.
