= Alexandre Silva (footballer) =

Brazilian footballer (born 1983)

Personal information
- Full name: Alexandre Duarte Silva
- Date of birth: 7 November 1983 (age 43)
- Place of birth: São Paulo, Brazil
- Height: 1.80 m (5 ft 11 in)
- Position: Defender

Senior career*
Years	Team	Apps	(Gls)
2006–2007	Villa Rio		
2008	Uberaba		
2008	Anápolis		
2009	Mogi Mirim		
2010	Iraty		
2010	Osvaldo Cruz		
2011	Santa Cruz		
2012	Linense		
2012	São José		
2012	Duque de Caxias		
2013	Uberaba		
- * Club domestic league appearances and goals as of 8 March 2017

Alexandre Duarte Silva (born November 7, 1983, in São Paulo), known as Alexandre Silva, is a Brazilian footballer who plays as defender.

== Career statistics ==
As of 8 March 2017

Club	Season	League			State League		Cup		Conmebol		Other		Total	
Club	Season	Division	Apps	Goals	Apps	Goals	Apps	Goals	Apps	Goals	Apps	Goals	Apps	Goals
Mogi Mirim	2009	Paulista	—		11	0	—		—		—		11	0
Iraty	2010	Paranaense	—		3	0	—		—		—		3	0
Osvaldo Cruz	2010	Paulista A2	—		4	0	—		—		—		4	0
Santa Cruz	2011	Série D	0	0	14	0	1	1	—		—		15	1
Linense	2012	Paulista	—		10	0	—		—		—		10	0
São José	2012	Paulista A2	—		—		—		—		7 (Note: All appearance(s) in Copa Paulista)	0	7	0
Duque de Caxias	2012	Série C	3	0	—		—		—		—		3	0
Uberaba	2013	Mineiro Módulo II	—		6	0	—		—		—		6	0
Career total			3	0	48	0	1	1	0	0	7	0	59	1
