= Marco Da Silva (footballer, born 1982) =

Swedish footballer

Personal information
- Full name: Marco Belo Da Silva
- Date of birth: 8 May 1982 (age 44)
- Position: Defender

Senior career*
| Years | Team | Apps | (Gls) |
- Enköpings SK
| 2005–2008 | Östers IF | | |
| 2008–2010 | IF Limhamn Bunkeflo | 74 | (3) |
- * Club domestic league appearances and goals

Marco Belo Da Silva (born 8 May 1982) is a Swedish former footballer.

== Career ==
Da Silva joined Östers IF in 2005, leaving Enköpings SK. He got his first Allsvenskan experience with ESK in 2003 and got a second chance in the top division with Öster in 2006. Even though the team was relegated, the defender was one of the best players and the solid rock in a very unstable defence line. He also captained the team for some matches when the ordinary captain was out due to injuries or suspension. Da Silva played for IF Limhamn Bunkeflo from 2008 to November 2010, seventy-four and scored three goals, before retired.
