= Jhonata (footballer) =

Brazilian footballer

Personal information
- Full name: Jhonata de Lima Ferreira
- Date of birth: September 10, 1992 (age 34)
- Place of birth: Eusébio, Brazil
- Height: 1.88 m (6 ft 2 in)
- Position: Defensive midfielder

Team information
- Current team: Central on loan from (Santa Cruz)
- Number: 8

Youth career
- 2009–2011: Santa Cruz

Senior career*
Years	Team	Apps	(Gls)
2011–	Santa Cruz	3	(0)
2012	→ Belo Jardim (loan)	4	(1)
2012	→ Chã Grande (loan)	0	(0)
2013	→ Treze (loan)	13	(0)
2013	→ Timbaúba (loan)	0	(0)
2014–	→ Central (loan)	0	(0)
- * Club domestic league appearances and goals

Jhonata de Lima Ferreira or simply Jhonata (born September 10, 1992 in Eusébio), is a Brazilian defensive midfielder. He currently plays for the Águia Negra.

== Honours ==
=== Club ===
- Santa Cruz
  - Pernambuco State League: 2011
