= Diego Lima (footballer, born 1986) =

Brazilian footballer

Personal information
- Full name: Diego Lima do Nascimento
- Date of birth: 24 April 1986 (age 40)
- Place of birth: Recife, Brazil
- Height: 1.90 m (6 ft 3 in)
- Position: Goalkeeper

Team information
- Current team: Santa Cruz
- Number: 12

Youth career
- 1999–2000: Porto-PE
- 2001: Vitória

Senior career*
Years	Team	Apps	(Gls)
2002	Vitória		
2002–2003	Atlético Paranaense		
2004	Sport		
2005	Atlético Sorocaba		
2006–2007	Cianorte		
2007–2008	Sampaio Corrêa		
2009	Atlético Lemense		
2010	Sport Club Capixaba		
2010–	Santa Cruz	9	(0)
- * Club domestic league appearances and goals

Diego Lima do Nascimento (born 24 April 1986) is a Brazilian footballer. He currently plays as goalkeeper for Santa Cruz.

== Honours ==
Winner

- Campeonato Pernambucano: 2011, 2012
