= Cleber Goiano =

Brazilian footballer (born 1979)

Personal information
- Full name: Cleber Resende de Oliveira
- Date of birth: 6 January 1979 (age 47)
- Place of birth: Heitoraí, Brazil
- Height: 1.80 m (5 ft 11 in)
- Position: Defensive midfielder

Team information
- Current team: Santa Cruz

Youth career
- 1996–1999: Vila Nova-GO

Senior career*
Years	Team	Apps	(Gls)
2000–2002	Vila Nova-GO		
2002–2008	Goiás		
2008	Ipatinga		
2009	Paulista		
2009–2010	Guarani	33	(2)
2010–2011	Fortaleza		
2011–	Santa Cruz		
- * Club domestic league appearances and goals

Cleber Resende de Oliveira or simply Cleber Goiano (born 6 January 1979), is a Brazilian professional footballer who plays as a defensive midfielder for Santa Cruz.
