= 2010 Campeonato Pernambucano =

The 2010 Campeonato Pernambucano is the 96th edition of the Campeonato Pernambucano. The formula for this edition was different from the formula adopted in previous championships, even exists an article in the Estatuto do Torcedor (Statute supporter) which prohibits changes in the regulation within two years of validity.

== Format ==
In the first phase, the teams played each other in home and away games in a league format. The top four teams advanced to the semi-finals, where the first in qualification played against the fourth, and the second against the third, over two legs. The winners of the semi-finals contested the final.

== Participating clubs ==
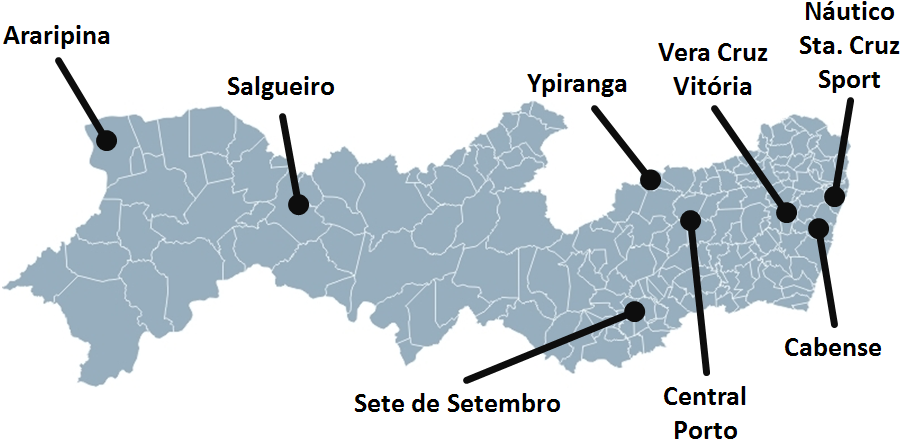
Campeonato Pernambucano 2010 map.

Club	City	Stadium
Araripina	Araripina	Chapadão do Araripe
Cabense	Cabo	Gileno de Carli
Central	Caruaru	Lacerdão
Náutico	Recife	Aflitos
Porto	Caruaru	Antônio Inácio
Salgueiro	Salgueiro	Cornélio de Barros
Santa Cruz	Recife	Arruda
Sete de Setembro	Garanhuns	Gigante do Agreste
Sport	Recife	Ilha do Retiro
Vera Cruz	Vitória	Carneirão
Vitória	Vitória	Carneirão
Ypiranga	Santa Cruz do Capibaribe	Limeirão

== First round ==
P	Team	Pts	G	W	D	L	GF	GA	GD
1	Sport	6	2	2	0	0	6	1	5
2	Cabense	6	2	2	0	0	4	2	2
3	Santa Cruz	4	2	1	1	0	3	2	1
4	Vera Cruz	4	2	1	1	0	3	2	1
5	Salgueiro	3	2	1	0	1	4	4	0
6	Araripina	3	2	1	0	1	3	3	0
7	Náutico	3	1	1	0	1	2	2	0
8	Central	2	2	0	2	0	3	3	0
9	Porto	1	2	0	1	1	4	5	-1
10	Vitória	1	2	0	1	1	3	7	-4
11	Ypiranga	0	2	0	0	2	3	5	-2
12	Sete de Setembro	0	2	0	0	2	2	4	-2
P - position; Pts – points earned; G – games played; W - matches won; D - matches drawn; L - matches lost;GF – goals for; GA – goals against; GD – goal difference
