= André Oliveira =

Brazilian footballer (born 1979)

Personal information
- Full name: André Oliveira Farias
- Date of birth: 10 February 1979 (age 47)
- Place of birth: Niterói, Brazil
- Height: 1.83 m (6 ft 0 in)
- Position: Defender

Youth career
- 1989–2000: Vasco da Gama

Senior career*
Years	Team	Apps	(Gls)
2003–2005	Uberlândia		
2006	America-RJ		
2007	Ituano		
2007–2011	Macaé		
2008	→ Vasco da Gama (loan)	6	(1)
2011–2012	Santa Cruz	34	(1)
2013	Macaé	1	(0)
2014	Madureira	11	(0)
2014	Cabofriense	3	(0)
2015	Brasília		
- * Club domestic league appearances and goals

André Oliveira Farias (born 10 February 1979), or simply André Oliveira, is a Brazilian former football defender.

== Career ==
André Oliveira began his career in football in the divisions of the base of Vasco da Gama. Then, the team drew the attention of Uberlândia, was hired to integrate the division has professional team. A quarterback who led the team back four of the interior, André Oliveira stood out among the players and the team saw and joined the American player on his roster. Games played by the team, but ended up going to where Ituano disputed the Campeonato Brasileiro Serie B In 2008 André Oliveira was part of the team Macaé under the command of coach Tita. The staff was not very well in the tournament, but drew the attention of Vasco da Gama. During the Brazilian Championship of 2008 André Oliveira was integrated into the cast of the Vasco da Gama. Returning to his club base, André Oliveira vague search between the owners and try to take the team from relegation zone. In January 2011 he was hired by Santa Cruz to compose the group you want to get access to the series C.

== Honours ==
=== Club ===
- Santa Cruz
  - Pernambuco State League: 2011
