= Careca (footballer, born 1980) =

Brazilian footballer

Personal information
- Full name: Marcos Paulo Segobe da Silva
- Date of birth: October 30, 1980 (age 46)
- Place of birth: Tambaú, Brazil
- Height: 1.80 m (5 ft 11 in)
- Position: Defensive midfielder

Team information
- Current team: Guarani

Senior career*
Years	Team	Apps	(Gls)
2001–2004	Grêmio		
2003	→ Brasil de Pelotas (loan)		
2005	Brasil de Pelotas		
2006–2007	Canoas		
2007–2008	Coritiba		
2008–2009	Guaratinguetá		
2009–2011	Ceará	42	(3)
2012	Fortaleza	6	(1)
2013	Red Bull Brasil		
2013–	Guarani		
- * Club domestic league appearances and goals as of May 18, 2013

Marcos Paulo Segobe da Silva, better known as Careca (born October 30, 1980, in Tambaú), is a Brazilian footballer who plays as a defensive midfielder.

== Career ==
He gained some recognition in Coritiba, working for a year, but year after year passed and is in Guaratinguetá years in Ceara.

== Contract ==
- Ceará.
