= Têti =

Brazilian footballer

Personal information
- Full name: Márcio de Souza Jotha
- Date of birth: 29 January 1979 (age 47)
- Place of birth: Cabo Frio RJ, Brazil
- Height: 1.72 m (5 ft 7 1/2 in)
- Position: Midfielder

Youth career
- 1998–2000: Cabofriense

Senior career*
Years	Team	Apps	(Gls)
2001–2002	Cabofriense		
2002	Friburguense		
2003–2004	Botafogo		
2005	Cabofriense		
2005–2006	Vasco da Gama		
2006–2007	Paysandu		
2007	Ituano		
2007	Caldense		
2007	Coruripe		
2008	Cabofriense		
2008–2009	Estrela da Amadora		
2009	Boavista		
2009	América		
2010–2011	Brusque		
2010	→ Criciúma (loan)		
2011	Santa Cruz		
2011–2012	Caxias		
2012	Brasil de Pelotas		
2013–2015	Cabofriense		
- * Club domestic league appearances and goals as of 1 October 2017 ‡ National team caps and goals as of 1 October 2017

Márcio de Souza Jotha (born 29 January 1979 in Cabo Frio, Rio de Janeiro), known as Têti, is a Brazilian former football midfielder, who played for a number of clubs in Portugal and Brazil.

== Honours ==
Cabofriense

- Campeonato Carioca Série B: 1998

Santa Cruz

- Campeonato Pernambucano: 2011
