= Léo Bartholo =

Brazilian footballer

Personal information
- Full name: Leonardo Bartholo Prando
- Date of birth: May 24, 1987 (age 39)
- Place of birth: Foz do Iguaçu, Brazil
- Height: 1.83 m (6 ft 0 in)
- Position: Midfielder

Team information
- Current team: União Beltrão

Youth career
- 2003–2006: Foz do Iguaçu

Senior career*
Years	Team	Apps	(Gls)
2007	Treze	0	(0)
2008	Foz do Iguaçu	0	(0)
2009–2013	Santa Cruz	25	(6)
2010	→ Botafogo (loan)	11	(0)
2012	→ Bragantino (loan)	5	(0)
2014	Botafogo-SP	7	(0)
2014	Treze	0	(0)
2015	Foz do Iguaçu	14	(0)
2015	Mogi Mirim	11	(0)
2016	Tigres do Brasil	6	(0)
2017	Tricordiano	10	(0)
2017	Boa Esporte	5	(0)
2018	Thai Honda	20	(0)
2019	Cascavel	0	(0)
2019	Maringá	3	(0)
2020–	União Beltrão	0	(0)
- * Club domestic league appearances and goals

Leonardo Bartholo Prando (born May 24, 1987 in Foz do Iguaçu), or simply Léo , is a Brazilian midfielder. He currently plays for União Beltrão.

== Career ==
In April 2019, Léo Bartholo joined Maringá.

== Honours ==
=== Club ===
- Santa Cruz
  - Pernambuco State League: 2011
