= Landu (Brazilian footballer) =

Brazilian footballer

Personal information
- Full name: Landoaldo Gomes dos Santos
- Date of birth: 23 May 1978 (age 48)
- Place of birth: Belém, Brazil
- Height: 1.69 m (5 ft 7 in)
- Position: Forward

Senior career*
Years	Team	Apps	(Gls)
2003	Ananindeua		
2004	Remo		
2004	Tuna Luso		
2005	Remo		
2005	Abaeté		
2006–2007	Remo		
2008–2012	Itumbiara		
2008	→ Vasco da Gama (loan)		
2008	→ Gama (loan)		
2010	→ Remo (loan)		
2011	→ Santa Cruz (loan)		
2012	Vitória-PE		
2012	Sobradinho		
2012	São Raimundo-PA		
2013	Cametá		
2013	Caldas Novas		
2013	Castanhal		
2014	Conilon		
2015	Venus-PA		
- * Club domestic league appearances and goals as of 19 October 2023

Landoaldo Gomes dos Santos (born 23 May 1978), better known as Landu, is a Brazilian former professional footballer who played as a forward.

== Career ==
Landu was one of Remo's biggest highlights in the 2005 Série C title campaign. He also played for Itumbiara, Vasco da Gama, Santa Cruz among others.

== Personal life ==
In 2007, Landu briefly took a break from his career due to a testicular tumour. In 2021, a fake news that the player had died was spread on social media.

== Honours ==
Remo

- Campeonato Brasileiro Série C: 2005

Itumbiara

- Campeonato Goiano: 2008

Santa Cruz

- Campeonato Pernambucano: 2011
