= Rio Verde Esporte Clube =

Brazilian football team

Rio Verde
- Full name: Rio Verde Esporte Clube
- Nickname(s): RVEC; Chama Rio Verdense
- Founded: 1956
- Ground: Estádio Cezário Balbino de Freitas, Rio Verde de Mato Grosso, Mato Grosso do Sul state, Brazil
- Capacity: 3,000
Home colours	Away colours

Rio Verde Esporte Clube, commonly known as Rio Verde, is a Brazilian football team based in Rio Verde de Mato Grosso, Mato Grosso do Sul state.

== History ==
The club was founded on December 17, 1991. Rio Verde won the Campeonato Sul-Mato-Grossense Second Level in 2004.

== Achievements ==
- Campeonato Sul-Mato-Grossense Second Level:
  - Winners (1): 2004

== Stadium ==
Rio Verde Esporte Clube play their home games at Estádio Cezário Balbino de Freitas. The stadium has a maximum capacity of 3,000 people.
