= Araripina Futebol Clube =

Brazilian football club

Araripina
- Full name: Araripina Futebol Clube
- Nickname: Bode do Sertão
- Founded: September 11, 2008 (17 years ago)
- Ground: Chapadão do Araripe, Araripina, Pernambuco, Brazil
- Capacity: 5,000
- Chairman: Alexandre José de Alencar Arraes
- Manager: Williams Rodrigues
- League: Campeonato Pernambucano
- 2009: Campeonato Pernambucano Série A2, 2nd (promoted)
Home colours	Away colours

Araripina Futebol Clube is a football team based in Araripina in Pernambuco. Founded in 2008, they played in the Série A1 of the Campeonato Pernambucano between 2010 and 2012.

== Stadium ==
Araripina plays their home matches at the Estádio Gilson Tiburtino de Souza, known as Chapadão do Araripe, which has a capacity of 5,000 seats.

== Current squad ==
Note: Flags indicate national team as defined under FIFA eligibility rules; some limited exceptions apply. Players may hold more than one non-FIFA nationality.

No.	Pos.	Nation	Player
—	MF	BRA	Dyego Araripe (contract)
—	MF	BRA	Felipe (contract)
—	MF	BRA	Serginho Baiano

No.	Pos.	Nation	Player
—	FW	BRA	Renan Paixão (contract)
—		BRA	Alexandre (contract)
—		BRA	Tiago (contract)
