= 2011 Sport Club do Recife season =

Sport Recife
2011 season
- Chairman: Gustavo Dubeux
- Manager: Geninho; Gustavo Bueno (c); Hélio dos Anjos; PC Gusmão; Mazola Júnior
- Stadium: Ilha do Retiro
- Série B: 4th
- Pernambucano: Runners-up
- Copa do Brasil: First round
- Top goalscorer: League: Bruno Mineiro (12); Marcelinho Paraíba (12); All: Marcelinho Paraíba (16)
Home colours	Away colours	Third colours

The 2011 season was Sport Recife's 107th season in the club's history. Sport competed in the Campeonato Pernambucano, Série B and Copa do Brasil.

== Squad ==
Note: Flags indicate national team as defined under FIFA eligibility rules; some limited exceptions apply. Players may hold more than one non-FIFA nationality.

No.	Pos.	Nation	Player
—	GK	BRA	Magrão
—	GK	BRA	Saulo
—	GK	BRA	Paulo Sérgio
—	GK	BRA	Rodrigo Calaça
—	GK	BRA	Paulo Rafael
—	GK	BRA	Thiago
—	DF	BRA	Wellington Saci
—	DF	BRA	Renato
—	DF	BRA	Montoya
—	DF	BRA	César Lucena (captain)
—	DF	BRA	Gabriel
—	DF	BRA	Alex Bruno
—	DF	BRA	Tobi
—	DF	BRA	Moacir
—	DF	BRA	Raul
—	DF	BRA	Vitor Hugo
—	DF	BRA	Diogo
—	MF	BRA	Thiaguinho
—	MF	BRA	Germano
—	MF	BRA	Naldinho

No.	Pos.	Nation	Player
—	MF	TOG	Hamílton
—	MF	BRA	Josias
—	MF	BRA	Daniel Paulista
—	MF	BRA	Robston
—	MF	BRA	Marcelinho Paraíba
—	MF	BRA	Rithely
—	MF	BRA	Danilo
—	MF	BRA	Willians
—	MF	BRA	Maylson
—	MF	BRA	Diego Torres
—	MF	BRA	Roberson
—	MF	BRA	Branquinho
—	FW	BRA	Bruno Mineiro
—	FW	BRA	Danielzinho
—	FW	BRA	Paulista
—	FW	BRA	Juninho Potiguar
—	FW	BRA	Júnior Viçosa
—	FW	BRA	Willian Araújo
—	FW	BRA	Misael

== Statistics ==
=== Overall ===
Games played	66 (26 Pernambucano, 2 Copa do Brasil, 38 Série B)
Games won	30 (13 Pernambucano, 0 Copa do Brasil, 17 Série B)
Games drawn	16 (4 Pernambucano, 2 Copa do Brasil, 10 Série B)
Games lost	20 (9 Pernambucano, 0 Copa do Brasil, 11 Série B)
Goals scored	99
Goals conceded	72
Goal difference	+27
Best results (goal difference)	5–0 (H) v Araripina - Pernambucano - 2011.03.12
Worst result (goal difference)	0–3 (A) v Boa Esporte - Série B - 2011.08.06; 0–3 (A) v ABC - Série B - 2011.10.01
Top scorer	Marcelinho Paraíba (16)

Source: Sport Recife official website

=== Goalscorers ===
Place	Pos.	Nat.	No.	Name	Campeonato Pernambucano	Copa do Brasil	Série B	Total
1	MF	(Brazil)	10	Marcelinho Paraíba	4	0	12	16
2	FW	(Brazil)	9	Bruno Mineiro	3	0	12	15
3	FW	(Brazil)		Carlinhos Bala	7	0	0	7
3	MF	(Brazil)	11	Willians	0	0	7	7
4	DF	(Brazil)	6	Wellington Saci	3	1	2	6
5	FW	(Brazil)		Júnior Viçosa	0	0	4	4
5	MF	(Brazil)		Maylson	0	0	4	4
6	MF	(Brazil)		Germano	3	0	0	3
6	FW	(Brazil)	9	Roberson	0	0	3	3
6	MF	(Brazil)	8	Thiaguinho	3	0	0	3
7	FW	(Brazil)	11	Ciro	2	0	0	2
7	MF	(Brazil)	8	Daniel Paulista	1	0	1	2
7	DF	(Brazil)	4	Gabriel	0	0	2	2
7	DF	(Brazil)	7	Tobi	1	0	1	2
7	MF	(Togo)	5	Hamílton	0	0	2	2
7	DF	(Brazil)		Montoya	1	0	1	2
7	MF	(Brazil)		Naldinho	0	0	2	2
7	FW	(Brazil)		Tadeu	1	1	0	2
8	FW	(Brazil)		Alessandro	1	0	0	1
8	FW	(Brazil)		Danielzinho	0	0	1	1
8	MF	(Brazil)		Diego Torres	0	0	1	1
8	MF	(Brazil)		Fabrício	1	0	0	1
8	DF	(Brazil)	3	Igor	1	0	0	1
8	MF	(Brazil)		Moacir	0	0	1	1
8	FW	(Brazil)		Paulista	0	0	1	1
8	DF	(Brazil)	2	Renato	0	0	1	1
8	MF	(Brazil)	5	Rithely	0	0	1	1
8	MF	(Brazil)	7	Robston	0	0	1	1
8	GK	(Brazil)	1	Saulo	1	0	0	1
8	DF	(Brazil)		Vítor	1	0	0	1
				Own goals	1	0	2	3
				Total	35	2	62	99

=== Managers performance ===
Name	From	To	P	W	D	L	GF	GA	Avg%	Ref
(Brazil) Geninho	13 January 2011	6 February 2011	9	4	2	3	7	8	51%	
(Brazil) Gustavo Bueno (c)	9 February 2011		1	0	0	1	0	1	0%	
(Brazil) Hélio dos Anjos	13 February 2011	18 June 2011	24	11	7	6	35	24	55%	
(Brazil) Mazola Júnior (c)	24 June 2011	20 August 2011	12	5	2	5	21	18	47%	
(Brazil) PC Gusmão	23 August 2011	29 October 2011	15	6	4	5	22	18	48%	
(Brazil) Mazola Júnior	4 November 2011	26 November 2011	5	4	1	0	14	3	86%	

(c) Indicates the caretaker manager

== Competitions ==
=== Campeonato Pernambucano ===
==== First stage ====
13 January 2011 1	Sport	1–0	América–PE	Recife
19:30 (UTC-3)	Carlinhos Bala	Report		Stadium: Estádio Adelmar da Costa Carvalho (Ilha do Retiro); Referee: Claudio Mercante

16 January 2011 2	Petrolina	1–1	Sport	Petrolina
16:00 (UTC-3)	Bruno Maranhão 53'	Report	Demir 85' (o.g.)	Stadium: Estádio Paulo de Souza Coelho; Referee: Antônio Hora Filho

18 January 2011 3	Cabense	1–0	Sport	Cabo de Santo Agostinho
20:00 (UTC-3)	Rosivaldo 54'	Report		Stadium: Estádio Gileno de Carli; Attendance: 5,476; Referee: Emerson Sobral

20 January 2011 4	Sport	1–0	Ypiranga	Recife
20:00 (UTC-3)	Germano 13'	Report		Stadium: Estádio Adelmar da Costa Carvalho (Ilha do Retiro); Referee: Gleydson Leite

23 January 2011 5	Araripina	2–0	Sport	Araripina
16:00 (UTC-3)	Marcelinho; Germano (o.g.)	Report		Stadium: Estádio Gilson Tiburtino de Souza (Chapadão do Araripe)

26 January 2011 6	Salgueiro	0–0	Sport	Salgueiro
21:00 (UTC-3)		Report		Stadium: Estádio Cornélio de Barros (Salgueirão); Attendance: 4,589; Referee: Carlos Costa

31 January 2011 7	Sport	2–1	Vitória das Tabocas	Recife
19:30 (UTC-3)	Thiaguinho 37'; Saulo 90'	Report	Robertinho 48'	Stadium: Estádio Adelmar da Costa Carvalho (Ilha do Retiro)

3 February 2011 8	Sport	2–1	Central	Recife
20:00 (UTC-3)	Igor 38'; Thiaguinho 43'	Report	Danilo Pitbull 5'	Stadium: Estádio Adelmar da Costa Carvalho (Ilha do Retiro)

6 February 2011 9	Santa Cruz	2–0	Sport	Recife
16:00 (UTC-3)	Thiago Cunha; Renatinho	Report		Stadium: Estádio José do Rego Maciel (Arruda); Attendance: 45,621; Referee: Emerson Sobral

9 February 2011 10	Porto	1–0	Sport	Caruaru
21:00 (UTC-3)	Kiros 44'	Report		Stadium: Estádio Luiz José de Lacerda (Lacerdão); Attendance: 6,819; Referee: Sebastião Rufino Filho

13 February 2011 11	Sport	1–1	Náutico	Recife
16:00 (UTC-3)	Alessandro (pen.)	Report	Ricardo Xavier	Stadium: Estádio Adelmar da Costa Carvalho (Ilha do Retiro); Attendance: 26,574; Referee: Antônio Hora Filho

16 February 2011 12	América–PE	0–1	Sport	Paulista
21:00 (UTC-3)		Report	Carlinhos Bala	Stadium: Estádio Ademir Cunha; Attendance: 5,771; Referee: Gilberto Castro Júnior

20 February 2011 13	Sport	3–1	Petrolina	Recife
17:00 (UTC-3)	Germano; Wellington Saci (pen.); Thiaguinho	Report	Rogério	Stadium: Estádio Adelmar da Costa Carvalho (Ilha do Retiro); Attendance: 15,809; Referee: Ricardo Tavares

27 February 2011 14	Ypiranga	1–2	Sport	Santa Cruz do Capibaribe
16:00 (UTC-3)	Sidnei 32'	Report	Ciro 22'; Tobi 80'	Stadium: Estádio Otávio Limeira Alves; Attendance: 4,643; Referee: Carlos Costa

9 March 2011 15	Sport	0–0	Salgueiro	Recife
20:00 (UTC-3)		Report		Stadium: Estádio Adelmar da Costa Carvalho (Ilha do Retiro)

12 March 2011 16	Sport	5–0	Araripina	Recife
18:30 (UTC-3)	Carlinhos Bala 14', Wellington Saci; Daniel Paulista 85'; Bruno Mineiro	Report		Stadium: Estádio Adelmar da Costa Carvalho (Ilha do Retiro); Attendance: 14,454; Referee: Ricardo Tavares

20 March 2011 17	Vitória das Tabocas	2–1	Sport	Vitória de Santo Antão
16:00 (UTC-3)	Aleandro 37'; Nando 82' (pen.)	Report	Fabrício 45+2'	Stadium: Estádio Municipal Severino Cândido Carneiro (Carneirão); Attendance: 6,280; Referee: Sebastião Rufino Filho

24 March 2011 18	Sport	3–0	Cabense	Recife
20:00 (UTC-3)	Marcelinho Paraíba (pen.); Carlinhos Bala 57'; Tadeu 78'	Report		Stadium: Estádio Adelmar da Costa Carvalho (Ilha do Retiro); Attendance: 17,577; Referee: Cláudio Mercante

27 March 2011 19	Central	2–3	Sport	Caruaru
16:00 (UTC-3)	Wilson Surubim,	Report	Germano; Carlinhos Bala; Vítor	Stadium: Estádio Luiz José de Lacerda (Lacerdão); Attendance: 12,058; Referee: Niélson Nogueira

3 April 2011 20	Sport	0–2	Santa Cruz	Recife
16:00 (UTC-3)		Report	Gilberto,	Stadium: Estádio Adelmar da Costa Carvalho (Ilha do Retiro); Attendance: 29,015; Referee: Cláudio Mercante

9 April 2011 21	Sport	3–1	Porto	Recife
20:00 (UTC-3)	Wellington Saci 19'; Marcelinho Paraíba; Montoya	Report	Paulista	Stadium: Estádio Adelmar da Costa Carvalho (Ilha do Retiro); Attendance: 16,715; Referee: Gleydson Leite

17 April 2011 22	Náutico	1–0	Sport	Recife
16:00 (UTC-3)	Bruno Meneghel 62'	Report		Stadium: Estádio Eládio de Barros Carvalho (Aflitos); Attendance: 12,287; Referee: Sebastião Rufino Filho

==== Semi-finals ====
24 April 2011	Sport	3–1	Náutico	Recife
16:00 (UTC-3)	Bruno Mineiro 26'; Marcelinho Paraíba 45+1'; Ciro 88'	Report	Rogério 81'	Stadium: Estádio Adelmar da Costa Carvalho (Ilha do Retiro); Attendance: 23,601; Referee: Cláudio Mercante

1 May 2011	Náutico	3–2	Sport	Recife
16:00 (UTC-3)	Kieza 18', 79'; Everton Luiz 65'	Report	Carlinhos Bala 25'; Bruno Mineiro 62'	Stadium: Estádio Eládio de Barros Carvalho (Aflitos); Referee: Sálvio Spínola

==== Finals ====
8 May 2011	Sport	0–2	Santa Cruz	Recife
16:00 (UTC-3)		Report	Gilberto 33'; Landu 64'	Stadium: Estádio Adelmar da Costa Carvalho (Ilha do Retiro); Attendance: 30,169; Referee: Cláudio Mercante Júnior

15 May 2011	Santa Cruz	0–1	Sport	Recife
16:00 (UTC-3)		Report	Marcelinho Paraíba 90+3' (pen.)	Stadium: Estádio José do Rego Maciel (Arruda); Attendance: 62,243; Referee: Sálvio Spínola Fagundes Filho

==== Record ====
Final Position	Points	Matches	Wins	Draws	Losses	Goals For	Goals Away	Avg%
2nd	43	26	13	4	9	35	26	55%

=== Copa do Brasil ===
==== First round ====
24 February 2011	Sampaio Corrêa	0–0	Sport	São Luís
21:00 (UTC-3)		Report		Stadium: Estádio Municipal Nhozinho Santos; Referee: Joaquim Florenço Martins

2 March 2011	Sport	2–2 (a)	Sampaio Corrêa	Recife
21:50 (UTC-3)	Wellington Saci 51'; Tadeu 66'	Report	Robinho 19'; Rony 69'	Stadium: Estádio Adelmar da Costa Carvalho (Ilha do Retiro); Attendance: 9,615; Referee: Diego Pombo Lopez

==== Record ====
Final Position	Points	Matches	Wins	Draws	Losses	Goals For	Goals Away	Avg%
42nd	2	2	0	2	0	2	2	33%

=== Série B ===
21 May 2011 1	Sport	1–0	Icasa	Recife
16:20 (UTC-3)	Daniel Paulista 2'	Report		Stadium: Estádio Adelmar da Costa Carvalho (Ilha do Retiro); Attendance: 18,583; Referee: Ítalo Medeiros de Azevedo

28 May 2011 2	Guarani	1–1	Sport	Campinas
16:20 (UTC-3)	Fernandão 17'	Report	Paulista 54'	Stadium: Estádio Brinco de Ouro da Princesa; Attendance: 4,122; Referee: Emerson de Almeida Ferreira

31 May 2011 3	Sport	1–0	Barueri	Recife
21:00 (UTC-3)	Marcelinho Paraíba 30'	Report		Stadium: Estádio Adelmar da Costa Carvalho (Ilha do Retiro); Attendance: 17,063; Referee: Antônio Hora Filho

11 June 2011 4	ASA	1–1	Sport	Arapiraca
16:20 (UTC-3)	Alexsandro 14'	Report	Rithely 51'	Stadium: Estádio Municipal Coaracy da Mata Fonseca; Attendance: 8,350; Referee: Rogério Lima

14 June 2011 5	Sport	1–1	Duque de Caxias	Recife
21:50 (UTC-3)	Willians 27'	Report	Somália 69'	Stadium: Estádio Adelmar da Costa Carvalho (Ilha do Retiro); Attendance: 15,131; Referee: Francisco Assis Almeida Filho

18 June 2011 6	Vitória	2–0	Sport	Salvador
16:20 (UTC-3)	Alison 63'; Rildo 80'	Report		Stadium: Estádio Manoel Barradas (Barradão); Attendance: 9,310; Referee: Marcelo de Lima Henrique

24 June 2011 7	Sport	0–0	Criciúma	Recife
21:00 (UTC-3)		Report		Stadium: Estádio Adelmar da Costa Carvalho (Ilha do Retiro); Attendance: 14,488; Referee: Charles Cavalcante Ferreira

28 June 2011 8	Sport	2–0	ABC	Recife
19:30 (UTC-3)	Moacir 8'; Hamílton 73'	Report		Stadium: Estádio Adelmar da Costa Carvalho (Ilha do Retiro); Attendance: 16,909; Referee: Flávio Feijó

2 July 2011 9	São Caetano	3–3	Sport	São Caetano do Sul
16:20 (UTC-3)	Antônio Flávio 17'; Luciano Mandi 34'; Allan Dias 52'	Report	Danielzinho 27'; Bruno Mineiro 71'; Gabriel 82'	Stadium: Estádio Municipal Anacleto Campanella; Attendance: 858; Referee: Pathrice Wallace Corrêa Maia

9 July 2011 10	Sport	3–1	Ponte Preta	Recife
21:00 (UTC-3)	Leandro 1' (o.g.); Diego Torres 71'; Naldinho 89'	Report	Ricardinho 78'	Stadium: Estádio Adelmar da Costa Carvalho (Ilha do Retiro); Attendance: 19,685; Referee: Francisco Carlos Nascimento

16 July 2011 11	Bragantino	3–2	Sport	Bragança Paulista
16:20 (UTC-3)	Luiz Carlos 1'; Lincom 23'; Luís Felipe 74'	Report	Tobi 31'; Bruno Mineiro 36'	Stadium: Estádio Nabi Abi Chedid; Attendance: 1,557; Referee: Felipe Gomes da Silva

22 July 2011 12	Sport	3–0	Salgueiro	Recife
21:00 (UTC-3)	Marcelinho Paraíba 22' (pen.); Bruno Mineiro 51', 72'	Report		Stadium: Estádio Adelmar da Costa Carvalho (Ilha do Retiro); Attendance: 18,027

26 July 2011 13	Goiás	2–1	Sport	Goiânia
19:30 (UTC-3)	Douglas 3'; Alan Bahia 69'	Report	Carlos Alberto 45' (o.g.)	Stadium: Estádio do Governo do Estado de Goiás (Serra Dourada); Attendance: 20,018; Referee: Fabrício Neves Corrêa

6 August 2011 15	Boa Esporte	3–0	Sport	Varginha
16:20 (UTC-3)	Jackson 9', 79'; Jheimy 37'	Report		Stadium: Estádio Municipal Prefeito Dilson Luiz de Melo (Melão); Attendance: 5,885; Referee: Vinícius Costa da Costa

9 August 2011 14*	Sport	2–0	Náutico	Recife
21:00 (UTC-3)	Marcelinho Paraíba 59'; Maylson 80'	Report		Stadium: Estádio Adelmar da Costa Carvalho (Ilha do Retiro); Attendance: 19,028; Referee: Heber Roberto Lopes

13 August 2011 16	Sport	2–3	Portuguesa	Recife
16:20 (UTC-3)	Willians 72'; Maylson 90+2'	Report	Marco Antônio 57'; Henrique 69'; Edno 84' (pen.)	Stadium: Estádio Adelmar da Costa Carvalho (Ilha do Retiro); Attendance: 22,043; Referee: Wagner do Nascimento Magalhães

16 August 2011 17	Americana	2–1	Sport	Americana
21:50 (UTC-3)	Fumagalli 53', 85' (pen.)	Report	Marcelinho Paraíba 42'	Stadium: Estádio Décio Vitta; Attendance: 902; Referee: Pablo dos Santos Alves

20 August 2011 18	Paraná	1–2	Sport	Curitiba
16:20 (UTC-3)	Éverton Garroni 64'	Report	Willians 20'; Júnior Viçosa 76'	Stadium: Estádio Durival Britto e Silva (Vila Capanema); Attendance: 5,665; Referee: Marcos André Gomes da Penha

23 August 2011 19	Sport	2–0	Vila Nova	Recife
20:30 (UTC-3)	Willians 7'; Naldinho 38'	Report		Stadium: Estádio Adelmar da Costa Carvalho (Ilha do Retiro); Attendance: 7,022; Referee: Cláudio Francisco Lima e Silva

30 August 2011 20	Icasa	2–2	Sport	Juazeiro do Norte
20:30 (UTC-3)	Marcelinho Paraíba 22', 88'	Report	Gabriel 7' (o.g.); Preto 29'	Stadium: Estádio Mauro Sampaio (Romeirão); Attendance: 3,726; Referee: José Carlos de Sousa

3 September 2011 21	Sport	3–1	Guarani	Recife
16:20 (UTC-3)	Willians 1'; Bruno Mineiro 53', 75'	Report	Denílson 40'	Stadium: Estádio Adelmar da Costa Carvalho (Ilha do Retiro); Attendance: 19,026; Referee: Manoel Nunes Lopo Garrido

10 September 2011 22	Barueri	2–3	Sport	Barueri
16:20 (UTC-3)	Marcelinho 26'; Alex Maranhão 42'	Report	Willians 10'; Marcelinho Paraíba 40'; Bruno Mineiro 84'	Stadium: Arena Barueri; Attendance: 5,446; Referee: Jean Pierre Gonçalves

13 September 2011 23	Sport	3–0	ASA	Recife
20:30 (UTC-3)	Bruno Mineiro 12', 54'; Júnior Viçosa 44'	Report		Stadium: Estádio Adelmar da Costa Carvalho (Ilha do Retiro); Attendance: 21,637; Referee: Arilson Bispo da Anunciação

16 September 2011 24	Duque de Caxias	1–1	Sport	Mesquita
20:30 (UTC-3)	Gilcimar 35'	Report	Marcelinho Paraíba 9'	Stadium: Estádio Giulite Coutinho; Attendance: 191; Referee: Paulo Godoy Bezerra

24 September 2011 25	Sport	4–0	Vitória	Recife
16:20 (UTC-3)	Marcelinho Paraíba 2'; Willians 25'; Bruno Mineiro 60'; Wellington Saci 78' (pen.)	Report		Stadium: Estádio Adelmar da Costa Carvalho (Ilha do Retiro); Attendance: 26,231; Referee: Ricardo Marques Ribeiro

27 September 2011 26	Criciúma	1–0	Sport	Criciúma
20:30 (UTC-3)	Ronny 18'	Report		Stadium: Estádio Heriberto Hülse; Attendance: 5,873; Referee: Wilton Pereira de Sampaio

1 October 2011 27	ABC	3–0	Sport	Natal
16:20 (UTC-3)	Cascata 30' (pen.); Lins 32'; Leandrão 90+3'	Report		Stadium: Estádio Maria Lamas Farache (Frasqueirão); Attendance: 9,981; Referee: Emerson de Almeida Ferreira

4 October 2011 28	Sport	1–3	São Caetano	Recife
20:30 (UTC-3)	Bruno Mineiro 53'	Report	Artur 32', 34'; Nunes 58'	Stadium: Estádio Adelmar da Costa Carvalho (Ilha do Retiro); Referee: José Acácio da Rocha

8 October 2011 29	Ponte Preta	1–1	Sport	Campinas
16:20 (UTC-3)	Renato Cajá 13'	Report	Maylson 78'	Stadium: Estádio Moisés Lucarelli; Referee: Célio Amorim

14 October 2011 30	Sport	1–1	Bragantino	Recife
20:30 (UTC-3)	Renato 64'	Report	Léo Jaime 58'	Stadium: Estádio Adelmar da Costa Carvalho (Ilha do Retiro); Referee: Antônio Frederico Carvalho Schneider

18 October 2011 31	Salgueiro	0–1	Sport	Paulista
21:00 (UTC-3)		Report	Maylson 70'	Stadium: Estádio Ademir Cunha; Attendance: 7,134; Referee: Emerson Luiz Sobral

22 October 2011 32	Sport	0–1	Goiás	Recife
16:20 (UTC-3)		Report	Iarley 90'	Stadium: Estádio Adelmar da Costa Carvalho (Ilha do Retiro); Attendance: 19,733; Referee: Anderson Daronco

29 October 2011 33	Náutico	2–0	Sport	Recife
16:20 (UTC-3)	Marlon 23'; Elicarlos 30'	Report		Stadium: Estádio Eládio de Barros Carvalho (Aflitos); Attendance: 17,164; Referee: Gutemberg de Paula Fonseca

4 November 2011 34	Sport	4–1	Boa Esporte	Recife
20:30 (UTC-3)	Hamílton 58'; Júnior Viçosa 62', 87'; Roberson 70'	Report	Jheimy 2'	Stadium: Estádio Adelmar da Costa Carvalho (Ilha do Retiro); Referee: Dewson Fernando Freitas da Silva

8 November 2011 35	Portuguesa	2–2	Sport	Recife
20:30 (UTC-3)	Marco Antônio 59'; Luis Ricardo 73'	Report	Montoya 3'; Robston 79'	Stadium: Estádio Adelmar da Costa Carvalho (Ilha do Retiro); Attendance: 12,829; Referee: Heber Roberto Lopes

11 November 2011 36	Sport	4–0	Americana	Recife
20:30 (UTC-3)	Marcelinho Paraíba 25', 44'; Gabriel 36'; Wellington Saci 40'	Report		Stadium: Estádio Adelmar da Costa Carvalho (Ilha do Retiro); Attendance: 15,563; Referee: Sandro Meira Ricci

19 November 2011 37	Sport	3–0	Paraná	Recife
17:00 (UTC-3)	Marcelinho Paraíba 19'; Roberson 44', 86'	Report		Stadium: Estádio Adelmar da Costa Carvalho (Ilha do Retiro); Referee: Pericles Bassols Pegado Cortez

26 November 2011 38	Vila Nova	0–1	Sport	Goiânia
17:00 (UTC-3)		Report	Bruno Mineiro 72'	Stadium: Estádio do Governo do Estado de Goiás (Serra Dourada); Referee: Heber Roberto Lopes

==== Record ====
Final Position	Points	Matches	Wins	Draws	Losses	Goals For	Goals Away	Avg%
4th	61	38	17	10	11	62	44	53%
