= 2013 Sport Club do Recife season =

Sport Recife
2013 season
- Chairman: João Humberto Martorelli
- Manager: Vadão; Gustavo Bueno (c); Sérgio Guedes; Marcelo Martelotte; Neco (c); Geninho
- Stadium: Ilha do Retiro
- Série B: 3rd
- Pernambucano: Runners-up
- Copa do Brasil: Second round
- Copa do Nordeste: Second stage
- Copa Sudamericana: Second round
- Top goalscorer: League: Marcos Aurélio (22); All: Marcos Aurélio (32)
Home colours	Away colours

The 2013 season was Sport Recife's 109th season in the club's history. Sport competed in the Campeonato Pernambucano, Copa do Nordeste, Copa Sudamericana, Série B and Copa do Brasil.

== Final Squad ==
Note: Flags indicate national team as defined under FIFA eligibility rules; some limited exceptions apply. Players may hold more than one non-FIFA nationality.

No.	Pos.	Nation	Player
1	GK	BRA	Magrão
3	DF	BRA	Marcelo Cordeiro
6	DF	BRA	Pereira
8	MF	BRA	Aílton
10	FW	BRA	Marcos Aurélio
11	FW	BRA	Felipe Azevedo
12	DF	BRA	Patric
18	FW	BRA	Érico Júnior
19	MF	BRA	Lucas Lima
21	MF	BRA	Rithely
22	DF	BRA	Oswaldo
26	DF	BRA	Renê
30	MF	BRA	Welton

No.	Pos.	Nation	Player
31	MF	BRA	Anderson Pedra
33	MF	BOL	Chumacero
35	FW	BRA	Sandrinho
36	MF	BRA	Naldinho
37	GK	BRA	Flávio
39	FW	BRA	Neto Baiano
87	GK	BRA	Saulo
99	FW	BRA	Diego Maurício
—	DF	BRA	Ferron
—	DF	BRA	Renato
—	MF	BRA	Diogo Oliveira
—	MF	BRA	Rodrigo Mancha
—	FW	BRA	Ruan

== Statistics ==
=== Overall ===
Games played	69 (15 Pernambucano, 8 Copa do Nordeste, 4 Copa do Brasil, 4 Copa Sudamericana, 38 Série B)
Games won	34 (8 Pernambucano, 3 Copa do Nordeste, 2 Copa do Brasil, 1 Copa Sudamericana, 20 Série B)
Games drawn	12 (4 Pernambucano, 5 Copa do Nordeste, 0 Copa do Brasil, 0 Copa Sudamericana, 3 Série B)
Games lost	23 (3 Pernambucano, 0 Copa do Nordeste, 2 Copa do Brasil, 3 Copa Sudamericana, 15 Série B)
Goals scored	120
Goals conceded	89
Goal difference	+31
Best results (goal difference)	6–1 (H) v Sousa - Copa do Nordeste - 2013.02.06
Worst result (goal difference)	0–5 (A) v América–MG - Série B - 2013.07.30
Top scorer	Marcos Aurélio (32)

Source: Sport Recife official website

=== Goalscorers ===
Place	Pos.	Nat.	No.	Name	Copa do Nordeste	Campeonato Pernambucano	Copa do Brasil	Copa Sudamericana	Série B	Total
1	FW	(Brazil)	10	Marcos Aurélio	4	5	1	0	22	32
2	MF	(Brazil)	11	Felipe Azevedo	3	6	0	1	3	13
3	MF	(Brazil)	19	Lucas Lima	0	2	0	0	7	9
4	FW	(Brazil)	9	Roger	1	7	0	0	0	8
5	FW	(Brazil)	9	Neto Baiano	0	0	0	0	7	7
=	MF	(Brazil)	21	Rithely	0	1	1	0	5	7
6	DF	(Brazil)	4	Gabriel Santos	0	1	0	0	4	5
7	FF	(Brazil)		Felipe Menezes	3	1	0	0	0	4
=	DF	(Brazil)	12	Patric	0	0	0	1	3	4
=	DF	(Brazil)	6	Reinaldo	1	3	0	0	0	4
8	MF	(Brazil)	29	Camilo	0	0	0	0	3	3
=	FW	(Brazil)		Mateus Lima	0	3	0	0	0	3
=	FW	(Brazil)	17	Nunes	0	0	0	0	3	3
=	DF	(Brazil)	5	Tobi	0	1	0	0	2	3
9	DF	(Brazil)	2	Cicinho	0	2	0	0	0	2
=	MF	(Brazil)		Hugo	1	1	0	0	0	2
=	DF	(Brazil)	3	Marcelo Cordeiro	0	0	0	0	2	2
=	MF	(Brazil)	15	Renan Teixeira	0	0	1	0	1	2
10	DF	(Brazil)	13	Ailson	0	0	0	1	0	1
=	MF	(Brazil)	10	Ailton	0	0	0	0	1	1
=	MF	(Brazil)	18	Érico Júnior	0	0	1	0	0	1
=	DF	(Brazil)	33	Maurício	0	0	1	0	0	1
=	MF	(Brazil)		Moacir	1	0	0	0	0	1
=	DF	(Brazil)	22	Oswaldo	0	0	0	0	1	1
=	FW	(Brazil)		Ruan Carlos	1	0	0	0	0	1
				Own goals	0	0	0	0	0	0
				Total	15	33	5	3	64	120

=== Managers performance ===
Name	From	To	P	W	D	L	GF	GA	Avg%	Ref
(Brazil) Vadão	20 January 2013	6 March 2013	12	5	6	1	21	10	58%	
(Brazil) Gustavo Bueno (c)	10 March 2013		1	1	0	0	2	0	100%	
(Brazil) Sérgio Guedes	13 March 2013	21 May 2013	14	7	3	4	30	17	57%	
(Brazil) Gustavo Bueno (c)	25 May 2013		1	0	0	1	1	2	0%	
(Brazil) Marcelo Martelotte	28 May 2013	7 September 2013	21	11	1	9	34	33	54%	
(Brazil) Neco (c)	10 September 2013		1	0	0	1	2	4	0%	
(Brazil) Geninho	14 September 2013	30 November 2013	19	10	2	7	30	23	56%	

(c) Indicates the caretaker manager

=== Home record ===
Recife	São Lourenço da Mata
Ilha do Retiro	Arena Pernambuco
Capacity: 32,983	Capacity: 44,300
34 matches (24 wins 4 draws 6 losses)	1 match (1 loss)

== Official Competitions ==
=== Copa do Nordeste ===
==== Group stage ====
20 January 2013 1	Sousa	1–1	Sport	Sousa
17:00 (UTC-3)	Leandro Marlon 64'	Report	Roger 88'	Stadium: Estádio Governador Antônio Mariz (Marizão); Attendance: 2,191; Referee: Leandro Saraiva Dantas de Oliveira

24 January 2013 2	Sport	3–1	Confiança	Recife
22:15 (UTC-3)	Reinaldo 77'; Marcos Aurélio 80'; Felipe Menezes 90+2'	Report	Diego Neves 30'	Stadium: Estádio Adelmar da Costa Carvalho (Ilha do Retiro); Attendance: 17,039; Referee: Francisco Carlos do Nascimento

27 January 2013 3	Fortaleza	0–0	Sport	Fortaleza
17:00 (UTC-3)		Report		Stadium: Estádio Governador Plácido Castelo (Castelão); Attendance: 34,249; Referee: Ítalo Medeiros de Azevedo

30 January 2013 4	Sport	3–0	Fortaleza	Recife
22:15 (UTC-3)	Hugo 6'; Marcos Aurélio 25'; Felipe Azevedo 85'	Report		Stadium: Estádio Adelmar da Costa Carvalho (Ilha do Retiro); Attendance: 17,883; Referee: Jaílson Macedo Freitas

3 February 2013 5	Confiança	0–0	Sport	Aracaju
17:00 (UTC-3)		Report		Stadium: Estádio Lourival Baptista (Batistão); Attendance: 7,166; Referee: Arílson Bispo da Anunciação

6 February 2013 6	Sport	6–1	Sousa	Recife
22:15 (UTC-3)	Marcos Aurélio 45+1', 65'; Felipe Menezes 53', 81'; Moacir 62'; Ruan Carlos 87'	Report	Jessui 83'	Stadium: Estádio Adelmar da Costa Carvalho (Ilha do Retiro); Attendance: 11,394; Referee: Francisco Carlos do Nascimento

==== Second stage ====
13 February 2013	Campinense	0–0	Sport	Campina Grande
22:15 (UTC-3)		Report		Stadium: Estádio Governador Ernani Sátyro (Amigão); Attendance: 4,883; Referee: Suelson D França Medeiros

16 February 2013	Sport	2–2	Campinense	Recife
17:00 (UTC-3)	Felipe Azevedo 41', 78'	Report	Bismarck 44'; Zé Paulo 52'	Stadium: Estádio Adelmar da Costa Carvalho (Ilha do Retiro); Attendance: 17,838; Referee: Jaílson Macedo Freitas

==== Record ====
Final Position	Points	Matches	Wins	Draws	Losses	Goals For	Goals Away	Win%
7th	14	8	3	5	0	15	5	58%

=== Campeonato Pernambucano ===
==== Second stage ====
24 February 2013 1	Salgueiro	2–1	Sport	Salgueiro
16:00 (UTC-3)	Clébson 13'; Élvis 37'	Report	Marcos Aurélio 74'	Stadium: Estádio Cornélio de Barros; Attendance: 8,998; Referee: Émerson Sobral

27 February 2013 2	Sport	3–2	Serra Talhada	Recife
20:00 (UTC-3)	Felipe Azevedo; Roger; Marcos Aurélio	Report	Júnior Ferrim; Alex Costa	Stadium: Estádio Adelmar da Costa Carvalho (Ilha do Retiro); Attendance: 7,101; Referee: Emerson Sobral

3 March 2013 3	Central	0–1	Sport	Caruaru
16:00 (UTC-3)		Report	Roger 58'	Stadium: Estádio Luiz José de Lacerda (Lacerdão)

6 March 2013 4	Sport	1–1	Pesqueira	Recife
20:00 (UTC-3)	Gabriel Santos 30'	Report	Jonathan 54'	Stadium: Estádio Adelmar da Costa Carvalho (Ilha do Retiro); Attendance: 9,423; Referee: Giorgio Wilton

10 March 2013 5	Sport	2–0	Porto	Recife
16:00 (UTC-3)	Rithely 39'; Cicinho 84'	Report		Stadium: Estádio Adelmar da Costa Carvalho (Ilha do Retiro); Attendance: 8,902; Referee: Gilberto Freire

13 March 2013 6	Petrolina	0–0	Sport	Petrolina
22:00 (UTC-3)		Report		Stadium: Estádio Municipal Paulo de Souza Coelho; Attendance: 3,980; Referee: Niélson Nogueira Dias

17 March 2013 7	Sport	2–1	Náutico	Recife
16:00 (UTC-3)	Hugo 32'; Felipe Azevedo 81'	Report	Rogério 18'	Stadium: Estádio Adelmar da Costa Carvalho (Ilha do Retiro); Attendance: 18,670; Referee: Sandro Meira Ricci

24 March 2013 8	Ypiranga	2–2	Sport	Santa Cruz do Capibaribe
16:00 (UTC-3)	Jonatas 31'; Elivelton 89'	Report	Roger 59'; Felipe Azevedo 72'	Stadium: Estádio Otávio Limeira Alves; Attendance: 4,356; Referee: Emerson Sobral

27 March 2013 9	Sport	5–0	Chã Grande	Recife
21:50 (UTC-3)	Roger 7', 29'; Cicinho 13'; Felipe Azevedo 75'; Mateus Lima 86'	Report		Stadium: Estádio Adelmar da Costa Carvalho (Ilha do Retiro); Attendance: 7,094; Referee: Gilberto Castro Júnior

6 April 2013 10	Sport	5–1	Belo Jardim	Recife
20:00 (UTC-3)	Lucas Lima 9'; Reinaldo 45+2'; Roger 60'; Mateus Lima 85'; Felipe Azevedo 90+2'	Report	Muller 24'	Stadium: Estádio Adelmar da Costa Carvalho (Ilha do Retiro); Attendance: 11,104; Referee: Giorgio Wilton

14 April 2013 11	Santa Cruz	2–2	Sport	Recife
16:00 (UTC-3)	Raul 43'; Dênis Marques 55'	Report	Roger 50'; Marcos Aurélio 90'	Stadium: Estádio José do Rego Maciel (Arruda); Attendance: 33,063; Referee: Gilberto Castro Júnior

==== Semi-finals ====
21 April 2013	Ypiranga	1–5	Sport	Caruaru
16:00 (UTC-3)	Diogo Silva 12'	Report	Mateus Lima 33'; Tobi 53'; Lucas Lima 58'; Felipe Azevedo 68'; Reinaldo 84'	Stadium: Estádio Luiz José de Lacerda; Attendance: 11,134; Referee: Nielson Nogueira

27 April 2013	Sport	4–2	Ypiranga	Recife
16:00 (UTC-3)	Marcos Aurélio 1', 53'; Felipe Menezes 4'; Reinaldo 86'	Report	Danúbio 28'; Danilo 35'	Stadium: Estádio Adelmar da Costa Carvalho (Ilha do Retiro); Attendance: 14,066; Referee: Tiago Nascimento

==== Finals ====
5 May 2013	Santa Cruz	1–0	Sport	Recife
16:00 (UTC-3)	Dênis Marques 39'	Report		Stadium: Estádio José do Rego Maciel (Arruda); Attendance: 38,201; Referee: Nielson Nogueira Dias

12 May 2013	Sport	0–2	Santa Cruz	Recife
16:00 (UTC-3)		Report	Flávio Caça-Rato 25'; Sandro Manoel 85'	Stadium: Estádio Adelmar da Costa Carvalho (Ilha do Retiro); Attendance: 26,806; Referee: Gilberto Castro Júnior

==== Record ====
Final Position	Points	Matches	Wins	Draws	Losses	Goals For	Goals Away	Win%
2nd	28	15	8	4	3	33	17	62%

=== Copa do Brasil ===
==== First round ====
3 April 2013	Vitória da Conquista	0–1	Sport	Vitória da Conquista
22:00 (UTC-3)		Report	Rithely 43'	Stadium: Estádio Municipal Lomanto Júnior; Attendance: 5,120; Referee: Cláudio Francisco Lima eSilva

17 April 2013	Sport	2–0	Vitória da Conquista	Recife
22:00 (UTC-3)	Marcos Aurélio 45'; Érico Júnior 80'	Report		Stadium: Estádio Adelmar da Costa Carvalho (Ilha do Retiro); Attendance: 2,154; Referee: Dewson Fernando Freitas da Silva

==== Second round ====
8 May 2013	ABC	2–0	Sport	Natal
22:00 (UTC-3)	Jean 56'; Rodrigo Silva 76'	Report		Stadium: Estádio Maria Lamas Farache (Frasqueirão); Attendance: 3,411; Referee: Charles Hebert Cavalcante Ferreira

21 May 2013	Sport	2–3	ABC	Recife
21:00 (UTC-3)	Maurício 2'; Renan Teixeira 41'	Report	Rodrigo Silva 10', 68'; José Rodrigo 84'	Stadium: Estádio Adelmar da Costa Carvalho (Ilha do Retiro); Attendance: 6,262; Referee: Jaílson Macedo Freitas

==== Record ====
Final Position	Points	Matches	Wins	Draws	Losses	Goals For	Goals Away	Win%
34th	6	4	2	0	2	5	5	50%

=== Copa Sudamericana ===
==== First round ====
20 August 2013	Sport (Brazil)	2–0	(Brazil) Náutico	Recife
19:30 (UTC-3)	Felipe Azevedo 5'; Patric 43'	Report		Stadium: Estádio Adelmar da Costa Carvalho (Ilha do Retiro); Attendance: 16,125; Referee: Sandro Meira Ricci (Brazil)

28 August 2013	Náutico (Brazil)	2–0 (1–3 p)	(Brazil) Sport	São Lourenço da Mata
21:50 (UTC-3)	Elicarlos 45+3'; Olivera 64'	Report		Stadium: Estádio Governador Carlos Wilson Campos (Arena Pernambuco); Attendance: 8,320; Referee: Héber Roberto Lopes (Brazil)
	Penalties
	Olivera (penalty missed); Tiago Real (penalty missed); Jonatas Belusso (penalty scored); Rogério (penalty missed)		(penalty scored) Felipe Azevedo; (penalty scored) Marcelo Cordeiro; (penalty scored) Patric

==== Second round ====
25 September 2013	Libertad (Paraguay)	2–0	(Brazil) Sport	Luque
20:50 (UTC-4)	Gómez 10'; P. Benítez 39'	Report		Stadium: Estadio Feliciano Cáceres; Attendance: 5,128; Referee: Saúl Laverni (Argentina)

23 October 2013	Sport (Brazil)	1–2	(Paraguay) Libertad	São Lourenço da Mata
21:10 (UTC-3)	Ailson 47'	Report	J. González 42', 51'	Stadium: Estádio Governador Carlos Wilson Campos (Arena Pernambuco); Attendance: 17,575; Referee: Darío Ubriaco (Uruguay)

==== Record ====
Final Position	Points	Matches	Wins	Draws	Losses	Goals For	Goals Away	Win%
16th	3	4	1	0	3	3	6	25%

=== Série B ===
==== Matches ====
25 May 2013 1	Icasa	2–1	Sport	Juazeiro do Norte
16:20 (UTC-3)	Elanardo 28'; Leandro Pereira 78'	Report	Marcos Aurélio 90+1'	Stadium: Estádio Mauro Sampaio (Romeirão); Attendance: 2,594; Referee: João Bosco Satiro da Nobrega

28 May 2013 2	Sport	1–0	ABC	Recife
19:30 (UTC-3)	Gabriel Santos 47'	Report		Stadium: Estádio Adelmar da Costa Carvalho (Ilha do Retiro); Attendance: 7,367; Referee: Francisco de Assis Almeida Filho

31 May 2013 3	Figueirense	3–2	Sport	Florianópolis
21:50 (UTC-3)	Maylson 4'; Rafael Costa 29', 85'	Report	Gabriel Santos 47'; Rithely 51'	Stadium: Estádio Orlando Scarpelli; Attendance: 5,219; Referee: Leandro Junior Hermes

4 June 2013 4	Guaratinguetá	1–4	Sport	Guaratinguetá
21:50 (UTC-3)	Jonatas Belusso 12'	Report	Marcos Aurélio 47', 63'; Felipe Azevedo 68'; Camilo 90'	Stadium: Estádio Municipal Professor Dario Rodrigues Leite (Ninho da Garça); Attendance: 1,076; Referee: Devarly Lira do Rosario

8 June 2013 5	Sport	1–0	Palmeiras	Recife
16:20 (UTC-3)	Nunes 90+2'	Report		Stadium: Estádio Adelmar da Costa Carvalho (Ilha do Retiro); Attendance: 19,607; Referee: Wagner Reway

11 June 2013 6	Sport	0–2	Bragantino	Recife
19:30 (UTC-3)		Report	Carlinhos 29'; Magno Cruz 57'	Stadium: Estádio Adelmar da Costa Carvalho (Ilha do Retiro); Attendance: 14,785; Referee: Charles Hebert Cavalcante Ferreira

6 July 2013 7	Joinville	2–3	Sport	Joinville
16:20 (UTC-3)	Lima 47', 76'	Report	Camilo 12'; Marcos Aurélio 51'; Renan Teixeira 81'	Stadium: Arena Joinville; Attendance: 10,454; Referee: Rodrigo Batista Raposo

13 July 2013 8	América–RN	2–4	Sport	Ceará-Mirim
16:20 (UTC-3)	Alex 16'; Rodrigo Pimpão 61'	Report	Rithely 33', 76', 78'; Marcos Aurélio 35'	Stadium: Estádio Manoel Dantas Barretto (Barrettão); Attendance: 3,160; Referee: Alício Pena Junior

16 July 2013 9	Sport	2–0	Avaí	Recife
21:00 (UTC-3)	Lucas Lima 20'; Marcos Aurélio 90+2'	Report		Stadium: Estádio Adelmar da Costa Carvalho (Ilha do Retiro); Attendance: 17,160; Referee: Dewson Fernando Freitas da Silva

26 July 2013 10	Sport	2–0	Oeste	Recife
21:00 (UTC-3)	Lucas Lima 35'; Gerson 38'	Report		Stadium: Estádio Adelmar da Costa Carvalho (Ilha do Retiro); Attendance: 17,358; Referee: Pablo Ramon Goncalves Pinheiro

30 July 2013 11	América–MG	5–0	Sport	Belo Horizonte
21:50 (UTC-3)	Rodriguinho 13', 46', 87'; Willians Santana 74'; Leandro 90'	Report		Stadium: Estádio Raimundo Sampaio (Independência); Attendance: 1,428; Referee: Wagner dos Santos Rosa

3 August 2013 12	Sport	1–2	Chapecoense	Recife
16:20 (UTC-3)	Marcos Aurélio 46'	Report	Bruno Rangel 89', 90+2'	Stadium: Estádio Adelmar da Costa Carvalho (Ilha do Retiro); Attendance: 17,548; Referee: Jaílson Macedo Freitas

6 August 2013 13	ASA	2–4	Sport	Arapiraca
19:30 (UTC-3)	Jorginho 24'; Osmar 52'	Report	Marcelo Cordeiro 15'; Marcos Aurélio 65', 67'; Lucas Lima 80'	Stadium: Estádio Municipal Coaracy da Mata Fonseca (Fumeirão); Attendance: 5,537; Referee: Elmo Alves Resende Cunha

10 August 2013 14	São Caetano	2–1	Sport	São Caetano do Sul
16:20 (UTC-3)	Wagner Carioca 1'; Fred 70'	Report	Nunes 77'	Stadium: Estádio Municipal Anacleto Campanella; Attendance: 873; Referee: Célio Amorim

13 August 2013 15	Sport	2–1	Ceará	Recife
19:30 (UTC-3)	Marcos Aurélio 31', 45'	Report	Lulinha 51'	Stadium: Estádio Adelmar da Costa Carvalho (Ilha do Retiro); Attendance: 13,101; Referee: Charles Hebert Cavalcante Ferreira

16 August 2013 16	Sport	3–2	Atlético Goianiense	Recife
21:50 (UTC-3)	Felipe Azevedo 1'; Lucas Lima 20'; Gabriel Santos 60'	Report	Pipico 53', 70'	Stadium: Estádio Adelmar da Costa Carvalho (Ilha do Retiro); Attendance: 11,510; Referee: Vinicius Furlan

24 August 2013 17	Paraná	1–0	Sport	Curitiba
16:20 (UTC-3)	Wellington 69'	Report		Stadium: Estádio Durival Britto e Silva (Vila Capanema); Attendance: 12,295; Referee: Célio Amorim

31 August 2013 18	Sport	2–2	Boa Esporte	Recife
21:00 (UTC-3)	Gabriel Santos 40'; Nunes 90+1'	Report	Rafinha 19'; Francismar 72'	Stadium: Estádio Adelmar da Costa Carvalho (Ilha do Retiro); Attendance: 10,891; Referee: Avelar Rodrigo da Silva

3 September 2013 19	Paysandu	2–0	Sport	Belém
21:50 (UTC-3)	Marcelo Nicácio 8'; Yago Pikachu 78'	Report		Stadium: Estádio Leônidas Sodré de Castro (Curuzu); Attendance: 9,127; Referee: Raphael Claus

7 September 2013 20	Sport	0–2	Icasa	Recife
21:00 (UTC-3)		Report	Juninho Potiguar 25'; Neilson 40'	Stadium: Estádio Adelmar da Costa Carvalho (Ilha do Retiro); Attendance: 10,095; Referee: Antônio Dib Moraes de Sousa

10 September 2013 21	ABC	4–2	Sport	Natal,
19:30 (UTC-3)	Edson 47'; Rodrigo Silva 62'; Alvinho 75'; Pingo 78'	Report	Marcos Aurélio 53'; Lucas Lima 76'	Stadium: Estádio Maria Lamas Farache (Frasqueirão); Attendance: 2,706; Referee: Antônio Neuriclaudio R. Costa

14 September 2013 22	Sport	1–0	Figueirense	Recife
16:20 (UTC-3)	Felipe Azevedo 29'	Report		Stadium: Estádio Adelmar da Costa Carvalho (Ilha do Retiro); Attendance: 10,671; Referee: Francisco de Assis Almeida Filho

17 September 2013 23	Sport	1–0	Guaratinguetá	Recife
19:30 (UTC-3)	Ailton 68'	Report		Stadium: Estádio Adelmar da Costa Carvalho (Ilha do Retiro); Attendance: 10,389; Referee: Rodrigo Batista Raposo

21 September 2013 24	Palmeiras	2–1	Sport	São Paulo
16:20 (UTC-3)	Wesley 1', 54'	Report	Rithely 81'	Stadium: Estádio Municipal Paulo Machado de Carvalho (Pacaembu); Attendance: 21,054; Referee: Célio Amorim

28 September 2013 25	Bragantino	1–2	Sport	Bragança Paulista
16:20 (UTC-3)	Lincom 10'	Report	Oswaldo 14'; Lucas Lima 82'	Stadium: Estádio Nabi Abi Chedid; Attendance: 1,125; Referee: Arílson Bispo da Anunciação

1 October 2013 26	Sport	3–2	Joinville	Recife
19:30 (UTC-3)	Marcos Aurélio 27', 70'; Patric 61'	Report	Lima 20'; Marcelo Costa 84'	Stadium: Estádio Adelmar da Costa Carvalho (Ilha do Retiro); Attendance: 16,046; Referee: Grazianni Maciel Rocha

4 October 2013 27	Sport	3–0	América–RN	Recife
19:30 (UTC-3)	Gerson 17'; Neto Baiano 68'; Lucas Lima 69'	Report		Stadium: Estádio Adelmar da Costa Carvalho (Ilha do Retiro); Attendance: 14,423; Referee: Wagner do Nascimento Magalhães

8 October 2013 28	Avaí	1–0	Sport	Florianópolis
21:50 (UTC-3)	Márcio Diogo 71'	Report		Stadium: Estádio Aderbal Ramos da Silva (Ressacada); Attendance: 11,019; Referee: Rodrigo Nunes de Sá

12 October 2013 29	Oeste	0–3	Sport	Itápolis
16:20 (UTC-3)		Report	Marcos Aurélio 69', 74'; Marcelo Cordeiro 80'	Stadium: Estádio Municipal dos Amaros; Attendance: 2,117; Referee: Fabrício Neves Correa

15 October 2013 30	Sport	1–3	América Mineiro	Recife
19:30 (UTC-3)	Marcos Aurélio 14'	Report	Elsinho 37'; Bady 79', 86'	Stadium: Estádio Adelmar da Costa Carvalho (Ilha do Retiro); Attendance: 16,694; Referee: Flávio Rodrigues Guerra

19 October 2013 31	Chapecoense	0–0	Sport	Chapecó
16:20 (UTC-3)		Report		Stadium: Arena Condá; Attendance: 9,710; Referee: Dewson Fernando Freitas da Silva

26 October 2013 32	Sport	4–2	ASA	Recife
16:20 (UTC-3)	Neto Baiano 9', 40'; Patric 42'; Marcos Aurélio 87'	Report	Lúcio Maranhão 60'; Caique Valdivia 68'	Stadium: Estádio Adelmar da Costa Carvalho (Ilha do Retiro); Attendance: 22,099; Referee: Wagner Reway

2 November 2013 33	Sport	3–0	São Caetano	Recife
17:20 (UTC-3)	Neto Baiano 17', 55'; Marcos Aurélio 90+1'	Report		Stadium: Estádio Adelmar da Costa Carvalho (Ilha do Retiro); Attendance: 21,692; Referee: Marcos Andre Gomes da Penha

9 November 2013 34	Ceará	4–1	Sport	Fortaleza
17:20 (UTC-3)	Ricardinho 3'; Lulinha 60'; Mota 77'; Léo Gamalho 90+1'	Report	Marcos Aurélio 32'	Stadium: Estádio Governador Plácido Castelo (Castelão); Attendance: 21,077; Referee: Marcelo de Lima Henrique

12 November 2013 35	Atlético Goianiense	2–1	Sport	Goiânia
21:50 (UTC-3)	Diego Giaretta 33'; Anselmo 46'	Report	Patric 44'	Stadium: Estádio do Governo do Estado de Goiás (Serra Dourada); Attendance: 1,005; Referee: Dewson Fernando Freitas da Silva

16 November 2013 36	Sport	2–0	Paraná	Recife
17:20 (UTC-3)	Camilo 23'; Neto Baiano 63'	Report		Stadium: Estádio Adelmar da Costa Carvalho (Ilha do Retiro); Attendance: 19,545; Referee: Paulo César de Oliveira

23 November 2013 37	Boa Esporte	2–3	Sport	Varginha
17:20 (UTC-3)	Éder Lima 48'; Luiz Paulo 64'	Report	Marcos Aurélio 17', 42'; Neto Baiano 21'	Stadium: Estádio Municipal Prefeito Dilson Luiz de Melo (Melão); Attendance: 752; Referee: Raphael Claus

30 November 2013 38	Sport	0–0	Paysandu	Recife
16:20 (UTC-3)		Report		Stadium: Estádio Adelmar da Costa Carvalho (Ilha do Retiro); Attendance: 27,054; Referee: Francisco de Assis Almeida Filho

==== Record ====
Final Position	Points	Matches	Wins	Draws	Losses	Goals For	Goals Away	Win%
3rd	63	38	20	3	15	64	56	55%
