= 2012 Sport Club do Recife season =

Sport Recife
2012 season
- Chairman: Gustavo Dubeux
- Manager: Mazola Júnior; Gustavo Bueno (c); Vágner Mancini; Waldemar Lemos; Sérgio Guedes
- Stadium: Ilha do Retiro
- Série A: 17th
- Pernambucano: Runners-up
- Copa do Brasil: Second round
- Top goalscorer: League: Hugo (8); All: Marcelinho Paraíba (15)
Home colours	Away colours	Third colours

The 2012 season was Sport Recife's 108th season in the club's history. Sport competed in the Campeonato Pernambucano., Série A and Copa do Brasil.

== Final squad ==
Note: Flags indicate national team as defined under FIFA eligibility rules; some limited exceptions apply. Players may hold more than one non-FIFA nationality.

No.	Pos.	Nation	Player
1	GK	BRA	Magrão
3	DF	BRA	Bruno Aguiar
4	DF	BRA	Edcarlos
5	DF	BRA	Tobi
6	DF	BRA	Reinaldo
7	FW	BRA	Henrique
9	FW	BRA	Gilberto
10	FW	BRA	Marquinhos Gabriel
11	FW	BRA	Felipe Azevedo
12	DF	BRA	Cicinho
13	DF	BRA	Ailson
14	DF	BRA	Diego Ivo
15	MF	BRA	Renan Teixeira
16	MF	BRA	Felipe Menezes
17	FW	BRA	Willians
18	MF	BRA	Milton Júnior

No.	Pos.	Nation	Player
19	FW	BRA	Roberson
20	MF	BRA	Rivaldo
21	MF	BRA	Rithely
22	DF	BRA	Renato
23	MF	BRA	Naldinho
25	FW	BRA	Gilsinho
26	DF	BRA	Renê
27	FW	BRA	Ruan
28	DF	BRA	Moacir
31	MF	BRA	Lenon
32	GK	BRA	Matheus Cavichioli
34	MF	BRA	Diogo Barcellos
36	DF	BRA	Willian Rocha
80	MF	BRA	Hugo
87	GK	BRA	Saulo
??	GK	BRA	Silézio
??	MF	BRA	Welton

== Statistics ==
=== Overall ===
Games played	67 (26 Pernambucano, 3 Copa do Brasil, 38 Série A)
Games won	27 (16 Pernambucano, 1 Copa do Brasil, 10 Série A)
Games drawn	18 (7 Pernambucano, 0 Copa do Brasil, 11 Série A)
Games lost	22 (3 Pernambucano, 2 Copa do Brasil, 17 Série A)
Goals scored	91
Goals conceded	88
Goal difference	+3
Best results (goal difference)	5–0 (H) v Serra Talhada - Pernambucano - 2012.03.31
Worst result (goal difference)	1–5 (A) v Portuguesa - Série A - 2012.10.04
Top scorer	Marcelinho Paraíba (15)

Source: Sport Recife official website

=== Goalscorers ===
Place	Pos.	Nat.	No.	Name	Campeonato Pernambucano	Copa do Brasil	Série A	Total
1	MF	(Brazil)	10	Marcelinho Paraíba	14	1	0	15
2	MF	(Brazil)	80	Hugo	0	0	8	8
3	FW	(Brazil)	11	Felipe Azevedo	0	0	7	7
3	FW	(Brazil)	9	Gilberto	0	0	7	7
4	FW	(Brazil)	18	Jheimy	6	0	0	6
5	DF	(Brazil)	3	Bruno Aguiar	3	1	1	5
5	FW	(Brazil)	9	Jael	4	1	0	5
5	MF	(Brazil)	6	Marquinhos Gabriel	1	0	4	5
6	FW	(Brazil)	7	Henrique	0	0	4	4
6	DF	(Brazil)	5	Tobi	3	0	1	4
7	MF	(Brazil)	21	Rithely	0	0	3	3
7	MF	(Brazil)	17	Willians	3	0	0	3
8	FW	(Brazil)	25	Gilsinho	0	0	2	2
8	MF	(Brazil)	18	Milton Júnior	2	0	0	2
8	DF	(Brazil)	22	Renato	1	1	0	2
8	MF	(Brazil)	20	Rivaldo	1	0	1	2
8	FW	(Brazil)	19	Roberson	2	0	0	2
8	MF	(Brazil)	27	Ruan	2	0	0	2
8	DF	(Brazil)	36	Willian Rocha	2	0	0	2
9	DF	(Brazil)	4	Edcarlos	1	0	0	1
9	MF	(Brazil)	8	Marquinhos Paraná	0	0	1	1
9	DF	(Brazil)	28	Moacir	1	0	0	1
9	DF	(Brazil)	26	Renê	1	0	0	1
				Own goals	1	0	0	1
				Total	48	4	39	91

=== Managers performance ===
Name	From	To	P	W	D	L	GF	GA	Avg%	Ref
(Brazil) Mazola Júnior	15 January 2012	13 May 2012	29	17	7	5	52	32	66%	
(Brazil) Gustavo Bueno (c)	19 May 2012		1	0	1	0	1	1	33%	
(Brazil) Vagner Mancini	26 May 2012	11 August 2012	15	3	4	8	12	22	28%	
(Brazil) Gustavo Bueno (c)	15 August 2012	18 August 2012	2	0	0	2	0	3	0%	
(Brazil) Waldemar Lemos	26 August 2012	4 October 2012	10	3	4	3	11	17	43%	
(Brazil) Sérgio Guedes	11 October 2012	2 December 2012	10	4	2	4	15	13	46%	

(c) Indicates the caretaker manager

== Official Competitions ==
=== Campeonato Pernambucano ===
==== First stage ====
15 January 2012 1	Araripina	1–1	Sport	Araripina
16:00 (UTC-3)	Wanderley 39'	Report	Renato 73'	Stadium: Estádio Gilson Tiburtino de Souza (Chapadão do Araripe); Attendance: 6,360; Referee: Nielson Nogueira

19 January 2012 2	Sport	0–0	América–PE	Recife
21:00 (UTC-3)		Report		Stadium: Estádio Adelmar da Costa Carvalho (Ilha do Retiro)

23 January 2012 3	Sport	2–1	Petrolina	Recife
21:00 (UTC-3)	Marcelinho Paraíba 6'; Jheimy 88'	Report	Giovani 79'	Stadium: Estádio Adelmar da Costa Carvalho (Ilha do Retiro); Attendance: Gilberto Castro Júnior; Referee: 12,018

26 January 2012 4	Belo Jardim	0–3	Sport	Belo Jardim
20:00 (UTC-3)		Report	Jheimy 13'; Marquinhos Gabriel 49'; Willian Rocha 73'	Stadium: Estádio José Bezerra de Mendonça; Referee: Ricardo Tavares

29 January 2012 5	Sport	4–3	Náutico	Recife
16:00 (UTC-3)	Roberson 6', 13'; Willian Rocha 12'; Tobi 60'	Report	Souza 27'; Jefferson 74'; Lenon 85'	Stadium: Estádio Adelmar da Costa Carvalho (Ilha do Retiro); Attendance: 24,617; Referee: Gleydson Leite

1 February 2012 6	Salgueiro	2–0	Sport	Salgueiro
21:00 (UTC-3)	Fabrício Ceará 54', 78'	Report		Stadium: Estádio Cornélio de Barros; Attendance: 9,044; Referee: Niélson Nogueira

5 February 2012 7	Serra Talhada	1–2	Sport	Serra Talhada
16:00 (UTC-3)	Kássio 75' (pen.)	Report	Renê 53'; Marcelinho Paraíba 69' (pen.)	Stadium: Estádio Nildo Pereira de Menezes

8 February 2012 8	Sport	0–1	Ypiranga–PE	Recife
21:15 (UTC-3)		Report	Adelino 90+4'	Stadium: Estádio Adelmar da Costa Carvalho (Ilha do Retiro)

11 February 2012 9	Sport	4–2	Porto	Recife
18:00 (UTC-3)	Aílton 33' (o.g.); Marcelinho Paraíba 72', 84' (pen.), pen.'	Report	Kiros 25'; Joélson 29'	Stadium: Estádio Adelmar da Costa Carvalho (Ilha do Retiro); Attendance: 13,038; Referee: Niélson Nogueira

16 February 2012 10	Santa Cruz	1–3	Sport	Recife
20:00 (UTC-3)	André Oliveira 90+2'	Report	Jheimy 43'; Marcelinho Paraíba 66'; Milton Júnior 90'	Stadium: Estádio José do Rego Maciel (Arruda); Attendance: 45,109; Referee: Ricardo Tavares

23 February 2012 11	Sport	2–1	Central	Recife
20:00 (UTC-3)	Rivaldo 22'; Jael 48'	Report	Valdson 54'	Stadium: Estádio Adelmar da Costa Carvalho (Ilha do Retiro); Referee: Ricardo Jorge

26 February 2012 12	Central	1–1	Sport	Caruaru
16:00 (UTC-3)	Valdson 40'	Report	Jael 72'	Stadium: Estádio Luiz José de Lacerda (Lacerdão); Attendance: 12,653; Referee: Neilson Santos

29 February 2012 13	Sport	3–2	Belo Jardim	Recife
20:00 (UTC-3)	Marcelinho Paraíba 50'; Tobi 51'; Willians 76'	Report	Laércio 55'; Fernadinho 58'	Stadium: Estádio Adelmar da Costa Carvalho (Ilha do Retiro); Attendance: 15,345; Referee: Ricardo Tavares

4 March 2012 14	Petrolina	0–1	Sport	Petrolina
16:00 (UTC-3)		Report	Jael 89'	Stadium: Estádio Paulo de Souza Coelho

7 March 2012 15	Sport	2–1	Araripina	Recife
20:00 (UTC-3)	Marcelinho Paraíba 29', 57'	Report	Cristiano	Stadium: Estádio Adelmar da Costa Carvalho (Ilha do Retiro); Attendance: 13,376; Referee: Ricardo Jorge

10 March 2012 16	América–PE	2–4	Sport	Paulista
19:00 (UTC-3)	Flávio Barros; Léo Gama	Report	Bruno Aguiar; Tobi; Willians; Marcelinho Paraíba	Stadium: Estádio Ademir Cunha; Attendance: 10,498; Referee: Nielson Nogueiro

17 March 2012 17	Sport	0–0	Salgueiro	Recife
19:00 (UTC-3)		Report		Stadium: Estádio Adelmar da Costa Carvalho (Ilha do Retiro)

25 March 2012 18	Náutico	0–0	Sport	Recife
16:00 (UTC-3)		Report		Stadium: Estádio Eládio de Barros Carvalho (Aflitos); Referee: Sandro Meira Ricci

28 March 2012 19	Ypiranga–PE	1–2	Sport	Santa Cruz do Capibaribe
20:00 (UTC-3)	Danilo Lins 90'	Report	Willians 68'; Jheimy 76'	Stadium: Estádio Otávio Limeira Alves; Referee: Gleydson Leite

31 March 2012 20	Sport	5–0	Serra Talhada	Recife
19:00 (UTC-3)	Marcelinho Paraíba 9', 61'; Jael 65'; Ruan 76'; Jheimy 81'	Report		Stadium: Estádio Adelmar da Costa Carvalho (Ilha do Retiro); Attendance: 15,733

8 April 2012 21	Porto	1–3	Sport	Caruaru
16:00 (UTC-3)	Baiano 74'	Report	Jheimy 3'; Ruan 43' (pen.); Milton Júnior 84'	Stadium: Estádio Luiz José de Lacerda (Lacerdão)

15 April 2012 22	Sport	2–1	Santa Cruz	Recife
19:00 (UTC-3)	Bruno Aguiar 37', 51'	Report	Flávio Caça-Rato 62'	Stadium: Estádio Adelmar da Costa Carvalho (Ilha do Retiro); Attendance: 20,008; Referee: Neilson Santos

==== Semi-finals ====
22 April 2012	Náutico	1–2	Sport	Recife
16:00 (UTC-3)	Ronaldo Alves 31'	Report	Marcelinho Paraíba 23', 81' (pen.)	Stadium: Estádio Eládio de Barros Carvalho (Aflitos); Attendance: 12,644; Referee: Ricardo Tavares

29 April 2012	Sport	0–0	Náutico	Recife
16:00 (UTC-3)		Report		Stadium: Estádio Adelmar da Costa Carvalho (Ilha do Retiro); Attendance: 19,026; Referee: Sandro Meira Ricci

==== Finals ====
6 May 2012	Santa Cruz	0–0	Sport	Recife
16:00 (UTC-3)		Report		Stadium: Estádio José do Rego Maciel (Arruda); Referee: Neílson Santos

13 May 2012	Sport	2–3	Santa Cruz	Recife
16:00 (UTC-3)	Moacir 13'; Edcarlos 80'	Report	Branquinho 12'; Dênis Marques 40'; Luciano Henrique 74'	Stadium: Estádio Adelmar da Costa Carvalho (Ilha do Retiro); Attendance: 31,998; Referee: Sandro Meira Ricci

==== Record ====
Final Position	Points	Matches	Wins	Draws	Losses	Goals For	Goals Away	Win%
2nd	55	26	16	7	3	48	26	70%

=== Copa do Brasil ===
==== First round ====
14 March 2012	4 de Julho	0–2	Sport	Teresina
22:00 (UTC-3)		Report	Marcelinho Paraíba 37'; Renato 45+2'	Stadium: Estádio Governador Alberto Tavares Silva (Albertão); Attendance: 2,528; Referee: Mayron dos Reis Novais

==== Second round ====
4 April 2012	Paysandu	2–1	Sport	Recife
21:50 (UTC-3)	Yago Pikachu 14'; Adriano Magrão 53'	Report	Jael 45'	Stadium: Estádio Adelmar da Costa Carvalho (Ilha do Retiro); Attendance: 7,702; Referee: Wilson Luiz Seneme

11 April 2012	Sport	1–4	Paysandu	Recife
21:50 (UTC-3)	Bruno Aguiar 66'	Report	Yago Pikachu 60'; Heliton 63', 85'; Rafael Oliveira 90'	Stadium: Estádio Adelmar da Costa Carvalho (Ilha do Retiro); Attendance: 14,933; Referee: Paulo César Oliveira

==== Record ====
Final Position	Points	Matches	Wins	Draws	Losses	Goals For	Goals Away	Win%
27th	3	3	1	0	2	4	6	33%

=== Série A ===
==== Matches ====
19 May 2012 1	Sport	1–1	Flamengo	Recife
18:30 (UTC-3)	Marquinhos Gabriel 57'	Report	Vágner Love 73'	Stadium: Estádio Adelmar da Costa Carvalho (Ilha do Retiro); Attendance: 26,699; Referee: Paulo César de Oliveira

26 May 2012 2	Santos	0–0	Sport	Santos
(UTC-3)		Report		Stadium: Estádio Urbano Caldeira (Vila Belmiro); Attendance: 5,294; Referee: Márcio Chagas da Silva

6 June 2012 3	Sport	2–1	Palmeiras	Recife
19:30 (UTC-3)	Marquinhos Paraná 14'; Felipe Azevedo 71'	Report	Barcos 37'	Stadium: Estádio Adelmar da Costa Carvalho (Ilha do Retiro); Attendance: 19,096; Referee: Leandro Vuaden

9 June 2012 4	Cruzeiro	1–0	Sport	Varginha
18:30 (UTC-3)	Wellington Paulista 70' (pen.)	Report		Stadium: Estádio Municipal Prefeito Dilson Luiz de Melo (Melão); Attendance: 4,574; Referee: Raphael Claus

16 June 2012 5	Bahia	2–1	Sport	Salvador
16:00 (UTC-3)	Elias 14'; Fahel 85'	Report	Bruno Aguiar 69'	Stadium: Estádio Governador Roberto Santos (Pituaçu); Attendance: 11,031; Referee: Guilherme Ceretta de Lima

24 June 2012 6	Sport	0–2	Internacional	Recife
18:30 (UTC-3)		Report	Bruno Aguiar 13' (o.g.); Leandro Damião 38'	Stadium: Estádio Adelmar da Costa Carvalho (Ilha do Retiro); Attendance: 13.531; Referee: Marcelo de Lima Henrique

1 July 2012 7	Coritiba	2–3	Sport	Curitiba
16:00 (UTC-3)	Anderson Aquino 12'; Tcheco 24'	Report	Henrique 36'; Marquinhos Gabriel 75'; Felipe Azevedo 86'	Stadium: Estádio Major Antônio (Couto Pereira); Attendance: 12,447; Referee: Wilson Luiz Seneme

8 July 2012 8	Sport	1–1	Corinthians	Recife
18:30 (UTC-3)	Marquinhos Gabriel 89'	Report	Liédson 74'	Stadium: Estádio Adelmar da Costa Carvalho (Ilha do Retiro); Attendance: 20,976; Referee: Péricles Bassols Cortez

15 July 2012 9	Sport	2–1	Portuguesa	Recife
18:30 (UTC-3)	Henrique 15'; Gilberto 68'	Report	Moisés 71'	Stadium: Estádio Adelmar da Costa Carvalho (Ilha do Retiro); Attendance: 15,770; Referee: Evandro Rogério Roman

18 July 2012 10	Grêmio	3–1	Sport	Porto Alegre
19:30 (UTC-3)	Marcelo Moreno 63'; Leandro 72', 79'	Report	Felipe Azevedo 38'	Stadium: Estádio Olímpico Monumental; Attendance: 15,179; Referee: Jailson Macedo Freitas

21 July 2012 11	Sport	1–4	Atlético Mineiro	Recife
18:30 (UTC-3)	Gilberto 25'	Report	31'; Ronaldinho Gaúcho 59'; Jô 64'; Bernard 72'	Stadium: Estádio Adelmar da Costa Carvalho (Ilha do Retiro); Attendance: 16,230; Referee: Paulo César de Oliveira

25 July 2012 12	Ponte Preta	1–1	Sport	Campinas
19:30 (UTC-3)	André Luís 6'	Report	Marquinhos Gabriel 21'	Stadium: Estádio Moisés Lucarelli; Attendance: 4,117; Referee: Héber Roberto Lopes

29 July 2012 13	Sport	0–0	Atlético Goianiense	Recife
16:00 (UTC-3)		Report		Stadium: Estádio Adelmar da Costa Carvalho (Ilha do Retiro); Attendance: 12,860; Referee: Wagner Reway

5 August 2012 14	São Paulo	1–0	Sport	São Paulo
16:00 (UTC-3)	Ademilson 78'	Report		Stadium: Estádio Cícero Pompeu de Toledo (Morumbi); Attendance: 23,492; Referee: André Luiz de Freitas

8 August 2012 15	Sport	0–2	Vasco da Gama	Recife
19:30 (UTC-3)		Report	Juninho Pernambucano 67'; Tenorio 84'	Stadium: Estádio Adelmar da Costa Carvalho (Ilha do Retiro); Attendance: 13,786; Referee: Guilherme Ceretta de Lima

11 August 2012 16	Sport	0–1	Figueirense	Recife
18:30 (UTC-3)		Report	Aloísio 55'	Stadium: Estádio Adelmar da Costa Carvalho (Ilha do Retiro); Attendance: 11,258; Referee: Edivaldo Elias da Silva

15 August 2012 17	Botafogo	2–0	Sport	Rio de Janeiro
21:50 (UTC-3)	Elkeson 66'; Seedorf 71'	Report		Stadium: Estádio Olímpico Nilton Santos (Engenhão); Attendance: 2,457; Referee: Antônio Rogério do Prado

18 August 2012 18	Fluminense	1–0	Sport	Volta Redonda
18:30 (UTC-3)	Samuel 82'	Report		Stadium: Estádio Municipal General Sylvio Raulino de Oliveira; Attendance: 5,293; Referee: Leandro Vuaden

26 August 2012 19	Sport	0–0	Náutico	Recife
18:30 (UTC-3)		Report		Stadium: Estádio Adelmar da Costa Carvalho (Ilha do Retiro); Attendance: 17,066; Referee: Sandro Meira Ricci

30 August 2012 20	Flamengo	1–1	Sport	Volta Redonda
21:00 (UTC-3)	Ibson 12'	Report	Felipe Azevedo 19'	Stadium: Estádio Municipal General Sylvio Raulino de Oliveira; Attendance: 6,035; Referee: Ricardo Marques Ribeiro

2 September 2012 21	Sport	2–1	Santos	Recife
16:00 (UTC-3)	Hugo 3'; Felipe Azevedo 36'	Report	André 51'	Stadium: Estádio Adelmar da Costa Carvalho (Ilha do Retiro); Attendance: 20,171; Referee: Francisco Carlos do Nascimento

6 September 2012 22	Palmeiras	3–1	Sport	São Paulo
21:00 (UTC-3)	Carlos Corrêa 52'; Tiago Real 63'; Obina 67'	Report	Rivaldo 61'	Stadium: Estádio Municipal Paulo Machado de Carvalho (Pacaembu); Attendance: 29,409; Referee: Marcelo de Lima Henrique

9 September 2012 23	Sport	2–1	Cruzeiro	Recife
18:30 (UTC-3)	Rithely 30'; Gilberto 61'	Report	Wallyson 8'	Stadium: Estádio Adelmar da Costa Carvalho (Ilha do Retiro); Attendance: 13,562; Referee: André Luiz de Freitas

12 September 2012 24	Sport	1–1	Bahia	Recife
20:30 (UTC-3)	Hugo 4'	Report	Hélder 82'	Stadium: Estádio Adelmar da Costa Carvalho (Ilha do Retiro); Attendance: 19,089; Referee: Luiz Flávio de Oliveira

16 September 2012 25	Internacional	2–2	Sport	Porto Alegre
18:30 (UTC-3)	Cassiano 62'; Leandro Damião 75'	Report	Rithely 35'; Gilsinho 41'	Stadium: Estádio José Pinheiro Borda (Beira-Rio); Attendance: 4,481; Referee: Héber Roberto Lopes

23 September 2012 26	Sport	1–0	Coritiba	Recife
18:30 (UTC-3)	Gilberto 90+2' (pen.)	Report		Stadium: Estádio Adelmar da Costa Carvalho (Ilha do Retiro); Attendance: 15,258; Referee: Leandro Vuaden

30 September 2012 27	Corinthians	3–0	Sport	São Paulo
16:00 (UTC-3)	Paulinho 54', 84'; Romarinho 70'	Report		Stadium: Estádio Municipal Paulo Machado de Carvalho (Pacaembu); Attendance: 25,277; Referee: Jean Pierre Gonçalves

4 October 2012 28	Portuguesa	5–1	Sport	São Paulo
21:00 (UTC-3)	Bruno Mineiro 24', 47', 66'; Moisés 81'; Rodriguinho 90'	Report	Hugo 15'	Stadium: Estádio Oswaldo Teixeira Duarte (Canindé); Attendance: 2,054; Referee: Ricardo Marques Ribeiro

11 October 2012 29	Sport	1–3	Grêmio	Recife
21:00 (UTC-3)	Hugo 79' (pen.)	Report	Anderson Pico 43'; Leandro 51'; Marquinhos 56'	Stadium: Estádio Adelmar da Costa Carvalho (Ilha do Retiro); Attendance: 11,210; Referee: Francisco Carlos Nascimento

14 October 2012 30	Atlético Mineiro	2–1	Sport	Belo Horizonte
16:00 (UTC-3)	Leonardo 75', 90+1'	Report	Hugo 15'	Stadium: Estádio Raimundo Sampaio (Independência); Attendance: 14,265; Referee: Flávio Rodrigues Guerra

18 October 2012 31	Sport	3–1	Ponte Preta	Recife
21:00 (UTC-3)	Rithely 32'; Tobi 38'; Gilsinho 80'	Report	Giancarlo 45+1'	Stadium: Estádio Adelmar da Costa Carvalho (Ilha do Retiro); Attendance: 10,280; Referee: Wilton Pereira Sampaio

21 October 2012 32	Atlético Goianiense	0–1	Sport	Goiânia
18:30 (UTC-3)		Report	Hugo 48'	Stadium: Estádio do Governo do Estado de Goiás (Serra Dourada); Attendance: 449; Referee: Péricles Bassols Cortez

27 October 2012 33	Sport	2–4	São Paulo	Recife
18:30 (UTC-3)	Gilberto 13'; Hugo 79' (pen.)	Report	Lucas 17', 29', 58'; Rivaldo 33' (o.g.)	Stadium: Estádio Adelmar da Costa Carvalho (Ilha do Retiro); Attendance: 29,590; Referee: Jailson Macedo Freitas

4 November 2012 34	Vasco da Gama	0–3	Sport	Rio de Janeiro
17:00 (UTC-3)		Report	Felipe Azevedo 39'; Hugo 52'; Henrique 86'	Stadium: Estádio Vasco da Gama (São Januário); Attendance: 6,569; Referee: Márcio Chagas da Silva

11 November 2012 35	Figueirense	1–1	Sport	Florianópolis
19:30 (UTC-3)	Júlio César 63'	Report	Gilberto 23'	Stadium: Estádio Orlando Scarpelli; Attendance: 2,869; Referee: Héber Roberto Lopes

18 November 2012 36	Sport	2–0	Botafogo	Recife
19:30 (UTC-3)	Gilberto 58'; Henrique 89'	Report		Stadium: Estádio Adelmar da Costa Carvalho (Ilha do Retiro); Attendance: 22,951; Referee: Ricardo Marques Ribeiro

25 November 2012 37	Sport	1–1	Fluminense	Recife
17:00 (UTC-3)	Felipe Azevedo 45+3'	Report	Fred 27'	Stadium: Estádio Adelmar da Costa Carvalho (Ilha do Retiro); Attendance: 32,408; Referee: André Luiz de Freitas

2 December 2012 38	Náutico	1–0	Sport	Recife
17:00 (UTC-3)	Araújo 64'	Report		Stadium: Estádio Eládio de Barros Carvalho (Aflitos); Referee: Marcelo de Lima Henrique

==== Record ====
Final Position	Points	Matches	Wins	Draws	Losses	Goals For	Goals Away	Win%
17th	41	38	10	11	17	39	56	35%
