= Ruan Carlos =

Brazilian footballer

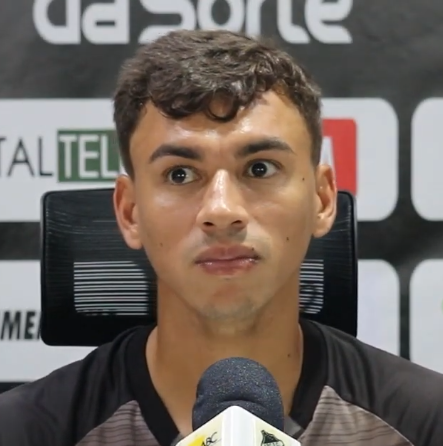
- Ruan in 2024

Personal information
- Full name: Ruan Carlos Gomes Costa da Silva
- Date of birth: 17 August 1993 (age 33)
- Place of birth: Natal, Brazil
- Height: 1.79 m (5 ft 10 in)
- Position: Forward

Youth career
- Sport Recife
- 2011–2012: → Grêmio (loan)

Senior career*
Years	Team	Apps	(Gls)
2010–2015	Sport Recife	23	(2)
2013	→ Fortaleza (loan)	16	(6)
2014	→ Internacional (loan)	2	(0)
2014	→ Paysandu (loan)	13	(6)
2015	→ Goiás (loan)	19	(3)
2016	Ituano	13	(2)
2016	→ Paysandu (loan)	3	(0)
2016	Botafogo-PB	1	(0)
2017	Vila Nova	11	(1)
2018	CRB	8	(0)
2018	Remo	4	(0)
2019	Caxias	16	(0)
2020–2021	São Bento	34	(5)
2021–2022	Atibaia	5	(0)
2022–2023	Amazonas	38	(3)
2022	→ Laguna (loan)	5	(1)
2024	ABC	25	(2)
2025	Floresta	22	(6)
2026	São José-SP	5	(0)
- * Club domestic league appearances and goals as of 20:49, 29 April 2026 (UTC)

Ruan Carlos Gomes Costa da Silva (born 17 August 1993), known as Ruan Carlos or just Ruan, is a Brazilian footballer who plays as a forward.

== Career ==
Born in Natal, Rio Grande do Norte, Ruan was a Sport Recife youth graduate. He made his first team debut on 11 September 2010, coming on as a late substitute for Wilson in a 1–0 Série B away win over Americana.

On 24 August 2011, Ruan was loaned to Grêmio and was assigned to the under-20 team. Back to his parent club the following 19 March, he scored his first senior goal on 31 March 2012, netting Sport's fourth in a 5–0 Campeonato Pernambucano home routing of Serra Talhada.

On 6 May 2013, Ruan was loaned to Série C side Fortaleza. He began the 2014 season at Internacional, although mainly with the under-23 team, before moving to Paysandu, where he scored the goal which sealed the club's promotion to the Série B.

On 3 January 2015, Ruan agreed to a deal with Goiás in the Série A. On 28 December, he signed for Ituano, before returning to Paysandu on 2 May 2016.

On 16 August 2016, after being rarely used at Papão, Ruan joined Botafogo-PB. After featuring in just one match, he moved to Vila Nova on 21 December, but was also rarely used.

On 13 December 2017, Ruan was one of the ten signings announced by CRB, but moved to Paysandu's rivals Remo the following 27 May. He played the 2019 campaign at Caxias, and signed for São Bento on 7 December of that year.

In 2021, Ruan joined Atibaia for the year's Copa Paulista. He signed for Amazonas on 21 April 2022, He also scored the goal which sealed the latter club's promotion in August, and subsequently spent a short period on loan at Laguna.

On 4 December 2023, after another promotion, Ruan left Amazonas and moved to ABC. On 8 January 2025, he was announced at fellow third division side Floresta.

On 5 December 2025, São José-SP announced the signing of Ruan for the upcoming season.

== Career statistics ==
As of 29 April 2026

Club	Season	League			State League		Cup		Continental		Other		Total	
Club	Season	Division	Apps	Goals	Apps	Goals	Apps	Goals	Apps	Goals	Apps	Goals	Apps	Goals
Sport Recife	2010	Série B	4	0	—		—		—		—		4	0
Sport Recife	2011	Série B	2	0	9	0	1	0	—		—		12	0
Sport Recife	2012	Série A	2	0	5	2	1	0	—		—		8	2
Sport Recife	2013	Série B	—		1	0	—		—		5 (Note: Appearance(s) in Copa do Nordeste)	1	6	1
Sport Recife	Total		8	0	15	2	2	0	—		5	1	30	3
Fortaleza (loan)	2013	Série C	16	6	—		3	0	—		—		19	6
Paysandu (loan)	2014	Série A	—		2	0	—		—		—		2	0
Paysandu (loan)	2014	Série C	13	6	—		2	0	—		—		15	6
Goiás (loan)	2015	Série A	7	0	12	3	1	0	1 (Note: Appearance(s) in Copa Sudamericana)	0	—		21	3
Ituano	2016	Série D	—		13	2	—		—		—		13	2
Paysandu (loan)	2016	Série B	3	0	—		3	0	—		—		6	0
Botafogo-PB	2016	Série C	1	0	—		—		—		—		1	0
Vila Nova	2017	Série B	9	0	2	0	—		—		—		11	0
CRB	2018	Série B	—		8	0	1	0	—		3	0	12	0
Remo	2018	Série C	4	0	—		—		—		—		4	0
Caxias	2019	Série D	8	0	8	0	—		—		—		16	0
São Bento	2020	Série C	8	0	17	5	—		—		—		25	5
São Bento	2021	Série D	—		9	0	—		—		—		9	0
São Bento	Total		8	0	26	5	—		—		—		34	5
Atibaia	2021	Paulista A2	—		—		—		—		7 (Note: Appearance(s) in Copa Paulista)	2	7	2
Atibaia	2022	Paulista A2	—		5	0	—		—		—		5	0
Atibaia	Total		—		5	0	—		—		7	2	12	2
Amazonas	2022	Série D	16	3	—		—		—		—		16	3
Amazonas	2023	Série C	13	0	9	0	—		—		—		22	0
Amazonas	Total		29	3	9	0	—		—		—		38	3
Laguna (loan)	2022	Potiguar 2ª Divisão	—		5	1	—		—		—		5	1
ABC	2024	Série C	14	1	11	1	2	0	—		10	0	37	2
Floresta	2025	Série C	16	3	6	3	—		—		—		22	6
São José-SP	2026	Paulista A2	—		5	0	—		—		—		5	0
Career total			128	19	112	15	12	0	1	0	20	2	273	36

== Honours ==
Internacional

- Campeonato Gaúcho: 2014

Goiás

- Campeonato Goiano: 2015

Amazonas

- Campeonato Amazonense: 2023
- Campeonato Brasileiro Série C: 2023
