= Naldinho =

Naldinho is a nickname. It may refer to:

- Naldinho (footballer, born 1990), Brazilian football midfielder Erivonaldo Florencio de Oliveira Filho
- Naldinho (footballer, born 1992), Brazilian football forward Leonardo Benedito da Silva
