= Robston =

Brazilian footballer

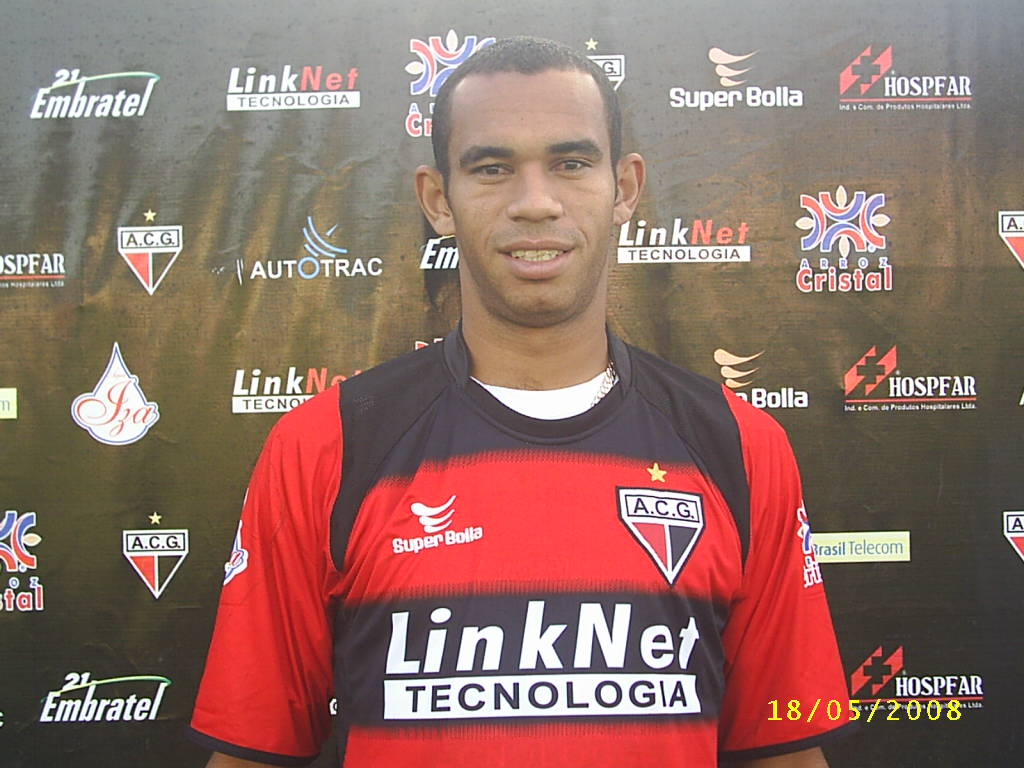

Personal information
- Full name: Carlos Robston Ludgero Júnior
- Date of birth: December 23, 1981 (age 44)
- Place of birth: Gama, Federal District, Brazil
- Height: 1.90 m (6 ft 3 in)
- Position: Defensive midfielder

Team information
- Current team: Botafogo-PB

Senior career*
Years	Team	Apps	(Gls)
2000–2001	Gama		
2002–2006	Brasiliense		
2006	Ituano		
2007–2013	Atlético Goianiense		
2011	→ Atlético Paranaense (loan)	5	(0)
2011	→ Sport (loan)	10	(1)
2012	→ Vitória (loan)	0	(0)
2012	→ Ceará (loan)	13	(0)
2013–2016	Vila Nova	53	(6)
2016	Cuiabá EC	4	(0)
2016–	Botafogo-PB	0	(0)
- * Club domestic league appearances and goals as of March 21, 2013

Carlos Robston Ludgero Junior (born October 20, 1979), commonly known as Robston, is a Brazilian footballer who plays as a defensive midfielder for Botafogo-PB.

== Career ==
Robston began in the youth of the range. He also played for rival Brasiliense. In 2007 passed by Atletico-GO until you get to Botafogo to replace Leandro Guerreiro Carioca Championship in early 2008. But in the same year he returned to the club Goias.

== Honours ==
Robston has won the Goiano Championship under the flag of Atlético Clube Goianiense two times. 2007 and 2010.

Robston has the title of champion of the Brazilian National Tournament of 3rd Division (under the flag of Atlético Clube Goianiense) at the year of 2008.

== Honours ==
Gama

- Campeonato Brasiliense: 2001, 2003

Brasiliense

- Campeonato Brasiliense: 2004, 2005, 2006
- Campeonato Brasileiro Série B: 2004

Atlético Goianiense

- Campeonato Goiano: 2011

Vila Nova

- Campeonato Goiano Série B: 2015
- Campeonato Brasileiro Série C: 2015
