= Sandrinho (footballer, born 1992) =

Brazilian footballer

Personal information
- Full name: Sandro Henrique Alves Soares
- Date of birth: 13 April 1992 (age 34)
- Place of birth: Campo Grande, Brazil
- Height: 1.69 m (5 ft 7 in)
- Positions: Forward; winger

Youth career
- 2008–2012: Grêmio
- 2012: Sport Recife

Senior career*
Years	Team	Apps	(Gls)
2012–2014	Sport Recife	24	(0)
2014	→ Oeste (loan)		
2015–2016	Campinense	0	(0)
2015	→ Icasa (loan)	8	(2)
2017	Rio Branco	2	(1)
2018	Sertãozinho	6	(1)
2018	Tubarão	1	(0)
2019	Sertãozinho	10	(1)
- * Club domestic league appearances and goals

Sandro Henrique Alves Soares (born 13 April 1992), better known as Sandrinho, is a Brazilian former footballer who played as a forward or winger.

== Honours ==
Sport Recife

- Copa do Nordeste: 2014
- Campeonato Pernambucano: 2014
