= Bady (footballer) =

Brazilian footballer (born 1989)

Personal information
- Full name: Renato Escobar Baruffi
- Date of birth: 27 April 1989 (age 37)
- Place of birth: São José do Rio Preto, Brazil
- Height: 1.70 m (5 ft 7 in)
- Position: Attacking midfielder

Team information
- Current team: Votuporanguense
- Number: 10

Youth career
- 2004–2007: Rio Preto
- 2007: → Palmeiras (loan)

Senior career*
Years	Team	Apps	(Gls)
2007–2010	Rio Preto	68	(8)
2008	→ Ituano (loan)	0	(0)
2010–2014	São Bernardo	96	(14)
2012	→ Santo André (loan)	18	(4)
2013	→ América (loan)	22	(5)
2014–2017	Atlético Paranaense	28	(3)
2015	→ Ponte Preta (loan)	11	(1)
2016–2017	→ Figueirense (loan)	18	(2)
2017–2019	Gençlerbirliği	11	(0)
2018	→ Istra 1961 (loan)	12	(1)
2019–2020	Guarani	16	(1)
2020	Botafogo-SP	25	(0)
2022	Nacional-SP	10	(1)
2023	Barretos	9	(1)
2024–	Votuporanguense	35	(5)
- * Club domestic league appearances and goals as of 10:40, 7 December 2023 (UTC)

Renato Escobar Baruffi (born 27 April 1989), commonly known as Bady, is a Brazilian professional footballer who plays as an attacking midfielder.

== Career ==
A Rio Preto youth graduate, Bady made his senior debuts in 2007, aged just 18. He subsequently served loans at Palmeiras and Ituano. On 26 May 2010, Bady signed for São Bernardo. After being sparingly used during 2011 Campeonato Paulista (which ended in relegation), he played an instrumental part in the club's comeback at the first attempt. On 21 May 2012, Bady joined Santo André on loan until December. He returned to São Bernardo in January 2013, appearing regularly in the year's Paulistão, but was loaned to América on 30 May.

Despite appearing regularly for Coelho, Bady was not bought outright, and scored seven goals in 2014 Campeonato Paulista for São Bernardo. On 17 April 2014, he moved to Atlético Paranaense. Bady made his Série A debut on 18 May, starting in a 1–1 home draw against Chapecoense. He scored his first goal on the 28th, netting the first of a 2–2 draw against São Paulo. In 2015, Bady joined Ponte Preta on loan. He made 13 appearances, including appearing twice in the 2015 Copa Sudamericana, before returning to his parent club.

In February 2016, Bady completed a loan move to Figueirense. His debut came in the 2016 Campeonato Catarinense against Metropolitano on 3 March, his first goal for the club came three games later against Internacional in the same competition.

In January 2017, Bady transferred to the Turkish side Gençlerbirliği.

== Honours ==
São Bernardo

- Campeonato Paulista Série A2: 2012
- Copa Paulista: 2013

Votuporanguense

- Campeonato Paulista Série A3: 2024
