= Paulista (footballer, born 1988) =

Brazilian footballer

Personal information
- Full name: Fábio Francisco Barros da Trindade
- Date of birth: 28 April 1988 (age 38)
- Place of birth: Paulista, Brazil
- Height: 1.75 m (5 ft 9 in)
- Position: Striker

Team information
- Current team: Santa Cruz
- Number: 20

Youth career
- 2005–2009: Porto

Senior career*
Years	Team	Apps	(Gls)
2010–2011	Porto	22	(15)
2011	Sport	14	(1)
2012	Criciúma	2	(0)
2012	ABC	2	(0)
2012–	Santa Cruz	5	(0)
- * Club domestic league appearances and goals

Fábio Francisco Barros da Trindade (born 28 April 1988 in Paulista), or simply Paulista, is a Brazilian footballer who plays as a striker. He currently plays for Sete de Setembro Esporte Clube.

== Honours ==
=== Individual ===
- Pernambuco State League Top Scorer: 2011
