= Wellington Saci =

Brazilian footballer

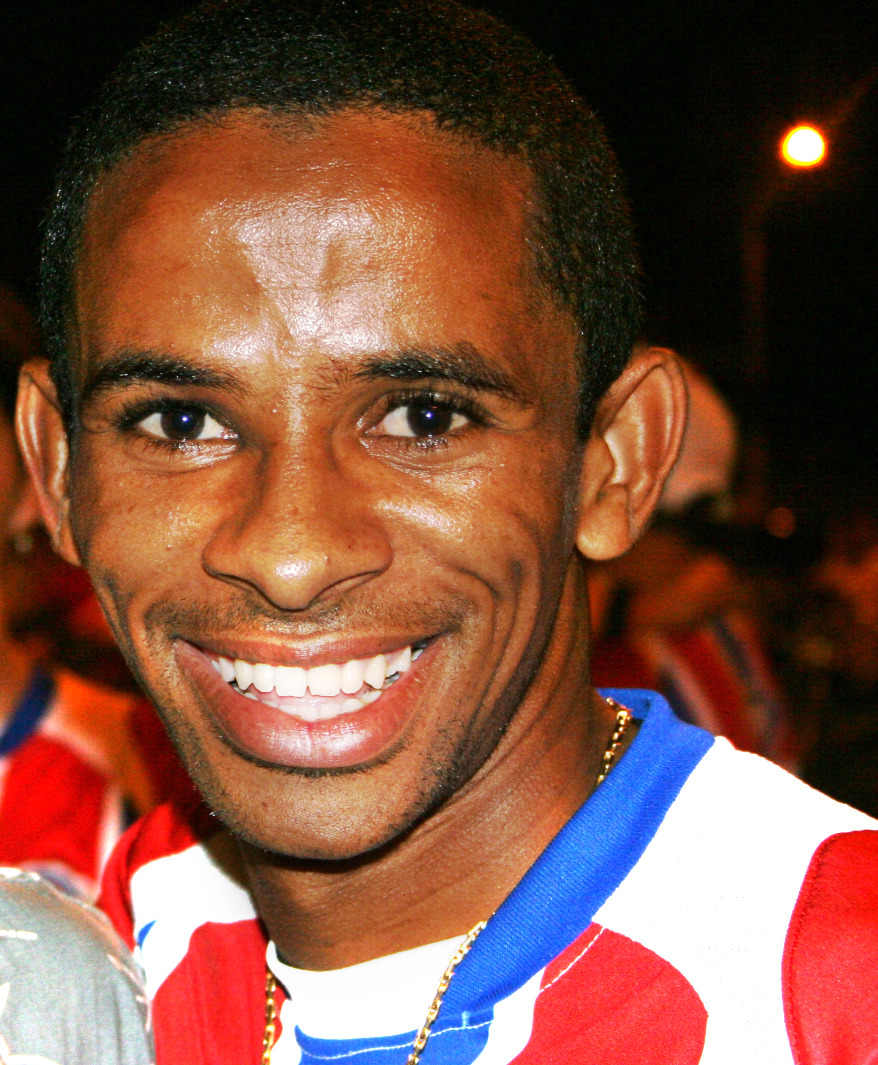

Personal information
- Full name: Wellington Aleixo dos Santos
- Date of birth: 5 January 1985 (age 41)
- Place of birth: Belém, Brazil
- Height: 1.73 m (5 ft 8 in)
- Position: Left-back

Team information
- Current team: Água Santa

Senior career*
Years	Team	Apps	(Gls)
2005	Ananindeua	0	(0)
2006	Extrema	0	(0)
2007	Vênus	0	(0)
2007	Remo	24	(2)
2008	Itumbiara	0	(0)
2008–2012	Corinthians	24	(1)
2009	→ Atlético Mineiro (loan)	5	(0)
2010	→ Goiás (loan)	23	(3)
2011	→ Sport Recife (loan)	34	(2)
2012	→ Vitória (loan)	4	(0)
2012	→ Atlético Paranaense (loan)	10	(1)
2013	Figueirense	31	(3)
2014–2015	Joinville	7	(0)
2015	CRB	14	(0)
2016	Criciúma	2	(0)
2016	Remo	12	(1)
2017	Madureira	0	(0)
2017	Hercílio Luz	0	(0)
2018	Água Santa	0	(0)
2018	Brasiliense	10	(0)
2019	Almirante Tamandaré	0	(0)
2020–	Joinville	0	(0)
- * Club domestic league appearances and goals as of 19:28, 19 April 2020 (UTC)

Wellington Aleixo dos Santos (born 5 January 1985), known as Wellington Saci, is a Brazilian footballer who plays as a left back for Joinville.

He is named after the folk creature Saci, a one-legged black leprechaun of sorts.

== Biography ==
Born in Belém, Pará, Wellington Saci started his career at Ananindeua, signed a 1-year contract. He then played for Extrema and Vênus before signed by Remo in May 2007.

In January 2008 he was signed by Itumbiara.

=== Corinthians and loans ===
In May he left for Corinthians, with Itumbiara retained 50% economic rights. An investor "Fair Play Sports" also owned 15%, made Corinthians only 35%. He costed Corinthians R$ 624,000. He won the second division and promoted back to top division. In July 2009 he moved to Atlético Mineiro in 1-year contract. In February 2010 he left for Goiás, finished as the 2010 Copa Sudamericana runner-up.

In January 2011 he left for Sport Recife. In January 2012 he left for Esporte Clube Vitória

== Honours ==
Itumbiara

- Goiás state championship: 2008

Corinthians

- Brazilian Série B: 2008
- São Paulo state championship: 2009
- Brazilian Cup: 2009

Joinville

- Brazilian Série B: 2014

individual

- 2008: Chosen as the best player in the state of Goiás Championship

== Career statistics ==
Club performance			League		Cup		League Cup		Continental		Total	
Season	Club	League	Apps	Goals	Apps	Goals	Apps	Goals	Apps	Goals	Apps	Goals
Brazil			League		Copa do Brasil		League Cup		South America		Total	
2005	Ananindeua	state (PA)					?	?			?	?
2006	Extrema	state (MG)					?	?			?	?
2007	Vênus	state (PA)					?	?			?	?
2007	Remo	Série B	24	2							24	2
2008	Itumbiara	Série C	0	0			?	?			?	?
2008	Corinthians	Série B	18	1							18	1
2009	Corinthians	Série A	6	0	2	0	8	0			16	0
2009	Atlético Mineiro	Série A	5	0					2	0	7	0
2010	Goiás	Série B	23	0	5	0	?	?	8	0	?	?
2011	Sport (PE)	Série B			2	1	23	3				
Career total					9	1	?	?	10	0	?	?
