= Jackson (footballer, born 11 May 1990) =

Brazilian footballer

Jackson Alan Tibolla Rodrigues (Porto Alegre, May 11, 1990) is a Brazilian soccer defender who plays for Coritiba. He has previously played for Juventude (2009), Ponte Preta (2010) and Boa Esporte (2011).

He played in the Campeonato Brasileiro Série B for Juventude and Boa Esporte.
