= Danielzinho (footballer, born 1988) =

Brazilian footballer

Personal information
- Full name: Daniel Tiago Duarte
- Date of birth: 21 February 1988 (age 38)
- Place of birth: São Paulo, Brazil
- Height: 1.75 m (5 ft 9 in)
- Position: Winger

Team information
- Current team: Atlético Cearense

Youth career
- 2007–2008: São Bernardo

Senior career*
Years	Team	Apps	(Gls)
2008–2012	São Bernardo	49	(17)
2010	→ Avaí (loan)	9	(0)
2011	→ Sport Recife (loan)	13	(1)
2012	→ São Caetano (loan)	31	(9)
2013–2014	São Caetano	38	(9)
2014–2015	AEL Limassol	10	(4)
2016	Oeste	6	(0)
2016	Botafogo	12	(5)
2017	Água Santa	6	(0)
2017	Bangu	2	(0)
2018	Itabaiana	7	(2)
2018	Itumbiara	6	(2)
2019–	Atlético Cearense	0	(0)
- * Club domestic league appearances and goals as of 7 February 2019

Daniel Tiago Duarte (born 21 February 1988), simply known as Danielzinho is a Brazilian professional footballer playing for Atlético Cearense as a forward.

On 30 June 2013, Duarte signed for Cypriot club AEL Limassol.
