= Rafael Oliveira =

Brazilian footballer

Personal information
- Full name: Rafael de Souza Oliveira
- Date of birth: 16 June 1988 (age 38)
- Place of birth: Nanuque, Brazil
- Position: Midfielder

Senior career*
Years	Team	Apps	(Gls)
2008–20??	Democrata-SL		
2009–2010	The Cong F.C.	?	(3)
2010–2011	Navibank Sài Gòn F.C.		
2011–2013	Than Quang Ninh F.C.		
2013–2014	América		
2014	Phnom Penh Crown FC		
- * Club domestic league appearances and goals

Rafael de Souza Oliveira (born 16 June 1988) is a Brazilian former professional footballer who last played for Phnom Penh Crown of the Cambodian League in 2014.

== Thể Công ==
In 2009, Rafael Oliveira played for Thể Công in the V-League, Vietnamese top-flight football league. He finished the 2009 season scoring 3 goals.

== Phnom Penh Crown ==
Revealed as one of 2011 Cambodian League titleholders Phnom Penh Crown foreign signings for the 2014 season, Oliveira made his debut for the club in the opening game of 2014, which ended in a 4-0 victory over AEU. However, mainly due to limited playing time due to injuries, and the foreign player quota, the Brazilian midfielder's contract was not renewed.
