= Oswaldo (footballer) =

Brazilian footballer

Personal information
- Full name: Oswaldo Alfredo de Lima Gonçalves
- Date of birth: 27 December 1992 (age 33)
- Place of birth: Olinda, Brazil
- Height: 1.88 m (6 ft 2 in)
- Position: Defender

Youth career
- 2011: Sport

Senior career*
Years	Team	Apps	(Gls)
2012–2017	Sport	24	(1)
2016	→ XV de Piracicaba (loan)	0	(0)
2017	→ ABC (loan)	9	(0)
- * Club domestic league appearances and goals as of 30 March 2018

Oswaldo Alfredo de Lima Gonçalves (born 27 December 1992), is a Brazilian footballer who plays as a defender.

== Career statistics ==
As of 1 January 2017

Club	Season	League			State League		Cup		Continental		Other		Total	
Club	Season	Division	Apps	Goals	Apps	Goals	Apps	Goals	Apps	Goals	Apps	Goals	Apps	Goals
Sport	2013	Série B	11	1	0	0	0	0	2	0	—		13	1
Sport	2014	Série A	7	0	2	0	2	0	1	0	7	0	19	0
Sport	2015	Série A	3	0	9	1	4	0	—		0	0	16	1
Sport	2016	Série A	3	0	—		—		—		—		3	0
Sport	Subtotal		24	1	11	1	6	0	3	0	7	0	51	2
XV de Piracicaba	2016	Paulista	—		6	1	—		—		—		6	1
Total			24	1	17	2	6	0	3	0	7	0	57	3

== Honours ==
=== Club ===
Sport

- Copa do Nordeste: 2014
- Campeonato Pernambucano: 2014
