= Júnior Viçosa =

Brazilian footballer

Personal information
- Full name: Luiz Severo Júnior
- Date of birth: 24 July 1989 (age 37)
- Place of birth: Viçosa, Brazil
- Height: 1.83 m (6 ft 0 in)
- Position: Striker

Team information
- Current team: Brasil de Pelotas

Youth career
- 2006–2007: Angrense
- 2008: Igaci
- 2009: ASA

Senior career*
Years	Team	Apps	(Gls)
2009–2010	ASA	33	(10)
2010	→ Grêmio (loan)	5	(1)
2011–2014	Grêmio	5	(2)
2011	→ Sport (loan)	19	(4)
2012–2013	→ Goiás (loan)	24	(4)
2014	→ Atlético Goianiense (loan)	22	(10)
2014–2015	Chiasso	13	(2)
2015–2017	Atlético Goianiense	54	(16)
2017–2018	Goiás	29	(2)
2019	América Mineiro	45	(11)
2020	Vitória	21	(0)
2021–	Brasil de Pelotas	1	(0)
- * Club domestic league appearances and goals as of 11:18, 8 May 2019 (UTC)

Luiz Severo Júnior (born 24 July 1989), known as Júnior Viçosa, is a Brazilian professional footballer who plays as a striker for Brasil de Pelotas.

== Career ==
Júnior Viçosa began his career at ASA of Alagoas. Before turning professional, he spent months on the basis of Angrense divisions of Portugal for testing. After a distinguished team of Alagoas for the main team, 1st division clubs of Brazil became interested in his football. But the Grêmio ran ahead. On September 23, 2010, Jackson landed in Porto Alegre with the manager to sign a loan contract until the end of the year with the Grêmio, which has the option to termination.

In his debut with Grêmio's shirt, he scored the equalizing goal when the game was 1-0 to Cruzeiro. The match played at the Olympic Stadium ended 2-1 in Porto Alegre in Rio Grande do Sul facing the team, and the tie-breaking goal scored by Jonas.

== Career statistics ==
As of 1 May 2019

Career in Brazil
Club	Season	Division	League		State League		Copa do Brasil		CONMEBOL		Other		Total	
Club	Season	Division	Apps	Goals	Apps	Goals	Apps	Goals	Apps	Goals	Apps	Goals	Apps	Goals
ASA	2009	Série C	11	0	—		—		—		—		11	0
ASA	2010	Série B	22	10	—		4	3	—		—		26	13
Grêmio (loan)	2010	Série A	5	1	—		—		—		—		5	1
Grêmio	2011	Série A	5	2	11	7	—		5	0	—		21	9
Sport Recife (loan)	2011	Série B	19	4	—		—		—		—		19	4
Goiás (loan)	2012	Série B	15	4	6	0	3	0	—		—		24	4
Goiás (loan)	2013	Série A	9	0	14	7	5	1	—		—		28	8
Atlético Goianiense (loan)	2014	Série B	22	10	17	9	4	3	—		—		43	22
Atlético Goianiense	2015	Série B	17	6	—		—		—		—		17	6
Atlético Goianiense	2016	Série B	30	10	9	1	2	1	—		—		41	12
Atlético Goianiense	2017	Série A	7	0	15	6	2	0	—		—		24	6
Goiás	2017	Série B	16	2	—		—		—		—		16	2
Goiás	2018	Série B	13	0	12	6	4	1	—		—		29	7
América Mineiro	2019	Série B	2	0	13	4	2	0	—		—		17	4
Total in Brazil			193	49	97	40	26	9	5	0	—		321	98
Career in Switzerland
Club	Season	Division	League		League Cup		Swiss Cup		UEFA		Other		Total	
Club	Season	Division	Apps	Goals	Apps	Goals	Apps	Goals	Apps	Goals	Apps	Goals	Apps	Goals
Chiasso	2014–15	Challenge League	13	2	—		—		—		—		13	2
Total in Switzerland			13	2	—		—		—		—		13	2
Career Total			206	51	97	40	26	9	5	0	—		332	100

== Honours ==
=== Club ===
ASA

- Campeonato Alagoano: 2009

Goiás

- Campeonato Goiano: 2012, 2013
- Campeonato Brasileiro Série B: 2012

Atlético Goianiense

- Campeonato Goiano: 2014
- Campeonato Brasileiro Série B: 2016

=== Individual ===
- Campeonato Goiano Top goalscorer: 2014
