= Thiaguinho (footballer, born 1984) =

Brazilian footballer

Personal information
- Full name: Thiago Rocha da Cunha
- Date of birth: November 22, 1984 (age 41)
- Place of birth: Rio de Janeiro, Brazil
- Height: 1.69 m (5 ft 6 1/2 in)
- Positions: Defensive midfielder; right back

Team information
- Current team: ABC

Senior career*
Years	Team	Apps	(Gls)
2008–2011	Boavista	0	(0)
2009	→ Botafogo (loan)	22	(0)
2010	→ Fluminense (loan)	7	(0)
2011–	Sport Recife	31	(0)
2012	→ América-RN (loan)	8	(1)
2013–	→ ABC (loan)		
- * Club domestic league appearances and goals as of 11 March 2013 (UTC)

Thiago Rocha da Cunha, Thiaguinho (Rio de Janeiro, November 22, 1984) is a Brazilian footballer who currently plays for Sport Recife since 12 January 2011. He had last played for Fluminense.
