= Neco (footballer, born 1964) =

Brazilian footballer and manager

Personal information
- Full name: Manoel Carlos de Lima Filho
- Date of birth: 8 February 1964 (age 62)
- Place of birth: Umbuzeiro, Brazil
- Height: 1.78 m (5 ft 10 in)
- Position: Winger

Team information
- Current team: Petrolina (Manager)

Senior career*
Years	Team	Apps	(Gls)
1987–1993	Sport Recife		

Managerial career
- 2005: Sport
- 2008–2010: Salgueiro
- 2010: Ypiranga
- 2010: Petrolina
- 2011–2012: Salgueiro
- 2013–2014: Sport (assistant)
- 2013: Sport (interim)
- 2015: Petrolina
- 2016: Timbaúba
- * Club domestic league appearances and goals

Manoel Carlos de Lima Filho or simply Neco (born 8 January 1964) is a Brazilian former footballer, who played as a winger, and a manager.

He played for Sport Recife in the '80s as one of the heroes of the red-black Pernambuco in winning the Union Cup 1987. After this he was a manager.

He commanded the Salgueiro, in the years 2008 and 2009. He was still in Ypiranga and Petrolina, returning as coach of Willow in 2013. Neco took over after the fall of Marcelo Martelotte due to poor results in Serie B.

== Honors ==
=== Player ===
Sport Recife

- Campeonato Brasileiro: 1987
- Campeonato Pernambucano: 1988, 1991, 1992
