= Bruno Mineiro =

Brazilian footballer (born 1983)

Personal information
- Full name: Bruno Menezes Soares
- Date of birth: 2 February 1983 (age 43)
- Place of birth: Belo Horizonte, Brazil
- Height: 1.76 m (5 ft 9 1/2 in)
- Position: Striker

Youth career
- 2002–2004: Londrina

Senior career*
Years	Team	Apps	(Gls)
2005–2007	Londrina		
2006	→ Noroeste (loan)		
2008	Rio Branco-MG		
2008	Enköping	?	(2)
2009	América Mineiro	6	(3)
2009	Náutico	10	(8)
2010–2014	Atlético Paranaense	37	(7)
2011	→ Sport (loan)	30	(13)
2012	→ Portuguesa (loan)	23	(14)
2013–2014	→ Al Khor (loan)	12	(5)
2014	→ Goiás (loan)	17	(2)
2015	Santa Cruz	7	(0)
2016	Portuguesa	14	(2)
2018–2020	Coimbra		
- * Club domestic league appearances and goals

Bruno Menezes Soares (born 2 February 1983), known as Bruno Mineiro, is a Brazilian former footballer who played as a striker.
