= Jheimy =

Brazilian footballer

Personal information
- Full name: Jheimy da Silva Carvalho
- Date of birth: August 6, 1988 (age 38)
- Place of birth: Jacundá, Brazil
- Height: 1.80 m (5 ft 11 in)
- Position: Striker

Team information
- Current team: São Bento

Senior career*
| Years | Team | Apps | (Gls) |
| 2007 | União Itaberaí | | |
| 2008 | River | | |
| 2009 | Imperatriz | | |
| 2009 | São José-MA | | |
| 2009 | → Moto Club (loan) | | |
| 2010 | Atlético Mineiro | 9 | (0) |
| 2011 | → Boa Esporte (loan) | 22 | (12) |
| 2012 | → Sport (loan) | 28 | (6) |
| 2012–2014 | Oeste | 28 | (7) |
| 2013 | → ABC (loan) | 4 | (0) |
| 2014 | Vila Nova | 16 | (8) |
| 2015 | Ituano | 6 | (1) |
| 2015–2016 | Sampaio Corrêa | 25 | (8) |
| 2016–2017 | Criciúma | 45 | (11) |
| 2017 | Oeste | 15 | (0) |
| 2018 | Botafogo-SP | 21 | (6) |
| 2018 | Sampaio Corrêa | 10 | (2) |
| 2019 | Oeste | 9 | (2) |
| 2019 | Paysandu | 9 | (0) |
| 2020– | São Bento | 8 | (3) |
- * Club domestic league appearances and goals as of March 11, 2013

Jheimy da Silva Carvalho (born August 6, 1988, in Jacundá), is a Brazilian footballer who acts as a striker. Currently plays for São Bento.

== Career ==
Jheimy Carvalho da Silva is a football striker revealed in the basic categories of Itaberaí Union, the State of Goiás club after stints in clubs in North and Northeast of the country, came to Atletico for a period of testing mid-2010. After approval of coach Vanderlei Luxemburgo was hired on July 29.

=== Career statistics ===
(Correct as of October 16, 2010)

| Club | Season | State League | | Brazilian Série A | | Copa do Brasil | | Copa Sudamericana | | Total | |
| Club | Season | Apps | Goals | Apps | Goals | Apps | Goals | Apps | Goals | Apps | Goals |
|---|---|---|---|---|---|---|---|---|---|---|---|
| Atlético Mineiro | 2010 | - | - | - | - | - | - | 2 | 0 | 2 | 0 |
| Total | | - | - | - | - | - | - | 2 | 0 | 2 | 0 |

== Contract ==
- Atlético Mineiro.
