= Maylson =

Brazilian footballer (born 1989)

Personal information
- Full name: Maylson Barbosa Teixeira
- Date of birth: 6 March 1989 (age 37)
- Place of birth: São Bernardo do Campo, Brazil
- Height: 1.80 m (5 ft 11 in)
- Position: Midfielder

Team information
- Current team: Novo Hamburgo

Youth career
- 2005–2007: Grêmio

Senior career*
Years	Team	Apps	(Gls)
2007–2013	Grêmio	68	(12)
2011	→ Sport (loan)	23	(3)
2012	→ Portuguesa (loan)	17	(1)
2013	→ Figueirense (loan)	51	(16)
2014	Criciúma	12	(1)
2015	Chapecoense	7	(0)
2015–2016	Coimbra	0	(0)
2016	→ Red Bull Brasil (loan)	14	(2)
2016–2017	Náutico	17	(2)
2017–2018	Red Bull Brasil	4	(0)
2018	Londrina	0	(0)
2019	Náutico	14	(2)
2020–	Novo Hamburgo	0	(0)

International career
2008	Brazil U19		
2009	Brazil U20	12	(2)
- * Club domestic league appearances and goals as of 10 March 2019

Maylson Barbosa Teixeira (born 6 March 1989), simply known as Maylson, is a Brazilian footballer who plays as a midfielder for Novo Hamburgo.

== Club career ==
=== Grêmio ===
Born in São Bernardo do Campo, Maylson started his career on Grêmio in 2005, playing for the youth team. A versatile midfielder, he's one of rising stars from the club. On November 11, 2007, he made his first team debut, in a 1–0 away loss against São Paulo, playing the full match. He also played the following game, a 0–3 away win over América de Natal. Maylson assisted the first goal, scored by Willian Magrão, with a brilliant pass.

In January 2008, he feature in the Copa São Paulo de Futebol Júnior and after his good performances, Grêmio rejected a £3 million bid from the German company Rogon Sportmanagement.

=== Sport Recife ===
Maylson joined Brazilian Série B side Sport on loan until the end of the season on 19 May 2011.

== International career ==
=== Brazil Youth ===
He was part of the Brazil Under-19 national team and was selected to play for the Brazil Under-20 national team in the 2009 South American Youth Championship. On August 31, Maylson was called again for national side, this time for the 2009 FIFA U-20 World Cup.

== Honours ==
International

- South American Youth Championship: 2009
