= Naldinho (footballer, born 1990) =

Brazilian footballer

Personal information
- Full name: Erivonaldo Florencio de Oliveira Filho
- Date of birth: 12 May 1990 (age 36)
- Place of birth: Caruaru, Brazil
- Height: 1.81 m (5 ft 11 1/2 in)
- Position: Midfielder

Team information
- Current team: Tabajara FC

Senior career*
Years	Team	Apps	(Gls)
2008–2011	Porto–PE		
2009	→ Pesqueira (loan)		
2010	→ Central (loan)		
2011	→ Sport (loan)		
2012–	Sport		
2013	→ São Bernardo (loan)		
2016–	→ ABC (loan)		
- * Club domestic league appearances and goals as of 10 February 2017

Erivonaldo Florencio de Oliveira Filho (born May 12, 1990 in Caruaru), known as Naldinho, is a Brazilian footballer who plays for Tabajara FC as a midfielder.

== Career statistics ==
As of 10 February 2017

Club	Season	League			State League		Cup		Conmebol		Other		Total	
Club	Season	Division	Apps	Goals	Apps	Goals	Apps	Goals	Apps	Goals	Apps	Goals	Apps	Goals
Central	2010	Série D	3	0	—		—		—		—		3	0
Porto–PE	2011	Série D	—		9	2	—		—		—		3	0
Sport	2011	Série B	17	2	—		—		—		—		17	2
Sport	2012	Série A	5	0	5	0	2	0	—		—		12	0
Sport	2013	Série B	1	0	—		—		—		—		1	0
Sport	2014	Série A	—		—		—		—		3 (Note: All appearance(s) in Copa do Nordeste)	0	3	0
Sport	Subtotal		23	2	5	0	2	0	—		3	0	33	2
São Bernardo	2013	Paulista	—		8	1	—		—		—		8	1
ABC	2016	Série C	1	0	7	0	2	0	—		3	1	13	1
Career total			93	6	95	2	9	0	0	0	6	0	203	8
