= Saulo (footballer, born 1989) =

Brazilian footballer

Personal information
- Full name: Saulo Araújo Fontes
- Date of birth: April 2, 1989 (age 37)
- Place of birth: Piranhas, Brazil
- Height: 1.95 m (6 ft 5 in)
- Position: Goalkeeper

Team information
- Current team: Moto Club

Youth career
- 2005–2006: Sport

Senior career*
| Years | Team | Apps | (Gls) |
| 2007–2017 | Sport | 42 | (1) |
| 2007–2008 | → SEV Hortolândia (loan) | 0 | (0) |
| 2015 | → ABC (loan) | 48 | (0) |
| 2016 | → Treze (loan) | 1 | (0) |
| 2016 | → Vila Nova (loan) | 13 | (0) |
| 2017 | Sertãozinho | 5 | (0) |
| 2017 | Moto Club | 7 | (0) |
| 2018 | Treze | 0 | (0) |
| 2019 | ABC | 6 | (0) |
| 2020– | Moto Club | 0 | (0) |
- * Club domestic league appearances and goals as of 22:31, 19 April 2020 (UTC)

Saulo Araújo Fontes or simply Saulo (born April 2, 1989 in Piranhas), is a Brazilian goalkeeper. He currently plays for Moto Club.

Saulo scored a last minute winner against Vitória-PE in February 2011, during a Campeonato Pernambucano match, his first ever professional goal. He injured himself while celebrating and was sidelined for six months with tore knee ligaments.

== Honours ==
Sport

- Campeonato Pernambucano: 2010
- Copa do Nordeste: 2014

ABC

- Copa RN: 2015
