= Willians Santana =

Brazilian footballer

Personal information
- Full name: Willians Santana dos Santos
- Date of birth: 22 May 1988 (age 38)
- Place of birth: Aracaju, Brazil
- Height: 1.80 m (5 ft 11 in)
- Positions: Attacking midfielder; forward

Team information
- Current team: Confiança

Youth career
- 2001–2005: Vitória

Senior career*
Years	Team	Apps	(Gls)
2006–2010	Vitória	33	(3)
2009–2010	→ Palmeiras (loan)	35	(3)
2010–2015	Desportivo Brasil	0	(0)
2010–2011	→ Fluminense (loan)	19	(1)
2011–2013	→ Sport (loan)	58	(10)
2013–2014	→ América Mineiro (loan)	83	(14)
2015	→ Bahia (loan)	30	(3)
2015–2016	Matsumoto Yamaga	16	(1)
2017	Atlético Goianiense	14	(0)
2017	Avaí	20	(0)
2018	CRB	56	(13)
2019	Al-Khor	6	(0)
2019	CRB	12	(1)
2020	Cuiabá	29	(1)
2021–	Confiança	12	(3)
- * Club domestic league appearances and goals as of 00:55, 27 July 2019 (UTC)

Willians dos Santos Santana (born 22 May 1988), simply known as Willians Santana, is a Brazilian footballer who plays as an attacking midfielder for Confiança. He also plays as a forward.

== Honours ==
Vitória

- Campeonato Baiano: 2007, 2008

Fluminense

- Campeonato Brasileiro Série A: 2010

Bahia

- Campeonato Baiano: 2015
